= Timeline of BBC Radio 1 =

A timeline of notable events relating to BBC Radio 1, a British national radio station which began broadcasting in September 1967.

== 1960s ==
- 1967
  - 30 September – BBC Radio 1 launches at 7am, replacing the BBC Light Programme, with Tony Blackburn presenting the first show. He welcomes listeners to "the exciting sound of Radio 1" and then plays the station's first track: The Move's "Flowers in the Rain". Other presenters of the launch team include John Peel, Stuart Henry, Terry Wogan, Jimmy Young, Dave Cash, Simon Dee, David Symonds, Tommy Vance, Emperor Rosko, Kenny Everett and Ed Stewart.
  - Saturday Club, Junior Choice, Easy Beat, Pick of the Pops and Radio 1 Breakfast are broadcast on Radio 1 for the first time.
  - 1 October – The first Peel Session takes place. Aired as part of his new show Top Gear, the session features psychedelic rock band Tomorrow.
  - 2 November – Dave Lee Travis joins, presenting the Thursday lunchtime show Pop North.
- 1968
  - 27 January – Tony Blackburn presents the breakfast show on Saturdays for the final time. Rather than replace him, Radio 1 simulcasts the entirety of Breakfast Special.
  - 2 June – Jimmy Savile joins, presenting the Savile's Travels show.
  - 21 October – The Radio 1 Club is launched at lunchtimes. The new programme is a link between the listeners at home, the singers, and the station's disc-jockeys. As a result, Radio One O'Clock, The Disc Jockey Derby, Parade of the Pops, Pop North, and The Joe Loss Show are broadcast for the final time. In addition, the Midday Spin name is retired from Mondays to Fridays, while continuing to be the title of Emperor Rosko's Saturday lunchtime show.
- 1969
  - 18 January – Saturday Club is broadcast for the last time. The show is replaced by Everett is Here, hosted by Kenny Everett.
  - 26 April – Johnnie Walker joins the station for the first time.
  - Noel Edmonds joins, Simon Dee leaves.

== 1970s ==
- 1970
  - 5 April – The In Concert brand comes into use for the station's live and recorded concerts. The station has already aired concerts since the start of the year, as part of The Sunday Show, with both of these shows being hosted by John Peel.
  - 20 July – Kenny Everett is dismissed after making remarks about the wife of the Transport Minister's driving test and for publicly criticising the BBC. His Saturday morning show is taken over by Noel Edmonds.
  - 19 August – Bob Harris joins to present the Wednesday edition of Sounds of the 70s until 9 September.
  - 9 October – Round Table, a weekly discussion of the week's new releases, begins. The show's first presenter is Emperor Rosko.
  - 19 October – David Symonds leaves the station. He is replaced as the Monday presenter of Sounds of the 70s by Bob Harris, who joined the station two months earlier.
- 1971
  - Radio 1 launches its first promotion badges using the slogan Go Radio 1 Better on 247.
  - 9 September – Dave Cash leaves.
- 1972
  - 9 January – Radio 1 airs its first documentary: The Elvis Presley Story, narrated by Wink Martindale.
  - 31 March – Terry Wogan leaves the station to join Radio 2, and is replaced as the weekday afternoon presenter by Alan Freeman.
  - 24 September – The final edition of Pick of the Pops as the current chart show is broadcast. It would be revived in 1989, this time as a retro chart show.
  - 1 October – A new show, called Solid Gold Sixty, replaces Pick of the Pops as the current chart show. It is hosted by Tom Browne, who joins the station.
- 1973
  - 8 April – Kenny Everett briefly returns to the station, before leaving again in September to move to Capital Radio.
  - 1 June – Tony Blackburn presents his final daily breakfast show on Radio 1, having fronted it since the station went on air in 1967.
  - 4 June – Noel Edmonds takes over as presenter of Radio 1's breakfast show, with Tony Blackburn moving to the mid-morning slot. He replaces Jimmy Young, who leaves the station to join Radio 2. One of the new features is The Golden Hour, an hour of records that charted in the same year.
  - 27 June – Tommy Vance leaves the station for a while to join Capital Radio.
  - 23 July – The first Radio 1 Roadshow takes place, broadcast from Newquay, Cornwall. It is hosted by Alan Freeman.
  - 10 September – Newsbeat bulletins air for the first time and Richard Skinner joins the station, as one of the new show's presenters.
  - 5 October – Paul Gambaccini joins, as a reporter on the new show Rockspeak. It airs as the Friday edition of Sounds of the 70s, and is presented by Michael Wale.
- 1974
  - 17 March – Solid Gold Sixty is broadcast for the final time. It is replaced the following week by a one-hour show which just features the Top 20 singles chart.
  - 24 March – Paul Burnett joins as the presenter of a new Sunday morning show, called All There is to Hear. In addition, a weekly request show is introduced, with Dave Lee Travis being the first presenter.
  - Radio 1 hosts its first Fun Day.
- 1975
  - 1 January – Stuart Henry leaves the station, with his Wednesday show being taken over by Annie Nightingale, and his Saturday morning show by Emperor Rosko, whose show, formerly heard at lunchtime, is extended to three hours.
  - 6 January – Broadcasting hours are reduced due to budget cuts at the BBC. All evening programming stops on Radio 1 and the station simulcasts Radio 2 every evening from 7pm. Consequently, Sounds of the 70s ends and Bob Harris leaves the station for a while. Also, the weekday afternoon show, presented by David Hamilton, is broadcast on both stations and John Peel's show is moved to the drivetime slot.
  - 11 January – Alan Freeman broadcasts a live performance by Pink Floyd which featured a performance of The Dark Side of the Moon in its entirety. It was recorded at the Empire Pool on 16 November 1974.
  - 25 September – The final edition of Top Gear is broadcast.
  - 27 September – Paul Gambaccini presents his first American chart countdown show.
  - 28 September – Annie Nightingale replaces Dave Lee Travis as the host of the Sunday request show, which is renamed The W1A 4WW Show.
  - 29 September – John Peel's show moves back to late evenings. For this, Radio 1 uses Radio 2's VHF/FM frequencies on weeknights again (having previously done so from October 1971 to December 1974, for shows hosted by Peel, Annie Nightingale and Bob Harris among others). This one-hour show on weeknights is the only time of the evening that Radio 1 broadcasts its own shows and the station now ends weekday transmissions an hour earlier at 6pm.
  - Mike Smith joins.
- 1976
  - JAM Creative Productions of Dallas, Texas begins a 20-year relationship with Radio 1 when it produces its first jingle package for the station. JAM also created Radio 2's jingles. Previously, Radio 1's jingles had been produced by PAMS (PAMS was also based in Dallas and the company was purchased by JAM Productions).
  - 2 May – Radio 1 launches Playground, a "magazine show of special interest to young listeners". The new show incorporates Young Ideas in Action which had previously been broadcast as part of Junior Choice.
  - 2 July – Johnnie Walker leaves the station for a while to work in America. His weekday lunchtime show is taken over by Paul Burnett.
  - 11 July – Simon Bates replaces Paul Burnett as the presenter for All There is to Hear. This is Bates' first regular show on Radio 1, but he was heard on the station as far back as 1972, first as a Radio 2 presenter of shows simulcast on Radio 1, then starting in November 1975, as a stand-in presenter.
  - 18 September – Emperor Rosko leaves the station to return to America. His Saturday morning show is shortned back to two hours, with David Jensen joining the station, while the Friday Round Table show that Rosko presented leaves the airwaves for a while, as Dave Lee Travis' show It's D.L.T. OK! gains a Friday edition.
  - 25 September – Stuart Colman joins the station to host a rock show called It's Rock 'n' Roll.
  - December – The first Festive Fifty is revealed by John Peel.
- 1977
  - 4 April – Radio 1 extends its weeknight broadcasting hours. The station's daytime weekday show are extended by an hour, to 7pm, and the John Peel show is also extended by an hour to two hours. Consequently, Radio 1 now borrows Radio 2's VHF/FM frequencies for two hours each weeknight, between 10pm and midnight.
  - 20 November – Peter Powell joins the station to take over All There is to Hear from Simon Bates. This is not his first appearance on the station, however, as he presented eight shows from 1971 to 1972.
  - 28 November – From that day, the station has its own all-day weekday schedule with the launch of a new afternoon show presented by Tony Blackburn. David Hamilton's show, simulcast on both Radio 1 and Radio 2 until then, moves to Radio 2 only. Blackburn is replaced on mid-mornings by Simon Bates. Consequently, Radio 1 now has its own all-day schedule on weekdays. However, the station continues to simulcast Radio 2 each night from 7pm, apart from John Peel's weekday late night show at 10pm.
- 1978
  - Mike Read joins and Mike Smith leaves the station for a while to join Capital Radio.
  - 17 April – David Jensen replaces Dave Lee Travis as host of the weekday drivetime show, with his Saturday mid-morning slot being taken over by Adrian Juste, who joins the station.
  - 28 April – Noel Edmonds presents the Radio 1 breakfast show for the final time.
  - 2 May – Dave Lee Travis takes over as presenter of the Radio 1 breakfast show.
  - 26 August – Alan Freeman leaves the station for a while to join Capital Radio.
  - 12 November – The Sunday teatime chart show is extended from a Top 20 countdown to a Top 40 countdown. Simon Bates is the presenter, having taken over as host from Tom Browne earlier in the year.
  - 13 November – The first edition of the medical magazine Stayin' Alive is broadcast. The new show is presented by David Jensen.
  - 17 November – Tommy Vance, one of the station's original presenters, rejoins the station to present a new show, The Friday Rock Show. Consequently, John Peel is now on air four nights a week instead of five.
  - 23 November – Radio 1 moves from 247m (1214 kHz) to 275 & 285m (1053 & 1089 kHz) medium wave as part of a plan to improve national AM reception and to conform with the Geneva Frequency Plan of 1975.
  - 22 December – Industrial action at the BBC by the ABS union which started the previous day, extends to radio when the radio unions join their television counterparts by going on strike. It forces the BBC to merge its four national radio networks into one national radio station from 4pm named the BBC All Network Radio Service. The strike is settled shortly before 10pm on the same day with the unions and BBC management reaching an agreement at the government's industrial disputes arbitration service, Acas.
- 1979
  - 29 January – Radio 1 begins its delayed weeknight mid-evening show with Andy Peebles joining the station to host it. It had originally been scheduled to launch on 13 November 1978, but was delayed as a result of trade union disputes.
  - 26 August – Simon Bates steps down from Sunday Top 40 hosting.
  - 2 September – Tony Blackburn replaces Simon Bates as host of the Sunday Top 40.
  - 30 December – Annie Nightingale quits the presenting job of the Sunday request show. Her show is taken over by a three-person rotation, consisting of Stuart Colman, Paul Gambaccini, and John Peel, until it briefly leaves the airwaves in April 1980.

== 1980s ==
- 1980
  - 5 January
    - Tony Blackburn replaces Ed Stewart as host of Junior Choice, as Stewart leaves the station to join Radio 2.
    - Steve Wright joins the station to present the Saturday evening show.
  - 31 March – Radio 1's broadcast hours are cut back. The station starts broadcasting on weekdays an hour later and Saturday evening programming ends. The station simulcasts Radio 2 during this additional downtime until August, when Radio 1 closes down at 7:30pm, after In Concert, shown on Rock on Saturday, presented by Tommy Vance.
  - 29 May – David Jensen leaves the station for a while to work for the Turner Broadcasting System WTBS cable superstation in Atlanta, Georgia. His drivetime show is taken over by Paul Gambaccini, Peter Powell and Newsbeat anchorman Richard Skinner during that period, before Powell permanently takes over the time slot on 1 September. In addition, Jensen is replaced on Stayin' Alive by Andy Peebles.
  - 6 December – Andy Peebles interviews John Lennon and Yoko Ono in New York City, two days before Lennon is assassinated.
- 1981
  - 2 January – Dave Lee Travis steps down from presenting the Radio 1 breakfast show.
  - 5 January – Mike Read succeeds Dave Lee Travis as presenter of the Radio 1 breakfast show.
  - 11 February – Listeners in London are, from this day, able to hear Radio 1 on VHF and in stereo on weeknights between 8pm and 10pm. This begins on the day that BBC Radio London begins broadcasting in stereo. BBC Radio London switches to Radio 2 at 10pm when Radio 1 begins its nightly 'borrow' of Radio 2's VHF frequencies.
  - 30 March – Steve Wright, who joined the station the previous year, takes over the weekday afternoon slot. His new show, later named Steve Wright in the Afternoon, brings the zoo format to British radio.
  - 5 October – David Jensen returns to the station to present a new weekday evening show from 8pm to 10pm.
- 1982
  - 3 January – Tony Blackburn hosts the Sunday Top 40 for the final time, as he counts down the best selling singles of 1981.
  - 10 January – Tommy Vance replaces Tony Blackburn as host of the Sunday Top 40 show.
  - 27 February – The final edition of Playground is broadcast. It is replaced by a Saturday early breakfast show, Wake up to the Weekend, presented by Adrian John.
  - 28 February – The final edition of Junior Choice is broadcast.
  - 6 March – After the end of Junior Choice, the weekend show is renamed as Tony Blackburn's Saturday/Sunday Show, with Toni Arthur (who would leave in June), Maggie Philbin and Keith Chegwin (who were both on Playground) joining Tony Blackburn as co-presenters.
  - 9–10 April – Radio 1 broadcasts a non-stop Marathon Music Quiz, featuring two teams, one representing Radio 1 and the other, the music industry. It runs continuously for twenty-six hours, plus three-hundred-eight-five minutes, with Mike Read as quizmaster for the whole of the quiz. Some portions are broadcast live.
  - 6 September – Pat Sharp makes his first appearance on the station, standing in for Steve Wright.
  - 4 October – Mike Smith, who was a researcher on Radio 1 in the 1970s, makes his first appearance as a presenter on the station, standing in for Peter Powell.
  - 23 October – Paul Burnett leaves the station. His Saturday mid-morning show is taken over by Mike Smith, in his first permanent show.
  - 4–6 December – The transmission time lost in March 1980 is regained. Shows once again begin at 6am, finally ending all simulcasts between Radio 1 and Radio 2. Mike Smith is the first presenter of the new weekday early show. A Sunday early breakfast show is also introduced, with Pat Sharp permanently joining the station to host it. The station also recommences Saturday evening broadcasting with Janice Long and Gary Davies also debuting on the station to present the new shows. Programming is also extended by two hours on Sunday evenings with Annie Nightingale's request show returning to the airwaves after two years away. Thus, Radio 1 is now on air daily from 6am until midnight.
  - 20 December – The final edition of Stayin' Alive is broadcast.
- 1983
  - 27 March – Noel Edmonds leaves the station. His Sunday mid-morning show is taken over by Adrian Juste, who continues to present his Saturday lunchtime show.
  - 2 April – The first edition of the Saturday afternoon magazine show Saturday Live is broadcast. It is hosted by Richard Skinner and Andy Batten-Foster.
  - 4 April – Adrian John takes over the weekday early show from Mike Smith, who takes over the weekday lunchtime show from Dave Lee Travis.
  - 1 October – Mark Page joins, to take over the Saturday early slot from Adrian John, who continues in the same position on weekdays. In addition, Page replaces Pat Sharp as the Sunday early show presenter.
  - 18 December – Sounds of Jazz is broadcast on Radio 1 for the final time. From the new year, the show would be broadcast on Radio 2.
- 1984
  - 1 January
    - Tommy Vance steps down from hosting the Top 40 show, as he counts down the best selling singles of 1983.
    - Robbie Vincent, who has made appearances on Radio 1 since 1977, joins the station on a permanent basis to present a Sunday evening soul, funk, jazz and fusion music show. He takes over the time slot from an hour-long show hosted by Andy Peebles and from the first hour of Sounds of Jazz, with the latter show's last hour being taken over by the repeat of a ten-show series about the history of Jamaican music, called From Mento to Lovers' Rock, which is written and hosted by Linton Kwesi Johnson.
  - 8 January – Simon Bates returns to the Sunday teatime Top 40 show.
  - 11 March – After standing in for Paul Gambaccini's American chart show the previous December, Gary Byrd officially joins the station to present the gospel music series Gary Byrd's Sweet Inspirations. It replaces the repeat of From Mento to Lovers' Rock in the Sunday night time slot.
  - 26 March – Gary Davies replaces Mike Smith as the host of the weekday lunchtime show, as the latter leaves the slot to present BBC1's Breakfast Time. From then on, Smith's voice would be only heard on documentaries and special shows, until he would take over the breakfast show in 1986.
  - 31 March – Dixie Peach joins the station to take over Gary Davies' Saturday evening show.
  - 28 June – David Jensen leaves the station to join Capital Radio. He is briefly replaced by Richard Skinner, before Janice Long takes over on 3 September.
  - 10 September – Bruno Brookes replaces Peter Powell as the presenter of the teatime show. He had been with the station since January, deputising for holidaying presenters on an ad-hoc basis. In addition, Brookes stood in for Mike Read's evening show for a week in 1980.
  - 23 September – Tony Blackburn, the first voice heard on Radio 1, presents his final show as he leaves the station to rejoin BBC Radio London.
  - 29 September – The weekend breakfast show is revamped with Peter Powell replacing Tony Blackburn as the presenter. The children's requests element of the show is dropped.
  - 30 September – Richard Skinner replaces Simon Bates as the host of the Sunday teatime Top 40 show.
  - 4 October – Tommy Vance presents the first edition of a new weekly show called Into the Music. It airs on Thursday evenings, thus reducing John Peel's presence on the station, as the latter is now on air three evenings a week instead of four.
  - Rod McKenzie joins.
- 1985
  - 1 March – Johnny Beerling replaces Derek Chinnery as the station's controller.
  - 31 March – The Ranking Miss P becomes the station's first black female DJ where she begins presenting Culture Rock, which is the station's first reggae show. She takes over the Sunday evening time slot from Gary Byrd's Sweet Inspirations.
  - 13 April – The station's studios move to Egton House.
  - 6 July – Andy Kershaw joins the station, to present an hour-long show on Saturday mid-evenings until 28 September taking over briefly the time slot from In Concert, before succeeding Tommy Vance's Into the Music on Thursday nights from 3 October.
  - 13 July – Radio 1 broadcasts complete coverage of the Live Aid concert.
  - 21 September – Andy Batten-Foster presents his final edition of Saturday Live. As a result, Richard Skinner now presents the show on his own.
- 1986
  - 15 February – Paul Gambaccini presents his final American chart show, as he leaves the station for a while to join Capital Radio. He is replaced on Saturday afternoons by a similar series called The American Chart Show, presented by Gary Byrd.
  - 10 March – Simon Mayo makes his first appearance on the station, standing in for Gary Davies.
  - 23 March – Richard Skinner presents the Sunday Top 40 for the final time.
  - 29 March – Richard Skinner leaves the station for a while to join Capital Radio. He is first replaced on Saturday Live by Mark Page, who was then succeeded by Andy Kershaw in July.
  - 30 March – Bruno Brookes takes over as the host of the Sunday Top 40 show.
  - 18 April – After five years, Mike Read presents his final breakfast show on the station. Adrian John then hosts the show for the following two weeks, with Andy Peebles standing in on John's usual early breakfast slot during that time.
  - 3 May – Simon Mayo permanently joins the station to present the Saturday mid-evening show. He replaces Annemarie Grey in this time slot.
  - 5 May – After standing in for Mike Read during the previous Summer, Mike Smith returns to a regular slot, taking over Radio 1's breakfast show. The same day also sees the station begin broadcasting on weekdays thirty minutes earlier at 5:30am.
  - 9 May – The record review show format returns to Radio 1, as Singled Out makes its debut that day. It is hosted by Janice Long.
- 1987
  - 17 January – Johnnie Walker rejoins the station to present a new Saturday afternoon show with The Stereo Sequence. It runs for 5 1/2 hours and incorporates the weekly look at the American charts (now hosted by Laura Gross), which is shortened to an hour, and In Concert, which were both previously stand-alone Saturday afternoon shows.
  - 18 January – As a result to the launch of The Stereo Sequence, Saturday Live (previously a stand-alone Saturday afternoon show) moves to Sunday afternoons (under the new title of Sunday Live), replacing the old concert series Vintage American Bandstand, hosted by Annie Nightingale.
  - 3–4 October – Radio 1 makes some changes, as Simon Mayo replaces Mark Page as the weekend early show presenter. Mike Read takes over Dave Lee Travis' Saturday mid-morning show, with Travis keeping his Sunday mid-morning show. In addition, Read also takes over the Sunday lunchtime "retro" timeslot from Jimmy Savile. Robbie Vincent replaces Simon Mayo's Saturday mid-evening show, while Nicky Campbell joins the station to replace Dixie Peach as the Saturday evening presenter. On Sunday, the game show Radio Scruples, hosted by Simon Mayo, makes its debut, while Liz Kershaw and Ro Newton joins the station to present the magazine show Backchat. Both shows replace Sunday Live and the weekly highlights show Radio 1 More Time (which would return in April). Also from this day, the new Top 40 is released on the Sunday afternoon chart show. Previously, the show had played songs from the chart which had been released the previous Tuesday. Finally, Andy Peebles's Soul Train makes its debut, taking over Robbie Vincent's Sunday evening time slot.
  - 9 October – Mike Read replaces Janice Long as presenter of the Singled Out record review show, and Jeff Young, who has done stand-ins for Robbie Vincent since 1985, joins the station on a permanent basis to present a new weekly Friday evening dance and rap music show.
  - 31 October – Radio 1 begins launching its FM frequency, starting in London, initially on 104.8 MHz before moving to the 97–99 frequency range allocated to the station.
  - 8 November – Bruno Brookes reveals the 600th UK No. 1 single as "China in Your Hand" by T'Pau. Over the following three weeks and to mark the musical milestone, Radio 1 plays all 600 singles to have reached number one since the UK Singles Chart was launched in 1952.
  - 26 December – Nicky Campbell replaces Simon Mayo as the presenter of the weekend early morning show, with Campbell's Saturday night show being taken over by Mark Goodier, who joins the station.
  - 30 December – Janice Long leaves the station. She is replaced as the weekday mid-evening presenter by Simon Mayo.
- 1988
  - 18 January – The station has a More Music Day which limited presenter chat to news, weather and travel. Designed as an answer to those who thought that DJs talk too much, it has not been repeated since.
  - 23 May – Simon Mayo takes over as presenter of Radio 1's breakfast show, replacing Mike Smith who leaves the station. The new show takes on a zoo format by introducing co-hosts and new features.
  - 25 June – Johnnie Walker ends his second stint at the station as he leaves for a while and Roger Scott takes over as host of The Stereo Sequence. This is not Scott's first appearance on the station, however, as he presented eight shows from 1972 to 1973 under the name of Bob Baker.
  - 29 August – Radio 1 borrows Radio 2’s FM frequencies on a bank holiday afternoon for the final time.
  - 1 September
    - The Radio 1 FM 'switch on' day which sees three new transmitters brought into service covering central Scotland, the north of England and the Midlands. With 65% of the UK now covered by the station's new FM frequency, the pop duo Bros fly around the country in a helicopter to encourage listeners to switch over.
    - To coincide with the switch-ons, Top of the Pops is simulcast on the station for the first time giving listeners the chance to hear the show in stereo.
  - 25 September – Peter Powell leaves the station.
  - 29 September
    - Radio 1 'borrows' Radio 2's FM frequencies on a weeknight for the final time.
    - Radio 1 starts broadcasting on FM stereo in South Wales and the South West of England. To mark the event, that day's breakfast show is broadcast live from the Severn Bridge.
  - 1 October
    - Radio 1 extends its broadcasting hours, closing down at 2am instead of midnight. This results in a new weekday evening schedule with John Peel moving to an earlier evening slot, Nicky Campbell taking over the late show and Richard Skinner rejoining the station, after two years with Capital Radio, to host the new midnight to 2am show.
    - The first edition of Night Rockin' is broadcast on Saturday nights. The new show is presented by Tommy Vance.
    - Mark Goodier and Liz Kershaw take over as presenters of Radio 1's weekend breakfast show, which now starts at 6am, briefly dropping the early breakfast show, which was most recently hosted by Nicky Campbell.
    - The Stereo Sequence is renamed The Saturday Sequence.
  - 2 October
    - Radio 1 stops borrowing Radio 2's FM frequencies on Sunday evenings after 7pm.
    - The Top 40 is the only remaining show left to continue to borrow Radio 2's frequencies between 5pm and 7pm on Sundays.
    - The first edition of Scott on Sunday is broadcast, taking the Sunday evening timeslot from Culture Rock. The new show is hosted by Roger Scott.
  - 24 November – Radio 1 starts broadcasting on FM in Belfast and Oxfordshire with a simulcast of Top of the Pops. To mark the event, the next day's breakfast show and Simon Bates shows are broadcast live from the two areas.
- 1989
  - Some BBC Local Radio stations broadcast Radio 1 during their evening downtime, doing so because Radio 1's network of FM transmitters does not currently cover their broadcast area.
  - 14 January – Alan Freeman rejoins the station to replace Tommy Vance as the presenter of the Saturday night rock show.
  - 1 April – Radio 1 starts broadcasting slightly earlier each morning and is now on air between 5am and 2am seven days a week. The weekend early show is reintroduced, now presented by Tim Smith, who joins the station, and Bruno Brookes replaces Mark Goodier as co-host of weekend breakfast with Liz Kershaw.
  - 20 May – The first edition of Classic Albums is broadcast. The documentary series is produced and presented by Roger Scott.
  - 1 July – Jackie Brambles joins the station, taking over the weekend early show from Tim Smith until September.
  - 3 July–13 September – Simon Bates and producer Jonathan Ruffle set off on an eighty-day circumnavigation of the world to raise money for Oxfam. Their progress is charted in a broadcast each weekday morning.
  - 29 September – Adrian John leaves the station after presenting the weekday early show for the past six years. He is replaced by Jackie Brambles. He would later return on the weekday early morning show during the final week of 1992 to stand in for Bruno Brookes.
  - 8 October – Roger Scott hosts his final show before his death.
  - 31 October – Roger Scott dies four weeks after his final Radio 1 show. Richard Skinner takes over the hosting duties for The Saturday Sequence, and Andy Peebles briefly takes over Scott's Sunday late show until the end of the year.
  - 19 December – Radio 1 starts transmitting on FM across the whole of south-east England (replacing the temporary London transmitter), in East Anglia, in north Cumbria and south Scotland and in the Cardigan Bay area.
  - 30 December – Radio 1 broadcasts on Radio 2's FM frequencies on Saturday afternoons for the final time and Robbie Vincent leaves.

== 1990s ==
- 1990
  - 7 January – Bob Harris rejoins the station as Roger Scott's Sunday late show replacement.
  - 8 January
    - A new thirty-minute news bulletin, News 90, replaces the fifteen-minute teatime edition of Newsbeat. It is presented by Sybil Ruscoe and Allan Robb.
    - A new jingles package, Music Radio for the 90s, is launched.
  - 11 February – Radio 1 starts broadcasting on FM in most of south-west England.
  - 12 March – Gary King makes his first appearance on the station, standing-in for Jackie Brambles. He permanently joins the station that same weekend to replace Tim Smith as the weekend early breakfast show presenter.
  - 25 March – Radio 1 'borrows' Radio 2's FM frequencies for the final time. However, Radio 1 on FM is still unavailable in some parts of England so some BBC local radio stations broadcast the Top 40 show so that many listeners in England where Radio 1 is still only available on MW can continue to hear the programme in stereo.
  - 12 April – Radio 1 starts broadcasting on FM throughout north-east England (having previously had a low-power transmitter for Newcastle upon Tyne for a period). As a result, Simon Bates, Steve Wright, and Mark Goodier present their shows from Tyne and Wear on the two days following the switch-on. In addition, Tommy Vance hosts a special Friday Rock Show live from Newcastle to mark the occasion.
  - 24 May – Radio 1 begins FM transmission in the south of England, with Steve Wright's show broadcast from Goodwood Racecourse to mark the occasion.
  - 27 July – Radio 1 starts broadcasting on FM in Lincolnshire and East Yorkshire.
  - 3 September – Gary King replaces Jackie Brambles as the host of the weekday early morning show, with the latter moving to the teatime show, replacing Mark Goodier.
  - 28 September – The Ranking Miss P leaves the station. Her timeslot is taken over by a new series of The Mary Whitehouse Experience and by Andy Peebles Soul Train.
  - 29 September – Jenny Costello joins the station to replace Gary King as the host of Radio 1's weekend early morning show. In addition, John Peel's show moves to weekend evenings.
  - 30 September – Mark Goodier replaces Bruno Brookes as host of Radio 1's Top 40 show.
  - 1 October – A new music show called The Evening Session makes its debut on the station. It is presented by Mark Goodier.
  - 3 October – The Man Ezeke joins the station to present a reggae show named The Man Ezeke Sunshine Show on Wednesday evenings.
  - Radio 1 starts broadcasting split travel bulletins during the Simon Mayo Breakfast Show. This allows for the London area to receive a separate bulletin from the rest of the country. One is broadcast live, the other recorded during the preceding record.
- 1991
  - 6 January – For the first time, Radio 1's Sunday chart show plays the whole of the Top 40. As a result, the show is renamed The Complete Top 40, and its duration is increased, starting half an hour earlier at 4:30pm.
  - 11 January – Pete Tong, who regularly apperared on Peter Powell's teatime show from 1982 to 1983, permanently joins the station to launch The Essential Selection. It replaces Jeff Young's Big Beat as the Friday evening dance music show.
  - 4 April – Pete Tong presents the first edition of the station's first show dedicated solely to rap music. Called The Rap Selection, it is a continuation of the National Fresh segment in Jeff Young's Friday night show. It is broadcast on Thursday evenings, taking over the timeslot from Classic Documentary repeats.
  - 8 April – Mark Radcliffe, who is producing various shows on both Radio 1 and Radio 2 since 1983, in addition to presenting Hit the North on the recently launched Radio 5, makes his debut on Radio 1 as the host of a new Monday evening show called Out on Blue Six.
  - 1 May – Radio 1 begins broadcasting a continuous twenty-four hours service on a permanent basis, but only on FM as the station's MW frequencies are switched off each night between midnight and 6am. As a result, Neale James joins the station to present the new weekend overnight show.
  - 29 June – Paul McKenna joins the station to replace Jenny Costello as the presenter of Radio 1's weekend early morning show.
  - 5–30 August – Phil Collins, The Pet Shop Boys, Jason Donovan, and Whitney Houston are the Bates' Mates who deputises for Simon Bates on Radio 1.
  - 26 August – After being a stand-in presenter for the previous year, Tim Smith leaves the station.
  - 29 August – Top of the Pops is simulcast on Radio 1 for the last time. Starting the following Thursday, its time slot is replaced by an extension of Jackie Brambles' drivetime show.
  - 27 September – Mike Read leaves the station to join Capital Radio. He is replaced on Round Table by Jackie Brambles.
  - 28 September – Paul Gambaccini rejoins the station to present a fourteen-part series about pop and rock's most influential figures, and after standing in for Nicky Campbell's weekday evening show in July, Johnnie Walker permanently rejoins the station for the third time, replacing Richard Skinner as the Saturday afternoon presenter. As a result, The Saturday Sequence title is retired.
  - 15 December – Paul McKenna leaves the station after six months. He is replaced as the presenter of Radio 1's weekend early morning show by Neale James, with Lynn Parsons joining the station to take over the latter's weekend overnight show.
- 1992
  - 9 February – The final edition of Bruno Brookes' and Liz Kershaw's Radio 1's weekend breakfast show is broadcast as the latter leaves the station, ahead of major changes to the station's weekend programming line-up. Johnnie Walker hosts the show in the interim.
  - 21 February – Gary Davies presents his final weekday lunchtime show.
  - 24 February – Jackie Brambles replaces Gary Davies as presenter of the weekday lunchtime show.
  - 9–15 March – The station undergoes a schedule revamp with several changes during the week, with Bruno Brookes replacing Gary King as the presenter for the weekday early morning show, and Mark Goodier returning to the drivetime slot with a new show, Mark Goodier's Mega Hits, which also takes over the Friday timeslot from Round Table. In addition, John Peel's show returns to Friday evenings. Among the weekend changes are Gary Davies becoming host of the station's weekend breakfast show and Andy Kershaw's show moving to Saturday evenings, replacing In Concert, which moves to Thursday evenings, taking over the slot from The Rap Selection. On Sundays, Chris Evans joins the station to succeed Phillip Schofield as the presenter of the Sunday early-afternoon show called Too Much Gravy, and afterwards, Bruno Brookes begins his second stint as host of the UK Top 40 show. It is extended once again and now airs from 4pm until 7pm, allowing sufficient time for all songs to be played in full. In addition, Gary Davies gets a new Sunday evening show, taking over both Andy Kershaw and John Peel slots. The changes also see the introduction of a new jingles package, based on the theme Closer to the Music.
  - 20 April – The Freddie Mercury Tribute Concert for AIDS Awareness, an open-air concert in tribute to singer Freddie Mercury who died in November 1991, is held at London's Wembley Stadium. The concert is broadcast on Radio 1 and televised on BBC2.
  - 2 May – Andy Peebles leaves the station.
  - 26 May – Richard Skinner leaves the station. His final appearance on Radio 1 is also the final edition of Classic Albums.
  - 30 August – 100,000 people attend Radio 1's biggest ever Radio 1 Roadshow to celebrate the twenty-fifth anniversary of the station. The event, named Party in the Park, is held at Sutton Park in the West Midlands, and features live performances from bands including Del Amitri, The Farm and Status Quo.
  - 27 September – Chris Evans leaves the station for a while to co-present Channel 4's new breakfast show The Big Breakfast with Gaby Roslin. His time slot is taken over by a new show named Rockline, hosted by Neale James. Evans would return to the station on 30 December to present a best of his show.
  - 27 December – Pick of the Pops is broadcast on Radio 1 for the final time. It is replaced the following week by a similar show, Number Ones on 1 FM, presented by The Man Ezeke.
- 1993
  - Marc Riley joins the station.
  - 6 January – Steve Edwards joins the station to present a soul show on Wednesday evenings, replacing The Man Ezeke Sunshine Show.
  - 1 March – Claire Sturgess makes her first appearance on the station to stand-in for Mark Goodier on the Evening Session.
  - 15 March – Jo Whiley joins on the station to stand-in for Mark Goodier on the Evening Session.
  - 2 April – After nearly fifteen years of presenting The Friday Rock Show, Tommy Vance leaves the station to join the new station Virgin 1215, and Claire Sturgess permanently joins the station two weeks later to take over this show. In addition, Sturgess takes over the Monday overnight show from Lynn Parsons, who moves in an earlier timeslot to present a sixty-minute show called The Official 1 FM Album Chart, which airs immediately after the Top 40 singles chart.
  - 13 April – Steve Lamacq makes his first appearance on the station, standing in for Mark Goodier on the Evening Session.
  - 8 August – Dave Lee Travis resigns on air and leaves the station stating that he could not agree with changes that were being made to Radio 1. He tells his audience that changes are afoot that he could not tolerate "and I really want to put the record straight at this point and I thought you ought to know, changes are being made here which go against my principles and I just cannot agree with them". Travis' weekend morning programmes are briefly taken over by Claire Sturgess on Saturdays, and by Nicky Campbell on Sundays.
  - 16 August–20 September – Loud'n'proud, a series presented from Manchester by DJ Paulette, is the first British national radio programme aimed at a gay and lesbian audience.
  - 30 August – Steve Lamacq and Jo Whiley both join the station on a permanent basis, as they replace Mark Goodier as the presenters for The Evening Session.
  - 3 September – After five years, Simon Mayo leaves the Radio 1 breakfast show.
  - 6 September – Mark Goodier takes over as presenter of the Radio 1 breakfast show and hosts it until the end of the year.
  - 25–30 October – Major changes take place, designed to reposition the station to attract a younger audience, with Matthew Bannister replacing Johnny Beerling as controller. Simon Mayo takes over weekday mid-mornings from Simon Bates, and Mark Radcliffe takes over the late night 10pm–midnight slot from Nicky Campbell, who temporary leaves the station to take care for his ailing wife. In addition, Lynn Parsons takes over from Bob Harris on the overnight show, with her weekend overnight show being taking over by Mark Tonderai, who joins the station, and Danny Baker also joins the station to permanently take over the weekend mid-morning show. Other changes include Andy Kershaw and John Peel moving from nighttime to Saturday afternoons, replacing Alan Freeman's The Saturday Rock Show, while In Concert is again incorporated in Johnnie Walker's show, and Essential Mix, a new show hosted by Pete Tong, makes its debut on the station. Finally, the Friday Rock Show name is retired after almost fifteen years, as the show moves to Sunday afternoons, as a result to the end of Number Ones on 1 FM and the departure of The Man Ezeke from the station.
  - 24 December – Steve Wright in the Afternoon ends its thirteen-year run on Radio 1. It would return on Radio 2 in July 1999.
  - 25 December – Two months after leaving his weekday mid-morning slot, Simon Bates makes his last appearance on the station, presenting a seasonal special about Whitney Houston.
- 1994
  - 1 January
    - Kevin Greening joins the station and takes over the weekend breakfast show from Gary Davies.
    - After fifteen years of presenting the Sunday lunchtime show, Adrian Juste leaves the station. His timeslot is taken over by Apache Indian, who joins the station.
  - 10 January – Steve Wright becomes Radio 1's latest breakfast show presenter. Other changes on this day see Emma Freud joing the station to replace Jackie Brambles as the lunchtime presenter, as the latter leaves the station for a career in America, with Mark Goodier taking over the afternoon show, and Nicky Campbell returning to the station to take over the drivetime show. In addition, the teatime edition of Newsbeat returns after four years away, being replaced by News 90/91/92/93/94. The bulletin airs in its old slot between 5:30 and 5:45pm, incorporated in Campbell's show.
  - 1 May – Annie Nightingale hosts the request show for the final time, having presented it on-and-off since 1975. Lynn Parsons takes over as its presenter the following week.
  - 8 May
    - In the early hours of Sunday morning, Annie Nightingale launches her career as a club music DJ, presenting the first edition of The Chill Out Zone.
    - The station's Sunday rock show moves to mid-evenings, swapping slots with the Steve Edwards Soul Show.
  - June – Radio 1 begins broadcasting announcements on its medium wave frequency voiced by Nicky Campbell, telling listeners to retune to FM because it will no longer be broadcasting on medium wave from 1 July.
  - 25 June – For its final week of broadcasting on MW, the station broadcasts on the frequency only between 6am and 9am.
  - 1 July – Radio 1's final broadcast on medium wave. Stephen Duffy's "Kiss Me" is the last record played on MW just before 9am.
  - 11 July – Lisa I'Anson makes her first appearance on the station to stand-in for Claire Sturgess' Sunday overnight show.
  - 19 November – Clive Warren joins the station and takes over the weekend breakfast show from Kevin Greening, who moves to the weekend lunchtime slot. Among other changes to the weekend schedule include Simon Mayo taking over the Sunday mid-morning show from Danny Baker, who continues to present the Saturday mid-morning show, and Andy Kershaw replacing the Sunday night request show. In addition, Johnnie Walker's Saturday mid-evening show moves back to afternoons, as Danny Rampling joins the station to take over the Saturday mid-evening show, after making two appearances on the Essential Mix.
  - 9 December – Emma Freud leaves the station, and is replaced on the weekly lunchtime show by Lisa I'Anson, who permanently joins the station.
  - 10 December – Tim Westwood joins the station to present the station's first long-standing rap show.
  - 29 December – Alan Freeman leaves the station, after the end of a fifty-two part documentary called The Story of Pop, a new version of the 1973 twenty-six part documentary of the same name.
  - Radio 1 starts broadcasting on satellite, using audio carriers on the Astra satellite.
- 1995
  - Radio 1's FM network is completed and the station now has the same coverage on FM as the other BBC national stations.
  - Having been known on air as Radio 1 FM or even simply as 1FM since the start of the decade in order to promote the station's move to FM, the on air name reverts to Radio 1.
  - January – As part of major changes taking place at Radio 1, older music (typically anything recorded before 1990) is dropped from the daytime playlist.
  - 26 March – Neale James leaves the station. He is replaced as the presenter of the weekend early breakfast show by Lynn Parsons.
  - 8 April – Dave Pearce makes his first appearance on the station, to stand-in for Lynn Parsons' weekend early breakfast show.
  - 21 April – Bruno Brookes and Steve Wright present their final shows on the station.
  - 23 April – After Bruno Brookes' departure, Mark Goodier begins his second stint as presenter of the Sunday afternoon Top 40 show.
  - 24 April – Chris Evans rejoins Radio 1 to take over the station's breakfast show, and Dave Pearce officially joins the station to take over the early breakfast show.
  - 30 April – The station's Rock Show is now broadcast from Glasgow. As a result, John Cavanagh joins the station to replace Claire Sturgess as its presenter.
  - 1 May – Wendy Lloyd present her first show on the station, standing in for Lisa I'Anson. Lloyd then officially joins the station the following week, taking over the weekday overnight show from Lynn Parsons.
  - July – The station holds its first Ibiza weekend.
  - 20 July – One in the Jungle, the first national radio jungle showcase, makes its debut on the station as the Summer replacement for Soundbite.
  - 11 September – Mary Anne Hobbs makes her first appearance on the station, as a guest reviewer on Collins and Maconie's Hit Parade.
  - 27 September – Radio 1 begins to broadcast digitally following the commencement by the BBC of regular Digital Audio Broadcasting from the Crystal Palace transmitting station.
  - 21 October – Ahead of a schedule revamp, Johnnie Walker leaves the station. His show is taken over by Jo Whiley, and In Concert returns as a stand-in show. Other schedule changes include Kevin Greening returning to Radio 1's weekend breakfast show, replacing Clive Warren, who succeeds Dave Pearce on the weekday early breakfast show. The latter takes over Danny Baker and Simon Mayo's weekend mid-morning shows, with Baker moving to the Saturday lunchtime slot. In addition, a weekend breakfast edition of Newsbeat, presented by Peter Bowes, is also introduced.
- 1996
  - 23 January – Mary Anne Hobbs joins the station on a permanent basis, to replace Wendy Lloyd as Mark Kermode's co-presenter on the Tuesday evening show Cling Film.
  - 4 February – Trevor Nelson joins the station to present the UK's first national R&B show Rhythm Nation. He replaces Steve Edwards' Soul on Sunday.
  - 24 March – Lynn Parsons leaves the station and is replaced on the weekend early breakfast show by Charlie Jordan, who joins the station.
  - 14 April – The final edition of Radio 1 Rock Show is broadcast. The show's timeslot is taken over by John Peel, who continues in his Saturday teatime slot, while being replaced on his Friday evening spot by the permanent return of One in the Jungle.
  - 20 June – The station's website is launched during the Evening Session.
  - 27 June – Wendy Lloyd leaves the station. She is replaced as the weekday overnight presenter by Claire Sturgess, who is already in the same position on Saturdays.
  - 21 September – Danny Baker leaves the station to rejoin BBC Radio London.
  - 9 October – Radio 1 moves from Egton House to Yalding House.
- 1997
  - 31 January – Chris Evans leaves the Radio 1 breakfast show and the station, after he was dismissed for demanding Fridays off to work on his Channel 4 show TFI Friday. As a result, Simon Mayo temporarily returns to the show as its interim host, with Kevin Greening taking over Mayo's mid-morning show during the interim period.
  - 17 February
    - Mark and Lard become the breakfast show's new presenters.
    - Jo Whiley begins presenting a weekday lunchtime show.
  - 3 May – Lisa I'Anson moves to weekends, replacing Claire Sturgess, who took over the Saturday afternoon timeslot from Jo Whiley in February.
  - 27 July – The first edition of Radio 1's Dance Anthems is broadcast, hosted by Dave Pearce.
  - 28 July – Chris Moyles joins and becomes the new host of the early breakfast show.
  - 17 August – Claire Sturgess leaves the station.
  - 31 August – Regular programming on the BBC's radio and television stations is abandoned to provide ongoing news coverage of the death of Diana, Princess of Wales with Radio 1 airing a special show from BBC Radio News which is also carried on Radio 2, Radio 3, Radio 4 and Radio 5 Live and The Official Chart doesn't air for the first time.
  - 3 October – Nicky Campbell leaves the station to join Radio 5 Live.
  - 13 October – Mark and Lard move to an afternoon slot and Zoe Ball joins the station, as Kevin Greening and herself replace them as presenters of the breakfast show.
  - 17 October – After making apperances on the Essential Mix since 1994, Judge Jules joins the station on a permanent basis to host a Friday night show and a Saturday afternoon programme.
- 1998
  - Fabio and Grooverider join.
  - March – Andy Parfitt replaces Matthew Bannister as station controller.
  - April – Emma B, Aled Haydn Jones and Gilles Peterson join.
  - 25 September – Kevin Greening leaves the weekday breakfast show, leaving Zoe Ball as its sole presenter as he moves back to weekends to replace Clive Warren as host of the Sunday weekend breakfast show.
  - 12 October – Chris Moyles replaces Dave Pearce who moves to a new evening show. Scott Mills joins the station as the new host of early breakfast.
- 1999
  - February – Lisa I'Anson leaves.
  - 24 April – Jamie Theakston joins.
  - 26 July–27 August – The Radio 1 Roadshow is broadcast for the final time.
  - 19 August – Radio 1 broadcasts its first split programming when it introduces weekly national new music shows for Scotland, Wales and Northern Ireland. The Welsh presenters are Huw Stephens and Bethan Elfyn, who both join the station.
  - 2 September – Colin Murray joins.
  - 19 September – The first edition of a new Sunday evening advice show called The Surgery is broadcast and Sara Cox joins.
  - 25 September – Sara Cox co-hosts a new Saturday lunchtime show with Emma B.
  - Radio 1's Live Lounge is established and launched as part of the mid-morning show with Simon Mayo, later Jo Whiley and Fearne Cotton and later Clara Amfo and Rickie, Melvin and Charlie.

== 2000s ==
- 2000
  - 16 January – Kevin Greening leaves the station to join Radio 5 Live. The following week, a new weekend breakfast show, The Breakfast Club, hosted by Sarah HB, launches as Sarah herself joins the station.
  - 10 March – Zoe Ball presents the Radio 1 breakfast show for the final time as she leaves the station. Scott Mills begins a three-week stint as the show's temporary presenter. By coincidence, Mills would succeed Ball as the presenter of the Radio 2 breakfast show 25 years later.
  - 31 March – Sara Cox takes over as presenter of the Radio 1 breakfast show three days early and Mark Chapman joins and starts hosting his first ever Newsbeat sports bulletins.
  - 16 June – Andy Kershaw leaves to join Radio 3. He had presented the station's world music show since 1985.
  - September – Clive Warren leaves.
  - October – Nemone joins.
  - The Dreem Teem join.
  - BBC Radio 1's Big Weekend takes place for the first time.
- 2001
  - 19 February – Jo Whiley takes over the morning show and begins presenting The Jo Whiley Show. She replaces Simon Mayo who leaves to join Radio 5 Live and Radio 2.
  - 10 May – Radio 1 loses its crown as the UK's most listened to radio station to Radio 2.
  - Radio 1, along with other stations, stop broadcasting via Sky's analogue satellite service.
- 2002
  - March – Danny Rampling leaves and Rob da Bank, Bobby Friction and Nihal join.
  - 16 August – Sister station BBC Radio 1Xtra launches.
  - 28 September – Jamie Theakston leaves.
  - 31 October – The Evening Session is broadcast for the final time.
  - 17 November – Mark Goodier presents the Top 40 for the final time on the 50th anniversary of the chart and leaves the station due to falling audiences and BBC bosses considering him "too old for the job."
- 2003
  - 9 February – Wes Butters joins and becomes the new presenter of The Official Chart. Various presenters had hosted the show since Mark Goodier's departure in November 2002.
  - 29 March – Edith Bowman joins as Colin Murray and Edith herself present their shows together until 2006.
  - 3 May – Radio 1 cancels the first day of their Big Weekend at Heaton Park, Manchester due to poor weather. However, the second day of the event goes ahead as scheduled.
  - 7 September – Sarah HB hosts her final show as she leaves the station.
  - 13–14 September – Radio 1's second One Big Weekend festival takes place at Cardiff.
  - 19 December – Sara Cox presents her final breakfast show and Chris Moyles presents his final drivetime show.
  - Zane Lowe joins the station to present a new weeknight evening show.
  - The Dreem Teem leave.
- 2004
  - 4 January – Vernon Kay joins.
  - 5 January – Chris Moyles takes over the breakfast show with a return of the zoo format and Sara Cox moves to drivetime until her maternity leave.
  - 26 March – Mark and Lard (Mark Radcliffe and Marc Riley) present their final show as Radcliffe leaves the station to join Radio 2 and Riley also leaves the station to join Radio 6 Music after 11 years of broadcasting and one failed eight-month stint on the Radio 1 breakfast show in 1997.
  - 7 June – Scott Mills takes over as presenter of the drivetime show.
  - July – JK and Joel join.
  - 29 July – Annie Mac joins.
  - October – Carrie Davis joins and starts reading her first ever Newsbeat sports bulletins for The Chris Moyles Show.
  - 14 October – John Peel presents his final show on the station, before leaving for a working holiday in Peru. He dies eleven days later.
- 2005
  - 30 January – Wes Butters leaves the station as he presents his final The Official Chart show.
  - 5 February – Sara Cox returns from maternity leave to take over the Saturday and Sunday 1pm–4pm weekend lunchtime show.
  - 6 March – JK and Joel take over as presenters of The Official Chart.
  - Emma B leaves.
  - September – Reggie Yates and Fearne Cotton join and Nemone leaves the station to join Radio 6 Music.
  - 13 October – Radio 1 hosts the first John Peel Day, a year after he presented his final show for the station which was two weeks before his death.
  - November – Radio 1 Podcasts launches.
- 2006
  - 8 March – Radio 1 launches its YouTube channel.
  - August – Edith Bowman becomes the sole presenter of her own weekday lunchtime show.
  - 25 September – Colin Murray becomes the sole presenter of his own weekday late-night show.
- 2007
  - 1 June – Greg James and Chris Smith join.
  - 30 September – JK and Joel leave.
  - 14 October – Fearne Cotton and Reggie Yates take over as presenters of The Official Chart.
  - 18 December – Radio 1 is forced to backtrack on a decision to begin playing a censored version of The Pogues' 1987 Christmas hit "Fairytale of New York". The song which sees Kirsty MacColl and Shane MacGowan trading insults has the words "faggot" and "slut" edited out to "avoid offence", but after a day of criticism from listeners, the band and MacColl's mother, the decision is reversed and the original version is played in full.
  - BBC Introducing is launched, providing a vital platform for thousands of emerging musical talent. A decade later, over 460,000 tracks have been uploaded to the BBC Music Introducing website and 170,000 artists are registered.
  - Nick Grimshaw and Kissy Sell Out join.
- 2008
  - MistaJam joins.
  - 1 August – Dave Pearce leaves.
- 2009
  - 20 February – Radio 1's Minimix launches.
  - 18 September – Jo Whiley presents her final weekday mid-morning show and Edith Bowman also hosts her final weekday lunchtime show as they move to weekends.
  - 21 September – Fearne Cotton takes over the weekday mid-morning show and stops presenting The Official Chart and also Greg James takes over the weekday lunchtime show.
  - 27 September – Reggie Yates becomes the sole presenter of The Official Chart.
  - 24 December – Mark Chapman leaves the station after hosting his last Newsbeat sports bulletins to work for BBC Sport and ESPN.
  - Colin Murray, Steve Lamacq and Bobby Friction leave and Dev joins.

== 2010s ==
- 2010
  - 8 January – Matt Edmondson joins.
  - 12 February – Carrie Davis leaves the station after reading her last Newsbeat sports bulletins for The Chris Moyles Show, to work for BBC Sport.
  - 15 February – Tina Daheley joins the station and replaces Carrie Davis on Newsbeat sports bulletins for The Chris Moyles Show and later hosts news, sport and weather bulletins for the Radio 1 breakfast show with Nick Grimshaw from 24 September 2012.
  - 10 March – The Official Chart Update is launched to give a midweek insight into how the Official Singles Chart is shaping up. It is broadcast as a 30-minute mid-afternoon show on Wednesdays.
  - 31 May – Radio 1 teams up with forces broadcaster BFBS for a ten-hour takeover show from Camp Bastion, Afghanistan.
  - Mary Anne Hobbs leaves.
  - Bethan Elfyn leaves the station after 11 years of broadcasting to join BBC Radio Wales.
- 2011
  - 9 January – Tom Deacon joins.
  - 16–18 March – Chris Moyles breaks the record for presenting the longest radio show, after hosting a 52-hour live broadcast in aid of Red Nose Day 2011.
  - 27 March – Jo Whiley leaves the station after 17 years of broadcasting to join Radio 2.
  - 21 July – The BBC confirms that Andy Parfitt will step down as Controller of Radio 1 after 13 years to pursue other opportunities from the end of the month.
  - 31 July – Andy Parfitt leaves.
  - 28 October – Ben Cooper is appointed as Controller of Radio 1 and Radio 1Xtra, replacing Andy Parfitt who stepped down in July.
- 2012
  - 26 February – The Top Ten countdown from The Official Chart is made available in vision for the first time through the station's website.
  - 1 April – Tom Deacon leaves the station for a while and Edith Bowman hosts her final weekend breakfast show as she moves back to weekdays in March 2013 to replace Nihal on Tuesday nights.
  - 2 April – A shake-up of the schedule sees Scott Mills and Greg James swapping shows, James hosting the drivetime show and Mills the afternoon show. Also, major changes take place to the dance music schedule: Skream & Benga, Toddla T, Charlie Sloth and Friction take over from Judge Jules, Gilles Peterson, Kissy Sell Out and Fabio & Grooverider as Judge, Gilles, Kissy, and Fabio & Grooverider leave the station and also as Skream & Benga, Toddla, Charlie, and Friction join the station, resulting in a reshuffle of most late night shows from Monday to Saturday to incorporate the new line-up.
  - 8 April – Gemma Cairney joins the station, as she replaces Edith Bowman at weekends.
  - June – The regional new music shows are scrapped after thirteen years as a cost-cutting measure, and is replaced by BBC Introducing.
  - 20 June – The BBC Trust says that Radio 1's core audience is still too old, despite changes made to output following an amendment to the wording of its service licence in 2009. The station is aimed at the 15–29-year age group, but the average age of their listeners is 30.
  - 23–24 June – 100,000 people attend Radio 1's Hackney Weekend, a two-day music concert at Hackney Marshes which forms part of the build-up to the 2012 Summer Olympics.
  - 11 July – Chris Moyles announces that he will leave The Chris Moyles Show and the station on 14 September. It is confirmed that he will be succeeded by Nick Grimshaw on 24 September.
  - 14 September – Chris Moyles hosts his final show as he leaves the station after 15 years of broadcasting.
  - 24 September – Nick Grimshaw takes over The Radio 1 Breakfast Show.
  - 14 December – Radio 1 broadcasts its last show from Yalding House.
  - 22 December – Vernon Kay leaves.
  - 23 December – Reggie Yates leaves.
- 2013
  - January – A series of changes take place. Jameela Jamil is announced as the new presenter of The Official Chart, Matt Edmondson is to host a weekend morning show and Tom Deacon rejoins the station to present a Wednesday night show. YouTubers Dan Howell and Phil Lester also join the station.
  - 7 January – Alice Levine joins.
  - 13 January
    - Jameela Jamil joins and becomes the new presenter of The Official Chart.
    - Dan and Phil take over the Radio 1 Request Show.
  - 19 March – Nihal presents his final Radio 1's Review Tuesday night show.
  - 26 March – Edith Bowman returns to weekdays to replace Nihal on Radio 1's Review on Tuesday nights.
  - 3 April – Tom Deacon leaves the station after hosting his last Wednesday night show.
  - 12 April – Radio 1 controller Ben Cooper announces that the station's The Official Chart will not play "Ding-Dong! The Witch Is Dead", a song which charted following an internet campaign in the wake of the death of former Prime Minister Margaret Thatcher on 8 April. Instead, a portion of the song will air as part of a news item.
  - Trevor Nelson leaves the station to rejoin Radio 2 and Radio 1Xtra.
  - September – Tim Westwood leaves the station to rejoin Capital London.
- 2014
  - 17 February – Sara Cox hosts her last show for the station and leaves to rejoin Radio 2.
  - 7–8 March – Radio 1 marks International Women's Day with two nights of an all-female line-up from 7pm to 7am, featuring presenters including Annie Nightingale and Adele Roberts. The second night is also aired on Radio 1Xtra.
  - September – A series of changes sees many notable presenters leave the station, including Edith Bowman, Nihal and Rob da Bank. Huw Stephens gains a new show, hosting between 10pm and 1am Monday to Wednesday with Alice Levine, presenting weekends between 1pm and 4pm. Radio 1's Residency is also expanded with Skream joining the rotational line-up on Thursday nights between 10pm and 1am.
  - Rod McKenzie is dismissed following bullying allegations and is moved to another job outside the BBC.
- 2015
  - 25 January – Clara Amfo joins and takes over as presenter of The Official Chart.
  - 27 February – Fearne Cotton announces she is to leave the station to start "a new chapter".
  - 5 March – Zane Lowe presents his final show as he leaves the station.
  - 9 March – Annie Mac replaces Zane Lowe on weekday evenings.
  - 24 March – Radio 1 announces that The Official Chart will move from Sunday to Friday afternoon from mid-July in response to changes in the day new music is released.
  - 22 May – Fearne Cotton leaves.
  - 25 May – Clara Amfo replaces Fearne Cotton on weekday mid-mornings.
  - June – Schedule changes at Radio 1 and Radio 1Xtra see Adele Roberts presenting the Early Breakfast Show, replacing Gemma Cairney. Cairney has become the station's social action presenter, hosting The Surgery and documentaries for both networks as Aled Haydn Jones leaves the hosting and producing role to become Head of Programmes.
  - 5 July – The final Sunday broadcast of Radio 1's The Official Chart.
  - 10 July – The first Friday broadcast of Radio 1's The Official Chart. It is broadcast as part of the drivetime show, hosted by Greg James. Its airtime is almost halved, to just 1 hour 45 minutes with only the top 10 now being played in full.
- 2016
  - No events.
- 2017
  - 30 September – Radio 1 and Radio 2 celebrate their 50th birthday. Commemorations include a three-day pop-up station Radio 1 Vintage celebrating their presenters and special on-air shows on the day itself, including a special breakfast show co-presented by the station's launch DJ Tony Blackburn which is also broadcast on Radio 2.
  - 1 November – The Surgery is broadcast for the final time. It is replaced the following week by a new show called Radio 1's Life Hacks hosted by Cel Spellman, Katie Thistleton and Radha Modgil.
  - 6 November – Radio 1 has some schedule changes. A new weeknight show is launched, The 8th presented by Charlie Sloth broadcast on Radio 1 and its sister station Radio 1Xtra. Other changes involved Danny Howard, Katie Thistleton, Huw Stephens and Phil Taggart. Kan D Man, DJ Limelight and René LaVice join.
- 2018
  - 24 February – Radio 1 overhauls its weekend schedule. The changes see Maya Jama and Jordan North joining the station as weekend presenters, fronting the Greatest Hits show, while Matt Edmondson moves to present a weekday afternoon show on which he will be joined by a different guest co-presenter each week. Alice Levine moves from afternoons to weekend breakfasts to co-present with Dev.
  - 15 June
    - Radio 1 starts broadcasting much of its weekend schedule on Fridays meaning that the weekday daytime schedule is now only broadcast from Mondays to Thursdays.
    - Scott Mills replaces Greg James as host of The Official Chart.
  - 9 August – Nick Grimshaw presents The Radio 1 Breakfast Show for the final time.
  - 10 August – Chris Smith and Tina Daheley both leave the station after hosting their last Newsbeat bulletins.
  - 20 August – Greg James becomes the 16th person to present Radio 1 Breakfast.
  - 3 September – Nick Grimshaw takes over as host of the drivetime show. Jack Saunders hosts a new show called Radio 1's Indie Show.
  - 9 September – Huw Stephens' BBC Introducing show moves to Sunday nights as part of a shake-up of the Sunday schedule.
  - 3 October – Charlie Sloth announces he will leave Radio 1 and Radio 1Xtra after ten years of broadcasting.
  - 20 October – Having announced earlier in the month that he is leaving Radio 1 and Radio 1Xtra, Charlie Sloth now says this will happen with immediate effect. Previously, he has been scheduled to leave in November.
  - 26 October – Radio 1 announces a schedule change that will see Matt Edmondson and Mollie King co-presenting the Radio 1 Weekend Breakfast Show while Dev and Alice Levine will move to weekend afternoons.
  - November – Charlie Sloth leaves.
  - 15 November – Tiffany Calver replaces Charlie Sloth on the Rap Show as Tiffany herself joins the station.
  - 26 November – Former Kiss breakfast presenters Rickie Haywood-Williams, Melvin Odoom and Charlie Hedges join the station to replace Charlie Sloth on the evening show.
- 2019
  - 5 July – Friday's edition of Radio 1's Dance Anthems is relaunched as Radio 1's Party Anthems.
  - 14 July – The Official Chart: First Look is officially broadcast for the first time and is hosted by Cel Spellman and Katie Thistleton.
  - 6 September – The new early weekend breakfast show is running from Friday to Sunday and is presented by Arielle Free. Mollie King gained a new slot named Best New Pop.

== 2020s ==
- 2020
  - 27 February – Controller of BBC Sounds, Jonathan Wall, announces the launch of a new 24-hour 'Radio 1 Dance' stream on the service in the Spring.
  - 13 March – Radio 1's Big Weekend, scheduled for the Spring Bank Holiday Weekend was cancelled due to the COVID-19 pandemic.
  - 28 March – Radio 1 implements temporary changes to its schedule due to the COVID-19 pandemic. The changes see the length of shows across Radio 1 daytime increase, meaning fewer presenters are required in the studios throughout the course of the day.
  - 3 May – Maya Jama leaves.
  - 5 August – The station announces a major schedule overhaul which launches on 1 September. The new schedule sees Greg James move to a new time slot, 7am to 10:30am. Clara Amfo's show moves to 10:30am to 1pm, followed by Scott Mills from 1pm to 3:30pm and Nick Grimshaw from 3:30pm to 6pm. Radio 1's Future Sounds with Annie Mac moves forward an hour to a new 6pm to 8pm slot with the Hottest Record now at 6pm. This is followed by Rickie, Melvin & Charlie from 8pm to 10pm and Jack Saunders from 10pm to midnight.
  - 9 August – Alice Levine leaves.
  - 1 September – Radio 1's schedule returned to normal after it was modified in March, due to the COVID-19 pandemic.
  - 25 September – Toddla T hosted his last show after eleven years of broadcasting as he leaves the station.
  - 26 September – MistaJam leaves.
  - 2 October – Jeremiah Asiamah takes over Radio 1's Soundsystem, previously hosted by Toddla T.
  - 3 October – Charlie Hedges takes over Radio 1's Dance Anthems.
  - 9 October – BBC Radio 1 Dance launches on BBC Sounds.
  - 19 November – Radio 1 announces plans to play an edited version of the Christmas song "Fairytale of New York" by The Pogues and Kirsty MacColl over the Christmas period, because it feels its audience may be offended by some of its lyrics.
  - 20 December – Dev Griffin leaves the station after eighteen years of broadcasting to join Heart.
- 2021
  - 9 April – Following the death of Prince Philip, Duke of Edinburgh, regular programming is abandoned for the rest of the day, Radio 1 simulcasts the BBC Radio News special news programme until breaking away at 4pm for a special edition of Newsbeat and then plays appropriate music for the rest of the day. The Official Chart doesn't air for the second time since Princess Diana's death in 1997.
  - 20 April – Annie Mac announces that she will leave the station at the end of July. From September, Clara Amfo is to take over Radio 1's Future Sounds and Rickie, Melvin and Charlie will take over the weekday mid-morning show. Other changes include Radio 1's Future Artists with Jack Saunders moving to an earlier slot from 8pm to 10pm on Monday to Wednesday along with Radio 1's Indie Show on Thursdays. Radio 1's Power Down Playlist will become a standalone programme for the first time with Sian Eleri hosting from 10pm to 11pm from Monday to Wednesday. Danny Howard will take over as host of Radio 1's Dance Party on Fridays from 6pm to 8pm and Jaguar will host Radio 1 Dance Introducing on Thursdays from 10pm to 11pm. New presenter Sarah Story will join the station to host Radio 1's Future Dance on Fridays from 8pm to 10pm.
  - 22 April – BBC Radio 1 Relax launches exclusively on BBC Sounds with little notice. The stream aims to play a selection of well-being focussed music content throughout the day and ASMR and relaxing sounds throughout the night.
  - 30 June – During his drivetime show, Nick Grimshaw announces he will leave the station after fourteen years in mid-August. From 6 September, Vick Hope and Jordan North will host a new drivetime show together from Monday to Thursday from 3:30pm to 6pm. Dean McCullough will also permanently join Radio 1 to replace Jordan North's weekend show from Friday to Sunday from 10:30am to 1pm. The first show will air 10 September and will be broadcast from Salford, the first daytime Radio 1 programme to move out of London as part of the BBC's Across The UK plans. Victoria Jane will also join the station to launch a new show, Radio 1 Future Soul, broadcast from Salford.
  - 30 July – Annie Mac presents her final show as she leaves the station after seventeen years of broadcasting.
  - 5 August – Clara Amfo presents her final weekday mid-morning show.
  - 12 August – Nick Grimshaw presents his final show as he leaves the station after fourteen years of broadcasting.
  - 9 September – BBC Introducing on Radio 1 Dance is broadcast for the first time as Jaguar joins the station.
  - 10 September – Danny Howard replaces Annie Mac on Friday evenings and Radio 1's Future Dance broadcasts for the first time as Sarah Story joins the station.
  - 11 September – Dean McCullough joins the station and replaces Jordan North at weekends.
  - 13 September – Radio 1's Future Soul is broadcast for the first time as Victoria Jane joins the station.
  - 16 October – Radio 1's Out Out! Live, a music concert to celebrate the return of the night out, will be held at the SSE Arena in Wembley, London.
- 2022
  - 8 March – It is announced that Mollie King will present a new show, Radio 1's Future Pop on Thursdays from 8pm to 10pm. Monday nights will be dedicated to Rock and Alternative, with the Radio 1 Rock Show with Daniel P Carter moving to 11pm to 1am. Alyx Holcombe will join the station to present Radio 1 Introducing Rock from 1am to 2am following the Radio 1 Rock Show and Nels Hylton will present Radio 1's Future Alternative. Radio 1's Drum & Bass Show will move to Saturday nights from 11pm with Charlie Tee as René LaVice leaves the station. Radio 1's Indie Show with Jack Saunders moves to Sundays at 9pm and Radio 1's Soundsystem with Jeremiah Asiamah moves to Saturdays at 7pm. The 1Xtra Takeover with DJ Target will no longer air on Radio 1.
  - 17 May – Radio 1 launches the Presenter Uploader tool to enable potential new presenters to upload their demo tapes to its server. The software is also made available to the entire radio industry.
  - 1 July – It is announced that Scott Mills and Chris Stark will leave the station at the end of August.
  - 5 July – Dean McCullough and Vicky Hawkesworth are announced as the new hosts of Radio 1's afternoon show from 1pm to 3:30pm from Monday 5 September. In addition, Katie Thistleton is announced to be taking over the Friday and Saturday editions of McCullough's weekend show, with Nat presenting Radio 1's 00's in the Sunday edition's slot.
  - 28 July – Jack Saunders is announced as the new host of The Official Chart on Radio 1, starting on 9 September.
  - 5 August – Roisin Hastie announces she will be leaving Newsbeat and ending her contributions to Radio 1 Breakfast with Greg James.
  - 15 August – Calum Leslie is announced as the new Breakfast newsreader for Newsbeat.
  - 14 October – Radio 1 hosts Europe's Biggest Dance Show 2022 with eleven radio stations from across Europe joining to showcase the best of dance music and Ukraine's Radio Promin joining for the first time.
  - 28 October – Jamie Laing joins Matt Edmondson to co-present weekend afternoons on Radio 1, covering for Mollie King while she is on maternity leave.
  - 25 December – Radio 1 presents a Christmas Day TikTok Takeover between 2pm and 6pm, with ten presenters from the social media platform presenting 30 minute slots.
- 2023
  - 21 June – Adele Roberts and Gemma Bradley announce they are leaving Radio 1, Sam & Danni will replace Roberts, while Jess Iszatt replacing Bradley.
  - 3 July – Radio 1 introduces a Summer schedule that sees its flagship Radio 1 Breakfast with Greg James start and finish 30 minutes later, from 7:30am to 11am.
  - 31 July – Arielle Free is suspended while an on-air disagreement with Charlie Hedges over her choice of music is investigated.
  - 19 December – Annie Nightingale presents her final show before her death the following month.
- 2024
  - 7 February – The BBC announces plans to launch a new Radio 1 spin-off station on DAB and online via BBC Sounds. The station will focus on music from the 2000s and 2010s. The plans, which will see four new stations launch, include Radio 1 Dance start broadcasting on DAB+ as an expanded service with new and enhanced content.
  - 16 February – The BBC announces that Jordan North will leave Radio 1, with Jamie Laing being announced as the new drivetime presenter alongside Vick Hope.
  - 14 March – Chris Sawyer, co-producer of the Radio 1 Breakfast Show, announces he is leaving his role after fifteen years.
  - 24 July – Radio 1 Relax closes after 3 years of broadcasting.
  - 8 November – Radio 1 Anthems launches on BBC Sounds, joining an enhanced Radio 1 Dance which commenced earlier in the year.
- 2025
  - 2 July – Ofcom gives a final approval of the BBC's plans for three new DAB+ stations, two of which are Radio 1 spin-offs. The stations - Radio 1 Dance and Radio 1 Anthems - will launch on DAB+ and online via BBC Sounds, as it concluded they offer plenty amount of public value to justify their limited impact on commercial radio services.
  - 11 September – Radio 1 Dance and Radio 1 Anthems launch on DAB+.
- 2026
  - 18 February – The Prince of Wales joins an edition of Life Hacks for a discussion on mental health and male suicide.
  - 15 July – Radio 1 announces that Rickie Haywood-Williams and Melvin Odoom will both leave the station after 7 years, with Jeremiah Asiamah replacing them on the mid-morning Live Lounge slot from September. Other changes include Charley Marlowe co-hosting Radio 1's Group Chat from Fridays to Sundays with Vicky Hawkesworth, replacing Nat O'Leary, and The Official Chart: First Look becoming a stand-alone programme on Sundays, hosted by Lauren Layfield live from Birmingham. Danny Mylo and Rosie Madison will take over the early breakfast show from Dean McCullough, Emil Franchi will replace James Cusack on weekend breakfast and GK Barry will join to present a series of Radio 1 shows. Radio 1's Life Hacks will be co-hosted by Shanequa Paris and Ore Olukoga on Sunday evenings. The station's weekend early breakfast show will be presented by rising radio DJs as Swarzy leaves the station.
