= Derek Chinnery =

Charles Derek Chinnery (27 April 1925 – 22 March 2015) was the controller of BBC Radio 1 from 1978 to 1985.

== Early life and career ==
Chinnery was born in Richmond, London, and attended Gosforth Grammar School. He joined the BBC in 1941 aged 16. From 1943 to 1947 he was in the RAF. He returned to the BBC in 1947, becoming a producer in 1952.

== BBC Radio 1 controller ==
He took over from Charles McLelland and was succeeded by Johnny Beerling. He relaxed the guidelines on banning records, allowing records to mention a commercial product, and ended the Sounds of the Seventies programme.

Chinnery admitted that while he was controller he confronted Jimmy Savile over allegations of inappropriate sexual activities, which Savile denied; Chinnery said "there was no reason to disbelieve" him. Chinnery took no further action, saying: "He was the sort of man that attracted rumours, after all, because he was single, he was always on the move, he was always going around the country."

== Personal life ==
Chinnery married Doreen Clarke in 1953 in Marylebone.

Media offices
Preceded by Charles McLelland	Controller of Radio 1; 1978 – 1985	Succeeded by Johnny Beerling
