= Martyn Lee (broadcaster) =

British DJ (born 1978)

Martyn Lee (born 22 July 1978) is a British national radio broadcaster, Sony award-winning radio producer, Neuro-linguistic programming (NLP) Master Practitioner and Hypnotist. He was a presenter on Absolute 80s from 2010 to 2019.

He has been Programme Director for radio stations on the south coast of England including 2CR FM, Original 106 and The Coast 106. Lee also works with Bournemouth University with their media and radio courses.

== Early career ==
He grew up in Norfolk and Suffolk where his career started at LTR FM, which is now known as The Beach. He worked at Radio Broadland from 1994 to 1996 as the weekend sports producer.

== 2CR FM ==
In October 1996 he joined 2CR FM working on the breakfast show for the presenter 'Lloydie'. He went from being a producer to presenter on Boxing Day 1997 and subsequently went on to host the evening show, breakfast show and drivetime show. Whilst as 2CR FM he was also Head of Music and Assistant Programme Controller. He left in June 2006 having spent 10 years there presenting many shows including the Breakfast Show, Drivetime, Daytimes and 'The Hot 30 Countdown'

== GWR Group and GCap Media ==
Whilst at 2CR FM in Bournemouth, Martyn was part of the music scheduling team for the parent companies, GWR and GCap Media responsible for choosing the playlists of over 30 radio stations.

== Original 106 and The Coast 106 ==
He joined Original 106 in July 2006 as Assistant Programme Director and host of the Saturday Breakfast show. For much of 2007 he was the host of the weekday afternoon show. In early 2008, with the arrival of Richard Skinner, he no longer presented a weekday programme and became Programme Director, whilst retaining his own show on Saturday evenings 6pm-midnight.

When Original 106 was bought by Celador in August 2008, Martyn was employed as Programme Director to launch The Coast 106, which went on air on 30 October 2008 with a line-up that included Matt Hopper, Iain Meadows and John Clayton.

== Absolute Radio ==
On Monday 5 October 2009 he moved to Absolute Radio to produce The Christian O'Connell Breakfast Show weekday mornings from 6am-10am. In 2010 he produced a Sony Radio Award Winning promotion called 'One Last Dream'.

In November 2010 he moved from the breakfast show to present daily shows on the national digital radio stations operated by Absolute Radio, including Absolute 80s with holiday cover on Absolute Radio.

In May 2015, Lee began presenting The Absolute 80s Chart, which airs every Sunday and looks at two different charts of two years of the 80s. In 2019, Lee announced that he would be leaving Absolute 80s and would be replaced by Sarah Champion. Lee presented his final show on Absolute 80s on 3 March 2019.

== NLP and hypnotism ==
Martyn often talks about his experiences as a hypnotist live on the air. According to his website he also works with companies, particularly in the radio industry such as GCap Media, as a communications and language consultant. He also works with the Radio Academy to educate student broadcasters.

== Personal and family ==
Lee comes from Lowestoft and attended Bournemouth University from 1996 to 1999. He is married with a son and they live in Dorset. He often posts on Twitter under the username martlee.

Martin Lee has shown support EV and sustainable power, owning and driving electric vehicles for many years and presenting the EV News Daily Podcast.
