= Original 106 (Solent) =

- England
- Broadcast area: Dorset, Hampshire, Isle of Wight and West Sussex
- Frequencies: 106.0 MHz and 106.6 MHz FM

Programming
- Format: Adult Album Alternative

Ownership
- Owner: Celador Radio Broadcasting

History
- First air date: 1 October 2006
- Last air date: 30 September 2008

Links
- Website: www.original106.com

Original 106fm was an Independent Local Radio station broadcasting to the Solent region of southern England, centred on the towns and cities of Portsmouth, Southampton and Bournemouth, from its transmitters at Chillerton Down, Mannings Heath (Poole) and Crabwood Farm (Winchester). It was awarded its broadcast licence in September 2005 and launched on 1 October 2006 and ceased broadcasting on 30 September 2008.

The station broadcast an Adult Alternative format, with only 35% of its music coming from past or present Top 20 charts.

Original 106fm was notable for holding the first United Kingdom broadcast licence to be awarded to an overseas group when Canwest won the licence in 2005. They sold it to Celador Radio Broadcasting in August 2008.

The station ceased broadcasting on 30 September 2008 and was replaced by Celador's new station The Coast.

== Original 106 music ==
Original 106 played a mix of hit singles and album tracks from a full range of adult-oriented genres including rock, pop, soul, R & B, blues, mellow and adult eclectic from the 1960s to the present day. Specialist music programmes complemented the main music mix, in the form of themed night-time shows each week night and "The Original Showcase" presented by Xan Phillips, a locally focused arts, music and entertainment show on Sunday evenings featuring new music, local bands, theatre, comedy, interviews, discussions etc. Richard Skinner presented the Original 106 Album Chart on Sunday afternoons. Original 106 played music by local bands and artists and in 2008 the station sponsored The Mag Awards, a music awards ceremony presented by The Mag.

== News, sport, traffic and information ==
Original 106 broadcast local news bulletins 24 hours a day. Alan Jennings was the News Editor. Journalists included Jalminder Sandhu, Simon Vincent and Clare Sowerbutts.

Regular "What's On" and entertainment guides were broadcast daily, complete with information features focused on life across the south coast of England.

== Presenters ==
- Tommy Boyd
- Richard Skinner
- Chris Wright
- Pat Sissons
- Xan Phillips
- Tim Butcher
- Matt Hopper
- Rosalie Lamming
- Adrian Scott
- Martyn Lee

== Audience figures ==
In the period from January 2008 to June 2008 (RAJAR Q208), Original 106 reported 127,000 listeners over a 13-week period, and 45,000 people every single week.

== Management ==
- Managing Director: Kevin Stewart
- Programme Director: Martyn Lee
- News Editor: Alan Jennings

== Licence breach and lifting ==
On 8 October 2007 OFCOM found Original 106 in breach of its licence.

"This Spot Sampling report was triggered following complaints received by Ofcom that Original 106, the "Adult Alternative" station for the Solent region, is not delivering the music policy set out in its Format.

After carrying out a detailed analysis of the music logs from three days of Original’s output, we found that the station, which its Format states is "an album-led music service", was clearly exceeding the percentage of Top 20 hit singles that its Format permits it to play, and particularly during daytime hours. We concluded from our analysis that an unacceptably high number of the music tracks being aired by Original were mainstream pop records that do not sit happily with the station’s "Adult Alternative" remit, and were therefore out-of-Format.

Original 106 is not operating within its Format and a Yellow Card warning has been issued."

On 29 February 2008 Original 106 was sampled again by OFCOM on Wednesday 30 January, Thursday 31 January and Friday 1 February 2008. OFCOM concluded:

"At the end of January 2008, we carried out a second three-day analysis of Original’s output, and found that, across a 24-hour period, the station was now within its permitted percentage of Top 20 hit singles. There was also a considerable reduction in the number of tracks that could not comfortably be described as "Adult Alternative". The station was within its Format in other aspects of its music policy. The station was also compliant with its Format regarding news and speech output, which included a high percentage of speech at breakfast, along with interviews and features, and two extended news bulletins. We concluded that Original 106 is now operating within its Format, and the Yellow Card issued in October 2007 therefore has been lifted."
