= Radio 1 Roadshow =

British radio broadcast (1973–1999)

The Radio 1 Roadshow was an annual summer event hosted and broadcast by BBC Radio 1 from 1973 to 1999. The roadshow ran over three decades of live broadcasts from beach resorts around the UK. The summer roadshows came to an end in July and August 1999, when the BBC replaced them with a series of one-day pop festivals in cities around the UK.

== History ==
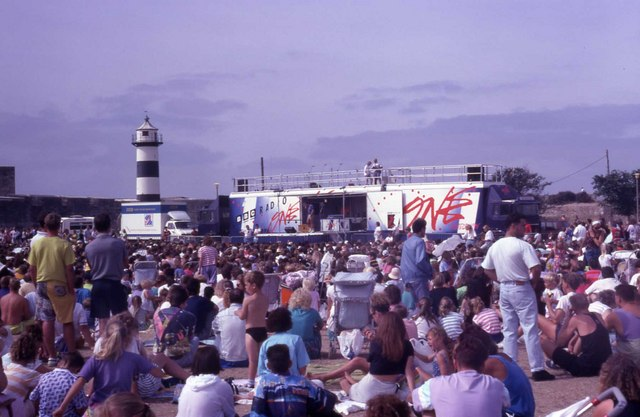
Roadshow at Southsea, August 1990

The concept for the Roadshow came from Radio 1 producer and later controller Johnny Beerling; it was envisaged and purchased by Tony Miles, built and maintained by John Dean, with engineers Peter Lucken and Johnny Heritage. The first Roadshow was held at North Fistral Beach, Newquay, Cornwall, on Monday 26 July 1973, and was hosted by Alan Freeman.

Various disc jockeys from the station would visit British towns, usually on the coast, to play a live set, meet local people to play their requests, take part in games and give away goodie bags of Radio 1 gifts. Accompanying the DJs were the support crew, led by Tony Miles, nicknamed "Smiley Miley", who had provided the original caravan for the first Roadshow.

Several games were devised especially for participation in by the live audience. Most notable were two that ran throughout the Roadshow's history, Bits and Pieces and Smiley Miley's Mileage Game. In Bits and Pieces, four contestants selected from the Roadshow crowd had to name a series of pop hits after hearing a tape containing ten brief excerpts; the winner was the one who accurately identified the most songs and artists. In The Mileage Game, three contestants had to guess how many miles the Roadshow truck had travelled from the previous venue, after hearing the route from Smiley Miley, with the winner being the one making the most accurate guess.

The typical roadshow summer season started in July and ran for eight weeks, broadcasting live on Radio 1 from the roadshow locations from 11 am to 12.30 pm each weekday. The first hour from 10 am was a warm-up ahead of the 11 am start of the live broadcast. By the late 1970s, they had become a key part of the summer schedules for Radio 1 and attracted much support during their run.

The largest attendance was at Sutton Park, Birmingham, on Sunday 30 August 1992, when 100,000 fans turned up to celebrate the 25th anniversary of Radio 1 with live performances from bands including Del Amitri, Aswad, The Farm and Status Quo.

In the early 1990s, several attempts were made to modernise the Roadshow. Under Matthew Bannister, for example, in 1993 and 1994, the station commissioned an independent production company to make an audio postcard for each venue in advance of the Roadshow's arrival in that place. Thirty-six whistle-stop 2 Minute Tours were made each year; they were broadcast several times in the 24 hours leading up to the Roadshow proper, in order to give a wider reflection of life in each place.

By the mid-1990s, the Roadshow had expanded to 54 live dates over nine weeks. Two trucks reversed back-to-back to form a 75-foot stage front. Chris Hopkins was one of the last warm-up DJs on the roadshows, replacing Smiley Miley.

A memorable Roadshow would occur in July 1996. DJ Chris Evans had for a number of weeks mocked the little known town of Driffield, East Yorkshire. In response to the reaction from local listeners, the Roadshow came to the town, broadcasting from the showground and to a huge crowd.

== Demise ==
The final old-style Roadshow was held at Marine Parade, Brighton, with Chris Moyles on 27 August 1999. As part of reforms to the station, the Radio 1 Roadshow was axed in favour of a series of one-day pop concerts, called One Big Sunday. These have since been replaced by a single three-day event called BBC Radio 1's Big Weekend. The style of the event is more akin to a standalone music festival than the broadcasting-based shows of old. The emphasis is on current artists and new music.

The BBC released an archive of Roadshow clips in December 2018, and broadcast a 50 Years of the Roadshow programme in September 2023.

== Roadshow vehicles ==
There were four Roadshow vehicles over the history of the programme:

- Mark I (1974–1975) – This was essentially a caravan with a drop-down stage.
- Mark II (1976–1981) – This was the first articulated, trailer-mounted vehicle, with a fold-down stage and two off-stage areas for technical gear and hospitality. At the end of its Radio 1 life, it became the Delivery Van for Saturday Superstore on BBC TV, acting essentially as a Roadshow style element for the Saturday-morning children's show.
- Mark III (1982–1989) – As the popularity of the Roadshow increased, a new articulated trailer with a higher and larger stage, plus roof area, was procured by Radio 1. This also offered a larger audio control room and office space for the production team. When it was withdrawn from Radio 1 use, it was re-branded and used by Radio 2, before being sold by the BBC.

Up until 1989 support vehicles were being used in the form of 7.5 & 12.5 ton trucks; these carried most of the audio equipment, which by this date had grown to massive proportions. These trucks were multipurpose vehicles that could themselves be folded out into separate stage areas, as well as host the crew – John Dean, Peter Lucken and "Froggy" John Heritage – who provided the engineering and sound system for the Roadshow up until the BBC took over. Two of these trucks are owned by PLRS Sound System & Stage Hire and are still hired out as stage units and as PA system haulage vehicles on a regular basis

- Mark IV (1990–1999) – At the start of the 1990s, a new Roadshow facility was required, with the ability to cater for further live performances and bigger crowds. The new facility consisted of a main vehicle with the core audio facilities and stage, plus a second vehicle that backed up onto the main vehicle, providing office and green room facilities for guests. Special PA lifts were installed to allow the speakers for the PA system to be easily lifted up to the roof. In 2003 it was purchased by Totally Sound Ltd. On the eve of the 45th anniversary of the very first roadshow, Tony Miles announced that he had purchased both Mark IV units and would be fully restoring them.
