= David Beerling =

British professor of natural sciences

David Beerling FRS
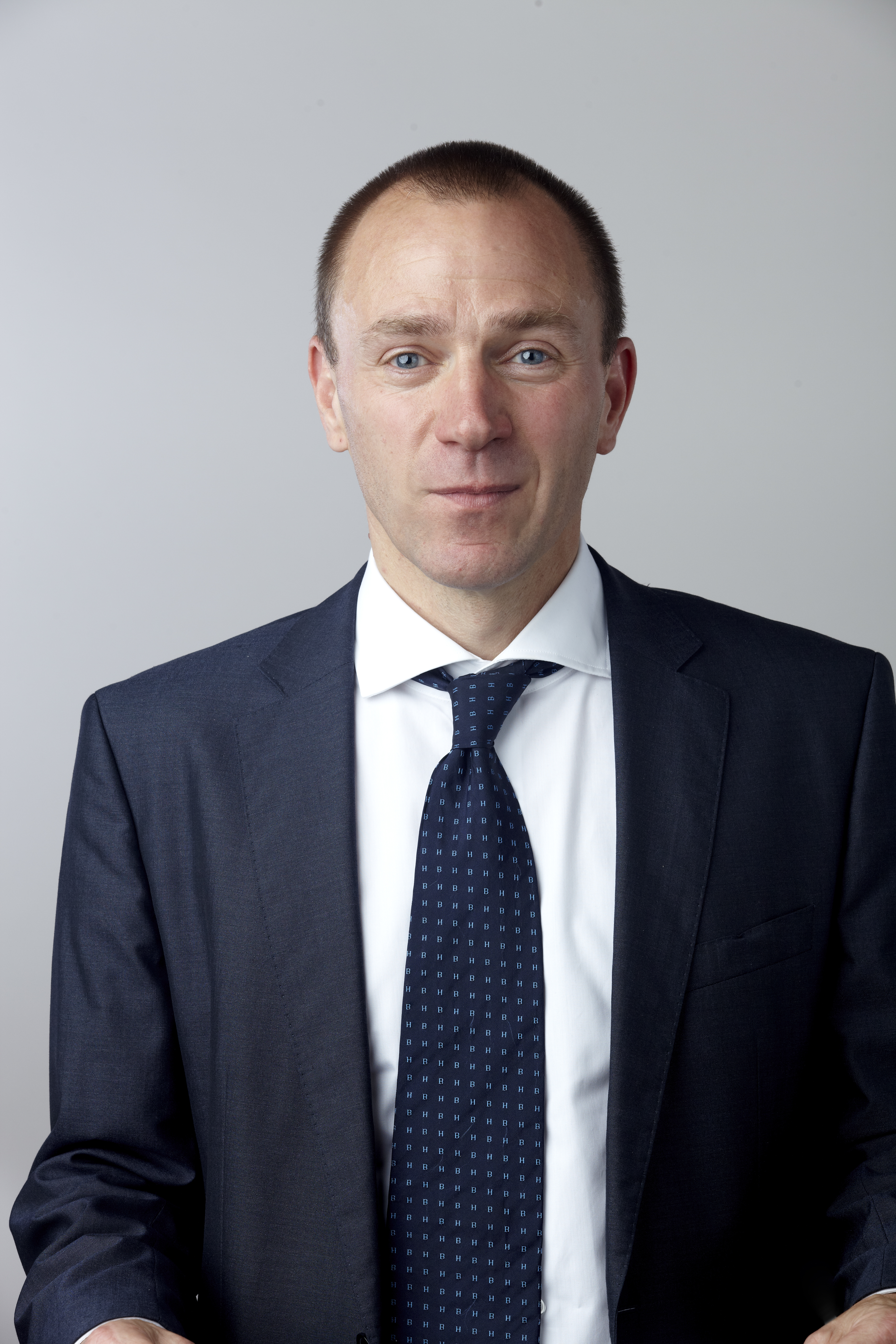
- David Beerling at the Royal Society admissions day in 2014
- Born: David John Beerling; June 21, 1965 (age 61); Tunbridge Wells
- Education: University of Wales, College of Cardiff (BSc, PhD)
- Known for: The Emerald Planet
- Spouse: Juliette Dawn Fraser (m. 2011)
- Children: Joshua
- Awards: Philip Leverhulme Prize (2001); European Research Council Advanced Grant (2010); Leverhulme Research Centre Award (2015)
- Scientific career
- Fields: Plant evolution; Geobiology; Global change
- Workplaces: University of Sheffield; University of London; Durham University
- Thesis: The ecology and control of Japanese knotweed (Reynoutria japonica Houtt.) and Himalayan balsam (Impatiens glandulifera Royle.) on river banks in South Wales (1990)
- Doctoral advisor: Ron Walter Edwards
- Website: www.sheffield.ac.uk/aps/staff-and-students/acadstaff/beerling

David John Beerling FRS FLSW (born 21 June 1965) is the Director of the Leverhulme Centre for Climate change mitigation and Sorby Professor of Natural Sciences in the Department of Animal and Plant Sciences (APS) at the University of Sheffield, UK. He is also Editor-in-Chief of the Royal Society journal Biology Letters.

== Education ==
Beerling was educated at University of Wales, College of Cardiff where he was awarded a Bachelor of Science degree in Botany in 1987 followed by a PhD in 1990 for research into the biogeography, ecology and control of two important and highly invasive alien plant species Japanese knotweed Reynoutria japonica and Himalayan balsam Impatiens glandulifera. His PhD was supervised by Ron Walter Edwards CBE and he authored two ecological monographs on the species and scientific papers reporting simulated projections of their potential future distributions in Europe with global climate change. Beerling then undertook a postdoctoral position working on palaeobotany with William Chaloner at the University of London (Royal Holloway College, UK).

== Research and career ==
Beerling's research group investigate fundamental questions concerning the conquest of the land by plants and the role of terrestrial ecosystems in shaping Earth's global ecology, climate and atmospheric composition. This is achieved by approaches that integrate evidence from fossils, experiments and theoretical models applied across spatial and temporal scales. Increasingly, his group's research discoveries are informing our understanding of current global climate change issues.

=== Earth's atmospheric carbon dioxide history ===
An important early success of his biophysical approach to palaeobotany was the discovery of evidence for a substantial increase in the atmospheric CO_{2} concentration and 'super-greenhouse' conditions across the Triassic-Jurassic (Tr-J) boundary, 200 million years ago, based on analyses of fossil stomata and leaf morphology from Greenland. This causally linked a catastrophic extinction event with the break-up of Pangaea. Before his group's work, the Tr-J extinction represented one of the most poorly understood of the so-called 'big-five' mass extinctions in the Phanerozoic (past 540 million years). His paper resulted in major new international research programmes that subsequently identified evidence confirming the carbon cycle perturbation in marine and terrestrial sediments world-wide. He extended this discovery by evaluating hypothesized causal mechanisms with numerical geochemical carbon cycle modelling in collaboration with the Yale University geochemist Robert Berner.

Beerling was the only UK participant in an international consortium led by James Hansen (former Director of the Goddard Institute for Space Studies) analysing Cenozoic CO_{2} and palaeoclimate evidence to investigate the broader societal question of the target CO_{2} level required to avoid 'dangerous' anthropogenic interference of the climate system. Stabilization of human-made greenhouse gases in the atmosphere at a level avoiding this concern is a core objective of the United Nations Framework Convention on Climate Change. The resulting 2008 'Target CO_{2}' paper made the front page of the UK newspaper The Guardian which commented:

"World's leading climate scientists warn today that the EU and its international partners must urgently rethink targets for cutting carbon dioxide in the atmosphere because of fears they have grossly underestimated the scale of the problem"

=== Fossils and experimental palaeobiology ===
Beerling is a leading architect in the field of experimental palaeobiology, adopting advanced experimental research programmes to address fundamental questions raised by the fossil record of plant life. Characterized by the formulation and evaluation of rigorous hypotheses, these programmes demonstrate how experimental evidence serves to deepen our causal understanding of past events. By productively collaborating with Jonathan Leake, his group established essential missing functional evidence supporting the long-standing conjecture, based largely on 400-million-year-old-fossils from the Devonian Rhynie chert, that the establishment of rootless early land plants in skeletal soils was promoted by their mutualistic symbiotic partnership with soil fungi. They went on to reveal how the simulated high CO_{2} Palaeozoic atmosphere and arbuscular mycorrhizal fungi synergistically enhanced plant fitness to create uniquely strong selection pressures favouring the establishment of mycorrhiza-like partnerships in 'lower' land plants. These findings now place fungi as key players in the earliest symbiotic events during the greening of the Earth's land-masses.

Beerling's investigations into vegetation interactions with past environments extend to those guided by the fossil remains of ancient polar forests. Through a creative combination of experiments simulating high CO_{2} ancient polar environments, and modelling of forest biogeochemistry, his group's analyses helped define our modern understanding of the physiological ecology of Mesozoic high-latitude forests [ref]. In doing so, they overturned 'textbook dogma' concerning the adaptive significance of polar forest deciduousness, established following Scott of the Antarctic's discovery of Glossopteris fossils on the Beardmore Glacier at 82ºS in 1912. BBC News covered these findings in a 2003 report 'Antarctic Scott's lasting legacy' and again in a 2011 report entitled 'Secrets of Antarctica's fossilised forests'.

Beerling's has published over 200 papers in leading peer reviewed scientific journals including Science and Nature.

=== Popular Science ===
Beerling's best-selling popular science book The Emerald Planet: How plants changed Earth's history presents a case for recognising the role of plants in shaping Earth's history. Reviewed in many journals (e.g. Nature) and newspapers, including The Times and The Guardian, the book was named by Oliver Sacks as his favourite non-fiction book of the year in The Observer. Sacks wrote of it

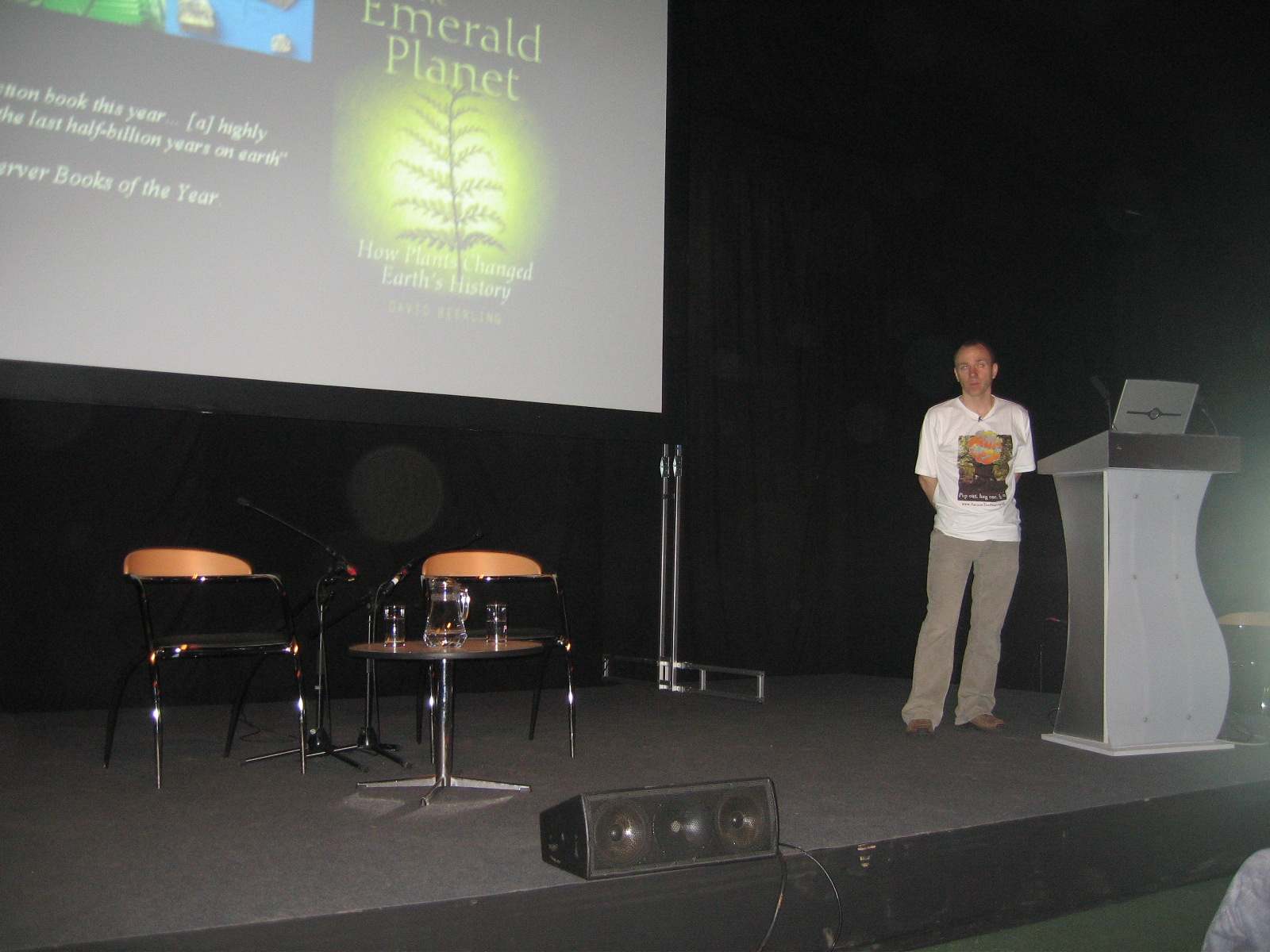
Beerling promoting The Emerald Planet at the Hay Festival of Literature and Arts

The story Beerling tells could not have been put together even 10 years ago, for it depends on the latest insights from palaeontology, climate science, genetics, molecular biology and chemistry, all brilliantly and beautifully integrated.

The Emerald Planet has been translated into three languages and attracted public acclaim and that of his academic peers. The book formed the basis of a major three-part BBC Two television series, How to Grow a Planet, for which Beerling acted as the Scientific Consultant. Enhanced public awareness of plant science followed, with the series attracting average viewing figures of 1.7 million per episode. The book was reprinted by Oxford University Press in 2009 with a foreword written by Iain Stewart, the presenter of How to Grow a Planet. Beerling is also the author of an advanced technical book Vegetation and the terrestrial carbon cycle: the first 400 million years.

=== History of Science ===
Beerling is interested in the history of science and publishes occasional scholarly articles on this theme. These have included an invited commentary entitled 'Gas valves, forests and global change: a commentary on Paul Gordon Jarvis classic 1976 paper written to celebrate the 350th anniversary of the journal Philosophical Transactions of the Royal Society, and the discovery that Isaac Newton's interest in botany extended to thinking about how water moves from roots to leaves and into the atmosphere over 200 years before botanists got round to explaining it. His discovery was widely reported including in Scientific American and Science which coined the memorable 'Newton was no sap' strap line. In 2010, he wrote a piece for Nature discussing theoretical analyses revealing how plant investment in the architecture of leaf veins can be shuffled for different conditions, minimising the construction costs associated with supplying water to leaves. He placed these findings in the context of the pioneering English plant physiologist Stephen Hales's book Vegetable Staticks published in 1727. Hales observed that plants lose water by "perspiration" and then went one better by conducting experiments to quantify the process.

=== Funding ===
Beerling's research has been funded by the Natural Environment Research Council (NERC), the Department for International Development (DFID), the Economic and Social Research Council (ESRC), The Royal Society, and The Leverhulme Trust. In 2012 he was awarded a prestigious European Research Council Advanced Investigator Grant to research 'Carbon dioxide regulation of Earth's ecological weathering engine: from microorganisms to ecosystems'.

In 2015, he was awarded £10 million for establishing a Leverhulme Centre for Climate change mitigation which hopes to revolutionise approaches to climate change mitigation and transform the evidence base needed to alter land management options for mitigating climate change and promoting food security, whilst safeguarding natural resources. The vision is to develop and assess the role of enhanced rock weathering as a means of safely removing large amounts of the greenhouse gas carbon dioxide (CO_{2}) from the atmosphere to cool the planet, while also mitigating ocean acidification.

As of 2015 the plan is to deliver these aims through Earth system modelling, lab-based controlled environment experimental investigations and large-scale field studies, embedded with social science analyses of sustainability and public engagement. Beerling, Director of the Leverhulme Centre for Climate Change Mitigation at the University of Sheffield, said:

I am delighted that the Leverhulme Trust is providing substantial long-term investment in our pioneering Leverhulme Centre at the University of Sheffield. It couldn't be more timely and represents a huge vote of confidence for the outstanding team of scientists and social scientists involved from Sheffield and elsewhere.

Beerling added:

The ambition of our new interdisciplinary Leverhulme Centre is to deliver a step-change in the development of feasible, scalable, atmospheric CO_{2} removal options and avert ocean acidification. We will objectively develop the science, sustainability and ethics necessary for harnessing the photosynthate energy of plants to accelerate the breakdown of silicate rocks applied to agroecosystems and ultimately sequester carbon on the sea floor. In effect, the approach uses natural reactions that have been stabilising climate for millions of years to safely remove the greenhouse gas carbon dioxide from the atmosphere."

On 29 November 2018, the BBC's Science Editor, David Shukman, reported on progress of the Centre on the National BBC news and in an accompanying BBC New online article entitled Climate change: Can 12 billion tonnes of carbon be sucked from the air?

=== Awards and honours ===
Beerling was awarded a Philip Leverhulme Prize in Earth sciences for outstanding contributions to palaeobotany and palaeoclimatology in 2001. He was elected the 2008/9 Edward P Bass Distinguished Visiting Environmental Scholar at the Yale Institute for Biosphere Science, Yale University. The Edward P. Bass Distinguished Visiting Environmental Scholars Program was created in July 2002 with a private donation by Edward P. Bass to the Yale Institute for Biospheric Studies (YIBS), which he also established in 1991 with a gift to Yale University. In 2009, Beerling was awarded a Royal Society Wolfson Research Merit Award (2009–2014), a scheme funded by the Wolfson Foundation and Department for Business, Innovation and Skills for recruiting or retaining respected scientists of outstanding achievement and potential to the UK. Beerling was elected a Fellow of the Royal Society (FRS) in 2014, his certificate of election reads:

David Beerling is one of the world's leading botanists widely respected internationally for his major contributions to understanding the co-evolution of plants and the environment over the past half billion years. He is distinguished for pioneering cross-disciplinary research programmes that combine palaeobotanical, experimental and theoretical modelling approaches. His research demonstrates how experimental and fossil evidence can be blended to enhance our understanding of plant evolution and its feedbacks on past environments. His integration of ecosystem processes into a broad geosciences framework established the importance of the terrestrial biosphere in Earth's climate history.

Beerling was elected a Fellow of the Learned Society of Wales in 2022.

Beerling's life and career have been profiled in Steel Science, the online magazine of Science Communication at the University of Sheffield.

== Personal life ==
Beerling is the son of Johnny Beerling former Controller of BBC Radio 1 and Carol Ann Beerling. Beerling married Juliette Fraser in 2011, they have one son Joshua.
