= Radio 1 Podcasts =

Podcasts released by BBC Radio 1

BBC Radio 1 regularly releases six podcasts. The selection has grown over time, originally forming part of the BBC's podcast trial. In November 2005, short clips (typically 30 seconds) of commercially available music began to be used within some shows, after the BBC negotiated a deal with rights holders.

== Current podcasts ==
=== Radio 1's Minimix ===
Lasts only five minutes, however the time for the podcast was more than doubled when it was released on 20 February 2009. Occasionally, it is increased if there are more mini mixes. Contains mini mixes, which is a mix of many tracks made for Danny Howard's show, broadcast on Friday evenings.

=== Radio 1's All Day Breakfast with Greg James ===
Released every weekday, this podcast started after Greg James moved slot to host The Radio 1 Breakfast Show, which contains the best bits of the breakfast show.

=== Radio 1's Screen Time ===
Released every Friday, presented by Ali Plumb from BBC Radio 1. The Podcast includes film interviews from radio 1 and reviews with Greg James and Trevor Nelson.

=== Newsbeat ===
Five episodes about the story of Izzy Dix recorded in late 2015.

=== Life and Death Row ===
A series from Radio 1 and BBC Three about one of the episodes of the BBC series presented by Greg James.

=== At Home with Vick & Jordan ===
Updated weekly. A show which shows the best bits of Going Home with Vick & Jordan.

== Former podcasts ==
These podcasts have previously been available from the station.

=== The Matt Edmondson Show ===
Released every Sunday, the best bits from Matt Edmondson's two weekend shows and from when he covers Scott Mills; but it has seemed to stop as there has not been one since August 2017

=== Greg James: That's What He Said ===
Released every Friday, the highlights from Greg James' drive time show. The That's What He Said podcast includes interviews, Star Caller, Ask The Nation, Nerd Alert and other features from the afternoon show.

=== Radio 1 Chart Show ===
Released every Monday, the rundown of the UK Charts presented by Reggie Yates.

=== Radio 1 Stories ===
Released every Monday, this podcast is a documentary, that covers topics such as society and youth culture.

=== Best of Chris Moyles ===
Selected highlights of the past week's shows of The Chris Moyles Show, released every Friday. Also available as Best of Chris Moyles Enhanced with the audio being identical to the Best of Chris Moyles but distributed with pictures which can be viewed on listeners' computers or MP3 players.

=== Zane Lowe Podcast ===
Presented by Zane Lowe. Contains Zane's top 10 tracks every week.

=== Huw Stephens ===
New unsigned music presented by Huw Stephens. Genres include hip-hop, drum and bass, electronica, indie and folk.

=== Best of Nick Grimshaw ===
Released every Thursday or Friday, it contains highlights from The Radio 1 Breakfast Show with Nick Grimshaw.

=== Scott Mills Daily ===
Released every weekday, th best bits from The Scott Mills Show and The Radio 1 Breakfast Show when Scott covers for Greg. Podcast archive available on www.unofficialmills.co.uk.
