= Classic Albums (radio show) =

British radio programme, 1990-1992

- Running time: 1 hour
- Country of origin: United Kingdom
- Language: English
- Home station: BBC Radio 1
- Hosted by: Roger Scott; Richard Skinner
- Original release: 20 May 1989 – 26 May 1992

Classic Albums is a radio programme which ran from 1989 to 1992 on BBC Radio 1. Each episode was an hour in length. The shows were hosted initially by Roger Scott and later by Richard Skinner.
