= Egton House =

Former BBC building in Westminster, England

Coordinates: 51.5186°N 0.1431°W

Egton House in Langham Street in the City of Westminster was home to BBC Radio 1 from 1985 until 1996 and BBC Radio 3 for a period.

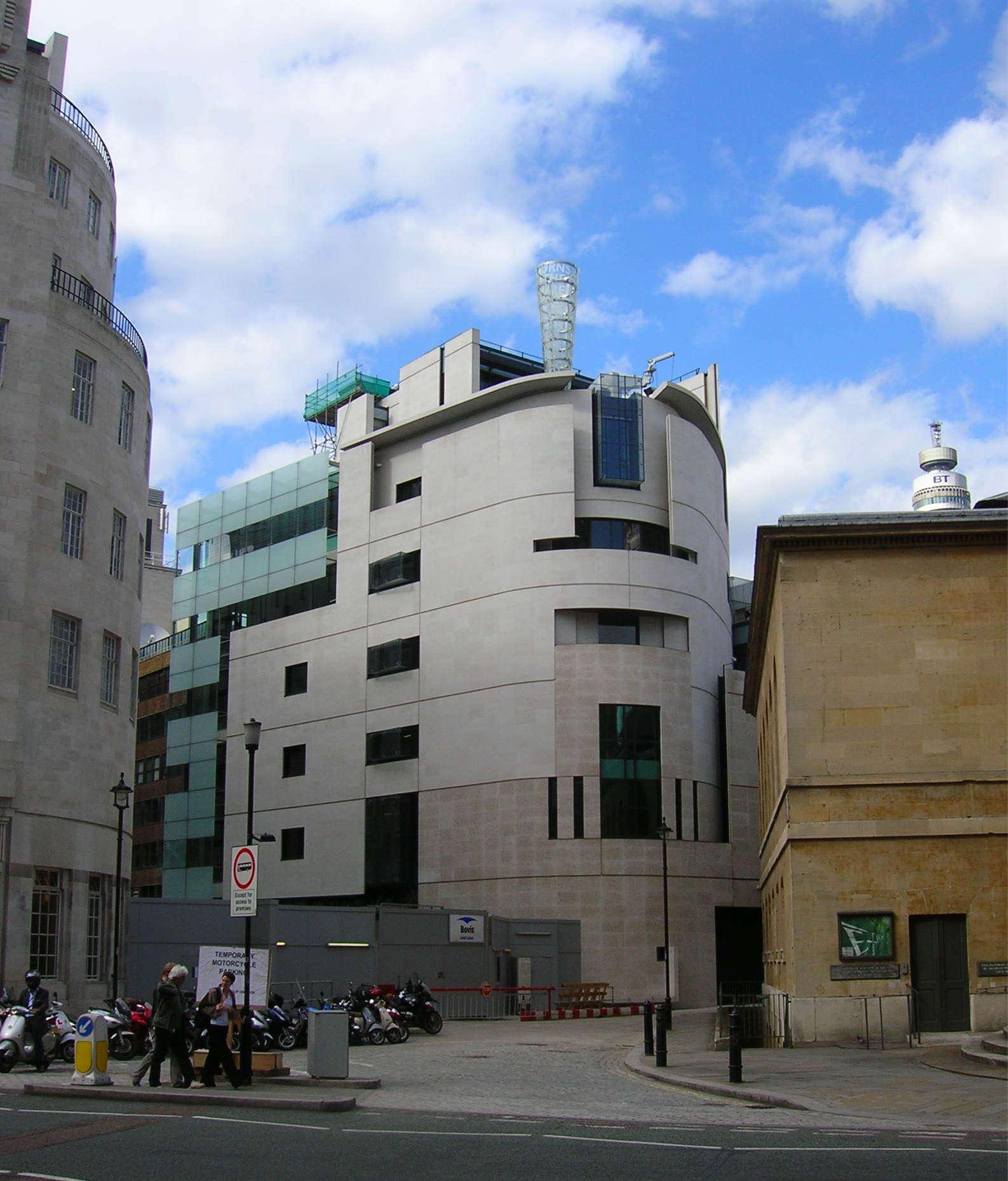
The John Peel Wing, built on the site in 2003

Radio 1 moved to Yalding House on Great Portland Street in 1996, and Egton House was demolished in 2003 to make way for the Egton Wing of BBC Broadcasting House, later renamed the John Peel Wing. Jo Whiley was the last presenter to broadcast from Egton House (12pm-2pm on Wednesday 9 October 1996).

Egton House was also home to the BBC Gramophone Library, a collection of over one million records and CDs. The 78 rpm collection was held in the basement of The Langham which is across the road in Langham Place and has now reverted to being a luxury hotel. Egton House was linked to Broadcasting House by an underground tunnel which was often used to smuggle celebrities such as David Cassidy and The Osmonds into the main building avoiding waiting fans.
