= Andy Batten-Foster =

British television presenter

Andrew Batten-Foster (born May 1953) is a British former BBC music presenter, who became a television producer and director, a university media lecturer and the owner of Cactus Pictures.

== Career ==
Batten-Foster began his media career in 1977 in the newsroom at Radio Bristol. While there he learned of a possible job presenting a new arts and music television programme to be produced by David Pritchard for which he successfully auditioned. RPM featured a regular piece by Auberon Waugh that had to be checked by lawyers before it could be broadcast, and the first television appearance of the celebrity chef Keith Floyd. Batten-Foster moved on to a job at BBC Radio One. In 1983 he presented the Saturday Live show with Richard Skinner. He was also one of the presenters of "Live Aid" in 1985. He then moved into television, first by directing "The Antiques Roadshow" before eventually becoming an executive producer on a wide range of BBC television shows including "999", presented by Michael Buerk, He also set up a New York office for the BBC to produce programmes for the Discovery Networks and in 2002 was part of the editorial team responsible for re-launching 'Top Gear'

Batten-Foster suffered a near fatal bout of meningitis in 2010 before making a full recovery. He went on to become the Bristol chair of the Royal Television Society from 2008 to 2013. He then taught media studies - international formats and television commissioning - to students at Regent's University in London, Bath Spa University and Solent Southampton University.
