= Charles McLelland =

Former BBC Radio controller

Charles McLelland (19 November 1930 – 2 December 2004) was the controller of BBC Radio 1 and BBC Radio 2 from 1976 to 1978, and the controller solely of BBC Radio 2 from 1978 to 1980, when the two stations' management teams were separated.

McLelland served in the Royal Artillery for two years as his national service commitment, before joining The Glasgow Herald in 1954 working as a sub-editor and leader writer.

McLelland was the head of the BBC Arabic service from 1971 to 1975 and played an important role in feeding the growing interest in Asian music and culture in Britain. To prepare for the job he took a one-year course in Arabic at the Middle East Centre for Arab Studies in Lebanon.

While McLelland was the controller of Radio 2, the station started broadcasting 24 hours a day. He also played a pivotal role in radio planning as chairman of the European Broadcasting Union radio programme committee.

He left the BBC in 1986 to become director-general of the Association of British Travel Agents in 1987.

== Personal life ==
McLelland married his wife Phillipa (nee Murphy), and they had three daughters and a son. McLelland lived in his later years in the village of Tisbury, Wiltshire. He died on December 2, 2004, aged 74.
