= Richard Skinner (broadcaster) =

British radio and television presenter (born 1951)

- Born: 26 December 1951 (age 73); Portsmouth, Hampshire, England
- Occupations: Presenter and radio DJ
- Years active: 1970–2012

Richard Skinner (born 26 December 1951) is a British radio and television presenter.

He was the opening announcer and TV anchor at the Live Aid concert in 1985, and is the only presenter to have fronted all three of the BBC's leading pop music programmes, The Old Grey Whistle Test and Top of the Pops on television and the Radio One Top 40 show.

== Early career ==
Skinner grew up in Portsmouth where he attended Portsmouth Grammar School. In 1970, while still at school, he co-founded Portsmouth Hospital Broadcasting, a radio station serving St Mary's Hospital, Portsmouth. He later became a newspaper reporter for The News in Portsmouth and a newspaper in Kent before joining BBC Radio Medway as a music presenter. Later in 1971, Skinner joined BBC Radio Solent as a station assistant; he would later present weekly pop show Beat 'n Track on Solent.

== Radio 1 ==
In October 1973, Skinner joined BBC Radio 1 as one of the original presenters of Newsbeat. He continued in this role until 1980, when he became a regular presenter of music programmes for Radio 1, taking over the Monday-Thursday evening show from Mike Read in December 1980. At the same time Skinner continued with Newsbeat as a studio producer and also worked as an in-vision continuity announcer for Thames Television. According to Skinner, during his time working on Newsbeat he broke the news of the death of John Lennon to Paul McCartney's household by phone in the early hours of 9 December 1980.

In late 1981, Skinner became presenter of Radio 1's Rock On magazine show on Saturday afternoons and Roundtable on Friday evenings, on which he and guests would review the week's new releases. He continued with the programme until late 1985. In addition to Roundtable, from 1983 Skinner presented the Saturday Live show from 4 to 6:30 pm alongside Andy Batten-Foster.

On 30 September 1984, 17 years to the day after Radio 1 began, Skinner took over the Sunday afternoon Top 40 show, also broadcast on FM. That same day David Jensen, who had just left Radio 1, started presenting The Network Chart Show on commercial radio in competition.

On BBC television, Skinner presented Top of the Pops from 1980 to 1985 and 1988 to 1989, and The Old Grey Whistle Test from 1984 to 1986. He also played two roles in the Band Aid and Live Aid phenomenon of the 1980s. Instead of publicising a new Boomtown Rats release as planned, Bob Geldof announced the creation of the Band Aid project on Skinner's Radio 1 show in 1984.

Then on 13 July 1985, Skinner made the opening announcement at Live Aid ("It's twelve noon in London ...") as the event got underway. He also fronted the first hours of BBC TV's Bafta Award-winning coverage.

== Capital London ==
Richard Skinner left Radio 1 in Spring 1986 to join Capital Radio, becoming the first presenter to leave the BBC Top 40 show of his own accord, and was succeeded by Bruno Brookes. At Capital, he presented on its FM Album Rock station CFM and hosted The Way It Is – Capital's equivalent of Radio 1's Newsbeat.

== Return to Radio 1 ==
In October 1988, when Radio 1 – which had acquired its own FM transmitters – extended its hours, Skinner rejoined the station to host a midnight show to play a mix of album-orientated music. In late 1989, Skinner took over the Saturday afternoon Radio 1 show the 'Saturday Sequence' from Roger Scott following the latter's early death from cancer. In 1991 Skinner also took over the helming of Scott's series Classic Albums.

In April 1990, he left the midnight show to be replaced by Bob Harris, but continued with the Saturday Sequence, where he remained until 1991, when Johnnie Walker took over.

== GLR ==
From the turn of the 1990s, while still at Radio 1, Skinner also presented a daily show on BBC GLR, an eclectic mix of music, recorded and live, and live interviews from pop to politics. This continued until the end of December 1992.

== Virgin Radio ==
On 30 April 1993, he hosted Virgin Radio's first programme playing two exclusive premiere cover tracks: "Born To Be Wild" by INXS and "Purple Haze" by The Cure. His weekday morning show ran from then until the autumn of 1996.

== Magic ==
After a short spell at London's Liberty Radio as breakfast presenter alongside Carol McGiffin, in 1997 Skinner joined London's Melody FM, which later became Magic 105.4, presenting the mid-morning show for six years until September 2003. In August 2013 Skinner returned to Magic 105.4 to provide cover for holidaying presenters. Skinner also continued to provide cover in 2014.

== Virgin Radio Classic Rock ==
In late 2003, Skinner was freelancing at the south-coast station Wave 105. Then in early 2004 he rejoined Virgin Radio on the London digital station Virgin Radio Classic Rock, where he hosted the mid-morning show, which was initially recorded, but broadcast live from 27 June 2005. During this period, he provided holiday cover on Virgin Radio. He left when live programming on Virgin Radio Classic Rock was abandoned in December 2005.

== Classic Gold/BBC Radio Berkshire ==
After freelancing on the Classic Gold network, in April 2006 Skinner joined BBC Radio Berkshire to host the Saturday and Sunday mid-morning programmes. During this time he also covered for holidaying presenters. He left on 6 January 2008.

== Original 106 ==
In January 2008, Skinner joined Original 106 presenting weekday mid-mornings and the show Richard Skinner's Original Album Chart on Sunday afternoons.

== Xfm/Radio X ==
Skinner joined Xfm, now known as Radio X, in January 2009 to present the station's networked mid-morning show in London and Manchester. Skinner left Xfm in August 2011.

== Absolute Radio 70s ==
In October 2011, Richard Skinner was announced to host the opening show for the station Absolute Radio 70s on 29 November. Skinner presented afternoons on Absolute Radio 70s until March 2012. Afterwards, Martyn Lee replaced Skinner as afternoon host.

Media offices
Preceded by Simon Bates	BBC Radio 1 chart show presenter 30 September 1984 – 23 March 1986	Succeeded by Bruno Brookes
