= Yalding House =

Building in Great Portland Street, London, England

Coordinates: 51.52074°N 0.142822°W

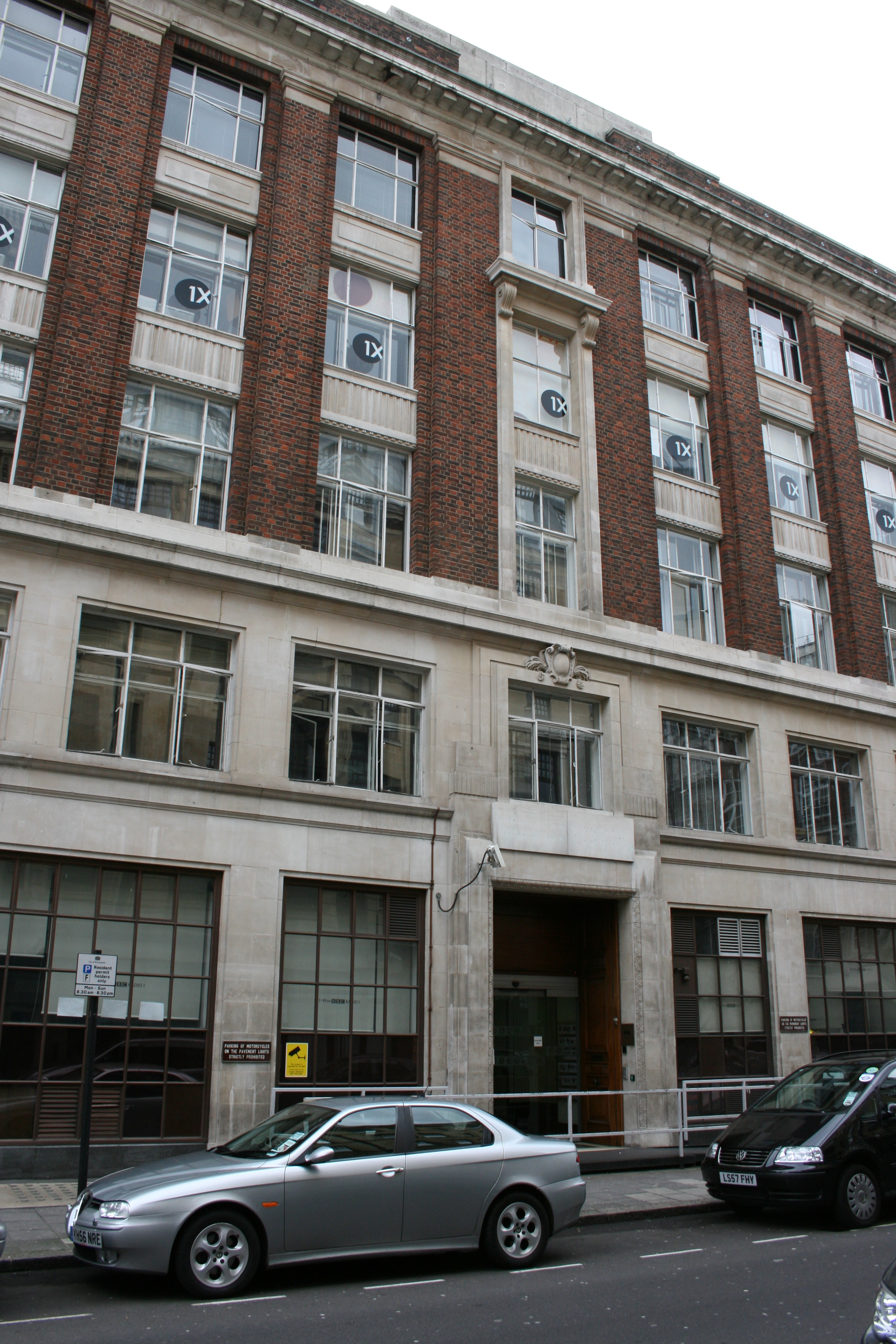
Yalding House

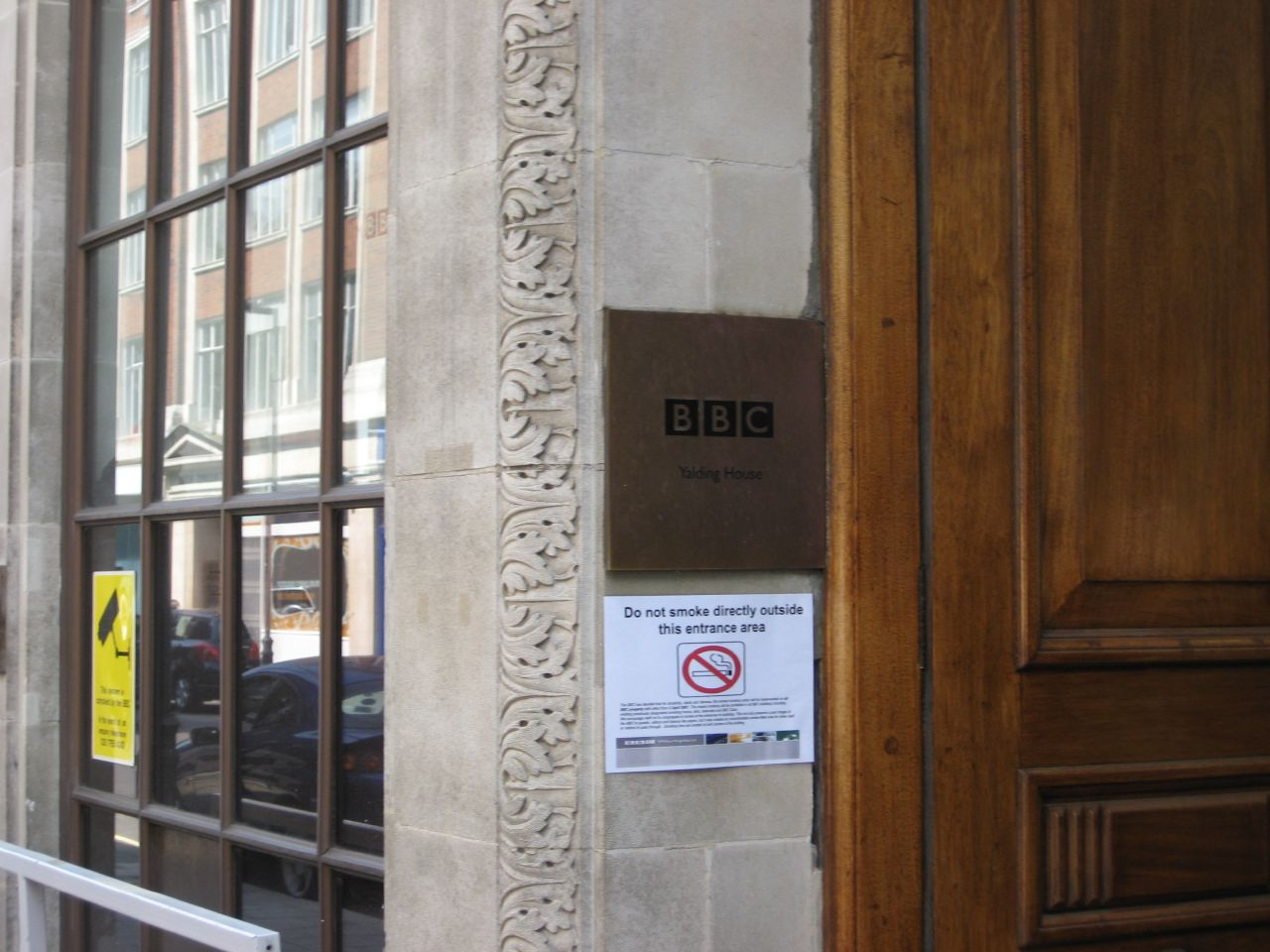
The entrance

Yalding House is a building at 152–156 Great Portland Street, London, United Kingdom. It was formerly owned by the British Broadcasting Corporation (BBC), and from 1952 until 2013 housed the corporation's music department.

The BBC Central Music Library was located on the ground floor and basement: the building's former role as a car showroom made it ideal for the heavy shelving required to store the collection. The BBC Third Programme, later renamed Radio 3, was also based at Yalding House.

It became the home of BBC Radio 1, together with Newsbeat, in 1996 when the Radio 1 studios were moved from Egton House. BBC Radio 1Xtra was launched at Yalding House.

On 14 December 2012, Radio 1 broadcast its last show from Yalding House which was The Radio 1 Breakfast Show with Nick Grimshaw.

By April 2013 only BBC management teams and the BBC Audio and Music Department was left in the building and by september of September 2013 the BBC had handed the building back to the landlord and concluding its occupancy After 60 years.

Yalding House contained five studios which were used to broadcast shows on Radio 1 and 1Xtra.

- Studio Y1 - used mainly for production.
- Studio Y2 - used by The Radio 1 Breakfast Show with Nick Grimshaw, The Official Chart with Reggie Yates, Scott Mills and Greg James.
- Studio Y3 - used by Fearne Cotton, Zane Lowe and Huw Stephens.
- Studios Y4 & Y5 - used mainly by 1Xtra, but occasionally by Radio 1, as needed.
