= Johnny Beerling =

British radio producer and station controller

- Born: John William Beerling; 12 April 1937 (age 89); England
- Children: 2; including David
- Website: www.johnnybeerling.com

John William Beerling (born 12 April 1937) is a British radio producer and station controller.

== Early life ==
Beerling attended the Sir Roger Manwood's School in Sandwich, Kent.

== Career ==
=== National Service ===
He began his radio career during national service from 1955 to 1957, when he ran a radio station for the Royal Air Force station British Forces Aden in the Aden Protectorate, acting as its station manager, studio engineer and morning DJ.

=== BBC ===
In 1957, he joined the BBC as a Technical Operator and soon became a Studio Manager. In the early sixties he was appointed as a producer in the Gramophone Department where he worked on a number of popular programmes such as Housewives' Choice, Midday Spin, and Two Way Family Favourites as well as late evening shows like Music to Midnight. Beerling brought in Simon Dee from the pirate radio scene and he was also the first producer of Terry Wogan. As an admirer of the pirate radio stations he devised a fast moving new radio show on Saturdays called Where It's At, one of Kenny Everett's earliest shows. Beerling was one of the few employees of the BBC Light Programme in the mid-1960s to regard the model of offshore pirate radio as one which the BBC would have to follow and to that end he managed to take a trip to visit Radio London to see for himself how they operated.

=== Radio 1 ===
In 1967, the Marine Offences Bill led to the close down of the pirate radio stations and the BBC decided to set up Radio 1 to provide a legal alternative. Johnny was at the forefront of this process, recruiting the DJ talent and devising the jingles, subsequently producing the first ever show with Tony Blackburn.

He became an Executive Producer in 1972 and the following year conceived and launched the show for which he is best known, the Radio 1 Roadshow. This grew from a small caravan operation on Newquay Beach to an 80-foot mobile stage show housed in a series of articulated trucks, supported by a giant outdoor TV display visited by 500,000 people a year.

In 1985, he was appointed Controller of the Radio 1 Network, responsible for the entire output including such major projects as the sound for Live Aid. During his time there he cultivated the "Smashie and Nicey" image despite appointing more music oriented presenters like Mark Goodier, Nicky Campbell and Simon Mayo. He oversaw the transfer of the network from AM to a better quality FM transmission system. In programming, he was responsible to for increasing the number of social action campaigns, extending news coverage and increasing the coverage of live concerts and music sessions recorded in Radio 1 studios. He also introduced comedy onto the airwaves of Radio 1 with shows like The Mary Whitehouse Experience and Victor Lewis Smith.

While Controller of Radio 1, he removed Jimmy Savile from the BBC Radio airwaves "because his programme was tired and boring". Of Savile's abusive behaviour, he said: "Jimmy Savile was a loner. He rarely socialised with any of the DJs or staff at Radio 1...I was not aware of any sexual improprieties which have now been uncovered."

During this time, Beerling was affectionately known, and referred to on air by some such as Steve Wright in his afternoon show, as "Johnny Bee-Leg". Whilst he was controller, Radio 1 began broadcasting 24 hours a day in May 1991. Beerling took enforced early retirement, aged 56, from the station in October 1993, and many of the station's veteran DJs either resigned or were sacked when Matthew Bannister succeeded him as controller. The network's ethos, music policy and target audience changed dramatically. Beerling publicly criticised the new regime at the BBC, specifically Director-General John Birt.

In May 1995, the BBC re-hired Beerling on a short-term contract to organise the "Music Live '95" event in Birmingham, which was broadcast across all the BBC national networks, including Radio 1.

=== Current radio work ===
Beerling joined Serenade Radio in 2020 and presented his 'Big Band Special' show for six years on www.serenade-radio.com until his retirement in 2026.

=== Radio Data System ===
Johnny Beerling was involved with the Radio Data System from 1985 onwards when the BBC appointed him Chairman of the Programme Experts Group tasked with promoting the system worldwide and ensuring compatible radios became generally available.

His responsibility extended across European territories, via the European Broadcasting Union, which represented the public broadcasters for Western Europe. Beerling commissioned the design of the RDS logo and encouraged car manufacturers to factory-fit compatible radios in their vehicles.

He remained involved as Chairman of the RDS Forum for 30 years until he resigned in 2016.

=== Unique Productions ===
After his departure from Radio 1, Beerling went to work alongside Noel Edmonds, with his production company Unique Productions where he was Chairman of Unique Special Projects and responsible for "Music Live '95" production for the BBC. Since 2007, he has lectured regularly about broadcasting and popular music on ships operated by Cunard, Fred Olson Cruise Lines, Saga Cruises, Thomson Cruises, P&O Cruises and Cruise & Maritime Voyages.

== Awards and honours ==
In 1992, he was the first non-broadcaster to receive a Ferguson Award for an Outstanding Contribution to Music Radio from the Radio Academy. The following year, he was elected President of the Television and Radio Industry Club of Great Britain. He also became a governor of the BRIT School for Performing Arts and Technology in May 1993, and in the same month was presented with a Sony Award for Outstanding Services to the Radio Industry. In 2005 was made a Fellow of the Radio Academy.

== Personal life ==
In 1959 he married Carol Ann Reynolds, with whom he has a son, David Beerling, and daughter, Julie Margaret Wood. They divorced in 1993. Later that year, he married Celia Margeret Potter, whom he also divorced five years later.

He married Susan Patricia Armstrong in 1999. He lives in West Sussex.

Media offices
Preceded by Derek Chinnery	Controller of Radio 1; 1985 – October 1993	Succeeded by Matthew Bannister
