= Matthew Bannister =

British media executive and broadcaster

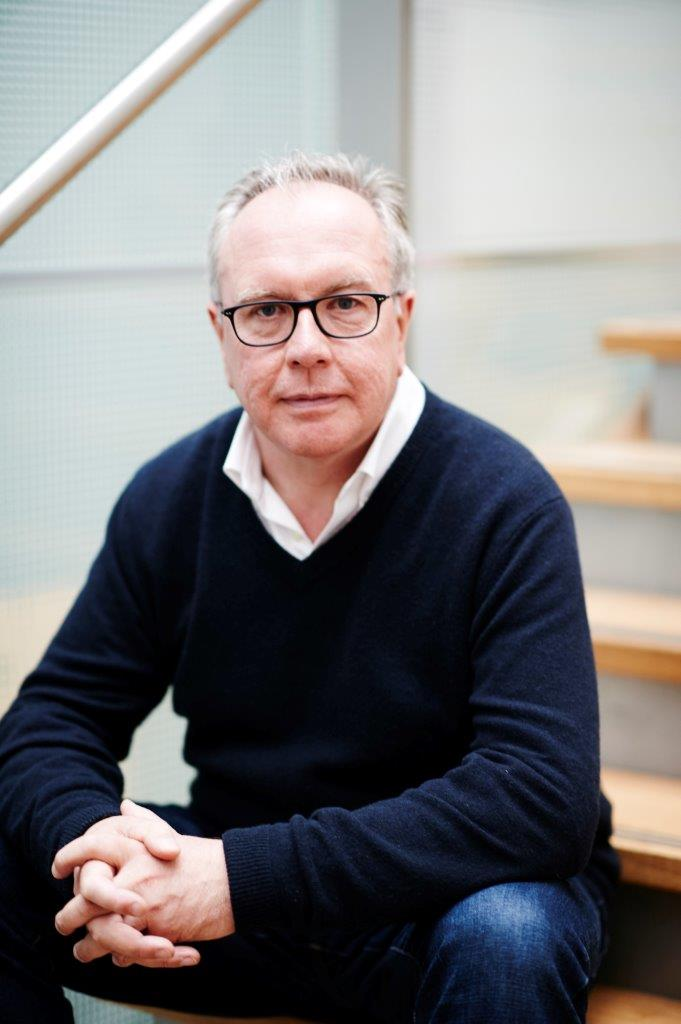
- Born: Richard Matthew Bannister; 16 March 1957 (age 69); Sheffield, England
- Education: University of Nottingham
- Occupations: Broadcaster and podcaster
- Spouse(s): Amanda Walker (m. 1984; died 1988) Shelagh Macleod (m. 1989; died 2005) Katherine Hood (m. 2007; div. 2013) Kate Pluck (m. 2023)
- Children: 2

Richard Matthew Bannister (born 16 March 1957) is a British media executive and broadcaster.

== Early career ==
After attending King Edward VII School, Sheffield, he graduated in law at the University of Nottingham in 1978, and joined BBC Radio Nottingham as a trainee reporter and subsequently the presenter of its speech-based breakfast show, Morning Report. It was here that he first met Trevor Dann, whom he subsequently worked with at BBC Radio 1.

He first worked for Radio 1 as a presenter of its news programme Newsbeat between 1983 and 1985. He worked for Capital Radio as a journalist in the early 1980s, later returning as head of news and talks after leaving Radio 1. He was also co-presenter with Sarah Ward of Capital Radio's The Way It Is.

== Managerial career ==
Bannister first established himself as a name in the radio industry in the late 1980s and early 1990s as managing editor of GLR (Greater London Radio), the BBC's local radio station for London. Here he worked for the first time with Chris Evans, who was pioneering many of the ideas which would later win him greater success and much controversy at Radio 1, and also employed a number of DJs from Radio 1's past, such as Annie Nightingale, Tommy Vance, Janice Long and Johnnie Walker. The line-up also included Danny Baker, Emma Freud and Chris Morris.

After working for two years in the BBC corporate centre on projects related to the renewal of the BBC's Royal Charter, in 1993 Bannister was chosen as the new controller for BBC Radio 1, replacing Johnny Beerling who had worked at the station since its inception in 1967. Many of the DJs, producers and other staff at Radio 1 had grown old with the station, as had the audience. Keen to return the station to its original purpose for "young listeners", Bannister overhauled the staff, resulting in many presenters either resigning or being sacked, and replacing them with new presenters. Over the next few years the station lost approximately 5 million listeners.

The Britpop explosion proved the success of Bannister's strategy: the bands he had championed a year or two earlier, when they were comparatively obscure and marginal, were now part of the mainstream, and Radio 1 was booming again. Chris Evans, who had become a hugely popular figure as breakfast DJ, was the figurehead of this boom, but eventually things went sour; in January 1997 Evans resigned after Bannister refused to allow him to waive his Friday show, to concentrate on his TV show TFI Friday. After Mark Radcliffe and Marc Riley had an unsuccessful stint on the breakfast show, the team of Kevin Greening and Zoe Ball were hosting the breakfast show when Bannister left Radio 1 in 1998 (Ball would subsequently host the show on her own).

In the autumn of 1996 Bannister was appointed director of radio, a post which gave him responsibility for all the national BBC radio networks other than Five Live. He remained controller of Radio 1 alongside this until March 1998, when he was succeeded by Andy Parfitt. In 1999, Bannister was appointed chief executive of BBC Production, responsible for all non-news programme-making on English television, radio and online. He oversaw production centres in London, Manchester, Birmingham and Bristol. When John Birt announced he was stepping down as BBC director general, Bannister lost out to Greg Dyke. After a short stint in 2000 as director of marketing and communications, he returned to radio presenting on BBC 5 Live, Radio 4 and the World Service.

== Return to broadcasting ==
In October 2000 Bannister resigned from the BBC to return to broadcasting. From 2003 to 2005 he had his own late night talk show on BBC Radio 5 Live. He presented four hours of live coverage of the bombings on the London transport system on 7 July 2005. He also deputised for other presenters on the station as well as on programmes on Radio 4 such as Broadcasting House and Saturday PM and sat in for Jeremy Vine on his lunchtime Radio 2 show. Between 2008 and 2018 he hosted Outlook on the BBC World Service. Since 2006 he has presented an obituary programme on Radio 4 called Last Word. In 2023, Last Word was named Best Radio News and Factual Programme at the Voice of the Listener and Viewer Awards for Excellence in Broadcasting.

In 2025, Bannister presented two series of The Song Detectorists on Radio 3, working with an academic project called Music, Heritage, Place to unearth hidden musical gems in county record offices across England. The works were arranged and performed by Nancy Kerr and the Melrose Quartet.

He was chairman of the independent production company Wire Free Productions from 2012 to 2018.

== Folk on Foot ==
In August 2018, Bannister launched his own podcast, Folk on Foot, in which he walks and talks with leading folk performers in the landscapes that have inspired them. During the COVID-19 lockdown, Folk on Foot staged four online Front Room Festivals which raised £327,000 for musicians who had lost their livelihoods. In 2023, Bannister walked 186 miles in two weeks from the Wickham Festival in Hampshire to FolkEast in Suffolk, raising nearly £18,000 for the charity Help Musicians. Bannister also hosts the monthly Official Folk Albums Chart Show on the podcast's YouTube channel, counting down the best-selling and most-streamed folk albums. In 2025, Folk on Foot partnered with the charity Sound Roots to launch The Folk Album of the Year Award. The trophy was presented to the inaugural winner, Barry Kerr, at a live-stream event from Rochdale Town Hall on 17 March 2026.

Folk on Foot has won or been nominated for many awards:

- 2019: British Podcast Awards: Best Arts and Culture: Silver
- 2019: Audio Production Awards: Best Music Producer: Natalie Steed: Gold; Best Music Presenter: Matthew Bannister: Nominee
- 2020: ARIA Awards: Best Independent Podcast: Nominee
- 2020: Lovie Awards: Best Arts and Entertainment Podcast: Gold and People's Winner; Best Individual Episode: Karine Polwart at Fala Moor: Silver
- 2021: Webby Awards: Best Music Podcast: Honoree
- 2021: British Podcast Awards: Best Lockdown Podcast: Nominee
- 2021: Audio Production Awards: Best Music Producer: Natalie Steed: Nominee
- 2022: ARIA Awards: Best Specialist Music Show: Silver
- 2023: ARIA Awards: Best Specialist Music Show: Nominee; Best Music Special (The Musical Village of Pathhead, Midlothian): Nominee
- 2023: Independent Podcast Awards: Best Arts and Culture Podcast; Winner
- 2023: LOVIE Awards: Best Arts, Entertainment and Sport Podcast; Silver and People's Choice Winner
- 2024: ARIA Awards: Best Specialist Music Show: Bronze; Best Music Special: Angeline Morrison in North Cornwall: Nominee
- 2024: British Podcast Awards: Best Arts and Culture Podcast: Nominee
- 2024: Independent Podcast Awards: Best Music Podcast: Nominee; Best Outdoors and Adventure Podcast: Nominee
- 2025: ARIA Awards: Best Music: Nominee
- 2025: British Podcast Awards: Best Arts and Culture Podcast: Nominee
- 2025: Independent Podcast Awards: Best Music Podcast: Highly Commended; Best Arts and Culture Podcast: Nominee

== Honorary doctorates ==
On 20 July 2011 Bannister was awarded an honorary doctorate from his alma mater, the University of Nottingham. On 19 November 2019 he was awarded an honorary doctorate of arts from Sheffield Hallam University. On 19 July 2023 he was awarded an honorary doctorate of letters from the University of Sheffield.

He is a Fellow of the Radio Academy and the Royal Society of Arts.

== Personal life ==
Bannister married his first wife, the radio and TV presenter Amanda Walker, in 1984. Their daughter Jessica was born later the same year. In 1988 Amanda drowned while swimming in the sea off the Spanish Costa Blanca during a family holiday. In 1989, Bannister married Shelagh Macleod, who later became senior vice-president of legal and business affairs at the record company EMI. Their son Joe was born in 1990. Shelagh died of breast cancer in 2005. In 2007, he married Katherine Hood, a private equity investor. They were divorced in 2013. In 2023, he married his long-term partner, Kate Pluck.

Media offices
Preceded by Johnny Beerling	Controller of BBC Radio 1 October 1993 - March 1998	Succeeded by Andy Parfitt
