= List of Top of the Pops presenters =

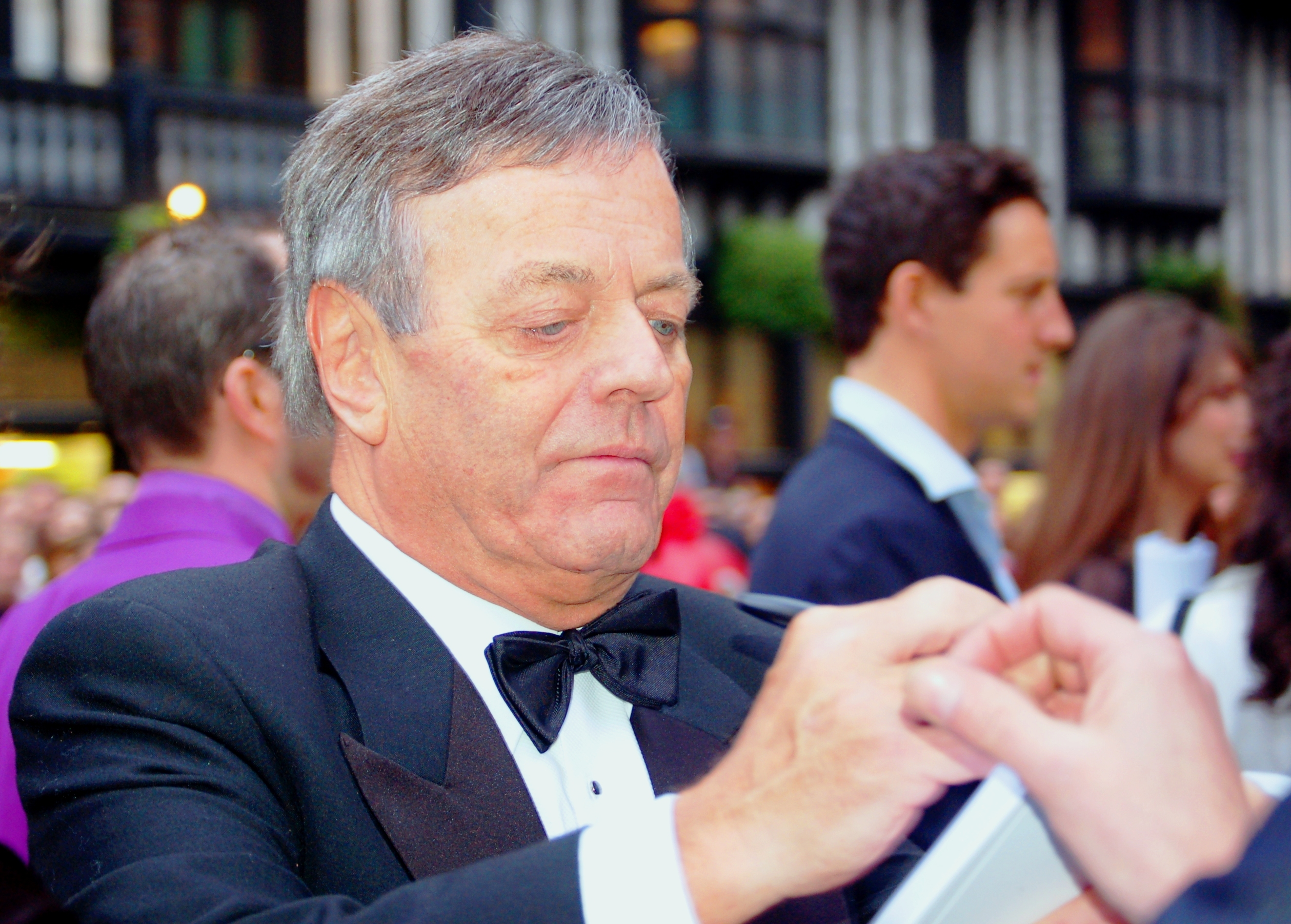
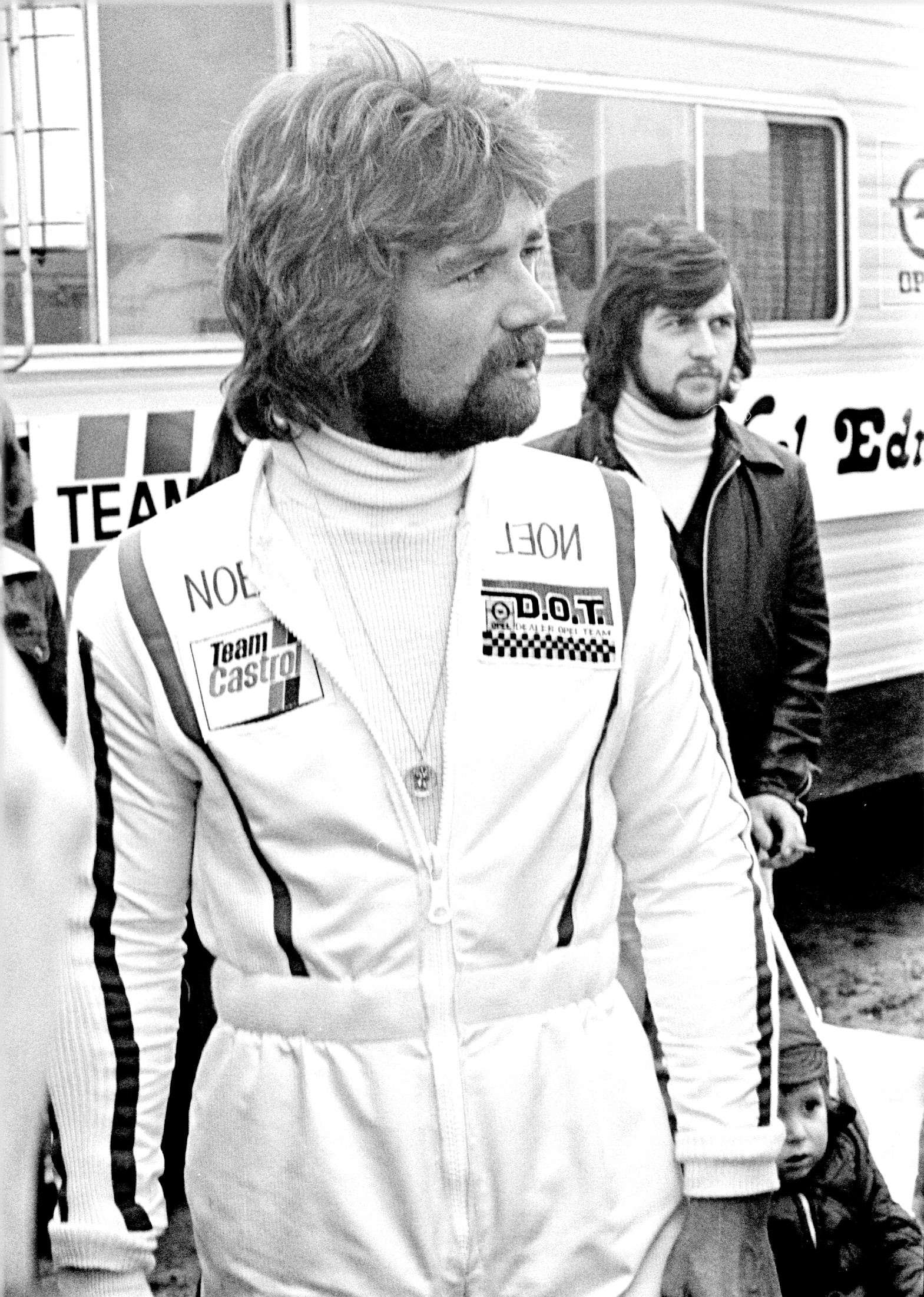
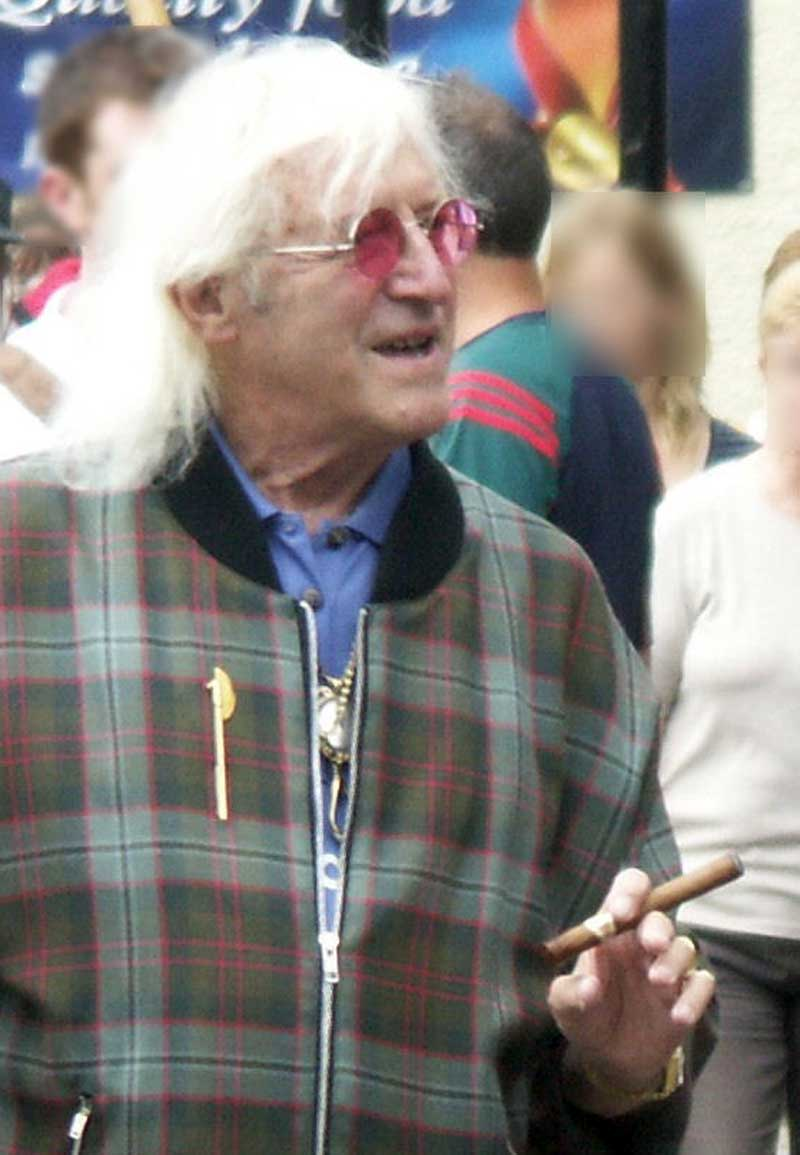
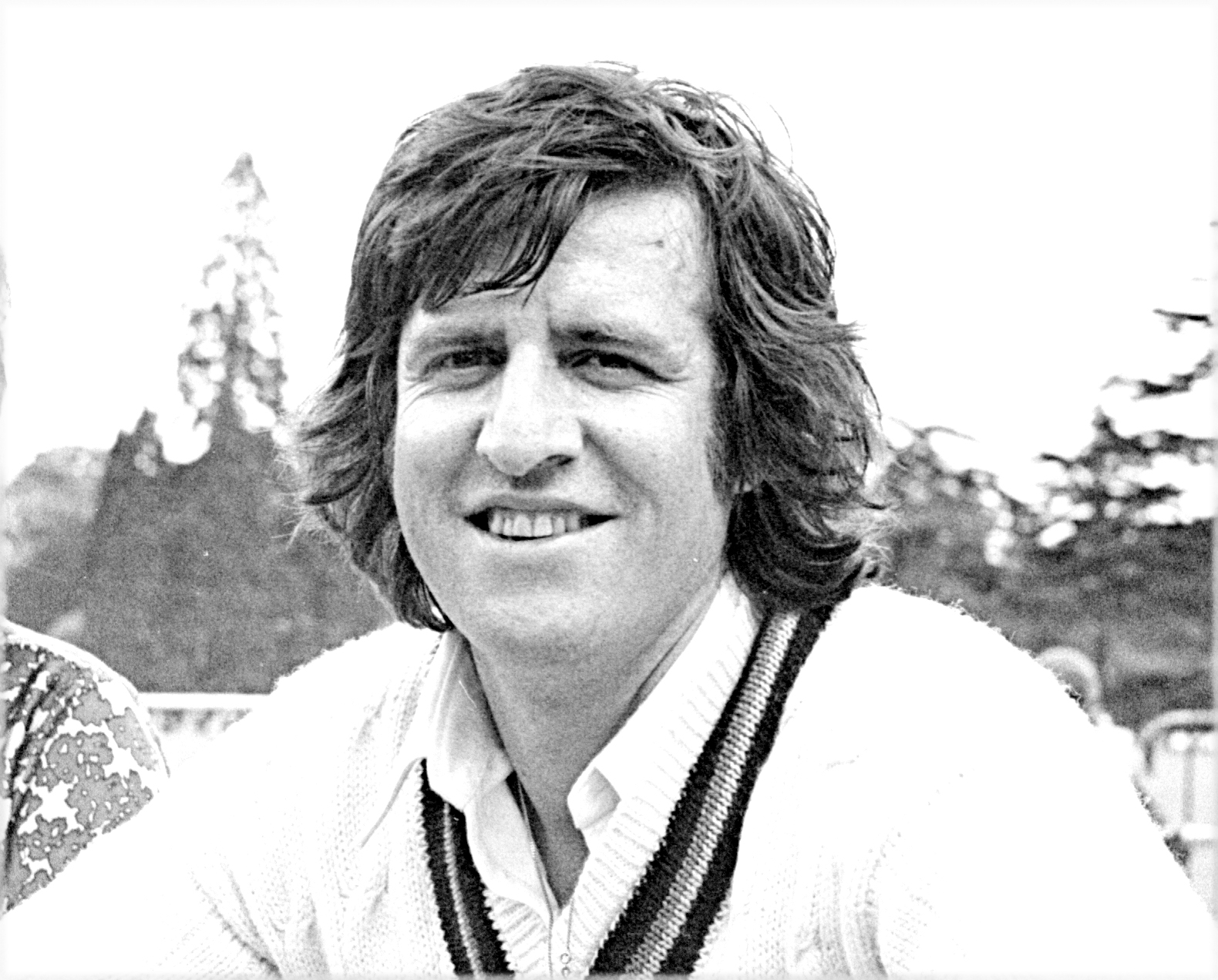
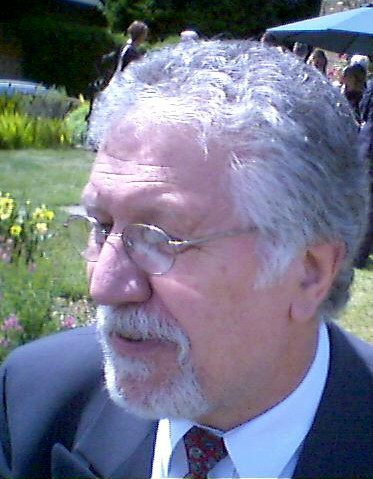
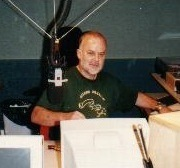
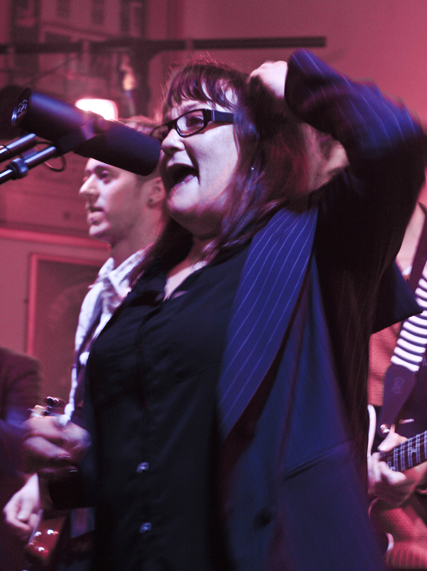
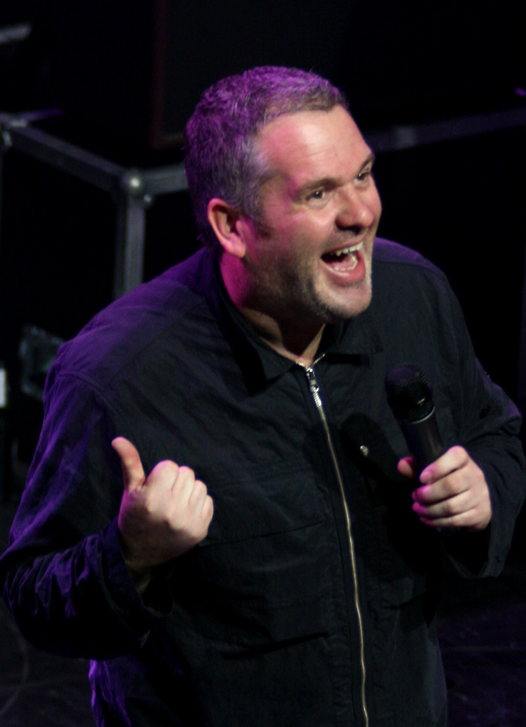
The show was hosted by several presenters, including Tony Blackburn, Noel Edmonds, Jimmy Savile, Alan Freeman, Ed Stewart, Dave Lee Travis, John Peel, Kenny Everett, Janice Long, and Chris Moyles.

Top of the Pops (also known by its abbreviation TOTP) is a British music chart television programme. Until 2006, it was shown each week on the BBC and is now licensed for national versions around the world. The following is a list of presenters who have hosted the BBC show, including the many guest presenters over the years.

== 1960s–1970s ==
Upon its inception in 1964, Top of the Pops was presented by a team of disc jockeys in rotation: Alan Freeman, David Jacobs, Pete Murray and Jimmy Savile. Savile presented the very first episode from Dickenson Road Studios in Manchester on 1 January 1964, and would continue as the longest-serving presenter until hosting his final show on 30 August 1984. Samantha Juste appeared as the disc girl for several episodes until 1967. Jacobs was replaced by Simon Dee in 1966.

- Jimmy Savile (1964–1984, plus 31 December 1988, 19 October 2001, 19 September 2003 and 30 July 2006)
- Alan Freeman (1964–1969, plus 9 July 1981, 5 January 1984 and 31 December 1988)
- Pete Murray (1964–1969, plus 9 July 1981 and 31 December 1988)
- David Jacobs (1964–1966, plus 9 July 1981, 5 May 1983 and 31 December 1988)
- Samantha Juste (1965–1967)
- Simon Dee (1966–1969)

The start of BBC Radio 1 in 1967 brought a new influx of disc-jockeys to the presenting roster, sometimes as co-presenters, although most only stayed with TOTP for a short while. Of these, only Ed Stewart and John Peel would become long-term regulars, though there would be a gap before either would return as such. By 1970, only Savile and Blackburn remained of the 1960s regulars, and between them they would host all the editions from January 1970 until their duopoly was broken by Ed Stewart's return in March 1971.

- Tony Blackburn (1967, 1969–1979 and 1981–1983, plus 31 December 1988 and 30 July 2006)
- Emperor Rosko (1967, 1974–1975)
- Stuart Henry (1967–1969)
- Dave Cash (1968)
- Kenny Everett (1967 and 1973, plus 31 December 1988)
- John Peel co-hosted a single edition in 1968, but returned more prominently in the 1980s (see below).
- Ed Stewart (1968, 1971–1977)
- David Symonds (1968)
- 14 December 1967 – Mike Lennox co-presented with Alan Freeman
- 14 March 1968 – Tom Edwards co-presented with Jimmy Savile
- 11 April 1968 – Lulu co-presented with Jimmy Savile
- 2 May 1968 – Alan Price co-presented with Alan Freeman
- 23 May 1968 – Micky Dolenz of The Monkees co-presented with Jimmy Savile
- 6 June 1968 – Davy Jones of The Monkees co-presented with Jimmy Savile

== 1970s–1980s ==
- Jimmy Savile (1964–1984, plus 31 December 1988, 19 October 2001, 19 September 2003 and 30 July 2006)
- Tony Blackburn (1967, 1969–1979, 1981–1983, plus 31 December 1988 and 30 July 2006)
- Ed Stewart (1968, 1971–1972, 1975–1977)
- Noel Edmonds (1972–1978, plus 5 May 1983)
- Kenny Everett (1973, plus 31 December 1988)
- Greg Edwards (1974)
- Dave Lee Travis (1973–1984, plus 30 July 2006)
- Emperor Rosko (1974–1975)
- Paul Burnett (1974, 1977–1979, plus 25 December 1981 and 30 September 1982)
- David Hamilton (1976–1977, plus 31 December 1988)
- David "Kid" Jensen (1976–1984, plus 31 December 1988)
- Peter Powell (1977–1988)
- Mike Read (1978–1989, plus 30 July 2006)
- Simon Bates (1979–1988)
- 15 December 1977 – Elton John was guest presenter
- 11 October 1979 – Andy Peebles presented, though did not become a regular host until 1983 (see 1980s–1991 below)

== 1980s–1991 ==
The close association with Radio 1 continued into the 1980s, with all TOTP presenters drawn from the ranks of disc-jockeys at the station. The list below represents the main TOTP presenters during this period with many other Radio 1 disc-jockeys, for example Liz Kershaw, Adrian Juste and Adrian John also appearing on special programmes such as Christmas broadcasts and milestones for TOTP or Radio 1. For this reason, the 30 September 1982 show celebrating Radio 1's fifteenth birthday affords Annie Nightingale, in her one and only appearance and as one of nineteen presenters that day, the honour of being the first female presenter of Top of the Pops, beating Janice Long – who would go on to present TOTP regularly for nearly six years – by three months.

Presenters were also brought in from children's television, including Children's BBC presenters Andy Crane and Simon Parkin, Blue Peter's Caron Keating, and Anthea Turner and Jenny Powell who worked together on Saturday morning show UP2U.

- Jimmy Savile (1964–1984, plus 31 December 1988, 19 October 2001, 19 September 2003 and 30 July 2006)
- Dave Lee Travis (1973–1984, plus 30 July 2006)
- David Jensen also known as "Kid Jensen" (1976–1984, plus 31 December 1988)
- Peter Powell (1977–1988)
- Mike Read (1978–1989, plus 30 July 2006)
- Simon Bates (1979–1988)
- Richard Skinner (1980–1985, plus 6 October 1988 and 19 January 1989)
- Tommy Vance (1980–1984)
- Steve Wright (1980–1989, plus Top of the Pops 2: 1997–2004, 2006–2007, 2008, 2009)
- John Peel (1982–1987, plus 25 December 1981 and 14 December 1995)
- Andy Peebles (1979, 1983–1984, plus 25 December 1981 and 30 September 1982)
- Tony Blackburn (1967, 1969–1979, 1981–1983, plus 31 December 1988 and 30 July 2006)
- Mike Smith (1982–1988)
- Janice Long (1982–1988, plus 30 July 2006)
- Gary Davies (1982–1991)
- Pat Sharp (1982–1983, also a member of British vocal duo Pat and Mick together with Mick Brown, plus 30 July 2006)
- Bruno Brookes (1984–1991, 1994–1995)
- Dixie Peach (1985–1986)
- Paul Jordan (1985–1986)
- Simon Mayo (1986–1991, 1994–1996)
- Nicky Campbell (1988–1991, 1994–1997)
- Mark Goodier (1988–1991, 1994–1996, read the Top 20 chart rundown out-of-vision: 1997–2002)
- Andy Crane (1988–1989)
- Anthea Turner (1988–1991)
- Sybil Ruscoe (1988–1989)
- Jenny Powell (1989)
- Jakki Brambles (1989–1991)

Special appearances:

- 9 July and 28 August 1980 – B.A. Robertson co-presented with Peter Powell
- 7 August 1980 – after hosting alone in 1977, Elton John returned to co-host with Peter Powell
- 14 August 1980 – Roger Daltrey of The Who co-presented with Tommy Vance
- 21 August 1980 – Cliff Richard co-presented with Steve Wright
- 4 September 1980 – Kevin Keegan co-presented with Dave Lee Travis
- 18 September 1980 – Olivia Newton-John co-presented with Simon Bates
- 25 September 1980 – Russ Abbot co-presented with Mike Read
- 30 October 1980 – Colin Berry co-presented with Peter Powell
- 9 July 1981 – Alan Freeman, David Jacobs and Pete Murray both returned after over a decade's absence to present with Jimmy Savile
- 25 December 1981 – Paul Gambaccini co-presented alongside Adrian Juste and former presenter Paul Burnett, with regular presenters Andy Peebles, Dave Lee Travis, Simon Bates, David Jensen, Tony Blackburn, John Peel, Steve Wright, Peter Powell, Jimmy Savile, Richard Skinner and Mike Read
- 25 March 1982 – footballer Garth Crooks co-presented with Peter Powell
- 27 May 1982 – Debbie Harry of Blondie was guest presenter with John Peel.
- 30 September 1982 – Radio 1 celebrated its fifteenth anniversary with a special TOTP featuring disc-jockeys Paul Gambaccini, Adrian John, Adrian Juste, Jonathan King, Alexis Korner and Annie Nightingale, as well as former presenter Paul Burnett and regular presenters Dave Lee Travis, Andy Peebles, Mike Read, David Jensen, Tony Blackburn, John Peel, Jimmy Savile, Mike Smith, Steve Wright, Tommy Vance, Richard Skinner and Peter Powell
- 5 May 1983 – TOTP celebrated its thousandth show with the return of Noel Edmonds and David Jacobs as well as Paul Gambaccini and regular presenters Dave Lee Travis, Steve Wright, John Peel, Gary Davies, Mike Smith, Peter Powell, Simon Bates, Tommy Vance, Richard Skinner, Mike Read, Tony Blackburn, David Jensen, Andy Peebles, Janice Long, Jimmy Savile and Pat Sharp
- 29 December 1983 – Adrian John guest presented with Tommy Vance, Richard Skinner, Peter Powell and Gary Davies
- 25 December 1984 – no regular presenters featured, with performers linking between songs
- 27 December 1984 – Lenny Henry
- 25 December 1985 – Jonathan King was guest presenter alongside John Peel, Janice Long, Dixie Peach, Steve Wright and Gary Davies
- 5 May 1988 – Adrian John co-presented with Bruno Brookes
- 11 August 1988 – Liz Kershaw was guest presenter with Bruno Brookes
- 6 October 1988 – Richard Skinner returned after three years to co-present with Simon Mayo
- 20 October 1988 – Caron Keating co-presented with Steve Wright
- 17 November 1988 – Susie Mathis co-presented with Gary Davies
- 8 December 1988 – Caron Keating co-presented with Nicky Campbell
- 31 December 1988 – TOTP's 25th anniversary saw the return of Jimmy Savile, David Jacobs, Pete Murray, Alan Freeman, Kenny Everett, David Jensen, Tony Blackburn, David Hamilton and Peter Powell along with Paul Gambaccini alongside regular presenters Simon Bates, Mark Goodier and Mike Read
- 19 January 1989 – Richard Skinner co-presented with Bruno Brookes
- 23 February 1989 – Susie Mathis co-presented with Bruno Brookes
- 9 March 1989 – Lenny Henry co-presented with Hale and Pace and Nicky Campbell for Comic Relief. All would go on to hold the golden microphone in the mid-1990s (see below)
- 16 March 1989 – Rod McKenzie was guest presenter with Radio 1 breakfast show colleagues and TOTP presenters Simon Mayo and Sybil Ruscoe
- 15 June 1989 – Simon Parkin co-presented with Mark Goodier
- 29 June 1989 – Tim Smith was an uncredited co-presenter with Anthea Turner
- 27 July 1989 – Simon Parkin co-presented with Mark Goodier
- 28 December 1989 – Paul Gambaccini was guest presenter of a special end-of-decade show with Mike Read

The 1991 Gulf War caused the episode due to be transmitted on 17 January 1991 (presented by Nicky Campbell) to be rescheduled for Saturday 19 January.

== 1991–1994 revamp: The break away from Radio 1 and Television Centre ==
When production moved to the BBC Elstree Centre in Hertfordshire, a new team of young presenters were introduced in place of the Radio 1 disc-jockeys. Tony Dortie and Claudia Simon had been working for Children's BBC, with Dortie having presented Saturday morning magazine UP2U (along with former TOTP presenters Jenny Powell and Anthea Turner) in the summers of 1988 and 1989 and Simon being one of the presenters of BFT in 1990. Elayne Smith was an underground club disc-jockey and compere, who started hosting Channel 4 late-night variety show The 291 Club just a few weeks before the revamp. Smith left after just two episodes to concentrate on The 291 Club, and was replaced in March 1992 by Femi Oke, who was working at BBC Radio 5, whilst seventeen-year-old Mark Franklin was picked from local radio station BBC Radio Wiltshire. With a new theme tune and set of titles, which was modelled on a weathervane, the first show was presented by Mark Franklin and Tony Dortie on 3 October 1991, with the first live performance being Erasure's "Love to Hate You".

Performance rules were altered so that acts had to sing live, whether they wanted to or not, and performances reflected the current album charts and American Billboard Hot 100, as well as the UK Singles Chart. Two presenters from the team always hosted each episode until July 1992, when Tony Dortie and Mark Franklin began to host some shows individually. By October 1992, the rest of the team had been dropped completely.

- Mark Franklin (1991–1994)
- Tony Dortie (1991–1994)
- Elayne Smith (7 November and 5 December 1991)
- Claudia Simon (1991–1992)
- Adrian Woolfe(1991–1992) credited on-screen as Adrian Rose
- Steve Anderson (1991–1992)
- Femi Oke (1992)

Special appearances:

- 2 April 1992 – Harry Enfield and Paul Whitehouse were guest presenters under the alias of Smashie and Nicey
- 18 June 1992 – Bob Geldof guested as a co-presenter with Mark Franklin
- 17 December 1992 – Mr Blobby guested as a co-presenter with Tony Dortie
- 25 December 1992 – Sid Owen and Danniella Westbrook of EastEnders made guest appearances with Tony Dortie and Mark Franklin
- 25 December 1993 – Patsy Palmer of EastEnders made a guest appearance with Tony Dortie and Mark Franklin
- 4 January 1994 – Smashie and Nicey returned to present a special 30th birthday show
- 20 January 1994 – Joe Elliott of Def Leppard guested as a co-presenter with Tony Dortie

On Thursday 11 June 1992, BBC One screened England's Euro 92 0–0 draw with Denmark, so TOTP was shown on Saturday 13 June, broadcast at 5:30pm, and presented by Adrian Rose and Femi Oke.

== 1994: Return of the Radio 1 disc-jockeys ==
The presentation changes introduced in 1991 did not have the impact producers had hoped for, and by 1993 only Mark Franklin and Tony Dortie remained from the revamped team. Despite claiming nine million viewers in January 1992, the success of the revamp was short-lived, and by May 1992, less than 6.5 million were tuning in – a figure which remained fairly constant for the next eighteen months. Reasons for the sustained lack of popularity for the show ranged wildly from a general apathy towards the music that featured in the charts at this time, to claims that the graphics styled around the 'weathervane' idea were hard to read.

Dortie and Franklin presented the show individually in rotation until January 1994, when Ric Blaxill replaced Stanley Appel as executive producer. Blaxill had produced shows for Radio 1 and had survived the first wave of change under new station controller Matthew Bannister, which had seen many of the disc-jockeys deemed too old for the station to resign or be sacked. Of those presenters that survived Bannister's cull, Simon Mayo, Mark Goodier and Nicky Campbell, who had all presented TOTP prior to the 1991 revamp, were all reinstated as presenters from 3 February 1994. Also returning was Bruno Brookes, another stalwart of the pre-1991 presenting team, though he was fired from Radio 1 in a second wave of Bannister cullings in February 1995, and accordingly he left the Top of the Pops presenting roster in April.

Newer recruits to Radio 1, including Lisa I'Anson, Wendy Lloyd, Claire Sturgess and Jo Whiley, augmented the presenting line-up. Blaxill's ambition was to make the show seem like an event, and he wanted the presentation between each song to be as spontaneous as the music it was introducing. To do this, Blaxill introduced the 'golden microphone', and increasingly experimented with celebrity guest presenters, mainly drawn from the realms of comedy and sport, as well as pop stars who were not promoting a single that week, to introduce the show.

- Simon Mayo (1994–1995, plus 30 August 1996)
- Mark Goodier (1994–1995, plus 28 March 1996)
- Bruno Brookes (1994–1995)
- Nicky Campbell (1994–1997)
- Jo Whiley (1995–1998, plus 23 April and 14 May 2006) (with Steve Lamacq 1995–1996)
- Lisa I'Anson (1995–1996)

== 1994–1996: The golden mic – celebrity guest presenters ==
- 17 March 1994 – Robbie Williams and Mark Owen of Take That
- 7 April 1994 – Andi Peters
- 14 April 1994 – Meat Loaf
- 12 May 1994 – Jack Dee
- 19 May 1994 – Alice Cooper co-presented with Bruno Brookes
- 9 June 1994 – Vic Reeves and Bob Mortimer
- 16 June 1994 – Angus Deayton
- 7 July 1994 – Reg Presley of The Troggs co-presented with Mark Goodier
- 21 July 1994 – Julian Clary
- 25 August 1994 – Malcolm McLaren
- 1 September 1994 – Claire Sturgess
- 8 September 1994 – Brian Harvey and Tony Mortimer of East 17
- 29 September 1994 – Claire Sturgess
- 6 October 1994 – Steve Punt and Hugh Dennis
- 20 October 1994 – Jarvis Cocker of Pulp
- 3 November 1994 – Kylie Minogue
- 17 November 1994 – Michelle Gayle
- 1 December 1994 – Lily Savage
- 8 December 1994 – Neneh Cherry
- 15 December 1994 – Damon Albarn of Blur
- 22 December 1994 – Gary Glitter
- 25 December 1994 – Take That
- 5 January 1995 – Jack Dee
- 26 January 1995 – Eternal
- 2 February 1995 – Kylie Minogue
- 9 February 1995 – Gary Olsen
- 23 February 1995 – Peter Cunnah of D:Ream
- 2 March 1995 – Keith Allen
- 16 March 1995 – Lenny Henry
- 30 March 1995 – P.J. and Duncan
- 13 April 1995 – Phill Jupitus
- 27 April 1995 – Chris Evans
- 4 May 1995 – Whigfield
- 25 May 1995 – Stewart Lee and Richard Herring
- 15 June 1995 – Michelle Gayle
- 6 July 1995 – Wendy Lloyd
- 13 July 1995 – Dale Winton
- 20 July 1995 – Gayle Tuesday
- 27 July 1995 – Craig McLachlan
- 17 August 1995 – Wendy Lloyd
- 24 August 1995 – Jarvis Cocker
- 31 August 1995 – Dale Winton
- 7 September 1995 – Jo Brand and Mark Lamarr
- 14 September 1995 – Robbie Williams
- 5 October 1995 – Gareth Hale and Norman Pace
- 19 October 1995 – Stewart Lee and Richard Herring
- 2 November 1995 – Suggs
- 9 November 1995 – Lee Evans
- 16 November 1995 – Louise
- 30 November 1995 – Jack Dee
- 7 December 1995 – Gary Glitter
- 14 December 1995 – John Peel
- 21 December 1995 – Ronan Keating and Stephen Gately of Boyzone
- 25 December 1995 – Björk and Jack Dee
- 18 January 1996 – Alan Davies
- 25 January 1996 – Lulu
- 1 February 1996 – Lee Evans
- 8 February 1996 – Julian Cope
- 15 February 1996 – Justine Frischmann of Elastica
- 7 March 1996 – Louise Wener of Sleeper
- 14 March 1996 – MN8
- 4 April 1996 – Dale Winton
- 11 April 1996 – Andi Peters
- 18 April 1996 – Bear van Beers
- 25 April 1996 – Chris Eubank
- 2 May 1996 – Michelle Gayle
- 9 May 1996 – Bear van Beers
- 16 May 1996 – Ian Wright
- 23 May 1996 – Skin of Skunk Anansie
- 30 May 1996 – Jack Dee and Jeremy Hardy

On 13 June 1996, BBC One showed coverage of Switzerland vs Netherlands from Euro '96. Top of the Pops was accordingly moved from the Thursday to Friday, originally as a temporary move to incorporate the BBC's expansive portfolio of sport (as well as Euro '96, the 1996 Summer Olympic Games were also broadcast on the channel that summer), though it soon became clear that the move was permanent and, apart from a couple of one-off occasions on 25 June 1998 and 9 August 2001, TOTP never again returned to its original Thursday night slot.

- 14 June 1996 – Mark Owen
- 21 June 1996 – Julia Carling
- 28 June 1996 – Gina G
- 5 July 1996 – Mark Morrison
- 12 July 1996 – Bear van Beers
- 19 July 1996 – Keith Allen as 'Keithski'
- 2 August 1996 – Jas Mann of Babylon Zoo
- 9 August 1996 – Peter Andre
- 23 August 1996 – Bear van Beers
- 6 September 1996 – Julia Carling
- 13 September 1996 – Dennis Pennis
- 20 September 1996 – Tony Mortimer of East 17
- 27 September 1996 – Harry Hill
- 4 October 1996 – Tony Wright of Terrorvision
- 11 October 1996 – Bear van Beers
- 18 October 1996 – Nigel Kennedy
- 1 November 1996 – Julian Clary
- 8 November 1996 – Frankie Dettori
- 15 November 1996 – Charlie Higson, John Thomson, Paul Whitehouse and Mark Williams of The Fast Show
- 29 November 1996 – Ronan Keating and Stephen Gately
- 6 December 1996 – Gary Glitter
- 13 December 1996 – Ian Broudie of The Lightning Seeds
- 20 December 1996 – Shaun Ryder of Black Grape
- 25 December 1996 – Spice Girls, whose three performances were introduced by Robbie Williams, Mark Morrison and Gina G

== 1994: Top of the Pops 2 and the magazine ==
As the show entered its fourth decade, Blaxill exploited the strength of the TOTP brand by introducing a tie-in publication Top of the Pops magazine, first published in January 1995, and by launching a sister show, Top of the Pops 2. Originally featuring the best of the main show's studio performances from that week with tips for future hits, the 45-minute-long TOTP2 showcased for the first time the extensive performance archive initially through spotlights on particular artists and a rewind to a given year in music each week. Debuting on 17 September 1994 in a 5.15pm Saturday afternoon slot on BBC Two, Johnnie Walker provided voice-over introductions before the show began to draw solely on archive performances from 1997, when former TOTP host Steve Wright took over. TOTP2 moved to a midweek early-evening slot in 1998, retaining a Saturday afternoon repeat, and regularly became one of the most watched shows on the BBC's second channel. Following a revamp of BBC Two's early peak schedules in 2002, the 45-minute show was given over to two shows of twenty-five minutes, and shows began to select celebrity guest editors, such as Jack Dee, Phill Jupitus and Vic Reeves, to choose their own favourite performances from the archive. After being 'rested' in 2004, a reformatted show featuring two new studio performances per week returned for a final full series in 2006–7, to replace the axed main show. Mark Radcliffe replaced Wright as presenter in 2009.

- Johnnie Walker (1994–1997)
- Steve Wright (1997–2004, 2006–2007, 2008, 2009)
- Mark Radcliffe (2009–2017)

== 1997–2000: Into the new millennium ==
Ric Blaxill left in 1997, and the show was temporarily looked after by Mark Wells who continued his predecessor's policy of having rotating guest presenters. By this time, only Jo Whiley remained of the Radio 1 disc-jockeys introduced to the show by Blaxill, though Wells added Radio 1 Breakfast Show caretakers Mark Radcliffe and Marc Riley to the roster (although both Whiley and Radcliffe & Riley only appeared twice each between Blaxill's exit and the arrival of his permanent successor in June). With a background in 'serious' music broadcasting having worked on Channel 4's The Tube and The White Room, the new executive producer was Chris Cowey who stripped the show of the gimmicks bequeathed by its predecessors, increased the number of studio performances per week whilst reducing the reliance on music videos, and gradually built a new team of regular presenters with backgrounds in music television and radio to replace the celebrity guests. Alongside Whiley, who graduated from occasional host to lead presenter in June 1997, came Jayne Middlemiss and Zoe Ball. Middlemiss had presented music strand The O-Zone for Children's BBC since 1995, whilst Ball was given a full-time role after guest presenting in March 1997, and ahead of her posting as the host of Radio 1's coveted breakfast show in October. Fellow Radio 1 disc-jockeys Mary Anne Hobbs and Never Mind the Buzzcocks host Mark Lamarr were added to the team but were quickly dropped, though Jamie Theakston, co-host with Middlemiss on The O-Zone, and Ball on Live & Kicking arrived in January 1998 after guest presenting the previous October. All would continue to present The O-Zone and Live & Kicking concurrently with TOTP. Ball and Whiley departed in summer 1998 to be replaced by former Smash Hits editor Kate Thornton who established herself with Middlemiss and Theakston as lead presenters by autumn 1998. A revamp in May 1998 which included a change of title sequence, logo and theme music also saw a shift in focus from the Top 40 to the Top 20, with the chart rundown, now voiced every week by Radio 1 Chart Show host and former TOTP presenter Mark Goodier, extended from the Top 10 to Top 20. Children's television presenter and model Gail Porter and Radio 1 disc-jockey Scott Mills augmented the line-up from March 1999, and though Mills left in August, Porter continued with Middlemiss and Theakston as lead presenters into the new millennium.

- Jo Whiley (1995–1998, plus 23 April and 14 May 2006)
- Jayne Middlemiss (1997–2001)
- Zoe Ball (1997–1998, 19 October 2001)
- Jamie Theakston (3 October 1997, 1998–2002, 2003)
- Kate Thornton (1998–1999)
- Gail Porter (1999–2001)
- Scott Mills (1999)

== 1997: More celebrity guest presenters ==
- 17 January 1997 – Rhona Cameron
- 24 January 1997 – Phil Daniels
- 31 January 1997 – Noddy Holder
- 7 February 1997 – Ardal O'Hanlon
- 14 February 1997 – Peter Andre
- 21 February 1997 – Ant and Dec
- 28 February 1997 – Ian Wright
- 14 March 1997 – Ian Broudie
- 21 March 1997 – Kylie Minogue
- 28 March 1997 – Zoe Ball
- 4 April 1997 – Mark and Lard (Mark Radcliffe and Marc Riley)
- 11 April 1997 – Mark Owen
- 18 April 1997 – Louise
- 25 April 1997 – Dannii Minogue
- 2 May 1997 – Cathy Dennis
- 16 May 1997 – Dannii Minogue
- 23 May 1997 – Mark and Lard
- 30 May 1997 – Spice Girls
- 1 August 1997 – Mary Anne Hobbs
- 8 August 1997 – Phill Jupitus
- 15 August 1997 – Denise van Outen
- 22 August 1997 – Sarah Cawood
- 12 September 1997 – Mark Lamarr
- 10 October 1997 – Mark Lamarr
- 31 October 1997 – Mary Anne Hobbs
- 28 November 1997 – Mark Lamarr
- 13 November 1998 – Katy Hill
- 17 September 1999 – Emma Ledden
- TOTP toured the country between 26 August (a rare Thursday show, broadcast on BBC Two) and 15 October 1999. These shows were broadcast from different cities' nightclubs, in order: The Revolution, Edinburgh; Event II, Brighton; Club Wow, Sheffield; L2, Liverpool; Ikon, Newcastle-upon-Tyne; Dome II, Birmingham Black Orchid (Nottingham) and Time & Icon, Swansea
- Former presenter Mark Goodier returned to voice the Top twenty countdown between 1997 and 2002. At the beginning of 2003, he was temporarily replaced by Scott Mills. Wes Butters voiced the countdown from February to November 2003.

== 2000–2003: Developing the brand ==
Richard Blackwood became joint lead presenter in August 2000 and presented in rotation with Jayne Middlemiss, Jamie Theakston and Gail Porter. At the end of August 2001, Middlemiss left the presenting roster. Josie D'Arby, who had hosted an episode in October 2000, made a short-lived return in August 2001, but joined Gail Porter in exiting before the end of the year, leaving Jamie Theakston as lead presenter until March 2002, when he was replaced by new recruits, model Lisa Snowdon and former TOTP guest presenter Sarah Cawood. Liz Bonnin joined the team from Channel 4 breakfast show RI:SE in May, and the majority of shows throughout 2002 were presented by these three presenters, with Theakston only returning for sporadic appearances, and again on a couple of occasions in 2003.

After the 2000th edition on 13 September 2002, the presenting team continued to rotate solely between Liz Bonnin, Lisa Snowdon, Sarah Cawood, alongside the returning Richard Blackwood, until the new year. Blackwood's final show came on Christmas Day 2002, but the three women continued to present through 2003, along with an increasing number of occasional presenters drawn mainly from breakfast television and Radio 1. Colin Murray and Edith Bowman joined their former RI:SE teammate Liz Bonnin in mid-2003 and, though both were used sparingly, Bowman would return as relief presenter in 2006. Konnie Huq also presented three shows, concurrent with her role as Blue Peter presenter in 2003. More successful was Huq's former Blue Peter colleague and The Big Breakfast host Richard Bacon, who joined the presenting roster in January 2003, graduating to lead presenter by September. Along with newcomers and former children's television hosts Margherita Taylor, Fearne Cotton and Reggie Yates, this quartet presented in rotating pairs until another revamp of TOTP took place in November 2003.

- Jo Whiley (1997–1998)
- Jayne Middlemiss (1997–2001)
- Jamie Theakston (1997–2002, 2003)
- Gail Porter (1999–2001, plus 2 May 2003)
- Richard Blackwood (2000–2002)
- Josie D'Arby (6 October 2000, 2001)
- Sarah Cawood (2002–2003, plus 30 July 2006)
- Lisa Snowdon (2002–2003)
- Liz Bonnin (2002–2003)
- Richard Bacon (2003, 2005–2006)
- Colin Murray (2003)
- Edith Bowman (2003, 2006)
- Margherita Taylor (2003, plus 15 April 2005)
- Konnie Huq (2003)
- Fearne Cotton (2003, 2004–2020)
- Reggie Yates (2003, 2004–2016)

Guest appearances:

- 14 April 2000 – Sara Cox
- 29 May 2000 – Chris Moyles co-presented a special Bank Holiday Monday edition from Sheffield Arena as part of BBC Music Live alongside Jamie Theakston
- 24 December 2000 – CBBC presenter Adrian Dickson hosted the Tweenies special
- 25 December 2000 – Sara Cox co-hosted with Jamie Theakston and Richard Blackwood
- 9 August 2001 – Sophie Ellis-Bextor, a show which was moved to Thursday
- 19 October 2001 – Zoe Ball and Jimmy Savile returned to present a show heralding the return to BBC Television Centre after ten years of recording at Elstree, with Jamie Theakston and Dermot O'Leary
- 16 November 2001 – Vernon Kay
- 25 December 2001 – Sara Cox co-hosted with Jamie Theakston
- 8 February 2002 – Dermot O'Leary
- 19 April 2002 – Mel B
- 7 March 2003 – Ben Elton
- 27 June 2003 – Jonathan Ross co-presented with Fearne Cotton
- 15 August 2003 – Jack Osbourne co-presented with Edith Bowman
- 7 November 2003 – Ronan Keating co-hosted with Fearne Cotton, almost eight years after last appearing as a mid-'90s guest presenter

== 2002–2006: Top of the Pops Saturday ==
In September 2002, in an attempt to combat the increasing ratings success of ITV's rival chart show CD:UK, the Top of the Pops brand diversified and a children's television spin-off was created to run alongside the main show. Top of the Pops Saturday began on 21 September 2002 as a segment to fill the final 45 minutes of the BBC One Saturday morning kids programme The Saturday Show, presented by Fearne Cotton, who would graduate to presenting the main show from 2003. For the first season, Cotton co-presented with Simon Grant. Cotton alone continued to present the show after The Saturday Show ended its second season in 2003, with TOTP Saturday gaining its own stand-alone slot on BBC One at 11.00am, immediately following The Saturday Show's replacement Dick & Dom in da Bungalow. Following the removal of Saturday morning children's television from BBC One to BBC Two in 2005, the show was renamed Top of the Pops: Reloaded from 17 September until its end in March 2006. For this final season, Cotton was joined by former Pop Idol contestants Sam and Mark and Radio 1 disc-jockeys Jason King and Joel Ross as co-presenters. The final show was shown on 25 March 2006.

- Fearne Cotton (all episodes 2002–2006, plus the main TOTP show: 2003, 2004–2020)
- Simon Grant (2002–2003)
- Sam Nixon (2005–2006)
- Mark Rhodes (2005–2006)
- Jason King (2005–2006)
- Joel Ross (2005–2006)

== 2003: All New Top of the Pops revamp ==
In 2003, former Top of the Pops presenter Andi Peters became new executive producer and began another radical overhaul. The first edition of All New Top of the Pops was broadcast on 28 November 2003, presented live by former MTV video jockey Tim Kash. The ratings for the first show were 5.65m. Kash presented shows alone until 30 April 2004, after which he began to present with previous presenters Fearne Cotton and/or Reggie Yates, who eventually began to present shows together without Kash. After presenting 14 February 2003 episode, Cotton became a more prominent presenter from June 2003, with Yates also joining the presenting roster in August. Both continued to present regularly until the November 2003 revamp. Kash left to rejoin MTV, making his last appearance in August 2004, allowing Cotton and Yates to present alone. For three shows in October and November 2004, Radio 1 Breakfast Show host Chris Moyles was drafted in to co-host alongside Cotton and Yates, and this trio also fronted the last show of 2004 before Christmas in a show styled as a Radio 1 Christmas party.

In 2003, Tim Kash became only the third presenter, after Jimmy Savile in 1971 and Noel Edmonds in 1978, to host Christmas Top of the Pops solo.

- Tim Kash (2003–2004)
- Fearne Cotton (2004–2020)
- Reggie Yates (2004–2016)
- Chris Moyles (2004, plus 29 May 2000, 22 April 2005 and 14 May 2006)

Only two shows between April 2004 and March 2006 did not feature either Fearne Cotton or Reggie Yates:

- 15 April 2005 – Richard Bacon and Margherita Taylor returned as relief presenters to host, eighteen months after their last show together.
- 22 April 2005 – Chris Moyles and his Radio 1 breakfast show colleagues, Aled Haydn Jones, Rachel Jones and Dave Vitty were guest presenters.

== 2005–2006: The move to BBC Two and the end – return of guest presenters ==
In November 2004, it was announced that Top of the Pops would move from its primetime slot on Friday nights on BBC One to a new Sunday night slot on BBC Two, a move largely viewed as the last sidelining of the show before inevitable cancellation. The move was initially intended to take place in Spring 2005 and an 'extended format' was promised but the show remained on BBC One until July 2005 with the final Friday show on 8 July followed by another episode the following Monday. The first BBC Two show ran for 35 minutes, five minutes longer than the BBC One show, and aired live on Sunday 17 July 2005 at 7pm, immediately after the announcement of the new week's chart and incorporated elements of TOTP2, which had been rested a year previously, by showing two archive performances alongside the new music. However, viewing figures halved within a fortnight of the new scheduling, from an average of 2.4 million viewers on BBC One to around 1.5 million on BBC Two. The ratings never improved, despite the show going on location to the 2006 Winter Olympics and Radio 1's One Big Weekend, and on 20 June 2006 the BBC announced that Top of the Pops was being axed due to no longer being able to compete with 24-hour cable music channels, with the final episode airing on 30 July 2006.

New executive producer Mark Cooper oversaw a return to the use of guest presenters, a full list of which is given below, but unlike in the '90s, this time the celebrities were paired with one of the already established lead presenting team of Fearne Cotton, Reggie Yates, and newcomer comedian Rufus Hound. The three lead presenters appeared on all of the BBC Two shows between them and when not joined by a celebrity co-host they presented in pairs with each other or with one of the secondary presenting team of Richard Bacon and, from January 2006, Edith Bowman. Occasionally, the show was moved from Sunday nights but remained a live broadcast, as was the case on the following Mondays: 15 August 2005, 16 January 2006 and the five shows between 13 February and 13 March 2006. The show was also once transmitted on a Tuesday: 11 July 2006.

In May 2006, BBC staff were asked to form the audience for several Top of the Pops shows after it emerged that the BBC did not have a premises licence for hosting public entertainment events at Television Centre.

Lead presenters:

- Fearne Cotton (2004–2020)
- Reggie Yates (2004–2016)
- Rufus Hound (2005–2006)

Relief presenters:

- Richard Bacon (2005–2006)
- Edith Bowman (2006)

Guest presenters:

- 17 July 2005 – Phill Jupitus
- 24 July 2005 – Jeremy Clarkson
- 31 July 2005 – Christian O'Connell
- 15 August 2005 – Phil Tufnell
- 28 August 2005 – Lulu
- 4 September 2005 – Phill Jupitus
- 11 September 2005 – Suggs
- 2 October 2005 – Jeremy Bowen
- 9 October 2005 – Richard Hammond
- 16 October 2005 – Phill Jupitus
- 6 November 2005 – Anastacia
- 13 November 2005 – Sharon Osbourne
- 27 November 2005 – Noddy Holder
- 18 December 2005 – Justin Lee Collins (1.89m viewers)
- 25 December 2005 – Shane Richie
- 16 January 2006 – Peter Kay as Brian Potter from Phoenix Nights
- 29 January 2006 – James May
- 13 February 2006 – Sue Barker and Colin Jackson, from the 2006 Winter Olympics in Turin
- 27 February 2006 – Jocelyn Brown and Matt Allwright
- 13 March 2006 – Cyndi Lauper
- 19 March 2006 – Trevor Nelson
- 26 March 2006 – Jo Brand
- 2 April 2006 – Trevor Nelson
- 23 April 2006 – Jo Whiley
- 7 May 2006 – Trevor Nelson
- 14 May 2006 – Vernon Kay, Chris Moyles and Jo Whiley, as part of Radio 1's One Big Weekend in Dundee
- 21 May 2006 – Diarmuid Gavin
- 28 May 2006 – Preston of The Ordinary Boys
- 4 June 2006 – Spoony
- 18 June 2006 – Annie Mac
- 11 July 2006 – Annie Mac – from T in the Park
- 30 July 2006 – Jimmy Savile, Tony Blackburn, Dave Lee Travis, Mike Read, Pat Sharp, Janice Long, Sarah Cawood, Edith Bowman, Reggie Yates, Rufus Hound – an assortment of presenters past and present return for the last weekly show. Fearne Cotton, who was unavailable, also presented a brief pre-recorded segment from Fiji (3.98m viewers)

== 2006–2022: After the end: Occasional events-led returns ==
=== Top of the Pops 2 ===
After being taken off the air in 2004, sister show Top of the Pops 2 was resurrected for a new run on Saturday nights at 8pm which reverted to the old format of mixing archive clips with new studio performances. The new series began two months after the original show ended, on Saturday 30 September 2006, with new studio performances provided by Nelly Furtado and Razorlight and a Top 10 chart rundown. All the episodes in this series followed the familiar TOTP2 presentation of no on-screen presentation, but rather a voiceover from Steve Wright:

- 30 September 2006 – Steve Wright (voice only); Razorlight: America and Nelly Furtado: Promiscuous
- 7 October 2006 – Steve Wright (voice only); Richard Hawley: Just Like The Rain and Jamelia: Something About You
- 14 October 2006 – Steve Wright (voice only); Nerina Pallot: Sophia and Seth Lakeman: The White Hare
- 21 October 2006 – Steve Wright (voice only); Amy Winehouse: Rehab
- 28 October 2006 – Steve Wright (voice only); Vincent Vincent and the Villains: Johnny Two Bands
- 4 November 2006 – Steve Wright (voice only); All Saints: Rock Steady and Gnarls Barkley: Who Cares
- 11 November 2006 – Steve Wright (voice only); Emma Bunton: Downtown and Ray Lamontagne: How Come
- 18 November 2006 – Steve Wright (voice only); Sandi Thom: Lonely Girl and Tony Bennett: Lullaby of Broadway
- 25 November 2006 – Steve Wright (voice only); Damien Rice: 9 Crimes
- 2 December 2006 – Steve Wright (voice only); The Fratellis: Whistle for the Choir
- 9 December 2006 – Steve Wright (voice only); Lil Chris: Gettin' Enough and Lily Allen: Littlest Things
- 16 December 2006 – Steve Wright (voice only); Kasabian: Empire
- 6 January 2007 – Steve Wright (voice only); Muse: Starlight
- 13 January 2007 – Steve Wright (voice only); Just Jack: Starz in their Eyes
- 20 January 2007 – Steve Wright (voice only); Regina Spektor: Fidelity
- 3 February 2007 – Steve Wright (voice only); Simon Webbe: My Soul Pleads For You, Duke Special: Freewheel and Kaiser Chiefs: Ruby
- 10 February 2007 – Steve Wright (voice only); The Feeling: Rose, Louise Setara: Wrong Again and Findlay Brown: Come Here
- 17 February 2007 – Steve Wright (voice only); Jack Savoretti: Dreamers and James Hunter: No Smoke Without Fire
- 24 February 2007 – Steve Wright (voice only); The View: Same Jeans and Corinne Bailey Rae: I'd Like To
- 3 March 2007 – Steve Wright (voice only); Madness: Sorry
- 10 March 2007 – Steve Wright (voice only); Westlife: Total Eclipse of The Heart and Maximo Park: Our Velocity
- 17 March 2007 – Steve Wright (voice only); Good Charlotte: The River, Lemar: Tick Tock and Muse: Invincible
- 24 March 2007 – Steve Wright (voice only); Kaiser Chiefs: The Angry Mob

Following the 2006–7 run, TOTP2 returned only to mark one-off special occasions and dropped the new performances. Such shows were dedicated to certain musicians such as Wham! and Duran Duran in 2010, as well as the death of Michael Jackson in 2009, or marked special occasions such as Christmas and New Year in 2008 and 2009, or tie-ins with a particular season of BBC programmes such as the School season which featured a back-to-school special to mark the end of the 2010 summer holidays, and an '80s-themed show to mark the final series of BBC television drama Ashes to Ashes, also in 2010.

=== Continued TOTP ===
As well as the intermittent broadcasts of TOTP2 on BBC Two and a yearly Christmas Day show which remained on BBC One until 2022, Top of the Pops is survived by occasional 'event-led' broadcasts. It has twice returned for special shows for the BBC's biennial Comic Relief charity fundraiser in 2007 and 2009, with the following presenters:

- 16 March 2007 – Jeremy Clarkson, Richard Hammond and James May – Top Gear of the Pops for Comic Relief 2007
- 13 March 2009 – Fearne Cotton, Reggie Yates, Noel Fielding, French and Saunders, Davina McCall, Jonathan Ross, David Tennant and Claudia Winkleman – Comic Relief does Top of the Pops

From 2006 to 2021, an annual BBC One show which looks back at the previous year in music also appears each Christmas Day originally broadcast at 2pm but in later years at around 12pm. In 2009 and from 2012 to 2021, a second festive episode has followed on or around New Year's Eve with a New Year's Eve party theme:

- 25 December 2006 – Fearne Cotton, Reggie Yates and Edith Bowman
- 25 December 2007 – Fearne Cotton and Reggie Yates
- 25 December 2008 – Fearne Cotton and Reggie Yates
- 31 December 2008 – Fearne Cotton and Reggie Yates
- 25 December 2009 – Fearne Cotton and Reggie Yates
- 31 December 2009 – Fearne Cotton and Reggie Yates
- 25 December 2010 – Fearne Cotton and Reggie Yates
- 25 December 2011 – Fearne Cotton and Reggie Yates
- 25 December 2012 – Fearne Cotton and Reggie Yates
- 31 December 2012 – Fearne Cotton and Reggie Yates
- 25 December 2013 – Fearne Cotton and Reggie Yates
- 31 December 2013 – Fearne Cotton and Reggie Yates
- 25 December 2014 – Fearne Cotton and Reggie Yates
- 31 December 2014 – Fearne Cotton and Reggie Yates
- 25 December 2015 – Fearne Cotton and Reggie Yates
- 1 January 2016 – Fearne Cotton and Reggie Yates
- 25 December 2016 – Fearne Cotton and Reggie Yates
- 31 December 2016 – Fearne Cotton and Reggie Yates
- 25 December 2017 – Fearne Cotton and Clara Amfo
- 31 December 2017 – Fearne Cotton and Clara Amfo
- 25 December 2018 – Fearne Cotton and Clara Amfo
- 28 December 2018 – Fearne Cotton and Clara Amfo
- 25 December 2019 – Fearne Cotton and Clara Amfo
- 30 December 2019 – Fearne Cotton and Clara Amfo
- 25 December 2020 – Fearne Cotton and Clara Amfo
- 31 December 2020 – Fearne Cotton and Clara Amfo
- 25 December 2021 – Clara Amfo and Jordan North
- 31 December 2021 – Clara Amfo and Jordan North

The festival specials did not return in 2022, and were replaced by an end-of-year review show on BBC Two:

- 24 December 2022 – Clara Amfo and Jack Saunders
- 28 December 2023 – Clara Amfo
- 27 December 2024 – Clara Amfo
- 31 December 2025 – Clara Amfo

== Total list ==
Note: Presenters are only added into the list of their debut decade, and "Total episodes" indicates the number of appearances throughout their hosting career, not just in that decade. E.g. Jimmy Savile began hosting TOTP in the 1960s, hosted over 280 episodes including episodes from the 60s onwards, so his name is in the "1960s" sub-section and all his episodes (including 1970s, 80s, and 2000s) are in his total episodes.

=== 1960s ===
Name	Total episodes	Debut episode	Last episode	Years	Ref(s)
Jimmy Savile	280	1 January 1964	30 July 2006	1964–1984, 1988, 2001, 2006	
Alan Freeman	93	1 January 1964	31 December 1988	1964–1969, 1981, 1988	
Pete Murray	102	8 January 1964	31 December 1988	1964–1969, 1981, 1988	
David Jacobs	46	8 January 1964	31 December 1988	1964–1966, 1981, 1983, 1988	
Simon Dee	8	6 October 1966	23 March 1967	1966–1967	
Tony Blackburn	146	19 October 1967	30 July 2006	1967, 1969–1979, 1981–1983, 1988, 2006	
Stuart Henry	19	26 October 1967	27 March 1969	1967–1969	
Kenny Everett	9	2 November 1967	31 December 1988	1967, 1973, 1988	
Emperor Rosko	3	16 November 1967	10 April 1975	1967, 1974–1975	
Mike Raven	1	23 November 1967	23 November 1967	1967	
Chris Denning	2	7 December 1967	22 February 1968	1967–1968	
Mike Lennox	1	14 December 1967	14 December 1967	1967	
Keith Skues	1	21 December 1967	21 December 1967	1967	
Dave Cash	4	11 January 1968	28 March 1968	1968	
Peter Tork	1	14 January 1968	14 January 1968	1968	
David Symonds	3	18 January 1968	9 May 1968	1968	
Ed Stewart	31	25 January 1968	29 September 1977	1968, 1971–1972, 1975–1977	
John Peel	50	1 February 1968	14 December 1995	1968, 1981–1987, 1995	
Tom Edwards	1	14 March 1968	14 March 1968	1968	
Alan Price	1	2 May 1968	2 May 1968	1968	
Micky Dolenz	1	23 May 1968	23 May 1968	1968	
Davy Jones	1	6 June 1968	9 June 1968	1968	

=== 1970s ===
Name	Total episodes	Debut episode	Last episode	Years	Ref(s)
Noel Edmonds	74	20 July 1972	5 May 1983	1972–1978, 1983	
Dave Lee Travis	105	8 November 1973	30 July 2006	1973–1984, 2006	
Johnnie Walker	1	10 January 1974	10 January 1974	1974	
Greg Edwards	3	7 March 1974	18 April 1974	1974	
Paul Burnett	9	30 May 1974	30 September 1982	1974, 1976–1979, 1981–1982	
David Hamilton	13	22 January 1976	31 December 1988	1976–1977, 1988	
David Jensen	70	18 November 1976	31 December 1988	1976–1984, 1988	
Peter Powell	114	3 November 1977 (Note: Powell first apperared at the end of the 20 and 27 October 1977 episodes.)	31 December 1988	1977–1988	
Elton John	2	15 December 1977	7 August 1980	1977, 1980	
Mike Read	66	9 November 1978 (Note: Read first apperared at the end of the 2 November 1978 episode.)	30 July 2006	1978–1989, 2006	
Andy Peebles	15	11 October 1979 (Note: Peebles first apperared at the end of the 4 October 1979 episode.)	20 September 1984	1979, 1981–1984	
Simon Bates	78	6 December 1979	31 December 1988	1979–1988	

=== 1980s ===
Name	Total episodes	Debut episode	Last episode	Years	Ref(s)
Steve Wright	56	7 February 1980 (Note: Wright first apperared on the 31 January 1980 episode.)	5 October 1989	1980–1989	
Tommy Vance	24	1 May 1980	22 November 1984	1980–1984	
BA Robertson	2	9 July 1980	28 August 1980	1980	
Roger Daltrey	1	14 August 1980	14 August 1980	1980	
Cliff Richard	1	28 August 1980	28 August 1980	1980	
Kevin Keegan	1	4 September 1980	4 September 1980	1980	
Richard Skinner	41	11 September 1980	19 January 1989	1980–1985, 1988–1989	
Olivia Newton-John	1	18 September 1980	18 September 1980	1980	
Russ Abbot	1	25 September 1980	25 September 1980	1980	
Colin Berry	1	30 October 1980	30 October 1980	1980	
Adrian Juste	2	25 December 1981	30 September 1982	1981–1982	
Paul Gambaccini	5	25 December 1981	25 December 1989	1981–1983, 1988–1989	
Garth Crooks	1	25 March 1982	25 March 1982	1982	
Adrian John	3	30 September 1982	5 May 1988	1982–1983, 1988	
Alexis Korner	1	30 September 1982	30 September 1982	1982	
Annie Nightingale	1	30 September 1982	30 September 1982	1982	
Mike Smith	69	30 September 1982	31 March 1988	1982–1988	
Jonathan King	4	30 September 1982	25 December 1985	1982–1983, 1985	
Pat Sharp	6	30 December 1982 (Note: Davies, Long and Sharp first apperared on the 2 December 1982 episode.)	30 July 2006	1982–1983, 2006	
Gary Davies	116	30 December 1982	26 September 1991	1982–1991	
Janice Long	61	30 December 1982	30 July 2006	1982–1988, 2006	
Bruno Brookes	49	13 September 1984 (Note: Brookes first apperared at the end of the 6 September 1984 episode.)	6 April 1995	1984–1986, 1988–1991, 1994–1995	
Lenny Henry	4	27 December 1984	16 March 1995	1984, 1989, 1991, 1995	
Dixie Peach	10	13 June 1985	24 April 1986	1985–1986	
Paul Jordan	6	3 October 1985	27 February 1986	1985–1986	
Simon Mayo	55	9 October 1986 (Note: Mayo first apperared on the 20 March 1986 episode.)	30 August 1996	1986–1991, 1994–1996	
Nicky Campbell	41	18 February 1988 (Note: Campbell first apperared at the end of the 1 October 1987 episode.)	10 January 1997	1988–1991, 1994–1997	
Mark Goodier	48	25 February 1988	28 March 1996	1988–1991, 1994–1996	
Andy Crane	10	21 July 1988	2 November 1989	1988–1989	
Liz Kershaw	1	11 August 1988	11 August 1988	1988	
Caron Keating	2	20 October 1988	8 December 1988	1988	
Anthea Turner	23	27 October 1988	30 May 1991	1988–1991	
Sybil Ruscoe	7	10 November 1988	28 September 1989	1988–1989	
Susie Mathis	2	17 November 1988	23 February 1989	1988–1989	
Hale and Pace	2	9 March 1989	5 October 1995	1989, 1995	
Rod McKenzie	1	16 March 1989	16 March 1989	1989	
Jenny Powell	4	4 May 1989	23 November 1989	1989	
Simon Parkin	2	15 June 1989	27 July 1989	1989	
Jackie Brambles	18	13 July 1989	6 September 1991	1989–1991	

=== 1990s ===
Name	Total episodes	Debut episode	Last episode	Years	Ref(s)
Tony Dortie	57	3 October 1991	20 January 1994	1991–1994	
Mark Franklin	59	3 October 1991	27 January 1994	1991–1994	
Elayne Smith	2	7 November 1991	5 December 1991	1991	
Claudia Simon	17	14 November 1991	1 October 1992	1991–1992	
Steve Anderson	5	21 November 1991	13 February 1992	1991–1992	
Adrian Rose	15	28 November 1991	17 September 1992	1991–1992	
Femi Oke	10	3 March 1992	17 September 1992	1992	
Paul Whitehouse	3	2 April 1992	15 November 1996	1992, 1994, 1996	
Harry Enfield	2	2 April 1992	4 January 1994	1992, 1994	
Bob Geldof	1	18 June 1992	18 June 1992	1992	
Sid Owen	1	25 December 1992	25 December 1992	1992	
Danniella Westbrook	1	25 December 1992	25 December 1992	1992	
Patsy Palmer	1	23 December 1993	23 December 1993	1993	
Joe Elliott	1	20 January 1994	20 January 1994	1994	
Robbie Williams	3	17 March 1994	14 September 1995	1994–1995	
Mark Owen	4	17 March 1994	11 April 1997	1994, 1996–1997	
Andi Peters	2	7 April 1994	11 April 1996	1994, 1996	
Alice Cooper	1	19 May 1994	19 May 1994	1994	
Vic Reeves	1	9 June 1994	9 June 1994	1994	
Bob Mortimer	1	9 June 1994	9 June 1994	1994	
Angus Deayton	1	16 June 1994	16 June 1994	1994	
Julian Clary	2	21 July 1994	1 November 1996	1994, 1996	
Malcolm McLaren	1	25 August 1994	25 August 1994	1994	
Claire Sturgess	2	1 September 1994	29 September 1994	1994	
Brian Harvey	1	8 September 1994	8 September 1994	1994	
Tony Mortimer	2	8 September 1994	20 September 1996	1994, 1996	
Steve Punt	1	6 October 1994	6 October 1994	1994	
Hugh Dennis	1	6 October 1994	6 October 1994	1994	
Jarvis Cocker	2	20 October 1994	24 August 1995	1994–1995	
Kylie Minogue	3	3 November 1994	21 March 1997	1994–1995, 1997	
Michelle Gayle	3	17 November 1994	2 May 1996	1994–1996	
Lily Savage	1	1 December 1994	1 December 1994	1994	
Neneh Cherry	1	8 December 1994	8 December 1994	1994	
Damon Albarn	1	15 December 1994	15 December 1994	1994	
Gary Glitter	3	22 December 1994	6 December 1996	1994–1996	
Howard Donald	1	25 December 1994	25 December 1994	1994	
Gary Barlow	1	25 December 1994	25 December 1994	1994	
Jason Orange	1	25 December 1994	25 December 1994	1994	
Gary Olsen	1	9 February 1995	9 February 1995	1995	
Peter Cunnah	1	23 February 1995	23 February 1995	1995	
Keith Allen	2	2 March 1995	19 July 1996	1995–1996	
Ant McPartlin	2	30 March 1995	21 February 1997	1995, 1997	
Declan Donnelly	2	30 March 1995	21 February 1997	1995, 1997	
Phill Jupitus	5	13 April 1995	16 October 2005	1995, 1997, 2005	
Chris Evans	1	27 April 1995	27 April 1995	1995	
Jack Dee	5	12 May 1995	30 May 1996	1995–1996	
Lisa I'Anson	5	18 May 1995 (Note: I'Anson first apperared on the 12 January 1995 episode.)	26 July 1996	1995–1996	
Stewart Lee	2	25 May 1995	19 October 1995	1995	
Richard Herring	2	25 May 1995	19 October 1995	1995	
Wendy Lloyd	2	6 July 1995	17 August 1995	1995	
Dale Winton	3	13 July 1995	4 April 1996	1995–1996	
Craig McLachlan	1	27 July 1995	27 July 1995	1995	
Mark Lamarr	4	7 September 1995	28 November 1997	1995, 1997	
Jo Brand	2	7 September 1995	26 March 2006	1995, 2006	
Steve Lamacq	4	28 September 1995	25 October 1996	1995–1996	
Jo Whiley	24	28 September 1995	14 May 2006	1995–1998, 2006	
Stephen Gately	2	21 December 1995	29 November 1996	1995–1996	
Lee Evans	2	9 November 1995	1 February 1996	1995–1996	
Louise Redknapp	2	16 November 1995	18 April 1997	1995, 1997	
Ronan Keating	3	21 December 1995	7 November 2003	1995–1996, 2003	
Alan Davies	1	18 January 1996	18 January 1996	1996	
Julian Cope	1	8 February 1996	8 February 1996	1996	
Justine Frischmann	1	15 February 1996	15 February 1996	1996	
Louise Wener	1	7 March 1996	7 March 1996	1996	
Beertje Van Beers	5	18 April 1996	11 October 1996	1996	
Chris Eubank	1	25 April 1996	25 April 1996	1996	
Ian Wright	2	16 May 1996	28 February 1997	1996–1997	
Jeremy Hardy	1	30 May 1996	30 May 1996	1996	
Julia Carling	2	21 June 1996	6 September 1996	1996	
Gina G	1	28 June 1996	28 June 1996	1996	
Mark Morrison	1	5 July 1996	5 July 1996	1996	
Jas Mann	1	2 August 1996	2 August 1996	1996	
Peter Andre	2	9 August 1996	14 February 1997	1996–1997	
Dennis Pennis	1	13 September 1996	13 September 1996	1996	
Harry Hill	1	27 September 1996	27 September 1996	1996	
Tony Wright	1	4 October 1996	4 October 1996	1996	
Nigel Kennedy	1	18 October 1996	18 October 1996	1996	
Frankie Dettori	1	8 November 1996	8 November 1996	1996	
Charlie Higson	1	15 November 1996	15 November 1996	1996	
John Thomson	1	15 November 1996	15 November 1996	1996	
Mark Williams	1	15 November 1996	15 November 1996	1996	
Ian Broudie	2	13 December 1996	14 March 1997	1996–1997	
Shaun Ryder	1	20 December 1996	20 December 1996	1996	
Rhona Cameron	1	17 January 1997	17 January 1997	1997	
Noddy Holder	2	31 January 1997	27 November 2005	1997, 2005	
Phil Daniels	1	24 January 1997	24 January 1997	1997	
Ardal O'Hanlon	1	7 February 1997	7 February 1997	1997	
Zoe Ball	11	28 March 1997	21 October 2001	1997–1998, 2001	
Mark Radcliffe	2	4 April 1997	23 May 1997	1997	
Marc Riley	2	4 April 1997	23 May 1997	1997	
Dannii Minogue	2	25 April 1997	16 May 1997	1997	
Cathy Dennis	1	2 May 1997	2 May 1997	1997	
Jayne Middlemiss	58	6 June 1997	31 August 2001	1997–2001	
Mary Anne Hobbs	2	1 August 1997	31 October 1997	1997	
Denise van Outen	1	15 August 1997	15 August 1997	1997	
Sarah Cawood	26	22 August 1997	30 July 2006	1997, 2002–2003, 2006	
Jamie Theakston	99	3 October 1997	25 April 2003	1997–2003	
Kate Thornton	10	3 July 1998	7 May 1999	1998–1999	
Katy Hill	1	13 November 1998	13 November 1998	1998	
Gail Porter	36	12 March 1999	2 May 2003	1999–2001, 2003	
Scott Mills	5	2 April 1999	20 August 1999	1999	
Emma Ledden	1	17 September 1999	17 September 1999	1999	

=== 2000s ===
Name	Total episodes	Debut episode	Last episode	Years	Ref(s)
Sara Cox	3	14 April 2000	25 December 2001	2000–2001	
Chris Moyles	7	29 May 2000	14 May 2006	2000, 2004–2006	
Richard Blackwood	19	4 August 2000	29 December 2002	2000–2002	
Josie d'Arby	4	6 October 2000	5 October 2001	2000–2001	
Sophie Ellis-Bextor	1	9 August 2001	9 August 2001	2001	
Dermot O'Leary	2	21 October 2001	8 February 2002	2001–2002	
Vernon Kay	2	16 November 2001	14 May 2006	2001, 2006	
Lisa Snowdon	14	29 March 2002	13 June 2003	2002–2003	
Melanie Blatt	1	19 April 2002	19 April 2002	2002	
Liz Bonnin	14	24 May 2002	19 September 2003	2002–2003	
Richard Bacon	23	17 January 2003	6 March 2006	2003, 2005–2006	
Fearne Cotton	132	14 February 2003	31 December 2020	2003–2020	
Ben Elton	1	7 March 2003	7 March 2003	2003	
Konnie Huq	3	23 May 2003	18 July 2003	2003	
Colin Murray	6	6 June 2003	29 August 2003	2003	
Edith Bowman	11	6 June 2003	25 December 2006	2003, 2006	
Jonathan Ross	1	27 June 2003	27 June 2003	2003	
Reggie Yates	86	8 August 2003	31 December 2016	2003–2016	
Jack Osbourne	1	15 August 2003	2003	2003	
Margherita Taylor	6	3 October 2003	15 April 2005	2003, 2005	
Tim Kash	37	28 November 2003	27 August 2004	2003–2004	
Aled Haydn Jones	1	22 April 2005	22 April 2005	2005	
Rachel Jones	1	22 April 2005	22 April 2005	2005	
David Vitty	1	22 April 2005	22 April 2005	2005	
Jeremy Clarkson	1	24 July 2005	24 July 2005	2005	
Christian O'Connell	1	31 July 2005	31 July 2005	2005	
Phil Tufnell	1	15 August 2005	15 August 2005	2005	
Rufus Hound	16	21 August 2005	30 July 2006	2005–2006	
Jeremy Bowen	1	2 October 2005	2 October 2005	2005	
Richard Hammond	1	9 October 2005	9 October 2005	2005	
Sharon Osbourne	1	13 November 2005	13 November 2005	2005	
Justin Lee Collins	1	18 December 2005	18 December 2005	2005	
Shane Richie	1	25 December 2005	25 December 2005	2005	
Peter Kay	1	16 January 2006	16 January 2006	2006	
James May	1	29 January 2006	29 January 2006	2006	
Colin Jackson	1	13 February 2006	13 February 2006	2006	
Sue Barker	1	13 February 2006	13 February 2006	2006	
Matt Allwright	1	27 February 2006	27 February 2006	2006	
Jocelyn Brown	1	27 February 2006	27 February 2006	2006	
Cyndi Lauper	1	13 March 2006	13 March 2006	2006	
Trevor Nelson	3	19 March 2006	7 May 2006	2006	
Diarmuid Gavin	1	21 May 2006	21 May 2006	2006	
Annie Mac	2	18 June 2006	11 July 2006	2006	
Noel Fielding	1	14 March 2009	14 March 2009	2009	

=== 2010s ===
Name	Total episodes	Debut episode	Last episode	Years	Ref(s)
Clara Amfo	14	25 December 2017	31 December 2025	2017–2025	

=== 2020s ===
Name	Total episodes	Debut episode	Last episode	Years	Ref(s)
Jordan North	2	25 December 2021	31 December 2021	2021	
Jack Saunders	1	24 December 2022	24 December 2022	2022	
