= Bruno Brookes =

British DJ and radio presenter

- Born: Trevor Neil Brookes; 24 April 1959 (age 66); Stoke-on-Trent, England
- Education: Seabridge Secondary School, Newcastle-under-Lyme
- Occupation: Disc jockey
- Years active: 1984-Present
- Known for: BBC Radio 1's UK Top 40 (1986–1990, 1992-95); CEO of Immedia (2000–2020)
- Spouse: Debbie Brooker (m. 1994; div. 2002)

Trevor Neil "Bruno" Brookes (born 1959 in Stoke-on-Trent, Staffordshire) is an English former radio presenter who became prominent on British radio in the 1980s. He was CEO of in-store radio company Immedia from 2000 to 2020.

== Early life and career ==
Brookes attended Bradwell and Seabridge secondary schools in Newcastle-under-Lyme. He became a disc jockey through youth club discos in his home town before he sent a successful audition tape created for him by George Wood (Judder) to his local station, BBC Radio Stoke.

== Radio One ==
He was recruited by BBC Radio 1, the national pop network, where he worked as a stand-in presenter before taking over the teatime show from Peter Powell in September 1984.

In addition to this show, Brookes presented a rundown of the UK Top 40 singles chart on Sunday evenings between March 1986 and September 1990, and again between March 1992 and April 1995.

In April 1989, Brookes moved to the weekend breakfast show, co-hosting with Liz Kershaw, taking over from Mark Goodier and also regularly deputised for Simon Mayo on the weekday breakfast show. Three years later, he moved to the weekday early breakfast slot, where he remained until he was dismissed in 1995 by Trevor Dann.

Brookes, along with another former chart show presenter Mark Goodier, returned to the station for a one-off Top 40 countdown show on Sunday 30 September 2007, providing new pre-recorded inserts into the show, which was hosted by the presenters Jason King and Joel Ross. This special show formed part of the station's celebrations of the 40th birthday of BBC Radio 1.

=== Acid house ===
Brookes was also an early supporter of the fledgling acid house scene by championing Stakker Humanoid, a November 1988 hit for Humanoid (AKA Brian Dougans). In a 2013 interview with The Guardian, Brookes said that he was given a white label of the record and immediately fell under its spell. "It just got to me. I remember listening to it and thinking it was one step ahead of everything techno that was coming out. It wasn't copying anything else; it was just fabulous." As a result, he played the record twice in one show – a very unusual step for a prime-time radio DJ.

=== "Killing in the Name" controversy ===
While presenting the Top 40, Brookes accidentally played the full uncensored version of "Killing in the Name" by Rage Against the Machine on 21 February 1993. The song contains 15 instances of the word "Fuck". Brookes was not made aware of the language in the track and, as a new entry, included it in the broadcast. Brookes and his producer, Simon Sadler, were preparing a trailer for the following week's show whilst the song played, so they were unaware of what was going out on air. The station immediately received 138 phone calls of complaint.

== Television work ==
During his period at Radio 1, Brookes was on the Top of the Pops host roster and also presented Beat the Teacher on BBC television, a children's quiz where pupils took on teachers in a general knowledge game based on noughts and crosses. He was the last of the show's three presenters, following Howard Stableford and ex-Manfred Mann singer Paul Jones. He also hosted the dating show Love at First Sight and the angling show Tight Lines on Sky.

He also appeared in the Brass Eye series, in which he read an appeal against the fictitious drug "cake".

== Immedia ==
Brookes founded the corporate communications company Immedia in 2000, a provider of in-store radio stations, including to HSBC, Ikea, and Topshop. The company was founded as Storm Radio, initially providing internet radio services, and was floated on the Alternative Investment Market in 2003. After May 2001, the stations removed human DJs and were automated and they closed in 2002 in favour of in-store stations. He resigned as CEO in May 2020.

== Personal life ==
Brookes was in a relationship for eight years with TV presenter Anthea Turner until the early 1990s, when she left him for fellow DJ Peter Powell. She later said he was abusive, which he said was an exaggeration. He married model Debbie Brooker in 1994, they resided in Newbury, but they separated in January 2002 and were divorced.

He received a 12-month driving ban in 1999 for drink driving. In May 2006, Brookes suffered a heart attack and was treated at St Thomas' Hospital, London where he was interviewed by Nadia Sawalha as a patient on BBC One's City Hospital. In the interview, he said he would try to give up smoking, which he acknowledged as the main reason for his illness.

Media offices
| Preceded by Richard Skinner | BBC Radio 1 chart show presenter 30 March 1986 – 23 September 1990 | Succeeded by Mark Goodier |
| Preceded by Tommy Vance | BBC Radio 1 chart show presenter 15 March 1992 – 16 April 1995 | Succeeded by Mark Goodier |
