= The Y Plan =

Exercise programme

The Y Plan is an exercise programme devised by Lesley Mowbray and Jill Gaskell for the London YMCA, and popular in the United Kingdom during the 1990s.

The programme is choreographed by producer Jane S. Linter and distributed by Virgin Media Group. Emphasising short but regular workouts without any specialist equipment, the first book based on the programme, titled The Y Plan, was published in 1990.

Television presenter Anthea Turner was the public face of The Y Plan, appearing alongside the creators in numerous books, VHS videos and magazine features. A further video was made, entitled Y-Plan countdown, in which one does an exercise regime of 36 days, with three levels of difficulty. A DVD of the plan was released by the YMCA in 2011.
