= UP2U =

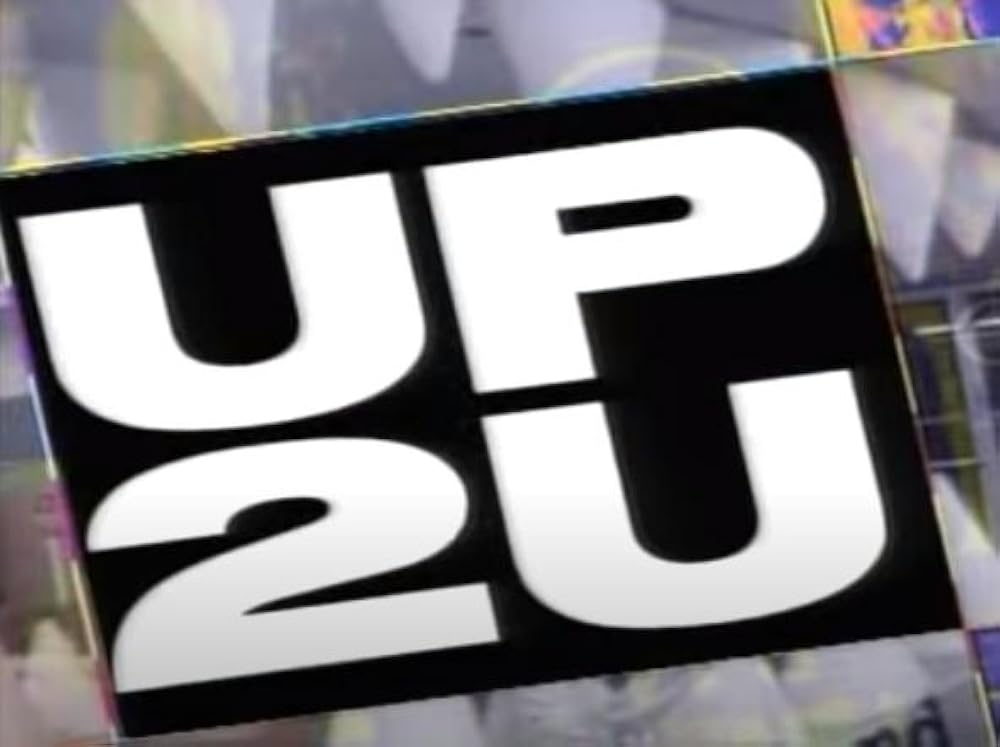
- Genre: Children's
- Presented by: Tony Dortie; Jenny Powell; Anthea Turner
- Country of origin: United Kingdom
- Original language: English
- No. of series: 2
- No. of episodes: 19

Production
- Running time: 115 minutes

Original release
- Network: BBC1
- Release: 16 July 1988 – 16 September 1989

UP2U is a British children's television series that aired on BBC1 from 16 July 1988 to 16 September 1989. The programme aired on Saturday mornings and was broadcast live from Manchester, the first series from a dedicated studio (at BBC Manchester) and the second from the programme's own production office.

The programme featured a mix of entertainment features, location reports, guest interviews and 'things-to-do' guides, with the title "UP2U" referring to the fact that, like in Blue Peter, viewers could write in to suggest subject matter for features and articles, and also vote by telephone during the live show for features, inserts and music videos to be shown.

Each week, two of the presenters would be in the studio/office presenting the bulk of the show, with the third on location providing reports linked into the show at various points.

During one of the location reports, from the Royal Tournament, Anthea Turner was injured when a pyrotechnic display exploded in her face whilst she was giving a piece to camera during a motorcycle stunt. The incident was broadcast live on-air and has more recently been uploaded onto video-sharing sites such as YouTube by those who had been recording the programme. The incident was later blamed on a miscommunication between programme staff and stunt organisers, coupled with an unplanned last-minute change in the location from which Turner gave her report.

== Transmissions ==
Series	Start date	End date	Episodes
1	16 July 1988	10 September 1988	9
2	15 July 1989	16 September 1989	10
