= Stuart Henry (DJ) =

Scottish DJ (1942–1995)

- Born: 24 February 1942; Edinburgh, Scotland
- Died: 24 November 1995 (aged 53); Luxembourg
- Occupations: Actor; Disc Jockey
- Years active: Early 1960s–1995
- Spouse: Ollie Henry (m. 1976)

Stuart Henry (24 February 1942 – 24 November 1995) was a Scottish disc jockey on pirate radio station Radio Scotland from January 1966 to August 1967. He then worked at BBC Radio 1 from its start in October 1967. Between 1967 and 1969 he was one of the regular presenters of BBC's Top of the Pops. He left the BBC in 1974 to join Radio Luxembourg.

== Biography ==
=== Early life and acting career ===
Born in Edinburgh, Henry attended Stewart's Melville College in the city, after which he trained at Glasgow College of Dramatic Art. His early acting career included appearances in Dr. Finlay's Casebook and Z-Cars, and in films such as the 1970 musical Toomorrow in which he played the part of the compere.

=== Pirate DJ work, Radio 1 and Radio Luxembourg ===
On 1 January 1966, he started in radio and became a pirate disc-jockey with Radio Scotland. Eighteen months later, he was in the first disc-jockey line-up for the new BBC station Radio 1. He presented a variety of shows on the station, including weekend shows under his own name as well as regular programmes in the station's schedule like Midday Spin, the Radio 1 Roadshow, some episodes of Sounds of the Seventies and a Sunday evening show called Noise at Nine

On his Radio 1 shows, he introduced a spot which enabled the broadcaster to find missing young people, which was named She's Leaving Home, after The Beatles's song She's Leaving Home, from their 1967 album Sgt. Pepper's Lonely Hearts Club Band. He would encourage young people to contact the station by telephone to make their parents aware that they were safe and well.

The opening theme music to his Radio 1 shows was Soul Finger, a 1967 track recorded by the Bar Kays. At the peak of his career with the station, in the early seventies, his show attracted audiences regularly in excess of 11 million.

Henry was a regular presenter on Top of the Pops. He presented a total of nineteen episodes between 1967 and 1969. The show was a victim to wiping, and as a result, only two episodes he presented (27 February 1969 and 20 March 1969) have been archived, but, three additional episodes hosted by Henry are known to exist in audio format.

In later years with Radio 1, he began to slur his speech, an early sign of multiple sclerosis, and he was eventually sacked in 1974, after which he went to work with Radio Luxembourg the following year. His speech deteriorated further until his wife, Ollie, began to assist with his presentations and newsreading. His show became known as The Stuart and Ollie Show. He remained at Radio Luxembourg for twelve years until 1987.

== Personal life and death ==
Henry married Ollie (1943–2020), a former model, in 1976. He suffered for many years with multiple sclerosis, the illness accounting for his later distinctive, rather halting speech delivery. Ollie dedicated the remaining years of their married life to care for him. She died on 12 August 2020, aged 77.

Stuart Henry died on 24 November 1995 in Luxembourg. On 2 December 2004, he was posthumously inducted into the Radio Academy Hall of Fame, honouring his outstanding contribution to UK radio.

== Filmography ==
Year	Title	Role	Notes
1970	Toomorrow	Compere	
1971	Danger Point	Driver	
