= Beat the Teacher =

British children's game show

- Genre: Children's Game show
- Created by: Clive Doig
- Presented by: Howard Stableford (1984); Paul Jones (1985–86); Bruno Brookes (1987–88)
- Theme music composer: Mike Batt (1984–86); Martin Cook (1987–88)
- Country of origin: United Kingdom
- Original language: English
- No. of series: 5
- No. of episodes: 164

Production
- Running time: 15 minutes

Original release
- Network: BBC1
- Release: 24 September 1984 – 27 October 1988

Beat the Teacher is a British children's game show that aired on BBC1 from 24 September 1984 to 27 October 1988. It was first hosted by Howard Stableford in 1984, then hosted by Paul Jones from 1985 to 1986 and finally Bruno Brookes from 1987 to 1988.

== Show format ==
Each edition featured two contestants; one a school student and the other a teacher. Both were tested on general knowledge questions and logic puzzles.

Correct answers won the contestant moves on a giant Noughts and Crosses board made from rotating cubes. Questions awarded one, two or three moves of the board, based upon their difficulty. Control of the board was determined by the use of buzzers. After answering the question correctly, the contestant was given the choice of which blocks on the board to turn over.

For example, if a square displayed a "nought", one rotation would see the square turn blank; two would see it replaced with a "cross", three with another blank and on the fourth turn it would revert to a "nought".

Tactical play would lead to the contestant building up lines of noughts or crosses, for which points were awarded (10 points per horizontal, vertical or diagonal line).

A special "joker card" could be played once in each game by either contestant, reversing each square on the board so that all crosses became noughts and vice versa. A bonus was awarded for a full board of noughts or crosses, after which each square on the board would be randomised.

Question styles generally included puzzles, "true or false," or "identify the picture". In later series, the last round played by both contestants before the winner was revealed was a "wrong answer" round, in which the aim was for each contestant to give as many incorrect answers as possible within 60 seconds.

The player with the highest score at the end would be crowned champion and participate in the "final" round. The board was cleared, and the winning contestant had to try to fill all nine squares up by answering nine questions correctly within 60 seconds. If they accomplished this, they would win a prize. Whether they won or not they were invited to come back again the next episode. A "Beat the Teacher" Failure Mug was the consolation prize awarded to a majority of the show's unsuccessful contestants.

Once a contestant won five games in a row, they would "retire" undefeated (although this rule was waived for the final series, which saw one contestant win thirteen episodes in a row before being defeated). The best four students and the best four teachers from each series in terms of total number of wins and then total scores achieved in their episodes (excluding the final round) would return for the quarter-finals at the end of the series

== Transmissions ==
Series	Start date	End date	Episodes
1	24 September 1984	9 November 1984	28
2	9 September 1985	8 November 1985	36
3	8 September 1986	7 November 1986	36
4	14 September 1987	12 November 1987	36
5	12 September 1988	27 October 1988	28
