= Rob Stringer =

Welsh record executive (born 1962)

Rob Stringer CBE
- Born: Robert Adrian Stringer; 13 August 1962 (age 64); Aylesbury, United Kingdom
- Education: Goldsmiths College
- Occupation: Record executive
- Years active: 1985–present
- Employer: Sony Music
- Predecessor: Doug Morris
- Board member of: Sony Group Corporation; Luton Town F.C.
- Spouse: Julia Carling (m. 2006)
- Children: 2
- Relatives: Howard Stringer (Brother)
- Website: sonymusic.com

Robert Adrian Stringer CBE (born 13 August 1962) is a British music industry executive. He has served as the chairman of Sony Music Group and CEO of Sony Music Entertainment since 2017. He is also a director of football club Luton Town F.C.

Stringer was listed Second on the 2022 Billboard "Power 100" ranking of persons influential in the music industry.

== Early life ==
Stringer was born and raised in the town of Aylesbury, Buckinghamshire, and attended Aylesbury Grammar School. He got his first record player at age seven and attended his first concert at age 12 at Wembley Arena where the line up included the Beach Boys and the Eagles.

Growing up in Aylesbury, Stringer had the opportunity to see a number of touring bands. In 1976, at the age of 14, he saw the Clash at one of their earliest shows. He went on to spend his teenage years watching punk bands at the Aylesbury rock venue, Friars, where he began working during school holidays. He later said that while he "saw the cultural side" of the club, "the business side rubbed off on me too.”

After leaving school, Stringer studied sociology at Goldsmiths College in South London. Whilst at university, he spent a year working as a student entertainment manager, booking acts such as Simply Red.

== Career (1985–2017) ==
During school holidays, Stringer visited his brother Howard in New York, then the president of the CBS network. He assisted with CBS television coverage at the Republican and Democrat conventions in the 1980 and 1984 elections.

In 1985, Stringer joined CBS Records as a graduate trainee. He was named managing director of Epic Records UK in 1992. He stepped down from the role to become chairman of Sony Music UK in 2001. Whilst at Sony, Stringer had a role in signing Welsh rockers the Manic Street Preachers, the first signing of his career. Stringer remained close to the band. He said: "I speak to all of them at least once a week and have done for 15 years. We've had lots of ups and downs." He also worked with artists including The Clash, Sade, George Michael, and Oasis.

Stringer then became Chairman of Columbia Records in the U.S. in 2008. His tenure included the release of 25 by Adele, Lemonade by Beyonce and Blackstar by David Bowie. Blackstar was Bowie's final album, which Stringer worked with him on personally.

== Sony Music Entertainment (2017–present) ==
After a decade at Columbia Records, Stringer became the CEO of Sony Music succeeding Doug Morris in April 2017.

In his first year as CEO, Stringer oversaw a 12.2% increase in recorded music (up to $4.03 billion). This included an improvement of streaming revenues, which went up 37.3% to $1.8 billion, and improvements in physical sales, which increased by just under $10 million.

In August 2019, Stringer was named as the Chairman of Sony Music Group, in addition to his role of CEO of Sony Music Entertainment.

He was reported to have "an artist-friendly reputation, working closely with modern icons including Adele, Beyoncé, Bob Dylan, Harry Styles, and many others".

In 2021, Stringer implemented the company's Artists Forward and Songwriters Forward programs to create more earnings opportunities for artists and songwriters.

In his role as chairman he is credited as driving the creation of a $100 million fund to "fight racism around the world".

== Honours ==
Stringer was named Music Visionary of the Year in 2013 by the UJA-Federation of New York's Music and was presented the award by Adele.

In 2014, he received the “Strat” Award for Outstanding Lifetime Achievement from Music Week.

Stringer received the 2016 Clive Davis Visionary Award from Billboard magazine.

In 2017, he received the Music Industry Trusts Award, which was presented by close friend Nicky Wire of the Manic Street Preachers.

He was appointed Commander of the Order of the British Empire (CBE) in the 2022 New Year Honours for services to UK creative industries, social justice and charity.

He was awarded the 2022 GRAMMY Salute To Industry Icons award.

Stringer appeared at #2 on the Billboard Power 100 in 2022 and again in 2023.

== Personal life ==
Stringer is married, has two children and lives in New York. Whilst he spends about three-quarters of the year in New York, he also makes regular trips to London and Los Angeles. He is a Luton Town supporter and is currently a director at the club.

Preceded by Doug Morris	Chairman & Chief Executive Officer of Sony Music Entertainment; April 2017–present	Succeeded by incumbent
