= Help Me Anthea, I'm Infested =

- Presented by: Anthea Turner, Mark Coltman
- Country of origin: United Kingdom
- Original language: English
- No. of seasons: 1
- No. of episodes: 3

Production
- Running time: 30 minutes
- Production company: RDF Television

Original release
- Network: BBC Three
- Release: 26 September – 10 October 2007

Help Me Anthea, I'm Infested is a 2007 factual entertainment television show produced by RDF Television for BBC Three, presented by Anthea Turner and Mark Coltman, a professional pest control expert. The presenters visit people whose houses have pest control problems, give them advice and help them to exterminate vermin.

Originally slated for six episodes, the BBC cut the series short after the third episode was broadcast. According to an interview with Anthea Turner, only the first three episodes were planned to be on bug infestations, although she did not specify what later episodes would cover.

Critical reactions were very negative: James Watson at the Daily Telegraph described it as being both boring and exhibiting "grinding, excruciating pointlessness", while The Guardian's Nancy Banks-Smith described it as "frightful". Charlie Brooker thought Turner came across as "a hard, judgemental piece of work who spends most of her time haranguing the human inhabitants for living in filth", and the resulting programme feels like "a strange psychodrama in which the punters are caught between unfeeling vermin on one side, and an unfeeling former Blue Peter presenter on the other". Jeremy Paxman used it as an example of the perceived low quality and lack of public value of BBC Three programmes in an interview with the BBC chairman, Sir Michael Lyons, on Newsnight along with My Man Boobs and Me, My Dog Is As Fat As Me, Freaky Eaters and Fat Men Can't Hunt. The novelist P.D. James listed it as one of the BBC's "most embarrassing programmes".

Rentokil Initial list the show as one of a small number of pest control-related television shows.

== See also ==
- Billy the Exterminator
