= Anthea Turner: Perfect Housewife =

- Genre: Reality
- Presented by: Anthea Turner
- Narrated by: Ella Kenion
- Theme music composer: Jody Jenkins
- Country of origin: United Kingdom
- Original language: English
- No. of series: 3
- No. of episodes: 25

Production
- Running time: 60 minutes
- Production company: RDF Television

Original release
- Network: BBC Three
- Release: 9 February 2006 – 25 July 2007

Anthea Turner: Perfect Housewife (also known as The Perfect Housewife with Anthea Turner) is a reality show that ran on BBC Three from 2006 to 2007 and is hosted by Anthea Turner. In each episode, two housewives are introduced who have difficulties running their home efficiently. Anthea helps them by giving tips in the art of housekeeping, homemaking and hostessing. After a two-week session their homes are revisited and one of the two contestants will be crowned as the Perfect Housewife.

== Reception ==
Critics generally considered Perfect Housewife "lightweight". Victor Lewis-Smith, writing in the Evening Standard, thought program was "desperate stuff", with most of the advice of given by Turner in the show being "irrelevant, outdated, or plain wrong", and that the scripts were "truly dreadful". Despite thinking it part of a trend of replacing feminism with confutation between women, Justine Picardie, of The Daily Telegraph, found as television, it was "strangely compelling viewing".

== Related books ==
- How to Be the Perfect Housewife: Lessons in the Art of Modern Household Management, Virgin Books (29 March 2007) (ISBN 0-7535-1285-8)
- How to Be the Perfect Housewife: Entertain in Style, Virgin Books (8 May 2008) (ISBN 0-7535-1332-3)
- The Perfect Christmas, Virgin Books (8 September 2008) (ISBN 1-9052-6441-0)
