= Grant Bovey =

British businessman and television personality (born 1961)

- Born: March 1961 (age 65); Nottingham, England
- Spouse(s): Della Chapman (m. 1991; div. 1998) Anthea Turner (m. 2000; div. 2015)
- Children: 3

Grant Michael Bovey (born March 1961 in Nottingham, England) is a British businessman and television personality.

== Career ==
Bovey was the CEO of Imagine Homes.

In 2002, Bovey took part in a charity boxing match against Ricky Gervais and lost on points after going three 90 second rounds.

Bovey was declared bankrupt in 2010.

In 2016, Bovey participated in the eighteenth series of Celebrity Big Brother and was the first contestant to be evicted.

== Personal life ==
Bovey married his first wife, Della Chapman, in 1991, with whom he had three daughters. Bovey was then married to Anthea Turner from 2000 to 2015.
