= Dixie Peach =

British radio DJ and musician

- Born: Bernie Michael
- Occupation: Radio DJ

Bernie Michael, known by the stage name Dixie Peach, is a British radio DJ and musician.

He was part of a UK funk band called Mirage before he started his broadcasting career.

Peach was one of the starting line-up on Radio Caroline when it re-launched on 20 August 1983. He used his backing singer skills to introduce songs - blending his voice into the song.

Peach joined BBC Radio 1 in 1984 presenting a Saturday evening show called Midnight Runner which specialised in American style rock and funk. He was the third black Radio DJ (after Al Matthews and Ranking Miss P) on Radio 1. On television, he hosted editions of Top of the Pops.

In 1987, he left Radio 1 and in 1991 joined CNFM where he hosted the morning show. He left the station in late 1992 and joined BFBS Radio where he presented Music Choice Europe. A keen music fan, Peach has recorded backing vocals on songs for Elton John and Hall & Oates.
