= Julia Carling =

British journalist and television presenter

Julia Stringer (née Smith; born 28 February 1965) is a British journalist and television presenter. She is the ex-wife of former England rugby captain Will Carling.

== Career ==
Her television credits include:

- VH1 UK (VJ)
- The Big Breakfast (Channel 4)
- Top of the Pops (BBC)
- This Morning (ITV)
- Celebrity Baby (Sky One)
- Top To Toe II (Carlton Midland, 2004)

She wrote a book called Beauty Scoop with Kate Shapland, published in 2004.

== Personal life ==
She had a relationship with guitarist Jeff Beck from the age of 18, living with him for six years.

She married England rugby captain Will Carling in 1994. They divorced in 1996.

Julia married Sony executive Rob Stringer in 2006.

She is a vegetarian and is interested in Egyptology, having taken a Diploma in the subject at Birkbeck, University of London.
