= Howard Stableford =

British television and radio presenter

- Born: 12 April 1959 (age 66)
- Occupations: television and radio presenter

Howard Stableford is a British television and radio presenter.

== Background ==
Stableford was born 12 April 1959 in Poynton, Cheshire and grew up in Preston, Lancashire. He attended Hutton Grammar School. He read for a Geography degree at Durham University, where he was a member of University College, graduating in 1980.

== Broadcasting career ==
BBC Radio Lancashire gave Stableford his first break in broadcasting where he was station assistant. He then joined BBC Radio Northampton at its launch in 1982 where he hosted a daily show. He then moved into BBC Children's TV. There, he hosted Beat the Teacher and presented Newsround before joining the BBC's flagship science and technology programme Tomorrow's World in 1985, presenting alongside Judith Hann, Peter Macann and Maggie Philbin; he was one of the programme's longest serving presenters. After leaving Tomorrow's World in 1997, he moved to the United States, settling in Colorado, where his positions have included technology reporter for KUSA and stadium announcer with Major League Rugby team the Colorado Raptors. Splitting his time between there and the United Kingdom, in 2000 he presented Changing Places on BBC Radio Four and in 2003 he became co-host of UK's Worst ... on BBC1. He returned to Tomorrow's World in 2018 for a one-off live special co-hosting with Maggie Philbin and Dr Hannah Fry.

== Other work ==
Stableford was also President of the UK's Institute of Patentees and Inventors, and in the United States has worked for the Center for Creative Leadership in Colorado Springs.
