= Tony Dortie =

British TV personality

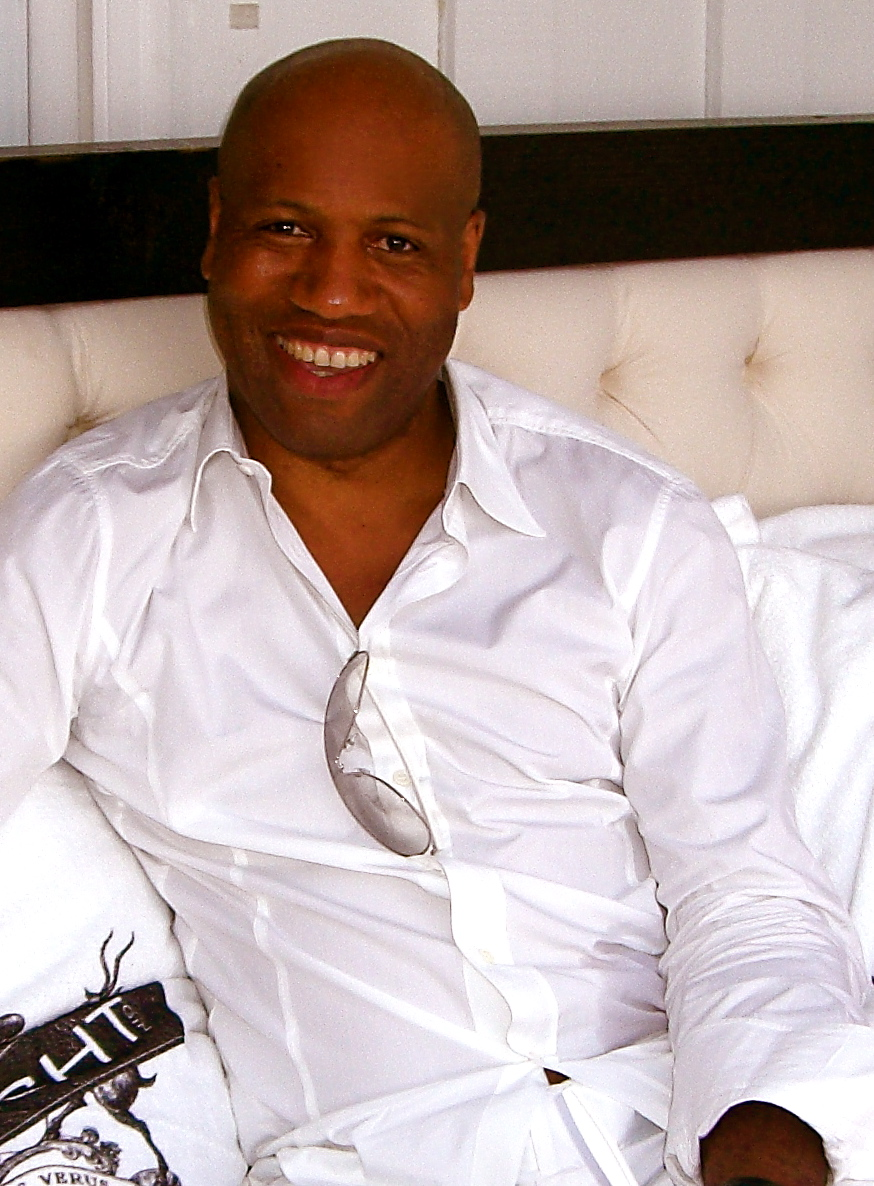
- Dortie in Malibu, California
- Born: Clement Anthony Dortie; July 1963 (age 62); London, England
- Occupations: Television presenter, writer, MC
- Website: http://www.tttentertains.com/

Clement Anthony Dortie (born July 1963) is a British television personality and former presenter of Top of the Pops. He owns the production company Triple T Entertainment. Dortie has hosted programs for various entertainment networks, including the BBC, Music Box, ITV (Schofield's Quest), British Film Institute, MTV, BBC World Service, and 3e (Glam Slam).

== Early life ==
Dortie was born in London and grew up in Lewes, Sussex.

Dortie began his on-screen broadcast career as a contributor to Music Box while still in school. He later worked for Children's BBC UP2U, before joining Mark Franklin on 3 October 1991 as one of the regular hosts of the newly formatted Top of the Pops, a position he held until 1994. After leaving Top of the Pops, Dortie held several jobs, including refuse collector, traffic warden, and public toilet cleaner for Hackney Council, before establishing his own production company, Djem Productions Ltd.

== Television format creation ==
Dortie enjoyed his first breakthrough from creating and writing TV formats with the show, TXTC, which was broadcast first in Thailand, and then many other Asian countries. In 2004, TXTC was nominated for an Asian TV Award for best game show. Dortie next wrote Chain Reaction for Fox8 in Australia hosted by Mieke Buchan.

His writing skills caught the attention of Fremantle Media, and then 2waytraffic, where he enjoyed success with TXTC.

== MC and Red Carpet host ==
A chance meeting with the UK team behind G-Unit led Dortie into becoming an MC and appearing regularly as the Saturday night host of Madnights at "Cirque at the Hippodrome", as well as touring internationally. During this time he worked on stage with Pharrell, Akon, Simon Webbe, Lethal Bizzle, D12, Flawless and hosted a live Pimp My Ride International with Xzibit.

Under the banner of his new company Triple T Entertainment (referred to commonly as TTT), Dortie wrote and created Million Dollar Babes for ITV2. Broadcast Magazine Million Dollar Babes
