= Seabridge =

Suburb of Newcastle-under-Lyme, England

Coordinates: 52.9895°N 2.2429°W

- Location within Staffordshire
- OS grid reference: SJ837435
- District: Newcastle-under-Lyme
- Shire county: Staffordshire
- Region: West Midlands
- Country: England
- Sovereign state: United Kingdom
- Post town: NEWCASTLE
- Postcode district: ST5
- Dialling code: 01782
- Police: Staffordshire
- Fire: Staffordshire
- Ambulance: West Midlands
- UK Parliament: Newcastle-under-Lyme

Seabridge is a suburb of Newcastle-under-Lyme in Staffordshire, England.

The origin of the name "Seabridge" is unknown as it is situated in the Midlands, far from any major body of water.

A place spelt as 'Shebrugge' is mentioned in 1403, in a legal record where the county margination is Staffordshire.
