= Adrian Juste =

English disc jockey and radio presenter

- Born: April 21, 1947 (age 79); Kirby Muxloe, Leicestershire, England
- Occupations: Disc jockey; radio presenter

Adrian Juste (born 21 April 1947 in Kirby Muxloe, Leicestershire, England) is an English disc jockey and radio presenter who had a Saturday lunchtime programme on BBC Radio 1 from 1978 to 1994.

== Early life ==
Juste attended Guthlaxton Grammar School in Wigston. He later worked as a motor mechanic and salesman.

== Radio Career ==
Juste began his radio career with Leicester's local BBC station in 1969, moving to Birmingham's BRMB as the breakfast show presenter and then to Radio 1 in 1978, beginning his weekend shows in April 1978.

The format of his Radio 1 show consisted of Juste playing clips from various classic comedy sketches, interspersed with his own puns and short sketches between music tracks. His selection of classic comedy clips was at times quite complex, and intricately produced, using material from a wide variety of sources edited into one sequence. This style of show was inspired by Jack Jackson, who died shortly before Juste commenced on Radio 1. Controversially, he produced an audio tape in the style of his show which was used as a promotional aid by the Conservative Party.

Juste was amongst the older DJs who were dismissed during the early 1990s by the then controller of Radio 1 Matthew Bannister, presenting his last show on New Year's Day 1994. He bitterly railed against the changes in a subsequent BBC television documentary on Bannister's time at the radio station. Juste subsequently made appearances on LBC, Radio Carousel and Jewel FM, and later worked as an advertising writer. He also did a few editions of "The UK Top 20 Rewind" with Shaun Tilley during 2003. He appeared on a Christmas special on BBC local radio in 2005 and two more shows for KCFM, during 2008 and 2009 featuring the usual mix of music and comedy.

Juste later provided the voice-over for the online bingo site tombola on its "Bingo 50" game. He presented shows in the south west on BBC local radio stations on Christmas Days in 2010, 2011 and 2012, and one final show that aired on BBC Radio Devon and BBC Guernsey between 12:00 and 13:00 on Christmas Day 2013.
