= Wendy Lloyd =

English voiceover artist and radio and TV presenter

Wendy Anne Lloyd (born 23 May 1969) is an English voice-over artist and radio and TV presenter. She has been a DJ/presenter at BBC Radio London, Radio Luxembourg, Virgin Radio, BBC Radio 1, Talk Radio UK, and LBC Radio.

On television she hosted The Little Picture Show (1995), Dial Midnight (1992) Top of the Pops (1995) and many film and entertainment shows. She also presented Brainwaves with Prince Edward (2000). As a voice-over artist she is best known for Great British Menu (series 6–14). She also voiced the documentary The Man Who Ate Himself to Death, which told the story of Ricky Naputi; the documentary was broadcast on Channel 5 in the UK in 2014 and is now available on UK Netflix. She has also voiced other TV programmes.
