= Femi Oke =

British television presenter and journalist

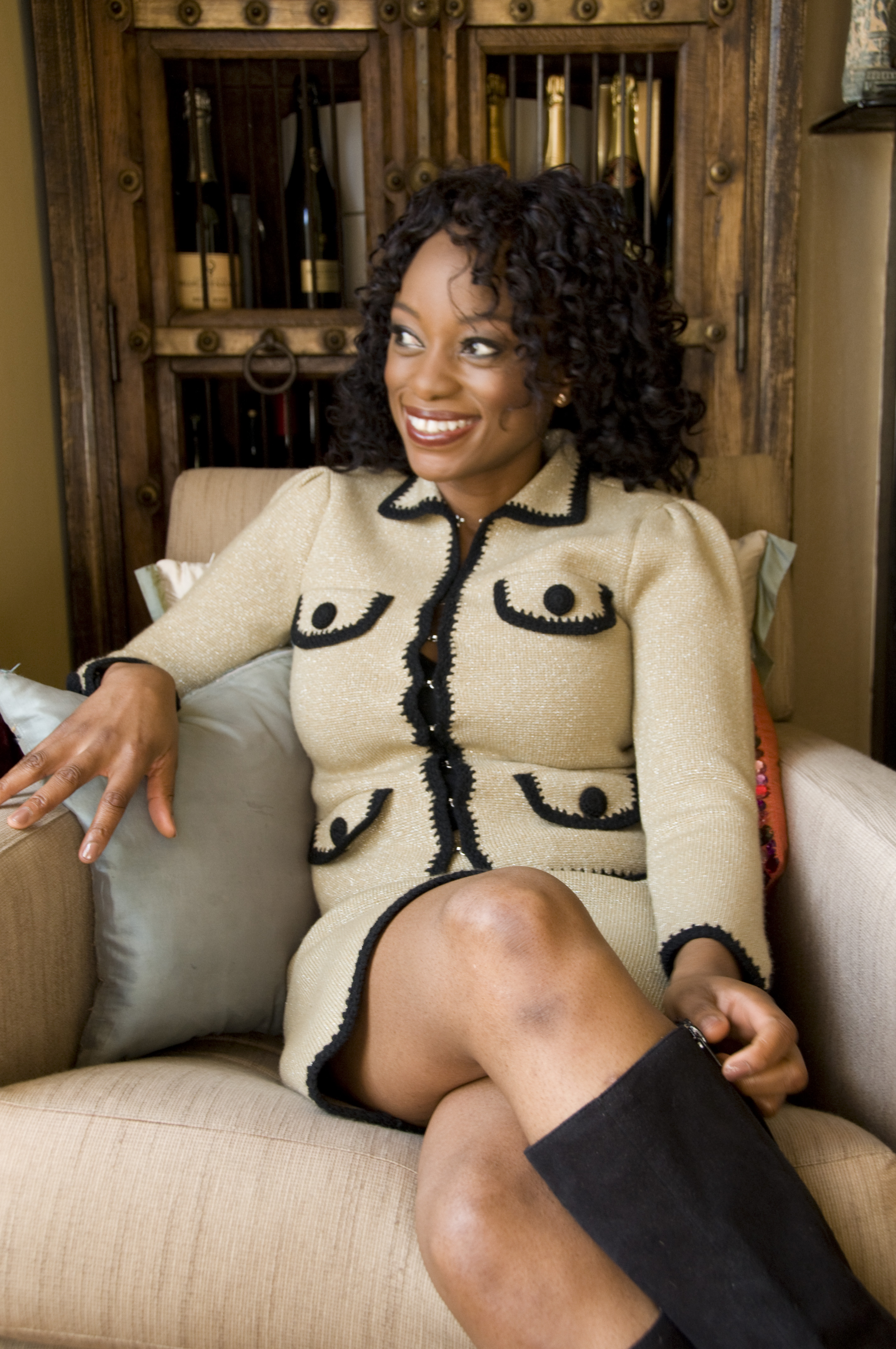
- Oke in 2008
- Born: 30 June 1966 (age 60); London, United Kingdom,
- Education: Bachelor's degree in English literature and language.
- Alma mater: Birmingham University
- Occupation: Television journalist
- Employer: The Stream on Al Jazeera English
- Known for: Public speaking / Journalism
- Website: therealfemioke.com

Femi Oke (/ˌoʊˈkeɪ/ OH-KAY; born 30 June 1966) is a British television presenter and journalist.

== Early life and education ==
Femi Oke was born in London, United Kingdom to Nigerian parents. She is a graduate of the University of Birmingham, where she received a bachelor's degree in English literature and language.

== Broadcasting career ==
Oke began her career at the age of 14 working as a junior reporter for the LBC the UK's first talk radio station. During 1992 and 1993, she worked for a cable station called Wire TV. Oke presented several shows for the station, including the popular Soap on the Wire on a Saturday afternoon, with soap-opera expert Chris Stacey. In the early 1990s, Oke presented the BBC's flagship educational science programme Science in Action and was also a presenter of Top of the Pops. She has also worked for London Weekend Television (1995–1999), Men & Motors (1998–1999) and Carlton Television (1994–1995).

She is a former anchor for CNN International's World Weather service at the network's global headquarters in Atlanta, Georgia. She presented weather segments for the programs Your World Today and World News. She also regularly hosted Inside Africa, now fronted by Errol Barnett, a programme that looks into the economic, social and cultural affairs and trends in Africa. She joined CNN in August 1999, and worked there until 2008. She used to appear as a daily newscaster, contributor and interviewer on Public Radio International/WNYC's morning public radio news program, The Takeaway. Currently, she hosts The Stream on Al Jazeera English.

== Public speaking ==
She has accepted an invitation to teach on behalf of the World Meteorological Organization in Buenos Aires, Argentina, conducted guest lectures for the University of Liberia, Emory University in Atlanta and been a guest speaker at the United Nations, addressing the World Food Programme in Rome, Italy.

== Film ==
Oke appeared in the short film The Last Hour (2005).
