= Peter Powell (DJ) =

English DJ and radio presenter (born 1951)

- Born: Peter James Barnard-Powell; 24 March 1951 (age 75); Stourbridge, Worcestershire, England
- Occupations: Disc jockey; radio presenter
- Years active: 1970–1988

Peter James Barnard-Powell (born 24 March 1951) is an English former disc jockey, popular on BBC Radio 1 in the late 1970s and 1980s, as well as a television presenter for the BBC music chart programme Top of the Pops.

== Early career ==
Powell was educated at Uppingham School, a boys' independent school in Rutland in the English Midlands. Powell began his broadcasting career as the first voice on air when BBC Radio Birmingham launched in 1970, and then had a brief spell on BBC Radio 1 in 1972.

He then went to Radio Luxembourg before rejoining Radio 1 in 1977. Almost immediately after his arrival at the station he made his debut as a Top of the Pops presenter, joining Radio 1 colleagues on the roster.

== BBC Radio 1 career ==
Powell began as a weekend presenter on the station, presenting a Sunday show from 10 am to 1 pm, before a move to Saturdays in October 1978, again from 10 am to 1 pm.

From 29 September 1984 until his departure from the station on 25 September 1988 Powell presented the weekend breakfast show from 8 to 10 am.

Throughout his 11-year stay at Radio 1 he became strongly associated with the Radio 1 Roadshow, which he presented each summer, and other outside broadcasts. He was also known for hosting the TV coverage of the annual Montreux Rock Festival, BBC2's Oxford Road Show and for his high-profile working relationship with fellow Radio 1 DJ Janice Long between October 1984 and July 1985.

== Management ==
Since leaving radio he has concentrated on building his management company.

== Personal life ==
Powell was married to Anthea Turner from 1990 to 1998.
