= Anthea Turner =

English television presenter

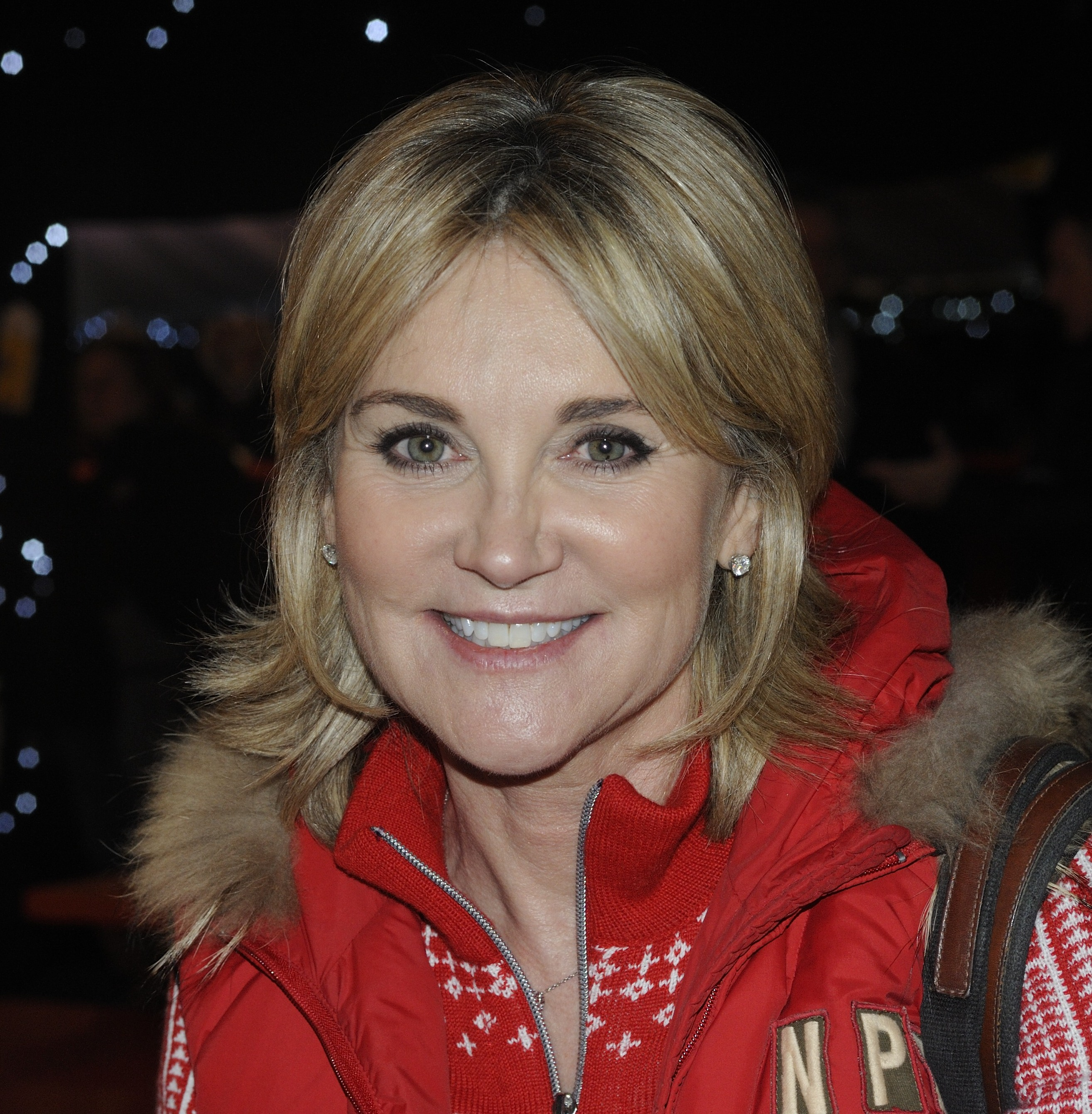
- Turner in 2016
- Born: 25 May 1960 (age 66); Stoke-on-Trent, Staffordshire, England
- Occupation: Television presenter
- Years active: 1986-present
- Notable credit(s): Presenting: Blue Peter (1992–94); Top of the Pops (1988–91); GMTV (1994–96); Perfect Housewife (2006–07)
- Spouses: Peter Powell (m. 1990; div. 1998) Grant Bovey (m. 2000; div. 2015)
- Family: Wendy Turner-Webster (sister)
- Website: Official website

Anthea Turner (born 25 May 1960) is an English television presenter. She was a host of Blue Peter from 1992 until 1994, and of GMTV from 1994 until 1996.

== Early life ==
Turner was born in Stoke-on-Trent, Staffordshire, and educated at the Roman Catholic girls' school St Dominic's Grammar School in Stoke. She was one of three daughters born to her parents Brian and Jean Turner. One of her sisters, Ruth, died aged 15. Her other sister is presenter Wendy Turner-Webster.

=== Television ===
In July 1989, during a motorbike stunt that went wrong on UP2U, Turner suffered burns and temporary hearing loss, which led to a successful lawsuit against the BBC.

The relationship between Turner and her GMTV co-presenter Eamonn Holmes was frosty, with Holmes issuing an ultimatum to the GMTV management that he would leave if they did not sack his colleague: as a result, Turner lost her job. After Bovey left his wife Della for Turner, with ensuing tabloid interest, Turner's career went into a decline. Her autobiography Fools Rush In, for which she was paid an estimated £400,000 advance, sold 451 copies in its first week of release in November 2000 and entered the bestseller charts at No. 531.

Turner took part in a special celebrity edition of Channel 4's First Dates on 12 October 2015, in aid of Stand Up to Cancer.

On 20 November 2017, Turner appeared on the BBC show Celebrity Antiques Road Trip in an episode set in Staffordshire and Cheshire. In 2018, she appeared on the Channel 5 show Celebs in Solitary, where she attempted to spend five days in solitary confinement.

Turner is currently an ambassador for Crystal Care Collection, a care home company with homes across England and Wales, and appeared in TV advertisements for the brand in 2026.

=== Dancing on Ice ===
In 2013, Turner appeared as a contestant in the eighth series of Dancing on Ice, where she finished in ninth place out of twelve celebrity skaters. She participated in the show with her professional skating partner Andrew Buchanan. In the third week she performed to the Donny Osmond song "Puppy Love", and ended up in the skate-off against Keith Chegwin. They lost the skate-off and were the fourth couple to be eliminated from the series.

== Personal life ==
Turner's private life has been covered in the tabloid press. The then-editor of the Daily Mirror, Piers Morgan, admitted in April 2003 that the interest of the popular press in Turner's private life had seriously damaged her career.

After her long relationship with one-time DJ co-worker Bruno Brookes, she married her manager, former DJ Peter Powell in 1990; the couple divorced in 1998.

The year of her divorce from Powell, Turner moved in with Grant Bovey. Bovey left his wife, Della, to move in with Turner. He was later reconciled with Della, before leaving her again to return to Turner. Turner and Bovey married on 23 August 2000. Turner had been keen to start her own family with Bovey, who has three daughters from his previous marriage but she failed to conceive either naturally or through IVF.

OK! magazine was sold exclusive rights to the Bovey-Turner wedding for an amount that Turner described as "substantial". The only photograph released to the media was of Bovey and Turner biting into toast and a Cadbury Snowflake chocolate bar, which had been provided by the magazine. Several tabloids ran critical stories, but Turner wrote in her autobiography that she believed that the photo that would be released to the media would be a "traditional wedding-day shot" and OK! confirmed that neither Turner nor Bovey had been involved in the picture's release.

Turner further wrote "The whole thing smacked of us selling our souls for sponsorship, which could not have been further from the truth. We'd never entered into any discussion or financial agreement with the chocolate company: our only link with them had been the box of confectionery that they had sent for the reception. Indeed, the whole concept was absolutely abhorrent to us both. To say I was gutted would be a gross understatement. It just goes to show that even the most experienced of us can be lulled into a false sense of security and caught off guard." A Guardian journalist commented that the stunt "genuinely derailed [Turner's] career".

Turner and Bovey split up in 2012, due to Bovey's extramarital affair with a much younger woman. After an initial reconciliation, they separated again in August 2013, this time permanently, and they divorced in 2015. From 2019, Turner has been in a relationship with businessman Mark Armstrong, to whom she is engaged, she credits presenter Lizzie Cundy for the introduction.

== Books ==
- Underneath the Underground: The Ghost of Knightsbridge (1998) – with Wendy Turner Webster
- Fools Rush In (2000)
- How to Be the Perfect Housewife: Lessons in the Art of Modern Household Management (2007)
- How to Be the Perfect Housewife: Entertain in Style (2008)
- The Perfect Christmas (2008)

== Appearances ==
Television

Year	Title	Role
1988–91	Top of the Pops	Presenter
1992–94	Blue Peter	Presenter
1994–96	GMTV	Presenter
1994–96	The National Lottery Draws	Presenter
1996–99	Wish You Were Here...?	Presenter
1997	Turner round the World	Presenter
2000	Your Kids Are in Charge	Presenter
2000	Celebrity Robot Wars	Contestant
2001	Celebrity Big Brother	Participant
2006–07	Anthea Turner: Perfect Housewife	Presenter
2007	Help Me Anthea, I'm Infested	Presenter
2010–11	Dinner Party Wars	Presenter
2013	Dancing on Ice	Contestant
2014	The Jump	Contestant
2015	The Health Lottery Draws	Presenter
2020	Celebrity SAS: Who Dares Wins	Contestant
2022	The Real Dirty Dancing, UK	Contestant
2025	Must Have Ideas	Presenter

Guest appearances

- Blankety Blank (1989)
- The Lily Savage Show (1998)
- Loose Women (1999, 2000, 2003, 2008, 2016)
- Never Mind the Buzzcocks (2006)
- The Wright Stuff (2006, 2007, 2008, 2013, 2014, 2015, 2016)
- The Alan Titchmarsh Show (2008)
- Hell's Kitchen (2009)
- The Gadget Show (2009)
- All Star Family Fortunes (2009)
- Let's Dance for Sport Relief (2009)
- All Star Mr & Mrs (2010)
- Pointless Celebrities (2012, 2014, 2015)
- 10 O'Clock Live (2012)
- Daybreak (2012)
- This Morning (2013)
- Sky News (2013, 2014, 2015, 2016)
- Who's Doing the Dishes? (2015)
- Celebrity First Dates (2015)
- Through the Key Hole (2015, 2017)
- Celebrity Antiques Road Trip (2017)
- 8 Out of 10 Cats Does Countdown (2019)
- Susan Calman's Grand Week by the Sea, in Tenby (2022)
