= The Parody Album =

Studio album by Chris Moyles
- Released: 23 November 2009
- Recorded: September – October 2009
- Genre: Comedy
- Label: Sony
- Producers: Chris Moyles; Sandy Beech

Chris Moyles chronology
The Parody Album (2009)	The Difficult Second Album (2012)

The Parody Album is the debut album by radio and television presenter Chris Moyles, host of The Chris Moyles Show on BBC Radio 1. It was released on 23 November 2009 and charted at number 17 in the UK Albums Chart and has since sold over 100,000 copies.

The album has spawned an online game in which you have to collect lyric notes to complete Moyles' album. The game itself is a parody of Super Mario Bros.

The album cover is a parody of Take That’s Circus album. Chris’s song “Buy Us a Pint,” a parody of “Hold Up a Light,” was not approved by Take That and was therefore not included on the album.

== Recording ==
The album was recorded at the Abbey Road Studios in London throughout September and October 2009, and features parodies made famous on Moyles' Radio 1 show, alongside original compositions and brand new parodies.

The album features many members of The Chris Moyles Show team including Comedy Dave, Carrie Prideaux and Dominic Byrne. Moyles has said that he was proud that the album was an 'Aled-free zone' referring to the absence of The Chris Moyles Show producer, Aled Haydn Jones.

The album features collaborations with Amy Perez, Alex Dover, Ricky Wilson and Calvin Harris.

== Track listing ==
No.	Title	Original Song & Artist	Length
1.	"My Parody Album"	Bank Holiday Monday (Stereophonics)	4:03
2.	"Lorrydriver"	Womanizer (Britney Spears)	3:44
3.	"Meat Again"	Beat Again (JLS)	3:15
4.	"Liar"	Fire (Kasabian)	3:58
5.	"Funeral Song"	Original Composition	3:23
6.	"The Boy Does Plenty"	The Boy Does Nothing (Alesha Dixon)	3:44
7.	"Barack Obama"	L.S.F. (Kasabian)	3:19
8.	"Waterproofs"	Bulletproof (La Roux)	3:26
9.	"Album Track" (featuring Comedy Dave)	Original Composition	3:29
10.	"Dance Wiv Me" (featuring Calvin Harris and Camilla Ice)	Dance Wiv Me (Dizzee Rascal)	3:05
11.	"Nana Window"	Original Composition	2:50
12.	"I Predict A Diet" (featuring Ricky Wilson)	I Predict A Riot (Kaiser Chiefs)	3:54
13.	"Davina McCall"	I Love It When You Call (The Feeling)	3:18
14.	"José" (featuring Dominic Byrne)	Rosé (The Feeling)	3:39
15.	"Dicky Tum"	Dumb (The 411)	2:31
16.	"Dogz Don’t Kill People (Wabbitz Do)"	Guns Don't Kill People Rappers Do (Goldie Lookin Chain)	3:01
17.	"Addicted to Plaice"	Addicted to Bass (Puretone)	3:40
18.	"Big Bum"	Sex Bomb (Tom Jones)	3:21
19.	"Never Gonna Snow"	Original Composition	3:31
20.	"Last Track on the Album"	Original Composition	5:51

== Charts ==
=== Weekly charts ===
Chart (2009)	Peak position
Scottish Albums (Official Charts)	20
UK Albums (Official Charts)	17

=== Year-end charts ===
Chart (2009)	Position
UK Albums (OCC)	110
