= Space Pirates (2007 TV series) =

British children's television series

- Space Pirates promotional poster
- Created by: Tony Reed
- Written by: Tracey Hammett; Sheila Hyde; Robbie Sims; Ariane Sherine; Sam West; Edd White
- Directed by: Bridget Caldwell
- Starring: Luke Toulson; Kirsty Rider; Connor Panayi; Adam Carter; Dominic Byrne
- No. of series: 1
- No. of episodes: 30

Production
- Producer: Tony Reed
- Running time: 30 minutes per episode (approx.)

Original release
- Network: CBeebies
- Release: 3 November 2007 – 22 March 2008

Space Pirates is a British 2007 children's television series created by Tony Reed, originally shown on CBeebies. It uses a mixture of live action and animation, set aboard a spaceship called "Guisto" which orbits Earth. It starred Luke Toulson as Captain DJ, and featured the voice of (then) Radio 1 newsreader Dominic Byrne as an alien news/weather/travel reporter called Zorst. There are 30 half-hour episodes which were first shown from 3 November 2007 until 22 March 2008.

== Background ==
Space Pirates was commissioned for the BBC's CBeebies channel. The show is now designed to reach all ages and "bring the whole family together to explore a diverse range of musical performances." According to the BBC, for 6 weeks from 9 November 2007, viewers could press the red button on their TV remote controls and choose which of the three songs they wanted to listen to at the very end of the show. The show has also featured on the CBeebies slot on BBC Radio 7.

In 2008, the episode "Music to Paint to" was nominated for a Banff World Television Award. The show was also nominated for Best Pre-School Live Action Series at the 2008 BAFTA Children's Awards.

== Storyline ==
The space ship Guisto is led by Captain DJ, (played by Luke Toulson) who is very vain and stupid. It just orbits planet Earth searching for music for the radio show, Guisto Radio. The tenuous storyline in every episode usually involves two space-wise kids, eight-year-old Honk and six-year-old Tonk, who are played by children. They trick Captain DJ and Lippy by selling him something worthless for lots of doubloons or junk food. Lippy is a five-year-old half parrot and half microphone who often makes fun of Captain DJ. Captain DJ's real name is occasionally revealed (as "Leslie"). Also featured is a newsreader/weather forecaster/traffic reporter called Zorst, who is a green barnacle who clings to the stern of the ship (near the exhaust, hence his name). He always ends his reports with bad jokes (followed by the line "If you don't get it, just forget it"). There are always 3 musical acts per episode, one either performed live on set (or specially recorded in another location), one pop-video, and one cover song by three rats called The Jingles - Windy, Stringy and Brassy. A group of children on Earth, called the Pirate Posse, get to vote on which song was the best and who they want to hear again, which always plays out the show.

== Music ==
The theme tune to the series, written by Darren Loveday and former Busted keyboardist Chris Banks, was released as a single available for download on iTunes, Chris Moyles popularised the song by playing it on his radio show, hoping to get it into the UK charts and beat The X Factor Christmas single ("When You Believe" by Leon Jackson). The result of Moyles' campaign was that the song completely failed to have any impact on the UK Singles Chart, although the song did spend eleven weeks at position number one on the iTunes Children's Chart. Moyles later played a mashup of the song that mixed it with the theme tune from Ghostbusters, the irony being that the mashup was actually created by Chris Banks himself.

Acts which appear on the show include: The Ebony Steel Band, McFly, The Cheeky Girls, Jamelia, The Drifters, The Puppini Sisters, Julie Felix, the London Community Gospel Choir, and The Ukulele Orchestra of Great Britain.

== Cast ==
- Captain DJ (aka 'Leslie'): Luke Toulson
- Lippy the Parrot Microphone: An anthropomorphic parrot-microphone hybrid. Adam Carter
- Honk the Girl who is Tonk's older sister: Kirsty Rider
- Tonk the Boy who is Honk's younger brother: Connor Panayi
- The Jingles, a trio of musical space rats:
  - Stringy: Brian Herring
  - Brassy: Sarah Burgess
  - Windy: Dave Chapman
- Zorst the Alien Barnacle: Dominic Byrne
- The Jolly Rogers, The sentient flag: Stephen Cannon
- Assistant Puppeteers: William Banyard, Yvonne Stone, Warrick Brownlow-Pike

== Episodes ==
No.	Title	Written by	Original release date
1.1	"Music to Drum Along To"	Robbie Sims; Tracey Hammett	3 November 2007
Captain DJ and crew have a noisy mission which doesn't help DJ's headache. It does, however, help Honk and Tonk disguise the sound of their doubloon-making contraption. Video: KT Tunstall - Black Horse and the Cherry Tree green button 3rd place Jingles: Wipe Out ("originally by The Ventures") yellow button 1st place Studio Guest: Kuljit Bhamra playing the Tabla drums blue button (Posse Pick) 2nd place
1.2	"Music for Play Time"	Sheila Hyde; Tracey Hammett	10 November 2007
Honk and Tonk are too busy trying to sell their latest cargo of odd shoes, so Captain DJ brings aboard some very special guests to help. Studio Guest: McFly - All About You green button (Posse Pick) 2nd place Recorded: Backbeat Percussion Quartet from the UK yellow button 3rd place Jingles: Status Quo and The Beach Boys' Fun, Fun, Fun blue button 1st place
1.3	"Music to Paint to"	Robbie Sims; Tracey Hammett	17 November 2007
The Pirate Posse's mission inspires Captain DJ to do a spot of painting. Honk and Tonk's latest doubloon-making scheme means that Captain DJ ends up with more than just a spot of paint on him, and a nasty taste in his mouth. Video: R.E.M. - Shiny Happy People green button 3rd place Jingles: The Rolling Stones' She's a Rainbow yellow button 1st place Recorded: Blue Man Group, recorded in the UK blue button blue button (Posse Pick) 2nd place
1.4	"Music that Makes Me Laugh"	Sheila Hyde; Tracey Hammett	24 November 2007
Up to their doubloon making schemes, Honk and Tonk try and sell Captain DJ his own cargo. Video: Tony Christie featuring Peter Kay - Is This the Way to Amarillo green button (Posse Pick) 2nd place Jingles: Charles Penrose's The Laughing Policeman yellow button 1st place Studio Guest: The Cheeky Girls "and their cheeky niece" - Farmyard Hokey Cokey blue button 3rd place
1.5	"Music to Listen to on a Journey"	Sam West; Tracey Hammett	1 December 2007
The pirate posse are going on a long journey and want some music to while the time away. Captain DJ (or Leslie) receives a call from his "friend" Steve - the man-in-the-moon, who is obsessed with cheese, and wants DJ to make some for him. He sets Honk and Tonk the task to stop them causing trouble. Unfortunately, they suss this out and decide to pay him back by being more troublesome than usual- they trick Lippy into buying the cheese for 10 doubloons and wearing it on his head, claiming it will make people do everything he says. The plan backfires - Captain DJ rescues Lippy, then punishes Honk and Tonk by sending them on the most boring holiday ever - a whole weekend of cheese-related activities with Steve. Video: Bob Sinclair - World, Hold On (Children of the Sky) green button 2nd place Studio Guest: The Ukulele Orchestra of Great Britain - I'm Gonna Be (500 Miles) yellow button (Posse Pick) 3rd place Jingles: Frank Sinatra's Come Fly with Me blue button 1st place
1.6	"Music for a Trip to Space"	Sam West; Tracey Hammett	8 December 2007
The pirate posse are preparing for a trip to space, and ask Captain DJ to find them some music to listen to on the trip. Honk and Tonk attempt to take over control of the Gusto Radio Show by disguising as repairmen and sabotaging the ship, persuading Lippy to go along with their plan by bribing him with candy. But Captain DJ discovers their plan just in time to save his position. Video: The Police - Walking on the Moon green button (Posse Pick) 2nd place Jingles: Jamiroquai's Cosmic Girl yellow button 1st place Studio Guest: Julie Felix (and Bernard O'Neill) - Space Girl blue button 3rd place
1.7	"Music that Makes Me Feel Special"	Edd White; Tracey Hammett	15 December 2007
Lippy is aghast, as Captain DJ is being even more big-headed than usual. It's thanks to his new book, From Poop Deck to Anchorman: How to Get Ahead in Radio, which teaches him to be super-confident at all times. Video: Bel's Boys - Today's The Day green button 2nd place Jingles: U2's Sweetest Thing yellow button 1st place Studio Guest: Jamelia - Superstar blue button (Posse Pick) 3rd place
1.8	"Music to Listen to on Holiday"	Robbie Sims; Tracey Hammett	17 December 2007
Whilst surfing the sound waves for great songs to listen to on holiday, Captain DJ still finds time to fall for another of Honk and Tonk's money-making schemes. Jingles: Madonna's Holiday green button (Posse Pick) 1st place Studio Guest: Steve Homes playing the Spanish guitar yellow button 2nd place Video: Vengaboys - We Like to Party blue button 3rd place
1.9	"Music to Dress up to"	Robbie Sims; Tracey Hammett	18 December 2007
Tonk's new gold grabber nets him and Honk a lot of gold which Captain DJ very quickly nabs for himself. Honk and Tonk speedily hatch a plan to get their gold back and make Captain DJ look ridiculous at the same time. Jingles: The Kinks' Dedicated Follower of Fashion yellow button 1st place Video: Nelly Furtado - Powerless (Say What You Want) green Button 2nd place Recorded: Chinese Lion dance (Posse Pick) blue button 3rd place
1.10	"Music for When We Feel Bored"	Ariane Sherine; Tracey Hammett	19 December 2007
Everyone thinks Captain DJ is boring especially as he won't buy one of Honk and Tonk's honking hats. Video: Junior Senior - Move Your Feet green button 2nd place Jingles: Black Lace's Agadoo yellow button 1st place Studio Guest: Mixed Up (junk percussion band) (Posse Pick) blue button 3rd place
1.11	"Music for the Countryside"	Ariane Sherine; Tracey Hammett	20 December 2007
Captain DJ's embarrassing phobia of Wellington boots is no longer a secret thanks to the broadcasting power of his talkative microphone, Lippy. Honk and Tonk pretend to help him, but is it just a money making scheme? Video: Berri - Sunshine after the Rain green button 2nd place Recorded: Indigenous Australian Didgeridoo music yellow button 3rd place Jingles: Eva Cassidy's Fields of Gold blue button (Posse Pick) 1st place
1.12	"Music to Surprise Me"	Robbie Sims; Tracey Hammett	21 December 2007
It's Captain DJ's birthday and his annual tradition of a little model-making is put in jeopardy by all the surprises the crew have in store for him. Jingles: Gilbert and Sullivan's With cat-like tread (from The Pirates of Penzance) green button 1st place Video: Björk - It's Oh So Quiet yellow button 2nd place Studio Guest: Stringfever (String quartet) blue button (Posse Pick) 3rd place
1.13	"Music to Listen to with My Family"	Robbie Sims; Tracey Hammett	22 December 2007
Captain DJ (whose real name is Leslie), is asked by the pirate posse to find some music for them to play at a family get-together. Captain DJ's mum phones to say that his parents are coming to visit, which causes him to panic. Honk and Tonk see the opportunity to sell some space-cakes to him for a whopping 200 doubloons - he is so desperate he pays. He has wasted his money - his mum phones to cancel at the last minute. Video: Spice Girls - Mama green button 3rd place Studio Guest: The Drifters - Saturday Night at the Movies yellow button 2nd place Jingles: Sister Sledge's We are Family blue button (Posse Pick) 1st place
1.14	"Music Not to Sing to"	Edd White; Tracey Hammett	24 December 2007
The crew have been enjoying Pirate Karaoke Day, and the Pirate Posse's mission to find music not to sing to is a welcome relief for their sore throats. Video: Frankie Knuckles - The Whistle Song green button 3rd place Jingles: Booker T. & the M.G.'s Green Onions yellow button (Posse Pick) 1st place Studio Guest: "Marvel" (human beatbox) blue button 2nd place
1.15	"Music to Cheer Me Up"	Edd White; Tracey Hammett	26 December 2007
Captain DJ wants the show to be a Blues special but no one wants to hear sad songs. Even putting his guitar in the bin doesn't stop him from singing the Blues, but the Pirate Posse come to the rescue by requesting songs that'll cheer everyone up. Video: Take That - Shine green button 2nd place Jingles: The Monkees' Daydream Believer yellow button 1st place Studio Guest: The Puppini Sisters - Boogie Woogie Bugle Boy blue button (Posse Pick) 3rd place
1.16	"Music to Explore with"	Edd White; Tracey Hammett	27 December 2007
Captain DJ sends the crew on a treasure hunt looking for the lost treasure of Mount Tipadelawayo, but Honk and Tonk find it hard to hide their disappointment when they find out what the treasure is. Recorded: Mongolian music (the "Hanggai band") green button 3rd place Jingles: The Lion Sleeps Tonight yellow button 1st place Video: Aqua - Doctor Jones (Posse Pick) blue button 2nd place
1.17	"Music to Party to"	Ariane Sherine; Tracey Hammett	28 December 2007
It's all hands on deck to find great songs to party to, and Captain DJ is in far too good a mood to be interested in Honk and Tonk's latest money-making scheme. He can't see why anyone would want to buy pants that make you feel angry. The not-so-Jolly Rogers can, however. Video: S Club 7 - Don't Stop Movin' green button 2nd place Recorded: Drumming from the Liverpool Samba School from brazil yellow button (Posse Pick) 3rd place Jingles: Kool & the Gang's Celebration blue button 1st place
1.18	"Music to Listen to with a Group of People"	Sam West; Tracey Hammett	29 December 2007
With everyone wearing headphones, Captain DJ struggles to command the ship more so than ever. Video: Dario G - Carnaval De Paris green button 3rd place Studio Guest: London Community Gospel Choir - This Little Light of Mine yellow button (Posse Pick) 2nd place Jingles: Auld Lang Syne blue button 1st place
1.19	"Music to Jump Around To"	Robbie Sims; Tracey Hammett	5 January 2008
Finding great tunes to jump to helps Captain DJ and company deal with an infestation of space fleas. Honk has a little secret which has them heading to Papua New Guinea, where they find unusual music. Video: Lolly - Viva La Radio green button 2nd place Jingles: Van Halen's Jump yellow button 1st place Recorded: Traditional sing-sing music from Papua New Guinea blue button (Posse Pick) 3rd place
1.20	"Music to Go to Sleep To"	Ariane Sherine; Tracey Hammett	12 January 2008
Captain DJ is very sleepy and not really up to anything, he's even too sleepy to look for music to go to sleep to for the Pirate Posse. Luckily, Honk and Tonk have the perfect - if a little smelly - sleepy cure. Video: Jason Donovan - Any Dream Will Do green button 2nd place Jingles: Beethoven's Moonlight Sonata yellow button (Posse Pick) 1st place Recorded: "Netsai" playing the Mbira blue button 3rd place
1.21	"Music to Dance to"	Edd White; Tracey Hammett	19 January 2008
Honk and Tonk manage to trick Captain DJ into having a makeover live on air. Video: Scissor Sisters - I Don't Feel Like Dancin' green button 2nd place Recorded: Riverdance yellow button 3rd place Jingles: DJ Casper's The Cha Cha Slide blue button (Posse Pick) 1st place
1.22	"Music to Warm Me Up"	Robbie Sims; Tracey Hammett	26 January 2008
It's very hot on board today thanks to an infestation of woodworm. Captain DJ meets his biggest fan, who proves to be more useful than he'd first thought. Video: The Polyphonic Spree - Light and Day / Reach For the Sun green button 2nd place Studio Guest: The Ebony Steelband blue button (Posse Pick) 3rd place Jingles: Arrow's Hot Hot Hot yellow button 1st place
1.23	"Music to Count to"	Sam West; Tracey Hammett	2 February 2008
Captain DJ is suffering from dreams about green monsters. Honk and Tonk use this to their advantage - they disguise as the green monsters and demand a lot of privileges for Honk and Tonk. The gullible captain is fooled. Unfortunately after he has been humiliated by them, Lippy tells him that the monsters were really Honk and Tonk. He decides to give them a taste of their own medicine by making them dress in sheep outfits and run round his bed, so he can count them and fall asleep. Jingles: The Jackson 5's ABC green button (Posse Pick) 1st place Video: Steps - 5,6,7,8 yellow button 2nd place Recorded: Grenadiers' Marching Band blue button 3rd place
1.24	"Music to Spin Around to"	Ariane Sherine; Tracey Hammett	9 February 2008
The crew are in a spinning mood and ready for some hula-hooping. This is great news for the Pirate Posse, who want great music to spin around to. Captain DJ, though, is not so keen, as he is already feeling giddy. Video: Ronan Keating - Life Is a Rollercoaster green button 2nd place Recorded: Ballroom dancing from Blackpool yellow button (Posse Pick) 3rd place Jingles: Twist and Shout blue button 1st place ("made famous by The Beatles")
1.25	"Music to Sing to"	Robbie Sims; Tracey Hammett	16 February 2008
The crew are in a singing mood, but that's not so good for Honk who has lost her voice. Tonk is able to help when he finds a recipe for "the silent treatment", and Honk is soon back to her normal noisy self. Video: Village People - Y.M.C.A. green button 2nd place Jingles: The Carpenters' Sing yellow button (Posse Pick) 1st place Recorded: Traditional coursera song from South Africa blue button 3rd place
1.26	"Music to Splash Around to"	Edd White; Tracey Hammett	23 February 2008
The posse want some songs to listen to while they play in water. Captain DJ discovers some rubber rings and flippers and tries them out, but they are Honk and Tonk's, and he is forced to buy them because he has tried them. The Jingles contribution to the show is a disaster, when all the talk of water makes Windy desperate for the toilet. Jingles: Handel's Water Music green button 1st place Video: Christina Aguilera - Car Wash yellow button 3rd place Studio Guest: Alasdair Malloy - I'm Forever Blowing Bubbles (on his glass harmonica) blue button (Posse Pick) 2nd place
1.27	"Music to Relax to"	Sam West; Tracey Hammett	1 March 2008
Honk and Tonk make Captain DJ some special "relaxing" tea, but it has the opposite effect. Video: Enya - Orinoco Flow green button 3rd place Recorded: Tibetan Buddhist chanting yellow button 2nd place Jingles: Otis Redding's (Sittin' On) The Dock of the Bay blue button (Posse Pick) 1st place
1.28	"Music for a Sunny Day"	Sheila Hyde; Tracey Hammett	8 March 2008
Captain DJ's sunglasses may not be as cool as he thinks as he finds it hard to see anything. Jingles: Katrina and the Waves' Walking on Sunshine green button 1st place Recorded: "Bill Bill's bamboo band" from Papua New Guinea (Posse Pick) yellow button 2nd place Video: DJ Jazzy Jeff & The Fresh Prince - Summertime blue button 3rd place
1.29	"Music to Tidy My Room with"	Sam West; Tracey Hammett	15 March 2008
The posse have to tidy their room, so they want some music to make it less tedious. Captain DJ disguises himself as his formidable grandma, Granny Whitebeard, in order to get some work out of Honk and Tonk. His plan backfires when he "pops to the little pirate room" (i.e. goes to the loo), and the real Granny Whitebeard phones. Honk and Tonk get their revenge by making Captain DJ change costume several times in swift succession, and then making him dress as a maid and clean the ship himself. Video: Shakin' Stevens - This Ole House green button (Posse Pick) 2nd place Studio Guest: "Mandy and Ciaran" playing the spoons yellow button 3rd place Jingles: Fairground Attraction's Perfect blue button 1st place
1.30	"Music that Makes Me Want to Shout"	Ariane Sherine; Tracey Hammett	22 March 2008
The Captain is in such a 'shouty' mood that he loses his voice. Luckily Honk and Tonk's latest money making scheme, noisy beards, comes to the rescue. Video: James Brown - I Got You (I Feel Good) green button 2nd place Recorded: Māori Haka from New Zealand yellow button 3rd place Jingles: Lulu's Shout blue button (Posse Pick) 1st place
