= Folk Face =

British comedy band

- Origin: London, England (The Chris Moyles Show)
- Genres: Folk music, comedy rock
- Years active: 2005; 2007-2012
- Past members: Dave Vitty; Dominic Byrne
- Website: folkfacebook.com

Folk Face were a comedy band formed in 2005 by BBC Radio 1 DJ Dave Vitty and BBC Newsreader Dominic Byrne. Mainly appearing on The Chris Moyles Show, they also appeared in person at the Glastonbury Festival and at several Radio 1 events. They mainly did cover versions in a tongue-in-cheek folk music style.

They appeared at the Glastonbury Festival in 2005, but disbanded soon after, only re-forming for a one-off on 20 June 2007 for The Chris Moyles Show to give away tickets for the Glastonbury Festival 2007.

Byrne played guitar for the band, however Vitty played different instruments, these being the bongos in 2005 and the nose flute in 2007.

They auditioned for Dave Grohl on 6 July 2007, while Grohl was in London for Live Earth, in the hope of securing a warm up slot at one of the Foo Fighters future gigs. Grohl was reminded of this and asked to consider it while on air on Radio 1 on the 22 November 2007, however no confirmation of an offer for supporting the band, this time for the Radio 1 Foo Fighters Gig at Wembley on 7 June 2008, was made. Folk Face also played live on 15 February 2008, at Mote Park in Kent, when Radio 1 announced that their One Big Weekend would be coming from Maidstone, also playing the actual event on 10 May 2008. Folk Face were mistaken for band Scouting for Girls who also played live at the launch, in the BBC's in-house magazine Ariel.

Folk Face auditioned for Sir Andrew Lloyd Webber, for a chance to represent the UK at the 2009 Eurovision Song Contest. Folk Face failed to impress Lloyd Webber, who commented that the lyrics could have upset Russia among other countries.

More recently, Folk Face played a song at the 2009 Big Weekend in Swindon, as part of the breakfast show team's set of song parodies. They also toured the UK for the first time through August and September 2010.

On 11 April 2011, they announced on The Chris Moyles Show that Folk Face would play Glastonbury Festival 2011.

On 10 January 2013 Dominic Byrne tweeted that it was a "sad day today with the news that Folkface are no more." However, he did state that there was the possibility that the band could re-form for a farewell show in the summer.
