= Fran Scott =

Science presenter

- Scott in 2026
- Website: https://www.franscott.co.uk

Fran Scott is a science presenter best known for her work on CBBC's Absolute Genius with Dick and Dom. Scott, who has a MSc in Neuroscience, is the Clothworkers' Science Content Producer at the Royal Institution.

== Radio and television ==
Scott is a science presenter on Children's BBC, where she has presented How to Be Epic at Everything and the BAFTA-nominated Absolute Genius with Dick and Dom. She has also presented and appeared as a judge on Newsround, as well as being a guest on Hacker Time.

Scott has presented two BAFTA-nominated programmes for BBC2, The Imagineers and You Too Can Be An Absolute Genius. She co-presented Factomania for BBC Knowledge and has featured as science presenter on Channel 4's Sunday Brunch. Scott has presented How Dangerous Is Your...? for BBC Radio 4 Extra. In 2018, she became a judge on Channel 4's Lego Masters.

In 2019, Scott appeared on the series Massive Engineering Mistakes for the Discovery Channel. She also frequently appears as a guest on Abandoned Engineering on Discovery.

== Stage ==
Scott has presented science stage productions for several years, sharing a stage with Professor Robert Winston, Richard Hammond and Professor Brian Cox, among others. Her stage production company, Great Scott! Productions, has been commissioned for work by Google for Education, CBBC and Siemens.

== Awards ==
- RTS 2013: Best Learning or Education Programme
