= Charles Penrose (entertainer) =

English music hall artist and comedian (1873–1952)

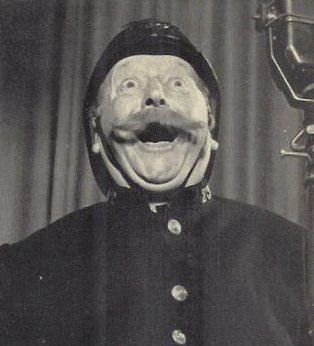
- Charles Penrose as The Laughing Policeman

Background information
- Born: Charles Penrose Dunbar Cawse; 11 November 1873; Biggleswade, Bedfordshire, England
- Died: 17 November 1952 (aged 79) Kensington, London, England
- Genres: Music hall
- Occupations: Musician, comedian, entertainer
- Instrument: Vocals
- Years active: 1891–1952
- Label: Columbia

Charles Penrose (born Charles Penrose Dunbar Cawse; 11 November 1873 – 17 November 1952) was an English music hall and theatre performer, and later radio comedian, who is most notable for his comic song "The Laughing Policeman". He was born in Biggleswade, Bedfordshire, the son of a master watchmaker and jeweller.

== Early life ==
He initially followed his father into the jewellery trade, but enjoyed such success with his innovative laughing songs at local concert parties that he was invited to join a theatrical tour at the age of 18. His theatrical career took off, and he appeared in music hall and the West End. One of his most successful performances was in Tonight's the Night at the Gaiety Theatre, London in 1914–15. Penrose married Harriet Lewcock in 1899.

== Performing career ==
It was his second wife, songwriter Mabel Anderson, who became his most important collaborator. In 1922, Penrose made the first recording of his song "The Laughing Policeman" under the pseudonym 'Charles Jolly', with the composition of the song officially credited to his wife Mabel under the pseudonym 'Billie Grey'. However, the music, melody, and the idea of the laughing interlude are taken from "The Laughing Song" by the American George W. Johnson, which was first recorded in 1891. The Penroses wrote numerous other laughing songs including "The Laughing Major", "Curate", "Steeplechaser", "Typist", "Lover" and "Sneezing Man". The B-side of The Laughing Sneezing Man was a short comical sketch called "The Dog Vs The Cornet" where a little boy had to get his dog to out-sing a cornet player and make him stop playing.

== Radio ==
Penrose was one of the first comedians to star on BBC Radio, being known as Sgt. Bob Evergreen in the wartime radio series The Pig and Whistle. He was also a character actor in a number of films in the 1930s and 1940s.

== Death ==
Charles Penrose died of heart disease on 17 November 1952 at the Princess Beatrice Hospital, Kensington, aged 79.

== Filmography ==
- Honeymoon for Three (1935) as Laughing passenger
- The Crimes of Stephen Hawke (1936) as Sir Franklin
- Calling the Tune (1936) Cameo appearance
- Dreams Come True (1936) (uncredited)
- Boys Will Be Girls (1937) as Laughing Man in club (uncredited)
- The Derelict (1937) as Toby's Pal
- Save a Little Sunshine (1938) as Agent (uncredited)
- The Dark Eyes of London (1939) as Morrison, undercover detective (uncredited)
- The Man with the Magnetic Eyes (1945) as Roberts
- Miranda (1948) as Stage Manager (uncredited)
