= David Vitty =

British radio DJ (born 1974)

- Born: David Lloyd Vitty; 24 April 1974 (age 52); British Hong Kong
- Education: Bedford School
- Spouses: Emma Pontefract (m. 2003; div. 2006); Jayne Sharp (m. 2008; div. 2011)
- Children: 1
- Presenting career
- Show: The Chris Moyles Show (2004–2012); Hits Radio Breakfast (2018–2019)
- Station: Hits Radio (2018-2019)
- Time slot: 6:30 am – 10 am
- Style: Disc jockey
- Country: United Kingdom
- Website: www.bbc.co.uk/radio1/chrismoyles

David Lloyd Vitty (born 24 April 1974) is a British radio presenter. He worked alongside Chris Moyles at BBC Radio 1, having originally been a broadcast assistant on Moyles' early morning show. He became the show's head writer and 'Director of Comedy' and moved with Moyles to the drivetime slot, and then to Radio 1 Breakfast, during which time the programme was known as The Chris Moyles Show. In total, he spent 14 years from 1998 to 2012 working alongside Moyles.

Vitty has also presented other shows on BBC Radio 1 and BBC Radio 5 Live, as well as some presenting work on television, including Channel 4's Coach Trip. He is a former contestant on Dancing on Ice.

== Background ==
Vitty was educated at Glenealy Junior School and Bedford School. After school, Vitty studied Radio Production at college, but never had any ambitions to be on-air. He began working as a copywriter and then moved onto becoming a "tech op" for Radio 1 on 5 December 1996.

In 1997, Vitty met Chris Moyles – they got on well with each other and Moyles invited Vitty to work with him on his early morning show. When Moyles transferred to drive time in 1998, Vitty went with him and became "Comedy Dave" after comedian Lee Hurst asked Vitty on the show who he was, he said "Super Dave" to which Hurst sarcastically responded "Comedy Dave more like" in reference to his formative years nickname.

Vitty is a fan of Everton F.C. as his father and other family members from the Prenton area were also fans of the club.

== The Chris Moyles Show ==
Vitty's regular daily contribution to The Chris Moyles Show was the "Tedious Link" (which launched September 2002 – a parody of Jo Whiley's now-defunct "Tenuous Link"), a collection of loosely connected information, where one fact led into another by way of juxtaposition, which then eventually led into the title of a song (or the musicians responsible for it), often a "classic" or memorable tune, which was usually played at precisely 9 am, preceded by the Greenwich time pips. Once the song had been played he was questioned by listeners and the rest of the crew about the validity of the information given out during the "Tedious Link" (the theme tune from Treasure Hunt is usually played in the background). The theme music from the TV comedy show Bottom was used as the "bed" (underlying music) for the feature but for January 2009 Chris Moyles unveiled a new purpose-written jingle and music.

It was announced on the show on 11 July 2012 that Chris Moyles would be leaving the Radio 1 Breakfast Show in September 2012.

Vitty did not return when The Chris Moyles Show did in September 2015 on Radio X.

== Marathon broadcast for Comic Relief ==
Moyles announced in February 2011 that both he and Vitty would, in aid of Comic Relief, attempt to present Radio 1's Longest Show Ever with Chris Moyles and Comedy Dave for Comic Relief, a record previously held by Simon Mayo. The show began at 6:30 am on Wednesday 16 March and at 7:31 pm on Thursday 17th Moyles and Vitty reached the 37-hour mark which gained them the record for the Longest Radio Show in BBC Radio 1 history. They continued to broadcast and at 8.30 am Friday 18th broke the Guinness World Records' record for the 'Longest Marathon Radio DJ (Team) Show'. By the end of the show at 10.30 am, they had set a new record of 52 hours and raised £2.4 million for Comic Relief 2011 via online and SMS donations.

Subsequently, the total raised has increased to £2,821,831 and with an audience of 2.84 million, it was the most popular live BBC Red Button radio feature ever.

== Other radio work ==
On 5 January 2013 Vitty made his debut on BBC Three Counties Radio presenting Saturday Breakfast for two weeks.

In 2018, Vitty returned to early morning on the new "Hits Radio", presenting alongside Gethin Jones & Gemma Atkinson. It was announced on 30 May 2019 that Vitty and Jones would leave the station, with Atkinson moving to the Drivetime show after her maternity leave.

== Band ==
Vitty was part of the comedy folk band Folk Face with Dominic Byrne, a newsreader on The Chris Moyles Show.

== Dancing on Ice ==
Vitty appeared on the 6th series of Dancing on Ice with British adagio ice skater Frankie Poultney. He was knocked out in the skate-off on Sunday 13 February 2011.

== Other work ==
Vitty has co-presented cover shows on Radio 1 entitled Chappers and Dave, with the ex- The Scott Mills Show sidekick Mark Chapman. On 30 December 2006, on the "Celebrity Couples Edition" of The Weakest Link, Chapman and Vitty won, beating the Chuckle Brothers in the final round. They both toured student unions across the UK regularly on their 'Chappers and Dave World Tour', and raised money for both Comic Relief and Sport Relief by visiting football stadiums across the UK.

On 28 February 2007, Vitty appeared in an edition of Ready Steady Cook. He previously presented a programme called Shed Sports 1 on Nuts TV and co-presented on UK Play's The Chris Moyles Show.

Vitty appeared on BBC game show, Hole in the Wall in an episode aired on 26 September 2009.

On 29 December 2009, Vitty appeared on Celebrity Mastermind, raising money for Cancer Research UK. He finished third overall on 17 points.

Between 2010 and 2012, Vitty provided the narration for Channel 4 series Coach Trip for a total of four series.

In 2020, Vitty started co-hosting Fuelling Around, a motoring podcast with British Touring Car Championship driver Jason Plato. It was confirmed on 30 March 2021, that the chat-show style offering would be returning for a second series. He hosted a first live show with an appearance from Bradley Walsh marking the start of a third series in November 2021.
