= Live with Chris Moyles =

- Titles
- Genre: Entertainment chat show
- Developed by: UMTV
- Presented by: Chris Moyles
- Theme music composer: Vibe Music Imaging
- Country of origin: United Kingdom
- Original language: English
- No. of seasons: 1
- No. of episodes: 65

Production
- Executive producer: Chris Evans
- Producer: Greg Bower
- Production locations: London, England
- Running time: 30 minutes

Original release
- Network: five
- Release: 23 September – 20 December 2002

Related
- Live with Christian O'Connell

Live With Chris Moyles was a short-lived British comedy chat show on five, which aired weekdays at 7pm. The show was filmed in front of a live audience in a bar in London.

The show consisted of Moyles' unique take on the day's news, interactive fun and games with competitions such as 'Dancing Letters', and celebrity guests dropping in for a pint and a chat.

Chris Moyles talks about this show in The Difficult Second Book. In it he says how after a show he had a conversation with the producer, radio DJ and owner of UMTV, Chris Evans. During the conversation Moyles said he did not like the way the show was being made and that anyone could present it, and wanted to give it a unique style for his personality. After this Evans avoided Moyles until the end of the show's run. Although the show was commissioned for a second series, whilst Moyles was on holiday his agent was sent a press release saying that Christian O'Connell was the new host of the show and that Moyles was moving on to do other projects for Five.
