= Chris Moyles' Quiz Night =

2009 British TV game show

- Genre: Comedy
- Presented by: Chris Moyles
- Country of origin: United Kingdom
- No. of series: 5
- No. of episodes: 39

Production
- Running time: 50mins (inc. adverts)
- Production company: Magnum Media

Original release
- Network: Channel 4
- Release: 22 March 2009 – 3 February 2012

Chris Moyles' Quiz Night is a British television comedy panel game show, presented by Chris Moyles.

The show was originally shown on Channel 4 at 10 p.m. on Sundays and repeated on Mondays at 11 p.m. It included three rounds in which he took on three celebrity contestants in a quiz where the prize was an item from his own home. As he was also competing (in order to keep the prize), the questions were asked by a celebrity quiz master. The series has an all-female house band present in the studio who played the title music.

== Episode guide ==
=== Series 1 ===
Episode number	Air date	Celebrity contestants	Additional guests
1	22 March 2009	Mark Ronson, Louis Walsh and Barbara Windsor	Sharon Osbourne (quizmaster), Jeff Stelling, Rachel Riley, James Corden, Kezia Obama and Germaine Greer
2	29 March 2009	Ruth Jones, Ronan Keating and David Walliams	Jack Dee (quizmaster), Andy Akinwolere, Helen Skelton, Chris de Burgh, Anna Wing, Krishnan Guru-Murthy and Lionel Richie
3	5 April 2009	Alan Carr, Davina McCall and Jerry Springer	Melanie Brown (quizmaster), Ben Shephard and cast members of Heartbeat
4	12 April 2009	Gary Barlow, Stephen Fry and Denise van Outen	Heston Blumenthal (quizmaster), Keane, Pippa Black, Scott Major and Leonard Fenton
5	19 April 2009	John Barrowman, Keith Allen and Patsy Palmer	Seth Rogen (quizmaster), Ken Livingstone, Sir Patrick Moore and Chris Lintott
6	26 April 2009	Philip Glenister, Ulrika Jonsson and Justin Lee Collins	Jimmy Carr (quizmaster), Duncan Bannatyne, Tony Robinson and Phil Harding
7	3 May 2009	Carol Vorderman, Marco Pierre White and Claudia Winkleman	Michael McIntyre (quizmaster), John Craven and Peter Jones
8	10 May 2009	Patsy Kensit, Ben Miller and Abbey Clancy	Johnny Vegas (quizmaster), Ironik, Martin Kemp, Denise van Outen and the cast of Loose Women

- Abbey Clancy was crowned the winner of series 1.

=== Series 2 ===
The show returned on 26 February 2010 for a seven-episode run. There are no more guest quizmasters, however there are regular appearances every episode by certain celebrity quizzers such as Ozzy Osbourne and Peter Crouch.

Episode number	Air date	Celebrity contestants	Additional guests
1	26 February 2010	Peter Andre, Christine Bleakley and David Walliams	Ozzy Osbourne, Peter Crouch, The Hoosiers
2	5 March 2010	James Corden, Melanie Brown and Vic Reeves	Ozzy Osbourne, Peter Crouch, Newton Faulkner
3	12 March 2010	Dale Winton, Billie Piper and David Haye	Ozzy Osbourne, Peter Crouch, The Saturdays
4	19 March 2010	Jimmy Carr, Fearne Cotton and James Nesbitt	Ozzy Osbourne, Peter Crouch, The Automatic
5	26 March 2010	Sharon Osbourne, Johnny Vegas and Alesha Dixon	Ozzy Osbourne, Peter Crouch, Gabriella Cilmi
6	2 April 2010	Rob Brydon, Katie Price and Dominic Cooper	Ozzy Osbourne, Peter Crouch, JLS
7	11 April 2010	Peter Andre, Dale Winton and James Corden	Ozzy Osbourne, Peter Crouch, Alphabeat, Abbey Clancy

- James Corden was crowned series champion after beating Dale Winton, Peter Andre and host Chris Moyles.

=== Series 3 ===
A third series returned on 1 November 2010. A Christmas special aired on 22 December 2010, having been filmed two months earlier.

Episode number	Air date	Celebrity contestants	Additional guests
1	1 November 2010	Michael McIntyre, Louis Walsh and Jessie Wallace	David Tennant, Rio Ferdinand, McFly
2	8 November 2010	Jonathan Ross, Patsy Kensit and Louie Spence	David Tennant, Rio Ferdinand, The Wanted
3	15 November 2010	Charlotte Church, Patrick Kielty and Nick Frost	David Tennant, Rio Ferdinand, Eliza Doolittle
4	22 November 2010	Ruth Jones, Heston Blumenthal and Paddy McGuinness	David Tennant, Rio Ferdinand, Tinie Tempah
5	29 November 2010	Jimmy Carr, Holly Willoughby and Gavin Henson	David Tennant, Rio Ferdinand, Pixie Lott
6	6 December 2010	Alan Carr, Mischa Barton and Rupert Everett	David Tennant, Rio Ferdinand, Russell Watson
7	22 December 2010	Paddy McGuinness, Kelly Osbourne and Pamela Anderson	David Tennant, Rio Ferdinand, Jessie Wallace, Jason Donovan

- Paddy McGuinness was crowned series champion after beating Kelly Osbourne, Pamela Anderson and host Chris Moyles.

=== Series 4 ===
Episode number	Air date	Celebrity contestants	Additional guests
1	15 July 2011	America Ferrera, Kimberly Wyatt and Alan Carr	David Hasselhoff, Stephen Fry and Chipmunk
2	22 July 2011	Jack Whitehall, Sarah Harding and Vernon Kay	David Hasselhoff, Stephen Fry and Hanson
3	29 July 2011	Stacey Solomon, Chris Tarrant and Jimmy Carr	David Hasselhoff, Stephen Fry and Example
4	5 August 2011	Cuba Gooding Jr., Kevin Bridges and Lulu	David Hasselhoff, Stephen Fry and Lulu
5	12 August 2011	Micky Flanagan, Barbara Windsor and Dermot O'Leary	David Hasselhoff, Stephen Fry and Scouting for Girls
6	19 August 2011	Taylor Ann Hasselhoff, Hayley Hasselhoff, Keith Lemon and Christine Bleakley	David Hasselhoff, Stephen Fry, Bruno Brookes and The Wanted
7	26 August 2011	Ice Cube, David Walliams and Olly Murs	David Hasselhoff, Stephen Fry and Olly Murs
8	2 September 2011	Paddy McGuinness, Olly Murs and Chris Tarrant	David Hasselhoff, Stephen Fry and Dappy

- Olly Murs was crowned series champion after beating Paddy McGuinness, Chris Tarrant and host Chris Moyles.
- Vernon Kay was supposed to be on the show but couldn't make it due to rehearsals for Family Fortunes.

=== Series 5 ===
Series 5 started on 23 November 2011 proceeding a Hollywood Stars Quiz Night special that aired on 23 October 2011.

Episode number	Air date	Celebrity contestants	Additional guests
1	23 October 2011 (Hollywood Stars Quiz Night)	Will Ferrell, Louis Walsh and David Walliams	Britney Spears, Robbie Williams, One Direction and Paul O'Grady
2	23 November 2011	Jeremy Clarkson, Katherine Jenkins and Jason Manford	Britney Spears, Robbie Williams, Sugababes and Paul O'Grady
3	30 November 2011	Emma Bunton, Vic Reeves and Tulisa Contostavlos	Britney Spears, Jeremy Clarkson, Lethal Bizzle and Paul O'Grady
4	7 December 2011	Frank Skinner, Alesha Dixon and Jeff Stelling	Britney Spears, Jeremy Clarkson, Tinchy Stryder and Paul O'Grady
5	16 December 2011	John Barrowman, Pixie Lott and Jimmy Carr	Britney Spears and Paul O'Grady
6	26 December 2011	Olly Murs, Louie Spence, and James Corden	Britney Spears, Tulisa Contostavlos, Frank Skinner and Paul O'Grady
7	20 January 2012	John Bishop, Ruth Jones and Jason Derulo	Britney Spears, Jeremy Clarkson and Paul O'Grady
8	27 January 2012	Amir Khan, Gok Wan and Dappy	Britney Spears, Jeremy Clarkson, Rizzle Kicks and Paul O'Grady
9	3 February 2012	John Barrowman, Alesha Dixon and JLS	Britney Spears and Jeremy Clarkson

- Alesha Dixon was crowned series champion after beating John Barrowman, JLS (standing in for Olly Murs) and host Chris Moyles.

== International versions ==
The TV format was exported in Spain, with the title Mucho que perder, poco que ganar when it was aired on La Sexta and hosted by Anabel Alonso on 2011.
