= Factomania =

- Also known as: Really Cool Stuff
- Presented by: Dominic Byrne; Fran Scott; Greg Foot
- Country of origin: United Kingdom
- Original language: English
- No. of series: 1
- No. of episodes: 10

Production
- Running time: 60 minutes
- Production company: 360 Production

Original release
- Network: BBC Knowledge; BBC HD
- Release: 3 April 2014 – present

Factomania is a British factual television series that was first broadcast on BBC Knowledge and BBC HD on 3 April 2014. The hosts for the ten-part series are Dominic Byrne, Fran Scott and Greg Foot.

== Production ==
Factomania is a 360 Production for BBC Worldwide. BBC America included the series in its first co-production deal with BBC Worldwide. Lucy Pilkington is the executive producer for BBC Knowledge.
