= The Laughing Policeman (song) =

1922 music hall song recorded by Charles Penrose

Song by Charles Penrose
- Recorded: 1922 (original); 22 April 1926
- Genre: Music hall
- Label: Columbia Records
- Songwriters: George W. Johnson, Billie Grey

Official audio
- "The Laughing Policeman" on YouTube

"The Laughing Policeman" is a music hall song recorded by British artist Charles Penrose, initially published under the pseudonym Charles Jolly, in 1922. It is an adaptation of "The Laughing Song" first recorded in 1890 by American singer George W. Johnson with the same tune and form, but with the subject changed from a "dandy darky" to a policeman. Both "The Laughing Policeman" and "The Laughing Song" were highly popular songs in their time, and "The Laughing Policeman" remained popular in later decades as a children song in the UK.

== "The Laughing Song" ==
"The Laughing Song"
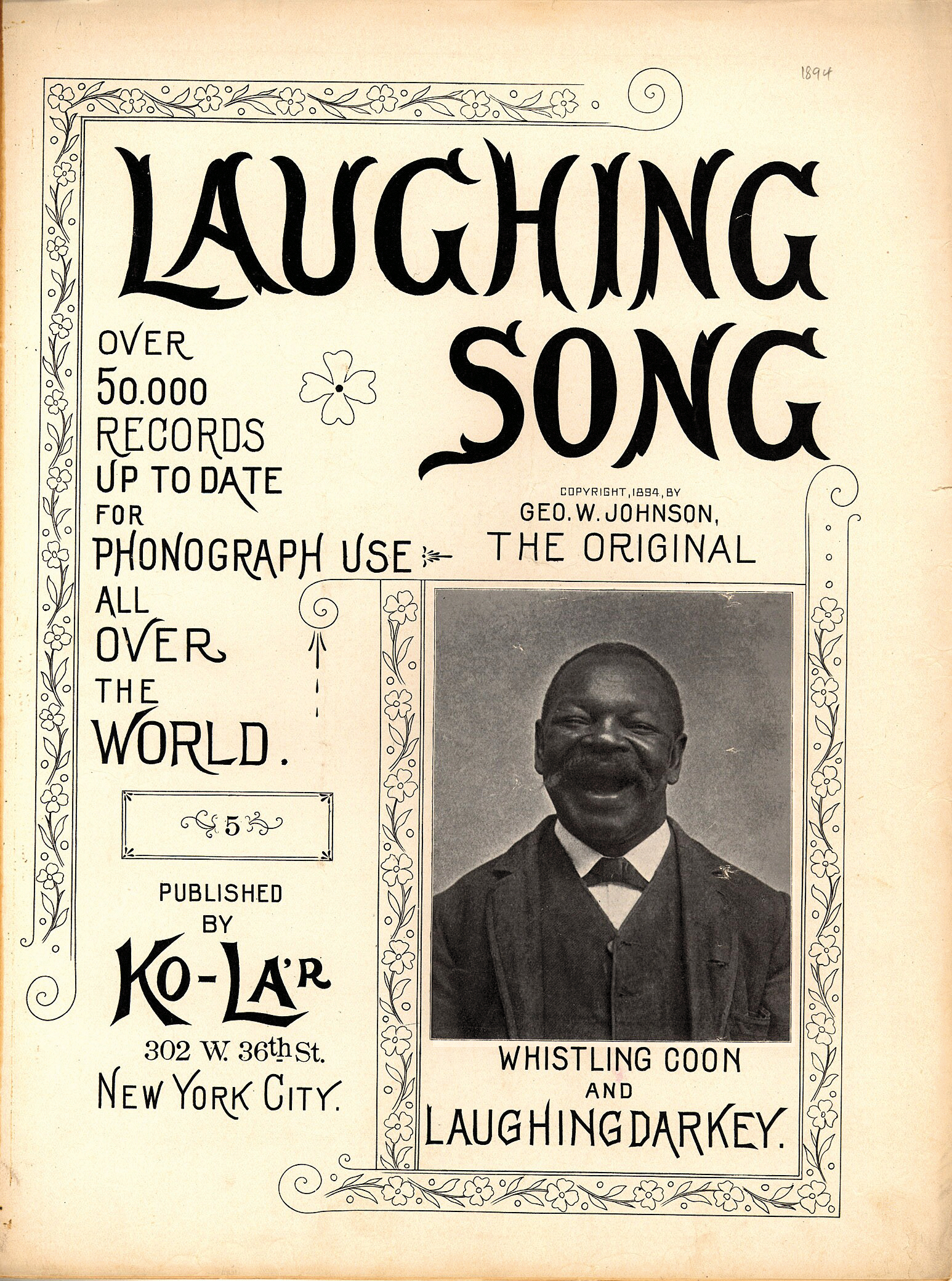

Song by George W. Johnson
- Published: 1894
- Recorded: 1890–1910
- Length: Various lengths, from 2:15 to 2:54
- Label: Various
- Songwriter: George W. Johnson

In 1890 George W. Johnson started his recording career in the fledgling phonograph industry, and one of the songs he recorded was "The Laughing Song". The song features Johnson in the persona of a "dandy darky" who laughs in time to the music. An early song where the singer sings with laughter in time to the music is "L'éclat de rire" (or the "Laughing Song") from the 1856 opera Manon Lescaut by Daniel Auber, and Johnson's song shows clear influence from that tradition.

Johnson's "Laughing Song" proved highly popular with the public, and it was ranked number one on a reconstructed pop chart for ten weeks from April from June 1891. Johnson was the first black performer to appear on America's popular music chart, and it was the first charted song known to have been written by an African American. However, the authorship of "The Laughing Song" has been questioned; sheet music of the song was published in 1894 and Johnson credited himself as the writer of both the words and music, but some doubted if he actually wrote the lyrics. Johnson also recorded a song entitled "The Whistling Coon" written in 1878 by minstrel Sam Devere, and that song reached number one in July and August 1891.

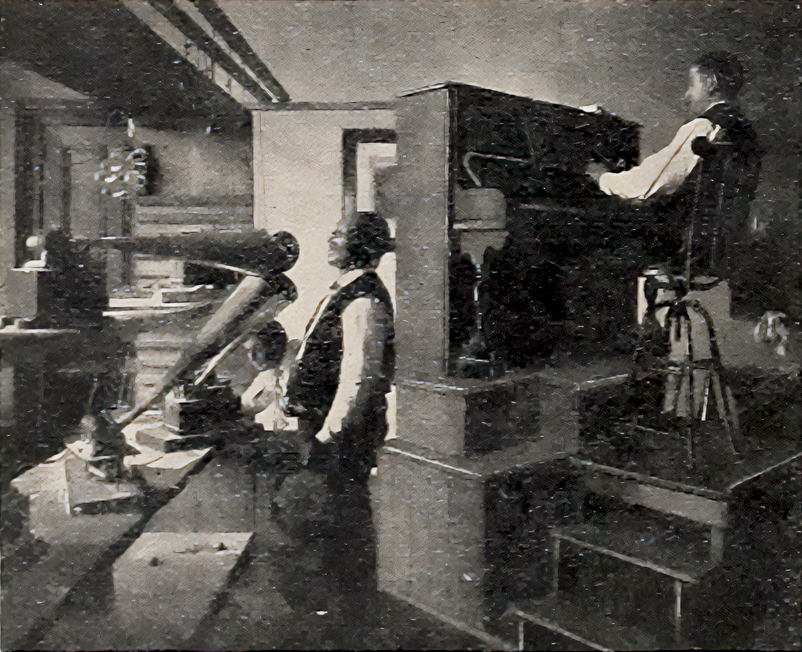
George W. Johnson recording in 1898, when phonograph cylinders had to be recorded four or five pieces at a time.

"The Laughing Song"
1898 recording of "The Laughing Song" by George W. Johnson

"The Laughing Song" is thought to have become the best-selling phonograph cylinder ever recorded by 1894, and it was claimed to have sold over 50,000 copies by the late-1890s. Such sales figure was very high for its time given that it was not possible to mechanically duplicate a record in the early years of the recording industry, and a singer had to record the same song four or five copies at a time over and over again, meaning that Johnson recorded the same song many thousands of times. The song was still popular by the early 1900s, although by this time record companies had developed the technology to duplicate records from a single recording.

At that time, there was no exclusive contract for recording a song, and singers were only paid for recording the song and no royalties were paid to the artists. Johnson recorded "The Laughing Song" for different recording companies, including New York's Metropolitan Phonograph Co, Columbia, and Edison. When disc records replaced cylinders, he continued to record for these companies as well as others such as Berliner and Victor until 1909 or 1910, by which time it was no longer as lucrative for him to record the song since he was only required to record a few times for the best recording to be duplicated.

"The Laughing Song" was covered by a white performer Burt Shepard in the 1900s, and it was his version that became known round the world outside of the United States. According to Fred Gaisberg, it sold over half a million copies in India. Shepard's version inspired "The Laughing Policeman" by Charles Penrose in the UK. Other versions were also record in different languages, including Italian ("A risa" by Berardo Cantalamessa), French (recorded in China by E. Labansat as "Laughing Foreigner" 洋人大笑), Hindi, Tamil and Telugu.

== Penrose's recordings ==
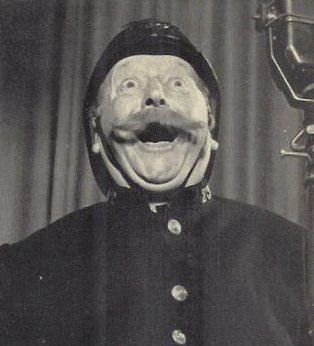
Publicity image of Charles Penrose for "The Laughing Policeman"

Charles Penrose used the melody of "The Laughing Song" as well as the same hook of using laughter in the chorus, but changed the lyrics in a number of versions, one of these was about a policeman recorded under the title of "The Laughing Policeman". The composition of the song is, however, credited entirely to Billie Grey, a pseudonym of Penrose's second wife Mabel. It has been suggested that the character of the Laughing Policeman was inspired by real-life police officer PC John 'Tubby' Stephens, a popular figure in Leicester.

Between 1912 and 1926, Penrose recorded different versions of the song with varying tempo and lyrics under the titles of "The Laughing Policeman", "I Tried to Keep from Laughing", "Laughing PC Brown", and "Laughing Ginger Brown". In June 1922, Penrose made a recording of "The Laughing Policeman", which was released on Regal Records (cat. G-7816. This song was released under the pseudonym of Charles Jolly, and this version only had modest sales. The version more usually heard was recorded on 22 April 1926 and released on Columbia Records (4014 and later FB 1184) under his own name. The version became one of the most successful songs of the period, with 120,000 copies sold by 1933. "The Laughing Policeman" was also reissued in 1935.

Penrose released another version of the song with Kaye Connor in 1929 titled "The Laughing Policeman Up to Date" (Columbia 5532), and that song sold 91,000 copies. Penrose and his wife wrote numerous other laughing songs (The Laughing Major, Curate, Steeplechaser, Typist, Lover, etc.), but only "The Laughing Policeman" is remembered today, having sold over a million copies in total.

The popularity of the song continued in later decades as a children song. It was a staple on the BBC Light Programme's Children's Favourites in the 50s and 60s, and it continued to be a frequently requested recording on its successor radio show Junior Choice on BBC Radio 1 in the 1970s. It remained one of the recordings most-frequently included in children's choice compilations and Radio 2 annual broadcasts even into the 21st century.

== Other versions ==
In 1955, Stikkan Anderson gave the song lyrics in Swedish, as "Den skrattande polisen" ("The laughing police officer"), which was recorded and released by Ove Flodin.

A dance mix was made, released on a 10-inch 45rpm disc, resembling an old-style 78rpm record, with the original version on the other side.

Bernard Cribbins recorded a parody version called 'Giggling Gertie the Laughing Traffic Warden', with the laughter provided by Miriam Margolyes.

== Lyrics ==
The song describes a fat jolly policeman who cannot stop laughing and has a chorus in which the sound of laughter is made in a sustained semi musical way by the singer. The first verse is:

I know a fat old policeman,
he's always on our street,
a fat and jolly red faced man
he really is a treat.
He's too kind for a policeman,
he's never known to frown,
and everybody says he's the happiest man in town.

Chorus
(Ha ha ha ha ha,
Woo ha ha ha ha ha ha ha ha,
Woo ha ha ha ha ha ha ha ha,
Ha ha ha ha ha ha ha ha ha ha,
Ha ha ha.)

== In popular culture ==
=== Literature ===
- The song is referenced in the 1968 novel The Laughing Policeman by Swedish writers Maj Sjöwall and Per Wahlöö and film of the same name. Fictional Swedish detective Martin Beck gets it as a Christmas present from his daughter Ingrid, but doesn't think it is funny. Beck's first laugh after the murder comes when Stenström's death is fully vindicated.

=== Television ===
- In 1974, Yorkshire Television created a television adaptation of The Laughing Policeman starring Deryck Guyler as PC 254, the titular laughing policeman. The show used the song as the opening and closing theme.
- In One Foot in the Grave episode "The Man Who Blew Away", the Meldrews are constantly kept awake by a late night party across the road, the worst coming when the partygoers join in the chorus of the song.
- In an episode of the BBC police drama City Central criminals steal an officer's radio and use it to broadcast the song continuously, disrupting police communications.
- In the BBC detective drama, Bergerac, the episode "Natural Enemies" features the song being played on a gramophone in a children's home, as several children laugh at Charlie Hungerford.
- The song is used as the central theme in the Space Pirates episode "Music that Makes Me Laugh".
- Ken Dodd performed it as part of one of his appearances on the popular BBC variety show The Good Old Days, getting the audience to laugh with him.
- The Wiggles did a parody of the song for their album and video "Wiggle House" titled "The Laughing Doctor".
- The song is parodied in the Chilean television show Cachureos, with it called "El Guatón" which is about the character Don Walo making fun of the shows cast and audience.

=== Film ===
- In the 1936 British film Calling the Tune, a fictional story of rivalry in the early days of the gramophone industry, Charles Penrose is seen recording "The Laughing Policeman" and performing the complete song.
- This song inspired the Telugu language song "Vivaha Bojanambu" in the Indian movie Mayabazar.

=== Postage stamp ===
- In 1990 the Royal Mail of the United Kingdom of Great Britain & Northern Ireland issued a 20p greeting stamp entitled The Laughing Policeman which bore an illustration based on the song.
