= The Chris Moyles Show =

British radio programme

The Chris Moyles Show is the title given to two differing versions of a radio programme hosted by Chris Moyles, originally broadcast as Radio 1 Breakfast from 5 January 2004 to 14 September 2012, before transferring three years later on 21 September 2015 to the Global Radio-owned commercial radio station Radio X. The show is broadcast between 6:30 and 10:00 each weekday (originally broadcasting from 7:00–10:00 between 2004 and 2007).

== Radio X version ==
The Chris Moyles Show (Radio X)
- Genre: Comedy, chat
- Running time: 210 minutes (6:30-10:00 am); 180 minutes (Saturday show, 8:00-11:00 am)
- Country of origin: UK
- Language: English
- Home station: Radio X
- Hosted by: Chris Moyles; Toby Tarrant (cover); Polly James (cover); Adam Brown (cover)
- Starring: Chris Moyles; Dominic Byrne; Chris Longman; Polly Marquis; Aaron Morgan
- Announcer: Paul Turner
- Produced by: Polly Marquis
- Executive producer: Aaron Morgan
- Recording studio: Studio 3J, Global Radio, Leicester Square, London
- Original release: 21 September 2015
- Audio format: Stereophonic sound
- Sponsored by: O2 (2015–2017); Lidl (2017–2018); Dave (2018); KFC (2019); McDonald's (2019); Green Flag (2020); BT Broadband (2021); Currys (2021); Greggs (2021, 2022); Motors.co.uk (2022, 2023); Škoda Auto (2024-)
- Website: Chris Moyles - Radio - Radio X
- Podcast: The Chris Moyles Show on Radio X Podcast

On 21 September 2015, Moyles relaunched the show on Radio X, the rebranded XFM, reviving the show under the same title. The new show incorporates elements of the Radio 1 incarnation of the show, in particular referencing the opening "Cheesy Song" at the start of the show before reverting to the Radio X imaging, Paul Turner providing prerecorded voice over, and Richard Oliver singing the show's jingle. In February 2016 RAJAR published the first listener figures for the Radio X show. However, these figures were only for FM listeners in London. Moyles provided a 39% boost in listeners for Radio X and gave the station its best breakfast show figures in London in almost a decade.

=== Format ===
The Chris Moyles Show's rebrand on Radio X consisted largely of the same format used in the Radio 1 version. The "Cheesy Song" and similar jingles were replaced by a more distinguished rock-led sound. Dominic Byrne returned for news, sport and weather. Similarly Pippa Taylor, also previously at Radio 1, returned as producer joining previous XFM Breakfast Show producer Dave Masterman.

=== Features ===
- Rob DJ's Monday Night Pub Quiz – the only regular feature to be carried over from the former Radio 1 incarnation, this is still played on each Tuesday's show. Rob DJ remains the host, with Pippa or Rob DJ asking the questions and providing answers.
- Weekend Round-Up Quiz Type Thing – presented by producer Polly Marquis (formerly Pippa Taylor), played every Monday since January 2019, this is a not-so-serious quiz of three stories that went viral over the previous weekend.
- Reverse Words – Audio Producer Chris Longman (formerly Matt Parkes-Smith) will record a phrase which is then played backwards. The team have to imitate the reversed phrase, recordings of which are also reversed (so that the phrase is now played "forwards") and see how close they can get to the original.
- Letters – Dominic Byrne reads out letters sent into the show by listeners, often accompanied by parcels of snacks and other items sent to the team. The address is then sung as a jingle, with many different versions featuring people such as Video Producer Alfie, David Hasselhoff, Taron Egerton, Jon Culshaw (as Donald Trump) and Wynne Evans (the GoCompare man).
- WhatsApp Messages – since 2019 the show has allowed listeners to send in audio messages via WhatsApp. These are then compiled and the best ones played out on the show.
- Happy Endings – Chris and Dom (sometimes Audio Producer Matt) compete head-to-head to identify a song from the final few seconds of the track. Themed versions are often played, such as a "Weather" or "Wimbledon" edition.
- The 6:45 Link – Chris lets the pips interrupt the show at 6:45 before adopting a cheesy local radio DJ voice, reminding the listeners that they are listening to Radio X and to “write that down” (in their RAJAR diary). He then plays a song in a genre that would not normally be played on Radio X (e.g. disco), often cutting it off before the verse or chorus and returning quickly to the conversation the team were having before the interruption.
- Craptic Birthdays – played on the Saturday Show, this is a quiz of celebrity birthdays hosted by Polly (formerly Pippa) where she gives the team clues that "are not good enough to be cryptic, hence craptic" for them to try to decipher, with Chris and Dom in particular pretending not to know the answers. Introduced by Pippa singing along with her own lyrics to the theme from Curb Your Enthusiasm Now presented by Polly Marquis.
- The Platinum Hour – the first Platinum Hour was played on Friday 25 September 2015. Excluding the news, sport, weather and advertising as much of the hour was filled with Moyles' favourite songs from the Radio X archives, typically songs that aren't normally played during standard Radio X broadcasting.
- Wheel of Inappropriate tracks – in this feature, created on the Radio X Chris Moyles Show, Moyles and the team would choose seven "inappropriate" songs (i.e. songs not of the musical genres usually played on Radio X) to then spin on a wheel and whichever it may land on, must play. This would then usually upset Mike, the head of music at Radio X. This feature usually takes place every show either between 7.45 and 8.15 am or between 9.45 and 10 am. It was dropped early on in the show's run, with the "wheel" later used for prize-giving contests for listeners. In January 2019 the original (physical) wheel collapsed live on air after being spun, narrowly missing Chris. Since then a digital wheel has been used with a sound effect of the original played at the same time.

=== Team members ===
Current

- Chris Moyles – host (2015–present)
- Dominic Byrne – newsreader and regular contributor (2015–present)
- Aaron Morgan - Executive producer (2026-present)
- Chris Longman (aka Captain/Captain Crapbeard owing to there already being a Chris on the show and Moyles formerly having a friend who appeared on the show called Longman) – sound designer and regular contributor (2022–present)
- Polly Marquis – producer and regular contributor (2025-present)
- Phoenix Stone – video producer and contributor (2022–present)
- Toby Tarrant – cover presenter and regular contributor (2017–present)
- Adam Brown – Radio X Early Breakfast DJ and regular contributor to “the First 25” from Global’s Manchester studios (2023-present)

Former

- Pippa Taylor – executive producer and regular contributor (2015–2025)
- James Robinson – executive producer and regular contributor (2017–2025)
- Matt Parkes-Smith – audio producer and regular contributor (2015–2022)
- Alfie Butler – video producer and contributor (2016–2019)
- Karl Russell – video producer and contributor (2015–2016)
- Dave Masterman – producer/day producer and regular contributor (2015–2017)
- Sam Owen – video producer and contributor (2019–2022)
- Harry Fell – relief sound designer and contributor (2022–2024)

=== Stand-in presenters ===
Johnny Vaughan initially covered the programme when Moyles and the team were absent and presented the programme under the title The 6.30 till 10 Thang – a variation on his normal 4 till 7 Thang drive-time slot. Vaughan used most of his own features from his afternoon slot and would be joined on air by his usual team of Gavin Woodman, Sunta Templeton, Big Si and Little Si.

As of 2019, Toby Tarrant is the regular cover presenter and retains a similar show format of chat, listener interactions and celebrity guests, especially when joined by Dominic Byrne. Other presenters such as Adam Brown and Polly James have also covered the show, particularly on Saturdays or bank holidays, but revert to a more generic Radio X show format by playing more music and shorter links.

== BBC Radio 1 version ==
The Chris Moyles Show (BBC Radio 1)
- Genre: Comedy, chat
- Running time: 180 minutes (7:00-10:00 am, 2004-07) 210 minutes (6:30-10:00 am, 2007-12)
- Country of origin: UK
- Language: English
- Home station: BBC Radio 1
- Hosted by: Chris Moyles; Scott Mills (cover); Sara Cox (cover); Vernon Kay (cover)
- Starring: Chris Moyles; Dominic Byrne; Pippa Taylor; David Vitty; Aled Haydn Jones; Tina Daheley
- Written by: Chris Moyles; David Vitty
- Produced by: Rachel Jones; Aled Haydn Jones; Freya Last
- Executive producer: Rhys Hughes
- Recording studio: Studio Y2, Yalding House, London
- Original release: 5 January 2004 – 14 September 2012
- Audio format: Stereophonic sound
- Opening theme: The Cheesy Song (from 2007)
- Website: The Chris Moyles Show
- Podcast: Best of Chris Moyles

At eight years and 253 days, The Chris Moyles Show holds the title of the longest running breakfast show in Radio 1's history, having overtaken original Radio 1 breakfast show presenter Tony Blackburn's tenure of five years between 1967 and 1973.

=== Format ===
The original Radio 1 show lasted for three and a half hours, with news and sport read half-hourly between 06:30 and 10:00, except at 09:00. Starting on 1 January 2007, the show began with the "Cheesy Song", an opening song performed by session singer Richard Oliver in the style of the "Station Song" jingles which were commonly used in radio before the advent of 24-hour broadcasting. Starting on 5 January 2009, the song had its own day, for example, if it was Wednesday, it would go "the Wednesday Cheesy Song" repeatedly. A typical half-hour segment contained fifteen to twenty minutes of chat, discussing the team members' lives, Radio 1's features, music or popular culture. There were regular celebrity guest interviews usually between 08:00 and 09:00, with the occasional live music performance and frequent first exclusive plays of new single releases. At 10:00, when Fearne Cotton took over (who took over the slot previously occupied by Jo Whiley from 21 September 2009) Moyles and the team would typically talk to Cotton for the first few minutes. The show relied in a variation of the "zoo" format, with members of the production team, news and sport readers and other studio guests contributing throughout the show.

=== Features ===
- Dave's Tedious Link – this feature was carried forward from Moyles' afternoon show and was a parody of Tenuous Link a feature Jo Whiley used in her show. Each day the feature would include a well-known song. Comedy Dave would start with the Tedious Link song from the previous show and then lead to the next with a deliberately ramshackle and vague succession of linking "facts", some real and some ludicrous. The style was an extreme parody of "bloke down the pub" logic. After the song, any of the real facts contested by the team or listeners were debated while Dave explained and defended his logic. It appeared at 9am on the Monday to Thursday shows, making way for the Golden Hour on Fridays.
- The Golden Hour – a well-established feature, previously on various Radio 1 Breakfast Shows from 1973 to 2001. For the first half, records were played that all charted in the UK Singles Chart in a certain year and listeners were invited to guess the year. The second half contained random songs chosen by each member of the team in turn, time permitting. After a hiatus, the feature returned for a one-off on Friday 22 July 2005 during the "Summer Friday Thing" strand, on a show broadcast live from a canal boat, and then as part of Radio 1's 40th birthday celebrations in 2007. After which it appeared in the final hour of each Friday's show. The final Golden Hour was played on Friday 7 September 2012.
- Buzz Off – this feature took place every morning at 7:20 from the first breakfast show in 2004. The feature consisted of Moyles playing a song from his personal CD collection, and three members of the team (usually Dave, Aled and Rachel) would "Buzz Off" when they wanted the song turning off. Audience participation consisted of a fourth vote, with the vote being "Buzz Off" if less than 50% of the audience voted in favour of keeping the song on. The song would normally be turned off when all three team members and the audience had all 'buzzed off', although Chris often ignored the votes if it was a song he particularly liked, or if he disagreed with the votes. The feature was discontinued after the final show of 2004.
- Rob DJ's Monday Night Pub Quiz –the team played a five-question pub quiz against each other. The questions were taken from a real pub quiz run the previous evening by one of Moyles' friends, Rob DJ, in their mutual hometown of Leeds. Running totals of each team member's recent scores were kept and analysed. Since 2007, the quiz became an interactive feature, with listeners able to play along via SMS and more recently through Facebook and Twitter. A basic rule of the quiz was that the only answer taken as correct is that given by Rob DJ, regardless of its accuracy or clarity. However, inaccuracies or any vagueness in Rob DJ's answers were usually vigorously debated amongst the team, with Moyles usually bearing down for the answer to be taken in his favour. Chris Moyles won the pub quiz in both 2007. and 2008. This feature appeared in Tuesday shows, sometime between 7:45 and 8:15.
- Guess Who – a Twenty Questions-style game amongst the team in which they try to guess the name of a celebrity spotted by one of them. Questions are supposed to be answered 'yes' or 'no' only but more is often given away, usually to stop the process hitting a dead end.
- McFly Day – every Friday (from 22 January 2010) Moyles played "Star Girl" by the band McFly in the McFly day feature. On 10 September 2010 the band surprised Moyles and the team performing a live version of the McFly Day Star Girl at Maida Vale. On the last airing of the show, McFly prepared a tribute song named 'Star Boy'.
- Car Park Catchphrase – two listeners in their cars have to guess a catchphrase answer from an anecdote-style clue. The first to beep their car horn gets a chance to give their answer but a wrong answer will get them frozen out and leave their opponent to guess while more of the clue is revealed. The feature is "hosted" by voice samples of the Northern Irish comedian and original Catchphrase presenter Roy Walker. Simple and reasonably obvious catchphrases are chosen, and the anecdotal clue often involves the fictional character Mr Fish, a reference to Mr Chips from the original game show. The game is played as a best-of-three knockout and the prize is the chance to compete again when the feature returns (though this was usually ignored if the contestants were entertaining enough, usually with Moyles wiping points off), usually in the next show. Car Park Catchphrase was played with for the last and final time between Andi Peters and Alan Carr with Peters becoming champion on Wednesday 12 September 2012, although it did return for one week on Moyles' Radio X show in September 2020.
- Cheggers' Pop Quiz –a play on 1970s television show Cheggers Plays Pop. Within it, Moyles asked two callers questions related to pop music and popular culture. The winning caller (the contestant who had answered the most questions correctly) returned the following day in a "winner stays on" format. On 29 July 2009, Moyles announced that it would be the last edition.
- Face Your Fears – a week-long feature (end of June/early July 2011) that involved team members facing their various phobias. Monday began with the feature being introduced by fellow Radio 1 host Fearne Cotton. Tuesday had Tina Daheley facing her acrophobia by climbing aboard a cherry picker to travel to the BBC Radio 1 buildings roof. Wednesday saw Comedy Dave face claustrophobia by climbing through a "tunnel". Thursday saw Moyles (and latterly Comedy Dave) fight Cynophobia with a police dog attack. Friday saw Aled Jones facing his arachnophobia by holding a spider and Dominic Byrne facing his pteromechanophobia by going out on a plane. He was meant to jump out of it, but he couldn't do it.
- Celebrity Raspberry – in this, a single phone contestant had one guess at the secret identity of the celebrity recorded blowing a raspberry. The competition continued over successive shows until someone gets the correct answer. The winner was awarded with a mug featuring a team member of their choice.
- Westwood's Where am I? – a daily feature in which a pre-recorded Tim Westwood was "in" a certain location and the team had to guess, through a series of clues, where he claimed he was. The feature was the source of much amusement owing to Westwood's inability to pronounce many words and place names, most notably Rio de Janeiro.
- Duck Register – in this feature, Moyles and Vitty read out names of listeners who sent in their name via text message in time to the song "Barbra Streisand" by Duck Sauce. The feature debuted on 27 September 2010.

Numerous other features of past shows include "Celebrity Tarzan", "Celebrity Two Word Tango", "Who Knows Dom?", "One Word Weather with Nelson Mandela", "One Road Travel", "Yesterday's Weather", "Truth or Gunge", "Listen, Watch, Cher", Half Time, when Dave would say "Let's get ready to Ramble!" in the style of Michael Buffer and "Birthday Corner".

Other former regular competitions hosted included Viaduct (named by Simon Mayo when asked for a suggestion about what to call the quiz when Moyles stood in for Zoe Ball on the breakfast show). It was based on a Two Ronnies sketch (in turn based on Mastermind, with a specialist subject of "answering the question before the last").

=== Team members ===
The team members of The Chris Moyles Show on Radio 1 were:

- Chris Moyles – host (2004–2012)
- Dominic Byrne – newsreader and regular contributor (2004–2012)
- David Vitty – so-called "Director of Comedy" (2004–2012)
- Juliette Ferrington – sports reader (2004)
- Carrie Davis – sports reader and regular contributor (2004–2010)
- Tina Daheley – sports reader and regular contributor (2010–2012)
- Rachel Mallender – producer/day producer and regular contributor (2004–2009)
- Aled Haydn Jones – producer/day producer and regular contributor (2004–2012)
- Will Kinder – day producer (2004–2005)
- Samantha Moy – day producer and contributor (2010–2011)
- Freya Last – day producer and contributor (2011–2012)
- Jocelin Stainer – assistant producer and regular contributor (2005–2007)
- Matt Fincham – assistant producer and regular contributor (2007–2012)

=== Contributors ===
As well as the team members, other contributors also regularly featured on the show:

- Paul Turner – voiceover artist who records daily voiceovers for the show (2004–2012)
- Rob DJ – friend of Moyles, host of feature Rob DJ's Monday Night Pub Quiz
- Roy Walker – host of Car Park Catchphrase (2004–2012)
- Andi Peters – former children's TV presenter who frequently appears on the show
- Keith Chegwin – contributor, host of Cheggers' Pop Quiz (2009)
- Jake Humphrey – reported live on the Friday of a Formula One weekend from the track
- Ant Danbury – creator and producer of the Best of Chris Moyles free download
- Suzanne Kane – Irish DJ and Chris's cousin, who regularly contributes to the show, usually over the phone

=== Stand-in presenters ===
Scott Mills covered the programme when Moyles and the team were absent, and presented the programme under the title The Chris Moyles Show with Scott Mills. Mills used most of his own features from his afternoon slot, and was joined on air by radio personalities Rebecca Huxtable, Mark Chapman and Chris Stark.

When only Moyles was away, Vernon Kay or Sara Cox would present in his place, and stay with the usual format of the show.

=== Radio 1's Longest Show Ever ===
On 28 February 2011, it was announced that Moyles and David Vitty would attempt to beat the record for the longest continuous Radio 1 show in aid of Comic Relief. The previous record of 37 hours was set by Simon Mayo from 1999.

Moyles and Vitty began their record attempt on the morning of 16 March 2011. At the beginning of the show, Moyles announced that they would attempt to break the Guinness World Record for "Radio DJ Endurance Marathon (Team)" and attempt to continuously broadcast for 51 hours 30 minutes. At 19:30 on 17 March they were joined by Simon Mayo who held the previous record and also revealed that they had raised £1,009,033. Moyles and Vitty were presented with a cake by Radio 1 controller Andy Parfitt.

On Friday 18 March 2011 at 08:30, Moyles and Comedy Dave broke the Guinness World Record for the 'Longest Marathon Radio DJ (team)' and by the end of the show (at 10:00), they had hit the 51 and a half hour mark. The duo opted to "round it off" by going to 10:30 and thus set a new record of 52 hours. In doing, so they raised a final total of £2,406,648 for Comic Relief, which is an average of £46,282 for each hour they were on air. During the attempt, the duo were joined by many celebrity guests, including Paul O'Grady, Phillip Schofield, The Wanted, Chipmunk, Jimmy Carr, Craig David, Katy Perry and Ricky Gervais. The grand total has since increased to £2,821,831 and with an audience of 2.84 Million, the event was the most popular live BBC Red Button radio feature ever. 3.8 million people watched on the Radio 1 website.

On 18 November 2011, their record was broken by a breakfast show on the German station 98.8 KISS FM Berlin, when presenters Nora Neise and Tolga Akar were on air for 73 hours.

== Podcasts ==
Starting on 28 July 2005, a weekly podcast entitled the Best of Chris Moyles was released containing the highlights from the past week of the show. Originally updated every Thursday, and then Friday from January 2006, the podcast featured highlights from the five previous broadcasts. It was the most downloaded podcast in the UK iTunes Music Store for much of 2005; however, in December 2005, it was overtaken by the Ricky Gervais Podcast. The podcast was regularly downloaded by over three hundred thousand people worldwide. The podcasts also contain original opening and closing links.

From July 2011, the podcast was referred to as a "Free Download" and this was marked by the team on the 24 June 2011 episode.

The current Radio X show has a podcast available via iTunes and RSS.

== Complaints ==
There have been a number of complaints about The Chris Moyles Show on the BBC in the past. These have included complaints of swearing, bullying, racism, homophobia and sexism. Some of these complaints have been upheld by Ofcom, while others were dismissed.

== See also ==
- Folk Face
