= Carrie Davis =

English sportsreader

Carrie Nicole Prideaux
- Born: 24 June 1976 (age 50); Barnstaple, England
- Spouse: Tom Prideaux (2008–present)
- Children: 2
- Presenting career
- Station: BBC Radio 1 (2004–2010)
- Network: BBC Sport (2010–2012)
- Previous show: The Chris Moyles Show (2004–2010)

Carrie Nicole Prideaux (née Davis; born 24 June 1976 in Barnstaple, England) is a sportsreader who previously worked for the BBC News Channel, best known for reading the sports news on The Chris Moyles Show on BBC Radio 1.

== Biography ==
Prideaux attended school at Queen's College, Taunton, Somerset where she obtained 3 A-levels. She began sports reporting for BBC Radio 5 Live and BBC News 24 before making her way to Radio One working within the Newsbeat team. Prideaux joined The Chris Moyles Show and BBC Radio 1 in October 2004, replacing Juliette Ferrington who moved on to work for BBC Radio 5 Live.

Prideaux reports regularly for BBC London sports news and occasionally for Match of the Day 2. She can sometimes be heard match reporting on the BBC's football results programme Final Score. She also narrates for the National Geographic show What Would Happen If.

She left the BBC on Thursday 1 March 2012 after taking redundancy, Her last appearance was on the BBC News Channel at just after 11.30pm.

== Personal life ==
Davis married Tom Prideaux, a Major with the Queen's Royal Lancers, on 3 May 2008 whilst he held the rank of Captain, and later as Major following his promotion to the rank of Major.

Prideaux is a patron for the Veteran Horse Welfare charity, a charity dedicated to the welfare of older horses and ponies. She is a Chelsea F.C. supporter.

Prideaux's final show was on 12 February 2010 when she left the station to go on maternity leave, and to start a new chapter. On 29 March 2010 it was reported live on the Chris Moyles show that Prideaux had given birth to a baby girl named Poppy. She announced in March 2012 that she and her husband were expecting their second child.
