= Chris Moyles =

English radio and TV presenter and author

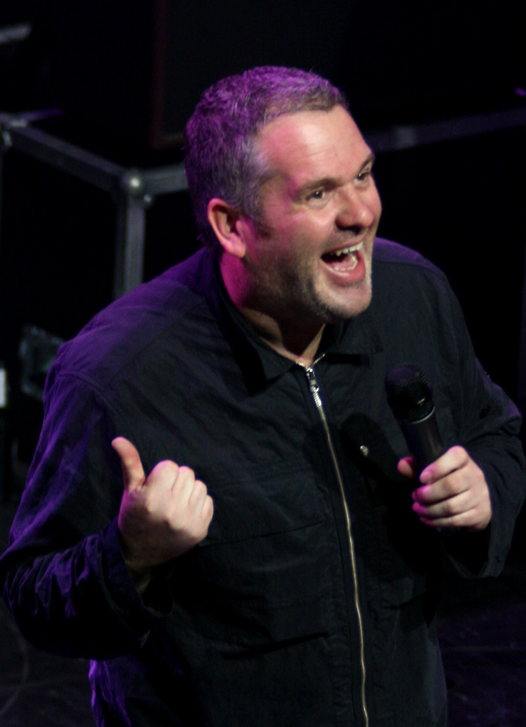
- Moyles in 2009
- Born: Christopher David Moyles; 22 February 1974 (age 52); Leeds, West Yorkshire, England
- Education: Mount St Mary's Catholic High School
- Occupations: DJ; presenter; author
- Years active: 1990–present
- Partners: Ana Boulter (1999–2002); Sophie Waite (2002–2010); Tiffany Austin (2015–present)

Christopher David Moyles (born 22 February 1974) is an English radio and television presenter and author. He presents The Chris Moyles Show on Radio X. Previously he presented The Chris Moyles Show on BBC Radio 1 from 2004 to 2012 and Chris Moyles' Quiz Night from 2009 to 2012 on Channel 4.

Early in his career he worked at various radio stations, including Radio Luxembourg (under the pseudonym Chris Holmes) and Capital FM. Moyles moved to BBC Radio 1 in July 1997 and left the station in September 2012. Whilst there, he presented the early breakfast show, a Saturday morning show, and the drivetime show (from September 1998 to December 2003), before presenting the breakfast show from 5 January 2004 to 14 September 2012. Moyles is BBC Radio 1's longest-serving breakfast presenter.

Moyles became famous for his maverick "bad-boy" broadcasting style on BBC Radio 1 and was embroiled in controversies, including accusations of sexism and homophobia, due to statements he made on the air and in the press.

== Early life and career ==
Moyles was born in Leeds, West Riding of Yorkshire, to Christopher, a postman, and housewife Hannah Veronica "Vera" Moyles (from Dublin), and he was educated at Mount St Mary's Catholic High School. Whilst at school, he began his broadcasting career at WBHS (Wakefield's Broadcast to Hospitals Service), a voluntary staffed hospital radio station in the West Yorkshire city.

After WBHS, Moyles moved to local radio station Aire FM as an assistant for DJ Carl Kingston. During this time, he was also a presenter on Radio TopShop in the Leeds Briggate branch, After hosting his own Saturday Evening Show on Aire FM (and occasionally serving as a stand-in presenter), he was then employed as a presenter at Radio Luxembourg in 1992, until the station closed.

In 1993, he gained a job at the Pulse of West Yorkshire, presenting the evening show from 7.00 pm–10.00 pm. He remained there until early 1994 when he was dismissed for comments made about the station's previous programme controller. Moyles subsequently joined Signal 1 in Stoke-on-Trent – again presenting The Evening Bit from 7.00 pm–10.00 pm. He remained there until he was dismissed by the station's programme controller, who he refers to as a "spineless bastard" in his first autobiography. In 1995 Moyles was heard on the Chiltern Radio Network, presenting the evening show from 7.00 pm–10.00 pm, before taking on the late show from 10.00 pm–1.00 am. This show was simulcast on Horizon Radio, Chiltern Radio, Severn Sound and Northants 96.

In 1996, Moyles joined London station Capital FM, hosting his weekend show The Late Bit, which went out on Friday and Saturday evenings, and covering for other DJs. It was at Capital that Moyles fell out with fellow DJ Neil Fox. After declining the offer of presenting the breakfast show on rival station Kiss 100, Moyles joined Radio 1 in July 1997.

== Radio 1 ==
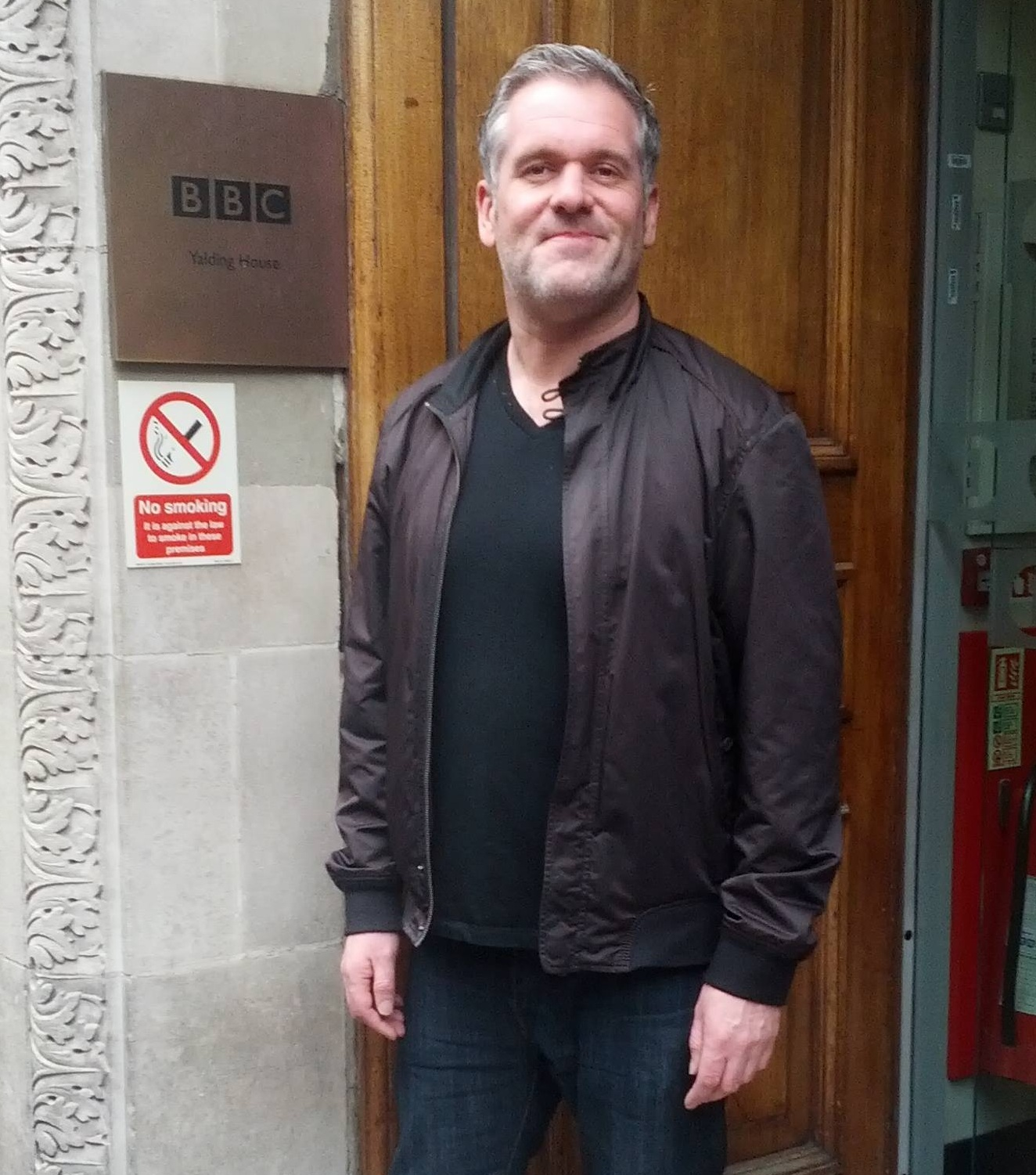
Moyles at his BBC Radio 1 studio

Moyles was voted one of the Faces for 97 by SKY magazine and presented his first show on Radio 1 on 28 July 1997, hosting the 4.00 am–7.00 am Early Breakfast show – soon called The Early Bit. In May 1998, his work was recognised with the award of the Silver Sony Awards DJ of the Year, and he was styling himself as 'The Saviour of Early Morning Radio'. Within the year Moyles was promoted to a Saturday breakfast, then Saturday mid-morning slot from 10.00 am–1.00 pm. At Radio 1, he presented most of his shows with David "Comedy Dave" Vitty, who worked behind the scenes at the station before Moyles' arrival, including a role as the Head of Comedy.

After standing in regularly for Kevin Greening and Zoe Ball on the Radio 1 Breakfast Show, Moyles' next promotion came in October 1998 when he took control of the drivetime show from 4.00 pm–5:45 pm. The show was extended to 3.00 pm–5:45 pm in February 2001. Moyles presented the show from 1998 with his sidekick.

On 5 January 2004, Moyles started presenting Radio 1's breakfast programme, named The Chris Moyles Show, switching places with Sara Cox. He had been appointed to increase the ratings for the show and did so, putting on an extra 1,000,000 listeners to the audience in the first quarter of 2004. After a successful first year, Moyles was awarded 'DJ of the Year' by readers of The Sun.

By 2005, Moyles and his team had succeeded in increasing the morning audience, with his programme's audience rising to 6.5 million. This was coupled with an increase in the overall Radio 1 audience share. With 895,000 listeners in London in the third quarter of 2005, he succeeded in overtaking Johnny Vaughan to take the position of the capital's most listened to youth breakfast show. Moyles' audience ratings continued to increase each week and led to him winning a gold Sony Radio Award in 2006 for best entertainment show.

With the release of the RAJAR listening figures on 3 August 2006, Moyles had added a further 470,000 listeners to the Breakfast Show, taking the average listenership up to 6.79 million. On 10 May 2007, RAJAR figures confirmed that Moyles had increased his listening figures to 7.06 million, breaking the seven million barrier for the first time with the station having 10.55 million listeners overall. Moyles again increased his audience to 7.72 million as of 1 May 2008, slightly narrowing the gap between him and Terry Wogan, the highest-rated radio show in the UK at the time. The station's overall listener figure is now over 11 million.

On 12 May 2008, The Chris Moyles Show won its second Sony Radio Gold award for 'best breakfast show'. At this time he was given another half-hour on his show going from 7.00 am–10.00 am to 6.30 am–10.00 am.

On 7 September 2009 Moyles became the longest serving breakfast presenter on Radio 1, breaking the record previously set by Tony Blackburn.

In March 2011, Moyles and his colleague David Vitty beat the record for the longest continuous Radio 1 show, on Radio 1's Longest Show Ever with Chris Moyles and Comedy Dave for Comic Relief. Between 16 and 18 March they beat both Simon Mayo's 1999 record of 37 hours and the 'Radio DJ Endurance Marathon (Team)' Guinness World Record by broadcasting for 52 hours for Comic Relief initially raising £2.4 million, and with an audience of 2.84 million, it was the most popular live BBC Red Button radio feature ever.

On 1 July 2011, it was announced that Moyles would remain within the BBC until at least 2014, ending speculation that he would move to a commercial rival. The deal was estimated to be worth £1 million. This would have allowed the presenter to reach his 10-year anniversary on The Chris Moyles Show. However, on 11 July 2012, Moyles announced that he would be leaving the breakfast show and the station on 14 September. It was announced later the same day that Nick Grimshaw would replace him.

== Radio X ==
On 7 September 2015, it was announced Chris Moyles would return to radio on the newly re-branded Radio X (previously XFM) hosting the new Chris Moyles Show. The show began airing on 21 September 2015 from 6.30 am–10.00 am, returning to his former breakfast slot and going head to head with his BBC Radio 1 breakfast show replacement, Nick Grimshaw. Chris Moyles stated Dominic Byrne, who read the news on his BBC Radio 1 show, would return with him, as would producer Pippa Taylor.

On 19 April 2016 it was announced that there would be an additional pre-recorded show on Saturday mornings between 8 am-11.00 am featuring clips from the week, interviews with studio guests plus new content.

In the final quarter of 2024, the show's audience reached 1.1 million people.

== Work outside radio ==
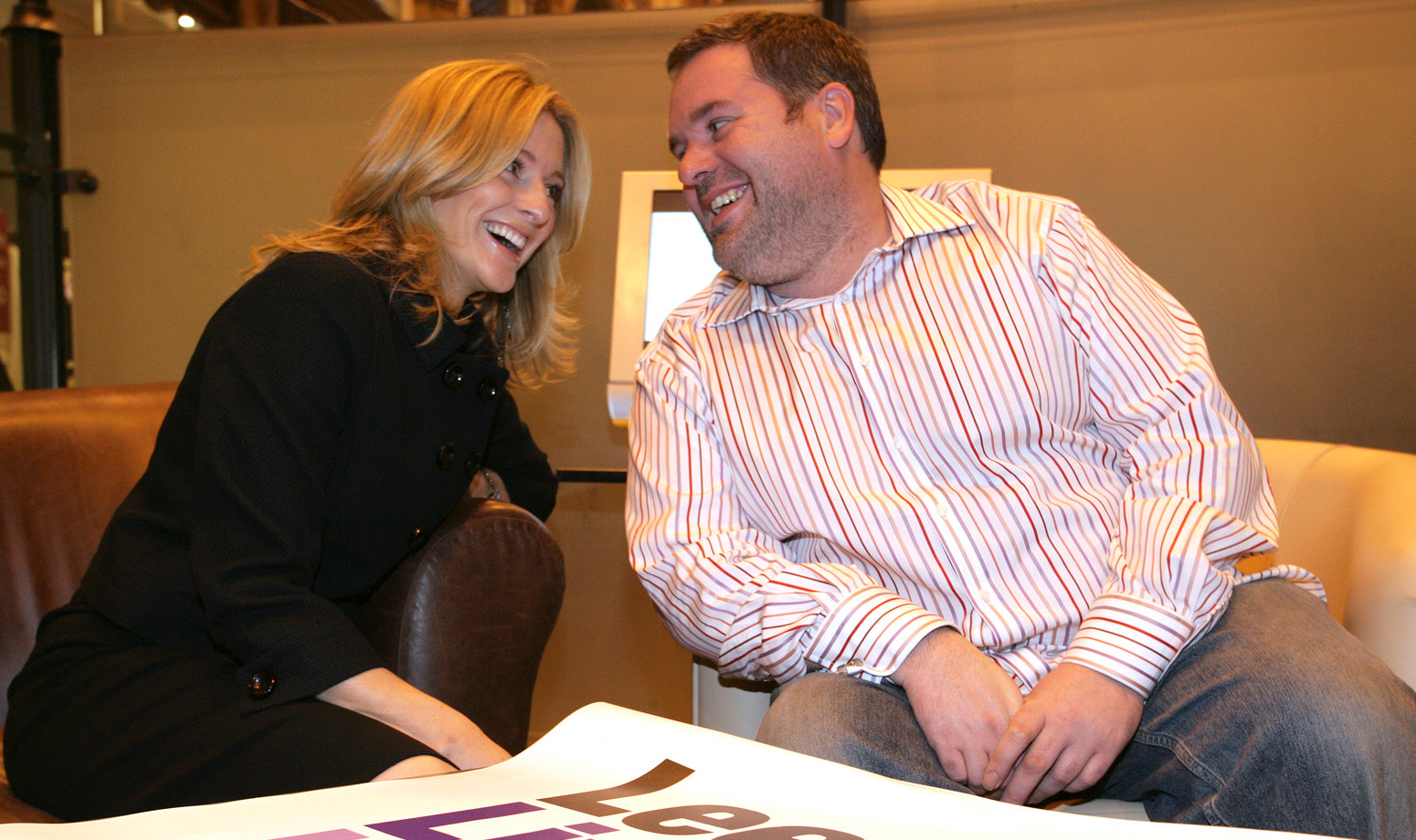
Moyles with Gabby Logan during a campaign to promote life in Leeds

=== BT Red Nose Climb and Speaking Clock ===
Moyles was one of a team of celebrities who climbed Mount Kilimanjaro to raise money for Comic Relief, reaching the summit on 7 March 2009. He was joined by his show's producers, Rachel Mallender and Pippa Taylor, and BBC Radio 1 controller, Andy Parfitt. Also on the climb were Girls Aloud members Cheryl Cole and Kimberley Walsh, Fearne Cotton, Ben Shephard, Gary Barlow, Ronan Keating, Denise Van Outen and Alesha Dixon. He recorded a parody song around this time to promote the climb, mentioning all the names of the people that were also taking part – it was based on Lily Allen's "The Fear", and was called "(A month off of) The Beer".

From 3 February – 23 March 2009, Moyles was joined by Kimberley Walsh, Cheryl Cole, Gary Barlow, Ronan Keating, Ben Shephard and Fearne Cotton to help raise money for charity by reading the time on the Speaking Clock.

=== Film voice work ===
Moyles has provided his voice and/or likeness to a number of films and games. His face was used in 24: The Game, and his voice can be heard in the films Wimbledon, War of the Worlds and Robots. In some of these films, his voice was only used for the UK version.

=== Television presenting ===
Moyles has branched out his work into television. In 2002, his own Channel 5 show, Live with Chris Moyles, ran five shows a week for 13 weeks. Moyles was replaced by Christian O'Connell, before the programme was cancelled.

He and sidekick Dave Vitty had their own TV show, also entitled The Chris Moyles Show like their former Radio 1 show, which was aired from 1998–99 on the now-defunct UK satellite and cable channel UK Play.

Moyles voiced the fourth and final series of Sky1 show The Villa and has occasionally presented Top of the Pops. He has also worked for the Comic Relief and Children in Need charities on their telecasts.

Moyles has presented a number of episodes of Big Brother's Big Mouth. Daily Mirror journalist Rob Leigh once said of his Big Brother's Big Mouth presenting that "Chris Moyles may be Marmite for the ears on radio but never quite nails it on TV, even with his relative star power". He also presented The Big Breakfast on Channel 4 several times between 2000 and 2002.

Moyles launched a new show on Channel 4, called Chris Moyles' Quiz Night on 22 March 2009. The show consisted of Moyles alongside three other celebrities partaking in a traditional pub-style quiz. The original series had the four competing to win an item that belonged to Moyles but this has since developed into a more traditional quiz with the loser singing karaoke-style at the end of the show. The opening show received poor viewing figures attracting just 6% of total audience for the timeslot. It was continued for a second series between 26 February and 11 April 2010, a third series following between 1 November and 22 December 2010 and fourth between 15 July and 2 September 2011. After five series, the show was shelved.

On 24 October 2011, The Metro announced that Moyles would co-present a new dating show, The Love Machine, alongside Stacey Solomon for Sky. Moyles confirmed this on his radio show that morning.

=== Other television appearances ===
Moyles appeared on the ITV show The X Factor: Battle of the Stars and had minor success. He was voted out of the show on 4 June 2006 in the semi-final. Following this appearance, stories in the New Statesman and The Sun both reported that Moyles was looking to relaunch his television career.

Moyles regularly appears on This Morning and Celebrity Juice.

Moyles played himself in an episode of the drama Hotel Babylon which aired on 15 February 2007 and appeared on a celebrity version of Supermarket Sweep that broadcast on the same day. He has appeared as a guest on numerous British television shows, including the ninth series of Top Gear, Never Mind The Buzzcocks, The Charlotte Church Show, The F-Word, The Friday Night Project, Richard & Judy and The New Paul O'Grady Show.

In 2008, Moyles appeared on the Brit Awards to present the award for the best live act, and appeared in the BBC documentary series Comedy Map of Britain. He has appeared on Channel 4's Big Brother: Celebrity Hijack TV programme as well as an appearance as a team captain on the Channel 4 show Alan Carr's Celebrity Ding Dong and on 18 July 2008 he appeared on Jimmy Carr's show on Channel 4, 8 Out of 10 Cats.

On 23 February 2009, Moyles was the guest on BBC One's The One Show to promote the BT Red Nose climb of Mount Kilimanjaro. He appeared again on the show on 26 February 2010 to talk about and promote the second series of Chris Moyles' Quiz Night. In July 2009, he featured in an episode of the genealogy documentary series Who Do You Think You Are? on BBC One where he explored his Irish ancestry. He visited Ireland and Belgium, where his great-grandfather fought and died in the First World War. On the programme Moyles discovered that his surname means bald servant from the Irish "Ó Maolmanach". He also co-presented Children in Need Rocks Manchester in November 2011. Moyles appeared on the quiz show The Million Pound Drop along with Andi Peters in February 2012, they won £25,000 to divide between their chosen charities. Moyles appeared on Behind the Music: Remastered as one of the interviewees for the remastered version of "Weird Al" Yankovic's Behind the Music episode.

Moyles appeared on Children in Need on 16 November 2012, performing Bring Me Sunshine on stage with holograms of comedy duo Morecambe and Wise in an effort to raise money for the charity.

On 31 October 2022 Moyles was announced by ITV as a campmate of the 2022 series of I'm a Celebrity...Get Me Out of Here!. On the promo video Moyles says "It's only three weeks in the middle of a jungle; What could possibly go wrong?" He was voted out sixth on 24 November.

=== Autobiography ===
Moyles' autobiography, The Gospel according to Chris Moyles: The Story of One Man and His Mouth was released by Ebury Press on 5 October 2006.

On 4 October 2007 a follow-up book Chris Moyles: The Difficult Second Book, published by Ebury Press, was officially released. The Difficult Second Book was released in paperback on 1 May 2008. Stewart Lee, on his own programme Stewart Lee's Comedy Vehicle, commented that the title of the book suggests "a degree of irony and self-awareness largely absent from the text itself" and then went on to deconstruct and mock the book's contents.

=== Stage work ===
On 16 May 2012 it was announced that Chris Moyles had been cast to play the part of King Herod in an arena tour of Andrew Lloyd Webber's musical Jesus Christ Superstar. Moyles reprised his role as King Herod when Jesus Christ Superstar began another arena tour on 1 October 2013. Moyles also toured a solo stage show, "Chris Moyles Live", and in January 2026 performed 2 shows at the London Palladium alongside Dominic Byrne and special guests including Chesney Hawkes and Tommy Cannon.

=== Charity work ===
Chris Moyles has supported charities including Comic Relief, Sport Relief, St Mungo's, Break and Global Radio's "Make Some Noise".

== Presenting style ==
Moyles uses a zoo format, and therefore relies on his team members and audience participation for his show's games and quizzes and for other sources of comedy. He is renowned for his boorish manner, quick temper, and put-downs. It is this approach which most commonly leads to criticism of Moyles. It has also caused him to become involved in numerous controversies related to perceived offensive statements. However, Moyles generally accepts counter attacks in the same manner and routinely derides himself for being overweight and so forth, often in the lyrics of jingles. Due to his fascination with radio, Moyles regularly discusses the process of making the show, often spoofing clichéd radio practices. Many of his show's features are homages to or exaggerations of other radio features.

== Personal life ==
Moyles resides in Highgate, London, with his girlfriend Tiffany Austin.

Moyles is a supporter of Leeds United.

== Controversies ==
Moyles has been censured several times by the Broadcasting Standards Commission and Ofcom. This happened during his time at both Capital and Radio 1. For example, the regulatory bodies upheld complaints when Moyles threatened and bullied Neil Fox in October 2002 with the claim that "I'm gonna tear his head off and poo down his neck"; and also in early 2002, when in reference to singer Charlotte Church (a child star at the time), he stated that he "[would] lead her through the forest of sexuality now that she had reached 16".

When he first arrived at Radio 1, John Peel took an instant dislike to Moyles and accused him of being a "DLT-in-waiting". Moyles retorted that Peel was a "Kenny Everett-in-waiting, because Kenny Everett's dead and it's only a matter of time before John pops his clogs". In his biography Moyles said that he mended his relationship with Peel and felt a sense of loss that he had not got to know him before his death.

In September 2008, Moyles, along with other British radio presenters, was criticised for on-air promotion of drinking to excess.

=== On-air profanity ===
In February 2006, Moyles apologised, along with the BBC, after swearing when speaking to a caller live on air. He made the outburst while teasing a mother-of-three from Newcastle during an on-air feature which her children had interrupted. "You've got three kids from some fuckin'..." he blurted out, before apologising profusely for his mistake. The BBC issued six apologies, adding that such mistakes could occur during live broadcasts such as Moyles' show. The BBC was later cleared by broadcasting regulator Ofcom over the incident.

In July 2006, communications watchdog Ofcom found Moyles in Breach of rule 1.5 of the Ofcom Broadcasting Code Rules for an incident in which he referred to female listeners as "dirty whores". A listener objected to an item in which the presenter discussed people who urinated in the shower. He considered that the presenter's reference to women who did this as "dirty whores" was unacceptable at this time of the morning.

=== Pay fracas ===
Alongside a number of other Radio 1 and Radio 2 presenters, Moyles crossed a strike picket line in 2005. BBC staff were striking over recently announced job cuts. A report by the BBC Trust on 2 June 2008 revealed that Moyles was paid £630,000 in 2007. Moyles revealed in September 2009 that he took a 20 per cent pay cut three months earlier, quoting the reason "I want to work at the BBC, which is trying to save some of its gazillions". On 22 September 2010 Moyles spoke out on air about not being paid by the BBC in two months.

=== Accusations of homophobia ===
Moyles was accused of homophobia in May 2006, when he rejected a ringtone by saying "I don't want that one, it's gay", live on air. This led to a number of complaints to the BBC. They argued that the use of the word "gay" in this context was homophobic. The BBC governors said that Moyles was simply "keeping up with developments in English usage".

The Programme Complaints Committee said that, "The word 'gay', in addition to being used to mean 'homosexual' or 'carefree', was often now used to mean 'lame' or 'rubbish'. In describing a ringtone as gay, the DJ was conveying that he thought it was 'rubbish' rather than 'homosexual'. Moyles was not being homophobic". The panel acknowledged that this use of the word 'gay' in a derogatory sense could cause offence to some listeners and counselled caution on its use.

In June, LGBT charity Stonewall marched with placards demanding the dismissal of Moyles during Europride in London. According to Stonewall, "Chris Moyles is not helping young LGBT people struggling to come out through his comments". Stonewall gave Moyles the award of "Bully of the Year" at their annual Stonewall Awards that same year.

Those defending Moyles have noted that Aled Haydn Jones, his show's producer who has worked with Moyles since 2001, is openly gay. Moyles was quoted in The Guardian by Stonewall chief executive Ben Summerskill as saying "Yeah, I'm homophobic, I don't like the gays. Sorry, it just does my head in. We have a token gay on the show!" In his book The Difficult Second Book, Moyles says that he was responding to another article with sarcasm, and was subsequently quoted out of context.

Moyles was censured by Ofcom following eight complaints made after a broadcast on 20 January 2009 in which he told listeners it was the birthday of Will Young and then went on to sing "Evergreen" and "Leave Right Now" in a high pitched and effeminate voice, changing the lyrics to references to Young's sexuality. Ofcom stated that the language used could have been "interpreted by listeners as promoting and condoning certain negative stereotypes based on sexual orientation" and whilst acknowledging the intention was to be humorous in their opinion it could have been perceived as "hostile" and "pejorative". The media regulator also said in their view that because of the show's breakfast time slot that attracts a young audience it "had the potential to encourage children to discriminate against others" based on their actual or perceived sexual orientation and "ran the risk of being imitated on the playground" causing "unnecessary distress".

=== Auschwitz comments ===
On 20 January 2009, Moyles made comments on his radio show regarding the family history programme Who Do You Think You Are? and the Holocaust. Referring to his trips while filming the programme, Moyles said "I went off to Ireland and other places to film and unlike a lot of the Who Do You Think You Are? shows I didn't go to Auschwitz. Pretty much everyone goes there whether or not they're Jewish. They just seem to pass through there on their way to Florida". Celebrities featured on Who Do You Think You Are? including Stephen Fry, Jerry Springer and Natasha Kaplinsky, have traced their family histories back to Jews murdered by the Nazis during the Second World War. The BBC released a statement: "Anyone who listens to the Chris Moyles Show will know he has an irreverent style. However, we regret that on this occasion his comments were misjudged and we are speaking to Chris and his team about them".

=== Tax avoidance ===
In 2012, Moyles was involved in a tax avoidance scheme and requested a court order to prevent the press from reporting it, because he claimed it would infringe his human rights. In February 2014 it was reported that he had attempted to avoid up to £400,000 in income tax by claiming losses of £1,000,000 on a used car dealership scheme.

== Discography ==
=== Studio albums ===
- The Parody Album (2009) UK Chart No. 17
- The Difficult Second Album (2012) UK Chart No. 13

== Awards and honours ==
While at Radio 1 Moyles won two Sony Gold Awards for the breakfast show, in 2006 for Best Entertainment Show and in 2008 for Best Breakfast Show. He was also nominated for DJ of the Year in 2004.

In 2019 the podcast of his Radio X show was nominated for Best Radio Podcast at the British Podcast Awards.

In 2007 the rugby league team Featherstone Rovers named their ground after him. Historically known as Post Office Road, it was renamed via a sponsorship deal as the Chris Moyles Stadium.

== Bibliography ==
- Moyles, Chris (5 October 2006). The Gospel According to Chris Moyles. Ebury Press. ISBN 978-0-09-191417-2.
- Moyles, Chris (4 October 2007). The Difficult Second Book. Ebury Press. ISBN 978-0-09-192242-9.

Media offices
Preceded by Sara Cox	BBC Radio 1 Breakfast Show Presenter; 2004–2012	Succeeded by Nick Grimshaw
