= George W. Johnson (singer) =

American singer (1846–1914)

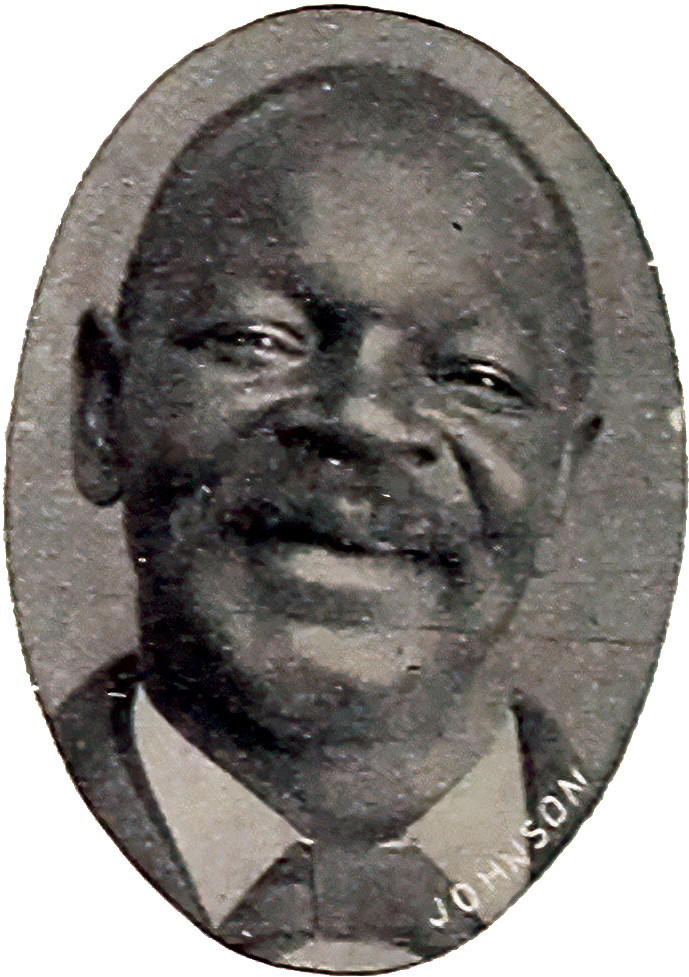
- Johnson in 1898

Background information
- Born: George Washington Johnson; October 29, 1846; Wheatland, Loudoun County, Virginia, U.S.
- Died: January 23, 1914 (aged 67) New York City, U.S.
- Genres: Vaudeville
- Occupations: Singer, valet
- Instruments: Vocals, whistling
- Years active: 1890–1910
- Labels: Berliner Gramophone, Edison, Columbia, Victor Talking Machine Company

George Washington Johnson (October 29, 1846 – January 23, 1914) was an American singer and pioneer sound recording artist. He is known for being the first African American recording star of the phonograph. His most popular songs were "The Whistling Coon" and "The Laughing Song".

== Early life ==
Johnson was born in Virginia, either in Fluvanna County or near Wheatland in Loudoun County. His father was a slave, and he was likely freed in 1853. From an early age, Johnson was raised near Wheatland as the companion and servant of a white farmer's son. During his time with this family, he developed his musical ability and even learned to read and write, which was illegal for a black child in Virginia before the American Civil War. Johnson later worked as a laborer, and in his late twenties he moved to New York City. By the late 1870s he was making his living as a street entertainer in New York, specializing in whistling.

== Musical career ==
An 1890's-early 1900s recording of The Laughing Song, one of his most popular songs

Some time between January and May 1890, Johnson was recruited by two different regional phonograph distributors who were looking for recording artists for their coin-operated machines. Charles Marshall of the New York Phonograph Company and Victor Emerson of the New Jersey Phonograph Company both heard Johnson performing in Manhattan, probably at the ferry terminals on the Hudson River. Both of them invited Johnson to record his loud raggy whistling on wax phonograph cylinders for a fee of twenty cents per two-minute performance. Although Johnson could whistle all the tunes of the day, one of his first recordings for both companies was a popular vaudeville novelty song called "The Whistling Coon". Johnson sang as well as whistled, and also was able to give a boisterous laugh in musical pitch. From this he developed the second performance that made him famous, "The Laughing Song". Although he recorded other material, including whistling the song "Listen to the Mockingbird" and some short minstrel show performances done with other performers, it was these two songs that Johnson would perform and record over and over for years.

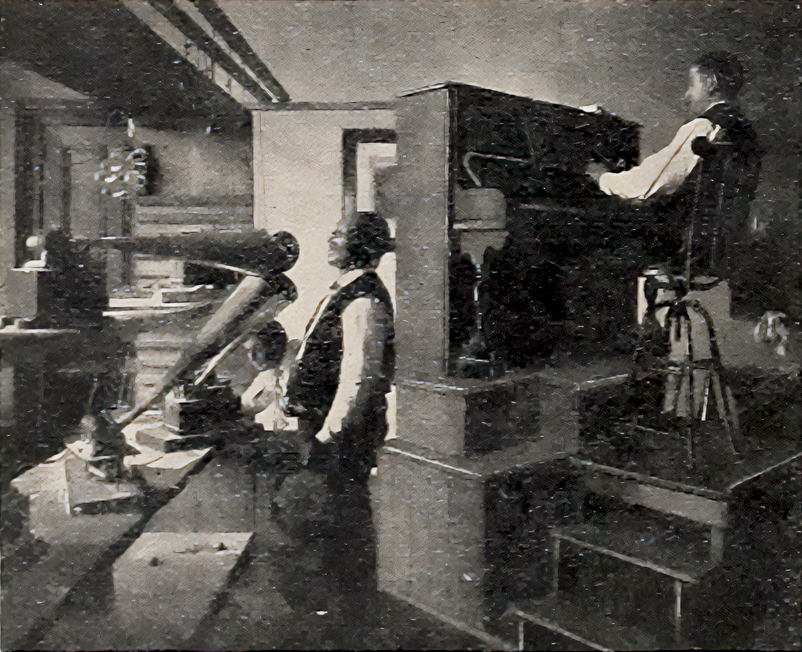
George W. Johnson recording on multiple phonographs at once.

In the earliest days of the recording industry, every record was a "master". A singer with a strong voice could make three or four usable recordings at once, with as many machines running simultaneously with their recording horns pointed towards the singer's mouth. Johnson would sometimes sing the same song over and over again in the recording studio fifty or more times a day.

By 1895, Johnson's two tunes "The Whistling Coon" and "The Laughing Song" were the best-selling recordings in the United States. "The Laughing Song" was number one for ten weeks from April to June 1891, while "The Whistling Coon" was number one for five weeks in July and August 1891. Johnson was the first African American to appear on the pop chart, and his song on the chart was the first to have been written by an African American. The total sales of his wax cylinders between 1890 and 1895 have been estimated at 25,000 to 50,000, each one recorded individually by Johnson. Remarkably, the New Jersey record company marketed Johnson as a black man, during an era when much of American life was strongly segregated by race. "The Whistling Coon" was characterized by a light-hearted tune and lyrics which would be unacceptable today, in which a black man is compared to a baboon.

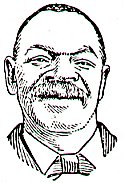
Engraving of Johnson from record catalogue (c.1900)

Johnson continued recording for the New York and New Jersey companies, and in 1891 also started recording for their parent company, the North American Phonograph Company. At least one of his 1891 recording sessions was held at Thomas Edison's laboratory in West Orange, New Jersey. Johnson also made appearances in Vaudeville. His repertory on stage was pretty much limited to his two famous songs, but this was sufficient to get him bookings on bills.

In 1894, Johnson began recording with Len Spencer, a Vaudeville star of the era, and the two would remain friends until the end of Johnson's life. In 1895, Johnson made his first recordings on the new disc technology for Berliner Gramophone. In addition to Berliner, Johnson recorded for Edison Records, Columbia, the Victor Talking Machine Company, the Chicago Talking Machine Company, Bettini and numerous other small cylinder and disc companies through the 1890s and up to 1909 or 1910.

In 1897, Johnson recorded two new songs, "The Laughing Coon" and "The Whistling Girl". They remained in the Edison and Columbia catalogs for years, although neither was as popular as his two original tunes.

== Later life ==
By 1905, Johnson's popularity had declined. New recording technology enabled the pressing of thousands of duplicate records from a single master, and Johnson was no longer needed to record each copy individually. His friend Len Spencer, now a successful artist and booking agent, hired Johnson as an office doorman. Johnson worked for Spencer and lived in his office building for several years, then moved back to Harlem. Johnson died from pneumonia and myocarditis on January 23, 1914 in New York City at the age of 67. He was buried in an unmarked grave in Maple Grove Cemetery in Kew Gardens, Queens, New York.

== Personal life and rumors ==
False rumors have circulated that Johnson died either in a racially motivated lynching, or alternatively that he was hanged after he committed murder. While neither story is true, Johnson did have an 'eventful' personal life. There is no evidence that he ever legally married or had any children, but Johnson did have at least two 'common-law wives', who both died while living with him. The first, an unnamed "German woman", was found dead in their apartment on West 39th Street in late 1894 or early 1895. No charges were filed. The second, Roskin Stuart, was found beaten and unconscious in their apartment on West 41st Street on October 12, 1899. Stuart was taken to the hospital and died a few hours later. Johnson was tried for first-degree murder and found not guilty.

== Honors ==
In 2013 the Maple Grove Historical Preservation Society began a campaign to honor Johnson, and received a grant from the MusiCares Foundation to erect a plaque on his grave site. On April 12, 2014, a century after his death, the singer was finally recognized in a ceremony including displays, presentations and a performance by actor Larry Marshall who impersonated Johnson.

Also in 2013, his c. 1896 recording of "The Laughing Song" was inducted into the Library of Congress' National Recording Registry.
