= Dominic Byrne =

British television presenter, (born 1972)

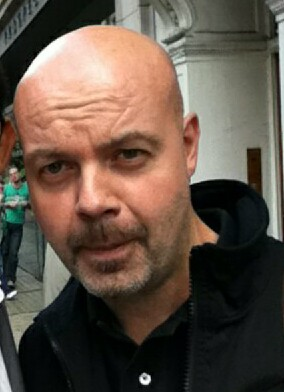
- Byrne outside BBC Radio 1 in 2010
- Born: Dominic Anthony Byrne; 10 November 1972 (age 53); Norwich, England
- Spouse(s): Nicola Byrne (m. 2001; died 2018) Lucy Brigden (m. 2022)
- Children: 3
- Presenting career
- Show: The Chris Moyles Show
- Station: Radio X
- Time slot: 6.30 am – 10 am
- Style: Newscaster
- Country: United Kingdom
- Website: www.radiox.co.uk

Dominic Anthony Byrne (born 10 November 1972) is a British newsreader, presenter, songwriter, musician, and professional comedian. Byrne currently works on the Chris Moyles Breakfast show on Radio X, having previously worked as the newsreader for Capital London on the Capital FM Breakfast Show. Prior to this he worked with the BBC from 1997 to 2012, as part of the on-air team on The Chris Moyles Show on BBC Radio 1 from 2004 to 2012, working as the newsreader and contributing to the show's zoo format.

Byrne worked as a newsreader elsewhere on Radio 1, and presented on the BBC News Channel. He runs his own voice training business called Open Mouth Productions. During 2014 Byrne presented a number of shows on BBC Radio Kent covering other presenters, including Breakfast and Mid-Morning. He returned to the new format of The Chris Moyles Show on Radio X in 2015, reading the news and contributing to show discussions and features.

== Biography ==
Byrne was born in Norwich, Norfolk, After moving to London he freelanced at Independent Radio News and Virgin Radio.

=== BBC ===
He joined BBC Radio 1 in 1997, and became part of the team in the zoo format Chris Moyles Show. As well as reading news, Byrne interviewed many celebrities for the breakfast show including Tom Cruise, Gwyneth Paltrow, Ben Stiller, Alan Sugar, David Schwimmer, Uma Thurman, Goldie Lookin' Chain, Reese Witherspoon, William Shatner, Al Gore, Dion Dublin, Richard E. Grant, Daniel Craig, Bruce Willis, Bono, Adam Clayton, Daniel Radcliffe, Robert Downey Jr., Jennifer Aniston, Jedward, Leonardo DiCaprio, Matt Damon, Jennifer Lopez, Elton John and Cameron Diaz. He contributed to multiple features, and parody songs, some of which featured on The Parody Album released by Chris Moyles.

Elsewhere for the BBC he worked as a newsreader for Jo Whiley's later Fearne Cotton's mid-morning weekday show on Radio 1. From 2007 he presented the Newsbeat's Oddbox video clip show on BBC News. This was a four-minute video which looked at the week's strangest news, presented by Dominic Byrne (and Natalie Jamieson when he was away). It was available to watch at BBC Online, on the BBC Red Button and on the BBC News channel. It was announced on 6 September 2012 episode that the broadcast on the following week would be the final ever Odd Box. On 14 September 2012, The Oddbox's final episode was shown on BBC Radio 1's Newsbeat Website. In addition, Byrne presented Dragon's Den Online, the online spin-off from the Dragons' Den TV programme. In 2014, he was one of three hosts on Factomania.

=== Other projects ===
In December 2011 Dominic Byrne championed the song Dominick the Donkey by the late Italian-American singer Lou Monte on The Chris Moyles Show, helping it achieve a peak chart position of number 3 on the UK Top 40 during Christmas 2011.

Byrne has worked on various voice-over projects. He provided the voice of an alien called Zorst in the CBeebies show Space Pirates, and as Captain Emergency on Peppa Pig. He does voice-overs for the entertainment channel Watch. In 2010, Byrne narrated children's storybooks for mobile phone applications under the iStorytime brand – the titles which Byrne narrated include Invisible Alligators (written and illustrated by Hayes Roberts), Inca Dink, the Great Houndini (written, illustrated and also narrated by M. Nicole van Dam), and Olivia the Octopus (written and illustrated by Damien Clenet).

On 8 March 2013, it was announced that Byrne had joined Capital FM London, to read the news on their flagship breakfast show.

Byrne owns a company called Open Mouth Productions, through which he provides vocal training for both corporate and private individuals.

In a video recorded for Radio X's YouTube channel, Byrne played guitar with Stereophonics alongside Chris Moyles on the drums.

== Music career ==
In January 2023, Byrne released a song called Holy Water (featuring Abigail Dhese-Biggs on vocals) which he had written at least two decades prior. With the support of a campaign on Moyles' breakfast show, the single reached number one on the iTunes chart, and ninety-seven in the official charts. It was the second highest new entry in the UK Big Top 40 chart, at number 23. On 22 May 2023, Byrne released the single "Happier Now", again featuring singer Abigail Dhese-Biggs.

== Discography ==
=== As main artist ===
List of singles, with selected chart positions
Title	Year	Peak chart positions]		Album
Title	Year	UK		Album
UK
"Holy Water" (feat. Abigail DB)	2023	97		Non-album singles
"Happier Now" (feat. Abigail DB)	2023	-	2	Non-album singles
