= Aled Haydn Jones =

Head of BBC Radio 1

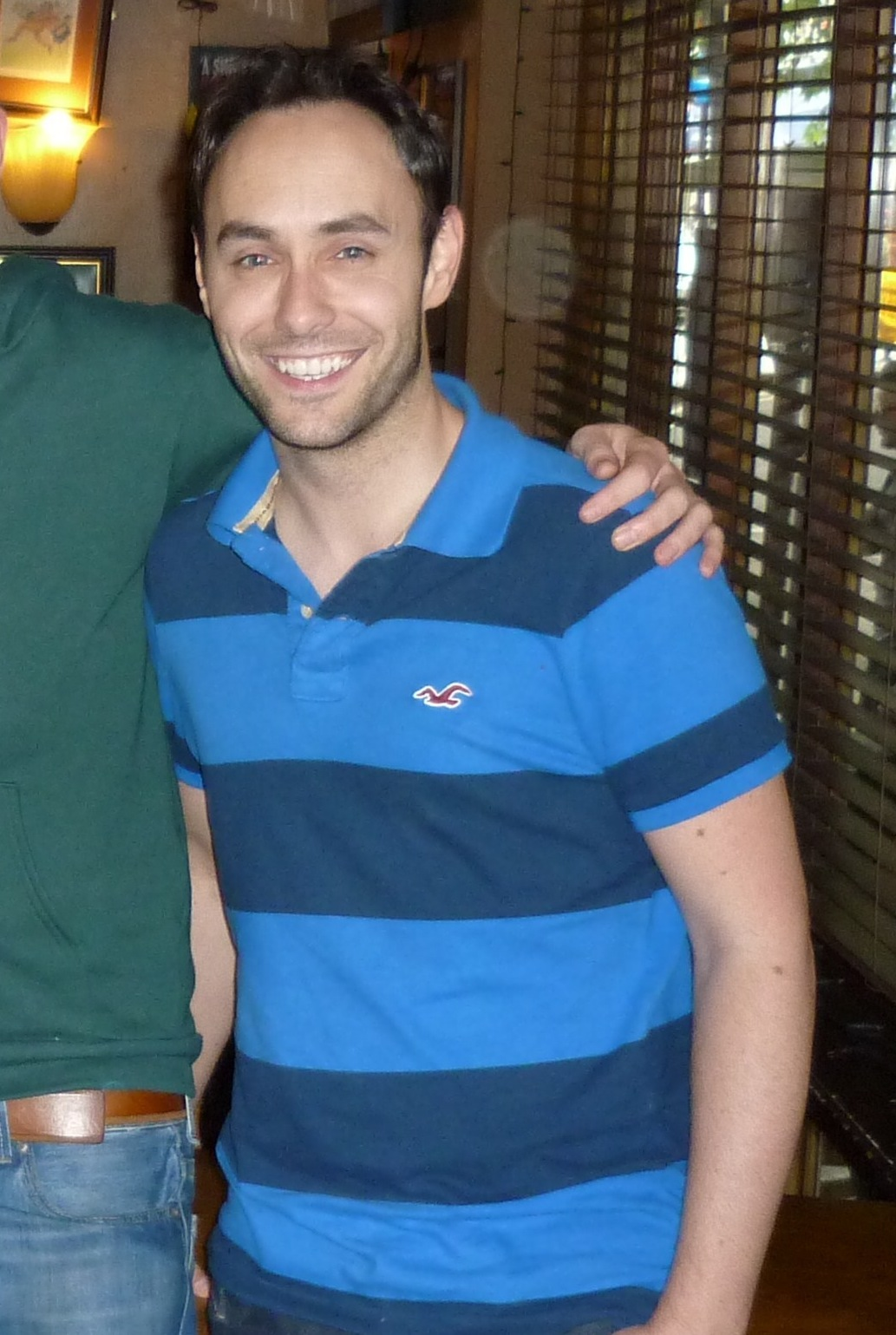
- Aled Haydn Jones
- Born: 9 August 1976 (age 50); Aberystwyth, Wales, United Kingdom
- Presenting career
- Station: BBC Radio 1

Aled Haydn Jones (born 9 August 1976) is a British radio executive, former presenter and former radio producer. In June 2020, he was appointed head of BBC Radio 1, succeeding Ben Cooper. From 2004 until 2012, he worked on The Chris Moyles Show. He was a presenter on The Surgery on BBC Radio 1 between 2009 and 2015. After a stint as an editor, Jones was appointed Head of Programmes in 2017.

== Personal life ==
Jones was born to Hayden and Ann Jones in Aberystwyth, Wales, in 1976. He has a younger sister named Meleri. Jones is a fluent Welsh speaker. He attended Ysgol Gymraeg Aberystwyth, a Welsh-medium primary school, and Ysgol Gyfun Penweddig Welsh medium secondary before going on to complete a BTEC qualification in Media studies at Swansea College. He currently lives in London.

Jones is openly gay. In August 2016 Jones confirmed on Twitter that his long-term partner, Emile, proposed to him on his 40th birthday.

In February 2021 S4C broadcast the Welsh-language documentary DRYCH: Ti, Fi a'r Fam Fenthyg ("You, me and the surrogate") which tracked Jones and Emile as they were trying to become parents with the help of Surrogacy UK. The follow-up documentary DRYCH: Ti, Fi a'r Babi ("You, me and the baby"), broadcast in June 2022 revealed all that had happened since.

== Radio career ==
Jones started his radio career at the age of 14 on hospital radio when he presented a slot on Bronglais Hospital's station Radio Bronglais. He later moved to a commercial radio station called Radio Ceredigion which was launched in 1992.

Jones joined BBC Radio 1 in 1998 when he worked as a broadcast assistant on the Radio 1 Roadshow. He joined just as the show was in its final year and was soon to meet Chris Moyles as he was booking bands and transport for the roadshow.

As well as working as a producer of The Chris Moyles Show, Jones has presented Radio 1's The Surgery on Sunday night as part of the BBC Switch strand.

=== The Surgery ===
The Surgery was a British radio show that aired on BBC Radio. In 2008, Jones was a regular presenter on Radio 1's Sunday Surgery, providing cover for Kelly Osbourne while she was ill. In autumn 2008, it was announced that Osbourne would be taking a break from the Sunday Surgery in order to film Osbournes Reloaded in the US with the rest of her family, and Jones became the regular presenter. In 2013 Jones was given a co-host, Dr Radha Modgil. In April 2015 it was announced that Jones would be stepping down from his role, being replaced by Gemma Cairney from June 2015.

== Working with Chris Moyles ==
Jones's first role with Chris Moyles was doing general tasks behind the scenes on Chris's One Big Belly Tour.

In 2001, whilst discussing the events of an episode of Big Brother Series 2, Chris asked Jones to present it in the form of a proper review. This developed into a daily review spot, earning Jones the nickname "BB Aled" and an invitation to the official eviction press conferences on Friday night.

In August 2002, Jones joined Chris's afternoon show on a permanent basis, taking over from Lizzie Buckingham as a broadcast assistant. Jones gained his second nickname "FA Aled" shortly after, as he reported on the events of reality show Fame Academy in the same way.

Jones worked closely with the show's main producer, Rachel Jones, to oversee the launch of The Chris Moyles Show in its new breakfast slot. In 2005, he was given the role of Day Head Producer and in 2009 took over Rachel's position of Head Producer of The Chris Moyles Show.

Jones's role as producer ended on 14 September 2012 when Nick Grimshaw replaced Chris Moyles on the Radio 1 Breakfast Show.

== Film and television ==
In addition to his career on Radio 1, he has also been a judge on the S4C Welsh language talent show, Wawffactor. He appeared as an extra in season four of 24, in episode 23, and was voted Rear of the Year in 2004.

In November 2007, Jones appeared as a contestant in the BBC Three series Celebrity Scissorhands, in aid of charity Children in Need. The contestants had to learn how to cut hair and give various beauty salon treatments on volunteers, with a minimal amount of training. Jones eventually finished second in the contest, losing in the final to comedian Ninia Benjamin.

In March 2011, Jones was part of the ITV2 show, OMG with Peaches Geldof in which he, alongside Geldof, looked at understanding alternative lifestyles and subcultures.

In November 2011, Jones was a panellist on ITV2's I'm a Celebrity...Get Me Out of Here! Now! for one week giving his views on life in the jungle.
