= Sugarscape (magazine) =

British magazine for teenage girls, 1994–2016

- Editor: Annabel Brog
- Former editors: Claire Irvin; Jennifer Cawthron (née Stringer); Sarah Pyper; Marina Gask; Kathryn Brown
- Categories: Teen magazine
- Frequency: Monthly
- Circulation: 113,320
- Publisher: Rita Lewis
- First issue: October 1994
- Final issue: April 2011
- Company: Hearst Magazines UK
- Country: United Kingdom
- Based in: London
- Language: English
- Website: sugarscape.com
- ISSN: 1355-9672

Sugarscape (sometimes referred to SugarScape or Sugar) was a British magazine for teenage girls published by Hachette Filipacchi. Its content focused on boys, fashion, celebrities, real-life stories about teenagers and other similar matters. The editor, when it closed in 2011, was Annabel Brog. The brand lived on until 2016 through the website sugarscape.com. Aimed at females 16–24, it was edited by Kate Lucey.

== Content ==
Sugar dealt with the concerns of teenage girls. The magazine featured an advice column that answers questions sent in by readers, typically dealing with relationships, body image and health issues.

Sugar ran a nationwide model competition every year, giving one lucky teen the opportunity to win a modelling contract.

On the cover of the main magazine was a female celebrity. Also with the magazine came a free LAD mag, which contained posters and gossip about boys.

In 2007, Sugar established a website, "Sugarscape", which contained celebrity gossip and exclusive competitions and was seen as a brand extension to the magazine.

== History ==
Sugar magazine was launched in October 1994, published by Attic Futura. The first edition, November 1994, was an immediate success, reaching a circulation of 205,000 exceeding its initial circulation target by 55,000. It soon overtook its main rival, Just Seventeen. Like competing titles at the time, Sugar used explicit sexual editorial to attract readership. This was controversial and contributed to the establishment of the Teenage Magazine Arbitration Panel in 1996. Sales peaked in 1997, after which demand for teen mags generally, Sugar included, began to go into decline due to the rising influence of digital media. In 2002, Attic Futura was bought by Hachette. Sugar finally lost its number one market lead position in 2006 to rival magazine Bliss.

In January 2011, Hachette announced its intention to close Sugar magazine in March 2011 as part of a proposed sale of the group's magazine titles to Hearst Corporation, due to the decline of subscribers over the previous five years from 250,099 to 113,320 according to ABC. The website, however, would be retained.

In December 2016, Sugarscape.com announced it was closing down. The domain now redirects to Cosmopolitan magazine.

== Editors ==
The title has had several editors over the years. Founder editor was Kathryn Brown who established the magazine based on the success of Girlfriend that she had helped launch in Australia with the co-founder of Attic Futura, Steve Bush. Former features editor and assistant editor, Marina Gask, took over as editor in November 1996. Sarah Pyper succeeded her following Gask's departure in 1998. Pyper left in August 1999 and was replaced by Jennifer Stringer who had formerly worked on BBC spin-off magazines from TV shows Live & Kicking and Top of the Pops. Following marriage, Jennifer Cawthron, left in 2001 and went on to edit Sneak magazine. Claire Irvin was appointed editor in 2003 having been acting editor since Cawthron's departure. With Irvin's departure in late 2003, Nick Chalmers was appointed acting editor until appointment of former deputy editor of Bliss, Annabel Brog, in 2004.
