= Yinka Bokinni =

British radio and television presenter (born 1989)

- Born: Olayinka Leigh C Bokinni; 16 February 1989 (age 37); Peckham, London, England
- Occupations: Radio and television presenter
- Years active: 2015–present
- Employers: Capital; BBC; Channel 4
- Children: 1
- Relatives: Kola Bokinni (brother)

Olayinka Leigh C Bokinni (born 16 February 1989) is a British radio and television presenter. She is known for presenting various shows on Capital Xtra (2016–2022) and BBC Radio 1 (2023–present). She has also fronted the documentaries Damilola: The Boy Next Door and How to Hire a Hitman, as well as co-presenting True Crime: Unravelled and Naked Education for Channel 4.

== Early life ==
Olayinka Leigh C Bokinni was born on 16 February 1989 in Peckham, London, to an Irish mother and a Nigerian father. Her younger brother Kola is an actor, known for his role in the Apple TV+ series Ted Lasso. As a child, Bokinni was friends with her neighbour Damilola Taylor, who was stabbed to death near their estate in November 2000. Before her broadcasting career, Bokinni obtained a law degree at University College London, but she later realised that she had no desire to become a lawyer.

== Career ==
=== Radio ===
In 2015, Bokinni auditioned for Rinse FM, regularly presenting Saturday shows before becoming the host of her own show Breakfast with Yinka. In 2016, Bokinni joined the radio station Capital Xtra, and presented the Capital Xtra Evening Show for three years. In 2019, it was announced that Bokinni would co-host the Capital Xtra Breakfast Show alongside Shayna Marie. She presented the show until 2022, when she left to focus on other projects. Bokinni also served as a DJ on the main stage of Wireless Festival for several years. In June 2023, Bokinni was announced to be joining BBC Radio 1 to co-present Radio 1 Early Breakfast alongside Conor Knight. Upon joining the network, Bokinni said she was "beyond excited to start this new chapter at BBC Radio 1, adding that "music is the heartbeat of [her] life".

=== Television ===
In November 2017, Bokinni presented the MOBO Awards in Leeds. In 2019, she began presenting Fresh Forward on 4Music, which featured new artists and music. In October 2020, Bokinni fronted a Channel 4 documentary Damilola: The Boy Next Door, about the killing of her friend and neighbour Damilola Taylor, twenty years on from his death. In September 2021, she co-presented a one-off late night chat show Unapologetic with Zeze Millz as part of Channel 4's "Black to Front" special. The show was commissioned for a full series and began airing in November 2021.

In February 2022, Bokinni presented True Crime: Unravelled alongside criminologist Honor Doro Townshend, which featured the analysis of true crime stories. In June 2022, Bokinni fronted a second documentary for Channel 4, How to Hire a Hitman, in which she investigated into how easy it would be to hire a contract killer on the internet. She also appeared as a contestant on various television shows including The Weakest Link, The Greatest Snowman and The Chase: Celebrity Special. In April 2023, she began co-presenting the body positivity series Naked Education with Anna Richardson and Alex George.

In 2025, Bokinni appeared on Richard Osman's House of Games, winning the weekly competition.

=== Other projects ===
Bokinni has worked with brands including Very, eBay and Revlon, and has promoted products for New Balance, Aussie Hair, as well as appearing at a live event for Boots with Davina McCall to unveil a Christmas gift range. She also worked with Coca-Cola for a festival campaign, in which she presented a digital show interviewing music artists. Bokinni is also an ambassador for the British Heart Foundation.

== Filmography ==
As herself
Year	Title	Role	Ref.
2017	MOBO Awards	Presenter	
2017	When Talent Shows Go Horribly Wrong	Guest	
2018	Doctor Who Access All Areas	Presenter	
2019–2021	Fresh Forward	Presenter	
2020	Damilola: The Boy Next Door	Documentary	
2021	Rhod Gilbert's Growing Pains	Guest	
2021	The Big Narstie Show	Guest	
2021–present	Unapologetic	Presenter	
2022	How to Hire a Hitman	Documentary	
2022	Vick Hope's Breakfast Show	Guest	
2022	Don't Hate the Playaz	Guest	
2022	Tonight with Target	Guest	
2022	The Greatest Snowman	Contestant	
2022, 2023	The Apprentice: You're Fired	Guest; 2 episodes	
2022, 2023	The Great British Bake Off: An Extra Slice	Guest	
2023	Naked Education	Presenter	
2023	The Weakest Link	Contestant	
2023	The Chase: Celebrity Special	Contestant	
2023	Glow Up: Britain's Next Make-Up Star	Guest	
2025	Richard Osman's House of Games	Contestant	
2026	Sunday Brunch	Guest presenter	
