= Radio 1's Life Hacks =

UK radio program and podcast

Radio 1's Life Hacks is a programme and podcast on BBC Radio 1, presented by Lauren Layfield and Shanequa Paris. The show began in 2017, replacing The Surgery in the Sunday teatime slot.

== Format ==
The programme includes discussion of health and social issues such as exam stress, sexual health, alcohol and drugs.

The original presenters were Cel Spellman, Katie Thistleton and Radha Modgil. In August 2020, Spellman was replaced by Vick Hope.

Hope and Thistleton presented their final show in March 2024, shortly after Thistleton joined Hope and Jamie Laing on Radio 1's weekday Going Home show. They were replaced by Lauren Layfield and Shanequa Paris. In July and August 2025, Layfield presented alongside Tskenya Frazer and Yinka Bokinni while Paris was on maternity leave.
