= Vick Hope =

British television and radio presenter (born 1989)

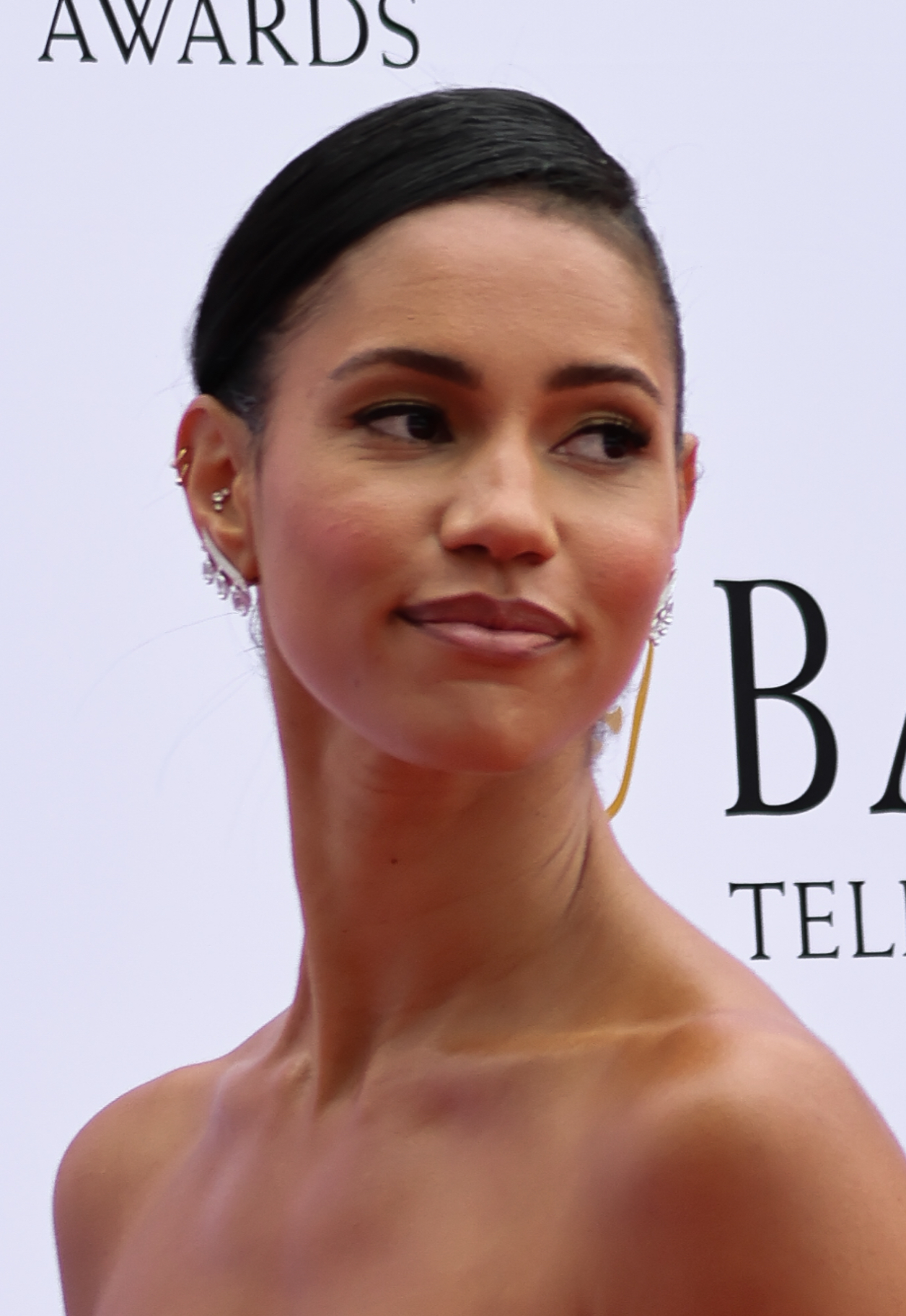
- Hope at the 2026 British Academy Television Awards
- Born: Victoria Nwayawu Nwosu‑Hope; 25 September 1989 (age 37); Newcastle upon Tyne, England
- Education: University of Cambridge, Dame Allan’s School
- Occupations: Television and radio presenter, author
- Spouse: Calvin Harris (m. 2023)
- Children: 1

Victoria Nwayawu Nwosu-Hope (born 25 September 1989) is a British television and radio presenter, journalist and author. As of 2021, she hosts the BBC Radio 1 drivetime show Going Home with Vick, Katie and Jamie with Katie Thistleton and Jamie Laing. The Sunday Times named her a "voice of a generation" when she started at BBC Radio 1 in 2020.

Hope previously hosted the Capital Breakfast show on Capital FM with Roman Kemp and Sonny Jay, Crufts on Channel 4, Carnage on Sky One, Trending Live on 4Music, and FYI Daily on ITV2. She was a backstage presenter for the ITV music competition series The X Factor in 2019, after becoming the digital reporter for The Voice UK in 2018. In 2020, she hosted the red carpet of the British Academy Film Awards. Also for ITV, she hosted the ITV Hub sister show I'm a Celebrity...The Daily Drop (2020) and Vick Hope's Breakfast Show (2022). Hope hosted the 2022 Women's Prize for Fiction podcast series, after she was on the 2021 judging panel.

Hope worked as a print and broadcast journalist for ITN and publications including The Argentina Independent and Marie Claire. In 2017, Hope won the Broadcasting Powerhouse Award at the Marie Claire Future Shapers Awards. She is a human rights activist and Amnesty International ambassador, having worked with the organisation since she was 16.

== Early life ==
Hope was born and raised in Newcastle upon Tyne to English father Nigel Hope and Nigerian mother Adeline Nwosu. She has three younger brothers. Hope studied modern languages at Emmanuel College, Cambridge. She can speak French, Spanish, and Portuguese and has spoken about teaching herself Spanish and taking night classes in Newcastle in extra A-Level subjects to win her place at Cambridge.

Her career began during her university year abroad in Buenos Aires, Argentina, where at 19 she became the youngest ever journalist employed by independent English-language newspaper The Argentina Independent, and it was while in Buenos Aires that she was picked up by MTV to present shows for them. Following that, she broke into the British television mainstream as a reporter and presenter.

== Career ==
=== Radio ===
From 2017 to 2020, Hope hosted the Capital Breakfast show in London along with Roman Kemp and Sonny Jay. Before this, she hosted Weekend Breakfast on sister station Capital Xtra.

In 2019, Hope joined Classic FM presenting Classic FM's Revision Hour alongside Ellie Goulding, Lewis Capaldi and Dan Smith.

In August 2020, Hope replaced Cel Spellman to co-host Life Hacks and Official Chart: First Look alongside Katie Thistleton on BBC Radio 1.

In June 2021, it was announced that Hope would co-host BBC Radio 1's drivetime show Going Home with Vick and Jordan alongside Jordan North, beginning 6 September 2021. North left the station in February 2024, and subsequently Hope was joined by Thistleton and Jamie Laing from 4 March 2024.

=== Television ===
Hope and Roman Kemp have also presented together on ITV2's 2Awesome and Can You Make It for Red Bull TV.

In 2020, Hope hosted the pre-show red carpet for the BAFTA Film Awards. In the same year, Hope presented Channel 4's Crufts alongside Clare Balding. She co-hosted the BRIT Awards 2019 International Live Stream on YouTube with Todrick Hall.

As well as working as an entertainment reporter for ITV's Lorraine, Hope presented programmes for Channel 4's 4Music channel from 2014, including Trending Live! with AJ Odudu and Jimmy Hill, and interview shows Box Fresh, Face The Fans, HotBox and The Hangout, before which she worked on youth and music shows for Disney Channel UK, MTV, Capital Xtra and Vevo.

In 2018, Hope joined The Voice UK as their backstage reporter having worked for ITV on The Hot Desk (2016) and FYI Daily (2013–2018), where she produced and presented the showbiz news.

The same year, Hope was announced to front Sky One's Carnage alongside Andrew Flintoff and Lethal Bizzle. She went on to work further with Sky One and Sky Arts presenting their live coverage of the 2018 Isle of Wight Festival alongside Edith Bowman and Joel Dommett.

In August 2018, it was announced that Hope would be a contestant on the sixteenth series of Strictly Come Dancing. She was paired with professional dancer, Graziano Di Prima and they were eliminated on 21 October, missing out on the Halloween special. Hope controversially criticised her Cha Cha dance exit, blaming judges and production crew for saving comedian Seann Walsh in the dance off. She was the fourth celebrity to leave the show.

On 27 October 2018, Hope was gunged on CBBC show Saturday Mash Up, after losing a vote.

Hope was the backstage presenter for ITV's The X Factor: Celebrity and The X Factor: The Band live final, after hosting The X Factor's spinoff show Xtra Bites.

In sport, Hope presented Yahoo Sports Presents Tailgate – a weekly show about American sports from 2019 to 2020 and Channel 4's World Chase Tag Parkour Championships in 2019.

She also presented cycling coverage of the London Nocturne for Channel 4, Sky Sports and Eurosport, and fronted three series of Street Velodrome for BT Sport. She partook in All Star Netball for BBC's Sport Relief 2019.

In news and factual programming, Hope continues to work as a news and entertainment reporter for ITN. The company also produced her first TV documentary The Slenderman Killings for Channel 5. In the documentary, Hope investigated the rise of online horror, and it was named The Guardian newspaper's Pick Of The Day. Hope also presented the documentary That's Not Me, exploring the use of retouching in fashion photography, which won the BBC Award for Factual Entertainment at the Visions Film Festival.

On 20 October 2020, it was announced that Hope would host two new ITV Hub shows entitled HOW and I'm a Celebrity...The Daily Drop, after the original spin off show, Extra Camp was axed after 17 years on air.

In February 2022, Hope began co-presenting BBC's Britain's Best Young Artist with Kaiser Chiefs frontman and former art teacher Ricky Wilson.

On 12 June 2022, Hope presented the first episode of Vick Hope's Breakfast Show; shown on Sunday mornings on ITV, it features celebrities, summer reading recommendations, and cocktail recipes.

On 13 December 2022, Channel 4 announced that Hope, would join Countdown's Dictionary Corner, which she renamed (via social media) "Vicktionary Corner" for the week.

In early 2024, Hope appeared in 10 episodes of the game show Pointless as a guest co-presenter.

In March 2025, Hope began presenting on BBC's Countryfile.

=== Writing ===
In 2020, Hope released her debut children's novel, Listen Up: Rule the Airwaves, Rule the School.

Hope writes for various publications including Marie Claire, Shout magazine, and New Teach.

=== Other ===
Hope has worked as a live host for a multitude of events including RuPaul's DragCon UK, the Great North Run, Capital's Summertime Ball, Capital's Jingle Bell Ball, and the 2023 Alpine F1 Team car launch.

In 2019, she hosted the Onside Awards at the Royal Albert Hall alongside HRH Prince Harry and Dev Griffin.

=== Awards ===
Hope received a TRIC award in 2019 and 2020 for Best Radio Show for Capital Breakfast. She also received a TRIC award for Best Entertainment Show for Strictly Come Dancing in 2019.

Hope was nominated for Best Entertainment Programme at the 2019 British Academy Television Awards for her work on Strictly Come Dancing.

In 2019, Hope was named "Woman Who Changed The Game" by Nike x Football Beyond Borders.

Hope was consecutively nominated for Favourite TV Personality at the National Reality Television Awards in 2018 and 2019. In 2017, Hope won the Broadcasting Powerhouse Award at the Marie Claire Future Shapers Awards. She has also been nominated for an Urban Music Award for her Capital Xtra Weekend Breakfast show, and a Royal Television Society Award for her documentary, That's Not Me, which won a BBC Award For Factual Entertainment.

== Personal life ==
Hope is a human rights activist and Amnesty International Ambassador, and hosted the Amnesty stage at the 2018 Women's March in London. Hope also works closely with Choose Love (formerly Help Refugees) as an ambassador of their Choose Love campaign. She also works closely with Made By Sport - helping disadvantaged young people through sport, a charity she has been with since launching alongside Anthony Joshua and Prince Harry. In addition to her philanthropy work, Hope also volunteers at a weekly refugee project near her home in Hackney, London, where she works with children from asylum seeking families.

Hope was previously in a relationship with Friday Night Dinner and Plebs star Tom Rosenthal, which ended in November 2017.

In May 2022, she was engaged to DJ Calvin Harris, and they married in Northumberland on 9 September 2023. On 4 August 2025, Harris posted on Instagram that they had welcomed their first child, a son.

== See also ==
- List of Strictly Come Dancing contestants
