= Gemma Cairney =

English television and radio presenter (born 1985)

- Born: Gemma Margaret Cairney; 19 March 1985 (age 41); Birmingham, West Midlands, England
- Occupations: DJ, Presenter
- Years active: 2008–present

Gemma Cairney (born 19 March 1985) is an English television and radio presenter best known for her work on BBC Radio 1 and BBC Radio 6 Music. She most recently presented The Leisure Society on BBC Radio 6 Music where she interviewed cultural icons including Goldie, Tracey Emin, Kelley Deal, Laurie Vincent from Slaves and Cosey Fanni Tutti. She is currently the host of the podcast Dream Space for Factory International. Previously she co-hosted The Surgery alongside Radha Modgil. She has also presented Gemma Cairney on BBC Radio 1, weekends 7 am – 10 am and later weekdays 4 am – 6:30 am, switching with Dev. More recently she has regularly covered for Lauren Laverne, Mary Ann Hobbs, Chris Hawkins, Steve Lamacq, Cerys Matthews and Craig Charles on BBC Radio 6 Music. Cairney is also an Oxfam ambassador.

== Early career and radio presenting ==
Prior to her career in radio, she was an assistant fashion stylist for multiple pop acts. Cairney was a presenter for the Channel 4 Produced Ad funded show called Bite for Ford Fiesta. Then, following a course at Point Blank Music College Cairney fronted several radio shows for Channel 4's 4radio before landing the role of co-presenter for Big Brother's Big Ears for Big Brother 2008 alongside Iain Lee. Cairney began her 1Xtra career co-hosting the Breakfast Show with co-presenter Trevor Nelson.

Prior to starting on BBC Radio 1Xtra, she co-presented the Kiss FM breakfast show for two weeks in August 2008. She co-presented the BBC Radio 1Xtra breakfast show for 2 years before moving to a solo weekday afternoon show on the station from 1 – 4 pm. In February 2012, it was announced that Cairney would take over Weekend Breakfast on BBC Radio 1. Sarah-Jane Crawford took over her slot on 1Xtra.

On 10 January 2014, Radio 1 announced a schedule change that would see Cairney and early weekday morning show host Dev swap shows. They swapped on 29 March 2014.

In April 2015 it was announced that Cairney would take over The Surgery on Wednesday evenings from former presenter Aled Haydn Jones and that Adele Roberts would replace her as the early breakfast show host. These changes took effect in June 2015.

Cairney has presented a number of radio documentaries, including Amazing Grace (2015), What the F: the Story of Feminism (2014), Mali Music (2014),Tempted by Teacher (2014) and Bruising Silence (2013).

In January 2015, Cairney started a production company called Boom Shakalaka Productions Ltd. The company specialises in making various types of content, including podcasts and theatre. Boom Shakalaka produced a successful punk musical about depression at the Edinburgh Fringe Festival 2015 called My Beautiful Black Dog. and a radio documentary for the BBC It's a Dogs Life.

In autumn 2008 and spring 2010 Cairney was the roving reporter for T4's Frock Me, hosting alongside Alexa Chung and Henry Holland. Other TV appearances have included reaching second place on Pick Me MTV and a regular slot as a co-presenter of Channel 4's online series Bite. In November 2010 she was a guest panellist on ITV2's I'm A Celebrity Get Me Out of Here Now! Cairney also hosted the television coverage of 1Xtra's live music events and contributed to the BBC's Glastonbury coverage.

In October 2010 Cairney fronted the Turn Up The Style, Turn Down The Heat campaign for green organisation Global Cool at Britain's Next Top Model Live in London.

== Television ==
Since 2008 Cairney has presented the BBC's Glastonbury festival coverage and in 2015 she co-hosted BBC1's New Year's Eve coverage alongside Nick Grimshaw. Cairney has also presented TV documentaries including Riots: The Aftershock (2012), Dying for Clear Skin (2012) on BBC Three and Books That Made Britain (2016) on BBC One.

== Podcasts ==
Since 2023 Cairney has hosted the podcast Dream Space for Factory International. The podcast asks the question 'what does art have the power or potential to do, when we allow ourselves to dream?' and includes guests such as Maxine Peake, Es Devlin, Jenn Nkiru and Lemn Sissay.

== Book ==
On 9 March 2017, Cairney's debut book, Open: A Toolkit for How Magic and Messed Up Life Can Be was published by PanMacmillan with an accompanying podcast series.

The Paperback, Open Your Heart: Learn to Love Your Life and Love Yourself was published by PanMacmillan on 11 January 2018.

== Writing ==
Cairney has a weekly column in The Observer magazine, "Gemma Cairney on Make-Up".

== Awards ==
Cairney won the Rose D’or Award for Best Music Programme and the Silver Winner for Best Music Special at the New York Festivals World's Best Radio Programs for Amazing Grace on BBC Radio 6 Music presented by Gemma Cairney and produced by Jax Coombes. She is also a Silver Award Winner for Best Music Special at the New York Festivals World's Best Radio Programs for BBC Radio 6 Music's Mali Music presented by Gemma Cairney and produced by Jax Coombes. In 2014 Gemma was given A Women to Watch Under 30 Award at Red Magazine's Women Of The Year Awards. She was awarded Sony Gold awards at the Radio Academy Awards for documentaries Tempted by Teacher (2014) and Bruising Silence (2013).
