= The Sex Education Show =

- Presented by: Anna Richardson
- Starring: Radha Modgil
- Opening theme: "You're The First, The Last, My Everything"
- Original language: English
- No. of seasons: 5
- No. of episodes: 24

Original release
- Network: Channel 4
- Release: 9 September 2008 – 6 December 2011

Related
- Naked Education (2023)

The Sex Education Show is a British sex education television show. It was presented by Anna Richardson and Dr. Radha Modgil and was broadcast on Channel 4. It was designed to speak frankly about sex to teenagers, answering any questions they had about sexual intercourse, puberty, relationships, body image, etc.

== Series 1 (2008) ==
The first series was titled The Sex Education Show. It includes six episodes and was broadcast in September–October 2008.

== Series 2 (2009) ==
The second series was titled The Sex Education Show vs Pornography. It includes four episodes and was broadcast between 30 March and 2 April 2009.

== Series 3 (2010) ==
The third series was titled The Sex Education Show: Am I Normal?. It includes four episodes and was broadcast from 5–8 July 2010.

== Series 4 (2011) ==
The fourth series was titled The Sex Education Show: Stop Pimping Our Kids. It includes four episodes and was broadcast on 19 April 2011, the last episode was shown on 6 December 2011.

This series campaign included the setting up of a Facebook page and a petition. The Facebook page took some criticism for condemning what many believed were perfectly normal children's clothes, and eventually a breakaway satirical Facebook page 'Stop Stop Pimping Our Kids' was set up.

== Series 5 (2011) ==
The fifth series was titled The Sex Education Show. It includes six episodes and was broadcast between 19 July and 23 August 2011.

== Naked Education ==
In April 2023, Channel 4 launched a new educational format of similar nature to The Sex Education Show; again fronted by Richardson, joined on this series by Dr. Alex George and Yinka Bokinni, Naked Education has a title reminiscent of Richardson's Channel 4 dating series Naked Attraction, but is otherwise unconnected to that programme.
