= Henry Holland (fashion designer) =

English fashion designer, businessman, and blogger

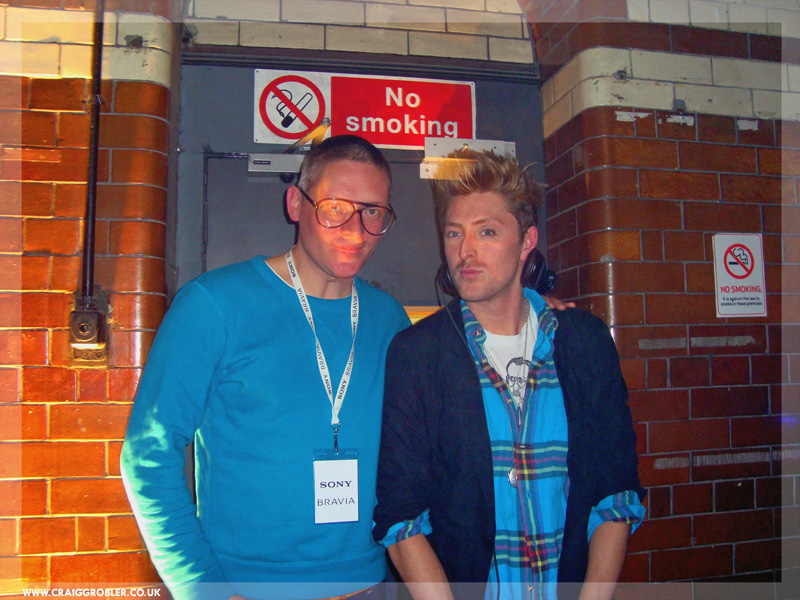
- Henry Holland (right) with fellow designer Giles Deacon in January 2009
- Born: 26 May 1983 (age 42); Ramsbottom, Greater Manchester, England
- Education: London College of Communication
- Labels: House of Holland; H! by Henry Holland
- Spouse: David Hodgson

Henry Holland (born 26 May 1983) is an English fashion designer, businessman and blogger from Ramsbottom, Greater Manchester.

== Early life and education ==
Holland is a graduate of the BA Journalism course at the London College of Communication and has worked for the following publications: the teenage Sneak magazine (fashion section), Smash Hits and Bliss. He is openly gay.

== Career ==
Prior to the launch of his own company, Holland gained attention with his Fashion Groupies T-shirt designs. Holland's range of 1980s-inspired T-shirts displayed catchphrases such as, "I'll tell you who's boss, Kate Moss".

In September 2006 Holland designed a range of T-shirts that were worn by both Gareth Pugh and Giles Deacon as they took their bow at the end of their runway shows during London Fashion Week. Gareth Pugh appeared to take a bow at the end of his show wearing a T-shirt emblazoned with the words "Get Yer Freak on Giles Deacon" while later in the week Giles Deacon wore a T-shirt that had "Uhu Gareth Pugh" printed on it.

Holland subsequently designed a full collection and founded his own fashion house the "House of Holland" in 2008. He is well known for his work with model Agyness Deyn.

In 2009, Levi Strauss & Co debuted a denim collaboration with Holland. Later in September 2009, Holland negotiated a deal with the British retailer, Debenhams, for the creation of a fashion line, "H! by Henry Holland"; the line was eventually sold in Debenhams stores from spring 2010.

For Spring/Summer 2010 he designed a pink wedding dress exclusive to LA-based boutique REVOLVE Clothing under his House of Holland line. Holland's 2011 collection features a number of T-shirts that display acronyms such as "waysb", meaning, "what are you sayin' b****s".

In May 2012, Holland's collaboration with sunglasses company, Le Specs, was released. The collection, entitled "Henry Holland for Le Specs", featured sunglass models with names such as "Muffin Top" and "Blinders". The collection campaign featured Australian hip-hop recording artist and model Iggy Azalea. Following the success of his first two eyewear campaigns starring Iggy Azalea and Ioanna Gika, Holland released his third eyewear campaign, this time featuring model and actress Adwoa Aboah. The range featured a design called 'Cagefighters'.

To mark Magnum's 25th birthday, Henry Holland has created a bespoke 1960s inspired dress complete with mimicked cracked chocolate made from layers of fabric and sequins. Holland follows in the footsteps of notable designers, including Karl Lagerfeld, who have also worked with the ice cream company. The dress took over three months to complete and is now worth around £5,000.

== Media appearances ==
In Autumn 2008 and Spring 2010, Holland co-presented T4's flagship fashion and music series, Frock Me, alongside Alexa Chung and Gemma Cairney. In 2012 Holland starred as a judge on fashion design show Styled to Rock airing on Sky Living. The show, with Rihanna as an executive producer took unknown British designers, giving them the opportunity to design for celebs such as Cheryl Cole, The Saturdays and Katy B. Henry's good friend and self-named "muse". He was also another guest judge on the show Glow Up: Britain's Next Make-Up Star season 2

== Celebrity clients ==
In February 2009, singer MIA wore his black-and-white, polka dot tulle mini-design while heavily pregnant at the 51st Grammy Awards. The design was from the House of Holland spring/summer 2009 collection.

== Influences ==
Holland states that Nicola Roberts, of Girls Aloud fame, is his muse and heroine.

== Administration ==
On 5 March 2020, it was announced that House of Holland had gone into administration. It was further announced that the seven employees of the business would be retained during, and to assist, the administration.
