= List of programmes broadcast by Channel V =

Below are the programmes that had been shown in Channel [V] International in Southeast Asia. Programs that are available exclusively at various Channel [V] affiliates are listed in their respective sections. Selected Channel [V] programs also air on STAR World exclusive for the Middle East viewers only and Channel [V] Philippines.

== Final programmes ==
- The Playlist – A playlist of seven music videos chosen by a viewer.
- Top 5 – The 5 hottest clips of the moment from a specific genre, ranging from dance and rock to urban, pop, k-pop and indie.
- [V] Loop – A program containing 2–3 themes and usually including 2–3 songs per the theme.
- Double Shot – Two music videos played back-to-back that has a connection/link to each other.
- XO – A playlist of alternative music by international artists.
- [V] Morning Fix – Start your morning on the right side of the bed with all the hottest hits.
- K-Pop Explosion – The trendiest and most popular K-pop clips of the moment.
- Videoscope – The best music videos from a specific artist. Usually including 2 of his/her new releases at most.
- [V]S – Ultimate showdown of the best in music as the bigwigs go up against one.
- [V] The Rave – Dance and club music videos.
- VCD (V Countdown and [V] Countdown) – The 10 most popular videos in Asia this week.
- [V] ATM (Asian Top Music) – The most popular videos in Asia of the moment.
- Backtracks (Channel [V] Asia Hits Old and New music videos) – Features music hits from the 1950s, 1960s, 1970s, 1980s, 1990s, 2000s, and 2010s.
- [V] Shot

== Former programmes ==
- 90210^{**}
- America's Next Top Model
- AMP Around Asia ^{+}
- Arcade
- Artist Special
- Australia's Next Top Model
- Bacpackers
- The Bad Girls Club
- Battle of the Bands
- Britain's Next Top Model
- Cactus Garden
- Canada's Next Top Model
- Cash Cab
- Championship Gaming Series^{++}
- Club [V]
- Custom Playlist
- Daily Download
- The Dave & Kerley Show
- Double Day
- The Dudesons
- Fashion Files
- Flava ^{+}
- Fonejacker
- Gene Simmons Family Jewels
- Get Gorgeous
- Hei-Beat
- Hit Rater Countdown
- Hits on [V]
- Hot List
- House of Noise
- I Am Siam
- iTunes 50 Countdown
- The Janice Dickinson Modeling Agency
- Keys to the VIP
- Kung Faux
- The List ^{+}
- Make The Call
- Melo-samosorn
- MXC
- MySpace Mixtape
- New Stock
- Night Shift
- North Shore Boarding House
- Parental Control
- Pop! Goes the Weasel
- Pop on [V]
- Pop on [V] Countdown (renamed Top 5 Pop)
- Popparazzi ^{+++}
- Presenter Playlist
- Rad Girls
- The Record Shop ^{+}
- Remote Control ^{+}
- Rock on [V]
- Rock on [V] Countdown (renamed Top 5 Rock)
- The Rock Show ^{+}
- Scene & Heard ^{+}
- Singing with the Enemy
- South Park
- Saya Mahu
- Soundtrack
- Stylista ^{*}
- The Ticket ^{++++}
- TNA Explosion^{++}
- TNA Wrestling^{++}
- Turn on [V]
- Urban on [V]
- Urban on [V] Countdown (renamed Top 5 Urban)
- [V] Air Chart
- [V] Boutique
- [V] For Me
- [V] Independent Countdown
- [V] Live
- [V] News
- [V] Play Zone
- [V] Plug
- [V] Siam Top 40
- [V] Special
- [V] Tunes ^{**}
- Vanity Lair

(+) – This show was previously shown on Star World both the Philippines and MENA only. (++) – Current shows would also be shown only STAR Sports and STAR World. (+++) – Previously shown on STAR World exclusive for the Philippines only. (++++) – This show was previously shown on STAR Movies. (*) – This show was exclusive for Malaysian viewers only. Also available in STAR World exclusive for the Philippines only. (**) – This show was also formerly aired over STAR World exclusively for the Philippines and MENA only.

=== Former shows ===
The following are former shows of Channel [V] combine programs of the Channel [V]'s Southern Beam (Channel [V] Asia is now separate feed from India which is now Channel [V] International in 1996) including programs from Israel, the UAE and Thailand and the Channel [V]'s Northern Beam (now Channel [V] Mainland China which is now separate to Channel [V] Taiwan Feed in 1994) including programs from Philippines, Korea and Japan. Some common programs in the Channel [V]'s Southern Beam are the same title as the Channel [V]'s Northern Beam but have different VJs as well as program content. For example, the Southern Beam host of Channel [V]’s Big Bang is Allesandra while the Northern Beam counterpart is David Wu.

- 3 For 3
- A to Z of Rock (available on the Channel [V]'s Southern Beam only)
- A Li[V]e (live music videos; exclusively available in Channel [V] Korea)
- Amped
- Artist Versus Artist (available on the Channel [V]'s Northern Beam only)
- Asian Top 20 Countdown
- Asian Chart
- Asian Wave
- Big Bang
- Big Gig Japan
- Billboard US Countdown
- By Demand
- CelebriT[V] (available in Channel V Philippines only)
- Chinese Top 20 Countdown (Available in V Chinese, delayed Telecast in V India with English Subtitle)
- Club X (other previous names as V Spot, now Club V)
- Ek Ka Tu (available in India only)
- The Factory (available in V Chinese only)
- Fashion Police
- First Day First Show (available in India only)
- Flashback (V India's Old Hindi film music videos)
- Frame By Frame
- Gone Taiwan (available in V Chinese only)
- Haysad (available in India only)
- Heart and Soul (available on Channel [V] Chinese only)
- Hello [V] Korea
- India Top 10 Countdown (Hindi and Western videos)
- International Flight (available in V Chinese only)
- Jump Start
- Korean Top 10 Countdown (also known as Top 10; available in V Korea only, simulcast with V Chinese)
- Korean Top 20 Countdown (available on V Korea only, simulcast with V Chinese, now V Korea Countdown)
- Launch Pad
- Lollipop (available on Channel V Taiwan only)
- M&M (available exclusively on Channel [V] Korea)
- Music Master Bos Shoof (Arabic and Western music videos. Available in Channel [V]'s Southern Beam only)
- Music Update Tokyo
- Never Enough
- Over The Edge
- OVO – Our Very Own (Channel V Philippines original Pilipino music videos)
- Oye (India's top 20 Hindi film music videos)
- Radio Jam (available in V Taiwan only)
- Rewind
- The Ride
- The Rock Show (exclusively available in Channel [V] Korea)
- Saya Mahu (Indonesian/Malaysian version of By Demand)
- Show Revolution (exclusively available in Channel [V] Korea)
- Sigaw Manila
- Smash Hits
- Speakeasy
- The Source (renamed as Channel [V] News)
- Talking Talk
- The Ticket
- Time Travel Rewind (also known as 시간여행 Rewind)
- Top of the Pops (available on Channel V India only)
- Turn on TV
- U Rock (available on V Chinese only)
- V at the Hardrock
- V Eco
- V Montahay (Indian version of By Demand)
- V People (available in India only)
- V Yallah (also known as the Arabic Top 10 Countdown, available on the Channel [V]'s Southern Beam only)
- V1's
- VCV (available in Channel V Philippines only)
- Very China (available in V Chinese only)
- Very Taiwan (available in V Chinese only)
- The Vibe
- VJ Weekend Show
- Watch U Want (available in Channel V Philippines only)
- Wu Man Show (available in the Channel [V] Northern Beam only)
- Youth Corner (available in V Chinese only)
- 하지만의 풍류시대
- 新 街YO歌(신 가 요가)
- 대결 맞짱
- 러브 메신저
- 와글와글 문자세상
- 생방송! 문자를 쏘세요
- [V]ON
- Korean [V] Countdown
- Pop Planet
- Starscope
- Theme Music
- J-Pop Street
- [V] Style
- [V] On Movie
- Superstar [V]
- 신난가요
- [V] 매거진
- Fun! Fun! Fun!
- 해피타임
- Urban Nation
- 무방비토크
- [V] Special
- Bowwow [Non-Stop]
- J-Pop Zone [Non-Stop]
- K-Pop 90's [Non-Stop]
- The Record Shop [Non-Stop]
- Double Shot [Non-Stop]
- Freestyle [Non-Stop]
- Electronica [Non-Stop]

== See also ==
- Channel [V]
- Channel [V] India
- Channel [V] Australia
- Channel [V] Philippines
- Channel [V] Thailand
