= Secret Eaters =

- Presented by: Anna Richardson
- Country of origin: United Kingdom
- Original language: English
- No. of series: 3
- No. of episodes: 22

Original release
- Network: Channel 4
- Release: 16 May 2012 – 30 April 2014

Secret Eaters is a British documentary television series about overeating. It is broadcast on Channel 4 and presented by Anna Richardson. There has been 22 episodes spanning three series. In each episode, Anna Richardson meets a group of people; usually a couple, friends or a family, who are overweight. They are then filmed in their homes for a week and followed around by 'private investigators' Cameron Gowlett and Duncan Mee who monitor their every move and record everything they eat. At the end of the week, they are confronted by the presenter about what they eat, shown footage of them eating and told how many calories they have eaten throughout the course of the week. They are also given dietary advice by expert Lynne Garton about what they have eaten.

== Series 1 ==
=== Episode 1: Jill and Stuart ===
- Air date - 16 May 2012

Siblings Jill Hamill and Stuart Raphael in the Wirral.

=== Episode 2: The Castle family ===
- Air date - 23 May 2012

The Castles from Welwyn Garden City.

=== Episode 3: Dawn, Mike and Gareth ===
- Air date - 30 May 2012

=== Episode 4: The Meakin family ===
- Air date - 6 June 2012

=== Episode 5: The White Olivers ===
- Air date - 13 June 2012

=== Episode 6: Ronnie and Stuart ===
- Air date - 20 June 2012

== Series 2 ==
=== Episode 1: Ray and Ange ===
- Air date - 8 April 2013

=== Episode 2: Emma and Paul ===
- Air date - 15 April 2013

=== Episode 3: David and Denise ===
- Air date - 22 April 2013

=== Episode 4: Lauren and Stephanie ===
- Air date - 29 April 2013

=== Episode 5: Hetal and Mitul ===
- Air date - 6 May 2013

=== Episode 6: Daryl and Kate ===
- Air date - 13 May 2013

=== Episode 7: Emma and Matthew ===
- Air date - 20 May 2013

=== Episode 8: Prescious and Florence ===
- Air date - 27 May 2013

== Series 3 ==
=== Episode 1: Faye and Laura ===
- Air date - 12 March 2014

=== Episode 2: Helena and Murray ===
- Air date - 19 March 2014

=== Episode 3: Kelli and Tracey ===
- Air date - 26 March 2014

=== Episode 4: Sharon and Tracy ===
- Air date - 2 April 2014

=== Episode 5: Lorraine and Cori ===
- Air date - 9 April 2014

=== Episode 6: Glyn, Louise and Sue ===
- Air date - 16 April 2014

=== Episode 7: Michael and Katie ===
- Air date - 23 April 2014

=== Episode 8: Allan and Emma ===
- Air date - 30 April 2014
