= The Surgery =

UK radio program

- Other names: The Sunday Surgery; The Surgery with Aled; The Surgery with Katie and Dr Radha
- Genre: Health; Talk show
- Running time: 60 minutes
- Country of origin: United Kingdom
- Language: English
- Home station: BBC Radio 1
- Hosted by: Sara Cox; Doctor Mark Hamilton; Emma B Annie Mac; Kelly Osbourne; Gemma Cairney; Aled Haydn Jones; Katie Thistleton; Doctor Radha Modgil; Letitia SD
- Recording studio: Broadcasting House, London
- Original release: 19 September 1999 – 1 November 2017
- Audio format: FM, digital radio and Internet radio
- Website: The Surgery with Katie and Dr Radha

The Surgery is a British radio show that aired on BBC Radio 1 weekly from 1999 to 2017.

It was most recently hosted by Katie Thistleton and Doctor Radha Modgil, prior to its merger in November 2017 with a new show entitled Radio 1's Life Hacks.

== History ==
The show first began with Sara Cox on 19 September 1999, then was joint-hosted by Emma B. Emma B and Doctor Mark Hamilton then co-hosted the show for six years, before Letitia SD took over the programme. From July 2007, Annie Mac took over the role of presenting from Letitia during the Sex Weeks of Summer, a series of special programs during Radio 1's Six Weeks of Summer, focusing on sex related issues. The show was relaunched in October 2007 with Kelly Osbourne at the helm, but her stint was short lived. She was formally replaced by Aled Haydn Jones in March 2009.

In June 2014, it was announced that starting 1 September 2014, The Surgery would move to a weekly Wednesday night slot, from 9pm to 10pm.

In April 2015, it was announced that Gemma Cairney would present the show from June 2015 to April 2017.

Following Cairney's departure from the station in May 2017, Katie Thistleton took over co-hosting the show alongside Doctor Radha Modgil.

In November 2017, the show was axed in favour of a new show on Sunday afternoons entitled Radio 1's Life Hacks hosted by Cel Spellman, Katie Thistleton and Radha Modgil.

== Format ==
Listeners were given advice, mostly for common adolescent problems, and other listeners shared their experiences and advice and were encouraged to give their point of view. The format was similar to "problem pages" found in teenage magazines. There were also often special shows specifically dedicated to one subject, such as a type of addictive behaviour or dependency. The Surgery had a team of experts on hand to deal with both medical, emotional and psychological problems, including Doctor Radha Modgil and psychotherapist Aaron Balick. After the departure of medical doctor Mel Sayer in September 2012, Sanjay Pawar was announced as the new resident doctor on The Surgery. In June 2013, Radha Modgil became the new resident doctor.

== Outside radio ==
=== Open University TV programmes ===
Four television programmes were made for the Open University about themes which were often discussed relating to sexual health.

=== University tours ===
In October 2005, the programme toured four universities, broadcasting live from student union bars. In September 2005, it went on a 'Sex Tour', discussing sexual health at Yale College in Wrexham.

== Common issues ==
While there was often a discussion 'theme' on the show, it was up to callers and texters to decide what they wanted to ask about.

Personal issues commonly tackled on the show include:

- Bullying
- Gambling
- Self harming
- Teenage pregnancy, abortion, and contraception
- Exam stress
- Sexually transmitted diseases
- Depression
- Sunburn
