= Get a Grip (TV series) =

- Genre: Satire
- Starring: Ben Elton, Alexa Chung
- Country of origin: United Kingdom
- Original language: English
- No. of seasons: 1
- No. of episodes: 6

Production
- Producers: Phil McIntyre Productions/ Big Bear Films
- Running time: 30 minutes

Original release
- Network: ITV
- Release: 4 April – 10 May 2007

Get a Grip is a satirical comedy television series shown on ITV in the United Kingdom. It aired on Wednesday nights in April/May 2007 and was hosted by Ben Elton and Alexa Chung.

The programme was made by Phil McIntyre Productions and Big Bear Films.

The show received an averaged audience of around 1.5 million, usually being beaten by rival channels BBC One and Channel 4. ITV dropped Get a Grip from its 10pm slot due to poor ratings. The programme was moved to Monday nights after midnight for the rest of the series.
