= Anna Richardson =

English television presenter (born 1970)

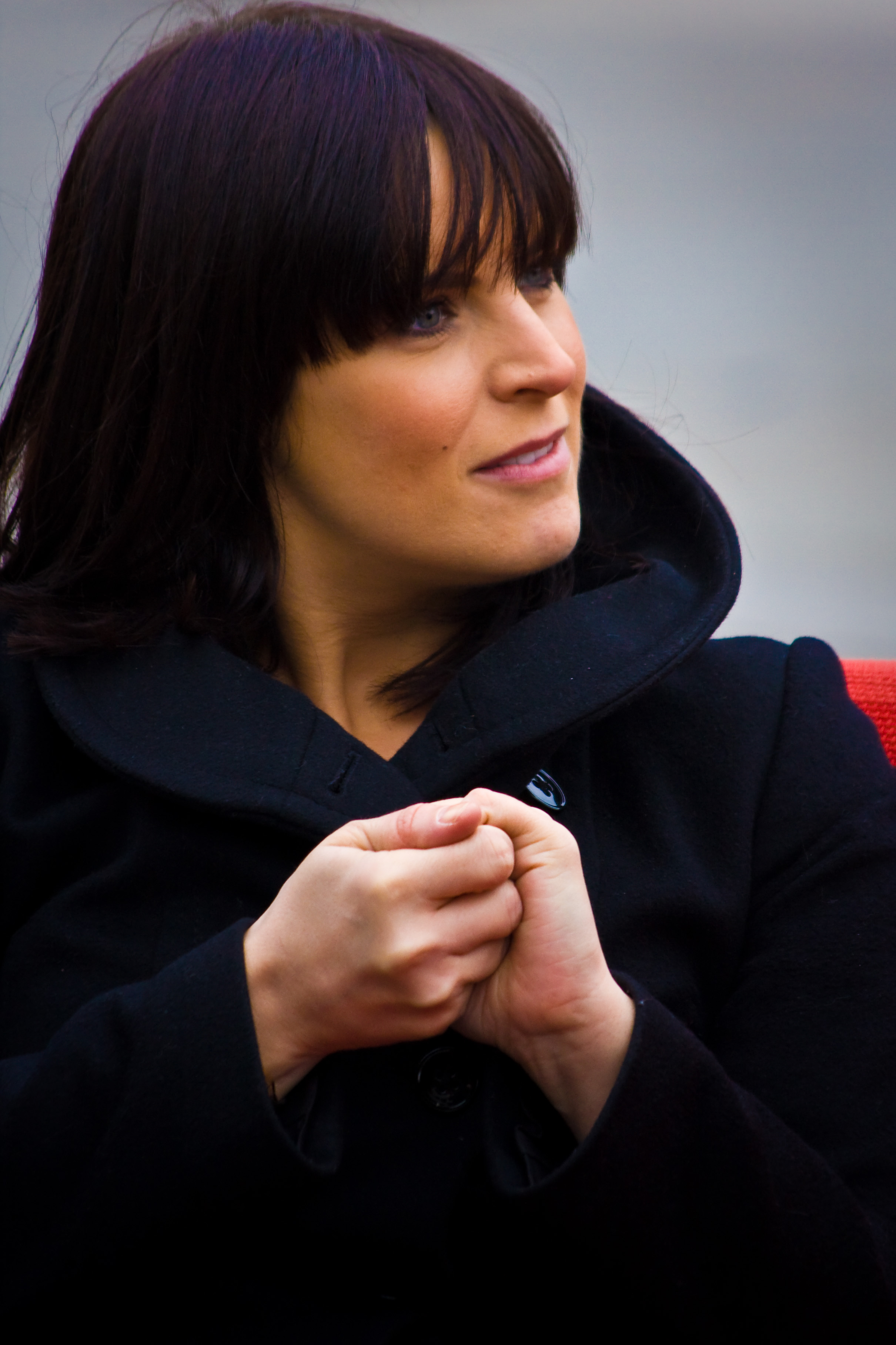
- Richardson doing an interview in Trafalgar Square, 2009
- Born: Anna Clare Richardson; 27 September 1970 (age 56); Wellington, Shropshire, England
- Occupations: Television presenter; writer; journalist
- Years active: 2000–present
- Employer: Channel 4
- Television: The Big Breakfast; Supersize vs Superskinny; The Sex Education Show; Secret Eaters; Naked Attraction
- Partner(s): Charles Martin (1996–2014); Sue Perkins (2014–2021)
- Website: annarichardson.co.uk

Anna Clare Richardson (born 27 September 1970) is an English television presenter, writer and journalist. She has presented various television shows for Channel 4, including Supersize vs Superskinny (2008–2009), The Sex Education Show (2008–2011), Secret Eaters (2012–2014), Supershoppers (2016–2019), Naked Attraction (2016–2024), and Changing Rooms (2021–2022).

== Early life ==
Richardson was born on 27 September 1970 in Wellington, Shropshire, England, daughter of James Richardson, vicar of Great Brington, Northamptonshire, and Janet, a religious education teacher. She was educated at The School of St Mary and St Anne, an Anglican girls' independent boarding school in the village of Abbots Bromley near Rugeley, Staffordshire.

== Career ==
Richardson started her television presenting career on The Big Breakfast on Channel 4, and thereafter for the next six years appeared regularly in television programmes including Love Bites for ITV, for which she was nominated for an RTS award.

Richardson went on to present Love Bites Back, Dream Ticket, Des Res, and the ITV series Big Screen, in which she interviewed a number of prominent Hollywood personalities.

Richardson has written and produced television programmes including No Waste Like Home, Turn Back Your Body Clock and Channel 4 series You Are What You Eat.

Richardson fronted Channel 4's The Sex Education Show, broadcast from 9 September to 14 October 2008. The Sex Education Show returned in March 2009 as The Sex Education Show vs. Pornography. A third series, The Sex Education Show: Am I Normal?, was broadcast in July 2010. The fourth series, called The Sex Education Show: Stop Pimping Our Kids, aired from 19 to 21 April 2011. The fifth series began on 19 July 2011.

Richardson presents Channel 4's Secret Eaters, which began on 16 May 2012. Alongside Louise Redknapp, she hosts How Not to Get Old, which began on 7 August 2013. Richardson and Andi Osho present Supershoppers, which began on Channel 4 on 1 February 2016.

Richardson presented Channel 4's Naked Attraction from 2016 until it ended in 2024. She described the series as "my favourite show ever".

In 2017, Richardson co-presented How to Retire at 40 on Channel 4. From January to June 2018, she was a panellist on six episodes of ITV's Loose Women. In February 2018, she co-presented How to Get Fit Fast with Amar Latif on Channel 4.

In 2019, Richardson presented Channel 4's Thomas Cook: The Rise and Fall of Britain’s Oldest Travel Agent, a documentary about the collapse of Thomas Cook Group.

Richardson presents Channel 4's How to Save a Grand in 24 Hours. The first episode aired on 26 April 2021.

On 5 May 2021, Channel 4 confirmed Richardson will be the host of the reboot of Changing Rooms.

On 26 May 2022, it was confirmed that Richardson would co-present with Yinka Bokinni the Channel 4 series Naked Education.

On 13 June 2023, Channel 4 commissioned the documentary The Truth About the 'Skinny' Jab about slimming jabs, which Richardson presented. It aired on 19 September 2023.

On 2 October 2024, Richardson presented Anna Richardson: Love, Loss & Dementia; a Channel 4 documentary about dementia in her own family.

On 7 December 2025, Richardson joined Magic Radio as a regular cover presenter.

== Legal dispute with Arnold Schwarzenegger ==
Richardson sued Arnold Schwarzenegger and two of his aides, Sean Walsh and publicist Sheryl Main, over comments they made about her claims that he groped her. The case was settled in 2006.

== Personal life ==
Richardson identifies her sexuality as fluid. In a 2015 interview with The Daily Telegraph, she stated:

"For me, it's just a case of 'I am who I am'. I'm not interested in being labelled gay or straight, my sexuality is fluid. I'm just me. I just happen to have fallen in love with a woman, simple as that."

Richardson was in an 18-year relationship with television director Charles Martin. She dated comedian Sue Perkins from 2014 before "amicably splitting" in 2021.

== Bibliography ==
- Body Blitz: Five Rules for a Brand New You (2010)
- Summer Body Blitz Diet: Five Rules for a Brand New You (2011)
- Mind Over Fatter: See Yourself Slim, Think Yourself Slim, Eat Yourself Slim (2015)
