= Frock Me =

- Genre: Fashion / Music / Teen
- Presented by: Alexa Chung; Henry Holland; Gemma Cairney
- Country of origin: United Kingdom
- Original language: English
- No. of seasons: 2
- No. of episodes: 13

Production
- Executive producers: Sean Murphy; Jules Wilson; Kate Brown
- Production location: UK / US
- Camera setup: Season 1: multi-camera studio Season 2: single-camera location
- Running time: 30 minutes

Original release
- Network: T4 (Channel 4) UK; Lifestyle You Australia
- Release: 5 October – 16 November 2008

Frock Me is a British fashion and music television series hosted by fashion icon Alexa Chung, designer Henry Holland and style scout Gemma Cairney. The show has a fast-paced magazine format exploring the relationship between and influences of music and fashion on each other; featuring big-name designers, celebrity guests and bands. It was first broadcast within Channel 4's teen zone T4 from October 2008 as a seven-part studio series. A second location-based series of six episodes aired on T4 and late-night Channel 4 in April/May 2010.

Each episode of the show was themed around a current youth and fashion trend, and explored the music and fashion connections and influences behind each trend. The guests, features and bands in each show related to this theme.

The funding for the second series of the show was provided by UK clothing retailer TK Maxx.

== List of Episodes ==
=== Series One Themes (Autumn/Winter 2008) ===
1. Rock & Roll Jeans
2. Logos Slogans and Labels
3. Club Chic
4. Gothic Horror
5. Vintage
6. Sportswear
7. Anti-Fashion

=== Series Two Themes (Spring/Summer 2010) ===
1. Military
2. Underwear as Outerwear
3. Prints
4. Americana
5. Romance
6. Festival Fashion
