= Katie Thistleton =

English television and radio presenter

- Born: Manchester, UK
- Education: University of Salford; National Council for the Training of Journalists (NCTJ)
- Occupations: Television presenter radio presenter journalist author
- Years active: 2004–present
- Known for: CBBC; BBC Radio 1

Katie Lorna Thistleton is an English television and radio presenter, journalist and author, best known for her work across BBC Radio 1 and previously CBBC. She currently co-hosts Radio 1's Going Home show alongside Vick Hope and Jamie Laing, having previously been host of Life Hacks and The Official Chart: First Look.

== Early life ==
Born in Manchester, Thistleton attended Droylsden High School for Girls. Thistleton graduated from the University of Salford with a degree in English and Creative Writing along with fellow presenter Lauren Layfield, before qualifying as a NCTJ certified journalist after studying at News Associates, Manchester.

Thistleton previously worked for the NHS Pennine Care mental health trust.

== Career ==
=== Television ===
Thistleton is best known for her work presenting in CBBC HQ (previously the CBBC Office), hosting the live 'bits in between the shows'. She has done this since she was headhunted for the job in 2013 whilst working behind the scenes for CBBC as a PA and Researcher.

She hosted the CBBC Book Club on the CBBC channel. The Book Club role has seen Thistleton interviewing many leading authors, including David Baddiel, Cressida Cowell, Jeff Kinney, Michael Rosen, Holly Smale, and Jacqueline Wilson.

Thistleton has also appeared on a variety of CBBC shows, including All Over the Place, Blue Peter, Jedward's Big Adventure, The Dog Ate My Homework, and Sam & Mark's Big Friday Wind-Up. In March 2019, Katie Thistleton announced she would be leaving CBBC to focus on new projects. Her last day was on 29 March.

Away from children's television, Thistleton has also appeared on Celebrity Eggheads, Celebrity Mastermind, and Children in Need. In December 2024, she came third in a celebrity edition of PopMaster TV, behind fellow BBC radio presenters OJ Borg and Bob Harris.

=== Literary roles ===
In addition to her televised literary work, Thistleton has hosted author events organised by publishing houses, including Hachette, HarperCollins, and Penguin.

Thistleton has been a regular at literary festivals, including the Edinburgh Literary Festival and Hay Festival. She has also judged The Blue Peter Book Awards and The Royal Society Young People's Book Prize.

=== Mental-health ambassador and counsellor ===
Thistleton has worked to raise mental health awareness. She has been an ambassador for the mental health charities Young Minds and Place2Be.

=== Radio ===
From May to December 2017, Thistleton hosted BBC Radio 1's The Surgery alongside Radha Modgil.

Thistleton hosted Life Hacks and The Official Chart: First Look on Radio 1 alongside Vick Hope from 2017 to 2024, as well as her show on Friday and Saturday mornings from 2022 to 2024.

Thistleton regularly co-hosted Going Home with Vick and Jordan on BBC Radio 1 when either Hope or Jordan North was absent. When North left the station, she joined the show permanently alongside Hope and Jamie Laing, with the show being renamed to Going Home with Vick, Katie and Jamie.

She has also anchored Radio 1's live coverage of Radio 1's Big Weekend, Glastonbury, Boardmasters and Leeds and Reading Festival.

=== Book ===
Thistleton's debut book – Dear Katie: Real Problems, Real Advice – was published by the Orion Publishing Group in February 2018.

== Personal life ==
On 30 October 2024, Thistleton announced live on Radio One that she was expecting a baby with her husband Alex. Their son, Reuben Alexander was born on 6 March 2025.
