= Just Seventeen =

UK magazine for teenage girls

- Cover of 24 July 1991 edition featuring Madonna
- Categories: Teen magazine
- Frequency: Fortnightly; Monthly
- First issue: 20 October 1983
- Final issue: April 2004
- Company: EMAP
- Country: United Kingdom
- Based in: London
- Language: English

Just Seventeen, often referred to as J-17, was a fortnightly magazine aimed at teenage girls, published by Emap from October 1983 to April 2004. A special preview edition was given away free with sister magazine Smash Hits on 13 October 1983, with the first issue published the following week, on 20 October 1983 (thereby alternating weeks with Smash Hits).

Just Seventeen had become a weekly publication by early 1986. It quickly became the UK's market-leading teen-girl magazine until the launch of Sugar in 1994. Sales of J-17 began to decline and in 1997, the magazine was changed to a monthly format in response to the declining circulation, and the magazine was finally closed in 2004, after losing a third of its readership.
