= Teenage Magazine Arbitration Panel =

British magazine industry self-regulatory body

The Teenage Magazine Arbitration Panel is a British magazine industry self-regulatory body that creates guidelines related to magazines where more than 25 per cent of the readership are aged under 16. The panel's guidelines state "readers will always be encouraged to take a responsible attitude to sex".

From its inception in 1996 through 2009, the panel has ruled on only three complaints. Author Sue Palmer has called TMAP a "toothless watchdog."
