= The Argentina Independent =

Argentine Newspaper

The Argentina Independent was an English-language newspaper, and news website published in Buenos Aires, Argentina. The paper was founded by Kristie Robinson and Lucy Cousins in 2006; it began publishing fortnightly as The Argentimes before changing its name to The Argentina Independent in 2010.

On January 4, 2017, editors Kristie Robinson and Marc Rogers announced that The Independent would discontinue because it was not financially sustainable in an article titled A Farewell Message from The Indy Editors.
