= Vanity Lair =

- Presented by: Alexa Chung

Production
- Producers: Janie Valentine; Christopher Potts; Megan Ellis
- Production company: Tiger Aspect Productions

Original release
- Network: Channel 4
- Release: 3 February – 6 April 2008

Vanity Lair is a reality television programme on Channel 4 in the United Kingdom. The series began on 3 February 2008 and is presented by Alexa Chung.

The shows aim is to discover what being beautiful really is. The format involves ten pre-selected "beautiful people" living in a mansion called 'Vanity Lair'. Each week three new arrivals compete for a place in the lair. The three new arrivals are immediately faced with the ten lairmates and asked a series of questions, the lairmates then decide which of the three to eliminate. The remaining two new arrivals then spend the rest of the week living in the mansion. At the end of the week the lairmates then vote on who they believe to be the most attractive of the new arrivals, the person scoring lowest is sent home. The new arrival scoring highest wins a place in 'Vanity Lair', however they then have to decide which of the current lairmates to eliminate, as there is only room for ten lairmates at any one time. In addition to this all contestants face a series of 'experiments throughout their stay in the lair.

The first series finished with an extended season finale on 6 April 2008, with a double episode.

== Lairmates ==
In the order they sit in the judgement room:

Week 1	Week 2	Week 3	Week 4	Week 5	Week 6	Week 7	Week 8	Week 9	Week 10
Kasey	Kasey	Kasey	Kasey	Kasey	Kasey	Kasey	Kasey	Kasey	Kasey
Nick	Nick	Nick	Kristina	Kristina	Kristina	Kristina	Kristina	Kristina	Kristina
Shani	Shani	Shani	Shani	Jonny	Jonny	Jonny	Jonny	Jonny	Jonny
Scott	Scott	Scott	Scott	Scott	Scott	Scott	Iain	Nicole	Emma
Stephanie	Thomas	Thomas	Thomas	Thomas	Thomas	Thomas	Thomas	Thomas	Thomas
Pavle	Pavle	Pavle	Pavle	Pavle	Pavle	Pavle	Pavle	Pavle	Pavle
Vanessa	Vanessa	Vanessa	Vanessa	Vanessa	Vanessa	Vanessa	Vanessa	Vanessa	Vanessa
Andrew	Andrew	Andrew	Andrew	Andrew	Lizzie	Candice	Candice	Candice	Candice
Larissa	Larissa	Larissa	Larissa	Larissa	Larissa	Larissa	Larissa	Larissa	Larissa
Tony	Tony	Emmett	Emmett	Emmett	Emmett	Emmett	Emmett	Emmett	Emmett
Thomas	Emmett	Kristina	Jonny	Lizzie	Candice	Iain	Nicole	Emma	
Kellie	Helen	Ellie	Solomon	Beatrix	Luke	Martin	Bianca	Alex	
Kaveh	Annameka	Katherine	Ollie	Hannah	James	Ashley	Laura	Hare	
						James		Clare	

The lairmate who was replaced by the new arrival
The new arrival chosen to join the lair
The new arrival voted the least attractive and eliminated at final judging
The new arrival eliminated on first impressions
The new arrival quit the competition
The winner of Vanity Lair
