= Injection lipolysis =

Controversial cosmetic procedure

Injection lipolysis is a controversial cosmetic procedure in which drug mixtures are injected into patients with the goal of destroying fat cells. This practice, using drugs generally based on phosphatidylcholine and deoxycholate (PCDC), evolved from the initial intravenous use of those drug formulations to treat blood disorders.

While no placebo-controlled studies have demonstrated the safety or efficacy of this therapy, numerous retrospective studies of Lipostabil injections have reported the efficacy of this practice. The mixture is injected directly into the subcutaneous fat through multiple microinjections administered over multiple treatment sessions. The desired result is the removal of localized fat deposits.

== History ==
In 1966, investigators noted that the intravenous infusion of PC-containing solutions could remove fat emboli. Later, a drug formulation called Lipostabil containing 5% PC and 2.5% deoxycholate (DC) was approved in Germany and used in the treatment of fat embolism, dyslipidemia, and alcohol-induced liver cirrhosis. The first report of Lipostabil injection for fat removal demonstrated that infra-orbital ("under the eyelid") fat could be removed by Lipostabil injection.

=== Kybella ===
In 2015, the US Food and Drug Administration approved deoxycholic acid (branded as Kybella) for use as an injection lipolysis product when used to reduce moderate to severe submental fullness (double chin). While the procedure is generally considered safe when performed by a qualified healthcare professional, potential side effects may include swelling, bruising, numbness, and rarely, nerve injury in the treated area.

== Health warnings ==
Three medical associations have issued health warnings cautioning against the use of injection lypolysis, including the American Society of Plastic Surgeons (ASPS), the American Society for Aesthetic Plastic Surgery (ASAPS), and the American Society of Dermatologic Surgery (ASDS).The Aesthetic Surgery Education and Research Foundation has funded on behalf of the American Society for Aesthetic Plastic Surgery a half side comparison study with interesting results

== Restrictive action taken by FDA against Lipodissolve ==
On April 7, 2010, the US Food and Drug Administration issued Warning Letters to six U.S. based medspas and a company in Brazil for making false or misleading statements on their Web sites about drugs they claimed will eliminate fat in a procedure called "lipodissolve", or for otherwise misbranding lipodissolve products. "We are concerned that these companies are misleading consumers", said Janet Woodcock, M.D., director of the FDA's Center for Drug Evaluation and Research. "It is important for anyone who is considering this voluntary procedure to understand that the products used to perform lipodissolve procedures are not approved by the FDA for fat removal".

For the complete FDA statement, see here . To see the warning letter, see .

The FDA received reports of adverse effects in persons who had the procedure using these drugs, including permanent scarring, skin deformation, and deep painful knots under the skin in areas where the lipodissolve products have been injected. The warning letters were issued to the following U.S. companies: Monarch Medspa, King of Prussia, Pa; Spa 35, Boise, Idaho; Medical Cosmetic Enhancements, Chevy Chase, Md.; Innovative Directions in Health, Edina, Minn PURE Med Spa, Boca Raton, Fl.; and All About You Med Spa, Madison, Ind. The Brazilian company receiving a warning letter markets lipodissolve products on two Web sites: zipmed.net and mesoone.com.

The FDA is requesting a written response from the U.S. companies within 15 business days of receipt of the warning letters stating how they will correct these violations and prevent similar violations in the future. Each U.S. company has been informed in its warning letter that failure to promptly correct the violations may result in legal action. Each of the companies involved has been cited for a variety of regulatory violations, including making unsupported claims that the products have an outstanding safety record and are superior to other fat loss procedures, including liposuction. Additionally some of the letters indicate that the companies have made claim that lipodissolve products can be used to treat certain medical conditions, such as male breast enlargement, benign fatty growths known as lipomas, excess fat deposits and surgical deformities. The FDA is not aware of clinical evidence to support any of these claims.

== International regulation ==
The Medicines and Healthcare products Regulatory Agency, the governmental body regulating the manufacture and commercialization of drugs in the United Kingdom, issued a similar warning to physicians considering the use of these substances for cosmetic purposes, stating these drugs "are being unlawfully advertised in the UK as a cosmetic product for the reduction of fat." The MHRA also pointed out that considerable safety concerns remain because these agents have not been tested in controlled clinical trials. While British physicians can still inject Lipodissolve for fat removal, the drug cannot be promoted as a drug for that purpose. As of July, 2005, The Medical Protection Society, the organization that provides British doctors with legal advice and coverage against litigation costs and damages, ceased offering malpractice insurance for use of Lipodissolve because of safety concerns.
On the other hand, the therapy is very often administered especially in German-speaking countries because the drug Lipostabil N has been approved in Germany for more than 40 years. A physicians' network, the NETWORK-Lipolysis with 3,000 members worldwide amongst them 1,000 alone in German-speaking countries has collected safety data. The latest published so-called Lipolysis Report 2015 has been published in 2016. 4% of the members have answered the survey. 29,889 patient results have been collected with in total ca. 76,000 treatment sessions. Nowadays the composition is compounded by pharmacies in Germany and Switzerland.
