= Naked Attraction =

British dating TV series (2016–2024)

- Genre: Dating game show
- Presented by: Anna Richardson
- Country of origin: United Kingdom
- Original language: English
- No. of series: 12
- No. of episodes: 73 (including compilations)

Production
- Production locations: The London Studios (2016) dock10 studios (2017–2024)
- Running time: 60 minutes (incl. adverts)
- Production company: Studio Lambert

Original release
- Network: Channel 4
- Release: 25 July 2016 – 27 March 2024

Naked Attraction is a British television dating game show produced by Studio Lambert and broadcast on Channel 4. Hosted by Anna Richardson, the show ran from 25 July 2016 until 27 March 2024, airing for seven series. The series' premise involved a clothed single person presented with a gallery of six nude potential partners, who were hidden behind differently coloured booths that concurrently revealed themselves from the bottom up.

Two special series entitled Best Naughty Bits aired from 18 May to 15 June 2021, and from 6-20 April 2022, whilst a special entitled All Out & Proud aired on 23 June 2022. During its run, Naked Attraction was the subject of numerous complaints to Ofcom for its full-frontal nudity, but Ofcom declined to perform an investigation due to the lack of sexual activity and the series' late night timeslot.

Richardson confirmed in March 2025 that there were no plans for any future series of Naked Attraction.

== Premise ==
A clothed person is faced with six naked people who are initially hidden in booths. Their bodies and faces are gradually revealed through successive rounds, from the feet up. At each round, the chooser eliminates one naked person until only two are left, when the chooser also takes off their clothes to make the final choice. The chooser then decides which person they wish to go out with, and the two (or, occasionally, three) then go for a fully clothed date.

== Production ==
One contestant reported that each episode could take up to twelve hours to film, although the contestant choosing a date only had to disrobe for fifteen minutes. The resultant date took place at 9 a.m. the next day. The picker had to have someone with them at all times to make sure they did not accidentally bump into one of the contestants, and if one of the contestants needed a toilet break, they had to be escorted out by a member of staff so the picker did not see them leave their coloured booth.

Contestants did not receive payment for participating, but standby contestants were given £75 for being in the room.

== Controversy ==
Upon its initial release, numerous complaints about the programme were made by viewers to the broadcasting watchdog Ofcom due to the full-frontal nudity that is featured in the program. Ofcom chose not to investigate as there was nothing that breached its rules: the show was purely a dating show and did not contain any sexual activity, and was shown after the watershed.

Naked Attraction was made available to stream in the United States on HBO Max in September 2023. The Parents Television and Media Council deemed the show as “pornographic... a new low”, and demanded that it be removed from the service. Naked Attraction was removed from HBO Max on September 21, 2026, understood to be due to expiration of the broadcast rights.

== Transmissions ==
=== Series ===
Series	Start date	End date	Episodes
1	25 July 2016	22 August 2016	5
2	29 June 2017	8 September 2017	10
3	24 August 2018	14 September 2018	4
4	25 October 2018	29 November 2018	6
5	21 August 2019	18 September 2019	5
6	9 January 2020	6 February 2020	5
7	10 November 2020	8 December 2020	5
8	13 April 2021	11 May 2021	5
9	2 March 2022	23 March 2022	5
10	1 September 2022	29 September 2022	4
11	19 April 2023	24 May 2023	6
12	13 February 2024	20 March 2024	4

=== Compilations ===
Series	Start date	End date	Episode(s)
Best Naughty Bits #1	18 May 2021	15 June 2021	5
Best Naughty Bits #2	6 April 2022	20 April 2022	3
All Out & Proud	23 June 2022	N/A	1

== European adaptations ==
The following is a list of European adaptations of Naked Attraction, with most shows broadcasting the same, or a very similar format. The Dutch adaptation, Undress for love, has the most significant changes to its format, notably broadcasting in front of a live studio audience. In September 2021, it was revealed there were plans for a Russian adaption, but it never reached production.

Country	Name	Channel	Series	Episodes	Premiere	Most recent episode	Presenter
Germany	Naked Attraction – Dating hautnah	RTL II (2017–2020); Discovery+, TLC (2023)	4	32	8 May 2017	5 October 2023	Milka Loff Fernandes (2017–2020); Julian F. M. Stoeckel (2023)
Netherlands	Undress for Love	RTL XL	1	6	5 November 2018	10 December 2018	Lieke van Lexmond
Denmark	Date mig nøgen	TV 2	3	18	10 February 2019	23 November 2020	Ibi Makienok
Finland	Naked Attraction Suomi	Dplay+	4	32	4 December 2020	15 September 2024	Marja Kihlström
Italy	Naked Attraction Italia	Discovery+, NOVE, Real Time	3	34	7 February 2021	9 August 2024	Nina Palmieri
Norway	Naked Attraction Norge	Discovery+, TVNorge	4	22	22 April 2021	13 June 2024	Tuva Fellman
Poland	Magia nagości. Polska	Player.pl, Zoom TV	4	25	3 September 2021	4 April 2025	Beata Olga Kowalska (2021–2022); Julia Oleś (2025)
Sweden	Naked Attraction Sverige	Discovery+, Kanal 5	2	12	7 June 2022	17 September 2024	Sofia Wistam
Spain	Naked Attraction	Max, DKiss	1	7	15 April 2024	21 May 2024	Marta Flich
Czech Republic and Slovakia	Naked Attraction Česko & Slovensko	Prima+, Óčko	2	25	6 October 2025	(broadcasting)	Monika Timková
Belgium ( Flanders)	Naked Attraction Vlaanderen	Streamz	1	5	14 September 2026	18 September 2026	Jolien Roets

Adaptation that is currently broadcasting

== Legacy ==
The 2026 video game Grand Theft Auto VI includes a parody of Naked Attraction on its in-game TV network called Whose Dick's Whose, with an identical set to that of Naked Attraction's colored pods.

== See also ==
- Adam Zkt. Eva
- Buying Naked
- Dating Naked
- Naked and Afraid
- Naked News
