= Alexa Chung =

English television presenter (born 1983)

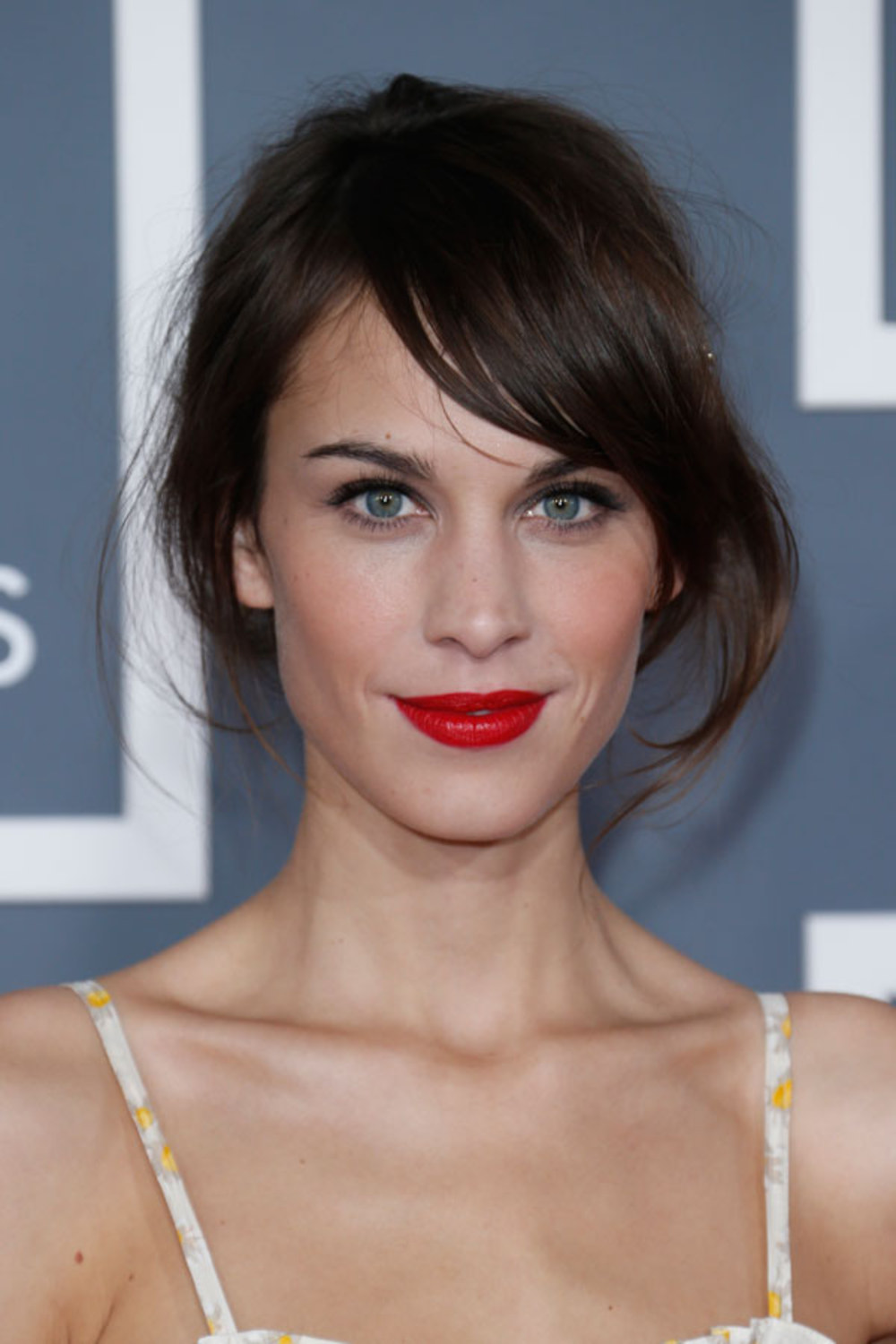
- Chung in 2013
- Born: 5 November 1983 (age 42); Winchester, England
- Education: Peter Symonds College
- Occupations: Model; television presenter
- Years active: 1999–present
- Height: 1.73 m (5 ft 8 in)
- Partner(s): David Titlow (2003–2006); Alex Turner (2007–2011); Tom Sturridge (2022–present)

Alexa Chung (born 5 November 1983) is an English model and television personality. Chung pursued a modelling career as a teenager after being scouted by a modeling agency at the Reading Festival. She has walked for brands such as Vivienne Westwood, Stella McCartney and Miu Miu, as well as being the face of Pepe Jeans, Lacoste, DKNY Jeans, Tommy Hilfiger and Longchamp.

In 2006, Chung became co‑host of Channel 4's music show Popworld, known for its irreverent and awkward style of interviews. In 2007, she became a long-time host of Channel 4's early morning music programme Freshly Squeezed. That same year, Chung left England to pursue a career in the US, where she presented It's On with Alexa Chung for MTV. The show was cancelled in December 2009. She returned to the UK in 2010 and began hosting MTV Rocks' Gonzo with Alexa Chung, a British chat show previously hosted by Zane Lowe. In 2020, Chung joined Queer Eye's Tan France as co-host of the Netflix original fashion competition show Next in Fashion; the show was cancelled after one season and later revived with model Gigi Hadid replacing Chung.

Chung has been recognised for her fashion style. She has been described as "the 21st-century it girl" and as "a proto-influencer". In January 2010, Mulberry debuted the "Alexa", a bag named after and inspired by her. Chung has won three British Style Awards at the Fashion Awards which are organised by the British Fashion Council. In 2013 she wrote the book It, a collection of personal writings, drawings and photographs. Her fashion label Alexa Chung, stylized alexachung, launched in May 2017 and closed in 2022.

== Early life ==
Chung was born in Winchester, Hampshire, England, the youngest of four children, and was raised in nearby Privett. She is the daughter of Gillian and Phillip Chung. Her father, a graphic designer, is Chinese and has Chinese ancestry, while her mother, a housewife, is English. Growing up she had horse riding and ballet lessons.

Chung has cited the BBC One's programme The Clothes Show as getting her interested in fashion as a child. Chung attended secondary state school at the local Perins School and studied her A-Levels at Peter Symonds College, Winchester. She was accepted at King's College London to study English and Chelsea College of Arts to study art, but at the age of 16 was scouted by a modelling agency at the Reading Festival before attending.

== Career ==
=== Modelling ===
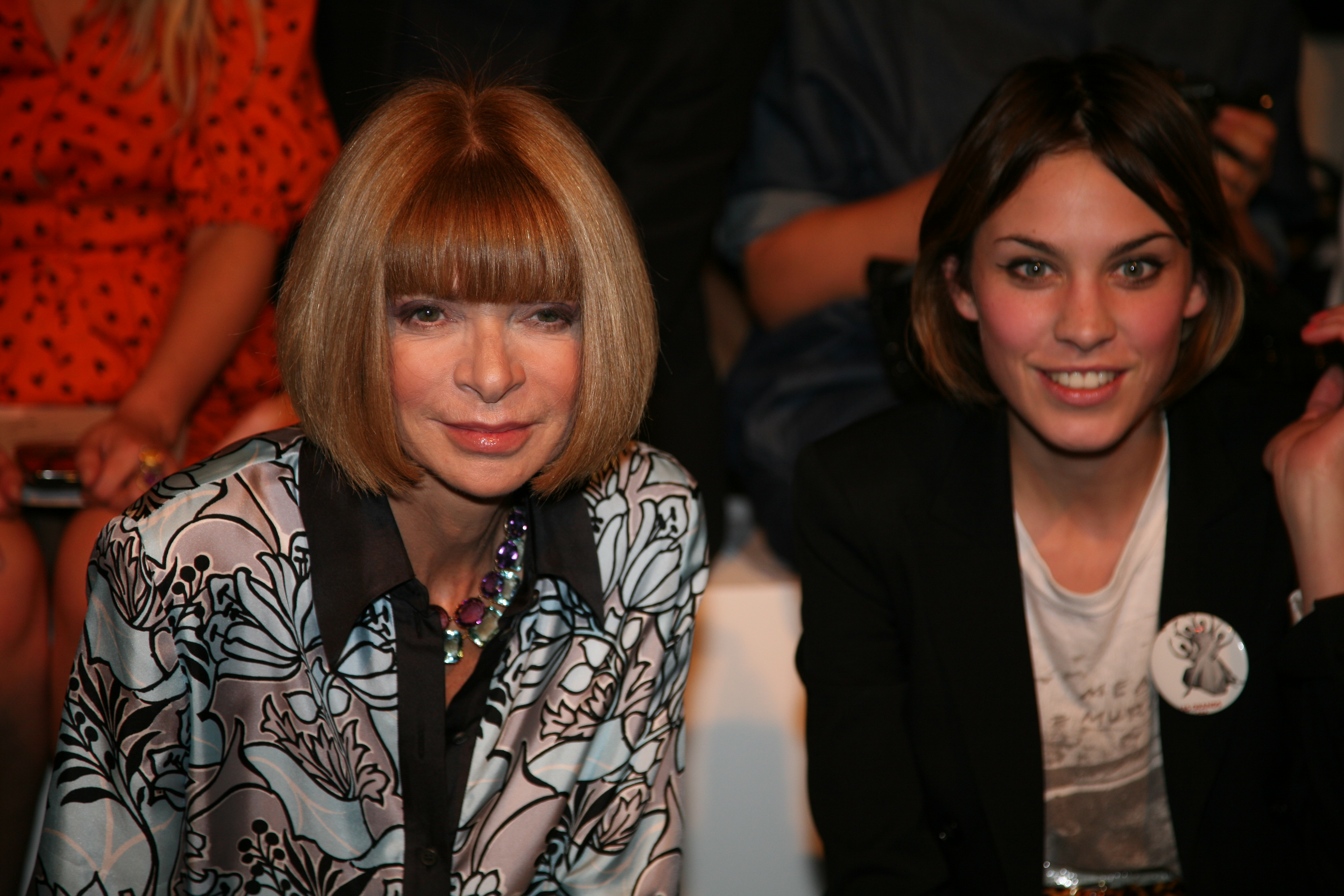
Anna Wintour (left) and Chung in 2009

Chung was scouted after being seen in the comedy tent at the Reading Festival at the age of 16. She modelled for teen magazines, such as Elle Girl and CosmoGIRL!, and worked for companies including Fanta, Sony Ericsson, Sunsilk, Urban Outfitters, and Tampax. She appeared in music videos for artists including The Streets, Westlife, Delta Goodrem, Reuben and Holly Valance and starred as Jake in a scripted reality show called Shoot Me, broadcast on Fashion TV in 2005. After four years, Chung quit modeling with the intention of studying an art foundation or fashion journalism course, having become disillusioned with her career. She had developed a "distorted body image" and "low self-esteem" through modelling.

After she became a TV personality, Chung made a return to occasional modelling. In 2008, she was the face of Australian fashion label Antipodium's SS 2008 collection and Oxfam's ethical fashion range, Revamped. In September 2008, Chung walked the catwalk as part of the Vivienne Westwood Red Label Spring/Summer 2009 show at London Fashion Week. In early 2009, she became the face of British High Street giant New Look. Chung then joined London-based modelling agency Select Model Management and, in April 2009, she modeled Wren's Holiday 2009 collection, alongside her friend Tennessee Thomas. In July 2009, Chung moved to NEXT Model Management and became the face of DKNY Jeans. Chung was the face of South Korean brand MOGG's Spring/Summer 2010 campaign. In January 2010, she became the main model of the Spring/Summer 2010 Pepe Jeans London campaign and reprised her role for the Fall/Winter 2010 campaign. She was announced as the first celebrity face of Lacoste in June 2010, appearing in both the TV and print advertising campaigns for their "Joy of Pink" fragrance. In January 2011, Chung was announced as the face of Italian sneaker brand Superga, in a campaign to mark their 100th anniversary. In February 2012, she took part in the London Fashion Week show for designer Stella McCartney, where she acted as a guest assistant to magician Hans Klok in a number of illusions including being levitated and sawed in half.

Chung worked with Tommy Hilfiger as a guest editor for their Fall 2014 collection, and modeled their clothes. Chung became the face of Longchamp in 2013 and by 2015 she had appeared in her fourth campaign for the fashion brand.

=== Style ===
Chung has been cited as a muse to many fashion designers because of her distinctive personal style. She frequently appears on best-dressed lists, is a regular model for Vogue, Elle and Harper's Bazaar, and is often seen in the front row at fashion shows.

In January 2010, the designer handbag company Mulberry debuted the "Alexa", a popular bag named after and inspired by her. According to The Guardian, 380 "Alexa" bags were sold in one week alone in November 2010, and the company cited the bag's popularity for increased sales at its UK and international stores that year.

In February 2010, Chung collaborated with J.Crew's Madewell on a womenswear line which was unveiled during New York Fashion Week. She collaborated with Madewell for a second collection, released in September 2011.

In December 2010, Bryan Ferry, on behalf of the British Fashion Council, presented Chung with the British Style Award which "recognises an individual who embodies the spirit of British fashion and is an international ambassador for the UK as a leading creative hub for fashion" at a ceremony at the Savoy Theatre in London. At the British Fashion Awards of 2011, 2012 and 2013, Chung won the British Style Award, for which the public voted. In 2015, Chung collaborated with AG Jeans on two collections.

=== Alexachung ===
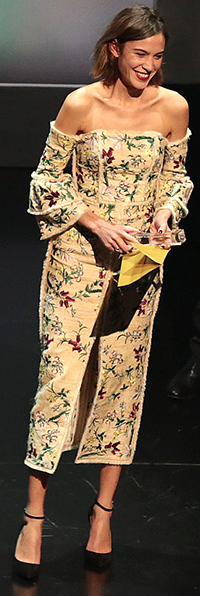
Chung presenting an award at the 2015 British Fashion Awards

Chung launched her own fashion label, Alexachung, in May 2017.

In March 2022 Chung announced the closure of the Alexachung brand, stating that "the last couple of years have been challenging for small independent businesses and ours is no exception."

=== TV presenting ===
In April 2006, the then-model Chung was offered the job of co‑host on Popworld on Channel 4, a music show known for its irreverent and awkward style of interviews. Chung and co‑host Alex Zane also presented a weekly radio show called Popworld Radio. Chung then moved to Channel 4, where she guest presented Big Brother's Big Mouth and appeared as a panellist on quiz show 8 out of 10 Cats. She hosted a number of T4 Movie Specials, 4Music Specials, T4 Holiday Mornings along with T4's coverage of many music festivals.

In January 2008, Chung became one of the four anchor T4 presenters. She hosted T4's Vanity Lair, a reality show investigating the concept of "beauty". When the show was mentioned in a later interview, "Chung raise[d] her eyebrows, indicating embarrassment". As well as her work on T4, she became a long-time host of Channel 4's early morning music programme Freshly Squeezed beginning in September 2007. In addition to her Channel 4 commitments, Chung presented the ITV1 series Get a Grip (2007) and BBC Three's The Wall (2008). In mid-2008, Chung began to host more fashion-oriented programming. She was the "roving reporter" on Channel 4's "Gok's Fashion Fix". On the programme, Chung roadtested the latest fashion trends with members of the public, and interviewed fashion designers such as Roberto Cavalli, Karl Lagerfeld, Jean Paul Gaultier, Margherita Missoni and Christian Lacroix. She described it as "pretty much my dream job". Chung also hosted a T4 fashion and music show called Frock Me, with fashion designer Henry Holland. She hosted the Diesel U Music Awards and the Elle Style Awards. In 2009, Chung was awarded both the Elle Style award for Best TV Presenter and Glamour's award for Best TV Presenter.

Chung left Channel 4 and the United Kingdom in April 2009 to pursue a career in the US. She presented It's On with Alexa Chung for MTV. The live, daily show—billed as Total Request Live's replacement—featured celebrity talk, live music and online interaction with viewers. The show was cancelled in December 2009. She returned to UK TV screens in April 2010 with a second series of Frock Me. In October 2010, she began hosting Gonzo with Alexa Chung, an informal British chat show previously hosted by Zane Lowe, for MTV Rocks. In January 2011, she co‑hosted NBC's "2011 Golden Globe Arrivals Special" with Carson Daly and Natalie Morales. The live show featured interviews with television and film stars as well as segments devoted to fashion on the red carpet. Chung presented the iTunes Festival in July 2011. Chung has since worked on 24 Hour Catwalk, acting as the host and a judge. In 2012, Chung soon became the founding co-host for the nightly music show Fuse News. In December 2013, it was announced that Chung would be leaving Fuse News to focus on other endeavours. In September 2015, Chung hosted an online documentary series for Vogue UK.

She launched her own YouTube channel in May 2019; in a statement, she said: "It's an incredibly exciting prospect as I can't wait to share unfiltered original content through a host of videos spanning fashion, art, travel and other random things."

Chung joined Queer Eye's Tan France as co-host of the Netflix original fashion competition show Next in Fashion, which debuted on 29 January 2020. In June 2020, Netflix announced it was cancelling the show after one season.

=== Writing and other ventures ===
Chung wrote a monthly column for British women's magazine Company from October 2007 to June 2008. She then wrote a weekly newspaper column for Britain's The Independent from November 2008 to June 2009, titled "Girl About Town" and later "New York Doll". In June 2009, she was made a contributing editor of British Vogue. She has interviewed designers such as Karl Lagerfeld and Christopher Kane for the publication, and wrote a cover story about Kate Upton. Chung's first book, It, was released on 5 September 2013.

From 2009 to 2010 Chung was a member of the indie band The Stray with her close friend, model Misty Fox. She was credited as playing keyboards.

== Personal life ==
Chung lived with fashion photographer David Titlow, 20 years her senior, for three and a half years from 2003 to 2006. She was in a four-year relationship with Arctic Monkeys frontman Alex Turner from July 2007 until July 2011; they lived together in London and later in New York where Chung purchased an apartment in the East Village. In a 2013 interview, Chung stated that Turner remained her "best friend". The former couple were seen together on a number of occasions in 2014. She dated actor Alexander Skarsgård from 2015 to early 2017. In 2016, she returned to London to launch a clothing label.

In an Instagram post on 28 July 2020, Chung revealed her endometriosis diagnosis and urged more awareness on the disorder.

In May 2024, it was reported that Chung was engaged to actor Tom Sturridge.

== Published works ==
- It. Penguin Books. 2014. ISBN 978-0-14-312676-8.
