= Sneak magazine =

British magazine

Sneak magazine was a British weekly magazine for young women. It focused on celebrity gossip, real-life stories and high street fashion and beauty. The magazine was owned by Emap, one of the biggest publishers of magazines in the UK.

It ran from April 2002 with the last edition being published in August 2006.
