= Radha Modgil =

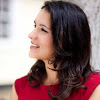
- Radha Modgil
- Born: Radha Modgil; 18 August 1979 (age 47)
- Occupations: GP, Radio Presenter, TV Personality

Radha Modgil is an English medical doctor and media personality.

== Biography ==
Modgil studied at University of Cambridge gaining an MA degree and qualified as a doctor at Imperial College London. She worked for five years in hospital medicine in London and then trained for a further two years to qualify as a general practitioner. Modgil continues to practice as an NHS GP, as well as teaching and working in health promotion.

Modgil was one of the co-hosts of BBC Radio 1's The Surgery prior to its cancellation in 2017; her final co-host was Katie Thistleton. She was the resident GP for Live with Gabby on Channel 5 and also for Newsround (CBBC). She appeared as the medical reporter & presenter for Channel 4's The Sex Education Show (series 1–5) and BBC Three's Make My Body Younger (series 1–2).

== Filmography ==
=== Television ===
- City Hospital, BBC One (2004)
- Make My Body Younger, BBC Three Series 1, (2008)
- Make My Body Younger, BBC Three Series 2, (2009)
- ITV News at Ten (2010)
- The Sex Education Show, Channel 4
  - Series 1 (2008)
  - Series 2: "The Sex Education Show vs Pornography" (2009)
  - Series 3: "Am I Normal?" (2010)
  - Series 4: "Stop Pimping Our Kids" (2011)
  - Series 5: "Britain's Sex Survey" (2012)
- The Vanessa Show, Channel Five, (2011)
- Live with Gaby, Channel Five, (2011–2012)
- Dying for Clear Skin, BBC Three, (2012)
- Chasing the Saturdays, E!, (2013)
- BBC Breakfast, Online Safety/Bullying, BBC One (2013)
- This Morning, Health Alert- Women's Health, ITV, (2013)
- Channel 5 News - Older People & The NHS (2014)
- ITV Tonight - Fuel Poverty & Health (2014)
- Newsround - Resident GP and Expert for Food Week & Diabetes Special, CBBC, (2015)
- Feeling Better, CBeebies (2018)

=== Radio ===
- The Surgery with Katie and Dr Radha, Co-presenter, BBC Radio One
- Interviews and medical broadcasting, LBC 2013
- Interviews and Q & A, BBC Oxford 2012
- Radio Europe 2012

=== Podcast ===
- The Richard Nicholls Podcast (2020)
- Blank Podcast (2020)
