= Geoffrey Goodwin =

Geoffrey Goodwin is a television and digital executive who has worked in both the United Kingdom and in his native Canada. He was head of strategy for drama, entertainment, comedy, children’s and film at the BBC from 2003 to 2007, and wrote the BBC's under-18s strategy with Andy Parfitt in 2007. In that year, 2007 Goodwin set up BBC Switch, a multi-platform brand aimed at teenagers, which he ran for four years. In January 2013, after working for the then CEO of BBC Worldwide John Smith, Goodwin founded his own production and talent management company, 40 Partners Ltd.

== Career ==
=== BBC head of strategy, DEC ===
After working as a media consultant in London at IXL and BBC Ventures for various blue chip companies, Goodwin took on the role of head of strategy for BBC Drama, Entertainment, Comedy, Children's and Film ("DEC"), reporting to Alan Yentob. During this time, Goodwin worked closely with BBC programme department heads and other BBC executive directors to develop editorial, business, and financial strategy across DEC programme genres - a circa £500 million production entity that included two digital TV channels and BBC Films.

Goodwin also lead several pan-BBC projects, including the BBC Creative Futures Under-18s workstream with Andy Parfitt.

During his time as head of strategy for DEC, Goodwin drove strategy of digital investment into DEC-related programme areas, helping launch some of the first and most successful digital brands of the BBC, including BBC Fictionlab, BBC Collective, and the BBC Film Network.

In February 2006 Goodwin wrote the BBC's film strategy for Alan Yentob, which included a £100 million boost for the British film industry, in the hope of producing more hits like Billy Elliot.

=== BBC Switch ===
In 2007, in a return to programme-making, Geoff set up BBC Switch, a new BBC brand which was aimed at teenagers.

BBC Switch represented a step forward for the BBC, not only in that it reached out to the underserved age group of 12- to 17-year-olds, but also in that it was multi-platform to a degree not seen at the BBC before. BBC Switch spanned television and radio, but at its heart was an online presence. Switch had its own website, www.bbc.co.uk/switch, but, importantly, also hosted content on external third party sites, including Facebook and YouTube.

Switch's television slot was Saturdays 12pm-2pm on BBC Two. On radio, Switch occupied 7pm onwards on Sunday evenings, and online daily from 5pm.

The team that Goodwin assembled for the development of BBC Switch included Emma Smithwick and Daniel Heaf. The team reported to Jana Bennett, director of TV, and Andy Parfitt, who at that time was the controller of Radio 1, BBC 1 Xtra and BBC Popular Music. At the time, Goodwin described BBC Switch as "committed to offering the best entertainment for British teens in a way that's authentic and fresh".

=== Television ===
Four programmes originally filled the BBC Two slot of Saturdays 12pm-2pm. Sound was a weekly music entertainment and chat show presented by Annie Mac and Nick Grimshaw. Falcon Beach was a coming-of-age drama about teenagers, their passions, relationships, friends, families and enemies. Them was a documentary series that explored the different teenage tribes that exist in Britain today. The Surgery, presented by Jeff Leach, was a chat show for BBC Switch. The Surgery was the television version of The Sunday Surgery, a radio show presented by Kelly Osbourne, which aimed to help teenagers with everyday problems

Switch's flagship programme, and one of the first British dramas to air online, The Cut, premiered in 2010. The Cut was unique in that it aired in five-minute webisodes on the Switch website and via YouTube, before showing in an omnibus on BBC Two. Goodwin commissioned and produced The Cut, which ran for forty episodes with great success. Goodwin created The Cut with director/producer Sarah Walker, producer Pete Gibbons and the award-winning writer Al Smith. He also worked with directors Laura Smith, Alex Kalymnios and Amy Neil and writers Anna McCleery, Grant Black, Emma Smithwick and Vicki Lutas.

In 2008, Goodwin commissioned Class Of 2008 for BBC Switch; an observational documentary that featured the fashion model Daisy Lowe. This was a collaboration with Monkey Kingdom Productions, who later went on to make Made in Chelsea.

In 2009, Goodwin and the Switch team collaborated with Sarah Dillistone at Lime Pictures to make The Season, a constructed reality programme that followed the lives of a group of "saisonnieres" working in the "party capital of the Alps", Val-d'Isère. Lime Pictures later developed the hugely successful The Only Way is Essex.

Revealed..., a journalism and current affairs show which looked at the lives of teens in the UK, presented by Anthony Baxter and Charlotte Ashton, also aired that year, as did Scene Stealers, a "life swap" style format in which teenagers pretend they belong to a different "teen tribe", which Charlie Brooker described as ‘harmless fun’; and docusoap Mission Beach, which followed eight British teenagers taking part in California's renowned Junior Lifeguard Programme.

Meta4orce was an animated interactive detective series about a team of four genetically altered investigators solving high-profile crime cases in the flooded city of London in 2034. It was written by Peter Milligan, a veteran graphic novel writer for DC Comics and Marvel.

Off the Hook was a comedy series about a group of first year university students getting their first taste of independence, starring Jonathan Bailey.

The following year, BBC Switch teamed up with Firecracker Productions to create Single, Together, Whatever, a factual programme which followed a group of teenagers over a three-month period, taking a look at their relationships. The same year, Goodwin’s team collaborated with RSA (Ridley Scott’s production company) to produce Myths, a series of five-minute episodes which told the story of the classic Greek Myths in a modern setting. Popatron, a sitcom based behind the scenes of a celebrity entertainment show also aired that year, as did Shelfstackers, another comedy about four teenagers working at a supermarket.

The last BBC Switch programme was the feature-length musical, Rules of Love, which premiered on 18 December 2010, which was the first modern British urban musical to be made.

=== Online ===
The BBC Switch website was a portal linking teens to content across the BBC including BBC Radio 1, BBC Radio 1Xtra, BBC Blast, and EastEnders.

BBC Switch was an innovative brand within the BBC in that several of its shows were broadcast across television, radio and online. The 5:19 Show, for example, (a television show hosted by Tom Deacon and AJ Odudu) aired online from Monday to Friday at 5:19pm, but then also had a slot on BBC Two. The show was named 5:19 in recognition of the time most teenagers log-on.

In 2008, Goodwin commissioned Benched, a quickfire teen match-making show that took place on a park bench. The programme aired as a series of five-minute "webisodes", filmed on different park benches starring teens from the local area. It was available to watch on the BBC Switch website.

In 2009, Goodwin commissioned and executive produced the BAFTA and international Emmy nominated TV and web series, The Well, a teenage thriller starring Karen Gillan (who later played Amy Pond, assistant to Peter Capaldi’s Doctor Who). The Well aired on BBC Two and extended online to bbc.co.uk/switch, where the audience could immerse themselves further in the story, exploring a spookily atmospheric recreation of the main drama location in a multi-level game.

On Saturday 12 September 2009, the cross-platform Chartjackers aired on BBC 2. This was a documentary that followed four YouTube sensations trying to crowd-source a new track, and get it to number 1. Viewers followed their progress via Twitter and online video blogs, and the result was aired over a half hour on BBC Two. All profits made from the single were donated to Children in Need to help disadvantaged children and young people in the UK.

The Switch brand also included Slink, an online magazine for teenage girls.

=== Radio ===
Switch radio programmes that Goodwin and his team oversaw include The Surgery with Aled and Dr Rhada, a discussion show which focused on issues faced by teenagers and BBC Switch Road Trip with Annie Mac, Nick Grimshaw and Aled Haydn Jones, a musical road trip which took place in live music venues all over the country.

Grimshaw proved a popular choice, largely due to his natural affinity with young people.

Switch was unique in the fact that younger viewers' contributions were also aired. Some were even involved in pre- and post-production roles.

=== Closure of BBC Switch ===
Director general Mark Thompson's strategic review of the corporation's scope and activities included proposals to close the cross media brands BBC Switch and BBC Blast!, which were both aimed at teenagers. In February 2010, The Guardian and The Times newspapers both reported that the BBC Switch website was under threat of closure, in a review of the BBC's online presence.

On 18 December 2010, BBC Switch closed due to a 25% cut in the BBC Online budget, reducing it by £34 million.

=== BBC Worldwide ===
In 2011, following BBC Switch’s closure, Goodwin joined BBC Worldwide to devise a new commercial culture brand, the BBC Culture Club. Under the working title of 'The BBC Culture Club' this project aimed to build a new global BBC Worldwide consumer brand in the Arts, Culture and Film space. Essentially, this new brand was a highly editorialised video on demand service. In this initiative, Goodwin reported to John Smith, who was then Head of BBC Worldwide, and is now Chief Operating Officer for Burberry.

The proposal for BBC Culture Club was that credible key talent would be used to present originated, short-form authoritative pieces to introduce and provide context for the long-form films, TV, radio programming and 3rd party partner content such as exhibitions, festivals and other live events. It was characterised as a high quality British heritage brand (similar to, for example, Burberry or The Economist).

=== 40 Partners ===
In January 2013, after a summer of seed funding, Goodwin set up his own production company come talent agency with chairman Bob Benton, Producer Emma Smithwick and Lawyer Adrian Faulkner.

40 Partners credits include 40 Kids by 20 Women (Channel 5 observational documentary), Witness: Confessions of a Hitman (C&I documentary), Being Mum, and 30 Something (both series of online shorts for AOL with Tess Daly, Rochelle Humes and Richard Bacon).

=== AOL ===
In winter 2016, as head of originals and brand funded video, Goodwin and his 40 Partners non-fiction team were brought in-house to supercharge AOL UK's video ambitions, producing and / or commissioning a range of original series.

=== OATH / Verizon Media ===
In June 2017 Goodwin was director, Video EMEA at Oath (Verizon-owned company that merged AOL and Yahoo!)
