= List of Chartjackers episodes =

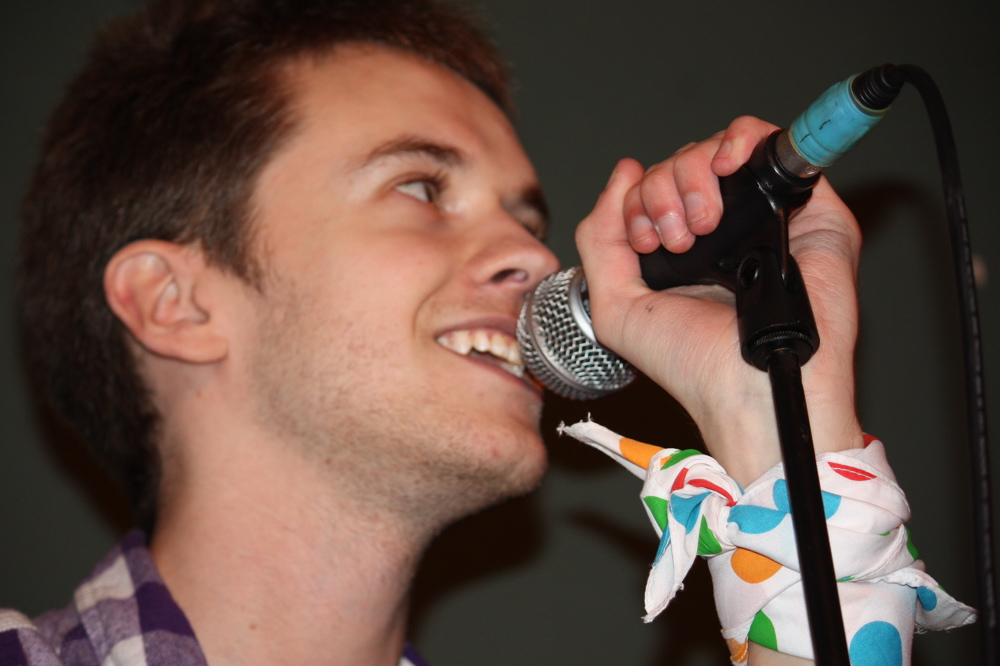
Video blogger Alex Day performing during the ninth episode of Chartjackers.

The British documentary series Chartjackers ran for a single season of eleven weekly episodes during the autumn of 2009. The series documents the lives of four teenage video bloggers—Alex Day, Johnny Haggart, Jimmy Hill, and Charlotte McDonnell (formerly Charlie McDonnell)—from the video-sharing website YouTube as they attempt to write, record and release a pop song by crowdsourcing through social media in ten weeks. When initially aired, the first ten episodes of Chartjackers, each five minutes in length, detailed the events of the previous seven days. The final episode, broadcast on 21 November 2009, compiled highlights from the previous ten weeks into one 30-minute episode, which was narrated by British DJ MistaJam. All eleven episodes were produced by Adam King and Jonathan Davenport of the production company Hat Trick Productions.

Chartjackers was devised in 2009 by Davenport and Andy Mettam of Hat Trick Productions, and was commissioned for development by Geoffrey Goodwin and Jo Twist of BBC Switch. Alongside the programmes Off the Hook and The Cut, it was featured as part of a season of multi-platform content designed to appeal to teenagers. The show was also directly linked to the 2009 annual appeal for the British charity Children in Need – profits from sales of the completed pop song were donated to the charity. Chartjackers aired weekly at approximately 1:10 p.m. on Saturday afternoons on BBC Two, with the first episode premiering on 12 September 2009 during the channel's two-hour long BBC Switch segment. The series garnered a viewing figures peak of almost half a million with its final episode and was critically panned by reviewers. Each episode was streamed online through BBC iPlayer to UK residents for seven days after its initial airing. The series was not broadcast outside the UK and, as of 14 December 2011, is not available to buy on DVD.

As a cross-platform project, Chartjackers was distributed both on television and through alternative media – as well as being streamed online through BBC iPlayer, each episode was also uploaded to the YouTube channel BBCSwitch the same day that it was broadcast on TV. In conjunction with the television episodes, video blogs featuring the four teenagers were uploaded to both the YouTube channels BBCSwitch and ChartJackersProject. Viewers were also able to subscribe to a dedicated Twitter channel, which kept them updated on the progress of the project. Creative content for these online platforms was provided by digital agency Fish in a bottle. Speaking in February 2010, Twist remarked that the use of these online networks during Chartjackers meant that the series had been able to extend social viewing and "connect with [its] audience". She also named the project as one in which she was proudest of being involved.

== Episodes ==
No.	Title	Produced by	Original release date
1	"Episode 1"	Adam King & Jonathan Davenport	12 September 2009
Through a sequence of colourful intertitles, the goal of the Chartjackers project (to crowdsource in ten weeks a pop song that will reach number one on the UK Singles Chart) is explained. The four teenagers—McDonnell, Day, Haggart and Hill—are introduced, and clips are played from "Welcome To ChartJackers!", their first video blog, which was uploaded to the YouTube channel ChartJackersProject on 5 September. The four boys read and respond to some of the comments that have been posted on this video, and encourage viewers to become involved with the project.
2	"Episode 2"	Adam King & Jonathan Davenport	19 September 2009
Having asked on 8 September via a video blog titled "Lyrics Weeks" for viewers to submit potential song lyrics, the four boys receive more than 4000 entries. They review some of the proposed lines, then visit the Royal Opera House in Covent Garden, where operatic singer Robert Murray performs a selection of the lyrics. Next, they travel to The Lock Tavern in north-west London, where Iain Beggs of the band Red Skys sings some more lyrics in a rock music-style. The episode concludes with McDonnell, Day and Hill receiving a phone call from former pop star Chesney Hawkes, who offers the bloggers advice and remarks that he believes that they have "every experience between [them] to actually pull [their aim of reaching number one] off".
3	"Episode 3"	Adam King & Jonathan Davenport	26 September 2009
With the single's lyrics chosen, the bloggers decide to select a melody to accompany them. Day uploads a video to ChartJackersProject, asking viewers to compose a melody for the song. Viewers submit 51 potential melodies, so the group split up to review them. Haggart and Hill speak with pop singer V V Brown, while McDonnell and Day meet British record producer Mike Stock. Brown and Stock each review two melodies and provide feedback on them.
4	"Episode 4"	Adam King & Jonathan Davenport	3 October 2009
The winning melody, composed by a 19-year-old musician named Jonny Dark, is chosen for the track. The group decide to pick vocalists to perform the song, and upload a new video to ChartJackersProject inviting viewers to audition through video responses. For tips on what to look for in the auditions, McDonnell and Day visit vocal coaches David and Carrie Grant, who offer them some advice. On returning, the entire group look through some of the hundreds of video auditions that they have received. This episode also featured a cameo from indie band The Young Knives, who sent the group a video message wishing them luck for their project.
5	"Episode 5"	Adam King & Jonathan Davenport	10 October 2009
Day and Haggart meet with Charlie Simpson of Fightstar, who discusses the differences between releasing music through a major record label and setting up one's own independent label. The bloggers then select their favourite ten singers from the video auditions, and invite them to the second round of auditions at the Wellfield Working Men's Club in Rochdale. The ten auditionees each perform the song, which has been titled "I've Got Nothing", in front of the four boys. Miranda Chartrand, a 19-year-old au pair from Stroud, Gloucestershire, and Adam Nichols, an 18-year-old musician from Essex, are selected from these ten to provide vocals on the single's official release. "I've Got Nothing" was ultimately released by independent label Swinging Mantis.
6	"Episode 6"	Adam King & Jonathan Davenport	17 October 2009
The four bloggers travel with Chartrand and Nichols to Newport, where "I've Got Nothing" is recorded and produced by Marc Dowding, a Creative Sound and Music student from the University of Wales. Day and Haggart meet with Peter Oakley, who achieved a UK Top 40 hit in 2007 as part of The Zimmers, while McDonnell and Hill speak to music video director Corin Hardy, who offers them advice on what should be included in the official video for "I've Got Nothing".
7	"Episode 7"	Adam King & Jonathan Davenport	24 October 2009
The official music video for "I've Got Nothing" is filmed in a London park, with Day directing and McDonnell editing. The video features Chartrand and Nichols dancing and miming to the song, along with an actor dressed as Children in Need mascot Pudsey Bear. To decide how the vocalists should be styled for forthcoming performances of the single, Day, Haggart, Chartrand and Nichols speak with celebrity stylist Hannah Sandling, who presents them with some fashion ideas and suggestions for what the singers could wear. Meanwhile, McDonnell and Hill meet with entertainment journalist Rav Singh, who proposes ways by which the team could promote the single through publicity stunts.
8	"Episode 8"	Adam King & Jonathan Davenport	31 October 2009
Aside from a 20-second preview at 9 p.m. on BBC Radio 1, "I've Got Nothing" has received little radio airplay. The boys decide to take Singh's advice, and choose to promote the single through large publicity stunts. Day and Hill visit the BBC Radio 1 headquarters, and petition the station to give their song airplay. They yell at the building through a megaphone, and demand to meet with Radio 1 DJ Chris Moyles. The duo also hold up large banners promoting Chartjackers. They then move on to 95.8 Capital FM and repeat the same process. Despite this, neither station puts "I've Got Nothing" on any of their playlists, and the single continues not to receive any airplay. The episode ends with clips from video blogs posted to ChartJackersProject by Day and Haggart, encouraging viewers to spam the Twitter feeds of any radio DJ who might play the single on their shows. This episode was subtitled "CRISIS POINT!".
9	"Episode 9"	Adam King & Jonathan Davenport	7 November 2009
The boys attend the London premiere of Disney's A Christmas Carol on 3 November, and Chartjackers receives support from celebrities such as reality TV contestant Chantelle Houghton and indie band Scouting for Girls. The following day, a gathering takes place at the music venue 93 Feet East, where "I've Got Nothing" is performed live for the first time by Chartrand and Nichols. Tickets are sold to the public for £3.50 each on a "First come, first served" basis – the gig itself is headlined by singer Chesney Hawkes. This episode featured a cameo from internet make-up artist Lauren Luke, who sent the boys a video tutorial on how to apply make-up to look like Pudsey Bear.
10	"Episode 10"	Adam King & Jonathan Davenport	14 November 2009
"I've Got Nothing" is released online, exclusively though the iTunes Store. To encourage sales of the single, the boys persuade celebrities such as Ben Miller, Robert Llewellyn and Stephen Fry to promote the song through their Twitter accounts. The midweeks show that the single has barely scraped the UK Singles Chart and entered at number 38, so, to further publicise the track, the four boys make a series of videos promising to carry out dares if the song climbs the charts – McDonnell consumes a spoonful of cinnamon, and Haggart eats a chilli. They also promote the single by performing it at Switch Live 2009, an awards show organised by BBC Switch. To observe how funds raised from sales of "I've Got Nothing" might benefit Children in Need, McDonnell and Haggart visit the Keynsham and District Mencap Society Saturday Club at the Three Ways School in Bath, Somerset.
11	"Compilation"	Adam King & Jonathan Davenport	21 November 2009
The entire Chartjackers journey is recounted through a series of clips from previous episodes by British DJ MistaJam. Selected highlights include reviewing the submitted video auditions, selecting Chartrand and Nichols to perform on the single, recording the song, filming the music video, and petitioning BBC Radio 1 and 95.8 Capital FM to play the track. In an additional scene not taken from an earlier episode, McDonnell and Day visit the radio station BBC Radio 1Xtra, where it is revealed that "I've Got Nothing" peaked at number 36 on the UK Singles Chart. Although proud of their achievement, the boys are mildly disappointed.
