= John F. Ross Collegiate Vocational Institute =

Location
- 21 Meyer Drive; Guelph, Ontario, N1E 4H1; Canada; 43.56138°N 80.24665°W

Information
- School type: Public
- Motto: Respect: give it, get it. It goes both ways (Always Progressing)
- Founded: 1956
- School board: Upper Grand District School Board
- Principal: Heather Pierce
- Staff: ≈ 120
- Grades: 9-12+
- Enrollment: ≈ 2200 (September 2024)
- Language: English, French
- Area: North-east Guelph
- Colour: Royal blue
- Mascot: Captain Royal
- Team name: Royals
- Nobel laureates: David Card
- Website: www.ugdsb.ca/jfr/

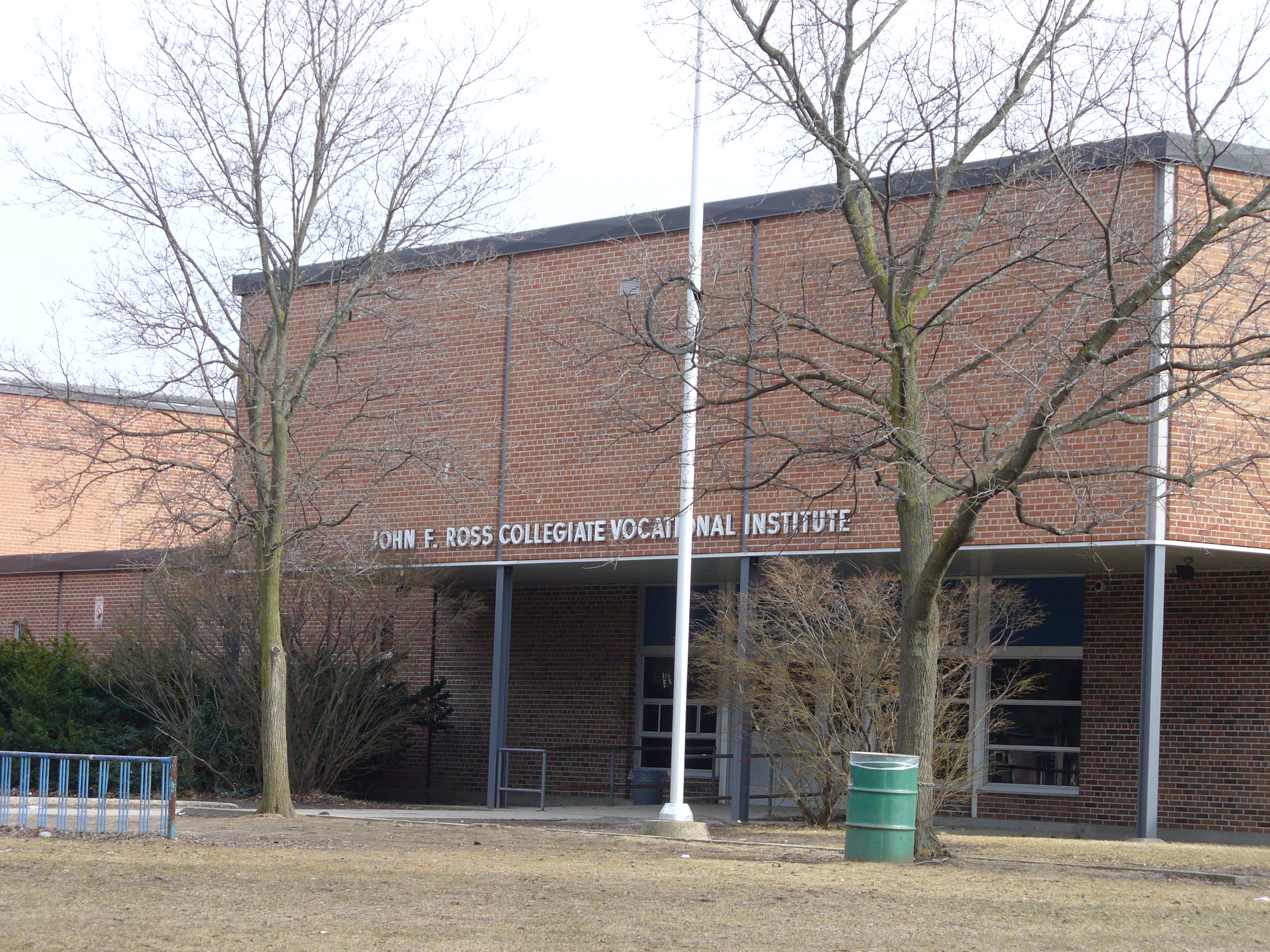

The John F. Ross Collegiate Vocational Institute is a grade 9–12 public secondary school in Guelph, Ontario, Canada and is part of the Upper Grand District School Board.

== History ==
Guelph's largest high school was originally named John F. Ross Vocational School, in honour of John Francis Ross, a highly respected Guelph educator and principal. The school opened its doors in 1956 to 460 students with 25 teachers and Lorne Fox as its principal, under the new name John F. Ross Collegiate Vocational Institute. It celebrated its 50th anniversary with a reunion in May 2006.

== Academic programs ==
It is the only high school in the Upper Grand District School Board that offers French Immersion and English as Second Language program (grades 9–12). In addition, Ross offers programs in business, technology, drama, music, art, science, social sciences and co-op. As part of its standard classes, the school also offers special education classes for exceptional students. Ross also has a co-operative learning program in which local employers are matched with students for on-the-job training.

Students also have opportunities to learn outside of the school. For example, the Music and Geography departments offer an extended field trip to a major city or destination (i.e., New York City, Chicago, Washington, D.C. and Boston) each spring. Annual March Break trips are offered to students as well. Recent trips offered include China in 2011, Eastern Europe in 2011, Africa (Me to We), Greece and Turkey in 2012, France in 2013, and Italy, Switzerland and Austria in March 2014.

The school has the largest population of any school in the Upper Grand District School Board, with an estimated 2000 students (Fall 2014). This is due to its proximity to the downtown core as well as drawing in many students from the surrounding rural areas including nearby towns such as Rockwood.

== Sports ==
The school always had a fierce athletic rivalry with the Centennial Spartans. In 2006, the women's rugby team competed at OFSAA and clinched a 3rd place. In 2006 and 2008, the boys' baseball team was eliminated in the semi-finals in a game that needed extra innings against St. Michael's College School, and a loss to the eventual 2008 OFSAA champions Notre Dame Irish, respectively. In 2007, the boys' hockey team, won the OFSAA Championship in Whitby, Ontario.

In the fall of 2009 the Royals defeated the Guelph Collegiate Gaels in District 10 football action to win city championship 13–7, their first title, in 11 years. The Ross football team had gone 0–15 in the regular season of 2010 before losing to the Centennial Spartans at home in the D10 Quarter-Finals. In the 2011 season; the Royals beat the Lourdes Crusaders, 24–7 on November 11, 2011. They had their third straight losing season with a 33–7 loss to the Our Lady of Lourdes Crusader.

Ross's Junior Boys' basketball team lost the 2011 District 10 City Championship to Orangeville Bears in a lopsided affair, before advanced to CWOSSA and losing in round Robin to St. Mary's of Kitchener. The Senior Boys' Basketball team lost in the District 10 quarter-final game to the Orangeville Bears. They advanced to CWOSSA and the Final before losing to St. Mary's of Kitchener. They did advance to OFSAA with a second-place finish.

=== Track and Field ===
The Ross Royals track and field team has had an ongoing tradition of success rich with records and OFSAA medals since the early 1970s. The school records held at John F. Ross contain many of the top performances in District 10 history.

==== 1970's ====
Some of the earliest instances of major success still on record comes from athletes Barb Becker, Chris Laubach, Dave Rouleau, John Elkerton, Lori Mckay, and John Settle. Throughout their high school career the six of them alone amassed a staggering 17 OFSAA medals and 5 OFSAA titles between 1973 and 1978. These provincial champions were accompanied by many other talented athletes that made up the 1970s "powerhouse" team led by coaches Donald Ranson and Don Sykes. Over 40 years later the athletes of that era still hold 27 school records. Rouleau even managed to claim the OFSAA record in the midget boys’ high jump in 1973 with a jump of 6 ft 2 1/4 in (1.886 m).

==== 1980's ====
The John F. Ross track and field team continued to thrive off their momentum throughout the early 1980s. As the team saw the last of the 1970s champions graduate, new athletes were showing promising talent, especially in the sprints. In 1980 the team achieved its first ever OFSAA gold medal in a relay event. The women's 4 × 400 m title was won in a time of 3:57.2, the school's third fastest time to this day. In the following year at the 1981 OFSAA championships the girls defended their title with the same four runners. Their finishing time of 3:56.04 became a school record that still stands as of 2019.

==== 1990's ====
In the 1990s two distance runners took a shot at the record board. The first to come was Drew Graham who twice won the OFSAA bronze medal in the midget (1993) and junior (1995) 3000m. Graham currently owns the school record in the 3000m in all three age categories. In 1992, Graham also won an OFSAA gold medal as a midget in cross country. In 1996 a newcomer to the track team named Carla Briante won John F. Ross' first OFSAA track and field title since the women's 4 × 400 m gold in 1981. Her OFSAA winning 1500m time of 4:46.43 was held as the school record for 11 years until June 2017. Briante went on to take the junior records for the 1500m and 3000m which remain unbeaten. In 1995, Briante also won an OFSAA gold medal as a midget in cross country.

==== Records ====
Midget Girls

Event	Performance	Athlete(s)	Year
100m	11.92	E. Johnson	2002
200m	24.42	E. Johnson	2002
400m	57.8	L. Mackay	1978
800m	2:14.92	H. Davis	2017
1500m	4:37.96	H. Davis	2017
3000m	11:24.00	T. Embree	2016
80m Hurdles	12.6	S. Burnside	1979
300m Hurdles	49.84	L. Rayner A. Sutton	2006 2012
Shot Put	10.45m	C. Laubach	1975
Discus	28.95m	B. Becker	1974
Javelin	32.54m	B. Becker	1974
High Jump	1.64m	C. Few	1980
Long Jump	4.92m	A. Prilesnik	2018
Triple Jump	10.63m	J. Johnson	2005
Pole Vault	-	-	-
4 × 100 m	53.22	A. Griffin E. Fritzley R. Blower H. Davis	2017

Junior Girls

Event	Performance	Athlete(s)	Year
100m	12.12	E. Johnson	2003
200m	24.46	E. Johnson	2003
400m	56.51	A. Fraser	2011
800m	2:11.9	L. Mackay	1980
1500m	4:42.73	H. Davis	2018
3000m	10:25.46	H. Davis	2018
80m Hurdles	11.7	S. Burnside	1981
300m Hurdles	47.58	E. Bowerman	2011
Shot Put	11.69m	L. Wedel	2015
Discus	33.12m	B. Becker	1975
Javelin	37.26	A. Devorski	1978
High Jump	1.53m	S. Lussier	2014
Long Jump	5.18m	K. Mcnally	2006
Triple Jump	11.28m	A. Woods	2014
Pole Vault	2.50m	J. Johnson	2006
4 × 100 m	51.56	H. Rayner M. Adams L. Rayner K.A. Cornwall	2007

Senior Women

Event	Performance	Athlete(s)	Year
100m	12.08	E. Johnson	2004
200m	24.41	A. Fraser	2012
400m	56.06	A. Fraser	2012
800m	2:17.22	S. Welch	2015
1500m	4:40.5	S. Fleck	1980
3000m	10:37.66	H. Davis	2019
100m Hurdles	14.20	E. Bowerman	2012
400m Hurdles	1:09.82	L. Rayner	2010
Shot Put	10.98m	L. Juchnik	1986
Discus	33.59m	D. Martin-Nino	2015
Javelin	33.94m	L. Stevens	2018
High Jump	1.59m	S. Fleck	1981
Long Jump	5.54m	A. Woods	2015
Triple Jump	11.34m	A. Woods	2015
Pole Vault	2.30m	A. Woods	2016
Steeplechase	5:31.13	P. Parker	2012
4 × 100 m	48.57	H. Rayner A. Fraser M. Biffis E. Bowerman K.A. Cornwall	2010
4 × 400 m	3:56.04	J. Brown S. Burnside K. Cece S. Fleck	1981

Midget Boys

Event	Performance	Athlete(s)	Year
100m	11.3	J. Elkerton	1977
200m	23.6	J. Elkerton	1977
400m	53.9	R. Polo	-
800m	1:59.5	J. Settle	1975
1500m	4:11.2	J. Settle	1975
3000m	9:20.0	D. Graham	1993
100m Hurdles	14.80	J. Gregorio	1995
300m Hurdles	44.28	L. Stojanovic	2017
Shot Put	14.68m	M. Parkinson	1979
Discus	40.56m	J. Wolters	1975
Javelin	49.56m	T. Marko	1995
High Jump	1.91m	D. Rouleau	1974
Long Jump	6.35m	A. Lee	2014
Triple Jump	12.36m	S. Hood	1973
Pole Vault	3.23m	B. Mcewen	2002
4 × 100 m	47.44	L. Smith E. Jimenez B. Work A. Lee	2014

Junior Boys

Event	Performance	Athlete(s)	Year
100m	11.2	J. Elkerton	1979
200m	22.5	M. Stubbert	1973
400m	52.25	S. Adams	-
800m	1:55.7	J. Settle	1977
1500m	3:59.9	J. Settle	1977
3000m	8:56.70	D. Graham	1995
100m Hurdles	14.44	A. Lee	2015
300m Hurdles	40.91	J. Gregorio	1996
Shot Put	14.01m	J. Wolters	1977
Discus	43.78m	G. Heffernan	1991
Javelin	52.53m	B. Comín	2016
High Jump	1.96m	D. Rouleau	1975
Long Jump	6.77m	A. Lee	2015
Triple Jump	12.98m	A. Lee	2015
Pole Vault	3.70m	B. Comín	2016
4 × 100 m	46.01	G. Williams Ayyan Malik J. Denton R. Kanerva K.Abdulrahem C. Christian	2025

Senior Men

Event	Performance	Athlete(s)	Year
100m	11.29	A. Lee	2016
200m	23.00	G. Kuruneri	2004
400m	49.8	D. Rouleau	1977
800m	1:53.6	J. Settle	1978
1500m	3:53.6	J. Settle	1978
3000m	8:48.03	D. Graham	1996
100m Hurdles	15.20	S. Wu	2012
300m Hurdles	55.27	C. Sutton	2012
Shot Put	16.02m	J. Wolters	1979
Discus	47.40m	J. Wolters	1979
Javelin	55.96m	M. Brown	1974
High Jump	2.00m	A. Lee	2018
Long Jump	7.20m	A. Lee	2018
Triple Jump	13.53m	H. Huang	2019
Pole Vault	4.25m	B. Mcewen	2005
Steeplechase	6:06.55	L. Stiles	2013
4 × 100 m	45.23	E. Jimenez A. Lee L. Ramshaw N. Lee	2017
4 × 400 m	3:23.03	S. Wu L. Stiles J. Mah C. Sutton	2012

OFSAA

Swimming: 100 Metre Backstroke- open girls: 2013-Emma Ball: 1:02.10 R 2014-Emma Ball: 1:02.67

200 Metre Individual Medley- open girls: 2015-Sophia Papadedes: 2:22.85

Girl's SWAD 100 Metre Freestyle: 2012-Alicia Denoon: 1:15.09 2013-Alicia Denoon: 1:16.23

== Extracurricular activities and clubs ==
- All Board Permitted Sports
- Arts Council
- Athletic Council
- AP English Club
- AP French
- Band & Choir Jr and Sr
- Battle of the Bands
- Best Buddies
- Book Club
- Business Club
- Canadian Open Math Challenge
- Chemistry Club
- Christians In Action
- Concert Band
- Concert Choir
- Debating Club
- Doctor Who Club
- ECO Team
- E.L. Fox Stage Crew
- Equity Council
- Fine Arts Club
- Improv Club
- Multicultural Festival
- Robotics Club
- RSB - DECA Chapter
- Save The Future
- Students' Council
- Royal Jazz
- Royal Rhythm
- Sidekicks
- Trivia Club
- Youth Alpha

== Volunteerism ==
Each spring, up to four families of mallard ducks fly to the school, where they have a safe environment to raise their young. Eventually, the school's Environment Club relocates the ducks and ducklings to nearby wildlife preserves. The school looks after the birds' surroundings. Over the years John F. Ross has donated tens of thousands of dollars to charity.

During the 2008–2009 school year, the school took part in the Spread the Net challenge promoted by Rick Mercer. By the end of the competition the school had raised more than $55,000 to help fight malaria, the highest total in Canada for any school. As a result, the famous comedian visited the school in March 2009 and John F. Ross was featured on Mercer's television show, the Rick Mercer Report. The school took part in the campaign once again in 2015 raising over $41,000 for the Spread the Net Challenge. Rick Mercer once again visited the school and congratulated John F. Ross on raising over $100 000 total for the charity over the years.

On a smaller scale, the students' council runs an annual fundraising event called F.R.O.S.T.Y. (Friendly Royals Offering Stuff To Yuletide) in December. For two weeks, classes set up events such as bake sales, video game parties, or a chance to slime a teacher, all to raise money for local nonprofit organizations and charities. There is also a weekly "Save the Future" collection that brings in a few hundred dollars every week toward a variety of good causes.

== Notable alumni ==
=== Actors ===
- Shaun Benson (1976 – ), known for his role as Dr. Steven Webber in General Hospital
- Neve Campbell (1973 – ), known for her roles as Sidney Prescott in Scream and as Julia Salinger in Party of Five
- Noah Danby (1974 – ), actor known for his role as Connor King in Painkiller Jane

=== Architects ===
- Alison Brooks (1962 – ), winner of the RIBA Stirling Prize in 2008

=== Athletes ===
- Billy Bridges (1984 – ), ice sledge hockey and wheelchair basketball player who won a gold medal at the 2006 Winter Paralympics
- Michael Faulds (1983 – ), head coach of the Wilfrid Laurier Golden Hawks football team since 2013
- Doug Risebrough (1954 – ), professional ice hockey player in the NHL from 1975 – 1987

=== Economists ===
- David Card (1956 – ), awarded half of the 2021 Nobel Memorial Prize in Economic Sciences

=== Journalists ===
- J David Akin (1963, Guelph, ON ), chief political correspondent for Global News

=== Mathematicians ===
- Doug Stinson (1956 – ), author of mathematics-based cryptography textbook Cryptography: Theory and Practice (ISBN 9781584885085)

=== Musicians ===
- Miranda Chartrand (1990 – ), known for her song I've Got Nothing on the BBC television series Chartjackers

== See also ==
- Education in Ontario
- List of secondary schools in Ontario
- Upper Grand District School Board (UGDSB)
