= Andy Parfitt =

British radio administrator

- Born: Bristol, England
- Occupation: British radio administrator

Andrew John Parfitt is a British radio administrator. He was the controller of BBC Radio 1 in the United Kingdom, and held that role from 1998 to 2011, taking over from Matthew Bannister. He was also the controller of BBC Radio 1Xtra, BBC Asian Network, BBC Popular Music and BBC Switch. In October 2011 he was appointed executive director of talent for ad agency Saatchi & Saatchi.

== Early life and education ==
Andrew John Parfitt was born in Bristol, England.

He attended Ashton Park Comprehensive School in Bower Ashton, Bristol. He then went to the Bristol Old Vic Theatre School]

From 1978 to 1979, he was the assistant stage manager at the Bristol Arts Centre, and later attended the Wharton School of the University of Pennsylvania.

== Career ==
=== Early career ===
Parfitt joined the BBC in 1980 working as a studio manager.

He spent some time with BFBS in the Falkland Islands, before returning to the UK in 1984. He became a producer in BBC Education in 1985, then joined Radio 4 in 1987 and produced Pick of the Week and Bookshelf. He helped set up BBC Radio 5, and became the network's assistant editor in 1989. He joined Radio 1 as chief assistant to the controller in 1993. A year later he was promoted first to editor, commissioning and planning and soon after to managing editor. in 1997, he became the network's deputy controller when Matthew Bannister was appointed director of BBC Radio.

=== BBC management ===
In March 1998, Parfitt was appointed controller of Radio 1. During his time as controller he refocussed the station on a core target audience of 16-24 year old listeners. In 2002, he oversaw the launch of BBC Radio 1Xtra, a digital radio service for fans of new black music.

Subsequently, Parfitt was instrumental in changes to the Radio 1 daytime output including the appointment of Chris Moyles as the Radio 1 Breakfast Show host in January 2004, as well as the 2006 reshuffle which saw Colin Murray move to 10pm. This saw a sustained improvement in RAJAR ratings with the station reaching the ten million mark in listenership. Although much of this was down to Moyles (who often referred to Parfitt as "Parf Daddy"), many other shows, particularly Scott Mills, saw increases.

In July 2006 Parfitt was appointed the BBC's Teen Tzar. This made him head of all teenage entertainment – with a view of making sure the BBC offers a wider choice to the 11–25 age group.

In July 2007 Parfitt presented a two part series for BBC Radio 4 entitled California Dreaming.

In November 2007, Parfitt was assigned by then BBC director general, Mark Thompson, as part of the Creative Futures project, to look at the BBC output for children and teens, and suggest future directions for success with those groups. Parfitt, along with Geoffrey Goodwin, submitted a report that showed that the BBC needed to do something specifically for the 12-16-year-old age group, and Parfitt was appointed to the role of programming such content.

In December 2007 Bob Shennan, the controller of BBC Radio 5 Live moved to Channel 4 to manage its new three radio stations, leaving Parfitt temporarily in charge of BBC Radio 5 Live and BBC Radio 5 Sports Extra and the Asian Network.

In December 2007, Parfitt was criticised for only authorising a cut version of The Pogues "Fairytale of New York", censoring the words "slut" and "faggot". This decision was later reversed after widespread media coverage, and a decision by sister station Radio 2 to play the track uncensored.

In December 2008 it was announced that Parfitt's role within the BBC was to be expanded and he was taking on the role of Controller of BBC Popular Music in addition to his existing portfolio that included Radio 1, 1Xtra, Asian Network and BBC Switch. As part of his responsibilities, the Radio 1 controller would also oversee the pan-BBC music event The Electric Proms. Parfitt had been caretaking the role since Lesley Douglas resigned from the post.

In March 2009, he climbed Mount Kilimanjaro along with Radio 1 presenters Chris Moyles, Fearne Cotton and seven other celebrities for Comic Relief 2009.

=== Move to Saatchi & Saatchi ===
On 21 July 2011 it was announced Parfitt would leave Radio 1 at the end of July, after 13 years at the station. He was succeeded as acting controller by Ben Cooper.

In October 2011 he was appointed executive director of talent for ad agency Saatchi & Saatchi.

== Other activities and roles ==
Parfitt is a Fellow of the Radio Academy.

He has been chair of the UK charity Youth Music.

Media offices
Preceded by Matthew Bannister	Controller, BBC Radio 1; 1998– July 2011	Succeeded by Ben Cooper
