= Anthony Baxter =

Anthony Baxter may refer to:

- Anthony S. Baxter (born 1982), British journalist and broadcaster
- Anthony Baxter (filmmaker), British documentary director and producer
