= Ben Cooper (media executive) =

British journalist, radio producer and media executive

Ben Cooper is a British conservative journalist, radio producer and media executive. He was the final Controller of Radio 1, BBC Radio 1Xtra and BBC Asian Network from 2011 to 2020, replacing Andy Parfitt, after which the position was abolished and replaced by Heads of Stations. He was replaced at Radio 1 by Aled Haydn Jones.

== Career ==
Cooper started his career at BBC Hereford & Worcester. He also worked as a journalist at Three Counties Radio before becoming a producer at Radio 1. After a brief stint at Capital Radio as an executive producer, Cooper returned to Radio 1 where he became Head of Mainstream, then later Head of Programmes between 2006 and 2009, where he brought Vernon Kay to the network. He was appointed the station's Deputy Controller in 2009 and oversaw a major restructuring of programming, which included introducing Fearne Cotton and Greg James as weekday presenters. He became Acting Controller in July 2011 following Andy Parfitt's decision to step down as Controller, and was appointed as Controller with immediate effect on 28 October 2011.

As controller of Radio 1, 1Xtra and Asian Network, Cooper has overseen the development of Live Lounge, Radio 1's Teen Awards and Radio 1's Big Weekend. He is responsible for the overall leadership and editorial content of the three stations, whose reach is a combined weekly audience of over 12 million on radio, 10 million social users, and 14 million weekly video viewers.

Cooper was instrumental in the removal of Chris Moyles from the station and the installation of Nick Grimshaw in the breakfast slot as part of Radio 1's move towards a younger listenership and the ultimate shedding of over a million listeners

In April 2013, Cooper banned the single "Ding-Dong! The Witch Is Dead" from being played in full on Radio 1, once it had achieved number 2 status in the British pop charts, following the death of former PM, Margaret Thatcher.

Cooper joined Bauer Radio in 2020, and was promoted to chief content and music office in 2021. His arrival coincided with a number of high-profile personnel moves from BBC Radio to Bauer.

== See also ==
- Radio 1 Madonna controversy
