= Chartjackers =

British documentary series, produced by Hat Trick Productions

- Genre: Documentary; Reality television
- Developed by: Andy Mettam
- Starring: Miranda Chartrand; Alex Day; Marc Dowding; Johnny Haggart; Jimmy Hill; Charlotte McDonnell (formerly Charlie McDonnell); Adam Nichols
- Narrated by: MistaJam
- Opening theme: "Put 'Em Under Pressure" by Republic of Ireland Football Squad
- Country of origin: United Kingdom
- Original language: English
- No. of series: 1
- No. of episodes: 11 (list of episodes)

Production
- Executive producer: Jonathan Davenport
- Producer: Adam King
- Editor: Will Hodgson
- Camera setup: Single-camera
- Running time: 10× 5 minutes; 1× 30 minutes
- Production company: Hat Trick Productions

Original release
- Network: BBC Two
- Release: 12 September – 21 November 2009

Chartjackers is a British documentary series, produced by Hat Trick Productions and commissioned by BBC Switch. It documents the lives of four teenage video bloggers over the course of ten weeks, as they attempt to write, record and release a pop song for charity, with the goal to "sell an estimated 25,000 singles to achieve their dream of a number one single". It premiered in the UK on 12 September 2009 on BBC Two, and ran for a single series of eleven weekly episodes. When first broadcast, the programme ran in real time: its first ten episodes documented the events of the previous seven days, while the final episode was an extended compilation that summarised all ten weeks.

The Chartjackers single was written entirely through crowdsourcing, with the song's title, lyrics, melody, singers, band, production, cover art and music video all being solicited from the global online community. The crowdsourcing took the format of the four bloggers—Alex Day, Johnny Haggart, Jimmy Hill and Charlotte McDonnell (formerly Charlie McDonnell)—posting videos to a dedicated YouTube channel named ChartJackersProject, where they invited viewers to suggest various ideas for the final song. After receiving advice from industry experts such as Charlie Simpson and David and Carrie Grant, the completed Chartjackers single, entitled "I've Got Nothing", was released through the iTunes Store at the end of the ten-week period on 9 November. The track received mainly negative reviews from music critics and sold approximately 8,400 copies in the UK, earning it a peak position of number 36 on the UK Singles Chart.

Chartjackers garnered a viewing figures peak of almost half a million with its final episode and was critically panned by reviewers. Some commentators felt that the programme's concept was ridiculous and doomed from the start, others felt that the series showed a contempt for music and the general public, and other critics questioned whether the point of the project was to raise money for charity or for the four bloggers to promote themselves. The show was nominated for a 2010 Broadcast Digital Award in the Best Multi-Platform Project category, but lost out to The Operation...Surgery Live.

== Production ==
=== Concept ===
Chartjackers was devised in 2009 by Jonathan Davenport and Andy Mettam of the British production company Hat Trick Productions. It was commissioned by Geoffrey Goodwin and Jo Twist of the television brand BBC Switch, and was featured as part of a season of multi-platform content intended to appeal to teenagers. The show was billed as a "YouTube X Factor", with its main focus being its direct link to the 2009 annual appeal for the British charity Children in Need – profits from sales of the completed single were donated to the charity. Chartjackers was executively produced by Davenport, Hat Trick's digital department head, who had previously worked on similar cross-platform projects that incorporated both television and online media, such as the video podcast of Have I Got News For You and the YouTube-based series Bryony Makes a Zombie Movie. Digital agency Fish in a bottle were commissioned to provide creative content for the online platforms, such as the YouTube channel and Twitter account.

=== Casting ===
As a cross-platform project that incorporated YouTube, it was important that the video bloggers cast for the leading team already had a large fanbase – the four bloggers chosen had a combined YouTube subscriber total of over 200,000. They were selected for their familiarity to young British YouTube viewers and to "act as Pied Pipers to the teen audience". Miranda Chartrand and Adam Nichols, the vocalists who sang on the completed Chartjackers single, were cast halfway through the programme's series as part of an audition process and were featured in the remainder of the episodes.

=== Filming locations ===
Although much of Chartjackers was filmed in and around London—such as a gathering at music venue 93 Feet East during episode nine and the music video for "I've Got Nothing" during episode seven—various locations were featured throughout the series. Vocalist auditions in episode five took place at the Wellfield Working Men's Club in Rochdale, and the single itself was recorded at the University of Wales in Newport. During episode nine, some of the team visited the Three Ways School in Bath, Somerset.

== Series overview ==
Chartjackers documented the lives of Day, Haggart, Hill and McDonnell as they attempted to write, record and release a charity single through crowdsourcing. The series was shown in real time, with each of the first ten episodes detailing the events of the previous seven days. On 5 September 2009, one week before the programme's first episode aired, the group announced on the YouTube channel ChartJackersProject their intention to release a number one single within their ten-week time frame. A different task would be undertaken each week, so that, by the end of the project, the song would be completed.

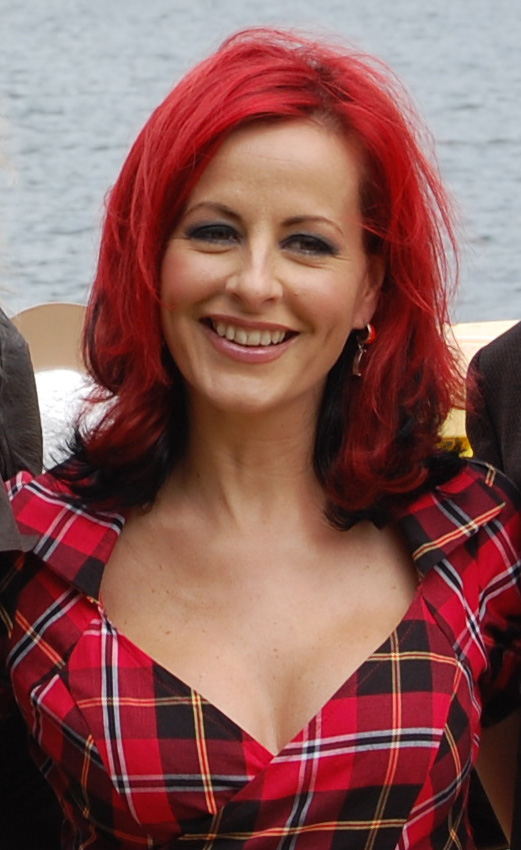
Vocal coach Carrie Grant offered advice to the boys during episode four of Chartjackers.

The first episode of Chartjackers documented the events of the first week of the project and explained what its ultimate goal was. To generate potential lyrics, viewers were asked each to post one line as a comment to a video on ChartJackersProject. Viewers posted more than 4,000 comments, from which were selected the winning lines. These lyrics were posted to the Internet the following episode, with the chorus having been composed by YouTube user blakeisno1 and the repeated phrase "I've Got Nothing" chosen for the song's title. ChartJackersProject viewers were then asked to create a melody for the lyrics and submit it in a video response, so that one could be selected for the single.

Out of a total of 51 melodies that had been sent in, the winning entry by Jonny Dark was chosen from them during episode three. It was also revealed that a band would be put together to perform the Chartjackers single and that any potential members should apply by submitting video auditions. Episode four documented some of the hundreds of auditions that had been sent in – the group reviewed these auditions and selected from them their ten favourites to go through as finalists. These ten finalists performed for the four boys during episode five, where Chartrand, a 19-year-old au pair from Stroud, Gloucestershire, and Nichols, an 18-year-old musician from Essex, were selected to sing on the official release. During episode six, "I've Got Nothing" was recorded in Newport by record producer Marc Dowding, and the group received advice from video director Corin Hardy on how to film the official music video.

Taking Hardy's advice, the music video for "I've Got Nothing" was filmed during the seventh episode of Chartjackers. To begin promoting its release, the team also petitioned 95.8 Capital FM and BBC Radio 1 to try to get the radio coverage for the single, but it was not playlisted and received no airplay. The boys feared that the song would not chart at all, so, during episode eight, they urged viewers to spam the Twitter feeds of radio DJs who could play the single on their shows. In the next episode, a gathering took place at 93 Feet East in London on 4 November, where the single was performed live for the first time by Chartrand and Nichols. During the tenth episode, "I've Got Nothing" was released online. The midweek charts placed the single at Number 39, but its sales increased after comedian Stephen Fry—who provided an outro for McDonnell's YouTube videos—was convinced to promote it on his Twitter profile. Episode eleven, the final compilation episode, revealed on The Radio 1 Chart Show that "I've Got Nothing" had reached number 36 on the UK Singles Chart, which disappointed the boys.

=== Celebrity guests ===
Over the course of the series, several figures from both the music and entertainment industry made an appearance on Chartjackers, usually to offer advice or encouragement to the four boys. The first celebrity to feature on the show was former pop star Chesney Hawkes, who remarked that he felt that the team had "every experience between [them] to actually pull [their aim of reaching number one] off". During the fourth episode, vocal coaches David and Carrie Grant offered advice to the group on what criteria to use when judging the submitted video auditions, and indie rock band The Young Knives sent in a video message, wishing the team success. The following episode, Charlie Simpson of Fightstar explained to the boys the differences between releasing music through major and independent labels. During episode six, the team met with Peter Oakley, who spoke about his own chart success as part of The Zimmers, and Hardy, who advised ways in which the music video could be filmed. The next episode, the group received advice from celebrity stylist Hannah Sandling, who suggested how Chartrand and Nichols should be styled for the video, and entertainment journalist Rav Singh, who discussed how to get airplay for "I've Got Nothing" through publicity stunts.

== Reception ==
=== Critical reception ===
[Chartjackers] stands as a shining example of how all the goodwill in the world isn't going to guarantee mass public support and so setting out a defined aim (such as a Number One single) which fails to take into account this one final variable will inevitably result in a small sense of "failure" when the true reality of reality TV finally kicks in.

— James Masterton of Yahoo! Music

Critical reaction to Chartjackers was overwhelmingly negative. Although radio stations, newspapers and magazines were all canvassed, the show was largely ignored by the mainstream media and received generally negative reviews. It was misrepresented in an article on The Times's website, which mistook the four boys for a new boy band. Fraser McAlpine of BBC Radio 1's Chart Blog said that the project showed a basic "contempt for music" and "the public at large". James Masterton of Yahoo! Music called Chartjackers "something of a failure" and its charting "lacklustre". He did not mention it at all in his weekly chart podcast. Neither Reggie Yates nor Scott Mills, two of the DJs whose Twitter feeds were spammed during episode eight, were impressed by the way that the Chartjackers team had tried to get their attention.

Similarly negative reviews came from Eammon Forde of Music Week, who said the decision to release the single without management was "ridiculous" and that the campaign was "doomed", and Pocket-lint, who described the show as a "car crash". In the week of the single's release, Irish television personality Stephen Byrne questioned on his Twitter profile whether the main motivation for the project really was "charity" – British comedian David Bass agreed with him. The project was quickly overshadowed by a similar, more successful campaign to get "Killing in the Name" by American metal band Rage Against the Machine to top the UK Singles Chart for Christmas 2009.

=== Awards ===
Chartjackers received one nomination at the 2010 Broadcast Digital Awards, a British awards event commemorating success and creativity in digital television. The show was submitted in the Best Multi-Platform Project category, but was beaten by The Operation: Surgery Live. It was not nominated for any further awards.

Year	Award	Category	Result
2010	Broadcast Digital Awards	Best Multi-Platform Project	Nominated

== Distribution ==
Chartjackers was distributed both on television and online. It ran for a single series of eleven episodes: the first ten episodes lasted for five minutes each, with the final compilation episode running for half an hour and gaining a viewership peak of half a million. Chartjackers premiered on BBC Two on 12 September 2009 at 12:50 p.m., as part of the channel's two-hour-long BBC Switch segment – it was uploaded to the YouTube channel BBCSwitch the same day. This practice of broadcasting an episode on BBC Two and uploading it to the BBCSwitch channel the same day continued throughout the series. Episodes were also streamed online through BBC iPlayer to UK residents for seven days after their initial broadcast. The show was not broadcast outside of the UK and, as of 20 September 2013, is not available on DVD.

== I've Got Nothing ==
The completed Chartjackers single was released worldwide exclusively through the iTunes Store at midnight on 9 November 2009. Each copy was sold for £0.79 in the UK and $0.99 in the US. Just under 8,400 copies were downloaded in the UK, giving "I've Got Nothing" a chart placing of number 36 in the UK Singles Chart. The song sold approximately 20,000 copies worldwide, but did not make the singles chart in any other country.

Like the series from which it originated, "I've Got Nothing" was poorly received by critics. Some called the effort "very bad" and others predicted that it was "unlikely to make much of a top 40 impact". The music video for "I've Got Nothing" featured footage of Chartrand and Nichols singing the song in a London park, along with an actor dressed as Children in Need mascot Pudsey Bear. This footage, along with clips of viewers miming to the song, was then used to construct the final music video for the single, which McDonnell edited.

"I've Got Nothing" was performed live twice. The first occasion was at the 93 Feet East gathering on 4 November 2009, during the promotion of the single's release. The gathering featured performances from other YouTube users and was headlined by Hawkes. The second occurrence was four days later at Switch Live 2009, an awards show organised by BBC Switch at the Hammersmith Apollo, where a performance of "I've Got Nothing" opened the event.

== See also ==
- 2009 in British television
- Alternative media
- List of YouTube personalities
