= Me and My Sister =

English pop band from the Isle of Wight

Me and My Sister were an English pop band from the Isle of Wight, made up of sisters, Vicki and Becky Lutas. They are best known for their performance on GMTV. In 2010 they became a full band when musicians Luke Steen and Ross Mabey joined and together they performed at Bestival 2010.

The band had their song "Speaking on the Telephone" used on the BBC teenage drama series The Cut.

== Members ==
- Vicki Lutas – lead vocals, guitar
- Becky Lutas – lead vocals, keyboard
- Luke Steen – drums, keyboard, vocals
- Ross Mabey – bass guitar
