= Tina Daheley =

English journalist and television presenter

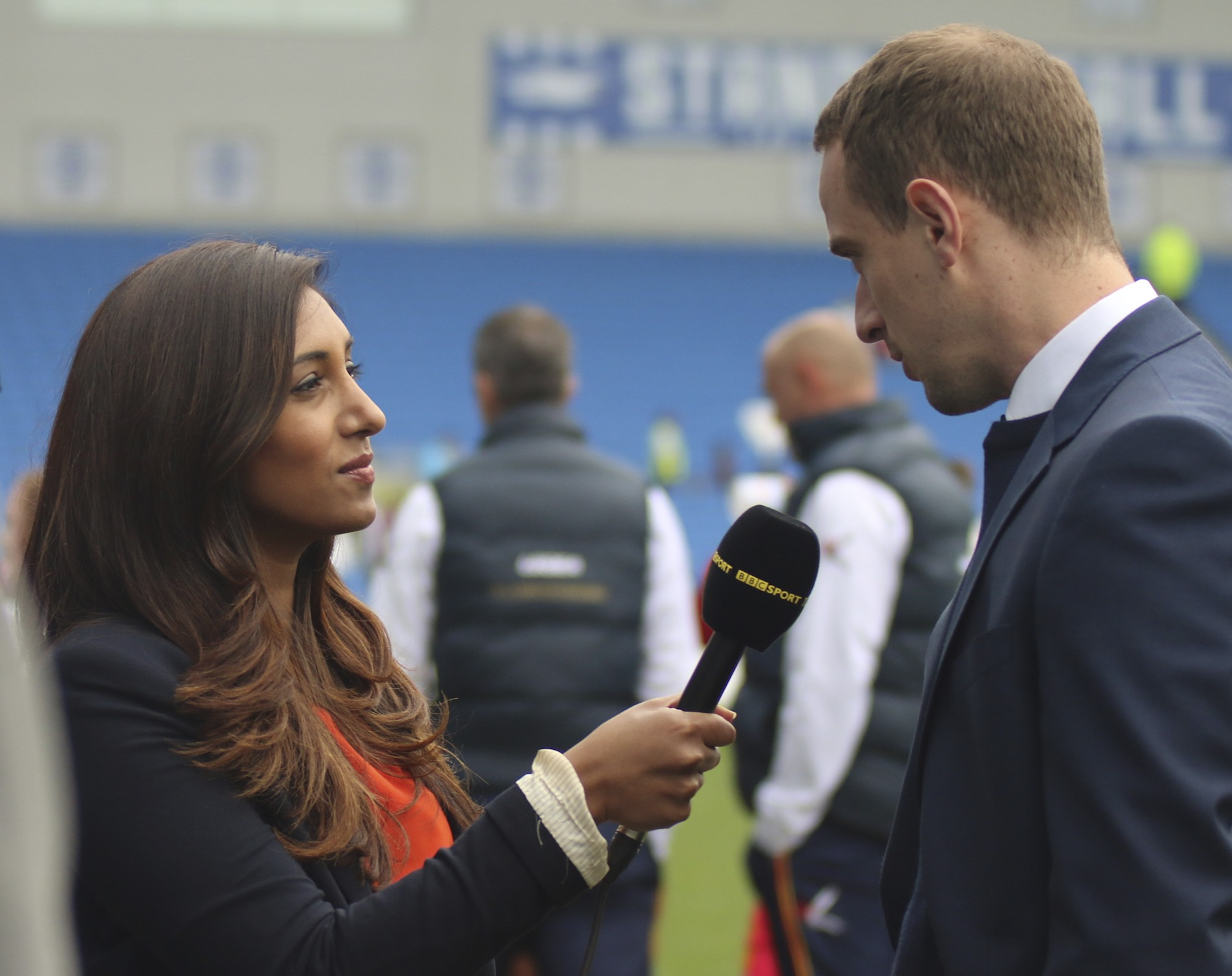
- Daheley interviews former England women's national football team coach Mark Sampson in 2014
- Born: 1980 or 1981 (age 45–46); London, England
- Education: Brunel University
- Occupations: Journalist, newsreader and presenter
- Years active: 2007–present
- Employer: BBC
- Notable work: BBC News Summary; BBC Radio 2 (2019–present); BBC Breakfast; BBC Weekend News; BBC Radio 1 (2010–2018); BBC News at Six; BBC News at Ten; Victoria Derbyshire
- Partner: Kane William-Smith
- Children: 1

Tina Daheley (born 1980 or 1981) is an English journalist, newsreader and presenter who works for the BBC, both on television and radio. She read the breakfast news bulletins for BBC Radio 1Xtra and on Radio 1 and Radio 2's breakfast shows. In addition, she is the regular relief presenter of the Jeremy Vine programme on BBC Radio 2.

Daheley is also a relief presenter on the BBC News at Ten and BBC News at Six. In 2018, she became the narrator (and later the regular presenter) of Points of View.

== Career ==
Daheley began working behind the scenes in television production and worked on Space Cadets in an early production role.

Daheley joined the BBC in 2007. She has presented television coverage of women's football and co-presented the BBC Three political discussion show Free Speech, alongside Rick Edwards.

Daheley has also presented the 60 Seconds news on BBC Three, E24 on the News Channel and Revealed (BBC Two's Switch Zone). She is the former host of the 1Xtra news show, the flagship news programme for BBC Radio 1Xtra. She was the sports newsreader on BBC Radio 1's The Chris Moyles Show from February 2010 until the show ended in September 2012. She went on to host the news, sport, and weather bulletins for The Radio 1 Breakfast Show with Nick Grimshaw from 24 September 2012, until she left Radio 1 on 10 August 2018.

Since July 2016, Daheley has been a relief presenter on BBC Breakfast and Victoria Derbyshire. In September 2016, Daheley became one of the main presenters of Crimewatch, alongside Jeremy Vine.

On 29 May 2018, Daheley made her debut on the BBC News at Six and on 8 July 2018, Daheley made her debut on the BBC Weekend News and the BBC News at Ten, anchoring the corporation's flagship evening news programme for the first time.

In July 2018, the BBC published updated salaries of its best-paid presenters, and Daheley was included in the list for the first time. The corporation named on-air presenters earning more than £150,000 in 2017–18. Daheley was listed as earning between £150,000–£159,999 during that year.

In January 2019, Daheley joined BBC Radio 2 to become the newsreader on The Radio 2 Breakfast Show when Zoe Ball took over as presenter from Chris Evans. She also became part of the BBC Election Night team, reading the top of the hour five minute BBC News Summary. In June 2024, it was confirmed that Daheley would be part of the new presenting team on the BBC News At One, alongside Anna Foster, Ben Brown, Nina Warhurst, Sally Nugent, Jon Kay and Reeta Chakrabarti, rotating in Salford – with a one-hour long programme.

In June 2026, after 18 years of presenting the news on BBC Radio breakfast shows, across Radio 1 and Radio 2, Daheley announced she would be leaving the Radio 2 breakfast show; her final stint reading the bulletins was on 3 July 2026.

== Personal life ==
Daheley was born in 1980 or 1981. She comes from a Sikh, Punjabi, working-class family and was brought up on a council estate in Perivale, West London. She has an older sister and a younger brother. She was educated at The Ellen Wilkinson School for Girls in Ealing. She studied computer science at Brunel University and went on to complete a Master's degree in journalism at the University of Leeds.

Daheley met her partner Kane William-Smith on holiday in Ibiza in 2012. The couple got engaged on 7 January 2018. On 7 December 2020, she announced that she was expecting her first child. On 26 April 2021, she announced that she gave birth to a daughter.
