= Revealed (British TV programme) =

UK news program

Revealed... is a TV programme that was the BBC's dedicated news programme for teenagers, part of BBC Switch, the show broadcast on Saturdays on BBC2. It was presented by Charlotte Ashton, Anthony Baxter, Adina Campbell, and Tina Daheley.

== Programme history ==
The programme first aired on 17 May 2008, and was called Revealed... Why do they hate you? It looked at attitudes towards British teens in the press. In October 2008 the team produced a special two part programme looking into the spate of suicides in the South Wales borough of Bridgend. Other programmes include Revealed...Manorexia, Missing People, How to beat spots, and How worried should you be about knife crime.

Other shows have looked at male eating disorders, Bridgend suicides, young millionaires and mobile phone addiction.

In May 2010, spin off show Revealed Extra launched, presented by Anthony Baxter. It looked at hard-hitting subjects such as teenage gangs, joining the army at 16, and young people who use their body to make money.

Both series ran until the end of BBC Switch in December 2010.

== Online ==
Revealed… also made weekly online videos for the BBC Switch website. Interviews include Ladyhawke, Lady Gaga, John Terry and Tom Daley, as well as regular news stories for teenagers.

== Production ==
The production team were based at Grafton House, home to the 5:19 show, and BBC Switch. Revealed... was produced by Amy Hollis, Toby Sealey and Jay Husbands; Revealed Extra was Produced and Directed by James Taylor. The Executive Producers are Geoffrey Goodwin and Rod McKenzie.

== Presenters ==
- Charlotte Ashton – Ashton moved to Switch from Radio 4; she has also worked as a newspaper journalist
- Anthony Baxter – before presenting Revealed… Baxter worked as a radio reporter and producer for the BBC, and for the Children's programmes, Newsround and Sportsround; he went on to work as a journalist and presenter for Radio 1's Newsbeat.
- Adina Campbell – went on to present the BBC regional news programme South Today
- Tina Daheley – went on to present the news and sport during The Radio 1 Breakfast Show
