= Anthony S. Baxter =

British television presenter

- Born: 1 May 1982 (age 43); Rochdale, England
- Occupation: Journalist

Anthony Stuart Baxter (born 1 May 1982) is a British journalist and broadcaster from Rochdale.

He started his career in local radio for the BBC, before presenting for BBC Switch and a reporter for Radio 1's Newsbeat. He now presents news for London Live, the capital's dedicated TV channel.

He lives in London.

== Education ==
Baxter studied English and linguistics at Lancaster University, before completing a master's degree in broadcast journalism at UCLan.

== Journalism career ==
Baxter started his career with the BBC and was a reporter for BBC Radio 1's Newsbeat programme. During this time he also presented the show on occasion.

In 2008, he joined "BBC Switch" to present the news documentary series Revealed... on BBC Two alongside Charlotte Ashton, Adina Campbell and Tina Daheley. He also fronted the spin-off series Revealed Extra.

He fronted the annual BBC News School Report radio and television shows between 2009 and 2013.

He also appeared on the BBC Radio 1 surgery debate shows on Sunday nights with Aled Haydn-Jones, Max Akhtar, and Charlotte Ashton.

In 2014, Baxter joined London Live, the capital's television station which launched on 31 March 2014. He presented "The Big Question" on the nightly news show Not the One Show. In November 2014 he moved to present The Evening News and co-present The Evening Show for the channel. He is currently a main news presenter across the channel, also fronting London Live Debates and The Headline Interview.
