= Miranda Chartrand and Adam Nichols =

Miranda Chartrand
- Born: 3 May 1990 (age 35); Guelph, Ontario, Canada
- Origin: Stroud, Gloucestershire
- Genres: Pop, indie
- Occupation: Singer
- Instrument: Vocals
- Years active: 2009–present
- Labels: Swinging Mantis

Adam Nichols
- Born: 10 September 1991 (age 34)
- Origin: Essex, United Kingdom
- Genres: Pop, indie
- Occupation: Singer
- Instrument(s): Vocals, acoustic guitar
- Years active: 2009–present
- Labels: Swinging Mantis

Miranda Chartrand (born 3 May 1990) and Adam Nichols (born 10 September 1991) are a musical duo. They met and began working together through the BBC television series Chartjackers, which was challenging the online community to write, record and release a pop song through crowdsourcing in ten weeks. After initially auditioning through separate YouTube videos, Chartrand and Nichols then successfully auditioned in person to provide vocals on the single. They recorded the song, entitled "I've Got Nothing", at the University of Wales in Newport, South Wales on 7 October 2009. The single was given a worldwide release on 9 November through the iTunes Store, and went on to peak at number 36 on the UK Singles Chart.

== Lives and career ==
=== 1990–2008: Early lives ===
Chartrand was born on 3 May 1990, and was raised in Guelph, Ontario. She studied at the John F. Ross Collegiate Vocational Institute, where she played on the open girls' rugby team until 2009. At the age of 16, Chartrand registered the channel mydogmaddie on the video-sharing website YouTube on 25 June 2006. She worked as a camp counselor at Camp Manitou in 2009 and 2010 and has also worked in Toronto. In 2009, Chartrand moved to Stroud, Gloucestershire, to work as an au pair.

Nichols was born on 10 September 1991. Originally from Essex, he went to Mayflower High School and then studied music at the Brighton Institute of Modern Music. Nichols registered the YouTube account FireYourEngine on 11 April 2009, at the age of 17. He has built up a fan base of 2,000 subscribers and still uploads original songs on a regular basis.

=== 2009–present: Chartjackers and beyond ===
Chartjackers is a cross-platform documentary series that was broadcast on BBC Two during 2009. It documented an attempt to write, record and release a number one single through crowdsourcing and was looking for vocalists to sing on their forthcoming single, "I've Got Nothing". Chartrand and Nichols each submitted a video audition on their respective mydogmaddie and FireYourEngine YouTube channels. They were each chosen as one of ten finalists, and were offered the chance to audition in person in Rochdale. Their respective auditions were successful, and they were selected to duet on the official release.

"I've Got Nothing"
Chartrand and Nichols provided the vocals for "I've Got Nothing" in 2009.

Chartrand and Nichols recorded "I've Got Nothing" on 7 October 2009 at the University of Wales in Newport, South Wales. They also featured prominently in the single's official music video, which was shown nationwide on music channels such as 4Music and Viva. On 4 November, Chartrand and Nichols performed "I've Got Nothing" at a gig at 93 Feet East in London, which was headlined by former pop star Chesney Hawkes. "I've Got Nothing" was officially released worldwide exclusively through the iTunes Store at midnight on 9 November 2009 by independent record label Swinging Mantis – the single peaked at number 36 on the UK Singles Chart. Chartrand quit her job as an au pair to become more involved with the Chartjackers project, then moved to London shortly afterwards, where she and Nichols briefly lived together. Later that year, Chartrand and Nichols covered "Vienna" by Billy Joel, which Chartrand described as being "one of [her] all time favourite songs".

Chartrand currently resides in Toronto, Ontario.

== Discography ==
=== Singles ===
Year	Title	Chart peak positions		Album
Year	Title	UK	UK indie	Album
2009	"I've Got Nothing" (as part of Chartjackers)	36	1	Single release only
