= Charlotte Ashton =

British television presenter

- Born: Birmingham, United Kingdom
- Occupation: Television presenter

Charlotte Ashton is a British television presenter. She presented Revealed... on BBC Switch alongside Anthony Baxter.

== Career ==
Ashton started her career at BBC Radio 4 and has written for The Guardian newspaper.

=== Radio 1's Surgery with Kelly Osbourne ===
On Sunday 30 November 2008, Ashton hosted Radio 1's first surgery debate show with presenter Aled Haydn-Jones. The second debate show was on Sunday 18 January 2009, which Ashton hosted with Haydn-Jones and fellow Revealed... presenter Anthony Baxter.

== Personal life ==
Ashton was born in Birmingham and now lives in London.
