= The Cut (British TV series) =

British television series

- Genre: Teen drama
- Created by: Geoffrey Goodwin and Al Smith
- Written by: Al Smith; Anna McCleery; Grant Black; Vicki Lutas; Isla Gray; Emma Smithwick
- Directed by: Sarah Walker and Laura Smith
- Starring: Scarlett Bowman; Jessica Dickens; Lara Goodison; Edward Green; Matt Kane; Dermot Martin; Billie North; Tilly Wood; Maisie Crossland; Deborah May; Alex Roe; Connor Scarlett; Wilfred Taylor; Stephanie Blacker; Tosin Cole; Kellie-Rose Demmel; Stephen Hagan; Luke Newton; Dominic Sherwood; Samuell Benta; Duane Henry; Alice Southwood; Thomas Williamson
- Country of origin: United Kingdom
- No. of series: 3
- No. of episodes: 40

Production
- Executive producer: Geoffrey Goodwin
- Producers: Pete Gibbons and Geoffrey Goodwin
- Running time: 25 minutes

Original release
- Network: BBC Two
- Release: 19 September 2009 – 18 December 2010

The Cut is a BBC television teen drama, first broadcast in September 2009. The series was developed by Geoffrey Goodwin and Holby City writer, Al Smith in collaboration with KateModern producer Pete Gibbons and Hollyoaks director, Sarah Walker. The Cut is broadcast in 25-minute episodes on BBC Two, with each episode being broadcast in daily five-minute chunks on the website throughout the week before. The BBC describe it as reflecting the way many young people want to consume content which a critic has more cynically interpreted as for those with even the shortest of attention spans.

The first series was broadcast from September to December 2009. The second series was broadcast from April through to August 2010, and the third series started two months later, and ran from October to December 2010. In March 2011, it was officially announced that The Cut had been cancelled and would not return for a fourth series.

== Series ==
A second season and open auditions for two parts were announced in February 2010. The second series started filming in mid-March 2010 and airing started on 24 April, with the website airing it in five-minute chunks through the previous week.

On 8 July 2010, it was announced on the blog that a third series has been commissioned.

The Cut website release each episode of the show in daily five-minute chunks throughout the previous week, showing the whole of the upcoming episode before it airs.

On 19 February 2011, The Cut announced on their Facebook page that there is 'a lot of work going on behind the scenes for a fourth series and a DVD release, although a DVD has not been officially confirmed and a fourth series will not be going ahead.

The Cut is distributed in the US through Hulu.

== Episodes ==
=== Series 1 ===
A stranger's death draws 18-year-old Jay to London where he meets the Mackinnons and the Loxleys, two families with an age-old history of bad blood. Posh girl Marla Mackinnon falls for Jay, but Mack, her controlling dad, does not stand for it. Olive Loxley is dreaming of escape from her overprotective sister, Toni and their family café, but is troubled Stephen Mackinnon really her way out?

=== Series 2 ===
It is a new term at Deaconsfield and a chance for new beginnings for faces both old and new. But it is unclear whether Olive is ready to move on from Stephen, whether Marla is over Jay, or what Amy Mackinnion is up to.

=== Series 3 ===
Series Three began with cast departures and new character introductions, following Olive's exit from The Cut.

== Soundtrack ==
The theme song for The Cut is "U + Me=" by Dan Black. The programme also includes tracks by The xx, Death Cab for Cutie, The Clash, Missy Higgins, Ayo, Yeah Yeah Yeahs, Blu Cantrell, Thirteen Senses, Metro Station, The Veronicas, Kings of Leon, Lady Gaga, Catherine Feeny, Tegan and Sara, Radiohead, Goldfrapp, Regina Spektor, MGMT, and Me and My Sister.

== International broadcasts ==
It has been announced that all the series so far will be aired in Portugal, Poland, Spain, Japan, Latin America and Greece, and there are possibilities of airings in at least four more countries. It is unknown exactly when they will be broadcast in these countries. In Latin America, the cable channel Sony Spin announced via its Facebook page that the series premiered soon, but it is not known whether it will be through their website or on TV. The episodes have been uploaded to the website ANT1 WEB TV PLUS in Greece from ANT1 TV from 2 May 2011.

The series has been on air in Italy on La3 since June 4, 2013.
