= I've Got Nothing =

Single by Chartjackers
- Released: 9 November 2009 (worldwide)
- Recorded: 7 October 2009; University of Wales, Newport
- Genre: Pop
- Length: 2:50
- Label: Swinging Mantis
- Producer(s): Marc Dowding

"I've Got Nothing" is a song released by the participants of the BBC Two documentary series Chartjackers and is credited as such. The track was produced by university student Marc Dowding and its music video was filmed by YouTube user Charlotte McDonnell (formerly Charlie McDonnell). It was released by the record label Swinging Mantis on 9 November 2009 exclusively through the iTunes Store. The single and its release were the end product of a ten-week campaign documented on Chartjackers, which challenged the global online community to write, record and release a pop song that would make number one on the UK Singles Chart. The song was written entirely through crowdsourcing, with its every aspect, such as the title, lyrics, melody and singers, having been solicited from YouTube users.

"I've Got Nothing" was a charity single released to benefit the UK charity Children in Need. It was sung by vocalists Miranda Chartrand and Adam Nichols, both on the record and at live performances. Its music video featured shots of Chartrand and Nichols singing in a London park with Children in Need mascot Pudsey Bear, as well as video clips submitted by Chartjackers viewers of themselves miming to the track. The song went on to sell a total of 20,000 copies worldwide and earned a chart position of Number 36 in the UK Singles Chart.

== Background and writing ==
"I've Got Nothing" was written in ten weeks entirely through crowdsourcing as part of a project that was documented on the BBC Two series Chartjackers. Members of the online community were asked to submit various song ideas on the YouTube channel "ChartJackersProject", with the aim that a single could be written, recorded and then released on 9 November 2009.

The lyrics for "I've Got Nothing" were written on the week of 8 September. A video posted to the YouTube channel "ChartJackersProject" invited viewers to submit possible lines as comments. Viewers posted more than 4,000 comments, from which the song's lyrics were selected. The following week, another video was uploaded to "ChartJackersProject" that published the winning lyrics and announced that the song's title was to be "I've Got Nothing"—the song's chorus had been written by YouTube user "blakeisno1". The video also invited viewers to compose a melody for the completed lyrics. Viewers submitted 51 melodies as video responses, with the entry from Jonny Dark, a 19-year-old musician from London, being selected as the winner.

A new YouTube video was uploaded to "ChartJackersProject" on 25 September, offering viewers the opportunity to audition to sing "I've Got Nothing" on the final release. Hundred of viewers auditioned, with ten being selected to go through as finalists. These ten finalists auditioned in person at the Wellfield Working Men's Club in Rochdale, where Miranda Chartrand, a 19-year-old au pair from Stroud, Gloucestershire, and Adam Nichols, an 18-year-old musician from Essex, were chosen to perform "I've Got Nothing" on the single.

== Recording and release ==
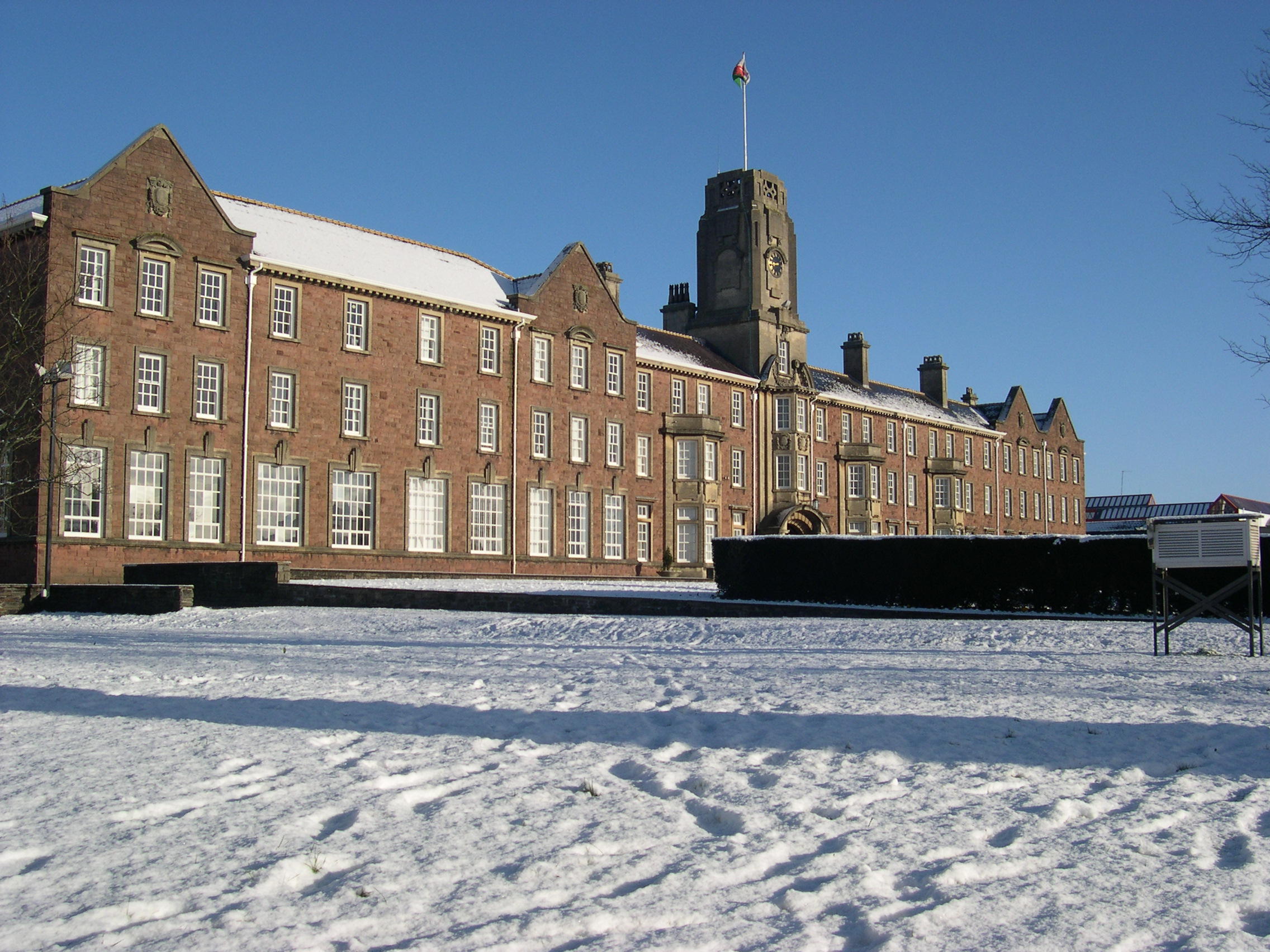
"I've Got Nothing" was recorded at the University of Wales, Newport.

"I've Got Nothing" was produced and co-written by university student Marc Dowding. Dowding learnt about the opportunity through a video posted to the YouTube channel "ChartJackersProject" and was offered the job after e-mailing his CV to a BBC Switch producer. Chartrand and Nichols travelled to Newport, South Wales on 7 October to record the single at the recording studio of the University of Wales, Newport. On producing the single, Dowding remarked: "It was a great help to be able to use the recording studios at the University."

"I've Got Nothing" was leaked to the internet during October 2009, before being officially released a month later by record label Swinging Mantis. As Swinging Mantis was a small record label, the budget for "I've Got Nothing" was limited, so a physical version of the single was never made available. Instead, the track was made sold exclusively as an iTunes digital download. "I've Got Nothing" was released worldwide through the iTunes Store at midnight on 9 November. Each copy was sold for £0.79 in the United Kingdom and $0.99 in the United States.

== Reception ==
=== Critical response ===
"I've Got Nothing"
"I've Got Nothing" featured sound clips of Chartjackers viewers singing and clapping along with the track.

"I've Got Nothing" was largely ignored by the mainstream media and did not receive many reviews—the reviews that it did receive from critics were generally negative. British music website Popjustice called the effort "very bad", and Ellie Halfacre of Tower Review explained that "some commented that the melody was bad, and others said it was the lyrics". Halfacre also questioned whether the project was about self-promotion or charity. David Balls of Digital Spy gave the single three stars out of five, predicting that it was "unlikely to make much of a top 40 impact". James Masterton of Yahoo! Music felt that the song had "fallen a long way short of" the goal of reaching number one because it had not been able to "guarantee mass public support". Record producer Mike Stock said that the song had "no killer melody" and singer VV Brown suggested that "the lyrics could be better".

=== Commercial performance ===
Expectations for the release of "I've Got Nothing" were high. The main goal of Chartjackers had been for the song to reach number one on the UK Singles Chart, with the synopsis of the first episode expecting it to "sell an estimated 25,000 singles". The single sold almost 20,000 copies worldwide and raised £10,000 for the charity Children in Need. Just under 8,400 copies were downloaded in the UK, which gave "I've Got Nothing" a chart placing of Number 36 in the UK Singles Chart. The following week the single fell out of the UK Top 100.

== Music video ==
Chartrand (left) and Nichols with Children in Need mascot Pudsey Bear in the music video for "I've Got Nothing".

The music video for "I've Got Nothing" was edited by YouTube user Charlotte McDonnell. It shows various "ChartJackersProject" viewers miming to the song, interspersed with shots of Chartrand and Nichols singing "I've Got Nothing" in a park. The video was created through crowdsourcing, in a manner similar to the writing of the song itself. On 8 October 2009, viewers were invited via "ChartJackersProject" to film and submit video clips of themselves either singing or clapping along with the track. Shots of Chartrand and Nichols with an actor dressed as Children in Need mascot Pudsey Bear were filmed in a park. This footage was compiled with some of the clips submitted by viewers and used to construct the final music video, which was shown nationwide on British music channels such as 4Music and Viva.

Many viewers submitted clips that were literal interpretations of the lyrics. For example, some viewers held up medals and trophies for the lyric "won the greatest prize", others zoomed-in on their own eye during the line "look into my eyes" and others turned off lights for the lyric "the lights are going out". Most of the shots of Chartrand and Nichols are of them singing "I've Got Nothing" in a park with an actor dressed as Pudsey Bear, but the video also features shots of them eating ice cream, swinging around a lamp post and dancing in front of a tree. The video begins with shots of the duo throwing a football back and forth to each other. At 2:03, the video splits into 35 equally sized smaller rectangles, each containing a clip of a "ChartJackersProject" viewer clapping in time with "I've Got Nothing". Over the next 18 seconds of the song, 11 different sets of 35 viewers (i.e. approximately 385 viewers in total) are shown clapping along with the song. The video also features a cameo from YouTube user Peter Oakley at 0:06.

== Live performances ==
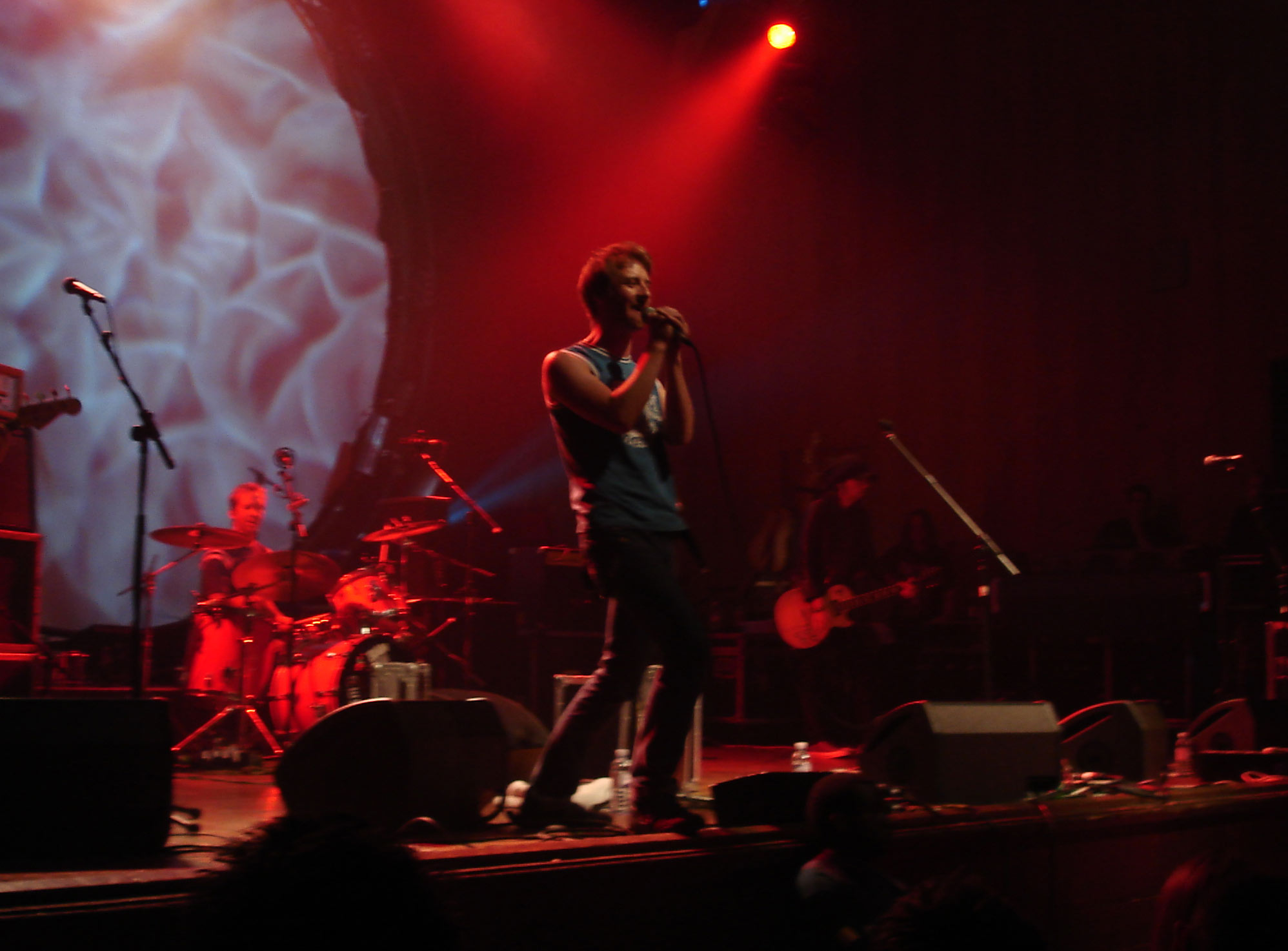
Singer Chesney Hawkes headlined a gig where "I've Got Nothing" was performed.

"I've Got Nothing" was first performed live by Chartrand and Nichols on 4 November 2009 at 93 Feet East in London. Their performance was shown during the ninth episode of Chartjackers. The gig also featured performances from other YouTube users and was headlined by former pop star Chesney Hawkes. The song was performed live for a second time four days later at Switch Live 2009, an awards show organised by BBC Switch at the Hammersmith Apollo—the event was opened by a performance of "I've Got Nothing".

== Track listing ==
Digital download
No.	Title	Length
1.	"I've Got Nothing"	2:50

== Charts ==
Chart (2009)	Peak position
UK Singles (OCC)	36
UK Indie (OCC)	1

== Credits and personnel ==
- Miranda Chartrand – vocals
- Adam Nichols – vocals
- Jonny Dark – writer (melody)
- Marc Dowding – writer, producer, engineer and mixer

== See also ==
- 2009 in British music
