= Slink =

Defunct British online magazine for teenage girls

Slink was an online magazine published by the BBC for teenage girls. The health articles on the site were written by Dr Mel, a regular contributor to BBC Radio 1's The Sunday Surgery and Top of the Pops magazine. Slink was created by members of BBC Switch. On 15 May 2011, the Slink website was closed.
