= BBC Switch =

Brand for BBC content aimed at UK teenagers

- Industry: Media
- Genre: Youth
- Founded: 20 October 2007; 18 years ago
- Defunct: 18 December 2010; 15 years ago
- Area served: United Kingdom
- Services: Programming block on BBC Two and BBC Radio 1 Online portal
- Owner: BBC
- Website: www.bbc.co.uk/switch

BBC Switch was the brand for BBC content aimed at UK teenagers. The brand was launched on Saturday 20 October 2007 on BBC Two and ceased broadcasting on 18 December 2010. It included a block of television programmes on BBC Two, an online portal and programming on the BBC's youth radio station, BBC Radio 1. It was BBC Two's second programming block aimed at teenagers, following on from DEF II.

== Content ==
=== Television ===
Four programmes were originally shown as part of BBC Switch on Saturday afternoons on BBC Two. Sound was a weekly music entertainment and chat show presented by Annie Mac and Nick Grimshaw. Falcon Beach was an imported Canadian coming-of-age drama about teenagers, their passions, relationships, friends, families and enemies. Them was a documentary series that explored the different teenage "tribes" that exist in Britain today. The Surgery, presented by Jeff Leach, was a chat show for BBC Switch, which effectively replaced The Sunday Surgery presented by Kelly Osbourne, aimed to help teenagers with everyday problems.

On 17 May 2008, three new shows were launched under the BBC Switch brand: Kyle XY, a sci-fi drama, Class of 2008, a documentary series which followed six friends in London, and Revealed..., a new journalism show which looked at the lives of teenagers in the UK, presented by Charlotte Ashton and Anthony Baxter. The ABC Family show Greek was also shown.

From 2008, continuity links for BBC Switch on BBC Two were presented by Tom Deacon and AJ Odudu, either at an outdoor location in various parts of the UK or indoors in The 5:19 Show studio. Previously they were presented by "Flash Louis".

The 5:19 Show also had a slot on Saturday afternoons, a show that was focussed around a celebrity interview with a game that often used a pun on the celebrity name. This was also presented by Deacon and Odudu. (The 5:19 Show was also used for the interstitials.) Deacon also hosted a 5:19 Show as part of the Sunday night Switch broadcast on Radio 1.

=== Radio ===
BBC Radio 1 devoted Sunday evenings to BBC Switch from 7pm to 9pm when The Surgery with Aled started, and then at 10pm, Annie and Nick, who previously appeared from 7 to 10pm, were on until midnight.

"Switch" was unique in that younger viewers' contributions were also broadcast. Some were involved in pre- and post-production roles.

=== Online ===
BBC Switch online was a website portal linking teenagers to content across the BBC including BBC Radio 1, BBC Radio 1Xtra, BBC Blast and EastEnders. The Switch brand also included Slink, an online magazine for teenage girls.

Mac said, "I'm really honoured and excited to be involved with BBC Switch on Sunday nights. The show is going to be like nothing heard on radio before. It's a proper challenge for me and something I can't wait to get stuck in to. As for Sound, I'm really looking forward to working with Grimmy [Nick Grimshaw] and the opportunity to showcase new and upcoming bands on TV is truly exciting for me, it's so important that music gets this kind of TV exposure."

The 5:19 Show was also part of BBC Switch. It was hosted by Deacon, Odudu and Jimmy Hill online from Monday to Friday at 5:19pm. The show was named 5:19 in recognition of the time most teenagers log-on.

== Live events ==
The first BBC Switch Live was held on 12 October 2008 at the Hammersmith Apollo. It had performances by Fall Out Boy, Ne-Yo, Miley Cyrus, McFly, Basshunter and N-Dubz, with a special guest performance by George Sampson. The event, hosted by Mac, Grimshaw, Osbourne and Deacon, was strictly for 14- to 17-year-olds.

The second event was held on 8 November 2009, at the same venue. Aled Haydn Jones, Kimberly Walsh, Mac and Grimshaw hosted, with many acts playing, including The Saturdays, JLS, N-Dubz, The Black Eyed Peas, Shaheen Jafargholi, Alexandra Burke and Pixie Lott. Many of the performances were made available for viewing on the BBC Switch website. The awards were designed and produced by the UK trophy manufacturer Gaudio Awards.

The event would return in 2010 as BBC Radio 1's Teen Awards.

== Temporary mall and head office closure ==
Director general Mark Thompson's strategic review of the corporation's scope and activities included proposals to close BBC Switch and BBC Blast, which were aimed at teenagers. In February 2010, The Guardian and The Times newspapers both reported that the BBC Switch website was under threat of closure, in a review of the BBC's online presence.

In July 2010, the BBC Trust published an interim announcement which confirmed that it would support Thompson's proposal to close both, effectively signalling their closure.

The following day, BBC Switch ended after three years. It was announced that the closure was due to a 25% cut in the BBC Online budget, reducing it by £34 million. Any possibility that the site would return was removed in January 2011.
