= Timeline of breakfast radio programmes in the UK =

This is a timeline of the history of the broadcasting of breakfast radio programmes on national stations in the United Kingdom.

== 1950s and 1960s ==
- 1957
  - 28 October – The Today programme launches on the BBC Home Service as a programme of "topical talks" to give listeners an alternative to listening to light music which the Home Service had previously broadcast at breakfast.
- 1958 to 1964
  - No events.
- 1965
  - 25 October – Breakfast Special is broadcast for the first time on the BBC Light Programme. The programme replaces Morning Music.
- 1966
  - No events.
- 1967
  - 30 September – Tony Blackburn launches BBC Radio 1 when he starts presenting the first edition of its breakfast show. 90 minutes earlier, BBC Radio 2 had also gone on air for the first time, its breakfast show was the continuation of Breakfast Special, presented by Paul Hollingdale.
- 1968
  - January – Tony Blackburn stops presenting the BBC Radio 1 breakfast show on Saturdays. Rather than replace him, BBC Radio 1 simulcasts the entirety of Breakfast Special.
- 1969
  - No events.

== 1970s ==
- 1970
  - 5 January – John Dunn becomes the permanent presenter of BBC Radio 2's Breakfast Special.
  - 6 April – The first Thought for the Day is broadcast on the Today programme, replacing Ten to Eight.
- 1971
  - No events.
- 1972
  - 3 April – Terry Wogan replaces John Dunn as the presenter for BBC Radio 2's breakfast show. As a result, the Breakfast Special name disappears from the airwaves after seven years.
- 1973
  - 1 June – Tony Blackburn presents his final daily breakfast show on BBC Radio 1, having fronted it since the station went on air in 1967.
  - 4 June – Noel Edmonds takes over as presenter of BBC Radio 1's breakfast show.
- 1974
  - No events.
- 1975
  - No events.
- 1976
  - No events.
- 1977
  - 2 May – BBC Radio 4 launches a new breakfast programme Up to the Hour. Consequently, The Today programme is reduced from a continuous two-hour programme to two 25-minute slots.
- 1978
  - 28 April – Noel Edmonds presents the BBC Radio 1 breakfast show for the final time.
  - 2 May – Dave Lee Travis takes over as presenter of the BBC Radio 1 breakfast show.
  - 3 July – Changes are made to BBC Radio 4's weekday breakfast schedule. After just over a year on air, Up to the Hour is cancelled. Consequently, The Today programme once again becomes a continuous two-hour programme. Also, a new weekday 6am News Briefing is introduced.
- 1979
  - No events.

== 1980s ==
- 1980
  - No events.
- 1981
  - 2 January – Dave Lee Travis steps down from presenting the BBC Radio 1 breakfast show.
  - 5 January – Mike Read succeeds Dave Lee Travis as presenter of the BBC Radio 1 breakfast show.
- 1982
  - 6 March – BBC Radio 1's weekend breakafst show is renamed as Tony Blackburn's Saturday/Sunday Show, with Toni Arthur (who would leave in June), Maggie Philbin and Keith Chegwin joining Tony Blackburn as co-presenters.
- 1983
  - No events.
- 1984
  - 29 September – BBC Radio 1's weekend breakfast show is revamped with Peter Powell replacing Tony Blackburn as the presenter. The children's requests element of the show is dropped.
  - 28 December – Terry Wogan ends his first run as presenter of The Radio 2 Breakfast Show as he leaves the station for a while. He would return in January 1993.
- 1985
  - 7 January – Ken Bruce takes over the BBC Radio 2 breakfast show.
- 1986
  - 7 April – Derek Jameson takes over the BBC Radio 2 breakfast show from Ken Bruce.
  - 18 April – After five years, Mike Read presents his final breakfast show on BBC Radio 1. Adrian John then hosts the show for the following two weeks.
  - 5 May – After standing in for Mike Read during the previous Summer, Mike Smith takes over the BBC Radio 1 breakfast show.
  - 24 December – John Timpson presents the Today programme the final time.
- 1987
  - 3 January – The Today programme is extended to six days a week when it launches a Saturday edition and John Humphrys joins the programme's presenting team as John Timpson's replacement.
- 1988
  - 23 May – Simon Mayo takes over as presenter of Radio 1's breakfast show, replacing Mike Smith. The new programme takes on a zoo format by introducing co-hosts and new features.
  - 1 October – Mark Goodier and Liz Kershaw take over as presenters of Radio 1's weekend breakfast show.
- 1989
  - 1 April – Bruno Brookes replaces Mark Goodier as Liz Kershaw's co-host of the Radio 1's weekend breakfast show.

== 1990s ==
- 1990
  - 28 August – The first edition of BBC Radio 5's weekday breakfast programme Morning Edition is broadcast. It is presented by Sarah Ward and Jon Briggs and airs six days a week between 6:30am and 9am. On Sundays, the programme is called Sunday Edition. It is presented by Barry Johnston and comes on air an hour later, at 7:30am.
- 1991
  - 1 May – The launch of 24-hour broadcasting on BBC Radio 1 sees the Simon Mayo Breakfast Show starting and finishing 30 minutes earlier and airing between 6am and 9am.
  - 20 December – Derek Jameson leaves the BBC Radio 2 breakfast show, after presenting it for five years.
- 1992
  - 6 January – Brian Hayes takes over as host of the BBC Radio 2 breakfast show. He presents the show for the duration of the year, ending his run on 23 December.
  - 9 February – The final edition of Bruno Brookes' and Liz Kershaw's BBC Radio 1's weekend breakfast show is broadcast. Johnnie Walker then hosts the show in the interim.
  - 17 February – Danny Baker replaces Sarah Ward and Jon Briggs as presenter of the BBC Radio 5 weekday breakfast programme Morning Edition.
  - 14 March – Gary Davies becomes the host of Radio 1's weekend breakfast show.
  - 13 July – In a bid to counteract the forthcoming launch of Classic FM, BBC Radio 3 makes major changes to its programmes, including the launch of a new weekday breakfast programme called On Air, which replaces Morning Concert on weekdays.
  - 7 September – Classic FM launches with breakfast show presenter Nick Bailey opening the station at 6am.
- 1993
  - 4 January – Terry Wogan returns to BBC Radio 2 with Wake Up to Wogan.
  - July – Jonathan Coleman becomes Russ Williams's co-host on the recently launched Virgin 1215's weekday breakfast show.
  - 3 September – After five years, Simon Mayo leaves the BBC Radio 1 breakfast show.
  - 6 September – Mark Goodier takes over as presenter of the BBC Radio 1 breakfast show and hosts it until the end of the year.
  - November – Michele Stevens replaces Danny Baker as the presenter of Morning Edition on BBC Radio 5.
- 1994
  - 1 January – Kevin Greening takes over the BBC Radio 1 weekend breakfast show from Gary Davies.
  - 10 January – Steve Wright becomes BBC Radio 1's latest breakfast show presenter.
  - 27 November – Clive Warren takes over the weekend breakfast show from Kevin Greening.
- 1995
  - 24 April – Chris Evans takes over BBC Radio 1's breakfast show.
  - 9 October – BBC Radio 3 begins broadcasting an hour earlier on weekdays at 6am, when breakfast show On Air is extended from two to three hours.
  - 21 October – Kevin Greening returns to BBC Radio 1's weekend breakfast show, replacing Clive Warren.
- 1996
  - 18 March – Mike Read replaces Nick Bailey as host of Classic FM's breakfast show.
- 1997
  - 31 January – Chris Evans leaves the BBC Radio 1 breakfast show, after he was dismissed for demanding Fridays off to work on his Channel 4 show TFI Friday. As a result, Simon Mayo temporarily returns to the show as its interim host.
  - 17 February – Mark and Lard become the BBC Radio 1 breakfast show's new presenters.
  - 3 May – Brian Hayes replaces Julian Worricker as BBC Radio 5 Live's weekend breakfast presenter.
  - 13 October – Zoe Ball and Kevin Greening replace Mark and Lard as hosts of the BBC Radio 1's breakfast show.
    - Chris Evans takes over the Virgin Radio breakfast show from Russ Williams.
- 1998
  - 29 March – BBC Radio 3's Sunday breakfast programme Sacred and Profane is broadcast for the final time.
  - 4 April – BBC Radio 3's Breakfast programme On Air extends to weekends.
  - 6 April – As part of an earlier start to BBC Radio 4's day, the weekday editions of the Today programme are extended by 30 minutes to three hours.
  - 7 September – Peter Allen and Jane Garvey take over as presenters of 5 Live Drive which replaces Nationwide as the station's teatime programme. They swap with Julian Worricker who takes over the breakfast programme.
  - 25 September – Kevin Greening leaves BBC Radio 1's weekday breakfast show, leaving Zoe Ball as its sole presenter as he moves back to weekends to replace Clive Warren as host of the Sunday weekend breakfast show.
  - 5 October – Virgin Radio starts simulcasts of the breakfast show on Sky One each morning for an hour between 7:30am and 8:30am. When a track was played on the radio, viewers see the track's video at the same time.
- 1999
  - 11 September – BBC Radio 3 breakfast programme On Air is renamed Morning on 3.

== 2000s ==
- 2000
  - 10 March – Zoe Ball presents the BBC Radio 1 breakfast show for the final time. Scott Mills then begins a three-week stint as the show's temporary presenter. By coincidence, Mills would succeed Ball as the presenter of the Radio 2 breakfast show 25 years later.
  - 31 March – Sara Cox takes over as presenter of the Radio 1 breakfast show three days earlier than planned, and Mark Chapman hosts his first ever Newsbeat sports bulletins.
- 2001
  - 28 June – Chris Evans is dismissed from Virgin Radio for repeatedly failing to arrive at work. He is replaced by the older Steve Penk whom Evans criticised for his age, 39 versus Evans's then 35.
- 2002
  - 28 January – Daryl Denham takes over Virgin Radio's breakfast show from Steve Penk.
- 2003
  - 6 January – Pete and Geoff take over as presenters of Virgin Radio's weekday breakfast show. They replace Daryl Denham who moves to the Drivetime show.
  - 13 January – Nicky Campbell replaces Julian Worricker as co-host of the breakfast show on BBC Radio 5 Live.
  - 9 June – Simon Bates replaces Henry Kelly as Classic FM's weekday breakfast show presenter.
  - 20 September – Spoony takes over as the sole presenter of Radio 1's Weekend Breakfast Show.
  - 19 December – Sara Cox presents her final BBC Radio 1 breakfast show.
- 2004
  - 5 January – Chris Moyles takes over the BBC Radio 1 breakfast show with a return of the zoo format.
- 2005
  - 16 December – Pete and Geoff present Virgin Radio's breakfast show for the final time.
- 2006
  - 23 January – Christian O'Connell presents the first edition of The Christian O'Connell Breakfast Show on Virgin Radio.
  - 23 September – Fearne Cotton and Reggie Yates replace DJ Spoony as presenters of Radio 1's Weekend Breakfast Show.
- 2007
  - 17 September – BBC Radio 3's breakfast programme is renamed from Mornings on 3 to Breakfast.
  - 13 October – Nihal replaces Fearne Cotton and Reggie Yates as the host of Radio 1's Weekend Breakfast Show.
- 2008
  - 6 September – Chappers and Dave present Radio 1's Weekend Breakfast Show for six weeks until Nick Grimshaw takes over on 25 October.
- 2009
  - March – Frank Skinner joins Absolute Radio to host the Saturday breakfast show. The show was initially planned to last 12 weeks but is extended due to its popularity. The show ran until 2024 with both Emily Dean and Alun Cochrane.
  - 26 September – Edith Bowman becomes the permanent presenter of Radio 1's Weekend Breakfast Show after Chappers and Dave and Dev had presented the show over the Summer.
  - 18 December – After 28 years in 2 separate stints, Sir Terry Wogan presents his final Radio 2 breakfast show.

== 2010s ==
- 2010
  - 11 January – Chris Evans takes over from Sir Terry Wogan as presenter of the breakfast show on BBC Radio 2. The show's launch also sees the return of newsreader Moira Stuart to the BBC after two years away.
- 2011
  - No events.
- 2012
  - 7 April – Gemma Cairney replaces Edith Bowman as presenter of Radio 1's Weekend Breakfast Show.
  - 29 June – Tim Lihoreau replaces Mark Forrest as host of the weekday breakfast show on Classic FM with Jane Jones taking over the weekend breakfast show and John Brunning replaces Mark as presenter of the weekly chart show.
  - 14 September – Chris Moyles hosts his final breakfast show on BBC Radio 1.
  - 24 September – Nick Grimshaw takes over The Radio 1 Breakfast Show.
- 2013
  - April – Tony Livesey becomes the new BBC Radio 5 Live weekend breakfast show host.
  - 16 July – Mishal Husain joins the presenting team of the Today programme on BBC Radio 4.
  - 15 November – Sara Mohr-Pietsch presents Radio 3 Breakfast for the final time. She is replaced on 2 December by weekend breakfast presenter Clemency Burton-Hill.
- 2014
  - 29 March – Dev replaces Gemma Cairney as presenter of Radio 1's Weekend Breakfast Show.
- 2015
  - 21 September – Chris Moyles relaunches The Chris Moyles Show on Radio X, itself a relaunch of the former Xfm, broadcast nationally on DAB for the first time.
  - 16 December – After 21 years, James Naughtie presents the Today programme for the final time.
- 2016
- 22 June – Jazz FM announces it will extend its morning business programme, Business Breakfast from 30 minutes to an hour on 24 June to cover the results of the EU membership referendum.
- 2017
- 3 January – Former Free Radio presenter Gemma Hill joins Ed James as co-presenter of Heart Breakfast at Heart West Midlands
- 8 January – Simon Bates confirms he has left BBC Radio Devon after presenting their breakfast show for two years.
  - 20 March – Alex Lester at Breakfast debuts on BBC Radio WM
    - 22 May – A light-hearted quiz concerning Moors murderer Ian Brady which appeared on Nathan Turvey's BBC Radio Leeds breakfast show the previous day is described by the BBC as "unacceptable".
- 2018
  - 4 February – Good Morning Sunday is relaunched and extended into a three-hour show. Presented by Kate Bottley and Jason Mohammad as Jason himself joins BBC Radio 2.
  - April – Martha Kearney and Sarah Montague swap roles with Sarah leaving the Today programme after 17 years and Martha leaving The World at One after 11 years.
  - 18 May – Christian O'Connell presents Absolute Radio’s breakfast show for the final time. He is replaced on 4 June by Dave Berry.
  - 9 August – Nick Grimshaw presents The Radio 1 Breakfast Show for the final time.
  - 20 August – Greg James becomes the 16th person to present Radio 1 Breakfast.
  - 26 October – BBC Radio 1 announces a schedule change that will see Matt Edmondson and Mollie King co-presenting the Radio 1 Weekend Breakfast Show.
  - 24 December – After presenting The Radio 2 Breakfast Show for the past eight years, Chris Evans presents the final edition of The Chris Evans Breakfast Show on BBC Radio 2, as he leaves the station to join Virgin Radio UK while Vassos Alexander and Rachel Horne both leave at the same time.
- 2019
  - 14 January – Zoe Ball takes over as presenter of The Radio 2 Breakfast Show as Richie Anderson, the new travel news reporter for weekday mornings and Tina Daheley both join the station.
  - 8 April – The Capital breakfast show switches from a network of regional programmes to a single nationwide output (except on Capital Cymru), syndicating the London-based programme then hosted by Roman Kemp, Vick Hope and Sonny Jay.
  - 3 June – Heart follows Capital in introducing a nationally syndicated weekday breakfast show in place of previous local and regional morning programmes, hosted from Leicester Square in London by Jamie Theakston and Amanda Holden; Theakston had previously presented the Heart London breakfast show with Emma Bunton.
  - 6 September – The new early weekend breakfast show on BBC Radio 1 is running from Friday to Sunday and is presented by Arielle Free. Mollie King gained a new slot, namely Best New Pop.
  - 19 September – John Humphrys presents his final edition of BBC Radio 4's Today programme after 32 years.

== 2020s ==
- 2020
  - 3 January – Smooth Radio announces that Jenni Falconer has joined the network to present the Breakfast Show in London, replacing Gary King.
- 6 July – The 5am hour on BBC Local Radio is an England-wide simulcast of the first hour of BBC Radio London's breakfast show, which is presented by Jason Rosam.
- 26 September – Simon Phillips joins Jazz FM to present Weekend Breakfast.
- 6 November Adele Roberts announced as the weekend breakfast show presenter on Radio 1.
- 2021
  - 9 January – Adele Roberts replaces Matt Edmondson and Mollie King as the presenter of Radio 1's Weekend Breakfast Show.
  - 5 November – Nicky Campbell presents his final Breakfast Show on BBC Radio 5 Live. He had co-presented the show for the past 18 years.
  - 8 November – Rick Edwards joins Rachel Burden to present a new-look breakfast show on BBC Radio 5 Live. He replaces Nicky Campbell who moves to a new mid-morning slot.
- 2022
  - 7 February – Virgin Radio's The Chris Evans Breakfast show was announced to be getting adverts it has been ad-free since its launch in 2019.
  - 13 February – Reality television star Sam Thompson joins Hits Radio to present Sunday morning breakfast.
  - 25 April – Nicola Lashley joins Viking FM to present breakfast alongside Alex Duffy
  - 6 May – The BBC announces that YouTuber and comedian Hashu Mohammed, also known as Smashbengali, will replace Harpz Kaur as host of the BBC Asian Network's Weekend Breakfast show from 11 June.
  - 12 May – The BBC announces that Emil Franchi, Ben Coley, Emma-Louise and Emma Millen will each host the Friday edition of BBC Radio 1's Early Breakfast show on a monthly rotation, beginning from July.
  - 4 July –Iain Lee joins Jack FM Oxfordshire to present the breakfast show.
- 2023
  - 9 September – Sam MacGregor and Danni Diston take over Radio 1's Weekend Breakfast Show, replacing Adele Roberts.
- 2024
  - 8 January – Dan Walker replaces Tim Lihoreau as the weekday Classic FM breakfast presenter, with the programme moving to a new slot - 6:30am to 10am. Tim moves to the weekend breakfast show.
  - 9 August – Gaby Roslin presents The Radio 2 Breakfast Show after its usual presenter, Zoe Ball, is unexpectedly absent.
  - 12 August – Scott Mills temporarily takes over as presenter of The Radio 2 Breakfast Show, while Zoe Ball takes an unannounced six week absence. DJ Spoony and occasionally OJ Borg host Mills' afternoon show during this period.
  - August – Lauren Laverne steps aside from the BBC Radio 6 Music breakfast show to undergo cancer treatment; other DJs, including Nick Grimshaw, host the show on an interim basis.
  - 19 November – Zoe Ball announces that she is to step down as host of The Radio 2 Breakfast Show in December, after nearly six years in the role.
  - 20 December – Zoe Ball presents her final Radio 2 Breakfast Show.
  - 24 December – An interim Breakfast Show on BBC Radio 2 begins airing, hosted by Gaby Roslin and later by Mark Goodier and OJ Borg.
- 2025
  - 9 January – It is announced that Nick Grimshaw is to become the permanent presenter of the BBC Radio 6 Music breakfast show from February.
  - 27 January – Scott Mills takes over The Radio 2 Breakfast Show.
  - 24 February – Having retained regional breakfast shows in 2019 in favour of introducing a networked drivetime show, Smooth Radio follows siblings Capital and Heart in relaying a single breakfast programme across all its regional FM licences in England; the show is hosted by Jenni Falconer, who had been hosting breakfast on Smooth London (and Smooth Wales, and the networked Smooth UK feed) since January 2020. Displaced Smooth North West and Smooth West Midlands breakfast hosts Darren Parks and Nigel Freshman were retained by Global in other roles, the latter on breakfast at Smooth 80s.
  - 9 June – Bauer begins networking a single breakfast show across its Hits Radio network in England and Wales. Joel Ross of Hits Radio Lancashire and Hits Radio Liverpool moves to breakfast at Hits Radio 00s, whilst Steve & Karen's Breakfast Show moves from Hits Radio North East and Hits Radio Teesside to Hits Radio 90s.
- 2026
  - 30 March – The BBC announces the sacking of Scott Mills from BBC Radio 2 over allegations regarding his 'personal conduct', with Gary Davies having presented his breakfast show since the previous Wednesday, and would do so until 3 July.
  - 6 July – Sara Cox starts presenting The Radio 2 Breakfast Show.
