= 2018 in British radio =

This is a list of events taking place in 2018 relating to radio in the United Kingdom.

== Events ==
=== January ===
- 8 January – Matt Hancock is appointed Secretary of State for Culture, Media and Sport in a Cabinet reshuffle, replacing Karen Bradley.
- 9 January – Winifred Robinson, the main presenter of BBC Radio 4's You and Yours, is taken off air after posting her views concerning the BBC gender pay gap controversy on Twitter the previous day.
- 10 January – BBC Radio 2 announces a major overhaul of its schedule that will take effect from 14 May. Among the changes will be the start of a three-hour joint drivetime show presented by Simon Mayo and Jo Whiley, and a new weekday overnight show presented by O. J. Borg. Some long-running programmes, such as The Organist Entertains will come to an end, and Paul Jones will leave the network after presenting a blues programme for three decades; he will be succeeded by Cerys Matthews.
- 12 January – The BBC is reported to be "deeply unimpressed" by an off-air conversation between John Humphrys and Jon Sopel in which they joked about the gender pay gap controversy. The conversation is said to have occurred before the 8 January edition of the Today programme, the morning after the BBC's China correspondent, Carrie Gracie resigned from her post over the issue of gender pay.
- 15 January – The MW transmissions of BBC Radios Sussex, Surrey, Humberside, Wiltshire, Nottingham, Kent and Lincolnshire are switched off and MW coverage for BBC Devon, Lancashire and Essex is reduced.
- 17 January – BBC Radio 1 announces an overhaul of its schedule from 24 February. The changes will see Maya Jama and Jordan North joining the network as weekend presenters, fronting the Greatest Hits programme, while current presenter Matt Edmondson will present a weekday afternoon show on which he will be joined by a different guest co-presenter each week. Current afternoon presenter Alice Levine will move to weekend breakfasts to co-present with Dev.
- 23 January – The BBC confirms that Aled Jones will return to his presenting roles on BBC One's Songs of Praise and BBC Radio Wales after he was suspended in October 2017.
- 24 January – BFBS returns to semi-national DAB broadcasting when it launches on the Sound Digital multiplex.
- 26 January – Six of the BBC's leading male presenters—Huw Edwards, Nicky Campbell, John Humphrys, Jon Sopel, Nick Robinson and Jeremy Vine—have agreed to take pay cuts following the recent controversy over equal salaries at the broadcaster.
- 28 January – After nearly 78 years on air, The Sunday Hour is broadcast on BBC Radio 2 for the final time.
- 29 January – BBC Radio Cymru 2 begins broadcasting. It airs as an opt-out service for two hours every morning on digital and online platforms as a music and entertainment alternative to the main network.
- Undated in January – Rob Cowan leaves BBC Radio 3 for Classic FM after seventeen years at the station. He is replaced as presenter of Essential Classics by Ian Skelly.

=== February ===
- 2 February – Christian O'Connell announces that he will be leaving Absolute Radio and emigrating to Australia to host the Gold 104.3 breakfast programme in Melbourne.
- 4 February –
  - Relaunch of the BBC Radio 2 religion-themed magazine programme Good Morning Sunday, presented by Kate Bottley and Jason Mohammad.
  - Comedian Jack Whitehall appears as a guest on Desert Island Discs, where he expresses regret over a joke he made about Queen Elizabeth and Prince Philip during the 2012 edition of Channel 4's The Big Fat Quiz of the Year.
- 6 February – Noel Edmonds has set up an online radio station, Positively Noel, dedicated to broadcasting negative messages about Lloyds Bank, a company with which the presenter has been involved in a decade-long legal dispute.
- 7 February – Figures from RAJAR indicate that The Radio 1 Breakfast Show with Nick Grimshaw has shown some recovery from its worst ever audience during the third quarter of 2017. The number of listeners to the show increased from 4.93m listeners in the third quarter of 2017 to 5.72m listeners in January 2018, an increase of almost 800,000.
- 16 February – Speaking to BBC 6 Music Glastonbury Festival organiser Emily Eavis says she would like to ban plastic bottles from next year's festival.
- 24 February – BBC Radio 1 overhauls its weekend schedule. The changes see Maya Jama and Jordan North joining the network as weekend presenters, fronting the Greatest Hits programme, while current presenter Matt Edmondson moves to present a weekday afternoon show on which he will be joined by a different guest co-presenter each week. Alice Levine moves from afternoons to weekend breakfasts to co-present with Dev.
- 26 February – Former Emmerdale actress Roxanne Pallett joins York's Minster FM to present the breakfast show alongside Ben Fry.

=== March ===
- 1 March – Global Radio holds its inaugural awards ceremony, the Global Awards at London's Hammersmith Eventim Apollo.
- 5 March – Cumbrian stations The Bay and Lakeland Radio are relaunched as Heart North Lancashire & Cumbria and Smooth Lake District respectfully following Global's purchase of the two stations from CN Group.
- 6 March – Launch of You, Me and the Big C on BBC iPlayer Radio, a podcast that discusses matters relating to cancer.
- 7 March –
  - BBC Radio 2 announces that Nick Drake will be inducted into its Folk Hall of Fame to mark what would have been the singer's 70th birthday.
  - It is announced that the trial of small-scale digital radio multiplexes will be extended until 2020.
- 16 March – Radio 2 travel presenter Lynn Bowles, who has been with the station since 2000, tells listeners she is leaving at Easter. She leaves the network on 29 March.
- 18 March – Andrew Castle presents his final show for Smooth, the Sunday Sanctuary. He is replaced the following week by Gary Vincent.
- 19 March – The BBC says it will continue FM transmissions for the foreseeable future rather than switching entirely over to digital broadcasting.
- 21 March – Jazz FM have signed singer China Moses to present their late night weekday programme Jazz FM Loves. At the same time, dating website eHarmony have renewed their sponsorship of the programme for another twelve months.
- 24 March – BBC Radio 3's Controller Alan Davey announces a raft of new programmes, including a new world music show called Music Planet which will replace World on 3 and a new weeknight late show called After Dark.
- 27 March – Ofcom releases new guidelines covering the music played on BBC Radio 1. It states that 50% of songs played on the network during the day must be "new music", defining that term as any track up to twelve months after its release or six weeks after it enters the charts. The changes could lead to a faster turnover of Radio 1 and Radio 2 playlists.

=== April ===
- 3 April –
  - Northsound 2 stops broadcasting on MW. The station continues to broadcast on DAB and online. It is the first commercial radio station in Scotland – and the first of Bauer's local stations – to cease analogue broadcasting.
  - LBC announces that Jacob Rees-Mogg will present a fortnightly phone-in show on the station.
- 8 April – Louise Redknapp makes her radio debut, guest presenting the first of two evening shows on Heart, her second being on 15 April respectively.
- 12 April – The BBC has come under fire over its planned broadcast of an edition of the Radio 4 programme Archive on 4 featuring actor Ian McDiarmid reading the full text of Enoch Powell's controversial 1968 "Rivers of Blood" speech. The BBC says the programme, scheduled for 14 April and which marks the 50th anniversary of the speech, is intended as an analysis of the speech not as an endorsement of it.
- 17 April – London-based internet station Radar Radio suspends broadcasting following allegations of mistreatment and exploitation of its staff.
- 18 April – Bauer Radio announces that, on 4 June, its Manchester station Key 103 will be rebranded and relaunched as Hits Radio, a CHR-led music station aimed at 25–44 year olds. The station will be merged with The Hits to provide a single national service across the UK on DAB, Freeview and online. In Manchester, Hits Radio will continue to provide local news and information, traffic bulletins and advertising. Hits Radio will also produce and broadcast off-peak programming for Bauer's network of CHR local stations which will continue to air local programming at peak times. Gemma Atkinson, Gethin Jones and Dave Vitty are announced as breakfast presenters on the new station.

=== May ===
- 4 May – Dermot O'Leary and Scarlett Moffatt are announced as presenters who will lead the BBC's respective television and radio coverage of the wedding of Prince Harry and Meghan Markle, O'Leary fronting coverage for BBC One and Moffatt providing coverage for Radio 1.
- 7 May – "Perfect" by Ed Sheeran is voted favourite song by listeners to Smooth Radio in their annual Top 500.
- 8 May – Long running specialist music programmes The Organist Entertains and Listen to the Band are broadcast for the final time – the former has been on air since 1969.
- 10 May – The final edition of the Radio 2 Arts Programme is broadcast, ending after 28 years on air.
- 14 May – A new weekday evening and overnight schedule launches on BBC Radio 2. Jo Whiley joins Simon Mayo to present an extended teatime show with Jo's former slot now occupied by specialist music and documentaries. Sara Cox launches a new late evening show and live overnight broadcasting resumes with a new midnight to 3 am show presented by O.J. Borg.
- 15 May – Sound Digital announces that it will add 19 transmitters to its network. They will launch in the South West, East Anglia, Wales and North of Scotland and will increase Sound Digital's coverage by nearly 4 million new listeners in more than 1.6m new households.
- 17 May – The latest RAJAR listening figures show that more than half of radio listening is via digital platforms, overtaking FM and AM for the first time.
- 18 May – Christian O'Connell presents the Absolute Radio breakfast show for the final time.
- 25 May – Ahead of the launch of Hits Radio on 4 June, the name Key 103 disappears from the Manchester airwaves.
- 28 May – Smooth Radio launches The Smooth Late Show, a nightly show that is presented by Martin Collins on weekdays and Danny Pietroni at weekends.
- 31 May – BBC Radio 1 announces that, in the autumn, Nick Grimshaw and Greg James are to swap shows. James will become the new host of the Radio 1 Breakfast Show and Grimshaw will take over the drive time show.

=== June ===
- 4 June –
  - Manchester station Key 103 is rebranded as Hits Radio Manchester. The station is a localised version of The Hits Radio which replaces DAB station The Hits.
  - Key 2 is renamed Key Radio.
- 12 June – For the first time since its inception, Ofcom does not award a re-advertised licence to the incumbent licensee when it awards the Ipswich licence to Ipswich FM. Consequently, Town 102 will end broadcasting on 18 October.
- 15 June –
  - Radio 1 starts broadcasting much of its weekend schedule on Fridays meaning that the weekday daytime schedule is now broadcast only from Mondays to Thursdays.
    - Scott Mills replaces Greg James as host of The Official Chart and Radio 1's Dance Anthems.
    - Kylie Minogue will headline BBC Radio 2's "festival in a day" at Hyde Park on 9 September. She will be joined by acts including All Saints, Rita Ora, Manic Street Preachers and Lenny Kravitz.
- 28 June – The final broadcasts of BBC School Radio take place, bringing to an end almost a century of programmes for schools on BBC Radio.

=== July ===
- 1 July – The BBC confirms that Eddie Mair will leave Radio 4 after three decades with the network. The following day Mair announces he will be joining LBC to present a programme from September. His final broadcast for Radio 4 will be on 17 August.
- 5 July – It is announced that Ellie Taylor and Anna Whitehouse will present a new talk show on Heart FM on Sunday nights from 10pm–1am.
- 7 July – Dame Barbara Windsor is to present the first episode of Double Acts, a series examining prominent comedy partnerships for Radio 2. It is her first project since disclosing her diagnosis of Alzheimer's disease in May.
- 18 July – Actress and Minster FM breakfast show presenter Roxanne Pallett is airlifted to hospital after being involved in a car crash while taking part in a stock car race at Hunmanby Raceway in North Yorkshire. She was racing fellow breakfast show presenter Ben Fry at the time the incident occurred, and crashed into a concrete wall.
- 19 July – Greg James presented Radio 1's Drivetime Show for the final time.
- 24 July – Former BBC sports commentator John Motson will come out of retirement to become a presenter on Talksport, it is reported, beginning his new role in August.
- 26 July – BBC Radio 1 pulls a pre-recorded interview with YouTuber Logan Paul that was due to be aired during Charlie Sloth's evening show after publicity about the piece drew a negative response from listeners.
- 31 July – Global announces that it has purchased Lancashire station 2BR from UKRD.

=== August ===
- 2 August – Global announces that Brighton and Hove station Juice 107.2, which it purchased in January, will be relaunched as Capital Brighton from Monday 3 September.
- 3 August – Broadcaster James Whale is suspended from Talk Radio following an interview with a rape victim on the 30 July edition of his show that the station has described as having "completely lacked sensitivity".
- 3–5 August – BBC Radio 1's annual Ibiza weekend takes place.
- 8 August – Eddie Mair presents his final edition of PM.
- 9 August –
  - Nick Grimshaw presents the Radio 1 Breakfast Show for the final time.
  - BBC 6 Music announces that Lauren Laverne will replace Shaun Keaveny as presenter of its breakfast show from January 2019.
- 16 August – Bauer Radio purchases Jazz FM.
- 20 August – Greg James becomes the 16th person to present the Radio 1 Breakfast Show.

=== September ===
- 3 September –
  - Nick Grimshaw takes over as host of BBC Radio 1's drivetime show.
  - Chris Evans reveals live on air he is to leave his Radio 2 breakfast show at the end of the year. He will join Virgin Radio to present their breakfast show.
  - Eddie Mair begins presenting the drivetime show on LBC.
- 9 September – Kylie Minogue and Jason Donovan are reunited on stage to perform their 1988 hit "Especially for You" at the Radio 2 Live in Hyde Park festival, where Minogue is the headlining act.
- 11 September – BBC Director-General Tony Hall tells a committee of MPs that the publication of BBC salaries was a contributing facture in the departure of Eddie Mair and Chris Evans from the broadcaster.
- 20 September – Evan Davis is confirmed as Eddie Mair's replacement as the main presenter of PM, and will take up the role from the end of October.
- 28 September – To mark BBC Music Day, railway stations around the country play a number of prerecorded announcements made by the singer Kylie Minogue.

=== October ===
- 3 October –
  - Charlie Sloth announces he will leave BBC Radio 1 and BBC 1Xtra after ten years.
  - It is announced that Zoë Ball will take over as presenter of The Radio 2 Breakfast Show in January 2019.
- 6 October – The final edition of Eastern Horizon is broadcast on BBC Radio Manchester. The programme had been broadcasting a weekly programme for the city's Chinese community for nearly 35 years.
- 11 October – After six years on air, Global Radio closes its spin-off music television channels Heart TV and Capital TV.
- 18 October – Ipswich 102 replaces Town 102 as the FM station covering Ipswich.
- 20 October – Having announced earlier in the month that he is leaving Radio 1 and BBC 1Xtra, Charlie Sloth now says this will happen with immediate effect. Previously he had been scheduled to leave in November. His evening show the 8th with Charlie Sloth is to be presented by Dev until Christmas
- 22 October – Radio 2's unpopular Drivetime Show with Simon Mayo and Jo Whiley is to end after a backlash from listeners. Jo Whiley will move back to an evening slot, while Simon Mayo will leave Radio 2 altogether but continue with his BBC Radio 5 Live film review show.
- 23 October – Launch of Jack Radio on DAB, the first radio station to have a playlist made up entirely of female artists. Jack will also feature female sports and material from female stand-up comedians.
- 25 October – Figures from RAJAR indicate Radio 2 has recorded its lowest audience since 2012, registering an audience of 14.6 million between July and September, down 800,000 on the same time in 2017. The Chris Evans Breakfast Show has likewise recorded its lowest listenership since 2012, falling to 8.9 million from 9.4 million over the same time period.
- 26 October – Radio 1 announces a schedule change that will see Matt Edmondson and Mollie King co-presenting the Radio 1 Weekend Breakfast Show, while Dev and Alice Levine will move to weekend afternoons.
- 29 October –
  - Sara Cox is named as Radio 2's new Drivetime presenter, replacing Simon Mayo. Although a date for her start is yet to be confirmed, it is announced that the show will return to its two-hour format from 5.00pm to 7.00pm. The start date of Whiley's return evening show is subsequently confirmed for January 2019.
  - The BBC announces the launch of BBC Sounds, an app that brings together the broadcaster's radio, music and podcasts, and replaces BBC iPlayer's Radio.
- 30 October – Emilia Jaques and Cassian Pichler-Roca are named as the winners of BBC Radio 2's Young Choristers of the Year.

=== November ===
- 8 November – Rylan Clark-Neal is named as presenter of the BBC Radio 2 Saturday teatime show, while the Saturday evening slot vacated by Trevor Nelson will be filled by some of the displaced weeknight specialist shows.
- 23 November – Radio 5 Live's Emma Barnett presents a phone-in with Prime Minister Theresa May; the programme is also broadcast on the BBC News channel.
- 26 November – Kiss breakfast presenters Rickie Haywood Williams, Melvin Odoom and Charlie Hedges will leave the station to succeed Charlie Sloth on the evening show on BBC Radio 1.

=== December ===
- 10 December – Emma Bunton announces she will step down from her Heart Breakfast co-presenting role alongside Jamie Theakston on Heart London, making her final appearance on the programme on 14 December.
- 11 December – Tom Green and Daisy Maskell are announced as the new breakfast show co-presenters on Kiss, and will take up their roles from 2 January 2019.
- 17 December – Classic FM announces that Moira Stuart will join the network in February 2019 as a weekday newsreader and to present a programme at weekends. Stuart, who has been with the BBC for forty years, will leave her role at Radio 2.
- 19 December – Talk Radio presenter Iain Lee helps to save the life of a man who calls into his show claiming to have taken a drugs overdose. Lee keeps the man from Plymouth talking for 30 minutes until emergency services can locate and treat him. The man is treated in hospital and later released.
- 22 December – David Dimbleby guest edits Radio 4's Today programme.
- 24 December – Chris Evans presents his final breakfast show on Radio 2.
- 25 December – Take That present a two-hour Christmas special on Radio 2 to celebrate their 30th anniversary.
- 28 December – Angelina Jolie guest edits Radio 4's Today programme.

== Station debuts ==
- 29 January – BBC Radio Cymru 2
- 19 March – Love Sport Radio
- 3 April – Jack 3
- 1 August – Ipswich 102
- 3 September – Nation Radio Scotland
- 23 October – Jack Radio
- 22 December – Virgin Radio Anthems and Virgin Radio Chilled

== Programme debuts ==
- 1 January – Conversations from a Long Marriage on BBC Radio 4 (2018–2020)
- 10 January – Angstrom on BBC Radio 4 (2018)
- 6 March – You, Me and the Big C on BBC iPlayer Radio
- 25 June – Quanderhorn on BBC Radio 4 (2018–2020)
- 20 August – Radio 1 Breakfast with Greg James
- 3 September – Nick Grimshaw begins Radio 1 Drivetime

== Continuing radio programmes ==
=== 1940s ===
- Desert Island Discs (1942–Present)
- Woman's Hour (1946–Present)
- A Book at Bedtime (1949–Present)

=== 1950s ===
- The Archers (1950–Present)
- The Today Programme (1957–Present)

=== 1960s ===
- Farming Today (1960–Present)
- In Touch (1961–Present)
- The World at One (1965–Present)
- The Official Chart (1967–Present)
- Just a Minute (1967–Present)
- The Living World (1968–Present)

=== 1970s ===
- PM (1970–Present)
- Start the Week (1970–Present)
- You and Yours (1970–Present)
- I'm Sorry I Haven't a Clue (1972–Present)
- Good Morning Scotland (1973–Present)
- Newsbeat (1973–Present)
- File on 4 (1977–Present)
- Money Box (1977–Present)
- The News Quiz (1977–Present)
- Feedback (1979–Present)
- The Food Programme (1979–Present)
- Science in Action (1979–Present)

=== 1980s ===
- Steve Wright in the Afternoon (1981–1993, 1999–2022)
- In Business (1983–Present)
- Sounds of the 60s (1983–Present)
- Loose Ends (1986–Present)

=== 1990s ===
- The Moral Maze (1990–Present)
- Essential Selection (1991–Present)
- Essential Mix (1993–Present)
- Up All Night (1994–Present)
- Wake Up to Money (1994–Present)
- Private Passions (1995–Present)
- In Our Time (1998–Present)
- Material World (1998–Present)
- Scott Mills (1998–2022)
- The Now Show (1998–Present)

=== 2000s ===
- BBC Radio 2 Folk Awards (2000–Present)
- Big John @ Breakfast (2000–Present)
- Sounds of the 70s (2000–2008, 2009–Present)
- Dead Ringers (2000–2007, 2014–Present)
- Kermode and Mayo's Film Review (2001–2022)
- A Kist o Wurds (2002–Present)
- Fighting Talk (2003–Present)
- Jeremy Vine (2003–Present)
- The Chris Moyles Show (2004–2012, 2015–Present)
- Annie Mac (2004–2021)
- Elaine Paige on Sunday (2004–Present)
- The Bottom Line (2006–Present)
- The Christian O'Connell Breakfast Show (2006–Present)
- The Unbelievable Truth (2006–Present)
- Radcliffe & Maconie (2007–Present)
- The Media Show (2008–Present)
- Newsjack (2009–Present)
- Paul O'Grady on the Wireless (2009–2022)
- Alan and Mel's Summer Escape (2009–2020)

=== 2010s ===
- The Chris Evans Breakfast Show (2010–2018)
- Graham Norton (2010–2020)
- Simon Mayo Drivetime (2010–2018)
- The Third Degree (2011–Present)
- BBC Radio 1's Dance Anthems (2012–Present)
- Late Night Graham Torrington (2012–2020)
- The Radio 1 Breakfast Show with Nick Grimshaw (2012–2018)
- Sounds of the 80s (2013–Present)
- Question Time Extra Time (2013–Present)
- The Show What You Wrote (2013–Present)
- Friday Sports Panel (2014–Present)
- Home Front (2014–2018)
- Stumped (2015–Present)
- Alex Lester at Breakfast (2017–2019)
- Brexitcast (2017–2020)
- The Nigel Farage Show (2017–2020)

== Ending this year ==
- 23 January – The Sunday Hour (1940–2018)
- 8 May – The Organist Entertains (1969–2018)
- 9 August – The Radio 1 Breakfast Show with Nick Grimshaw (2012–2018)
- 10 November – Home Front (2014–2018)
- 21 December – Simon Mayo Drivetime (2010–2018)
- 24 December – The Chris Evans Breakfast Show (2010–2018)

== Closing this year ==
Date	Station	Debut(s)
14 August	Juice 107.2	1998
15 August	NECR	1994

== Deaths ==
- 16 January – Ed Doolan, 76, Australian-born broadcaster (BBC Radio WM, BRMB; first local presenter to be inducted into the Radio Academy Hall of Fame)
- 28 February – Jeff Harris, presenter (Mercia, Saga Radio, Smooth Radio, BBC radio)
- 5 March – Trevor Baylis, 80, inventor of the windup radio
- 14 March – Jim Bowen, 80, comedian and broadcast presenter
- 20 March – Katie Boyle, 91, BBC Radio 2 presenter
- 18 April – Dale Winton, 62, broadcast presenter
- 20 May – Colin Morris, 89, Methodist minister and religious broadcaster.
- 1 June – John Julius Norwich, 88, broadcaster and presenter (BBC Radio 4, Classic FM)
- 6 June – Teddy Johnson, 98, singer and radio presenter (Radio Luxembourg, BBC Radio 2)
- 10 June – Paddy Feeney, 87, broadcaster
- 6 August – Vicki Archer, 41, presenter (BBC Radio Shropshire)
- 5 September – Rachael Bland, 40, journalist, newsreader and presenter (BBC Radio 5 Live), breast cancer
- 19 September – Denis Norden, 96, comedy writer, television presenter and radio personality (Take It from Here, It'll be Alright on the Night, My Music).
- 1 October – Michael Freedland, 83, biographer, journalist and broadcaster
- 6 October – Ray Galton, 88, comedy writer
- 11 October – Duncan Johnson, 80, Canadian-born BBC Radio 1 DJ
- 1 November – Peter Young, broadcaster (Capital FM, Jazz FM)
- 17 November – Richard Baker, 93, broadcaster and newsreader
- 20 November – Monica Sims, 93, BBC radio executive
