= The Chris Evans Breakfast Show =

Radio Program

The Chris Evans Breakfast Show (currently referred to on-air due to sponsorship reasons as The Chris Evans Breakfast Show with The National Lottery) is the name given to two versions of a radio programme hosted by broadcaster Chris Evans in the United Kingdom. The first was the incarnation of The Radio 2 Breakfast Show that aired every weekday morning between 11 January 2010 and 24 December 2018. Evans had taken over from Terry Wogan, who ended his stint as the station's morning presenter on 18 December 2009. On 3 September 2018, it was announced by Evans live on air that he would be leaving the network. The show broadcast its final episode on BBC Radio 2 on 24 December 2018. On 3 October 2018, it was announced by Evans live on air that Zoe Ball would take over the slot, with her first broadcast airing on 14 January 2019. Evans meanwhile started the second incarnation of the show on Virgin Radio that began on 21 January 2019.

== Virgin Radio UK version ==
The Chris Evans Breakfast Show with Sky
- Podcast image
- Genre: Talk; Music
- Running time: Weekdays: 6.30am-10.00am
- Country of origin: United Kingdom
- Language: English
- Home station: Virgin Radio
- Hosted by: Chris Evans; Vassos Alexander; Rachel Horne
- Recording studio: The News Building, London, United Kingdom
- Original release: 21 January 2019

Evans announced in September 2018 that he would be leaving Radio 2 to move to commercial station Virgin Radio from January 2019. Joining Evans in his move from Radio 2 will be sports reporter Vassos Alexander, news and travel reporter Rachel Horne, executive producer Ellie Davis and several other behind-the-scenes staff. Sky News will provide weather updates. The show launched on Monday 21 January 2019 and is 30 minutes longer than its previous incarnation. The show is ad-break free due to the all-encompassing sponsorship deal with Sky.

In addition to the weekday breakfast show, for his first six weeks on air Evans presented a live Sunday morning programme from 10am to 1pm, titled The Chris Evans Ministry of Now with Sky. The programme ran from 27 January to 3 March 2019. Evans' regular sports reporter Vassos Alexander and featured guest Noel Fitzpatrick joined him each week for the programme. After it ended, it was replaced with a recorded programme featuring highlights from the weekday breakfast show, under the title The Best of The Chris Evans Breakfast Show with Sky.

The Chris Evans Breakfast show also broadcasts on Virgin Radio Anthems UK, Virgin Radio Chilled UK and Virgin Radio 80s Plus.

Features

Features on the show include:

- Good Morning Chris Club
- Big Screen Belter
- Kids For a Fanfare
- Gobsmackers
- Absolute Class

The show is also available as a podcast every Friday, with highlights from the show from the past week, plus extra content and uncut interviews.

== Radio 2 version ==
The Chris Evans Breakfast Show (Radio 2)
- Genre: Talk; Music
- Running time: 150 Mins (Jan–Oct 2010) 180 Mins (Oct 2010-18)
- Country of origin: United Kingdom
- Language: English
- Home station: BBC Radio 2
- Hosted by: Chris Evans; Jonny Saunders (2010–11); Moira Stuart (2010-18); Lynn Bowles (2010–18); Vassos Alexander (2011–18); Rachel Horne (2018)
- Recording studio: Wogan House, London
- Original release: 11 January 2010 – 24 December 2018
- Audio format: 88–91 FM, DAB digital radio, TV and online
- Opening theme: 0630 Opener; 0700 TOH; 0800 TOH
- Website: Official site
- Podcast: The Best Bits

=== History and format ===
The show replaced the long running Wake Up to Wogan and Evans originally took over the airwaves from Sarah Kennedy after the news at 7:00 am but following her departure later in 2010, this was changed to 6:30 am (following the news headlines). He always finished with a handover to Ken Bruce at 9:30 am. It was confirmed on 7 September 2009 that Evans would succeed Wogan as he retired as presenter of the breakfast show at the end of that year.

On 6 January 2010, it was announced that Moira Stuart had returned to the BBC after two years away, becoming the show's regular newsreader. The original sports presenter Jonny Saunders was replaced by Vassos Alexander on 25 July 2011.

The first three songs played on the first broadcast of the show were The Beatles tracks "All You Need Is Love" and "Got To Get You Into My Life", and Frank Sinatra's "Come Fly with Me".

Evans's team of co-presenters on the show included ex-BBC TV newsreader Moira Stuart, sports presenter Vassos Alexander who took over from Jonny Saunders in July 2011 and travel reporter Rachel Horne who took over from long-serving travel reporter Lynn Bowles in March 2018. There were also sometimes roving reports from Joe Schmo (aka Joe Haddow) from various locations in the UK.

=== Features ===
Features on the show included:

- Introduction – Chris introduced the team over the theme from Joe 90.
- Good Morning Chris Club – at 6:40 am listeners emailed or text in with a reason to be in Chris's "club" and if he thought they should go in, he honked a horn. Background music was the theme from Thunderbirds.
- Big Screen Belter – a track featured in a movie at 6:45 am.
- On This Day – a run-down of significant events from history that occurred on that day read by a celebrity at 7:15 am. Background music was the theme from Dallas.
- Kids Get a Fanfare – a child got to tell the nation about something that they're going to do for the first time that day before coming back on the show the following day to talk about how it went (7:25 am).
- Moira's Golden Oldie (Christmas Golden Oldie) – Moira Stuart read out the request for a classic song selected by a listener after the news at 7:30 am. Renamed Moira's Christmas Golden Oldie from the last week of November through till the end of December.
- Frontpages – Chris read a selection of stories in the morning papers to the theme from Indiana Jones movies at 7:40 am. When Mark Goodier filled in for Chris, he parodied fellow Radio 2 show Pick of the Pops as Pick of the Papers, with the theme to the show instead of the Indiana Jones movie theme, and when Sara Cox filled in for Chris she uses the movie theme opening to Disney/Pixar's 2001 film Monsters, Inc. instead of the Indiana Jones movie theme as well.
- Listener Breaking News – Listeners contacted the show with pieces of their own news; Evans read a selection at 8:10 am. Usually, this was done over the theme music from The Champions, but during the summer this was temporarily replaced by an instrumental version of "Summer Holiday" by Cliff Richard and The Shadows. Previously the theme to The Adventures of Black Beauty, and prior to that the theme from Jurassic Park were used.
- Who's on the Phone? – Most weekdays at around 8:15 am, a celebrity was interviewed on the phone to plug a TV show or film that was either on TV during that week or out in cinemas.
- Smashers – Two classic songs from a selected decade were played every day after the news at 8:30 am. On Monday these are from the 1970s. Tuesday was 1980s, Wednesday was 1990s and Thursday was 2000s.
- Mystery Guest/Not So Mystery Guest – Chris conducted a three-minute "interesting, stimulating, and if it calls for it humorous" interview with a guest he had had no prior warning about, to the theme music from Agatha Christie's Poirot. Since around 2015, the team had now known about who will be talking, and the segment name changed to make the Mystery Guest a Not So Mystery Guest.
- Gobsmackers – two songs selected by a listener that sounded great when played back to back after the news at 9 am.
- Top Tenuous – listeners' texts and emails with tenuous connections to an event, object or celebrity read to the theme tune to Police Squad! at about 9:10 am.
- Pause for Thought – a brief reflection with themes of spirituality, religion, giving and faith (mostly of Christianity, but Muslim and Jewish contributors also feature); regular contributors included Reverend Rob Gillion, Rector of Holy Trinity Church and St Saviours who was, at one time, an actor in Tales of the Unexpected, and Muslim editor Sarah Joseph OBE. Other contributors have included the Archbishop of Canterbury and the Archbishop of York. This segment was carried over from Evans show's predecessor, Wake Up to Wogan.
- Good Old Fashioned – Listeners text in "good old-fashioned" greetings for friends and family. These were usually "good old-fashioned" hellos, happy birthdays, or happy anniversaries, read by Chris, Vassos and Lynn to Laurie Johnson's "Las Vegas" (better known as the theme tune from Animal Magic) at the end of the show, before he hands over to Ken Bruce.
- The 7:53 See - Listeners texted in what they can see in front of them and Evans read out the responses at 7:53am
- The Wrong Bongs – A short-lived feature where Lynn would read out a selection of listener texts that have been sent in correcting the team on facts that were wrong in the previous day's show. After each text, Chris would play a clip of one of the "bongs" from Big Ben.
- Head to Headlines – Vassos and Moira each chose three news stories each day, and Evans decides which of the stories is better in three head-to-head rounds per day (~8:25 am read to "Soul Bossa Nova" by Quincy Jones).
- Don't Forget – listeners emailed in a reminder for the day for a friend or relative to be read just before 9:30 am to the theme tune from Please Sir. Replaced by the "Good Old Fashioned"s in 2015.
- Hello/Goodbye – Listeners would phone up and greet Chris and the team with a 'Hello', only to be met with a 'Goodbye' in whatever tone of voice had been used by the listener, just before 9:30 am. Replaced by the "Don't Forget"s in 2012.

Whenever Chris was not presenting, a segment called The Half/Whole Wower, featuring non-stop music with a feel-good theme, ran from 8 am to 8:30 am. Whenever Sara Cox filled in for Chris, she used "Wow" by Kylie Minogue as the theme song; however Mark Goodier did not use it when he filled in for Chris, and Fearne Cotton also did not use it when she filled in for Chris as well.

Regular songs played included "Papa Loves Mambo" played on Mondays after the 8 am news, "Get Happy" by Judy Garland played on Tuesdays at the same time and "Happy" by Pharrell Williams on a Friday also after the 8 am news. Also, "The Tra La La Song (One Banana, Two Banana)" by The Banana Splits was played every Tuesday after the news at 7 am.

Previous regular songs have included "Sunchyme" by Dario G, played every Monday and "Talk to the Animals" by Sammy Davis Jr. (replacing "The Candy Man", also by Davis), played every Friday after the 8 am news throughout 2014. Both songs were replaced for 2015 with "The Deadwood Stage" from the film Calamity Jane played on a Monday and "Jump in the Line" also played on Mondays. "Bring Me Sunshine","Can't Feel My Face" by The Weeknd and "Happy Days" theme played on a Friday. Until December 2016, "How D'Ya Like Your Eggs in the Morning?" by Dean Martin and Helen O'Connell was played in full on Tuesdays, though an excerpt continued to be used as a daily jingle until the end of the show's run.

Sometimes, a re-written version of "Wake Up Boo!" by The Boo Radleys played as a jingle, as it once did on Evans' Radio 1 breakfast show.

=== Stand-in presenters ===
Evans' stand-in presenters included Graham Norton, Richard Allinson, Miranda Hart and Jon Holmes, Richard Madeley, Zoe Ball, Ryan Tubridy, Patrick Kielty, Sara Cox, Fearne Cotton, and Mark Goodier.

In October 2011 the show attracted criticism after Hart and Holmes co-hosted it for a week while Chris Evans was on holiday. The website Digital Spy reported that some listeners were unhappy with the quality of the programme. The BBC issued a statement in response saying, "Miranda Hart is one of the UK's best-loved comedians and BBC Radio 2 felt it appropriate to bring her warmth to its audience for a week. Jon Holmes is a highly experienced presenter from BBC Radio 6 Music [...] BBC Radio 2 appreciates if their presentation wasn't to everyone's liking, but feels it's important to be able to bring new talent to its output and hopes its audience understands the importance of maintaining a breadth of content on the network."

On 11 April 2013, Evans turned up to work with a sore throat, and ended up losing his voice. Sports Presenter Alexander stood in for Evans. Zoe Ball stood in for Evans the next day and the following Monday, with Richard Allinson taking over on the Tuesday when Ball was also ill. Evans returned on 17 April, revealing he had been suffering from rhinitis.

== See also ==
- Chris Evans Drivetime
- Wake Up to Wogan
