= Too Much TV =

- Presented by: Aled Jones; Sara Cox; Emma Bunton; Rufus Hound
- Country of origin: United Kingdom
- Original language: English
- No. of series: 1
- No. of episodes: 25

Production
- Executive producer: Leon Wilde
- Producers: Kerry Hunt; Sarah Timbury; Chris Weller
- Production location: Princess Studios
- Camera setup: Multi-camera
- Running time: 30 minutes

Original release
- Network: BBC Two
- Release: 29 February – 1 April 2016

Too Much TV is a British television programme, that has aired on BBC Two between 29 February and 1 April 2016. It was broadcast on weeknights at 6:30 pm and is presented by Emma Bunton, Aled Jones, Sara Cox and Rufus Hound.

== Presenters ==
The show is presented by Spice Girls member and radio DJ Emma Bunton, singer and broadcaster Aled Jones, radio and television presenter Sara Cox and comedian and actor Rufus Hound. The four presenters host the show in-rotation.

The show features a number of roving reporters including Susan Calman and Funmbi Omotayo.

Presenter	Show Presenting	Total
Aled Jones	1, 3–5, 9–15, 18–22, 24, 25	18
Sara Cox	1–2, 4–5, 8–9, 11, 13, 16–18, 20–21, 23, 25	15
Emma Bunton	2–3, 6–7, 10, 12, 14–17, 19, 22–24	14
Rufus Hound	6–8	3

== Episodes ==
Episode	Air Date	Presenters	Guests	Notes
1	29 February 2016	Aled Jones & Sara Cox	Tyger Drew-Honey & Carol Kirkwood	Aled and Sara First presenting episode
2	1 March 2016	Sara Cox & Emma Bunton	Giles Coren & Giovanni Pernice	Emma's First presenting episode
3	2 March 2016	Aled Jones & Emma Bunton	Daniel Hopwood, Sophie Robinson & Eddie Izzard	
4	3 March 2016	Aled Jones & Sara Cox	Chelsee Healey	
5	4 March 2016	Aled Jones & Sara Cox	Alistair Petrie & Alison O'Donnell	Friday quiz won by Sara Cox
6	7 March 2016	Rufus Hound & Emma Bunton	Joivan Wade & Rufus Jones	Rufus First Presenting episode
7	8 March 2016	Rufus Hound & Emma Bunton	Jemma Redgrave	
8	9 March 2016	Rufus Hound & Sara Cox	Calum Callaghan	
9	10 March 2016	Aled Jones & Sara Cox	Matthew Chambers	
10	11 March 2016	Aled Jones & Emma Bunton	Tim Vine & Joe and Jake	Friday quiz won by Aled Jones
11	14 March 2016	Aled Jones & Sara Cox	Liz Carr & Vicki Michelle	
12	15 March 2016	Aled Jones & Emma Bunton	Robert Emms & Brian Conley	
13	16 March 2016	Aled Jones & Sara Cox	Tom Heap, Funmbi Omotayo & Iwan Thomas	
14	17 March 2016	Aled Jones & Emma Bunton	Jeremy Vine & Jamie Raven	
15	18 March 2016	Aled Jones & Emma Bunton	Nikesh Patel & Aysha Kala	Friday quiz won by Emma Bunton
16	21 March 2016	Sara Cox & Emma Bunton		
17	22 March 2016	Sara Cox & Emma Bunton		Emma Was in for Aled who was ill
18	23 March 2016	Aled Jones & Sara Cox		
19	24 March 2016	Aled Jones & Emma Bunton		
20	25 March 2016	Aled Jones & Sara Cox		
21	28 March 2016	Aled Jones & Sara Cox	The Lancashire Hotpots	
22	29 March 2016	Aled Jones & Emma Bunton		
23	30 March 2016	Sara Cox & Emma Bunton		
24	31 March 2016	Aled Jones & Emma Bunton	Elaine C. Smith	Tribute made to Ronnie Corbett
25	1 April 2016	Aled Jones & Sara Cox	Keith Barry	
