= Mark Goodier =

British radio disc jockey (born 1961)

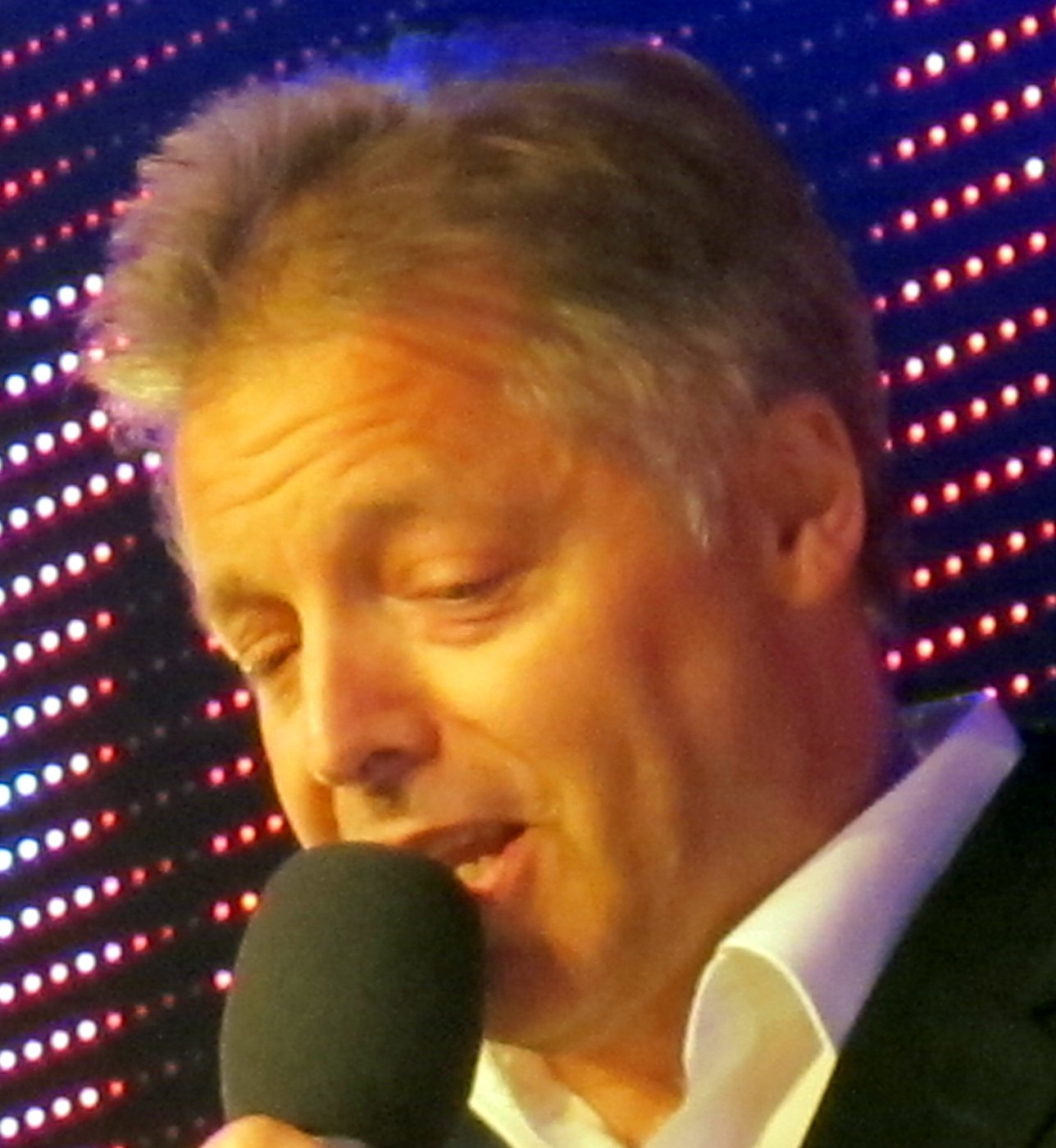
- Goodier in July 2011
- Born: 9 June 1961 (age 65); Salisbury, Southern Rhodesia (now Harare, Zimbabwe)
- Occupations: Broadcaster; DJ; voice artist
- Years active: 1971–present
- Known for: BBC Radio 1's UK Top 40 (1990–1992, 1995–2002); The Evening Session (1990–1993); Top of the Pops (1988–1991, 1994–1996); Now That's What I Call Music! (UK TV advert); Pick of the Pops (2016, 2018, 2024–present)
- Spouse: Jacqueline Goodier (m. 1987)
- Children: 3

Mark Goodier (born 9 June 1961) is a British radio disc jockey and broadcaster. He presented on BBC Radio 1 between 1987 and 2002 and had two spells presenting the station's Top 40 singles chart, from September 1990 to March 1992 and again from April 1995 until November 2002, becoming the show's longest serving presenter. He also had a stint on the Radio 1 Breakfast Show during 1993.

Goodier has also presented shows on BBC Radio 2, Classic FM, Greatest Hits Radio, Smooth Radio and Real Radio, and appeared on BBC television as a recurring presenter of Top of the Pops between 1988 and 1996.

On 17 January 2023, Goodier announced that he was to be replaced on Greatest Hits Radio's weekday morning show by Ken Bruce, who joined the station from BBC Radio 2. Bruce announced his departure from Radio 2 on the same day. Goodier moved to weekend mornings in April, replacing Pat Sharp who left the station. Goodier twice returned to the weekday mid-morning slot in August 2023 and March 2024 to provide holiday cover for Bruce. On 15 April 2024, it was announced that he would be leaving Greatest Hits Radio and going back to Radio 2 to take over Pick of the Pops from 6 July 2024.

Goodier has also been covering Breakfast, Mid Mornings, and Afternoons from 2025 continued in 2026 on BBC Radio 2 – as of June 2026, he is on rotation covering Drivetime until the station announces Sara Cox's replacement, as it was announced Cox is going to be the new host of The Radio 2 Breakfast Show, which began on 6 July 2026.

== Early life and career ==
Goodier was born in Salisbury, Southern Rhodesia (now Zimbabwe). His family moved to Llanfairfechan, Wales, shortly after he was born, eventually settling in Edinburgh, Scotland, when he was 8 years old. He was educated at George Heriot's School, in Edinburgh. He became a mobile DJ in Edinburgh and then joined a local Free Radio Station (Telstar) where his radio career began. Afterwards he went on to join the local stations Radio Forth and Radio Tay at the age of 19 taking over the Radio Tay Breakfast Beat from Gerry Quinn After progressing through several jobs at stations in Scotland including Radio Clyde in Glasgow and at Metro Radio in the North East of England, he joined BBC Radio 1 in late 1987, with a two-hour Saturday night show.

== BBC Radio 1 ==
Goodier co-presented Radio 1's Weekend Breakfast Show with Liz Kershaw and Sybil Ruscoe (Kershaw's stand-in) from October 1988 to March 1989. In April 1989, he took over the Monday-Thursday drivetime slot. Goodier created The Evening Session and hosted it between 1990 and 1993. During this period, he also presented the British Top 40 chart countdown on Sunday evenings from 30 September 1990 and was also an established host on Top of the Pops, along with several of his BBC Radio 1 colleagues. The very first Top 40 he presented was on 21 February 1988.

Bands and artists recorded sessions for Goodier at the BBC's Maida Vale Studios, some of which were commercially released. In 1992, Nirvana's "odds-and-sods" release, Incesticide, featured several songs recorded for Goodier's BBC show. The album reached the top 40 on both sides of the Atlantic and achieved Platinum status in America. A further session recording was "Something in the Way", released on the 2011 edition of Nevermind.

When Simon Mayo left Radio 1 Breakfast in 1993, Radio 1 controller Matthew Bannister approached Steve Wright to take over the slot. Wright said that he would not do so immediately, and Bannister asked Goodier to host for four months in late 1993. He then shifted to afternoons, then back to his old drivetime slot in late 1994. On 23 April 1995, he returned to the chart show, after Bruno Brookes left the station.

In 1997, Goodier took on a Saturday and Sunday morning slot after quitting daily radio to establish his production company, WiseBuddah. He spent his final two years at Radio 1 only presenting the Top 40 show, before leaving the station entirely in 2002 owing to falling audiences and BBC bosses considering him "too old for the job." Goodier's final show was broadcast on 17 November that year, which also marked the 50th anniversary of the UK Singles Chart. In addition to this, from 2001 Goodier also stood in for presenters on BBC Radio 2 when taking their holiday.

== Career after BBC Radio 1 ==
After permanently leaving BBC Radio 1, Goodier presented the EMAP-produced Smash Hits Chart, which competed with Radio 1's official chart and Hit40UK. The Smash Hits Chart finished in March 2006, when EMAP also began to broadcast the Hit40UK chart show across their Big City Network of stations. He also presented the Classical Chart for Classic FM.

On 1 April 2006, his new Real Top 40 shows began on the Real Radio network in Scotland, Wales and Yorkshire. Every show reflected sales and airplay for that area.

Goodier is featured in a podcast promoting the Top of the Pops boxset alongside Miles Leonard, Malcolm McLaren and David Hepworth.

In March 2007, Goodier joined the newly relaunched Smooth Radio in London, as presenter of the weekday mid-morning show from 10 am to 1 pm, his first daily show in a decade, and subsequently this show was networked to other Smooth stations and then on the national Smooth service. He left the station in December 2012 to focus on running his Wisebuddah company.

Goodier again became a frequent stand-in on BBC Radio 2 when regular presenters were on leave. From 27 February to 2 July 2016 he presented Pick of the Pops on a temporary basis following the departure of Tony Blackburn, before Paul Gambaccini took over as the permanent presenter. On 15 April 2024, it was announced that Goodier would return to Radio 2 to host POTP from 6 July, following the death of Steve Wright, becoming his first ever permanent programme for Radio 2.

After Zoe Ball’s departure from the Radio 2 Breakfast show in December 2024, Goodier began standing in for the most popular radio show in the country. His final stand-in before Scott Mills took over on a permanent basis was on Friday 24 January 2025.

In addition, he is a voiceover artist for television adverts which promote new compact disc-formatted albums, in particular the Now That's What I Call Music! UK series, of which he has been "the voice" since Now 21 in early 1992. Goodier has also hosted the annual Blackpool Illuminations Switch on Concert for two years on Real Radio and Smooth Radio. In June 2012, Goodier joined Spectrum FM, the English language music station in the Costa del Sol, Spain, to present a weekly Saturday morning show.

Goodier is a Fellow of The Radio Academy.

On 17 November 2016, Goodier suffered a stroke aged 55, which prevented him from voicing the television adverts for Now That's What I Call Music! 95 (UK), which were instead voiced by Matt Edmondson.

Media offices
Preceded by Bruno Brookes	BBC Radio 1 chart show presenter 30 September 1990 – 1 March 1992	Succeeded by Tommy Vance
Preceded by Simon Mayo	BBC Radio 1 Breakfast Show Presenter; 1993	Succeeded by Steve Wright
Preceded by Bruno Brookes	BBC Radio 1 chart show presenter 23 April 1995 – 17 November 2002	Succeeded by Various presenters
