= Hotel of Mum and Dad =

British factual television series

- Genre: Factual
- Directed by: Alistair Smith (Series 1); Mel Beer (Series 1); Tom Jackson (Series 2)
- Narrated by: Nick Grimshaw
- Composer: Dobs Vye
- Country of origin: United Kingdom
- Original language: English
- No. of series: 2
- No. of episodes: 12

Production
- Executive producers: Kat Lennox (Series 1-2); Hannah Wyatt (Series 1)
- Producer: Sarah Ladbury
- Running time: 60 minutes
- Production company: Mentorn Media

Original release
- Network: BBC Three
- Release: 3 October 2013 – 7 November 2014

Hotel of Mum and Dad is a British factual television series that was first broadcast on BBC Three starting on 3 October 2013. The series shows young couples who live at one of their parents' homes moving out together for the first time. The BBC announced the commissioning of a second series on 13 February 2014, and commenced airing it on 29 September 2014.

== Production ==
The executive producers are Kat Lennox and Hannah Wyatt and the series producer is Sarah Ladbury. The production company is Mentorn Media and the distributor is Passion Distribution. The first series featured couples in several towns in the United Kingdom, including Stevenage and Swansea.

The second series featured six one-hour-length episodes, set in the United Kingdom. These episodes aired on both BBC Three and BBC Three HD television channels. Lennox remained as executive producer, whilst Tom Jackson directed, and Grimshaw continued his role as narrator.

== Reception ==
John Crace of The Guardian said the series was "missing the important questions". Time Out's Gabriel Tate gave it two stars out of five and called the format "stifling".
