= Jonny Saunders =

British radio sports reporter (born 1975)

- Born: 31 March 1975 (age 51)
- Education: Bradfield College, Berkshire
- Alma mater: Collingwood College, Durham University
- Years active: 1998–2011
- Family: Chris Saunders (father)

Jonny Saunders (born 31 March 1975) is a British former radio sports reporter, presenter and commentator. He worked for the BBC and featured on Radios 1, 2, 4, 5 live and 6 Music. He was the drivetime and later morning sports presenter on BBC Radio 2, featuring on The Chris Evans Breakfast Show and Chris Evans Drivetime until leaving on 8 July 2011, to become a teacher.

== Early life and education ==
Saunders was educated at Bradfield College, a boarding independent school in the small village of Bradfield in Berkshire, followed by Durham University from 1994 to 1997, and was at Collingwood College, where he kept goal for the college football team. He appeared as part of the Durham Revue alongside James Cary and comic Tim FitzHigham.

== Radio career ==
Saunders' radio career started on the University Radio Station Purple Radio then known as "Purple FM 105.8" where alongside other members of the Durham Revue he presented the Saturday morning Brenda Smedley Show from 10 am to noon.

He began his professional career as a sports broadcaster at London's Capital Radio, where he worked from 1998 to 1999. In September 1999 he moved to the BBC, where he worked until mid 2011. Saunders was mysteriously absent from The Chris Evans Breakfast Show from 14 to 16 June 2011. It was revealed on Friday 17 June that he had been away revising for and taking an Open University exam in English Literature as he would be leaving the show on 8 July 2011 to become a teacher.

Saunders has also presented coverage of Reading F.C. on BBC Radio Berkshire on Saturdays from 1 pm.

== Personal life ==
Saunders lives at Bradfield College in Berkshire as a housemaster for Stone House. In 2004 he was travelling on the train involved in the Ufton Nervet rail crash.
