= Radio 1 Breakfast =

British national radio show

The Radio 1 Breakfast Show
- Other names: Daily Disc Delivery (1967-1968); Mike Smith's Breakfast Show (1986-1988); Steve Wright in the Morning (1994-1995); The Radio 1 Breakfast Show with Sara Cox (2000-2003); The Chris Moyles Show (2004-2012); The Radio 1 Breakfast Show with Nick Grimshaw (2012-2018); Radio 1 Breakfast with Greg James (2018-present)
- Genre: Music, chat
- Running time: 210 minutes (7:00 am – 10:30 am)
- Country of origin: United Kingdom
- Language: English
- Home station: BBC Radio 1
- Hosted by: Greg James
- Starring: Calum Leslie
- Produced by: Amy Johnson; Thomas Gane; Helena Webb; Vinuri Perera
- Recording studio: Studio 82A, Broadcasting House, London
- Original release: 30 September 1967
- Audio format: Stereophonic sound
- Website: Radio 1 Breakfast with Greg James
- Podcast: Radio 1's All Day Breakfast with Greg James

Radio 1 Breakfast, also known as The Radio 1 Breakfast Show, is BBC Radio 1's flagship morning show currently hosted by Greg James and broadcast since its launch on 30 September 1967.

The show ran six days a week until February 1968 (see BBC Genome Project), then five days a week until June 2018, when the Friday show was dropped and incorporated into the station's weekend schedule, hosted by former Weekend Breakfast hosts Matt Edmondson & Mollie King. In January 2021, the show returned to broadcasting five days per week.

== History ==
The first breakfast show presenter was Tony Blackburn, who spoke the first words on Radio 1 and remained in the slot for nearly six years. Other DJs who have hosted the breakfast show for more than five years are current host Greg James and former hosts Nick Grimshaw, Mike Read, Simon Mayo, and Chris Moyles. Moyles was the longest-serving Radio 1 breakfast show presenter, having hosted Radio 1's The Chris Moyles Show for eight years from 2004 to 2012.

- Data supplied by the BBC Genome Project.

No	Presenter	From	To	Duration
1	Tony Blackburn	30 September 1967	1 June 1973	5 years, 244 days
2	Noel Edmonds	4 June 1973	28 April 1978	4 years, 328 days
3	Dave Lee Travis	2 May 1978	2 January 1981	2 years, 245 days
4	Mike Read	5 January 1981	18 April 1986	5 years, 103 days
5	Mike Smith	5 May 1986	17 May 1988	2 years, 12 days
6	Simon Mayo	23 May 1988	3 September 1993	5 years, 103 days
7	Mark Goodier	6 September 1993	24 December 1993	109 days
8	Steve Wright	10 January 1994	21 April 1995	1 year, 101 days
9	Chris Evans	24 April 1995	31 January 1997	1 year, 282 days
10	Mark and Lard	17 February 1997	10 October 1997	235 days
11	Zoe Ball (Note: Kevin Greening co-hosted alongside Zoe Ball from 13 October 1997 to 25 September 1998.)	13 October 1997	10 March 2000	2 years, 149 days
12	Sara Cox	3 April 2000	19 December 2003	3 years, 260 days
13	Chris Moyles	5 January 2004	14 September 2012	8 years, 253 days
14	Nick Grimshaw	24 September 2012	9 August 2018	5 years, 319 days
15	Greg James	20 August 2018	present	8 years, 8 days

=== Nick Grimshaw (2012–2018) ===
Nick Grimshaw replaced Moyles as host of the breakfast show on 24 September 2012. Features included Call or Delete, a game carried on from his previous show on Radio 1, where celebrity guests chose to either prank call a contact on their phone or delete their number altogether. Other segments included The Nixtape, which saw Grimshaw select 30 minutes of party-oriented music before a DJ came in to mix listener requests to close the week on Friday mornings, Happy Monday, a half-hour of uplifting songs on Monday mornings, Showquizness, an irreverent daily quiz based around pop culture, Happy Hardcore FM, which saw listeners phone into the show to scream over happy hardcore beats, and the daily Waking Up Song, which featured celebrities encouraging listeners to get out of bed to the sound of Pharoahe Monch. Grimshaw's incarnation of the breakfast show received strong critical reviews, but polarised public opinion, which was reflected in the show's often fluctuating listening figures – in February 2015, the show had 5.9 million listeners, with a small increase in listenership of 100,000. On 26 October 2017, it was reported that the show recorded 4.93 million weekly listeners between July and September – down from 5.5 million last quarter, a record low. The Newsbeat news and sport bulletins were presented by Tina Daheley at 6:30, 7:00, 7:30, 8:00, 8:30 and 9:30; there was also entertainment news from Sinead Garven at approximately 7:45 each morning.

=== Greg James (2018–present) ===
Greg James replaced Grimshaw as host of the breakfast show on 20 August 2018. Roisin Hastie read the bulletins for Newsbeat every half-hour except at 09:00 until her departure from the show in 2022 for maternity leave, when she was replaced by Calum Leslie. Features include Yesterday's Quiz and the Ten Minute Takeover, alongside Is It Just Us and Unpopular Opinions.

In March 2020, at the start of the COVID-19 pandemic, Radio 1 Breakfast was moved to 7am until 11am. Adele Roberts' Early Breakfast Show was extended by thirty minutes until 7am. Scott Mills, Chris Stark and Clara Amfo rotated their shows every week between 11am and 3pm and Nick Grimshaw started his show at the earlier time of 3pm. The measures took place in order to help BBC Radio 1 promote social distancing and to limit the number of staff allowed in the studio. The show was then reduced to 3 hours (i.e. 7am until 10am) since 29 June 2020, in which 10am until 11am was allocated for Radio 1 Anthems, also with Greg James. The changes took place until 31 August 2020.

Starting 1 September 2020, the schedule reverted to its 3 hours 30 minutes length, but running from 7am until 10:30am, instead of 6:30am until 10am as previously. In November 2020, Radio 1 announced that James's Breakfast show be broadcast five days a week from the start of January 2021. In July 2023, the show aired between 7:30-11:00 except for Friday when it was 7:00-10:30. This returned to 7:00-10:30 Monday-Friday in September 2023. Since July 2024, the show has been broadcast for four hours during every summer break, from 7:00 am to 11:00 am.

== Stand-ins ==
Holiday cover is usually provided by another prominent member of the Radio 1 presenting team – the job rarely goes to an outsider or to a former presenter, although in 1985, Noel Edmonds covered the programme for two weeks when Mike Read was on holiday. Additionally, transitions between regular hosts have often been bridged by stand-ins. These have been:

- Adrian John covered the period between Mike Read's departure and Mike Smith's arrival in April 1986.
- Mark Goodier covered the period between Mike Smith's departure and Simon Mayo's arrival in May 1988.
- Bruno Brookes covered the period between Mark Goodier's departure and Steve Wright's arrival in January 1994.
- Simon Mayo covered the period between Chris Evans's departure and the arrival of Mark Radcliffe and Marc Riley in February 1997.
- Scott Mills covered the period between Zoe Ball's departure and Sara Cox's arrival in March 2000, and again in December 2003 (sharing with Emma B) preceding Sara Cox's departure and Chris Moyles' arrival, and once again in September 2012 after Chris Moyles's departure and before Nick Grimshaw's arrival. He most recently covered in August 2018 in the transition period between the tenures of Nick Grimshaw's departure and Greg James's arrival.

=== Current cover presenters ===
- Matt Edmondson
- Mollie King (co-hosts with Edmondson)
- Dean McCullough
- Sam MacGregor
- Danni Diston

=== Occasional cover presenters ===
- Arielle Free
- Vick Hope
- Katie Thistleton
- Danny Mylo
- Rosie Madison (co-hosts with Mylo)
- Jeremiah Asiamah (co-hosts with Edmondson)
- Jamie Laing (co-hosts with Edmondson)

=== Previous cover presenters ===
- Vernon Kay
- Dev
- Huw Stephens
- Sara Cox
- Kevin Greening
- Chris Moyles
- Scott Mills and Chris Stark
- Adele Roberts
- Jordan North
- Rob Gorman

== See also ==
- Radio 1's Weekend Breakfast Show
- The Radio 2 Breakfast Show
- Timeline of breakfast radio programmes in the UK
