= Richie Anderson (presenter) =

BBC TV and radio personality

- Born: Richie Stephen Anderson; 13 October 1987 (age 38); Smethwick, West Midlands, England
- Occupations: Television and radio personality
- Years active: 2015–present
- Partner: Dean Eagles (2012–present)

Richie Stephen Anderson (born 13 October 1987) is a TV and radio personality who works for the BBC. He is a former Sunday League footballer who played for Coombs Wood F.C..

Anderson currently presents the travel reports on weekday afternoons on BBC Radio 2. In 2022, he participated in series 20 of Strictly Come Dancing.

== BBC Radio WM ==
He presented his own show on BBC Radio WM, where he started his radio career, on Saturdays between August 2015 and March 2020. He had previously stood in for other presenters during early 2015. Before becoming a presenter, Anderson was a reporter for BBC WM during their football segments on matchdays. Dubbed "Roaming Richie", he would interview fans before and after matches. He became renowned during this period for his vox pop 'man on the street' style of interviewing.

== BBC Radio 2 ==
In January 2019, Anderson became the weekday mornings travel news reporter on BBC Radio 2 during The Radio 2 Breakfast Show and the mid-morning show. He replaced Rachel Horne who moved to Virgin Radio. Anderson also occasionally presents programmes on Bank Holidays for Radio 2. During the 2023 series of Strictly Come Dancing, Anderson hosted the last half-hour of Claudia Winkleman's Saturday show to feature songs from that evening's Strictly Come Dancing On 19 December 2024, Anderson informed listeners that he would be moving to presenting the travel news on weekday afternoons replacing Bobbie Pryor except on Friday. Ellie Brennan replaced Richie on mornings.

Anderson has also commentated the semi-finals of the 2024 Eurovision Song Contest for BBC Radio 2.

== Television ==
Anderson occasionally reports on various topics for The One Show on BBC One. Richie has also contributed as a guest reviewer on Strictly Come Dancing: It Takes Two on BBC Two and provided off-screen commentary for the Turquoise Carpet event for the Eurovision Song Contest 2023 in Liverpool.

It was also announced, on the 7th August 2025, that Anderson will be a new host on Escape to the Country, from their upcoming series.

== Personal life ==
In 2018, Anderson came out as gay to his teammates after playing a game of football, which was documented as part of a film for The One Show which highlighted the pressures of homophobia in the sport. He is a supporter of West Bromwich Albion.

In 2020, Anderson, along with fellow Radio 2 presenters Jo Whiley and Kate Bottley, participated in three triathlons in three days to raise money for Sport Relief as part of their Dare To Tri campaign.
