= Radio 1's Weekend Breakfast Show =

British national radio show

- Other names: Weekend Breakfast with Emil Franchi
- Genre: Music, chat
- Running time: 210 minutes (7:00 am – 10:30 am)
- Country of origin: United Kingdom
- Language: English
- Home station: BBC Radio 1
- Hosted by: Emil Franchi
- Recording studio: Studio 82Mills, Broadcasting House, London (2018–2023); Studio 1A, BBC Cymru Wales New Broadcasting House, Cardiff (2023–2025); BBC Dock House, MediaCityUK, Salford (2025–present)
- Audio format: Stereophonic sound
- Website: Radio 1 Weekend Breakfast with Emil Franchi

Radio 1's Weekend Breakfast Show is a radio show that is broadcast on BBC Radio 1 on weekends. It's currently hosted by Emil Franchi from MediaCity in Salford.

Weekend Breakfast was an extension of Radio 1 Breakfast which, before June 2018, aired on weekdays from 6:30 to 10am, while the weekend show aired on Saturdays and Sundays. In June 2018, Radio 1 decided to incorporate the Friday breakfast show into the station's weekend schedule, using the weekend presenters. In November 2020, the BBC announced changes to the Radio 1 schedules, meaning Matt Edmondson and Mollie King would move from weekend breakfast to weekend afternoons to replace Dev, who left the station in December 2020, and that the weekend breakfast show would only be broadcast on weekends. As of January 2021, they started airing on Fridays as well.

== History ==
Weekend breakfast programming on Radio 1 was originally a continuation of Junior Choice, which had been broadcast on the BBC Light Programme (originally as Children's Favourites) since 1954. However, by the early 1980s this was seen as old fashioned and the Junior Choice title was dropped in the early months of 1982, with the programme renamed as Tony Blackburn's Saturday/Sunday Show. Children's requests were finally dropped in October 1984 when a new weekend breakfast show was launched. Peter Powell was the first presenter and he was followed by, among others, Mark Goodier, Sybil Ruscoe, Bruno Brookes, Liz Kershaw, Gary Davies, Kevin Greening, Clive Warren, and Dave Pearce. In the late 1990s and early 2000s, the weekend breakfast show was split into two different shows until on 20 September 2003, they were merged.

List of Radio 1 Weekend Breakfast Presenters
| No | Presenter | From | To | Duration |
|---|---|---|---|---|
| 1 | Spoony | 20 September 2003 | 17 September 2006 | 2 years, 362 days |
| 2 | Fearne Cotton and Reggie Yates | 23 September 2006 | 7 October 2007 | 1 year, 14 days |
| 3 | Nihal | 13 October 2007 | 31 August 2008 | 323 days |
| 4 | Chappers and Dave (Interim) | 6 September 2008 | 19 October 2008 | 43 days |
| 5 | Nick Grimshaw | 25 October 2008 | 24 May 2009 | 211 days |
| 6 | Chappers and Dave (Interim) | 30 May 2009 | 28 June 2009 | 29 days |
| 7 | Dev | 4 July 2009 | 20 September 2009 | 78 days |
| 8 | Edith Bowman | 26 September 2009 | 1 April 2012 | 2 years, 188 days |
| 9 | Gemma Cairney | 7 April 2012 | 23 March 2014 | 1 year, 350 days |
| 10 | Dev (Note: Alice Levine co-hosted alongside Dev from 17 March to 11 November 2018.) | 29 March 2014 | 11 November 2018 | 4 years, 227 days |
| 11 | Matt Edmondson and Mollie King | 16 November 2018 | 3 January 2021 | 2 years, 48 days |
| 12 | Adele Roberts | 9 January 2021 | 20 May 2023 | 2 years, 131 days |
| 13 | Ore Olukoga (Interim) | 21 May 2023 | 3 September 2023 | 105 days |
| 14 | Sam McGregor and Danni Diston | 9 September 2023 | 14 December 2024 | 1 year, 96 days |
| 15 | James Cusack | 11 January 2025 | 5 September 2026 | 1 year, 237 days |
| 16 | Emil Franchi | 12 September 2026 | present | 66 days |

=== Dev and Alice Levine (March - November 2018) ===
On 17 January 2018, BBC Radio 1 announced that Alice Levine would be shifted from the weekend afternoon slot (1-4pm) to co-host with Dev on the Weekend Breakfast slot. Matt Edmondson filled Levine's afternoon slot. The show was then increased to three days (Friday to Sundays).

=== Matt Edmondson and Mollie King (November 2018 - January 2021) ===
On 26 October 2018, BBC Radio 1 announced that Matt Edmondson and Mollie King would join the Radio 1's Weekend Breakfast Show, swapping with Dev and Alice Levine. The schedule change may have been sparked by Charlie Sloth's unexpected departure from Radio 1 in October 2018. The changes took into place on 16 November 2018. The first song of the show was Higher from The Saturdays and Flo Rida, as they called Greg James (Radio 1 Breakfast presenter) to pick it.

== Show Length ==
At the beginning, the show had a length of 3 hours, from 7-10am. Beginning in September 2014, the show was then increased to 4 hours (6-10am) due to changes in the late night and early morning schedule.

On 5 September 2019, the early morning schedule changed again; Arielle Free hosted the weekend early breakfast slot, and Mollie King hosted a new show called "Radio 1's Best New Pop with Mollie King" on Friday 6-6:30 am. This resulted in the show length reducing to 3 hours 30 minutes (6:30 - 10am) for Fridays; and 3 hours (7-10am) for Saturdays and Sundays.

Due to the COVID-19 pandemic, the show was adjusted to 7-11am, inclusive of Radio 1 Anthems at the final hour of the show. The adjustment was to help Radio 1 promote social distancing and to limit the number of staff allowed in the studio. The show was then moved to 7-10:30am in the September 2020 adjustments.
