= Chris Saunders (headmaster) =

English cricketer and headmaster (born 1940)

Personal information
- Full name: Christopher John Saunders
- Born: 7 May 1940 (age 86); West Worthing, Sussex, England
- Batting: Right-handed
- Role: Wicket-keeper
- Relatives: Jonny Saunders (son)

Domestic team information
- Years: Team
- 1962–1963: Cambridge University
- 1964: Oxford University
- 1971: Berkshire

Career statistics
Competition	First-class
Matches	12
Runs scored	69
Batting average	11.50
100s/50s	0/0
Top score	21
Balls bowled	0
Wickets	–
Bowling average	–
5 wickets in innings	–
10 wickets in match	–
Best bowling	–
Catches/stumpings	10/3
- Source: Cricinfo, 22 October 2016

Christopher John Saunders (born 7 May 1940) is a former headmaster of Eastbourne College and Lancing College, and a first-class cricketer who played for Cambridge University and Oxford University.

== Early life and education ==
Christopher John Saunders was born on 7 May 1940 in West Worthing, Sussex, England.

He attended Lancing College, a public school in West Sussex, followed by Fitzwilliam College, Cambridge. He then studied for a Postgraduate Certificate in Education at Wadham College, Oxford.

== Career ==
=== Cricket ===
Saunders played for the First XI at Lancing College, and was selected to keep wicket for the Southern Schools against The Rest in their annual match at Lord's in 1958 and 1959.

He kept wicket for Cambridge University's cricket team in seven matches in 1962 and one match in 1963 without earning a blue. He also played a match against Cambridge University in 1963, captaining Col. L. C. Stevens' XI in a match that was scheduled and played as a first-class match but later had its status rescinded by the Marylebone Cricket Club (MCC).

At Oxford University, late in the 1964 season he took over the wicket-keeping duties for the university team, and played in four matches, including the annual University Match against Cambridge, thus gaining his cricket blue at Oxford. He was a neat keeper who conceded few byes (none at all in the University Match), but his batting was unproductive and he usually went in at number 10 or 11.

He appeared in three Minor Counties Championship matches for Berkshire in 1971.

=== Teaching ===
Saunders taught at Bradfield College in Berkshire, where he became a housemaster, before taking up the position of headmaster at Eastbourne College in Sussex in 1981. He later moved to Lancing College in Sussex, serving as headmaster from 1993 to 1998.

He was the chairman of the Independent Schools Football Association from 1982 to 2003, greatly expanding the scope of its activities.

== Recognition ==
Since his retirement from the position, the award for the play of the match in the ISFA final has been awarded in his honour: the Chris Saunders Golden Moment.

He is a Life Vice-President of The Football Association.

== Personal life ==
In an after-dinner speech to the Worshipful Company of Feltmakers in 2013 Saunders urged his audience to "avoid being like a thrombosis – a bloody clot that circulates around the system", and to remain active.

His son Jonny is a former radio presenter who is now, as his father was, a housemaster at Bradfield College.
