= Sally Boazman =

British journalist (born 1949)

- Born: 13 September 1957 (age 69)
- Occupation: Radio traffic news reporter
- Children: 1

Sally Boazman (born 13 September 1957) is a British radio traffic news reporter on the national radio station BBC Radio 2. Her reporting introduced live reports from motorists on mobile phones and lorry drivers on CB radio.

== Career ==
Following a brief foray into acting, Boazman took a post in the current affairs department of LWT where she worked as a secretary for the future Director-General of the BBC Greg Dyke. After later working as a traffic news announcer for the Automobile Association she went on to present traffic reports for a number of local radio stations before moving to Classic FM. After a brief time providing voiceover for Eurotrash (TV series) (C4), her first presenting role was for the British Forces Broadcasting Service after which she worked for the BBC World Service and commercial radio. She spent some time away from broadcasting following the birth of her son, Harry, but returned later to become Chief Travel Reporter for BBC Radio London.

She joined BBC Radio 2 as the network's first official travel news presenter in 1998, presenting travel updates during the weekday afternoons. She has worked alongside Johnnie Walker, later Chris Evans and Simon Mayo on their respective Drivetime shows, Steve Wright during the afternoon, and Jeremy Vine at lunchtime. Boazman now provides traffic news reports on weekends on BBC Radio 2 with Orna Merchant normally doing the same. In 2007, Boazman was described by Autotrader UK as the "sexiest voice on the radio" and a national treasure who changed the way traffic reporting was done. Her fans have named a thoroughbred race horse after her, as well as lorry trucks.

On 7 December 2023, Boazman was announced as the 2023 recipient of the Special Contribution to Motoring Award from the Guild of Motor Writers.

In October 2025, Boazman was a competitor on the BBC's The Weakest Link "Radio 2 Special".

== Books, records, and activities ==
In 2003 she narrated the poem Crawl of The Light Brigade for the CD recording Guide Cats for the Blind. In 2007 she wrote the book The Sally Traffic Handbook and narrated a CD for the Highways Agency called Hear When the Going's Good, providing advice to lorry drivers.

TomTom navigation has a Sally Traffic voice available for its GPS units. Proceeds from purchase of the voice driving set go to the charity BBC Children in Need.

From 10 to 19 November 2007, she cycled across 400 kilometres (250 mi) of Kenya's Rift Valley to support charity Transaid. In 2009 she presented the Gold level Sony Radio Academy Award for drivetime entertainment to her fellow broadcaster Chris Evans, while in 2007 the Gold level Entertainment award honoured the Chris Evans Drivetime show and staff, of which Boazman was part. She also won the Truck & Driver Driver's Choice award for Best Traffic Information in 2009.

On 29 October 2011, she presented The Road to Nowhere for BBC One in London and South East England, a documentary celebrating the 25th anniversary of the M25. The programme sees Boazman journeying around the motorway and examining its economic and environmental impact, as well as other ways it has changed Britain's society.

== Personal life ==
She lives in Ipswich with her son Harry (born 1987), who is a musician, after living in Addlestone for a while. She was a regular participant at Truckfest, appearing in every event between 2002 and 2006.
