= Rachel Horne =

Northern Irish journalist

- Born: Rachel Gibson; County Fermanagh, Northern Ireland
- Occupations: Journalist, television presenter
- Notable credit(s): Newsround; BBC News; Working Lunch
- Spouse: Alex Horne (m. 2005)
- Children: 3

Rachel Horne (née Gibson) is a Northern Irish newsreader and journalist. She presented the BBC children's news programme Newsround from 2002 until 2006. She also presented BBC News' business bulletins on the BBC News Channel and travel news on weekday mornings on BBC Radio 2 in March to December 2018. She joined Virgin Radio UK as a breakfast show newsreader in January 2019. She has been married to comedian Alex Horne since 2005.

== Early life ==
Rachel Gibson was born in County Fermanagh, Northern Ireland. She grew up in Lisnaskea in County Fermanagh in Ulster, on the shores of Lough Erne. She has an older sister and brother. Her maternal uncle was The Most Rev. Dr Edward Daly (1933-2016), who served as the Lord Bishop of Derry from 1974 until 1993.

At the age of 18, Horne went travelling and taught English in Vietnam. After reading Law and Theology at Sidney Sussex College, Cambridge, she studied for a postgraduate degree in Broadcast Journalism at City, University of London.

== Career ==
Horne has worked for BBC productions Breakfast with Frost, BBC Radio 5 Live and Newsbeat on BBC Radio 1. She later worked for BBC Essex on their Breakfast programme as a reporter.

=== Newsround ===
Horne joined CBBC's flagship news programme, Newsround in December 2002. Alongside Lizzie Greenwood-Hughes, Thalia Pellegrini and Adam Fleming, Horne was part of the bulletin team and the main reporter. Initially, Horne also presented spin-off programme, Newsround Showbiz until its axe in 2005 due to poor ratings. Horne left Newsround in 2006.

=== Business News ===
Following her departure from Newsround, Horne joined BBC Two's flagship business programme Working Lunch. Horne was a member of the team as its business reporter from May 2006. Horne remained on the programme until its relaunch in 2008.

After Working Lunch, Horne joined the BBC News Channel's Business News team in 2009. Horne became a regular presenter, often presenting the afternoon and evening shift. Horne presented Monday to Thursday throughout the afternoon and evening after returning from maternity leave in 2012.

It was announced in 2012 that the BBC News Channel's business bulletins would be axed as part of the Delivering Quality First scheme. Horne left the channel for a time after the move to New Broadcasting house. Horne reappeared presenting the business on the BBC News Channel during 2015 and presented regularly on Tuesdays, Wednesdays and Fridays.

=== Radio ===
Horne joined BBC Radio 2 in March 2018, replacing Lynn Bowles as the new regular weekday mornings travel news reporter. When Chris Evans left the BBC for Virgin Radio UK in January 2019, Horne went with him, along with Vassos Alexander and a number of other former Radio 2 breakfast show colleagues. Horne has since on occasion returned to presenting the travel news on Radio 2. Horne took on an expanded role on the new Virgin Radio breakfast show including becoming the programme's newsreader. Horne announced she was leaving the show on 28 March 2024.

== Personal life ==
Horne married British comedian Alex Horne on 1 January 2005, whom she met at Sidney Sussex College, Cambridge. The couple have three sons and live in Chesham, Buckinghamshire.

== See also ==
- List of former BBC newsreaders and journalists
