= Lynn Bowles =

British radio presenter

- Born: 1963 (age 62–63); Splott, Cardiff, Wales
- Presenting career
- Stations: BBC Radio 2 (2000–2018); BBC Radio Wales (2012–present)
- Country: United Kingdom

Lynn Bowles (born 1963) is a Welsh broadcaster and a former traffic weekday mornings reporter for BBC Radio 2.

== Early life ==
Bowles was born in Splott, Cardiff, Wales in 1963, and is the youngest of three siblings. Her father, Cliff, was a marine engineer; her mother, Josephine, was born in Monmouth but moved to Rumney in Cardiff.

Bowles attended St Hilda's School, a boarding school in Somerset, before moving to Llanishen High School when the family lived in Rudry. She went on to university in Coventry.

== Broadcasting career ==
After university, Bowles worked in New Orleans for a TV news station. She returned to the UK in the early 1990s but struggled to find work. Eventually she secured a position as a traffic reporter with LBC, on Richard Littlejohn's show. She subsequently joined the Nationwide programme on BBC Radio 5 Live where she remained for eight years before moving to BBC Radio 2 in the year 2000 as the first official traffic news reporter for weekday mornings.

From Saturday 9 June 2012, and for eight consecutive weeks, Bowles presented her own show on BBC Radio Wales, featuring guests such as Ken Bruce with whom she appeared as travel reporter on his show on BBC Radio 2.

Since 2 November 2014, she has presented a weekly Sunday afternoon show on BBC Radio Wales.

On 16 March 2018, during The Chris Evans Breakfast Show and Ken Bruce's mid-morning show, Bowles announced that she would be leaving BBC Radio 2, after 18 years of broadcasting. Her last day was on 29 March 2018. Bowles continues with her BBC Radio Wales show.

On 24 September 2026, it was reported Bowles' weekly Radio Wales show would be axed due to budget cuts at the BBC.

== Personal and charitable activities ==
Bowles learnt to drive in a Land Rover and became a mascot for the marque after competing in the 2004 run of the Macmillan 4x4 UK Challenge and co-presenting the Heritage Motor Centre Land Rover show from 2005 to 2010.

In the August 2013 issue of Land Rover Owner international magazine Bowles was a guest columnist 'for one month only' discussing her childhood experiences in Land Rovers and her time training for the Camel Trophy .

She is an ambassador for Bobath Children's Therapy Centre Wales, a registered charity based in Cardiff that provides specialist Bobath therapy to children from all over Wales who have cerebral palsy. In the November 2007 Children in Need week a "Money can't buy" experience was auctioned which included spending a day with her at Land Rover and other automotive experiences under the banner of 'Petrolheads', and the item raised £22,000 for the charity.

Bowles previously lived in Wimbledon but moved back to Wales permanently in 2018, she regularly travelled back to her family home in the village of Rudry near Caerphilly.

== See also ==
- Sally Boazman
