= Chris Evans Drivetime =

- Other names: The Chris Evans Show
- Genre: Music, Talk
- Running time: 17:00–19:00 (2 hours)
- Country of origin: United Kingdom
- Language: English
- Home station: BBC Radio 2
- Hosted by: Chris Evans
- Starring: Sally Boazman; Rebecca Pike; Jonny Saunders
- Executive producer: Helen Thomas
- Recording studio: Broadcasting House, London
- Original release: 18 April 2006 – 24 December 2009
- Audio format: 88–91 FM, DAB digital radio, television and online
- Website: www.bbc.co.uk/radio2/shows/evans
- Podcast: Chris Evans Drivetime – the Best Bits

Chris Evans Drivetime is the incarnation of the drivetime show on BBC Radio 2 from 18 April 2006 to 24 December 2009, and aired on weekdays between 17:00 and 19:00 in the United Kingdom. It was presented by Chris Evans, who moved to Drivetime from his Saturday afternoon show after Johnnie Walker left the slot after seven years in 2006. On 7 September 2009 the BBC announced that Evans would take over the breakfast show from Sir Terry Wogan, from January 2010, and on 15 September it was confirmed that Simon Mayo would replace Evans on Drivetime. Mayo had been a stand in presenter for Evans on a few occasions.

== The team ==
Evans was joined throughout the programme by three colleagues. Rebecca Pike, née Fox, read the business news. Jonny Saunders read the sports headlines. Sally Boazman presented the travel updates.

=== Rebecca Pike ===
Rebecca Pike, formerly Fox, read the business headlines including the FTSE market data and exchange rates, at 17:20 and 18:20 each day. Listeners also sent in their business-related questions, which Foxy then answered in the second slot. This feature was known as Fox the Fox and was accompanied by Danny Kaye's Outfox the Fox, which acted as the theme tune. Fox the Fox did not appear on Fridays, when the 18:20 round-up was marked with an innovation slot.

=== Jonny Saunders ===
Jonny Saunders rounded up the sports headlines at several points during the show, and spoke to a sports personality every day at 18:50, who was said to be "in the locker". Jonny's Friday slot included a talk about a "mad sport". Jonny also provided the voice for top tenuous, jukebox jury and gobsmackers. See below.

=== Sally Boazman ===
As well as her traffic duties, Boazman was involved with various other aspects of the show's line-up.

== Features, Monday – Thursday ==
As well as business, sport and traffic; the line-up on most weekdays included various features.

=== The Kids ===
Evans spoke to a child each day, who had done something for the first time ever. Their achievements were awarded with a fanfare.

=== Woman's Minute ===
In a gentle parody of BBC Radio 4's Woman's Hour, Chris spoke to four women in quick succession. They were asked who they were, where they were and what they were driving, and for their answer to that week's question.

=== Theme Time Radio Minute ===
A parody of Bob Dylan's Theme Time Radio Hour, Chris played a listener-requested television theme tune.

=== Top Tenuous ===
Jonny Saunders decided the famous person whose listener associations were showcased. This was usually somebody who had been in the news on that day. The aim was for these associations to be as weak as possible, with the top ten most tenuous being the ones selected.

=== Drivetime Jukebox Jury ===
Saunders also presided over the Jukebox Jury. A new track was played, and listeners were invited to text either "hit" or "miss", plus their comments, to the programme. Jonny read The Good, The Bad and The Ugly of these comments (over said theme tune) before Chris Evans announced whether the track was overall a hit or a miss. Tom Jones was present at the judgement of his single "Give a Little Love", but Evans claimed that there were no negative texts received.

=== Gobsmackers ===
Immediately following the Drivetime Jukebox Jury, two connected tracks were played, which were selected by a listener.

=== Monday Mince ===
In 2009, a cheesy song was played after the 18:00 news each Monday, dedicated to burly truckers everywhere.

=== Thirsty Thursday ===
Thursday's programme was known as Thirsty Thursday, and included food with Nigel Barden. The daily clips of how to contact the show were also played simultaneously, as something of a special treat.

== All Request Friday ==
On Fridays, each song was selected by a listener, and all features apart from sport, business and travel were hour-short. The first track was selected on the blog, and thereafter listeners phoned in their requests. All-request Friday was introduced by a rendition of the song "Bring Chris Evans On". When the Friday show was cancelled, such as in Holy Week, Thursday was used as the request day.

== Mascot ==
Also selected annually was the drivetime mascot. The Rex Factor saw listeners' dogs battle it out to become the official mascot. The mascot until the end of the show's run was Biscuit, a bearded collie/terrier X. As of 9 April 2009, Biscuit had 1,619 friends on his facebook page.

== Awards ==
At the 2009 Sony Radio Academy Awards, Chris Evans was awarded Radio Personality of the Year, and Drivetime was awarded the Entertainment Award.

== U2 Concert ==
On 27 February 2009, U2 joined the show and played a 20-minute concert on the roof of Broadcasting House to 5,000 listeners.
