= BBC gender-pay-gap controversy =

The BBC gender pay gap controversy refers to a series of incidents in 2017 and 2018.

== Initial revelations ==
In July 2017, in response to a demand from the UK government as a condition of its new royal charter, the BBC published a list of all employees who earned more than £150,000. (Note: The list included only compensation paid directly from BBC's license fees; payments from BBC Worldwide and payments made through independent production firms were not included.) Of the 96 BBC employees making over this threshold, 62 were men and 34 were women, and of the seven highest earners, all were men. The disclosure prompted criticism of the BBC over the gender pay gap; other critics also criticised a lack of ethnic diversity among the highest-earning BBC personalities. Some commentators, however, argued that the mandatory disclosures were an effort by Theresa May's government to undermine the BBC.

== Carrie Gracie resigns as China editor ==
Early in January 2018, it was announced that Carrie Gracie, the BBC's China editor, had resigned from the role because of the salary gender disparity. A pre-broadcast conversation between Today presenter John Humphrys and Jon Sopel, the BBC's North America editor, was leaked a few days later. Humphrys was recorded joking about the disparity. BBC management itself was said to be "deeply unimpressed" with Humphrys comments. Because of the BBC's impartiality rules, Woman's Hour presenter Jane Garvey, a prominent advocate of equal pay at the BBC, was unable to conduct an interview with Gracie on the programme, while You and Yours presenter Winifred Robinson was briefly taken off-air for tweeting her support for Gracie. More than a fortnight later, it was reported Conservative Culture minister Tracey Crouch, and other female MPs, have refused to be interviewed by Humphrys in response to his comments about Gracie's resignation. Although reported by Anushka Asthana, co-political editor of The Guardian, and other media sources, Crouch has not commented about the issue.

== Male presenters pay cut ==
It became known on 26 January 2018 that some of the BBC's leading male presenters would take a pay cut. According to the BBC's media editor Amol Rajan, Huw Edwards, John Humphrys, Nick Robinson, Jon Sopel and Jeremy Vine, have agreed to a salary reduction. Nicky Campbell, radio 5 live presenter, also told his listeners that he would be taking a pay cut. An independent audit investigating equal pay at the BBC is due shortly.
