= Nick Grimshaw =

English television and radio presenter (born 1984)

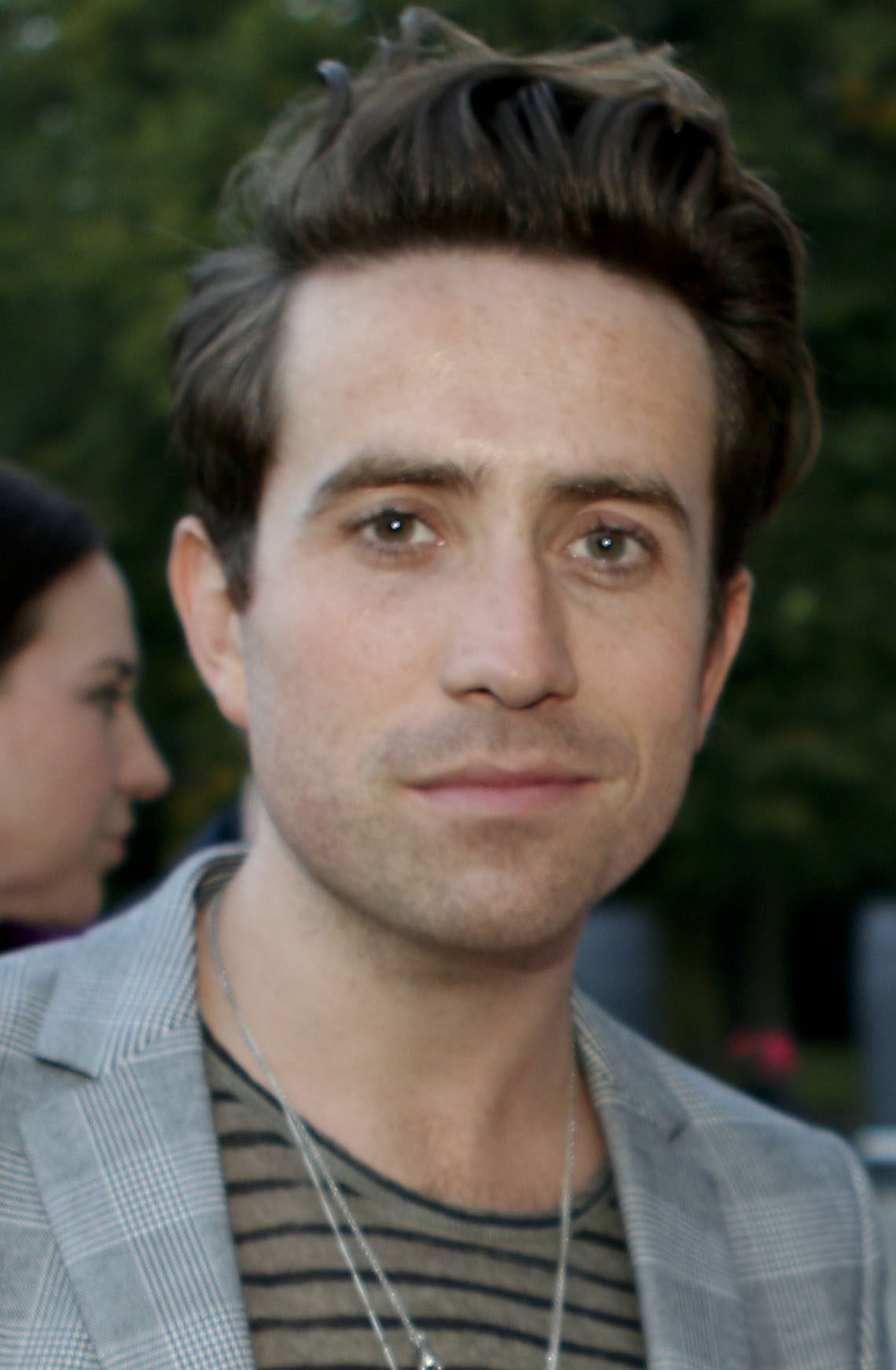
- Grimshaw in 2014
- Born: Nicholas Peter Andrew Grimshaw; 14 August 1984 (age 42); Manchester, England
- Other name: Grimmy
- Education: University of Liverpool
- Occupations: Television presenter; radio presenter; disc jockey; author
- Years active: 2006–present
- Employer(s): BBC; Channel 4
- Partner(s): Mesh Henry (2018-present; engaged)

Nicholas Peter Andrew Grimshaw (born 14 August 1984), nicknamed Grimmy, is an English radio DJ, television presenter and writer. He hosted a variety of shows on BBC Radio 1 from 2007 to 2021, including BBC Switch and the breakfast show. Since 2024, he has presented BBC Radio 6 Music's flagship breakfast show.

On television, Grimshaw was a presenter on Channel 4's teenage block T4 and The Album Chart Show. In 2015, he was a judge on the 12th series of The X Factor. As a podcaster, Grimshaw co-hosts Dish with Angela Hartnett and Sidetracked with Annie Mac.

== Early life and education ==
Grimshaw was born at St Mary's Hospital in Manchester and grew up in Royton. His father Peter was born in 1941 (d.2016) and worked in Sales & Marketing, his mother is Eileen and often accompanies Nick to Celebrity parties. He has an older brother and sister. He was educated at Our Lady's Roman Catholic High School, failing and having to resit his Maths GCSE exam, followed by the University of Liverpool between 2002 and 2005, studying Communication and Media Studies. He failed his final year, graduating with a DipHE rather than a bachelor's degree. During his studies at the University of Liverpool, Grimshaw was also a member of the University's student radio station, ICON Radio (now Liverpool Guild Student Media). Following University, he moved to Camden, London, where he handed out advertising fliers and was an early friend of Amy Winehouse.

== Career ==
=== Radio ===
Grimshaw joined BBC Radio 1 in September 2007, presenting the BBC's youth strand Switch with close friend and fellow DJ Annie Mac. He hosted the show for 9 months solo while Mac hosted a weekend lunchtime slot.

From October 2008 to May 2009, Grimshaw hosted Radio 1's Weekend Breakfast Show. Grimshaw then went on to present the 10 pm – midnight slot on BBC Radio 1 on 1 June 2009, following the departure of Colin Murray. He regularly joked about how long his position at BBC Radio 1 would last and whether he would actually be able to complete his long list of "1000 Albums Everyone Says You Should Listen To But We Only Have Time To Play One Track So Here It Is" which was a nightly feature on his show. He managed to reach number 369, before he left for the breakfast show.

On 11 July 2012, it was announced that Grimshaw would replace the long-standing Chris Moyles as host of Radio 1 Breakfast. The last live show was broadcast on 12 September 2012, although the last show broadcast under the show's name was a pre-recorded episode entitled "The 1000 Albums Show". His first breakfast show programme was on 24 September 2012.

In November 2012, Grimshaw attracted criticism from Magic Radio breakfast presenter Neil Fox for comments he made about Radio 1's decision to omit Robbie Williams's "Candy" from its A-List playlist – reportedly due to being "too old" for the station's target demographic. Some days later, Grimshaw was in tabloid headlines when the papers in question claimed he refused to promote Rihanna's latest album because she cancelled an interview with him – a claim which Grimshaw denied, noting that his snub was intended to be "tongue in cheek".

On 24 October 2013, it was reported that Grimshaw's Breakfast Show had one million fewer listeners than Moyles' and that its audience figures were the worst for the station in over a decade, with BBC Radio 2, BBC Radio 3 and BBC Radio 4 all beating it in the ratings. At the time, Grimshaw's show was close to the record low of 5.5 million listeners, set by Sara Cox in 2003, toward the end of her three-year tenure hosting the show. In February 2014, the Breakfast Show recorded an enhancement of more than 700,000 listeners, which set the average number of listeners per week to 6.3 million. However, on 15 March 2014, it was reported that Grimshaw had lost another 510,000 listeners, for a weekly total of 5.78 million. The BBC claimed that this was part of the goal to attract younger listeners, while shedding the over-25s.

In March 2014, he completed a twelve-hour bicycle ride for Sport Relief. The event raised more than £115,000. Later that year, he also took part in the Clash of the Titans event as part of John Bishop's team Team Bishop.

In May 2015, Grimshaw's Breakfast Show fell to 5.5 million listeners a week, becoming tied with Sara Cox's show for the lowest number of listeners in Radio 1's history. The station controller Ben Cooper congratulated Grimshaw saying, "I'm pleased that Grimmy is doing what I've asked of him by keeping his young audience happy and scaring off the over-30s.". In August 2016, listener figures were reported to have dropped to 5.4 million, down 400,000-year-on-year, and making it the lowest listened to breakfast show in the station's history.

In July 2017, the BBC confirmed that Grimshaw's salary was in the £350,000 – £399,999 bracket. In October 2017, his Breakfast Show fell to 4.93 million listeners a week, the lowest listening figures for BBC Radio 1's breakfast show since records began. Controller Ben Cooper defended the stats and said it was still "the most relevant youth brand in the UK today".

On 31 May 2018, it was announced that Grimshaw would be leaving the breakfast show and effectively swapping shows with Greg James. The move meant Grimshaw took over the 4-7pm drivetime slot. On 30 June 2021, Grimshaw announced he would be leaving Radio 1 after 14 years on air. His final show on the station was on 12 August 2021.

On 9 January 2025, it was announced by the BBC that Grimshaw would take over from Lauren Laverne as the new presenter of BBC Radio 6 Music's breakfast show, which he has covered for since August 2024. It also marks Laverne's move to the mid-morning slot as she returned to the station for the first time since she was diagnosed with cancer and subsequently given the all-clear.

=== Television ===
Grimshaw's career started on UK entertainment channel E4, hosting daily shows. In September 2007, he crossed over to Channel 4, hosting the daily breakfast show Freshly Squeezed with Alexa Chung and more recently Jameela Jamil, airing 7 am on weekdays. The pair went on to host various award shows for TV and coverage from music events and festivals for Channel 4. As well as hosting the radio show BBC Switch for BBC Radio 1, Grimshaw and Annie Mac teamed up to host music show Sound for BBC Two. He presented the first ever BBC Switch Awards show with Kimberley Walsh of Girls Aloud on BBC One.

In summer 2011, Grimshaw hosted a live 6-part series for Channel 4 on Saturdays entitled New Look Style the Nation, in which hopeful fashion designers competed for a job at New Look. In 2012, he co-presented the iTunes Festival with Annie Mac throughout September for Channel 4.

On 30 April 2013, he began presenting BBC Three panel show, Sweat the Small Stuff. On 2 August 2013, Grimshaw hosted a one-off panel show on Channel 4 called That Music Show. In late 2013, Grimshaw appeared in as many soap operas he could, filming cameo roles in EastEnders, Coronation Street, Emmerdale, Hollyoaks and Home and Away. In 2013, he narrated Hotel of Mum and Dad for BBC Three.

In 2014, Grimshaw presented The Brits Are Coming, the show that revealed some of the nominees at the 2014 Brit Awards. Since 2014 he has been a regular guest co–presenter on The One Show.

On 16 June 2015, it was revealed that Grimshaw would join the twelfth series of The X Factor as a judge to replace Louis Walsh. He was selected to mentor the "Boys" category and chose Mason Noise, Ché Chesterman and Seann Miley Moore for the live shows. Following the eliminations of Moore in week 2 and Noise in week 4, he guided Chesterman through to the final, where he finished in third place. On 19 February 2016, Grimshaw announced he would not be returning to the show for its thirteenth series and was replaced by Walsh.

Since June 2019, he has appeared on Celebrity Gogglebox alongside his niece Liv, as well as the Stand Up to Cancer specials.

In spring 2021, Grimshaw appeared as a contestant on The Great British Bake Off For Stand Up To Cancer.

=== Art ===
Grimshaw has expressed his interest in contemporary art and set design. In 2016, he sold one of his paintings as part of a secret charity auction during Frieze Art Fair.

He is an ambassador for the Royal Academy of Arts. In 2017, he was commissioned to design a Christmas tree in celebration of the Academy's 250th anniversary.

Interested in live music production, Grimshaw interned with the stage designer Es Devlin in 2017.

=== Other work ===
Grimshaw launched and judged Column Idol 2014, an annual competition set up by charity Media Trust with The Sun newspaper to find new writing talent.

He makes a cameo appearance as himself in Absolutely Fabulous: The Movie (2016).

Grimshaw's debut autobiography, Soft Lad, was published by Hodder & Stoughton on 27 October 2022.

In October 2021, he was featured in the BBC series Walking With..., walking in Northumberland from Warkworth to Amble.

Since June 2022, Grimshaw embarked on a weekly podcast "Dish" with Waitrose alongside Michelin-star chef Angela Hartnett.

Since September 2023, Grimshaw and lifelong friend Annie Mac have co-hosted the BBC Sounds podcast Sidetracked with Annie and Nick, in which the pair discuss the week in music and culture.

== Personal life ==
On 17 August 2012, Grimshaw spoke about being a gay man. He appeared at number 8 on The Independent on Sunday's list of the 101 most influential LGBTQ people in Britain 2012. Nick Grimshaw was awarded the title of GQ Best-Dressed Man of the Year in 2014 by the British edition of the magazine. Since 2018, Grimshaw has been an ambassador for The Albert Kennedy Trust, also known as Akt, a charity helping homeless LGBTQ youth.

In October 2018, Grimshaw announced that he was dating Meshach 'Mesh' Henry, a dancer 12 years his junior. On 31 March 2022, he announced via Instagram that they were engaged. They live in the London Borough of Hackney and have two dogs.

In August 2024, Grimshaw and members of his family were targeted by burglars while staying in a rented villa in Ibiza.

== Filmography ==
Television

Year	Title	Channel	Role	Notes
2007	Freshly Squeezed	Channel 4	Co-presenter	
2007–2009	Sound	BBC Two	Co–presenter	3 series
2008	Big Brother's Big Mouth	Channel 4	Week 4 presenter	5 episodes
2008–2012	The Album Chart Show	Channel 4	Presenter	
2010–2012	T4	Channel 4	Co–presenter	
2012	iTunes Festival	Channel 4	Co–presenter	
2012–2015	Children in Need	BBC One/BBC Two	Co–presenter	
2013–2014	Sweat the Small Stuff	BBC Three	Presenter	4 series
2014	The BRITs Are Coming	ITV	Presenter	
2014–	The One Show	BBC One	Guest co–presenter	3 episodes
2015	Soundchain	MTV	Presenter	1 series
2015	The X Factor	ITV	Judge	Series 12
2017	One Love Manchester	BBC One	Co-presenter	Television special
2017	Harry Styles at the BBC	BBC One	Presenter	Television special
2019–	Celebrity Gogglebox	Channel 4	Himself	6 series, 1 special
2022–	The Great Home Transformation	Channel 4	Co-presenter	An IKEA production
2023	Project Home	Channel 4	Presenter	
2024	The Underdog: Josh Must Win	Channel 4	Host	

Guest appearances

- Never Mind the Buzzcocks
- 8 Out of 10 Cats
- Celebrity Juice
- Sunday Brunch
- Alan Carr: Chatty Man
- Hollyoaks
- Shopping with Keith Lemon
- The Great British Bake Off For Stand Up To Cancer
- Ricky Wilson's Art Jam

Radio

Year	Station	Show
2007–2012	BBC Radio 1	Nick Grimshaw and Annie Mac
2008–2009	BBC Radio 1	Weekend Breakfast
2009–2012	BBC Radio 1	Late Night
2012–2018	BBC Radio 1	Radio 1 Breakfast
2018–2021	BBC Radio 1	Drivetime
2023-2024	Virgin Radio UK	Relief presenter
2024-	BBC Radio 6 Music	Breakfast

Films

Year	Title	Role
2012	Wreck-It Ralph	Dr. Brad Scott (UK film version)
2016	Absolutely Fabulous: The Movie	Himself (Cameo appearance)

Media offices
Preceded by Chris Moyles	BBC Radio 1 Breakfast Show Presenter; 2012–2018	Succeeded by Greg James
