= Vassos Alexander =

English sports reporter, presenter, author, and endurance runner

- Born: London, UK
- Occupations: Sports reporter, radio presenter and writer
- Years active: 2004-present
- Known for: The Chris Evans Breakfast Show
- Notable work: Don't Stop Me Now: 26.2 Tales of a Runner's Obsession; Running up that Hill; How to Run a Marathon: The Go-to Guide for Anyone and Everyone

Vassos Alexander Georgiadis is a British sports reporter, presenter, author and endurance runner. He was the sports presenter of The Chris Evans Breakfast Show on Virgin Radio. Alexander hosted the parkrun podcast, he is a motivational speaker and serves as an ambassador for the young person's charity SkillForce.

== Broadcasting career ==
From 2011, Alexander was the sports presenter on The Chris Evans Breakfast Show on BBC Radio 2. In January 2019, Alexander along with Chris Evans, and several members of the BBC Radio 2 team moved to the Breakfast Show on Virgin Radio, Alexander left the show in July 2025.

He has also worked on Radio 5 Live as a presenter, reported and commentated on BBC Television, Channel 4, BT Sport and Eurosport. He has reported on six Olympic Games for BBC Sport and has commentated on tennis, golf, diving and darts.

== Podcasts ==
From April 2018 until it ceased in May 2022 Alexander was the co-host of 'free weekly timed', a podcast about parkrunning. Alexander is a parkrunner and co-hosted the podcast with Helen Williams.

== Running ==
Alexander has competed in ultra-marathons, including the 153-mile Spartathalon and ironman triathlons. He has run over 50 road marathons and has a sub-3-hour personal best.

== Author ==
Alexander has written three books on running.

- Alexander, Vassos (2016). Don't Stop Me Now: 26.2 Tales of a Runner's Obsession. Bloomsbury Sport. ISBN 9781472921536. - a celebration of running in 26.2 chapters
- Alexander, Vassos (8 May 2018). Running Up That Hill, the highs and lows of going that bit further. Bloomsbury Publishing. ISBN 978-1-4729-4796-3. - explores what lies beyond the marathon finish line
- Alexander, Vassos (2021). How to Run a Marathon: The Go-to Guide for Anyone and Everyone. HarperCollins. ISBN 9780008377229.
