= Liz Kershaw =

English radio broadcaster and journalist

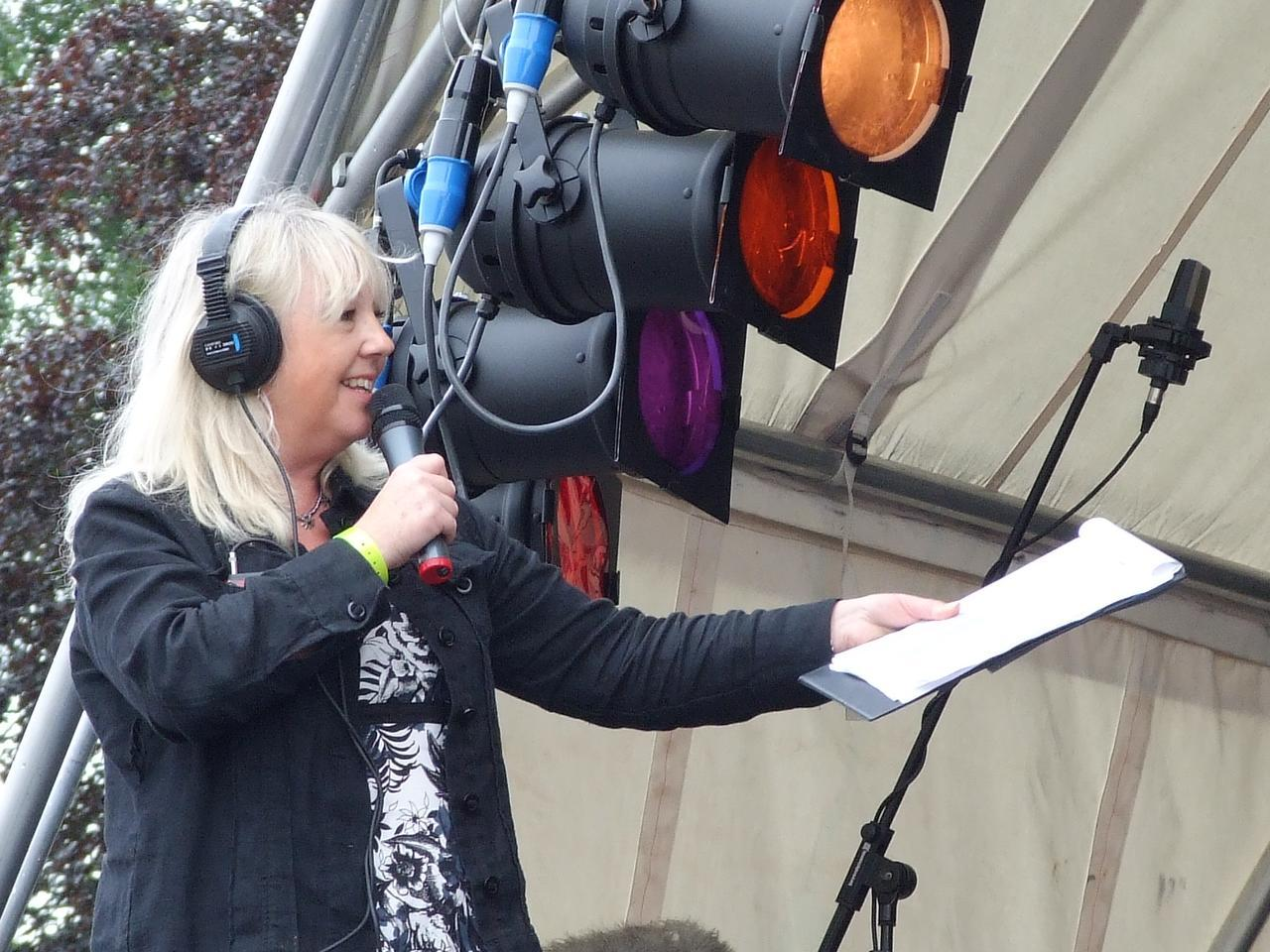
- Godiva Festival 2007, Coventry
- Born: Elizabeth Marguerita Mary Kershaw; 30 July 1958 (age 68); Littleborough, Lancashire, England
- Occupations: Broadcaster; journalist
- Years active: 1980–present
- Relatives: Andy Kershaw (brother)

Elizabeth Marguerita Mary Kershaw (born 30 July 1958) is an English radio broadcaster. She is one of the longest serving female national radio DJs in the UK, celebrating 30 years on national BBC Radio in 2017.

== Career ==
After graduating from the University of Leeds, Liz Kershaw began her media career in Leeds with a music column in the Yorkshire Post. Her brother was fellow broadcaster Andy Kershaw. Her first radio show was in 1981 on Radio Aire where her brother worked for a time. In 1985, she moved to BBC Radio Leeds to present a weekly rock show showcasing local bands.

In 1986, Kershaw's day job with British Telecom saw her move to London to help set up "Livewire" (managing editor of Livewire was Chartcall system manager, formerly Virgin Records press officer, Gerald O'Connell), a dial-in pop service which superseded Dial-a-Disc. In running this she produced Radio 1 DJs Mike Smith, Janice Long and Dave Pearce before devising her own show for Radio 1 in 1987, Backchat, which won several awards.

This was followed by Kershaw presenting the Radio 1 Evening Show and then, with Bruno Brookes, Radio 1's Weekend Breakfast Show and the Radio 1 Roadshow from 1989 to 1992. During this period they also made three charity records for the BBC's Children in Need campaign.

Kershaw left Radio 1 in 1992 to present The Crunch, the UK's first national daily phone-in on BBC Radio 5 but continued to host occasional shows on the station.

In 1994, Kershaw was part of the team which relaunched the station as BBC Radio 5 Live. In 2000, she went back to BBC Local Radio as the first and only woman in the country to present a solo radio breakfast show. This was BBC Radio Northampton's breakfast programme, which was nominated for the Best Breakfast Show Award at the Sony Radio Awards in 2002 along with Radio 4's Today Programme and the 5 Live Breakfast Show.

=== Dawn Chorus and the Blue Tits ===
In 1984, Kershaw formed a band called Dawn Chorus and the Blue Tits with her friend and neighbour Countdown presenter Carol Vorderman. Their recordings included a version of "Teenage Kicks" with the Undertones' O'Neill brothers (John and Damian), which was released on Stiff Records' DAWN 1. and a Peel Session which was broadcast on Radio 1 in 1985.

== Recent career ==
In 2002, Kershaw was one of the original presenters on the digital station BBC Radio 6 Music where she presented the weekday afternoon show from 1.00pm-4.00pm, before moving to the weekend mid-morning slots in April 2004, from 10.00am-1.00pm.

In September 2005, Kershaw became a weekday presenter on the BBC CWR radio station, where she took over the Drivetime show. She later presented the weekday Breakfast Show for the station and continued to present a show on BBC Radio 6 Music, but on Saturdays only.

In July 2007, following a complaint from Buckingham Palace about the misrepresentation of the Queen in a BBC documentary, Mark Thompson, then-Director-General of the BBC, in a public purging exercise, singled out Kershaw's show in what became an infamous BBC scandal, announcing that some of the DJ's shows that were aired as live were in fact pre-recorded and that members of the production team had passed themselves off as listeners texting and emailing into competitions.

It was subsequently revealed by journalists and listeners that other shows presented by Russell Brand, Jo Whiley, Tony Blackburn and Dermot O'Leary were also involved in the same endemic production practices.

On 30 July 2008, the BBC was accused by media watchdog Ofcom of 'misleading its audiences' by 'faking' audience interaction. Ofcom stated that the BBC 'deceived its audience by faking winners of competitions and deliberately conducting competitions unfairly and fined the corporation a record £400,000 of which Kershaw's BBC Radio 6 Music show was fined £115,000 for seventeen shows in 2005 and 2006.

Until June 2022, she could be heard on BBC Radio 6 Music Sunday lunchtimes 1.00pm-2.00pm. She left the breakfast show at BBC CWR on Friday 17 July 2009 when the management decided to change the hosts.

In October 2012, Kershaw told the BBC Radio 4 Today programme that she had been routinely groped while working as a Radio1 DJ in the 1980s. She said the station had a culture that was very intimidating for a young woman.

In November 2012, Kershaw was named in a case involving the suicide of BBC journalist Russell Joslin, who had alleged that Kershaw had sexually harassed him.

In 2014, she released her autobiography, The Bird and the Beeb.

== Political views ==
Kershaw voted for Brexit and was described by The Daily Telegraph as "an unabashed cheerleader" for Boris Johnson, who she called "fiercely intelligent" and "the best kind of Tory - a philanthropic Conservative".

In 2020, Kershaw criticised UK government period poverty measures and expressed support for the use of "old rags" as sanitary products.

On 31 March 2025, Kershaw gave a speech in support of Reform UK for the elections in Kent that year.

On 21 July 2026, she received criticism from several people including Richard Bacon for criticising the appearance of Marie France van-Heel, the wife of Prime Minister Andy Burnham. Others who criticised her noted van-Heel had previously had a double mastectomy after learning she possessed cancer gene BRCA1 and criticised the comments as contributing to body shaming. Kershaw had stated on X (formerly Twitter): "Apparently this dress is by Victoria Beckham. Bit nasty of her to let Mrs Burnham pay 900 quid for something in Crimplene that doesn’t fit her. Sisterhood eh?"
