= Sara Cox =

English broadcaster (born 1974)

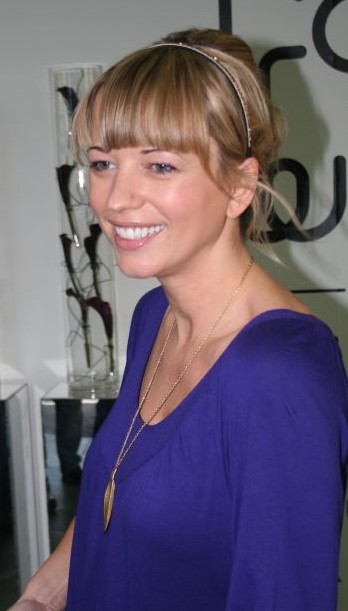
- Cox at Manchester Fashion Week, October 2007
- Born: Sarah Joanne Cox; 13 December 1974 (age 51); Bolton, Lancashire, England
- Occupations: Television presenter, radio presenter, author
- Years active: 1996–present
- Spouses: Jon Carter (m. 2001; div. 2005) Ben Cyzer (m. 2013)
- Children: 3
- Website: www.bbc.co.uk/programmes/b0b25n9h

Sara Joanne Cyzer (née Cox, born 13 December 1974), better known by her maiden name Sara Cox, is an English radio DJ, television presenter and author. She hosted a range of BBC Radio 1 shows from 1999 to 2014, including the breakfast show from 2000 to 2003. She later joined Radio 2 and has hosted its breakfast show since July 2026.

Cox has also presented a number of television shows for the BBC including The Great Pottery Throw Down (2015–2017), Too Much TV (2016) and Back in Time for... (2018–2020).

== Early life and career ==
Cox was born Sarah Joanne Cox on 13 December 1974, but later dropped the use of the letter 'h' from her first name. Her parents lived in the village of Little Lever near Bolton, Greater Manchester, where she grew up on her father's farm. Interviewed in 2024 she said "I'm very much my father's daughter." She was the youngest of five children. Her parents separated when she was six or seven, after which she moved with her mother and a sister to another house in the same village. Cox attended Smithills High School until the age of 16, and left Canon Slade School after her four A-levels to pursue a career in modelling.

She appeared in the music video for Orchestral Manoeuvres in the Dark's 1993 single "Everyday", and on a controversial promotional poster for the 1995 video game Wipeout.

Cox won her first television show role in 1996, presenting The Girlie Show on Channel 4. She later had stints on Channel 5 entertainment show Exclusive and Channel 4 music programme Born Sloppy. In 1997, Cox presented on the UK feed of MTV, hosting MTV Hot, a late-night music show. In 1998, Cox won her first film role in The Bitterest Pill.

In September 1998, Cox became a presenter of The Big Breakfast. During her time on the programme, she interviewed stars including Robbie Williams, Sting and Leonardo DiCaprio. Cox preferred to do interviews in her father's caravan, situated in The Big Breakfast garden.

== BBC Radio 1 ==
=== 1999–2002 ===
A transfer to radio came on 19 September 1999 when she joined BBC Radio 1. She launched The Surgery with Mark Hamilton, where Cox acted as "Nurse Coxy". She also co-hosted the Saturday lunchtime show with Emma B from 13:00 – 15:00 after been interviewed by Simon Mayo on his mid-morning show as a guest.

In December 1999, it was announced that Cox would replace Zoe Ball as presenter of Radio 1 Breakfast. Cox's breakfast show stint began on 3 April 2000. Initially, her listening figures grew from 6.9 million to 7.8 million listeners during her first fifteen months in the job — earning Radio 1 its largest breakfast audience ever — higher than that of her predecessor and ex-BBC Radio 1 DJ Chris Evans. By August 2002, however, numbers had dipped back under 7 million.

=== 2003–2008 ===
In January 2003, Cox denied rumours that she was preparing to leave the BBC for a rival show and signed a three-year contract with the public service broadcaster. In August 2003, the BBC again denied rumours, reported in the Daily Mail, that she had been given ten weeks to increase ratings, or to face replacement. However, two months later, the BBC announced that Cox, whose listening figures had slipped to 6.6 million, would be replaced by Chris Moyles in January 2004. Cox hosted her final breakfast show on 19 December 2003.

Cox then presented the afternoon "drivetime" slot, effectively swapping shows with Moyles. She hosted the Drivetime show for six months with features such as "For Your Ears Only", "Me, Myself and I", and "Chap's Eye Pub Quiz" (referring to her former sidekick Mark Chapman). At the end of May 2004, Cox began her maternity leave to give birth. Before she returned to Radio 1 in early 2005, Scott Mills, the presenter who took over her slot during her maternity leave, was given the drivetime slot permanently.

From February 2005, Cox took over the afternoon show (13:00 – 16:00) on Saturdays and Sundays.

=== 2008–2014 ===
On 17 February 2008, Cox presented her last show for six months before leaving for maternity leave to have her second child. Annie Mac presented the show during her absence until Cox's return in September 2008. Cox and Annie Mac both later covered for Jo Whiley who was on maternity leave between 29 September 2008 to 20 February 2009. Following Whiley's return, Cox returned to weekends to present a Sunday mid-morning show, broadcasting between 10:00 and 13:00.

In March 2010, Cox went on maternity leave for the third time, with new presenter Matt Edmondson providing cover. She returned to the station on 9 August 2010 to cover for Fearne Cotton for three weeks. Cox made a self-confessed "unexpected" return to the breakfast show on 2 and 3 September 2010, as she sat in for the ill Chris Moyles.

In August 2012, it was announced that Cox, Gemma Cairney, Huw Stephens, Jameela Jamil, Alice Levine, and Annie Mac would cover Fearne Cotton's show on BBC Radio 1 weekdays from 10:00 to 12:45, whilst Cotton was on maternity leave, until Cotton's return in September 2013. After Cotton's return, Cox presented various cover shows; her final show for Radio 1 was on 17 February 2014.

== BBC Radio 2 ==
In June 2011, Cox began hosting the fourth series of the comedy programme Hot Gossip on BBC Radio 2, covering for Claudia Winkleman, who chose not to present the series as she was pregnant at the time. In 2012, Cox covered for Alex Lester, Janice Long, Ken Bruce, and Vanessa Feltz, as well as providing cover for Simon Mayo Drivetime and Steve Wright in the Afternoon.

Between 2012 and 2018, and from 2025 she was the stand-in presenter for The Radio 2 Breakfast Show.

Cox joined Radio 2 for her first regular show each Saturday night from 22:00 to midnight, presenting Sounds of the 80s to complement the already existing Sounds of the 60s and Sounds of the 70s. The show began on Saturday 5 October 2013. The show moved to Friday nights from April 2016. She was replaced as host of Sounds of the 80s by Gary Davies; Cox presented her final edition of the show on 11 May 2018.

Between 14 May 2018 and 13 December 2018, Cox began a new late-night show on Radio 2; the show ran from Monday to Thursday between 22:00 to midnight.

On 29 October 2018, it was announced that Cox would succeed Simon Mayo as drivetime presenter on 14 January 2019.

On 1 July 2022, it was announced that, from September, Cox would extend her drivetime show by an hour to run from 16:00–19:00 to coincide with Scott Mills joining the station on a permanent basis to present from 14:00–16:00.

On 23 April 2026, it was announced that Cox would take over The Radio 2 Breakfast Show, following the sacking of Scott Mills from the station in March of that year. It launched on 6 July 2026.

== Television ==
In July 2007, Cox presented London Live on Channel 4, and appeared as a guest star on the Sky1 show Angela and Friends in November 2009 and as guest presenter in January 2010. Also in 2010, she appeared as a team captain on What Do Kids Know? along with Rufus Hound and Joe Swash on the Watch channel.

Cox commentated for the semi-finals of the Eurovision Song Contest on BBC Three with fellow Radio 1 DJ Scott Mills at the 2011 Contest and 2012 Contest, and again in 2021 as a late stand-in for Rylan Clark. Cox was replaced by Ana Matronic starting from the 2013 Contest.

On 21 October 2014, Cox guest presented a Children in Need episode of The Great British Sewing Bee.

In April 2015, it was announced that Cox would present The Great Pottery Throw Down for BBC Two. The first series began in November 2015 and the second in February 2017.

In 2016, Cox co-presenting Too Much TV, a daily magazine show on BBC Two.

In 2017, Cox appeared on Dara O Briain's Go 8 Bit and was on Steve's team in the show. She lost the episode in terms of points. On 4 June 2017, Cox co-presented the One Love Manchester benefit concert special and British television special with Ore Oduba.

Since 2018, Cox has co-presented Back in Time for..., where a modern-day family enjoy meals that were eaten by families of years gone by. She replaced Giles Coren. From May 2018, Cox presents Love in the Countryside for BBC Two.

On 5 March 2019, it was announced that Cox would host a new ITV show, entitled The Sara Cox Show, which would feature entertainment, live music and celebrity guests and which would air on Saturday and Sunday mornings.

In October 2020, Cox launched and presented Between the Covers on BBC Two, a seven-episode book programme, which was renewed and ran for a total of eight series, ending in December 2024.

On 15 November 2025 Cox confirmed that she was to be the presenter of The Marvellous Miniatures Workshop for BBC One. In each of the eight episodes, professional model makers will bring places, people and iconic moments in time back to life via miniature models.

== Books ==
In March 2019, her book Till the Cows Come Home: A Lancashire Childhood, a memoir of growing up in 1980s Lancashire, was published by Coronet Books.

Her debut novel Thrown was published in May 2022. Her second novel Way Back was published in March 2024.

== Personal life ==
=== Family ===
Cox married the DJ Jon Carter in October 2001. Their daughter was born on 13 June 2004. In December 2005, it was announced the couple had separated and that Cox was dating marketing executive Ben Cyzer. On 16 September 2007, Cox announced, on her BBC Radio 1 weekend show, that she was expecting her second child, and her first with Cyzer. Cox's last weekend show was on Sunday 17 February 2008 before she left for six months' maternity leave. Her second child, a boy, was born on 10 March 2008. She returned to Radio 1 in September 2008. Cox went on maternity leave for the third time, after her show on 7 March 2010. Less than a week later, on 12 March, she gave birth to a girl. On 23 June 2013, Cox tweeted a picture to announce she and Cyzer had got married. They live in Willesden, north London.

=== Advocacy ===
Cox says that she is committed to protecting the environment. In 2009 she joined the 10:10 project in a bid to help her reduce her carbon footprint. She explained that, as she was brought up on a farm, she has no problem wearing extra layers instead of turning up the thermostat. Giving up meat was for her a different story, however, saying: "My dad is a beef farmer so he wouldn't be best pleased. I tried going veggie once, but it lasted about four hours."

In August 2014 Cox was one of 200 public figures who were signatories to a letter to The Guardian opposing Scottish independence in the run-up to September's referendum on that issue. She revealed, when taking part in a one-off celebrity special of The Crystal Maze, that she had voted against Brexit in 2016.

=== Privacy ===
In June 2003, Cox and her ex-husband Jon received £50,000 in an out-of-court settlement from the British newspaper The People after it printed photographs of her sunbathing naked on her honeymoon in 2001. Cox, who was photographed with a telephoto lens while on a private island, initially complained to the Press Complaints Commission, who found in her favour. The People printed an apology. Cox was unsatisfied, and sued the newspaper in the High Court for a breach of her right to privacy under the Human Rights Act.

The People agreed to an out of court settlement with Cox and her ex-husband before any judgement was made. Cox received £30,000 and he £20,000, The People also agreed to pay the couple's legal costs, reported to be in excess of £100,000.

=== Stalking incident ===
In July 2017, a convicted child sex offender named Anthony Collins was convicted of stalking Cox, after sending her and her husband Ben a series of letters. He had sent the letters to her home address, which he reportedly obtained after purchasing details about the address for £17. He subsequently pleaded guilty to harassment and was sentenced to 16 months in prison.

== Charitable activity ==
Cox was one of 52 celebrities contributing to a children's story entitled Once Upon a Time to promote a new charity directory inquiries number 118 520. The book was auctioned with the profits going to the NSPCC. Cox is also a supporter of the animal charity PDSA, and has promoted the charity by being photographed with her pet dog, Snoop, by the late Lord Lichfield.

Cox has also been an ambassador for Centrepoint—the UK's charity for homeless young people—since 2000, making her its longest serving celebrity supporter.

In 2006, Cox participated as a celebrity showjumper in the BBC's Sport Relief event Only Fools on Horses.

From 09:30 on 20 March 2017 to 09:30 on 21 March 2017, Cox performed a solo 24-hour danceathon on Radio 2, raising money for Comic Relief, Red Nose Day. She raised over £800,000 for Red Nose Day according to the commentary on television and the newspaper Manchester Evening News.

In November 2025, Cox undertook the Great Northern Marathon Challenge to raise money for BBC Children in Need. She covered the 135 miles from Kielder Forest to Calverley in Leeds on foot over a period of 5 days. During the live broadcast of Children in Need on Friday 14 November 2025,it was announced that the total raised by Cox was £9,523,028. After further donations, the final figure raised was over £11 million.

== Awards and honours ==
In November 2006, Cox was awarded an honorary doctorate by the University of Bolton for contributions to broadcasting.

== Filmography ==
Year	Title	Role	Notes
1996–1997	The Girlie Show	Co-presenter	
2000	Top of the Pops	Presenter	
2006	Hustle	Herself	Cameo role
2007	The Album Chart Show	Presenter	
2009, 2010	Angela and Friends	Guest appearance/guest presenter	Cameo role
2009	The BRIT Awards: Red Carpet	Co-presenter	
2010	What Do Kids Know?	Team captain	
2011	Eurovision Song Contest 2011	UK Commentator	Semi Finals
2012	Eurovision Song Contest 2012	UK Commentator	Semi Finals
2013	Never Mind the Buzzcocks	Guest presenter	1 episode
2014	The Great Children in Need Sewing Bee	Presenter	
2015–2017	The Great Pottery Throw Down	Presenter	2 series
2016	Too Much TV	Co-presenter	1 series
2016	Britain's Most Spectacular Backyard Builds	Co-presenter	1 series
2017	One Love Manchester	Co-presenter	Television coverage
2017	Children in Need Rocks the 80s	Co-presenter	
2017	Tipping Point : Lucky Stars	Contestant	1 episode (Season 4, Episode 2)
2018	Britain's Favourite Dogs: Top 100	Co-presenter	One-off special
2018–2020	Back in Time for...	Presenter	2 series
2018–2020	Love in the Countryside	Presenter	1 series; 1 upcoming
2018	The Big NHS Singalong	Co-presenter	One-off special
2018	This Morning	Guest presenter	
2019	The Sara Cox Show	Presenter	
2020–2024	Between the Covers	Presenter	8 series
2021	Eurovision Song Contest 2021	UK Commentator (stand in)	Semi Finals
2021–2025	Morning Live	Presenter	
2022	Britain's Top Takeaways	Co-presenter	With Darren Harriott
2023	Ant & Dec's Saturday Night Takeaway: Behind Doors	Narrator	
2024	The Great Celebrity Bake Off for Stand Up To Cancer	Herself / contestant	One Episode
2025	Sara Cox: Every Step of the Way for Children in Need	Presenter	
2025	The Marvellous Miniatures Workshop	Host	

Media offices
Preceded by Zoe Ball	BBC Radio 1 Breakfast Show Presenter; 2000–2003	Succeeded by Chris Moyles
Preceded by Simon Mayo	BBC Radio 2 Drivetime Show Presenter; 2019–2026	Succeeded by Angela Scanlon
Preceded by Scott Mills	BBC Radio 2 Breakfast Show Presenter; 2026–present	Succeeded by Incumbent
