= Simon Mayo Breakfast Show =

Breakfast show on BBC Radio 1

Simon Mayo
- Genre: Music, Talk
- Running time: 3 hours
- Country of origin: United Kingdom
- Language: English
- Home station: BBC Radio 1
- Hosted by: Simon Mayo
- Produced by: Ric Blaxill
- Original release: 23 May 1988 – 3 September 1993
- Audio format: 97-99 FM, 1053, 1089 MW

The Simon Mayo Breakfast Show is the weekday breakfast show on BBC Radio 1 between 23 May 1988 and 3 September 1993. The programme was broadcast on weekdays, apart from on bank holidays and between Christmas and new year, and had three broadcast slots. Originally on air between 7 am and 9.30 am, it gained an extra 30 minutes on 3 April 1989 to coincide with an earlier start to Radio 1’s day. Finally, when Radio 1 began 24-hour transmissions on 1 May 1991, the programme was broadcast between 6 am and 9 am. The programme ended as part of the major shake-up of the BBC Radio 1 schedule by Matthew Bannister, which saw Mayo move to the station’s mid-morning slot.

== Format ==
The programme, which was based on a "zoo" format, saw Mayo being joined by The Breakfast Crew consisting of news anchor Rod McKenzie and a weather/travel presenter, of which there were four regular presenters throughout the show's run - Carol Dooley (1988), Sybil Ruscoe (1988–89), Jackie Brambles (8 Jan - 14 Sep 1990) and Dianne Oxberry (October 1990 until the programme ended three years later). Weather and travel presenter stand-ins included Lynn Parsons, Caron Keating and Philippa Forrester.

News headlines were broadcast every 20 minutes. 30-second headline bulletins aired at 10 to and 10 past, alongside the full bulletin at half past the hour. The weather forecast was broadcast at 5 and 35 past, travel news at 25 and 55 past which, from 1990, saw split travel bulletins aired so that the London area received a separate bulletin from the rest of the country. One was broadcast live, the other recorded during the preceding record. And a brief sports update, read by Mayo, aired at around 20 past.

== Features ==
The programme became known for various features, including On This Day in History, the cryptic game The Identik-Hit Quiz, where Mayo and his co hosts would 'act' a short scene which cryptically led listeners to the title of a hit song, and in August 1990 he launched his Confessions feature where members of the public sought absolution for their (often frivolous or humorous) "sins". Mayo continued with the Confessions when he moved to the mid-morning programme in 1993, and in 1995 it became a television series.

Monday's programme featured a rundown of the new UK Top 40 singles chart which was followed by a playing of that week's number one. This was broadcast at approximately 7.45am.

== Break-out Hits ==
Due to frequent plays from Mayo, several unlikely hit singles reached the UK charts, including "Kinky Boots" by Patrick Macnee and Honor Blackman "Donald Where's Yer Troosers?" by Andy Stewart; and "Always Look on the Bright Side of Life", sung and written by Eric Idle. For helping Monty Python have a hit with the latter 13 years after it first appeared on the soundtrack to The Life of Brian, Idle presented Mayo with a model bare foot, in the style of the animated version which used to end the opening titles to the TV show.
