= Morning zoo =

Format of morning radio show

Morning zoo is a format of morning radio show common to English-language radio broadcasting. The name is derived from the wackiness and zaniness of the activities, segments, and overall personality of the show and its hosts. The morning zoo concept and name is most often deployed on Top 40 (CHR) radio stations.

A morning zoo typically consists of two or more radio personalities, usually capable of spontaneous comic interaction as well as competent delivery of news and service elements. Most morning zoo programs involve scripted or live telephone calls, on-air games, and regular contests.

== History ==
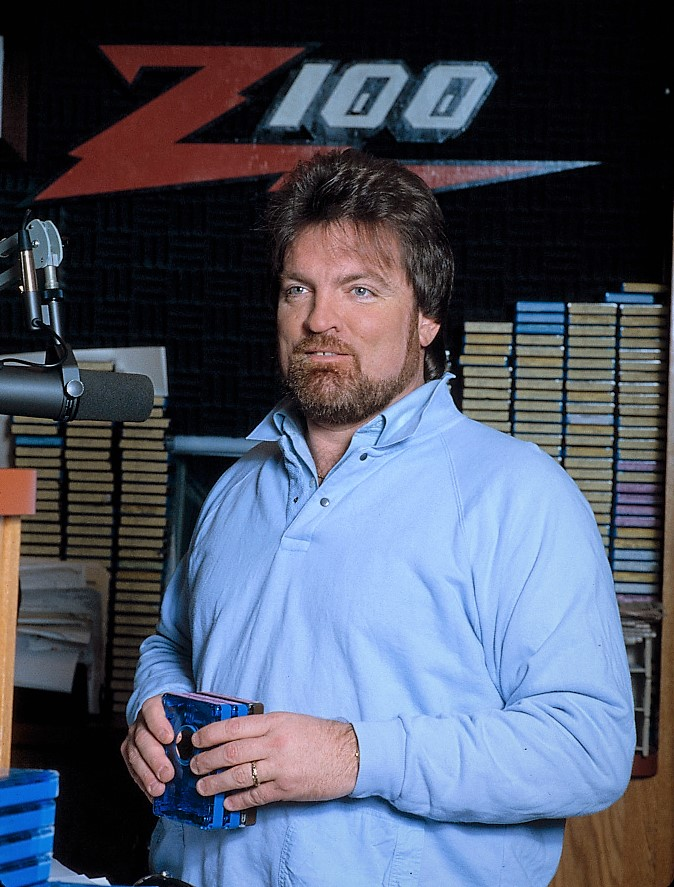
Scott Shannon in 1985

The first morning zoo program, focusing on the zany interactions of two hosts, was conceived and performed in 1981 by Scott Shannon and Cleveland Wheeler of WRBQ-FM in Tampa, Florida, known at the time as Q105 FM. Wheeler had been serving as the personality DJ hosting the morning drive program for the station's previous four years. Shannon was the new operations manager in January 1981. The two decided to break with tradition and work up a wilder show together, founded on their own playful, irreverent and provocative interaction, with spontaneous bits of parody and comedy leavened with straight news. They called the show the Q Morning Zoo, and it quickly became a hit. At its height it had 85 people working to produce it.

In July 1983, Shannon left Tampa to reinvent WHTZ "Z-100" in the New York City market, based out of Secaucus, New Jersey. On August 2, Shannon hosted the first Z Morning Zoo at WHTZ, soon settling into a team which included straight man Ross Brittain, newscaster Claire Stevens, public service director Professor Jonathan B. Bell, 22-year-old "Captain" Kevin on the phones, and production manager J. R. Nelson. Shannon's popular new format brought WHTZ from last place to first in just 74 days, and put longtime ratings champion morning DJ Don Imus in second place. When WHTZ proved a huge success, the name and format of the "Morning Zoo" was copied by stations across the US.

John Gorman was a program director at Cleveland rock station WMMS when they adopted the morning zoo concept in early 1984. Gorman traced the sequence of events:

We borrowed the 'Morning Zoo' moniker from our New York sister station Z-100, which borrowed it from WRBQ in Tampa, which borrowed it from a station in Australia.

Tampa's WRBQ continued to run the morning zoo show after Shannon left; Wheeler teamed with Terrence McKeever and others to keep the show a success. Other US stations that adopted the morning zoo program in the early-to-mid-1980s include KKBQ-FM in Houston in 1982, WRVQ in Richmond, Virginia, in April 1983, WNIC with the Harper & Gannon show by early 1983, KMEL in San Francisco in early 1984, KFMB-FM in San Diego, California, by late 1984, WZOU in Boston by November 1984, WGTZ "Z-93" in Dayton, Ohio in March 1985, WKPE-FM in Orleans, Massachusetts in early 1985, WKRQ "Q102" and WEBN's Dawn Patrol in Cincinnati by October 1985, and WNVZ in Norfolk, Virginia in September 1985, among others.

== Shows ==
In Australia, the morning zoo format was heard on Triple M as The Cage, amongst other stations, including SAFM in Adelaide, whose version of the morning zoo was the highest rating breakfast show there between 1985 and 1990.

The Don and Mike show originated as a morning zoo show at WAVA-FM in the 1980s, and retained some elements of the format.

In Vancouver, British Columbia, LG73 (call sign CKLG) adopted this format for its popular morning program, led by Dean Hill, from 1985 to 1993.

In Quebec City, CJMF-FM 93.3 had Le Zoo du 93 from 1985 to 1990. Not only does the show still hold a number of records in terms of ratings and market shares (a quarter-hour of 148,000 listeners), but it also skyrocketed the station to now unreachable numbers, with 573,200 listeners on a weekly basis (according to the BBM summer 1987 survey).

Steve Wright introduced the format to the UK when in 1981 he started his Steve Wright in the Afternoon show on BBC Radio 1 which featured his "posse" of co-presenters and features. Chris Moyles and Comedy Dave also used the zoo format. Their audience was measured at eight million listeners by RAJAR, and Simon Mayo also revolutionized British radio by introducing the format when on 23 May 1988 he took over Radio 1 Breakfast from Mike Smith on BBC Radio 1 which also featured co-presenters including news anchor Rod McKenzie and sidekick weather and travel girls, including Carol Dooley, Sybil Ruscoe, Jackie Brambles and Dianne Oxberry, and the show's producer Ric Blaxill who made regular speaking contributions. The programme also became known for various features, including On This Day In History, the long-running cryptic game The Identik-Hit Quiz, where Mayo and his co hosts would 'act' a short scene which cryptically led listeners to the title of a hit song, and also his Confessions feature where members of the public sought absolution for their (often frivolous or humorous) "sins".

The format is used on stations of many different genres. Even Christian radio stations such as WAWZ in New Jersey have a morning zoo. It also inspired Channel 4's breakfast television show The Big Breakfast.

Dayton, Ohio, Classic Hits radio station WZLR reunited Dr. Dave Gross and Wild Bill originally from the Z Morning Zoo on WGTZ in Dayton. The show is now called The Eagle Morning Zoo.

== See also ==
- Shock jock
- Elvis Duran and the Morning Show – most-listened-to US "morning zoo"
- Mojo in the Morning, Detroit morning zoo
