= Simon Mayo Drivetime =

- Other names: Drivetime From Radio 2 (2010-18) The Simon Mayo Drivetime Show (2021-)
- Genre: Music, Talk
- Running time: 2 hours (2010—2018); 3 hours (2021—present)
- Country of origin: United Kingdom
- Language: English
- Home station: BBC Radio 2 (2010—2018); Greatest Hits Radio (2021—present)
- Hosted by: Simon Mayo
- Starring: Matt Williams; Nigel Barden
- Executive producer: Gareth James
- Recording studio: Wogan House, London (2010-18) №1 Golden Square, London (2021—2024); The Lantern, Euston, London (2024-present)
- Original release: 11 January 2010 – present
- Audio format: DAB digital radio, TV and online, FM
- Opening theme: Enjoy Yourself by Prince Buster and Jools Holland
- Ending theme: As opening (2010-18)
- Website: Official GHR Website
- Podcast: The Weekly Mayo; Simon Mayo's Confessions

Simon Mayo Drivetime is the incarnation of the drivetime show on BBC Radio 2 between 11 January 2010 and 4 May 2018, being revived briefly for Mayo's final show with the station on 21 December that year, and then fully from 15 March 2021 on Greatest Hits Radio it is based on a "zoo" format. It is broadcast on weekdays from 16:00 to 19:00 in the United Kingdom. It is presented by broadcaster Simon Mayo, who originally moved to BBC Radio 2's drivetime from his weekday afternoon show on BBC Radio 5 Live after Chris Evans moved to take over the Radio 2 Breakfast Show.

On 10 January 2018, the BBC announced that Jo Whiley would become Mayo's co-host from 14 May. The drivetime show would also be extended to 8pm (being cut back an hour to make room for Tony Blackburn's Golden Hour every Friday from 7pm.) The final regular show was broadcast on Thursday 3 May 2018, with the show officially ending with All Request Friday the following day. The new show was not a success, with Mayo announcing his departure from the station on 22 October that year. They presented their last show together on 20 December, with Mayo hosting solo the following day, marking the end of his 17-year stint at the station. He revived the theme music and jingles used in this incarnation of the programme.

In February 2021, it was announced that Mayo would be reviving the show on the Bauer-owned Greatest Hits Radio from 15 March 2021, with several of the original production staff and Mayo's co-presenters Matt Williams and Nigel Barden also returning.

== Co-Presenting Team ==
=== Matt Williams ===
Matt Williams was the sports reporter on the show, presenting Matt's World of Sport at 17:50 and 18:50 each day. On Fridays, in the second report he interviewed somebody who is involved in a sport that is not regularly reported in the general media, known as the Friday Fixture. He also announced the weekly rock tune on Wednesdays as "Doctor Mosh", as well as participating in the daily confessions as 'Brother Matt'. He returned for the revived show in 2021.

=== Bobbie Pryor ===
Bobbie Pryor is the regular weekday afternoon travel reporter on BBC Radio 2, and read the travel news at 17:15, 17:55, 18:30 and 18:55 each day. Pryor was previously the weekend travel reporter but from 11 August 2014 became the regular weekday afternoon travel reporter, replacing Sally Boazman who moved to weekends. She participated in the daily confessions as 'Sister Bobbie'.

=== Nigel Barden ===
Radio 2's resident chef, who cooked for the team every Thursday. He participated in Thursday's confessions as 'Novice Nigel'. He returned on the revived show in 2021.

=== Sally Boazman ===
Sally Boazman was the regular travel reporter on the show, Boazman was known as 'Mother Superior' in the daily confessions. but in August 2014 made the move to weekends on BBC Radio 2. Due to holidays, her final show with Mayo was on 24 July 2014, but her last report for weekdays was on 8 August 2014.

=== Alan Dedicoat ===
Alan Dedicoat was the regular newsreader and continuity announcer on BBC Radio 2, who read the 17:00 news occasionally, coming into the show. He also occasionally participated in the daily confession, Dedicoat retired from newsreading and continuity announcing duties on BBC Radio 2 on Friday 27 March 2015, but briefly returned on Monday 30 March 2015 for one final confession.

=== Rebecca Pike ===
Rebecca Pike presented the business news at 17:30 and 18:40 every day, and at the end of the 17:30 bulletin also reports on the FTSE market data and exchange rates. On Fridays she interviewed a guest with a new invention, known as the Innovation Slot. Pike was known as 'Sister Rebecca' when participating in the daily confessions, She left the programme and the station on 17 December 2015.

=== Suzi Purdie ===
Current producer Suzi Purdie joins in with the show every day, joining in with the Drivetime Drama and taking part in the daily Confessions as 'Sister Suzi'

=== Holly Carnegie ===
Assistant Producer Holly Carnegie joins in with the show every day, joining in with the Drivetime Drama and taking part in the daily Confessions as 'Sister Holly'

=== Stand-in Presenters ===
Stand-in presenters on the Radio 2 incarnation of the show included Patrick Kielty, Liza Tarbuck, Ryan Tubridy, Richard Allinson, Richard Bacon, Mark Goodier, Sara Cox and Amol Rajan, stand-in hosts on the Greatest Hits Radio version of the show are Richard Allinson, Jackie Brambles, Kate Thornton, Andy Crane, Alex Lester, and Mark Goodier.

== Show Features ==
The show's opening and closing theme tune is a 2003 recording by Jools Holland and Prince Buster of the 1948 song "Enjoy Yourself (It's Later than You Think)" by Carl Sigman and Herb Magidson. Before the theme plays, a re-written, a cappella version of "Day-O (The Banana Boat Song)" by Harry Belafonte played, with "Day-O, me say Day-O" replaced with "Mayo, Simon Mayo". Previously, some editions of the show also used the 1950 hit version by Guy Lombardo and his Royal Canadians, or occasionally the version by The Specials from their 1980 album More Specials.

The instrumental "Garden Party" by Mezzoforte was used as a backing track during one of the show's features.

=== Monday-Thursday Regular Features ===
- Three Word-ers: Listeners sent in a summary of their day in no more than three words, which were read out sporadically throughout the show. There was also a "talking text service" where listeners read out their three word-er live on air. This feature continues on Scala Radio and later Greatest Hits Radio
- The Oldies: A selection of five or six songs all related to a particular topic relevant to that day's events were played throughout the show, chosen by readers of the show's blog and followers of the show's official Twitter and Facebook accounts.
- "Subject" Guest: At around 17:20, a guest was introduced and they discuss an issue raised in the previous day's show, or in the news on that day. The guest was generally an expert in the subject area under discussion. The music used in this section was usually an instrumental version of Ray LaMontagne's "Repo Man" from his 2010 album God Willin' & the Creek Don't Rise, although occasionally the theme to children's sci-fi series Joe 90 was used.
- Homework Sucks: Listeners were invited to send in questions to see if other listeners could answer them. These could be any form of question, and two or three per day were selected to be answered (to varying degrees of success) by the general public. Previously, only one question was selected per show with a definitive answer provided by an academic or other expert in whatever subject area the question relates to. The original premise of the feature was that it was only open to children wanting help with their homework (hence the title) but was soon expanded to general questions from anyone. The music used in this section was Chicken Man by Alan Hawkshaw, best known in the UK as the theme tune to children's school-based drama Grange Hill. Latterly the interview with an expert was dropped and three potential answers from listeners were read out. During this time the feature was also known as The Radio 2 Search Engine or Twoogle.
- Confessions: Carried on from Mayo's previous radio shows on BBC Radio 1. listeners sent in embarrassing or funny stories about their injuring, or playing practical jokes on people, that they never owned up to at the time they happened, but which Mayo still broadcasts to the nation over Tomaso Giovanni Albinoni's Adagio for Organ and Strings in G minor. Mayo's co-presenters offered forgiveness (or not, as the case may be) before listeners were invited to text or email in their verdicts on the story, some of which were read out over the course of the rest of the show. The confessions from the week were compiled into a weekly podcast, released on Fridays. This feature continues on Scala Radio and later Greatest Hits Radio.
- Celebrity Guests: On most days, the show invited a celebrity guests during the second hour of the show (when it was not taken up by Nigel Barden's food slot, or the Book Club), often to plug a newly released film, TV series or book.
- The Drivetime Live Sessions: Occasionally, an artist or band would perform a number of their tracks live in the studio. In between songs, they were interviewed by Mayo.
- The Radio 2 Book Club: (fortnightly, Mondays) An author was interviewed about a recently published book that they had written, and the team reviewed and discussed the book. Listeners also sent in their reviews, and a preview chapter was usually uploaded onto the show's webpage.
- Tunesday: (fortnightly, Tuesdays) In lieu of a guest, the half-hour between 18:00 and 18:30 was given over to songs over 5 minutes long that aren't usually played on the radio in their full length versions. Listeners sent in suggestions for tracks and 3 or 4 are played. This feature continues on Greatest Hits Radio.
- Foodie Thursday: (weekly, Thursdays) The show's resident chef, Nigel Barden, cooked the team some (sometimes unusual) dishes. This feature continues on Greatest Hits Radio.
- Matt's Middle-Aged Midweek Mosh: (weekly, Wednesdays) Sports reporter (and rock fan) Matt Williams announced a weekly classic rock record, played at around 18:45, and encouraged everyone listening to act as if they were in a mosh pit, and "rock out".
- The Showstopper: Listeners were invited to email in their suggestions for the last song to be played on the show, which was in the same musical genre as the specialist music show following Drivetime on any particular day. Previously, a listener vote decided the choice but this was replaced in September 2012 with the later system. The different genres were:
  - Monday – Rhythm and blues (preceding Paul Jones, later Cerys Matthews)
  - Tuesday – Jazz (preceding Jamie Cullum)
  - Wednesday – Folk (preceding Mike Harding, later Mark Radcliffe)
  - Thursday – Country (preceding Bob Harris)
- All-Request Rollover: From Monday-Thursday the show featured a listener who didn't manage to get on the Friday All-Request show with their chosen song as a 'rollover' from Friday's show.
- Secret Santana: Every year, in the run up to Christmas the team played a round of 'Secret Santana' in which Mayo got one of the presenters or guests to pick a name out of the 'Secret Santana Fez' to randomly choose a track to play by Carlos Santana.
- Brucie Bonus: For the first three months of 2015, every show featured at least one track by Bruce Springsteen. The name is a reference to one of British TV host Bruce Forsyth's many catchphrases from Play Your Cards Right. This feature continues on Greatest Hits Radio.
- Facts of the Day: After the news at 6 o'clock, humorous "facts of the day" were read relating to the specialist subject area of each of Mayo, Williams and Pike. Each fact had its own title relating to the content of the fact. This feature was dropped in spring 2015.
- The Quiz: At around 18:35 Mayo, Pike and Williams quizzed each other on their respective specialist subjects, and a score was kept throughout the week. The music used in this feature is a 1970 cha-cha-chá rendition of The Doors' "Light My Fire" by Edmundo Ros and his Orchestra. This feature was dropped during the summer of 2015.
- Drivetime Drama: At about 16:45, a 20-30 second long clip of recordings of Simon, Matt and Suzi's voices is played - usually playing various characters, and a song title is enciphered within the aforementioned clip. At 17:10, three callers are selected at random to try and decipher the song title within the clip, and if they guess correctly they win the 'glorious' (according to Mayo) prize of a given number of people to give a shoutout to, doubled every day. The song title is usually a pun.
- Simon's Big 45: A song is played that is not on the regular Greatest Hits Radio playlist.
- Three Steps to Seven: The final three songs of the show are the official UK or US Billboard top three from any given day within the 70s, 80s or 90s, owing to GHR's remit.
- Album Of The Week: A song per day is played from a given popular album released in the month the show is broadcast in history.
- 6:24/34 Dance Floor: One or two upbeat disco or dance songs are played at either 6:24 or :34 (give or take a couple of minutes).

=== All-Request Friday ===
To allow Mayo time to continue to present Kermode and Mayo's Film Review on 5Live and following on from Chris Evans' Drivetime show, on Fridays all records played were chosen by the listeners – hence the name. The regular features from Mondays-Thursdays did not appear. Regular background music used on Fridays included "On the Rebound" by Floyd Cramer, "Tom Hark" by The Piranhas, "A Swingin' Safari" by Bert Kaempfert, "Giorgio by Moroder" by Daft Punk, "House of the King" by Focus, and “Never Going Back Again” by Fleetwood Mac as well as other stock instrumentals in different musical styles.

- Mah Nà Mah Nà: A regular song on All Request Friday was the 1976 Muppets version of Piero Umiliani's "Mah Nà Mah Nà" (although the version played was the remastered version from the soundtrack to the 2011 film The Muppets). Introduced as "that song", it was usually the second track played on the show. This feature continues on Greatest Hits Radio.
- Friday Fixture: In his 18:50 bulletin, sports reporter Matt Williams had the Friday Fixture where a participant in an "obscure" sport (i.e. one which is not widely reported in the media) was interviewed.

== Special shows ==
Occasionally there was a special edition of the show, covering special events in the UK. Such events included pre-show coverage of the BBC Radio 2 Folk Awards, a fortnight of special shows for the London 2012 Olympics and a special programme from the Science Museum in London to commemorate the BBC's 90th anniversary on 14 November 2012.

== Other media ==
=== Podcasts ===
As with several other shows across BBC Radio, highlights from the show were released as a podcast, which could be downloaded from the BBC's website and from other sources (such as iTunes). Two weekly podcasts were produced, both released on Fridays. The Weekly Mayo featured highlights of the interviews from the preceding week, whilst Simon Mayo's Confessions was a collection of the confessions.

=== Books ===
Two books have been released by Bantam Press, both based on features from the show. The first, Confessions, was released on 13 October 2011 featuring a collection of the best confessions featured on the programme, and the second, entitled Homework Sucks!, was released a year later on 11 October 2012 featuring a selection of the "Homework Sucks" questions and answers.

=== Album ===
An album featuring a selection of live tracks performed on the show, alongside other tracks picked by Mayo was released on 24 February 2014.

==== Track listing ====
CD 1
| No. | Title | Artist | Length |
|---|---|---|---|
| 1. | "Ho Hey" | The Lumineers | 2:44 |
| 2. | "Counting Stars" | OneRepublic | 4:16 |
| 3. | "Candy" | Robbie Williams | 3:20 |
| 4. | "Home Again" | Elton John | 4:59 |
| 5. | "Red" | Taylor Swift | 3:40 |
| 6. | "Never Tear Us Apart" | Paloma Faith | 3:04 |
| 7. | "Beneath Your Beautiful" | Labrinth feat. Emeli Sandé | 3:57 |
| 8. | "Tangled Up" | Caro Emerald | 3:16 |
| 9. | "Forever Autumn" | Jeff Wayne feat. Liam Neeson and Gary Barlow | 7:55 |
| 10. | "Home" | Gabrielle Aplin | 4:06 |
| 11. | "L.I.F.E.G.O.E.S.O.N." | Noah & The Whale | 3:46 |
| 12. | "Broken" | Jake Bugg | 4:07 |
| 13. | "Only Love" | Ben Howard | 3:48 |
| 14. | "Payphone" | Maroon 5 | 3:43 |
| 15. | "Shout" | Tears for Fears | 4:04 |
| 16. | "Fill My Little World" | The Feeling | 3:39 |
| 17. | "The Love Cats" | The Cure | 3:39 |
| 18. | "Somewhere Only We Know (Note: Drivetime live session version)" | Keane | 3:47 |
| 19. | "Feel" | Robbie Williams | 4:01 |
| 20. | "Wild Wood" | Paul Weller | 3:57 |
| Total length: | | | 72:51 |

CD 2
| No. | Title | Artist | Length |
|---|---|---|---|
| 1. | "Pride (In the Name of Love)" | U2 | 3:49 |
| 2. | "Let Me Go" | Gary Barlow | 3:40 |
| 3. | "Called Out in the Dark" | Snow Patrol | 3:28 |
| 4. | "Indian Summer" | Stereophonics | 4:26 |
| 5. | "All I Wanna Do" | Sheryl Crow | 4:33 |
| 6. | "Just Give Me a Reason" | P!nk feat. Nate Ruess | 4:03 |
| 7. | "Army of Two" | Olly Murs | 3:45 |
| 8. | "Video Games" | Lana Del Rey | 4:02 |
| 9. | "Alive and Kicking" | Simple Minds | 4:46 |
| 10. | "Human" | The Killers | 4:06 |
| 11. | "Turn Back the Hands of Time" | Mick Hucknall | 2:37 |
| 12. | "Suddenly I See" | KT Tunstall | 3:12 |
| 13. | "Love is the Drug" | Roxy Music | 4:07 |
| 14. | "Why Does It Always Rain on Me?" | Travis | 4:25 |
| 15. | "Dignity" | Deacon Blue | 3:59 |
| 16. | "Weather with You" | Crowded House | 3:46 |
| 17. | "Life in a Northern Town" | Sugarland | 3:52 |
| 18. | "Babies" | Noah & The Whale | 4:01 |
| 19. | "Knockin' on Heaven's Door" | The Pierces | 3:31 |
| 20. | "We Are Never Ever Getting Back Together" | Taylor Swift | 3:21 |
| Total length: | | | 77:29 |

CD 3
| No. | Title | Artist | Length |
|---|---|---|---|
| 1. | "The Man Who Can't Be Moved" | The Script | 4:01 |
| 2. | "Greatest Day" | Take That | 3:57 |
| 3. | "Silenced By the Night" | Keane | 3:16 |
| 4. | "If I Die Young" | The Band Perry | 3:43 |
| 5. | "Drops of Jupiter" | Train | 4:20 |
| 6. | "That Don't Impress Me Much" | Shania Twain | 4:01 |
| 7. | "Say What You Want" | Texas | 3:50 |
| 8. | "Don't Stop the Dance" | Bryan Ferry | 3:58 |
| 9. | "Call Me" | Blondie | 3:32 |
| 10. | "It Must Be Love" | Madness | 3:21 |
| 11. | "Secret Smile" | Semisonic | 3:45 |
| 12. | "Johnny Got a Boom Boom" | Imelda May | 2:58 |
| 13. | "Some Nights" | Fun. | 4:00 |
| 14. | "When You Really Loved Someone" | Agnetha Fältskog | 3:31 |
| 15. | "Edge of Something" | Jamie Cullum | 4:41 |
| 16. | "Enjoy Yourself (It's Later Than You Think)" | Jools Holland and Prince Buster | 3:03 |
| 17. | "It's My Life" | Bon Jovi | 3:47 |
| 18. | "Labelled with Love" | Squeeze | 4:28 |
| 19. | "Give It All Up " | Amy Macdonald | 3:31 |
| 20. | "Shame" | Gary Barlow and Robbie Williams | 3:48 |
| Total length: | | | 75:33 |

== Awards ==
The show won the title of Best Music Programme in the 2011 Sony Radio Academy Awards.

== See also ==
- Chris Evans Drivetime
