= Janice Long =

English broadcaster and disc jockey (1955–2021)

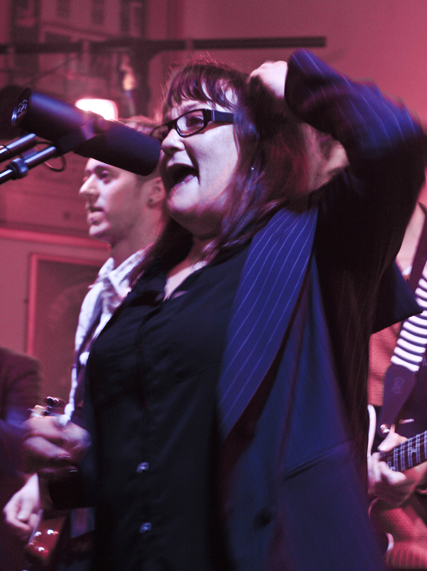
- Long on stage in 2012
- Born: Janice Chegwin; 5 April 1955; Liverpool, England
- Died: 25 December 2021 (aged 66)
- Occupation: Radio presenter
- Years active: 1979–2021
- Spouses: Trevor Long (m. 1977; div. 1982); Paul Berry (m. 2017)
- Children: 2
- Relatives: Keith Chegwin (brother)

Janice Berry (née Chegwin; 5 April 1955 – 25 December 2021), known professionally by her first married name Janice Long, was an English broadcaster who was best known for her work in British music radio. The first female presenter to have a daily music show on BBC Radio 1, Long also appeared on other BBC Radio stations, such as BBC Radio 2, BBC Radio London, BBC Radio WM, and BBC Radio 6 Music, and was the first female regular presenter on the television chart show Top of the Pops, beginning in 1982.

Between 2005 and 2021, Long was the Presenter of Moseley Folk and Arts Festival. At the end of her career, Long hosted four nights a week on BBC Radio Wales and Saturday afternoons on Greatest Hits Radio.

== Early life ==
Janice Chegwin was born on 5 April 1955 at Liverpool Maternity Hospital, to Margaret (née Wells) and Colin Chegwin, who encouraged their three children to pursue an interest in stage performance. Her younger brother, Keith Chegwin (1957–2017), likewise had a career in radio and television.

Her early employment included two years at Laker Airways as cabin crew, and also as a shop assistant, in telesales and as an insurance clerk. In July 1978, Long and husband Trevor won the premiere of 3-2-1, a Yorkshire Television game show.

== Broadcasting ==
=== Early career ===
Long became a station assistant at BBC Radio Merseyside in Liverpool in 1979.

Shortly afterwards she started presenting her own show Streetlife for the station on Sunday evenings, focusing on local bands in the thriving Liverpool music scene. Frankie Goes to Hollywood did their first radio session for her show. After interviewing Paul Gambaccini for her new afternoon show, the latter recommended her to BBC Radio 1.

=== BBC Radio 1 and television ===
Long joined BBC Radio 1 in 1982, making her debut on 4 December with her own Saturday evening show from 7:30 pm to 10 pm, after being presented as one of the three 'newcomers' on BBC1's chart show Top of the Pops two nights earlier. From 1984 to 1987 she presented the Monday–Thursday evenings from 7:30 pm to 10 pm, a mix of new music and current affairs, and record review programme Singled Out on Friday evenings from 5:45 pm to 7 pm from 1986 to 1987. She was the first woman to have her own daily show on BBC Radio 1. On television, Long was a regular presenter of Top of the Pops between January 1983 and August 1988, and was the first woman to become a regular host. She often presented it in partnership with John Peel (after the departure of David Jensen), with whom she struck up a solid friendship. Long returned to co-present the final show in July 2006.

In 2021, Long was among a number of ex-Radio 1 DJs hired by Viacom International Studios to countdown the Official Charts Company's retro hits of the year on Channel 5's Britain's Favourite Songs, with Long first being heard on the 1982 episode which also featured Toyah Willcox, Paul Gambaccini and Clare Grogan.

=== BBC Radio London, Radio 5 and XFM ===
In 1989, she joined London station BBC Radio London (then known as Greater London Radio), taking over from Nick Abbot on the breakfast show. At the time GLR was being run by future BBC Radio 1 controller Matthew Bannister and future Radio 1 executive Trevor Dann. Long left the breakfast show but continued to work for the station, where she took over a weekend show. In addition to this, she was heard presenting and producing occasional shows on the old BBC Radio 5. Long became involved with XFM in London when it had a restricted service licence (RSL), and played a crucial part in its bid for a permanent licence.

=== Crash FM ===
In 1995, Long moved back up to Liverpool, where she set up a radio station called Crash FM with Bernie Connor. The idea for an alternative music radio station in Liverpool was thought up by Long and Connor in 1994, with the pair having the idea that the station could be the city's answer to XFM. The station was launched on a restricted service licence (RSL) broadcasting for a month from 5 November 1995 at Mabel Fletcher College on Greenbank, and with presenters such as Inspiral Carpets member Clint Boon getting their first radio presenting jobs.

Over the next few years, the station received support from Bob Geldof, Boy George and Primal Scream amongst others, and successfully bid for a permanent licence on 107.6FM.

=== BBC Radio 2 ===
In 1999, Long started appearing on BBC Radio 2, presenting a Saturday afternoon show from 3 pm to 6 pm. In April 2000, she began as a weekday presenter, hosting the show originally from Birmingham and then (from April 2008) from BBC Radio 2 studios in London. Long promoted a number of acts through live music sessions on her show including Adele, The Zutons, Primal Scream, Kasabian, Amy Macdonald, Hard-Fi, Faithless, The Manic Street Preachers, Marillion, Josh Ritter, The Stranglers, Paul Weller, Moby, The Dandy Warhols, Stereophonics, Aslan and a significant number of new and unsigned bands such as Elle S'Appelle, Vijay Kishore, Damien Dempsey, Senses and Sam Isaac. Amy Winehouse performed her first radio session after Long was the first presenter to give her airtime.

In January 2010, due to a reorganisation of the breakfast schedule on Radio 2, her show was cut to two hours, and ran from midnight to 2 am, Monday to Friday. At the time Long was earning £137,000 a year.

With the announcement of the new After Midnight programme on Radio 2 from October 2014, the show was on Mondays to Thursdays, midnight to 3 am. Long left her regular BBC Radio 2 slot after further changes to its schedule. Her final After Midnight show was on 26 January 2017.

She returned to BBC Radio 2 standing in for Jo Whiley for a week commencing 10 April 2017, and was given her own series called A Long Walk With... which went out between 2017 and 2018.

=== A Long Walk With... ===
A Long Walk With... was an hour long series of interviews initially broadcast on BBC Radio 2 from 9 August 2017 at 10pm. Each week, Long walked through the streets of a different city with a popstar from the 1980s or 1990s as they remembered the key places, characters and music that shaped their pop career. The first series featured Holly Johnson's Liverpool, Alison Moyet's Basildon, Richard Hawley's Sheffield and a walk through west London with Gary Numan. The second series was broadcast on Thursdays at 9pm in 2018 with Jim Kerr, Chris Difford, James Dean Bradfield, and Tracey Thorn being the popstars featured.

=== BBC Radio 6 Music ===
From the station's founding and launch in 2002 to 2004 Long presented Dream Ticket on BBC Radio 6 Music, which aired from 10 pm to midnight five days a week, with a Saturday and Sunday early morning follow-up from 6 am to 8 am.

=== BBC Radio WM and BBC Radio Wales ===
As well as a daily show on BBC Radio 2, Long presented for a time on BBC Radio WM on Saturday mornings from 9 am to noon, but left in July 2010. On 28 March 2017 the BBC announced that she would start presenting a new evening show on BBC Radio Wales from 22 May, airing Mondays to Thursdays from 7:00pm–10:00pm.

She took time away from the programme from 11 December 2017 following the death of her younger brother, Keith Chegwin. Adam Walton stood in for Long during her absence. She returned to the show on 18 December 2017.

Long presented her final show on BBC Radio Wales on 9 December 2021 and Adam Walton presented the station's tribute show to Long on 27 December 2021.

=== Greatest Hits Radio ===
In January 2019, Long joined Bauer Radio when their 'Bauer City 2' stations were rebranded as Greatest Hits Radio. In addition to her show on BBC Radio Wales, Long started a Saturday afternoon show, 1pm-4pm, on Greatest Hits Radio, and on AM and FM across the UK as part of the Bauer Media brand. Long's show was broadcast from the Radio City Tower in Liverpool, amid schedule changes at the station that saw the hiring of a number of BBC Radio presenters like Alex Lester, Simon Mayo, Mark Goodier, Matt Williams, Richard Allinson, Pat Sharp, Ken Bruce, Jackie Brambles, and Paul Gambaccini.

==== Remembering Janice ====
The station's tribute show to Long (called Remembering Janice) was broadcast from 1pm to 4pm on New Year's Day 2022 and was presented by Alex Lester, who also contributed his reminiscences to the show. The programme featured audio archive from Top of the Pops, BBC Radio 1, BBC Radio 2, and Live Aid, contributions from her husband and widower Paul and radio colleagues such as Richard Allinson, Paul Gambaccini, Mark Goodier, Jackie Brambles and Simon Mayo, as well as contributions from musicians, including Stephen Duffy, Frankie Goes To Hollywood's Nasher and Carl Hunter from The Farm. In addition to GHR's tribute on 1 January 2022, a BBC Radio 2, BBC Radio Wales and BBC Radio Merseyside simulcast tribute programme called Janice Long: A Life In Music was broadcast on 23 January 2022.

=== Other work ===
Long appeared on The X Factor, Countdown and The Biography Channel, and provided the voiceover for the documentary Desperate Midwives on BBC Three television channel. She was one of the personalities at Live Aid in July 1985, in which she mainly interviewed the performers backstage. In the mid-1990s, she presented a programme on the BBC World Service, which was a mix of science and popular music called Pop Science.

Long won the DJ celebrity special of quiz show The Weakest Link, shown on BBC One on 5 September 2009. She also presented The Janice Long Review Show on Vintage TV and The 2ube on local TV station Made in Liverpool.

== Honours ==
In 2016, the British Academy of Songwriters, Composers and Authors presented Long with a Gold Badge award for her contribution to the music industry. She received an honorary doctorate from Edge Hill University, West Lancashire, in 2018, in recognition of her commitment to music. The same year, she was featured in the Royal College of Art’s First Women UK exhibition, celebrating 100 pioneering 21st-century British women.

Long was a patron of the Liverpool Institute for Performing Arts.

== Personal life and death ==
In 1977 Janice married Trevor Long in Liverpool; they divorced in 1982. The couple appeared as winning contestants on the first edition of Yorkshire Television's game show 3-2-1 in 1978.

In her early days at Radio 1 she entered a relationship with fellow DJ Peter Powell which lasted from October 1984 to July 1985. From 1987 until her death, she was in a relationship with Paul Berry; they married in September 2017 and had two children.

Long died at the Queen Elizabeth Hospital Birmingham from pneumonia on 25 December 2021, at the age of 66, surrounded by her family.

Many musicians and fellow broadcasters paid tribute to Long. BBC Radio 1 DJ Greg James said, "She picked the greats and got them in session before other DJs had even heard of them", while James's colleague Adele Roberts said Long had forged a path for women; television presenter Carol Vorderman wrote on Twitter, "Rest In Music lovely vibrant trailblazer Janice Long”. Peter Hook of the band New Order said she was "always a great friend", while Tim Burgess, frontman of The Charlatans, praised Long for her support of fledgling bands.
