= Confessions (radio programme) =

Confessions is an ongoing popular feature which first appeared on the BBC Radio 1 weekday breakfast show in the early 1990s, devised by its host, Simon Mayo.

Mayo, who had hosted the show since 1988, started the feature in August 1990, partly due to the rising interest in his own Christian faith, and it caught on very quickly. Listeners would write in to "Father Mayo" and "confess" to their "sins", and each morning at 8:35 am Mayo would broadcast one to the nation over Tomaso Giovanni Albinoni's Adagio for Organ and Strings in G minor.

The "confessions" were often humorous and sometimes lacking in taste or scruples. At the peak of the feature, Mayo received more than one hundred confessions a week. Some were sincere confessions and Mayo discounted any which admitted to crime, adultery, overt cruelty or other more serious activities.

Infamous confessions included:

- A family who put some herbs into a Christmas pudding which had been sent to them by relatives in Australia, only to discover later they were a late uncle's ashes (based on an urban myth)
- A man who, desperate to urinate on a train with no toilet, decided to do so out of a window, only to inadvertently spray numerous people waiting on a platform which suddenly appeared
- A man who, tired of his flatmate's complaining about food wastage, cooked a pie for him before replacing the meat with raw cat food
- A woman who, annoyed with her boyfriend's lateness in coming home for his evening meal, spread chili con carne all over his sports car
- A man who found some negatives of his brother's wife in the nude and had them developed before sending them to an adult magazine's Readers' Wives section
- A Gulf War logistics corporal put some "fallen off the back of a lorry glasses under his truck. New owner got bomb disposal out thinking it was an IED."

After completing each confession, Mayo would ask his crew - consisting of weather and travel presenter Dianne Oxberry, newsreader Rod McKenzie, or their respective stand-ins if they were away, and the day's "special guest producer" played by the show's own producer Ric Blaxill - whether they would "forgive" the confessor or not.

Some confessions prompted complaints from listeners, especially if they involved particularly cruel behaviour towards others or any that involved living creatures, even if there was no hint of animal cruelty in the confession.

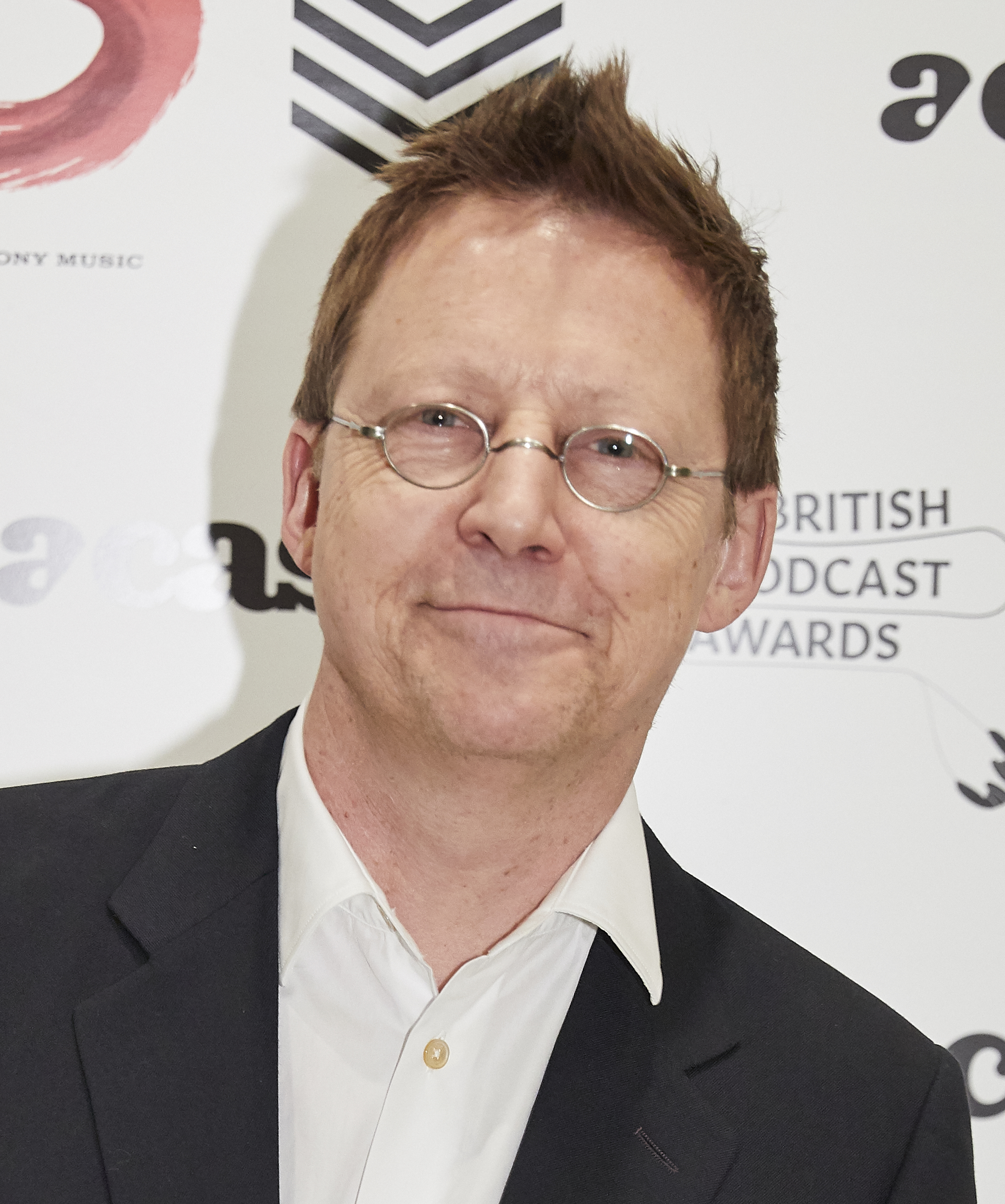
Simon Mayo in 2018

The feature was a huge success. Word spread internationally and a story made the front page of The Wall Street Journal, with Mayo often being asked if he was "trying to challenge the power and principles of various religions".

Confessions spawned a successful spin-off book and, later, a Saturday night BBC television series which ran from 1995 to 1998, which was criticised by the Broadcasting Standards Council.

Mayo revived Confessions on his Radio 1 mid-morning programme which ran from 25 October 1993 to February 2001.

In January 2010, Mayo revived Confessions on his BBC Radio 2 drive-time show. After Mayo left Radio 2 at the end of 2018, it returned again on his mid-morning show on Scala Radio from 4 March 2019, and also on his solo drivetime show on Greatest Hits Radio from 15 March 2021.

== Greatest Hits Radio (2021–present) ==
Mayo started the feature again on Greatest Hits Radio, with various members of the confessional change, but Matt Williams as a consistent member. A new confession is read every day from Monday to Thursday at 5:45pm. The listeners responses are read after the news at 6.

A version of the podcast was launched in 2023 - which was released every day as an 5-7 minute podcast on the GHR app. On 4 January 2024, it was announced that a new Confessions Podcast was to be launched, similar to the version on Radio 2 and available on all platforms.

== Members of the Confessional ==
Below are listed a complete selection of the members (past and present) of the confessional - the name of the group that decide if the confessor should be 'forgiven' or 'not forgiven'.

- Matt Williams (Regular)
- Suzi Purdie
- Holly Carnegie
- Nigel Barden (Thursdays only)
- Bobbie Pryor
- Sally Boazman
- Alan Dedicoat
- Jo Whiley
- Rebecca Pike
- Dianne Oxberry
- Rod McKenzie
- Peter Bowes
- Jackie Brambles
- Lynn Parsons
- Caron Keating
- Philippa Forrester
- Mark Goodier
- Bruno Brookes
- Phillip Schofield

== The Confessions Podcast ==
A major feature of the confessions, was the weekly podcast that was a round-up of that week's confessions that was published during Simon Mayo's Radio 2 stint. Often released on a Friday, it had recordings of the week's confessions played in full compiled together. In August 2017, it additionally featured some of the best listener responses, reading the messages and fan-mail that had been sent in by listeners and the 'black-listed' confessions that were unable to air but were allowed to have a brief summary on the podcast (Williams' favorite section). At the end, as an extra 5th confession, was the 'confession from the crypt' where a listener would write in to choose a confession from previous years that they wanted to be played again. These additions to the podcast added 15-20 minutes to the run time to make it last between 45 and 50 minutes.

The podcasts were published on the show's website for download as well as on other platforms such as ITunes, which was nicknamed "r-tunes" due to the BBC's policy of no advertising, and which is also a pun of OurTune, started by a previous Radio 1 mid morning host - Simon Bates.

These podcasts were made between 2010 and 2018, with changes made to the format in 2017 and 2018 (change in presenters). The episodes from July 2017 to the final episode in 2018 are still available to listen to on BBC Sounds and other platforms.

In January 2024, Greatest Hits Radio announced they would return to making the podcast in its full form similar to the Radio 2 version from 5 years previous.
