= Zoo Béres =

Hungarian radio host (born 1975)

Béres Zoo
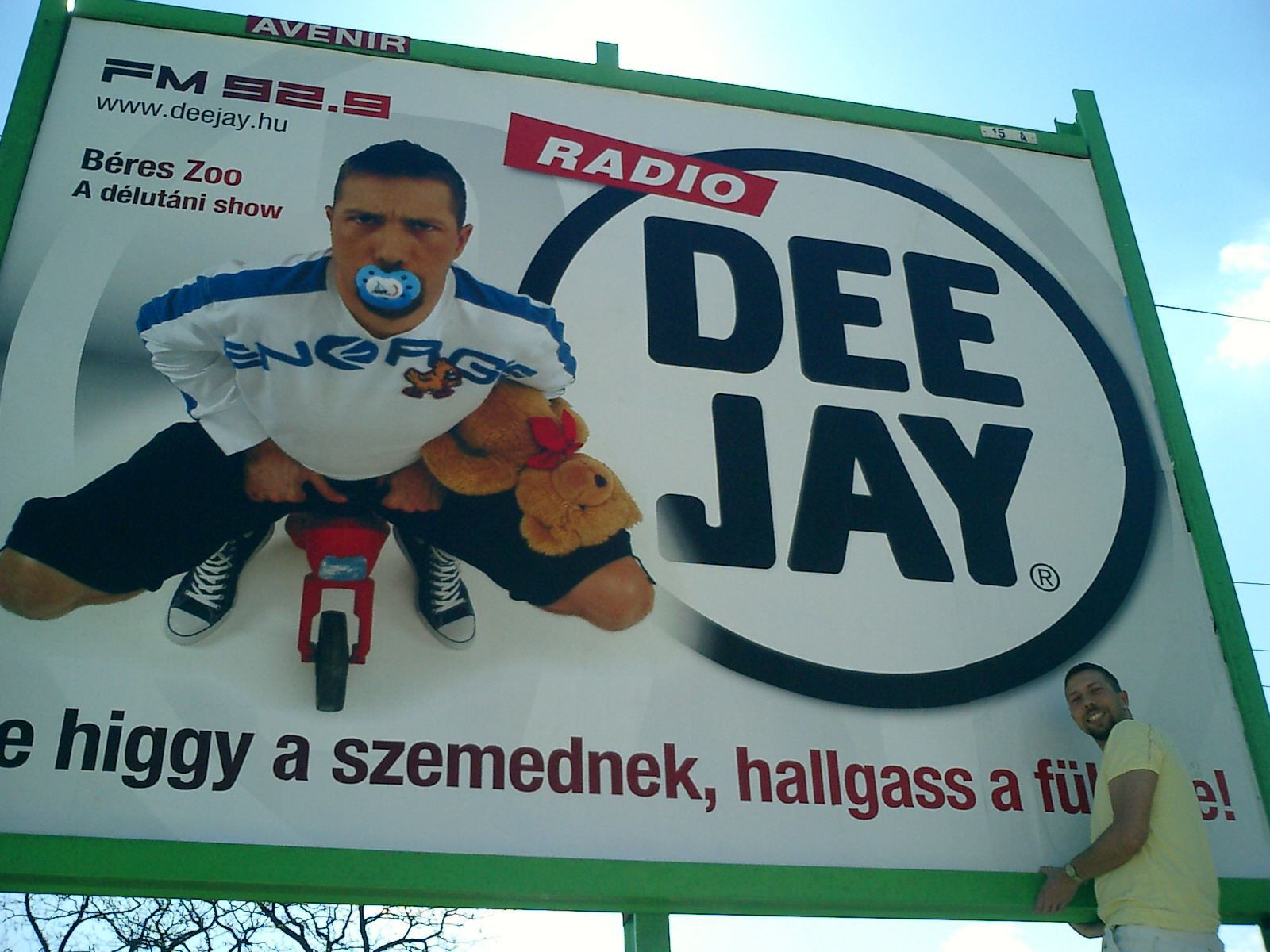
- Born: Zoltán Béres; 29 April 1975 (age 51); Budapest, Hungary
- Presenting career
- Show: Béres Zoo a Délutáni Show
- Style: Shock Jock
- Country: Australia
- Website: www.bereszoo.com

Zoltán Béres (born 29 April 1975) is a Hungarian radio host, composer, and DJ currently living in Australia.

Béres was a musician before re-inventing himself in radio. The abbreviation of his first name is pronounced "ZO" though it is a reference to the well-known Morning Zoo format. Béres was the first Hungarian shock jock to publicly mock other celebrities, pioneering a style that later became common in Hungary.

He moved to Australia in 2006.

== Music career ==
Béres Zoo became famous as composer, co-writer and performer with his 1996 project called 4F-Club. Their first single Balaton Fever was the year's greatest Hungarian hit, a success they later could not repeat. 4F-Club had 5 singles that received considerable airplay but the band split up in 1998. Béres released an unsuccessful solo album while at the same time working on an extensive list of other Hungarian musicians' albums, including Romantik, Happy Gang, Andrea Szulák, Groovehouse, UFO and BPM.

Under the alias "van dulek" he co-wrote Video Camera with DJ Surgeon in 2008, the track was played all around the globe on dance related radio stations. His last single Stop Dave was released mid-2009 through Musicadium.

== Radio career ==
After retiring from 4F-Club and music performances in general, Béres started out as a weekend DJ at Budapest start-up commercial station 96.4FM ROXY Radio (went out of service in 2010). He soon climbed up to weekday afternoons, calling his shift Béres Zoo the Afternoon Show (Hungarian: Béres Zoo a Délutáni Show) while using some aspects of the Morning Zoo radio format. The Afternoon Show featured animal characters who could easily touch even some of the most controversial subjects, after all a pig is just a pig. Using his composer and lyrics writer experience Béres Zoo wrote several comedy songs which played a key role in his programs.

Béres became ROXY's program director in 2003. Teaming up with his childhood friend and 4F-Club partner János Sallai (dubbed Nyalaka) he then hosted ROXY's morning show titled ROXY Riado until late 2004 when the station changed its format and they both moved on to host Radio DeeJay's afternoon show. The station was shut down by parent Italian Radio DeeJay on 3 May 2006.

From June to September 2006 Béres Zoo and sidekick Nyalaka were hosting Balaton Radio's morning show.

Béres moved to Australia late 2006 and started DJing at Melbourne's Kiss FM where he hosted two shows every week until October 2007.

== Threats and lawsuits ==
During his career Béres Zoo made fun of local and international celebrities which gained him several threats.

1. He had to change the lyrics 3 times on his comedy song Megvolt-megvolt to leave complaining celebrities out of it.
2. Television hostess Anettka filed a report to the Hungarian Media Authority (ORTT) about Béres Zoo's song Anettka you stinky skunk, the Authority later found that the song was rather cheeky than insulting and rejected Anettka's claims.
3. Pharmaceutical company Béres Gyógyszergyár Zrt filed a lawsuit against Béres Zoo in 2005 for using their registered trademark Béres in the title of his shows. The court ruled against the medical giant in 2007.

There were several other threats that Béres briefly mentioned on-air but being a public figure he felt vulnerable to revenge and therefore never disclosed the details.
