= Bob (band) =

English indie pop band (1986–1995)

BOB (always upper case)
- Origin: London, England
- Genres: Indie pop
- Years active: 1986–1995
- Labels: Sombrero, House of Teeth
- Past members: Richard Blackborow; Simon Armstrong; Jem Morris; Gary Connors; Dean Leggett; Stephen 'Henry' Hersom

BOB were an indie pop band from North London, England, formed in 1986.

== History ==
The initial line-up was Richard Blackborow (vocals, keyboards, guitar), Simon Armstrong (guitar, vocals). Jem Morris (bass guitar), joined the duo in 1986, and, augmented with a drum machine, they recorded the band's first release, a flexi disc, released in 1986 on their own House Of Teeth label, and containing three short songs: "Prune (Your Tree)", "Groove" and "Brian Wilson's Bed". The band gave a copy to John Peel in a fortuitous encounter in the Rough Trade record shop, and he played it many times. The drum machine was replaced by Gary Connors (drums) in 1987, and this line-up recorded 1987's What a Performance EP and the first of three John Peel sessions. Blackborow stated in 1988 that the band had a diverse set of songs in their repertoire at that stage and that the songs on the EP were selected from "by doing a quick poll of our friends".

Early in 1988, Gary Connors was replaced by former Jamie Wednesday drummer Dean Leggett, and the band recorded their second single, the Kirsty EP, a session for BBC Radio One's Simon Mayo, and their second John Peel session. Both singles received heavy play by John Peel. The two singles were compiled together with the earlier flexi disc as Swag Sack, which was their final recording for the Sombrero label. All later releases were on their own House Of Teeth label.

In 1989, the band released the Convenience EP (which reached no.31 in John Peel's Festive Fifty at the end of the year), followed by a limited edition/fan club release containing three songs: "Esmerelda Brooklyn", "I Don't Know" and "Sink". After their third and final John Peel session, Morris was replaced by ex-Caretaker Race bassist Stephen 'Henry' Hersom, and this final line-up recorded the Stride Up EP in 1990, an LP Leave The Straight Life Behind and the Tired EP in 1991, and one last single, the Nothing For Something EP in 1992. BOB became one of the victims of the demise of Rough Trade's distribution arm, which limited sales of the album and forced the band to tour for an extended period to recoup the album's costs. A feeling of disillusionment with the 'business' side of the music caused a drop in morale, and they disbanded early in 1995.

The BOB single "Convenience" was released for the first time on a digital format on the John Peel compilation box set Kats Karavan in October 2009.

In February 2014, "Leave the Straight Life Behind" was re-released by British independent label 3 Loop Music as a 2CD expanded edition which included the remastered album plus a bonus CD of all the John Peel and BBC sessions, as well as extra tracks.

In 2015, "The singles and EPs" was released by 3 Loop Music as a double CD compilation of remastered tracks from Swag Sack and all vinyl Sombrero and House of Teeth releases.

In 2019, the band announced six final concerts in England and Germany featuring Blackborow, Armstrong, Leggett and newly recruited old friend Arthur Tapp on bass. A limited edition 7" of "Convenience" was released on red, amber, and green vinyl with an unreleased B-side from 1992. The single reached number 18 on the official UK vinyl sales chart.

A double album of unreleased tracks entitled You Can Stop That For A Start, was released in September 2020 on Optic Nerve.

Bassist Stephen 'Henry' Hersom died in October 2023.

== Discography ==
=== Albums ===
- Swag Sack (1988, Sombrero, LP, Sombrero Five)
- Leave the Straight Life Behind (1991, House of Teeth, LP/CD, HOT13013)
- You Can Stop That for a Start (2020, Optic Nerve, double LP/CD, OPT4.030)

=== Singles ===
- "Prune (Your Tree)", "Groove!", & "Brian Wilson's Bed" (1986, House of Teeth, HOT 001) 7" flexi-disc
- What a Performance EP (1987, Sombrero, 12", Sombrero One)
- Kirsty EP (1988, Sombrero, 12", Sombrero Two) (UK Indie Chart #17)
- Esmerelda Brooklyn EP (1989, House of Teeth, HOT 003 w/ 'I Don't Know', 'Sink', & 'Esmerelda Brooklyn instrumental', Fan Club/Limited Edition EP, 12" Vinyl in 2 different sleeves, and 7" white-label, HOT 7003/12003)
- "Convenience" (1989, House of Teeth, 7"/12", HOT7002/HOT12002)
- Stride Up EP (1990, House of Teeth, 12", HOT12004)
- Tired EP (1990, House of Teeth, 12", HOT12005) also a 7" white-label promo
- Nothing for Something EP (1991, House of Teeth, 12", HOT12006)
