= The Caretaker Race =

English indie pop band

- Origin: London
- Genres: Indie pop
- Years active: 1986–1991
- Labels: Roustabout, Foundation
- Past members: Andy Strickland; Dave Mew; Henry Hersom; Sally Ward; Jackie Carrera; Andrew Deevey

The Caretaker Race were an English indie pop band formed in East London in 1986 when singer/guitarist Andy Strickland (also a part-time music journalist) left The Loft. Strickland recruited Dave Mew (drums), Henry Hersom (bass guitar), and Sally Ward (keyboards). The band's name came from a Star Trek paperback adventure. Gaining comparisons with The Go-Betweens, they initially released a brace of singles on their own Roustabout Records label before signing to the Foundation label in 1989. Hersom left to join Bob, his replacement being ex-Flatmates bassist Jackie Carrera, After two more singles on Foundation, the Stephen Street-produced album Hangover Square was released in 1990. Sally Ward left to take up teaching, to be replaced by Andrew Deevey. The band split up in 1991.

Strickland also filled in on guitar for The Chesterfields in 1987.

== Discography ==
=== Albums ===
- Hangover Square (1990, Foundation),

=== Singles ===
- "Somewhere on Sea" (1987, Roustabout)
- "Anywhere But Home" (1988, Roustabout)
- "I Wish I'd Said That" (1989, Foundation)
- "Man Overboard" (1990, Foundation)
- "Two Steel Rings" (1990, Foundation)
