= Scott Mills =

English radio DJ and television presenter (born 1973)

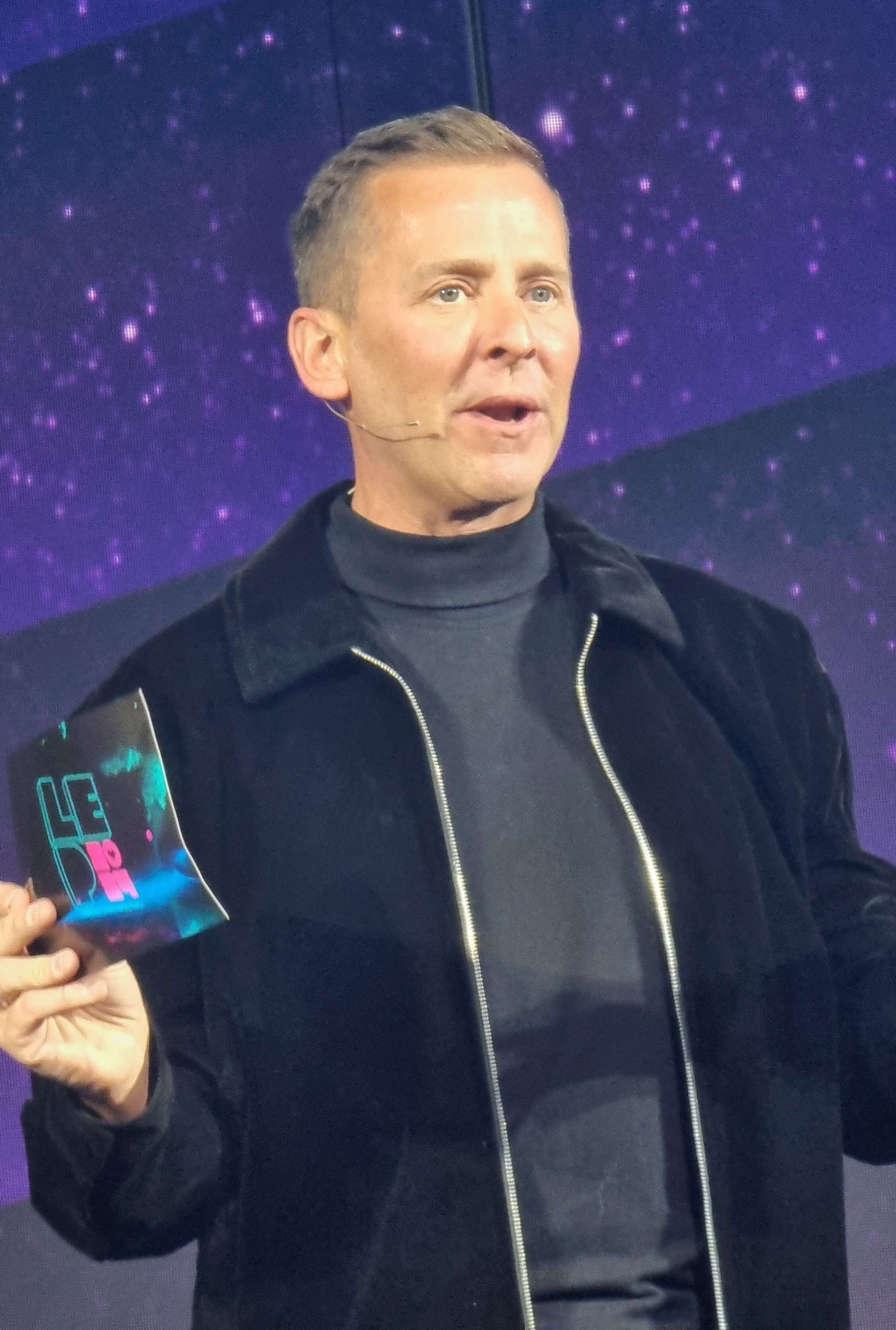
- Mills in 2024
- Born: Scott Robert Mills; 28 March 1973 (age 53); Southampton, Hampshire, England
- Occupations: Media personality; radio DJ
- Years active: 1989–2026
- Employer: BBC (1998–2026)
- Known for: Scott Mills
- Spouse: Sam Vaughan (m. 2024)

Scott Robert Mills (born 28 March 1973) is an English radio DJ, television presenter and occasional actor. He is best known for presenting the Scott Mills show on BBC Radio 1 from 2004 to 2022 and then, on BBC Radio 2, hosting the station's flagship breakfast show from January 2025 until his dismissal from the BBC in March 2026. He was also a UK commentator for the semi-finals of the Eurovision Song Contest between 2011 and 2025.

== Early life ==
Mills grew up in and around Southampton, attending Shakespeare Infant School and Crestwood College Secondary School in Eastleigh. Mills's parents separated; both have featured in his shows.

== Career ==
=== Radio ===
==== Early career ====
Mills began his career at the age of 16 as a DJ on his local Hampshire commercial radio station, Power FM, after barraging the station with demo tapes. Mills was given an opportunity to present a week's worth of shows, and based on the success of this, he was immediately offered the 'graveyard slot' of 1:00 am – 6:00 am (six nights a week), making him the youngest permanent presenter on mainstream commercial radio. Mills later moved to the late afternoon 'drive time' slot.

Mills moved from Power FM to GWR FM Bristol, staying with the station for two years, before joining Piccadilly Key 103 in Manchester, starting on the late-night slot before moving to the mid-morning show. In 1995, Mills began to work for the new London station Heart 106.2.

Mills has provided various voice-overs, including the voice of the specialist of the in-store radio station Homebase FM, the voice-over for Blockbuster Inc.'s in-store infomercial channel Blockbuster TV, and the voice-over for The VH1 Album Chart on the UK television channel VH1.

==== BBC Radio 1 ====
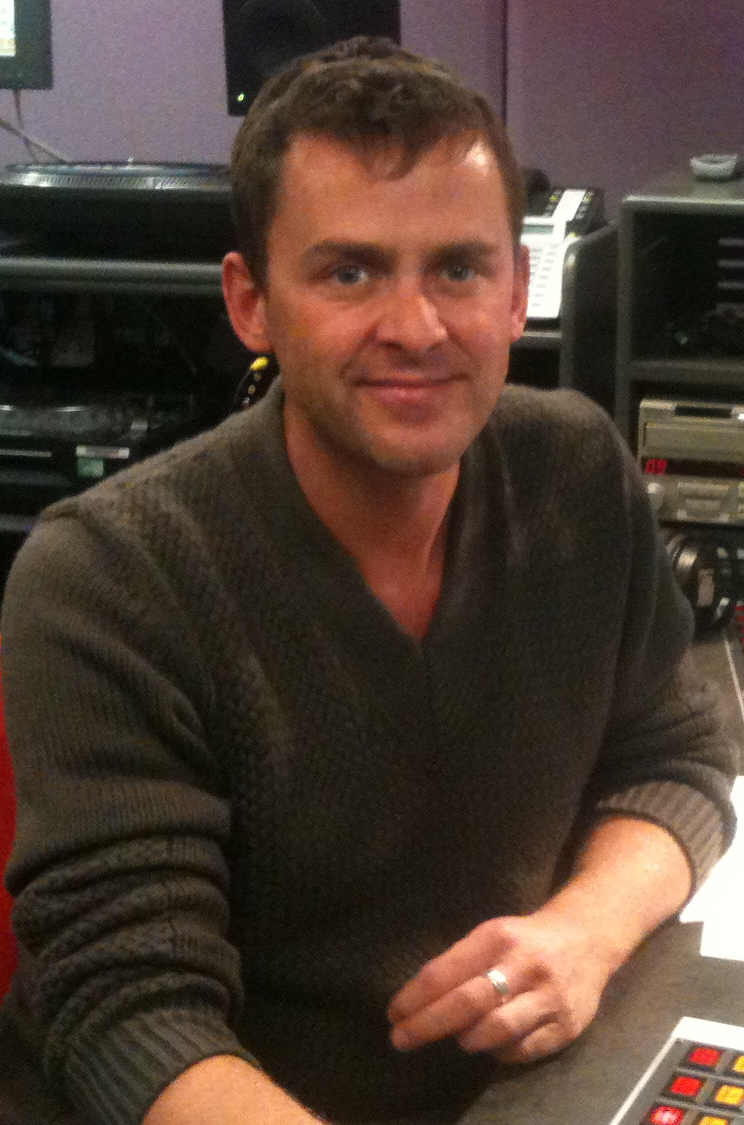
Mills in the BBC Radio 1 studio in 2011

Mills joined BBC Radio 1 in October 1998 to present the early breakfast show which was broadcast between 4 am and 7 am. In January 2004 Mills moved to a weekend afternoon slot, which was followed by a further move later that year to the weekday early-evening slot which was vacant due to Sara Cox's maternity leave. Cox did not return and Mills became a permanent presenter of the early evening programme which was renamed The Scott Mills Show. The programme moved to an afternoon slot in April 2012 when Mills swapped presenting duties with Greg James.

Whilst at Radio 1, Mills also provided holiday cover for other presenters as well as hosting The Official Chart between June 2018 and August 2022.

On 1 July 2022 it was announced that Mills would be leaving Radio 1 after 24 years to replace Steve Wright in Steve Wright in the Afternoon on BBC Radio 2. Scott Mills replaced Wright in the weekday afternoon slot on 31 October 2022.

From 2011 to 2022 a long running segment on the programme was Innuendo Bingo, where guests would listen to clips of people unintentionally saying things that had innuendo whilst at the same time holding water in their mouths, with the object of the game being to stop themselves from spitting the water out of their mouth as they are laughing. The guests would be sat opposite Chris Stark who would also have water in his mouth and the game would often result in both the guest and Stark ending up completely soaked.

==== BBC Radio 2 ====
While being a regular daytime show host on BBC Radio 1, Mills hosted shows on Radio 2 as a cover presenter.

On 20 March 2017, he hosted a late-night show from 10 pm to 2 am for Sara Cox' Dance-a-Thon.

On 28 May 2018, he presented a Bank Holiday Monday show, Radio 2 Remix, from 4 pm until 7 pm. Immediately preceding the Radio 2 show, Mills presented from 1 pm on Radio 1, being one of the first people ending a show on Radio 1 and starting one on Radio 2 at the same day.

In April 2019, Mills was a stand in for Rylan Clark on Radio 2's Saturday afternoon show from 3 pm to 6 pm.

From 2021 to 2022, Mills was the regular stand-in for Ken Bruce.

On 1 July 2022, it was announced that Mills was to join Radio 2 permanently to replace Steve Wright in the Afternoon at the end of September 2022. Mills's new show, running from 2–4 pm, debuted on 31 October.

On 19 November 2024, it was announced that Mills would replace Zoe Ball as the presenter of Radio 2's breakfast show. He presented the Scott Mills Breakfast Show from January 2025 until his dismissal from the BBC in March 2026.

==== BBC Radio 5 Live ====
Mills and his Radio 1 co-presenter Chris Stark also hosted a show on BBC Radio 5 Live, as part of the station's weekend line up starting on 9 November 2019. The show was broadcast between 9am and 11am. The final show was on 20 August 2022.

=== Scott Mills: The Musical ===
A musical based on Mills's life was performed at the Edinburgh Festival Fringe 2009, running for three nights from 11 to 13 August, at the Pleasance One Theatre. The musical was born from an internet rumour that Mills would perform in Rick Rolling the Musical as Rick Astley and other 1980s musicians. He denied this rumour on his radio show, and listeners' suggested the creation of a musical based on his life. Some of the songs were composed and sent in his listeners. The musical was previously available for viewing on the BBC Radio 1 website, but has now been removed by the BBC.

Mills was challenged to do a one-man show at Edinburgh Fringe in 2010 by his co-hosts and production team. The Bjorn Identity was a parody of The Bourne Identity, telling the story of Jason Bjorn with the music of ABBA.

=== Television work ===
In addition to his radio work, he has also appeared on various television shows, playing both as a character and as himself. His main acting role was as reporter Paul Lang in the BBC medical drama Casualty, appearing in episodes in both 2006 and 2007. He also had a cameo in the BBC Scotland soap opera River City after praising the show highly on his radio show. He also appeared as a police officer in the Channel 4 soap opera Hollyoaks in 2008.

Mills has appeared as a contestant or guest on programmes including Mastermind, Supermarket Sweep, Children in Need, Most Haunted and Never Mind the Buzzcocks, and has appeared in the show Identity, hosted by Donny Osmond.

He narrated the music TV show The Pop Years which, coincidentally, was also narrated by fellow BBC Radio 1 DJ Edith Bowman. He has presented high-profile programmes including the Wednesday night National Lottery draw on BBC One and his own pilot (featured on the radio show) of Reverse-a-Word. He has narrated Dating in the Dark on Living. In February 2008, he presented Upstaged on the newly re-launched BBC Three. He also hosted a BBC Three television show called Radio 1 on Three, inspired by his radio show.

In February 2011, Mills presented a BBC Three documentary about Uganda called The World's Worst Place to Be Gay?.

Mills appeared on series 12 of Strictly Come Dancing and his dance partner was Joanne Clifton, sister of Kevin, who also dances on the show. They came 11th in the competition after being eliminated in week 6.

Mills won, alongside Stark, the first episode of the two-episode Robot Wars: Battle of the Stars (2016) with their robot Arena Cleaner, which was a collaboration with Dave Moulds, who drove Carbide, second place in the preceding series. This was broadcast over the Christmas and New Year period 2016.

Mills and his husband Sam won the second series of Celebrity Race Across the World travelling across South America.

=== Dismissal from the BBC ===
On 30 March 2026, Mills' dismissal from all BBC roles was announced, after allegations were made about his "personal conduct" relating to a "historic relationship". It was subsequently revealed that Mills had been questioned by the Metropolitan Police in 2018, over allegations of "serious sexual offences" against a teenage boy under the age of 16. These offences were alleged to have taken place between 1997 and 2000, when Mills was in his mid-20s. A file of evidence was passed on to the Crown Prosecution Service, who determined the case had insufficient evidence to continue. The investigation into Mills, which began in December 2016, was closed in May 2019. Mills was reportedly dismissed after the BBC were informed of the age of his alleged victim, although the corporation had been aware of the investigation itself since 2017.

=== Charity work ===
In 2011, Mills took part in the BT Charity Trek along with other celebrities, as part of that year's Comic Relief Red Nose Day campaign. Participants spent five days in the Kaisut desert in north Kenya, covering 108 kilometres (67 miles) in temperatures up to 40 °C (104 °F). The trek raised £1.375mn for Comic Relief. On 16 and 17 November 2022, Mills raised over £1 million for Children in Need after riding on a treadmill for twenty four-hours.

Mills supported the former climate change prevention charitable campaign Global Cool.

From 2021 to 2026, when he was dropped following his departure from the BBC, Mills was a patron of the Neuroblastoma Society.

=== Recognition ===
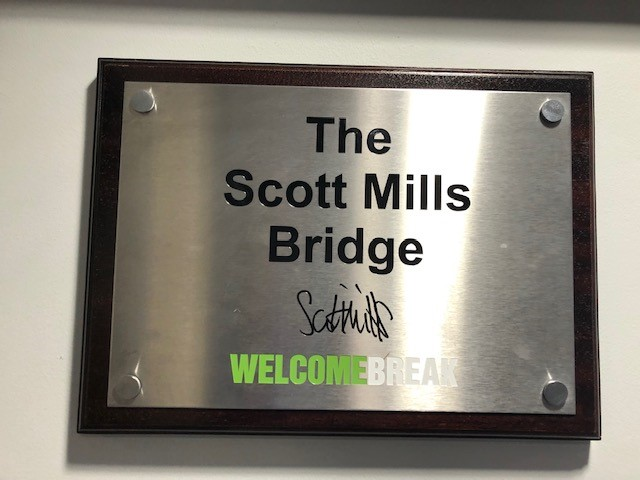
Plaque naming the Scott Mills Bridge

Mills was awarded an honorary Doctorate of Arts from Southampton Solent University on 2 November 2009. On 16 March 2016, the bridge crossing the M3 at Fleet services was officially named the Scott Mills Bridge and a plaque unveiled. The plaque was removed in April 2026 following Mills's dismissal from the BBC.

== Personal life ==
Mills lives in London. Mills came out as gay to the press in 2001 to avoid tabloid-style speculation. In his Guardian interview he said, "I'd just like to be accepted as a normal bloke who is gay and is on the radio and the television." Mills was ranked as the 12th most influential gay person in Britain on the Independent on Sunday's Pink List for 2010. In October 2021, Mills announced his engagement to Sam Vaughan, his boyfriend of four years. They married in Vilanova i la Geltrú, Spain, in June 2024.

== Awards ==
Year	Ceremony	Award	Result
2017	ARIAs	Best Entertainment/Comedy Production (BBC Radio 1 24 Hour "LOLathon" for Red Nose Day)	Bronze
2011	Stonewall Awards	Broadcast of the Year (The World's Worst Place to Be Gay?)	Won
2011	Sony Radio Academy Awards	Music Radio Personality of the Year	Nominated
2010	Sony Radio Academy Awards	Music Radio Personality of the Year	Gold
2007	Sony Radio Academy Awards	The Interactive Programme	Bronze
2005	Loaded Laftas	Funniest DJ	Won

Media offices
Preceded by Greg James	BBC Radio 1 Chart show presenter 15 June 2018 – 19 August 2022	Succeeded by Jack Saunders
