= The Chesterfields =

English indie pop band

- Origin: Yeovil, Somerset
- Genres: Independent rock, indie pop
- Years active: 1984–1989; 2014–present
- Members: Simon Barber; Andy Strickland; Helen Stickland; Rob Parry
- Past members: Dave Goldsworthy; Richard Chant; Mark Barber; Dominic Manns; Brendan Holden; Rodney Allen

The Chesterfields are an English indie pop band from Yeovil, Somerset, England. Hardcore fans tended to refer to them as "The Chesterf!elds", with an exclamation mark replacing the "i", following the example of the band's logo.

The band was formed in summer 1984 by Dave Goldsworthy (vocals, guitar), Simon Barber (bass, vocals), and Dominic Manns (drums), joined in 1985 by Brendan Holden (guitar). Early recordings included contributions to the Golden Pathway tapes, that captured the West Country music scene of the time, such as "Stephanie Adores" and "The Boy Who Sold His Suitcase", the latter with a female lead singer, Sarah.

The first vinyl release was as one half of a flexi disc; "Nose out of Joint" shared a single side with The Shop Assistants' "Home Again", and was given away free with copies of London's Legend fanzine and future Subway Organisation boss, Martin Whitehead's own Bristol fanzine.

They signed to The Subway Organization, releasing three well-received singles, before Holden was replaced by Rodney Allen. The debut LP Kettle was released in July 1987, with a compilation of the early singles, Westward Ho! issued later the same year. Allen left to join The Blue Aeroplanes, to be replaced temporarily by Andy Strickland of The Loft/The Caretaker Race, before a more permanent replacement was found in the form of Simon Barber's brother Mark.

The band then moved to their own Household label, issuing two more singles and a third album, Crocodile Tears. Manns left and was replaced by future PJ Harvey drummer Rob Ellis but when Goldsworthy departed in late 1988 the band effectively split. The Barber brothers continued as The Chesterfields for a final single, "Fool Is The Man" in 1989.

The band split - seemingly for good - in mid 1989, Simon Barber forming Basinger, and Mark Barber formed Grape. Goldsworthy fronted several more bands, including Fürnt, Diceman and Mujer21. The Chesterfields reformed briefly in the 1990s to tour Japan after their material was re-issued there and a new album, Flood, the band's only album of the 90s, was released. Dave Goldsworthy (Davy Chesterfield) was killed by a hit and run driver in Oxford, England, on 9 November 2003.

The band's continuing fanbase saw much of their back-catalogue re-issued by Vinyl Japan in the 1990s.

In June 2014, to celebrate the NME C86 tape, Design (fronted by Barber) along with Andy Strickland of The Loft/The Caretaker Race played a set of songs by The Chesterfields at the 92 Club in London. Following the success of The Chesterfields set at the NME C86 gig, Design continued to play classic Chesterfields songs such as "Johnny Dee", "Lunchtime for the Wild Youth" and "Last Train to Yeovil" throughout 2014 and 2015.

The Chesterfields were announced as playing the NYC Popfest in New York, from 19–22 May 2016, to coincide with a new EP release. In 2019, The Chesterfields with their new line up of Simon Barber, Andy Strickland, Helen Stickland and Rob Parry, played a UK tour including The 100 Club in London. In mid 2021 the band recorded a new album co-produced with Ben Turner and John Parish. The album was released by Mr Mellow's Music on 23 September 2022 and preceded by two singles - "Our Songbird Has Gone" and "Mr Wilson Goes To Norway". The band set out on a short UK tour in October 2022.

== Discography ==
Chart placings shown are from the UK Indie Chart.

=== Albums ===
- Kettle (1987, Subway, SUBORG 003) No. 5
- Westward Ho! (1987, Subway, SUBORG 005) No. 25
- Crocodile Tears (1988, Household, HOLD4LP/CD) No. 10
- Flood (1995, Vinyl Japan, ASKCD041)
- New Modern Homes (Sep 2022, Mr Mellow's Music)

=== Singles ===
- "Nose Out of Joint" – flexi disc (1985, Golden Pathway)
- A Guitar in Your Bath EP (1986, Subway, SUBWAY 3) No. 19
- "Completely and Utterly" (1986, Subway, SUBWAY 7) No. 16
- "Ask Johnny Dee" (1987, Subway, SUBWAY 11) No. 4
- Janice Long Session EP (1987, Night Tracks, SFNT003) No. 29
- "Goodbye Goodbye" (2006, Household, HOLD1T) No. 10
- "Blame" (1988, Household, HOLD3/HOLD3T) No. 11
- "Fool Is a Man" (1989, Household, HOLD5T)
- "Down by the Wishing Pool" (1994, Vinyl Japan, TASK026/TASKCD026)
- Johnny Dee EP (1995, Vinyl Japan, TASKCD035)
- Our Songbird Has Gone (July 2022, Mr Mellow's Music)
- Mr Wilson Goes To Norway (August 2022 Spinout Nuggets)
