= Enjoy Yourself (It's Later than You Think) =

1949 song by Carl Sigman and Herb Magidson

Song
- Published: 1949
- Composer: Carl Sigman
- Lyricist: Herb Magidson

"Enjoy Yourself (It's Later Than You Think)" is a popular song, first published in 1949. It's an adaptation of a French song written by Sacha Guitry called "Amusez-vous" (1934), with music written by W. Heymans. It was adapted by written by Carl Sigman and lyrics by Herb Magidson, with a similar musical and lyrical theme.

== Cover versions ==
A popular version of the song, recorded by Guy Lombardo and His Royal Canadians, was made on 27 November (some sources give 28 November), 1949. The recording was released by Decca Records as catalog number 24825. The record first reached the Billboard record chart in the US on 13 January 1950, and lasted 19 weeks on the chart, peaking at number 10.

- Doris Day (1950)
- Bing Crosby
- Tommy Dorsey
- Jolie Holland
- Jools Holland & His Rhythm & Blues Orchestra (2003)
- The New Orleans Knights
- Louis Prima
- Prince Buster
- The Specials (1980)
- The Supremes
- Todd Snider

== In popular culture ==
- The 2003 recording by Jools Holland and Prince Buster was used by Simon Mayo as the opening theme to his Drivetime show on BBC Radio 2, and still continues to be used since his return to drivetime on Greatest Hits Radio. The show also occasionally used the Guy Lombardo recording as an opening theme to the second hour.
- On October 31, 2015, the Trey Anastasio Band performed the song at Brooklyn Bowl Las Vegas.
- For 27 years, a cover version of this song's chorus with Cantonese lyrics, written by Eunice Lam, was used as the theme song for Enjoy Yourself Tonight, a Hong Kong TVB variety show that was one of the longest running live shows in television history worldwide.
- The Louis Prima version of the song was used in the series finale of the show House. Amber Volakis (Anne Dudek) also sings a version of this song in the season 5 episode titled "Under My Skin."
- It was featured on the soundtrack for Woody Allen's 1996 movie Everyone Says I Love You.
- The Doris Day version of the song released in 1950, was used in a “Honda Accord” commercial and the ninth episode of the third season of The Man in the High Castle.
- It was the closing song for Jools Holland’s Jools' Annual Hootenanny from 2010 to 2019, and again from 2022 to 2026.
- It was mentioned in the 2022 movie The Adam Project.
- Jeff the robot plays The Specials cover version on a CD while driving the RV in Finch (film).
- The Specials‘ version of the song was used as the theme tune for the BBC Radio 4 comedy panel show I've Never Seen Star Wars (radio series).
- The Specials' version of the song was played over the end credits in the last episode of season 4 of Ted Lasso
