= The Pop Years =

2003 British television series

- Genre: Documentary
- Directed by: Sonia Paladini
- Narrated by: Edith Bowman; Scott Mills
- Composer: Steve Cripps
- Country of origin: United Kingdom
- Original language: English
- No. of series: 1
- No. of episodes: 20

Production
- Producers: Ric Blaxill; Sonia Paladini
- Production company: London Weekend Television

Original release
- Network: Sky1
- Release: 1 April – 12 August 2003

The Pop Years is a British television show that reviewed pop music of a certain year from 1980 to 1999. It was first shown on Sky1 in 2003 and was later repeated on Sky3. The programme featured archive clips relating to the particular year that it was reviewing, e.g. music videos or live performances. It also featured interviews with famous singers from that year and talking heads who enjoyed that year's music. The show ran for a single series of 20 episodes and was narrated by Scott Mills and Edith Bowman.

The producer was Ric Blaxill, who had previously produced Top of the Pops and CD:UK.

== Pundits ==
The Pop Years contained interviews with many celebrities, who acted as pundits or talking heads for the show, and discussed various aspects of the year that was being featured. Some of these included:

- Alan Carr
- Ali Bastian
- Andrew Collins
- Anthony Wilson
- Betty Boo
- Brandon Block
- Claire Sweeney
- Clint Boon
- Colin Murray
- Darius Campbell
- Don Letts
- Holly Valance
- James Redmond
- Jazzie B
- Julia Carling
- Kate Lawler
- Kerry Katona
- Limahl
- Louis Walsh
- Mark Goodier
- MC Hammer
- Pete Burns
- Pete Tong
- Pete Waterman
- Peter Powell
- Sally Lindsay
- Shaun Ryder
- Simon Cowell
- Toby Anstis
- Tony Hadley

== See also ==
- List of programmes broadcast by Sky1
