= Matt Williams (radio presenter) =

British sports presenter and reporter (born 1971)

- Born: Matthew Williams; 1971 (age 54–55); Southport, Lancashire, England
- Education: University of Bradford
- Occupations: radio presenter, reporter
- Years active: c.1991–present (on radio)

Matt Williams (born 1971) is a British sports presenter and reporter on BBC Radio 2 and later, on Greatest Hits Radio.

== Background ==
Born in Southport, Lancashire, Williams grew up in Formby near Liverpool and was educated at Holy Family High School in Thornton before studying French and Spanish at Bradford University.

He started at BBC Radio Cumbria working as a reporter and in 1991 joined BBC Radio 1 on the Newsbeat programme. Starting with 5 Live sport in 2001 he has worked on the 5 Live Breakfast programme from 2003 to 2008, before moving to 5 Live's Drive programme. He then moved to Radio 2 to become the sports presenter on the Simon Mayo Drivetime programme, and was a member of the team which won the Sony Radio Academy Awards for Best Music Programme in 2011.

In addition to sports presenting, Williams participated in Mayo's Confessions feature. He also styled himself as Dr. Mosh on the Radio 2 show, promoting loud rock, hardcore punk and metal music, with songs from artists such as Led Zeppelin, Lawnmower Deth, Black Sabbath, Guns N' Roses and Uriah Heep.

After leaving Radio 2 in December 2018, he became the head of communications at the British Equestrian Federation.

He was reunited with Simon Mayo in February 2021 on the DJ's new drivetime show for Greatest Hits Radio.
