= Simon Mayo =

English radio presenter and author

Simon Mayo MBE
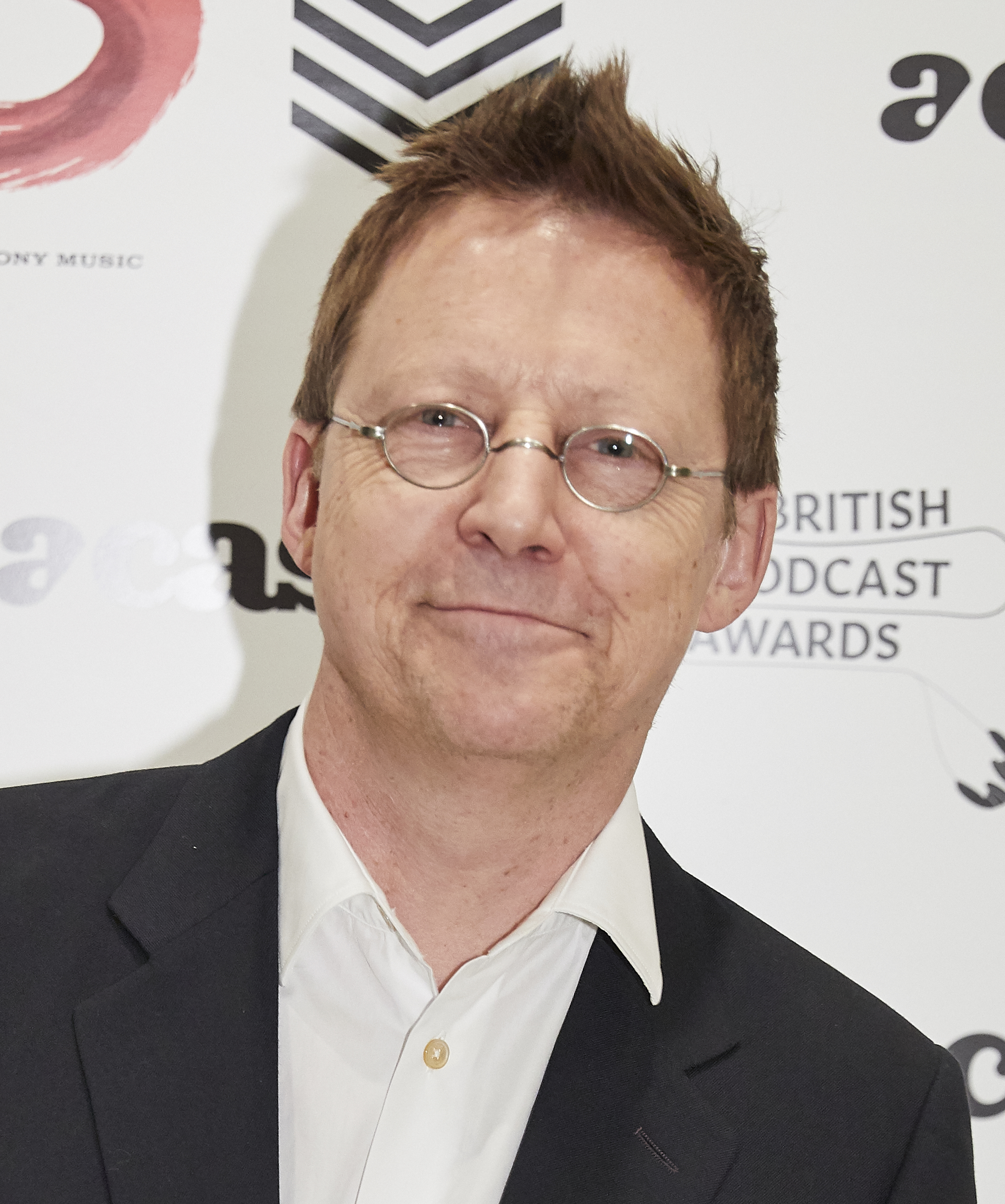
- Mayo in May 2018
- Born: Simon Andrew Hicks Mayo; 21 September 1958 (age 68); London, England
- Education: University of Warwick
- Years active: 1986–present
- Spouse: Hilary Bird (m. 1986)
- Children: 3
- Presenting career
- Show: The Album Show; Drivetime
- Station: Greatest Hits Radio
- Time slot: Monday – Friday, 4 pm – 7 pm; Sunday, 1 pm – 4 pm
- Country: United Kingdom

Simon Andrew Hicks Mayo (born 21 September 1958) is an English radio presenter and author who worked for BBC Radio from 1982 until 2022. Mayo has presented across three BBC stations for extended periods. From 1986 to 2001 he worked for Radio 1, including five years on the Radio 1 Breakfast Show. From 2001 he presented on BBC Radio 5 Live: from his debut until 2009 on a daily afternoon programme, and from 2009 until 2022 with Kermode and Mayo's Film Review on Fridays. Between January 2010 and December 2018 he was the presenter of Simon Mayo Drivetime on BBC Radio 2, for the final six months with co-host Jo Whiley. In addition to his programme on 5 Live, Mayo originally joined Radio 2 between October 2001 and April 2008 to host a weekly Album Chart Show, followed by the station's Music Club Weekly. Since March 2021, Simon Mayo Drivetime has returned on Greatest Hits Radio.

In 2008, Mayo was named as the "Radio Broadcaster of the Year" at the 34th annual Broadcasting Press Guild Awards, and the "Speech Broadcaster of the Year" at the Sony Radio Academy Awards, receiving the latter for his "ability to paint colourful pictures of location and event and his ability to bring the very best out of his guests, encouraging conversation and interaction between them while skilfully nudging and controlling them" and for being "a master of light and shade, handling serious and lighter issues with aplomb."

Mayo is a published author. His works include a book titled Confessions, based on the Confessions slot from his radio shows, and several fictional thrillers.

== Early life ==
Simon Mayo was born in September 1958. His father was a headteacher, and his mother, who had worked as a BBC studio manager in the 1950s, also taught for a time. His father was the headmaster of the Junior School section of Royal Russell School, Croydon, in the late 1960s, which the actor Martin Clunes attended at that time. In the early 1970s, his father was the headmaster of the Herbert Shiner School in Petworth, West Sussex, a middle school or intermediate school.

He attended St John's Primary School in Croydon, the Arden School in Knowle in the West Midlands (for one term), the independent Solihull School and Worthing High School for Boys in West Sussex, which was then a state grammar school for boys. He graduated from the University of Warwick in 1981, with a degree in history and politics.

== Early career ==
His mother had undertaken part-time work in radio, and having occasionally experienced it with her, Mayo had wanted to work as a studio manager. But as a result of a frequency deficiency in his left ear, he failed the required hearing test, and refocused his career on presenting. Mayo spent some time at Southlands Hospital Radio. He had fully planned to start a PGCE course, but instead was offered work, for five years as a presenter with BBC Radio Nottingham from 10:45 am to 2 pm. With a Radio Nottingham colleague he developed a programme format called Globe Phone and sent it to Johnny Beerling, head of Radio 1, who offered him a job.

He joined BBC Radio 1 in 1986, presenting a two-hour Saturday evening show from 7:30 pm to 9:30 pm. In October 1987, he progressed to the weekend early slots from 6 am to 8 am, and then became presenter of the weekday evening show in January 1988, which went out from 7:30 pm to 10 pm. Five months later he was offered the BBC Radio 1 breakfast show, regarded as the most prestigious presentation job in UK radio.

== Shows ==
=== BBC Radio 1 ===
==== Breakfast ====
Mayo spent five years presenting Radio 1 Breakfast on BBC Radio 1. Throughout his tenure on the breakfast show, which was based on a "zoo" format, Mayo was joined by news anchor Rod McKenzie and by a sidekick weather and travel presenter: first Carol Dooley, then Sybil Ruscoe, Jackie Brambles, and finally Dianne Oxberry. The show's producer was Ric Blaxill, who also made regular speaking contributions.

He started his first breakfast show by playing "Somewhere in My Heart" by Aztec Camera, which was preceded by a montage of previous breakfast show hosts and then Mayo himself saying "It's me, Simon Mayo, good morning."

The programme became known for various features, including On This Day in History, sound-tracked by a looped version of George Michael's "I Want Your Sex"; the long-running cryptic game The Identik-Hit Quiz, where Mayo and his co-hosts would act out a short scene which cryptically led listeners to the title of a hit song; and his Confessions feature where members of the public sought absolution for their (often frivolous or humorous) "sins". Both On This Day in History and Confessions spawned spin-off books.

Due to frequent plays from Mayo, several unlikely hit singles reached the British charts, including "Kinky Boots" by Patrick Macnee and Honor Blackman; "Donald Where's Your Troosers?" by Andy Stewart; and "Always Look on the Bright Side of Life", sung and written by Eric Idle. For helping Monty Python have a hit with the latter, thirteen years after it first appeared on the soundtrack to The Life of Brian, Idle presented Mayo with a model bare foot, in the style of the animated version which used to end the opening titles to the television show.

Like all Radio 1's high profile presenters of the time, Mayo would take his turn to spend a week in a coastal area of the United Kingdom during the Radio 1 Roadshows which ran for two months of the summer. For a short while, he also presented an additional weekend show for the station on a Sunday afternoon, provisionally titled O Solomon Mayo, to cover for the absent Phillip Schofield, who was working in the West End.

==== Mid-mornings ====
Mayo formally gave up the breakfast show in 1993, though he had been on an extended period of paternity leave when the announcement was made. His stand-in Mark Goodier was his replacement.

Mayo took over the station's mid-morning slot on 25 October 1993, where he remained until February 2001. In addition to this, in May 1994, he presented Simon Mayo's Classic Years, where he played two hours of classic pop tunes. The show originally went out on a Sunday lunchtime from noon till 2pm, but in November 1994 went out from 10 am till noon on Sundays. This lasted until October 1995.

In January 1997, Mayo made a brief return to the breakfast show for three weeks after Chris Evans was dismissed, but both Mayo and Radio 1 ruled out the possibilities of a permanent return to the programme. On his first morning as breakfast stand-in, Mayo read out an email from a man who had emigrated to New Zealand four years earlier, and had arrived back in the United Kingdom that morning, and was "delighted to hear you're still doing the breakfast show".

In March 1999, Mayo broke a world record by broadcasting for 37 hours in aid of that year's Comic Relief.

Mayo remained on the mid-morning slot until he left Radio 1 in 2001, seeing breakfast show presenters Mark Goodier, Steve Wright, Chris Evans, Mark and Lard, Kevin Greening, Zoe Ball, and Sara Cox, come and go from the slot. He was replaced by Jo Whiley.

His final show was on Friday 16 February 2001, and before signing off, he said: "One of the reasons I'm not going to 'do a DLT' is that I've nothing to complain about at all – though as I'll still be employed by the BBC it'd be a stupid thing to do. I always thought as a kid working at Radio 1 would be the most fun and the best place for any presenter to work and I still think that's true." His final track played on Radio 1 was "Ace of Spades" by Motörhead.

=== BBC Radio 5 Live ===
I always thought I'd like to go back to music. But I also loved exploring a subject from scratch to interview a nuclear physicist. The [5 Live] job was a bit like an Open University degree course. The longer I did it, the more I realised how little I know, which is part of ageing.

— Mayo, after his move to Radio 2 Drivetime

In May 2001, after 15 years of broadcasting with Radio 1, Mayo moved on to another national BBC station, BBC Radio 5 Live, to present an afternoon programme. He began broadcasting every weekday from 1 pm to 4 pm, where he remained until 18 December 2009. He was on air in 2001 when the 9/11 attacks took place in the United States, broadcasting live as the events unfolded.

The programme generally combined topical debates, interviews and reviews. It came live from Westminster each Wednesday for live coverage of Prime Minister's Questions, with discussion and debate afterwards with political correspondents and MPs. The programme also featured Mayo's former Radio 1 sidekick Mark Kermode reviewing the new movie releases each Friday afternoon.

In a May 2008 interview with The Guardian, Mayo mentioned he "signed a contract for the next two years" and was uncertain whether he would still be at 5 Live when it moved to Salford. It was later confirmed that Mayo was to move to BBC Radio 2's drivetime slot, though he continued to host a weekly two-hour film review show, Kermode and Mayo's Film Review, on 5 Live with Kermode until April 2022. In May 2009, Mayo and Kermode won a Gold Sony Radio Award in the Speech Award category.

=== BBC Radio 2 ===
In addition to his daily programme on 5 Live, from October 2001 to April 2007, Mayo hosted the Album Chart show each week for BBC Radio 2. Alongside this, on 2 January 2006, he presented The Ultimate Music Year for the station, where listeners got the chance to vote for their favourite year for music. He has also presented many Sold on Song projects, presented the Top 100 Albums and provided holiday cover for Johnnie Walker on Sundays. From April 2007 to April 2008 Mayo took over the Radio 2 Music Club every Monday night from 11:30 pm to 12:30 am.

In January 2010, Mayo took over from Chris Evans on the Drivetime show, noting he was "very lucky to be given a second chance in such a high-profile slot." The programme included a number of regular daily features including "Nigel's Recipes", "Confessions", "Homework Sucks" and "The Showstopper". Every Friday he hosted "All-Request Friday" where listeners rang the show and had their favourite song played on the radio after a short interview. The show ended on 4 May 2018 after eight years, as Mayo was to begin hosting a revamped drivetime show with co-host Jo Whiley from 14 May 2018. On 22 October that year, the station announced that Mayo would be leaving Radio 2 altogether after a backlash against the change, with Whiley moving back to an evening slot. Their last show together aired on 20 December, with Mayo presenting his last show after 17 years with the station the following day.

As his opening theme Mayo used the 2003 recording by Jools Holland and Prince Buster of the 1948 song "Enjoy Yourself" by Carl Sigman and by Herb Magidson. Later editions of the show also used the popular 1950 hit version by Guy Lombardo and his Royal Canadians. Incidental music included "Light My Fire" by Edmundo Ros.

In May 2011, Mayo won a Sony Award for "Best Music Show" for his work and that of his team on the Radio 2 drive time slot.

On 21 December 2018, Mayo presented his last show on BBC Radio 2, it being an All-Request Friday, which featured his jingles previously used on his drivetime show. The last song to be played was "Bring Me Sunshine" by Morecambe and Wise.

=== Scala Radio, later Magic Classical ===
On 4 March 2019 at 10am, Mayo presented the launch of a new classical music digital radio station, Scala Radio, for which he was one of the lead presenters. He presented a daily mid-morning show for two years, until starting work for Greatest Hits Radio; he continued to present his Essential Albums show for Scala on Saturdays until May 2023. He then presented a two-hour show on Sunday mornings, which continues after Scala was rebranded as Magic Classical in September 2024. Simon presented his last Sunday show on 12 April 2026.

=== Greatest Hits Radio ===
In addition to his daily programme on Scala, Mayo joined Greatest Hits Radio in September 2020, firstly taking over a weekly album show on Sundays from 1pm to 4pm. He then began the Monday to Friday drivetime radio show on 15 March 2021, bringing back items from his BBC Radio 2 shows including "Confessions", "Tunesday", "Nigel's Recipes" and "All-Request Friday". Mayo is joined on these shows by sports reporter Matt Williams, who had worked with him for some time on the Radio 2 show. He continues to present his Album Show on Sunday afternoons.

== Other work ==
=== BBC Radio 4 ===
Mayo presented Act Your Age, a panel game for BBC Radio 4, first broadcast on 27 November 2008.

In January 2024 Mayo was the guest on the Radio 4 programme Great Lives; his choice was Alan Freeman.

=== Television projects ===
Shortly after joining on Radio 1, Mayo debuted on the host roster for Top of the Pops. He presented the dilemma show Scruples in 1988, which was adapted from a radio programme that he hosted the previous year.

Between 1995 and 1998, Mayo presented a television version of Confessions, based on the feature from his BBC Radio 1 breakfast and mid-morning shows.

In 1999, he was the original presenter of National Lottery game show Winning Lines on BBC One, until Phillip Schofield took over in 2001.

In 2005 he presented a series The Big Dig on BBC television about allotments in the Rhondda Valley contrasted with others in Highgate, London.

Mayo hosted a revival of the classic quiz show Blockbusters, which began airing on Challenge on 14 May 2012 until 3 August 2012.

He was the announcer for the concert celebrating Queen Elizabeth II's Diamond Jubilee on 4 June 2012.

=== Podcast ===
Following the end of the BBC Radio 5 Live show Kermode and Mayo's Film Review, the pair started the podcast Kermode and Mayo's Take in May 2022. In July 2018 Mayo, along with Matt Williams, began presenting a weekly podcast: Simon Mayo's Books of the Year.

=== Books ===
Confessions, based on the hit feature from his BBC Radio 2 drivetime show, and his former BBC Radio 1 breakfast and mid-morning shows. was released in October 2011. The book is a compilation of the best confessions sent to the show by listeners.

Mayo's debut novel, Itch, was released on 1 March 2012. The titular protagonist is a fourteen-year-old boy who discovers a previously unknown chemical element. The Guardian called it 'a great and thrilling book with an easy to read storyline that will help kids to understand elements!' His second novel Itch Rocks was released in February 2013 and the third instalment, Itchcraft, came out in September 2014.

Itch and Itch Rocks were adapted into an opera, Itch, which premiered on 22 July 2023 at Opera Holland Park. It was commissioned by Opera Holland Park, and composed by Jonathan Dove with libretto by Alasdair Middleton.

His first young adult novel, Blame, was published in July 2016.

Mayo's first novel for adults, Mad Blood Stirring, was published in April 2018 and received mixed reviews. It is a historical novel set in Dartmoor Prison in 1815. Clare Clarke, for The Guardian, said: "With its huge, amorphous cast and little interior characterisation, its pages rich with Shakespeare’s poetry and the rousing gospel music for which Block 4 was reputedly renowned, the dialogue-heavy Mad Blood Stirring reads more like a first-draft film treatment than a finished novel. Mayo has served up all the ingredients he could find, but longer cooking would have given it greater depth and subtlety of flavour." The novelist John Boyne said: "Bristling with energy, written with passion, Mad Blood Stirring is a joy to read."

In 2020 Knife Edge, a first thriller for Mayo, was published. Its setting is drawn from his experiences when an undergraduate at Warwick University, and the denouement is in the neighbouring city of Coventry. The book was promoted as a Sunday Times Top 10 bestseller.

Tick Tock, a thriller based on a mysterious global illness, was published in 2022.

Mayo's third Thriller was released in 2025. Black Tag is set in London, and follows crusading journalist Famie Madden as she investigates a fire in an art gallery in Coal Drop Yards.

== Radio credits ==
- BBC Radio Nottingham – The Simon Mayo Show 10:45 am – 2 pm, 1982–1986
- BBC Radio 1:
  - Saturday evenings 7:30 pm – 9:30 pm, 1986–1987
  - Weekend early mornings 6 am – 8 am, late 1987
  - Monday–Thursday evenings 7:30 pm – 10 pm, January – May 1988
  - Breakfast Show 6 am – 9 am, May 1988 – September 1993
  - Mid Morning Show 9 am – 12 noon, October 1993 – February 2001
- BBC Radio 5 Live:
  - Afternoon Show 1 pm – 4 pm, May 2001 – December 2009
  - Kermode and Mayo's Film Review Friday 2 pm – 4 pm, January 2010 – May 2019; 3 pm – 5 pm, May 2019 – March 2020, August 2021 – February 2022; 2:30 pm – 4 pm, March 2020 – August 2021, February 2022 – April 2022
- BBC Radio 2:
  - Album Chart Show Monday evenings 7 pm – 8 pm, October 2001 – April 2007
  - Music Club Monday nights/Tuesday overnight 11:30 pm – 12:30 am, April 2007 – April 2008
  - Drivetime Monday – Friday 5 pm – 7 pm, 11 January 2010 – 4 May 2018
  - Jo Whiley & Simon Mayo – Monday – Thursday 5 pm – 8 pm; Friday 5 pm – 7 pm, 14 May 2018 – 21 December 2018
- BBC Radio 4 – Act Your Age 6:30 pm, November – December 2008
- Scala Radio:
  - Monday – Saturday mid-mornings 10 am – 1 pm, 4 March 2019 – 26 February 2021
  - Essential Albums. Saturdays 3 pm – 5 pm, 3 April 2021 – 21 May 2023
  - Sunday mid-mornings 10 am – 12 pm, 28 May 2023 – 15 September 2024
- Greatest Hits Radio:
  - Album Show. Sundays 1 pm – 4 pm, 6 September 2020 – present
  - Drivetime Monday – Friday 4 pm – 7 pm, 15 March 2021 – present
- Greatest Hits Radio 80s
- Raiders of the Lost 80s
  - Monday - Friday 10am to 12pm

C.Spring 2025–present

- Magic Classical
  - Sunday mid-mornings 10 am – 12 pm, 22 September 2024 – 12 April 2026

== Personal life ==
While at university, he was a presenter on the student radio station, Radio Warwick. In 2005 the university awarded him an honorary Doctor of Letters.

Mayo is married to Hilary Bird, who had worked at Radio Nottingham since 1984 on Action Line, and also worked for BBC Radio 2 as a producer for Canon Roger Royle and later Don Maclean on Good Morning Sunday from 1987 to 1990. The wedding took place on Saturday 11 October 1986 at St Helen's Church in Burton Joyce, Nottinghamshire. They have two sons and a daughter. Mayo is a supporter of Tottenham Hotspur, and lives in north London.

Mayo was appointed Member of the Order of the British Empire (MBE) in the 2021 Birthday Honours for services to broadcasting.

Media offices
Preceded by Mike Smith	BBC Radio 1 Breakfast Show Presenter; 1988–1993	Succeeded by Mark Goodier
Preceded by Chris Evans	BBC Radio 2 Drivetime Show Presenter; 2010–2018	Succeeded by himself with Jo Whiley
Preceded by himself	BBC Radio 2 Drivetime Show Presenter (with co-host Jo Whiley); 2018	Succeeded by Sara Cox
