= Rebecca Pike =

British journalist

Rebecca Pike is a British journalist currently Vice President External Communications at Liberty Global. Previously she worked as Radio and TV business presenter for the BBC.

== Early life ==
Pike was born in Lewisham, London. She attended Bedales School and Magdalen College, Oxford, where she studied Philosophy, Politics, and Economics.

== Career ==
Pike started her career at the Express and Star in Wolverhampton before moving to the Daily Telegraph. She joined the BBC as a News Trainee.

She then became a business and economics reporter for the BBC. She has worked as a reporter on a number of radio and TV news programmes, including the Today programme, Radio 4's Six O'Clock News, Radio 5 Live, BBC One's TV news bulletins, BBC World Service and the BBC News channel.

In 2009 she worked as a presenter of Wake Up to Money on BBC Radio 5 Live.

In 2011 she appeared as the main overnight presenter on the BBC News channel and BBC World.

She started on Drivetime on Radio 2 in 2006, when Chris Evans began hosting the show. She was nicknamed "Foxy" after the popular "Fox the Fox" feature, in which listeners were invited to try and 'outfox' her with difficult financial questions. She also presented the "Innovation Slot" on the Drivetime programme on Friday at 18:30. Pike left the BBC in December 2015.

In April 2016 Rebecca Pike was appointed Head of Digital Media at Liberty Global working with ex-BBC journalist and Boris Johnson's advisor Guto Harri.

Currently (2025) she is Vice-President External Communications.

== Personal life ==
Pike is half Chinese. She is married with three children, a daughter and two sons, and lives in North-West London.
