= On This Day in History =

BBC Radio 1 show (1988–1993)

On This Day in History is a feature on the BBC Radio 1 breakfast show in the United Kingdom between 1988 and 1993. It was devised by the programme's presenter at the time, Simon Mayo, and was broadcast at approximately 8.45am. Mayo, a history graduate from University of Warwick, used the day's date each morning to regurgitate historical anniversaries and events which had happened on that date in years passed. As a quirk, he would often add a punchline to each of the stories he recounted, and then would get his "crew" (female co-host, newsreader and producer) each to guess the age of living celebrities who were born on that day.

The feature used a looped instrumental version of the George Michael song "I Want Your Sex" as its theme, although the full version was banned from broadcast on Radio 1 when it was released in 1987.

A tie-in book of the same title was published in later years, with much advertisement by the BBC, initially just to give away on the show to a daily winner who rang in with the correct answer to a question posed by Mayo about a specific person or event of relevance to that date.

The feature ended when Mayo left the breakfast show, although when he switched to the mid-morning programme, he revived it in part with a spot called Dead Or Alive?, where he would ask listeners whether celebrities or known figures born on the date in question were still living or not. The feature returned to breakfast radio on the BBC when Chris Evans's revived it for his Radio 2 breakfast show, with a celebrity guest reading events that happened on that particular day in history. The last fact is nearly always music related and directly links into the next song played on the show.

The feature is also often heard in one form or another on many commercial radio stations.
