= Dianne Oxberry =

English broadcaster and meteorologist (1967–2019)

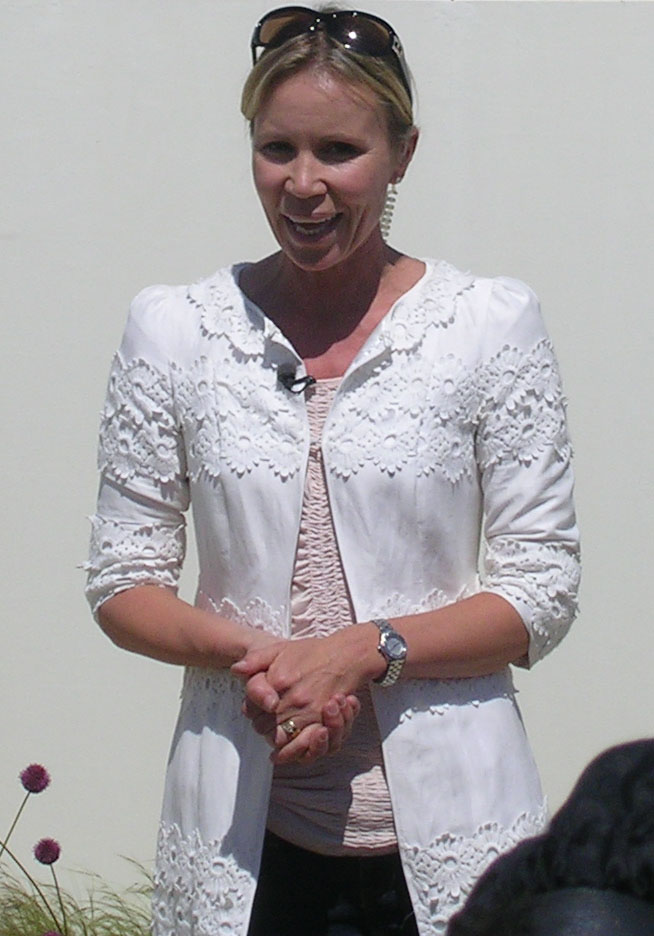
- Oxberry at the 2010 RHS Tatton Park Show
- Born: Dianne Clare Oxberry; 13 August 1967; Sunderland, County Durham, England
- Died: 10 January 2019 (aged 51); Manchester, England
- Cause of death: ovarian cancer
- Occupation: Broadcaster
- Years active: 1985–2018
- Employer(s): BBC; BBC North West
- Television: BBC North West
- Spouse: Ian Hindle (m. 1993)
- Children: 2

Dianne Clare Oxberry (13 August 1967 – 10 January 2019) was an English broadcaster and meteorologist, best known as a long-serving TV and radio presenter for BBC North West.

She presented weather forecasts for the regional news programme North West Tonight for 23 years until her death in 2019.

== Early life ==
Oxberry was born on 13 August 1967 in Sunderland, County Durham, to Francis Joseph Oxberry (1935–1983) and Margaret R. Dent.

== Career ==
Oxberry originally joined the BBC as a personal assistant at Radio 2, having previously auditioned for a presenting role on the youth music series No Limits for BBC2. She began her broadcasting career on Radio 1, working alongside Steve Wright and in March 1990 Diane became part of Simon Mayo's on-air team for the weekday breakfast programme, where, in addition to participating in various elements of the programme, she read the weather and travel news. In 1991, she became a presenter for the second series of the Saturday morning children's TV programme, The 8:15 from Manchester, where she met her husband, cameraman Ian Hindle.

After studying meteorology at the Met Office College in Berkshire, Oxberry joined BBC North West in 1995 as its first dedicated weather presenter. Alongside her forecasting work, she also co-presented the weekday breakfast programme on BBC Radio Manchester (alongside Eamonn O'Neal) and worked as a relief newsreader and presenter for North West Tonight. In later years, she fronted the peak-time regional current affairs programme Inside Out North West.

Oxberry made her last appearance on North West Tonight in mid-December 2018. Her last report for Inside Out was aired posthumously as part of a tribute programme on 21 January 2019.

== Personal life and death ==
Oxberry was married to Ian Hindle in 1993. The couple had two children and lived in Sale, Greater Manchester.

She died at the Christie Hospital, Manchester, on 10 January 2019, aged 51, shortly after being diagnosed with ovarian cancer. Her death was announced publicly the following day.

Her funeral took place on 7 February 2019 at St Mary Magdalene's church in Sale. A memorial service was held at Manchester Cathedral three weeks later on 28 February 2019 - Greater Manchester mayor Andy Burnham described Oxberry as "a true friend of the north west of England".

Ian Hindle, Oxberry's widower, later set up a charity to help patients diagnosed with ovarian cancer. By April, the fund had raised more than £52,000 online.
