= The Identik-Hit Quiz =

The Identik-Hit Quiz was a daily feature on the Simon Mayo Breakfast Show between December 1989 until September 1993.

The quiz ran initially at 6:40 am - when the show began at 6:30 am - then after the programme was extended to a 6 am start, room was found for two rounds a day.

The basic premise was that Mayo, along with all or some of his "crew" (female co-host, newsreader, producer) would "act out" a scene of just seconds in length, the circumstances of which led listeners cryptically to the title of a well-known hit song, from any era. Sometimes sound effects alone were enough to get the clue across; such as when a long clip of a car being driven was played without any deviation in noise for junctions or distractions - hence the correct answer of Road To Nowhere by Talking Heads; or when effects of a heartbeat and a door opening were played in unison - hence the correct answer of Room In Your Heart by Living In A Box.

Memorably, a woman character who gave her name only as "Mrs Day" once rang up and appeared entirely to misunderstand the competition. The cryptic clue running was a clip of the Blue Danube waltz by Strauss, interspersed with rodent-like chattering noises. Mrs Day just thought the answer was the Blue Danube, and Mayo patiently explained to her on air that the competition was slightly more difficult than that. The lady certainly seemed to have happened upon the quiz by accident (she didn't "sound" like a demographically-targeted Radio 1 listener of archetype) and Mayo referred to her in a joking manner for several rounds thereafter. It's possible that the chattering noises could have been misinterpreted for interference on the medium wave which many Radio 1 listeners were still relying on for coverage, with the new FM signal of the time still not yet covering the whole nation. The true correct answer turned out to be Batdance by Prince.

The voice of the Identik-Hit Quiz production package was supplied by Mayo's Radio 1 colleague Bruno Brookes (who had to ditch it and use a generic one when he frequently acted as Mayo's holiday relief) and then later another colleague, Simon Bates. Having used this piece of production as the announcement of the quiz, Mayo would then play the cryptic clip, give the phone number and state what was up for grabs for a correct answer - this prize was in the form of record tokens (later CD tokens when vinyl records began to become obsolete) starting at one on the first day of a new quiz and increasing by one each day until a correct answer was given.

Three callers were taken in each round, with Mayo knowing in advance the answer each were going to give. Mayo would ask each caller who they were, where they were from and - due to habit, tradition, and to give his female co-host a chance to update her forecasts - what the weather was like in their area. He would then take their answer and tell them if they were right or wrong.

One Identik-Hit Quiz ran for so long that Mayo was forced to give extra clues at one point; then he went on a period of paternity leave for several weeks, only for the same cryptic clue still to be running on the quiz when he returned. The round in question featured newsreader Rod McKenzie supposedly falling (McKenzie giving a scream) into water (loud splash). Eventually the answer was finally given by a listener as Islands In The Stream (for the cryptic purposes of the quiz it was "I Lands In The Stream") by Kenny Rogers and Dolly Parton.

Whenever a correct answer was given, Mayo would play a congratulation stab of You! Are! A! Winner! before playing the record in question. After the record, he would then explain the cryptic clue in as little or much detail as deemed necessary.

If a round of the Identik-Hit Quiz was guessed during a relief presenter's time on the show, the new round would feature the voice (if applicable to the clue) of that presenter and would continue even after Mayo had returned.

The Identik-Hit Quiz ended its run after Mayo left the breakfast show in 1993 to become the new mid-morning host. although there is a similar feature on his current Greatest Hits Radio Drivetime show called "Drivetime Drama".
