= Jackie Brambles =

British journalist, radio DJ and television presenter

- Born: 1 March 1967 (age 59); Harlow, Essex, England
- Other name: Jakki Brambles
- Occupations: Journalist, radio DJ and television presenter
- Years active: 1987–present
- Television: Loose Women (2005–09); Lorraine (2010–12)
- Spouses: Jim Sherry (m. 1993; div. 1998) David Todd (m. 2005)
- Children: 2

Jackie Todd Brambles (born 1 March 1967) is a British journalist, radio DJ and television presenter. In the earlier part of her broadcasting career she was known as Jakki Brambles.

== Early life and early career ==
Brambles was born in Harlow, Essex, England and grew up in Ayrshire, Scotland, where she went to secondary school at Ayr Academy in Fort Street, Ayr. She also began her radio career on local radio station West Sound in Ayr when she was 19.

== Career ==
She joined Capital London in 1987 as its youngest DJ, and after a year on the evening show joined the BBC in 1988 and had her own prime time show on the national pop network BBC Radio 1. She took on the Radio 1's early morning show, first at weekends, before moving to weekdays. She also joined her colleagues on the Top of the Pops presentation roster. When Sybil Ruscoe left her role as Simon Mayo's weather and travel reporter on the breakfast show, Brambles took over that slot, thereby keeping her on air every day over two separate programmes.

In 1993 she married a Scotsman named Jim Sherry and left BBC Radio 1 in 1994 to move to the United States, where she lived for 11 years. The marriage ended in 1998. There was a plan to make her an American showbiz reporter for the BBC but this never transpired. Instead, she re-branded herself as the more maturely-spelt Jackie Brambles, and entered American broadcasting in San Francisco as a news radio morning anchor and occasional television news anchor for the CBS network. She also worked as a media consultant to several high-profile companies in Silicon Valley, including Intel, Oracle and Sony. Following a move to Los Angeles in 1999, she took on the role of foreign correspondent for GMTV, interviewing almost every major star in Hollywood as well as covering major news events including two presidential elections and the events of 9/11.

Six months after returning to the UK in 2005, Brambles married David Todd, who works in financial services, and had her first child. After leaving GMTV, she made several guest appearances on Loose Women in 2005. During Kaye Adams's maternity leave in 2006, Brambles hosted the show in Adams' place, which led to her becoming the new leading host of the show. On 7 August 2009, she closed her final show, after presenting 316 episodes between 2005 and 2009.

Brambles owns her own digital media business called Broadstance Digital Media Production.

In June 2009 to 2010, Brambles was a commentator on the political show This Week, where her topic was girl power. Brambles was a presenter of various shows on BBC Radio Scotland. From 2010 until 2012, she guest presented 16 episodes of the ITV Breakfast programme Lorraine.

Since 2015 she has hosted the STV series Stopping Scotland's Scammers.

In December 2021, she was hired by Bauer Radio to replace Darren Proctor on Greatest Hits Radio. On 16 December 2021, Brambles was interviewed by Simon Mayo on Simon Mayo Drivetime. as Jackie herself returns to radio broadcasting after 27 years away. Her show, which started on 4 January 2022, follows Mayo's in the schedules from 19:00 to 22:00 every Monday–Thursday.

== Personal life ==
Brambles married David Todd (born 23 March 1975) on 4 August 2005. The couple have two children, a son Stanley (born 2006) and a daughter Florence (born 2007), as a result of which Brambles left GMTV to concentrate on motherhood.
