= Jo Whiley =

English television and radio personality

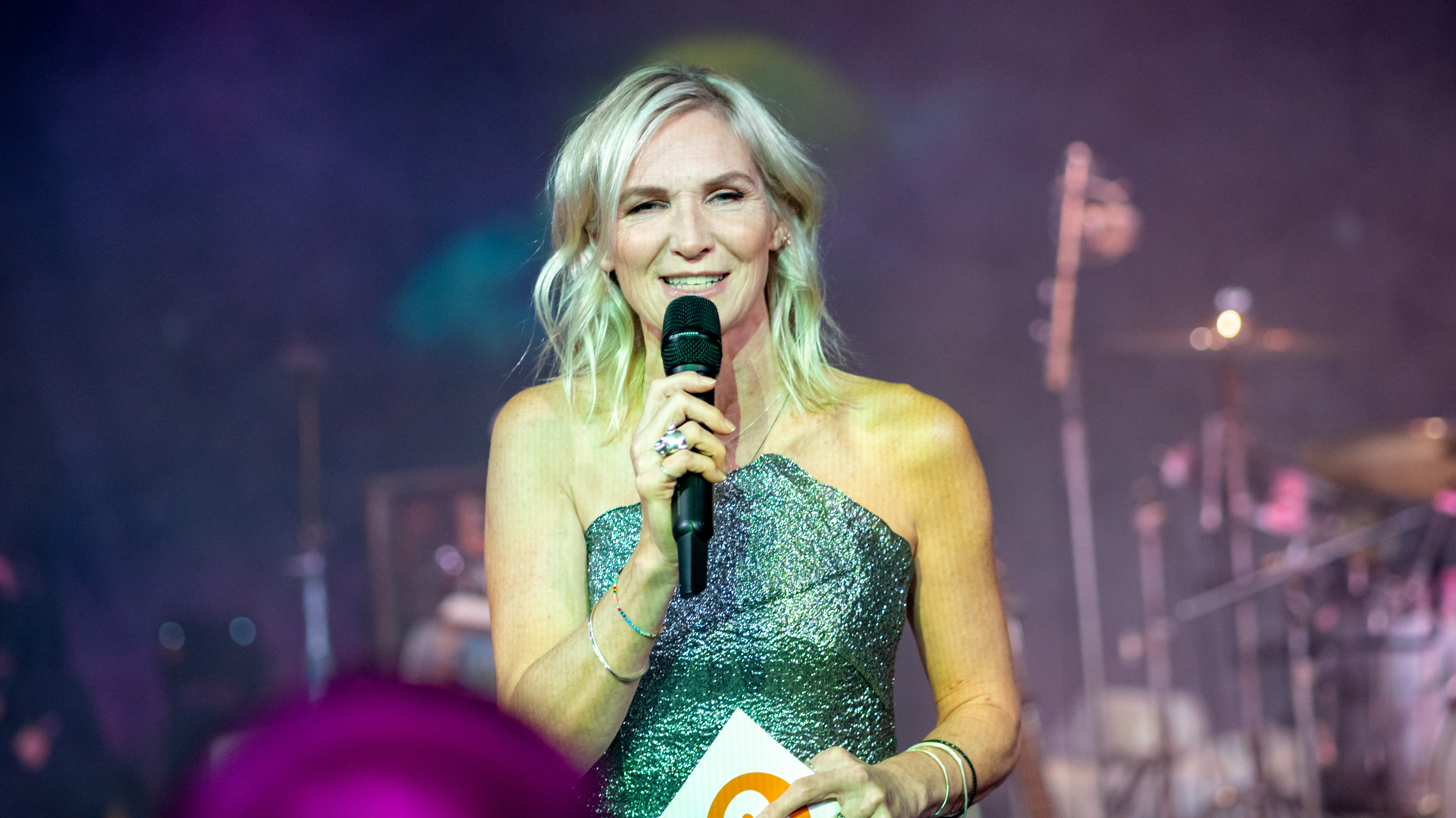
- Whiley hosting a performance at BBC's Broadcasting House in 2021
- Born: Johanne Whiley; 4 July 1965 (age 61); Northampton, Northamptonshire, England
- Spouse: Steve Morton (m. 1991)
- Children: 4
- Parent(s): Martin Whiley (father), Christine Whiley (mother)
- Presenting career
- Station: BBC Radio 2
- Time slot: 19:00–21:00 Monday to Thursday
- Style: DJ
- Country: United Kingdom
- Website: bbc.co.uk/programmes/b00zqcjv

Johanne Whiley-Morton (born 4 July 1965), better known professionally as Jo Whiley, is an English radio DJ and television presenter. She was the host of her long-running radio show on BBC Radio 1 and has since been presenting her weekday evening show on BBC Radio 2. She is also the main presenter for the BBC's Glastonbury Festival coverage.

== Early life and education ==
Whiley was born in Northampton to Martin, an electrician, and Christine, a postmistress. She attended Campion School at Bugbrooke, near Northampton and then studied applied languages at Brighton Polytechnic. She graduated with a lower second-class honours degree. She swam competitively for Northamptonshire.

== Career ==
=== Early career ===
In Whiley's final year of her degree, still unsure of what she wanted to do, a conversation with a lecturer led to a job with BBC Radio Sussex on a show called Turn It Up. It allowed anyone to get on the radio and required Whiley to attend shows and interview the musicians.

After a year, Whiley left for City University London for a one-year course on radio journalism. After writing many letters, she got a job as a researcher on WPFM, a BBC Radio 4 youth culture and music show. When the presenters Terry Christian and Gary Crowley left, she took over, gaining her first presenting role. She then moved into television, producing and presenting the indie show on British Satellite Broadcasting.

Whiley subsequently worked as a researcher and music booker on Channel 4's The Word, where she arranged appearances by acts including Nirvana, L7, Hole and Rage Against The Machine. She was responsible for booking Nirvana for their first British television appearance, performing "Smells Like Teen Spirit" on the programme in November 1991.

While working on The Word, BBC Radio 1 producer Jeff Smith approached Whiley to be one of a number of guest presenters covering for Mark Goodier during the summer of 1993. Shortly after, Whiley was paired up with another of the summer guest presenters - Steve Lamacq and given a seven week slot together. New Radio 1 controller, Matthew Bannister handed them the weekday The Evening Session slot permanently with the objective to make "left-field" music more accessible and bridge the gap between daytime and John Peel's later slot. The new show coincided with the emergence of Britpop. The Evening Session gave Oasis an early four-song Radio 1 session in the first week of 1994, before those songs had been recorded for Definitely Maybe, and had the exclusive first play of The Stone Roses "Love Spreads" in November 1994.

Whiley presented her own show on Saturday afternoon in late 1995. Whiley remained at Radio 1 until March 2011.

From 1995 to 1998, Whiley was a regular guest presenter on Top of the Pops, initially co-presenting with fellow DJ Steve Lamacq before flying solo and alternating with Zoe Ball and Jayne Middlemiss. The three women are referred to by the Top of the Pops website as the '90s girls', as between them they presented nearly every show of 1997. However, the only occasion when all three presented together was on Christmas Day 1997. Whiley returned to the show twice between 2005 and 2006 to co-present with lead presenter Fearne Cotton.

On 24 November 2002, Whiley became the first female presenter of the Radio 1 Chart Show.

In July 2009, Whiley published her autobiography, My World in Motion, on CD through Random House Audiobooks.

=== The Jo Whiley Show on BBC Radio 1 ===
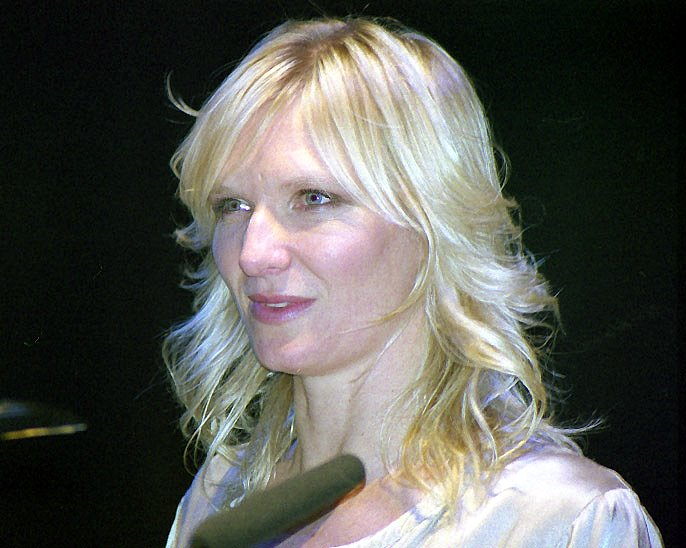
Whiley at the 2005 Student Radio Awards

From February 1997, Whiley had a weekday lunchtime show called The Jo Whiley Show and later The Lunchtime Social. This included elements of the evening show, such as tour dates and occasional live 'sessions' at Maida Vale Studios while working within the restrictions of Radio 1's daytime schedule. When Simon Mayo left BBC Radio 1 for BBC Radio 5 Live and BBC Radio 2 in February 2001, Whiley's show was moved to a mid-morning slot.

In July 2008, The Jo Whiley Show was fined £75,000 for misleading listeners for an incident involving a member of BBC staff posing as a member of the public taking part in a competition. The BBC claim Whiley herself was unaware of the deception at the time of its broadcast.

Jo Whiley's weekday show ended broadcasting in September 2009 as part of a major shake-up of Radio 1's weekday schedule. The shake-up saw Greg James move to the afternoon slot (was occupied by Edith Bowman) and Fearne Cotton move to Whiley's slot. Her final weekday programme took place on 18 September 2009.

The Jo Whiley Show subsequently moved to weekends, airing from 1pm to 4pm. As with her former weekday show, it still featured Live Lounge performances from visiting artists, as well as three new features: Jo's Road Trip, Top of the Shops, and SpellStar. Her last show on BBC Radio 1 was on 27 March 2011.

=== BBC Radio 2 ===
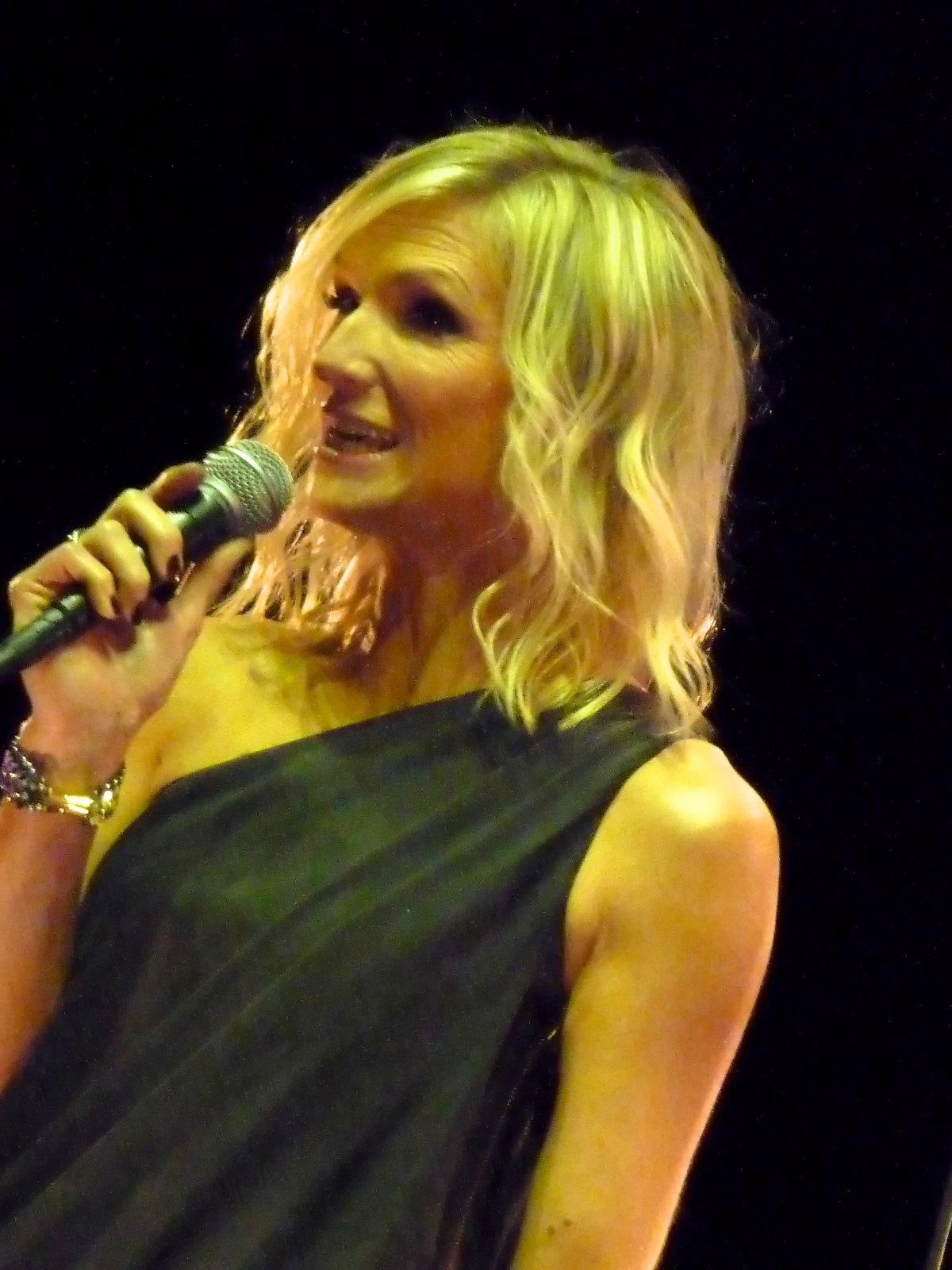
Jo Whiley at the Electric Proms in 2010

Since August 2009, Whiley has been an occasional stand-in presenter for Claudia Winkleman on BBC Radio 2. She was first heard on the network on Friday 21 August and made subsequent appearances on 2 October, 6 November, 27 November and 18 December 2009.

In March 2010, it was announced that Whiley and former BBC Radio 1 presenter Steve Lamacq would present a one-off Evening Session (the first in 13 years) on Good Friday (2 April) for BBC Radio 6 Music. They presented another Evening Session on 28 January 2011. After being an occasional stand-in presenter on BBC Radio 2, Whiley began presenting In Concert on Thursday evenings in April 2010.

On 1 February 2011, it was announced that Whiley would be leaving BBC Radio 1 after 17 years of broadcasting to join BBC Radio 2, where she would present an evening show from Mondays to Thursdays starting on 4 April 2011, replacing The Radcliffe and Maconie Show. Radcliffe and Maconie would, in turn, move to BBC Radio 6 Music while Whiley's Radio 1 show would be taken over by Huw Stephens. Since 2011, she has co-hosted Radio 2 Live in Hyde Park.

In March 2012, the BBC announced that as part of the broadcaster's celebration of the 20th anniversary of Britpop, Whiley and Lamacq would present a week of Evening Sessions on Radio 2 from 7 April.

In January 2018, it was announced that Whiley would join daytime on a drivetime show with Simon Mayo. This was the first time a woman had co-presented a Radio 2 daytime show in 20 years. On 22 October that year, the station announced that Mayo would be leaving Radio 2 after a backlash against the change, with Whiley moving back to an evening slot.

Since as early as 2021 a regular feature on Whiley's Radio 2 show has been the Sofa Session, in which a visiting artist performs live on air (similar to Live Lounge, with both formats typically including an exclusive cover song arranged especially for the occasion). A select few have been guests for both Live Lounge and Sofa Session: Foo Fighters, Coldplay, Crowded House, James, The Flaming Lips, Arcade Fire, Bastille, Fontaines D.C. and Kate Nash. Stornoway were the last to join this list, during a broadcast from Maida Vale Studios on 15 April 2026 in which they debuted an arrangement of Sea of Love (their 2010 Live Lounge appearance having featured an exclusive arrangement of Wiley's "Wearing My Rolex" — retitled "Wearing My Casio" and reworded to reference Whiley herself).

=== Television career ===
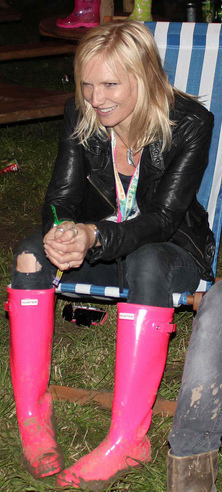
Whiley backstage at the Glastonbury Festival 2011

Whiley presents televised coverage of major music festivals, such as the Glastonbury Festival. She also narrated the BBC Three series Little Angels. In October 2007, she became a judge on the T4 (Channel 4) show Orange unsignedAct which searches for a band trying to get a record deal. Whiley also hosted a music TV show on music channel TMF. From late 1998, Whiley hosted her own music discussion show on Channel 4, called Jo Whiley, made by At It Productions which ran for four series until late 2001.

On 15 March 2010, Whiley presented an edition of the Panorama documentary strand titled Are the Net Police Coming for You? in which she looked at the Digital Economy Bill, a proposed new law targeting people who download music illegally from the Internet.

In 2014, Whiley was a contestant on the Children in Need special of Swashbuckle with her daughter Coco.

In July 2021, Whiley was a co-presenter for the BBC's coverage of the Hampton Court Garden Festival.

In 2022, The Killers' singer, Brandon Flowers, dedicated a performance of their song Pressure Machine to her saying "She's always sorta championed us ... she's said some wonderful things about this song and she's requested it tonight"

== Personal life ==
Whiley married music executive Steve Morton in July 1991 in Northampton. The couple live in Towcester, Northamptonshire and have four children.

In October 2014, she was presented with a BASCA Gold Badge award. Whiley is a pescetarian.

In February 2021, during the COVID-19 pandemic, Whiley's sister Frances, who has learning difficulties and diabetes, was admitted to hospital after testing positive for COVID-19 following an outbreak in her care home. Frances, who is two years younger than Whiley, has Cri du chat genetic syndrome. Whiley publicly campaigned for those in her sister's category to receive priority in the COVID-19 vaccination programme roll-out. She repeated the plea during an interview on BBC's The Andrew Marr Show, on 21 February 2021. On 24 February the government announced that everyone with a registered learning disability would be prioritised for a COVID-19 vaccine.

== Charity work ==
Whiley has been a patron of the charity Sibs, since 2021, a charity that supports the brothers and sisters of disabled children and adults. She is also a celebrity ambassador for Mencap, a UK charity that works to support people with learning disabilities. She hosts the Little Noise Sessions concert in aid of Mencap. She is also a supporter of Tommy's – The Baby Charity. Whiley is the patron of the cri du chat syndrome support group.

On 19 March 2014, Whiley undertook a challenge for Sport Relief, in which she walked, jogged and ran on a treadmill for 26 hours, with a five-minute rest break each hour. She did this to raise money for the Sport Relief appeal that same week. While completing the challenge she hosted two radio shows. The achievement impressed members of the band Coldplay, who donated £260,000 to Sport Relief.

Media offices
Preceded by Simon Mayo	BBC Radio 2 Drivetime Show Co-Presenter (with Simon Mayo); 2018	Succeeded by Sara Cox
