= Sybil Ruscoe =

British radio and television presenter

Sybil Ruscoe DL (born 8 August 1960 in Wem, Shropshire, England) is a British radio and television presenter.

Ruscoe began her career on the Express & Star newspaper in Wolverhampton. She moved to Radio Wyvern, Beacon Radio, then BBC Radio Shropshire. She was teamed with Simon Mayo on Radio 1 Breakfast in 1988 and 89. She also started presenting television during this period, including Top of the Pops.

She was a presenter of Radio 1 Newsbeat and News 90, News 91, News 92 and News 93. In 1994, Ruscoe and John Inverdale were the first presenters hired by BBC Radio 5 Live. Ruscoe presented the afternoon show for five years. In 1999, she joined the BAFTA and RTS award-winning Channel 4 Cricket. She was the first woman to present cricket on TV, and was named a Cosmopolitan Inspirational Woman of the Year. From 1999 to 2007, Ruscoe wrote a cricket column for the Daily Telegraph.

She used to be a presenter on Farming Today on BBC Radio 4.

Ruscoe co-wrote the Official Book of the London 2012 Olympic and Paralympic Games with her husband, Tom Knight, the former athletics correspondent of the Daily Telegraph.

Ruscoe is a supporter of Stoke City Football Club.

In 2021, she was made an executive director of the Gloucestershire Cricket Board and a Deputy Lieutenant for Gloucestershire. In 2022, she became farming and countryside advisor on the long-running radio soap The Archers.
