= Ric Blaxill =

British radio personality

Richard Eric Blaxill (born 19 July 1962) is a British radio and TV music producer and music programming director.

== Career ==
=== Radio 1 ===
From 1988 to 1994, he was producer/senior producer at BBC Radio 1.

=== Top of the Pops ===
From 1994 to 1997, he was producer and executive producer for BBC 1's Top of the Pops, and later A&R director for Independiente Records. He was largely responsible for livening the format of the programme into its final incarnation. His boss was David Liddiment.

=== ITV ===
From 1998 to 2000, he was the development and series producer for SMTV Live and CD:UK and development and series producer for Friday Night's All Wright with Ian Wright, then from 2000 until 2001, he was creative director on Stormlive Digital and Internet Radio.

He became series producer for LWT/Sky's The Pop Years, a music documentary series looking at the years 1980 to 1999. He was group creative director at Capital Radio before going to BBC 6 Music in 2004.

=== 6 Music ===
Blaxill was the Head of Programmes at the BBC 6 Music radio station from 2004 to 2007, but was required to resign following "serious" editorial breaches. During his tenure at BBC 6 Music, the station achieved record listening figures and won Best Radio Station twice (2005 and 2007) at the BT Digital Music Awards.

=== Radio ===
In 2007, Blaxill joined Bauer Media as Music and Content Director for its radio division.

He also contributes to the BBC 'Sound Of' poll and sits as a judge at the Sony Radio Academy Awards and the Ivor Novello songwriting awards.

== Honours ==
Blaxill was a judge at the Sony Radio Academy Awards, and was nominated for Station Programmer of the Year in 2005 and 2007. He was awarded a 'Fellowship of the Radio Academy' in 2014.
