= Steve Wright (DJ) =

English radio presenter (1954–2024)

Steve Wright MBE
- Wright in the BBC Radio 1 studio
- Born: Stephen Richard Wright; 26 August 1954; Greenwich, London, England
- Died: 12 February 2024 (aged 69); Marylebone, London, England
- Other names: DJ Silly Boi; Wrighty
- Occupations: Radio personality; disc jockey
- Years active: 1976–2024
- Known for: Steve Wright in the Afternoon; The Radio 1 Breakfast Show; Steve Wright's Saturday Show; Sunday Love Songs; Steve Wright's Summer Nights; Pick of the Pops
- Spouse: Cyndi Robinson (m. 1985; div. 1999)
- Children: 2
- Presenting career
- Country: United Kingdom

Stephen Richard Wright (26 August 1954 – 12 February 2024) was an English disc jockey, radio personality and occasional television presenter credited with introducing the morning zoo format to British radio with a humorous collection of personalities. He presented Steve Wright in the Afternoon for 12 years on BBC Radio 1 and 23 years on BBC Radio 2, two of the BBC's national radio stations. He continued to present his Sunday Love Songs on Radio 2 until his death and, in October 2023, he took over as the host of the long-running Pick of the Pops chart show. On BBC Television, Wright hosted Home Truths, Steve Wright's People Show, Auntie's TV Favourites, Top of the Pops and TOTP2.

Wright won Best DJ of the Year, as voted by the Daily Mirror Readers Poll and by Smash Hits in 1994. In 1998, he was awarded TRIC Personality of the Year for his radio programmes. He was appointed Member of the Order of the British Empire (MBE) in the 2024 New Year Honours for services to radio. He was described by Paul Gambaccini as being "among the all-time greats of radio".

== Early life and career ==
Stephen Richard Wright was born on 26 August 1954 in Greenwich, and grew up in New Cross, in South London. He had a brother, Laurence. Their father, Richard, managed the Burton's store in Trafalgar Square.

After the family moved to Essex, Wright attended the Eastwood High School for Boys near Southend-on-Sea, where he broadcast a nascent radio show over the speaker system from the stock cupboard. Having finished school with only three O‑levels, he worked in maritime insurance and as a local newspaper reporter. He joined the BBC staff in the early 1970s working as a returns clerk in the Gramophone Library in Egton House, opposite Broadcasting House in London, before leaving to start broadcasting in 1976 at Radio 210 Thames Valley in Reading, Berkshire, where he would present the weekday breakfast show in the latter part of his tenure. He also presented a weekend 'double-header' with Mike Read, called the Read & Wright Show. In 1979, Wright got his big break at Radio Luxembourg, where he presented his own nightly show. He was known for the characters he created, and referred to himself as DJ Silly Boi during the Friday afternoon Serious Jockin' segment of his Radio 2 programme in latter years.

== BBC Radio 1 ==
In November 1979, it was announced that Wright would join BBC Radio 1 in January 1980, initially taking over a Saturday evening slot, before moving to Saturday mornings later that year.

=== Steve Wright in the Afternoon ===
Wright moved to daytime radio with Steve Wright in the Afternoon in 1981, and it is regularly stated in articles and features on Steve that he introduced the zoo format to the UK. His producer at the time, however, Jonathan Ruffle, has since documented that Steve's show consisted of far more elements than zoo-style multiple personalities in the studio.

In October 1983, Wright took over a Sunday morning show entitled Steve Wright on Sunday, which meant he presented weekday afternoons from Mondays to Thursdays, with Gary Davies being the first to take over Friday afternoon's show, until he moved to the lunchtime programme in March 1984. He was then replaced by Adrian John until September of that year, when Mark Page took over for almost a year, until Paul Jordan replaced him until May 1986, when Wright's Sunday morning show ended, leading to him returning to five afternoons a week.

The first run of Steve Wright in the Afternoon was from 1981 to 1993 on BBC Radio 1. The show had a cast of telephone characters created and performed by Gavin McCoy, Peter Dickson, Richard Easter and Phil Cornwell. Like his mentor, Kenny Everett, Wright went out of his way to be irreverent, including stories taken from the Weekly World News. The success led to a hit single, I'll Be Back, released under the name Arnee and the Terminaters. In later years, the style changed, dumping most of the characters and instead having a new format with spoof guests and comedy sketches. A "posse" of producers and radio staff joined in. Another regular character was "Mr Angry from Purley".

The Smiths' 1986 hit single "Panic" was inspired by Wright playing "I'm Your Man" by Wham! following a news bulletin about the Chernobyl nuclear disaster. Johnny Marr and Morrissey were listening and were disturbed by the contrast in tone. The song's lyrics about the event finished; "Hang the DJ" and this slogan appeared on a promotional T-shirt above a picture of Wright. The DJ took it well and bought one of the T-shirts.

=== Radio 1 Breakfast ===
In 1994, Wright and his Posse moved to the Radio 1 breakfast show, which was renamed Steve Wright in the Morning. He resigned from the breakfast show in 1995 due to differences with the BBC Radio 1 management and a fall in ratings. This coincided with many of the more established DJs leaving, or being sacked, around this time.

== Commercial radio ==
Wright was picked up by the new station Talk Radio in 1995, where he presented a Saturday morning show. He also presented a Sunday morning show, which was heard on a number of GWR radio stations around the UK.

== BBC World Service ==
Wright joined the BBC World Service on 5 January 1999, presenting a 1-hour programme, Wright Around The World. This show ran every Saturday afternoon until the final show on 25 October 2003. This meant that he was now broadcasting on BBC Radio for seven days a week.

== BBC Radio 2 ==
Wright joined BBC Radio 2 in March 1996, where he began presenting Steve Wright's Saturday Show until June 1999, and Steve Wright's Sunday Love Songs until his eventual death in 2024. Wright then returned to afternoons from July 1999 to September 2022. In 2006, Wright was said to earn £440,000 a year at Radio 2. In 2018–2019, Wright's salary was between £465,000 and £469,000, making him the BBC's fifth-highest-earning presenter. He had taken an £85,000 pay cut from the year before, however, as part of an effort to equalise male and female pay.

=== Steve Wright in the Afternoon ===
In July 1999, following a shake-up at Radio 2, Steve Wright in the Afternoon was revived, with Wright taking over this slot from Ed Stewart. Jonathan Ross took over Wright's Saturday morning slot.

Wright presented his Radio 2 version of Steve Wright in the Afternoon on weekday afternoons from 2pm to 5pm, alongside Tim Smith and Janey Lee Grace, who have both also occasionally appeared as relief presenters on the station, as well as traffic reporters Sally Boazman and Bobbie Pryor. Another frequent contributor, "The Old Woman", was played by Joyce Frost who died in November 2016. Smith and Wright would regularly present "factoids", described as "gleaming nuggets of information so incredible that they really shouldn't be true, but are!"

On 1 July 2022, Wright announced that the show would end in September, to be replaced by a new show with Scott Mills. Wright would remain on Radio 2 to continue hosting Sunday Love Songs, along with a new Serious Jockin' podcast and seasonal specials. The final show was broadcast on 30 September 2022, with Wright playing "Radio Ga Ga" by Queen as his last record.

=== Sunday Love Songs ===
Sunday Love Songs, which Wright presented solo on Sunday mornings on Radio 2 from 31 March 1996 until 11 February 2024, the day before his death, featured a blend of classic love songs, dedications and real-life romance stories. In 2013, the BBC Trust's editorial standards committee criticised the show for breaches of guidelines on accuracy and audience interaction, after media reporting revealed that the show was in fact recorded on Fridays.

Wright's final broadcast, on the day before his death, but recorded two days earlier, was a special Valentine's Day edition of this show. The following week, a special programme aired, hosted by Liza Tarbuck, reading out messages from people who had a dedication from Wright over the last 28 years of Sunday Love Songs, and playing a selection of Wright's favourite tracks. The show continued with temporary host Nicki Chapman from 25 February, and on 2 April, it was announced that Michael Ball would be taking over the programme in June.

=== Steve Wright's Summer Nights ===
Between 21 and 24 August 2023, Wright took over the evening show for a week to host Steve Wright's Summer Nights between 7 and 9pm.

=== Pick of the Pops ===
On 10 August 2023, it was announced that Wright would become the new host of Pick of the Pops from 21 October 2023, replacing Paul Gambaccini. He presented the show until 10 February 2024. On 15 April, it was announced that Mark Goodier would take over the show in July. Gary Davies took over this programme during the interim period.

== Career outside radio ==
From 1980 to 1989, Wright was a regular presenter on Top of the Pops. Wright also presented a BBC television series, Steve Wright's People Show, from 1994 to 1995. His next stint in television was as the narrator and writer of the retro pop show Top of the Pops 2 between 1997 and 2009. The last episode of TOTP2 he presented was the Michael Jackson special broadcast on 27 June 2009.

=== UK chart hits ===
Whilst a radio presenter on BBC Radio 1, Wright was involved in a number of UK chart hits with members of his Afternoon Posse (the drive time radio team) including the UK top 10 hit "I'll Be Back" which featured Wright as a member of the backing band the Terminaters, on the 29 August 1991 edition of BBC One's Top of the Pops.

- Young Steve and the Afternoon Boys – "I'm Alright" (RCA Records 1982, single) - UK No. 40
- Steve Wright and the Sisters of Soul – "Get Some Therapy" (RCA Records 1983, single) - UK No. 75
- Steve Wright – "The Gay Cavalieros (The Story So Far...)" (MCA 1984, single) - UK No. 61 in December 1984
- Mr. Angry with Steve Wright – "I'm So Angry" (MCA 1985, single) - UK No. 90 in August 1985
- Mr Food – "And That's Before Me Tea!" (Tangible Records, single) - UK No. 62 in April 1990
- Arnee and the Terminaters – "I'll Be Back" (Epic Records 1991, single) - UK No. 5

== Accolades ==
Wright won awards, including Best DJ of the Year as voted by the Daily Mirror Readers Poll and by Smash Hits in 1994. In 1998 he was awarded TRIC Personality of the Year for his radio programmes.

Wright was appointed Member of the Order of the British Empire (MBE) in the 2024 New Year Honours for services to radio.

== Personal life ==
Wright was married on 8 June 1985 to Cyndi Robinson, an American journalist he had met when working in Reading. The couple had two children and they divorced in 1999.

Wright lived in Marylebone, London, close to Broadcasting House. In July 2019, he told the Daily Mirror that he did not have time to look for a new partner, because he worked so much on his radio programmes. He said, "I work on an afternoon show on the BBC, and I do a love songs show at the weekend, and it means that I do a lot of interviews, and I prep a lot and I write a lot. So I have to work all the time." He revealed that the Rolling Stones were his favourite music act. He was rumoured to be allergic to feathers and penicillin and had spoken out about his weight issues.

=== Death ===
Wright died on 12 February 2024, aged 69, at his home in Marylebone, London. The London Ambulance Service responded to an incident at 10:07 that morning; Wright was pronounced dead at the scene. Police said that the death was "unexpected", but was not being treated as suspicious. His death was announced by his family the following day.

Following his death, it was reported that Wright had undergone undisclosed heart bypass surgery in 2022. Wright's brother blamed his death on an unhealthy diet and said that he had been reluctant to discuss health issues. Friends of Wright have suggested that he struggled to come to terms with ex-wife Cyndi's death in 2020, at her home in Midhurst, West Sussex during the COVID-19 pandemic.

His death was first reported on BBC Radio 2 during 13 February's 5pm bulletin, by newsreader Mike Powell, who regularly read the news on Steve Wright's afternoon show. Tributes were then led, on air, by fellow Radio 2 DJ Sara Cox. His colleague Tony Blackburn wrote on X, and spoke on the PM programme on BBC Radio 4, Sky News and BBC Newsnight of his long friendship with Wright. BBC director-general Tim Davie described Wright as "...a truly wonderful broadcaster who has been a huge part of so many of our lives over many decades.... He was the ultimate professional – passionate about the craft of radio and deeply in touch with his listeners." The BBC announced a special schedule of programming remembering Wright, across both television and radio, four days after his death.

Wright's death certificate stated listed cause of death as a ruptured ulcer in his stomach.

== Books ==
- Steve Wright's Book of the Amazing But True: Trivia for the Connoisseur, Pocket Books (1995) ISBN 978-0671854829
- Just Keep Talking: Story of the Chat Show, Simon & Schuster (1997) ISBN 978-0684816999
- Steve Wright's Book of Factoids, HarperCollins Publishers (UK), (2005) ISBN 0-00-720660-7
- Steve Wright's Further Factoids, HarperCollins Publishers (UK), (2007) ISBN 978-0007255191

Media offices
Preceded by Mark Goodier	BBC Radio 1 Breakfast Show Presenter; 1994–1995	Succeeded by Chris Evans
