= I'll Be Back (disambiguation) =

I'll be back is a catchphrase commonly associated with characters played by actor Arnold Schwarzenegger.

"I'll Be Back" may also refer to one of several songs:

- "I'll Be Back", a 1964 song by the Beatles
- "I'll Be Back", a 2010 song by 2PM
- "I'll Be Back", a 1991 song by Arnee and the Terminaters parodying Schwarzenegger and the Terminator character
- "I'll Be Back", a song by the Who from the 2019 album Who

== See also ==
- We'll Be Back (disambiguation)
