= Janey Lee Grace =

English singer, author, television presenter and radio disc jockey

- Born: 4 March 1960 (age 66); Nottingham, England
- Occupations: Television presenter, radio personality, singer, author
- Known for: Solo recording, backing vocals

Janey Lee Grace (born 4 March 1960) is an English singer, author, television (VH-1 and ITV) presenter and radio disc jockey, first with Virgin Radio as a travel reporter and then graduating to her own late night show for the station.

== Career ==
Grace was born in Nottingham. Her father was a chef. She began her career singing backing vocals for George Michael, Kim Wilde, Mari Wilson and Boy George, toured the world with Wham! for three years, and released a solo single "Heartbeat Radio" in 1988. She also sang vocals on a cover of the Donna Summer song, "Love To Love You Baby" by Euro House dance act Bali in February 1989. Her own chart success came in the summer of 1991 when she teamed up with Saint Etienne and local keyboardist Andrew Midgley to form the dance act Cola Boy, reaching No. 8 in the UK Singles Chart with "7 Ways to Love". It also reached No. 9 on the U.S. Hot Dance Club Play chart in 1991. She also appeared on the follow-up single "He is Cola", released in September of the same year, and recorded a cover version of the Cyndi Lauper song "Time After Time" with Hyperstate which was released on M&G Records (MAGS 34) in January 1993 and reached No. 71 in the UK charts. In 1994 she co-wrote "Love Your Sexy...!!" for girl band Byker Grooove, a spin-off single from the BBC series Byker Grove, which reached No. 48 in the UK charts.

On 5 July 1999, BBC Radio 2 launched a rebooted Steve Wright in the Afternoon, and Grace was the female co-host alongside Steve Wright and Richard Easter – later Tim Smith and (until her death in 2016) the 'Old Woman' Joyce Frost.

Janey had her own show from 4 am – 6 am (later 3 am – 6 am) on Saturday mornings, beginning on 11 February 2000 which lasted until late 2006, when she was replaced by her Steve Wright in the Afternoon co-host, Tim Smith.

Grace covered Wright's Sunday Love Songs on BBC Radio 2 in December 2007 and January 2008.

She also filled in during April 2010, when Wright was on holiday in the United States and was then forced to remain there, due to the volcanic eruptions in Iceland.

In July–August 2010 and January 2011, she also sat in for Wright on his Sunday show while he was on holiday.

On 1 July 2022 Wright announced Steve Wright in the Afternoon was to end in autumn 2022. It was also announced that Grace and Tim Smith were also to leave BBC Radio 2.

Grace ended her final programme on Steve Wright in the Afternoon on 30 September 2022, thus also leaving BBC Radio 2 after 23 years at the station.

== Bibliography ==
Janey Lee Grace released four books as part of the Imperfectly Natural series. These include:

- Grace, Janey Lee (2005). Imperfectly Natural Woman. Crown House Publishing. ISBN 978-1-904424-89-5.
- Grace, Janey Lee (2007). Imperfectly Natural Baby and Toddler. Orion. ISBN 978-0-7528-8589-6.
- Grace, Janey Lee (2008). Imperfectly Natural Home: The Organic Bible. Orion. ISBN 978-0-7528-8582-7.
- Grace, Janey Lee (2024). From WHAM! to WOO: A Life on the Mic. McNidder & Grace. ISBN 978-0857162748.
