= Gavin McCoy =

English radio broadcaster

Gavin McCoy is an English radio broadcaster born and educated in Oxford, England, who has worked on Steve Wright's show and as programme controller for Smooth Radio.
