= Arnee and the Terminaters =

British novelty one-hit wonder music group

Arnee and the Terminaters performing "I'll Be Back" on Top of the Pops in 1991

Arnee and the Terminaters were a British novelty one-hit wonder music group known for their 1991 single "I'll Be Back" which parodies the Terminator franchise.

== "I'll Be Back" ==
"I'll Be Back" (subtitled "The Dancefloor Devastation Kick-Up" on the back of the single sleeve) was performed on screen by Greg Sewell as Arnee, written and produced by Richard Easter (a member of Steve Wright's "posse" on his BBC Radio 1 show of the time) and Mike Woolmans.

It was released on the Epic label, and entered the UK Singles Chart in August 1991, peaking at No. 5. In Australia, the song peaked at number 20.

The song parodies both Austrian actor Arnold ("Arnie") Schwarzenegger's in-film catchphrase, "I'll be back" and his role in the Terminator films, particularly Terminator 2: Judgment Day, which had been released the previous month. Many phrases from the latter film are featured, such as "I'll be back", "Hasta la vista, baby", "It's nothing personal" and "I swear I will not hurt anybody". Also referenced is "If you're lying, I'll be back", which is not from either of the then-extant Terminator films but was in fact from the 1980 exploitation film The Exterminator. However, a similar line was used by Schwarzenegger in the 1988 film Twins ( "If you're lying to me...I'll be back").

=== Lyrical themes ===
Lyrically, "I'll Be Back" consists of singer and protagonist "Arnee" informing the listener that "it's not that I'm ill-mannered or a psychopathic hater, I just like to be treated right like any Terminator" before driving home the central message that "you don't need 'please' or 'thank you', you just need 'I'll be back'". In the final verse, he advises the listener to follow the same path in difficult situations such as when "your lover gives you the elbow or you're threatened with the sack".
