= The O-Zone =

BBC weekly music magazine show

- Created by: Rowan Ayers
- Presented by: Andy Crane; Andi Peters; Philippa Forrester; Toby Anstis; Jayne Middlemiss; Jamie Theakston; Zoë Ball; Mark Franklin
- Country of origin: United Kingdom
- Original language: English

Production
- Executive producers: Mike Appleton; Paul Smith

Original release
- Network: BBC One; BBC Two
- Release: 10 July 1989 – 13 August 2000

The O Zone was a weekly music magazine show broadcast on BBC from 1989 to 2000 made by BBC Children's Presentation with latest news on pop and rock and other genres and interviews with music stars. The first series was presented by Andy Crane on BBC One as a ten-minute filler each weekday morning during the summer school holidays, before switching to a Sunday-morning slot from October that year and would run until January for the first 3 years before becoming an all year round series from 4 October 1992. The series continued as a five-to-15-minute filler shown during school holidays and Sunday mornings on CBBC throughout the year, hosted by CBBC presenters Andi Peters, Philippa Forrester, Toby Anstis and Zoë Ball. The holiday slots ended after summer 1994 and the series soon earned a peak time slot on Fridays from 9 September that year with a Sunday repeat on its usual slot.

The show was given an overhaul and makeover from 18 September 1995, with Jayne Middlemiss and Jamie Theakston as the new dual presenters. The series was moved to Monday evening with Sunday repeat. The series was extended to 20 minutes from September 1996 and the series largely remained until the final edition on 13 August 2000 with the last episodes only shown on Sundays mornings.

There was a spin-off series, The Pop Zone, shown on Saturday mornings during summer months in 1998 and 1999 hosted weekly by various pop stars and there was also a phone in show called The Phone Zone shown on digital channel UK Play which was shown daily on afternoons from channel's launch in 1998 until 2000.

On 8th October 2000, The O Zone was replaced by Top of the Pops Plus, which had already been on UK Play as Top of the Pops@Play in which replaced The Phone Zone a few weeks earlier. The programme was axed in 2001 with the last edition on 26 August.
