= We'll Be Back (disambiguation) =

"We'll Be Back" is a 2022 single by Megadeth.

We'll be back, we'll be right back, and similar phrases may also refer to:

- "After These Messages... We'll Be Right Back!", Buffy the Vampire Slayer comicbook
- "We'll Be Right Back", 1986 single by Steinski and Mass Media
- "We'll Be Right Back", album track from Live!! New York City 10/14/94 by They Might Be Giants

== See also ==
- I'll Be Back (disambiguation)
