= Jayne Middlemiss =

English TV presenter and former model

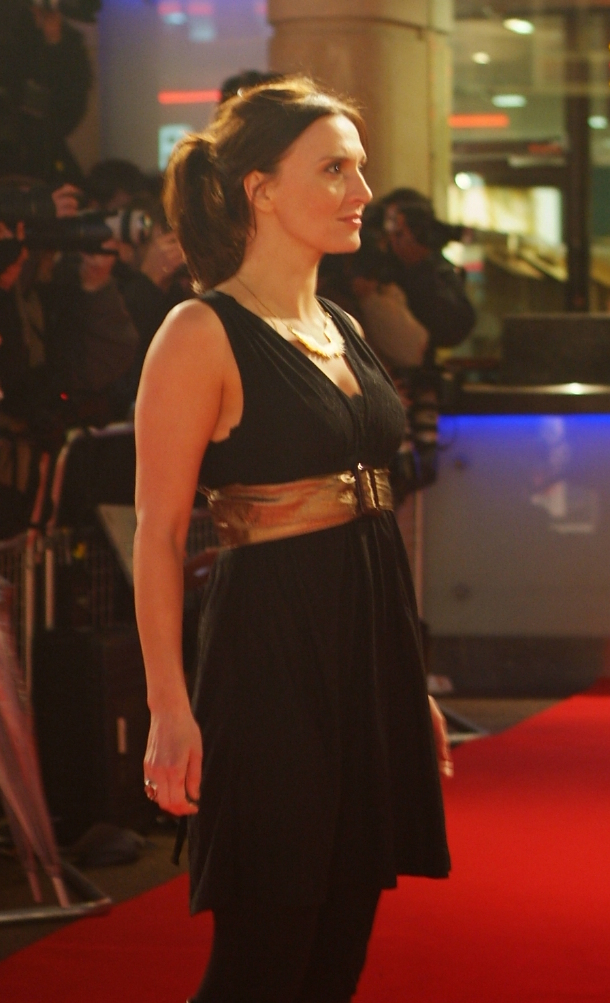
- Middlemiss in 2007
- Born: 1970 or 1971 (age 54–55); Bedlington, Northumberland, England
- Occupations: Television & radio presenter; former model
- Years active: 1991–present
- Television: The O-Zone; Top of the Pops; Robot Wars; The Games; Live from Studio Five

Jayne Middlemiss (born 1970 or 1971) is an English television and radio presenter. She began presenting music television shows including The O Zone and Top of the Pops in the mid-1990s, as well as other television and radio shows, including on BBC Radio 6 Music. She has won both Celebrity MasterChef and reality show Celebrity Love Island.

== Early life ==
Middlemiss was born and raised in the town of Bedlington in Northumberland. Her father was a miner and her mother was a factory worker. She attended Whitley Memorial C of E First School, followed by Meadowdale Middle School and later Bedlingtonshire Community High School.

== Career ==
=== Modelling ===
Middlemiss first worked in an electrical store, but left for London. In 1991, Middlemiss started out as a glamour model; within a year, she left that behind to pursue a career in the media.

=== Television ===
==== Music presenting ====
Middlemiss worked for Noel Edmonds and Chris Evans before briefly working as a nanny, a shop assistant and a waitress. She worked for only two weeks as a trainee researcher on GMTV with Peter McHugh, before gaining her first presenting job on music show The O Zone with Jamie Theakston from 1995. She gained the audition for The O Zone after she met presenter Toby Anstis at a party and he gave her tape to the producer. She then presented the Smash Hits Awards, The Phone Zone and Top of the Pops and its spin-off radio show on BBC Radio 1. She also regularly covered Jo Whiley's show and various other programmes on the same station.

After hosting live coverage of Glastonbury Festival and the Edinburgh Fringe Festival, Middlemiss presented Rough Cut and Dog's Balearics. She was one of the original presenters on the new digital station BBC Radio 6 Music in 2002, presenting the Music Week, where she remained until she left in April 2004.

==== Mainstream work ====
Middlemiss began presenting fashion show She's Gotta Have It in 2000, going on to front three series. She went on to present some of the BBC's Holiday – On a Shoestring programmes, to destinations across the globe before co-hosting the LA Pool Party series with Lisa Snowdon, which won a TRIC Award. In 2003, Middlemiss was a panellist on ITV's Loose Women.

In 2004, for Five TV, Middlemiss presented the dating show What Women Want, before co-presenting the seventh series of Robot Wars, alongside Craig Charles and The Games with Jamie Theakston.

In 2005, she appeared on ITV's Celebrity Love Island and became emotionally involved with footballer Lee Sharpe. The pair did not become a couple, however, despite the producers of the show sending them on a trip in a 'make or break' boat. She eventually went on to win the show, alongside Fran Cosgrave. In 2006 she returned to Fiji to host Love Island's sister show Aftersun on ITV2.

In 2005, Middlemiss presented Family Forensics UK on Living TV, but the show was taken off air after the first episode was broadcast. Other recent credits include coverage of Live 8 for commercial radio, ITV2's coverage of the British Comedy Awards and Soapstar Superstar, work as a reporter for GMTV and Richard & Judy and appearances as a 'talking head' in a number of celebrity-based documentaries. In 2007, Middlemiss presented the third series of the Orange Playlist for ITV on Thursday nights.

In 2009, Middlemiss won Celebrity MasterChef.

In 2010, Middlemiss was a guest presenter on Live from Studio Five. She replaced Emma Willis, who left to front the new series of the Big Brother spin-off Big Brother's Little Brother, alongside George Lamb. Middlemiss presented the show alongside Kate Walsh and Ian Wright (until his departure in August 2010). Middlemiss left Live From Studio Five in December 2010.

Middlemiss featured on Pointless Celebrities on BBC One in December 2012 alongside Theakston, winning the episode.

In 2018 Middlemiss started presenting the Weekend Breakfast Show on Panda Radio.

In 2019, Middlemiss joined Absolute Radio and covered for Sarah Champion for two weeks on Absolute 80s.

In July 2021, Middlemiss covered weekend breakfast on Virgin Radio UK, in the absence of Amy Voce. She also covered for other regular presenters including Eddy Temple-Morris during the 2021 Christmas and New Year holidays.

== Personal life ==
Middlemiss lives in Belsize Park, London. She dated: TV producer Andy Davies; from 2000 to 2002 TV director Eliot Fletcher; and Irish model Alan Byrne from 2007 to 2008.

A committed follower of yoga since around 1995, in 2005 Middlemiss released the DVD Jayne Middlemiss – Love Yoga. In 2006, Middlemiss narrated a documentary about a yoga retreat for the BBC. She was also seen in A Beginners Guide to ... Yoga for Channel 4 (2007).

== Television and radio credits ==
- The O-Zone
- Top of the Pops (1997-2001)
- Robot Wars
- The Games
- Live from Studio Five
- Celebrity Mastermind (2023)
- Pilgrimage (2026)
