= Top of the Pops@Play =

- Logo used between 2000-01
- Based on: Top of the Pops
- Country of origin: United Kingdom
- Original language: English

Original release
- Network: Play UK
- Release: September 4, 2000 – September 28, 2001

Related
- Top of the Pops; TOTP2; Top of the Pops Reloaded

Top of the Pops@play (TOTP@play), is a music television programme, that was broadcast on UKTV-owned digital youth entertainment television channel, Play UK. The programme ran daily on weekday afternoons for over a year from 4 September 2000 until 28 September 2001 and replaced The Phone Zone, a spin off of The O Zone which also ended in 2000.

It was a spin-off of the long-running BBC music programme, Top of the Pops, and was one of several Play UK programmes to utilise the TOTP brand. These programmes were able to use the BBC-owned TOTP brand commercially as BBC Worldwide, the BBC's commercial arm, held (and still holds) a 50% stake in the UKTV group of channels. BBC Worldwide also publishes the TOTP magazine.

The programme was broadcast for three hours each weekday afternoon as a live music and entertainment magazine programme, featuring interviews with celebrities, interactive phone-in elements (such as music video requests), competitions, and magazine features. It was similar in style to the rival programme MTV Select, which aired in a similar afternoon timeslot on MTV UK & Ireland.

TOTP@play utilised a number of presenters during its run, including Josie d'Arby, Vernon Kay, Joe Mace and Dermot O'Leary.
