= Stanley Appel =

British television producer and director (1933–2023)

Stanley Appel (9 June 1933 – 15 May 2023) was a British television producer and director of light entertainment at BBC Television, most synonymous with his overhaul of Top of the Pops in the early 1990s, which saw the brief end to BBC Radio 1 DJs hosting the show.

== Life and career ==
Stanley Appel was born in Stepney, London on 9 June 1933.

Prior to joining light entertainment he was a senior television studio cameraman for many years. Appel became best known for his work on light entertainment at the BBC, most notably his reworking of Top of the Pops during the 1990s. He was also the producer of the popular game show, Blankety Blank, during the Les Dawson era. Appel also produced the Marti Caine series, Leo Sayer series, Paul Daniels series, Lulu series, and the Mike Yarwood series.

Appel was married to Marina, and had two daughters; Renée and Bianca. He died on 15 May 2023, at the age of 89.
