= Family Forensics UK =

Family Forensics is a British reality television series produced by Twofour for the channel LivingTV. Only one episode was created for broadcast before the series was cancelled. This episode was aired on 16 November 2005 and was subsequently televised again in April and May 2006. Family Forensics UK, hosted by Jayne Middlemiss, was the UK version of the US show Family Forensics. The show featured a forensics team that included a forensic profiler, a private investigator, and a relationships expert. The team entered the life of a real family and treated the household as if it were a crime scene, profiling the lives and psychological make-up of the family members over the course of a weekend.

== Premise ==
The forensics team had access to the family's entire house and its contents for a weekend. The team looked through personal belongings, computer files, photos, financial records, and household rubbish. One of the family members assisted the producers by providing the cast members access to their home. The family member "in the know" ensured that the family would be out of the house long enough for the investigation to proceed by telling the other family members that they had won a vacation. The team took swabs, fingerprints, and other samples to piece together a picture of the entire family and presented the family with detailed personal profiles based on their findings. The UK supplier of crime scene equipment known as Tetra Scene of Crime was contracted as a consultant and managed all aspects of the forensic investigation. Phillip Ravell, also known as "Forensic Phil", used various cutting edge crime scene detection techniques to show the viewers actual investigation methods used by CSI members.

== Production ==
The episodes were produced by the Twentieth Century Fox Television, totalling six hours of airtime prior to the show's first broadcast in July 2005. The show was Middlemiss' first presenting job since she had won Celebrity Love Island in 2005. Christine Webber was the relationship expert, and a retired policeman was also an adviser on the show. Charlotte Wheeler was the executive producer and Sue McGregor was the director of the show.

== Cancellation ==
In November 2005, after the first episode had been broadcast, the show was abruptly cancelled when the producers discovered that their private investigator, Michael Brown, had been convicted of six child sex offenses that October. Brown was in breach of his contract by failing to inform producers about the conviction. Living TV apologized for broadcasting the single episode and lost £600,000 in pulling the series. Brown also had previous convictions for another child sex offense, and for the possession of a knuckleduster. He was jailed in December 2005. The show was then re-filmed with a new team and broadcast in April and May 2006.

== Reception ==
The Times stated, "If Kim and Aggie role-played as CSI agents, the result would be something like this nosy (and previously axed) series." The Telegraph called it, "A super, slightly nasty idea."
