= Steve Wright in the Afternoon =

British radio show

- Other names: The Big Show
- Genre: Chat, music and comedy
- Running time: 3 hours (2:00 pm – 5:00 pm)
- Country of origin: United Kingdom
- Language: English
- Home station: BBC Radio 2
- Hosted by: Steve Wright
- Starring: Tim Smith (1999–2022); Janey Lee Grace (1999–2022); Sally Boazman (1999–2014); Bobbie Pryor (2014–2022)
- Recording studio: Broadcasting House (1999–2006); Wogan House (2006–2022)
- Original release: 5 July 1999 – 30 September 2022
- Audio format: Stereo
- Podcast: Steve Wright in the Afternoon - The Big Podcast

Steve Wright in the Afternoon is the name given to the English disc-jockey Steve Wright's radio shows. Wright's afternoon programme was known by that name from 1989.

Wright first presented the afternoon show on BBC Radio 1 regularly from 30 March 1981 to 24 December 1993, and then the breakfast show, named Steve Wright in the Morning, from 10 January 1994 to 21 April 1995. He presented the BBC Radio 2 afternoon show from 5 July 1999 to 30 September 2022.

The Radio 2 version, broadcast from 14:00 to 17:00 on weekdays, was frequently referred to on-air as The Big Show.

== Format (Radio 2) ==
The programme began at 14:00 after the news with the show's main theme. Unlike most shows, it was well established as being a "brand", with its own unique style of presentation, although Wright regularly used the standard BBC Radio 2 jingles along with jingles unique to the show, written and performed by AJ Music Productions. Guests regularly appeared on the show, often to plug a new television show or film.

From 1999 to 2008 the programme had a feature slot called Website of the Week, where Miles Mendoza would present the latest novel website he had discovered.

== History ==
=== Radio 1 ===
Steve Wright in the Afternoon
- Genre: Comedy, chat and music
- Running time: 2½ hours (1981–92); 3 hours (1992–93)
- Country of origin: United Kingdom
- Language: English
- Home station: BBC Radio 1
- Hosted by: Steve Wright
- Original release: 30 March 1981 – 24 December 1993

Steve Wright in the Afternoon began on BBC Radio 1 in 1981, and ran until December 1993.

Wright started at Radio 1 in January 1980, presenting a number of different shows and filling in for other presenters. He gained a regular weekday afternoon programme on 30 March 1981.

The programme's start time and length changed in the early years, before moving to its regular 15:00–17:30 slot on 30 September 1985. The show's length was extended on 9 March 1992 by 30 minutes, giving it an airtime of 15:00 to 18:00.

Originally it was simply listed as Steve Wright in the Radio Times; it was first billed as Steve Wright in the Afternoon on 4 December 1989.

The programme ended on 24 December 1993, as Wright and his 'posse' moved to the breakfast show, presenting Steve Wright in the Morning from 10 January 1994, until being replaced by Chris Evans in April 1995, at which time Wright left the BBC.

=== Radio 2 ===
After leaving BBC Radio 1, Wright worked at Talk Radio, and at GWR, presenting a networked weekend show. He returned to the BBC – at Radio 2 – in 1996. He started as a weekend presenter, hosting a Saturday morning show and Steve Wright's Sunday Love Songs on Sunday mornings. Steve Wright in the Afternoon was revived in 1999 following a programme shake-up at Radio 2. Wright presented the show every Monday to Friday from 14:00 to 17:00. The show built up a huge following and was given its own podcast in 2006 as part of a trial period. This was still available every week with highlights from the show.

The Big Show followed the zoo format, with Steve Wright as the host, and co-presenters Tim Smith and Janey Lee Grace, as well as input from the news and travel presenters on the day. There was also a character called 'The Old Woman'; who regularly appeared on the show. Listeners did not know her identity, but many rumours circulated on the internet as to who she was. On 9 November 2016, Wright confirmed the death of Joyce Frost from Dagenham, aka 'The Old Woman', thereby revealing her true identity. Other spoof characters included 'Barry from Watford', an octogenarian lifestyle coach played by the actor Alex Lowe), and 'Elvis', performed by Mitch Benn, who from around 2005 until 2014 appeared in the feature Ask Elvis.

==== Cancellation ====
On 1 July 2022, Wright announced on air that the show would end in September 2022, as Radio 2 boss Helen Thomas "wanted to do something different in the afternoons". The final show was broadcast on 30 September 2022. Steve Wright's Sunday Love Songs continued on the station until Wright's death in February 2024. Scott Mills replaced Wright in the weekday afternoon slot on 31 October 2022.
