= Tim Smith (DJ) =

English broadcaster and radio personality

Tim Smith (born 1961 in Swindon) is a British broadcaster and radio personality who is a presenter for digital station Magic Classical. He was a co-presenter on Steve Wright in the Afternoon on BBC Radio 2 from 1999 until 2022.

== Broadcasting career ==
Smith started out on university radio whilst studying in York. From 1984 he worked for several stations including BBC Radio York and BBC Radio Shropshire. On 1 April 1989, after a short stint with BBC WM, he joined BBC Radio 1 to present a new weekend early show to coincide with the station starting its day at the earlier time of 5 a.m.

He presented Top of the Pops on one occasion, alongside Anthea Turner. He succeeded Paul Burnett as the host of the BBC World Service Top 20 as part of its "Multitrack" programmes heard in the late 1980s and early 1990s. During the 1990s he presented on BBC Radio London, hosting the Picture Show, which was nominated for a Sony Award. He also presented the breakfast show on Magic 105.8 and Jazz FM.

He joined BBC Radio 2 in 1999 as a co-presenter on Steve Wright in the Afternoon, as part of the team with Janey Lee Grace and the "old woman" Joyce Frost. During his time on the show, he interviewed a number of celebrities and, alongside Wright, co-interviewed the Prime Minister, Tony Blair. He was known on the show for reading out lists of trivial information known as "factoids". He also presented his own show on BBC Radio Oxford on Saturday mornings until April 2019. Smith left Radio 2 when the Afternoon show ended in September 2022.

In 2018, he presented an episode of Celebrity Antiques Road Trip on BBC Two with Janey Lee Grace.

In April 2023, Smith returned to radio with Jazz FM, presenting bank holiday programmes.

From June 2025, Smith now presents the weekday morning slot on Magic Classical.

== Other work ==
Smith is a keen golfer, and regularly presents a podcast on the sport with BBC journalist Rob Nothman and comedian Patrick Kielty. He has co-presented online coverage of the Wimbledon Championships and the 2000 Open Golf Championship in St Andrews.

He has provided podcasts for UK companies including Jaguar Land Rover, Diageo, Network Rail, BT, UK Power Networks and McVitie's.
