= Play UK =

Television channel by UKTV

- Logo used from 2000 to 2002

Ownership
- Owner: UKTV (BBC Worldwide/Flextech)
- Sister channels: UK Gold; UK Drama (known as UK Arena until 2000); UK Style; UK Gold 2 (known as UK Gold Classics until 1999); UK Horizons; UK Food

History
- Launched: 10 October 1998; 27 years ago
- Closed: 30 September 2002; 23 years ago
- Replaced by: UK History
- Former names: UK Play (October 1998–November 2000)

Play UK was a music and comedy television channel broadcasting in the United Kingdom as part of the UKTV network of channels. Play UK broadcast 24/7 on digital platforms, but on the Sky Analogue platform on the Astra 19.2°E satellite system, it broadcast during UK Horizons's overnight downtime of 1 am and 7 am, when UK Horizons was not broadcasting.

== History ==
The channel had originally been planned as part of the BBC's plans with Flextech to launch a series of BBC-branded channels and was conceived as a television version of BBC Radio 1 but conflicts over advertising on BBC-branded channels saw the UKTV partnership transitioned over to BBC Worldwide and the channel launched as UK Play on 10 October 1998, and without any formal ties to Radio 1. It changed its name to Play UK on 27 November 2000. Like the now‑defunct 4Music and Viacom's old Freeview channel Viva, the channel had music programming through the day, while broadcasting comedy during its primetime and evening hours. Most of the comedy programming on Play UK had already been broadcast on the BBC's terrestrial channels, with Play UK adding a few original UKTV-produced comedy programmes as well as a number of American comedy and animation shows towards the end of its broadcast life.

=== Closure ===
On 30 June 2002, it was announced that Play UK would shut down at the end of the year, with the closure of ITV Digital being the reason for its demise. The channel closed on 30 September 2002 at 12 am, with its EPG space later being used to launch UK History the following month as part of the launch of Freeview.

Some of the channel's comedy programming like The Office, The Fast Show and Shooting Stars were moved to UK Gold following the closure. Other programs were later added to UKG2 upon its launch the following year in November 2003.

== Former programmes ==
=== Music programming ===
The majority of the music programmes broadcast (quizzes, interviews and compilations) on Play UK were produced by UKTV. Play UK also used to air repeats of TOTP2, which were originally broadcast on BBC Two.

- Joe's Pop Shop
- Mark and Lard's Pop Upstairs Downstairs
- Mental! - The Music Quiz (with Iain Lee)
- Pop Will Shoot Itself
- Rock Profile (this comedy–music show, lasting from 1999–2002, featured Matt Lucas and David Walliams spoofing various pop bands)
- The Joy of Decks
- The Phone Zone (music request programme using The O Zone branding)
- The Sound of Disco
- The Sound of Play
- The UK Top 20
- TOTP@play

=== Original UKTV-produced shows ===
- The Alphabet Show
- Boy George: One on One
- Cherry Pop
- The Chris Moyles Show
- Either/Or (1999–2002)
- futurTV
- Honky Sausages
- The Mitchell and Webb Situation (7 April 2001–2002; 2004)
- RE:Brand
- Swivel on the Tip
- Terrorville (2000–2001)
- Unnovations
- Vic Reeves Examines

=== American programmes ===
- Duckman (1999–2001)
- The Larry Sanders Show (2000–2002)

=== Reruns from the BBC archives ===
- 500 Bus Stops (1998–2002)
- Attention Scum (2001–2002)
- Bang, Bang, It's Reeves and Mortimer (2001)
- Big Train (1999–2001)
- Coogan's Run (1999–2001)
- The Day Today (1999–2002)
- Dr. Terrible's House of Horrible (2002)
- The Fast Show (1998–2002)
- Game On (1998–2001)
- Goodness Gracious Me (1998–2002)
- Harry Enfield's Television Programme (2001–2002)
- Hippies (2000–2002)
- Human Remains (2001–2002)
- I'm Alan Partridge (1999–2002)
- Introducing Tony Ferrino - Who? And Why? - A Quest (1999–2002)
- Knowing Me, Knowing You with Alan Partridge (1998–2002)
- LA 7 (2001–2002)
- The League of Gentlemen (2000–2002)
- Marion and Geoff (2001–2002)
- Miami 7 (2000–2001)
- The Office (2001–2002)
- Operation Good Guys (2000–2002)
- 'Orrible (2002)
- Pauline Calf's Wedding Video (2001–2002)
- People Like Us (2000–2002)
- The Royle Family (2000–2002)
- Shooting Stars (1998–2002)
- Sir Bernard's Stately Homes (2000–2002)
- Smashie and Nicey: End of an Era (2000–2002)
- The Smell of Reeves and Mortimer (2001)
- Stella Street (1999–2002)
- Stressed Eric (2001–2002)
- The Tony Ferrino Phenomenon (1999–2002)
- Two Pints of Lager and a Packet of Crisps (2001–2002)
- World of Pub (2002)
