= Top of the Pops =

British music chart TV series

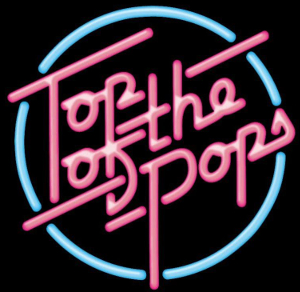
- Logo used 1973–1986 and 2019–2021
- Created by: Johnnie Stewart and Stanley Dorfman
- Directed by: Stanley Dorfman (1964–1970); Johnnie Stewart (1964–1969); Mel Cornish (1969–1970); Robin Nash (1973–1980)
- Presented by: Clara Amfo (2017–present); (see full list of past presenters)
- Country of origin: United Kingdom
- No. of episodes: 2,275 (508 missing)

Production
- Executive producers: Johnnie Stewart (1964–1969); Stanley Dorfman (1969–1973); Robin Nash (1973–1980); Michael Hurll (1980–1988); Paul Ciani (1988–1991); Stanley Appel (1991–1994); Ric Blaxill (1994–1997); Chris Cowey (1997–2003); Andi Peters (2003–2005); Mark Cooper (2005–2018); Alison Howe (2019–2021)
- Producers: Stanley Dorfman (1964–1970); Johnnie Stewart (1964–1969); Mel Cornish (1969–1973); Robin Nash (1973–1980); Neville Wortman; Colin Charman; Brian Whitehouse; Phil Bishop; Mark Wells; Jeff Simpson; Michael Kelpie (Series Producer 2000–2002); Barrie Kelly; Dominic Smith; Sally Wood; Stephanie McWhinnie; Caroline Cullen
- Running time: 25–60 minutes
- Production company: BBC Studios Music Productions

Original release
- Network: BBC One (weekly)
- Release: 1 January 1964 – 8 July 2005
- Network: BBC One (Christmas and New Year specials)
- Release: 24 December 1964 – 31 December 2021
- Network: BBC Two (weekly)
- Release: 17 July 2005 – 30 July 2006
- Network: BBC Two (Christmas review)
- Release: 24 December 2022 – present

Related
- TOTP2; Top Gear of the Pops; Top of the Pops Reloaded; TOTP@play; TopPop

Top of the Pops (TOTP) is a British record chart television programme, made by the BBC and broadcast weekly between 1 January 1964 and 30 July 2006. The programme was the world's longest-running weekly music show. For most of its history, it was broadcast on Thursday evenings on BBC One. Each show consisted of performances of some of the week's best-selling popular music records, usually excluding any tracks moving down the chart, including a rundown of that week's singles chart. This was originally the Top 20, though this varied throughout the show's history. The Top 30 was used from 1969 and the Top 40 from 1984.

Dusty Springfield's "I Only Want to Be with You" was the first song featured on TOTP, while the Rolling Stones were the first band to perform with "I Wanna Be Your Man". Snow Patrol were the last act to play live on the weekly show when they performed their single "Chasing Cars". Status Quo made more appearances than any other artist, with a total of 106 (the first was with "Pictures of Matchstick Men" in 1968 and last with "The Party Ain't Over Yet" in 2005).

Special editions were broadcast on Christmas Day (and usually, until 1984, a second edition a few days after Christmas), featuring some of the best-selling singles of the year and the Christmas number one. Although the weekly show was cancelled in 2006, the Christmas special continued annually. End-of-year round-up editions have also been broadcast on BBC1 on or around New Year's Eve, albeit largely featuring the same acts and tracks as the Christmas Day shows. In a change of format, the festive specials have not returned since 2022 and were replaced by an end-of-year review show on BBC Two. It also survives as Top of the Pops 2, which began in 1994 and features vintage performances from the Top of the Pops archives. Though TOTP2 ceased producing new episodes from 2017, repeats of older episodes are still shown.

The Official Charts Company states that "performing on the show was considered an honour, and it pulled in just about every major player". The show has seen seminal performances over its history. The March 1971 appearance of T. Rex frontman Marc Bolan wearing glitter and satins as he performed "Hot Love" is often seen as the inception of glam rock, and David Bowie's performance of "Starman" inspired future musicians. In the 1990s, the show's format was sold to several foreign broadcasters in the form of a franchise package, and at one point various versions of the show were shown in more than 120 countries. Editions of the programme from 1976 onwards started being repeated on BBC Four in 2011 and are aired on most Friday evenings – as of 2026, the repeat run has reached 2000. Episodes featuring disgraced presenters and artists such as Jimmy Savile, Dave Lee Travis, Scott Mills, Ian Watkins, Jonathan King, Rolf Harris, Gary Glitter, R. Kelly and Sean "Diddy" Combs are no longer repeated.

== History ==
An audience watching a performance at a recording of Top of the Pops

Bill Cotton devised the name Top of the Pops. Cotton, Johnnie Stewart and Stanley Dorfman devised the rules which governed how the show would operate: the programme would always end with the number one record, which was the only record that could appear in consecutive weeks. The show would include the highest new entry, and (if not featured in the previous week) the highest climber on the charts, and omit any song going down in the chart. Tracks could be featured in consecutive weeks in different formats. For example, if a song was played over the chart countdown or the closing credits, then it was acceptable for the act to appear in the studio the following week.

These rules were sometimes interpreted flexibly. It was originally based on the Top 20. By the 1970s, the Top 30 was being used and the show was extended from thirty to forty-five minutes duration and songs that were featured outside the charts were chosen according to Dorfman and his fellow producer's Melvyn Cornish's personal taste and judgement. The rules were more formally relaxed from 1997 when records descending the charts were featured more regularly, possibly as a response to the changing nature of the Top 40; in the late 1990s and early 2000s climbers in the charts were a rarity, with almost all singles peaking at their debut position.

When the programme's format changed in November 2003, it concentrated increasingly on the top 10. Later, during the BBC Two era, the top 20 was regarded as the main cut-off point, with the exception made for up and coming bands below the top 20. Singles from below the top 40 (within the top 75) were shown if the band were up and coming or had a strong selling album. If a single being performed was below the top 40, just the words "New Entry" were shown and not the chart position.

The show was originally intended to run for only a few programmes but lasted over 42 years, reaching landmark episodes of 500, 1,000, 1,500 and 2,000 in the years 1973, 1983, 1992 and 2002 respectively.

=== First edition ===
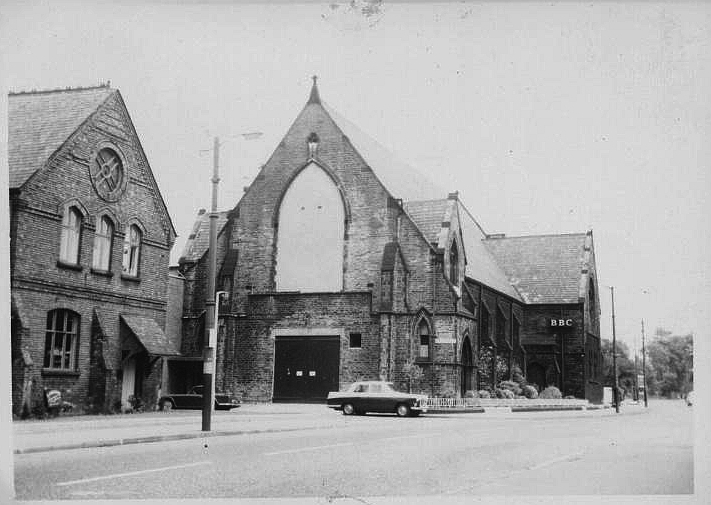
Top of the Pops was first broadcast from Dickenson Road Studios in Manchester.

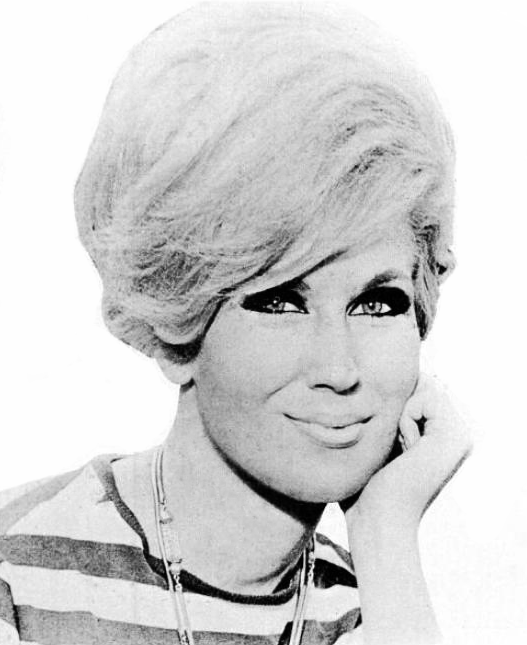
Dusty Springfield was the first act to be featured on the show.

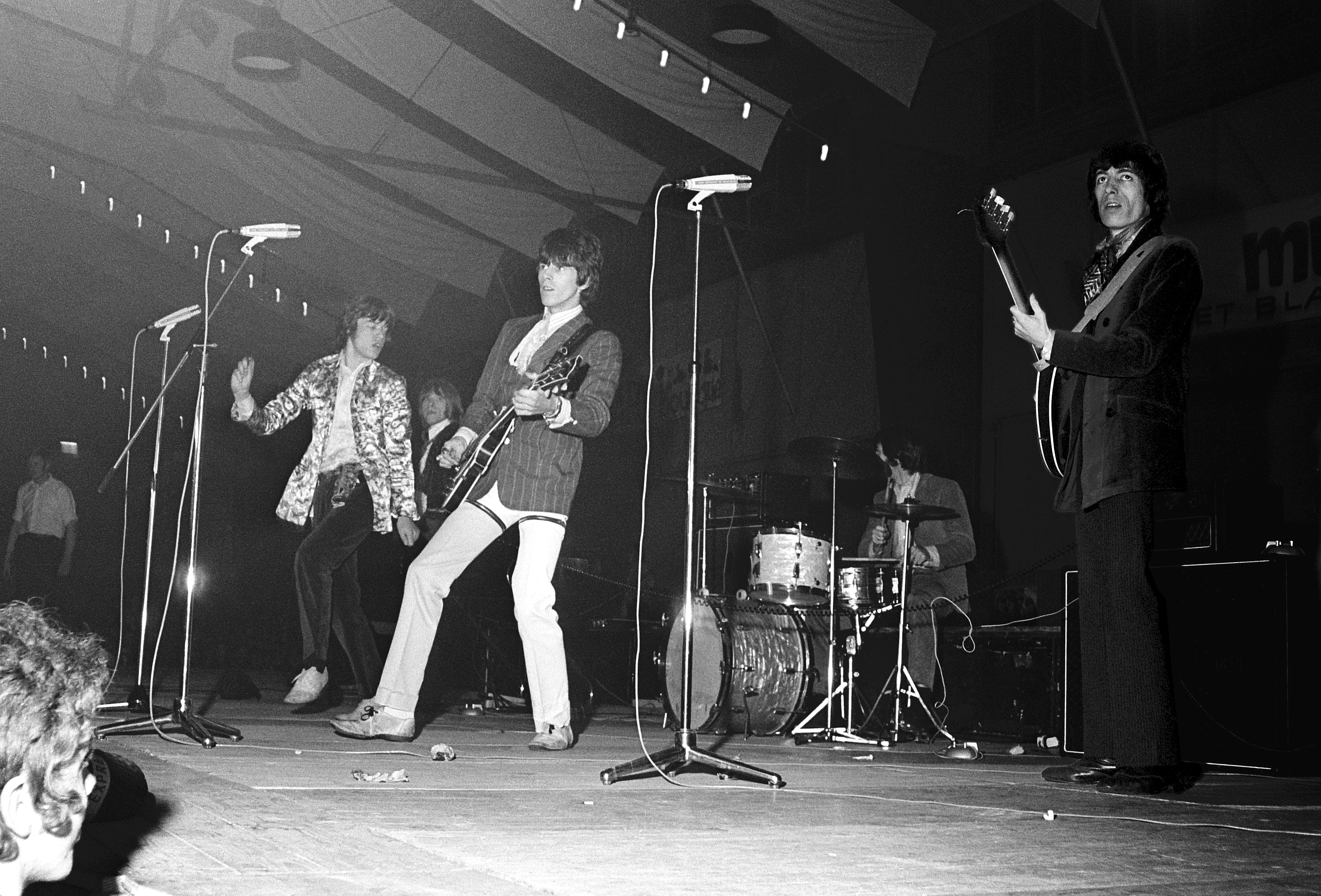
The Rolling Stones were the first group to appear on the show (group pictured in concert in The Hague in 1967).

The first edition of Top of the Pops was broadcast on Wednesday, 1 January 1964 at 6:35 pm. It was produced in Studio A at Dickenson Road Studios in Rusholme, Manchester.

The first show was presented by Jimmy Savile, with a brief link to Alan Freeman in London to preview the following week's programme. The producer Johnnie Stewart based the show's format on Savile's Teen and Twenty Disc Club on Radio Luxembourg. The first show featured (in order) Dusty Springfield with "I Only Want to Be with You", the Rolling Stones with "I Wanna Be Your Man", the Dave Clark Five with "Glad All Over", the Hollies with "Stay", the Swinging Blue Jeans with "Hippy Hippy Shake" and the Beatles with "I Want to Hold Your Hand", that week's number one. Throughout its history, the programme proper always (with very few exceptions) finished with the best-selling single of the week, although there often was a separate play-out track over the end credits.

=== 1960s and 1970s ===
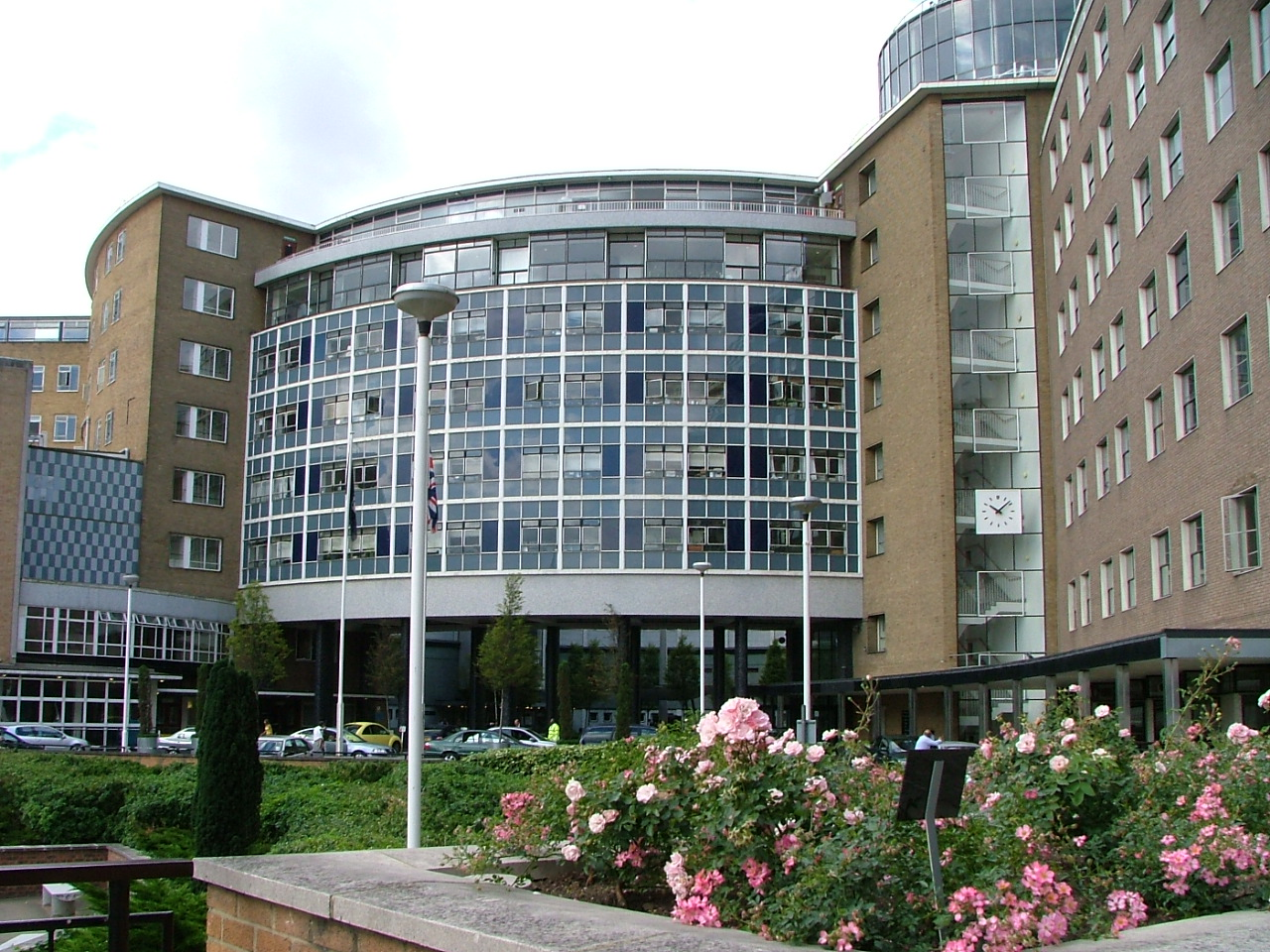
BBC Television Centre in London, home of Top of the Pops 1969–1991 and 2001–2006

Top of the Pops TV studios
Date	Studio
1964–1965	Dickenson Road Studios
1966–1969	Lime Grove Studios
1969–1991	BBC Television Centre
1991–2001	BBC Elstree Centre
2001–2006	BBC Television Centre

In September 1964, the broadcast time was moved to one hour later, at 7:35 pm, and the show moved from Wednesdays to what became its regular Thursday slot. Additionally its length was extended by 5 minutes to 30 minutes.

For the first three years Alan Freeman, David Jacobs, Pete Murray and Jimmy Savile rotated presenting duties, with the following week's presenter also appearing at the end of each show, although this practice ceased from October 1964 onwards.

The show was taped 52 weeks a year with no breaks. The chart came out on Tuesday mornings and the show aired live on Thursday evenings. This led to a process of difficult weekly planning, rescheduling, booking, and rebooking, as well as pre-recording of acts, particularly of American artists who might be advancing up the chart the following weeks, to ensure that each weeks top 20 would be able to appear on the show. At the BBC in the 1960s and early 1970s, producers and directors did both jobs simultaneously. From 1964 to 1969, Stewart and Dorfman took it in turns to produce and direct, but each spent five days a week getting the show together. At the end of 1969, Stewart left, and was replaced in early 1970 by Melvyn Cornish, Stewart returned as an executive producer in 1971 until 1973. Dorfman directed and produced the series from 1964 until 1971, then continued for five years thereafter as an executive producer.

In the first few editions, Denise Sampey was the "disc girl", who would be seen to put the record on a turntable before the next act played their track. However, a Mancunian model, Samantha Juste, became the regular disc girl after a few episodes, a role she performed until 1967.

Initially acts performing on the show would mime (lip-sync) to the commercially released record, but in 1966 after discussions with the Musicians' Union, miming was banned. After a few weeks during which some bands' attempts to play as well as on their records were somewhat lacking, a compromise was reached whereby a specially recorded backing track was permitted, as long as all the musicians on the track were present in the studio. As a result, Stewart hired Johnny Pearson to conduct an in-studio orchestra to provide musical backing on select performances, beginning with the 4 August 1966 edition. Later, vocal group The Ladybirds began providing vocal backing with the orchestra.

With the birth of BBC Radio 1 in 1967, new Radio 1 DJs were added to the roster – Stuart Henry, Emperor Rosko, Simon Dee and Kenny Everett.

Local photographer Harry Goodwin was hired to provide shots of non-appearing artists, and also to provide backdrops for the chart run-down. He continued in the role until about 1973.

After two years at the Manchester Dickenson Road Studios, the show moved to London (considered to be better located for bands to appear), initially for six months at BBC Television Centre Studio 2 and then to the larger Studio G at BBC Lime Grove Studios in mid-1966 to provide space for the Top of the Pops Orchestra, which was introduced at this time to provide live instrumentation on some performances (previously, acts had generally mimed to the records). In November 1969, with the introduction of colour, the show moved to BBC Television Centre, where it stayed until 1991, when it moved to Elstree Studios Studio C.

For a while in the early 1970s, non-chart songs were played on a more regular basis. To reflect the perceived growing importance of album sales, there was an album slot featuring three songs from a new LP, as well as a New Release spot and a feature of a new act, dubbed Tip for the Top. These features were dropped after a while, although the programme continued to feature new releases on a regular basis for the rest of the decade.

During its heyday, it attracted 15 million viewers each week. The peak TV audience of 19 million was recorded in 1979, during the ITV strike, with only BBC1 and BBC2 on air.

=== Christmas Top of the Pops ===
A year-end Christmas show which used a "The Year in Review" format, was inaugurated on 24 December 1964 and has continued every year since. From 1965 until 2021, the special edition was broadcast on Christmas Day (although not in 1966) and from the same year, a second edition was broadcast in the days after Christmas, varying depending on the schedule, but initially regularly on 26 December. The first was shown on 26 December 1965. From 1967, the Christmas Day edition was broadcast earlier in the afternoon (typically around 2:15pm). In 2022, the Christmas show was moved to BBC Two and broadcast on 24 December, with no usual studio-based live performances included in the broadcast. In 1973, there was just one show, airing on Christmas Day. In place of the traditional second show, Jimmy Savile hosted a look back at the first 10 years of TOTP, broadcast on 27 December. In 1975, the first of the two shows was broadcast prior to Christmas Day, airing on 23 December, followed by the traditional Christmas Day show two days later.

The 1978 Christmas Day show was disrupted due to industrial action at the BBC, requiring a change in format to the broadcast. The first show, due to be screened on 21 December, was not shown at all because BBC1 was off the air. For Christmas Day, Noel Edmonds (presenting his last ever edition of TOTP) hosted the show from the 'TOTP Production Office' with clips taken from various editions of the show broadcast during the year and new studio footage performed without an audience. The format was slightly tweaked for the Christmas Day edition in 1981, with the Radio 1 DJs choosing their favourite tracks of the year and the following edition on 31 December featuring the year's number 1 hits. The second programme was discontinued after 1984.

=== 1980s ===
The year 1980 marked major production changes to Top of the Pops and a hiatus forced by industrial action. Steve Wright made his presenting debut on 7 February 1980. Towards the end of February 1980, facing a £40 million budget deficit, the BBC laid off five orchestras as part of £130 million in cuts. The budget cuts led to a Musicians' Union strike that suspended operations of all 11 BBC orchestras and performances of live music on the BBC; Top of the Pops went out of production between 29 May and 7 August 1980. During the Musicians' Union strike, BBC1 showed repeats of Are You Being Served? in the regular Top of the Pops Thursday night time slot.

Following the strike, Nash was replaced as executive producer by Michael Hurll, who introduced more of a "party" atmosphere to the show, with performances often accompanied by balloons and cheerleaders, and more audible audience noise and cheering. Hurll also laid off the orchestra, as the Musicians' Union was loosening enforcement of the 1966 miming ban.

Guest co-presenters and a music news feature were introduced for a short while, but had ceased by the end of 1980. The chart rundown was split into three sections in the middle of the programme, with the final Top 10 section initially featuring clips of the songs' videos, although this became rarer over the next few years.

An occasional feature showing the American music scene with Jonathan King was introduced in November 1981, and ran every few weeks until February 1985. In January 1985, a Breakers section, featuring short video clips of new tracks in the lower end of the Top 40, was introduced, and this continued for most weeks until March 1994.

Although the programme had been broadcast live in its early editions, it had been recorded on the day before transmission for many years. However, from May 1981, the show was sometimes broadcast live for a few editions each year, and this practice continued on an occasional basis (often in the week of a bank holiday, when the release of the new chart was delayed, and for some special editions) for the rest of the decade.

The programme moved in September 1985 to a new regular half-hour timeslot of 7 pm on Thursdays, following wider reforms to BBC TV scheduling by then-controller Michael Grade. With the exception of special editions, this saw the end of its longer episodes, which had ranged between 35 and 45 minutes in previous years. Coupled with an emphasis on video clips via features such as the aforementioned Breakers section, fewer studio acts could appear due to this, leading to renewed general criticism from both viewers and performers, and occasionally putting the show at a slight disadvantage to other music television programmes (alongside later dedicated channels for music videos) such as The Tube and the revived Whistle Test (though both would end in 1987).

The end of 1988 was marked by a special 70-minute edition of the show broadcast on 31 December 1988, to celebrate the 25th anniversary of the first show. The pre-recorded programme featured the return of the original four presenters (Savile, Freeman, Murray and Jacobs) as well as numerous presenters from the show's history, anchored by Paul Gambaccini and Mike Read. Numerous clips from the history of the show were included in between acts performing in the studio, which included Cliff Richard, Engelbert Humperdinck, Lulu, the Four Tops, David Essex, Mud, Status Quo, Shakin' Stevens, the Tremeloes and from the very first edition, the Swinging Blue Jeans. Sandie Shaw, the Pet Shop Boys and Wet Wet Wet were billed in the Radio Times to appear, but none featured in the show other than Shaw in compilation clips.

Paul Ciani took over as producer in 1988. The following year, in an attempt to fit more songs in the allocated half-hour again, he restricted the duration of studio performances to three minutes, and videos to two minutes, a practice which was largely continued until May 1997. In July 1990, he introduced a rundown of the Top 5 albums, which continued on a monthly basis until May 1991. Ciani had to step down due to illness in 1991, when Hurll returned as producer to cover for two months (and again for a brief time as holiday cover in 1992).

=== 1991: 'Year Zero' revamp ===
From 1967, the show had become closely associated with the BBC radio station Radio 1, usually being presented by DJs from the station, and between 1988 and 1991 the programme was simulcast on the radio station in FM stereo (that is, until BBC's launch of NICAM stereo for TV made such simulcasts redundant). However, during the last few years of the 1980s the association became less close, and was severed completely (although not permanently) in a radical shake-up known as the 'Year Zero' revamp.

Following a fall in viewing figures and a general perception that the show had become 'uncool' (acts like the Clash had refused to appear in the show in previous years), incoming executive producer Stanley Appel (who had worked on the programme since 1966 as cameraman, production assistant, director and stand-in producer) introduced a radical new format on 3 October 1991, in which the Radio 1 DJs were replaced by a team of relative unknowns, such as Claudia Simon and Tony Dortie who had previously worked for Children's BBC, 17-year-old local radio DJ Mark Franklin, Steve Anderson, Adrian Rose and Elayne Smith, who was replaced by Femi Oke in 1992. A brand new theme tune ("Now Get Out of That"), title sequence and logo were introduced, and the entire programme moved from BBC Television Centre in London to BBC Elstree Centre in Borehamwood.

The new presenting team would take turns hosting (initially usually in pairs but sometimes solo), and would often introduce acts in an out-of-vision voiceover over the song's instrumental introduction. Short informal interviews were also conducted on stage with the performers, and initially the Top 10 countdown was run without any voiceover. Rules relating to performance were altered, meaning acts had to forcibly sing live as opposed to the backing tracks for instruments and mimed vocals for which the show was known. To incorporate a shift towards USA artists, more use was made of out-of-studio performances, with acts in America able to transmit their song to the Top of the Pops audience "via satellite". These changes were widely unpopular and much of the presenting team were axed within a year, leaving the show hosted solely by Dortie and Franklin (apart from the Christmas Day editions, when both presenters appeared) from October 1992, on a week-by-week rotation.

=== 1994–1997 ===
By 1994, much of the 'Year Zero' revamp was quickly undone and the arrival of Ric Blaxill as producer in February 1994 signalled a return to presentation from established Radio 1 DJs Simon Mayo, Mark Goodier, Nicky Campbell and Bruno Brookes. Blaxill expanded the use of "via satellite" performances, taking the acts out of studios and concert halls and setting them against landmark backdrops. As a consequence, Bon Jovi performed Always from Niagara Falls and Celine Dion beamed in Think Twice from Miami Beach.

Blaxill also increasingly experimented with handing presenting duties to celebrities, commonly contemporary comedians and pop stars who were not in the charts at that time. In an attempt to keep the links between acts as fresh as the performances themselves, the so-called "golden mic" was used by, amongst others, Kylie Minogue, Meat Loaf, Chris Eubank, Fred Dibnah, Damon Albarn, Harry Hill, Jack Dee, Lulu, Björk, Jarvis Cocker, Stewart Lee and Richard Herring. Radio 1 DJs still presented occasionally, including Lisa I'Anson, Steve Lamacq, Jo Whiley and on one show only Chris Evans. The last remnants of the Year Zero revamp were replaced on 2 February 1995, when a new set, title sequence, logo and theme tune were introduced (the logo having first appeared on the new programme Top of the Pops 2, which had debuted five months previously in mid-September 1994).

TOTP was traditionally shown on a Thursday night, but was moved to a Friday starting on 14 June 1996, originally at 7 pm, but then shifted to 7.30 pm, a change which placed the programme up against the soap opera Coronation Street on ITV. This began a major decline in audience figures as fans were forced to choose between Top of the Pops and an episode of the soap. 26 July 1996 saw the first episode of TOTP to air on BBC2, due to the Olympics airing on BBC1.

=== 1997–2003 ===
In 1997, incoming producer Chris Cowey phased out the use of celebrities and established a rotating team of former presenters from youth music magazine The O-Zone including Jayne Middlemiss and Jamie Theakston, as well as existing Radio 1 DJs Jo Whiley and Zoe Ball. The team was later augmented by Kate Thornton and Gail Porter.

Cowey additionally instigated a wider set of 'back to basics' changes when he took over the show. On 1 May 1998, a remixed version of the classic "Whole Lotta Love" theme tune previously used in the 1970s was introduced, accompanied by a new 1960s-inspired logo and title sequence. Cowey also began to export the brand overseas with localised versions of the show on air in Germany, France, the Netherlands, Belgium and Italy by 2003. Finally, the programme returned to its previous home of BBC Television Centre in 2001, where it remained until its cancellation in 2006.

=== 2003: All New Top of the Pops ===
On 28 November 2003 (three months after the appointment of Andi Peters as executive producer), the show saw one of its most radical overhauls since the ill-fated 1991 'Year Zero' revamp in what was widely reported as a make-or-break attempt to revitalise the long-running series. In a break with the previous format, the show played more up-and-coming tracks ahead of any chart success, and also featured interviews with artists and a music news feature called "24/7". Most editions of the show were now broadcast live, for the first time since 1991 (apart from a couple of editions in 1994).

Although the first edition premièred to improved ratings, the All New format, hosted by MTV presenter Tim Kash, quickly returned to low ratings and brought about scathing reviews. Kash continued to host the show, but Radio 1 DJs Reggie Yates and Fearne Cotton (who had each presented a few shows in 2003, before the revamp) were brought back to co-host alongside him, before Kash was completely dropped by the BBC, later taking up a new contract at MTV. The show continued to be hosted by Reggie Yates and Fearne Cotton (usually together, but occasionally solo) on Friday evenings until 8 July 2005.

On 30 July 2004, the show took place outside a studio environment for the first time by broadcasting outside in Gateshead. Girls Aloud, Busted, Will Young and Jamelia were among the performers that night.

=== 2005 ===
Figures had plummeted to below three million, prompting an announcement by the BBC that the show was going to move, again, to Sunday evenings on BBC Two, thus losing the prime-time slot on BBC One that it had maintained for more than forty years. The show had aired on BBC Two occasionally from 1996, usually if it was Comic Relief or Children in Need on BBC One.

This move was widely reported as a final "sidelining" of the show, and perhaps signalled its likely cancellation. At the time, it was insisted that this was so the show would air immediately after the official announcement of the new top 40 chart on Radio 1, as it was thought that by the following Friday, the chart seemed out of date. The final Top of the Pops to be shown on BBC One (barring Christmas and New Year specials) was broadcast on Monday 11 July 2005, which was edition number 2,166.

The first regular edition on BBC Two was broadcast on 17 July 2005 at 7.00 pm with presenter Fearne Cotton. Following the move to Sundays, Cotton continued to host with a different guest presenter each week, such as Rufus Hound or Richard Bacon. On a number of occasions, however, Reggie Yates would step in, joined by female guest presenters such as Lulu, Cyndi Lauper and Anastacia. Viewing figures during this period averaged around 1 1/2 million. Shortly after the move to BBC Two, Peters resigned as executive producer. He was replaced by the BBC's Creative Head of Music Entertainment Mark Cooper, while producer Sally Wood remained to oversee the show on a weekly basis.

=== 2006 ===
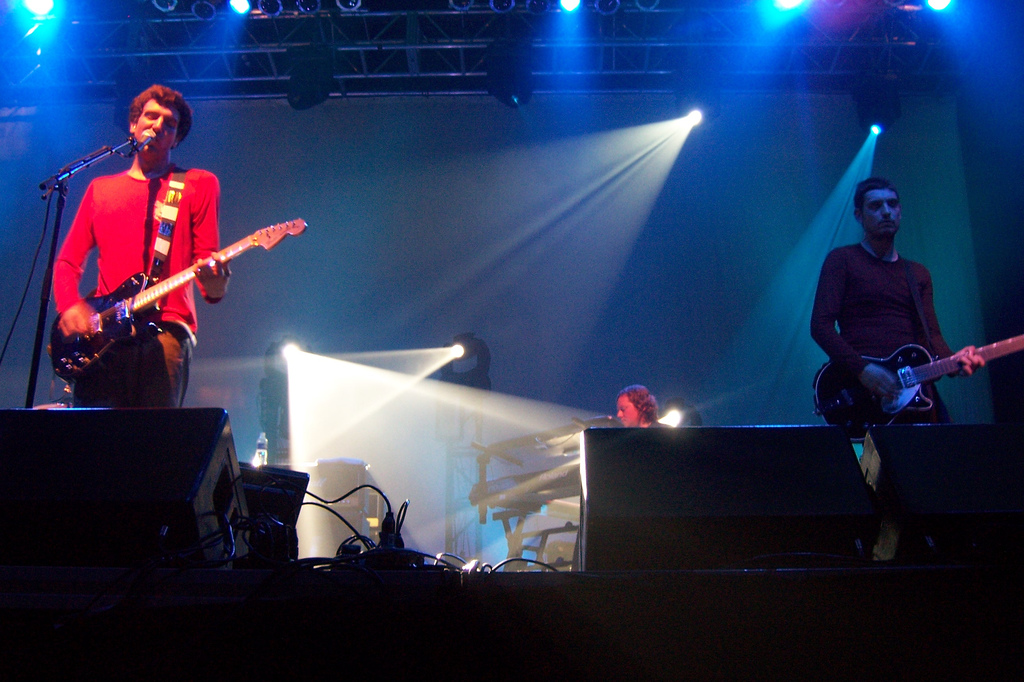
Snow Patrol, the last live act to appear on TOTP (pictured in concert in America in 2006)

On 20 June 2006, the show was formally cancelled and it was announced that the last edition would be broadcast on 30 July 2006. Edith Bowman co-presented its hour-long swansong, along with Jimmy Savile (who was the main presenter on the first show), Reggie Yates, Mike Read, Pat Sharp, Sarah Cawood, Dave Lee Travis, Rufus Hound, Tony Blackburn and Janice Long.

The final day of recording was 26 July 2006 and featured archive footage and tributes, including the Rolling Stones – the very first band to appear on Top of the Pops – opening with "The Last Time" (Savile explained in the programme that their first appearance on the show performing "I Wanna Be Your Man" had been wiped by the BBC), the Spice Girls, David Bowie, Wham!, Madonna, Beyoncé, Gnarls Barkley, the Jackson 5, Sonny & Cher and Robbie Williams. The show closed with a final countdown, topped by Shakira, as her track "Hips Don't Lie" (featuring Wyclef Jean) had climbed back up to number one on the UK Singles Chart earlier in the day. The show ended with Savile ultimately turning the lights off in the empty studio.

Fearne Cotton, who was the current presenter, was unavailable to co-host for the final edition due to her filming of ITV's Love Island in Fiji but opened the show with a quick introduction recorded on location, saying "It's still number one, it's Top of the Pops". BARB reported the final show's viewing figures as 3.98 million.

As the last episode featured no live acts in the studio, the last act to actually play live on a weekly episode of TOTP was Snow Patrol, who performed "Chasing Cars" in the penultimate edition (the final song in that episode was actually McFly's cover of "Don't Stop Me Now" (the number one single that week), but this was a repeat from the previous week); the last act ever featured visually on a weekly Top of the Pops was Girls Aloud, as part of the closing sequence of bands performing on the show throughout the years. They were shown performing "Love Machine".

=== 2006–2023 ===
The magazine and TOTP2 both survived despite the show's axing, and the Christmas editions continue as of 2024. However, the TOTP website is now no longer updated.

==== Proposed return ====
In October 2008, British Culture Secretary Andy Burnham and Manchester indie band the Ting Tings called for the show to return.

On 29 October 2008, Simon Cowell stated in an interview that he would be willing to buy the rights to Top of the Pops from the BBC. The corporation responded that they had not been formally approached by Cowell, and that in any case the format was "not up for sale". In November 2008, it was reported by The Times and other newspapers that the weekly programme was to be revived in 2009, but the BBC said there were no such plans.

In July 2009, Pet Shop Boys singer Neil Tennant criticised the BBC for ending the programme, stating that new acts were missing out on "that great moment of being crowned that week's Kings of Pop".

In early 2015 there was increased speculation of a return of the show including rumours that Dermot O'Leary might present alongside Fearne Cotton. According to a report in the Daily Mirror, a BBC insider stated that "some at the highest level are massive supporters of the plan [of a return] and have given the go-ahead." The move of the UK charts to a Friday due to take place in summer 2015 was also said to favour the possibility of a return, making it "the perfect tie-in" and a "perfect start to the weekend", but no weekly return has occurred.

==== BBC Four repeats ====
In April 2011, the BBC began to reshow Top of the Pops on Thursday nights on BBC Four beginning with the equivalent show from 35 years earlier in a 7:30 pm–8:00 pm slot approximating to the time the programme was traditionally shown. The first programme shown, 1 April 1976, was chosen because it was from approximately this episode onwards that most editions remain in the BBC archive. The repeat programmes come in two versions; the first is edited down to fit in the 30-minute 7:30 slot, the second is shown normally twice overnight in the following weekend, and is usually complete. However both the short and longer editions can be edited for a number of reasons.

Content that might offend modern audiences is cut, and cinematic film footage can be truncated, replaced or removed entirely due to the costs to the BBC of reshowing such footage. The BBC also makes the repeats available on BBC iPlayer. The repeats are continuing as of 2026 with episodes from 2000, and from 28 October 2022, older episodes from 1976 to 1992 are broadcast at 8pm.

However since October 2012, episodes featuring Jimmy Savile have ceased to be broadcast due to the sexual abuse scandal and subsequent Operation Yewtree police investigation. Following the arrest of Dave Lee Travis by Operation Yewtree officers, and his subsequent conviction for indecent assault, episodes featuring Travis were also omitted. Following Gary Glitter's conviction for sexual assault in 2015, episodes featuring him are also not included in the run, or otherwise have Glitter's performances edited out. Episodes featuring R. Kelly are also skipped, or have his performances edited out, following his convictions for sexual abuse. John Alford's appearance on the show, originally broadcast on 23 May 1996, has also not been repeated since he was charged in July 2024, and again in September 2025, with sexual offences. Episodes featuring Diddy (then known as Puff Daddy) are also skipped from the run, or have had his performances edited out, following allegations of his sexual misconduct. Following Scott Mills' dismissal from the BBC, episodes hosted by him are also omitted.

Mike Smith decided not to sign the licence extension that would allow the BBC to repeat the Top of the Pops episodes that he presented, with the BBC continuing to respect his wishes following his death. Adrian Rose also chose not to allow his episodes to be repeated. As a result, episodes featuring Smith and Rose are also omitted.

==== "Story of" Specials ====
Prior to the 1976 BBC reruns shown in 2011, the BBC produced a special programme, "The Story of 1976". This comprised excerpts from the 1976 programmes, interspersed with new interviews with people discussing the time period.

They produced similar programmes for subsequent calendar years, each airing before or during the run of repeats from the particular year. These specials went on hiatus following "The Story of 1990" in October 2020, but returned in early 2022 as a weekly series, scheduled from "The Story of 1991" up to "The Story of 1999" in May 2022.

==== "Big Hits" compilation ====
A series of "Big Hits" compilations have been broadcast with on-screen captions about artists.In December 2016, a festive special using the format of the "Big Hits" programmes, Top of the Pops: Christmas Hits was broadcast on BBC Four, featuring a mix of Christmas music and non-festive songs which had been hits at Christmas time. This effectively replaced the annual Christmas edition of Top of the Pops 2, which did not run that year.

==== Christmas and New Year specials ====
Although the weekly Top of the Pops has been cancelled, the Christmas Specials have continued, initially hosted by Fearne Cotton and Reggie Yates. The Christmas specials were broadcast on Christmas Day afternoon on BBC One. From 2008 to 2021 (apart from 2010 and 2011), a New Year special has also been broadcast. A new logo and title sequence were introduced on the 2019 Christmas special. The BBC's Head of Music Television, Mark Cooper, continued to oversee the programme as executive producer until 2019 when he was replaced by Alison Howe. Meanwhile, Stephanie McWhinnie, who had replaced Wood as producer with effect from Christmas 2011, was replaced by Caroline Cullen (who had previously worked as assistant producer on the show) from Christmas 2020, when both festive shows were recorded with new studio performances but no live audience physically in attendance. On 4 December 2017, Yates stepped down from hosting Top of the Pops due to comments he made regarding Jewish people and rappers. The BBC later announced Clara Amfo as Yates' replacement, she continues to hold the role. Amfo was joined by Jordan North for the 2021 specials, with him replacing Cotton.

Following a change in format for 2022, the usual studio-based festive editions with new live performances did not return and was replaced by an end-of-year programme, Top of the Pops Review of the Year 2022, was aired on Christmas Eve on BBC Two with Amfo returning as host alongside fellow Radio 1 DJ Jack Saunders. This format returned in 2023, with Amfo hosting the reviews of the respective year. Amfo also hosted the reviews of 2024 and 2025.

==== Comic Relief specials ====
The show was given a one-off revival (of sorts) for Comic Relief 2007 in the form of Top Gear of the Pops, presented by Jeremy Clarkson, Richard Hammond and James May. It was filmed at the Top Gear aerodrome studio in Surrey on Sunday, 11 March 2007, although it bore little resemblance to the usual Top of the Pops format.

On 13 March 2009, Top of The Pops was once again revived, this time in its usual format, for a special live Comic Relief edition, airing on BBC Two while the main telethon took a break for the BBC News at Ten on BBC One. As with the Christmas specials the show was presented by Radio 1 duo Fearne Cotton and Reggie Yates with special guest presenter Noel Fielding and appearances from Dawn French, Jennifer Saunders, Claudia Winkleman, Jonathan Ross, Davina McCall (dancing in the audience and later as a Flo Rida dancer with Claudia Winkleman and French and Saunders) and David Tennant.

Live performances – interspersed with Comic Relief appeal films – included acts such as Franz Ferdinand, Oasis, Take That, U2, James Morrison and Flo Rida (that week's Number 1). Kicking off the show was a performance from Rob Brydon and Ruth Jones in their Gavin & Stacey guises, feat. Tom Jones and Robin Gibb with "(Barry) Islands in the Stream", the Comic Relief single.

== Performers, performances and presenters ==
Most frequent performers on Top of the Pops

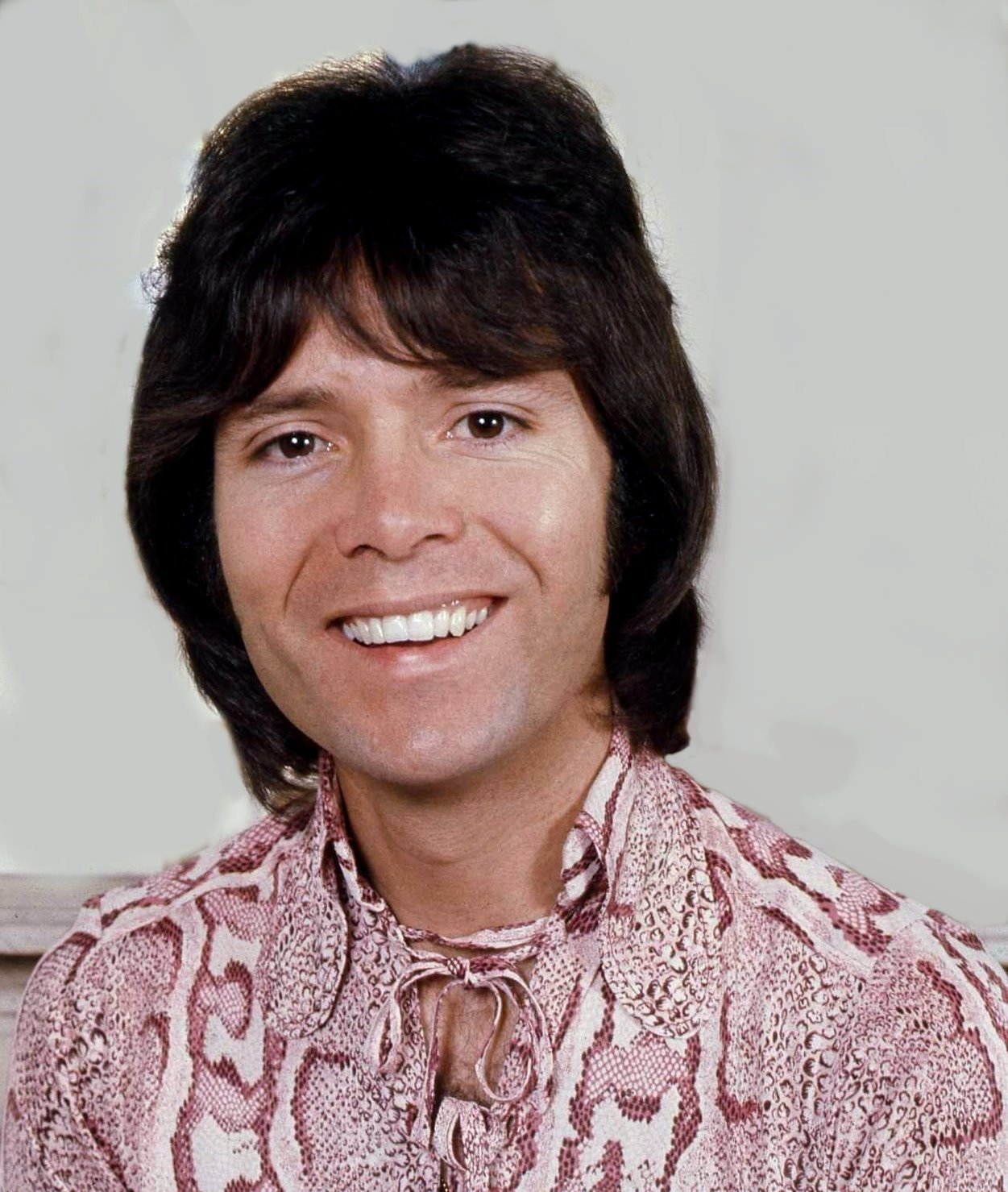
Solo artist: Cliff Richard

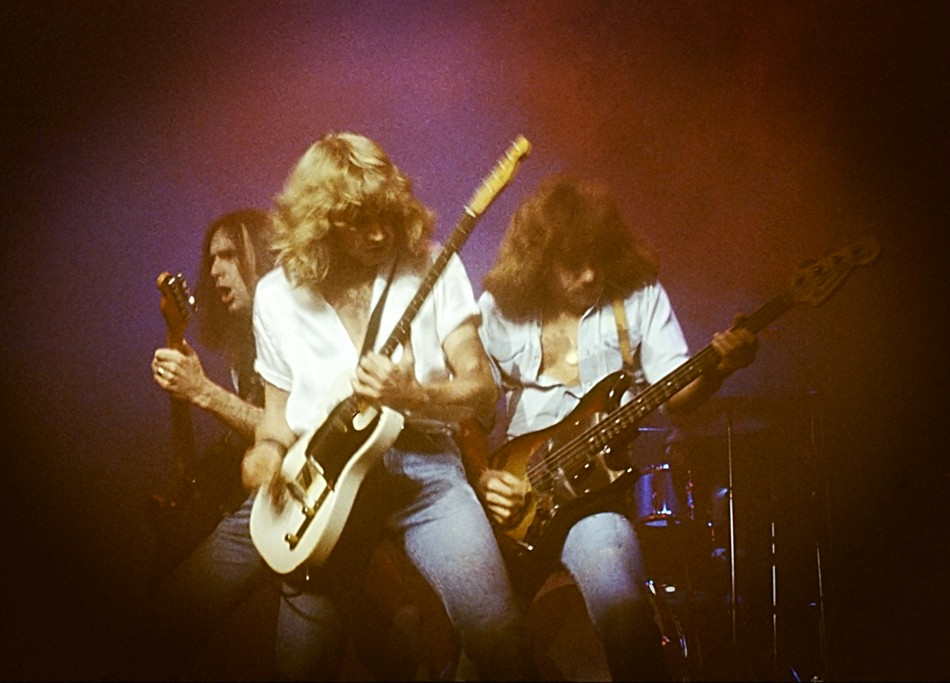
Group: Status Quo

In its extensive history, Top of the Pops has featured many artists, many of whom have appeared more than once on the show to promote many of their records.

Green Day hold the record for the longest Top of the Pops performance: "Jesus of Suburbia" broadcast on 6 November 2005, lasted 9 minutes and 10 seconds. There is uncertainty about what was the shortest performance. In 2005, presenter Reggie Yates announced on the show that it was Super Furry Animals with "Do or Die", broadcast on 28 January 2000, clocking in at 95 seconds. However, "It's My Turn" by Angelic was 91 seconds on 16 June 2000 and "Here Comes the Summer" by the Undertones was just 84 seconds on 26 July 1979.

Cliff Richard appeared the most times on the show, with almost 160 performances. Status Quo were the most frequent group with 106 performances.

=== Miming ===
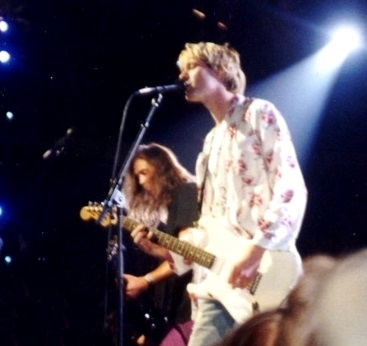
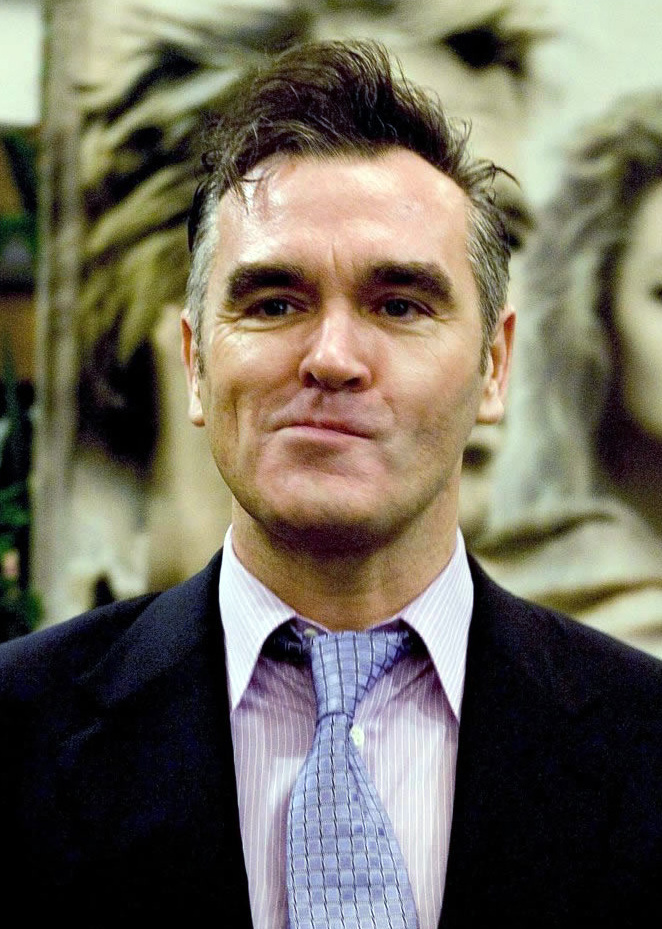
In 1991, American rock band Nirvana (left, pictured the year after) infamously performed their 1991 hit single "Smells Like Teen Spirit", lead singer Kurt Cobain sang in a low voice, changing some of the lyrics; Cobain later stated that he wanted to sound like Morrissey (right, pictured in 2005).

Throughout the show's history, many artists mimed to backing tracks. Early on, Musicians' Union rules required that groups re-record backing tracks with union members performing when possible. However, as The Guardian recounted in 2001: "In practice, artists pretended to re-record the song, then used their original tapes."

The miming policy also led to the occasional technical hitch. In an August 1967 edition, as Jimi Hendrix prepared to perform "Burning of the Midnight Lamp", the song "The House That Jack Built" by the Alan Price Set was played in studio instead, reportedly prompting Hendrix to respond: "I don't know the words to that one, man". In August 1988, All About Eve appeared to perform "Martha's Harbour" on a live edition. Although the song was being played on the television broadcast, it was not being played in studio, so lead singer Julianne Regan remained silent on a stool on stage while Tim Bricheno (the only other band member present) did not play his guitar.

Occasionally bands played live, examples in the 1970s and 1980s being the Four Seasons, the Who, Blondie, John Otway, Sham 69, Eddie and the Hot Rods, Jimmy James and the Vagabonds, The Sweet, The Jackson 5, Heavy Metal Kids, Elton John, Typically Tropical, New Order, Whitney Houston and David Bowie. In 1980, heavy metal band Iron Maiden played live on the show when they refused to mime to their single "Running Free". Solo artists and vocal groups were supposed to sing live to the Top of the Pops Orchestra. Billy Ocean, Brotherhood of Man, Anita Ward, Thelma Houston, Deniece Williams, Hylda Baker, Boney M. and the Nolans all performed in this way.

Miming resulted in a number of notable moments. In 1977, The Stranglers mimed to "No More Heroes" – after the start of the song, bass player Jean Jacques Burnel waves a newspaper to try and clear the smoke created from the smoke machines prior to the performance and, later, during his guitar solo Hugh Cornwell removes his hand from the guitar neck for a few seconds. In 1991, Nirvana refused to mime to the pre-recorded backing track of "Smells Like Teen Spirit" with Kurt Cobain singing in a deliberately low voice and altering lyrics in the song, and bassist Krist Novoselic swinging his bass over his head and drummer Dave Grohl playing randomly on his kit. In 1995, the Gallagher brothers of Oasis switched places while performing "Roll with It". During their performance of "Don't Leave Me This Way" the Communards singers Jimmy Somerville and Sarah Jane Morris swapped lyrics for part of the song towards the end. Another example of whimsy was John Peel's appearance as the mandolin soloist for Rod Stewart on "Maggie May".

The producers of the show allowed artists the option of singing live over a backing track in 1991. The new practice also exposed a number of poor live singers. In its final few years miming had become less and less common, especially for bands, as studio technology became more reliable and artists were given the freedom to choose their performance style. Former Executive Producer Andi Peters said there was no policy on miming and that it was entirely up to the performer whether they wanted to sing live or mime.

=== Orchestra and backing singers ===
From 1966 to 1980, Top of the Pops had an in-studio orchestra conducted by Johnny Pearson accompany select musical performances, with The Ladybirds (later Maggie Stredder Singers) providing backing vocals. Credited on the show as musical associate, Derek Warne played piano and provided musical arrangements for the orchestra. As The Telegraph recounted, Pearson and the orchestra improvised accompaniments with about 20 minutes of rehearsal time per song, and the musicians, "almost all middle-aged, often struggled with the enormous range of rock and pop tunes with which they were presented." In contrast, The Times said upon Pearson's passing in 2011 that the orchestra "often elicit[ed] excellent performances with barely enough time beforehand for a couple of run-throughs."

Other notable members of the orchestra include drummer Clem Cattini, trombonist Bobby Lamb, and lead trumpeters Leon Calvert and Ian Hamer. From 1971 to 1974, Martin Briley played guitar for the orchestra before joining rock group Greenslade.

Following the 1980 Musicians Union strike, the programme resumed broadcast on 7 August 1980 without its orchestra or backing singers. However, Pearson continued to make occasional contributions as musical director until the 900th episode in the summer of 1981. Afterwards, Warne occasionally made musical arrangements through April 1982. Ronnie Hazlehurst conducted the orchestra from 1982 to 1983.

=== Promotional films and music videos ===
In the 1960s and 1970s, the weekly record chart was published every Tuesday morning, and the live show was broadcast on Thursday evenings. This created a need for regular studio appearances by the top artists who often had hectic touring schedules that made it difficult for them to be present. As a result, the show's production team faced a complex weekly planning process, involving rescheduling, booking, and rebooking of acts. To ensure that the show featured the top 20 artists of each week, particularly those from America who were expected to rise in the chart, pre-recording of performances became necessary.

When an artist or group was unavailable to perform in studio, Top of the Pops would show a music video, pre-recorded videos known as 'promotional films' at that time, in the acts' place. By the time the Beatles stopped touring in late 1966, their promotional films had become highly sophisticated. In May 1966 they filmed two sets of colour promotional clips for their current single "Rain" (also known as "Paperback Writer") to air on Top of the Pops on 2 June. According to Queen guitarist Brian May, the groundbreaking 1975 music video for "Bohemian Rhapsody" was produced so that the band could avoid miming on Top of the Pops since they would have looked off miming to such a complex song. This established the importance of promotional film clips as a means of promoting both emerging acts and new releases by established acts, which contributed to advent of the music video genre.

== Dance troupes ==
=== January to October 1964 – no dance troupes ===
In the era before promotional videos were routinely produced for every charting single, the BBC would frequently have neither the band themselves nor alternative footage available for a song selected for the programme. In the first few months of the show in 1964, the director would just scan across the audience dancing in the absence of any other footage, but by October 1964 a decision was made to at least occasionally bring in a dance troupe with a choreographed routine to some of the tracks.

=== November 1964 to April 1968 – The Go-Jos ===
An initial candidate troupe was the existing BBC TV Beat Girls, but an ex-dancer from the Beat Girls, Jo Cook, was eventually engaged to create a troupe, the all-female Go-Jos, with Cook as choreographer. The Go-Jos also worked outside of Top of the Pops, notably for two years on the Val Doonican show – Doonican said in 1968 "I thought the Gojos were fabulous, something really new. When I got my own television series I just had to have them with me."

They were initially a three-piece (Pat Hughes for the first edition only, Linda Hotchkin and Jane Bartlett), but their number eventually grew to six (Hotchkin, Bartlett, Lesley Larbey, Wendy Hilhouse, Barbara van der Heyde and Thelma Bignell) with Cook as full-time choreographer. Lulu remembered of their costumes "They mostly wore white boots to the knee and short skirts and the camera would go up the skirt and it was all very risqué."

Cook herself said of working on the Doonican show (of which she was dance director) comparing to Top of the Pops, "Pop steps are limited ... With Val we have more scope, and we can work to get more of the feel of ballet into our numbers."

=== May to June 1968 – Go-Jos/Pan's People transition ===
In April 1968, a Top of the Pops choreographer, Virginia Mason, auditioned for dancers for a routine on Top of The Pops ("Simon Says" by the 1910 Fruitgum Company); two of whom that were successful (Ruth Pearson and Patricia "Dee Dee" Wilde) were part of the existing six-female dance troupe, Pan's People. Like the Go-Jos, this group was also partly drawn from ex-members of the Beat Girls.

Although this routine did not make it onto the programme itself, in subsequent weeks, members of Pan's People (Louise Clarke, Felicity "Flick" Colby, Barbara "Babs" Lord, Pearson, Andrea "Andi" Rutherford and Wilde) started to appear on the programme separately to the Go-Jos. Pan's People were then selected by the BBC over the Go-Jos when they chose a group to be the resident troupe. The Go-Jos' final Top of the Pops performance was in June 1968 dancing to "Jumpin' Jack Flash" by the Rolling Stones.

=== July 1968 to April 1976 – Pan's People ===
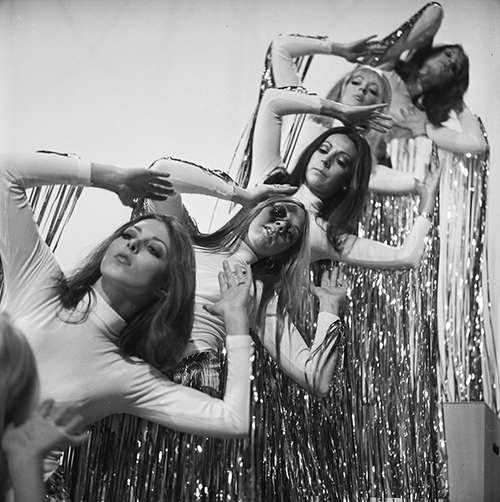
Dance troupe Pan's People (pictured here on TopPop, AVRO 1971)

As with the Go-Jos, in the first eighteen months of the Pan's People era the dancers were not a weekly fixture on the programme. However, due to group fan mail and good viewing figures, by 1970 the group was on nearly every week. Pay was not high – they were paid the minimum Equity rate of £56 per week.

One of the original Pan's People dancers, Colby, became the full-time choreographer in 1971. Colby spoke of the dancing – "They weren't Broadway-standard routines ... we were definitely doing watercolours, not oil paintings."

=== May to October 1976 – Ruby Flipper ===
In early 1976, the last remaining of the early members of Pan's People, Ruth Pearson announced her retirement, leaving just four members all of whom who had joined within the last four years; Cherry Gillespie, Mary Corpe, Lee Ward and Sue Menhenick. Rather than continue with this line up or add additional members, it was decided by Colby and BBC production staff to replace this group with a male and female group created for the programme, Ruby Flipper, choreographed by Colby and managed by Colby with Pearson. Lee Ward left shortly after this decision was made, reportedly saying regarding the change: "It's a big mistake. Men rush home to watch sexy ladies. They do not want to see other men."

Rehearsals for this new group started in March 1976, and the group began appearing on Top of the Pops in May 1976. Whilst producers were aware of the switch to the new group, Bill Cotton, the then head of the light entertainment unit of which Top of the Pops was part, was not. This group started as a seven-piece with three men (Gavin Trace, Floyd Pearce and Phil Steggles) and four women (Menhenick, Gillespie, Patti Hammond and Lulu Cartwright). Corpe was not invited to join the new troupe. Trace, Pearce, Steggles and Cartwright joined following open auditions, Hammond, an established dancer, was invited to join to complete the "look" following a later individual audition. Colby viewed this gender-mixed group as an opportunity to develop more physical routines including lifts, more duets and generally not have the whole group at each performance.

However, by August the BBC had decided to terminate the group due to perceived unpopularity and being "... out of step with viewers". Their final appearance was in October 1976.

=== November 1976 to November 1981 – Legs and Co ===
The group created to replace Ruby Flipper was Legs & Co., reverting to an all-female line-up, and once more choreographed by Colby. Three of the six in the initial line-up (Menhenick, Cartwight and Hammond) were taken from Ruby Flipper. with Rosie Hetherington, Gill Clarke and Pauline Peters making up the six. Despite its being an all-female group, on occasion one or more male dancers were brought in, including Pearce several times.

During their run, the group covered the transition from Disco to Punk, Electronic and Modern Romantic music.

=== December 1981 to September 1983 – Zoo ===
By late 1981, Legs & Co (by this time Anita Chellamah had replaced Peters) had become more integrated into the studio audience, rather than performing set-piece routines, as a result of the 'party atmosphere' brought in by Michael Hurll. Also by this time Colby was particularly keen to work once more with male dancers; feeling it time for a change, Legs & Co's stint was ended, and a twenty-member dance troupe (ten male, ten female), named Zoo was created, with a set of performers drawn from the pool of twenty each week. Colby was now credited as "Dance Director". Three members of previous troupes, Menhenick, Corpe and Chellamah, made at least one appearance each during the Zoo period. The dancers now chose their own clothes, moving away from the synchronised appearance of previous troupes.

=== October 1983 to 2006 – After Zoo ===
By the early 1980s, record companies were offering the BBC free promotional videos, meaning dance troupes no longer fulfilled their original purpose. Zoo's run ended in 1983, and with it the use of dance troupes on Top of the Pops.

Following the demise of Zoo, the audience took a more active role, often dancing in more prominent areas such as behind performing acts on the back of the stage, and on podiums. However, the show also employed cheerleaders to lead the dancing.

=== Dance Troupe chronology ===
- Go-Jos' first performance: 19 November 1964 – Dancing to "Baby Love" by the Supremes
- Pan's People first performance (three of the dancers, independently contracted): April 1968 – Dancing to "Young Girl" by Gary Puckett & The Union Gap or "Respect" by Aretha Franklin
- Pan's People's first performance (as the six-piece group of early 1968): 30 May 1968 – Dancing to "U.S. Male" by Elvis Presley
- Go-Jos' final performance: 27 June 1968 – Dancing to "Jumpin' Jack Flash" by the Rolling Stones
- Pan's People's final performance: 29 April 1976 – Dancing to "Silver Star" by the Four Seasons
- Ruby Flipper's first performance: 6 May 1976 – Dancing to "Can't Help Falling in Love" by the Stylistics
- Ruby Flipper's final performance: 14 October 1976 – Dancing to "Play That Funky Music" by Wild Cherry
- Legs & Co's first performance (credited as Ruby Flipper & Legs & Co): 21 October 1976 – Dancing to "Queen of My Soul" by Average White Band
- Legs & Co's first performance (credited as Legs & Co): 11 November 1976 – Dancing to "Spinning Rock Boogie" by Hank C. Burnette
- Legs & Co's final performance: 29 October 1981 – Dancing to "Favourite Shirts (Boy Meets Girl)" by Haircut One Hundred
- Zoo's first performance: 5 November 1981 – Dancing to "Twilight" by Electric Light Orchestra
- Zoo's final performance: 29 September 1983 – Dancing to "What I Got Is What You Need" by Unique

== Titles and theme music ==
The original Top of the Pops logo that appeared on-screen in 1964

The Top of the Pops logo used between 1998 and 2003

For much of the 1960s, the show's theme music was an organ-based instrumental track, also called "Top of the Pops", by the Dave Davani Four.

- 1 January 1964 to ?: Instrumental percussion piece written by Johnnie Stewart and Harry Rabinowitz and performed by drummer Bobby Midgly.
- 1965 to 1966: Dave Davani Four's "Top of the Pops" with the Ladybirds on backing vocal harmonies. Originally the opening theme, this was later played as a closing theme from 1966 up until 1970.
- 20 January 1966 to 13 November 1969: Unknown instrumental guitar track.
- 27 November 1969 to 29 October 1970: Unknown brass track played over colour titles with a voiceover proclaiming, "Yes! It's number one! It's Top of the Pops!" There was no TOTP on 20 November 1969 because of the Apollo 12 moon landing, with its timeslot being taken over by drama series The Doctors.
- 5 November 1970 to 14 July 1977: An instrumental version of the Led Zeppelin-Willie Dixon composition "Whole Lotta Love" performed by CCS members.
- 21 July 1977 to 29 May 1980: No opening theme tune; a contemporary chart song was played over the countdown stills. "Whole Lotta Love" (instrumental) featured only in Christmas editions (CCS version used in the 1979 Christmas shows), the 800th edition from 26 July 1979 and the voice-over only edition from 22 November 1979.
- 7 August 1980: Instrumental version of "Whole Lotta Love" used. Last used in 1977.
- 14 August 1980 to 2 July 1981: No opening theme tune; the CCS version of "Whole Lotta Love" was played over some of the images of the featured artists and during the countdown stills in the Top 30 and Top 20 sections which were moved later on in the programme. From the edition of 14 August 1980 to the edition of 2 July 1981, "Whole Lotta Love" was heard only during the chart rundowns.
- 9 July 1981 to 27 March 1986: "Yellow Pearl" was commissioned as the new theme music. A re-recording of "Yellow Pearl" was played over the chart rundown.
- 3 April 1986 to 26 September 1991: "The Wizard", a composition by Paul Hardcastle.
- 3 October 1991 to 26 January 1995: "Now Get Out of That" composed by Tony Gibber.
- 2 February 1995 to 8 August 1997 (except 27 June & 25 July 1997 and 15 August 1997 to 24 April 1998) and 10 October 1997: the theme was a track called "Red Hot Pop" composed by Vince Clarke of Erasure.
- 27 June and 25 July 1997 then 15 August 1997 to 24 April 1998 (except 10 October 1997): No theme tune; the opening of the first song of the episode was played under the titles and a song from the top 20 (that hadn't already featured on the show) was played under the chart rundown.
- 1 May 1998 to 21 November 2003: Updated, drum and bass version of "Whole Lotta Love" by Ben Chapman.
- 28 November 2003 to 30 July 2006 and until 2012 for TOTP2 and Christmas specials: A remixed version of "Now Get Out of That" by Tony Gibber.
- 25 December 2013 to 25 December 2021 for Top of the Pops Christmas and New Year Specials: A mix of both the 1970s "Whole Lotta Love" theme and the 1998 remix.

== Lost episodes ==
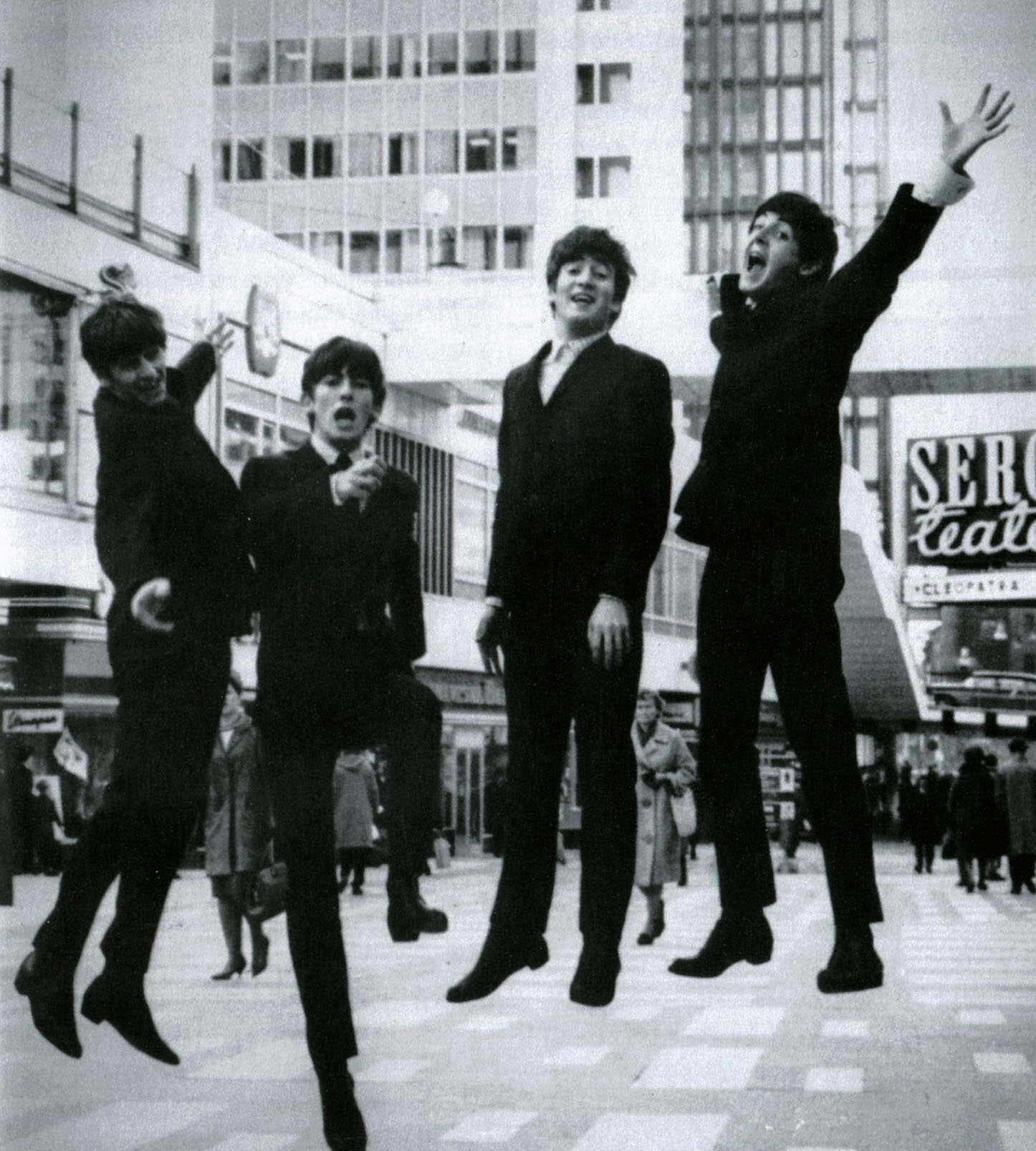
A recording of the only live performance by the Beatles on Top of the Pops in 1966 was not retained by the BBC (group pictured here in 1963).

Due to the then standard practice of wiping videotape, the vast majority of the episodes from the programme's history prior to 1976 are lost, including any official recording of the only live appearance by the Beatles.

Of the first 500 episodes (1964–1973), only about 20 complete recordings remain in the BBC archives, and the majority of these are from 1969 onwards. The earliest surviving footage dates from 26 February 1964, and consists of performances by Billy J. Kramer and the Dakotas and the Dave Clark Five. Some programmes exist only partially (largely performances that were either pre-recorded or re-used in later, surviving editions). There are also two examples of rehearsal footage, both from 1965; one which includes Alan Freeman introducing the Seekers, and another with Sandie Shaw rehearsing "Long Live Love"—both believed to be for the end-of-year Christmas Special. The oldest complete episode in existence was originally transmitted on Boxing Day in 1967 (only five complete recordings from the 1960s survive, two of which have mute presenter links). The most recent that is not held in any form is dated 8 September 1977. Most editions after this exist in full, though a number of episodes transmitted live during the 1980s were archived with slight technical issues (e.g. missing audio, typically restored by off-air recordings in repeats). One subsequent pre-recorded episode (dated 21 March 1985) from after is now believed to only exist as an off-air recording, and another later still from the 1990s (25 August 1994, hosted by Malcolm McLaren) appears to only exist in broadcast quality in raw, unedited master tape form similar to several earlier editions; both shows have been skipped in repeat airing runs.

The last thirteen minutes of the 19 August 1965 edition of TOTP survives, and features live performances from Herman's Hermits, Sonny & Cher, Jonathan King, and The Byrds.

Some off-air recordings, made by fans at home with a microphone in front of the TV speaker, exist in varying quality, including the Jimi Hendrix Experience performing a live version of "Hey Joe" in December 1966.

Some segments of TOTP which were not retained do survive in some form owing to having been included in other programmes, either by the BBC itself or by foreign broadcasters. What was thought to be the only surviving footage of the Beatles on the programme, for instance, comes from its re-use in episode one of 1965 Doctor Who serial The Chase. Additionally a number of recordings are believed to exist in private collections. However, in 2019, an 11-second clip of the group's only live appearance on TOTP, from 16 June 1966, was unearthed – this was recorded by a viewer using an 8mm camera to film the live transmission on their television. Other individual but complete clips that have surfaced over recent years include The Hollies performing "Bus Stop", and The Jimi Hendrix Experience playing both "Purple Haze" and "The Wind Cries Mary".

Thanks to a deal between the BBC and German television network ZDF around the turn of the 1970s, several TOTP clips were sent over to be shown on Disco, a similar-styled chart show. This meant that performances from the likes of The Kinks ("Apeman"), The Who ("The Seeker") and King Crimson ("Cat Food") still exist in German archives.

Two complete episodes from 1967 were discovered in a private collection in 2009, having been recorded at home on an early available open reel to reel video recorder. Whilst the tapes suffered from major damage and degradation of both sound and picture quality, one show featured Pink Floyd with original leader Syd Barrett performing "See Emily Play", whilst the second contained Dave Davies singing his solo hit "Death of a Clown".

The programme was forced off the air for several weeks by industrial action by the Musicians' Union in both 1974 and 1980.

== Spin-offs ==
Top of the Pops had a sister show called TOTP2 which used archive footage from as early as the late 1960s. It began on 17 September 1994. The early series were narrated by Johnnie Walker, before Steve Wright took over as narrator. In summer 2004 BBC Two's controller, Roly Keating, announced that it was being "rested". Shortly after UKTV G2 began showing re-edited versions of earlier programmes with re-recorded dialogue. Finally after a two-year break TOTP2 returned to the BBC Two schedules for a new series on Saturday, 30 September 2006, in an evening timeslot. It was still narrated by Steve Wright and featured a mixture of performances from the TOTP archive and newly recorded performances. The first edition of this series featured new performances by Razorlight and Nelly Furtado recorded after the final episode of Top of the Pops. In 2009 Mark Radcliffe took over as narrator. TOTP2 continued to receive sporadic new episodes from this point onwards, most notably Christmas specials, until 2017 when the show ceased producing new episodes, though previous episodes are still repeated on both BBC Two and BBC Four.

Aired on BBC Radio 1 between the mid-1990s and late 2001 was Top of the Pops: The Radio Show which went out every Sunday at 3 pm just before the singles chart, and was presented by Jayne Middlemiss and Scott Mills. It later reappeared on the BBC World Service in May 2003 originally presented by Emma B, where it continues to be broadcast weekly in an hourly format, now presented by Kim Robson and produced by former BBC World Service producer Alan Rowett.

The defunct channel Play UK created two spin offs; TOTP+ Plus and TOTP@Play (4 September 2000 – September 2001) (until mid-2000, this show was called The Phone Zone and was a spin-off from BBC Two music series The O-Zone). BBC Choice featured a show called TOTP The New Chart (5 December 1999 – 26 March 2000) and on BBC Two TOTP+ (8 October 2000 – 26 August 2001) which featured the TOTP @ Play studio and presenters. This is not to be confused with the UK Play version of the same name. A more recent spin-off (now ended) was Top of the Pops Saturday hosted originally by Fearne Cotton and Simon Grant, and its successor Top of the Pops Reloaded. This was shown on Saturday mornings on BBC One and featured competitions, star interviews, video reviews and some Top of the Pops performances. This was aimed at a younger audience and was part of the CBBC Saturday morning line-up. This was to rival CD:UK at the same time on ITV.

== Send-ups ==
A number of performers have sent up the format in various ways. This was often by performers who disliked the mime format of the show, as a protest against this rather than simply refusing to appear.

- When the Smiths appeared on the show to perform their single "This Charming Man", lead singer Morrissey was unhappy about having to lip-sync and so held a bunch of gladioli on the stage instead of a microphone.
- While performing their 1982 hit "Jackie Wilson Said (I'm in Heaven When You Smile)", the band Dexys Midnight Runners were seen performing in front of a projection of the darts player with a similar sounding name (Jocky Wilson instead of soul singer Jackie Wilson). Dexys' frontman Kevin Rowland later said in an interview that the use of the Jocky Wilson picture was his idea and not a mistake by the programme makers as is sometimes stated.
- Frankie Goes To Hollywood performed one of the many 1984 performances of their hit "Two Tribes" with bassist Mark O'Toole playing drums whilst drummer Ped Gill played bass.
- Singer Les Gray of Mud went on stage to perform with a ventriloquist dummy during the performance of "Lonely This Christmas" and had the dummy lip-synch to the voice-over in the middle of the song.
- EMF appeared on the show with one of the guitarists strumming along while wearing boxing gloves.
- In Blur's performance of "Charmless Man" in 1996, Dave Rowntree decided to play with oversized drumsticks, while Graham Coxon played a mini guitar.
- In Green Day's first Top of the Pops appearance in 1994, the band played the song "Welcome to Paradise". Frontman Billie Joe Armstrong wore an otherwise plain white T-shirt with the phrase "Who am I fooling anyway?" handwritten on it, most likely a reference to his own miming during the performance. He could also be seen not playing his guitar during the instrumental bridge in the song.
- The performance of "Maggie May" by Rod Stewart and the Faces featured John Peel miming on mandolin. Near the end of the song, Rod and the Faces begin to kick around a football. This is despite the fact that the music can be still heard playing in the background.
- Ambient house group the Orb sat and played chess while an edited version of their 39:57-minute single "Blue Room" played in the background.
- Depeche Mode's performance of "Barrel of a Gun" in 1997 featured Dutch photographer and director Anton Corbijn who mimed playing the drums. Also Tim Simenon (who produced the album the song appeared on) mimed playing keyboards along with Andy Fletcher.
- When the Cuban Boys performed "Cognoscenti vs. Intelligentsia" at the end of 1999, a performance which was reportedly unbroadcast, the band appeared wearing labcoats while covered in cobwebs.
- Madness often sent up the format of the show to the point that they were banned from Top of the Pops four times during the 80s. While it was mostly due to not miming properly, one notable example was when saxophonist Lee Thompson wore two shirts during their appearance for their single "Cardiac Arrest", with the first saying "I need the BBC...", and the second one saying "... like a hole in the f-cking head" to protest against the BBC. Another example was during their appearance for their single "The Sun and The Rain", when secondary vocalist and trumpet player Chas Smash displayed a sign to greet his brother Brendon who was imprisoned at the time. However, they kept appearing on the show as they continued to write hit singles.

== International versions ==
=== Europe ===
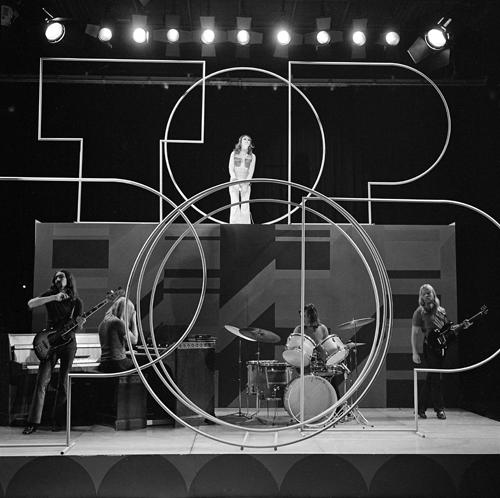
The Top of the Pops format was adopted by on several other European broadcasters, such as TopPop (Netherlands).

The TOTP format was sold to RTL in Germany in the 1990s, and aired on Saturday afternoons. It was very successful for a long time, with a compilation album series and magazine. However, in 2006 it was announced that the German show would be ending. The Italian version (first broadcast on Rai 2 and later on Italia 1) also ended in 2006. In February 2010 the show returned on Rai 2, and was broadcast for two seasons before being cancelled again in October 2011. The French version of the show ended by September 2006 on France 2. The short-lived Turkish version was aired on atv in 2000.

In the Netherlands, TopPop was broadcast by AVRO 1970–1988, and a version of the show continued to run on BNN until the end of December 2006. BBC Prime used to broadcast re-edited episodes of the BBC version, the weekend after it was transmitted in the UK. Ireland began transmitting Top of the Pops in November 1978 on RTÉ2. This was the UK version being transmitted at the same time as on BBC. The broadcasts ceased in late 1993.

=== United States ===
Top of the Pops had short-lived fame in the United States. In October 1987, the CBS television network decided to try an American version of the show. It was hosted by Nia Peeples and even showed performances from the BBC version of the programme (and vice versa). The show was presented on late Friday nights as part of CBS Late Night, and lasted almost half a year. It was originally slated to be a first-run syndicated series, but it was changed when Lionheart Television, the show's producers signed up with the network.

In 2002, BBC America presented the BBC version of Top of the Pops as part of their weekend schedule. The network would get the episodes one week after they were transmitted in the UK. BBC America then tinkered with the show by cutting a few minutes out of each show and moving it to a weekday time slot.

On 23 January 2006, Lou Pearlman made a deal to bring Top of the Pops back to the airwaves in the United States. It was expected to be similar to the 1987 version, but it would also utilise the Billboard magazine music charts, most notably the Hot 100 chart. It was supposed to be planned for a possible 2006 or 2007 launch, but with several lawsuits against Lou and his companies (which resulted in his conviction in 2008), as well as the cancellation of the UK version, the proposed US project never went forward. On 19 August 2006, VH1 aired the UK series' final episode.

The United States had its own similar series, American Bandstand, which aired nationally on ABC from 1957 to 1987 (although it would continue in first-run syndication until 1988 and end its run on USA in 1989). Similar series also included Soul Train (1970–2006, featuring R&B artists), Club MTV (1986–92, featuring dance music acts; hosted by Downtown Julie Brown, an alumnus of TOTP as part of the show's last dance troupe Zoo) and Solid Gold (1980–88; like the early TOTP, it also used dance troupes).

=== New Zealand ===
The Top of the Pops brand has also been exported to New Zealand. Although the British show has been broadcast intermittently in New Zealand, the country historically relied on music video-based shows to demonstrate its own Top 20, as the major international acts, who dominated the local charts, considered New Zealand too small and remote to visit regularly. This changed to an extent in 2002, when the New Zealand government suggested a voluntary New Zealand music quota on radio (essentially a threat that if the stations did not impose a quota themselves then one would be imposed on them). The amount of local music played on radio stations increased, as did the number of local songs in the top 20. Therefore, a new local version of Top of the Pops became feasible for the first time, and the show was commissioned by Television New Zealand.

The hour-long show (as opposed to the 30-minute UK version) which was broadcast at 5 pm on Saturdays on TV2 contained a mixture of performances recorded locally on a sound stage in the Auckland CBD, as well as performances from the international versions of the show. The New Zealand Top 20 singles and Top 10 albums charts were also featured. Despite having a sizeable fan base, in 2006 TVNZ announced that Top of the Pops had been cancelled.

Free-to-air music channel C4 then picked up the UK version of Top of the Pops and aired it on Saturdays at 8 pm with a repeat screening on Thursdays. However, since the weekly UK version was discontinued itself, this arrangement also ended.

=== Africa, Asia and the Middle East ===
An edited version of the UK show was shown on BBC Prime, the weekend after UK transmission.

In addition, a licensed version was shown on the United Arab Emirates-based MBC 1 television channel. This version consisted of parts of the UK version, including the Top 10 charts, as well as live performances by Arabic pop singers.

=== Latin America ===
A complete version of the UK show was shown on People+Arts, two weeks after the UK transmission.

== Compilation albums ==
A number of compilation albums using the Top of the Pops brand have been issued over the years. The first one to reach the charts was BBC TV's The Best of Top of the Pops on the Super Beeb record label in 1975, which reached number 21 and in 1986 the BBC released The Wizard by Paul Hardcastle (the 1986–1990 Top of the Pops theme tune) on vinyl under the BBC Records and Tapes banner.

Starting in 1968 and carrying on through the 1970s a rival series of Top of the Pops albums were produced, however these had no connection with the television series except for its name. They were a series of budget cover albums of current chart hits recorded by anonymous session singers and musicians released on the Hallmark record label. They had initially reached the charts but were later disallowed due to a change in the criteria for entering the charts. These albums continued to be produced until the early 1980s, when the advent of compilation albums featuring the original versions of hits, such as the Now That's What I Call Music! series, led to a steep decline in their popularity.

In the 1990s, the BBC Top of the Pops brand was again licensed for use in a tie-in compilation series. Starting in 1995 with Sony Music's Columbia Records label, these double disc collections moved to the special marketing arm of PolyGram / Universal Music Group TV, before becoming a sister brand of the Now That's What I Call Music! range in the EMI / Virgin / Universal joint venture.

Similarly to the roles of Top of the Pops on BBC One and BBC Two in the late 1990s and early 2000s, the compilation albums range featured current hits for the main series and classic hits (such as '70s rock) for the Top of the Pops 2 spin-offs.

The Top of the Pops brand has now been licensed by EMI who released a compilation series in 2007–08, with one CD for each year that Top of the Pops was running. The boxset for the entire series of 43 discs was released 7 July 2008. A podcast supporting the release of the boxset featuring interviews with Mark Goodier, Miles Leonard, Malcolm McLaren and David Hepworth is available.

=== Number one on the Compilation Charts ===
These albums in the series reached No. 1:

- Top of the Pops 1 (Columbia, 1995)
- Top of the Pops '99 – Volume 2 (Universal Music TV, 1999)
- Top of the Pops 2000 – Volume Two (BBC Music / Universal Music TV, 2000)

== Top of the Pops magazine ==
Top of the Pops magazine has been running since February 1995, and filled the void in the BBC magazine portfolio where Number One magazine used to be. It began much in the mould of Q magazine, then changed its editorial policy to directly compete with popular teen celebrity magazines such as Smash Hits and Big, with free sticker giveaways replacing Brett Anderson covers.

A July 1996 feature on the Spice Girls coined the "Spice" nicknames for each member (Baby, Ginger, Posh, Scary and Sporty) that stayed with them throughout their career as a group and beyond.

The BBC announced that the magazine would continue in publication despite the end of the television series, and is still running.

An earlier Top of the Pops magazine appeared briefly in the mid-1970s. Mud drummer Dave Mount sat reading an edition throughout a 1975 appearance on the show.

== Top of the Pops Awards ==
The Top of the Pops Awards (also known as TOTP Awards) was an annual awards ceremony, with winners chosen by BBC One viewers, from 2001 to 2005. Hosted at the Manchester Arena, the awards was a collaboration between BBC and BBC Worldwide.

== Licensing ==
In May 2006, following a special Red Hot Chili Peppers concert recorded in the car park of BBC Television Centre, Hammersmith and Fulham Council (which governs the area the centre is located) informed the BBC that it lacked the necessary public entertainment licence (as required by the Licensing Act 2003). Until the BBC could obtain the licence, BBC staff stood-in as audience members for live music programmes.

== VHSs and DVDs ==
In 2002, a crossover direct-to-video VHS was released between Top of the Pops and Tweenies, containing footage taken from the episodes where the Tweenies themselves had performed on the show, which the characters watched on a TV screen at their playgroup.

In 2004 there was a DVD released called Top of the Pops 40th Anniversary 1964–2004 DVD. It features live performances, containing one song for each year, except 1966. (Two tracks from 1965 are featured instead). Also included as extras are seven opening titles, most notably the one with the flying coloured LP's from 1981. This title sequence had Phil Lynott's song "Yellow Pearl" as the theme. The 1986 and 1989 titles are also featured, with Paul Hardcastle's hit "The Wizard" as the theme. This DVD was to celebrate 40 years since the show started.

There was also a DVD quiz released in 2007 called The Essential Music Quiz. There was also a DVD in 2001 called Summer 2001, a sister DVD to the album of the same name.

== See also ==
- Alright Now
- The Old Grey Whistle Test
- Ready Steady Go!
- Revolver (TV series)
- Top of the Box
- The Tube (TV series)
