= Top of the Pops 2 =

- TOTP2 Title card (2013–2017), as seen on the Christmas 2013 special.
- Narrated by: Johnnie Walker (1994–97); Steve Wright (1997–2009); Mark Radcliffe (2009–2017)
- Theme music composer: Bill Padley (1994–1998); CCS (1998–2006, 2013–2017); Tony Gibber (2006–2013)
- Opening theme: "Red Hot Pop" (1994–1998); "Whole Lotta Love" (1998–2006, 2013–2017); "Now Get Out of That" (2006–2013)
- Country of origin: United Kingdom
- Original language: English
- No. of episodes: 523

Production
- Producers: Ric Blaxill (1994–97); Rory Sheehan (1997–1998); Mark Hagen (1999–2010)
- Running time: 30 minutes (1994–2007); 60 minutes (2006–2017)

Original release
- Network: BBC Two; BBC Four
- Release: 17 September 1994 – 22 December 2017

Related
- Top of the Pops; Top of the Pops Reloaded; TOTP@Play

Top of the Pops 2 (also known as TOTP2) is a British television music show broadcast on BBC Two showing archive footage from the long-running Top of the Pops show, some dating back to the 1960s when the programme first aired on British television, as well as other surviving BBC programmes.

== Format ==
The original format of the show consisted of various segments including "recorded for recall", which would show TOTP performances from a certain decade, "video stir" which featured a new music video from a popular artist in the charts, the "first time" would feature an artist's first TOTP appearance, "world hits" would feature a new international hit, "tomorrows hits" would feature artists who were predicted to enter the UK Top 40 the following week, and then "the original" would feature numerous performances from that week's edition of TOTP. The 'Top 10' singles chart and the number one single of the week would also be shown. This format existed until 1997, when the show format changed to only feature performances from the TOTP archive, mixed with the occasional exclusive new performance for TOTP2.

From its debut in 1994, the show was narrated by Johnnie Walker. Steve Wright took over narrator duties in 1997 until December 2009, when Mark Radcliffe took over presenter duties until the show's cancellation in 2017. To date, the presenter has never appeared in-vision, but provides voice-over commentary that introduces each performance.

For a period of time, the BBC ran a daily version of TOTP2 in which celebrities chose their favourite archive performances. These celebrities, typically comedians, have included Vic Reeves & Bob Mortimer, Phill Jupitus and Jack Dee. There have also been a number of TOTP2 specials, where a "greatest hits" show dedicated to one musician or band has aired. Examples include the Bee Gees, Elvis Presley, Shania Twain and Dionne Warwick specials which aired between 1997–2003.

Since its debut, TOTP2 has also broadcast regular specials for certain theme nights or calendar events. Examples include Christmas and New Years Eve specials.

=== Hiatus ===
In 2004, the controller of BBC Two, Roly Keating, announced that the programme was to be "rested". After the 4 June 2004 episode, the channel's only subsequent TOTP2 broadcasts for two years were Christmas specials on 24 December 2004 and 24 December 2005.

The hiatus preceded a format change for the main Top of the Pops programme, which was moved from its BBC One Friday-night primetime slot to a new slot on Sunday nights on BBC Two in 2005. Top of the Pops' new format merged its usual format of new chart performances with the TOTP2 format of archival recordings.

This Top of the Pops format ran until the show was cancelled in July 2006.

=== After Top of the Pops ===
After the cancellation of Top of the Pops, TOTP2 returned to BBC Two on 30 September 2006. The new show format was similar to the earlier TOTP2, but also included live/original BBC performances. These episodes were produced and broadcast in the 4:3 aspect ratio like the majority of its archive material, except for the first two episodes, which were shown in the 16:9 aspect ratio to accommodate new performances. The first 50-minute special included Nelly Furtado, Jamelia and Razorlight, before it reverted to a 30-minute weekly format at 20:00.

The BBC planned to replace the main Top of the Pops special on Christmas Day 2008 with a special edition of TOTP2, that would have included some live performances and archive footage as well as the 2008 Christmas number one UK single; these plans were later scrapped due to complaints by viewers. This led to Simon Cowell asking the BBC to buy the rights to the Top of the Pops brand so he could produce a version of it for ITV1. The BBC later refused Cowell's offer and announced that they would show TOTP on Christmas Day on BBC One as well as the TOTP2 specials on BBC Two.

=== Final episodes ===
Since 2008, new sporadic TOTP2 specials have aired, most notably Christmas specials, alongside repeats of episodes originally broadcast between 1997 and 2012.

On 27 June 2009, TOTP2 returned unexpectedly to celebrate the life of Michael Jackson, who had died two days earlier. This later turned out to be the last episode to be narrated by Steve Wright.

In December 2009, Mark Radcliffe took over as presenter of TOTP2. On 10 May 2010, a TOTP2 80s Special aired on BBC Two. This marked the 500th edition of TOTP2.

December 2013 saw the introduction of a new Top of the Pops logo, and a presentation refresh for TOTP2. It also saw the return of "Whole Lotta Love" as the shows theme tune, this variant being a mix of the original and the 1998 remix version.

In recent years, BBC Four has aired vintage editions of Top of the Pops – originally 35 years to the week of the original broadcast, starting with 1976 repeats shown in 2011 – with the renewed interest in the original shows earning ratings of up to a million viewers, prompting the channel to repeat editions of TOTP2, such as in the aftermath of the Christmas Day 2016 death of George Michael. In addition, various performances from TOTP and other programmes have been repackaged as music specials by the TOTP2 team, such as "Disco at the BBC", "Country at the BBC" and "Abba at the BBC". Music documentaries fronted by the likes of Nile Rodgers and Gregory Porter have also featured alongside, under the slogan "Friday night is Music Night".

In tandem with their launch of whole-episode TOTP reruns, BBC Four launched a new clip-show format, Top of the Pops: Big Hits. The first programme covered the period from 1964 to 1975 (the era prior to the full-show reruns starting in 1976) and subsequent editions have compiled a selection of music from each year. Similarly to TOTP2, the Big Hits programmes provide additional information over each performance in the form of onscreen captions; however, Big Hits does not have a voiceover. A Christmas show in the Big Hits format, Top of the Pops: Christmas Hits aired on BBC Four in 2016, with no Christmas TOTP2 running that year.

The 2017 Christmas show was the last episode of TOTP2 to be produced and broadcast, though past episodes are still repeated on BBC Two and BBC Four.

== Controversies ==
In September 2014, the BBC accidentally transmitted an episode containing footage of disgraced presenter Jimmy Savile, posthumously revealed to be a prolific sexual abuser which resulted in seven viewer complaints and a statement of apology by the BBC. The offending footage was subsequently removed from BBC iPlayer. The repeat run of Top of the Pops on BBC Four was already omitting episodes featuring Savile and Dave Lee Travis (due to a suspended sentence), while Jonathan King's reviews of the American charts were edited out of the repeats, due to his conviction. Additionally, episodes presented by or featuring performances by disgraced performers including Gary Glitter are also no longer shown following the singer's 1999 conviction for downloading child pornography.

== Presentation ==
The original opening sequence, used between 1994 and 1998 used a 'rewind' theme to represent the show's rewound content. Paula Williams devised the concept by filming abstract objects in a studio on 16mm film with bold 'pop' colours. The sequence was edited and composited at Red Post Production on Flame. The presentation style of TOTP2 in 1994 was actually ahead of parent show, Top of the Pops, which didn't get a similar presentation update until 1995.

Since 1998, the presentation of TOTP2 has generally followed the style of parent show, Top of the Pops. TOTP2 used modified versions of the May 1998–December 2001 and January 2002–November 2003 titles during those eras of the show. However, between November 2003 and December 2005, an original title sequence based around the 2003 Top of the Pops spiral logo was used alongside the original version of "Whole Lotta Love" by CCS.

TOTP2 title card used from the first episode on September 17, 1994 until March 28, 1998.

TOTP2 title card used from September 12, 1998 to Christmas 2001.

TOTP2 title card used from January 2002 to November 2003.

TOTP2 title card used from December 2, 2003 to Christmas Eve 2005.

TOTP2 title card used from August 2006 to October 2013.

== Episode guide ==
This is a guide to show a list of new episodes not in a particular series of TOTP2, broadcast since December 2008.

Original Transmission	Episode	Runtime	Narrator	Channel
28 June 2009	Michael Jackson: A TOTP2 Tribute Special	60 minutes	Steve Wright	BBC Two
23 December 2009	Christmas 2009	90 minutes	Mark Radcliffe	BBC Two
19 February 2010	TOTP2 Goes Latin	30 minutes	N/A	BBC Four
10 May 2010	80s Special	90 minutes	Mark Radcliffe	BBC Two
23 May 2010	Wham! Special	30 minutes	Mark Radcliffe	BBC Two
28 May 2010	Duran Duran Special	30 minutes	Mark Radcliffe	BBC Two
25 September 2010	School Days	60 minutes	Mark Radcliffe	BBC Two
21 December 2010	Christmas 2010	90 minutes	Mark Radcliffe	BBC Two
21 December 2011	Christmas 2011	90 minutes	Mark Radcliffe	BBC Two
28 January 2012	The 60s	30 minutes	Mark Radcliffe	BBC Two
4 February 2012	The 60s	30 minutes	Mark Radcliffe	BBC Two
12 February 2012	The 60s	30 minutes	Mark Radcliffe	BBC Two
25 February 2012	Boybands	60 minutes	Mark Radcliffe	BBC Two
3 March 2012	Girl Groups	60 minutes	Mark Radcliffe	BBC Two
10 March 2012	Pop Stars	60 minutes	Mark Radcliffe	BBC Two
2 May 2012 – 1 June 2012		30 minutes	Mark Radcliffe	BBC Two
3 June 2012	Donna Summer	30 minutes	Mark Radcliffe	BBC Two
4 August 2012	Summertime Special	60 minutes	Mark Radcliffe	BBC Two
22 December 2012	Christmas 2012	90 minutes	Mark Radcliffe	BBC Two
9 November 2013	Status Quo	45 minutes	N/A	BBC Two
22 December 2013	Christmas 2013	90 minutes	Mark Radcliffe	BBC Two
22 December 2014	Christmas 2014	90 minutes	Mark Radcliffe	BBC Two
6 February 2015	Genesis	40 minutes	N/A	BBC Two
30 May 2015	FA Cup	60 minutes	Mark Radcliffe	BBC One
12 December 2015	Christmas 2015	60 minutes	Mark Radcliffe	BBC Two
21 December 2017	Xmas 2017	90 minutes	Mark Radcliffe	BBC Four

== On other channels ==
From 2004 onwards, repeats of edited episodes of TOTP2 have been shown on a number of UKTV channels, including Dave, and Yesterday. Recent episodes of the show are also repeated on BBC Two and BBC Four occasionally.
