= Boys and Girls (game show) =

- Genre: Gameshow
- Presented by: Vernon Kay, Orla O'Rourke; Spin-offs: Dougie Anderson
- Opening theme: "Music To Watch Girls By", Andy Williams
- Country of origin: United Kingdom
- Original language: English
- No. of series: 1
- No. of episodes: 6

Production
- Producer: UMTV
- Running time: 60–90 minutes (including adverts)

Original release
- Network: Channel 4
- Release: 1 March – 17 May 2003

Boys and Girls was a short-lived British television gameshow broadcast in 2003 by Channel 4.

The series was produced by Chris Evans through his company UMTV, and was presented by Vernon Kay. Evans only occasionally appeared on screen, usually as the driver of the golf buggy used to ferry the winning contestants off-set at the end of the show. Thus the show was one of the first Evans-produced shows not to feature Evans himself in a presenting role (in fact, Evans did not regularly front any UMTV programmes until OFI Sunday in late 2005). Kay's co-presenter was Irish presenter and model Orla O'Rourke. Also featuring Oliver Knight of Spectrecom Films.

== Format and gameplay ==
Boys and Girls took the form of a battle-of-the-sexes contest. The audience for each show would be made up of 200 potential contestants – 100 male and 100 female.

The contestants would initially assemble in the afternoon for what was referred to on-air as the 'pre-show party' – this saw the contestants assemble in a large hall. Each member of the group was given a few seconds to perform a stunt, skill or talent with the aim of impressing the 100 members of the opposite sex. Following this, each group would vote on who their favourite performer was (for the main game selection), and also rate the attractiveness of each performer (for the Babe or Minger game).

In the studio, games included 'Babe or Minger', where Kay would randomly select members of the 200 and invite them to guess whether they were a 'babe' (included in the top 50 of the vote carried out by the opposite sex) or a 'minger' (in the bottom 50).

Other short games and features would then follow, such as a segment in which tickets for a future show were offered to home viewers living in a featured street who performed a task set out by the host (such as opening the front door in their pyjamas).

Then the 'quiz' would be played. Two celebrity guests – one for each team – would enter the audience to canvas the team's opinions in response to a series of questions posed by Kay. These questions would be on the subject of relationships and would take the form of an 'either/or' choice, i.e. "What's more important, a big heart or a big wallet?". The celeb would gather the audience's apparent majority opinion and present this as an answer to Kay. If this answer matched the answer on Kay's card (as gleaned from an earlier general poll) then the team scored a point. The team which scored the most points in the Quiz would be the team represented in the Main Game.

The Main Game would see three members of the winning team take part in a final challenge, game or stunt. The three contestants selected to play in the Main Game would be the contestant voted top performer at the pre-show party by the opposite sex, the contestant voted in first place in the Babe or Minger vote, and one other contestant selected randomly from a draw machine.

The winner of the final challenge would get to select one of the contenders of the opposite sex to join them for a week in the Boys and Girls apartment in London, where they would be awarded the £100,000 prize money to spend on purchases meeting conditions laid down during the week (e.g. "Spend £30,000 on items that spell out V-E-R-N-O-N-K-A-Y"). This 'shopping challenge' would be filmed through the week for broadcast on Boys and Girls Friday (see below). Any money not spent during the shopping challenge would be forfeited.

The main game would be followed by the final element of the show, the Endgame, for which the previous week's winning contestants would be brought back into the studio, along with their purchases from the shopping week. It would then be determined whether these contestants would get to keep their purchases: in the first week, this was determined by a public vote, but in all subsequent editions the outcome of a quiz determined the result.

== Spin-offs ==
The programme had two spin-offs. Both were presented by Dougie Anderson and aired on E4.

Boys and Girls Do It With Dougie was a live magazine-format 30-minute show broadcast on E4 following the broadcast of the main Channel 4 programme. The show featured Anderson in conversation with contestants from the show and celebrity guests (sometimes, but not always, guests who had taken part in the main show). There would usually be footage from the 'pre-show party' and, where required, from the preceding day's Friday programme.

Boys and Girls Friday was broadcast in a Friday mid-evening 30-minute slot and was principally a 'fly on the wall' format (introduced and narrated by Anderson) in which cameras would follow each week's winners during their week in the apartment as they undertook their shopping challenges. Edited highlights from this programme would be shown when the contestants returned to the studio the following day for the endgame.

== Failure and cancellation ==
The show, reputed to have cost Channel 4 in the region of £500,000 per episode, was heavily promoted by Channel 4 ahead of launch (with extensive advertising) and initially occupied a prime Saturday night slot. However, the show's poor ratings saw the show slip back in the schedule to a later slot. Though all planned editions of the first series went ahead, the programme was dropped after one series, making it one of Channel 4's most expensive and prominent flops. It was also the first in a string of flops for UMTV, with many of the firm's subsequent programmes (such as The Terry and Gaby Show and OFI Sunday) failing to match the success of earlier Chris Evans projects such as Don't Forget Your Toothbrush and TFI Friday. Evans has since returned more successfully to broadcasting as a host of programmes for BBC Radio 2, and Vernon Kay has also been able to bounce back with a successful TV and radio career including shows on BBC Radio 1 and ITV's All Star Family Fortunes.
