= OFI =

OFI may refer to:

- Overseas Filipino Investors, Filipino expatriates who contribute to the economy of the Philippines through remittances, buying property, and creating businesses
- OFI, a Greek association football club based on the island of Crete
- O.F.I. (sports club), a Greek multi-sports club based on the island of Crete
- OFI Sunday, a UK entertainment show hosted by Chris Evans
- OFI (web standard), the OpenURL Framework for Context-Sensitive Services (ANSI/NISO Z39.88-2004)
- Ocean Frontier Institute (OFI), a non-profit research and higher education organization dedicated to ocean-based research and data.
- Orangutan Foundation International (OFI), headquartered Los Angeles, to rescue-rehabilitate orangutans for release back in Indonesian rainforests
