= David Kuo =

David Kuo may refer to:

- David Kuo (author) (1968–2013), American writer
- David Kuo (financial media personality) (born 1956), British financial expert and BBC radio personality
