= Dougie Anderson =

Scottish presenter (born 1976)

- Born: Douglas James Anderson; 27 May 1976 (age 50); Edinburgh, Scotland
- Occupations: Writer, broadcaster and voice-over artist
- Years active: 1999–present
- Known for: Television and radio presenting, writer
- Website: www.mrdouglasanderson.com

Douglas James Anderson (born 27 May 1976 in Edinburgh) is a Scottish radio and television presenter, writer and voice-over artist who trained at Queen Margaret University, Edinburgh.

== Radio ==
Anderson is notable for his regular guest appearances on BBC Radio Five Live's Fighting Talk. After co-presenting Crufts with Clare Balding he is introduced as "The Husky Voiced Scotsman". In 2008, he contributed to the book to accompany the series.

== Stand up ==
2011 saw Anderson launch on to the standup comedy scene, alongside old co-host and radio DJ Iain Lee. The regular night in Camden, London called Clip Joint, part standup part review show, featured a mix of archive television shows, audience participation, special guests and Lipton's Ice Tea. Special guests have included Josie Long, Miles Jupp and writer of The Inbetweeners, Iain Morris.

== Television ==
Anderson began his television career as a music reporter for UK Play's The Phone Zone. His early work included RI:SE on Channel 4, That Was So Last Week on Five, the BBC's coverage of Glastonbury Festival and T in the Park the BBC Three programme Stars in Fast Cars, Air on Radio Scotland, and was one of the presenters on the Channel 4 game show Boys and Girls for Chris Evans's production company.

In 2017, he made a series of YouTube films with Graham Norton's company So Television under the title The Douglas Anderson Show. This saw him ruminating on aspects of pop culture including music, film and television whist visiting areas of musical and filmic importance. The show's subheading was 'Popular Culture Defined'. A regular feature was Behind The Man where Anderson would literally sit behind the person he was interviewing. Interviewees throughout the series included Idris Elba, Frankie Boyle, Vin Diesel, Stephen Mangan, Melanie C and Richard Osman.

In 2007 he presented the Grovesnor UK Poker Tour and in 2008 Anderson presented the Red Bull Air Race World Series alongside Konnie Huq for Channel 4. The show was nominated in the Best Sports Programme category at the 2009 Broadcast Television Awards but lost out to the BBC's 2008 Grand National coverage. Later that year Anderson presented the Scottish BAFTA awards ceremony with Lorraine Kelly.

In 2009, Anderson went on tour with the England cricket team as part of a series of films entitled The Nightwatchman for Vodafone to commemorate the 2009 Ashes. Anderson was investigative reporter at the 2010 and 2011 DFS Crufts Dog Show for More 4, from the NEC in Birmingham, alongside the BBC sports presenter Claire Balding. Anderson's coverage of these events was presented from the point of view of a beginner who was keen to learn more about the events.

== Film ==
In 2018, Anderson took a behind the camera role on Bart Layton's feature film American Animals where he worked closely with Layton as music consultant.

In 2015 his film The London Nobody Knows Now played to sell out audiences at the BFI London On Film Festival and was also inducted into the BFI Archive. In Anderson's film, he critiques the original 1967 James Mason fronted The London Nobody knows while also re-visiting its locations and examining how they have changed over the years.

In 2010 Anderson worked with Belle & Sebastian on the promotional film "Belle & Sebastian Write About Love", launched to coincide with the release of the album of the same name. Playing the dual roles of host and the group's stressed but pragmatic manager, the film also features the band performing songs from the album. The Guardian selected the show as a Pick of the Week, calling it "brilliantly filmed, edited and slightly oddball". Anderson reprised his role by introducing the band onstage for their headline slot at the All Tomorrows Parties Festival in December 2010 in Minehead. Anderson has talked about working with the band as well as his passion for music.

Anderson has written, directed and starred in various short films. In 2009, he made The Skills of Conversation – The Heartburn Pause.

In 2011, Anderson completed an international distribution deal for his latest short film Timber! which will be shown in the USA and Europe. Written and directed by Anderson, the film also stars Miles Jupp and Emily Bevan.

== Books ==
His first book was the novella-length What To Talk About When There’s Nothing To Talk About, designed to help those who struggle to have anything to talk about at social events, such as dinner parties, where conversation is imperative.

His second book, Left Of The Mainstream, published in 2016, has been critically acclaimed. The book is part memoir and part guide to DIY creativity and features vignettes of his career thus far, ranging from the highs of multi-faceted creativity and genuine A-list celebrity shoulder-rubbing to the lows of severe allergic reactions to bus travel and unexpected near-death experiences.

== Podcast ==
Anderson has made three series and a number of specials of his music podcast, The Public Service Broadcast. They see him playing the best in new music, older and often little-known classics, film and television soundtracks.

He has also hosted Back To The Culture which sees him interview comedian Miles Jupp about his greatest cultural passions.

His latest is Seven Floors Up, a mix series on Mixcloud which began in 2019 and runs to the present day. These mixes see a variety of music genres interspersed with an array audio clips.

== Other work ==
In 2011 Douglas presented Scoreboard, the first ever football show to be broadcast on Facebook. The show made by Screenpop, a subsidiary of Fremantle Media featured predictions by pundits Scott Minto and Jason Cundy and the online Facebook audience on the forthcoming weekend Premier League matches.

Anderson runs club events in Glasgow, Edinburgh and London. He is currently resident DJ at Dirty Little Secret at Madame Jojo's in Soho and has also appeared on numerous occasions at Scared To Dance in London.

Anderson has written for The Scotsman, The Herald and BBC Online. He has written articles on various cultural figures including Serge Gainsbourg, The Beta Band, Harvey Pekar, Bob Monkhouse and Bob Lind.
