= Catalina Guirado =

British-New Zealander actress, reality TV star, model and designer

- Born: Catalina Jane Guirado
- Other name: Catalina Guirado-Cheadle
- Education: Guildhall School of Music and Drama
- Occupations: Actress; reality TV star; model; designer
- Known for: TFI Friday; I'm a Celebrity...Get Me Out of Here!
- Spouse: Matt Cheadle (m. 2007)

Catalina Jane Guirado is a British-New Zealand actress, reality TV star, model and designer who is best known for starring as Chris Evans' sidekick "Gorgeous Girl" on TFI Friday from 1996 to 1997.

== Early life ==
Guirado began performing the violin at age 7 and by age 12 she had made performances at both the Royal Albert Hall and the Royal Festival Hall. She went on to receive a scholarship at the Guildhall School of Music and Drama.

== Career ==
=== Modelling ===
Guirado was scouted by Vogue at the age of 15. Since then, she has appeared in multiple other magazines including Elle, Cosmopolitan, FHM, Maxim, Loaded and SKY Magazine, as well as being named in FHM's 100 Sexiest Women as well as various other magazines.

During her modelling career, Guirado has walked the runway for prolific designers such as Vivienne Westwood, Michiko Koshino, Scott Henshall and Rifat Ozbek. She was also the face of international advertising campaigns for such companies as Dove, Wella, Toni & Guy, L'Oréal and Lynx.

=== Television and film ===
Guirado's first appearance on television was on TFI Friday as a regular role being Chris Evans' sidekick, "Gorgeous Girl". She received a starring role during the "Ugly Blokes" segment of the show, where unattractive men would receive the opportunity of turning down her advances. Her regular stint on the show gave her a household name as an it girl. During series 3 of the show her role was dropped with no information surfacing as to why.

Guirado's success on TFI Friday and on her modelling career landed her a position on series 2 of ITV's reality television show I'm a Celebrity...Get Me Out of Here!. She entered the camp on 28 April 2003 and left on 8 May, placing 7th. She (along with the rest of the eliminated campmates) returned for the series finale on 12 May.

Following her appearance on I'm a Celebrity...Get Me Out of Here!, Guirado was featured on many talk shows including Loose Lips and This Morning. She was also featured as a special guest interview on comedy sketch show Bo' Selecta!.

In the same year as her I'm a Celebrity...Get Me Out of Here! appearance, Guirado was invited to take part in the Stars in Their Eyes 'I'm A Celebrity' special, where she chose singer Deborah Harry. Guirado was joined by various other contestants from series 1 and 2 of the show. Guirado ended up winning and was crowned champion.

Her fame during 2003 ran throughout the whole year, with Guirado making appearances various shows including Celebrities Under Pressure and GMTV, as well as hosting her own documentary about her career and sexualisation in media named Catalina's Commercial Clips.

In 2004, Guirado made another reality TV appearance on Back to Reality. Guirado ended up 9th and was placed in the bottom two twice during her short stay, making her one of the least popular contestants on the show.

In 2005, Guirado made her break into the film industry, starring as main character Grace in Private Moments (2005). She also appeared as a main character in Blue Sombrero (2005), being the nurse. Guirado hasn't since made a return to the film industry.

=== Music and art ===
Guirado was signed to the Universal Music Publishing Group to produce a song. Guirado's song, "Shine", did not gain any traction, however it was covered by Welsh girl band TnT.

Guirado was the face of music web TV company LP33.tv, starting out as Senior Vice President in 2008. She was in charge of management and general PR, being the one to organise music festivals for the website. Guirado left the company in 2009 and it folded two years later.

Guirado stayed in the music scene for a while, taking the role of executive consultant or TV host for many different music festivals including the Sunset Strip Music Festival and various music TV shows including some for McDonald's.

Following her father's death in July 2010, Guirado opened the Juan Antonio Guirado foundation and became an art curator for his works. Three years later in 2013, Guirado decided to carry on his legacy and open Guirado Design. Guirado is now an artist and designer, where she uses her business to blend art and fashion.

== Personal life ==
Guirado married i-94 band member Matt Cheadle in August 2007 in an inn in Cookham Dean, Berkshire. Guirado is sometimes referred to as Catalina Guirado-Cheadle, however she is commonly referred to by her maiden name. Her marriage was publicised by OK! magazine.

Guirado's father died in July 2010 from lung cancer. Guirado expressed how she wanted to embed him into art history.

Guirado has a fashion and lifestyle blog, Cat-Talk. Guirado is also a horsewoman and has a horse named Grace-Kelly.
