= The Ginger Prince =

The Ginger Prince is a nickname of several people:

- Paul Scholes, an English footballer
- Chris Evans (presenter), an English entertainer
- Prince Harry, a British prince
