= Don't Forget Your Toothbrush =

British game show

- Genre: Light entertainment
- Presented by: Chris Evans
- Country of origin: United Kingdom
- Original language: English
- No. of series: 2
- No. of episodes: 26

Production
- Running time: 60 minutes (inc. adverts)
- Production company: Ginger Productions

Original release
- Network: Channel 4
- Release: 12 February 1994 – 25 February 1995

Don't Forget Your Toothbrush is a British light entertainment TV programme that aired on Channel 4 from 12 February 1994 to 25 February 1995 and was hosted by Chris Evans.

== Background ==
Don't Forget Your Toothbrush was written and presented by Chris Evans in his first major venture away from The Big Breakfast. The first pilot was considered unsuccessful by executives and Evans himself. Channel 4 chief executive Michael Grade said that the pilot was "like amateur's hour". After two failed pilots, the broadcaster was reluctant to waste the money that they had spent developing the show. At some point in the process, executive producer Sebastian Scott left the project and Evans invited experienced game show producer William G. Stewart to develop the show. The show ran for two series in 1994 and 1995 on Channel 4. Shows were transmitted live on Saturday nights the first series at 10pm, the second at 9pm. Each episode would be repeated at teatime on the following Monday (series 1) or Sunday (series 2).

The theme music was composed by David Arnold, though Jools Holland (with his Big Band in series one, and Rhythm and Blues Orchestra in series two) provided the music during the live shows. The ensemble provided accompaniment for a musical performance by the star guest of each week's episode; guests included Cher, Barry White, Lulu and Tony Hadley. Evans ended each show with a song. In series one, he sang Morecambe and Wise's "Bring Me Sunshine" with that week's star guest, while in series two he sang Andy Williams' "It's So Easy".

The star guest took part in a "Superfan" quiz, competing against an audience member who was a huge fan of theirs to see which of the two knew more about the guest. Evans asked toss-up questions for two minutes, and would often stop the clock after a question to have a brief conversation about it with the guest. Both the guest and the fan brought a personal possession to the studio, and the winner received the loser's item (e.g. a fan of Paul Young risking his first snooker trophy, and Young himself risking a coffee percolator).

Don't Forget Your Toothbrush was also a game show, with members of the audience chosen to participate in a series of humorous challenges and win cash or prizes. One game featured during the second series involved home viewers following Evans' instructions to flash their house lights on and off at a particular moment. A camera crew in a mystery location would search for someone taking part. When a house had been found, Evans would read three unusual facts about that area, then give the occupants two minutes to throw 10 named items out of specific windows (e.g. "Throw a sofa cushion out of the living room window"). They received £1,000 for winning the game, thrown to them by the crew, and were not named on camera.

The final challenge of each episode was the "Light Your Lemon" quiz. Each member of the audience was obliged to bring a passport and a packed suitcase to the studio, and to arrange to take the following week off work (unless they were unemployed or, as was pointed out, did not care if they lost their jobs). Two members were selected to play the quiz as a team, and a postcard was drawn from those sent in by home viewers. The team would win a holiday to one of two destinations, one much more exotic and appealing than the other, with both chosen for their similar-sounding names (such as Martinique versus Margate, or the Cayman Islands versus Canvey Island). They were asked a maximum of nine questions about the exotic destination, alternating between teammates; each right or wrong answer lit a section of a giant cocktail glass or ice cream cone, respectively. If the team gave five correct answers, they would "light the lemon" on the glass and win the exotic holiday. However, if they missed five, they would "flash the Flake" on the cone and Evans then called the home viewer and asked him/her one question concerning something that had happened during the episode. If the viewer either missed the question or failed to answer Evans' call within five rings, the team won the exotic holiday by default; a correct answer awarded it to the viewer and the less appealing one to the team. Regardless of the outcome, the team departed for their holiday immediately after the show, and the viewer departed for the exotic one on the following day if he/she had won it. (On some episodes, a team that missed five questions would automatically receive the less appealing holiday, without a home viewer being called.) Evans would introduce this segment by looking between alternate cameras in time to a drum beat that parodied the scene changes from one of his favourite TV shows, Captain Scarlet and the Mysterons.

The hostess for the first series was Evans' then-girlfriend Rachel Tatton-Brown, who had previously worked on The Big Breakfast. Despite being a former model, Tatton-Brown was uncomfortable in front of the cameras and aspired to move onto something else. She was replaced in the second series by his then-new girlfriend, Jadene Doran, whom he frequently introduced as "Ms Let-Your-Hair-Down" and who let her hair fall loose as she arrived onstage, by releasing it from its tied-up style or removing a hat.

In the penultimate episode of the first series, Evans constantly touted a huge surprise throughout the show, but did not reveal it until "Light Your Lemon" was about to begin. He announced that if the studio contestants won the exotic holiday, then every member of the audience would go for a week's holiday at Disneyland Paris. They won, and the whole audience left for Disneyland Paris immediately after the show.

During the second series, it was announced that there would be no third series, in order to allow the show to go out on a high. Evans soon signed up to host the Radio 1 Breakfast Show, and returned to Channel 4 with TFI Friday. In the final episode of this series, the item-throwing game was played for £2,000, and the "Light Your Lemon" quiz gave the chosen studio contestants a chance to win either a Ferrari 308 or a fish finger.

== Transmissions ==
Series	Start date	End date	Episodes
1	12 February 1994	7 May 1994	13
2	26 November 1994	25 February 1995	13

== International versions ==
Country	Local name	Host(s)	Network	Dates
Australia	Don't Forget Your Toothbrush	Tim Ferguson and Wendy Mooney	Nine Network	1995
Belgium (Dutch)	Vergeet je Tandenborstel Niet	Walters Grootaers	VT4	1999
Denmark	Husk lige tandbørsten	Casper Christensen and Anette Toftgård; Christian Fuhlendoff and Christina Bjørn	Danmarks Radio	1995–1996; 2012
Finland	Passi ja hammasharja	Tino Singh and Taru Valkeapää	MTV3	1996–1998
France	N'oubliez pas votre brosse à dents	Nagui	France 2	1994–1996
Germany	Pack die Zahnbürste ein	Ingolf Lück; Elmar Hörig	Sat.1	1994–1996
Italy	Non Dimenticate Lo Spazzolino da Denti	Fiorello; Gerry Scotti and Ambra Angiolini	Canale 5 Italia 1	1995–1997
Jordan	بلا فرشة	Rahaf Sawalha; Waleed Sobbhi	Amman TV	2020
Netherlands	Uhhh... Vergeet Je Tandenborstel Niet!	Rolf Wouters	Veronica Television; Comedy Central Family (reruns)	1995–1999; 2009
Norway	Glem ikke tannbørsten	Paal Tarjei Aasheim	TV3	2000
Portugal	Não se Esqueça da Escova de Dentes	Teresa Guilherme	SIC	1995
Spain	No te olvides el cepillo de dientes	Álex Casanovas and Paula Vázquez	Antena 3	1995
Sweden	Glöm inte tandborsten	Joakim Geigert	TV4	1994
United States	Don't Forget Your Toothbrush	Mark Curry	Comedy Central	2000
