= Danny Baker =

Former BBC presenter (born 1957)

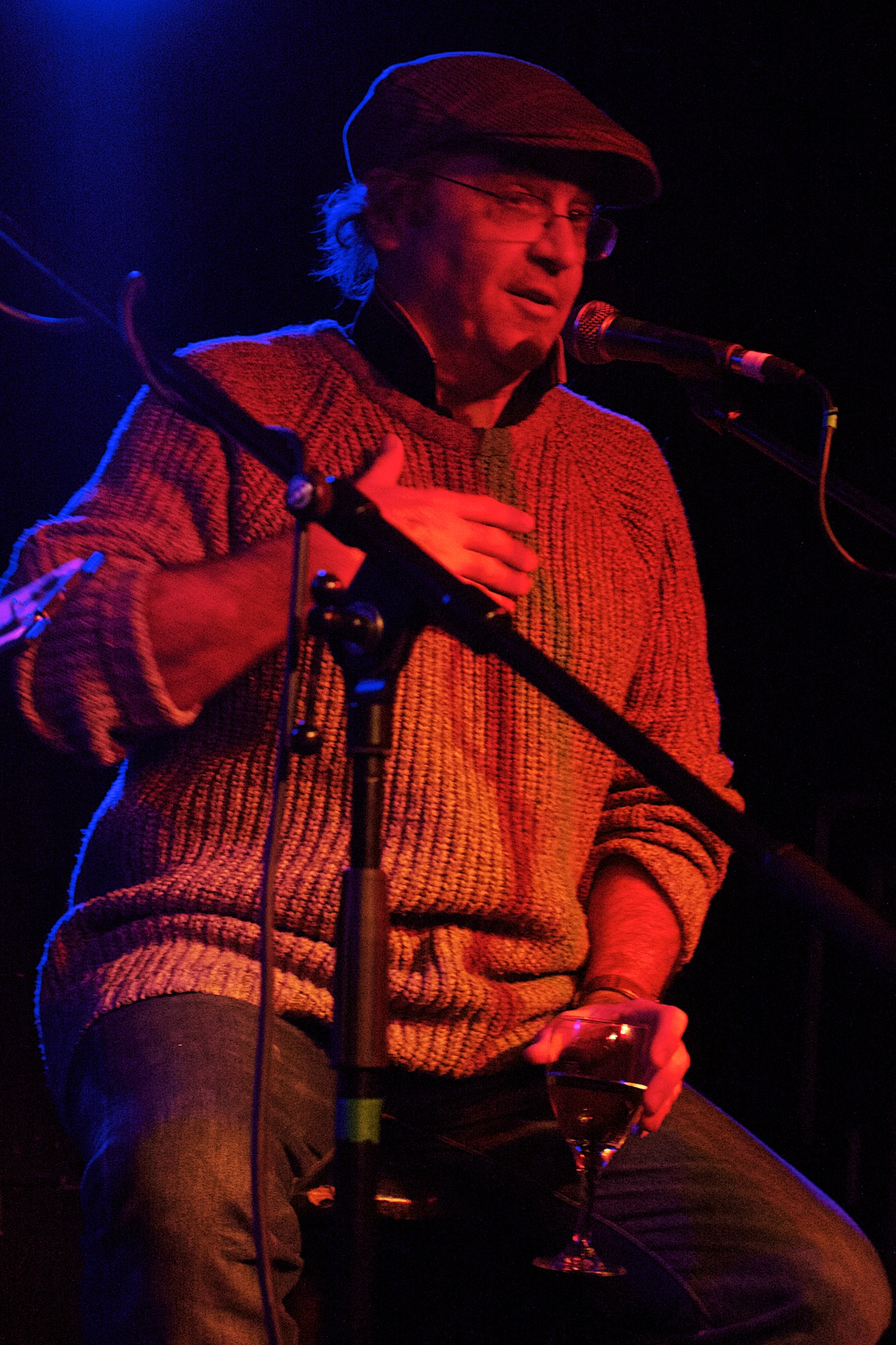
- Baker in 2012
- Born: 22 June 1957 (age 69); Deptford, London, England
- Occupations: Radio DJ, presenter, journalist
- Spouse: Wendy Baker (m. 1988)
- Children: 3
- Danny Baker's voice Recorded July 2007 from the BBC Radio 4 programme Desert Island Discs

Danny Baker (born 22 June 1957) is an English comedy writer, journalist, radio DJ and screenwriter. Throughout his career he has largely presented for London's regional radio and television.

Baker was born in Deptford to a working-class family and raised in Bermondsey. From 1977 he wrote for the punk zine Sniffin' Glue, and from there was hired by the New Musical Express, where he worked as a writer, reviewer, and interviewer. Moving into television in 1980, he began presenting London Weekend Television's Twentieth Century Box and reporting for The Six O'Clock Show. In 1989 he began radio presenting for BBC Radio London and in 1990 joined the newly established BBC Radio 5. In 1997 he was dismissed from the latter, accused of inciting threatening behaviour toward a football referee. That decade, he also began writing for television.

From 2002 to 2012 Baker presented the daily morning radio show on BBC Radio London and in 2007 also presented the channel's all-day podcast, the All Day Breakfast Show. Between 2012 and 2017 he published a three-volume autobiography, which was used as the basis for the 2015 BBC sitcom Cradle to Grave.

In 2019, the BBC dismissed Baker after he posted a tweet that featured a vintage photograph of a couple holding hands with a costumed chimpanzee. His accompanying text, "Royal baby leaves hospital," referred to the (at the time) recent announcement of the birth of Archie Mountbatten-Windsor, but was interpreted by many as Baker mocking The Duchess of Sussex's racial heritage. Baker denied any racial motivation for the tweet.

== Early life ==
Baker grew up in Bermondsey and attended Rotherhithe Primary School and then, instead of taking up a grammar school place, went to the nearby West Greenwich Secondary Boys' School, Deptford. After leaving school at 14, he worked in One Stop Records, a small record shop in the West End of London. The youngest of three children, he has an older sister, Sharon, and had an older brother, Michael, who died aged 29 when Danny was 24.

== Career ==
=== Print journalism ===
In 1977, Baker started writing for the punk fanzine Sniffin' Glue which was founded by his old schoolfriend Mark Perry which in turn led to an offer from the New Musical Express, then edited by Nick Logan. Baker began working as the office receptionist, but was soon contributing regular articles and reviews before progressing to interviews. He often refers to these times during his radio shows, regularly citing examples of the ridiculous behaviour exhibited by his rock star interviewees.

In the later 1990s, Baker wrote a weekly sports column for The Times and was briefly a columnist for early issues of film magazine Empire.

=== Television ===
==== Reporting for LWT (1980s) ====
Baker started his TV career in 1980 at London Weekend Television (LWT), as the presenter of Twentieth Century Box – a series of regional documentaries on elements of youth culture in London, produced by Janet Street-Porter. One edition in the first series documented the burgeoning new wave of British heavy metal (NWOBHM) scene, including an early TV appearance of Iron Maiden performing at The Marquee Club and interviews with "air guitarists". Other editions also featured early appearances from the likes of Spandau Ballet and Depeche Mode.

Baker's first mainstream break was as roving reporter-presenter on the Michael Aspel LWT regional magazine The Six O'Clock Show alongside former Mastermind winner and former London black cab driver Fred Housego. Paul Ross (brother of Jonathan Ross whom Baker had as his best man) was his researcher. During his stint on The Six O'Clock Show, Baker was filmed having an altercation with a British Rail press officer. This clip is often resurrected for clip shows and can be seen on YouTube.

==== Writing and presenting (early–late 1990s) ====
Baker appeared regularly on LWT's regional output during the 1980s and early 1990s – working on such programmes as Six O'Clock Live, Danny Baker's Londoners, and in 1991, The Game – a six-part series which featured coverage of teams involved in the fourth division of the East London Sunday Football League. The series was later released on DVD.

Baker began writing for television programmes in 1992 after being asked to prepare a piece for one of the first archive clip shows: TV Hell, which was a collection of the worst TV programmes ever. Since then he has presented television shows such as Win, Lose or Draw, Pets Win Prizes and TV Heroes, which was a series of 10-minute homages to some of Baker's entertainment idols including Fanny Cradock, Peter Glaze (from Crackerjack) and the Top of the Pops audience. The episode on the Top of the Pops audience includes a clip of Baker leaping around to a performance of "Ooh What A Life" by the Gibson Brothers in 1979, captioned as "Danny Baker's first TV appearance".

Baker also began a BBC Saturday night chat show, called Danny Baker After All which borrowed its style from Late Night with David Letterman, but his style and guests (Rick Wakeman of prog rock band Yes was a regular) did not attract the mainstream audience the slot demanded. Film critic Mark Kermode's band the Railtown Bottlers were the show's house band.

Later he fronted television adverts for Daz washing powder and Mars bar confectionery. Baker parodied his Daz ads by appearing as himself on the sitcom Me, You and Him.

During this period, Baker began presenting on BBC Radio 5's 606 football-related phone-in programme as well as the job of presenting Match of the Eighties, a six-part BBC series of football during the 1980/81 and 1985/86 seasons.

Baker was a writer on Chris Evans' TFI Friday show, as well as contributing material for presenters such as Angus Deayton and Jonathan Ross.

==== Guest appearances (late 1990s–2000s) ====
During the late 1990s he made guest appearances on comedy shows including Have I Got News for You, Shooting Stars and Room 101. During this period he appeared in the press as a result of nights out with friends Chris Evans and England footballer Paul Gascoigne. Gascoigne was under media scrutiny for drinking and socialising while preparing for tournaments. After Gascoigne was left out of the 1998 World Cup squad, Baker went on Have I Got News for You to defend his friend and criticise the omission.

He also appeared on The Terry and Gaby Show from 2003 to 2004 (where he burnt his hand trying to perform a trick with a microwave and a piece of soap) and has appeared on BBC Two quiz show QI, becoming the show's first ever winner. Baker worked again with Charles Shaar Murray on the Ramones documentary End of the Century: The Story of the Ramones, providing an audio commentary.

More recent TV projects include The Sitcom Showdown which began on UKTV Gold in April 2006, a 2014 show featuring archived television footage for BBC4 named Brushing Up On... and a music discussion show for BBC4 named Danny Baker's Rockin' Decades. He also did Comic Relief Does The Apprentice in 2007 for Comic Relief. He also performed in The Rocky Horror Show, as the narrator, at the Churchill Theatre in Bromley and the New Wimbledon Theatre.

Baker was announced as part of BT Sport's football coverage in 2013, hosting a Friday evening show with Danny Kelly. In 2016, Chris Evans hired Baker to work as a writer on the 2016 series of Top Gear. In November 2016, he entered as a latecomer in reality television show, I'm a Celebrity...Get Me Out Of Here. Baker was the first person to be voted off in the series.

=== Radio career ===
==== BBC Radio London/5 Live/BBC Radio 1 (1989–1997) ====
Baker began his radio career on BBC Radio London in 1989, presenting Weekend Breakfast from 6 to 9 am on Saturdays and Sundays. The show was produced by Chris Evans, who became a good friend to Baker. With GLR eventually opting for a more orthodox breakfast show at weekends, Baker moved to the 10 am to 1 pm slot on Sundays.

In 1990, Baker joined the newly launched BBC Radio 5, presenting Sportscall, a phone-in sports quiz broadcast every Saturday lunchtime.

From October 1991 to October 1992 he presented 606 and, from February 1992 until October 1993, he presented Morning Edition every weekday morning. The show blended Baker's love of unusual trivia with "grown-up" music. This was where Baker first teamed up with Danny Kelly and Allis Moss. Mark Kermode added weekly film reviews, and would later appear with his band the Railtown Bottlers every week on the first series of Baker's TV show.

Baker joined BBC Radio 1 in October 1993, taking over the weekend mid-morning show from 10 am to 1 pm from Dave Lee Travis, who had resigned on air following the sackings instigated by Matthew Bannister and Trevor Dann during the early 1990s. However, due to poor ratings, from November 1994 he was heard on Saturdays only from 10 am to 12 noon. Simon Mayo took over Sunday mornings. Baker's style led to a fall in listeners at Radio 1 but despite his tendering his resignation on at least two occasions, management added extensions to his contract. From October 1995, his Saturday show went out from 12:30 to 2:30 pm. He left the station in September 1996. His co-hosts during this period included BBC continuity announcer Danny Kelly.

While continuing with his Saturday morning show on Radio 1, in 1996 Baker joined BBC Radio 5 Live to present a Sunday lunchtime show with Danny Kelly, Baker & Kelly Upfront.

On leaving Radio 1, Baker returned to Radio London to present a three-hour Sunday show from 10 am to 1 pm. Baker and Kelly Upfront also returned, now at Saturday lunchtime, while Baker also took on a new show, The Baker Line, a Wednesday evening version of the 606 phone-in show.

While Baker and Kelly Upfront was light-hearted, The Baker Line was darker and emotionally charged. Baker was at his most outspoken, and in early 1997 he was dismissed from Radio 5 Live when station bosses alleged that he had incited threatening behaviour during an angry outburst about a referee.

==== Talk Radio/Virgin Radio (1997–2000) ====
In June 1997, Baker joined Talk Radio UK to present a similar football phone-in with Kelly each Saturday from 5:30 to 7:30 pm. A pre-match show was added from 11:30 am to 1 pm. Baker moved to the Saturday breakfast slot (8 am to 12 noon) in January 1999 but engineered his own dismissal after a matter of weeks by refusing to centre the show on football, preferring to intersperse chat with his own music selections.

After leaving Talk Radio UK, he joined Virgin Radio in early 1999, taking over from Jonathan Ross on Sundays from 10 am to 1 pm.

Not long after, Baker was approached by the BBC and was asked whether he wanted to present a Saturday morning show on BBC Radio 2, which at the time was being hosted by Steve Wright. (Wright was being promoted to the station's Weekday Afternoon slot). Baker turned down the offer by saying "the time wasn't right", and the show was given to Jonathan Ross. Baker also deputised on Virgin's Saturday lunchtime football show from 12 noon to 2 pm for a handful of shows alongside Danny Kelly until he left the station in 2000.

==== BBC London 94.9 (September 2001 – May 2005 and October 2005 – November 2012) ====
In September 2001, Baker joined BBC London 94.9 presenting a Saturday morning show from 8 to 11 am. Just six months later, in March 2002, and with a new co-presenting team which included Amy Lamé, Mark O'Donnell and David Kuo, he took over the breakfast show from 6 to 9 am, with a new theme tune in the form of the Anthony Newley song The Candy Man.

Although not drawing a large listenership, Baker won "Sony Radio DJ of the year" for the show. However, the day after winning the award, he announced his intention to leave the show at the end of the month. The last show was on Friday 27 May 2005. On Monday 17 October 2005, after a sabbatical at home, Baker rejoined BBC London 94.9, where he took over the weekday 3 to 5 pm show from Jono Coleman, who had moved to co-present the breakfast show with former actress JoAnne Good.

His BBC London 94.9 shows tended to feature off-the-wall phone-ins, toast and discussions with his on-air team, Amy Lamé and Baylen Leonard, often regarding music and entertainment nostalgia of the 1960s and 1970s. His interviews focused on offbeat trivia rather than the guests' latest or most famous work, and shows would be interspersed with relatively obscure rock tracks from bands such as Yes, Todd Rundgren, Steely Dan, Frank Zappa and Captain Beefheart.

The programme was axed in November 2012 as part of a programme of cuts at the station. Although due to continue its run until the end of the year, Baker announced on air on the day of the announcement that that day's show would be his last, branding his BBC London employers as "pinheaded weasels" for the way in which they cancelled the programme.

==== All Day Breakfast Show podcasts (2007) ====
On 15 March 2007 until September the same year, Baker hosted the All Day Breakfast Show, a podcast to reach listeners beyond BBC London's FM radio reach. Regulars Amy Lamé, Baylen Leonard and David Kuo all contributed and the first show featured an appearance by comedian and actor Peter Kay.

Created by and starring Danny Baker, the show also featured Amy Lamé, Baylen Leonard and David Kuo. It followed a similar format to Baker's radio show on BBC London, where the listeners and presenters share humorous anecdotes, interspersed with obscure recordings.

Originally launched in March 2007, the All Day Breakfast Show was rebranded in September that year as the All Day Breakfast Show in Colour, and a weekly download fee of £2 was applied to the podcast. The full-length podcast was made available solely through Wippit and edited highlights were made available as a teaser through iTunes.

The podcast went into hiatus after one week, numerous downloaders from Wippit being unable to access the material due to restrictions on available bandwidth. No official announcement was made for the cause of the hiatus, or whether the podcast would return. However, after several weeks of silence, the All Day Breakfast Show officially announced its return to the air on the 19 October 2007. No announcement on the main website was given, but in a five-minute mini-show downloadable initially only to paid subscribers, Baker and Leonard announced the return of the show. They confirmed that from "next week" they would be broadcasting three times a week. They also suggested (possibly only partially in jest) that due to BBC cuts announced the previous day, that they may be planning to end their official BBC London show and move to being an "internet only" show. The mini show also introduced a new recording of the Candyman theme tune.

On Saturday 15 December 2007 Baker posted an open letter on both the ADBS and Baker and Kelly sites, saying that "there will be no more All Day Breakfast Shows nor Baker & Kelly's. There has now been an irreversible and utter breakdown between the on-air team and the company who have, with varying degrees of success, provided it to you online."

Wippit responded on 17 December 2007 saying that the show's cancellation was due to "a breakdown in contract negotiations between our company and Danny Baker", alleging that Baker "did not wish to meet his agreed obligations regarding exclusivity", and Wippit rejected the terms proposed by his agent. Wippit offered Baker 100% of the programme's revenues and declared no further interest in the podcast, but this offer was rejected by Baker's agent.

==== Return to 606, BBC Radio 2 and Saturday show (2008–2019) ====
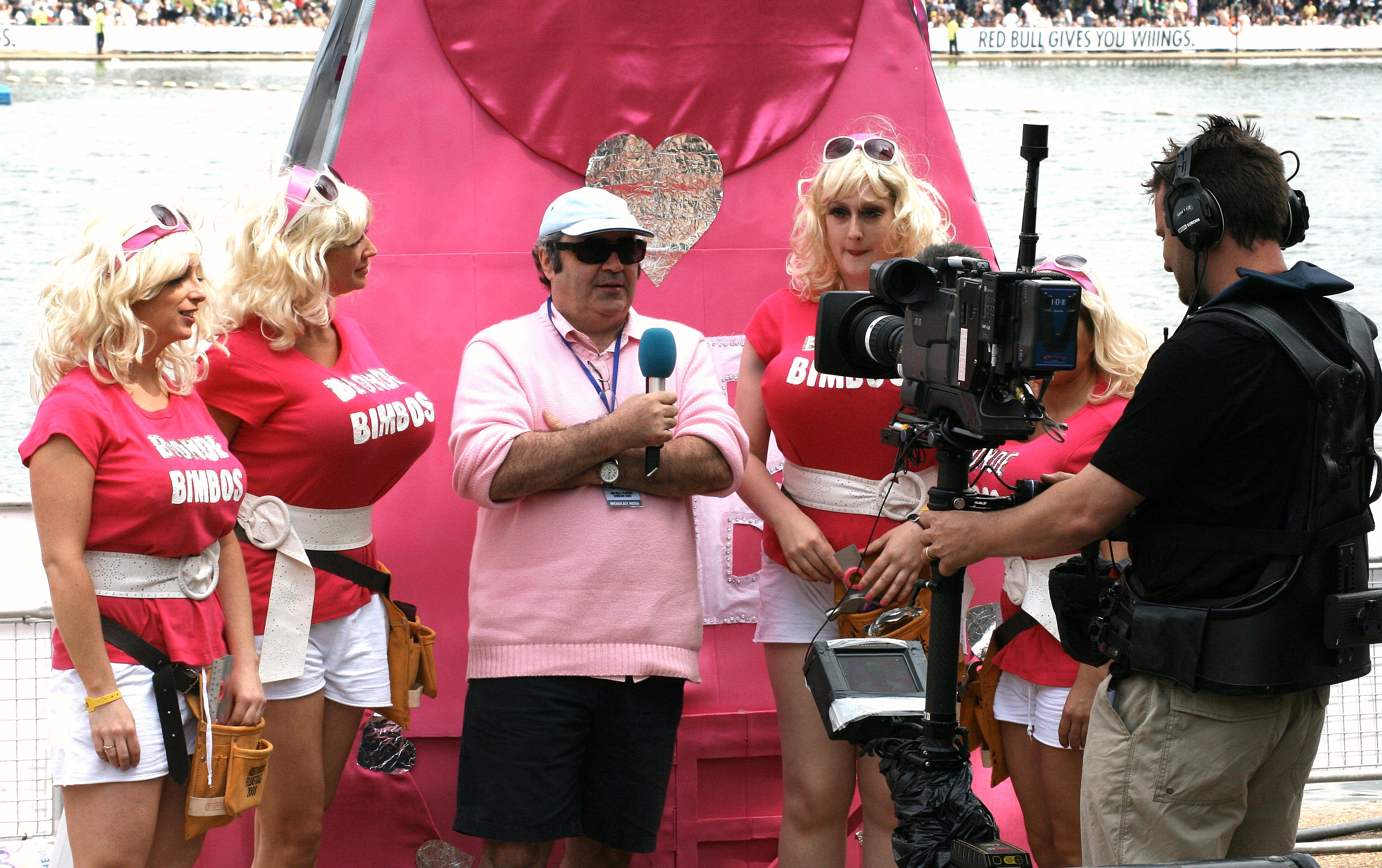
Danny Baker at Flugtag, London, 2010

Having announced on his BBC London radio show on 21 May 2008 that he would be returning to present Radio 5 Live's 606 football phone-in for a limited period that summer, Baker hosted six shows during Euro 2008. He made a long-term return to 606 in September 2008, hosting a Tuesday night show for the duration of the 2008–09 football season. He also had a short stint with Zoe Ball on Radio 2 on Saturday mornings after Jonathan Ross had been suspended for three months by the BBC. At the end of the 2008–09 season, Baker's 606 Tuesday night show that he co-hosted with Issy Clarke shifted to an expanded Saturday morning slot, starting in September 2009 on 5 Live. The show returned in September 2010 after the summer break with Lynsey Hipgrave replacing Clarke as co-host. The Saturday morning show gained critical acclaim, winning the Gold Sony Radio Award in the Speech Radio Personality of the Year award for 2011, 2012 and 2014, and the Gold Award for the Entertainment Show of the Year in 2013.

==== Lineker & Baker: Behind Closed Doors (2018–2020) ====
Between November 2018 and March 2020 Baker co-hosted 35 episodes of a podcast titled Lineker & Baker: Behind Closed Doors with Gary Lineker and described as "a regular show full of the intimate details of life in and around the game".

==== Sacking by the BBC (2019) ====
In attempting to lampoon privilege and the news cycle I went to a file of goofy pictures and saw the chimp dressed as a Lord and thought, 'That's the one!' Had I kept searching I might have chosen General Tom Thumb or even a baby in a crown. But I didn't. God knows I wish [I] had... Minutes later I was alerted by followers that this royal baby was of course mixed race and waves of panic and revulsion washed over me... What had I done?... It was a genuine, naive and catastrophic mistake.

— Baker's response to the racism incident, 2019

In May 2019, Baker posted an image on Twitter of a couple holding hands with a chimpanzee dressed in clothes. He had added the caption: "Royal Baby leaves hospital," referring to the recent birth of Archie Mountbatten-Windsor, son of Prince Harry, Duke of Sussex and Meghan, Duchess of Sussex. Baker was subject to a backlash on social media, accused of mocking the Duchess of Sussex's African-American heritage with the tweet. Baker deleted the tweet and apologised, stating that he had made a "naive and catastrophic mistake" with his choice of image, but denied racist intent. He stated that the choice of a chimpanzee "dressed as a Lord" had been made "to lampoon privilege". The BBC sacked Baker, maintaining that he had made a "serious error in judgement" that went against the values of the station. Baker expressed disagreement with the BBC's decision to fire him, receiving support from several media figures.

==== The Treehouse (since 2019) ====
In November 2019 Baker launched a twice-weekly podcast entitled The Treehouse co-hosted by Louise Pepper. The format is a continuation of previous non-football radio shows being based upon humorous stories from listeners, often relating to pop culture. From August 2020, the podcast moved to a paid-only subscription model on Patreon.

== Other ventures ==
=== Football videos ===
Baker has presented a number of popular football videos and DVDs including Own Goals and Gaffs (1992), Right Hammerings, Whose Season Was It Anyway? (both 1993), Own Goals and Gaffs 2 (1994), Fabulous World Of Freak Football (1995) and The Glorious Return Of Own Goals And Gaffs (2009).

The Game (1990), a television show presented by Baker, following bottom-division East London Sunday League football teams, was released on DVD through Revelation Films on 24 May 2010.

=== Books ===
==== Football ====
In 2009, he released a book co-written with Danny Kelly entitled Classic Football Debates Settled Once and for All, Vol. 1. Despite the title, the book itself makes clear that a sequel is not planned, though some extra material was written for the paperback edition, released to coincide with the 2010 World Cup.

In 2019, he released a book co-written with Gary Lineker based on their podcast Lineker & Baker: Behind Closed Doors.

==== Autobiography ====
On 6 November 2012, Baker released an autobiography, Going to Sea in a Sieve. which was first published by Weidenfeld & Nicolson. A second volume entitled Going Off Alarming was published on 25 September 2014. A third volume entitled Going on the Turn was published on 5 October 2017.

The sitcom Cradle to Grave was based on Going to Sea in a Sieve, and was released in September 2015.

== Personal life ==
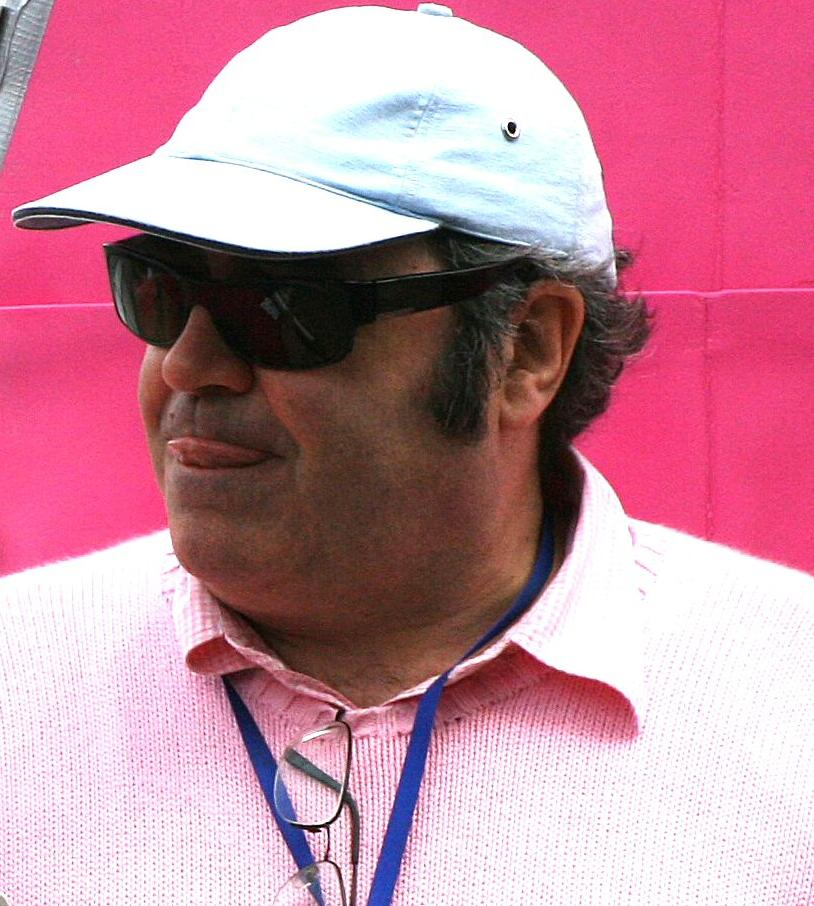
Baker in 2010

Baker married his wife Wendy in 1988. They have three children. They live in Blackheath, south east London.

On 1 November 2010, Baker announced that he had been diagnosed with cancer and would start chemotherapy instantly and radiotherapy in January. On 14 June 2011 he announced that he had been given the all clear.

Janet Street-Porter described Baker as "over-hasty, excitable, [and] a blabbermouth", whose "motor mouth was legendary, even back in the 1980s." She noted that his "pet obsessions" were "working class humour" and football.

Baker is a supporter of his local football club, Millwall. He was a renowned record collector until 2024, when he put his extensive collection up for auction.

== Politics ==
Baker has been a lifelong Labour Party voter. In May 2017, he endorsed Labour Party leader Jeremy Corbyn in the upcoming general election.

== Reception ==
In 2019 after the BBC dismissed Baker, the corporation issued a statement describing him as "a brilliant broadcaster". The Guardian noted that he was a "pioneer of the inclusive, personable, and at times eccentric, broadcasting style that has since become the norm," and that he "has the knack of effortlessly making both the phone-in caller and the listener feel as if they are in his studio."

Janet Street-Porter stated that Baker's pride in his working-class London identity proved popular among a "large section of the population who feel they don't get a voice on 'posh' channels". She added that he stood out while working for the BBC, a corporation where "the over-educated and middle class dominates" and where, despite attempts to increase ethnic minority and LGBT representation, "white working-class people" remained "conspicuously absent".
