= UK Radio Aid =

2005 British radio charity event

UK Radio AID was a charitable event in the United Kingdom held on Monday 17 January 2005 to raise money for the Disasters Emergency Committee (DEC) appeal for the victims of the Asian tsunami.

== Format ==
The event consisted of a twelve-hour radio show broadcast on 268 radio stations with an audience of over 20 million, covering all of the UK's commercial stations including national stations Classic FM and Virgin Radio, as well as several student and hospital stations plus overseas stations such as BFBS. Over £3 million was raised during the broadcast

Reading 107 and Splash FM were amongst a small number of commercial radio stations not to take this show, and instead kept local programming. Talksport continued their cricket coverage but regularly updated people on how to donate and how much money was raised.

== Presenters ==
The shows were presented by a variety of celebrity DJs and guests, with live performances and interviews. Many celebrities and companies offered items for auction on eBay; Prime Minister Tony Blair donated a guided tour of 10 Downing Street, Chris Evans agreed that the highest bidder would be his guest at the BRIT Awards, and Frank Skinner donated a shirt worn by Elvis.

== Guests ==
Singers who sang live in the studio include Jamie Cullum, Liam Gallagher, David Gray, Jamelia, Texas, Ronan Keating, Bryan Adams, Il Divo, Melanie C, and Russell Watson. Comedy was provided by Jon Culshaw, Avid Merrion, Ricky Gervais, Matt Lucas and David Walliams.

== Theme song ==
The theme song for the day was a specially recorded version of The Beatles' "Come Together" recorded by Paul Weller.

== Timetable ==
The shows during the day were presented by the following presenters, with some of the principal guests given in parentheses.

- 06:00-08:00: Davina McCall, Dermot O'Leary
- 08:00-10:00: Chris Evans, Kate Thornton (Tony Blair)
- 10:00-12:00: Simon Bates (Frank Skinner, Jade Goody)
- 12:00-14:00: Zoë Ball, Shane Richie (Jason Donovan)
- 14:00-16:00: Mark Goodier, Tony Blackburn (Sharon Osbourne)
- 16:00-18:00: Johnny Vaughan, Liza Tarbuck (Prince Andrew)
