= Unreal TV =

Unreal TV is an Australian television show showcasing advertisements and weird video footage. It was hosted by Tim Ferguson and lasted from 1999 to 2001.
