= Wendy Mooney =

Australian TV presenter

- Born: South Africa
- Occupation: Actress

Wendy Mooney is an Australian TV presenter and actress. She was nominated for Most Popular New Talent at the 1996 Logie Awards for her work in the Nine Network TV series Don't Forget Your Toothbrush.

Mooney was the co-host, with Tim Ferguson, of the 1995 Australian version of Don't Forget Your Toothbrush, the co-host, with Peter Rowsthorn and Fiona MacGregor, of Gonged But Not Forgotten (Nine Network) and the host of Blockbuster Entertainment Show (Network Ten). She was Richard Stubbs's co host on Triple M's breakfast show.

On stage she has appeared in 1998's Countdown the Musical and in the 2002 musical I Should Be Lucky
