= Little Aussie Battlers =

- Genre: Game Show
- Presented by: Tim Ferguson
- Country of origin: Australia
- Original language: English
- No. of series: 1
- No. of episodes: 1

Production
- Running time: 30 Min.

Original release
- Network: Nine Network
- Release: 1998 – 1998

Little Aussie Battlers is an Australian television game show that was broadcast on Nine Network Australia on 10 February 1998. It was hosted by Tim Ferguson and was a pilot for a possible series.

Little Aussie Battlers saw three groups of three children competing at different challenges. 10 Month old babies competed in the Not So Grand Prix and Spaghetti Darts, four-year-olds in Nappy Ever After and Advanced Driving and seven-year-olds in Disaster Mind, Have I Got News for You and H2O Slammers. The production team had spent 10 months inventing and experimenting with children's games for the show.

== Reception ==
Tony Squires in The Sydney Morning Herald called it a debacle and said "The only vaguely interesting moment was when one of the small fry in the event involving babies throwing spaghetti from their high chairs covered the camera with a handful of the stuff." Garry Maddox in The Sydney Morning Herald's The Guide gave it a thumbs down and wrote "Heard of the Winter Olympics? This is the Witless Olympics." In the Age Debi Enker called it a "depressing experience."

Child Health Council of SA chairwoman Elizabeth Puddy criticised the show and wrote "We believe it is unacceptable and highly inappropriate to televise a program whose sole aim is to amuse others through the loss of dignity of another human being. This is made more problematic by the inability of participants, particularly the babies, to make an effective choice about whether or not to participate." Young Media Australia Adelaide executive director Barbara Biggins was also critical. "This and other programs of the same ilk, such as Australia's Funniest Home Video Show, which set up children for accidents, frights, messes and to make fools of themselves all for "adult" enjoyment, don't appear to contravene TV program standards, they just offend against standards of common decency to children." Nine program development director David Lyle defended the show saying "There were no children insulted or made fun of," "Much of the joke – and you can decide if it worked – was about sending up adults' conventions and seeing how silly they are when you put children in their place."
