= Tim Ferguson =

Australian comedian and writer

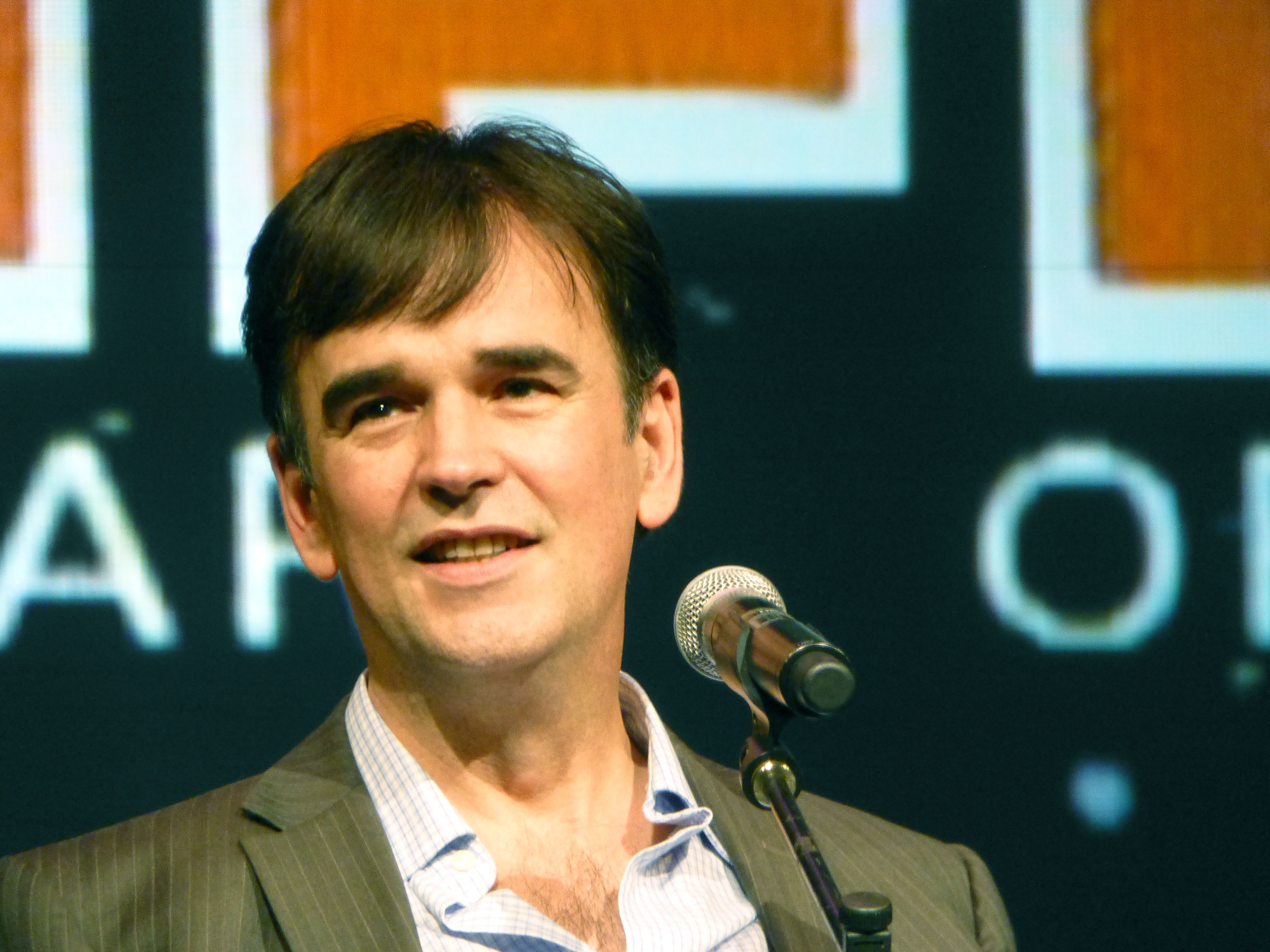
- Tim Ferguson at the DAAS Kapital DVD launch, April 2013
- Born: Timothy Dorcen Langbene Ferguson; 16 November 1963 (age 62); Sydney, New South Wales, Australia
- Occupations: Television presenter; radio presenter; comedian; film director; author; screenwriting teacher
- Years active: 1984−present
- Known for: Don't Forget Your Toothbrush; Doug Anthony All Stars
- Spouse: Stephanie Mills (2012–present)
- Musical career
- Instruments: Vocals, keyboards, piano
- Website: www.cheekymonkeycomedy.com

Timothy Dorcen Langbene Ferguson (born 16 November 1963) is an Australian comedian, film director, screenwriter, author and screenwriting teacher.

== Early life and education ==
Timothy Dorcen Langbene Ferguson grew up in Singapore, and later on a rural property near the town of Perthville, New South Wales. He is the son of Tony Ferguson, who was a Vietnam War correspondent, the first reporter to release news of the Tet Offensive to the world media. Tony became executive producer of This Day Tonight and Four Corners at the Australian Broadcasting Corporation, and network liaison for the ABC's managing director, David Hill.

Tim spent three years at All Saints College, Bathurst, before moving to Canberra, where he attended the radical free-school School Without Walls and Narrabundah College.

== Early career ==
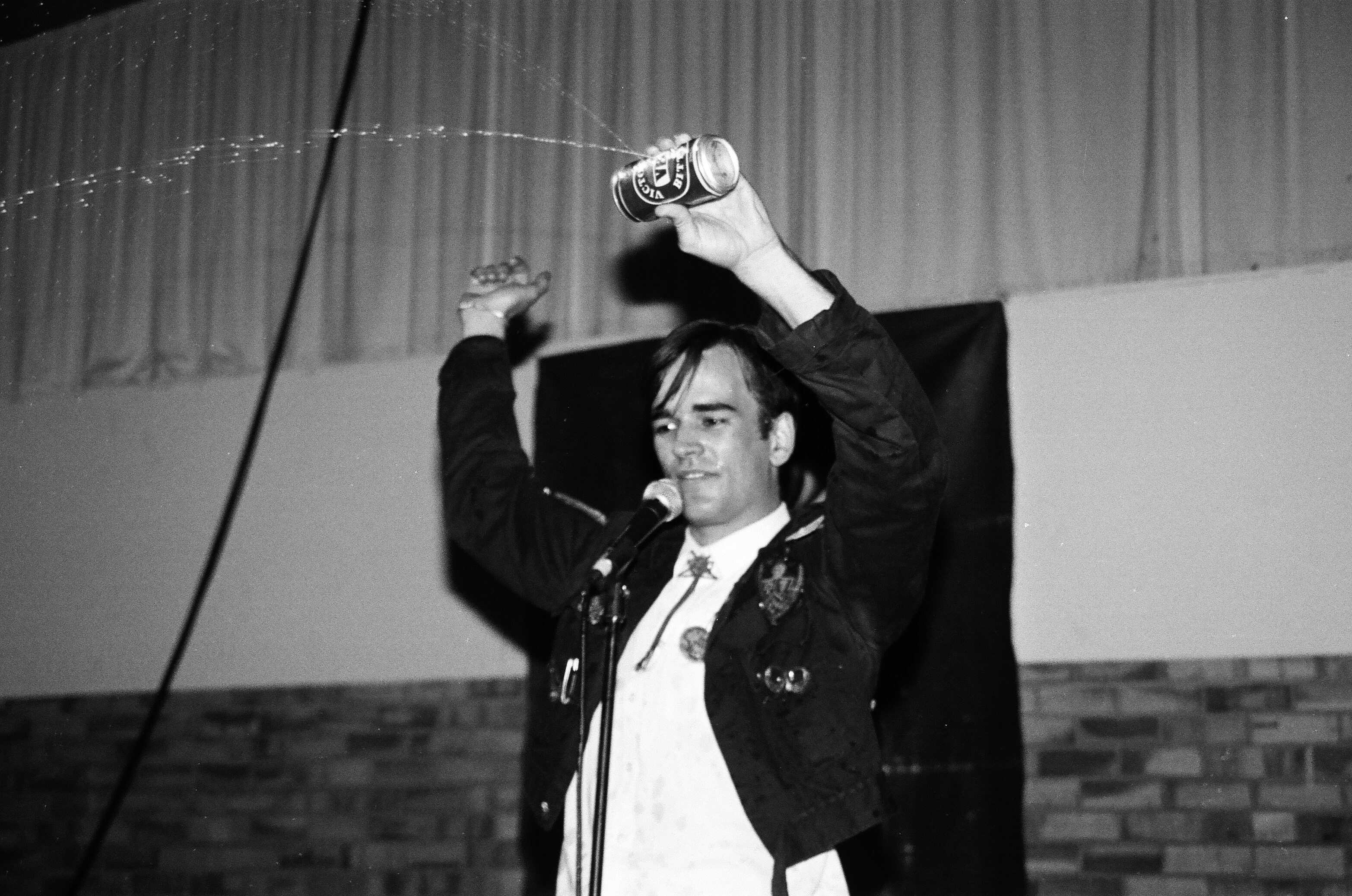
Ferguson performing with the Doug Anthony All Stars in 1994.

Ferguson's first major appearance was as a member of the musical comedy trio Doug Anthony All Stars, along with Richard Fidler and Paul McDermott, on the UK Channel 4 television show Friday Night Live, Viva Cabaret, 'DAAS Love' (BBC), where they quickly gained a following. DAAS starred in Australian comedy television show, The Big Gig. This was soon followed by their sci-fi sitcom DAAS Kapital.

In 1995–96, Ferguson appeared in Funky Squad on ABC Television.

In 1995 he co-hosted, with Wendy Mooney, the Logie Award-winning series Don't Forget Your Toothbrush on the Nine Network. In 1998 he hosted the pilot for Little Aussie Battlers.

Ferguson's novel, Left, Right and Centre: A Tale of Greed, Sex and Power was published by Penguin in 1997.

Ferguson starred in Australian commercials advertising the video game console Nintendo 64.

He co-wrote and hosted eight series and twelve one-hour specials of his comedy clip show Unreal TV.

He was creator, co-writer and co-producer of the sitcom Shock Jock with Marc Gracie and Chris Thompson.

Ferguson wrote a comedic alternative to the Australian Constitution Preamble, published by The Sydney Morning Herald in 1999, ending with the words "We are girt by sea and pissed by lunchtime. And even though we might seem a racist, closed-minded, sports-obsessed little People, at least we're better than the Kiwis. Now bugger off, we're sleeping".

== 2000 onwards ==
=== Film ===
Ferguson is co-director (with Marc Gracie) of the feature film Spin Out. Spin Out is a romantic comedy based at a Bachelor and Spinster Ball. Ferguson co-wrote the movie with Edwina Exton. Producers: Marc Gracie & David Redman. Spin Out follows a slow-burning attraction between two long-time friends, Billy (Xavier Samuel) and Lucy (Morgan Griffin). The movie is based at a Ute Muster and B&S Ball. Spin Out was shot in Shepparton in August 2015. Sony Pictures Releasing, which has worldwide rights, released the film in cinemas in 2016.

In 2017, Ferguson co-wrote the feature film The BBQ starring Shane Jacobson, Julia Zemiro and Magda Szubanski.

He starred as himself in the movie That's Not My Dog! with Paul Hogan, Shane Jacobson and Emily Taheny.

He appeared in the movie Fat Pizza as the magician David Cockerfield and in multiple seasons of Fat Pizza: Back in Business as Julian Bousage.

=== Comedy ===
In 2021, Ferguson launched the standup comedy show Smashing Life - Motivation For Idiots at Adelaide Fringe Festival.

In 2018/21, Ferguson launched his record-breaking live solo show 'Fast Life On Wheels'. He toured Australia to sell-out festival theatres, raising awareness for employment and housing for people with disabilities. The show continues to tour US, UK in 2022.

In 2014, Ferguson joined Paul McDermott and Paul Livingston to reform the Doug Anthony All Stars with Livingston replacing Richard Fidler as the group's guitarist.

DAAS won the Edinburgh Festival Spirit Of The Fringe Award in 2016.

DAAS performed sell-out Edinburgh Festival and London seasons at Soho Theatre & the Shepherds Bush Empire in 2016–17. Ferguson still tours internationally with the reformed Doug Anthony Allstars (DAAS).

He played the role of Frankenfurter in the long-running The Rocky Horror Show, directed by Nigel Triffit.

In 2014, Ferguson teamed up with Maynard to start a podcast named Bunga Bunga. Bunga Bunga won the Castaway Best Comedy Podcast Award in 2017.

In 2012 he toured his live standup comedy show "Carry a Big Stick", featuring tales and songs from his life on the 'comedy warpath'. The title alludes to his experiencing multiple sclerosis, and the need to use a walking stick.

=== Teaching ===
From 2016 until 2018, Ferguson taught comedy screenwriting at New York University (NYU Sydney). He has also taught comedy screenwriting at the Screen Academy Scotland, Sydney University, Victorian College of the Arts and Sydney Film School.

Ferguson was a sessional lecturer in Screenwriting and Writing TV Comedy at RMIT University, the Australian Film, Television and Radio School (AFTRS).

=== Writing/producing ===
Ferguson published The Cheeky Monkey-Writing Narrative Comedy (published by Currency Press), a comedy writing manual for screenwriters, playwrights, and authors. The book offers "a revolutionary approach to comedy writing" and features methods for comic story & character development.

Ferguson writes The Ferguson Report, a weekly satirical column in The New Daily newspaper with over 1.7 million subscribers.

Ferguson was Series Script Editor for the ABCTV sitcom Ricketts Lane starring Sammy J & Randy.

He produced and co-wrote the orchestral performance piece Billie & The Dinosaurs with Chris Thompson & composer Geoff Willis. Its premiere performance was at the Australian Museum in 2017. Subsequent shows and tours, produced by Marc Gracie, are ongoing.

In 2017, Ferguson co-wrote the feature film The BBQ starring Shane Jacobson and Magda Szubanski.

You can do stand-up comedy or you can do sit-down comedy.

— Tim Ferguson, on performing with multiple sclerosis.

Ferguson's autobiography Carry a Big Stick: A Life of Laughter, Friendship and MS was published by Hachette in September 2013. It features the stories of his childhood, life as an international touring comedian, network TV celebrity, comedy feature film & sitcom writer, and comedy screenwriting lecturer. It also presents him with a way of overcoming the challenges of multiple sclerosis (MS).

In 2001, Ferguson branched out into production when he created the TV1 comedy series Shock Jock.

In 2003, he hosted a talk-back radio show on 3AK and hosted Big Brother Australia 2003's Big Brother The Insider.

In 2010, Ferguson was executive producer with Marc Gracie, writer and host of the independent tonight show WTF – With Tim Ferguson on C31 Melbourne. WTF is directed by Marc Gracie (Full Frontal, Unreal TV).

Ferguson was script producer for the AWGIE-nominated web series Forgettherules. He co-wrote and hosted eight series and multiple one-hour specials of Network Ten's Unreal TV and Foxtel's long-running sci-fi fan-show Space Cadets.

=== Art ===
Ferguson's artworks (known as "Tim Awt") were featured in various Sydney exhibitions in January 2018, curated by Australian art legend, Damien Minton.

He held exhibitions in Sydney 2019 - 2024 with artists Gretel Killeen and Paul Livingston.

Ferguson's works have toured extensively and appeared in publications in Australia and Britain.

=== Other roles ===
Ferguson is Ambassador for The Human Rights Commission for Disability and Ambassador for IncludeAbility, a resource for employers and people with disability.

He is a patron of MS Australia, and an ambassador for Pandis, a not-for-profit initiative investigating environmental pathogenic microbes in chronic disease.

He is patron of Music for Canberra, an organisation supporting Canberra's music education and performance.

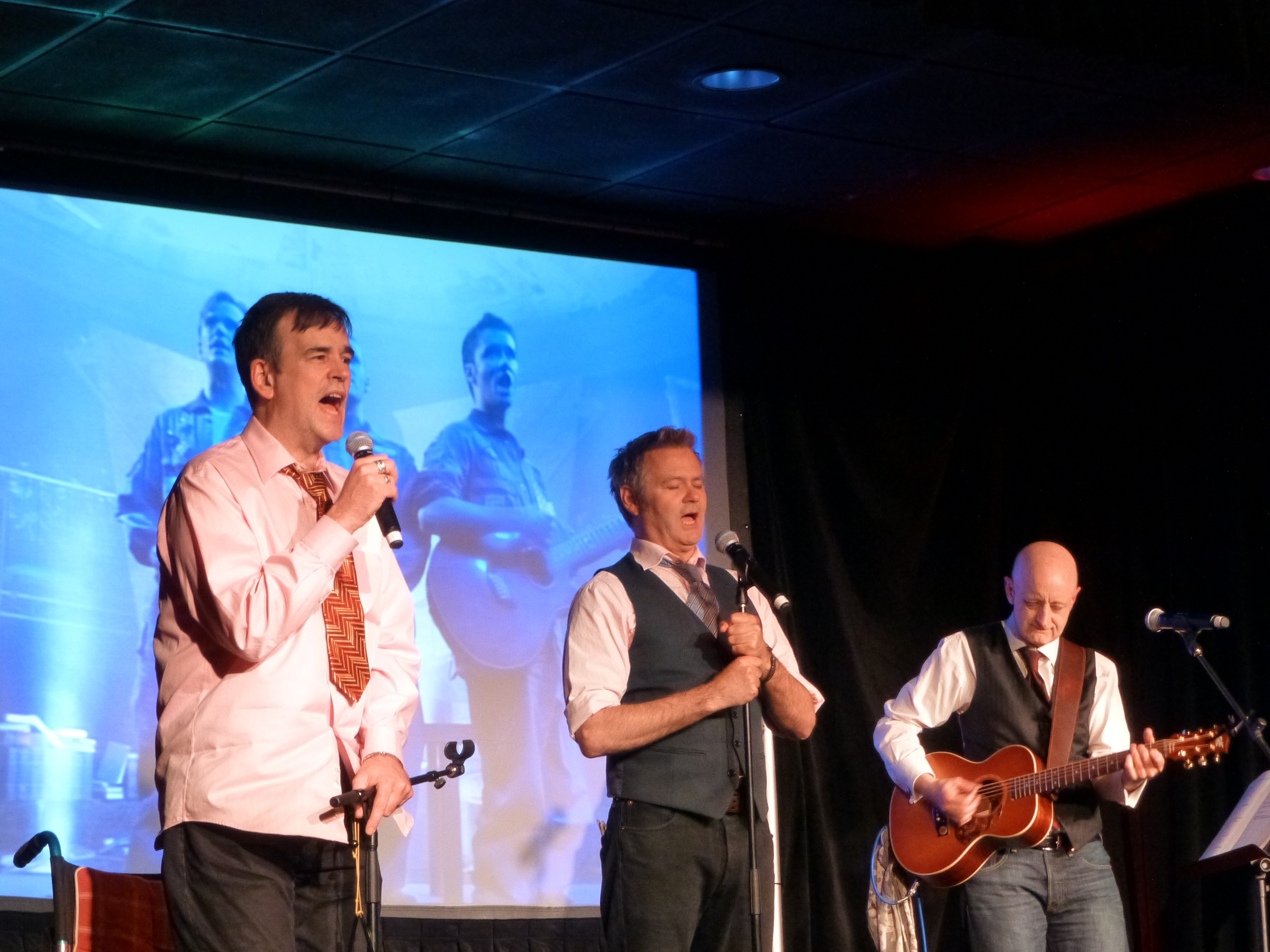
Ferguson (left) performing with the reformed Doug Anthony All-Stars in 2014.

Along with former members of DAAS, Ferguson featured in an ABC documentary called Tick F***ing Tock, concerning the ravages caused to his life and health, and the impacts on those close to him, owing to his multiple sclerosis.

== Personal life ==
Ferguson announced on an episode of Good News Week in 2010 that he has multiple sclerosis (MS), which required him to occasionally use a walking cane. Ferguson has experienced MS symptoms since the age of 19. His show at the 2012 Melbourne International Comedy Festival was called "Carry a Big Stick", an allusion to his MS. Ferguson's condition has since progressed further and he now uses a wheelchair.

He owns the third largest Star Wars toy collection in the southern hemisphere.

On 22 March 2017, Ferguson featured on Julia Zemiro's Home Delivery, with host Julia Zemiro taking him on a tour of his childhood home and schools in Bathurst and Canberra.

In December 2017, Ferguson and co-host Maynard recorded a live charity show of their Castaway Award-winning podcast, 'Bunga Bunga', called 'A Very Bunga Christmas' to a huge crowd of fans at the Harold Park Hotel in Sydney. He has spoken out for young Australians with MS and other disabilities living in aged care. He campaigns to arrange more appropriate options for them.

In 2017, Ferguson hosted the South West Disability Expo, helping thousands of South West Sydney residents with disabilities gain greater control over their lives and engage the most suitable services in their area to meet their individual needs.

Ferguson supports the Summer Foundation (Building Better Lives). Established in 2006, the key aim of the Summer Foundation is to change human service policy and practice related to young people in nursing homes.

In 2021, Ferguson became a leading campaigner for Building Better Homes, an initiative for a national building code of mandatory accessibility standards. The campaign was successful in creating new building codes nationwide.

His work fundraising and raising awareness is ongoing for motor neuron disease, multiple sclerosis, cerebral palsy and acquired brain injury conditions.

Ferguson hosts the Uniting Church podcast featuring people with disabilities including Down syndrome, vision impairment, cerebral palsy, autism and Asperger syndrome.

In February 2018, Ferguson apologised via his management to TV critic Candace Sutton for a series of abusive letters containing numerous rude remarks, faxed to her in 1990, with cartoons drawn by him.

Ferguson launched the MS Australia Connections Hub in May 2020. The online hub provides people with MS, their families and carers with tips and advice for living with the condition. People are invited to add their own perspectives and tips on the website. Ferguson's lighthearted tips are featured, including "Physio, Physio, Physio, chocolate and Physio!" and "Homeopathy is not a thing".

Ferguson regularly speaks at public and corporate events about disability, housing, social services, and health at events. His most regular keynote speech themes are inclusivity, positivity, and overcoming challenges.

== Political candidacy ==
In the 1990 Australian federal election, Ferguson stood as an independent candidate for the seat of Kooyong, against the Leader of the Opposition, Andrew Peacock. Following a "Vote For Tim" campaign conducted by the Allstars on The Big Gig, he gained 3.7% of the vote.

On the ABC's Q&A program on 4 May 2013, Ferguson announced his candidacy for the Australian Senate in the 2013 Australian federal election. He said that he would have no policies and that he wanted someone for whom he could vote. Ferguson nominated for the Senate for New South Wales, as a member of the Senator Online party.
