= Stars in Fast Cars =

- Starring: Dougie Anderson
- Country of origin: United Kingdom
- Original language: English
- No. of episodes: 10 (plus pilot)

Production
- Running time: 30 minutes

Original release
- Network: BBC Two
- Release: 10 July 2004
- Network: BBC Three
- Release: 25 September 2005 – 20 January 2006

Stars in Fast Cars is a motoring-themed celebrity game show, in which celebrities compete in "a series of Wacky Races-esque events to become the fastest star-in-a-car." The series was first broadcast on BBC Three, in 2005, and repeated on BBC One in 2006.

Among some of the more notable moments were Car Skittles; a stunt where the guests had to drive on to the back of a moving lorry, before letting them all drive a Ferrari – with a bathtub of water attached to the back which they were not allowed to spill. They were asked to race in a variety of motor-esque machines, from the aforementioned armchairs to Formula 1 cars.

The final round of each show, between the two top-ranking guests, features the use of the car cannon in attempts to hit various things.

The show originated as a one-off special of the popular BBC Two show, Top Gear, and was produced, as were a number of other television specials, in aid of charity Comic Relief for Sport Relief in 2004. It was later turned into a series, presented by Dougie Anderson.

== Episodes and participants ==
This list is incomplete (episodes 3-10 are missing). You can help Wikipedia by adding verifiable data to it.

=== Pilot ===
The Top Gear special feature for Sport Relief, first broadcast on 10 July 2004.

The pilot was presented by Top Gear presenters Richard Hammond and James May, with Jeremy Clarkson amongst the "stars" competing. The special featured a rare appearance on New Top Gear from Fifth Gear's Tiff Needell.

Results:

- 1st = : Jodie Kidd
- 1st = : Jeremy Clarkson
- 3rd = : Alan Davies
- 4th = : Jimmy "Carrnage" (Carr)
- 4th = : Darren Jordon
- 6th = : Patrick Kielty

Celebrity	Race	Auto Test	Car Pin Bowling	Current Total	Piggy Back Racing	Role	Racing Team mate	Final Total
Clarkson	1st (6pts)	3rd (4pts)	3 of 6 (3pts)	13pts	1st (15pts)	Driving	The Kidd	Joint 1st (28pts)
The Kidd	DNF (2pts)	2nd (5pts)	6 of 6 (6pts)	13pts	1st (15pts)	Steering	Clarkson	Joint 1st (28pts)
Ally D	DNF (1pt)	4th (3pts)	6 of 6 (6pts)	10pts	2nd (10pts)	Steering	Carr	3rd (20pts)
Carr	3rd (4pts)	6th (1pt)	2 of 6 (2pts)	7pts	2nd (10pts)	Driving	Ally	Joint 4th (17pts)
Dazza	2nd (5pts)	5th (2pts)	5 of 6 (5pts)	12pts	3rd (5pts)	Driving	Paddy	Joint 4th (17pts)
Paddy	DNF (3pts)	1st (6pts)	0 of 6 (0pts)	9pts	3rd (5pts)	Steering	Dazza	6th (14pts)

=== Episode one ===
This episode introduced the regular presenter, Dougie Anderson.

Competitors:

- Sarah Cawood
- Jon Culshaw
- Sir Steve Redgrave
- Gina Yashere

This episode recreated stunts from movies, and featured racing in modified armchairs and towing a bath full of water with a Ferrari. The two highest scorers after three rounds used the "Car Catapult" to hurl the car of their choice at giant coconuts.

=== Episode two ===
Competitors:

- David Dickinson
- Jenny Frost
- Nina Wadia
- Tommy Walsh

=== Other participants ===
The following notable people are included amongst those who took part in other episodes: Edwina Currie, Ben Fogle, Charlie Dimmock, Steve Furst, Arabella Weir, Shane Lynch, Jilly Goolden, Ainsley Harriott, Jake Maskall, Nell McAndrew, Leanne Wilson, Reggie Yates, Trevor Nelson, Jennie Bond, Beverley Turner, Shane Lynch, Will Mellor and Rowland Rivron
