= The Sitcom Showdown =

2006 British quiz show

- Presented by: Danny Baker
- Country of origin: United Kingdom
- Original language: English
- No. of series: 1
- No. of episodes: 5

Production
- Producer: UMTV
- Running time: 29 minutes

Original release
- Network: UKTV Gold
- Release: 22 April – 20 May 2006

The Sitcom Showdown is a British television quiz show hosted by Danny Baker. To date, it has run for one five-episode series, and was produced by UMTV for the UKTV Gold digital television channel.

== Synopsis ==
Each episode features two teams of three - a 'superfan', their best friend, and a comedian/celebrity. Each team represents their favourite sitcom, and through numerous rounds of quizzes, challenges and good-old laughs, the teams collect points in order to crown an eventual 'winning' show. The show was conceived and developed by Baker who originally envisioned the winning team being allowed to show an episode of their favourite sitcom after the episode was over but such a concept never materialized. In a 2014 interview with Richard Herring Baker described the show as a "stinker" and "not the worst show there's ever been but it was close".

== Episodes ==
1. 'Allo 'Allo! vs. Absolutely Fabulous
2. The Vicar of Dibley vs. The Royle Family
3. One Foot in the Grave vs. dinnerladies
4. Yes Minister vs. Blackadder
5. Fawlty Towers vs. Porridge

== Celebrity team members ==
- 'Allo 'Allo! - Steve Furst
- Absolutely Fabulous - Ian Lavender
- The Vicar of Dibley - Sue Perkins
- The Royle Family - Geoff Lloyd
- One Foot in the Grave - Stephen Frost
- dinnerladies - Linda Robson
- Yes Minister - Emma Kennedy
- Blackadder - Andy Goldstein
- Fawlty Towers - Rowland Rivron
- Porridge - Jenny Powell
