= Ginger Productions =

British television production company

- Company type: Public
- Industry: Media
- Founded: 1994
- Headquarters: Glasgow, Scotland; London, England
- Key people: Chris Evans: (founder; no longer involved)
- Products: Television
- Parent: STV Group
- Website: www.ginger.tv

Ginger Productions is a British television production company that alongside STV Studios, is part of STV Group plc. Based in Waterhouse Square in London, the company's output focuses on Entertainment and Factual Entertainment programming. Ginger was acquired as part of STV's acquisition of the Ginger Media Group in 2000.

Ginger Productions have created TFI Friday, The Priory and Don't Forget Your Toothbrush, Detox Camp and Celebrity Detox Camp (Channel 5). This was followed up in 2005 with Extreme Celebrity Detox for Channel 4. The Tribute to the Likely Lads for ITV starring Ant & Dec. Don't Drop the Coffin (ITV). Ginger Productions is also responsible for Cannibals and Crampons for BBC One, which helped launched the career of Bruce Parry. Other productions include The True Story of Ferrari for BBC One and the Channel 4 drama series Lock Stock..., based on the London gangster film.

In 2005, Ginger began producing Jack Osbourne: Adrenaline Junkie, a documentary series for ITV2. The series has been sold to twelve territories including New Zealand, Korea and Discovery Travel in USA. Ginger Productions made another show for ITV2, with Jack Osbourne's sister the star of Kelly Osbourne: Turning Japanese in 2006. Other titles have included Whatever, a daily TV show for Sky1 and Take Me to the Edge, a reality series for Virgin1.

The company has been listed as a dormant company since at least 2019.
