= David Kuo (financial media personality) =

British stock market analyst (born 1956)

David Kuo 郭大昌 (Born 26 November 1956, Hong Kong) is a stock market analyst and radio personality.

== Personal History ==
After completing a PhD in Chemistry at Imperial College London, David returned to his hometown in Hong Kong to improve his business skills. When he returned to the United Kingdom, via Singapore, he worked for Hilton Group's racing division. Following this he ran his own trading company.

Kuo joined The Motley Fool UK in 2000 as a news reporter, progressing to analyst in 2001 when the Dot-com bubble burst and the company made lay-offs. It was at this point he volunteered to be interviewed by BBC radio, starting his broadcasting career. He returned to Singapore to set up The Motley Fool Singapore in 2013. The business closed in October 2019 citing financial regulations making it impossible to grow the business further. Following the closure Kuo co-founded The Smart Investor.

== Broadcasting ==
David was heard regularly as a guest of Danny Baker on BBC London’s 94.9 FM, and is a regular commentator on national news programmes including CNBC, BBC News, Sky News and Fox Business News.

He previously presented a weekly podcast MoneyTalk, where he discussed the investing issues with members of the business and financial world.
