= The Terry and Gaby Show =

- Genre: Daytime chat
- Created by: Chris Evans
- Presented by: Terry Wogan; Gaby Roslin
- Country of origin: United Kingdom
- Original language: English
- No. of episodes: 200

Production
- Producer: UMTV

Original release
- Network: Five
- Release: 2 June 2003 – 26 March 2004

The Terry and Gaby Show was a British daytime television show broadcast on Five on weekday mornings between 2 June 2003 and 26 March 2004, produced by Chris Evans' company UMTV. It was hosted by Terry Wogan and Gaby Roslin.

The opening titles featured Roslin dressed as a movie star driven to the studio in a limo and walking on a red carpet to the door. Meanwhile, Wogan, carrying a briefcase, rode an old bicycle across London and parked it outside the back door before quietly entering the building.

The show was characterised by its many bloopers and double entendres.

== History ==
=== Early episodes ===
Intended to compete head-to-head with ITV1's This Morning, the show was heavily promoted before its launch. The first show featured Jonathan Ross as its main guest.

Early episodes were designed to emulate the atmosphere of Wogan's BBC Radio 2 breakfast show, like the short lived Wogan's Web in 1998, featuring a butler for Wogan (played by one of the show's producers) serving him alcoholic drinks.

Former Brookside actor Danny McCall presented a section called "Live Loot" from Monday to Thursday, in which he would visit a house somewhere in the UK to convince the homeowner to sell something to him for £100 or less. On the first show he visited future regular Danny Baker. On Friday, the four items collected over the week were given away to viewers.

The show also featured a daily competition called "Kids in Headphones", in which a child of primary school age was shown wearing a pair of headphones, singing along to a tune, which viewers had to identify to win a prize. In later episodes, winners entered a draw to win a television and a selection of DVDs.

Another regular feature involved Johnny Ball taking three questions from viewers at the beginning of each show from Monday to Thursday, which he then went to research, before answering the questions at the end of the show. The third question always involved a long-winded answer explained using props. In the Autumn of 2003, Ball was replaced by Danny Baker.

In one episode, Baker placed a piece of soap in a microwave oven, but burnt his hand removing the soap from the microwave after failing to use the oven glove provided, before removing the glass plate from the microwave, which shattered on the floor.

=== Rating failings ===
The show's ratings failed to match those of This Morning, despite several adjustments to the format. The show drew criticism for the frequent absence and substitution of the two titular hosts; the show's highest ever ratings came when Wogan was not present, and replaced by Jimmy Tarbuck. When Roslin was unavailable, she was usually replaced by Jenny Powell. Other substitute hosts included Les Dennis, Lionel Blair, Linda Barker, Donny Osmond (on the day of Children in Need), Danny Baker, and Richard Whiteley.

The low ratings led to the show being axed after 200 episodes. The 199th episode featured Anne Robinson as a guest in her first television appearance since an alleged facelift (which Robinson denied), leading to substantial coverage of Robinson's appearance on the show in the following day's newspapers.

The last episode of The Terry & Gaby Show was broadcast on 26 March 2004, and was reported as the latest in a series of unsuccessful productions by Chris Evans' production company UMTV. The last show ended with a footage of Evans standing at a market stall eating an apple, a reference to remarks from Evans on the show's launch that he would return to running a fruit & veg stall if the programme failed.
