= TFI Friday =

Entertainment show on British TV

- Genre: Entertainment
- Written by: Danny Baker (1996–2000); Chris Evans (2015, 2026)
- Presented by: Chris Evans; Guest presenters (2000)
- Theme music composer: Ron Grainer
- Opening theme: Theme from Man in a Suitcase
- Country of origin: United Kingdom
- Original language: English
- No. of series: 7
- No. of episodes: 200

Production
- Production locations: Riverside Studios (1996–2000); Cochrane Theatre (2015); The News Building (2026)
- Running time: 60 minutes (inc. adverts)
- Production companies: Ginger Productions (1996–2000); Monkey Kingdom (2015); Olga TV (2015); Virgin Radio UK (2026)

Original release
- Network: Channel 4
- Release: 9 February 1996 – 22 December 2000
- Release: 16 October – 31 December 2015
- Network: Virgin Radio UK; Channel 4
- Release: 6 February 2026 (Note: Began airing on Channel 4 from 17 April 2026) – present

Related
- OFI Sunday

TFI Friday (Thank Four It's Friday), known as TFI Unplugged since 2026, is an entertainment show that was broadcast on Channel 4 television in the United Kingdom from 1996 to 2000, with a revival series in 2015, and on Virgin Radio UK since 2026.

It was produced by Ginger Productions, written by Danny Baker, and hosted by Chris Evans, for the first five series. The sixth series was hosted by several guest presenters. The show was broadcast on Fridays at 6pm from 9 February 1996 to 22 December 2000, with a repeat later that night. Its theme tune was Ron Grainer's theme from Man in a Suitcase, in keeping with Evans' frequent use of 1960s television themes in his work.

In September 2005, Evans announced that he would be returning the TFI Friday format to TV, with OFI Sunday airing on ITV. The first edition was broadcast on 20 November 2005 but was not as successful and quickly axed. A one-off revival episode of TFI Friday was broadcast on Channel 4 on 12 June 2015. The episode was well-received; on 23 June 2015, Channel 4 announced that it had commissioned a full revived series, which began airing on 16 October 2015.

In 2016, Channel 4 announced that there were no plans for any further series; however, in April 2026, the broadcaster picked up episodes of the Virgin Radio podcast version.

== Format ==
The show regularly featured live music, mostly of the then-popular Britpop scene. A snippet of "The Riverboat Song" by Ocean Colour Scene, a band particularly championed by Evans (and the very first band to play on the show, with the same song), was used as an introduction to guests, as they walked the length of a walkway up into the "bar" to be interviewed by the host.

Viewers repeatedly asked if they could have the TFI Friday mug (or one like it) that graced Evans' table every week, so the production company created a limited run of 1,000 mugs. These were offered for sale at a prohibitive price and for a limited period, after which the remaining stock was destroyed live on air when a washing machine was dropped on to them from the height of the television studio.

During November and December 1999, the show included a segment titled "Someone's Going to Be a Millionaire!", inspired by the ITV game show Who Wants to Be a Millionaire? (which would not have its first million-pound winner until November 2000). TFI Friday paid out the promised £1 million jackpot on 24 December 1999, becoming the first British TV show to do so.

=== Regular features ===
Features on the show included:

- Freak or Unique – Every week, there would be five people waiting outside the studio, of whom three would be selected to show off a special if freakish talent (such as juicing an orange with their shoulders, or The Girl Who Cried Milk). A running gag throughout the run was the "Incredibly Tall Old Lady" who would always be waiting outside the studio. She was never nominated (mainly because it was obviously an old woman standing on a box).
- Baby Left Baby Right – A small child was placed on a cushion and the guest was asked which way it might fall.
- Fat lookalikes – People who looked like fat versions of celebrities which was then followed in later series by Asian lookalikes.
- What Does the Fat Bloke Do? – An overweight man was invited on set and asked about his occupation, before dancing and leaving.
- Comment from the Cafe – Evans would rope in Cedric (the proprietor of a local eatery) to perform various embarrassing skits. Cedric became famous for his catchphrase "Hellooooooooo!" and wooden acting.
- Ugly Blokes – Unattractive gentlemen would have the opportunity to turn down the amorous advances of a "gorgeous girl" (Catalina Guirado). A photo of footballer Peter Beardsley was shown during the "Ugly Bloke" theme tune.
- It's Your Letters – A wide assortment of viewers' letters (this was introduced by a burst of Reef's "Place Your Hands", re-recorded for the show with the words "It's Your Letters" replacing the original chorus of "Put your hands on").
- Fishbowl Challenge – A goldfish in a bowl would have two toy bridges for company. Which would it swim under first?
- Another running gag was directed at the show's producer, Will Macdonald (aka Wicked Will of MTV's Most Wanted fame), in which everyone in the bar would point their fingers, begin to swivel them and chant "Wiiillll" very creepily.
- Will: Pub Genius – Will Macdonald would demonstrate a trick that could be performed using tools commonly found in a pub.
- Wooden Bird with Purple Hair – Chris Evans would amuse the audience with a small nodding wooden woodpecker (with purple hair), that slid down a pole whilst an accompanying song was played.
- The Lord of Love – The veteran actor Ronald Fraser dressed in a quilted smoking jacket would recite love poems to girls in the audience.
- Wurthers – The show's cue card man. He became a frequent star of the show alongside Chris, during the last series of the show in which he was the host. At the start of every show, they would both engage in telling a joke working alongside each other, with Wurthers finishing the joke with "I'm only joking of course!", with Chris then replying "He's only joking of course!". This became a frequent running gag before eventually fading out, with this being replaced with Chris sending Wurthers out on a task. The first and most memorable of these was sending him outside to look for a mini driver, while it was raining. Near the end of the show, he found one and told her to say hello to the actor Minnie Driver, by waving at the camera who was at the same time being interviewed on the show with David Duchovny. The segment was originally a one-off, before being made a regular feature on the show.
- Show Us Your Face Then – Someone in a football mascot outfit is introduced to the audience and invited to show them their real face.
- Sink or Swim – The studio audience (and viewers) were invited to speculate as to whether a chosen animal (e.g. a mouse or a snake) would sink or swim in a fish tank. To gasps of concern from the audience, the mouse turned out to be a good swimmer.

=== Swearing ===
Ewan McGregor, shortly after swearing on TFI Friday

The show attracted controversy when Happy Mondays frontman Shaun Ryder appeared on the second episode of the first series, and slipped out the word "fuck" during his interview on the show. A week later, Ewan McGregor also slipped out the word "fuck" on the show, when ranting about the Conservative government of the time. A month later, Shaun Ryder was invited back on the show to do a Stars in Their Eyes skit. Ryder performed (as Johnny Rotten) the Sex Pistols' "Pretty Vacant". The section was transmitted live, as it was not an interview. Ryder shouted "fuck" several times. Subsequently, the show was forced to be pre-recorded in later editions and Ryder has been barred from appearing live on any Channel 4 programme – he is the only person listed by name in the Channel 4 transmission guidebook. Despite this, he reappeared for the live 20th Anniversary Special in June 2015.

In episode 2 of the 2015 series, actor Nicholas Hoult was heard saying "oh fuck it" after Chris Evans asked him to play the trombone. Evans immediately apologized to viewers for the unexpected swearing.

=== Car competition ===
The show gained more notoriety when as part of a competition, two children were forced to go head-to-head in a stare-out contest to win their parents a car. After the competition was won, the boy who had lost then started to cry, which led the tabloid press to attack the show. The next edition showed the boy with the consolation prize of an assortment of toys, an apparent attempt to mitigate controversy, but which was followed by another staring contest (this time for a speedboat), again ending with the losing child crying. The ITC gave Channel 4 a formal warning following these two incidents, and the competition feature never appeared again on the programme. On the 2015 revival show both losing children, now adults, were invited back and given a free holiday to Barbados with their families. Evans apologised for what had been done to them, saying that it should never have happened.

=== Guest presenters ===
In the summer of 2000, Channel 4 announced that the sixth series of TFI Friday was to be the last. Chris Evans left the show leaving the final series to be presented by several guest presenters.

- 10 November 2000 – Spice Girls
- 17 November 2000 – Big Brother 1 contestants ("Nasty" Nick Bateman, Anna Nolan, Craig Phillips, Melanie Hill)
- 24 November 2000 – Davina McCall and Dermot O'Leary
- 1 December 2000 – Sara Cox
- 8 December 2000 – Donna Air and Huey Morgan
- 15 December 2000 – Davina McCall and Dermot O'Leary
- 22 December 2000 – Elton John

== 2015 revival ==
On 30 July 2014, Evans announced during his BBC Radio 2 breakfast show that TFI Friday could be returning to Channel 4, after being asked to host a 20th anniversary special (despite the gap having been only been 19 years), as well as a new series, in 2015. During his radio breakfast show on 24 February 2015, Evans revealed that the show would return on Channel 4 on 12 June. It aired from the Cochrane Theatre in Holborn, TFI Friday's earlier home at Riverside Studios having been demolished.

On 23 June 2015, it was confirmed that Channel 4 had commissioned a new series, which started airing on 16 October 2015, with U2 opening and closing the show. On 7 July 2016, Channel 4 confirmed it had "no plans" to commission more episodes of TFI Friday.

=== Episodes ===
Date	Episode	Guest interview(s)	Performance(s)
16 October 2015	1	Amy Williams; Steve Coogan; Take That; U2; Saoirse Ronan	U2 ("Raised by Wolves"); Sound of the Siren ("Together Alone"); Take That ("Hey Boy"); Slaves ("The Hunter"); U2 ("Vertigo")
23 October 2015	2	Justin Bieber; Dawn French; Nicholas Hoult	Macklemore & Ryan Lewis ("Downtown"); Will Young ("Joy"); Hurts ("Some Kind of Heaven"); Foxes ("Better Love"); Justin Bieber ("What Do You Mean?")
30 October 2015	3	Noel Fielding; Cheryl Fernandez-Versini; David Haye; Adil Ray as Citizen Khan; Duran Duran	Duran Duran ("Pressure Off"); Foals ("What Went Down"); Andreya Triana ("Gold"); Eagles of Death Metal ("Complexity"); Duran Duran and Eagles of Death Metal ("Save a Prayer")
6 November 2015	4	Max Whitlock; Coldplay; Alexander Armstrong; Julianne Moore and Stanley Tucci	The Maccabees ("Something Like Happiness"); 5 Seconds of Summer ("Hey Everybody!"); Benjamin Clementine ("Nemesis"); Coldplay ("Adventure of a Lifetime")
20 November 2015; Open Mic Night Special	5	Mark Ronson; Little Mix	Hozier ("Jackie and Wilson"); Lion Babe ("Where Do We Go"); Stereophonics ("Song for the Summer"); Jeff Lynne's ELO ("When I Was a Boy" and "Livin' Thing")
27 November 2015	6	Ronnie Wood; The Vamps; John Bishop; Ellie Goulding	The Vamps ("Rest Your Love"); Wolf Alice ("You're a Germ"); Jamie Lawson ("Wasn't Expecting That"); Ellie Goulding ("Something in the Way You Move")
4 December 2015	7	Kylie Minogue; Daniel Radcliffe; Lionel Richie	Mumford & Sons ("Tompkins Square Park"); Florence and the Machine ("Delilah"); Kylie Minogue ("Let It Snow"); Nathaniel Rateliff ("S.O.B.")
11 December 2015	8	Martin Freeman; Idris Elba; Sharleen Spiteri	Paul Heaton and Jacqui Abbott ("I Don't See Them"); James Bay ("Hold Back the River"); Rita Ora and Sigma ("Coming Home"); Wretch 32 and Tanika ("Murdah Loves John")
18 December 2015; Christmas Special	9	Alan Partridge; James Corden; Tom Jones; Jack Whitehall; Zig and Zag; Lee Mack	Tom Jones ("Take My Love (I Want to Give It)"); Lianne La Havas ("Unstoppable"); Bryan Adams ("Brand New Day"); Elle King ("Ex's & Oh's")
31 December 2015; New Year's Eve Special	10	Quentin Tarantino and Kurt Russell; Olly Murs; Will Poulter; Noel Fielding; AP McCoy	Olly Murs ("Kiss Me"); Florence and the Machine ("What Kind of Man"); The Vaccines ("Dream Lover"); Izzy Bizu ("White Tiger"); Sia ("Alive")

=== Features ===
- Too Good Not to Be on TV – Unheard of acts appear on the show performing their talents.
- Slip and Slide – Guests see who can go down the slip and slide the fastest.
- Cute Contest purely for Ratings – A celebrity will judge which thing or person is the cutest out of a possible three.
- Noah's Killer Question – Evans' son Noah asks a question in order to try to put them under pressure.
- It's Your Letters – Viewers' letters read out. Introduced by Coldplay, who took over from Reef in episode 4.

== TFI Unplugged ==
On 6 February 2026, Virgin Radio UK brought the show back as an online podcast with Evans still as host. It follows a similar format to the original, with hopes that it would become regular fixture. Owing to the successes of the online series, Channel 4 commissioned a six-episode run and started airing the episodes from 17 April 2026. Channel 4's commissioning editor, Cimran Shah, said: "TFI Friday was doing stripped-back, personality-led chat long before visualised-podcasts were a twinkle in our eyes! I'm thrilled that this deal brings TFI back to Channel 4, reimagined in a way that feels fresh, immediate and perfectly suited for a new generation wherever they watch Channel 4." In June 2026, the show was recommissioned for a further six episodes.

A new series started in September 2026; however, this reverted to being online podcast again.

== Transmissions ==
Series	Start date	End date	Episodes
1	9 February 1996	28 June 1996	17
2	13 September 1996	27 June 1997	41
3	5 September 1997	26 June 1998	41
4	4 September 1998	2 July 1999	41
5	10 September 1999	23 June 2000	41
6	10 November 2000	22 December 2000	7
Special	12 June 2015		1
7	16 October 2015	31 December 2015	10

=== TFI Unplugged ===
Series	Start date	End date	Episodes
1	6 February 2026	22 May 2026	15
2	5 June 2026	10 July 2026	6
3	4 September 2026	ongoing	TBA
