= OFI Sunday =

Television series

- OFI Sunday logo
- Created by: Chris Evans
- Presented by: Chris Evans
- Country of origin: United Kingdom
- No. of episodes: 6

Production
- Producer: UMTV
- Running time: 45 minutes

Original release
- Network: ITV
- Release: 20 November – 30 December 2005

Related
- TFI Friday

OFI Sunday was a British entertainment show hosted by Chris Evans. It aired on Sundays at 10:30 pm on ITV. The title "OFI" stood for "Oh Flip It's Sunday", similar to the previous show TFI Friday.

== Reception ==
Critical reaction to OFI Sunday was extremely poor. Many considered the show self-indulgent and esoteric, with Evans creating features that were more for the amusement of himself, his guest and/or the studio audience than for the viewers at home. A notable example of this came during an appearance by James Nesbitt, Evans brought on a pub band— whom the pair had seen playing on a night out—to perform. While Evans and Nesbitt clearly revelled in the situation, the audience was left out of the joke.

Criticism was also directed at Evans for frequently drawing on events from his personal life. Majority of the guests were also friends of Evans, with the first being his ex-wife Billie Piper which further supported claims over Evans's self-indulgence. In one memorable incident, during the second episode, Evans held up a sign asking celebrity guests to call in, admitting on air that they hadn't booked anyone, which many critics viewed as a desperate move.

== Cancellation ==
The series was cancelled after just five episodes, with another series planned depending on its reception. At first, the debut show began with 5 million viewers at 10:30 pm, but by the end of the 45-minute runtime, the audience had halved to 2.5 million, fewer than the 3.3 million watching Notting Hill on Channel 4 between 11 pm and 11:15 pm. Due to the heavy drop in ratings during the progress of each show (the second started with 5 million which it inherited from I'm a Celebrity...Get Me Out of Here!, but ended up with a loss from the first show of 700,000 by 11:15 pm) and falling ratings week-by-week, OFI Sunday was axed by ITV resulting in a second series never being made. It also never ranked in the ITV top 30 weekly BARB ratings and was another flop for UMTV.

The sixth show was shown on 30 December 2005 which was on a Friday (as explained by Evans on the fifth show) and does not appear on "OFI Sunday" episode lists on various websites. Guests for this edition included Will Young, Katie Melua and Ulrika Jonsson. Originally, there were plans to feature a tribute band who were chosen by Evans as the best in the country to appear on this edition, but this segment was scrapped by UMTV following the two unaired pilot episodes of the main series filmed in early November.

The first pilot episode was filmed on 6 November 2005 at ITV London Studios, with Jodie Kidd as the main guest and three U2 tribute bands: Us4//U2, Achtung Baby and Unforgettable Fire. The studio audience were in 70s-themed fancy dress. Each tribute band played 90 seconds of a U2 song. Us4//U2 played "Beautiful Day", Achtung Baby played "Vertigo" and Unforgettable Fire played "New Year's Day". The idea was that after all three bands had played their songs the audience would clap for each band in turn and a mannequin dummy dressed as a rock guitarist in a black wig would register the claps on its clapometer guitar fretboard. Us4//U2 were the winners of this pilot episode.

The 27 November show was due to feature Oasis tribute bands but the idea was ultimately scrapped. Footage profiling these tribute act was filmed on 8 November 2005 but never aired. Other tribute acts would have seen Robbie Williams being paid homage to. The winner would have played at Evans's end of year party, with the acts playing into the commercial breaks. The second unaired pilot episode featured the same three Oasis tribute acts as those that would have been on 27 November show. Writer Allan Pease was interviewed for one of the pilots episodes.

== Guest stars ==
- 20 November 2005 – Billie Piper
- 27 November 2005 – James Nesbitt
- 4 December 2005 – Zöe Lucker and McFly
- 11 December 2005 – Bradley Walsh and Sharleen Spiteri
- 18 December 2005 – Robbie Williams
- 30 December 2005 (only episode to be aired on a Friday) – Will Young, Katie Melua and Ulrika Jonsson

== Features ==
- Secret Photo – Evans takes a photo of something before the show then shows it to the guest. He then doesn't tell anyone else what the photo was about and destroys the photo.
- Glad or sad – Audience members and the guest decide whether they are "glad" or "sad" about something in this week's news.
- Mine or not mine? – A viewer or audience member guesses if something belongs to Evans or someone else. If they are right they win a gadget.
- Gadgets and gizmos – Evans and co-presenter Tom show some gadgets and gizmos that the audience and viewers can win. Tom also rates the gadgets points out of 10.
- Laid Up – (only in the first episode) Three "laid up" contestants compete to win a classic car.
- Look-a-bit-likely – In the fifth episode Robbie Williams decides if people look a bit like famous celebrities.

== Co-presenters ==
- Tom – Ex-navy officer (submariner) who presents and rates the gadgets and gizmos.
- Hiten – Chris' real life assistant for the show for the first two shows, but from the third episode would spin the caller/audience wheel for Mine or Not Mine in a wig.
