= Chris Evans (presenter) =

English television presenter (born 1966)

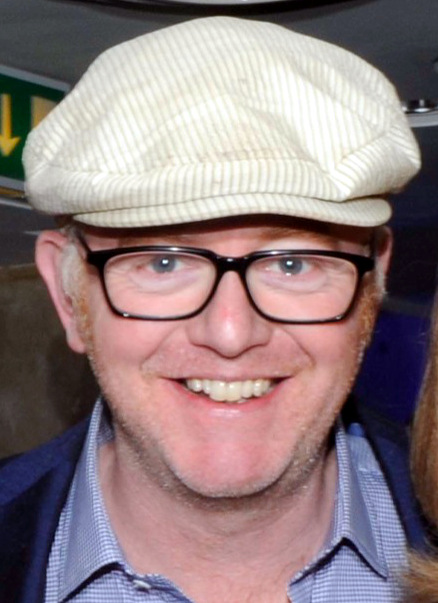
- Evans in 2010
- Born: Christopher James Evans; 1 April 1966 (age 60); Warrington, England
- Education: Boteler Grammar School; Padgate High School
- Occupations: Television presenter; disc jockey; producer
- Years active: 1983–2002; 2005–present
- Employer: Virgin Radio UK
- Television: The Big Breakfast (1992–94); Don't Forget Your Toothbrush (1994–95); TFI Friday (1996–2000; 2015, 2026-); The One Show (2010–15); Top Gear (2016)
- Spouses: Carol McGiffin (m. 1991; div. 1998); Billie Piper (m. 2001; div. 2007); Natasha Shishmanian (m. 2007)
- Children: 5
- Relatives: Thom Evans (cousin); Max Evans (cousin)
- Website: virginradio.co.uk/the-chris-evans-breakfast-show

Christopher James Evans (born 1 April 1966) is an English television presenter, radio DJ, and producer for radio and television.

Evans began his broadcasting career working for Piccadilly Radio, Manchester, as a teenager, before moving to London as a presenter for the BBC's BBC Radio London and then Channel 4 television, where The Big Breakfast made him a star. Soon he was able to dictate highly favourable terms, allowing him to broadcast on competing radio and TV stations. Slots like Radio 1 Breakfast and TFI Friday provided a mix of celebrity interviews, music and comic games, delivered in an irreverent style that attracted high ratings, though often also generated significant numbers of complaints. By 2000, he was the UK's highest paid entertainer, according to the Sunday Times Rich List. In the tax year to April 2017, he was the BBC's highest-paid presenter, earning just under £2.25 million annually.

In 2005, Evans started a new career on BBC Radio 2, hosting his Drivetime programme in April 2006, before moving in 2010 to host The Chris Evans Breakfast Show every weekday morning. He presented The One Show on Fridays between 2010 and 2015. Between 2011 and 2018, he co-hosted Radio 2 Live in Hyde Park. In 2015, he signed a three-year deal to lead a new Top Gear line-up and presented a revival series of TFI Friday. On 4 July 2016, he announced that he would be stepping down as presenter of Top Gear.

On 3 September 2018, Evans announced that he would be leaving The Radio 2 Breakfast Show on Christmas Eve, and would be going to Virgin Radio UK to present its breakfast show. He moved from BBC Radio 2 with most of his regular team.

== Early life ==
Evans was born in Warrington, England, the youngest child of a bookmaker and a health authority wages clerk Martin Joseph Evans (12 November 1921 – 25 April 1979), and Minnie Beardsall (1926–2018), who managed a corner shop. His siblings are brother David (born 1953) and sister Diane (born 1963). He started his schooling at St Margaret's Church of England Infants and Junior School, and later the Junior School in Orford, Warrington. Evans's father died of colorectal cancer, and his mother was a breast cancer survivor.

Evans passed the Eleven-Plus exam and started at Boteler Grammar School, Warrington. After the death of his father on Wednesday, 24 April 1979, the 13-year-old Evans took part-time work at an outlet of T. J. & B. McLoughlin's newsagent–tobacconist in Woolston, and ran an alternative tuck-shop at Padgate High School, which was a comprehensive school he attended for the final three years of his secondary education. Evans left secondary school aged 16 after moving into the sixth form, and then had a number of dead-end jobs in and around Warrington, including at a private detective agency and, notoriously, as a "Tarzan-ogram".

== Career ==
=== Early career ===
Evans began his professional career at Piccadilly Radio, Manchester, in 1983, where he had previously had unpaid schoolboy work. Until 1984 Evans had three jobs: as an assistant to Timmy Mallett, and playing a character on his show called 'Nobby Nolevel' ('No 'O' Level'); acting as a disc jockey in the evenings at local pubs when he was not at Piccadilly Radio; and still working at the newsagents, opening up daily at 5 a.m. to sort out the newspaper deliveries.

Evans switched to a full-time position at the station in 1984, his new role including being driven around the Manchester area in the radio car to turn up at listeners' houses. In addition he was producer to presenter James H. Reeve. Following this he presented a weekday graveyard slot with competitions and segments where listeners had opportunities to sell their belongings on air.

After working as a producer on Richard Branson's service The Superstation, where he produced material for Jonathan Ross, Evans went on to work at the newly launched BBC Greater London Radio, first as a producer on Emma Freud's mid-morning show, then on Weekend Breakfast with Danny Baker.

Owing to his success working on both shows, Evans was offered a producer role at BBC Radio 1, but was persuaded to stay at GLR after station controller Matthew Bannister gave him the chance to present his own show, taking over Saturday afternoons in early 1990. Three months later, he started presenting The Greenhouse, a Monday-to-Thursday evening show; he remained in this slot until the end of 1990.

In early 1991, as a result of his first regular TV hosting work presenting the Power Up breakfast show on The Power Station for British Satellite Broadcasting, Evans moved to presenting Round at Chris's, every Saturday morning from 10:00 a.m. to 1:00 p.m., which he continued to present until April 1993.

=== Career success ===
In addition to his Saturday morning show on GLR, in March 1992 Evans began presenting a Sunday afternoon show on BBC Radio 1, replacing Phillip Schofield. His show, Too Much Gravy, was broadcast from 14:30 to 16:00 and ended in September 1992. His move to Radio 1 was short-lived but seen as a huge success, with controller Johnny Beerling later admitting he wished he'd offered Evans a full-time show there and then. At the time, however, Evans objected that Radio 1 had attempted to constrain his style, preventing him from using the "zoo" format, allegedly because Steve Wright was already doing that on the station.

In April 1993, Evans left GLR and joined the new Virgin Radio, to host a Saturday morning show.

=== The Big Breakfast ===
Evans's departure from radio was in part so he could devote his time to the new Channel 4 breakfast television show, The Big Breakfast, from 28 September 1992. He co-hosted the show with Gaby Roslin.

Evans left The Big Breakfast on 29 September 1994 and formed his own television production company, Ginger Productions. Its first major programme, Don't Forget Your Toothbrush, was broadcast between 1994 and 1995. The original concepts proved to be lucrative for Evans as its format was sold to numerous foreign broadcasters.

=== The Radio 1 Breakfast Show ===
In April 1995, Evans returned to radio to host the flagship Radio 1 Breakfast Show. Evans negotiated into his contract with Radio 1 a clause allowing him to still make television programmes, and specifically an option to make a Friday night programme for Channel 4. A further clause required the Breakfast Show to be produced independently by Evans's Ginger company, rather than in-house by BBC Radio.

Allowed to create the "zoo" format he had previously been disallowed from performing on Radio 1, Evans was given a free rein by his friend, the station's controller Matthew Bannister. Critics hated innuendo-laden features like Honk Your Horn and in Bed with Your Girlfriend, but Evans put on 600,000 new listeners over Steve Wright – one for every £5 spent on salary and advertising. The effect also flowed through into the listening figures for later programmes. The audience grew as the breakfast format became more outrageous: humiliating assistant Holly Samos by repeatedly asking her about her sex life (Evans and Samos were reportedly in a relationship at periods through their time working together), and encouraging two female guests to perform a strip show on live radio. The show's highest listening figure reached 7.5 million.

Evans began making editions of Channel 4's TFI Friday from 1996. The show – devised, produced and hosted by Evans through his Ginger Media company – combined celebrity interviews, musical guests and daft games and competitions. Largely based on the successful formula of his radio show, it was initially a big success. However, as the success of both shows peaked, combined with a string of celebrity relationships and highly publicised nights drinking with friends Danny Baker and Paul Gascoigne, the strain began to show, and a model emerged described as a "template for his approach to all his subsequent projects – an abundance of enthusiasm at the beginning which eventually falls prey to boredom and shiftlessness."

Beginning to think he was indispensable at Radio 1, the first big falling-out with management came in December 1995 after taking his crew out on a 17-hour pub-crawl which ended two hours before they were due on air: Evans was fined one day's pay, £7,000. In 1996, broadcasting watchdogs investigated a continual trail of complaints against the show: Radio 1 refused to comment, and Evans never apologised. Evans also made increasing public demands of the Radio 1 management: after taking an extra week of unplanned holiday, Evans chose to turn up half an hour late for his 06:30 show and then demanded that his hours were changed so that it was a permanent fixture – this request was accepted.

However, following the summer break things got decidedly worse. Criticised by the broadcasting watchdog for a tasteless joke about Holocaust victim Anne Frank, Evans countered with an item about haemorrhoids. Asked by Bannister to watch the rules, Evans the next day branded Bannister "The Fat Controller". In November, Evans announced on air that he was medically unfit to be on the radio – Bannister re-negotiated his contract to double his holiday to twice that of other Radio 1 DJs. After more publicised public drinking and self-confessed illness, Evans's spell at the station ended in January 1997 when he quit after his demand not to host the show on Friday (to have a full day getting ready for his TV show) was not accepted.

The Radio 1 Breakfast Show was taken over by Mark and Lard (Mark Radcliffe and Marc Riley). Ratings fell significantly and they were replaced after eight months with the relatively unknown Kevin Greening and the well-known children's TV presenter Zoe Ball. Their tenure started on 13 October 1997.

=== Virgin Radio ===
During a holiday in Killarney, Evans listened to the Irish broadcaster Gerry Ryan on the radio. Evans claims the variety on Ryan's show made him want to return to radio. Evans was then hired by Virgin Radio to host its breakfast show, prompting an immediate upsurge in station listening figures of 1.8 million to 2.6 million. His first show was on 13 October 1997, the same day as Kevin Greening and Zoë Ball on Radio 1. Starting at 7:00 am, Evans's crew presented the show from Monday to Friday, but without Evans on a Friday.

As Richard Branson had decided to reduce his media holding, he began talks to sell the station to Capital Radio in a deal that would have given him 10% of holding company Capital Group. As this became public knowledge, Evans, who did not want to work for Capital, publicly dismissed them as "a bleating, blowing asthmatic dog." On 9 December, with the assistance of investors, Evans's vehicle Ginger Media Group bought Virgin Radio from Branson for £85 million, to control the interests both of Ginger Productions and Virgin Radio. Both Apax Partners and Branson each owned 20% of Ginger Media Group, while Evans and his investors owned the remaining 60%. The group later engaged in the prospect of buying the Daily Star newspaper, but decided against from commercial angles.

Virgin Radio's new programme controller Paul Jackson, in light of audience figures which had dropped from a peak of 2.7 million to 1.7 million, had pruned Evans's "zoo" team and installed a music policy which replaced more eclectic choices with a strict diet of chart pop. As a result, on 20 June Evans was followed throughout the day by tabloid newspaper photographers, and undertook an "18-hour bender" which started after his show at 9.30 in the morning, and ended – after numerous pints of Kronenbourg and Guinness, plus five bottles of Dom Pérignon – with Evans asleep in front of a lap-dancer at Stringfellows. Later photographed by the tabloids that week with new wife Billie Piper in the nearest pub to their home in Hascombe, Surrey, while claiming he was too ill to present his show, he was dismissed on 28 June 2001 for repeatedly failing to arrive at work. Evans was replaced by the older Steve Penk, whom Evans criticised for his age – 39 versus Evans's then 35. Evans attempted to sue Virgin Radio, claiming that he was unfairly dismissed and denied share options worth £8.6 million. On 26 June 2003, in the judgement of Evans v SMG Television Ltd. & Ors 2003 EWHC 1423 (Ch), Justice Lightman found that he had been fairly dismissed and was not entitled to the share options. Giving his ruling at the High Court, Evans was publicly criticised for his attitude by the judge, who said of Evans: "He has the temperament of a prima donna." Virgin Radio/SMG later countersued, with Evans ordered to pay £1 million towards their legal costs.

=== UMTV ===
In August 2002 Evans set up a radio and television production company, UMTV, with the aim of specialising in live, cutting-edge, entertainment programming. Over the next 3 years UMTV produced more than 375 hours of television, with mixed success. TV shows included Boys and Girls hosted by Vernon Kay for Channel 4, Johnny Vegas: 18 Stone of Idiot for Channel 4 / E4; OFI Sunday for ITV; Live with Christian O'Connell and Live with Chris Moyles for Five; and the BAFTA award-winning School of Hard Knocks for 4 Learning.

Following two high-profile shows which failed to perform in the ratings, UMTV hired Terry Wogan and Evans's former Big Breakfast co-host Gaby Roslin to host a weekday morning magazine show, The Terry and Gaby Show. Evans said publicly that if this show failed he would set up a market stall. Despite critical acclaim the audience numbers never took off and Channel 5 axed the show after its year-long run, citing its high cost as a reason. True to his word, Evans was pictured at the end of the final show with a market stall and later he opened it for real at Stables Market, Camden.

=== Radio 2 ===
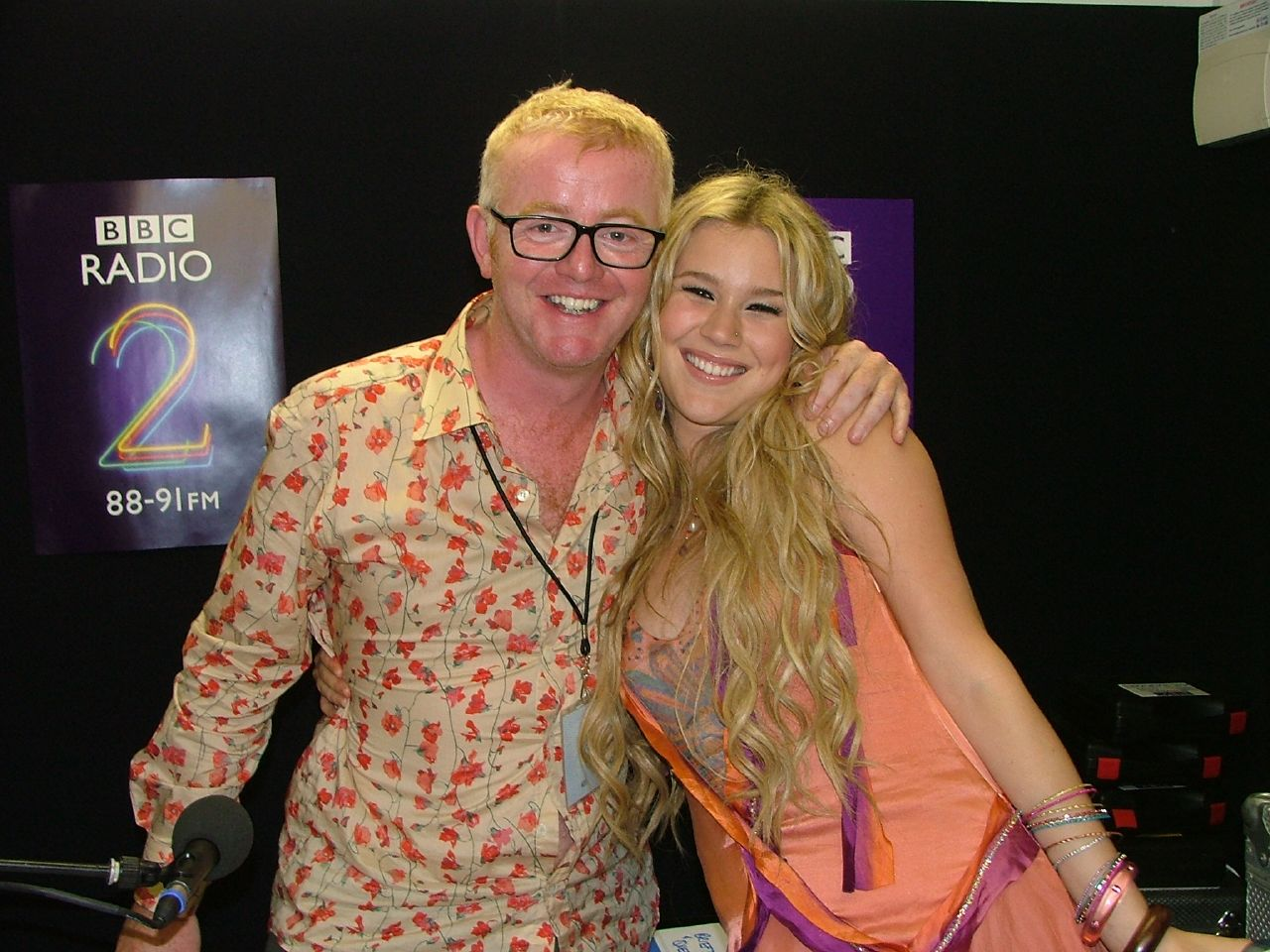
Evans and Joss Stone in 2005

Evans re-entered public life in early 2005, presenting the breakfast slot of UK Radio Aid's day of programming for the victims of the Asian tsunami, which was aired on most of the UK's commercial radio stations, and also The BRIT Awards in 2005 and 2006. From April 2005, Evans presented a number of one-off bank holiday shows for BBC Radio 2, including coverage of the Live 8 concert in London.

==== Saturday afternoon show ====
Evans then joined Radio 2 on a permanent basis in September 2005, presenting a weekly Saturday afternoon show from 14:00 to 17:00. His first show featured singer Robbie Williams, and accompanied by a posse including friend "Big" Pete Winterbottom and newsreader Andrew Peach. Evans told listeners to his first show: "We've had a couple of test drives over the summer and we've decided to take it. Yes, we like this vehicle."

==== Move to Drivetime ====
The show was well received by listeners and critics, and Evans was announced as the successor to Radio 2's Drive time show on 2 March 2006, succeeding long-time host Johnnie Walker, beginning on 18 April. RAJAR audience figures published in August 2006 showed Evans had 150,000 fewer listeners than his predecessor's last show but was on par with previous years. The second set of RAJAR's published in October 2006 showed his audience was up by 109,000-year-on-year, and up by 33,000 compared with the previous quarter. Figures showed he was drawing an average audience of 4.9 million a day on his drivetime show. By the end of 2007, the show was averaging over five million listeners. On 7 September 2009 it was announced that Evans would take over breakfast show from Terry Wogan after Wogan announced his intention to leave the show at the end of the year. Evans hosted his final drivetime show on Christmas Eve 2009.

==== The Chris Evans Breakfast Show ====
===== BBC Radio 2 (2010–2018) =====
Evans took over the Radio 2 breakfast show on 11 January 2010. The show was originally 30 minutes longer than the Wogan incarnation and began at 07:00, but following the departure of Sarah Kennedy from early breakfast, the show was extended by another 30 minutes and began at 06:30. The show always ended with a handover to Ken Bruce at 09:30. While Evans replaced Wogan owing to his long-planned retirement, supporters of Kennedy alleged there was a deliberate intention to force her out so that Evans's show could be lengthened. His first three songs were The Beatles' "All You Need Is Love" and "Got to Get You into My Life"; and Frank Sinatra's "Come Fly with Me". His co-presenters included ex-BBC TV newsreader Moira Stuart, sports presenter Jonny Saunders (who was replaced in June 2011 by Vassos Alexander), and travel reporter Lynn Bowles. Features included The Gobsmackers (two songs selected by a listener that sound good played back-to-back).

===== Virgin Radio (2019–present) =====
On 3 September 2018, Evans announced live on air that he would be leaving the show and the station in December for Virgin Radio. On 11 September the BBC Director General Lord Hall of Birkenhead told the House of Commons Digital, Culture, Media and Sport Select Committee that, as well as wanting a new challenge, releasing the salaries of those at the BBC earning more than £150,000 had been a contributing factor in Evans's leaving. A month later, Evans confirmed live on air that Zoe Ball would replace him on the show from January 2019. The show officially ended on 24 December 2018. Evans moved to Virgin with most of his Radio 2 team including sports reporter Vassos Alexander and Rachel Horne, who provides regular news bulletins while expanding her role as the show's travel expert.

=== Sony Music Radio Personality of the Year ===
In May 2006, Evans was named Music Radio Personality of the Year at the annual Sony Radio Academy Awards, defeating rivals Jamie Theakston, Lauren Laverne, Marc Riley and Tim Lovejoy to win. When accepting the award, Evans thanked the BBC for giving him "a second chance." Evans won 'music radio personality' the following year, while his show won the Entertainment award. "I didn't expect this," he said. "I wouldn't have minded if I didn't win, but I really love the fact I have won." Evans was voted the 82nd most influential media personality in The Guardian newspaper's 2007 poll.

=== Return to television ===
Following his success in the 1990s, Evans's attempts at a TV comeback in the 21st century have been mixed with a record of poor ratings and cancellations, including falling viewing figures for his recent role as co-host of Friday editions of The One Show. In November and December 2005 Evans presented OFI Sunday on ITV. In a move described by Private Eye as Partridgean, ex-wife Billie Piper was the first guest on the programme. OFI Sunday was cancelled after just five shows following poor reviews and low viewing figures. Its cancellation led Evans to complain on air during his Saturday BBC Radio 2 slot that he no longer knew how to be successful on television. In 2009 Evans narrated the CBeebies Christmas pantomime.

=== The One Show (2010–15) ===
In 2010, it was announced that Evans would be replacing Adrian Chiles as the Friday co-presenter of The One Show on BBC One. Chiles and then co-host Christine Bleakley left the show to join ITV. Evans presented the show on Fridays with Alex Jones, and occasionally covered other weekdays. Matt Baker presented the show on a regular Monday to Thursday basis.

In 2015, Evans announced he was quitting The One Show to focus on Top Gear.

=== Return to Channel 4 ===
In January 2011 Evans returned to Channel 4 to present a new reality show Famous and Fearless, in which eight celebrities were arranged into two teams, 'Boys' and 'Girls'. The celebrities taking part on the boys' team were: Rufus Hound, Charley Boorman, Sam Branson (son of Richard Branson) and Jonah Lomu. On the girls' team were Jenny Frost, Kacey Ainsworth, Sarah Jayne Dunn and Dame Kelly Holmes. Holmes won the girls'; Boorman won the boys' and the show outright. In February 2011, it was reported that the show had been axed after one series due to poor ratings.

=== Top Gear ===
On 16 June 2015, the BBC announced that Evans had signed a three-year deal to be the main presenter on the BBC Two motoring show Top Gear, following the departure of Jeremy Clarkson, Richard Hammond, and James May.

On his radio show the next morning he confirmed his acceptance and explained the offer came after James May and Richard Hammond had confirmed to the BBC they would not be returning to the show. Evans stated that before the announcement, he sent texts to May, Hammond and Clarkson and received supportive replies from all three.

In February 2016, it was confirmed that Matt LeBlanc, Rory Reid, Sabine Schmitz, Chris Harris and Eddie Jordan would also be joining Evans for the twenty third series of Top Gear. It was also revealed that the new series would begin airing in May 2016. In July 2016, having presented just one series of the show Evans stepped down from his presenting role on Top Gear posting on social media "Stepping down from Top Gear. Gave it my best shot but sometimes that's not enough.

== Controversies ==
=== Sale of GMG – dismissal and legal cases ===
On 14 March 2000, Evans agreed to sell Ginger Media Group to Scottish Media Group for £225 million. The sale made Evans the highest-paid entertainer in the UK in 2000, estimated by the Sunday Times Rich List to have been paid around £35.5 million. Following poor reviews of TFI Friday, and Evans himself handing over presentation of the last series of the show to a series of "friends", the show was cancelled in December 2000.

Evans continued to host the station's breakfast show, but echoes of his earlier dismissal from Radio 1 began to emerge. In May 2000, the station was fined £75,000 (then the largest penalty imposed by the Radio Authority) for his repeated on-air endorsement of Ken Livingstone in the London mayoral elections.

=== Allegations and termination from Top Gear ===
The first episode of the new six-episode series of Top Gear was broadcast 29 May 2016. In June 2016 it was reported that fellow presenter Matt LeBlanc had threatened to quit the show unless Evans was fired, because of inappropriate behaviour on set. The source alleged that Evans had become jealous of the attention the other presenters were getting and had become distanced from the group.

On 4 July 2016 Evans announced that he had stepped down as presenter of the show and cut his contract with Top Gear short by two years. Throughout the duration of the new series, Evans had received strong criticism due to his presenting style.

In the tax year to April 2017, he was the BBC's highest paid presenter, earning between £2.2 million and £2.25 million.

== Personal life ==
Evans has a daughter by former fiancée Alison Ward. In 1998, after a long-running dispute, the couple reached an out-of-court arrangement whereby Evans provided a home for his daughter and an allowance to Ward. On 9 January 2015, Evans became a grandfather when his daughter gave birth to her son.

Evans married Carol McGiffin in 1991. Their 1993 break up was not amicable and the two divorced in 1998. McGiffin was scathing about Evans in newspaper articles as late as 2026.

During his time at BBC Radio 1 and Virgin, Evans had well publicised relationships with Kim Wilde, model Rachel Tatton-Brown (whose sister was a researcher on The Big Breakfast), assistant producer Suzi Aplin, Anthea Turner, Geri Halliwell and Melanie Sykes.

In May 2000, Evans met teenage pop star Billie Piper, whom he dated for a while. As a present to him, she proposed on his 35th birthday, and the couple married in a £200 ceremony at the Little Church of the West in Las Vegas on 6 May 2001, in a ceremony attended by six guests including best man Danny Baker. Piper was 18 at the time. In September 2004, news stories circulated regarding a trial separation; Evans at the time had a stall at Camden Market where he sold furniture and paintings from his London and Los Angeles homes, commenting: "I just want to get rid of it all, it's just a headache." In 2005, it was confirmed that Evans and Piper would divorce, with Piper publicly stating that she would take no money from Evans. Almost three years after they had separated, Evans and Piper divorced in May 2007.

A keen golfer who plays with a handicap of 15, Evans met professional golfer, part-time model and columnist for Golf Punk magazine Natasha Shishmanian when they became golf partners in the All*Star Cup celebrity tournament in Newport, Wales; Evans gave his 17-year-old caddy at the 2005 event, Natalie Harrison, a £10,000 Russian Kristall Smolensk diamond he won for the quality of his play. Evans and Shishmanian married in August 2007, and held a reception in Faro, Portugal, the following weekend that was attended by Evans's former wife Piper. The couple have four children and live in Ascot, Berkshire. Their two eldest sons have appeared a number of times on their father's Breakfast Radio show.

In March 2008, Evans said in his Radio 2 blog that he had taken "magic mushrooms" two days before attending a Meat Loaf concert at the Royal Albert Hall. He said: "I thought I was chronicling the Albert Hall moving sideways on the back of a giant rock and roll crab, something I didn't think the world should miss." A Metropolitan Police spokeswoman said the force would investigate any reports of class A drug-taking.

A fan of fast cars, and particularly Ferraris, Evans was banned from driving for 56 days in 2001 and fined £600 after admitting to a speeding charge at Staines Magistrates' Court after being stopped by Surrey Police when driving at 105 mph (169 km/h) on the A3 road in Esher in January 2001. In 2005 Evans crashed his silver Ferrari 575M Maranello into a verge near his then Surrey home. On 18 May 2008, Evans attended RM Auctions/Sotheby's Ferrari auction in Maranello, Italy, and bought a 1961 250 GT Spyder California SWB formerly owned by US actor James Coburn for the then world record price of 6.4 million euros. In May 2010 he bought a 1963 Ferrari 250 GTO, one of only thirty-six built, for £12 million. Reportedly he sold three Ferraris from his collection to pay for it. He sold it three years later for $25 million to a Swiss collector.

In August 2002, Evans was one of seven onboard the sailing yacht Nausicaa, in the Solent, when one of the crew members, James Ward — landlord of Evans's local pub, the White Horse in Hascombe, Surrey — was struck by the yachts boom, knocked overboard and drowned. Evans was said to be "deeply shocked and saddened" by the incident.

In September 2007, Evans and Shishmanian started taking helicopter lessons at Shoreham Airport.

Evans is a first cousin of the father of former Scottish Rugby internationals Max Evans and Thom Evans.

Evans is also an ambassador for The Scout Association.

On 15 November 2016, Evans was awarded an honorary degree from York St John University; he was presented this by university's chancellor John Sentamu at York Minster. On 3 May 2018, Evans's mother Minnie died at the age of 92.

On 21 August 2023, Evans revealed he was being treated for melanoma; on 20 September, he revealed he was now cancer-free.

In August 2023, Evans flipped over an auto rickshaw at his own festival in Hampshire and two passengers sustained minor injuries.

== Shows hosted ==
The following lists are the main shows Evans has presented:

=== Television ===
Year	Title	Channel	Role
1990–1991	Power Up	The Power Station / BSB	Presenter
1991	TV Mayhem	ITV / TV-am	Presenter
1992–1994	The Big Breakfast	Channel 4	Co-presenter
1994–1995	Don't Forget Your Toothbrush	Channel 4	Presenter
1996–2000, 2015, 2026	TFI Friday	Channel 4	Presenter
2001	Bob The Builder: A Christmas to Remember	CBBC	Voice Of Lennie Lazenby
2005	OFI Sunday	ITV	Presenter
2009	CBeebies Pantomime; Jack and Jill	CBeebies	Narrator
2010–2015	The One Show	BBC One	Friday Co-presenter
2011	Famous and Fearless	Channel 4	Co-presenter
2011	Sir Jimmy Savile: As It Happened	BBC1	Narrator
2016	Top Gear	BBC Two	Presenter (1 series)

=== Radio ===
- Piccadilly Radio, Saturday afternoons & weekday evenings (1986–1987)
- BBC GLR, Saturday afternoons, 3–5 pm (1990)
- BBC GLR, The Greenhouse, Mondays–Thursdays, 7:30–10 pm (1990)
- BBC GLR, Round at Chris's, Saturdays, 10 am – 1 pm (January 1991– April 1993)
- BBC Radio 1, Too Much Gravy, Sundays, 2:30 pm – 4 pm (March – September 1992)
- Virgin Radio, Saturday mornings, 10 am – 1 pm (May – July 1993)
- BBC Radio 1, Weekday Breakfast Show, 6:30–9 am (April 1995 – January 1997)
- Virgin Radio, Weekday Breakfast Show, 6–10 am (October 1997 – June 2001)
- BBC Radio 2, Saturday afternoons, 2–5 pm (September 2005 – April 2006)
- BBC Radio 2, Weekday Drivetime Show, 5–7 pm (18 April 2006 – 24 December 2009)
- BBC Radio 2, Weekday Breakfast Show, 7:00–9:30 am (11 January 2010 – 24 September 2010); 6:30–9:30 am (11 October 2010 – 24 December 2018)
- Virgin Radio UK, Weekday Breakfast Show, 6:30–10:00 am (21 January 2019–present)

== Bibliography ==
Evans has written three autobiographies:

- It's Not What You Think. Harper Collins. 2009. ISBN 978-0-00-732723-2.
- Memoirs of a Fruitcake. Harper Collins. 2010. ISBN 978-0-00-734568-7. (also advertised as It's Not About Me: From Billie to Breakfast)
- Call The Midlife. W&N. 2015. ISBN 978-0297609827.

Media offices
Preceded by Steve Wright	BBC Radio 1 Breakfast Show Presenter; 1995–1997	Succeeded by Mark and Lard
Preceded by Johnnie Walker	BBC Radio 2 Drivetime Show Presenter; 2006–2009	Succeeded by Simon Mayo
Preceded by Terry Wogan	BBC Radio 2 Breakfast Show Presenter; 2010–2018	Succeeded by Zoe Ball
