= 2009 in British radio =

This is a list of events in British radio during 2009.

== Events ==
=== January ===
- 5 January –
  - Chiltern Radio, Hereward FM, Radio Broadland, Q103, Northants 96, SGR Colchester, SGR Ipswich, and Horizon Radio are all rebranded as Heart after earlier being acquired by Global Radio.
  - 105.7 Smooth Radio have signed former BRMB presenter Tammy Gooding to present the drivetime show. She takes up the role from today, and replaces Nigel Williams who has moved to 102.2 Smooth Radio in London.
- 24 January – Jonathan Ross returns to his Saturday morning show on BBC Radio 2 after finishing his 12-week suspension following his role in the Russell Brand Show prank telephone calls row.
- 27 January – Bob Shennan is appointed as Controller of BBC Radio 2 following the resignation of Lesley Douglas. He takes up the position in February.

=== February ===
- 2 February – Joanne Malin joins BBC Radio WM to present her mid-morning show.
- 20 February – Radio 1's Minimix launches.
- 21 February – A radio adaptation of Alan Bennett's drama The Lady in the Van starring Maggie Smith and Bennett premieres on BBC Radio 4.

=== March ===
- 1 March – The final edition of chart show Fresh 40 is broadcast.
- 13 March – BBC Radio 2 confirms plans to overhaul its weekend schedule from April. This will include Paul O'Grady, Alan Carr and Emma Forbes joining the network to present shows, while the Saturday afternoon comedy hour will move to Thursday evenings. The changes will also see Johnnie Walker present Sounds of the 70s on Sunday afternoon.
- 23 March – Fox FM, GWR FM Bath, GWR Bristol, GWR FM Wiltshire, Champion 103, 2CR, Essex FM, Gemini FM, Severn Sound, Ocean FM, Lantern FM, Coast 96.3, Plymouth Sound, Orchard FM, South Hams Radio, Wirral's Buzz and 2-Ten FM are all rebranded as Heart.
- 30 March –
  - BBC Southern Counties Radio closes resulting in the return of BBC Surrey and BBC Sussex as stand-alone separate stations.
  - Century 105 is re-branded as Real Radio North West.

=== April ===
- 1 April – Ownership of Touch FM (Banbury) is transferred to Banbury Broadcasting Company Ltd. The station is renamed Banbury Sound on 1 June.
- 3 April – Les Ross presents his final weekday afternoon show on BBC Radio WM as he prepares to retire from radio (but will return to the airwaves in December).
- 4 April – BBC Radio Swindon, which had opted out of BBC Radio Wiltshire, is closed. The two stations are merged as BBC Wiltshire.
- 16 April – Huddersfield station Pennine FM stops broadcasting after going into administration.
- Undated in April – The third broadcast of Pirate BBC Essex takes place over the Easter holiday weekend. The broadcast began five days after the release of the comedy movie The Boat that Rocked which was set on a 1960s pirate radio station.

=== May ===
- Undated in May – Orion Media purchases BRMB, Mercia, Wyvern, Beacon in the West Midlands and Heart 106 in the East Midlands from Global Radio for a sale price worth £37.5 million.
- 7 May – Pennine FM is bought by Pennine Media Ltd and returns to the air as Pennine FM, Huddersfield's More Music Station
- 22 May – The BBC says that Jonathan Ross's Radio 2 show will no longer be broadcast live following complaints about a joke he made on an edition of the programme which some listeners interpreted as being anti-gay.
- 24 May – Children's magazine show Go4It is broadcast on BBC Radio 4 for the final time. The reason given is that it does not attract enough young listeners and that less than 1 in 20 of the show's audience is aged between 4 and 14, with the average age of the listeners being between 52 and 55. Consequently, there are now no children's programmes on BBC analogue radio.
- 30 May – Mo Dutta leaves Radio 2.

=== June ===
- 1 June – Birdsong Radio, a digital radio station broadcast from 2008 as a filler on the Digital One platform following the closure of Oneword goes off air with the launch of Amazing Radio.
- 6 June – Zoë Ball joins Radio 2 as a weekend presenter.
- 7 June –
  - Emma Forbes joins Radio 2 as a weekend presenter.
  - Rich Clarke presents the final edition of Hit40UK, which is succeeded by The Big Top 40 Show the following Sunday.
- 13 June – Singer Emma Bunton begins hosting her own pre-recorded Saturday drive time radio show on Heart in the Saturday afternoon slot 4pm – 7pm. She will also present the Friday drivetime show on London's Heart 106.2.
- 14 June – Launch of The Big Top 40 Show, a chart show broadcast on commercial radio stations in the UK, and based on a combination of airplay and music download figures provided by iTunes.
- 15 June – Commercial radio's chart show Hit40UK is relaunched as The Big Top 40 Show.
- 18 June – It is announced that the media executive Steve Orchard has bought the CN Group of Midland radio stations, having established the Quidem group. The stations involved in the purchase are: 107.3 Touch FM, 102 Touch FM, 96.2 Touch FM, 101.6 & 102.4 Touch FM and 107.1 Rugby FM.
- 21 June – BBC Radio Shropshire presenter Matthew Carr, presenter of the station's Country Music Show and The Wrekin Wrangler, described as the "toughest quiz on radio", presents his final show before retiring after 23 years with the station.
- 22 June – Invicta FM, Southern FM and 103.4 Marcher Sound are rebranded as Heart.

=== July ===
- 1 July – Premiere of the Torchwood drama "Asylum" on BBC Radio 4.
- 2 July – Debut of the Torchwood drama "Golden Age" on BBC Radio 4.
- 3 July – Debut of the Torchwood drama "The Dead Line" on BBC Radio 4.
- 15 July – Radio 2 presenter Sarah Kennedy causes controversy after describing the late Enoch Powell as "the best Prime Minister this country never had" on her Dawn Patrol programme, and is later reprimanded for the remarks.
- 25 July – Chris Tarrant presents his last Saturday morning show for GMG Radio.
- 26 July – Malcolm Laycock presents his final edition of Sunday Night at 10 on BBC Radio 2.
- 29 July – Conservative leader David Cameron apologizes for any offence caused after using the word "twat" on live radio during a breakfast radio show interview on Absolute Radio.

=== August ===
- 2 August – Jazz singer Clare Teal takes over as presenter of Sunday Night at 10.
- 15 August – Former Radio 2 presenter Malcolm Laycock criticises the network's management for abandoning its older listeners and claims he was constructively dismissed by the station, although Radio 2 denies this to be the case. Laycock resigned from his position following a long-running dispute with his producer over the content of his show, and because of issues regarding his salary.
- Undated in August – London station Club Asia goes into administration and is taken over by the Litt Corporation, owners of rival station Sunrise Radio. The station is relaunched as Buzz Asia.

=== September ===
- 14 September – All programmes, apart from weekday/Saturday breakfast and Sunday afternoons, are networked across the KMFM network
- 18 September – Jo Whiley presents her final weekday program for BBC Radio 1.
- 21 September – Fearne Cotton takes over Jo Whiley's old mid-morning show on Radio 1.
- 27 September – Reggie Yates becomes the sole presenter of The Official Chart.

=== October ===
- No events

=== November ===
- 2 November – Alpha 103.2, Minster Northallerton and Durham FM are merged into a single station called Star Radio North East.
- 10 November – Thirteen stations owned by GMG Radio take part in an eighteen-hour on-air appeal to raise money for the Help for Heroes charity. The event raises almost £200,000.

=== December ===
- 1 December – Touch Radio is rebranded to Touch FM.
- 7 December – Les Ross returns to the airwaves when he becomes the presenter of the Big City Breakfast Show on Birmingham's Big City Radio 89.1.
- 13 December – Emma Forbes announces that she is to leave her Radio 2 Sunday morning show.
- 18 December – After 27 years, Sir Terry Wogan presents his final breakfast show on BBC Radio 2.
- 25 December – Tom Binns cuts off a broadcast of the Queen's Speech while presenting a Christmas Day show on Birmingham's BRMB with the comment "two words: bore ing", an action that leads to him being sacked from the station.

=== Unknown ===
- Aston FM in Birmingham changes its name to Big City Radio.

== Station debuts ==
- 10 January – Vixen 101
- February – Felixstowe Radio
- 30 March – BBC Surrey and BBC Sussex
- 1 June – Amazing Radio
- 1 June – Banbury Sound
- 20 June – 96.5 Bolton FM
- 4 December – Absolute 80s

== Programme debuts ==
- 29 March – ElvenQuest on BBC Radio 4 (2009–2013)
- 5 April – Paul O'Grady on the Wireless on BBC Radio 2 (2009–2022)
- 31 May – Americana on BBC Radio 4 (2009–2011)
- 4 June – Newsjack on BBC7 (later BBC Radio 4 Extra) (2009–Present)
- 5 June – Electric Ink on BBC Radio 4 (2009–2010)
- 23 July – Bigipedia on BBC Radio 4 (2009–2011)
- 21 September – Fearne Cotton (2009–2015)
- Alan and Mel's Summer Escape on BBC Radio 2 (2009–2020)

== Returning this year after a break of one year or longer ==
- 5 April – Sounds of the 70s (2000–2008, 2009–Present)

== Continuing radio programmes ==
=== 1940s ===
- Sunday Half Hour (1940–2018)
- Desert Island Discs (1942–Present)
- Woman's Hour (1946–Present)
- A Book at Bedtime (1949–Present)

=== 1950s ===
- The Archers (1950–Present)
- The Today Programme (1957–Present)

=== 1960s ===
- Farming Today (1960–Present)
- In Touch (1961–Present)
- The World at One (1965–Present)
- The Official Chart (1967–Present)
- Just a Minute (1967–Present)
- The Living World (1968–Present)
- The Organist Entertains (1969–2018)

=== 1970s ===
- PM (1970–Present)
- Start the Week (1970–Present)
- You and Yours (1970–Present)
- I'm Sorry I Haven't a Clue (1972–Present)
- Good Morning Scotland (1973–Present)
- Newsbeat (1973–Present)
- File on 4 (1977–Present)
- Money Box (1977–Present)
- The News Quiz (1977–Present)
- Feedback (1979–Present)
- The Food Programme (1979–Present)
- Science in Action (1979–Present)

=== 1980s ===
- Steve Wright in the Afternoon (1981–1993, 1999–2022)
- In Business (1983–Present)
- Sounds of the 60s (1983–Present)
- Loose Ends (1986–Present)

=== 1990s ===
- The Moral Maze (1990–Present)
- Essential Selection (1991–Present)
- Essential Mix (1993–Present)
- Up All Night (1994–Present)
- Wake Up to Money (1994–Present)
- Private Passions (1995–Present)
- The David Jacobs Collection (1996–2013)
- Sunday Night at 10 (1998–2013)
- In Our Time (1998–Present)
- Material World (1998–Present)
- Scott Mills (1998–2022)
- The Now Show (1998–Present)
- Jonathan Ross (1999–2010)

=== 2000s ===
- BBC Radio 2 Folk Awards (2000–Present)
- Big John @ Breakfast (2000–Present)
- Kermode and Mayo's Film Review (2001–2022)
- The Big Toe Radio Show (2002–2011)
- A Kist o Wurds (2002–Present)
- Fighting Talk (2003–Present)
- Jeremy Vine (2003–Present)
- The Chris Moyles Show (2004–2012)
- Annie Mac (2004–2021)
- The Jo Whiley Show (2001–2011)
- Elaine Paige on Sunday (2004–Present)
- The Bottom Line (2006–Present)
- The Christian O'Connell Breakfast Show (2006–Present)
- The Unbelievable Truth (2006–Present)
- The Radcliffe and Maconie Show (2007–Present)
- Act Your Age (2008–2010)
- Geoff Lloyd's Hometime Show (2008–2017)
- The Strand (2008–2013)
- The Media Show (2008–Present)

== Ending this year ==
- 5 November – The Penny Dreadfuls Present... (2008–2009)
- 18 December – Wake Up to Wogan (1993–2009)
- 24 December – Chris Evans Drivetime (2006–2009)
- Go4It (2001–2009)

== Closing this year ==
Date	Station	Debut
30 January	107.3 Abbey FM	2006
30 March	BBC Southern Counties Radio	1994
1 April	Mersey 106.7	2001
3 April	Time 107.3	1999
3 April	Time 106.8	1990
30 April	Valleys Radio	1996
28 May	Focal Radio	2008
1 June	Birdsong Radio	2008
1 July	Mix 107	2001

== Deaths ==
- 29 January – Bill Frindall, 69, sportscaster and statistician
- 22 June – Steve Race, 88, pianist-composer and radio presenter
- 29 August – Simon Dee, 74, disc jockey and television interviewer
- 29 October – Norman Painting, 85, actor
- 8 November – Malcolm Laycock, 71, music broadcaster and producer
- 31 December – John Cushnie, 66, Northern Ireland landscape designer and gardening broadcaster
