= 2006 in British radio =

This is a list of events in British radio during 2006.

== Events ==
=== January ===
- 16 January – FM102 The Bear in Stratford-upon-Avon and Kix 96 in Coventry are merged and relaunched as Touch FM
- 23 January – Former XFM presenter Christian O'Connell joins Virgin Radio to present The Christian O'Connell Breakfast Show.

=== February ===
- Undated in February – The A List launches on Heart, Real Radio and Century FM. Featuring adult contemporary music, the programme is presented by Melanie Sykes and Nick Snaith.
- 6 February – BRMB's second "Two Strangers and a Wedding" competition ends with the marriage of Craig Cooper and Rebecca Duffy at Birmingham's Hotel du Vin.
- 28 February – Radio 2 Drivetime presenter Johnnie Walker announces he will leave the show after seven years. He will present his last show on 31 March.

=== March ===
- 2 March – Chris Evans is announced as Johnnie Walker's replacement on BBC Radio 2's Drivetime show from April.
- 8 March – Radio 1 launches its YouTube channel.

=== April ===
- 3 April – BBC GMR reverts to its original name of BBC Radio Manchester.
- 9 April – Russell Brand presents his first Saturday night Russell Brand Show on BBC Radio 2.
- 11 April – Launch of the Wake Up to Wogan podcast, a downloadable audio file providing highlights of the BBC Radio 2 show.
- 18 April – Chris Evans takes over Radio 2's Drivetime show from Johnnie Walker.
- 19 April – London's 102.2 Smooth FM gives away £118,454 to a listener from Essex who correctly identifies their Secret Song as Diana Ross's My Old Piano. The Secret Song has been running since November 2005 and, at this time is the biggest cash prize on radio this century.
- 23 April – The Radio 4 UK Theme is used for the last time, amid controversy over its axing by Radio 4 controller Mark Damazer. The decision to axe the theme, which had been used since 1978, to make way for a 'pacy news briefing' led to widespread coverage in the media and even debate in Parliament.
- 29 April – In some areas Centre FM is renamed as Touch FM.
- Undated in April – The timeslot for Bob Harris's Saturday evening show on Radio 2 is moved forward an hour, meaning it airs from 11 pm to 2 am instead of 10 pm to 1 am.

=== May ===
- No events

=== June ===
- 24 June – The final edition of Home Truths is broadcast on BBC Radio 4.
- Undated in June – Nick Clarke broadcasts Fighting to Be Normal on BBC Radio 4, an audio diary of his treatment for cancer. In August he returns to presenting The World at One on the network, but his last appearance is on 12 September and he dies on 23 November.

=== July ===
- 25 July – A Secret Song competition on Manchester's 100.4 Smooth FM is won by a listener who correctly identifies the track as Razzamatazz by Quincy Jones. The competition had been running since 27 March with the prize money standing at £86,500 at the time it was won.
- Undated in July – Networking is increased on the north of England Magic stations when the local afternoon show is dropped in favour of a networked programme. Consequently, only the breakfast show is locally produced.

=== August ===
- 27 August – Sue Lawley presents her final edition of BBC Radio 4's Desert Island Discs after eighteen years. Her last castaway is the actress Joan Plowright.

=== September ===
- 6 September – Kiss 100 is relaunched after a decline in listening figures, dance stations Vibe 101 and Vibe 105-108 are also rebranded to Kiss.
- 16 September – Saturday Live, Home Truths' replacement show on BBC Radio 4, begins with Fi Glover as presenter.
- Undated in September – Broadcast presenters Clare Balding and Alice Arnold enter into a civil partnership.

=== October ===
- 1 October – Kirsty Young takes over as presenter of Desert Island Discs. Her first guest is children's author and illustrator Quentin Blake.
- 10 October – Talksport becomes the first national commercial radio broadcaster to win Premier League commentary rights. Talksport wins a package that allows it to broadcast the second choice Saturday afternoon games that kick off at 3pm – the BBC will get first pick.
- 22 October – A new chart show called Fresh 40 launches. Aired on the Kiss and Galaxy networks and other youth-orientated stations, it counts down the top 40 r’n’b and dance songs and is broadcast against commercial radio's Hit40uk chart programme and the BBC Radio 1 Sunday afternoon chart show.

=== November ===
- 3 November – Charles Wood's play The Conspiracy of Sèvres (about the 1956 Suez Crisis) is broadcast.
- 18 November – Russell Brand joins Radio 2 to present a regular weekly programme.
- Undated in November – CTR 105.6 in Maidstone, Kent, is purchased by the KM Group, taking the number of KM-owned stations in Kent to 7.

=== December ===
- 8 December – CB radio in the United Kingdom becomes licence-free.
- Undated in December – GMG Radio purchases the Saga Radio Group.

=== Unknown ===
- Galaxy 102.2 is renamed Galaxy Birmingham in line with other Galaxy radio stations.
- Sport on 5 is renamed 5 Live Sport.

== Station debuts ==
- 14 February – Talk 107
- 25 February – Touch FM (Banbury)
- 29 June – 99.9 Radio Norwich
- 10 July – Yorkshire Radio
- 15 August – Gaydio
- 2 September – Brunel FM
- 11 September – Bay FM
- 1 October – Original 106 (Solent)
- 16 October – 107.3 Abbey FM
- 18 December – Radio Music Shop
- 25 December – theJazz

== Programme debuts ==
- 3 January – The Geoff Show on Virgin Radio (2006–2008)
- 23 January – The Christian O'Connell Breakfast Show on Virgin Radio (later Absolute Radio) (2006–present)
- 9 April – The Russell Brand Show on BBC 6 Music (later BBC Radio 2) (2006–2008, 2010, 2013, 2017)
- 18 April – Chris Evans Drivetime on BBC Radio 2 (2006–2009)
- 12 July – The Personality Test on BBC Radio 4 (2006–2007)
- 25 August – Jest a Minute on BBC Radio Wales (2006–2009)
- September – The Dream Ticket with Joe Mace on BBC 6 Music (2006–2007)
- 8 September – 1966 and All That on BBC Radio 4 (2006)
- 18 October – The Unbelievable Truth on BBC Radio 4 (2006–present)
- 14 November – Living with the Enemy on BBC Radio 4 (2006)
- Unknown – The Bottom Line on BBC Radio 4 (2006–present)

== Continuing radio programmes ==
=== 1940s ===
- Sunday Half Hour (1940–2018)
- Desert Island Discs (1942–present)
- Woman's Hour (1946–present)
- A Book at Bedtime (1949–present)

=== 1950s ===
- The Archers (1950–present)
- The Today Programme (1957–present)
- Your Hundred Best Tunes (1959–2007)

=== 1960s ===
- Farming Today (1960–present)
- In Touch (1961–present)
- The World at One (1965–present)
- The Official Chart (1967–present)
- Just a Minute (1967–present)
- The Living World (1968–present)
- The Organist Entertains (1969–2018)

=== 1970s ===
- PM (1970–present)
- Start the Week (1970–present)
- You and Yours (1970–present)
- I'm Sorry I Haven't a Clue (1972–present)
- Good Morning Scotland (1973–present)
- Newsbeat (1973–present)
- File on 4 (1977–present)
- Money Box (1977–present)
- The News Quiz (1977–present)
- Feedback (1979–present)
- The Food Programme (1979–present)
- Science in Action (1979–present)

=== 1980s ===
- Steve Wright in the Afternoon (1981–1993, 1999–2022)
- In Business (1983–present)
- Sounds of the 60s (1983–present)
- Loose Ends (1986–present)

=== 1990s ===
- The Moral Maze (1990–present)
- Essential Selection (1991–present)
- No Commitments (1992–2007)
- Wake Up to Wogan (1993–2009)
- Essential Mix (1993–present)
- Up All Night (1994–present)
- Wake Up to Money (1994–present)
- Private Passions (1995–present)
- Parkinson's Sunday Supplement (1996–2007)
- The David Jacobs Collection (1996–2013)
- Sunday Night at 10 (1998–2013)
- In Our Time (1998–present)
- Material World (1998–present)
- Scott Mills (1998–2022)
- The Now Show (1998–present)
- Jonathan Ross (1999–2010)

=== 2000s ===
- Dead Ringers (2000–2007, 2014–present)
- BBC Radio 2 Folk Awards (2000–present)
- Sounds of the 70s (2000–2008, 2009–present)
- Big John @ Breakfast (2000–present)
- Parsons and Naylor's Pull-Out Sections (2001–2007)
- Jammin' (2001–2008)
- Go4It (2001–2009)
- The Jo Whiley Show (2001–2011)
- Kermode and Mayo's Film Review (2001–2022)
- The Big Toe Radio Show (2002–2011)
- A Kist o Wurds (2002–present)
- The Day the Music Died (2003–2007)
- Fighting Talk (2003–present)
- Jeremy Vine (2003–present)
- Trevor's World of Sport (2004–2007)
- The Chris Moyles Breakfast Show (2004–2012)
- Annie Mac (2004–2021)
- Elaine Paige on Sunday (2004–present)

== Ending this year ==
- 22 June – It's Been a Bad Week (1999–2006)
- 31 March – Drivetime with Johnnie Walker (1998–2006)
- 4 July – Mitch Benn's Crimes Against Music (2004–2006)
- 10 August – The Dream Ticket with Nemone (2005–2006)
- 29 September – 1966 and All That (2006)
- 19 December – Living with the Enemy (2006)

== Closing this year ==
Date	Station	Debut
2 June	Primetime Radio	2000
29 September	Star 107.9	1998

== Deaths ==
- 1 February – Ernest Dudley, 97, novelist, journalist, screenwriter, actor and radio broadcaster
- 27 February – Linda Smith, 48, comedian
- 19 April – June Knox-Mawer, 75, romantic novelist and radio broadcaster
- 8 July – Peter Hawkins, 82, voice actor
- 5 October – Robert Dentith, 29, presenter of The Unsigned Show on Kerrang! Radio
- 21 October – Paul Walters, 59, BBC radio and TV producer
- 31 October – William Franklyn, 81, actor
- 23 November – Nick Clarke, 58, radio and television presenter and journalist
- 27 November – Alan Freeman, 79, disc jockey and radio personality
- 18 December – Mike Dickin, 63, Talksport radio presenter (car accident)
- 23 December – Charlie Drake, 81, comedian
