= 2003 in British radio =

This is a list of events in British radio during 2003.

== Events ==
=== January ===
- 3 January
  - Galaxy 101 is renamed Vibe 101.
  - Hirsty's Daily Dose launches on Galaxy 105.
- 5 January
  - 'Doctor' Neil Fox presents the first Hit40UK, the successor of the Pepsi Chart Show.
  - Mark Goodier joins Classic FM to present its weekly chart show.
- 6 January
  - Jeremy Vine takes over Jimmy Young's old lunchtime show on BBC Radio 2.
  - Les Ross takes over from David Hamilton as breakfast show presenter on Birmingham's Saga 105.7FM.
  - The LBC services swap wavebands. The rolling news service News Direct 97.3 moves to AM and is renamed LBC News 1152 and LBC News 1152 transfers to FM and is renamed LBC 97.3. The change takes place following the purchase of the two stations by Chrysalis Radio.
- Undated in January
  - Neptune Radio and CTFM are rebranded KMFM Shepway and White Cliffs Country and KMFM Canterbury respectively.
  - Just over a year after EMAP decided to simulcast London station Magic 105.4 on its eight medium wave Magic stations in northern England, and following a sharp decline in listening, the station ends the networking of Magic 105.4. It replaces the simulcast with a regional northern network.

=== February ===
- 9 February – Wes Butters becomes the presenter of The Official Chart.
- 11 February – John Peters presents the first programme (the breakfast show) on Saga 106.6 FM in Nottingham, making it his third station launch. He launched Radio Trent in 1975 and GEM-AM in 1988.
- 17 February – A breakfast presenter who was dismissed from Century 106 after playing a spoof song about the Taliban in the wake of the September 11 attacks has settled his case for unfair dismissal, it is reported.

=== March ===
- 1 March – Dee 106.3 launches in the local Chester area – the first dedicated station for the city.
- 17 March – Death in London of Alan Keith, aged 94. Earlier in the month he recorded an announcement that he intended to retire from the BBC programme Your Hundred Best Tunes, which he devised, after 44 years, but fell ill almost immediately afterwards; his final programme is broadcast 12 days after his death, making him the longest serving and oldest presenter on British radio.

=== April ===
- 8 April – The Radio Academy Hall of Fame is established to honour those who have made an "outstanding contribution" to British broadcasting. Among those inducted into the Hall of Fame at the inaugural ceremony include Richard Dimbleby, Tony Hancock, Arthur Askey, John Humphrys, Alistair Cooke, Alan Freeman, Tony Blackburn and Noel Edmonds.

=== May ===
- 3 May – BBC Radio 1 cancels the first day of its One Big Weekend at Heaton Park, Manchester due to poor weather. However, the second day of the event goes ahead as scheduled.
- 29 May – Journalist Andrew Gilligan broadcasts a report on the BBC Radio 4 Today programme stating that the government claimed in its 2002 dossier that Iraq could deploy weapons of mass destruction within forty-five minutes knowing the claim to be dubious; a political storm ensues.

=== June ===
- 5 June – Radio 2 presenter Johnnie Walker announces that he will be taking time off air to undergo treatment after being diagnosed with non-Hodgkin's lymphoma. During his time away the show is presented by Stuart Maconie and Noel Edmonds (who makes a brief return to radio).
- 9 June – Simon Bates replaces Henry Kelly as Classic FM's weekday breakfast show presenter.

=== July ===
- 1 July – The rolling news service on Digital One, provided by ITN, stops broadcasting.

=== August ===
- No events.

=== September ===
- 13 and 14 September – BBC Radio 1's second One Big Weekend festival takes place at Cardiff.

=== October ===
- 10 October – Lesley Douglas is appointed Controller of BBC Radio 2 and BBC 6 Music.
- 19 October – More than three decades after it first began broadcasting as a pirate station, and 18 years since its last broadcast, Radio Jackie goes on air as a legal station. It broadcasts to south west London, replacing Thames Radio which haS fallen into financial difficulty.

=== November ===
- 28 November – Some of the BBC's radio and television services, including BBC Radio 4, BBC Radio 5 Live and BBC News 24, are blacked out by a power cut and a fire alert.

=== December ===
- 4 December – Broadcasters John Peel, Chris Tarrant, John Dunn, Sue MacGregor and Douglas Cameron are inducted into the Radio Academy Hall of Fame.
- 6 December – Bloomberg stops broadcasting on Digital One.
- 19 December – Sara Cox presents her final breakfast show on BBC Radio 1. She is succeeded by Chris Moyles in the new year.

== Station debuts ==
- 1 February – Mid 106 FM
- 11 February – Saga 106.6 FM
- 1 March – Dee 106.3
- 5 May – 107 Splash FM
- 3 July – Club Asia
- 3 September – River FM
- 5 October – Dearne FM
- 18 October – CTR 105.6
- 26 October – Ivel FM
- 10 November – North Norfolk Radio
- 22 November – Two Lochs Radio
- Unknown – Heat Radio
- Unknown – The Hits Radio
- Unknown – Insight Radio

== Programme debuts ==
- 6 January – Jeremy Vine on BBC Radio 2 (2003–Present)
- 12 February – Elephants to Catch Eels on BBC Radio 4 (2003–2004)
- 8 July – The House of Milton Jones on BBC Radio 4 (2003)
- 8 August – Ring Around the Bath on BBC Radio 4 (2003–2004)
- 28 August – That Mitchell and Webb Sound on BBC Radio 4 (2003–2013)
- 17 September – The Food Quiz on BBC Radio 4 (2003–2005)
- 4 October – Fighting Talk on BBC Radio 5 Live (2003–Present)
- 29 October – Whispers on BBC Radio 4 (2003–2005)
- 8 November – The Day the Music Died on BBC Radio 2 (2003–2007)

== Continuing radio programmes ==
=== 1940s ===
- Sunday Half Hour (1940–2018)
- Desert Island Discs (1942–Present)
- Letter from America (1946–2004)
- Woman's Hour (1946–Present)
- A Book at Bedtime (1949–Present)

=== 1950s ===
- The Archers (1950–Present)
- The Today Programme (1957–Present)
- Your Hundred Best Tunes (1959–2007)

=== 1960s ===
- Farming Today (1960–Present)
- In Touch (1961–Present)
- The World at One (1965–Present)
- The Official Chart (1967–Present)
- Just a Minute (1967–Present)
- The Living World (1968–Present)
- The Organist Entertains (1969–2018)

=== 1970s ===
- PM (1970–Present)
- Start the Week (1970–Present)
- You and Yours (1970–Present)
- I'm Sorry I Haven't a Clue (1972–Present)
- Good Morning Scotland (1973–Present)
- Newsbeat (1973–Present)
- File on 4 (1977–Present)
- Money Box (1977–Present)
- The News Quiz (1977–Present)
- Feedback (1979–Present)
- The Food Programme (1979–Present)
- Science in Action (1979–Present)

=== 1980s ===
- Steve Wright in the Afternoon (1981–1993, 1999–2022)
- In Business (1983–Present)
- Sounds of the 60s (1983–Present)
- Loose Ends (1986–Present)

=== 1990s ===
- The Moral Maze (1990–Present)
- Essential Selection (1991–Present)
- No Commitments (1992–2007)
- Wake Up to Wogan (1993–2009)
- Essential Mix (1993–Present)
- Up All Night (1994–Present)
- Wake Up to Money (1994–Present)
- Private Passions (1995–Present)
- Parkinson's Sunday Supplement (1996–2007)
- The David Jacobs Collection (1996–2013)
- Westway (1997–2005)
- The 99p Challenge (1998–2004)
- Puzzle Panel (1998–2005)
- Drivetime with Johnnie Walker (1998–2006)
- Sunday Night at 10 (1998–2013)
- In Our Time (1998–Present)
- Material World (1998–Present)
- Scott Mills (1998–2022)
- The Now Show (1998–Present)
- It's Been a Bad Week (1999–2006)
- Jonathan Ross (1999–2010)

=== 2000s ===
- Dead Ringers (2000–2007, 2014–Present)
- BBC Radio 2 Folk Awards (2000–Present)
- Sounds of the 70s (2000–2008, 2009–Present)
- Big John @ Breakfast (2000–Present)
- Think the Unthinkable (2001–2005)
- Parsons and Naylor's Pull-Out Sections (2001–2007)
- Jammin' (2001–2008)
- Go4It (2001–2009)
- The Jo Whiley Show (2001–2011)
- Kermode and Mayo's Film Review (2001–2022)
- Concrete Cow (2002–2004)
- The Dream Ticket with Janice Long (2002–2004)
- The Big Toe Radio Show (2002–2011)
- A Kist o Wurds (2002–Present)

== Ending this year ==
- July – Comedy Album Heroes (2001–2003)

== Closing this year ==
- 3 July – Liberty Radio (1995–2003)

== Deaths ==
- 1 January – Cyril Shaps, 79, character actor
- 9 January – Peter Tinniswood, 66, broadcast comedy scriptwriter and novelist
- 17 March – Alan Keith, 94, actor and longtime classical music presenter
- 23 March – Fritz Spiegl, 77, Austrian-born flautist, radio broadcaster, writer and theme tune composer
- 20 April – Debbie Barham, 26, comedy scriptwriter (heart failure due to anorexia)
- July – Kerry Juby, 55, disc jockey
- 23 September – Sarah Parkinson, 41, producer, writer and performer on radio and television programmes, wife of Paul Merton (breast cancer)
- 29 December – Bob Monkhouse, 75, comedy writer-performer and television game show host
