= 2002 in British radio =

This is a list of events in British radio during 2002.

== Events ==
=== January ===
- 8 January – Scot FM becomes part of the Real Radio network when it is purchased by GMG Radio and is renamed accordingly.
- Undated in January – Atlantic 252 closes after more than twelve years on air.

=== February ===
- 2 February – BBC Radio 5 Live Sports Extra begins broadcasting as a national digital station.
- 3 February – In the broadcast Shipping Forecast, the name of sea area Finisterre is changed to FitzRoy.
- 9 February – Following the announcement of the death of Princess Margaret, the younger sister of Elizabeth II, some radio and television schedules are changed to make room for tribute programmes. Among the tributes paid to her is an edition of The Archers aired on 10 February, a programme on which the Princess made a personal appearance in 1984.
- mid February – 107.7 Chelmer FM is renamed Dream 107.7.
- 28 February–1 March – The first three community radio stations – Bradford Community Broadcasting, Cross Rhythms in Stoke and Angel Community Radio (Havant) – start broadcasting as part of a trial of community radio which sees 15 stations go on air during 2002. The trial, under the title of “Access Radio”, saw each station originally licensed for one year. All three stations will be continuing on air more than twenty years later.

=== March ===
- 11 March
  - BBC 6 Music begins broadcasting as a national digital alternative music station.
  - TEAMtalk 252 begins broadcasting on Atlantic 252's former frequency. It is launched as a rival for Talksport and BBC Radio 5 Live.
- 30 March – Death of Queen Elizabeth the Queen Mother. Due to human error, Independent Radio News fails to give an immediate alert to its 258 client stations for which it apologises.

=== April ===
- 6 April – BBC Radio 4 premieres Ian Curteis's The Falklands Play (written in 1986); the television version airs four days later on BBC Four.

=== May to June ===
- No events

=== July ===
- July–August – BBC North West operates BBC 2002, a temporary radio station set up to provide a bespoke service for Greater Manchester of the 2002 Commonwealth Games.
- 31 July
  - TeamTalk 252 closes after four months on air. The 252 kHz long wave frequency is re-subsumed by Irish broadcaster RTÉ to provide a version of RTÉ Radio 1 to the expatriate community in Britain.
  - Radio 1 presenter Chris Moyles is criticised by the Broadcasting Standards Commission for remarks he made to Charlotte Church during an edition of his afternoon show.

=== August ===
- No events

=== September ===
- 27 September – Les Ross presents his final BRMB Breakfast show, live from Birmingham International station. As 9 o'clock approaches, he hops on a train (hauled by electric locomotive 86259 specially named 'Les Ross' by Virgin Trains West Coast) to symbolise the end. He later preserves this locomotive following its retirement from passenger service.
- 30 September – Rod Liddle resigns as editor of BBC Radio 4's Today programme after the BBC concludes that comments in his column in The Guardian breach his commitment to impartiality as a BBC programme editor.
- Undated in September – The KM Group rebrands its newly acquired Mercury FM stations as KMFM West Kent and KMFM Medway.

=== October ===
- 28 October – The BBC Asian Network is broadcast nationally for the first time after being launched on DAB. The first music played is "Mundian To Bach Ke".

=== November ===
- 11 November – BBC Radio Swindon launches as an opt-out service from Wiltshire Sound which is renamed BBC Radio Wiltshire.
- 12 November – The Radio Authority announces that London station Liberty Radio has lost its licence to Club Asia, which has previously been broadcasting for several hours each day on Spectrum Radio. This is the first time in several years that the incumbent broadcaster's licence has not been renewed. The station has repeatedly only obtained a 0.1% share of listening.
- 17 November – Mark Goodier presents the Top 40 on BBC Radio 1 for the final time on the 50th anniversary of the chart.

=== December ===
- Undated in December – Talksport announces plans for the station's first ever music show. An easy listening music show entitled Champagne & Roses with Gerald Harper, is broadcast each Saturday evening. The show is axed after less than six months.
- 20 December – Sir Jimmy Young presents his final lunchtime programme on BBC Radio 2 after nearly 30 years with the network, and 50 years with the BBC.
- 29 December – 'Doctor' Neil Fox presents the last Pepsi Chart show on Capital 95.8.

== Station debuts ==
- 2 February – BBC Radio 5 Live Sports Extra
- 11 March
  - BBC 6 Music
  - TeamTalk 252
- 19 March – Q101.2
- 25 March – Real Radio Yorkshire
- 1 May – Resonance FM
- 27 May – Smash Hits Radio
- 14 July – 102.5 Radio Pembrokeshire
- 16 August – BBC 1Xtra
- 31 August – Rugby FM
- 22 October – Reading 107
- 28 October – BBC Asian Network on a national platform
- 11 November – BBC Radio Swindon
- 15 December – BBC7

== Programme debuts ==
- 11 March – The Dream Ticket with Janice Long on BBC 6 Music (2002–2004)
- 17 April – Trueman and Riley on BBC Radio 4 (2002, 2005, 2007, 2012)
- 16 July – Giles Wemmbley-Hogg Goes Off on BBC Radio 4 (2002–2011)
- 7 August – Concrete Cow on BBC Radio 4 (2002–2004)
- 24 October – The Sofa of Time on BBC Radio 4 (2004)
- 13 December – Alison and Maud on BBC Radio 4 (2002–2004)
- 15 December – The Big Toe Radio Show on BBC Radio 7 (2002–2011)
- Unknown – A Kist o Wurds on BBC Radio Ulster and BBC Radio Foyle (2002–Present)

== Continuing radio programmes ==
=== 1940s ===
- Sunday Half Hour (1940–2018)
- Desert Island Discs (1942–Present)
- Letter from America (1946–2004)
- Woman's Hour (1946–Present)
- A Book at Bedtime (1949–Present)

=== 1950s ===
- The Archers (1950–Present)
- The Today Programme (1957–Present)
- Your Hundred Best Tunes (1959–2007)

=== 1960s ===
- Farming Today (1960–Present)
- In Touch (1961–Present)
- The World at One (1965–Present)
- The Official Chart (1967–Present)
- Just a Minute (1967–Present)
- The Living World (1968–Present)
- The Organist Entertains (1969–2018)

=== 1970s ===
- PM (1970–Present)
- Start the Week (1970–Present)
- You and Yours (1970–Present)
- I'm Sorry I Haven't a Clue (1972–Present)
- Good Morning Scotland (1973–Present)
- Newsbeat (1973–Present)
- File on 4 (1977–Present)
- Money Box (1977–Present)
- The News Quiz (1977–Present)
- Feedback (1979–Present)
- The Food Programme (1979–Present)
- Science in Action (1979–Present)

=== 1980s ===
- Steve Wright in the Afternoon (1981–1993, 1999–2022)
- In Business (1983–Present)
- Sounds of the 60s (1983–Present)
- Loose Ends (1986–Present)

=== 1990s ===
- The Moral Maze (1990–Present)
- Essential Selection (1991–Present)
- No Commitments (1992–2007)
- Wake Up to Wogan (1993–2009)
- Essential Mix (1993–Present)
- Up All Night (1994–Present)
- Wake Up to Money (1994–Present)
- Private Passions (1995–Present)
- Parkinson's Sunday Supplement (1996–2007)
- The David Jacobs Collection (1996–2013)
- Westway (1997–2005)
- The 99p Challenge (1998–2004)
- Puzzle Panel (1998–2005)
- Sunday Night at 10 (1998–2013)
- Drivetime with Johnnie Walker (1998–2006)
- In Our Time (1998–Present)
- Material World (1998–Present)
- Scott Mills (1998–2022)
- The Now Show (1998–Present)
- It's Been a Bad Week (1999–2006)
- Jonathan Ross (1999–2010)

=== 2000s ===
- Dead Ringers (2000–2007, 2014–Present)
- BBC Radio 2 Folk Awards (2000–Present)
- Sounds of the 70s (2000–2008, 2009–Present)
- Big John @ Breakfast (2000–Present)
- Comedy Album Heroes (2001–2003)
- Think the Unthinkable (2001–2005)
- Parsons and Naylor's Pull-Out Sections (2001–2007)
- Jammin' (2001–2008)
- Go4It (2001–2009)
- The Jo Whiley Show (2001–2011)
- Kermode and Mayo's Film Review (2001–2022)

== Ending this year ==
- 5 February – Little Britain (2000–2002)
- March – The Human Zoo (2000–2002)
- 20 March – The Attractive Young Rabbi (1999–2002)
- 12 June – The Leopard in Autumn (2001–2002)
- July – Linda Smith's A Brief History of Timewasting (2001–2002)
- 29 December – The Pepsi Chart (1993–2002)

== Closing this year ==
- January – Atlantic 252 (1989–2002)
- 31 July – TeamTalk 252 (2002)

== Deaths ==
- 12 January – Stanley Unwin, 90, comedian, creator of "Unwinese"
- 24 February – Martin Esslin, 83, drama producer
- 27 February – Spike Milligan, 83, comedian and writer, writer/performer of The Goon Show
- 31 March – Barry Took, 73, comedy writer and broadcast presenter
- 10 May – Austen Kark, 75, managing director, BBC World Service, killed in Potters Bar rail accident
- 24 July – Maurice Denham, 92, character actor
- 27 November – Stanley Black, 89, pianist, bandleader, composer, conductor and arranger
- 1 December – Michael Oliver, 65, radio arts presenter
