= Touch FM =

British radio network

The Touch FM network was a group of Independent Local Radio stations owned by Quidem. The network included stations in Coventry, South Staffordshire, Warwick, Stratford-upon-Avon, Nuneaton & Hinckley, Loughborough, Banbury and Rugby.

The network of stations are listed below.

- Touch FM (Coventry), formerly Kix 96
- Touch FM (Stratford-upon-Avon), formerly The Bear 102
- Touch FM (Warwick)
- Touch FM (Burton, Lichfield and Tamworth), formerly Centre FM
- 107.1 Rugby FM
- Banbury Sound, formerly Touch FM 107.6

Oak FM, which served the Hinckley, Nuneaton and Loughborough areas, was formerly owned by the Lincs FM Group until 2012, when it was acquired by Quidem. Oak FM and Touch FM (Burton, Lichfield and Tamworth) broadcast from a studio centre in Coalville, Leicestershire. Oak FM was sold to ATR Media in 2015 and later ceased broadcasting in July 2016 after running into financial difficulties.

All of Quidem's stations were broadcast from a studio in Honiley, near Kenilworth in Warwickshire.

== Station rebrands ==
In September 2019, Quidem announced it had entered a brand licensing agreement with Global, citing financial losses. Two months later, following permission from regulator, Ofcom to change the station's format, it was confirmed that Quidem's stations would merge and launch as Capital Mid-Counties on 2 December 2019.

The Touch FM stations, Rugby FM and Banbury Sound ceased broadcasting at 7pm on Friday 29 November 2019.
