= Capital Mid-Counties =

- United Kingdom
- Frequencies: DAB: 12D Arqiva Coventry and Warwickshire; FM: 96.2 MHz Coventry and Nuneaton; 101.6 MHz Lichfield; 102.0 MHz Stratford; 102.4 MHz Burton-upon-Trent and Uttoxeter; 107.1 MHz Rugby; 107.3 MHz Warwickshire; 107.6 MHz Banbury and Brackley
- RDS: Capital

Programming
- Format: Contemporary hit radio
- Network: Capital

Ownership
- Owner: Global
- Operator: Global
- Sister stations: Capital Midlands

History
- First air date: 2 December 2019

Links
- Webcast: Global Player
- Website: Capital Coventry; Capital North Oxfordshire; Capital Rugby; Capital South East Staffordshire; Capital Stratford; Capital Warwick

Capital Mid-Counties is a regional radio station owned and operated by Global as part of the Capital network. It broadcasts to Coventry, Warwickshire, Worcestershire, south Staffordshire, the Cotswolds and north Oxfordshire.

The station launched on 2 December 2019 as a franchise owned by Quidem, following the merger of six stations, including Touch FM, Rugby FM and Banbury Sound.

The station transferred to Global ownership in August 2021.

== History ==
Under relaxed OFCOM requirements for local content on commercial radio, Capital Mid-Counties is permitted to share all programming between the six licences, all located within the approved area of the Midlands.

These licences previously broadcast as separate stations:

- Radio Harmony began broadcasting to Coventry and Warwickshire in August 1990, later rebranding to 'Kix 96' in 1995.
- FM102 The Bear began broadcasting to Warwickshire, Worcestershire and The Cotswolds from studios in Stratford-upon-Avon in May 1996.
- Centre FM began broadcasting to south east Staffordshire and South Derbyshire from studios in Tamworth in June 1998.
- 107.1 Rugby FM began broadcasting to Rugby and surrounding areas in August 2002.
- Banbury Sound began broadcasting to north Oxfordshire in February 2006 as Touch FM.
- 107.3 Touch Radio began broadcasting to the Warwick, Leamington Spa and Kenilworth areas of Warwickshire in April 2008.

By 2006, The Bear 102, Centre FM and Kix 96 were rebranded by then-owners CN Group as Touch FM - with similar branding adopted by the Warwick and Banbury stations upon their launch. In the same year, the CN Group acquired Rugby FM and transferred its operations to a regional broadcast centre in Kenilworth, Warwickshire.

In 2009, the CN Group sold off its radio interests in the Midlands. The Banbury station was sold to a private consortium in a staff buyout in April and subsequently rebranded as a wholly independent operation, Banbury Sound. In June, the four Touch FM stations and Rugby FM were sold for an undisclosed price to Quidem, a newly established company set up by former GCap Media directors Steve Orchard and Wendy Pallot.

The new owners introduced a new format identified on-air as Classic Hits and The Best Of Today with live breakfast shows and voicetracked Drivetime shows for each licence area. In October 2010, Quidem reacquired Banbury Sound, which co-located to Quidem's main studios at Honiley in Warwickshire and reintroduced networked output but retained its separate branding.

From 2012 until 2016, Touch FM's service for Burton, Lichfield & Tamworth was broadcast from studios in Coalville, Leicestershire, shared with Oak FM (sold off by Quidem in 2015) until shortly after that station's sudden closure, when it moved to the Honiley studios.

In September 2019, Quidem announced it had entered a brand licensing agreement with Global, citing financial losses. The agreement allows the group to carry the branding and programming from one of Global's radio networks while retaining ownership of its six licences - effectively being operated as franchises.

Two months later, OFCOM granted permission for Quidem to change the licensed Formats of its local stations to "a rhythmic-based music-led service for 15-29 year-olds supplemented with news, information and entertainment" - a move which brought the stations into line with the formats of Global's Capital network.

On 27 November 2019, it was confirmed the six Quidem stations would merge and join the Capital network on Monday 2 December 2019. Touch FM, Rugby FM and Banbury Sound ceased broadcasting at 7pm on Friday 29 November 2019.

Regional programming on the station consisted of a three-hour Drivetime show on weekdays, alongside localised opt-outs for news bulletins, traffic updates and advertising. All other local output was replaced with networked programming from London. Local news output for Capital Mid-Counties is produced by Global.

From 24 February 2025, the drive time show was likewise replaced with networked programming from London.

== Programming ==
All programming is broadcast and produced from Global's London headquarters.

Global's newsroom broadcasts hourly localised news updates from 6am-6pm on weekdays and 8am-12pm at weekends.
