= Touch FM (Burton, Lichfield and Tamworth) =

Former British radio station

Tamworth; England
- Broadcast area: South East Staffordshire
- Frequencies: 101.6 & 102.4 FM

Programming
- Format: AC

Ownership
- Owner: Quidem Ltd

History
- First air date: 6 June 1998
- Last air date: 29 November 2019

Links
- Website: http://www.101touchfm.co.uk/

Touch FM was an Independent Local Radio station broadcasting to Burton, Lichfield, Tamworth and South Derbyshire, England.

== Centre FM ==
Centre FM was created as the result of work by the Tamworth Community Radio Association. It was formed in 1993 with the purpose of developing a community radio station for the town and its surrounding areas. In 1996, TCRA, with a group of local businessmen and radio presenters, formed Centre Broadcasting Ltd to apply for the commercial broadcasting licence for South East Staffordshire. In addition to this, there was another rival bid from Burton-based Tower FM, who also did reading books for the blind. Considering there was interest in Burton and Swadlincote and Tamworth and Lichfield, both areas were merged by the Radio Authority.

Centre FM launched on 6 June 1998, from studios at 5-6 Aldergate, Tamworth. Upon its launch, The board consisted of Ric Simon of TCRA, local business leader Keith Hayes, representatives of Central Independent Newspapers, and ITV Central news anchorman Bob Warman. At one point, Capital Radio held shares in the station, selling them, along with those of Stratford-upon-Avon based The Bear, on 11 April 2001.

In April 2002, it was acquired by The CN Group, which, on 29 April 2006, re-branded the station as Touch FM.

=== Programming ===
The original line-up in 1998 was Sean Goldsmith at breakfast, Mike Vitti on mid-mornings, Hayley Chapman on afternoons and Antony Masters (Big T’s Big Night) in the evening, with Mike Thomas as news editor. The strapline was 'One Great Song After Another'. Apart from Vitti, the original line-up had left by the end of 2000. Sean Goldsmith left for Hallam FM, Antony Masters left for FOX FM and Mike Thomas left in 2001 for the launch of Saga 105.7 FM in Birmingham, but returned to the station between 2005 and 2007. No overnight presenters were employed, instead non-stop music was played straight from a computer.

Later, Centre FM's strapline was "We Only Play the Best Music".

== Touch FM ==
Under the CN Group, the station was re-launched as Touch FM in 2006 leaving behind almost eight years of heritage in South East Staffordshire. Touch FM was launched at 12:00 BST on Saturday 29 April 2006. The on-air launch was marked at Coopers Square Shopping Centre in Burton-upon-Trent, and was hosted by breakfast presenter Dave James with an appearance by the Sugababes. The re-branding of Centre FM made it the fourth station to join the new Touch Radio Network. Kix 96.2 and The Bear were re-branded earlier that year, with a new station for Banbury also launching Touch FM on 25 February 2006.

In 2009, the station was acquired by the Quidem group, which introduced new idents, a revised logo and changed the strapline to "Classic Hits and the Best Of Today".

The station broadcast from Aldergate in Tamworth town centre until it moved to a studio complex in Coalville in 2012, following Quidem's acquisition of Oak FM, already based there, from the Lincs FM Group. In August 2016, it received permission from OFCOM to move studios to Kenilworth in Warwickshire.

In September 2019, Quidem announced it had entered a brand licensing agreement with Global, citing financial losses. Two months later, following permission from regulator, Ofcom to change the station's format, it was confirmed Touch FM (Burton, Lichfield and Tamworth) would merge its Quidem-owned sister stations and launch as Capital Mid-Counties on 2 December 2019.

Local output for the Mid-Counties region consists of a three-hour regional Drivetime show on weekdays, alongside localised news bulletins, traffic updates and advertising for south east Staffordshire and south Derbyshire. Touch FM ceased broadcasting at 7pm on Friday 29 November 2019.

== Transmitters ==
Touch FM used two transmitters to cover Lichfield, Tamworth and Burton. One was at the Lichfield transmitting station, which broadcast on 101.6 FM at a power of 60 watts to Lichfield and Tamworth, and another transmitter was at Winshill water tower on 102.4 FM. This covered Burton and South Derbyshire at a power of 90 watts. Even though the station was meant to cover South East Staffordshire and South Derbyshire, it could also be heard on some parts of the M6 through the West Midlands and through most of Derby.

== See also ==
- Touch Radio (Coventry)
- Touch Radio (Stratford-upon-Avon)
- Touch Radio (Warwick)
- 107.1 Rugby FM
