= Will Brooker =

Film and television scholar

Will Brooker is a writer and academic, professor of film and cultural studies at Kingston University and an author of several books of cultural studies dealing with elements of modern pop culture and fandom, specifically Batman, Star Wars and Alice in Wonderland.

== Academic career ==
Brooker completed his BA (Hons) in film and English studies at the University of East Anglia in Norwich in 1991, and completed his PhD in cultural studies at Cardiff University in 1999. The title of his thesis was "One Life, Many Faces: The Uses and Meanings of the Batman, 1939–1999". Brooker also completed a postgraduate diploma in communication at Goldsmiths, where he is now recognised as one of a select group of notable alumni.

Brooker has worked at Kingston University since 2005. From 2005 until 2007 he was senior lecturer and field leader for film studies, and from 2007 until 2009 he served as principal lecturer and director of studies for film and television. He was promoted to reader in 2009 and professor in 2013. On 1 January 2013, Brooker became the first British editor of Cinema Journal since the publication was established in 1967. His five-year term ran until 31 December 2017.

== Publications ==
Brooker's first major monograph, Batman Unmasked: Analyzing a Cultural Icon, was published in 2001. The book is a series of essays on the comic book superhero Batman, an expansion of Brooker's PhD thesis. The essays are each centred on a different period of Batman's history, drawing out the key elements that differ from period to period, as well as those that remain constant. Entertainment Weekly describes Batman Unmasked as "cutting through the mumbo jumbo...to deliver incisive analysis and very sharp reporting." Brooker engages with the major dialogues surrounding the topic, including the question of Batman's role as a patriotic figure, questions of his sexuality and the role of Batman as a viable queer text, to the point where Popmatters refers to it as "less an analysis of the Batman than a repudiation of a number of other texts that support DC's "official" reading of the character".

Brooker went on to publish Using the Force: Creativity, Community and Star Wars Fans in 2002, Alice's Adventures: Lewis Carroll in Popular Culture in 2005 and The Blade Runner Experience: The Legacy of a Science Fiction Classic in 2006. More recently, he has written the BFI Film Classics edition Star Wars, which received positive reviews in Empire magazine and The Guardian.

Between August 2011 and March 2012, Brooker was a regular film, television and culture commentator for the Times Higher Education magazine. His reviews and articles during this period included The Girl with the Dragon Tattoo (2011), We Need To Talk About Kevin (2011), One Day (2011), J.Edgar (2012), the Twilight series (2008–2012), Dr. Who (2005–present) and the X Factor.

With the release of Christopher Nolan's third Batman film, The Dark Knight Rises, and the publication of his book Hunting the Dark Knight: Twenty-First Century Batman, Brooker published several high-profile articles on the character, including contributions to SFX, The Huffington Post, Newsweek, The Guardian, Total Film and The Independent. His work was also quoted in The New York Post. Hunting the Dark Knight was well received by SFX magazine: 'Taking multi-faceted tilts at a multi-faceted character, Brooker elicits oodles of thinkers, critics and fans as back-up for his ideas. He also packs a loaded Bat-belt of theories and themes, roving from 'queer' slants to 'paratexts' to pizza tie-ins and beyond... Brooker's enthused rigour is infectious.'

In early 2013 Brooker teamed up with Suze Shore and Dr. Sarah Zaidan to create an online comic book series entitled My So Called Secret Identity. The comic has been critically acclaimed and celebrated by The Guardian, Times Higher Education, and Ms Magazine due to its reimagining of women in comics through the main character, Cat, who is average in every way except for being "really, really goddamn smart." Despite the high praise for My So Called Secret Identity, Shore, Zaidan, and Brooker have chosen to measure the success of the comic by responses "from individuals who have connected with Cat and her story, and told us how much it means to them, to the extent that it's even inspired them, changed their approach to life and given them more confidence." In addition to paving the way for more realistic and empowering representations of women in comics, the team behind My So Called Secret Identity have also taken steps to support women in a very practical way: My So Called Secret Identity is a crowd funded project which gives a portion of the funds raised to women's refuge charity A Way Out

My So Called Secret Identity's success has led to both Brooker and Zaidan being invited to contribute to the British Library's Comics Unmasked exhibition. Brooker and Zaidan will join comics' greats Warren Ellis and Grant Morrison as panellists in the (Super)Hero with 1000 Faces panel on 16 June 2014 to discuss the importance of superheroes to the comics medium. My So Called Secret Identity has also been noticed by the London fashion magazine Stylist, who ran a feature--"Comic Books: Not Just for the Boys"—that highlighted My So Called Secret Identity and included brand new MSCSI content.

In November 2013, following "Magic Words: An Evening With Alan Moore", Brooker criticised Moore's short film An Act of Faith on Twitter for its representation of sexualised violence. He also raised concerns about Kevin O'Neill's suggestion that the "Golliwog" from League of Extraordinary Gentlemen: The Black Dossier, is "an incredibly powerful black character", and Moore's description of former Prime Minister Gordon Brown as a "bipolar Cyclops". Moore responded to Brooker and other critics in a lengthy interview in which Moore referred to Brooker as "a Batman scholar." Brooker responded online on Sequart Organization. Dave Sim reflected upon the controversy, suggesting that although he feels that it is difficult to find fault with Alan Moore's "bottom line", he "can't see why Dr. Brooker shouldn't vent about" the content of Moore's work.

== Appearances in the media ==
While first completing his PhD and then expanding it into Batman Unmasked, Will Brooker received a degree of media coverage unusual for an academic, much of it negative, and was interviewed about his work on Touch Radio. In 1999, Brooker celebrated the Caped Crusader's 60th birthday with Phill Jupitus on the latter's Radio 4 programme 'Happy Birthday Batman'. In 2005, he appeared as himself in the TV Documentary "Generation Jedi", and in 2011 he was featured in Acafandom and Beyond, an article on the blog of Henry Jenkins, Provost's Professor of Communication, Journalism, and Cinematic Arts at the University of Southern California. He has also been an invited expert on various television programmes, including ITV's Movie Mansions, Channel 5's Gloria's Full House, on which he spoke alongside Adam West and Paul Daniels, and he has debated Star Wars with Mark Kermode on BBC Two's The Culture Show. He has also been interviewed twice on the online Jeff Rubin Show. In his first appearance, he explained his current work and his opinion of Joel Schumacher's Batman films and, in the second, he discussed Christopher Nolan's The Dark Knight Rises. In 2015 Brooker wrote for the New Statesman magazine about his support for feminism and has received media attention over his research for an academic analysis of David Bowie's life and work, Forever Stardust. In particular he has received attention from the Guardian, and Rolling Stone, for his endeavour to approximate Bowie's experiences in his own life.
