= Touch FM (Coventry) =

Defunct English independent radio station

96.2 Touch FM
Coventry, Warwickshire, England; England
- Broadcast area: Coventry, England
- Frequency: 96.2 MHz FM

Programming
- Format: AC
- Network: Touch FM

Ownership
- Owner: Quidem Ltd

History
- First air date: 28 August 1990
- Last air date: 29 November 2019

Links
- Website: 962touchfm.co.uk

96.2 Touch FM was an Independent Local Radio station serving Coventry and Warwickshire, in the West Midlands, England. The station broadcast from studios at Honiley, near Kenilworth, on 96.2 FM and online.

== History ==
The station originally launched as Radio Harmony on 28 August 1990 on 102.6 MHz FM. In January 1995, it rebranded as Kix 96 and changed frequency to 96.2 MHz FM. Under the management of Muff Murfin, Kix earned a reputation as a training ground for some of the UK radio industry's up-and-coming talents including Chris Brooks, Dave Kelly, and Perry Spillar. Nic Tuff was the station's launch programme controller and breakfast presenter, who is probably best-remembered for a 1998 April Fools' joke in which he called Nelson Mandela at home, pretending to be Tony Blair. The stunt attracted some attention from the international press.

=== CN Group acquisition ===
The CN Group lobbied the government regulatory body Ofcom in 2005 to amend the station's format in order to bring it closer to the adult-contemporary formats of its sister stations in the South Midlands (all later rebranded as Touch FM). One of the proposed changes included a request for the removal of the obligation to provide a weekly programme of Irish music. An objection from Coventry rivals Mercia FM contributed towards Ofcom rejecting the request. As a result, the station's format obligations dictated a different playlist to that of the other members of the Touch network, but nonetheless, the station adopted at that point a more adult sound than that prior to CN ownership. The station was issued a 'yellow card' by Ofcom in April 2006 for a violation of the 'spirit of its format' following a decision to move the Irish music programme to an 'inaccessible' overnight time slot.

=== Quidem acquisition ===
On 18 June 2009, it was announced that a group fronted by former G-Cap Media Operations Director Steve Orchard had bought the CN Radio Midland Stations. He set up the group known as 'Quidem'. On 1 December 2009, Touch Radio was rebranded to Touch FM.

=== Flip to Adult Hits Format ===
On Friday, 21 March 2014 at 5:10 pm the station was "seized" during normal programming and a loop of the Queen hit Bohemian Rhapsody was played consistently until 10 am the following Monday morning. At this point, a launch sequence played, confirming the station was relaunching with a new, male-skewed rock format, giving it a distinctive sound compared to the more female-skewed Global Radio and Orion Media operated brands in the area. It then only had presenters between 6 am and 9 am and 4 pm and 7 pm weekdays, and 8 am to 2 pm weekends, and there was no longer any networking taken.

In 2016, Touch FM reverted to its original Adult Contemporary theme, applying the slogan of its sister stations 'Classic Hits and the Best of Today'.

In October 2016, the station started broadcasting a local arts magazine programme, The Coventry Culture Show. This was a hit with listeners, and in January 2017, the show was extended to four hours. In January 2019, The Coventry Culture Show also aired on Sunday morning in addition to its traditional Saturday slot. Presenter Neil Wilkes announced via social media that he had ended the radio show early, due to changes at the station. Shortly after this, it was publicly announced that Touch FM would cease broadcasting.

=== Station rebrand and merger ===
In September 2019, Quidem announced it had entered a brand licensing agreement with Global, citing financial losses. Two months later, following permission from regulator, Ofcom to change the station's format, it was confirmed Touch FM (Coventry) would merge with its Quidem-owned sister stations and launch as Capital Mid-Counties on 2 December 2019.

Local output for the Mid-Counties region consists of a three-hour regional Drivetime show on weekdays, alongside localised news bulletins, traffic updates, and advertising for Coventry and Warwickshire. Touch FM ceased broadcasting at 7 pm on Friday 29 November 2019.

== See also ==
- Touch Radio (Stratford-upon-Avon)
- Touch Radio (Warwick)
- Touch Radio (Burton, Lichfield and Tamworth)
- 107.1 Rugby FM
- Banbury Sound
