= Ridings FM =

Former radio station in West Yorkshire, England

Coordinates: 53.567°N 1.514°W

- England
- Broadcast area: Wakefield
- Frequency: FM: 106.8 MHz

Programming
- Format: Classic Hits

Ownership
- Owner: Bauer

History
- First air date: 3 October 1999
- Last air date: 31 August 2020

Ridings FM was an Independent Local Radio station serving the Wakefield District of West Yorkshire. The station was folded into Greatest Hits Radio West Yorkshire, as part of a rebrand, on 1 September 2020.

== Studios ==
The station was originally based at Thornes Office Park in Wakefield before co-locating with sister station Dearne FM at Zenith Park on Whaley Road, Barugh Green, in the north-west of Barnsley in 2009.

Following a memorandum sent to Ofcom, which stated that the station had never made a profit although being a technical success, Ridings FM was moved to Doncaster where it shared a building with Trax FM, Dearne FM and Rother FM.

== Transmission ==
The station's transmitter was originally located at Birkwood Farm between Stanley and Altofts. It was later moved to Wakefield House in Wakefield city centre. Ridings FM broadcast on 106.8 FM on 500 watts of power. From July 2001, it was made available on the Bauer Leeds DAB multiplex. This service was discontinued in 2013, due to limitations in coverage across its service area and high transmission costs.

== FM licence ==
Prior to being awarded the Wakefield licence, the station ran a trial service which ran from 11 October 1997 on 87.7 FM.

By the closing date of 8 September 1998, WF 107 Ltd (based in Wakefield), Henna FM Ltd (based in Batley providing Asian music) and Ridings FM had applied to the Radio Authority for the licence. Ridings FM was later awarded the licence on 7 January 1999.

== Programming ==
The station's output included a weekday breakfast show. The station's news team won a Sony Bronze award in May 2000. At off peak times the station used the feed from Independent Radio News. As well as news, Ridings FM covered local sports teams from the Wakefield Trinity, Castleford Tigers and Featherstone Rovers in rugby league, to Ossett United (amalgamation of Ossett Albion and Ossett Town) and Frickley Athletic in football.

== Presenters ==
During Ridings FM's lifetime, presenters included:

- Phil Butler
- Gareth Webb
- Paul Bromley
- John Tolson
- Jamie Fletcher
- Chris Hubbard
- Kev Wilson
- Andy Hoyle
