= Ellie Williams =

Ellie Williams may refer to:

- Eleanor Williams (criminal) (born 2000), a British woman convicted of making false allegations of multiple serious crimes
- Ellie (The Last of Us), a character in the video game The Last of Us
