= Fosseway Radio =

Former Independent Local Radio station in Leicestershire, United Kingdom

Hinckley, Leicestershire; England
- Broadcast area: Hinckley and Nuneaton
- Frequency: 107.9 MHz

Programming
- Format: Contemporary

Ownership
- Owner: Lincs FM Group

History
- First air date: 1 November 1998
- Last air date: 26 March 2008

Fosseway Radio was an Independent Local Radio station based in Leicestershire, and owned by Lincs FM Group. It served the south-west of that county, as well as North Warwickshire. It was based on Castle Street in Hinckley. The name of the station referred to the nearby Fosse Way, which marks the frontier of Roman Britain. It runs between Lincoln and Leicester, then on to Bath and Exeter. In Leicestershire, the best-preserved section is a 4-mile stretch close to the market town of Hinckley, from High Cross to Stoney Bridge near Sapcote.

== History ==
Fosseway Radio had an enviable and impressive heritage of local involvement and local broadcasting stretching well over twenty years. Studio equipment was basic and often home-made but the group had clear determination to produce a local radio service for the people of Hinckley, broadcasting under the name of Fosseway Radio.

The group produced music tapes, which were distributed to several factories and workplaces across the Hinckley area. They raised several thousand pounds for local charities, including The Dorothy Goodman Special School and Park House Home for the Elderly in Earl Shilton. So unique was the project that Malcolm Munro from Central Television visited the 'home-built' studios in Thornycroft Road in 1982 and the aspirations and clear enthusiasm of the group were featured on Central News.

Their aspirations were to see a truly local radio service for their home area. Disillusioned by events in the Leicestershire radio market and the subsequent collapse of Centre Radio, the group turned their attentions to building their individual careers, although maintaining their strong interest in local radio.

In the late 1980s, several members of the group were invited by the local health authority to launch a voluntary hospital radio service for the town's cottage hospital. This was Castle Mead Radio and it is still going strong today, 20 years after launching. Interest in providing a service to the wider community remained and in 1993, Andy Carter wrote to the Radio Authority, on behalf of the group, to register their interest in providing a commercial radio service for their home area, an area very much betwixt and between Coventry and Leicester.

In October 1994, the Radio Authority announced that it intended to place Hinckley on their 'working list' and much progress was made in gaining public support and interest. The group decided their commitment to distinctive local radio would be best demonstrated by operating a trial broadcast and in early 1995, Andrew Carter, Lee Carey, Jon Maynard and Maria Bush decided that Fosseway Radio should apply to operate Hinckley's first trial local radio station. The process of initial, informal research began and contact with local businesses became a priority to finance the operation. The company was officially registered in October 1995.

Fosseway Radio launched its first trial service on 1 March 1996 to an expectant town. Its strengths would be its local knowledge of the area, local talent and to make it stand out from the rest of the FM stations of the time. Presenters knew and understood the area and judging by the response, Hinckley was by no means disappointed. Nita Baines from Barwell wrote to say, "I really cannot thank you enough for bringing some sunshine back into my life, I hope it is summertime forever", while Pat and Barrie Parker from Hinckley told the station, "Everyone is talking about Fosseway Radio and what a happier month March has been for having it."

Many listeners told the station of their delight when the service resumed for a second month in September 1996. Carolyn Loveridge wrote to say: "Thank you once again for providing a professional and excellent service for South-West Leicestershire". Angel Gould, a leader at 1st Barwell Cubs, wrote to say she had discovered the station quite by chance and on questioning her cubs that evening she was surprised that a lot of them were already listening to Fosseway Radio, "I hope the message gets through that they and myself like listening to Fosseway Radio and long may it continue".

Hinckley's geographical location, equidistant between the two strong cities of Leicester and Coventry, resulted in the area being overlooked and often ignored. The area was too distant to be a suburb and held an identity of its own, an ideal location for a new commercial radio station.

In 1998, the Fosseway Radio team were delivered the news by the broadcasting authorities that they had been successful in their application, and the station launched on 1 November that year.

The transmitter was in the village of Barwell, but the station principally served the towns (and suburbs) of Hinckley and Nuneaton.

In 1999, the success of the station meant the coverage area was extended to the town of Nuneaton.

Nine years later, parent company the Lincs FM Group made their first acquisition, Oak 107 FM, from the CN Group. However, it was decided that this new service should also replace Fosseway Radio in Hinckley and Nuneaton, and Oak FM took control of the transmitter on Wednesday 26 March 2008. The two stations merged and originally maintained individual services for the two respective areas. This was however quickly altered, with programmes being shared outside of the breakfast show. Both the Hinckley and Loughborough services were co-located in Coalville in July 2008, and the breakfast shows also became networked in the summer of 2010, one of the first concessions allowed by the OFCOM Digital Economy Bill of the same year.
