= Touch FM (Stratford-upon-Avon) =

102 Touch FM

Stratford Upon Avon; England
- Broadcast area: Warwickshire, Worcestershire and The Cotswolds
- Frequency: 102.0 MHz

Programming
- Format: AC
- Network: Touch FM

Ownership
- Owner: Quidem Ltd

History
- First air date: 24 May 1996
- Last air date: 29 November 2019

Technical information
- Transmitter coordinates: 52.0816°N 1.7286°W

Links
- Website: 102 Touch FM

102 Touch FM was an Independent Local Radio station broadcasting to the town of Stratford-upon-Avon and much of the counties of Warwickshire, Worcestershire, The Cotswolds and the surrounding area in the south of the English Midlands.

== History ==
The station, which launched in 1996 as FM102 The Bear and was later known as The Bear 102, was taken over by Cumbria-based CN Group in 2001 and relaunched, along with Kix 96 in Coventry, as Touch FM on 16 January 2006.

In June 2009, the Touch Radio Network of stations (together with Rugby FM) were purchased from CN Group by Quidem Midlands Limited. 102 Touch Radio was then re-branded to 102 Touch FM.

In March 2011, Touch FM and Quidem were nominated for two Sony Radio Academy Awards – "The First Break Show" in the Best Specialist Music programme category and the "Coventry Blitz Special" in the Best News Special category . The station won the Radio Academy Nations & Regions Award for the Midlands Station of the Year in 2012-13 and 2013–14 and was nominated for the Sony Radio Academy Awards Station of the Year in 2013. Touch FM's Pride of Stratford Awards won the Arqiva Commercial Radio marketing award in 2012.

In September 2019, Quidem announced it had entered a brand licensing agreement with Global, citing financial losses. Two months later, following permission from regulator, Ofcom to change the station's format, it was confirmed Touch FM (Stratford-upon-Avon) would merge with its Quidem-owned sister stations and launch as Capital Mid-Counties on 2 December 2019.

Local output for the Mid-Counties region consists of a three-hour regional Drivetime show on weekdays, alongside localised news bulletins, traffic updates and advertising. Touch FM ceased broadcasting at 7pm on Friday 29 November 2019.

== See also ==
- Banbury Sound
- Touch Radio (Coventry)
- Touch Radio (Warwick)
- Touch Radio (Burton, Lichfield and Tamworth)
- 107.1 Rugby FM
