= Oak 107 FM =

Former Independent Local Radio station in Loughborough, UK

England
- Broadcast area: Loughborough
- Frequency: 107.0 MHz

Programming
- Format: Contemporary

Ownership
- Owner: Lincs FM Group

History
- First air date: 14 February 1999

This is the page for the defunct CN Group station. For the service operated by Quidem see The New 107 Oak FM.

Oak 107 FM was an Independent Local Radio station owned by the CN Group and based on Prince William Road in Loughborough, Leicestershire in the UK.

== History ==
Oak 107 was launched with Nic Tuff in 1999 as 107 Oak FM. The name was changed to OAK 107 in November 2002 and again to Oak 107 FM in 2004. The station played a variety of songs from the 2000s, 1990s, 1980s and, sometimes, the 1970s.

In 2003, the station supported the "Give The Luffs a Lease" campaign in favour of Loughborough Football Club's attempt to secure a long-term lease for the site of its stadium. The Radio Authority (now Ofcom) ruled that this "was acceptable because the station was satisfied that the vast majority of its listeners would support it and the issue was not made into a political controversy".

The station was purchased by the Lincs FM Group in October 2007 and merged with Lincs FM's existing station, Fosseway Radio which was based in Hinckley. Both services were rebranded as Oak FM on 26 March 2008 with both the Hinckley and Loughborough services being co-located in Coalville in July 2008.

For the new merged service, see Oak FM.
