= Chuffer Dandridge =

Fictional Shakespearean actor-manager

Chuffer Dandridge was a fictional Shakespearean actor-manager, whose emails were frequently read out by Terry Wogan on his BBC Radio 2 breakfast show Wake Up to Wogan, which aired from 1993 until 2009.

Dandridge was created by fans of the show, Roger Byrne and Charles Slane, who described him as a "semi-retired Actor-Manager in search of a big break". Like several other contributors, they chose a humorous pseudonym after many listeners had used double entendres in names to catch Wogan out. The pair emailed new material on a daily basis, which Wogan would then read out on his show, sometimes corpsing with laughter along with colleagues Paul Walters, Alan Dedicoat and John "Boggy" Marsh. The character was retired along with Wogan leaving the Radio 2 breakfast slot in 2009, although the character did return briefly the following year on Wogan's weekend show, Weekend Wogan.

Dandridge misreported news and travel stories, interspersing them with a humorous monologue of his acting career. He frequently name dropped colleagues he claimed to meet in the theatre, and a regular in-joke was him complaining about being owed a white fiver (pre-1957 £5 note) he lent a colleague when both were in repertory theatre. Wogan subsequently published some of the email transcripts in his autobiographies; in one, Dandridge compared the Eurovision Song Contest, which Wogan had presented for many years, to "a cabaret in pre-war Berlin, where I was naked, painted in zebra stripes and sitting bareback on a horse".

David Sillito, Arts Correspondent for the BBC, suggested Dandridge was created to appeal to Wogan's love of author P. G. Wodehouse. Wogan thought Dandridge's monologues parodied Donald Sinden and his character, optimistically hoping to revive his showbusiness career, was based on Charles Dickens' Samuel Pickwick. Byrne and Slane eventually met Wogan at a bookstore signing in Dublin, surprising the latter who expected the pair to be significantly older.
