= Eleanor Williams (criminal) =

English criminal (born 2000)

- Williams used a hammer to inflict injuries on herself, then posted photos on Facebook claiming someone had attacked her.
- Born: 26 November 2000 (age 25)
- Known for: Making false claims of rape, grooming and trafficking
- Status: Released early on licence
- Criminal charge: Nine counts of perverting the course of justice
- Penalty: Eight and a half years imprisonment

Details
- Span of crimes: 2017–2020
- Date apprehended: July 2019 (first arrest) and May 2020 (second arrest)

Eleanor Williams (born 26 November 2000) is an English convicted criminal, from Barrow-in-Furness, Cumbria, England who made supposed false claims of multiple serious crimes, including accusations of trafficking, rape by a group of men of Asian descent, blackmail, and physical violence, none of which were found to have occurred. Following her 2022 trial, Williams was found guilty on nine counts of perverting the course of justice, contrary to English common law. She was sentenced to eight and a half years in prison, but was released early on licence after serving one year and ten months.

The alleged fictitious claims spread by Williams on the internet had lasting impacts, including multiple attempted suicides and a rise in racially motivated violence against the Asian community, and contributed to aspects of the Online Safety Act 2023, which criminalises the spread of harmful false information online.

== Background ==
Eleanor Williams was born on 26 November 2000. Williams reportedly had difficulties in her childhood and self-harmed from a young age. Growing up, in Barrow-in-Furness, Cumbria, Williams' parents separated and she did not see her father often. She stated that she did not get along with her stepfather or mother, stating it was the reason that she moved out of their address to live in her own flat. At the time of her trial, she was living in Teasdale Road on Walney Island.

== Investigation ==
=== First allegation ===
In 2017, aged 16, Williams made an allegation against a male individual, named as 'C' in court proceedings. During an informal event at his house, Williams became drunk and smoked cannabis. She was sick and C, along with others, called for her to be picked up. Williams' mother collected her, taking her to hospital.

Whilst in hospital, Williams alleged to staff that she had been raped. She spoke to Cumbria Police about the allegation, stating that C had threatened to set his dog on her and kill her, disposing of her body either in his garden or at sea.

C was arrested in November 2017 and was released after being interviewed. In January 2018, Williams withdrew her support for the prosecution and C faced no further police action.

=== Second, third and fourth allegations ===
In 2019, Williams made three allegations against Jordan Trengove. After a night out with Trengove, on 8 and into 9 March 2019, Williams alleged that Trengove had taken her to an address and raped her.

On 6 May Williams called police, stating she had been attacked that day. Whilst feigning reluctance to tell police what had happened, she later made the allegation about what happened in March and also on 6 May. In relation to 6 May, Williams stated that Trengove had arrived at her flat and after not leaving, had threatened her with a knife, beat her with a shower head and raped her. Williams presented with bruises on her legs. Police arrested and interviewed Trengove, before he was bailed.

On 18 May 2019, Williams called police again, stating that she had returned to her flat after a night out and Trengove had entered her flat through a door she had left unlocked for a friend. She alleged Trengove had hit her face and body, before raping her. Police located her with injuries. Trengove was arrested and remanded in custody until August 2019.

=== Fifth allegation ===
In June 2019, Williams was reported missing a number of times, being located each time by police. When police located her, Williams was either intoxicated through alcohol or drugs or had injuries, including bruising. Police had significant concerns in connection with this.

Williams was further interviewed by police in July 2019, disclosing further allegations. She stated that when she was younger, she attended parties at houses where older men were present. She stated that she was introduced to a male known as 'Rammy' when she was 12 years old, and that she had worked in his Indian restaurant. 'Rammy' was local businessman Mohammed Ramzan. Williams stated that he began grooming her and allegedly told her that he loved her and she was special, which Williams told police made her think that she was his girlfriend for a "long long time".

Williams claimed Ramzan began a sexual relationship with her when she was 12 or 13 years old, grooming her to have sex with other men. Williams alleged that Ramzan had "begged" her to have sex with a friend of his, telling her that she would be doing a "massive favour" for him. Williams told police she had sex with his friend and stated Ramzan had told her it would only happen once, but that was not the case and it happened more frequently. She explained she discovered that Ramzan would get money whenever she had sex with other men. She stated that Ramzan would take her to parties, where there were other girls and she met other men in Barrow, Rochdale and Oldham and other places. She wrote the names of 60 girls who she had been to addresses with. Many were verified by police as living in Barrow.

Williams alleged that in 2018, Ramzan had suggested she go to Amsterdam, where she had been forced to work in a brothel and was sold for €25,000 at an auction. However, the buyer had not completed the deal. She further alleged that Ramzan had taken her to Ibiza for two weeks, where she was forcibly coerced into working in a brothel. She stated that when she "messed up", she would be beaten. She said she was fearful of what would happen to her if it was to be found out she had spoken to the police.

Police were concerned that something like what Williams was describing was indeed occurring, in a scenario potentially similar to what had previously happened with grooming gangs in Oldham and Rochdale. Police were worried about getting things wrong or people getting hurt if they failed to act soon enough. Police arrested Ramzan and interviewed him. He denied the offence, denying that he knew Williams or had been to the places where she said he had been. After 36 hours in police custody, Ramzan was released on bail.

After this, a major investigations team was set up in regards to the Williams allegations. In the meantime, police temporarily moved Williams out of Barrow to a hotel close to Kendal police station, arranging for Williams to have a job there. Williams had previously refused to participate in a witness protection programme.

=== Sixth allegation ===
Williams made a further allegation that she had been trafficked to the Blackpool area around 30 June 2019. Williams stated she had been getting messages, stating that she was to get on the train to Blackpool. She described to police locations in Blackpool, with specific details of the layout of the addresses, including drawing pictures of places. Police believed that she had been to the locations from the way she could describe them in detail.

Police hoped that given how much detail Williams had provided about the addresses in Blackpool that the whole investigation would be opened up by one bit of evidence. Williams was taken by car by the police on 10 July 2019 to Blackpool in the hope that Williams could point out locations. This was captured on police body-worn video, showing Williams pointing out vague locations and actions that had happened, including getting into a car or walking. One of the officers that drove Williams to Blackpool was surprised that Williams could not provide details in relation to the addresses and hoped that driving around the Blackpool area they may go past somewhere that looked familiar to Williams. He later stated that he found it unusual that Williams displayed no emotion and at no point got upset. At the end of driving around Blackpool, police had no leads in their investigation. The officer driving Williams around later stated that this was the first time that he had doubts as to whether what Williams was saying had happened.

=== Police discover Williams has lied ===
Williams' discrepancies in Blackpool in relation to suspicions about whether what she was saying had happened had occurred were shared by other officers.

Due to Williams having previously been graded as a high-risk missing person, the police had authority to conduct checks on her mobile phone in relation to telephone masts that it was connecting to. This led to police trawling through accommodation in the Blackpool area to see whether Williams had been seen. Fifty venues were visited, including pubs, hotels and B&Bs. On the final venue, the Savoy Hotel, police were told by the receptionist that Williams had booked into the hotel on 30 June 2019.

Police uncovered that Williams had made a booking at the hotel two nights previously on Booking.com. They found that Williams arrived at the hotel at 20:20 BST, finding CCTV footage of her arriving on her own, checking in, before going to her room. After staying in the room for approximately an hour, Williams was seen on CCTV to leave the hotel and attend two local shops. This was contrary to what Williams had told police was happening around that time, stating that she had been driven around to various locations in Blackpool, being forced to have sex. Having left the local shops, Williams returned to the Savoy Hotel, where the door of the hotel room, which had digital key access, was shown to not have opened for 24 hours.

Police realised that Williams had been lying about what had occurred. An enquiry team went door to door to speak to the girls that Williams had alleged had been at the parties she had been at, who had been victims of sexual exploitation. Not one of them were found to have been a victim, with the girls and their parents being shocked at police speaking to them.

=== Seventh allegation ===
The police made the decision to arrest Williams for perverting the course of justice. However, before she could be arrested, Williams went missing again. Police located her 12 hours after she had been reported missing. When she was located in the early hours of 19 July 2019, she made further allegations against different men in relation to trafficking. Police body-worn video from their arrival at Williams' flat shows her opening the door, appearing intoxicated through either drink or drugs. Pretending to be semi-conscious, Williams is seen to have a number of injuries and says "help" to the police officer. An ambulance takes her to hospital, where she discloses that she had taken alcohol, cannabis and spice, telling an officer that she had sex with a male named "Oli" in Preston in a back street. She is heard to say to the officer "I'm not going to get arrested am I?", later stating, "You might not believe me."

Williams later stated in an interview with police that she got messages, telling her to get the train to Preston. She stated that she walked through the town centre of Preston and met a male called Oli – this was a male called Oliver Gardner. She stated that Gardner walked her through a back street to where there were two men, who paid Gardner to have sex with her. On returning to Barrow, Williams stated that a male named Salza picked her up in a car, dropping her off nearby to her address. After this, Williams stated that Salza and another man followed her into the address, whereby they had sex with her. She stated that she was hit in the face twice. She stated that approximately 10 minutes after this happened, police knocked at the door.

Police discovered CCTV of Williams. It showed Williams getting off a train in Preston. CCTV shows Gardner walking on his own, having a chance encounter with Williams when asking her for a light for his cigarette. They are seen to talk to one another, but when Gardner gets a light for his cigarette, he appears to walk off. Williams is seen on CCTV to follow him, appearing to want to continue the conversation. Later, Gardner and Williams are seen walking happily together, with Gardner having his arm around Williams. Voluntarily, the pair go up a lane out of view, where it is believed consensual sex occurs. The pair swap telephone numbers and Williams is seen on CCTV to walk back to the railway station.

At Preston railway station, Williams is seen on CCTV to enter the toilets. A camera at the basins in the toilets captures Williams appearing to be doing something to her eye, potentially adding makeup or something else to feign an injury.

CCTV further showed Williams returning to Barrow railway station. It was at this point that Williams had alleged that two males had collected her, before returning to her address. However, Williams was seen on CCTV to walk alone, with no-one nearby. By chance, her brother's girlfriend was driving and noticed Williams, stopping her car and driving her back to her flat. She did not see any injuries on Williams. Aware she was missing, her brother contacted the police to say Williams had returned. Police discovered that Williams significant facial and bodily injuries had happened within 20 minutes, from her brother informing police she was no longer missing, to police arriving at her flat. Finding that Williams had no relationship or family member who could have caused the injuries, police found that there was no other explanation than Williams having caused the injuries to herself.

Police discovered Oli at his place of work. Whilst it is usual practice for police to arrest a suspect of rape, they took a statement from him instead, to account for his movements, as the investigation at that point was on the basis that Williams had been lying.

=== Williams' arrest ===
Williams was arrested for perverting the course of justice and interviewed. In an interview, Williams was shown CCTV from the Savoy Hotel. Asked how she could account for the CCTV, Williams replied "I can't explain." Police explained to Williams that they had information that contradicted her version of events. Williams stated that she understood how serious the matters were, stating "I felt bad for lying" and that she was "really really sorry" for doing so. However, she added that people involved had discovered that she had been speaking to the police and in response, they had told her to tell the police certain information to prevent police from tracing them. She stated that it would be hard for the truth to be accepted when she had lied, but added "I don't get these bruises for no reason you know." She added, "I don't want to be that girl that cries rape", before repeating "I'm not that person." Asked how she got the bruises, she replied "Well how? You tell me." When police asked whether the injuries were self-inflicted, Williams responded "are you having a laugh?"

As soon as police discovered Williams had been lying, they began arranging for Trengove's release from prison. Having spent 73 days in prison, Trengove was released.

After Williams was arrested, a number of mobile phones in her possession were seized by police. Williams' phone was constantly going off throughout her initial interviews with police when she first made allegations. She would show all the messages to police, to evidence she was being trafficked.

Police found that Williams had used a second mobile phone to create conversations with a fake other victim. Both her first and second phone were found to be connecting to the same phone masts, even when Williams visited her father in Scotland. The second mobile phone had been given to her by a women's help group for victims of abuse.

Police discovered that Williams herself was effectively grooming men. This occurred through Williams meeting men on adult websites, encouraging contact that then became more explicit, before Williams would change the names in her phone, in one case changing a contact's name to "Rammi" and "Salza".

Williams conducted contact using Snapchat. As an American company, Snapchat were sometimes reluctant to assist police in the UK with enquiries. However, in late 2019, a policy change meant that Snapchat would provide information in cases of serious sexual offences.

=== Charges ===
Williams was charged with perverting the course of justice and given bail conditions, including to live under a strict curfew.

=== Eighth allegation ===
On 19 May 2020, police were called by Williams' mother, stating that she had gone missing, after not returning for her 19:00 curfew. A dog walker informed police that she had seen a woman in a field near to where Williams lived. Police body-worn video from officers at the scene show them locating Williams, injured within the field. Williams appeared to be looking behind her, as if there was someone there, with Williams stating that they had left before police had seen her. Williams told police that she was picked up in a car and taken to an address, whereby there were 10 men. She stated she was raped and injured inside the address. When officers found Williams, she had a significant eye injury, with a swollen eye that had closed up and laceration to her finger.

Officers searched the field where Williams was located and found a bloodstained hammer. DNA testing showed the only DNA present was Williams. A further eight hammers were seized from Williams' home address.

After being taken to hospital, a Home Office pathologist produced a report about Williams' injuries, stating that "the injuries identified to this young woman's body are consistent with this woman striking herself a multiplicity of times with a hammer, to the head, the face, both legs, arms and front of lower abdomen." Many of Williams' injuries appeared to have only been sustained in parts of her body that she could reach.

=== Williams arrested again ===
For her own safety, as well as finding that she had not been abducted, the decision was made to arrest Williams for breaching her court bail conditions that were set after being charged with perverting the course of justice. Officers arrested Williams in the early afternoon of 20 May 2020. Having been arrested, Williams was taken to Barrow police station. Williams was subsequently remanded on charges of perverting the course of justice.

=== Further charge of perverting the course of justice ===
Whilst in custody, Williams wrote a letter to her sister asking that she told her solicitors that a hammer was found in her bedroom, in an attempt to create a false defence for the final allegation Williams made. As a result, Williams was further charged with another count of perverting the course of justice.

== Facebook post ==
It was whilst she was at Barrow police station that police became aware Williams had put a post on Facebook. Including photos of her injuries, Williams stated that she was put in the back of a car the day before, being taken to an address to have sex with three Asian men. She stated that they were local men and that some were business owners. Williams stated that they had broken her ribs, many bones in her face and tried to drown and strangle her.

Williams' posts went viral, with one being shared more than 100,000 times. After the post went viral, over £22,000 was crowdfunded by Epping Forest Council local councillor Shane Yerrell for a private prosecution against the (fictitious) grooming gang. Williams' mother held onto the money during the trial, stating that it was for an appeal. Yerrell then started legal proceedings. Williams' mother donated the funds to The Salvation Army and Refuge, with multiple other charities refusing to take the money.

== Trial and sentencing ==
Williams' trial was held at Preston Crown Court in October 2022.

Prosecution barrister Jonathan Sandiford KC opened the prosecution's case by telling the jury that Williams was a "serial liar" and that her accounts were "a fabrication from first to last".

In relation to the allegation that 'C' had raped her, it was found there was no evidence to support Williams' allegation, including a Snapchat account that Williams had given them, not existing.

In relation to the allegation that Jordan Trengove had raped Williams, police had found that Williams had created fake Snapchat accounts, including 'jtrengy7', pretending to be Trengove. From this account, Williams wrote messages to herself, which appeared to incriminate Trengove, providing evidence of a false admission Trengove (who was really Williams) had made alongside Williams allegations that he had raped her. However, her IP address was linked to the messages having been sent via her home internet. Furthermore, Trengove could account for each of the nights that Williams alleged he had attacked her. On one occasion, he stated he had been in the back of a police van close to the time it was alleged he had assaulted Williams.

In relation to the allegation that Ramzan had taken Williams to Amsterdam to work in a brothel, it was shown that at the time Williams alleged, Ramzan's bank card was used in a Barrow B&Q store and that his phone had not left the Barrow area. Williams had been in Amsterdam at that time, however, and had shared a hotel with her sister and her boyfriend. It was heard that Williams admitted to police she had lied about the allegation that Ramzan had taken her to Ibiza for two weeks, forcing her to work in a brothel, when police said that travel records could be checked. Using the Snapchat account of a man with whom she had shared intimate messages, Williams had amended the contact information, making it appear as if the explicit images were from Ramzan.

The male Williams had previously named as 'Salza' was reported by Williams to have a full name of Emmanuel Salazar. However, alongside another 'trafficker' Williams named, called Role Kelzi, there was evidence that showed neither of them existed. A social media account on Instagram that Williams stated belonged to Salza, actually belonged to a man from Seattle, Washington.

In relation to the allegations of the involvement of other girls who Williams had named, it was discovered that she either knew the girls from school or had found their details online.

It was found that Williams had purchased a claw hammer used to inflict injuries upon herself from Tesco on 11 May. In relation to apparent self-inflicted injuries, Williams stated under cross-examination "I wouldn't buy a hammer to hurt myself, I'm not a psychopath."

The three-month trial heard other lies that Williams told were about her having a child, that she had worked at Ramzan's restaurant, that she had had a "backstreet abortion", had a heroin addiction from the abuse she had faced and had been in a coma.

It took the jury just a few hours to reach a unanimous decision, finding Williams guilty of all charges. She was sentenced to eight and a half years in prison by Judge Robert Altham, in March 2023.

Williams was originally scheduled to be released from custody in February 2025, at the halfway point of her sentence. This was calculated including the time she had spent on remand. In January 2025 she was released early on licence, after serving 1 year and 10 months. From her release, she is subject to a five-year serious crime prevention order.

== Impact of false accusations ==
=== Alleged 'suspects' ===
==== 'C' ====
The first, unnamed man (only known as 'C' at Williams trial) stated how frightening it was for him to be wrongly accused, arrested and kept in a police station. Wrongly accused of being a rapist, 'C' stated he did not go to Barrow town centre and had removed himself from social media. Fearing what people were saying, he could not pick his son up from nursery. He described Williams' false allegation against him as "the worst experience of his life", stating that he did not think he would ever recover.

==== Jordan Trengove ====
Trengove's house had the word "rapist" spray painted on it, with his mother having to leave the house. After being released from prison, he still had to face bail conditions, meaning he could not live at his home address. On returning to Barrow, Trengove faced strangers abusing him in the street and became isolated. In August 2020, he attempted to end his own life and was on anti-depressant medication, losing his self-confidence and unable to work. After the allegations, Trengove had a child, which resulted in a number of anonymous phone calls being made to social services, informing them he was a rapist and not safe to be with his child. Having recently moved addresses at the time of the trial, his new neighbour stated he did not want Trengove living there, calling him a rapist.

==== Mohammed Ramzan ====
Two weeks after being arrested, Ramzan was described as being in "such despair", that he attempted to end his life in front of his family, resulting in him sustaining an injury, leaving scars. Sections of the community in Barrow targeted him, smashing his vehicle's windows and damaging the tyres. He and his family had to move out of their home for some time, with effects on his family, including his children.

Ramzan stated that his businesses were "ruined", describing going from being successful to having "virtually nothing". The windows of one of his rental properties were smashed, repaired, and immediately smashed again. Ramzan received a number of death threats via social media and stated that even at the time of the trial, he still feared for his safety, having been unable to sleep and feeling anxious leaving the house over the past three years.

==== Man in Preston ====
The man that Williams met in Preston on the way back from Leeds was studying for exams and doing well at his place of work. As a result of the allegation, he had not worked since and had stopped studying. He had attempted to end his own life, suffering a serious mental health crisis.

=== Alleged 'victims' ===
A number of the people that Williams named as being victims of exploitation described their surprise of police approaching them about the allegations, including particular problems, as one of them was pregnant at the time police spoke to her, with another talking of the disruption of having to give evidence at court. Another stated how she felt her feelings had been "exploited" by Williams.

=== Barrow-in-Furness community ===
==== Cumbria Police ====
A police representative, Superintendent Pearlman of Cumbria Police, stated that after the Facebook post Williams made on 20 May, Barrow had not seen "such a public display of anger for 30 years". There was a sense of "heightened tension" for approximately 4 months, with a "state of unrest" lasting until August. The police were under pressure, both from those who felt unsafe from people taking the law into their own hands and from those who believed the police were covering up the incident. Demonstrations targeted the police, including racist anti-police graffiti on a wall in Barrow. A suspected police cover-up led to marches. On social media, threats were made against police, including that officers would be found and harmed. Attempts were made to locate home addresses of officers.

==== Local Asian community ====
Williams' claims heightened racial tensions across Britain; Cumbria Police reported dealing with over 150 extra crimes following her post, of which they considered 83 to be hate crimes. The senior investigating officer for the case said that he was "shocked" at the level of racism the accusations caused. As of March 2023, hate crime in the area had not yet decreased to the pre-2020 levels. The local Asian community were targeted, including an Indian restaurant's windows being smashed. Local businesses that were named in Williams' Facebook post feared being attacked, with death threats being received by restaurant owners and one restaurant's window being smashed. Activist Tommy Robinson turned up in Barrow-in-Furness, claiming to be a journalist investigating the case. In a court statement, Williams stated that she did not want Robinson to come to Barrow, and that she was "devastated" by the impact her post had on the community.

==== Local newspaper The Mail ====
Due to its reporting of the case, the local paper The Mail was subjected to boycotts. The paper later collapsed for financial reasons, though there was not enough evidence that this was a result of the boycotts.

Local journalists were subjected to "credible threats", causing one to leave her home and move from the area.

=== National ===
==== Real victims of sexual exploitation ====
A charity in Barrow that supports victims of sexual exploitation said many of its clients were reluctant to report abuse to police because they "don't want to be arrested". Other victims of abuse, including Sammy Woodhouse from the Rotherham child sexual exploitation scandal, claimed Williams' false allegations "caused harm" to survivors and will deter others from coming forward.

==== Online Safety Act 2023 ====
In 2023, Conservative MP Simon Fell raised the consequences of Williams' case to justice ministers in Parliament. He said that the virality of her claims and its social media spread prevented the police from adequately doing their job. The Parliamentary Under-Secretary of State for Courts and Legal Services, Mike Freer, responded that the government intended to create two new offences in the Online Safety Bill (passed as the Online Safety Act 2023 in October) to address the issue. This includes criminalising "communications where a person sends information that they know to be false with the intention of causing harm".

== Documentaries ==
The case was the subject of the BBC Three documentary Liar: The Fake Grooming Scandal, broadcast on 17 January 2024, which was broadcast again, on BBC Two, on 31 January.

In January 2025, Channel 4 broadcast a three-part documentary series about the case called Accused: The Fake Grooming Scandal. The series focussed heavily on Williams' viral Facebook post and its effect on the community and the ongoing police investigation. It includes interviews with Mohammed Ramzan, Nicola Ramzan, Jordan Trengove and Shane Yerrell.

On 25 March 2024, Sky News released a six-part podcast series under its StoryCast title called Unreliable Witness, featuring interviews with Ellie Williams' mother and sister.

The 2026 Sky documentary Groomed:The Truth Behind the Lie, details accounts from other women in Barrow, suggesting that there may have been more truth to the story than previously thought.

== Post-trial developments ==
It later emerged that a man and his two brothers mentioned by Williams during the trial had been subsequently convicted of multiple offences of child abuse, with two receiving life sentences. Williams had mentioned their names in court as being among those who had abused her, but they were not part of the group of five that she had been convicted of lying about. Another man named by Williams' mother in relation to the brothers, and whose name appears in Williams' diary, had also been convicted of sexual assault.

== See also ==
- Eleanor de Freitas – British woman who was charged with perverting the course of justice after allegedly making a false rape allegation
