= Dearne FM =

Coordinates: 53.55072°N 1.41275°W

Barnsley; England
- Broadcast area: Barnsley
- Frequency: FM: 97.1, 102.0 MHz

Programming
- Format: Classic Hits

Ownership
- Owner: Bauer

History
- First air date: October 5, 2003
- Last air date: August 31, 2020

Dearne FM was an Independent Local Radio station serving Barnsley. The station was folded into Greatest Hits Radio Yorkshire, as part of a rebrand, on 1 September 2020.

== History ==
The station was based at Zenith Park on Whaley Road, Barugh Green, in the north-west of Barnsley. As a result of cost cutting, Dearne FM co-located with sister stations Trax FM, Rother FM and Ridings FM at studios on White Rose Way in Doncaster. Five other companies competed for Barnsley's FM radio licence.

== Transmitters ==
The station was broadcast on 102.0 FM near Ardsley) in Barnsley and the Dearne Valley, and on 97.1 FM (near Hoylandswaine close to the A628 and A629 roundabout) for Penistone on Hunger Hill. The Ardsley transmitter also broadcast Hallam FM on 102.9 FM, with whom Dearne FM mainly competed. The 102 FM signal is more powerful than 97.1 FM, which is an off-air relay of 102 FM.

== Programming ==
Dearne FM appealed to a family audience playing a mix of current chart hits and the best songs from the 1960s, 1970s, 1980s, 1990s, 2000s and today combined with local news, information and competitions.
