= List of companies in Lincolnshire =

This is a list of notable companies that were founded in Lincolnshire, England or have a large presence in the county as a major employer. The official headquarters or registered office may be elsewhere.

The list is split into two main sections: current companies, and defunct companies that are no longer in business in their original form.

== Current companies ==
=== Headquartered in Lincolnshire ===
- Batemans Brewery - Brewer
- Bourne Publishing Group - Magazines
- Clugston Group - Construction and distribution (Liquidated)
- Delaine Bus Company
- Dynamic Cassette International
- Eminox - Stainless steel exhaust systems
- Extra (service areas) - Roadside service area operator
- F1Group - IT Services, IT Support and Business Improvement through Digital Transformation
- Falcon Cycles - Bicycle manufacturer
- Findus - Frozen food
- Interflora - UK arm of franchised florists selling flowers by post and retail stores
- Lincs FM Group - Local radio operator
- Linpac - Packaging founded in county
- Nisa - Food distribution and corner shop 'brand'
- Oldrids - Department store chain, including the Downtown brand
- ParkPilot AI - AI platform for the UK holiday park and leisure industry
- Peter Lind & Company - Builders
- Ross Group - Frozen foods company
- Splash About - toddler and children's swimwear brand
- Stagecoach in Lincolnshire - Local operating division for Stagecoach Group (took over several local bus companies including Lincolnshire RoadCar)
  - Stagecoach Grimsby-Cleethorpes
- TWB Electrical LTD - Electrical Contracting
- Unwins Engineering - Engineering and Fabrication
- Young's Bluecrest - Frozen food processors

=== Major presence in Lincolnshire ===
- British Steel - Formerly Tata and Corus Group plc
- Siemens - Formerly Rustons Gas Turbines

=== Founded in Lincolnshire ===
- The Cheese Shop, Louth - Artisan delicatessen

== Defunct companies (former) ==
- Allis-Chalmers - Tractors and construction machinery factory
- Appleby-Frodingham Steel Company - Absorbed into British Steel Corporation, now Corus
- Aveling-Barford - Former engineering company based in Grantham
- Aveling and Porter - Steam rollers (became Aveling-Barford)
- Autocast - Non-ferrous foundry in Bourne, supplying casings to the car industry
- Blackstone & Co - Blacksmiths and early engine manufacturer
- BMARC - Former armaments designer and manufacturer
- British Racing Motors (BRM) - Racing cars
- Chandlers Oil & Gas - now owned by WCF and known as WCF Chandlers
- Clayton & Shuttleworth - former steam and agricultural machinery builders
- English Racing Automobiles - Former race car builder
- Field Marshall - Brand of tractors built by Marshall, Sons & Co. Ltd of Gainsborough
- Marshall, Sons & Co. - Former steam engine and tractor manufacturer
- Priestman Brothers - Crane and excavator builders
- Rinovia Steam Fishing Company Ltd. - Former fish distribution company
- Richard Hornsby & Sons - Former engineering firm
- Ruston (engine builder) - Former stationary engine and locomotive manufacturer
- Ruston, Proctor and Company - Former steam engine builder
- Ruston-Bucyrus - Former manufacturer of excavators and steam shovels
- William Foster & Co. - Former agricultural engineer and steam engine builder
- Think Accounting Ltd. - Former payroll and accounts firm for Hgv drivers and oil rig workers.

== See also ==
- Top Track 100
- Top Track 250
