= 107.3 Abbey FM =

- Barrow-in-Furness; England
- Broadcast area: Furness Peninsula
- Frequency: 107.3 MHz

Ownership
- Owner: The Radio Business Ltd, CN Group Ltd, The Local Radio Company Ltd

History
- First air date: 16 October 2006
- Last air date: 30 January 2009

Abbey FM was an Independent Local Radio station for Barrow-in-Furness and the Furness Peninsula. The station ceased transmission at 3 p.m. on 30 January 2009 and was placed into administration with the loss of seven jobs. This followed one of the station's main backers, The Local Radio Company, withdrawing their support three weeks earlier. The Station Manager at the time, Amanda Bell, told the North West Evening Mail that this "forced the hand of the other shareholders" and that she was only informed of their decision on the day of the closure at 12:30 p.m.

Abbey FM was owned by The Radio Business Ltd (35%), CN Group Ltd (30%) and The Local Radio Company Ltd (35%). The licence was for a locally focused, full-service, music and information lifestyle station for 25- to 64-year-olds service to serve the town of Barrow-in-Furness and the immediately surrounding area, which has an adult population (aged 15+) of around 65,000.

The licence was issued for a twelve-year period.

As of 3p.m. on Friday 30 January 2009, Abbey FM stopped broadcasting, shortly after the announcement that the station had been placed into administration by its joint owners CN Group, TLRC and The Radio Business.
