= Lincs FM Group =

British radio broadcasting company

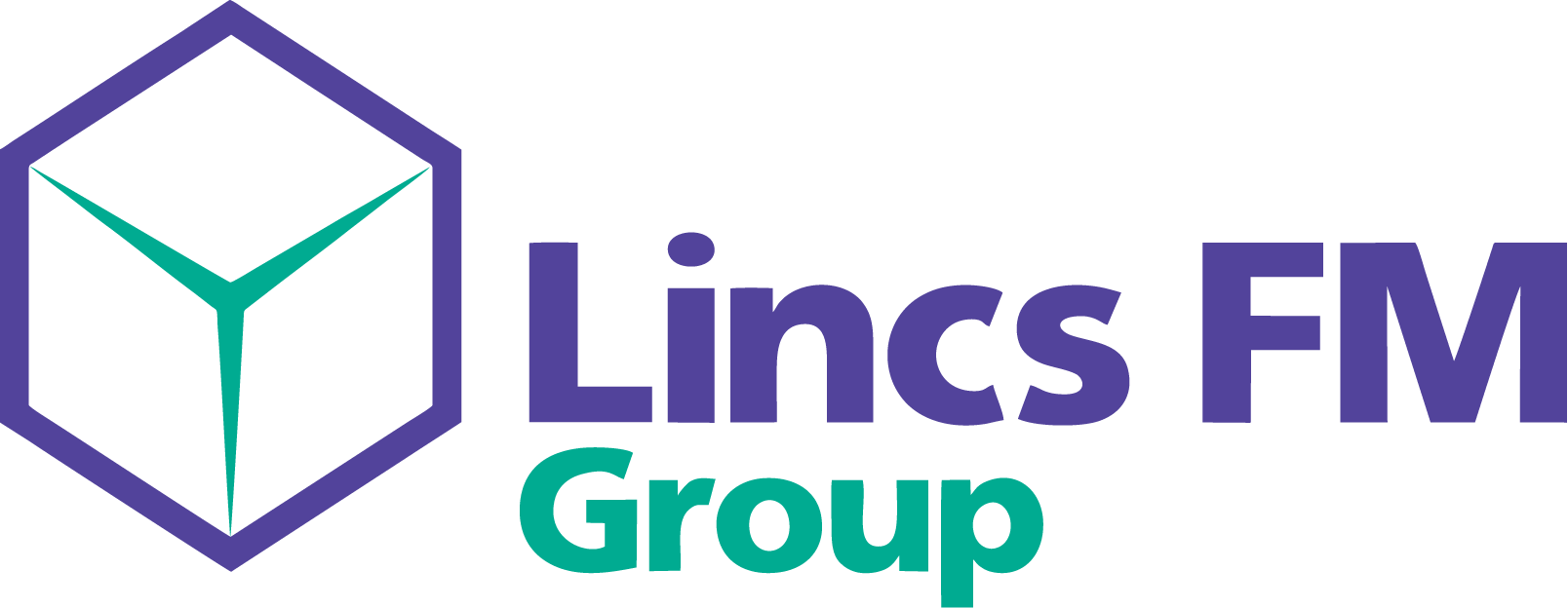
- Industry: Commercial radio
- Founded: March 1991
- Defunct: February 2019
- Fate: Acquired by Bauer Radio
- Headquarters: Witham Park, Waterside South, Lincoln, LN5 7JN
- Area served: England
- Products: 7 Independent Local Radio stations
- Total assets: MuxCo Lincolnshire
- Parent: Bauer Radio
- Website: Lincs FM Group

The Lincs FM Group was the parent company of several Independent Local Radio (ILR) stations. As of Q2 2019 the group had a combined audience of 524,000. It was based in Lincolnshire, in the UK.

== History ==
The Lincs FM Group was formed in the early 1990s with the winning of the ILR licence for Lincolnshire. Lincs FM started broadcasting in 1992 and subsequently the Lincs FM Group won and acquired licences to operate other local radio stations across England's Midlands and Yorkshire regions.

The Lincs FM Group also had a 33% share in Ipswich 102 and a 51% share in the digital radio multiplexes operating DAB services in Lincolnshire and Suffolk.

Lincs FM Group was purchased by Bauer Radio in February 2019; Bauer also purchased the stations of Celador Radio at the same time. KCFM was sold to Nation Broadcasting due to overlapping with existing Bauer asset Viking FM; the other Lincs stations remained with Bauer. Due to further potential competition issues with Bauer's existing stations and their new purchases the group began operating in 'hold separate' pending investigation of the sale by the Competition and Markets Authority. Eventually, Bauer was allowed to proceed with its business plans.

After acquisition, most of the group's remaining stations were rebranded as Greatest Hits Radio with Suffolk First closing, and Lincs FM retained as a standalone station.

== Radio stations ==
- Lincs FM (Lincolnshire & Newark)
- Compass FM (North East Lincolnshire)
- Trax FM (Doncaster & Bassetlaw)
- Dearne FM (Barnsley, Penistone and the Dearne Valley)
- Rutland Radio (Stamford & Rutland)
- Ridings FM (the Wakefield district)
- Rother FM (Rotherham)
- Suffolk First (Suffolk)

== Branding ==
Each station's logo was green and purple as these were the company colours; these logos featured heavily in each stations merchandise.

The group ran three music formats across its stations. "Hits & Memories" stations were the staple of the group, playing a wide variety of popular music from the 1960s to the present day. "Music You Love" stations leant older, with a greater percentage of songs released pre-1990 played. "Country music and more" was the format of the digital-only station Suffolk First, which played a mixture of country music and pop music.

Hits & Memories Brand
- Lincs FM for Lincolnshire and Newark
- Dearne FM for Barnsley, Penistone and the Dearne Valley
- Rother FM for Rotherham and the surrounding area
- Trax FM for Doncaster, Bassetlaw and Worksop (2 licences)
The Music You Love Brand
- Compass FM for Grimsby, Cleethorpes and Immingham
- Ridings FM for the Wakefield district
- Rutland Radio for Rutland and Stamford

== Acquisitions ==
Until October 2007, the group was unique in the United Kingdom in that it had grown organically through licence awards, rather than by acquisition of existing stations. As FM licences ceased advertising in the late 2000s, the group, with a desire to continue growing, made their first acquisition with Oak 107 FM in October 2007 (previously owned by the CN Group). This station was sold on a few years later to rejoin its former network. This was followed by the acquisition of KCFM in June 2009, previously owned by Planet Broadcasting.

== Disposals ==
- Oak FM, comprising the Hinckley and Loughborough licences, was sold to Quidem in 2012. It was rebranded as Fosse 107 following the insolvency of the station
- KCFM was sold to Nation Broadcasting in February 2019

== Licence bid failure ==
In 2006, the group made a bid to win the Hull licence along with six other groups. The format for the Lincs bid was the same of that of Compass FM; this is thought to be because Lincs FM already overlaps the North East Lincolnshire area. The station went under the working title of "White Rose Radio" to reflect the white rose of Yorkshire. The group did not win the licence and lost out to Kingston upon Hull-based KCFM. However, KCFM became part of the Lincs FM Group in June 2009.

== See also ==
- List of companies in Lincolnshire
