= The Mail (Cumbria) =

Daily local newspaper in the United Kingdom

- Type: Daily newspaper
- Format: Tabloid
- Owner: USA Today Co.
- Publisher: Newsquest
- Editor: Vanessa Sims
- Founded: 1898 as the North-Western Daily Mail
- Language: English
- Headquarters: Kendal
- Circulation: 2,004 (as of 2024)
- Website: nwemail.co.uk

The Mail, known previously as the North-West Evening Mail (1987–2017), is a daily, local newspaper in the United Kingdom, printed every morning. It is based in Kendal.

The Mail was founded as the North-Western Daily Mail in 1898, becoming the North-Western Evening Mail in 1941 and the North-West Evening Mail in 1987. Although its title suggests a larger area, it in fact only covers news in the South Lakes and Furness. Typically, this is Barrow, Dalton-in-Furness, Ulverston, Grange-Over-Sands, Windermere, Millom, and some of the more notable stories from Kendal and Copeland.

It is in a tabloid style, and has three separate editions (Barrow, Ulverston and Millom), though the only difference is the story on the front page. Before changes to printing arrangements it had four - Barrow Early, Barrow Late Final, Ulverston and South Lakes, and Millom: although the only difference was on the front page and page six; the remainder of the paper was the same throughout. Articles typically range between important local news items (such as major council decisions, local business news, etc.), to more personal stories about residents of the area.

The Mail is printed and published by Furness Newspapers Ltd., a subsidiary of Carlisle-based media company CN Group Ltd. The current circulation is around 7,500 copies a day (down from 14,500), within South Cumbria (a region with a total population of almost 250,000). Market penetration is at its highest in its core area of Barrow and Dalton, at almost 10 per cent of households and at its lowest in Ambleside.

James Higgins, formerly assistant editor of The Bolton News, edited the paper from July 2014 to March 2018 and having spent the previous four years as deputy editor. During his tenure, the newspaper won the coveted Newspaper of the Year award (2017) at the Society of Editors' UK press Awards, O2 North West Media Awards Scoop of the Year (2017) for an exposé on animal deaths at the South Lakes Safari Zoo, and Front Page of the Year (2015) for what became an iconic edition of the newspaper. He left the role in 2018 following Newsquest's acquisition of the CN Group. He was preceded by Jonathan Lee, who joined in 2008. Lee was previously editor of the Shetland Times, but left after a vote of no confidence from colleagues. Previous editors of The Mail include Steve Brauner, Sara Hadwin, Donald Martin, Keith Sutton, Tom Welsh and Joe Gorman.

The newspaper became a subject of a boycott because of its reporting about the Eleanor Williams case and is said to suffer financial collapse.

Former Lancashire Telegraph news editor Vanessa Sims is currently the editor of the paper.
