= New 107 Oak FM =

Former Independent Local Radio station in West Leicestershire, England

The New 107 Oak FM
- England
- Broadcast area: West Leicestershire & North Warwickshire
- Frequencies: 107.0 MHz (Loughborough); 107.9 MHz (Hinckley & Nuneaton)

Programming
- Format: Adult hits

Ownership
- Owner: ATR Media
- Sister stations: The New 96.2 Touch FM

History
- First air date: 26 March 2008
- Last air date: 28 July 2016

Links
- Website: http://107.oakfm.co.uk/ http://1079.oakfm.co.uk/

The New 107 Oak FM was an Independent Local Radio station broadcasting in West Leicestershire and Nuneaton North Warwickshire, in the English Midlands. It was owned and operated by ATR Media.

== History ==
Launching on Wednesday 26 March 2008, the station was established by the merger of two existing stations which originally launched in the late 1990s: existing Lincs FM Group station Fosseway Radio in Hinckley and the acquisition of Oak 107 FM in Loughborough from the CN Group in October 2007.

=== Fosseway Radio ===
Fosseway Radio was the original holder of the Hinckley licence, awarded to the Lincs FM Group by the Radio Authority in early 1998. It launched on the air on 1 November that year.

=== Oak FM ===
The original Oak FM launched on 14 February 1999. The station went through a number of rebrands and was eventually acquired by the CN Group in the early 2000s. In 2003 the station supported the "Give The Luffs a Lease" campaign in favour of Loughborough Football Club's attempt to secure a long term lease for the site of its stadium. This licence became Lincs FM's first-ever acquisition, in the Autumn of 2007.

== Ownership history ==
=== Lincs FM (2008–2012) ===
According to a memorandum to Ofcom, both stations had never returned a profit in their first decade on-air. To allow the station to become profitable, both studios were moved to a new site near Coalville generally equidistant between the two towns. Following a temporary co-location at the Hinckley studios, the new studios opened in the Summer of 2008. There were originally separate breakfast shows, with localised specialist programmes on Sunday evening. Outside of this schedule, the two services were identical but retained split advertising, allowing clients the opportunity to buy one, the other, or both transmitters if they wished.

As networking was introduced in 2008 some presenters left, with others introduced from elsewhere in the group. The breakfast shows merged in 2010. The merge resulted in an increase in pre-recorded programming and redundancies. The weekend specialist shows became pre-recorded in late 2011, including the country show which had run on the Hinckley transmitter since 1998.

=== Quidem ===
Cuts in 2012-2013 did not produce sufficient savings and the station was purchased by Quidem in 2012, becoming the Lincs FM Group's first disposal. The station added Quidem's Hot AC mix with off-peak programmes being networked from the Group HQ in Kenilworth, Warwickshire. Following this most Lincs FM Group presenters left the station, and new presenters were introduced. The drivetime show became voicetracked.

The station was sold by Quidem to ATR Media in August 2015

== Format change and re-brand ==
On 21 March 2014 a loop of the Queen hit "Bohemian Rhapsody" was played consistently until 10am the following Monday morning, the station having relaunched with a male-orientated rock format. There is no longer any networking taken.

== Closure ==
On Thursday 28 July 2016, service was running as normal, with drive time presenter Craig Strong doing his show as usual. After playing Coolio's C U When U Get There, at 5.55pm that afternoon, he informed listeners that the aforementioned track was the last one that he would play on Oak FM, and also announced that within minutes, the station 'would be no more'. The station abruptly closed down at 6 pm that day, just as the latest Sky News Radio bulletin was getting underway.

No reason for the closure was given at the time, but it was later revealed that two directors took insolvency advice.
