= Paul Walters =

British radio and television producer (1947–2006)

- Born: Paul Christopher Walters; 15 June 1947; Wheathampstead, Hertfordshire, England
- Died: 21 October 2006 (aged 59); Berkhamsted, Hertfordshire, England
- Other names: Pauly Walters, Dr Wally, Dr Wally Poultry, Dr Wallington P. De Wynter Courtney Claibourne Magillicuddy Walters
- Occupations: BBC Radio and TV producer

Paul Christopher Walters (15 June 1947 – 21 October 2006) was a British radio and TV producer, best known for his work and appearances on Terry Wogan's BBC Radio 2 breakfast show Wake Up to Wogan from 1995 until a few months before his death in 2006, where he was known to millions as "Dr Wally Poultry". He was also referred to by the name "Pauly Walters."

Walters was born in Wheathampstead, Hertfordshire, where he grew up. In 1973 he joined the BBC as a trainee Film Assistant after having worked for some time at ATV and Rank Radio International. In 1977 Walters became an acting producer at BBC Radio 2, initially for only three months before returning to television. However, he soon returned full-time to radio for The Radio 2 Early Show.

Walters worked on a range of programmes for Radio 2, including You The Night & The Music, Nightride, John Dunn, Ed Stewart, David Jacobs and the Eurovision Song Contest. He also worked with many of the station's most famous presenters such as Ken Bruce, Sarah Kennedy, David Hamilton, Adrian Love and Chris Stuart.

In 1995, Walters became the producer of Wake Up to Wogan and, together with Terry Wogan, made it one of the most popular radio programmes in the UK. He had previously produced Wogan's breakfast show in the early 1980s. Walters became famous and a household name by taking part in Wogan's infamous banter, acquiring the nickname "Dr Wally" (or, in full, Dr Wallington P. De Wynter Courtney Claibourne Magillicuddy Walters). In 1996 Walters pioneered the use of emails and the webcam in the programme.

In 1998, Walters and Wogan launched Wogan's Web, a short-lived lunchtime show broadcast on BBC One in May and June that year. The format was made up, like WUTW, of banter and viewer contributions via letters, emails and faxes, plus some topical items and guests, such as fellow Radio 2 presenter, friend and regular "Pause for Thought" contributor Canon Roger Royle. Walters appeared in vision and the programme also featured voiceovers from WUTW's regular newsreader, Alan Dedicoat.

Along with Wogan, Walters is widely credited with introducing the music of Beth Nielsen Chapman, Eva Cassidy and Katie Melua to the British public, as he selected much of their music to be played during Wogan's show.

On 21 October 2006, the BBC announced that he had died in a hospice in Berkhamsted, aged 59, following a long illness that had been diagnosed the previous November. He had made his final on air appearance on WUTW in January that year. Two days after his death, that morning's edition of WUTW was dedicated to Walters, playing a selection of his favourite music. He did continue to choose the music for the programme during his illness and was replaced on production duties by Alan Boyd, who filled in during his absence, and who remained until Wogan left the breakfast slot at the end of 2009.
