= Release on licence =

Release on licence in England and Wales can refer to

- Release from prison on temporary licence, followed by return to prison.
- Release from prison on parole, subject to recall to prison if conditions of parole are violated.
- Release from prison on standard licence, which lasts for the remainder of the offender's sentence unless the conditions of the licence are breached. If the conditions are breached, the offender may be recalled to custody. This differs from parole in that the release process occurs automatically at a set point during the sentence, whereas parole must be approved by the parole board.
