= Trax FM =

Former radio station in England

Coordinates: 53.511°N 1.131°W

Doncaster; England
- Broadcast area: South Yorkshire and north Nottinghamshire
- Frequencies: FM: 107.1 MHz (Doncaster); 107.9 MHz (Bassetlaw); DAB: 11C
- RDS: TRAX_FM_

Programming
- Format: Adult Contemporary

Ownership
- Owner: Bauer

History
- First air date: November 22, 1998
- Last air date: September 1, 2020

Trax FM was an Independent Local Radio station serving Doncaster in South Yorkshire and the Bassetlaw district of north Nottinghamshire. The station was folded into Greatest Hits Radio Yorkshire, as part of a rebrand, on 1 September 2020.

== History ==
The station started as two separate licences, one for Doncaster and one for Bassetlaw. Previously the station had operated two "RSL" 28-day broadcasts.

In 2020, Trax FM, along with the other Lincs FM Group stations, were sold to Bauer Media and the station was rebranded as Greatest Hits Radio in September 2020, as part of their national Greatest Hits Radio network. It now broadcasts national and regional music programmes with local news bulletins.

== Transmitters ==
The service for Doncaster broadcasts on 107.1FM previously from the studios on White Rose Way in Doncaster. The signal is broadcast from the Clifton transmitter, near Conisbrough, South Yorkshire. That signal is five times more powerful than the former Worksop transmitter. In 2015, transmissions moved to an antenna on Silverwood House in the centre of Doncaster.

The service for Bassetlaw is on 107.9FM used to come from the studios on Bridge Street in Worksop. The signal was transmitted from the Worksop transmitter, north of Worksop in Bassetlaw next to the B6045 towards Blyth, north Nottinghamshire. In 2016, transmissions moved to a transmitter at Worksop Golf Course to the south of the town. The transmitter provides coverage to Worksop town and rural areas to the west of Retford.

Trax FM was also broadcast across South Yorkshire and the North Midlands on DAB Digital Radio on the Bauer South Yorkshire (former EMAP South Yorkshire) multiplex and on the Internet. Trax FM on DAB and the Internet carried the Doncaster variation of the station.

== Background ==
Trax FM co-located the Bassetlaw service to Doncaster in 2007, despite the original 107.9 station ownership being crucial in getting the more lucrative Doncaster licence. The format change includes a reduction in the hours of local broadcasting from seven hours to four hours.

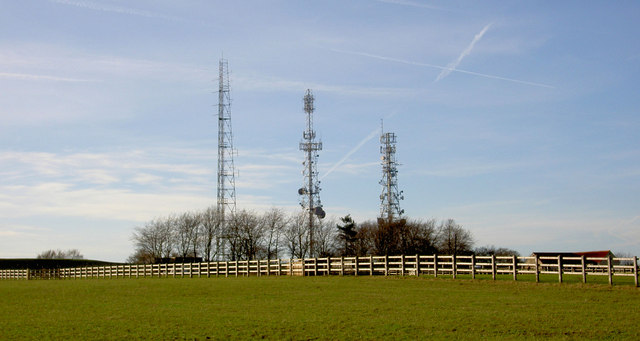
Clifton transmitter on Beacon Hill, north of the M18, former transmitter of Trax FM on FM and current transmitter of Trax FM on DAB via the Sheffield multiplex.
