= Rother FM =

Radio station in Rotherham, South Yorkshire, England

Rotherham; England
- Frequency: FM: 96.1 MHz
- RDS: ROTHERFM

Programming
- Format: Contemporary

Ownership
- Owner: Bauer

History
- First air date: 15 October 2006
- Last air date: 31 August 2020

Technical information
- Transmitter coordinates: 53.4169°N 1.3513°W

Rother FM was an Independent Local Radio station serving the English town of Rotherham. The station was on air from 2006 until it was closed in 2020 by owners Bauer so that the frequency could be used to broadcast Greatest Hits Radio Yorkshire.

== Studios and coverage ==
Rother FM was originally based in Rotherham from its studios at Aspen Court in Templeborough, but later moved to Doncaster as part of cost saving measures. It covered the Rotherham Borough from its transmitter at Boston Castle, although it could easily be heard in neighbouring areas such as Sheffield and Barnsley.

== Background ==
Prior to being awarded the licence by Ofcom, Rother FM broadcast two Restricted Service Licence broadcasts from the Carlton Park Hotel. The station went on to be awarded the full-time licence and launched at 10 am on Sunday 15 October 2006 with presenter James Marriott hosting the first show.

It was part of the Lincs FM Group of radio stations and broadcast on the old Hallam FM frequency of 96.1 MHz FM. The station broadcast a mix of current chart music as well as well known tracks from the 1960s, 1970s, 1980s, 1990s and 2000s alongside news, information and competitions.

== Closure ==
Lincs FM Group was purchased by Bauer Radio in February 2019 and eighteen months later, most of the group's remaining stations including Rother FM, were rebranded as Greatest Hits Radio.
