= Touch FM (Warwick) =

107.3 Touch FM
- Kenilworth; England
- Broadcast area: Warwick, Leamington Spa and Kenilworth
- Frequency: 107.3 MHz

Programming
- Format: AC
- Network: Touch FM

Ownership
- Owner: Quidem Ltd

History
- First air date: 4 April 2008; 18 years ago
- Last air date: 29 November 2019; 6 years ago

Links
- Website: 107.3 Touch FM

107.3 Touch FM was an Independent Local Radio station broadcasting to the Warwick, Leamington Spa and Kenilworth areas of Warwickshire.

== History ==
OFCOM awarded the Warwick licence to the CN Group in January 2006 for their 2-Day FM application. However, it took the group over two years to commence broadcasting, which they eventually did on Friday 4 April at 7 pm under the name of 107.3 Touch Radio. The initial presenter line-up was Ben Day, who left The Severn to take up his new position on Breakfast, Louisa Allen on mid-mornings, Mikey Faulkner on drive and Matt Walters on the evening show.

The CN Group later sold its Midland based Touch Radio Network to Quidem. The station was then re-branded to 107.3 Touch FM.

In September 2019, Quidem announced it had entered a brand licensing agreement with Global, citing financial losses. Two months later, following permission from regulator, Ofcom to change the station's format, it was confirmed Touch FM (Warwick) would merge with its Quidem-owned sister stations and launch as Capital Mid-Counties on 2 December 2019.

Local output for the Mid-Counties region consists of a three-hour regional Drivetime show on weekdays, alongside localised news bulletins, traffic updates and advertising for Warwick, Leamington Spa and Kenilworth. Touch FM ceased broadcasting at 7pm on Friday 29 November 2019.
