= Go4It =

British children's radio programme (2001–2009)

Go4It was a British children's magazine programme broadcast on Sunday evenings at 7.15pm on BBC Radio 4, and one of the few speech-based shows on British national radio aimed at younger listeners. It was broadcast between 2001 and 2009.

== History ==
Children's radio had been provided by Listen with Mother from 1950 to 1982 and subsequently by a weekday lunchtime programme called Listening Corner. From 1990, there were Children's BBC radio serials on BBC Radio 5. When that station closed in 1994 CBBC serials moved to Radio 4 on Sundays from 7 to 7.30pm until Easter 1998 when it was replaced by another episode of The Archers.

"Go4It" started in 2001 and was originally produced by Jo Daykin and hosted by Matt Smith and included Cromarty the space cat and many jokes. Smith was replaced one year later by CBBC presenter Barney Harwood on 5 May 2002. With Harwood's arrival the show became less patronising with the theme tune changed to Danger Man. When Harwood was off on holiday there were guest presenters like Kirsten O'Brien, Natalie Barrass and David McFetridge.

The show typically centred on themes of books, poetry and literature. A typical episode featured a guest author or poet and often a trip 'on location' to an event related to children's literature. It could be considered a junior version of Radio 4's Book Club with an author being asked questions by the young fans in the studio: the 'g4it-ers'. Also included were games and competitions. Some shows were also themed, for instance an Arthurian theme (27 May 2007) or Enid Blyton (3 June 2007). The programme included readings of serialized stories although this was later dropped as the show 'matured'; instead listeners were encouraged to listen to sister programme Big Toe Books on BBC7.

The 4 May 2008 episode was a special on comics. Featured was Philip Pullman's new comic strip and Eagle.

During the first year the show was extensively parodied on the Radio 4 impressionist satire Dead Ringers for being about 'what people at Radio 4 think young people want to listen to', for instance Dylan Thomas poetry read by Richard Burton and Will Self stories. Matt Smith was singled out for what could be seen as a patronising attitude towards the audience, including excessive use of the word 'ace'.

== Cancellation ==
In March 2009, it was announced that Go4It would be cancelled. The last episode was broadcast on 24 May 2009. The reason given was that it did not attract enough young listeners. The show attracted an average of 450,000 listeners, but only 20,000 were aged between 4–14. The average age of the listeners was between 52 and 55. The decision to axe Go4It means that there are now no children's programmes on BBC analogue radio.

== Guests on the programme ==
Studio guests and people Natalie Barrass interviewed:

- Philip Pullman and Dakota Blue Richards interviewed on her debut in the recently released film The Golden Compass (based on Pullman's "His Dark Materials") as the lead character Lyra Belacqua.
- Michael Morpurgo - Former Children's Laureate
- Terry Deary - Author of Horrible Histories series, was interviewed on his trilogy, The Fire Thief and Greek Mythology
- Morris Gleitzman - Author of Doubting Thomas
- Rainer Hersch - Musician
- Lynne Reid Banks - Author of 1980s series The Indian in the Cupboard
- Paul Jennings - An Australian author
- Michael Rosen - Author of the Sad Book, written to cope his grief of losing his son Eddie at 18.
- Jacqueline Wilson -Author of children's books, most famously The Story of Tracy Beaker
- Raymond Briggs - Cartoonist behind The Snowman
- Steve Jackson - A British game designer
- Daniel Radcliffe - Played Harry Potter in the famous films, and spoke about his favourite books
- Nick Tocjek. - Poet, who wrote a new poem with the help of the Go4it guests. (20 May 2007)
- Kevin Crossley-Holland, - Author of a series on the Arthurian legend.
- Philip Reeve - Author of books about King Arthur, and the Mortal Engines Series.(27 May 2007)
- Imogen Smallwood - Enid Blyton's daughter. (3 June 2007)
- Eva Rice - Author of Who's Who in Enid Blyton.
- Jam - a member of the all-girl computer experts, the Frag Dolls.
- Dan Freedman - Author of "The Kickoff", about a boy who works hard to become a top footballer, but also includes some tips for budding footballers. (17 June 2007)
- Nick Green - Author of The Cat Kin.
- Andrew Cope Author of Spy Dog. (24 June 2007)
- Catherine Lamb, - Author of Penguin Problems, on how they can help the environment.
- David Gilman, Author of "The Devil's Breath", in which the hero, Max Gordon, fights to protect the environment in some of the most dangerous places on earth.(3 June 2007)
- Anthony Horowitz - Author of "Alex Rider" and "The Power of Five" Series.
- Philip Ardagh - Author of the "Eddie Dickens" Trilogy(8 July 2007)
- Louise Rennison - Author of teenage fiction.
- Shirley Hughes - Author and Illustrator behind the hugely popular Dogger
- Minne Gray - Author of The Adventures of The Dish and The Spoon, which picks up where the nursery rhyme "Hey Diddle Diddle" left off. (22 July 2007)
- Thomas Daley - Diver and Teen Olympian

== See also ==
- Children's Hour
- The Big Toe Radio Show
