= 107.1 Rugby FM =

Independent local radio station in Warwickshire

Rugby, Warwickshire; England
- Frequency: 107.1 MHz

Programming
- Format: AC

Ownership
- Owner: Quidem

History
- First air date: 31 August 2002
- Last air date: 29 November 2019

Technical information
- Transmitter coordinates: 52.3750°N 1.2685°W

Links
- Website: www.rugbyfm.co.uk

107.1 Rugby FM was an Independent Local Radio station in Warwickshire. At the time of closure, it was owned and operated by Quidem and broadcast from studios at Honiley, Warwickshire.

== History ==
Under the directorship of Martin Mumford, 107.1 Rugby FM launched on 31 August 2002—former Silk FM controller Trevor Thomas was the first voice on-air, also working as the station's programme manager, before leaving to join Warwickshire neighbour The Bear 102.

The station, then owned by the Milestone Group, enjoyed considerable success, and was lauded at one point as the UK's most successful local commercial radio station in terms of audience reach - once at 44% (RAJAR Q2 2005) - attributed to an emphasis on local presence, and presenters who were recruited on the basis of quality. They also enjoyed a substantially different music policy to that of its competitors. Following Mumford's departure in 2005, Julian Hotchkiss became Managing Director of Rugby FM but left a year later following the CN Group's acquisition of the station in early 2006. The group had been a minority shareholder until this point.

From 2002 until 2008, the station was based at studios on Spring Street in the heart of the town centre. The CN Group acquisition had a number of far-reaching consequences on the output, notably the loss of 20 hours a day of local programming, and the studios being moved out of Rugby town centre into a regional hub in Kenilworth.

Between 2007 and 2009, the CN Group divested of its Midlands radio stations. First to be sold was Oak 107 FM, which went to the Lincs FM Group, who merged it with their licence in nearby Hinckley. Touch FM Banbury was sold a year later to a private consortium, and was subsequently rebranded as Banbury Sound. The remaining Touch stations, with Rugby FM, were sold to Quidem Ltd in Summer 2009, with Banbury Sound picked back up in October 2010 and Oak FM picked up in 2012.

In September 2019, Quidem announced it had entered a brand licensing agreement with Global, citing financial losses. Two months later, following permission from Ofcom to change the station's format, it was confirmed Rugby FM would merge with its sister Quidem-owned stations and launch as Capital Mid-Counties on 2 December 2019. Rugby FM ceased broadcasting at 7pm on Friday 29 November 2019.
