= A Kist o Wurds =

A Kist o Wurds is a BBC Northern Ireland Ulster-Scots radio programme that has been running since 2002. The show is produced by Chris Spurr, for Blackthorn Productions. Each week it contains a selection of music, poetry and news from across the country and is a source of information on the Ulster-Scots language, culture, literary traditions and history. The show is broadcast on BBC Radio Ulster on Sundays at 4pm and repeated on Wednesdays at 7.30pm on Radio Ulster and Radio Foyle.

== Presenters ==
The radio programme is often presented by Anne Morrison-Smyth and Helen Mark; other presenters include: Charlie Gillen, Conal Gillespie, Jackie Morrison, Laura Spence, Tracey Gillen, Will McAvoy, Willie Cromie, Charlie Reynolds, Alister McReynolds, Willie Drennan, Wilson Burgess and Andy Mattison.
