= Wake Up to Wogan =

Former British radio programme (1993–2009)

- Genre: Music, Chat
- Running time: 150 mins (1993); 120 mins (1994–2009)
- Country of origin: United Kingdom
- Language: English
- Home station: BBC Radio 2
- Hosted by: Terry Wogan
- Starring: Alan Dedicoat; John Marsh; Fran Godfrey (1993–2008); Charles Nove (2007–09); Lynn Bowles (2007–09); Paul Walters (1995–2006); Alan Boyd (2006–09)
- Produced by: Alan Boyd (2006–09); Paul Walters (1995–2006); Geoff Mullin (1993–9?)
- Recording studio: Broadcasting House, London (1993–2006); Western House, London (2006–09)
- Original release: 4 January 1993 – 18 December 2009
- Audio format: FM, online and digital radio
- Website: bbc.co.uk/radio2/shows/wogan/
- Podcast: Official podcast (archived)

Wake Up to Wogan (WUTW) is the incarnation of The Radio 2 Breakfast Show that aired each weekday morning from 4 January 1993 to 18 December 2009. It was the most-listened-to radio show in the United Kingdom, and the flagship breakfast programme broadcast on BBC Radio 2. The show was presented by Terry Wogan, who had previously presented the breakfast show between 1972 and 1984, but the title Wake Up to Wogan was only added at the start of his second tenure in 1993. Wogan replaced Brian Hayes, who had hosted the breakfast show during 1992.

On 7 September 2009, Wogan confirmed to his listeners that he would be leaving the show at the end of the year, with Chris Evans taking over the breakfast show from 11 January 2010. The final show was broadcast on 18 December 2009. Regular stand-in presenter Johnnie Walker became interim host of the breakfast show for the three-week period between Wogan's departure and Evans' arrival.

== The show ==
Wogan originally took over the airwaves from Sarah Kennedy after the news at 7am, but from 17 January 1994 until the end of the show's run, this was changed to 7:30am (following the news headlines). He always finished with a hand-over to Ken Bruce at 9:30am. WUTW was a music-based programme that included listeners' views and comments which were often light-hearted and whimsical. Traffic bulletins interrupted the programme at half-hour intervals and had until February 2007 been presented by that morning's newsreader. Similar to other programmes during the day the traffic bulletins are now delivered by a travel announcer.

The 1993-2009 incarnation of the programme had far more of an "ensemble" feel to it than Wogan's first spell on breakfast. During the first spell, Wogan primarily read out letters from listeners, read the travel bulletins himself, made humorous observations about TV programmes and newspaper articles and featured segments such as "Fight the Flab" and the daily racing tip "Wogan's Winner". There was a formal divide between the newsreader and Wogan, and interaction between them was rare. When the show returned in 1993, on-air interaction between Wogan and members of the production team became far more widespread, and from around the late 1990s, emails became the most prominent method by which listeners would contact the show.

The show was produced by Paul Walters for over 10 years; in addition to these duties, he traded banter with Wogan and the newsreaders on-air until his declining health, with an illness that had been diagnosed in November 2005, took him away from the studio in late January 2006. He did, however, continue to compile the music for WUTW until his death on 21 October 2006. Alan Boyd (Barrowlands) then took over production duties in Walters' absence, and following his death stayed for the remainder of the show's run. Boyd was at first rarely heard on-air, but often played a part in Wogan's "mini dramas", usually as the dour Scottish soundalike for a Taggart character.

The newsreaders who contributed to the show are Alan Dedicoat ("Deadly"), Fran Godfrey ("Mimi", 1993–2008), John Marsh ("Boggy"), and Charles Nove ("Super/Bossa" 2007–09) who joined the team following John Marsh's semi-retirement in 2007. Each newsreader became a star in their own right, and John Marsh, along with his wife Janet, had their life "stories" told in four Janet and John CDs. All have been released to raise funds for the Children in Need appeal. The regular travel announcer was Lynn Bowles ("Traffic Totty" (2007–09), who joined the show following Marsh's retirement and a change in format. Wogan would often refer to Bowles and the newsreaders as his "underlings", "peons" and "numpties". This was a long-standing gag, used to make light of the fact that listeners who write into other Radio 2 shows (such as Steve Wright in the Afternoon) often address "the Team".

Listeners of Wake Up to Wogan often humorously misnamed the programme as "Wake Up with Wogan".

WUTW was one of the few Radio 2 programmes available which has edited highlights made available as a podcast, starting in 2006.

The show also had a mid-morning slot on Christmas Day from 2000 until 2008.

== Terry's Old Geezers and Gals – "TOGs" ==
Regular listeners to the show were often referred to collectively as "TOGs" ("Terry's Old Geezers" /"Gals"). A running joke on the show was defining what it takes to qualify as a TOG. Much humour was drawn from identifying stereotypical traits of the elderly, such as absent-mindedness, cynicism and befuddlement at modern society's habits, as being those of a true TOG. Wogan, as the archetypal TOG, was sometimes referred to as the "TOGmeister".

TOGs often took on pseudonyms, as did the newsreaders, prior to February 2007.

In early 2007, John Marsh took compulsory semi-retirement at the age of 60, but still returned to the show every six weeks to read the news. Marsh's departure from the show caused a reshuffle of staff, and the introduction of a new Travel Announcer, Lynn Bowles, whom the TOGs often referred to as the "Traffic Totty". Charles Nove also nicknamed "Chassa", "Bossa", and "Super" later became a regular newsreader on the Wake Up to Wogan show and was famed among TOGs for his impression of coughing sheep which became a running gag on the programme. Prior to Marsh's retirement, the travel bulletins were also presented by the morning's newsreader, and Bowles presented them in the shows either side of WUTW.

Younger listeners were sometimes called "TYGs" (Terry's Young Geezers/Gals); a frequent joke being that many TYGs were children forced to listen to WUTW in the car while being driven to school. Often, younger listeners getting in touch with the show were jokingly told to "get lost".

== Regular contributors ==
=== Humorous contributors ===
The show relied heavily on emailed material sent in by listeners that was then read out on air, and there were many regular contributors from the general public. Often a pseudonym was used by the contributor(s) for comic effect. A few of these regular contributors are listed below:

- Mick Sturbs was the author of the Janet and John stories which were sent in to WUTW every three weeks so that they could be read out in the presence of John Marsh. The stories were released on four CD volumes, and the collected scripts have also been published under the title What Janet and John Did Next to raise money for the BBC Children in Need appeal. Betty Bickerdyke often featured in the Janet and John stories, and also appeared in emails relating to "Deadly", particularly those relating to the "Wealdstone Tan and Touch-Up Emporium". Melanie Frontage was a character from the Janet and John stories. See John Run: The Complete Radio 2 Janet and John Marsh Stories as Told by Terry Wogan by Kevin Joslin was published in October 2009.
- Chuffer Dandridge, also a frequent contributor to Wake Up to Wogan, was a resting Shakespearean actor/manager who often emailed into the show to make comments regarding Wogan, or something in the news. He would also mistakenly refer to a road or place featured in the travel bulletins as an old acting friend: "Did I hear Lynn mention my old friend Bradford Bypass?" Chuffer often mentioned his producer/director friend Dickie "Touch" Tingles who was, allegedly, a famous music hall veteran. Another long-running joke was the mention of him being owed a 'white fiver' (a pre-1957 Bank of England £5 note) by that person.
- Barnsley Chop, Dora Jarr, Lou Smorals, Noah Vail, Clodagh Rubbish and Edna Cloud were also regular contributors to the programme, deliberately choosing their pseudonyms as a play on words.
- Crookey of Old Bangor Town, Horatio Q. Birdbath, Katie Mallett and Wilting Baz often wrote poetry based on the day's news stories or an ode to one of the newsreaders.

Often an email was signed off with a name that was a double entendre. Wogan was usually good at cutting off his reading of an email if it started becoming too rude for transmission. Other contributors included Gethin Nunn, Palacia Betts, Tansy Whitebytts and Alan Scape-Gardener.

=== Pause for Thought ===
At around 9:15 am, the programme included a short interlude, where a moment of religious-related opinion was shared with Wogan and the listeners. Regular contributors included:

- Father Brian D'Arcy – Passionist Priest from Ireland, presenter of BBC Radio 2's Sunday Half Hour, also a close friend of Wogan.
- Revd Rob Gillion – Area Dean of Chelsea and Rector of Holy Trinity, Sloane Street
- Lieutenant-Colonel Charles King – Editor-in-chief at the Salvation Army's International HQ
- Rev Richard Littledale of Teddington Baptist Church
- Fidelma Meehan – a member of the National Spiritual Assembly of the Baháʼí Faith in the United Kingdom
- Dharmachari Nagaraja – member of the Glasgow Buddhist Centre
- Julia, Baroness Neuberger – Rabbi of West London Synagogue and member of the House of Lords
- Canon Roger Royle – ordained in the Church of England since 1962
- Rabbi Pete Tobias – of the Liberal Synagogue in Elstree
- Pauline Webb – Vice-President of the Methodist Conference

== Holidays and cover ==
Wogan was noted for the amount of holiday leave he took, and had numerous presenters cover his absence over the years.

Originally, Dawn Patrol host Sarah Kennedy covered for him after persuading then Radio 2 Controller Frances Line that she was most suitable for the job. A couple of "dubious" moments whilst Kennedy was in the chair during the late 1990s under James Moir's reign, however, resulted in Ed Stewart or Alex Lester being granted the accolade. In the last few years of the show Johnnie Walker usually deputised for Wogan, although Richard Allinson also frequently took this role. Allinson tended to cover the show during Bank Holidays, and also during Walker's absence from the station (undergoing treatment for cancer) in late 2003 and 2004. Jonathan Ross also covered the programme for a week in 2004 and again in 2005.

During the Christmas break in 2007, Top Gear presenter Richard Hammond covered the show's slot for several days. From 2008 until Wogan's final holiday leave prior to his retirement from the breakfast show in October 2009, Johnnie Walker had been the usual stand-in for Wogan. Contributors often used to joke that Wogan was, in fact, the stand-in for Walker.
