= Banbury Sound =

- Banbury; England
- Broadcast area: Banburyshire (northern Oxfordshire)
- Frequencies: 95.9 and 107.6 MHz

Programming
- Format: AC

Ownership
- Owner: Quidem

History
- First air date: 25 February 2006

Banbury Sound was an Independent Local Radio station serving the Banbury and Brackley areas of north Oxfordshire. Before its closure, it was owned and operated by Quidem and broadcast from studios at Honiley, Warwickshire.

== History ==
Banbury Sound was initially launched as Touch FM on Saturday, 25 February 2006. The station's first broadcast featured breakfast presenter Dale Collins, with the inaugural news bulletin read by group editor Daniel Bruce. Owned by the Cumbria-based CN Group, it was the third station in the network to adopt the Touch FM branding, alongside sister stations in Coventry and Stratford-upon-Avon. Outside of breakfast and drivetime slots, programming was networked between the three stations.

The station changed owners on 1 April 2009, making it part of Banbury Broadcasting Company Limited - with staff members John Crutch (Station Director), Anneka Naysmith (Sales Director) and Dale Collins (Director of Programming) as partners in the buyout. Two months later, the station relaunched as Banbury Sound and introduced a full schedule of local output from its studios in the Grimsbury area of Banbury

After the station was sold again to Touch FM's new owners, Quidem, in October 2010, the station co-located to studios at Honiley in Warwickshire and re-introduced networked programming outside of breakfast.

In September 2019, Quidem announced it had entered a brand licensing agreement with Global, citing financial losses. Two months later, following permission from regulator, Ofcom to change the station's format, it was confirmed Banbury Sound would merge with its Quidem-owned sister stations and launch as Capital Mid-Counties on 2 December 2019.

Local output for the Mid-Counties region consists of a three-hour regional Drivetime show on weekdays, alongside localised news bulletins, traffic updates and advertising for North Oxfordshire. Banbury Sound ceased broadcasting at 7pm on Friday 29 November 2019.
