= The Big Toe Radio Show =

British children's radio show

The Big Toe Radio Show was a daily show (seven days a week) for children on the DAB radio station BBC 7 at breakfast time and from 4 to 6 pm. It was aimed at children aged nine to eleven. It featured music, games, stories read from well-known books such as those by Roald Dahl and fun. It began in December 2002, as BBC 7 launched

A notable feature was the involvement of children in the making of the programme. Each day, three children were invited to the specially designed studios at Broadcasting House. Becoming part of the Big Toe team for the day, the children could see the 'behind-the-scenes' aspects of making a radio programme. If they wished to, they could also take part in the on-air features, often having the opportunity of interviewing visiting guests such as musicians, authors, scientists, and sports stars.

Its counterpart was the hour-long The Little Toe Radio Show for children beginning school of age four to seven, which was broadcast daily at 7 am and 3 pm. In 2003, the Big Toe Reporters' Club was formed where children reported on current affairs pertaining to them – often very different from topics found on conventional current affairs programmes.

== Big Toe Books ==
The Big Toe Radio Show ended on 16 March 2007, but the format was adapted to become the hour-long Big Toe Books on BBC Radio 7 at 4 pm on weekdays and 8 am on weekends. The show consisted of a presenter (Christopher Pizzey, formerly Kirsten O'Brien) introducing the story or summarising previous episodes. The last episode was broadcast on BBC Radio 4 Extra on Saturday 2 April 2011.
