= CN Group =

English news media company

- Company type: Holding, limited company
- Industry: Media
- Founded: 1815
- Defunct: 2019
- Successor: Newsquest
- Headquarters: Carlisle, Cumbria
- Key people: Lord Inglewood (Chairman); Miller Hogg (CEO)
- Products: Broadcasting, newspapers, magazines
- Website: cngroup.co.uk

CN Group Limited was an independent local media business based in Carlisle, Cumbria, England, operating in print and radio. It is now owned by Newsquest and their newspapers are printed in Glasgow.

The company was formerly known as the Cumbrian Newspapers Group Ltd but changed its name to reflect the fact that is no longer primarily a newspaper publisher. One of its principal subsidiaries, however, is still known as Cumbrian Newspapers Ltd.

== History ==
The company can trace its origins to the founding of the Carlisle Patriot newspaper in 1815, which eventually became the Cumberland News. Historical copies of the Carlisle Patriot, dating back to 1817, are available to search and view in digitised form at The British Newspaper Archive.

== Radio ==
Until 2017, CN Group owned two radio stations: Lancaster-based The Bay and Kendal-based Lakeland Radio. In October 2017 it was announced that both had been sold to the UK media company Global.

The company formerly owned the Touch Radio Network stations in the Midlands outright until selling them to Quidem in June 2009. The two exceptions to this were the Loughborough licence, Oak FM, which was sold to the Lincs FM Group, and the Banbury Touch FM licence, which was sold to a private consortium and relaunched as Banbury Sound. It quickly became apparent that operating these licences outside of the regional network was not a commercially sensible move. As a result, Quidem acquired Banbury Sound in 2010 and Oak FM in 2012, effectively reforming the original CN Midlands network. In September 2019, it was announced that Quidem, the station's current owners, were running at a financial loss and the business had entered into a brand-licensing agreement with Global Radio. This change means that the Quidem group of stations will take one of Global's brands. At the beginning of October, Ofcom opened a consultation following Quidem's request for its six stations to make significant changes to their formats.

CN previously owned Mid FM in Northern Ireland. CN also previously owned Belfast CityBeat until January 2015 when it was sold to the Q Radio Network.

They also had a shareholding in Carlisle-based CFM Radio, holding a further stake in neighbouring Border Television.

== Titles ==
CN Group publishes daily and weekly newspapers and magazines for Cumbria, Northumberland, Dumfries and Galloway and the Scottish Borders. Since the takeover of the CN Group by Newsquest, it is now printed in Glasgow.

=== List of CN Group titles ===
==== Newspapers ====
- 24 – The North’s National – a weekday evening paper, launched 20 June 2016, closed 29 July 2016
- News and Star – daily evening paper circulated with separate East (except Friday and Sunday) and West (except Sunday) editions
- North-West Evening Mail – daily paper circulated in Furness and other parts of south Cumbria
- The Cumberland News – weekly (Fridays) covering East Cumbria; separate Main and Late Final editions
- Cumbrian Gazette – weekly freesheet; separate editions for East and West Cumbria
- Whitehaven News – weekly (Thursdays)
- Times & Star – weekly (Fridays); separate Workington, Maryport and Cockermouth editions
- Hexham Courant – weekly
- Eskdale and Liddesdale Advertiser – weekly (Thursdays)
- Advertiser – commercially selective postcode distributed weekly freesheet covering South Cumbria

==== Magazines ====
- Cumbria Life – monthly
- Carlisle Living – monthly
- Dumfries & Galloway Life' – monthly (covering Dumfries & Galloway and Scottish Borders); formerly DGB Life
- In Cumbria – quarterly
- Events
- Lakesman' – yearly
- The Bay' – bimestrial lifestyle magazine dedicated to the unique communities of Morecambe Bay, UK; launched in June 2017

== Printing ==
CN Group prints items such as newspapers (local and national), magazines and leaflets.
