= List of BBC Radio 2 timeslots and presenters =

List of BBC Radio 2 timeslots and presenters summarises the principal Radio 2 timeslots since its launch in 1967 and the presenters who have occupied them. Times are typical for each era and may have varied by a few minutes across decades. All dates are taken from BBC Genome listings, BBC press releases, and major news coverage.

== Scope and method ==
This list covers the core weekday and weekend strands that have defined the Radio 2 schedule: Early Breakfast, Breakfast, Mid-morning, Lunchtime / Current Affairs, Afternoon, Drivetime, Evening / Specialist, and selected long-running weekend fixtures such as Sunday Love Songs. Each section provides a summary paragraph, a table of presenters (with duration) and a visual timeline.

== Weekday timeslots ==
=== Early Breakfast ===
The early-morning strand (usually 04:00–06:00/06:30) has traditionally warmed up the station before the main breakfast show. It began with rotating continuity presenters in 1967, later gaining fixed hosts including Sarah Kennedy and Vanessa Feltz. Since 2023, it has been hosted by Owain Wyn Evans.

BBC Radio 2 Early Breakfast — presenters
#	Presenter	From	To	Duration	Notes
1	Various continuity announcers	1967	1979	12 years	Early mixed-music strand preceding Breakfast Special.
2	Ray Moore	1979	1986	7 years	Introduced humour and listener interaction.
3	Sarah Kennedy	1993	2010	17 years	The Dawn Patrol; long-running early show.
4	Vanessa Feltz	2011	2022	11 years	Live weekday editions; later moved to TalkTV.
5	Owain Wyn Evans	2023	present	3 years+	Current presenter.

---

=== Breakfast ===
The flagship breakfast show has always been the centrepiece of Radio 2's schedule. It launched as Breakfast Special in 1967 before becoming The Radio 2 Breakfast Show, most notably hosted by Terry Wogan, Chris Evans, Zoe Ball and Scott Mills (See main article: The Radio 2 Breakfast Show.)

BBC Radio 2 Breakfast Show — presenters
#	Presenter	From	To	Duration	Notes
1	Various (Breakfast Special)	30 September 1967	2 January 1970	2 years, 94 days	Rotating presenters during early years.
2	John Dunn	5 January 1970	31 March 1972	2 years, 86 days	Regular weekday host.
3	Terry Wogan	3 April 1972	28 December 1984	12 years, 269 days	Established conversational tone.
4	Ken Bruce	7 January 1985	4 April 1986	1 year, 87 days	Interim before Derek Jameson.
5	Derek Jameson	7 April 1986	20 December 1991	5 years, 257 days	Added phone-ins and current affairs.
6	Brian Hayes	6 January 1992	23 December 1992	352 days	Short tenure.
7	Terry Wogan	4 January 1993	18 December 2009	16 years, 348 days	Wake Up to Wogan era.
8	Chris Evans	11 January 2010	24 December 2018	8 years, 347 days	High-energy format.
9	Zoe Ball	14 January 2019	20 December 2024	5 years, 341 days	First female host.
10	Scott Mills	27 January 2025	24 March 2026	1 year, 57 days	Sacked for historic allegations.
11	Sara Cox	6 July 2026	present		Current host.

---

=== Mid-morning ===
The mid-morning show (traditionally 09:30–12:00) evolved from a light-entertainment strand in the 1970s into one of the station's biggest music-and-chat shows. It became synonymous with Ken Bruce, who fronted the slot for over three decades until he left for commercial radio in 2023.

BBC Radio 2 Mid-morning — presenters
#	Presenter	From	To	Duration	Notes
1	Various presenters	1967	1970	3 years	Rotated among continuity-style hosts in the early years.
2	Pete Murray	1970	1973	3 years	Brought a pop-oriented tone to the slot.
3	Jimmy Young	1973	1979	6 years	Moved here before later taking over the lunchtime current-affairs show.
4	John Dunn	1979	1981	2 years	Brief tenure before moving to Drivetime.
5	Ray Moore	1981	1984	3 years	Returned to daytime with a conversational style.
6	Ken Bruce	1984	1986	2 years	First spell in mid-morning, with a break between January 1985 and April 1986 when he presented Breakfast.
7	Ken Bruce	1986	1990	4 years	Returned following the Derek Jameson breakfast era.
8	Judith Chalmers	1990	1991	1 year	Katie Boyle presented the show for some of this period.
9	Ken Bruce	1992	2023	31 years	Longest-serving host, introduced PopMaster in February 1998.
10	Vernon Kay	2023	present	3 years+	Took over in May 2023.

---

=== Lunchtime / Current Affairs ===
Since 1973, this slot has provided news, interviews and listener discussion, first with Jimmy Young and then Jeremy Vine.

BBC Radio 2 Lunchtime / Current Affairs — presenters
#	Presenter	From	To	Duration	Notes
1	Various magazine shows	1967	1973	6 years	Mixed factual content.
2	Jimmy Young	1973	2002	29 years	The Jimmy Young Show.
3	Jeremy Vine	2003	present	23 years+	The Jeremy Vine Show.

---

=== Afternoon ===
The post-lunch block (14:00–17:00) mixes features, interviews and music. Steve Wright's long-running Steve Wright in the Afternoon defined the slot from 1999 to 2022.

BBC Radio 2 Afternoon — presenters
#	Presenter	From	To	Duration	Notes
1	Ed Stewart	1972	1979	7 years	Ed Stewart’s Show.
2	Gloria Hunniford	1982	1995	13 years	Magazine and music format.
3	Steve Wright	1999	2022	23 years	Landmark entertainment show.
4	Scott Mills	2022	2024	2 years	Music-driven successor before move to breakfast.
5	Trevor Nelson	2025	present	1 year+	Successor under 2025 refresh.

---

=== Drivetime ===
The Drivetime show (currently 16:00–19:00) has combined music, interviews and news updates since the late 1970s. Its most recent long tenure was Simon Mayo's run (2010–2018), followed by Sara Cox from 2019 to 2026.

BBC Radio 2 Drivetime — presenters
#	Presenter	From	To	Duration	Notes
1	John Dunn	1976	1998	22 years	Established drivetime identity.
2	Johnnie Walker	1999	2006	7 years	Music-led show with interviews.
3	Chris Evans	2006	2009	3 years	Up-tempo, audience-driven style.
4	Simon Mayo	2010	2018	8 years	Simon Mayo Drivetime.
5	Jo Whiley & Simon Mayo	2018	2018	~7 months	Joint hosting (May–December 2018).
6	Sara Cox	2019	2026	7 years	Last 30 minutes was the Half-Wower from Monday to Thursday, with an all-request show on Fridays.

---

== Weekend fixtures ==
=== Sunday Love Songs ===
Sunday Love Songs (09:00–11:00) has aired since 1996. Created and long hosted by Steve Wright, it continues as a listener-dedication show. Michael Ball took over in 2024 following Wright's death.

BBC Radio 2 Sunday Love Songs — presenters
#	Presenter	From	To	Duration	Notes
1	Steve Wright	31 March 1996	11 February 2024	28 years	Creator and original host.
2	Liza Tarbuck	18 February 2024	18 February 2024	–	Presented a tribute show to Wright.
3	Nicki Chapman	25 February 2024	26 May 2024	–	Interim continuation.
4	Michael Ball	2 June 2024	present	—	Current host.

---

== See also ==
- BBC Radio 2
- The Radio 2 Breakfast Show
- BBC Radio 1
- BBC Light Programme
