= Frances Line =

British broadcasting executive (1940–2021)

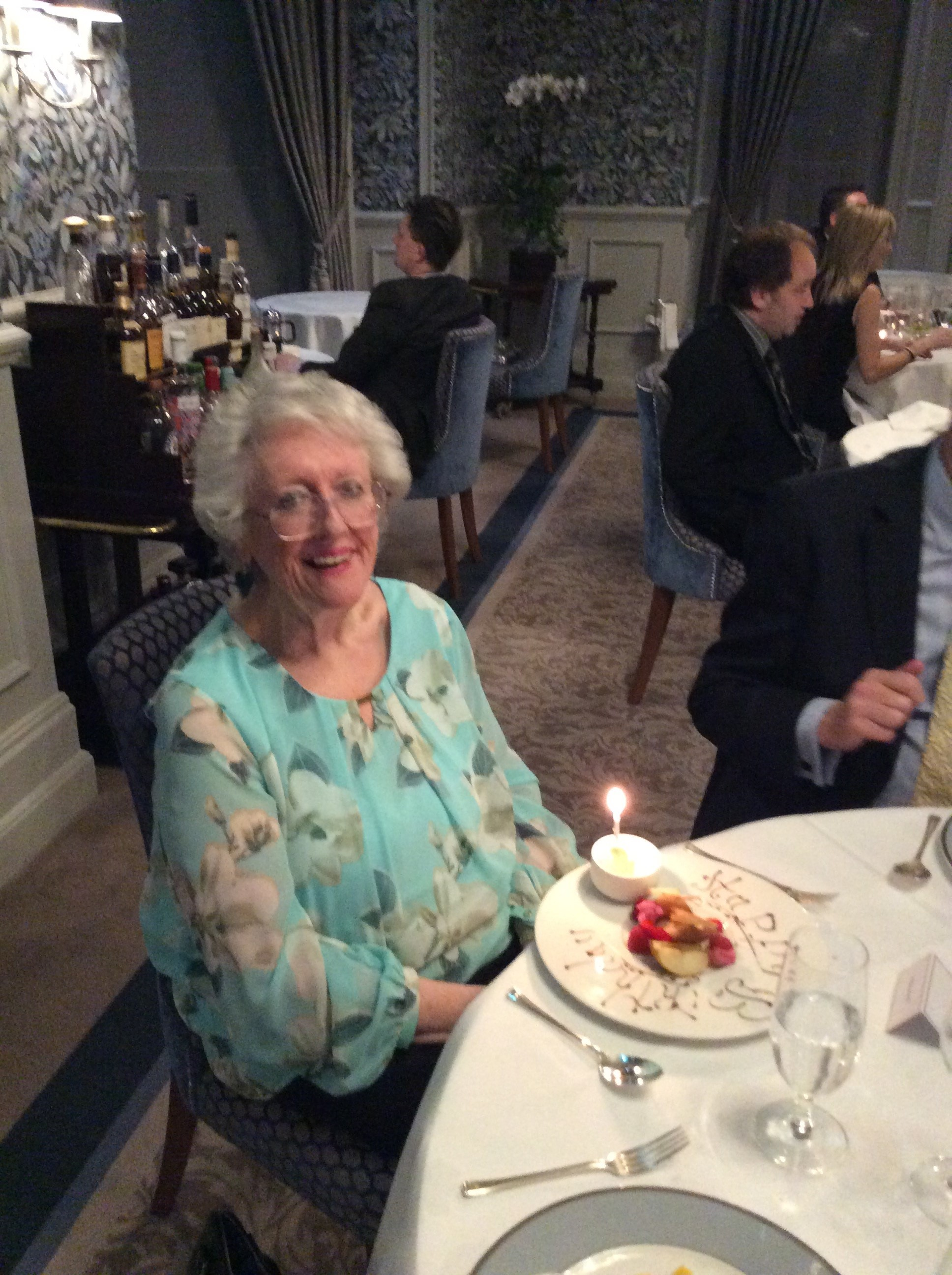
- Born: 22 February 1940; Croydon, Surrey, England, U.K.
- Died: 13 October 2021 (aged 81)
- Occupation: Broadcasting executive
- Known for: First female Controller of BBC Radio 2
- Spouse: Jim Lloyd (m. 1971)

Frances Mary Line OBE (22 February 1940 – 13 October 2021), whose married name was Frances Lloyd, was a British radio executive. From 1990 to 1996, she was Controller of BBC Radio 2, the first woman to hold the post and only the third to run a BBC Radio network after Clare Lawson Dick and Monica Sims, Controllers of Radio 4 from 1975–76 and 1978–83 respectively. Line had previously worked at the BBC as a clerk-typist, secretary, producer's assistant on BBC Television, and producer and then Head of Music on Radio 2.

== Early life and education ==
Line was born in Croydon on 22 February 1940, the first child of Charles Edward Line, a bank manager, and Leoni Lucy Line (née Hendriks). Her maternal grandfather, Theodore Johan Hubert Hendriks, was Dutch and worked as a hairdresser at the Elizabeth Arden salon under the name of "Mr Robert". Her sister, Julia "Jools" Evelyn Line, was born on 24 July 1947, and became a writer on the occult and a cross-stitch sampler designer.

Line was raised in Norbury, where she lived opposite Peter Sarstedt, with whom she later worked as a producer. She attended Winterbourne Primary School and then won a scholarship to James Allen's Girls' School (JAGS) in Dulwich, the sister school of Dulwich College. She left school with six GCE O levels and a swimming certificate so that, unlike most BBC radio controllers, she was not a graduate, but, as she quipped, "an unqualified success". She believed, however, that this gave her a better understanding of what her audience wanted: "I am able to represent the listeners because I am one of them".

Elocution, ballet and piano lessons, and visits to seaside concert parties in Eastbourne and to local venues such as the Croydon Grand Theatre and Streatham Hill Theatre, had made her keen to go into show business, but her father suggested that she should prudently pursue "Show Business with a PENSION", and this meant the BBC.

== From Clerk-Typist to Senior Secretary ==
Line presented herself for interview at the BBC at the age of 16, while still at school, and declared that her long-term ambition was to be a producer, arousing much amusement in the lady who was interviewing her. She landed a job as a clerk-typist and began work at the BBC at a salary of £6.13s a week, rising to £9.5s.6d after she passed the Proficiency Tests for Junior Secretaries in June 1959. She took full advantage of the free tickets that were available to attend BBC audience shows at studios such as the Paris Theatre, formerly a cinema, at 12 Lower Regent Street; 201 Piccadilly; and the Playhouse Theatre in Northumberland Avenue.

Line moved on from Administration to a job as Production Secretary in the BBC Light Programme, the forerunner of Radio 2. She spent some time as second secretary on the comedy series The Navy Lark and worked for a short while on the variety programme the Billy Cotton Band Show. After she became secretary to Brian Matthew, who was then, most unusually, both a BBC producer and presenter, she was involved with two major pop programmes of the period – Saturday Club and Easy Beat. She also coined the title for a series on which she worked that featured an up-and-coming group: Pop Go the Beatles. All she could later recall of the Beatles themselves, however, was that "they made paper darts out of [her] carefully typed scripts and threw them at each other", which she deeply resented.

When Brian Matthew was especially hard-pressed, he would allow Line to undertake tasks that exceeded her remit as a Secretary, such as talking to artists about the songs they would be performing and, occasionally, choosing a record for the programme. Still only 20 years old, she found this "very exciting" and began to develop the skills that would stand her in good stead as a producer. On 22 February 1961, Line's twenty-first birthday, Matthew let her cast a whole Easy Beat show; she took much time and care over this and aimed to make her selection as "dispassionate" as possible, but was glad to be able justifiably to include one of her favourite groups as they were then chart-toppers: Kenny Ball and His Jazzmen.

Line continued to progress upwards through the Secretarial Grades in BBC Radio but reached a ceiling beyond which no secretary could rise.

== From Producer's Assistant to Producer ==
Line therefore moved to television and became a Producer's Assistant (PA) in Light Entertainment, where she worked on musical, drama and comedy series: Juke Box Jury; the very first episode of Top of the Pops, broadcast on 1 January 1964 and starting off with The Rolling Stones live from a converted church in Manchester; Z-Cars; Blandings Castle, based on the P.G. Wodehouse stories; and Meet the Wife with Thora Hird and Freddie Frinton.

At that time, however, very few women were employed in the higher echelons of television, and Line once more found her upward progress blocked. In contrast, BBC Radio was beginning to encourage its female secretaries to train as producers and so Line returned to radio, her first love, as a junior producer. Despite the greater opportunities BBC radio offered to women, gender discrimination remained: Line was one of six new producers, three men and three women, but the three permanent staff posts went to the men and the three temporary posts to the women; the rationale for this was that the men probably had families to support while the women had only themselves and were likely to get married eventually.

Line was, however, delighted to be a producer "in the last glow of the golden days of Radio. The old Light Programme – the days of really funny comedy, of live music and massive listening figures. The days when Radio was king". One of her first assignments was on the series Music While You Work. She worked with many popular music stars of the time, including Victor Sylvester, Edmundo Ros, the Oscar Rabin Band, Cyril Stapleton and Acker Bilk.

When the Light Programme morphed into Radio 2 in 1967, Line became a producer of the series Roundabout and then produced Folk on Friday, introduced by her future husband, Jim Lloyd, who had an extensive knowledge of the folk scene. Line and Lloyd married in 1972; she had two step-children from Lloyd's first marriage.

Line also produced Tony Brandon's afternoon show; Sam Costa's late afternoon show; Joe "Mr Piano" Henderson's afternoon show; early morning shows hosted by Tom Edwards and Colin Berry; and John Dunn's Drivetime.

== From Chief Assistant to Controller ==
By 1980, Line had decided to move from production into management; she became a Chief Assistant, a Controller's right-hand person with particular responsibility for network scheduling. She was Chief Assistant to David Hatch, who was Controller of Radio 2 and then of Radio 4. An especially challenging task in this role was the scheduling of Radio 4 bulletins on the Falklands War, which Line discharged successfully. Throughout the war, Radio 4 kept all its listeners and gained many hundreds of thousands more who still used radio, rather than television, as their primary information source.

In late 1985, Line returned to Radio 2 as the network's first female Head of Music; Bryant Marriott was the Controller at that time. Line aimed to clarify the station's musical identity in terms that would enhance its appeal to older listeners; her keywords were "melody, familiarity, excellence and breadth"'. Line was quoted in The Times (21 January 1986) as saying: "Radio 2 had been drifting about without a clear music policy. The youth audience has been overindulged and now it is time to return to the over-40s. There are an awful lot of over-40s in the country and perhaps some of them have given us up in the past". Big band and jazz would predominate on Mondays, "big strings sounds" and a series about past and present musical stars on Tuesdays, and folk music on Wednesdays. Line's focus was on daytime programming, when Radio 2 had the most listeners, but she did recruit Paul Jones, an actor and once the singer with the group Manfred Mann, to host a new blues and country music series in the evening.

Not everyone welcomed the over-40s emphasis: DJ David Hamilton, for example, departed from Radio 2 in high dudgeon, calling the network "geriatric" and complaining that "there’s only so much Max Bygraves and Vera Lynn you can play". However, Line's changes proved popular with a substantial audience.

One of Line's most notable achievements in this phase of her career was to persuade Bryant Marriott that the network should hire Derek Jameson, whom she had seen on a BBC 2 TV programme called Do They Mean Us? and thought would be the person for radio. Jameson began presenting Radio 2's breakfast show on 7 April 1986; in mid-May the BBC declared that he had "increased the number of listeners by 500,000, or 25 per cent" and Jameson himself was reported as claiming that listeners' letters "were coming in at the rate of 500 a week and all but a handful approved of his style".

At the end of the decade, Line succeeded Bryant Marriott as Controller.

== Line as Controller ==
On 1 January 1990, Line took up her post as Controller of Radio 2. Her aim was "to make Radio 2 as good as I possibly could, and the top station"'. Over the next five years, she turned it from a network that had been "something of a joke" into one that started to be "taken much more seriously", as Robert Hanks expressed it in an Independent article in 1996.

In her first three months, Line moved Brian Matthew from the Round Midnight slot he had occupied for 12 years to the Saturday morning programme Sounds of the '60s, and dismissed Adrian Love.

As Controller, Line pursued a programming policy that combined music aimed at listeners in their fifties, as she herself was at the time, with a thrice-weekly arts series, and discussions on contemporary issues. She recruited Sheridan Morley to present a weekend arts programme that, in Sue Gaisford's view, proved to be as good as, and sometimes better than, its competitors on Radio 3 and Radio 4; moved Derek Jameson, in January 1992, from the breakfast show to a four-day-a-week late-night slot between 10.30pm and 12.00 midnight with his wife, Ellen; persuaded Terry Wogan to return to Radio 2 in January 1993, where he took over the breakfast show Good Morning UK! (duly renamed Wake Up to Wogan) from the Australian broadcaster Brian Hayes; inaugurated Hayes's own weekly phone-in current affairs programme Hayes over Britain, and his Saturday and Sunday slots; secured Michael Aspel's services for a Sunday morning programme; made the Reverend Canon Roger Royle the regular presenter of Sunday Half Hour from September 1990, a role he fulfilled until April 2007; and brought in Sarah Kennedy in 1993 to front the early morning show The Dawn Patrol.

The BBC Annual Report in July 1994 praised Radio 2 for keeping its audience share the year before in spite of greater competition and for retaining the loyalty of its older listeners. Radio Joint Audience Research (RAJAR) figures released on 24 October 1994 showed it had become Britain's most popular radio station in terms of audience share – 12.9 per cent compared to its nearest rival, Radio 1, which had 11.8 per cent (though the latter still had more listeners).

During 1994, Radio 2 featured appearances by a constellation of stars such as José Carreras, Cybill Shepherd and Dame Kiri Te Kanawa, some of whom performed exclusively for the network. It also offered a series of classic musicals such as Finian's Rainbow, Guys and Dolls, Salad Days and Sweeney Todd: The Demon Barber of Fleet Street, implementing one of Line's clear policy objectives: "In the same way that Radio 3 is the home of the opera, we have consciously decided that Radio 2 is to be the home of the musical".

Radio 2 also offered programmes tackling controversial and difficult topics such as testicular cancer and prostate problems, in the July 1994 campaign Man Matters, and domestic violence, in the October 1994 programme When Home Is Where The Hurt Is.

In the spring of 1995, Radio 2 was named UK Station of the Year at the Sony Radio Awards. In the same year, Line was elected a Fellow of the Radio Academy and in the 1996 New Year Honours list she was appointed OBE for services to broadcasting.

Line knew that her network lost around 200,000 listeners annually to what was called in the BBC "Radio Grim Reaper" and she aimed to attract younger people to Radio 2 by scheduling "access points" for "the Beatles generation" – itself, of course, growing older – while retaining the loyalty of its core audience. She could still, however, sometimes anger segments of that core audience. Her temporary substitution, in autumn 1989, of a Gilbert and Sullivan season which saw the weekly programmes by two much-loved Sunday presenters – Benny Green and Alan Dell – dropped for the duration of the season, provoked a phalanx of elderly listeners to picket Broadcasting House in protest, bearing banners declaring "LINE IS OUT OF ORDER".

Hate mail was frequent, as Line recalled: "I've lost count of the number of letters which began 'You cow... ' or 'Are You completely mad...'". Once when she moved David Jacobs's programme, she received a picture of herself, cut from a newspaper, with her eyes poked out.

Line's husband Jim Lloyd thought she received more insults because she was a woman; she was also menaced by a stalker and, for over five years, by a never-identified person completing small advertisements in her name so that she received a hearing aid and then several daily phone calls from people selling insurance or double glazing or proposing to deliver concrete to her home.

There were also, however, many accolades from listeners, for instance from "Norm", who cut out cartoon strips of Garfield the Cat, whited out the words in the balloons, and put in his own texts praising Radio 2. A "Mr S" from Hull invoked Shakespeare's Romeo and Juliet in a laudatory verse:

For she doth teach the torches to burn bright
And entertains me late into the night
With harmony, and melody and mirth
On Radio 2 – the greatest show on earth.

Line retired from "the greatest show on earth" in February 1996 and Jim Moir replaced her.

== Life after retirement ==
Line moved with her husband to Eastbourne, where she had once enjoyed the concert parties that contributed to her desire to enter show business. Under her married name of Frances Lloyd, she was a Vice-President of the Eastbourne Society and a member of the Eastbourne Ashridge Circle, possibly Britain's largest lecture society; from 2012, she was a Director of Marlborough Court (Eastbourne) Ltd, where she lived, and for several years she edited its newsletter; she was also one of the Ambassadors for Eastbourne Theatres, helping to promote and publicise their shows.

Frances Line died on 13 October 2021, at the age of 81. Her funeral service at Eastbourne Crematorium took place on 2 November 2021 and was conducted by the Reverend Canon Roger Royle, whom she had appointed as the regular presenter of Sunday Half Hour when she was Controller of Radio 2.
