= Chris Stuart =

British journalist (1949–2022)

- Born: Christopher Elliot Stuart; 19 February 1949; Durham, England
- Died: 12 July 2022 (aged 73)
- Education: New College, Oxford
- Occupation(s): Broadcaster, journalist
- Known for: BBC Radio Wales; BBC Radio 2; Only Connect
- Spouse: Megan Stuart
- Children: 4

Christopher Elliot Stuart (19 February 1949 – 12 July 2022) was a British journalist, songwriter and radio and television presenter and producer. He was executive producer of the BBC Two quiz series Only Connect. As a presenter, he fronted the early breakfast show on BBC Radio 2 between 1988 and 1991. He was also one of the first presenters on BBC Radio Wales.

== Life and career ==
Stuart was born in Durham on 19 February 1949 and grew up in Manchester, Hull, Birmingham, Nottinghamshire, before his family settled in Leicestershire. He read philosophy, politics and economics at New College, Oxford, and after graduation moved to Wales where he began working as a journalist for the Western Mail. He was also a musician and a member of the comedy band "Baby Grand", who had two BBC Two TV series and released an album on the Decca label.

In 1978, he joined the newly formed BBC Radio Wales and hosted the station's breakfast show, AM, for almost ten years. On television, Stuart hosted the 1989 BBC Cardiff Singer of the World competition and also fronted his own chat show on BBC Wales called The Chris Stuart Cha Cha Chat Show. He had been an active songwriter and, among other music credits, composed the theme tunes and incidental music for the animation series SuperTed and Sali Mali, both produced by Calon.

In 1985, Stuart began working on BBC Radio 2 as stand-in presenter, mainly covering for Roger Royle on Good Morning Sunday and for Ray Moore on the station's early breakfast show. When Moore left in 1988, due to health issues, Stuart replaced him for three years and after Frances Line became station controller, he moved to the late night programme until the beginning of 1992, when he was replaced by Derek Jameson and his wife.

Stuart remained associated with Radio 2; for three years he hosted the Saturday film review show and continued to stand-in for other presenters including Terry Wogan, Jimmy Young, Gloria Hunniford, and John Dunn.

For Radio 4 he presented several series of the science quiz, Inspiration and also worked as a network commentator on major events including the funeral services of Diana, Princess of Wales and Queen Elizabeth The Queen Mother. For more than two decades, he commentated on the annual RBL Festival of Remembrance at the Royal Albert Hall. Stuart also remained associated with BBC Radio Wales, presenting the station's Saturday sports coverage for five years. In 2014, Radio Wales paid tribute to him as part of series called Radio Greats.

== Personal life ==
In 1978, Stuart married Caroline Lynch-Blosse. They had a daughter Josephine, but the marriage ended in divorce. Stuart then married Megan, a former Editor of BBC Radio Wales and producer on Radio 4's Woman's Hour. They had three children and Stuart was also father to another child from a previous marriage. In 1992, Stuart and his wife set up an independent production company called Presentable, whose wide-ranging output included Late Night Poker for Channel 4, as well as Only Connect. The company was sold in 2006 to RDF Media who subsequently merged with Zodiak Media.

Stuart died from colorectal cancer on 12 July 2022, at the age of 73. The 18th series of Only Connect was dedicated in his memory.
