= The Radio 2 Breakfast Show =

UK radio programme

- Other names: Breakfast Special (1967–1972); Good Morning UK! (1992); Wake Up to Wogan (1993–2009); The Chris Evans Breakfast Show (2010–2018); The Zoe Ball Breakfast Show (2019–2024); The Scott Mills Breakfast Show (2025–2026); The Sara Cox Breakfast Show (2026–present)
- Genre: Music, chat, news
- Running time: 210 mins (1968–1972); 120 mins (1972–1978, 1986–91, 1994–2009); 150 mins (1978–1986, 1993, 2010); 180 mins (1967, 1992, 2010–present)
- Country of origin: United Kingdom
- Language: English
- Home station: BBC Radio 2
- Hosted by: Sara Cox
- Starring: Ellie Brennan; Matthew Carter
- Produced by: Patrick Thomas
- Recording studio: Broadcasting House, London (1967–2006, 2024–present); Wogan House, London (2006–2024)
- Original release: 30 September 1967
- Audio format: Stereophonic sound
- Website: www.bbc.co.uk/programmes/b0b25n9h

The Radio 2 Breakfast Show is BBC Radio 2's flagship morning show currently hosted by Sara Cox and broadcast since the station's inception on 30 September 1967. The show's longest serving host to date was Sir Terry Wogan, who worked on the programme for almost 30 years in two separate stints, from 3 April 1972 until 28 December 1984, and again from 4 January 1993 until 18 December 2009. The show's shortest serving host to date was Brian Hayes, who hosted the show from 6 January to 23 December 1992.

== History ==
- Data supplied by the BBC Genome Project.

No	Presenter	From	To	Duration
1	John Dunn	5 January 1970	31 March 1972	2 years, 87 days
2	Terry Wogan	3 April 1972	28 December 1984	12 years, 270 days
3	Ken Bruce	7 January 1985	4 April 1986	1 year, 88 days
4	Derek Jameson	7 April 1986	20 December 1991	5 years, 258 days
5	Brian Hayes	6 January 1992	23 December 1992	353 days
6	Terry Wogan	4 January 1993	18 December 2009	16 years, 349 days
7	Chris Evans	11 January 2010	24 December 2018	8 years, 348 days
8	Zoe Ball	14 January 2019	20 December 2024	5 years, 342 days
9	Scott Mills	27 January 2025	24 March 2026	1 year, 57 days
10	Sara Cox	6 July 2026	present	105 days

=== Breakfast Special (Various presenters: 1967–1970) ===
From Radio 2's inception in 1967, a breakfast programme was broadcast in tandem with Radio 1 Breakfast, featuring a mix of news, music, traffic and weather reports. Unlike its Radio 1 counterpart which had started with a single presenter, Breakfast Special was a continuation of a BBC Light Programme format which had been running since 1965 with a roster of presenters who hosted in weekly rotation. These included Paul Hollingdale (the very first weekday presenter), Bruce Wyndham, John Dunn, Peter Latham, and Ray Moore. The music played was largely easy listening of the type with which Radio 2 would be particularly associated until the 1990s. An early feature was "Band of the Day", which would feature recordings of standards and traditional jazz by artists such as Sidney Sax, Frank Chacksfield, Syd Dale and Leon Young.

During its first year the Breakfast Show began at 5:30 am and ended at 8:30 am, at which time Radios 1 and 2 would broadcast the same programme, however in 1968 this was changed to a 9 am finish, after which Radio 2 would broadcast its own programming.

=== John Dunn (1970–1972) ===
Dunn became the first permanent presenter of the show on 5 January 1970, with Ray Moore providing cover. The show was still broadcast during this period between 5:30am and 9:00am.

=== Terry Wogan (First tenure: 1972–1984) ===
On 3 April 1972, Dunn was replaced by Terry Wogan (with Dunn moving to begin his long-running popular Drivetime show). During the Wogan era, the programme was also moved to a later start time of 7 am, with an Early Show preceding it, finishing at 9am. During this period Wogan's cover again principally came from Ray Moore, who presented the Early Show at other times. David Hamilton, who at the time was presenting the Afternoon Show also provided holiday cover. From 3 January 1978 Jimmy Young's programme was moved earlier in the day to follow Wogan, and until the end of its run Wogan's programme was broadcast between 7.30am and 10.00am. Their banter-filled handover became something of a feature. Wogan remained in this role until 28 December 1984; as he left the station for a while to begin presenting his own chat show Wogan on BBC1.

=== Ken Bruce (1985–1986) ===
Wogan was replaced by Ken Bruce, whose first show aired on 7 January 1985. Bruce had presented various Radio 2 programmes after starting at BBC Radio Scotland. Bruce's tenure was brief, his only "crime" apparently being that he "wasn't Terry Wogan". In April 1986 he was moved to the mid-morning slot which, along with brief stints on both the late and early shows in 1990-91, he occupied until 3 March 2023. During the Bruce era, the show was broadcast in a later timeslot between 8.00am and 10.30am.

=== Derek Jameson (1986–1991) ===
On 7 April 1986, Bruce was replaced by journalist Derek Jameson, in a move which proved controversial at the time, as Jameson, although known on television for his contributions to programmes such as What The Papers Say, was not recognised as a radio broadcaster. Even though he made the show more news-based, Jameson became a popular broadcaster, regularly attracting audiences of 10 million, and remained in the role until 20 December 1991. During the Jameson era, the show was reduced by 30 minutes and moved to an earlier timeslot of between 7.30am and 9.30am. The show has continued to end at 9:30am ever since Jameson took over.

From the start of 1987 until August 1990, the programme featured a brief sports desk at 8.31 (an additional sports desk also preceded the start of the programme). The sports desk was removed from the programme when BBC radio's sports coverage transferred to the newly launched Radio 5.

=== Brian Hayes (1992) ===
On 6 January 1992, Jameson was replaced by Brian Hayes, who took over what was still a news-based show and proved to be an even more controversial choice, as his perceived acerbic manner was seen as being at odds with what the Radio 2 breakfast programme had become. Subtitled Good Morning UK!, it did not prove popular and it ended on 23 December 1992. During the Hayes era, the show was extended by one hour and was moved to an earlier start time of 6:30 am. Hayes remains the show's shortest serving presenter.

=== Terry Wogan (Second tenure: 1993–2009) ===
Hayes was replaced by Terry Wogan, who returned to the programme and the station on 4 January 1993, after the axing of his BBC television chat show. From here on in, the news-based elements of the show were dropped, and it returned to its more traditional music and chat style format. Now entitled Wake Up to Wogan, it was the first time the breakfast show had explicitly been given a title other than a generic "breakfast" term, or simply the name of the host, During the second Wogan era, the show was at first reduced by 30 minutes and broadcast between 7:00 am and 9:30 am in its first year. From 17 January 1994 until the end of its run, the show was reduced by another 30 minutes to a 7.30 startup. In January 2006, the show moved to a studio in Western House (renamed Wogan House in 2016), where it was to remain until 2024 when it moved back into Broadcasting House.

On 7 September 2009, Wogan announced that he would step down as the show's host at the end of that year, moving to weekends to present a Sunday mid-morning show called Weekend Wogan, starting on 14 February 2010. He presented his final breakfast programme on 18 December 2009, which marked the end of twenty-eight years over two stints working on the show.

Johnnie Walker then became the interim host of the programme in the period between Wogan's departure and Evans' arrival, from 21 December 2009 until 8 January 2010. Walker was a regular stand-in for Wogan during his later years on the show.

=== Chris Evans (2010–2018) ===
Wogan was replaced by Chris Evans, whose first show aired on 11 January 2010. For its first 10 months on air, the show was extended by 30 minutes and broadcast between 7:00 to 9:30, On 11 October 2010, following Sarah Kennedy's retirement from broadcasting in August, the show was on 6:30 to 9:30. On 3 September 2018, Evans announced his departure from the network and his plan to move to Virgin Radio. His last show was broadcast on 24 December 2018.

The show then used guest hosts Paddy O'Connell, Sara Cox and Mark Goodier in the period between Evans' departure and Ball's arrival, from 26 December 2018 until 11 January 2019.

=== Zoe Ball (2019–2024) ===
Evans was replaced by Zoe Ball, whose first show aired on 14 January 2019, continuing with the same timings used in the Hayes era and since 11 October 2010 of the Evans era. The final breakfast show from Wogan House after 18 years was broadcast on 9 February 2024, after which the show moved back into a studio in Broadcasting House.

Ball was absent from the show for a six-week period from August 2024, during which Scott Mills hosted. Although she returned on 23 September, Ball announced her permanent departure on 19 November 2024, and left on 20 December. Mills was revealed as her successor on air shortly after Ball announced her departure.

Gaby Roslin, Mark Goodier and OJ Borg were the interim hosts between Ball's departure and Mills' arrival, as well as a special episode in December 2024 hosted by the cast of Gavin & Stacey coinciding with the finale of the sitcom.

=== Scott Mills (2025–2026) ===
Mills' official tenure began on 27 January 2025, with Tina Daheley staying on as the regular newsreader and Ellie Brennan replacing Richie Anderson as the new travel news reporter for weekday mornings.

Mills was dismissed by the BBC in March 2026, following a 'complaint about his personal conduct'. His last show was broadcast on 24 March 2026, with Mills' sacking confirmed by the BBC a week later.

Gary Davies hosted the Breakfast Show from 25 March, continuing on an interim basis after Mills' departure was announced, until 3 July.

=== Sara Cox (2026–) ===
On 23 April 2026, the BBC announced that Sara Cox would take over as presenter of The Radio 2 Breakfast Show starting on 6 July, with a presenter to replace her on the drivetime show to be confirmed at a later date.

=== Stand-in presenters ===
Stand-in presenters known to have covered the show include:

- Ray Moore
- David Hamilton
- Sarah Kennedy
- Ed Stewart
- Johnnie Walker
- Richard Allinson
- Jonathan Ross
- Alex Lester
- Ken Bruce
- Aled Jones
- Graham Norton
- Michael Ball
- Fearne Cotton
- Matt Lucas
- Mark Goodier
- Richard Madeley
- Ryan Tubridy
- Patrick Kielty
- Gary Davies
- Nicki Chapman
- Vernon Kay
- Rylan Clark
- Dermot O'Leary
- Amol Rajan
- Paddy O'Connell
- Alan Carr
- Gaby Roslin
- OJ Borg

Zoe Ball, Scott Mills and Sara Cox were also relief presenters for the show prior to becoming its main host.

== Pause for Thought ==
One of the show's longest running features has been "Pause for Thought", a short interlude of religious-related opinion, similar to "Thought for the Day" on BBC Radio 4's Today. It has been broadcast at breakfast time on Radio 2 since 6 April 1970 though it had its roots in a similar spot on the old Light Programme, Five to Ten. It was broadcast around 9:15am until Autumn 2022, when it moved to 7:15am.

In the 1970s, Rev. Frank Thewlis was a frequent "Pause for Thought" guest. He would later write a book Think Again, a compendium of his frequent talks given on the "Pause for Thought" segment. Other regular guests have also written compilation books of their talks.

== See also ==
- Radio 1 Breakfast
