= BBC Radio 2 =

British national radio station

- Logo used since 2022
- London, Salford and Cardiff; United Kingdom
- Frequencies: FM: 88.1–90.2 MHz; DAB: 12B (BBC National DAB); Freeview: 702; Freesat: 702; Sky (UK only): 0102; Virgin Media: 902; Virgin Media Ireland: 908; Astra 2E (28.2°E); Intelsat 901 (18°W)
- RDS: BBC R2

Programming
- Language: English
- Format: Adult contemporary/specialist programming

Ownership
- Owner: BBC
- Sister stations: BBC Radio 6 Music

History
- First air date: 30 September 1967; 59 years ago (as BBC Radio 2); 7 June 1944; 82 years ago (as BBC Allied Expeditionary Forces Programme) (Note: Radio 2 was established to replace BBC Light Programme, which itself replaced BBC Allied Expeditionary Forces Programme. The latter of these first broadcast in 1930. The BBC has had a broadcast since it acquired BBC Allied Expeditionary Forces Programme in 1944.)
- Former call signs: BBC Light Programme
- Former names: BBC Allied Expeditionary Forces Programme (1944–1945); BBC Light Programme (1945–1967)
- Former frequencies: LW: 200 kHz (1967–1978); MW: 693 & 909 kHz (1978–1990), 990 kHz (1983–1990)

Technical information
- Licensing authority: Ofcom

Links
- Website: BBC Radio 2 via BBC Sounds

BBC Radio 2 is a British national radio station owned and operated by the BBC. It is the most popular station in the United Kingdom with over 12 million weekly listeners. It specialises in 20th and 21st century popular music and a range of content. The 'About Radio 2' BBC webpage says: "With a repertoire covering more than 60 years, Radio 2 plays the widest selection of music on the radio - from classic and mainstream pop to country, folk, jazz, musical theatre, soul, hip hop, rock 'n' roll, gospel and blues."

Radio 2 was launched in 1967 to replace the BBC Light Programme. It broadcasts throughout the UK on FM between 88.1 MHz and 90.2 MHz from studios at Broadcasting House in London and MediaCityUK in Salford. Programmes are broadcast on FM radio, digital radio via DAB, digital television and BBC Sounds.

According to RAJAR, the station broadcasts to a weekly audience of 12.6 million with a listening share of 13% as of June 2025.

== History ==
=== 1967–1986 ===
The network was launched at 5:30 a.m. on Saturday 30 September 1967, replacing the BBC Light Programme, with some of the Light Programme's music shows transferring to the newly launched BBC Radio 1. The first show had started on both Radio 1 and Radio 2 but continued with Breakfast Special presented by Paul Hollingdale as Radio 1 separated at 7am for Tony Blackburn. The first record played on Radio 2 was the title track to the 1965 film The Sound of Music by Julie Andrews.

Radio 2 was allocated the Light Programme's longwave and FM frequencies, while Radio 1 used its mediumwave frequencies. In early years, much programming and music was common to both stations, particularly on the shared FM frequency. Radio 1 was targeted at the audience of pirate radio stations, whereas Radio 2 settled down as a middle of the road station playing laid-back pop and rock, folk and country, jazz and big-band music, easy listening, light classical music and oldies, with significant amounts of comedy and sport. Radio 1 continued to take some FM airtime from Radio 2 until being allocated its own, separate FM frequencies in the late 1980s.

Notable broadcasters on Radio 2 in the 1970s and 1980s are Tom Edwards and Ray Moore, who both presented the early breakfast show, Terry Wogan on breakfast, replaced by Ken Bruce and later Derek Jameson; Jimmy Young and his lunchtime current affairs show; David Hamilton on mid-afternoons and John Dunn at what became known as drivetime. In its early years, the station, as the Light Programme had done, played a large amount of specially-recorded music because of needle time restrictions imposed by the Musicians' Union.

On 6 January 1975, broadcasting hours for Radio 2 were reduced due to budget cuts at the BBC. The 5 a.m. – 2 a.m. schedule was scaled back to a 6 a.m. start-up from Mondays to Saturdays, and 6:55 a.m. on Sundays. The station closed down at around 12:30 a.m. each day. However, from 29 September 1975, the closedown was brought forward to 12:10 a.m. on weekdays and 12:33 a.m. on Saturdays and Sundays. There were exceptions, especially over Christmas and New Year periods, when hours would be temporarily extended. The pre-1975 schedule was reinstated on 1 April 1978. On 23 November 1978, the station moved from longwave to mediumwave.

On 27 January 1979, Radio 2 became the first national 24-hour radio station in the UK.

=== Frances Line: 1986–1996 ===
The first half of the 1980s had seen presenters such as Kenny Everett, David Hamilton and Steve Jones increasingly feature more contemporary pop music in their playlists. In response to the controversy these changes had caused in some circles, Frances Line, head of music, repositioned the station in April 1986 to appeal exclusively to the over-50s, introducing older presenters and basing the playlist around nostalgia, easy listening and light music. As a result, David Hamilton quit the station at the end of 1986, claiming the music policy had become "geriatric", although the appointment of Derek Jameson as the host of The Radio 2 Breakfast Show, made to coincide with the changes, did appeal to an older demographic. Although popular with its target audience, the policy alienated many younger listeners, who had listened to both Radio 1 and Radio 2, and the station's audience fell.

In 1990, the station suffered two further blows. It lost its medium wave signal of frequencies 693 and 909, to allow for the launch of BBC Radio 5 (later replaced by BBC Radio 5 Live), and BBC Radio's sports coverage, which had been broadcast on the station's MW frequencies, moved with the frequencies to the new station.

The late 1980s saw the launch of "gold" spinoffs from Independent Local Radio stations across many parts of the UK, playing classic pop and rock. Despite these stations only being available on MW, they still took some of Radio 2's audience, so with the station's audience in decline, a change of emphasis was needed. In 1992, the weekday daytime music policy was slightly adjusted with pre-1950 music primarily confined to Sundays, and the network's playlist of light classical music was reduced following the launch of Classic FM in September 1992. Radio 2's profile was boosted by the return of Terry Wogan at the start of 1993 but, following the generational shift at Radio 1, commercial radio, helped further by the 1993 launch of Virgin Radio, had taken the highest share of the national audience by the mid-1990s.

=== "The Nation's Favourite" – 1996 onwards ===
Line was replaced by James Moir in 1996. Many in the industry thought that this would be a quiet end to his career, but Moir repositioned Radio 2 with a largely AOR/contemporary playlist by day, aimed at a more mature audience than Radio 1 (which, post-Britpop, was again starting to focus on a young audience) but still embracing new music, and more specialist broadcasting by recognised genre experts in the evenings.

Unlike the early-1990s repositioning of Radio 1, in which the BBC lost many well-known names, many former Radio 1 presenters stayed with the corporation and moved across to Radio 2.

Radio 2 has the highest listening figures of any station in the UK, its schedule filled with broadcasters such as Tony Blackburn, Sara Cox, Jeremy Vine, Mark Radcliffe, Trevor Nelson, Jo Whiley, Paul Gambaccini and Gary Davies.

As well as having most listeners nationally, it ranks first in many regions above local radio stations. BBC Radio 2 played to 27% of the available audience in 2006.

The BBC Radio 2 logo, 2007–2021.

In February 2007, Radio 2 recruited Jeff Smith, director of UK and International programming at Napster and a former head of music at Radio 1, as its new head of music. Smith joined the network on 26 March.

In the first quarter of 2011, Radio 2 was part of an efficiency review conducted by John Myers. His role, according to Andrew Harrison, the chief executive of RadioCentre, was "to identify both areas of best practice and possible savings."

On 29 July 2013, Radio 2 changed its "sonic logo" for the first time in 15 years, replacing the one composed by US jingle company GrooveWorx with a new seven-note melody composed by British composer and producer Jem Godfrey. This coincided with the launch of a new jingle package produced by Godfrey in association with Wisebuddah Productions, marking Radio 2's second new package in many years.

Radio 2 has run several "pop-up" DAB services to cover special events, the first being BBC Radio 2 Eurovision, providing coverage of the Eurovision Song Contest 2014. The station returned in 2015 for coverage of Eurovision Song Contest 2015 contest. Others include BBC Radio 2 Country covering the C2C: Country to Country festival and BBC Radio 2 50s, a service dedicated to music programmes covering the 1950s.

During 2018, Radio 2 had numerous presenter reshuffles. In May, drivetime host Simon Mayo was joined by evening DJ Jo Whiley in a new format. The move proved unpopular with listeners, and by October 2018, Mayo announced his intention to leave the station, later adding that this was so he could help launch the new classical music radio station Scala Radio in March 2019, and would continue his BBC Radio 5 Live film review programme. Mayo and Whiley's last show together was broadcast on 20 December 2018, while Whiley moved back to her evening slot, with Mayo's final show on Radio 2 broadcast on 21 December. Sara Cox was later announced as the new drivetime host, starting on 14 January 2019.

In September 2018, Chris Evans announced that he was leaving The Radio 2 Breakfast Show to join Virgin Radio. He was replaced by former Radio 1 Breakfast DJ Zoe Ball on 14 January 2019.

Between 26 and 29 September 2019, Radio 2 broadcast a pop-up DAB station called BBC Radio 2 Beatles to celebrate the 50th anniversary of the release of Abbey Road.

In 2022, the station announced that their annual music festival Radio 2 Live in Hyde Park would not be returning to London's Hyde Park in 2022, but would take place over two days at Temple Newsam Park in Leeds, with acts such as Kaiser Chiefs, Simple Minds and the station's Kitchen Disco presenter Sophie Ellis-Bextor appearing, but it was cancelled due to the death and state funeral of Elizabeth II. The following year, it was announced that Radio 2 in the Park would place in Leicester's Victoria Park, headlined by Kylie Minogue, and featuring Bananarama, Rick Astley, Sam Ryder, James Blunt and Tears for Fears.

Also in 2022, Steve Wright announced that he was to be stepping down from hosting his afternoon show after 23 years. Scott Mills was to replace him, although Wright was to continue hosting his long running Sunday Love Songs show and would also host some special programmes for the station. In late 2023 he was announced as the new host of Pick of the Pops on Saturday afternoons.

On 7 February 2024, the BBC announced plans to launch a spin-off station on DAB and online via BBC Sounds. The Radio 2 spin-off would focus on music from the 1950s, 60s and 70s in a bid to entice some of the station's former listeners back. On 10 April 2025 Ofcom provisionally indicated that it would reject these plans, saying the proposed station "would create a significant adverse impact on fair and effective competition" with "particular significance on the independent Boom Radio". and Ofcom confirmed on 2 July 2025 that the BBC would not be allowed to launch this station.

On 19 November 2024, Zoe Ball revealed that she would be stepping down from hosting the Breakfast Show on Friday 20 December 2024. It was announced that Scott Mills would be taking over as the new host in 2025. The new Scott Mills Breakfast Show launched on Monday 27 January, with Trevor Nelson taking over the station's afternoon slot on the same day. After just over a year on the Breakfast Show, Mills was dismissed from the BBC in March 2026 due to allegations around his "personal conduct". On 23 April, it was announced that Sara Cox would replace him starting that summer, with Gary Davies hosting the programme in the interim.

The new Sara Cox Breakfast Show launched on Monday 6 July 2026. The late afternoon slot vacated by Sara Cox was hosted by Gary Davies and other guest presenters, before Angela Scanlon was announced as the new permanent host of Drivetime starting on 16 November 2026.

== Current position ==
The station's audience is now primarily adults over the age of 35 (82% of listeners) although in recent years it has attracted younger listeners. Its daytime playlist features music from the 1960s to various current chart hits, album and indie music. The station's appeal is broad and deep, with accessible daytime programmes and specialist programmes of particular types or eras of music. In 2009, Radio 2 again won the Music Week Award for National Radio Station of the Year, an award it won for several consecutive years.

Weekday evenings have historically featured specialist music, including jazz, folk, blues, country, reggae, classic rock, show tunes and biographies and documentaries on musical artists and genres. Previously, this specialist programming ran from 20:00–midnight but now runs only from 21:00–22:00. Radio 2 hosts both the BBC Concert Orchestra and the BBC Big Band.

Sounds of the 60s remains a regular fixture on the Saturday schedule, as does Sounds of the 70s on Sundays. On 5 October 2013, these two shows were joined by Sounds of the 80s, which was originally hosted by Sara Cox and broadcast on Friday from 22:00–midnight. In May 2018 Gary Davies took over this show, with Cox was hosting a live 22:00 to midnight slot from Monday–Thursday, until she moved to drivetime on 14 January 2019. As part of a schedule change in July 2022, Sounds of the 80s moved back to Saturday evenings from 20:00–22:00. On Sundays, the schedule reverts closer to its old style, with a focus on easy listening and show tunes, with programmes like Elaine Paige on Sunday.

Radio 2 does not broadcast complete works of classical music or offer in-depth discussion or drama, although some book readings, comedy and arts coverage remains on the station. Jeremy Vine's weekday lunchtime show covers current and consumer affairs in an informal manner, a style pioneered by Jimmy Young. Until the launch of Radio 5 in August 1990, Radio 2's medium wave frequencies carried the majority of BBC Radio's sports coverage.

Like all domestic BBC radio stations, Radio 2 is funded by the television licence fee and does not carry advertising.

The Greenwich Time Signal (also known as "the pips"), which is normally broadcast on Radio 4 and the World Service, is broadcast at 07:00, 08:00 and 17:00 on weekdays, 07:00 and 08:00 on Saturdays, and 07:00, 08:00 and 09:00 on Sundays.

Radio 2 moved its studios from Broadcasting House to the adjacent Western House (renamed Wogan House in 2016) in 2006. Although the majority of programming comes from London, some shows are broadcast from other cities around the UK, including Birmingham and Manchester. For many years, the network's overnight presenters, such as Janice Long and Alex Lester, were based in Birmingham, but made the move to London in April 2008. Since May 2018, the weekday overnight show, now presented by OJ Borg has been broadcast from Salford.

In November 2022, the BBC confirmed plans for Radio 2 and 6 Music to move out of Wogan House, and move back into studios at the nearby BBC Broadcasting House in London. On 18 February 2024, "The Paul Gambaccini Collection" was the final Radio 2 show, and radio show altogether, to be broadcast from Wogan House after 18 years.

Radio 2 broadcasts news bulletins from a studio in Broadcasting House. Bulletins are broadcast 24 hours a day, except Saturday nights at 9pm and during some special events. The station's newsreaders also provide bulletins for 6 Music. Since April 2025, Radio 2 has been simulcasting overnight news bulletins from the World Service via Radio 4.

=== Current presenters ===
- Richie Anderson
- Michael Ball: Love Songs
- Tony Blackburn: Sounds of the 60s and Tony Blackburn's Golden Hour
- Kate Bottley and Jason Mohammad: Good Morning Sunday
- OJ Borg
- Rylan Clark: Rylan on Saturday
- Fearne Cotton: Sounds of the 90s
- Sara Cox: The Sara Cox Breakfast Show
- Jamie Cullum: The Jazz Show
- Gary Davies: Sounds of the 80s
- Sophie Ellis-Bextor: Sophie Ellis-Bextor's Kitchen Disco
- Owain Wyn Evans
- Paul Gambaccini: The Paul Gambaccini Collection
- Mark Goodier: Pick of the Pops
- Angela Griffin: Radio 2 Unwinds
- Vernon Kay: live show and Dance Sounds of the 90s
- Shaun Keaveny: The Rock Show and Sounds of the 70s
- Cerys Matthews: The Blues Show
- Paddy McGuinness
- Trevor Nelson
- Dermot O'Leary: live show and Alternative Sounds of the 90s
- Elaine Paige: Elaine Paige on Sunday
- Mark Radcliffe: The Folk Show
- Romesh Ranganathan
- Angela Scanlon
- DJ Spoony: The Good Groove
- Jeremy Vine
- Michelle Visage
- Jo Whiley
- Emma Willis

=== Stand-in presenters ===
These presenters do not have permanent slots on Radio 2 but regularly sit in for shows on the network. The list does not include regularly scheduled presenters who also stand in for other shows.

- Clara Amfo (sits in for Trevor Nelson)
- Nihal Arthanayake (sits in for Good Morning Sunday)
- Ros Atkins (sits in for Jeremy Vine)
- Angellica Bell (sits in for The Good Groove with DJ Spoony)
- Edith Bowman (sits in for Jo Whiley, Sounds of the 80s with Gary Davies and Sounds of the 90s with Fearne Cotton)
- Tina Daheley (sits in for Jeremy Vine)
- Victoria Derbyshire (sits in for Jeremy Vine)
- Joel Dommett (sits in for Vernon Kay, Dermot O'Leary, Romesh Ranganathan and Rylan on Saturday)
- Nick Grimshaw (sits in for Jo Whiley and Rylan on Saturday)
- Oliver Hides (sits in for Owain Wyn Evans)
- Alex Jones (sits in for Romesh Ranganathan and Dermot O'Leary)
- Ronan Keating (sits in for Sounds of the 90s with Fearne Cotton)
- Lorraine Kelly (sits in for Jeremy Vine)
- Jason Manford (sits in for Paddy McGuinness)
- Moby (sits in for The Blues Show with Cerys Matthews)
- Paddy O'Connell (sits in for Jeremy Vine and OJ Borg)
- Melvin Odoom (sits in for The Good Groove with DJ Spoony)
- Andi Oliver (sits in for Trevor Nelson and The Good Groove with DJ Spoony)
- Connor Phillips (sits in for OJ Borg and Richie Anderson)
- Steffan Powell (sits in for Owain Wyn Evans)
- Ellie Taylor (seasonal cover for Emma Willis)
- Josh Widdicombe (sits in for Romesh Ranganathan and Dermot O'Leary)
- Phil Williams (sits in for OJ Borg and Richie Anderson)

=== Travel presenters ===
- Sally Boazman (Weekends)
- Ellie Brennan (weekday mornings)
- Jules Wilson-Lang (stand in)
- Orna Merchant (Weekends)
- Kirsten O'Brien (Monday–Thursday afternoons, only)
- Bobbie Pryor (Friday afternoons, only)

=== Regular contributors ===
Those listed below, regularly appear on shows as contributors but don't present a programme themselves.

- Sarah Jarvis (medical expert, on Jeremy Vine's show)
- James King (film critic, on Jo Whiley's show – alternate Tuesdays)
- Martin Lewis (financial expert, on Jeremy Vine's show)
- Terry Walton (gardening contributor, "Radio 2's Official Allotment" on Jeremy Vine's show)

== Notable former presenters ==
- Paul Hollingdale (1967–1970)
- Pat Doody (1967–1971)
- Eric Robinson (1967–1971)
- Kenneth Alwyn (1967–1972)
- Barry Alldis (1967–1973)
- Simon Bates (1973–1976)
- David Gell (1967–1977)
- Robin Richmond (1969–1980)
- Bob Christie (1969–1976)
- Sam Costa (1967–1981)
- Alberto Semprini (1967–1982)
- David Symonds (1979–1982)
- Kenny Everett (1981–1983)
- Tom Edwards (1968–1984)
- Pete Murray (1967–1984)
- Tony Brandon (1970–1985)
- Steve Jones (1979–1985)
- David Hamilton (1967–1973; 1975–1986)
- Ray Moore (1967–1988)
- Stuart Hall (1982–1988)
- Peter Dickson (1983–1989 plus one week as a stand-in in 1999)
- Billy Butler (1988–1990)
- Simon Dee (1988–1989)
- Peter Clayton (1970–1991)
- Teddy Johnson (1967–1992)
- Keith Fordyce (1969–1992)
- Judith Chalmers (1990–1992)
- Graham Knight (1988–1991)
- Bill Rennells (1978–1993)
- Anne Robinson (1988–1993, stand-in for Jimmy Young 1993–1998)
- John Sachs (1991–1993)
- Barbara Sturgeon (1992–1993)
- Adrian Love (1987–1994)
- Mary Marquis (1968–1988)
- Peter Haigh (1967–1970, 1988–1995)
- Charlie Chester (1968–1995)
- Alan Dell (1967–1995)
- Gloria Hunniford (1981–1995)
- Katie Boyle (1968–1996)
- Wally Whyton (1969–1996)
- Martin Kelner (1984–1996)
- Chris Stuart (1985–1996)
- Derek Jameson (1985–1997, with wife Ellen from 1992 to 1997)
- Angela Rippon (1985–1997, stand-in presenter)
- Robbie Vincent (1997 only)
- Debbie Thrower (1995–1998)
- John Dunn (1967–1998)
- Benny Green (1967–1998)
- Bob Holness (1968–1974, 1985–1998)
- Charles Nove (1981–2012)
- David Allan (1968–1999)
- Pam Ayres (1996–1999)
- Des Lynam (1970–1980, 1998–1999)
- Jackie Bird (1998–2000)
- Alan Freeman (1997–2000)
- Cliff Adams (1967–2001)
- Jack Docherty (2000–2001)
- Katrina Leskanich (1998–2000)
- Sheila Tracy (1977–2000)
- Jimmy Young (1973–2002)
- Andy Peebles (1998–2002)
- Alan Keith (1970–2003)
- Sybil Ruscoe (2003–2004)
- Don Maclean (1990–2006)
- Brian Hayes (1991–2006)
- Sheridan Morley (1990–2006)
- Helen Mayhew (1997, 2004–2006)
- Richard Baker (1986–2007)
- Nick Barraclough (1992–2007)
- Canon Roger Royle (1984–2007)
- Russell Brand (2006–2008)
- Humphrey Lyttelton (1967–2008)
- Matthew Wright (2006–2008)
- Michael Aspel (1968–1974, 1986–1999, 2009)
- Jon Briggs (newsreader and continuity) (1996–2009)
- Mo Dutta (1995–2009)
- Bob Dylan (2007–2009)
- Malcolm Laycock (1995–2009)
- Pete Mitchell (2006–2009)
- Jonny Saunders (former drivetime and weekday breakfast sports reporter) (2006–2011)
- Emma Forbes (2009–2010)
- Sarah Kennedy (1976–1983, 1993–2010)
- Mark Lamarr (1998–2010)
- Jonathan Ross (1999–2010, 2014–2018)
- Suzi Quatro (2008–2010)
- Dale Winton (2000–2010)
- Steve Harley (2000–2008)
- Michael Parkinson (1996–2007, 2011)
- Alan Titchmarsh (2006–2011)
- Colin Berry (1973–2012)
- Melanie Sykes (2010–2012)
- Brian D'Arcy (2007–2012)
- Mike Harding (1997–2012)
- Aled Jones (2006–2012)
- David Jacobs (1967–2013)
- Steve Lamacq (2007–2013)
- Stuart Maconie (1998–2013)
- Lynn Parsons (1998–2014)
- Fran Godfrey (newsreader) (1990–2014)
- Dave Pearce (2011–2014)
- Richard Allinson (1997–2014)
- Alan Dedicoat (newsreader) (1986–2015)
- Rebecca Pike (business news reporter) (2006–2015)
- Ed Stewart (1980–1983, 1991–2006, 2007–2015)
- Terry Wogan (1972–1984, 1993–2015)
- Desmond Carrington (1981–2016)
- Janice Long (1999–2017)
- Alex Lester (1987–2017)
- Brian Matthew (1967–2017)
- Diane-Louise Jordan (2012–2017)
- Clare Balding (2013–2017)
- Lynn Bowles (travel, weekday mornings) (2000–2018)
- Paul Jones (1986–2018)
- Rachel Horne (travel, weekday mornings) (March–December 2018)
- Matt Williams (Drivetime Sport reporter) (2010–2018)
- Nigel Ogden (1980–2018)
- Frank Renton (1995–2018)
- Moira Stuart (newsreader, weekday breakfast) (2010–2018)
- Simon Mayo (2001–2018)
- Chris Evans (2005–2018)
- Vassos Alexander (Breakfast Sport reporter) (2011–2018)
- Carol Kirkwood (2012–2019) (breakfast show weather presenter)
- Don Black (2013–2020)
- Bill Kenwright (2010–2020)
- Graham Norton (2010–2020)
- Jools Holland (1999–2020)
- Clare Teal (2006–2021)
- Anneka Rice (2012–2021)
- Rangan Chatterjee (2021–2022)
- Craig Charles (2014–2022)
- Ana Matronic (2014–2022)
- Paul O'Grady (2009–2022, previously a stand in presenter, 2007–08)
- Vanessa Feltz (2011–2022)
- Janey Lee Grace (1999–2022)
- Tim Smith (1999–2022)
- Ricky Wilson (2021–2022 with a regular series, also a stand-in presenter)
- Ken Bruce (1984–2023, previously a stand in presenter, 1980–1983)
- Johnnie Walker (1998–2024, previously a stand in presenter, 1997–1998)
- Claudia Winkleman (2008–2024)
- Steve Wright (1996–2024)
- Rob Beckett (2022–2025)
- Phil Williams (2023–2025)
- Nicki Chapman (2011–2024)
- Zoe Ball (2009–2012, 2017–2025, previously a stand in presenter, 2006–09)
- Liza Tarbuck (2012–2026, previously a stand in presenter, 2007–11)
- Scott Mills (2022–2026, previously a stand in presenter, 2017–21)
- Bob Harris (1996–2026)

== Controllers/Head of Station ==
Years served	Controller
1967–1968	Robin Scott
1968–1976	Douglas Muggeridge
1976–1978	Derek Chinnery
1978–1980	Charles McLelland
1980–1984	David Hatch
1984–1990	Bryant Marriott
1990–1996	Frances Line
1996–2004	Jim Moir
2004–2008	Lesley Douglas
2009–2016	Bob Shennan
2016–2020	Lewis Carnie
2020–present	Helen Thomas

== Controversies ==
Presenter Sarah Kennedy attracted controversy before she left the station in 2010. In May 1999, she gave a "bizarre" performance while standing in for Terry Wogan, blaming the incident on a lack of sleep the previous night. Her slurred speech throughout her show on 13 August 2007 also made the headlines. She blamed a sore throat and later took a month-long break. It was later reported that Kennedy was recovering from pneumonia, and she returned to work on 10 September. In October 2007, she was reprimanded after joking that she had almost run over a black pedestrian because she could not see him in the dark. The BBC later apologised for the comment. She was also "spoken to" by BBC bosses after praising Enoch Powell during a show in July 2009, describing him as "the best prime minister this country never had".

On 16 October 2008, an episode of The Russell Brand Show, co-hosted by fellow Radio 2 presenter Jonathan Ross was recorded for transmission at a later date. The show included Russell Brand and Ross leaving four prank messages on actor Andrew Sachs' answerphone, including offensive remarks about Sachs' granddaughter and use of foul language. The programme was subsequently broadcast on 18 October – partially censored – having passed the various pre-transmission checks from the programme's editors. Initially, the programme only received a small number of complaints regarding Ross' bad language; however, the incident was reported a week later by The Mail on Sunday and a public outcry soon ensued. The case was referred to both Ofcom and the BBC Trust, and in the interim, Ross and Brand were both suspended for 12 weeks from all BBC programmes pending investigation. Soon after these announcements, Brand announced his resignation from the BBC, shortly followed by the controller at the time, Lesley Douglas. Ross was suspended from the BBC without pay for 12 weeks.

In July 2009, longtime presenter Malcolm Laycock announced his resignation live on air following a long-running dispute over the content of his show, Sunday Night at 10, and issues regarding his salary.

On 9 August 2022, Paul O'Grady quit his Sunday afternoon show after fourteen years, making public that he was not happy with a schedule change which saw Rob Beckett fill his slot for thirteen weeks before O'Grady was scheduled to come back.

Following Scott Mills' sacking in March 2026 reports emerged that the former Breakfast Show DJ is preparing to sue the BBC for wrongful dismissal.

== See also ==
- List of BBC Radio 2 timeslots and presenters
