= Elaine Paige on Sunday =

- Other names: EPOS
- Genre: Showtunes
- Running time: 90 minutes: 1:00pm – 2:30pm (2004–2009); 2 hours: 1:00pm – 3:00pm (2009–present)
- Country of origin: United Kingdom
- Language: English
- Home station: BBC Radio 2
- Hosted by: Elaine Paige
- Produced by: Malcolm Prince (2004–2010); Julie Newman (2010–2012); Jessica Rickson (2012–present)
- Recording studio: Broadcasting House, London (2004–2006, 2024–); Wogan House, London (2006–2024)
- Original release: 5 September 2004 – present
- Audio format: Stereo
- Website: Official website

Elaine Paige on Sunday (often referred to on air as EPOS) is a British radio programme broadcast on BBC Radio 2 on Sunday afternoons from 1:00pm to 3:00pm, that is hosted by the actress and singer Elaine Paige. The show launched on 5 September 2004, replacing All Time Greats hosted by Desmond Carrington (who moved to weekdays with The Music Goes Round). The launch producer was Malcolm Prince. It features music and news from stage and screen productions, as well as listener requests, on-stage mishap stories, and the occasional interview from a celebrity guest. Paige has presented a special Tony Awards show, featuring interviews and music from nominees since 2015. Elaine Paige on Sunday attracts around two million listeners a week. Since 2012, the producer has been Jessica Rickson.

== History ==
In July 2004, it was announced that Elaine Paige would be presenting a new BBC Radio 2 show on Sunday afternoons, featuring music from stage and screen productions. The show replaced All Time Greats hosted by Desmond Carrington, who moved to Tuesday evenings and later Friday evenings with The Music Goes Round. The BBC Press Office said Paige's programme would feature a weekly competition, listener requests and interviews with people who have created and starred in musicals. Of joining the BBC, Paige said "I am so excited to be joining BBC Radio 2. I'm really looking forward to this new challenge... and all without having to put on lots of make up and a hot and heavy costume!"

The idea of presenting her own radio show was proposed to Paige days after she guested on BBC Radio 2 to promote an album and ended up telling her own stories and anecdotes. The show was initially set for a trial run of six months to gauge public reaction, and it proved popular with both musical theatre fans and BBC Radio 2 listeners. Paige said that being a presenter for BBC Radio 2 was a liberating experience, adding "it was if suddenly I had found my own voice, which was a wonderful thing." In a 2016 interview with Clair Woodward of the Daily Express, Paige shared her doubts on being a radio presenter. She did not think she would be any good and compared herself to fellow presenter Michael Ball, who she said was "a very ebullient, outgoing chap." She felt her radio show gave her more confidence, as she is shy. She continued, "But in my heart of hearts, I really am, and when I was asked to do the programme 11 years ago, I thought, 'How am I going to chat and have an opinion?' but Radio 2 helped me find my own voice and helped me to discover who I really am."

Elaine Paige on Sunday began broadcasting from 5 September 2004 in a 1.00 pm to 2.30 pm slot. Her first interview for the show was with Elton John. In March 2009, the BBC announced the show would be extended by thirty minutes. The extended show began airing from 5 April with an ABBA special and featured interviews with Benny Andersson and Björn Ulvaeus.

Paige has interviewed many people from the world of musicals, films and television, including Marvin Hamlisch, Cameron Mackintosh, Tim Rice, Whoopi Goldberg, Liza Minnelli, Bette Midler and Barry Manilow. In 2009, Elaine Paige on Sunday celebrated five years on air. Paige commented "The last five years have flown by and I'd like to thank the listeners for their unstinting support." In 2011, The Stage's Matthew Hemley joined the show to discuss the latest theatre news. That same year saw Don Black and Barbara Windsor fill in for Paige, while she played Carlotta Campion in Follies in America. Paige returned in December for three festive specials.

Elaine Paige on Sunday celebrated its 10th anniversary in 2014. Since 2015, Paige has presented a special programme covering the Tony Awards from New York City, which includes highlights of the musical performances and interviews with nominees and hosts. On 20 June 2019, it was announced that Elaine Paige on Sunday would be streamed every week on Broadway.com from 23 June. On 11 April 2021, her show was cancelled for the first time due to the death of Prince Philip, Duke of Edinburgh.

Paige celebrated the show's 20th anniversary in 2024. Reflecting on how she came to present the show, she stated "I didn't know the first thing about broadcasting when they offered me a pilot. I thought, 'well, I'll give it about six months' and here we are 20 years later." The 20th anniversary show included the usual stage and screen music, with "surprises" and "a good look back." Paige felt Elaine Paige on Sunday helped make musicals "cool again" and allowed listeners, especially men, to admit that they liked them.

== Reception ==
Elaine Paige on Sunday attracts around two million listeners a week. In the last quarter of 2017, ratings for Elaine Paige on Sunday increased to 2.38 million, compared to 1.94 million in the same quarter of 2016, which was a new record for the show.

In May 2005, The Guardian's Elisabeth Mahoney gave the show an unfavourable review. She called the introduction of Paige as a "rare wrong move" on the part of Radio 2. Mahoney went on to say "But what this flat, glassy show lacks is any sense of connection with its audience and any real personality. It's a chilly, alienating listening experience, quite at odds with its snug, easy-going Sunday lunchtime slot. In 2007, Lisa Martland of The Stage said while Paige had become more relaxed and confident on the air, she had realised the music was bringing her back to show on a regular basis and not the singer's lightweight presenting style. Martland added "News snippets about forthcoming productions and interviews are included, but often these opportunities are wasted and there is a distinct lack of imagination about the whole affair."

In 2008, Miranda Sawyer from The Guardian commented that while Paige is not part of her natural Sunday afternoon listening, her interviews can be insightful. Sawyer said "as a singer herself, she commands respect from other artists and she obviously understands the workings of musical theatre." On 8 March 2010, The Daily Telegraph's Gillian Reynolds chose Elaine Paige on Sunday as one of her BBC iPlayer radio choices.
