= Gary Davies =

British radio DJ (born 1957)

- Born: 13 December 1957 (age 68); Manchester, England
- Occupations: Broadcaster; DJ
- Years active: 1979–present
- Employer: BBC
- Television: Top of the Pops
- Spouse(s): Lisa Tchenguiz (m. 1995; div. 2001) Joongjai “JJ” Bhumichitr (m. 2004)

Gary Davies (born 13 December 1957) is a British broadcaster. From 1982 to 1993, he was a disc jockey (DJ) on BBC Radio 1 and a regular presenter of Top of the Pops.

As of 2026, Davies can be heard on BBC Radio 2 presentingSounds of the 80s on Saturday nights, as well as regularly standing in for other presenters.

== Early career ==
After working in marketing for a mail order company, working for a Rawtenstall company which manufactured candlewick bathroom and bedroom soft furnishings and managing a Manchester disco, in the late 1970s, Davies was a DJ in Placemate 7 Manchester. He regularly hosted artists in Placemate 4 music rooms and began his broadcasting career at Manchester's Piccadilly Radio in 1979, before joining BBC Radio 1 in late 1982, to present a Saturday evening show from 10pm to midnight. Within weeks, he was on the roster to present Top of the Pops on BBC1 alongside his Radio 1 colleagues.

== BBC Radio 1 ==
=== The Bit in the Middle ===
In 1984, Davies took over the lunchtime show. He called it The Bit in the Middle which consisted of features, such as 'The Day-To-Day Challenge', in which the same person would go on air each weekday to answer quiz questions and try to upgrade their prize, and "Willy on the Plonker", which involved piano-playing of a hit for listeners to identify.

In 1987, he filled in for Bruno Brookes as presenter of the Sunday afternoon countdown of the Top 40 from 5 pm to 7 pm.

Davies was promoted with the catchphrase "Young, Free and Single" and a jingle "Wooh! Gary Davies".

Davies' show rarely changed until it was rebranded in 1991 as Let's Do Lunch, with new features, including "Spin & Win" (a variation on "Willy on the Plonker", with a cryptic clue replacing the piano work) and the "Classic Track" featuring a piece of classical music. Previous feature "The Sloppy Bit" (a dedication followed by love song) was unchanged but renamed "Lots of Love". He also introduced "The Non Stop Half Hour" from after the 2.30 pm news until 3 pm, which was half an hour of non-stop music.

Davies' Tuesday show would include the revelation of the new Top 40 singles chart. However, updated technology meant that the chart could be compiled much more quickly and saw the chart reveal move forward to Sundays from 4 October 1987 so Davies instead did countdowns of the UK album chart and the US chart, announcing these charts on Monday and Wednesday respectively, although the US chart that he featured was not the official Billboard one, but an airplay-only chart compiled by Radio and Records magazine.

=== Weekends ===
In March 1992, Davies moved from the lunchtime show to the weekend breakfast, keeping a selection of the features. He also started a Sunday late night slot. The "Lots of Love" feature moved to this show, with dedications being read out over the music to Dances with Wolves. During this period, he also provided holiday cover for weekday presenters, usually Steve Wright or Nicky Campbell.

=== Leaving BBC Radio 1 ===
Following the cancellation of his late-night slot by the newly-appointed controller of Radio 1, Matthew Bannister, Davies resigned from Radio 1 on 11 November 1993. His final show for the station was on 19 December 1993, with "Layla" by Derek and the Dominoes being the last record played, which was also the first song that Davies played on the station eleven years earlier.

Davies was the last Radio 1 DJ to host Top of the Pops before the show's revamp in October 1991.

== Virgin Radio ==
In January 1994, Davies moved to Virgin Radio, presenting their Sunday morning Classic Tracks slot from 10 am to 2 pm. The show later went out from 9 am to 1 pm and he remained there until early 1995.

After a brief sabbatical, Davies rejoined Virgin Radio in December 1995, taking over the Sunday late night show from 10 pm to 2 am. This gave him the chance to revive his Sunday night format. In 1997, Davies moved to an earlier slot on Sundays from 6-10pm, before moving on to present the weekday late night slot in January 1999, where he remained until December 2000.

== Century Radio ==
Davies was heard on the Real Radio and the Century Network, presenting a CD chart show every Sunday originally from 1 to 4 pm but from 2006 the show went out from 4 pm to 7 pm. However, this finished in mid-2008. Gary owns a recording and publishing company called Good Groove, where he also manages new artists. Good Groove's first publishing hit was "Black Coffee" by All Saints and Davies later went on to sign singer Corinne Bailey Rae.

== BBC Radio 2 ==
On 20 March 2017, during Sara Cox's Sounds of the 80s 24-hour Danceathon for Red Nose Day 2017, Davies was interviewed by Simon Mayo on Simon Mayo Drivetime, which led to him standing in for Cox two months later to present a special 2¾-hour edition of Sounds of the 80s on BBC Radio 2. This was his first time back on BBC Radio after 23 years away. In October 2017, January and October 2018, and October and November 2020, Davies sat in for Steve Wright's BBC Radio 2 show.

On 18 May 2018, as part of a reorganisation of the Radio 2 disc-jockey roster following changes to the station's evening line-up, Davies took over from Sara Cox as permanent host of Sounds of the 80s. He also provides holiday cover for fellow Radio 2 presenters including Sara Cox, OJ Borg, Dermot O'Leary, Vernon Kay, and Rylan Clark.

On 24 February 2023, it was announced Davies would be a temporary presenter of BBC Radio 2's mid-morning show from 6 March, following Ken Bruce's departure from the station, until the new permanent presenter Vernon Kay took over in May.

On 17 February 2024, Davies became temporary host of BBC Radio 2 show Pick of the Pops, following the death of Steve Wright. Davies hosted the programme until 29 June, with Mark Goodier taking over on 6 July.

From 25 March 2026, Davies stood in for Scott Mills on The Radio 2 Breakfast Show while allegations regarding Mills' conduct were being investigated, and continued as interim presenter of the show until 3 July after the BBC announced Mills had been sacked.

Davies continues to be in rotation for breakfast and mid mornings cover and is currently covering Drivetime, until November 2026 when Angela Scanlon will take over as permanent host.
