= Paul Hollingdale =

British radio presenter (1938–2017)

- Born: Paul Wynn; 30 March 1938; Poole, United Kingdom
- Died: 5 July 2017 (aged 79); Brighton, United Kingdom
- Occupation: Radio presenter

Paul Hollingdale (born Paul Wynn; 30 March 1938 – 5 July 2017) was a British radio presenter who presented the first programme broadcast on BBC Radio 2, The Radio 2 Breakfast Show, from 5.30am on Saturday 30 September 1967. He stayed with Radio 2 until 1970.

His broadcasting career began in the late 1950s on the British Forces Network during his service in the Royal Air Force in Germany. He was stationed at RAF Wahn which was fairly close to the British Forces Network studios in Cologne.

Hollingdale had presented a show on CNBC in the early 1960s, and may have been Britain's first ever pirate radio disc jockey.

He joined the Presentation team at the BBC, on the BBC Light Programme in 1964, introducing concerts and gramophone record shows as well as reading news bulletins. Hollingdale announced the death of Sir Winston Churchill on 24 January 1965.

Hollingdale was also the first presenter on Radio 210 in Reading, launching the station in 1976 with The Breakfast Show, which ran from 6.00 am to 10.00 am. For a spell, he also presented an evening show, between 9.00pm and midnight two days a week, giving him just six hours from the finish of one show to the start of the next.

He returned to BBC Radio 2 for a special show to mark the 40th anniversary of the station on 30 September 2007.

In 1979, he opened Blue Danube Radio, an English language station in Vienna, Austria, and contributed to the station until it closed in 2000. He later moved to Vienna, where he worked as a broadcaster and film commentator.

In September 1994, Hollingdale was part of the launch line-up of Country 1035 in London.

He died from cancer in Brighton on 5 July 2017.
