= Colin Berry =

British DJ and newsreader (1946–2025)

- Born: Colin Derrick Berry; 29 January 1946; Welwyn Garden City, Hertfordshire, England
- Died: 16 April 2025 (aged 79)
- Occupations: Radio presenter, newsreader
- Years active: 1965–2019
- Employers: Various (1965–1973); BBC Radio 2 (1973–2006); Freelance (2006–2019)

Colin Derrick Berry (29 January 1946 – 16 April 2025) was a British radio disc jockey, radio presenter and newsreader, best known for his many years at BBC Radio 2.

== Life and career ==
=== Early years ===
Berry began his radio career reading news on Radio Caroline in 1965. Before that he had performed administrative duties at Granada Television and Westward Television, and he went on to do the same at Radio Caroline. After the Marine Broadcasting Offences Act 1967 came into force, Berry worked on administrative duties for the newly opened Yorkshire Television while also being a club DJ. He moved on to work in record promotion, and then became a Saturday afternoon presenter on BBC Radio Medway. He also spent the summer of 1971 as an announcer for HTV.

Berry had a brief stint with BBC Radio 1 writing and presenting programme trails, before joining BBC Radio 2 as an announcer/presenter in 1973. He remained on the Radio 2 staff for thirty-three years, presenting Night Ride, The Late Show, Music Through Midnight, European Pop Jury, Band Parade, The Early Show, You & The Night & The Music and countless other shows and concerts. He also deputised for most of the main daytime presenters, including Terry Wogan, Jimmy Young and David Hamilton. During this lengthy period Berry presented programmes for BFBS, and also Inflight Productions for which he remained on the list of presenters.

Berry was the UK spokesman for the Eurovision Song Contest, reading out the country's voting results between 1977 and 2002, with the exceptions of 1980 and 1998 when, respectively, Ray Moore and Ken Bruce performed the role. He was also the stand-by television commentator, in case the line of Terry Wogan was lost. This never happened, though it nearly did on one occasion, just 30 seconds before the show began.

Berry also appeared on other shows including The Generation Game, Blankety Blank and Bargain Hunt.. He co-hosted one edition of Top of the Pops with Peter Powell in 1980.

=== Freelance ===
After going freelance in 2006, Berry continued reading the news on Radio 2 until September 2012, when big changes occurred resulting in the majority of Radio 2 news summaries being read by journalists. His last bulletin was at 3am on 8 September 2012. Having presented late-night Saturdays on BBC Three Counties Radio from 2004, during 2009 and 2010 Berry presented a weekly show for BBC Local Radio across the Eastern Counties – The Saturday Club: 6pm to 9pm, playing music from the 1960s and 1970s. Until 2019, he had an occasional series for BBC Three Counties Radio: A Little Light Music, along with other music shows on or around bank holidays. He was also heard periodically on The Vintage Top 40 Show on various BBC local stations at 5pm on Sundays.

Berry was the regular cover for Richard Spendlove's long-running music and phone-in show on BBC local radio in the east and south-east of England on Saturday nights for a few years until his final show on 29 April 2017.

He was represented by BigFish Media for his voiceover work.

=== Illness and death ===
Berry suffered from dementia in his later years and died from the illness on 16 April 2025, aged 79.
