= Jim Moir (broadcasting executive) =

BBC executive

James William Charles Moir CBE LVO (born 5 November 1941) is a retired British television and radio producer and executive. He was a senior BBC executive for many years until his retirement in 2003.

== Early life ==
Moir attended Gunnersbury Catholic Grammar School (now Gunnersbury Boys' School). He studied history at the University of Nottingham, where he joined the Entertainments Society (Ensoc), taking part in drama productions.

== Career ==
Moir joined the BBC in 1963, as a production assistant in light entertainment. Among the programmes he later produced were Bruce Forsyth and the Generation Game from 1971-75.

Having been BBC head of light entertainment from 1987 to 1993, Moir was appointed controller of BBC Radio 2 in 1995 and took up his post in 1996. Many assumed this would be a quiet end to his career but he turned the station from a declining backwater to the most popular in the UK, winning back many former Radio 1 listeners who had defected to commercial radio. This was achieved through broadcasters like Steve Wright, Johnnie Walker, Janice Long, Paul Gambaccini, Lynn Parsons, Bob Harris and Alan Freeman, all of whom joined Radio 2 during Moir's controllership.

Since June 2004 Moir has been a non-executive director of Celador Radio Broadcasting and advises on company licence applications. He is a Fellow of The Radio Academy.

== Personal life ==
Moir lives in Pinner, in former Middlesex.
