= Sarah Kennedy =

British TV and radio broadcaster

Sarah Kennedy MBE
- Born: 8 July 1950 (age 75); East Grinstead, Sussex, England
- Occupations: Radio and TV presenter
- Years active: 1973–2010 (retired)
- Known for: The Dawn Patrol on BBC Radio 2 (1993–2010)
- Partner: Adrian McGlynn

Sarah Mary Kennedy MBE (born 8 July 1950) is a British retired TV and radio broadcaster. She presented her daily early morning radio show, The Dawn Patrol, on BBC Radio 2 from 1993 to 2010.

In the 2005 Queen's Birthday Honours, Kennedy was appointed a Member of the Most Excellent Order of the British Empire "for services to broadcasting".

== Early life ==
Sarah Kennedy was born in Sussex. She attended Copthorne Prep School in the west of the county.

== Media career ==
Kennedy began her career with the British Forces Broadcasting Service in Singapore in 1973, before moving to BBC Radio 2 in 1976, initially as a newsreader and continuity announcer. She was on duty for the station's final closedown before it moved to 24-hour broadcasting in January 1979. She continued to present music shows on Radio 2, including holiday cover for Family Favourites until 1983, mainly appearing on String Sound, featuring the BBC Radio Orchestra. She was also president of the hospital radio station known as Radio Horton, based in the Horton Hospital, Oxfordshire.

Kennedy's first on-screen job was reading the news on Southern Television's Day by Day. She came to prominence in TV as one of the hosts of the ITV light entertainment show Game for a Laugh from 1981 to 1984. She was also one of the team involved with the short-lived BBC current affairs programme 60 Minutes, which ran from 1983 to 1984, and was the main presenter of the ITV game show Busman's Holiday for several series in the 1980s.

In 1988, she presented Living and Growing, a sex-education series for secondary school pupils produced by Grampian Television for ITV Schools. She also co-hosted The Animals Roadshow (in the late 1980s) and Animal Country (in 1991) with zoologist Desmond Morris.

Kennedy returned to Radio 2 to present the weekday early morning show The Dawn Patrol, which ran between 4 January 1993 and 13 August 2010. It was originally broadcast from 5 am to 7 am, during 1993, but moved the following year to the time-slot of 6 am to 7:30 am, where it remained until 8 January 2010. In 1995, Kennedy received a prestigious Sony Gold Radio Award. She had a regular audience of around 4.5 million listeners on Radio 2. Due to Terry Wogan's retirement from his breakfast show in December 2009, and the ambitions of his successor Chris Evans, the morning radio schedule was changed, and Kennedy's show was moved earlier to its original 5 am to 7 am slot to accommodate a longer Evans show, starting on 11 January 2010.

It was announced on 3 September 2010 that she was to leave the show. Kennedy had been absent for several weeks before this and did not return to the show, as she retired from broadcasting. Evans' show was further extended in October. The programme was presented during this time by Lynn Parsons and Aled Jones. On 17 January 2011, Vanessa Feltz took over the show's slot.

She is said to have been the first person to use the term 'white van man', in 1997. "Bunty Bagshaw" was an eccentric alter-ego she adopted.

Kennedy has also published a novel, Charlotte's Friends, as well as two collections of listeners' tales, called Terrible Twos (two editions) and Terrible Pets.

== Career incidents and controversies ==
Kennedy sometimes suffered with her health, and had to take time off work. She attracted concern after a "bizarre" performance while standing in for Terry Wogan on the Radio 2 breakfast show in 1999. This included calling Ken Bruce an "old fool" and referring to the presenter of the day's "Pause for Thought" slot as "a stupid old prune". She blamed the incident on a lack of sleep the previous night and apologised to listeners the following day. She had been due to stand in for Wogan the following week, but took time off instead, and Bruce took her place.

Her slurred speech throughout her show on 13 August 2007 gained media attention, but she blamed a sore throat. She presented the following day's show as normal, before taking a month-long break, leaving the show to be presented by colleagues Pete Mitchell, Alex Lester, Aled Jones and Richard Allinson. It was later revealed that Kennedy was recovering from pneumonia. She returned to work on 10 September 2007.

In October 2007, she was reprimanded after joking (in a segment about the importance of wearing visible clothing in winter road conditions) that she had almost run over a black pedestrian because she "couldn't see him in the dark". The BBC later apologised for the comment. She had previously opined that "black men dominate athletics because they are accustomed to being pursued by lions".

She was also "spoken to" by BBC bosses after she praised the late Conservative politician Enoch Powell during a show in July 2009, describing Powell (whose 1968 Rivers of Blood speech had attracted controversy) as "the best Prime Minister this country never had". Following her departure from BBC Radio 2, she received considerable criticism for alleged excess consumption of alcohol. She denied she had a "drink problem".

In May 2014, Kennedy was banned from driving for 22 months for drunk driving, having crashed into a stationary car. In a report, it was stated that Kennedy drank four glasses of wine over several hours to alleviate back pain, and did not realise she was over the legal limit.

== Personal life ==
Kennedy has a partner, Adrian McGlynn.
