= BBC Allied Expeditionary Forces Programme =

Former British national radio station during World War II (1944–1945)

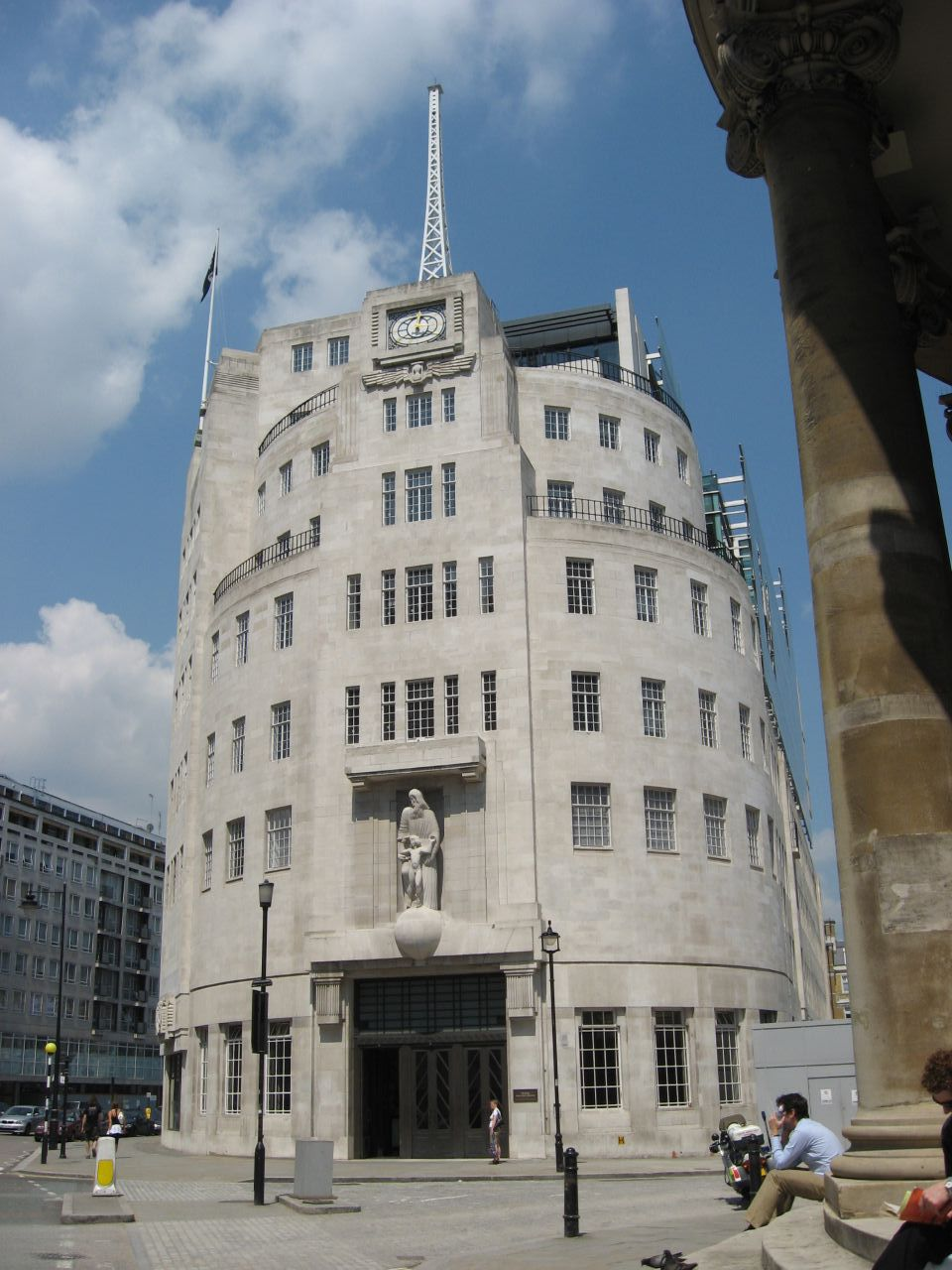
- The Allied Expeditionary Forces Programme headquarters was at Broadcasting House in London.
- Country: United Kingdom
- Headquarters: Broadcasting House, London, England
- Owner: BBC
- Established: 7 June 1944; 82 years ago
- Dissolved: 28 July 1945; 81 years ago
- Language: English
- Replaced by: BBC Light Programme

The BBC Allied Expeditionary Forces Programme was a national radio station during World War II in the mid-1940s.

== History ==
=== Overview ===
Upon the outbreak of World War II on 1 September 1939, the BBC had merged its two nationwide radio stations – the National Programme and the Regional Programme (which were begun broadcasting on 9 March 1930) – into a single BBC Home Service. On 7 January 1940, this was supplemented by a station aimed at the British Armed Forces serving at home (until Dunkirk in France and Belgium), the BBC Forces Programme.

With the arrival of troops from United States and Canada in the run-up to Normandy landings (also known as 'D-Day'), the Forces Programme was replaced by a service more tailored to new audience as the General Forces Programme, which also broadcast on shortwave for service people in the Asian theatre of operations. When Operation Overlord, the Allied invasion of occupied Europe began, it was felt by the Allied governments that a joint service of entertainment, news and information for the fighting troops would be a better use of resources than providing separate services from American Forces Network and Canadian Broadcasting Corporation stations.

This combined station, called the Allied Expeditionary Forces Programme was fully operated by the BBC on behalf of the Allied forces, began broadcasting on 7 June 1944 (shortly after 'D-Day') with 514 metres (583 kHz) providing a service dominated by cabaret and swing music.

=== Closure ===
The station closed soon after Victory in Europe Day on 28 July 1945 when the British Forces Network, AFN and CBC had established their own services in the areas each force was occupying. The following day, BBC Light Programme began.
