= Brian Hayes (broadcaster) =

British radio presenter (1937–2025)

Brian Hayes (17 December 1937 – 29 November 2025) was an Australian-British radio presenter who was known in the United Kingdom for his phone-in shows. He worked as a presenter on Capital Radio, LBC and BBC.

== Early life ==
The son of a miner, Hayes was born in Perth, Western Australia. He left school at age 15 and worked as a clerk for a mining company before obtaining a job as a newsreader for a radio station in Kalgoorlie. He subsequently worked for various stations in Perth and Western Australia, in both presenting and producing roles.

== Broadcasting career ==
Hayes moved to the UK and joined Capital Radio at its inception in 1973, first as a producer of talk programmes, and then presenting Capital Open Line, before making his name as presenter of the morning interview and phone-in show on LBC Radio from 1976 to 1990. Here he adopted an often aggressive style with callers, making it clear he did not suffer fools gladly. Though this sometimes caused irritation, it was considered a valuable asset to the station; he was once satirised in Private Eye as ‘Brian Bastard'. The programme named him one of the network's best known voices.

From 1990 onwards, Hayes appeared on various stations, including presenting the BBC Radio 2 Breakfast Show throughout 1992, which was subtitled Good Morning UK throughout his tenure. He left the show at the end of the year due to unpopularity, and he was replaced by the show's former host Terry Wogan in January 1993.

Hayes presented the weekly phone-in Hayes over Britain on BBC Radio 2 in the 1990s, winning a Gold Sony Radio Award for 'Best Phone-In', a programme on euthanasia, as well as sitting in for Jimmy Young and his successor Jeremy Vine until 2006. He worked on BBC Radio 5 Live until 2006, and BBC Radio 4, on various programmes including Not Today, Thank You. During the mid-2000s, he presented Friday nights on BBC Radio 5 Live and on Sunday nights he returned to LBC.

== Death ==
Hayes died on 29 November 2025, at the age of 87.

== In popular culture ==
Hayes is mentioned on the song "Hello" by The Beloved.

Media offices
Preceded by Derek Jameson	BBC Radio 2 Breakfast Show Presenter; 1992	Succeeded by Terry Wogan
