= Wogan House =

Building in West London

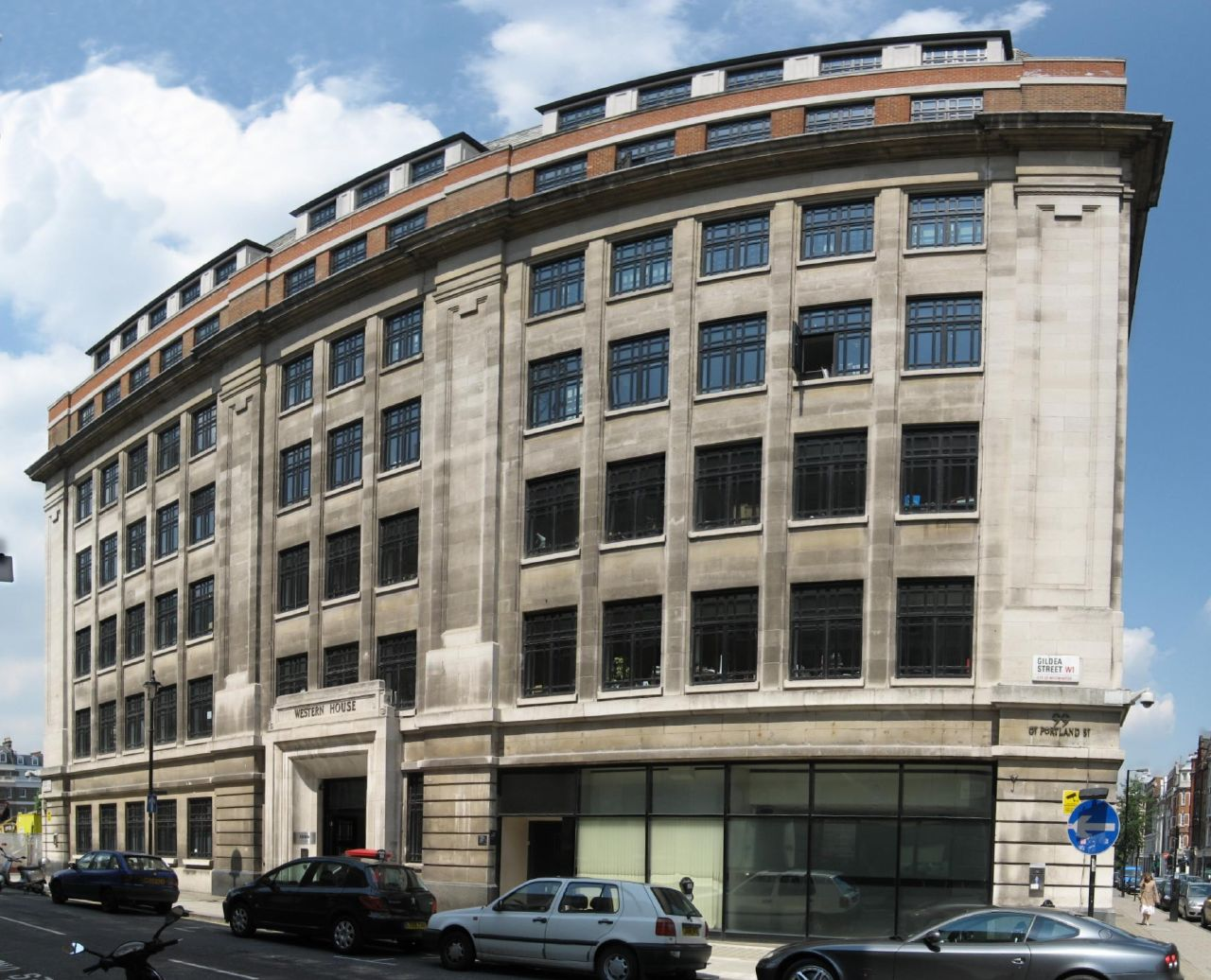
- Wogan House (then named Western House) in June 2007

- Location within Central London
- Former names: Western House

General information
- Location: 99 Great Portland Street, London, United Kingdom
- Coordinates: 51.519132°N 0.142717°W
- Named for: Sir Terry Wogan
- Owner: Aberdeen Group

Technical details
- Floor count: 7

Wogan House is an office building in central London owned by Aberdeen Group. Until 2024 the building was on long-term lease to the BBC, latterly being used to house BBC Radio 2 and BBC Radio 6 Music. It is located on the junction of Gildea Street and Great Portland Street adjacent to the BBC's headquarters, Broadcasting House. Originally named Western House, on 16 November 2016 the building was renamed Wogan House after the Irish broadcaster Sir Terry Wogan, who had died in January that year, and broadcast his final Wake up to Wogan breakfast show from the building in December 2009.

== History ==
The building has been used by the BBC since at least 1953. For a long period, the upper floors were occupied by the BBC's Engineering Designs Department, with the ground floor being occupied firstly by a car showroom and latterly being used for the BBC's Recorded Sound Effects Library. During this period, the building became the UK base for the first transatlantic colour television satellite communications. The BBC Engineering Designs Department was restructured in the late 1980s and subsequently vacated Western House in 1987.

Following extensive renovation in the early to mid-2000s, its main use from 2006 to 2024 was as the base of BBC Radio 2 and BBC Radio 6 Music, although it also housed several smaller radio studios for use by other BBC stations as well as a gym, bar and bistro for use by members of the BBC Club and guests.

On 2 November 2022, it was announced that the BBC would be moving out of the building, relocating Radio 2 and 6 Music back to BBC Broadcasting House, by spring 2024. The final 6 Music show from the building, hosted by Gideon Coe, was broadcast on 11 February 2024. The final Radio 2 show, and radio show from the building altogether, was hosted by Paul Gambaccini, on 18 February 2024. After reflecting on notable resident DJs of Wogan House, Gambaccini quoted playwright Arthur Miller: "all that's left are memories of voices in the air". The final song played for BBC Radio 2 in the studio was The Floral Dance, sung by the building's namesake, Terry Wogan.

Late in 2024, Wogan House received a new life opening up flexible office space.
