= Ken Bruce =

British DJ (born 1951)

Ken Bruce MBE
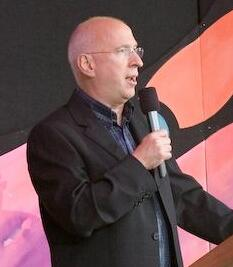
- Bruce presenting BBC Proms in the Park in 2006
- Born: Kenneth Robertson Bruce; 2 February 1951 (age 75); Giffnock, Scotland
- Years active: 1977–present
- Spouses: Fiona Fraser (m. 1976; div. 1988) Anne Gilchrist (m. 1990; div. 1995) Kerith Coldham (m. 2000)
- Children: 6
- Presenting career
- Show: Weekday mid-mornings (1986–1990, 1992–present)
- Stations: BBC Radio 2 (1984–2023, previously a stand in presenter, 1980–83); Greatest Hits Radio (2023–present)
- Time slot: 9:30 am – 11:00 am (1986–1990); 9:30 am – 11:30 am (1992–1998); 9:30 am – 12:00 pm (1998–2023); 10:00 am – 1:00 pm (2023–present)
- Country: United Kingdom

Kenneth Robertson Bruce (born 2 February 1951) is a Scottish radio and television presenter. He hosted a weekday mid-morning show on BBC Radio 2 between 1986 and 1990, then again from 1992 to 2023. Since April 2023, he has presented the same slot on Greatest Hits Radio. In the 2023 Birthday Honours, Bruce was appointed a Member of the Order of the British Empire (MBE) for services to radio, to autism awareness and to charity.

Since 2023, Bruce has presented a television adaptation of his radio quiz PopMaster titled PopMaster TV on Channel 4.

== Early life and career ==
Bruce was born and raised in Giffnock, near Glasgow, and from the age of nine, he attended Hutchesons' Boys' Grammar School before training and working as a chartered accountant for a couple of years. His next job was washing cars, following which he began his broadcasting career with the Hospital Broadcasting Service in Glasgow in the early 1970s.

In 1977, Bruce became a staff announcer for BBC Radio 4 Scotland and a TV continuity announcer for BBC One Scotland and BBC Two Scotland. Following the launch of BBC Radio Scotland in November 1978, he became one of the original presenters of Nightbeat, alongside Iain Purdon. Charles Nove subsequently joined the presentation rota. He also presented a Saturday morning show.

In 1980, Bruce took on the mid-morning slot and then, in 1983, he presented a daily afternoon entertainment show. He hosted his mid-morning show on the BBC World Service in the late 1980s.

=== BBC Radio 2 ===
==== History ====
Bruce's first broadcasts were from Scotland when he took over the presentation of Radio 2 Ballroom from Scotland after the death of Radio Scotland's announcer/presenter of Scottish Dance Music programmes, David Findlay. He presented Radio 2 Ballroom programmes regularly from November 1980 until 1982. He became a stand-in presenter on Radio 2, mainly covering for Ray Moore on the Early show. Bruce also presented shows for Radio Scotland from London. Bruce became a regular presenter for Radio 2 in January 1984 when he assumed hosting duties for the Saturday late night show in addition to his continuing show on Radio Scotland.

In January 1985, Bruce left Radio Scotland and took over from Terry Wogan on The Radio 2 Breakfast Show, being replaced himself by Derek Jameson in April 1986. He then began his first stint on the mid-morning show which lasted until the end of March 1990, when he took over the late show until the end of that year. He then hosted the early show throughout 1991, and on 6 January 1992 he returned to the mid-morning slot. While Bruce was on holiday in August 2007, Davina McCall sat in for him. This attracted more than 150 complaints from listeners.

During his show on 21 April 2008, theatre producer Bill Kenwright told Bruce that Elvis Presley visited London in 1958, and was taken on a tour of the city by Tommy Steele. The claim was disputed by Lamar Fike and Marty Lacker of the Memphis Mafia.

In December 2008, a crew of fishermen listeners were inadvertently relaying the show to every ship and coastguard station for miles around. It was not possible to contact the vessel, so a request was made to Bruce, who duly said: "If you are on a ship near the Small rocks, please turn me off." On April Fools' Day 2011, Bruce's radio show was presented by comedian Rob Brydon impersonating Bruce throughout. Brydon interviewed "Sir Terry Wogan" (impersonated by Peter Serafinowicz), and Bruce himself appeared at the end of the show as his "brother Kenn with two Ns".

As a result of restrictions imposed due to COVID-19, from 23 March 2020 to 31 May 2021, Bruce self-isolated and presented his show from home. He has spoken about remote work to the BBC website, saying: "We get a lot more people just asking for a simple hello or a mention for relatives just because they are not seeing them as much as they could. Particularly working from home, I sympathise with that, because there are lots of people I'm not seeing. We are all kind of feeling we are in this together, so it has brought broadcaster and listener rather closer together. It has made us have to be a little bit more creative with what we include in the programme. We do a lot more saying thank you to people who are keeping our essentials services going, and we are also giving people ideas of things to do while they are in lockdown". Bruce returned to broadcasting from Wogan House in June 2021.

Bruce announced on 17 January 2023 that he would be leaving BBC Radio 2 in March of that year to pursue other opportunities outside the BBC, including hosting a new mid-morning show for Greatest Hits Radio, replacing Mark Goodier (who then moved to weekends). Bruce presented his final Radio 2 show on 3 March. His final track played was "Golden Slumbers"/"Carry That Weight"/"The End" by the Beatles.

==== Programme format and features ====
Bruce's show emphasises music, and on Radio 2 he included regular live performances. Competitions have usually been music-based, with a love song and dedications feature at 10:15 am on the previous Radio 2 show. Other regular features previously included the Record of the Week and the Album of the Week and the Tracks of My Years, where a celebrity picked two songs each day for their particular meaning. The Love Song was previously played at 10:15 am each day, preceded by dedications, although a number of songs in the rotation are not romantic love songs.

The show also includes a daily quiz, PopMaster. It previously included other competitions such as Spin It to Win It and Words Don't Come Easily, although these were dropped in 2007 following the phone-in scandal. PopMaster returned in early 2008, although the other competitions did not.

The comedian and impressionist Rob Brydon, who is noted for his mimicry of Bruce, sat in for him on 25 August 2008 and again as an April fool prank in 2011 when Brydon impersonated Bruce throughout.

==== PopMaster ====
PopMaster has run as a feature of Bruce's show since 16 February 1998. With questions set by music expert Phil Swern, it offers a smart speaker for successfully completing the Three-in-Ten bonus round. If the listener fails, they are awarded a set of Bluetooth headphones (replacing the previous consolation prizes of a Bluetooth speaker, and before that an MP3 player). An earlier consolation prize, a "Space" radio, has been known to appear on eBay, to Bruce's amusement. The losing contestant is given a T-shirt with "One Year Out" printed across the front (a catchphrase Bruce uses in the quiz when a contestant trying to place the year a song was in the charts is out by one year). This consolation prize replaced a CD wallet as of 27 February 2012.

The public phone-in PopMaster quiz was suspended after airing on 18 July 2007. A celebrity version was introduced on 20 July and continued until 18 January 2008. "Three-in-Ten" was not held in the celebrity version and there was no tie breaker in the event of a draw. It was rumoured that members of the public would be able to play again before Christmas 2007 but this did not happen. Following an announcement by Bruce on 7 January 2008, the regular format returned on 21 January. The game returned with new dramatic, orchestral and guitar-based jingles.

Bruce himself was a PopMaster contestant during his show on 17 May 2013, when he took part in a special Eurovision edition of the quiz, live from Malmö, Sweden. Bruce competed against Paddy O'Connell, with John Kennedy O'Connor chairing the quiz.

=== Greatest Hits Radio ===
On 3 April 2023, Bruce began broadcasting on Greatest Hits Radio with his first song being "Come Together" by The Beatles. The show now runs weekdays 10am - 1pm and includes PopMaster at 10.30.

=== Other appearances ===
Bruce presented BBC Proms in the Park for many years. From 1988 to 2022, he was Radio 2's commentator for the Eurovision Song Contest, having taken over from fellow broadcaster and friend Ray Moore. In 1998, he shared this role with being UK spokesman for that year's contest, reading out the points for the UK telephone vote, taking it over from Colin Berry, who then returned the following year. He presented the Eurovision Song Contest Previews from 1989 to 1991 on BBC1. He was a regular presenter of the long-running Friday Night is Music Night.

He has occasionally made appearances in "Dictionary Corner" on Channel 4's Countdown, the most recent stint being during the week of 11 February 2013. When the original presenter Richard Whiteley died in 2005, Bruce said: "[he was] such a nice man – that was the defining quality of him, a genuinely nice man. And he had no real ego."

In November 2007, he appeared on a Never Mind the Buzzcocks special for Children in Need. Bruce holds a PCV (Passenger Carrying Vehicle) driving licence and is the co-owner of a number of AEC Routemaster buses with Charles Nove, Alan Dedicoat and Steve Madden. He has referred to the buses as "a fantastic piece of engineering and such fun to have". On 3 March 2008, Bruce took part in Ready, Steady, Cook, broadcast on BBC Two, with Lynn Bowles.

On 30 December 2012, Bruce won an edition of Celebrity Mastermind, with his specialist subject being the Jeeves novels of P.G. Wodehouse. In 2014, Bruce narrated the BBC One game show Reflex. He appeared in celebrity episodes of The Chase on 4 October 2014 and 12 December 2021. Bruce featured with his son Charlie on the fifth series of Big Star's Little Star and in October 2018, he made a cameo appearance on Hollyoaks.

In 2022, Bruce was interviewed for the BBC One documentary Farming England: Farming on the Spectrum – Oxfordshire, in which he spoke about Pennyhooks Farm and his then-18-year-old son Murray, who was one of several non-verbal people working on the care farm. In February 2023, Bruce appeared with Murray in the first part of a BBC Two documentary series, presented by Chris Packham, titled Inside Our Autistic Minds.

On 27 June 2023, Bruce narrated the one-off More4 documentary Sounds Like the 80s. In the spring of 2023 Bruce presented six episodes of PopMaster TV on More4 with a repeat on Channel 4. A second series began on 13 May 2024.

== Accolades and other work ==
In December 2008, Bruce was inducted into the Radio Academy Hall of Fame.

In September 2018, Bruce became the patron of Stoke Mandeville Hospital Radio, replacing former mayor of Aylesbury and long-standing patron and co-founder of the station, Freda Roberts. Bruce said: "Hospital Radio continues to thrive and I am delighted to take on the role of patron."

== Personal life ==
Bruce married Kerith Coldham in September 2000, with whom he has two sons and one daughter, he also has two sons from his first marriage and a daughter from his second. His youngest child Charlie Bruce was born in February 2008. He lives in Towersey, near Thame, Oxfordshire. One of his sons, Murray, is autistic and Bruce is an active campaigner for autism charities.

Bruce's autobiography was published on 4 September 2009, titled The Tracks of My Years: The Autobiography.

Media offices
Preceded by Terry Wogan	BBC Radio 2 Breakfast Show Presenter; 1985–1986	Succeeded by Derek Jameson
Preceded by Ray Moore	Eurovision Song Contest UK radio commentator 1988–2022	Succeeded by Paddy O'Connell (semi-finals); Scott Mills and Rylan (final)
