= Alex Lester =

British broadcaster (born 1956)

Alexander Norman Charles Lester (born 11 May 1956) is a British broadcaster. He presented the weekday overnight/early-morning programme on BBC Radio 2 from 1992 until 2014. From October 2014 until January 2017, he presented the midnight to 3 am programme every Friday, Saturday and Sunday. He also temporarily replaced Russell Brand on Saturday evenings in late 2008, between 9 and 11 pm, following Brand's resignation over his infamous prank calls row.

== Early life and career ==
Lester was born on 11 May 1956, the son of a doctor. He was educated at Denstone College, and worked in a variety of jobs (including at Dudley Zoo, in a pub, and as a civil service clerk), before he began his broadcasting career in 1977 for BBC local radio stations. He joined Radio Aire in Leeds in 1981.

Later, Lester worked for other radio stations in the commercial sector. These included Radio Tees, based in Stockton-on-Tees, where he worked from 1983 until 1986. At Radio Tees, on joining, he narrowly avoided an attempt by Canadian programme controller Donald Cline to rechristen him "Red" Lester. Lester went on to present, amongst others, the weekday lunchtime show and a specialist blues music programme there.

In 1986, Lester returned to the BBC, presenting the breakfast show (indeed, the first show) on the newly opened BBC Essex based in Chelmsford. Lester joined Radio 2 in 1987 as an announcer and newsreader. He also presented the night-time show on a rota basis. In April 1992 he was given the early-morning show permanently.

== 'The Best Time of the Day' and beyond ==
Lester kept UK truckers and other night-shift workers awake with his weird and strange observations. The meaningless but catchy show slogans are 'SCOF' (Swirling Cesspool of Filth) and 'Slap My Top' (thought to be a variation on the music hall phrase 'slap my thigh' – but reserved exclusively for people with bald heads) and listeners have marketed the show by writing the phrase in the dirt on the backs of trucks and vans. A limited-edition range of T-shirts, with the slogan written in Cantonese, was developed by a listener. Lester awarded these to people who came up with the most innovative uses of the slogan – winners included a local radio reporter who got the expression into a story; a man who wrote and recorded a song with the slogan as its title; a mystery girl, for placing an ad for Lester's show in the small ads section of a local newspaper and a man who developed a website which remains a communal meeting point for the programme's listeners, and is listed in the External links section below. As well as T-shirts, another listener produced a range of glow-in-the-dark Alex Lester wristbands, which were given away as prizes on the show. The new phrase for the 2010–2011 Truck Writing Season was 'WALLOP' (We're Alex Lester's Lovely Overnight People), and in 2013 the slogan 'ALAN' was introduced (Alex Lester at Night).

Despite being broadcast in an overnight timeslot, Lester prided himself on calling his programme 'The Best Time of the Day'. As one of the longest-serving broadcasters on the network, he was occasionally heard on Radio 2 during the daytime when regular presenters were away.

The programme was broadcast from 4 am until 6:30 am until December 1992, and from 3 am to 5 am during 1993. For 16 years, starting in January 1994, the programme began at 3 am and finished at 6 am, until it was rescheduled in 2010 after changes to the Radio 2 morning schedule. It was then broadcast from 2 am to 5 am every weekday. With the introduction of After Midnight on Radio 2 in October 2014, the show was broadcast from 12 am to 3 am from Fridays to Sundays. Alex shared the After Midnight slot with Janice Long, with Long presenting Monday - Thursday, and Lester on Friday, Saturday and Sunday. The show was cancelled in January 2017 due to Radio 2 cutting costs.

Lester had hosted a weekly show on BBC Radio Oxford from 2015 until 2017, broadcasting between 1 pm and 4 pm on Fridays.

Between February and June 2017, Lester also hosted a four-hour Sunday evening show on BBC Radio Kent but had to relinquish this due to other commitments, primarily resulting from becoming the new host of the breakfast show on BBC Radio WM from Monday 20 March 2017.

Lester could also be heard from April 2017 to June 2017 on Thames Radio's overnight shift. It is believed that the voice parts were 'Tracked' (recorded in advance and inserted between the records in real time). He also hosted the late night show on BBC across the West Midlands local radio stations until February 2020, from 10 pm on Saturday night until 1 am on Sunday.

On 4 January 2019, Lester left the breakfast show on BBC Radio WM after nearly two years of broadcasting.

From 10 February 2020, Lester began presenting the weekday overnight show on Greatest Hits Radio networks across England and Scotland from 1 am until 6 am, and from September 2020, his shows were (initially the last hour only) also heard on Greatest Hits South Wales. He also presented the Weekend Anthems show on a Saturday afternoon from 4pm until February 2022. From 8 June 2020, he permanently moved to the late night show 10 pm-1 am. From 3 January 2021, Alex moved back to 1 am-6 am, and from 8 January 2022 Alex temporarily replaced the late Janice Long on Saturday afternoons 1 pm-4 pm

== Personal life ==
Lester has homes in Hastings and Wednesbury. For nearly 10 years he lived aboard a 60-foot traditional stern canal boat (which he nicknamed The Blue Pig) during the week, while presenting his show from the BBC's Pebble Mill Studios and then The Mailbox in Birmingham. He also has a restored cottage as a third home in the Normandy region of France.

Obscure sports are another passion. Over the years, Lester has participated in Extreme Downhill Cheese Rolling, the Yorkshire Celery Wrestling Finals and achieved a 9th-place finish at the 2006 World Bog Snorkelling Championship.

In December 2010, Lester announced his engagement to his longtime partner Kerry, who is also known as "The Dark Lady". They married on 3 December 2011. Edwina Hayes, a singer-songwriter whose music had been featured on Lester's show, performed at the ceremony. Alex is a stepfather to Kerry's two adult children, Jamie and Ella, from a previous relationship.
