= Derek Jameson =

English journalist (1929–2012)

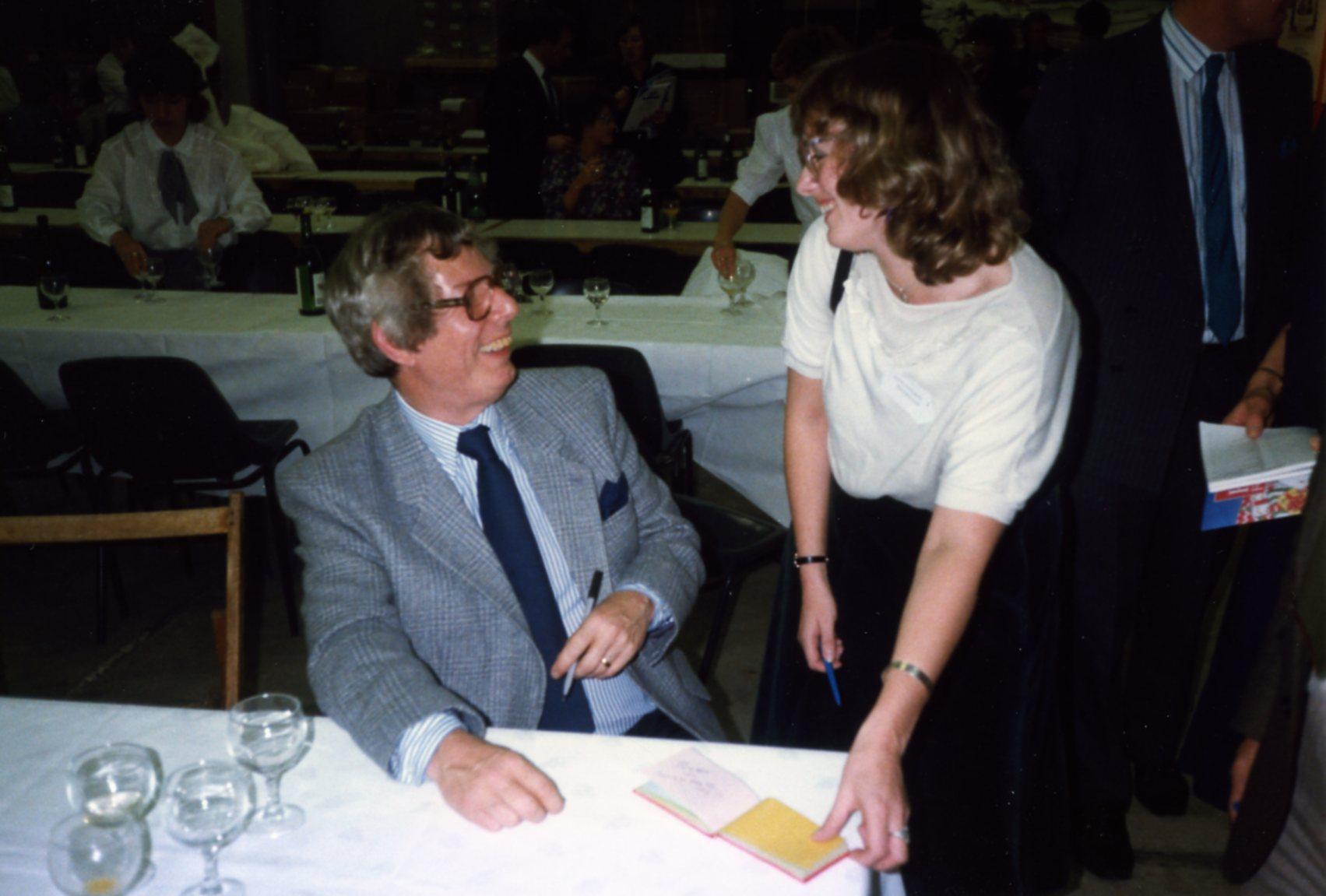
- Jameson signing an autograph
- Born: 29 November 1929; Hackney, London, England
- Died: 12 September 2012 (aged 82); Worthing, England
- Occupations: Journalist; public speaker
- Spouses: Jackie Jameson (m. 1947, divorced) Pauline Jameson (m. 1971; div. 1978) Ellen Petrie (m. 1978)
- Children: 4

Derek Jameson (29 November 1929 – 12 September 2012) was an English tabloid journalist and broadcaster. He began his career in the media in 1944 as a messenger at Reuters and worked his way up to become the editor of several British tabloid newspapers in the 1970s and 1980s.

Later, he was a regular broadcaster on BBC Radio 2 for nearly a decade and a half, including an on-air partnership with his third wife Ellen. When his profile was at its highest, he was described by Auberon Waugh as "the second most famous man in Britain after Prince Charles."

== Early life ==
Born in Hackney, London, the son of laundry worker Elsie Elaine Ruth Jameson (whom, until the age of 8, he believed to be his elder sister) and an unidentified father, Jameson was illegitimate and grew up in a private children's home alongside his mother, where conditions were poor and five children shared the same bug-ridden bed. Although Jameson never learned his father's identity, visits — at the behest of his mother — to a kosher butcher shop where the "tall blond butcher would invariably shell out a few shillings" led Jameson to assume this man to be his father.

The Palgrave Dictionary of Anglo-Jewish History (2011) states that Jameson had "one Jewish parent"; whether this refers to his mother or the man he assumed was his father is unspecified. The journalist Henry Porter, in Lies, Damned Lies and Some Exclusives (1984), states of Jameson: "Derek Jameson was born within the smell of Hackney marshes to an Irish mother and a Jewish father who disappeared shortly after he was conceived."

As a child, Jameson was evacuated from London to Bishop's Stortford, Hertfordshire, during the Second World War. His formal education included a period at a borstal; his youthful activities had included shoplifting.

== Career ==
=== Fleet Street ===
His career began in Fleet Street, as a messenger boy at Reuters, and he became a trainee reporter in 1946. That year he became a member of the Communist Party, and acquired the nickname of the "red menace" as a result. This political involvement almost ended this employment at Reuters, but his call-up for national service intervened. By the time his period in the Army ended in 1951, during which he was stationed in Vienna, he had left the Party. Jameson returned to Reuters, where he remained until 1960, eventually becoming chief sub-editor. After a brief period as the editor of the London American, a London weekly with Arthur Christiansen as the publication's consultant, he joined the Daily Express for the first time in 1961.

After working in the features department there for two years, he then became a picture editor for the Sunday Mirror. From 1965 he was assistant editor of the Daily Mirror, and from 1972 the northern editor based in Manchester. Later, in 1976 he became managing editor of the Daily Mirror and introduced the paper's own photographs of topless models. He was appointed editor of the Daily Express the following year by its new proprietor, Victor Matthews, with whom he initially had a good rapport; the two men had a similar start in life. By the time Jameson left Express Newspapers in 1980, the title had increased daily sales by 500,000, a 25% increase.

In 1978, in addition he became editor-in-chief of the group's new more downmarket tabloid, the Daily Star (with Peter Grimsditch as editor). Jameson was involved in the publicity at the time of the launch, and it was aimed at the lowest end of the market, even below The Sun. He was quoted in one newspaper as commenting that the new paper would be "tits, bums, QPR and roll your own fags", but while under oath several years later during his libel case, he insisted that this had been invented by the reporter. The Daily Star had achieved sales of a million copies each day a year after it had begun publication. By now Jameson had gained a reputation of being able to increase the circulations of tabloid newspapers, after ending his employment by Matthews over differences which had emerged. Matthews refused to return him full-time to the Daily Express, and Jameson was himself then (briefly) editing the Daily Star in Manchester.

He became editor of the News of the World in 1981. Rupert Murdoch, though, fired him in January 1984 after the publication of a story implying that Harold Holt, the Australian Prime Minister who disappeared from a beach in 1967, had been a communist spy. The Murdoch and Holt families had, in fact, known each other well.

=== Libel case ===
Jameson's cockney accent and abrasive persona caused Private Eye to coin the sobriquet Sid Yobbo in his honour, although Jameson himself protested at such caricatures. Despite his success and affluence, he remained sensitive about his origins.

In 1980 the BBC broadcast a sketch in the Radio 4 programme Week Ending which described him as an "East End boy made bad" and that Jameson was "so ignorant he thought erudite was a type of glue". Jameson sued the BBC for libel, but lost the action when it came to court in February 1984. While the jury found the broadcast defamatory, they also considered it fair comment and Jameson had to pay costs of £75,000.

This award against him affected his finances, and following the end of his time at the News of the World in the previous month, he was forced to take up an offer from the BBC itself.

=== Broadcasting ===
In 1984 he presented Do They Mean Us? a television series for BBC2 which, according to his Scotsman obituary, was "a decidedly patriotic examination of foreign television networks' British coverage". On the show, Jameson had the catchphrase; "Do they mean us? They surely do!"

He joined BBC Radio 2 in late 1985, sitting in for Jimmy Young, before taking over the breakfast show from Ken Bruce on 7 April 1986, presenting it until 20 December 1991 and greeting listeners with the refrain "morning, morning, Jameson here".

He then hosted the Monday to Thursday late-night show between 22:30 and midnight along with his wife Ellen, which was called The Jamesons from January 1992 until April 1997. In 1988, he began presenting the BBC1 television show People. He was replaced in the second series by Chris Serle, Jeni Barnett and Frank Bruno.

In 1989 and 1990, he presented the nightly chat show Jameson Tonight on Sky One from the Windmill Theatre in London.

In 2010 he took part in BBC's The Young Ones, in which six celebrities in their 70s and 80s attempt to overcome some of the problems of ageing by harking back to the 1970s.

Following the end of his regular broadcasting career, Jameson wrote a weekly column in the Brighton Argus until October 2000, and was latterly an after-dinner speaker.

== Personal life ==
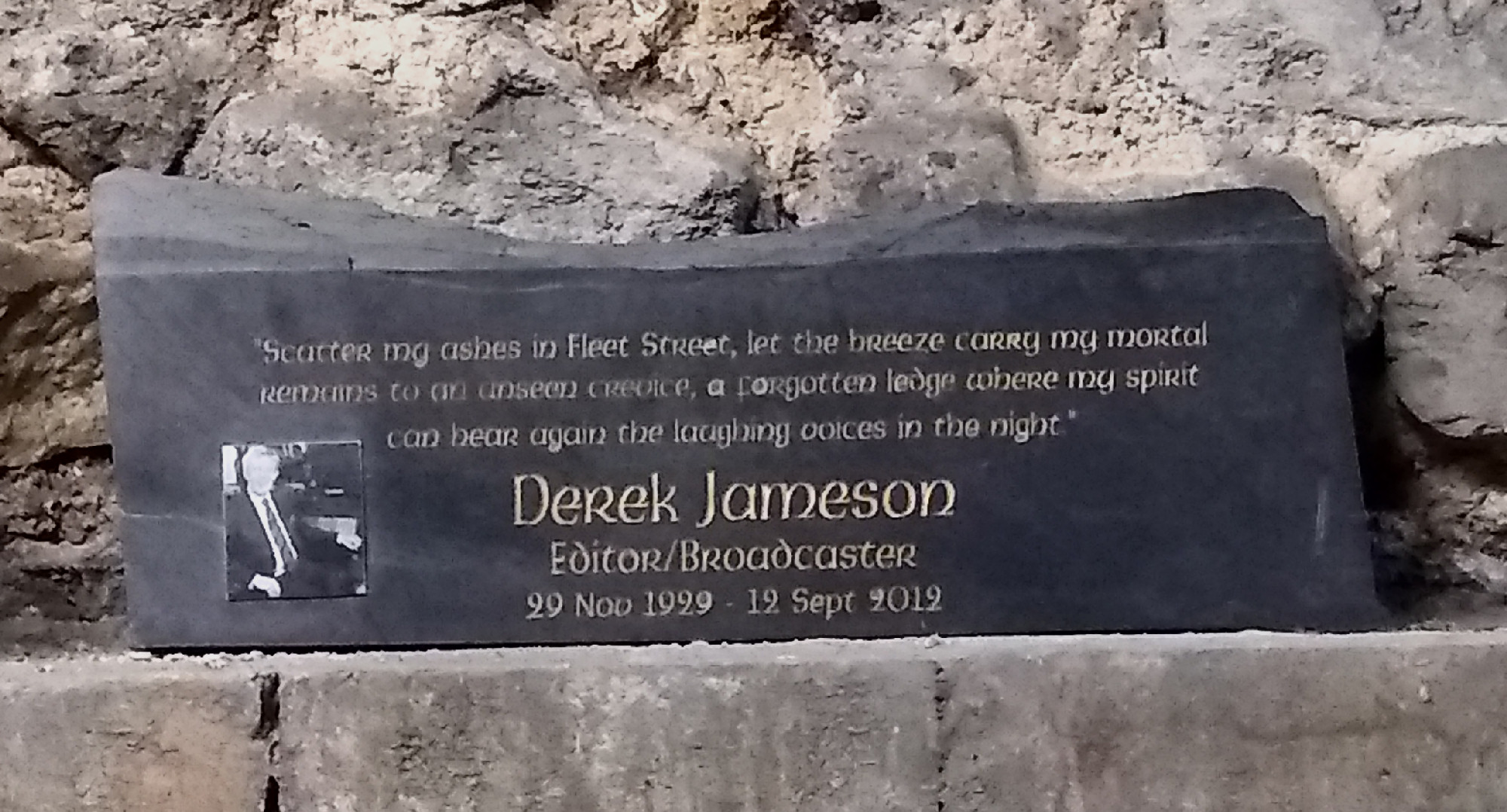
Memorial in St Bride's Church, Fleet Street

In 1947, Jameson married Jackie, whom he had met during his Communist Party membership; she divorced him in the 1960s. He married Pauline in 1971. In 1978 he left her for Ellen Petrie, to whom he remained married until his death on 12 September 2012, from heart failure, at the couple's home in Worthing, West Sussex. He had three sons and a daughter from his first two marriages.

Media offices
Preceded by Roy Wright	Editor of The Daily Express; March 1977–1980	Succeeded by Arthur Firth
Preceded by Peter Grimsditch	Editor of the Daily Star; 1978–1980	Succeeded by Lloyd Turner
Preceded by Barry Askew	Editor of the News of the World; 1981–1984	Succeeded by Nicholas Lloyd
Preceded by Ken Bruce	BBC Radio 2 Breakfast Show Presenter; 1986–1991	Succeeded by Brian Hayes
