= John Dunn (radio presenter) =

British disc jockey and radio presenter

- Born: John Churchill Dunn; 4 March 1934; Glasgow, Scotland
- Died: 27 November 2004 (aged 70); Croydon, London, England
- Other name: Long John
- Children: 2

John Churchill Dunn (4 March 1934 – 27 November 2004) was a Scottish disc jockey and radio presenter known for hosting the weekday drivetime show on BBC Radio 2 between 1976 and 1998. Dunn's career spanned more than 30 years and he was named Radio Personality of the Year three times.

== Early life ==
Dunn was born in Glasgow, Scotland.

== Career ==
Dunn began his broadcasting career when he was conscripted into the RAF. He joined the BBC External Service in 1956 as a studio manager. He then became an announcer for domestic BBC Radio in the 1960s, presenting Serenade in the Night from January 1960 and Family Favourites from April of that same year, both on the Light Programme. From May 1967 he introduced classic jazz records on Jazz at Night on the Home Service. It was Dunn who intoned "12:30 on Radio One ... the news – in English" during American DJ Emperor Rosko's first show on the first day of BBC Radio 1 on 30 September 1967.

Dunn became one of the presenters of Radio 2's Breakfast Special with the start of the new networks, and the regular presenter from January 1970, but in 1972 he effectively swapped places with Terry Wogan when the latter took over the breakfast show, whilst Dunn moved to the 3 pm to 5 pm slot The Dunn Thing. This did not last too long, and in 1974 Dunn spent a year presenting Late Night Extra. In the mid-1970s, Dunn briefly returned to his previous role as an announcer and newsreader, but he moved to his long running drive time Radio 2 programme in 1976.

After guesting on his drivetime show, writer/broadcaster Terence Pettigrew reversed their roles by inviting Dunn onto his BBC Radio 2 programme Caught in the Draft, a documentary about compulsory national service, which had originated during the Second World War and ended at the beginning of the 1960s.

From 1972 to 1975, Dunn also presented the Radio 4 children's programme 4th Dimension. This was a magazine programme comprising a mixture of documentary features, drama series and stories. In 1979, Dunn provided the British television commentary at the Eurovision Song Contest, held that year in Jerusalem. In 1996, he presented his show live from Antarctica.

He remained in the early evenings until his last show on 2 October 1998, when he announced that he was retiring and that Johnnie Walker was to be taking over the show. From then on, he continued to present documentaries for the network, as well as editions of Friday Night is Music Night.

== Awards and honours ==
In 1998, John Dunn was awarded a Gold Sony Radio Award for the best drivetime music programme.

== Personal life ==
He was married with two daughters, and lived in Croydon, London, where he died on 27 November 2004, aged 70, after a long battle with cancer.

Media offices
Preceded by Various Presenters	BBC Radio 2 Breakfast Show Presenter; 1970–1972	Succeeded by Terry Wogan
Preceded by Terry Wogan	Eurovision Song Contest UK Commentator; 1979	Succeeded by Terry Wogan
Preceded by Sam Costa	BBC Radio 2 Drivetime Show presenter 1976–1998	Succeeded by Johnnie Walker
