= Johnnie Walker (DJ) =

British radio DJ (1945–2024)

Johnnie Walker MBE
- Walker at Radio Caroline in the 1960s
- Born: Peter Waters Dingley; 30 March 1945; Hampton in Arden, Warwickshire, England
- Died: 31 December 2024 (aged 79); Shaftesbury, Dorset, England
- Occupations: Broadcaster; DJ
- Years active: 1966–2024
- Spouses: Frances Kum (m. 1971; div. 2000) Tiggy Gatfield (m. 2002)
- Children: 2

Peter Waters Dingley (30 March 1945 – 31 December 2024), known professionally as Johnnie Walker, was an English radio disc jockey and broadcaster. He began his career in 1966 on pirate radio station Swinging Radio England before joining Radio Caroline. He joined BBC Radio 1 in 1969 and BBC Radio 2 in 1998. From 2009 to 2024, he presented Sounds of the 70s on Radio 2 on Sunday afternoons and The Radio 2 Rock Show on Friday nights from 2018 to 2024.

On 6 October 2024, Walker announced his retirement from broadcasting after 58 years because of ill health, with his final show airing on 27 October. Walker's death, at the age of 79, was announced by the BBC on 31 December 2024.

== Early life ==
Walker was born Peter Waters Dingley on 30 March 1945, in Olton, Warwickshire, England. His father sold electroplating equipment for car parts at W. Canning & Co. in Birmingham, and his mother Mary Dingley was a Conservative Councillor in Solihull from 1979 to 1991. Walker was educated at two independent schools in Solihull. He attended Ruckleigh School until the age of eight and went to Solihull School, where he enjoyed music lessons and playing rugby, but failed his O-Level examinations. He worked as a garage manager's apprentice, studied for a City and Guilds qualification in motor mechanics at Gloucester Technical College, and aspired to be a car salesman, before becoming a DJ in bars and ballrooms.

== Early career ==
=== Offshore radio ===
Walker began broadcasting as a disc jockey in May 1966, on offshore ("pirate") radio station Swinging Radio England, and later on Radio Caroline. In 1967, when the Marine, &c., Broadcasting (Offences) Act 1967 forced the pirate stations to move out of British waters, three presenters continued to broadcast on Caroline until March 1968 from the coast of the Netherlands: Walker, Robbie Dale, and Ross Brown.

Walker's theme tune was Duane Eddy's 1960 hit "Because They're Young". More than 40 years later, he would use the song as the intro for his Radio 2 drivetime show.

=== BBC Radio 1 ===
Walker joined BBC Radio 1 in April 1969 and presented a two-hour Saturday show from 2 to 4 pm. A year later, in 1970, he presented a one-hour weekday morning slot from 9 to 10 am. He moved to the 1 pm – 3 pm weekday early afternoon show in 1971, which went out from noon to 2 pm in 1973. The show featured the music quiz "Pop the Question" and a Tuesday chart rundown. The new weekly chart was published from research figures provided by the British Market Research Bureau (BMRB).

== United States ==
In July 1976, Walker had a dispute with BBC management concerning the music he played, which it was said did not fit into the station's daytime music line-up. He was also reprimanded for criticising on-air "Give a Little Love" by the Bay City Rollers, then at the height of their popularity, describing them as "musical garbage". He left Radio 1 and moved to the United States, where he stayed for five years. During this time, he worked for radio stations KSAN in San Francisco, KPFA in Berkeley, California, in January 1981, and WHFS in Bethesda, Maryland. He also recorded some shows for Radio Luxembourg, until he taped a record at the wrong speed while partying in the studio.

== Return to UK ==
=== Local radio ===
Walker returned to the UK in the early 1980s and in 1982 presented Radio West's evening show The Modern World. In September 1983, he joined Wiltshire Radio, presenting the 11 am – 2 pm slot. He was subsequently heard on GWR, which was formed from the merger of Radio West and Wiltshire Radio.

=== Return to Radio 1 ===
On 17 January 1987, Walker re-joined Radio 1, presenting the Saturday afternoon show The Stereo Sequence (so named because at that time, Radios 1 and 2 shared the same FM frequencies, with much of Radio 1's output transmitted only on medium wave when Radio 2 was occupying the FM frequency). The show was later renamed The Saturday Sequence when Radio 1 began regular FM broadcasting in the late 1980s. The shows ran from 2 pm to 7:30 pm before Roger Scott took over in mid-1988. In July 1988, Walker was briefly heard on Richard Branson's syndicated service The Superstation, which provided overnight programming to some ILR stations.

=== BBC GLR and BBC Radio 5 ===
In October 1988, Walker was one of the original presenters on the new BBC local station in London, BBC GLR. He was part of a lineup that included Nick Abbot, Emma Freud, Tommy Vance and Dave Pearce. The station was run by future Radio 1 controller Matthew Bannister. Walker presented a weekday slot from noon to 3 pm, and after a few months he took over a 10am-1pm morning slot from Emma Freud.

In 1990, Walker joined newly-launched BBC Radio 5, presenting This Family Business three days a week on Mondays, Wednesdays and Fridays from 11 am to 12.30 pm. He took over the weekday show on BBC GLR from 7 pm to 9 pm, where he remained until later that year, when he was dismissed from the station by Matthew Bannister after commenting that people would be "dancing in the streets" following the resignation of Margaret Thatcher as prime minister.

Following his dismissal from BBC GLR, Walker presented the BBC Radio 5 show five days a week. His show was expanded to 9:30 am – noon, Mondays to Fridays, and was rebranded as The AM Alternative. He remained with Radio 5 until March 1994 when the station re-launched as BBC Radio 5 Live.

== Return to Radio 1 ==
In September 1991, still a presenter for Radio 5, Walker returned to Radio 1 and took over from Richard Skinner in The Saturday Sequence on Saturdays from 3 pm to 7 pm. From March 1992 the show was broadcast from 3 pm to 6 pm. He continued until October 1993, moving to Saturday's 7 pm – 11 pm slot, before moving back to Saturday afternoons from 2 to 5 pm in November 1994, where he remained until he left Radio 1 in October 1995.

In early 1996, Walker joined London talk station LBC, presenting the weekend programme from 6 to 10 am. He was also heard on Classic Gold stations around the UK on Saturdays from noon to 2 pm.

== BBC Radio 2 ==
In 1997, in addition to his Classic Gold shows, Walker presented documentaries on BBC Radio 2 and filled in for other presenters.

In April 1998, Walker was given his own weekly show on Radio 2 on Saturdays from 3:30 to 5:30 pm. Six months later he took over from John Dunn and presented a show 5 pm to 7 pm Monday to Thursday, with Des Lynam presenting Friday's edition.

In early 1999, Walker's show was temporarily suspended after he became the subject of a tabloid exposé concerning his cocaine use. He was temporarily suspended by the BBC when the drug allegations were published in the News of the World in April 1999 and was subsequently fined £2,000 for possession of cocaine. During Walker's absence, Richard Allinson filled in for him on Drivetime and Billy Bragg took over Saturday afternoons. Walker returned to his drivetime show, now presented from Monday to Friday, towards the end of 1999. Janice Long took over the Saturday afternoon shows.

=== Illness announced ===
Walker told listeners in June 2003 that he was suffering from cancer. He ended his show by stating that he was beginning treatment and would be taking time off to recover, and played "Bridge over Troubled Water" by Simon & Garfunkel. Stuart Maconie filled in for him in his absence. On 24 July 2003, the BBC announced that Noel Edmonds would join Radio 2 to present Drivetime for eight weeks. Edmonds took over from 4 August until 3 October. Walker's recovery continued but he was not able to return and Stuart Maconie continued as stand-in. At the beginning of 6 October's Drivetime show, Maconie played Bruce Springsteen's "Born to Run" for Walker, said he was "doing well", and that he was due to return at the end of the year.

Walker returned to the show on 1 March 2004: his first record was Eric Clapton's "Hello Old Friend". Walker and Clapton were born on the same day, and Walker later presented a Radio 2 show to celebrate the fact that they were both turning sixty.

He was appointed an MBE in the 2006 New Year Honours.

== New projects ==
In February 2006, it was announced that Walker was to retire as host of Radio 2 Drivetime and take over from Ed Stewart on Sunday afternoons 5–7 pm. Here he would conduct interviews with musicians. His last Drivetime show was on 31 March 2006, with Neil Diamond as a guest. The final song played by Walker on his show was "Human Touch" by Bruce Springsteen. He took over the Sunday afternoon programme in April 2006 and continued to deputise for Terry Wogan on the Breakfast show.

== 2007 to 2024 ==
From 28 January 2007, Walker's Sunday show was moved to 4:30-6:30 pm. He continued to deputise for Terry Wogan on Radio 2's Breakfast Show until the end of 2009. His autobiography was published on 31 May 2007. A book published in 2006, Johnnie Walker – Cruisin' The Formats, described his radio work over forty years.

From 9 to 14 August 2007, Walker was one of several former pirate radio disc jockeys who appeared in BBC Essex's six-day revival of pirate radio to commemorate the 40th anniversary of the Marine, &c., Broadcasting (Offences) Act 1967 which closed down the pirate stations. At Easter 2009 he was also part of "Pirate BBC Essex" programmes to celebrate 45 years since the launch of Radio Caroline.

On Saturday 7 February 2009, Walker began a new ten-week series called Pirate Johnnie Walker on BBC Radio 2. This show recreated the sounds of pirate radio from the 1960s and included other Pirate DJs from the era as guests.

On 5 April 2009, Walker took over a Sunday afternoon (3 – 5 pm) show on Radio 2 called Sounds of the 70s. The show had previously been presented by Steve Harley, who broadcast his final show on Thursday 27 March 2008. The revised format featured interviews with guest artists.

In January 2019, it was announced that Walker would be absent from The Rock Show and Sounds of the 70s "for a number of weeks", to receive treatment for a heart condition.

From March 2020, Walker broadcast from his home in Shaftesbury, Dorset, with contributions from his wife Tiggy. The couple also collaborated on a podcast called Consciously Coupling. On 14 August 2022, Walker hosted a show on Boom Radio as part of the station's celebration of Offshore Radio. (The Marine, &c., Broadcasting (Offences) Act had come into force at midnight on that date in 1967, outlawing the pirates.)

On 6 October 2024, Walker announced that in the light of his health issues, he had decided to bring his career to a close after 58 years, and that his last show would be on 27 October. Rod Stewart sent an audio message saying: "I have to thank you my man, thank you from the bottom of my heart for playing not only my songs, but the Faces and just about every other rock band in the world on your wonderful show over the years." The last record he played was Judy Collins' 1970 version of "Amazing Grace". He was replaced on Sounds of the 70s by Bob Harris. His last episode of The Rock Show aired on Friday 25 October, with Walker choosing Bruce Springsteen as his Rock God. That show has been taken over by Shaun Keaveny.

Later on 27 October, Radio Caroline's Ray Clark broadcast a 20-minute interview with Walker, in which he reminisced about his early days with pirate radio and his subsequent career.

== Other work ==
Walker and his wife Tiggy both cared for one another through serious illness and were patrons of Carers UK. After having been diagnosed herself with breast cancer in 2013, in September 2015 Tiggy published a book, Unplanned Journey, a photographic journal charting her experience of cancer diagnosis and treatment. All royalties from the book are donated to Carers UK.

== Personal life ==
Walker married Frances Kum in 1971. The marriage ended in divorce. The couple had a daughter and a son. Walker married Tiggy Gatfield in December 2002.

In 2003, Walker received the BASCA Gold Badge Award for "individuals who make outstanding contributions to Britain's music and entertainment industry", sponsored annually by PRS for Music. In 2014 Walker and his wife became patrons of Carers UK.

After being diagnosed with idiopathic pulmonary fibrosis, an inflammation of the lungs, Walker presented his radio shows from his home in Dorset. He was cared for full-time by his wife from January 2024. In June, it was announced that he was terminally ill. On 6 October 2024, Walker announced during his weekly Sounds of the 70s show that he was planning to retire and that his last show would be on 27 October. His replacement was named as Bob Harris.

== Death and tributes ==
Walker died on 31 December 2024, at the age of 79. His death was announced on air on BBC Radio 2 by Bob Harris at the start of his New Year's Eve Sounds of the 70s afternoon show.

Helen Thomas, head of Radio 2, said: "Everyone at Radio 2 is heartbroken about the passing of Johnnie, a much loved broadcasting legend." BBC director general Tim Davie described Walker as a "pop radio pioneer and champion of great music", adding: "No-one loved the audience as much as Johnnie, and we loved him back."

Walker's widow Tiggy said that she "couldn't be more proud" of how Johnnie kept broadcasting until shortly before his death. "He remained his charming, humorous self to the end, what a strong amazing man. It has been a rollercoaster ride from start to finish," she commented, and added: "And if I may say – what a day to go. He'll be celebrating New Year's Eve with a stash of great musicians in heaven. One year on from his last live show. God bless that extraordinary husband of mine who is now in a place of peace."

== Works ==
- Walker, Johnnie (2008). The Autobiography. Penguin. ISBN 978-0141024288. OCLC 212431008.

Media offices
Preceded by John Dunn	BBC Radio 2 Drivetime Show presenter 1998–2006	Succeeded by Chris Evans
