= Ray Moore (broadcaster) =

British broadcaster (1942–1989)

- Born: William Raymond Moore; 2 January 1942; Liverpool, England
- Died: 11 January 1989 (aged 47)
- Occupation: Broadcaster
- Years active: 1962–1988
- Spouse: Alma Mather (m. 1969)

William Raymond Moore (2 January 1942 – 11 January 1989) was a British broadcaster, best known for hosting the early morning show on BBC Radio 2 between 1982 and 1988.

== Early life ==
Born in Liverpool, he attended Waterloo Grammar School, and harboured ambitions to be a BBC announcer from an early age. On leaving school, his first job was at Liverpool docks, and he was subsequently a technician and actor with repertory companies in Oldham, Sidmouth and Swansea.

== Broadcasting career ==
He started broadcasting in 1962 as a continuity announcer with Granada Television, later moving to ATV in Birmingham and eventually the BBC in Manchester and London. In his autobiography, written after his cancer diagnosis (for which he refused radical treatment), he said that he strove for years to lose his Liverpool accent so that he could work for the BBC, but by the time he got a job there it no longer mattered. At the BBC he worked on the BBC Light Programme and later BBC Radio 2 as an announcer on radio and television, providing voice-overs for a number of popular shows such as Come Dancing, Miss World and the radio commentary for the Eurovision Song Contest, also presenting the Eurovision Song Contest Previews in 1987.

From 1982, until his last show on 28 January 1988, he hosted the early morning show on BBC Radio 2, developing an idiosyncratic broadcasting style which relied on a highly individual, gentle and sophisticated wit and repartee. As he explained in his autobiography:

My theory, if I ever had one, was that this show, broadcast at such a crazy time, could only be successful if it were based on one assumption: that nobody in his or her right mind would choose to be up at such an awful hour. If we both had to be awake so early, I thought, let's agree one thing: that it's you and me against the world. I determined to be cheerful but in a grumpy sort of way, with none of the enforced jollity so beloved of BBC Radio 4.

The regular exchange of banter established between Moore and Terry Wogan as the former handed over to the latter's breakfast show at 7:30am became an established element of Radio 2's morning schedule, until Wogan left the breakfast show in 1984 to present his television chat show.

Moore's show brought him a dedicated following of listeners, evidenced in 1986 and 1987 by the turn-out of thousands of early-morning joggers for the two 'Bog-eyed Jog' events held in sporting stadia across the UK in aid of Children in Need. In association with these events, he released two records: "O' My Father Had A Rabbit" spent seven weeks in the UK Singles Chart in 1986, reaching number 24 – out-performing, as Moore loved to point out, "Only Love Remains" by Paul McCartney; while the follow-up, "Bog-Eyed Jog", did not do so well, peaking at number 61.

== Personal life and death ==
Moore married Alma Mather in 1969, and referred to her on air as management. A heavy smoker, Moore was diagnosed with throat cancer in 1987, and he died on the night of 11 January 1989, nine days after his 47th birthday.

In 1989, he posthumously won the Outstanding Personal Contribution to Radio award from the Broadcasting Press Guild.
