= Daydreamer =

A daydreamer is someone who daydreams.

Daydreamer may also refer to:

== Songs ==
- "Daydreamer" (David Cassidy song), 1973
- "Daydreamer" (Flux Pavilion song), 2012
- "Daydreamer", a song by Adele from 19
- "Daydreamer", a song by Menswear from Nuisance, 1995
- "11:00 AM (Daydreamer)", a song by 10 Years from Division
- "Daydreamer", a song by Aurora from A Different Kind of Human (Step 2)

== Albums ==
- The Daydreamer (soundtrack), a soundtrack album from the 1966 film (see below)
- Daydreamer, a 2014 album by Harts
- Daydreamer, a 2011 mixtape by Kid Ink
- The Daydreamer, a 1966 album by Burl Ives

== Other uses ==
- The Daydreamer (film), a 1966 Rankin/Bass film
- The Daydreamer (1970 film), or Le Distrait, a French comedy directed by Pierre Richard
- Daydreamer, a 2007 film starring Aaron Paul and Arielle Kebbel
- The Daydreamer (novel), 1994 novel by Ian McEwan
- Daydreamer (video game), a 2015 video game
- "Daydreamer" (The Chief), a 1990 television episode
- DAYDREAMER, a computer program modelling the human stream of thoughts
- Daydreamer (film), a 2024 film by Sam Sprague
- Daydreamers, a 1997 Marvel Comics miniseries and titular team featuring Franklin Richards and Leech, among others

== See also ==
- Daydream (disambiguation)
- Daydreaming (disambiguation)
- "Runaway Daydreamer", a song by the English recording artist Sophie Ellis-Bextor for her fifth studio album Wanderlust (2014)
