= Shaun Keaveny =

English broadcaster (born 1972)

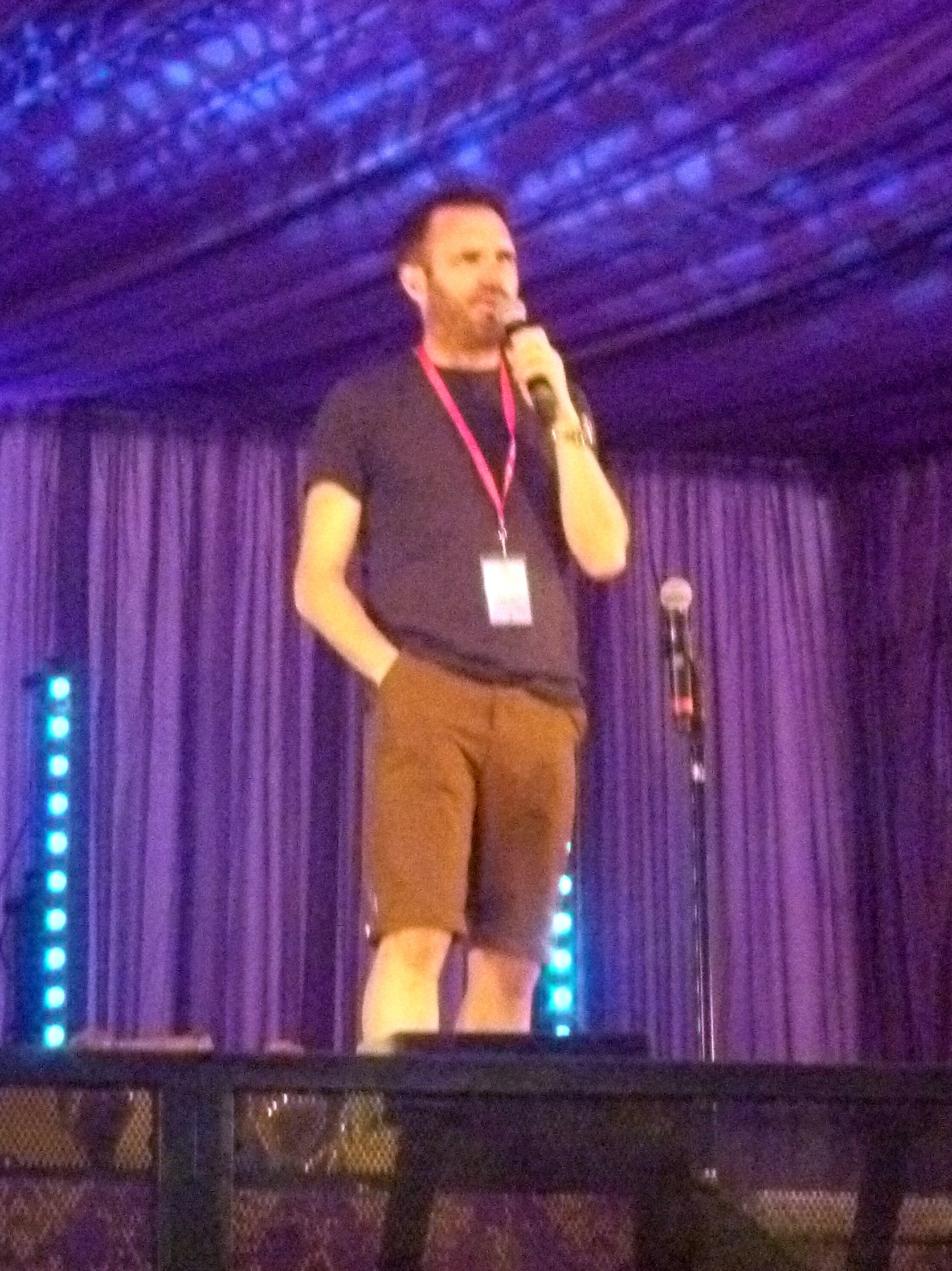
- Keaveny at the Latitude Festival, 2013
- Born: Shaun William Keaveny; 14 June 1972 (age 54); Leigh, Lancashire, England
- Education: St Mary's Catholic High School, Astley
- Alma mater: Trinity and All Saints College
- Occupations: Radio presenter Comedian; Magician; Musician (drums)
- Known for: BBC Radio 6 Music; BBC Radio 2

Shaun William Keaveny (born 14 June 1972) is a British broadcaster, known for presenting BBC Radio 6 Music's breakfast show from 2007 to 2018, and the afternoon show from 2019 to 2021. He currently presents BBC Radio 2's Rock Show and Sounds of the 70s on Sunday afternoons. He is also the creator of Community Garden Radio.

== Early life and education ==
Keaveny grew up on the Higher Folds housing estate in Leigh, Lancashire. He attended St Mary's Catholic High School, Astley and then Trinity and All Saints College in Leeds.

== Career ==
Keaveny started his radio career at 2-Ten-FM, then Beacon FM before joining XFM London presenting the weekday afternoon show (Monday-Thursday) and the Friday breakfast show until the end of 2006.

In January 2007 Keaveny joined BBC Radio 6 Music initially presenting its late evening show, before moving to the BBC 6 Music Breakfast Show on 2 April 2007. He took over from Phill Jupitus, who had hosted the Breakfast slot since the station's inception in March 2002. The show had regular music news updates from presenter Matt Everitt and Georgie Rogers. Brian Cox was a regular contributor to the show.

Keaveny's first book, R2D2 lives in Preston was published in November 2010. It is a compilation of little known facts relating to various towns throughout the United Kingdom, advised by listeners to his radio show in a feature entitled Toast the Nation.

On 16 February 2013, Keaveny took part in the fifth series of Let's Dance for Comic Relief as a member of Destiny's Dad alongside fellow stand-up comedians Hal Cruttenden and Mark Dolan.

It was announced in August 2018 that Keaveny would move from his weekday BBC 6 Music breakfast show, to the Radcliffe and Maconie weekday afternoon slot in January 2019. Keaveny hosted his final Breakfast Show live from the Maida Vale Studios on 14 December 2018 as part of the BBC 6 Music All Day Christmas Party.

The Channel 5 series The Mega Council Estate Nextdoor aired in September 2020 was narrated by Keaveny.

In June 2021, he announced that he would be leaving 6 Music in September 2021 after 14 years at the station saying "Things change, places change, people change, and it's time for a change."

His final 6 Music show was on 10 September 2021.

After leaving BBC 6 Music he set up Community Garden Radio, an internet service which sees Keaveny broadcast a live show every Wednesday, and started a podcast called Creative Cul De Sac about people's unrealised ideas, as well as hosting The Line-Up, discussing guests' dream festivals.

From April 2022 to June 2024 Keaveny presented the BBC Radio 4 show Your Place or Mine with Shaun Keaveny, on Saturday mornings where, with a co-presenter, guests from around the world try to convince him to visit the places they come from.

Keaveny provided cover for several shows on BBC Radio 2, including Mark Radcliffe’s Folk Show for 10 weeks in early 2024 while Radcliffe took a break and Rob Beckett’s Sunday evening show for two weeks in October and November 2024.

He took over presenting the Friday night Rock Show from Johnnie Walker on 1 November 2024.

He also covered the Saturday teatime programme presented by Liza Tarbuck in August 2021, March 2022, October 2024, and from January to March 2026, before taking over the Saturday teatime slot on an interim basis from April to June 2026 after Tarbuck announced that she would not be returning.

In March 2026, Keaveny started covering Sounds of the 70s whilst regular presenter Bob Harris was taking treatment for prostate cancer, and permanently took over from 7 June 2026 after Harris announced his retirement from broadcasting.

== Personal life ==
Keaveny is married, and a father to two sons and a daughter.
