= Jodie Cook =

British entrepreneur and author

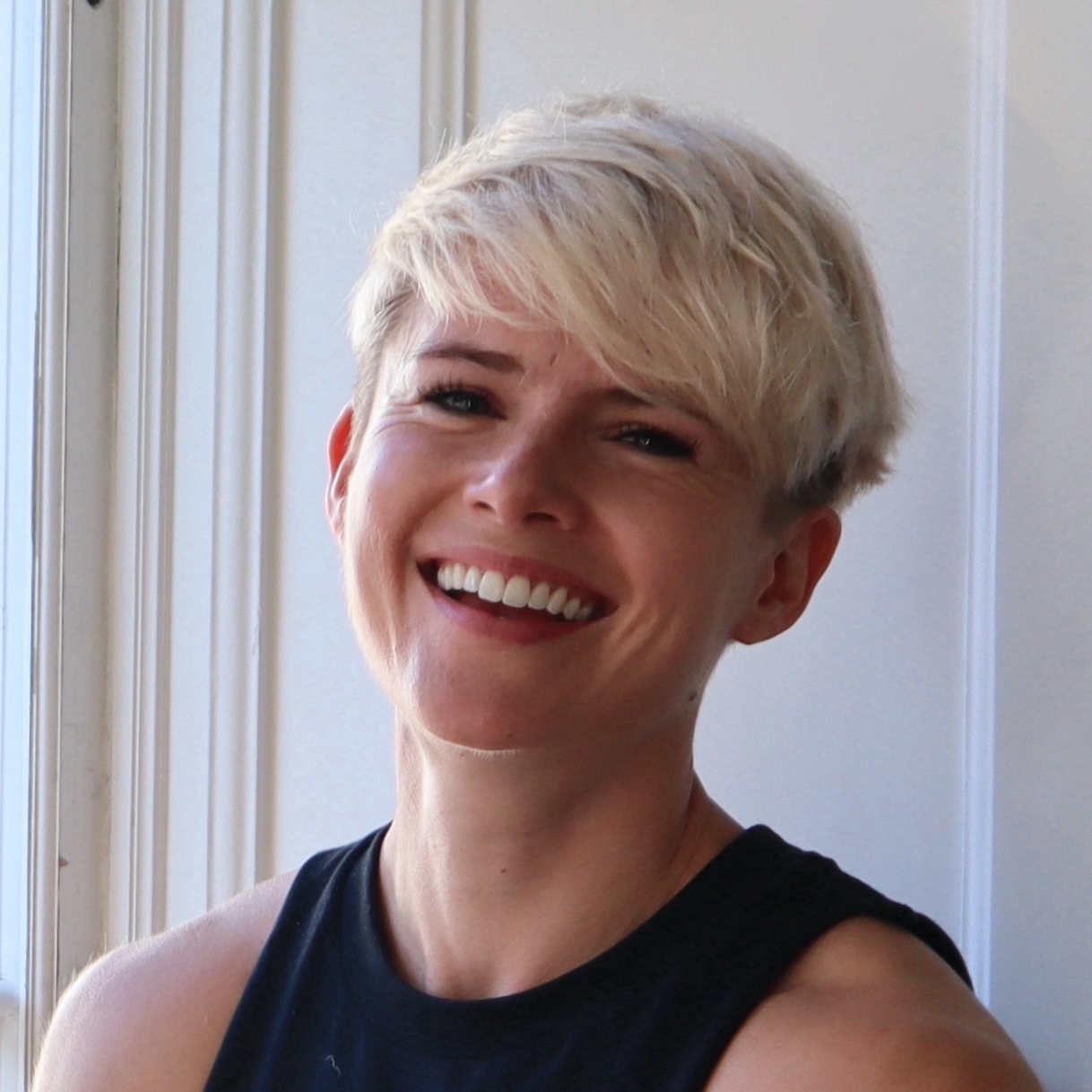
- Cook in 2022
- Born: Jodie Elizabeth Cole; Birmingham, West Midlands, England
- Occupations: Entrepreneur; author

Jodie Cook is a British entrepreneur and author from Birmingham, UK. Cook featured in Forbes’ Europe's 30 Under 30 list of social entrepreneurs in 2017. She is an international powerlifter for Great Britain.

== Early life and education ==
Cook was born and raised in Birmingham, England. Cook then attended King Edwards VI Five Ways School in Bartley Green, achieving 10 A grades at GCSE, before studying Business Management at the University of Sheffield.

== Career ==
=== JC Social Media ===
Jodie Cook founded JC Social Media, a specialist social media agency, in 2011 the day after completing a year in the National Skills Academy for Social Care graduate scheme. Cook was selected as one of the original twelve ambassadors of the Start-up Loans scheme, as an example of someone who started their business with less than £1000.

In 2016, JC Social Media was shortlisted for a national award for its work with Subaru UK. In November 2017, JC Social Media won the national Chamber of Commerce's "Best use of Social Media" award. Cook also published several books on social media management for business.

In 2021, JC Social Media was acquired by Low&Behold, a marketing agency group.

=== Clever Tykes ===
In 2013, Cook co-founded and co-wrote Clever Tykes, a series of children's storybooks written to inspire enterprising behaviour in primary school children. Cook was invited to discuss the project with the Prime Minister's enterprise advisor Lord Young, and the project was included in a national government report entitled "Enterprise for All" after receiving his endorsement.

In January 2016, support from Lloyds Banking Group enabled the distribution of 24,000 sets of Clever Tykes books to primary schools across the UK.

=== Writing and podcasts ===
In May 2017, Cook recorded her TEDx talk "Creating Useful People" at TEDx Aston University. She delivered the opening keynote at the 2018 NACUE Student Enterprise Conference.

In 2017, Cook was a guest on the BBC Radio 4 programme, "Being bored: the importance of doing nothing" hosted by Phill Jupitus, where she suggested that he solved his problem of never being bored by scheduling boredom in his diary. In 2018 Cook interviewed Jupitus for the Clever Tykes podcast: Creating Useful People, which explores the childhood influences that shape future success. Other guests interviewed on the podcast are Jordan Daykin, Emma Jones MBE, Craig Donaldson, Jessica Ward, and Sara Davies MBE.

In 2018, Cook became a contributing writer for Forbes, on the topic of entrepreneurship.

In 2019, Cook released the book Stop Acting Like You're Going To Live Forever, a collection of 36 articles on the topics of entrepreneurship, happiness and lifestyle design, and its accompanying guided journal.

In 2020, Cook released the book How To Raise Entrepreneurial Kids, published by Rethink Press, and accompanying playbook, with entrepreneur Daniel Priestley. The book has been translated into seven languages, Korean, Chinese (simplified), Vietnamese, Czech, Thai, Turkish and Russian.

In 2021, Cook released the book Instagram Rules, published by White Lion Publishing, an imprint of Quarto.

In 2022, Cook released the book Ten Year Career: Reimagine business, design your life, fast track your freedom, published by John Murray Publishing, an imprint of Hachette.

In 2023 Cook became a senior contributor for Forbes and was interviewed by YouTuber Ali Abdaal for his Deep Dive podcast in an episode titled "Stop wasting your life: a guide to unlocking your full potential."

=== Coachvox AI ===
In 2023 Cook cofounded Coachvox AI, a company that creates AI coaches.

In February 2025 Jodie was ranked number 8 in a list of AI experts in the UK according to a report by Favikon.

== Awards ==
In May 2014, Cook won the title Birmingham Young Professional of the Year (BYPY) at an event at the International Convention Centre having won the marketing and communications category. Later that year, JC Social Media was awarded best small business at the Midlands' Venus awards, also held at the ICC.

The following year Cook was named the Birmingham Chamber of Commerce's ‘Future Face’ of digital, whilst Cook was also listed in the Drum's 50 under 30 women in tech.

Cook was named a 'rising star' in Computer Weekly's 50 Women in Tech in 2015 and named as one of Birmingham's most influential people in the Birmingham Post's Power 250.

Cook, alongside her husband won the regional and national NatWest Great British Entrepreneur Award with the title Entrepreneurs' Champion.

In May 2021 Instagram Rules won Sales & Marketing book of the year at the Business Book Awards.

== Powerlifting ==
Cook is a competitive powerlifter, and competed for Great Britain in the 2018 IPF World Championships in Calgary, Canada, in the open 57 kg weight class category. She competed for England in the 2019 Commonwealth Powerlifting Championships, winning the silver medal in the open 57 kg weight class category.

Cook won the 2021 English Championships in the 57 kg weight class category with a 137.5 kg squat, 92.5 kg bench press and 180 kg deadlift. She won the bronze medal in the 57 kg category of the British Championships two weeks later and was subsequently selected to represent Great Britain in the European Championships in Västerås, Sweden, in December. Here she placed 4th in the 57 kg weight category, winning the silver medal in the deadlift and setting a squat personal best of 140 kg. In 2021 she was ranked 14th best female powerlifter in the United Kingdom across all weight categories.

Cook won the 2022 English Championships in the 57 kg weight class category and was subsequently invited to compete at the 2022 Commonwealth Powerlifting Championships in New Zealand. Here she won the gold medal in the 57 kg open category bench press championships and the bronze medal in the 57 kg open category full power championships.

In August 2023 Cook won the silver medal at the European Bench Press Championships in the 57 kg open category on behalf of Great Britain, with an equipped bench press of 127.5kg. The Great Britain women's team also won the silver medal.

In August 2026 Cook won the gold medal at the European Bench Press Championships in the 63 kg open category, on behalf of Great Britain, with an equipped bench press of 152.5kg. The Great Britain women's team also won the gold medal.
