= Josephine Goube =

French entrepreneur

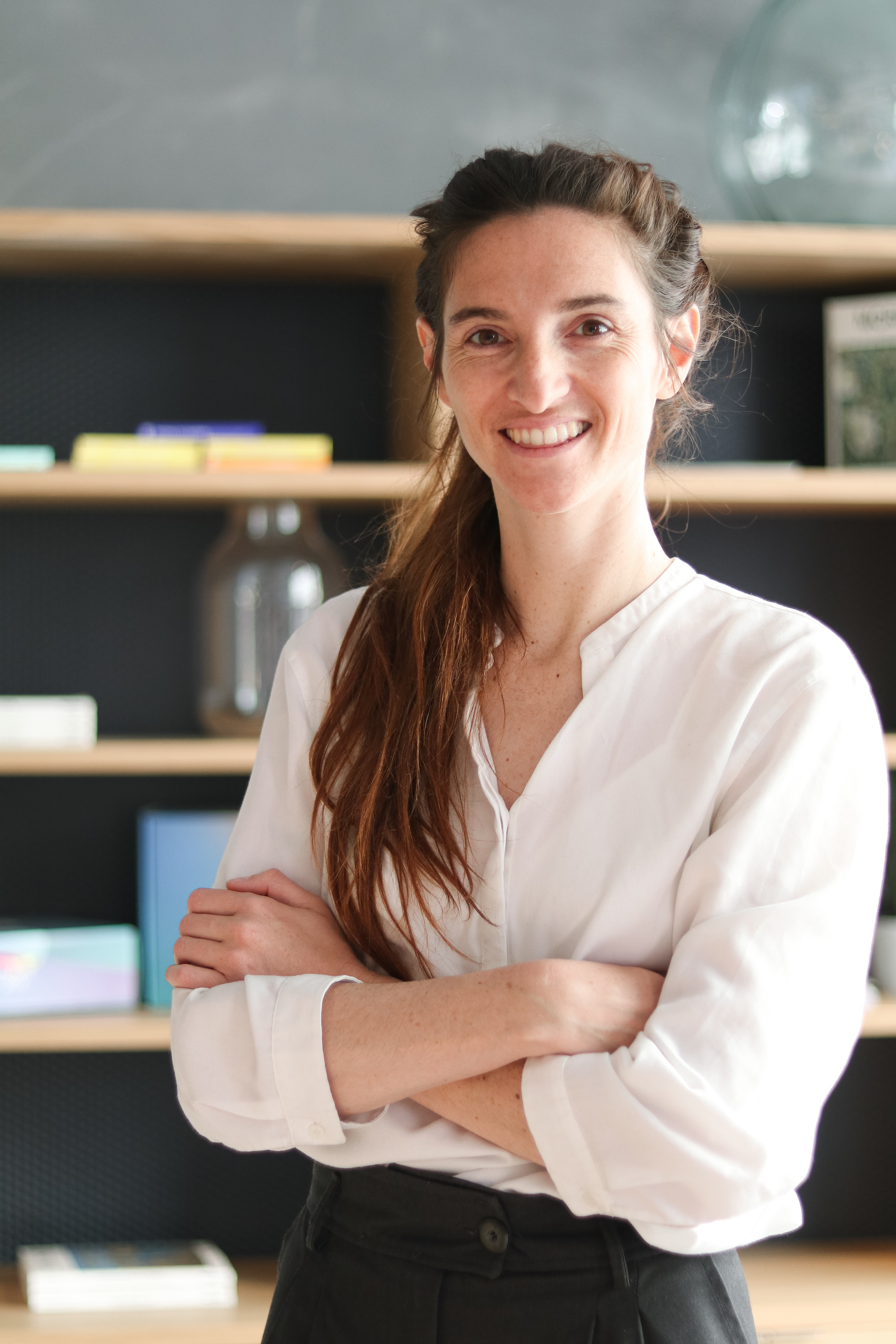
- Born: Boulogne sur mer
- Education: London School of Economics and Political Science; Paris Institute of Political Studies
- Occupations: Social entrepreneurship, digital innovation
- Years active: 2000s-present
- Organization: Sistech
- Awards: Forbes 30 Under 30

Josephine Goube is a French entrepreneur and refugee advocate currently serving as the founder and CEO of Sistech.

== Education ==
Josephine Goube grew up in France, where her early life experiences laid the groundwork for her future career in social entrepreneurship and humanitarian work [1]. Her academic journey started at renowned French institutions, and her pursuit of higher education led her to Paris Institute of Political Studies in 2006–2010, a prestigious university in Paris known for its focus on political science and international relations. At Sciences Po, Goube delved into topics such as urban planning and social advocacy, which broadened her perspective on societal issues [1].

Her academic path then took her to the London School of Economics and Political Science, a leading institution for studying economics and political science. Here, Goube further explored international affairs, gaining insights into global dynamics and the complexities of migration.

== Career ==
Goube's career began in tech and social startup incubator projects in London while she was still at LSE. She played various roles fostering entrepreneurship in the UK and Europe, including contributions to NACUE, StartupBootcamp European Accelerator, and as a fellow from the New Entrepreneurs Foundation. Her work at the Springboard London Accelerator Programme at Google's first startup campus laid the groundwork for her future endeavors. In 2012, Goube collaborated with Italian entrepreneur Marco Muccini to create Migreat, an online platform offering free visa information to migrants [6]. In 2013, she co-founded Girls In Tech London with the support of Roxanne Varza, further expanding her involvement in the tech community and her commitment to social causes.

In 2016, Goube's career took a pivotal turn when she co-founded Techfugees, a non-profit organization that uses technology to assist refugees [2]. Under her leadership, Techfugees expanded its reach to 10 countries, including Canada, Kenya, and Lebanon, and involved over 4,000 people in its programs [1]. One of Techfugees' key initiatives, the #TF4Women Fellowship Program, was launched by Goube in 2018. This program, aimed at supporting the inclusion of refugee women into sustainable tech and digital jobs, started with a small team in Paris providing mentoring, training, and networking opportunities [5].

In 2022, Goube decided to spin off the initiative under a new brand, Sistech, independently from Techfugees, marking a new chapter in her journey to support refugee women [4]. By 2021, the #TF4Women programs under Techfugees expanded to new countries, serving four times more women [5].

Josephine Goube has sat on the board of the Norwegian Refugee Council since 2018, has been a Schmidt Futures Fellow since 2022 and acted as an expert for the European Commission on migration reforms related to the Blue Card from 2015 until early 2020.

Three times in a row on the Forbes 30 under 30 list, she became known in the UK as one of Marie Claire UK's "Women at the Top" for her work as a Migration Campaigner in 2015. and named as one of "35 Women Under 35" to watch by Management Today.

== Impact ==
Goube's journey and the growth of Techfugees are more than just a story of personal success; they represent a model of how empathy, innovation, and technology can come together to address complex societal challenges. Her efforts have gained recognition in the global community, underscoring the potential of technology-driven solutions in humanitarian contexts.

In summary, Josephine Goube's career is based on technology and how it can be harnessed to accommodate existing problems.

== Awards ==
2016 - 30 Under 30 - All Star Alumni Forbes.

2016 - 30 Under 30 - Social Entrepreneurs (Forbes)

2017 - Prix Margaret (La journee de la femme digitale).

2017 - 30 Under 30 - Europe - All Star Alumni (Forbes)

2018 - 30 Under 30 - Europe - All-Star Alumni (Forbes)

2023 - Winner for the Women of Influence Prize by Prix de la Femme d'Influence

2024 - Obama Scholars 2024-25 with Columbia University

== Sources ==
[1] Baudu, L. J. (2017, May 27). Innovation : 20 Femmes Qui veulent changer Le Monde. La Tribune. https://www.latribune.fr/economie/france/innovation-20-femmes-qui-veulent-changer-le-monde-721242.html [2] Butcher, M. (2020, November 16). Techfugees nonprofit brings on new CEO to engage tech industry with refugee issues. TechCrunch. https://techcrunch.com/2020/11/16/techfugees-non-profit-brings-on-new-ceo-to-engage-tech-industry-with-refugee-issues/ [3] How to be successful as a hacktivist and CEO : With Josephine Goube. On The Dot Woman - Your Daily Dose of Inspiration. (2020, July 2). https://onthedotwoman.com/tips/hacktivist-ceo [4] Our story. Sistech. (2023, November 17). https://sis.tech/our-story/ [5] Rouge. (2022, May 17). Interview with Joséphine Goube, CEO at techfugees. Erevena. https://www.erevena.com/articles/josephine-goube-ceo-techfugees/ [6] This startup helps refugee women find Digital Jobs. Breaking Latest News. (2023, March 9). https://www.breakinglatest.news/technology/this-startup-helps-refugee-women-find-digital-jobs/
