= Nuisance (disambiguation) =

Nuisance is a common law tort causing inconvenience or damage.

It may also refer to:

- The Nuisance (1921 film)
- The Nuisance (1933 film)
- Nuisance (album)

== See also ==
- Nuisance parameter
