= Batteries Not Included (disambiguation) =

Batteries Not Included is a 1987 film by Matthew Robbins.

The term may also refer to:

- Batteries Not Included (TV series), a short-running British TV series
- Batteries Not Included (album), a 1982 After the Fire album
- Not Quite Human #1: Batteries Not Included, the first book (1985) in the Not Quite Human series by Seth McEvoy
