= This Is Craig Brown =

Book by Craig Brown

This is Craig Brown
- Author: Craig Brown
- Cover artist: Craig Brown
- Language: English
- Subject: Satirical Anthology
- Genre: Humour
- Publisher: Ebury Press
- Publication date: 19 February 2004
- Publication place: United Kingdom
- Media type: Print (Paperback)
- Pages: 448
- ISBN: 978-0-09-189606-5
- OCLC: 56457577

This is Craig Brown is a book by British satirist, Craig Brown.
