= Lesley Cunliffe =

American journalist and writer

- Born: Lesley Hume; May 21, 1945; Springfield, Massachusetts, United States
- Died: March 28, 1997 (aged 51); Adderbury, Oxfordshire, United Kingdom
- Occupations: Journalist, writer
- Spouse: Marcus Cunliffe (m. 1971–1980)

Lesley Cunliffe (née Hume; 21 May 1945 – 28 March 1997), also Lesley Hume Cunliffe, was an American journalist and writer.

== Biography ==
Cunliffe was born Lesley Hume in Springfield, Massachusetts in 1945, the daughter of Patricia Spooner and Robert Hume, an air force officer. Her career in journalism started working in television as assistant to reporter Gabe Pressman of NBC News. After relocating to England she was asked to become an editor for Harper's & Queen. She collaborated with Craig Brown on articles, some of which resulted in books: The Dirty Bits (1981) and The Book of Royal Lists (1983). During that period Cunliff also wrote other works, notably My passport to France (1985). She held several editorial positions at Tatler and the American- and English Vogue before becoming a freelance journalist for The Times Literary Supplement, Daily Telegraph, Sunday Times, Sunday Telegraph and Evening Standard.

== Personal ==
In 1971 Lesley married British scholar Marcus Cunliffe. They separated in 1979. After the divorce she dated Stan Gebler Davies, a fellow journalist. Lesley Cunliffe was well liked because of her 'joie de vivre'. According to Mary Killen who wrote her biography in The Independent:

"She always induced happiness in her visitors. Her eclectic style combined utter elegance with an eye for the witty."

She died in 1997 of stomach cancer at the age of 51.

== Publications ==
- 1975 – Burke's Presidential families of the United States of America (Burke's Peerage, ISBN 0850110335)
- 1981 – The Dirty Bits (Deutsch, ISBN 0233973958)
- 1983 – The Book of Royal Lists (Simon & Schuster, ISBN 0671472828)
- 1985 – My Passport to France (HarperCollins Publishers, ISBN 0006725007)
- 1986 – Great Royal Disasters (Book Club Associates, ISBN 021316938X)
- 1990 – The Book of Royal Trivia (Bounty Books, ISBN 185051397X)
