= Phill Jupitus =

British retired comedian (born 1962)

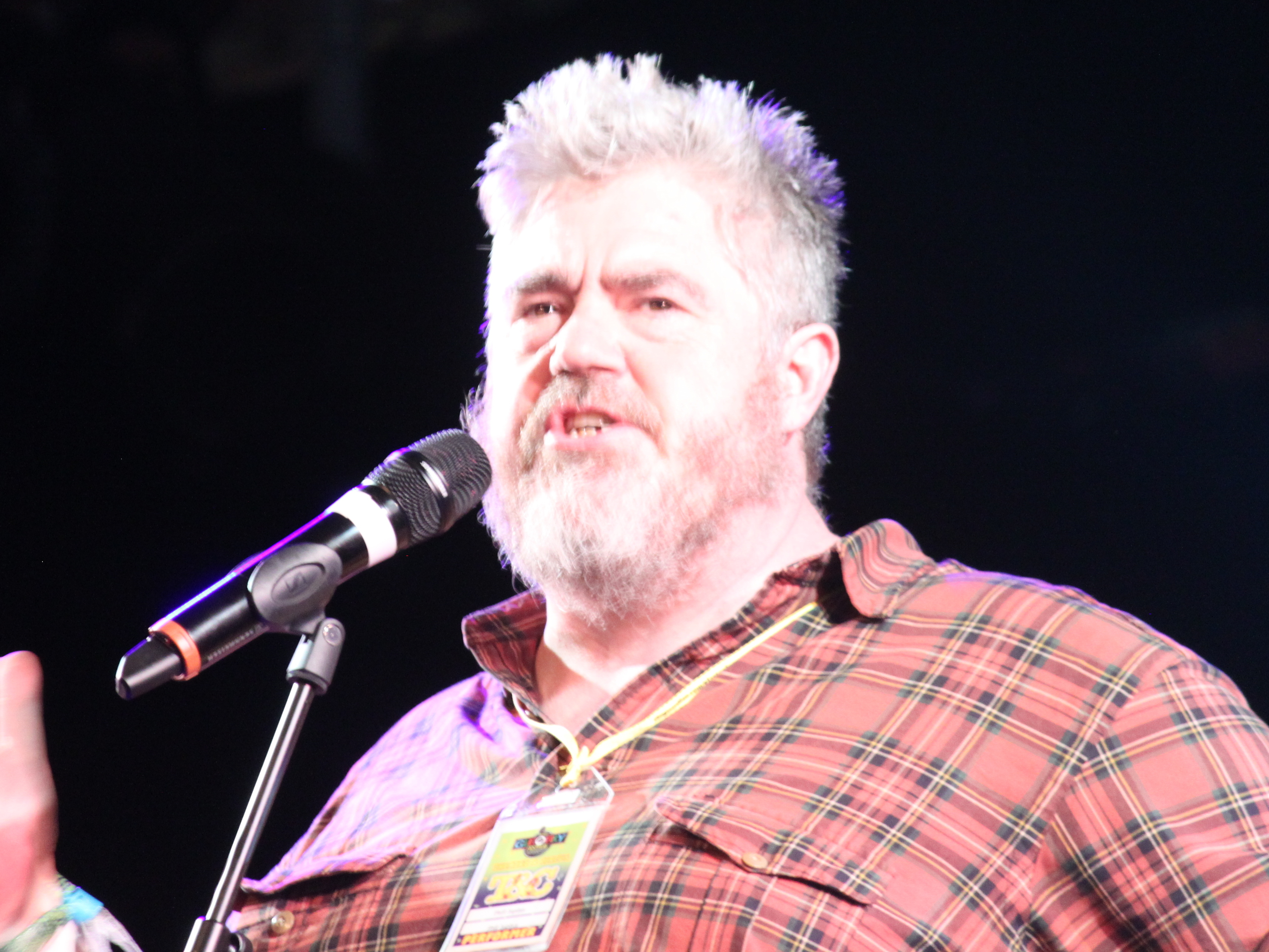
- Phill Jupitus at the 2019 Glastonbury Festival
- Born: Phillip Christopher Swan; 25 June 1962 (age 64); Newport, Isle of Wight, England
- Other name: Porky the Poet

Comedy career
- Years active: 1985–2021
- Medium: Stand-up, television, film
- Website: Official website

Phillip Christopher Jupitus (/ˈdʒuːpɪtəs/, né Swan; born 25 June 1962) is an English actor, performance poet, cartoonist, podcaster and retired stand-up and improv comedian. Jupitus was a team captain on all but one BBC Two-broadcast episode of music quiz Never Mind the Buzzcocks from its inception in 1996 until 2015, and also appeared regularly as a guest on several other panel shows, including QI and BBC Radio 4's I'm Sorry I Haven't a Clue.

From around 2018, Jupitus retired from performing and studied art at Duncan of Jordanstone College of Art & Design in Dundee.

== Early life ==
Born Phillip Swan in Newport on the Isle of Wight, Jupitus claims he was the "result of a very brief relationship" between his mother and another man, who he never knew, but would discover as an adult already had three daughters and a son at the time of Jupitus' birth, and died in 1985. He has a half-brother, and a half-sister born in 1978.

His family moved to Essex when he was four, where he attended a primary school in Barking, and a comprehensive school before winning a place at the boys' grammar boarding school Woolverstone Hall School near Ipswich.

The surname Jupitus came as a result of the misspelling of his Stepfather Bob's Lithuanian surname, Šeputis, by an immigration officer when Bob's grandparents arrived in Britain in 1917, according to Phill, the document their surname was on was written in Cyrillic script, and claims the name is "just an immigration official's estimation of the Cyrillic spelling"; Jupitus adopted the surname when he was sixteen.

Jupitus dropped out of school before his A-levels and worked in Essex at the Manpower Services Commission, part of the Department of Employment, for five years, while he also wrote political poetry and drew cartoons. He resigned from the department in 1984, hoping for a career in the music industry.

== Career ==
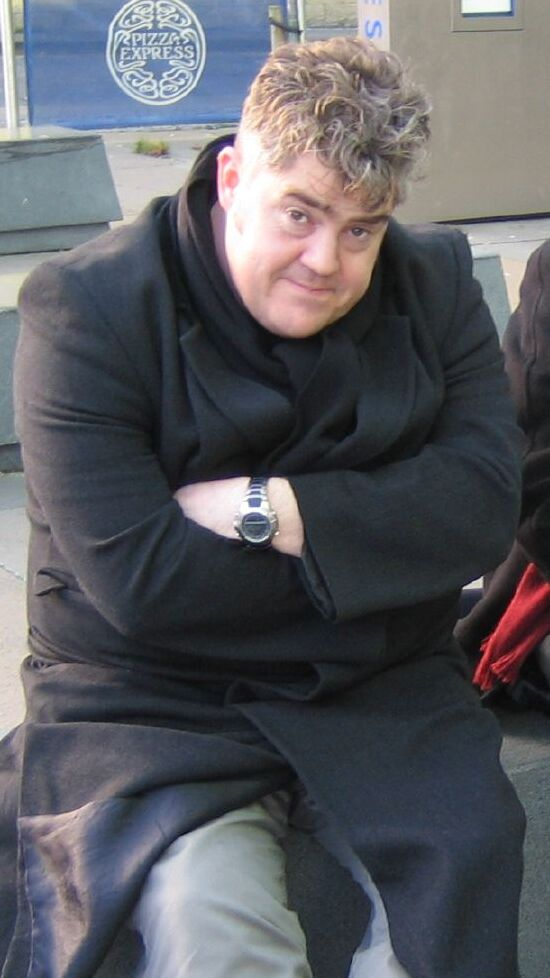
Phill Jupitus in Edinburgh, 2006

Using the performing name Porky the Poet, Jupitus became associated with Anti-Fascist Action and the ranting poetry scene, alongside Seething Wells and Attila the Stockbroker. Jupitus approached local bands to offer himself as a support act for their tours: "I thought it looked easy, I was very cheap. If you got another band to support you, there are probably four of them and roadies and managers. But me—I just turned up and read poems." His first vinyl recordings were part of the live Newtown Neurotics album Kickstarting a Backfiring Nation as Porky the Poet in 1987.

Jupitus toured colleges, universities and student unions, supporting bands such as Billy Bragg, the Style Council and The Housemartins. He supported Billy Bragg once more on the Labour Party-sponsored Red Wedge tour in 1985: "In the early '80s, I got involved with Red Wedge, in which Neil Kinnock got various bands to stage concerts for Labour. The reason I got involved was 20% because I believed in the cause, 30% because I loved Billy Bragg, and 50% because I wanted to meet Paul Weller".

After Red Wedge, he found it difficult to get other bookings, due to the decline of political poetry as a mainstream art. He got a job as a runner for the independent record label Go! Discs, which had signed Billy Bragg and other bands, such as the Housemartins. Bragg said: "We ended up managing to get him a job at Go! Discs, which was brilliant. I was concerned that the cut-throat nature of the record business would make him jaded—underneath that rhino exterior there is quite a sensitive person—but that was before I realised that he was going to come back and do gigs again. Working at Go! Discs got his confidence up."

His performances of two of his poems, "Beano" and "Nobby", were included in the 1986 album Not Just Mandela, alongside tracks by Bragg and Attila the Stockbroker, amongst others. Released on Davy Lamp Records, all proceeds of the record were going to the Anti-Apartheid Movement.

Jupitus became press officer and compère for The Housemartins (appearing in the 1986 music video for "Happy Hour"), using the role to continue being in front of an audience, while also filling support slots for other artists. During this time, he worked as a warm-up act on the Channel 4 TV show The Show. He quit working for Go! Discs in 1989 and fell back on his poetry and competing to try to gain a foothold on the London comedy circuit.

He conceived and directed the Brit Awards-nominated music video for Bragg's "Sexuality" in 1991 and wrote a parody version of that song about bestiality. He also appeared alongside R.E.M. in the music video for Bragg's "You Woke Up My Neighbourhood" and performed in Searchlight magazine's 2006 "Hope Not Hate" campaign tour with Bragg. He has also appeared numerous times at the Glastonbury Festival as a DJ and a compere in The Left Field tent. Jupitus produced the music video for Kirsty MacColl's 1991 single "All I Ever Wanted" from the album Electric Landlady. He appeared at her tribute concert in 2002 as compere, and also sang one of her songs, "Fifteen Minutes".

In 2000, he released the stand-up comedy DVD Phill Jupitus Live: Quadrophobia. In 2001, he appeared as a sports journalist in the film Mike Bassett: England Manager.

Jupitus made a guest appearance on the Bonzo Dog Doo-Dah Band 40th anniversary DVD performing with the band on the tracks "Mr. Apollo" and "Canyons of Your Mind", and has toured with them around the UK. He appears on the Bonzos' 2007 album, Pour l'Amour des Chiens. Also in 2007, he performed with The Blockheads on their 30th anniversary tour. He continued to perform with them sporadically since Ian Dury's death, also appearing in Dury's place for "Drip Fed Fred" during the Madness concert at Wembley Arena shortly before Dury's death. Jupitus performed at the Reading and Leeds Festivals in 2008.

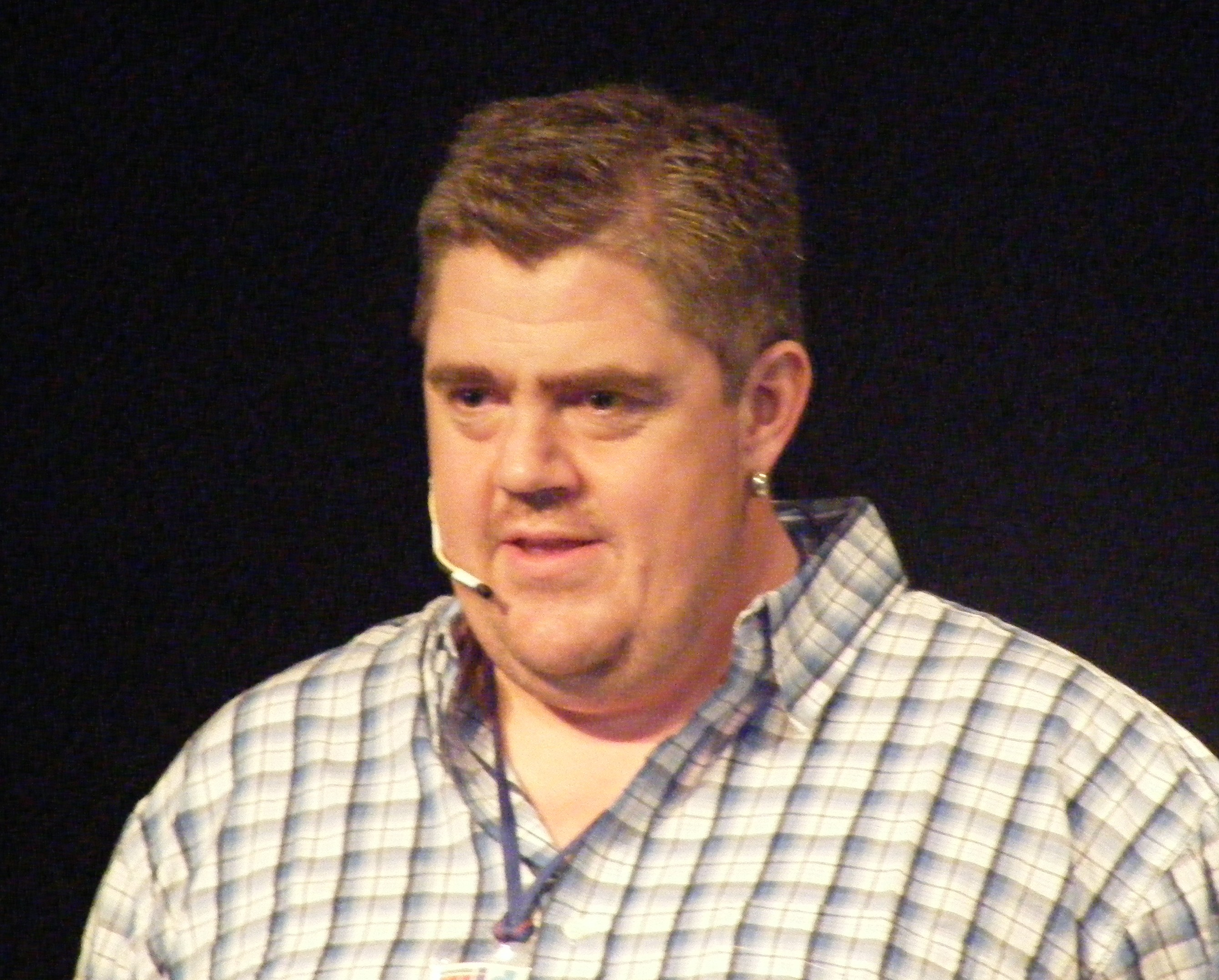
Jupitus at the 2009 Glastonbury Festival

On 13–14 February 2009, Jupitus co-hosted the first BadMovieClub on Twitter. At midnight, over 2,000 Twitter users simultaneously pressed 'Play' on the film The Happening and continued to tweet whilst watching, creating a collective viewing experience that generated 40,000 tweets in under two hours. The first showing took place at 9:00pm, hosted by Graham Linehan. Jupitus was awarded an honorary doctorate by the University of Essex in South Essex College's congregation ceremony in Southend on 30 September 2010. Jupitus was also awarded an honorary doctorate from the University of Kent which his daughters had previously attended, in 2017.

On 6 October 2010, Jupitus, along with Emma Kennedy, hosted a special comedy evening at the Canterbury Animation Festival 'Anifest'.

Jupitus attended the "I Do To Equal Marriage" event which celebrated the introduction of same-sex marriage in England and Wales in March 2014.

=== Radio ===
Jupitus began hosting his own radio show on BBC GLR in 1995, a regular job that would last until 2000.

After that, he embarked on his first stand-up comedy tour of the UK, Jedi, Steady, Go, performing the Star Wars story in a comedic fashion.

In 2002, Jupitus was a stand-in presenter on BBC Radio 2 for Steve Wright while he was away on holiday.

Jupitus was the breakfast DJ on BBC Radio 6 Music from 2002 until 30 March 2007 (the last song played, by listener request, was "Broadway" by The Clash), and made brief returns to the station during the summer of 2007, sitting in for Stephen Merchant on Sunday afternoon and Liz Kershaw on Saturday mornings. In 2010, he publicly criticised the BBC's announcement that it was to discontinue the station, describing the decision as "not only an act of cultural vandalism, it's also an affront to the memory of John Peel and a slap in the face to thousands of licence-payers." Jupitus has since written a book about his time on 6 Music, entitled Good Morning Nantwich: Adventures in Breakfast Radio. In February 2010, as part of his research for the book, Jupitus presented the breakfast show for one week on Bournemouth University student radio station, Nerve Radio, produced by Mog McIntyre and co-presented by regular student presenters Guy Larsen and Jess Bracey.

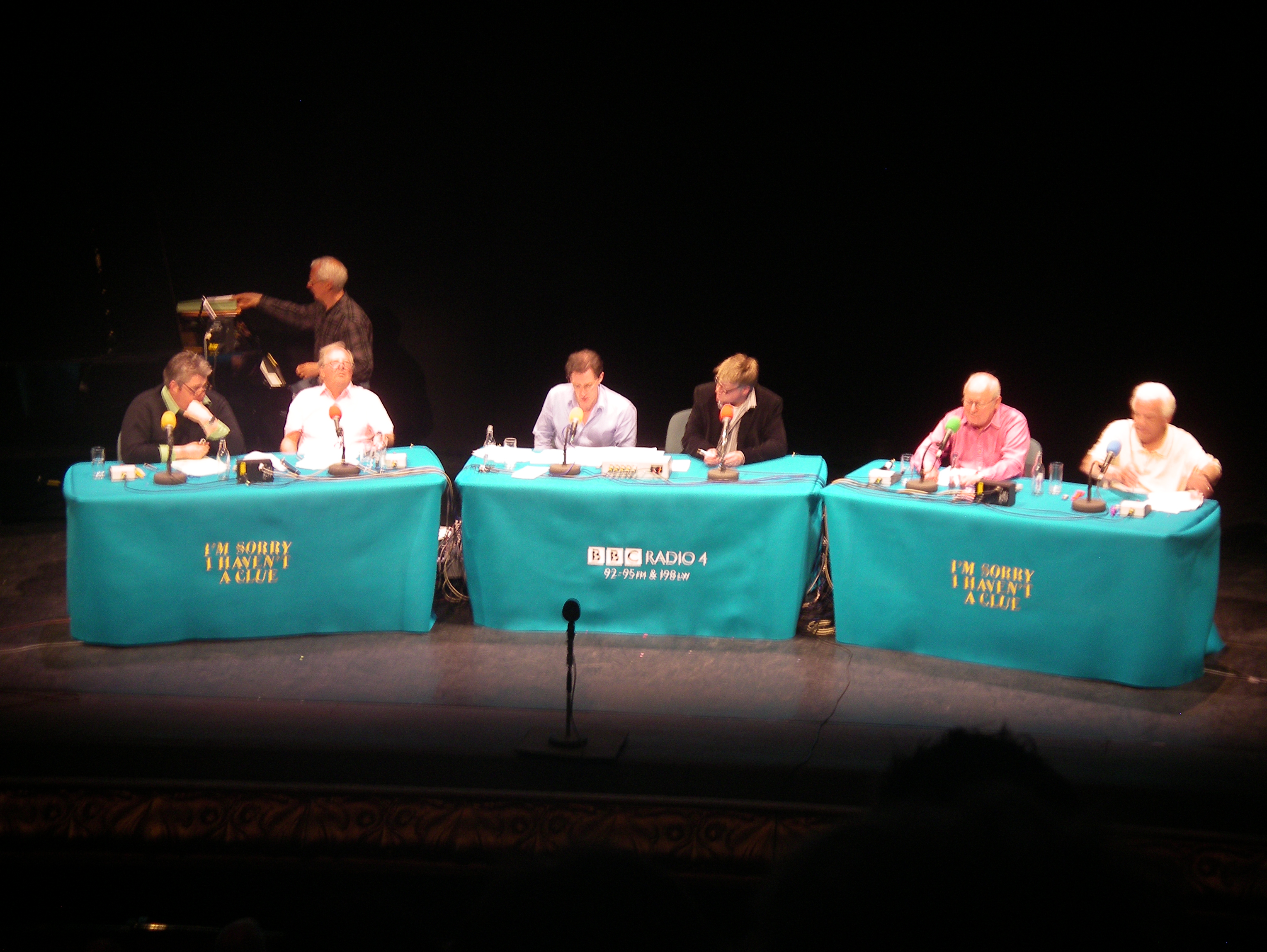
Jupitus (far left) during a recording of I'm Sorry I Haven't a Clue in 2009

On 9 September 2009, Jupitus narrated a half-hour documentary on BBC Radio 4 about the comic strip Calvin and Hobbes created by Bill Watterson.

Jupitus has worked on Radio 4 as a regular contributor to Loose Ends, The News Quiz (where his performances are notable for a range of parody voices), I'm Sorry I Haven't a Clue and Just a Minute. He also presented Best Sellers—a series on the life and work of Peter Sellers—and wrote and presented Disneyfied, a documentary on the work of Walt Disney. On 7 June 2020 he presented Pick of the Week.

Jupitus has also appeared in several episodes of the Radio 4 show The Unbelievable Truth and is a regular guest with the Comedy Store Players.

=== Television ===
Jupitus was one of the panellists on the first TV episode of the show Loose Talk, which made a brief transition from radio to television in 1994. In 1996, he joined BBC Two's pop quiz show Never Mind the Buzzcocks as a regular team captain – having appeared in every single episode of the original run, except for series 25, episode 6. He was a frequent guest panellist on QI from 2003 until 2020, while his daughter, Emily Jupitus, later started working on the show as a researcher (or 'QI Elf'). He had a history of mimicking the QI host, Stephen Fry, while on the show. In December 1999, he had the lead role in Dark Ages, an ITV sitcom parodying preparations (and fears) for the year 2000, set in Essex in the year 999. Jupitus has played Councillor Cowdrey in CITV children's series Bottom Knocker Street since its first series in summer 2013.

Jupitus has presented several editions of the popular Top Ten series for Channel 4, while also joining another comedy panel game—It's Only TV...but I Like It—as a team captain, alongside Jonathan Ross and Julian Clary.

He has made one appearance in an episode of Holby City as a patient (in "Men are from Mars"). As a voice actor he has provided the voices for Dandelion in an ITV adaptation of Watership Down, for the first two series only, and also performing a selection of voices for Rex the Runt by Aardman Animations.

Jupitus is a continuity announcer for the UKTV channel Dave during the channel's evening schedule. During 2008, he did the voice over work for the Dave show Batteries Not Included. He also took part in the Dave show Comedy Exchange, where he went to America, while Eugene Mirman came to Britain. Here they each performed different routines in various events. He has appeared in Argumental for the same channel, where team captain Marcus Brigstocke made him laugh so hard he fell off his chair and took a long time to recover. Jupitus and Brigstocke were reunited on the Radio 4 show (hosted by Brigstocke) I've Never Seen Star Wars, in which Jupitus tried out things that he'd never attempted before, such as eating a Findus Crispy Pancake, undergoing a colonic irrigation, and shaving another person's head.

During the 2008 Major League Baseball season, Jupitus presented a feature during the seventh inning stretch of Channel Five's featured Sunday night game. Each week he would read a section or quote from one of his favourite baseball-related books. He is a fan of the Boston Red Sox and has their logo tattooed on his arm.

In December 2008, Jupitus took part as a guest presenter on RTÉ's comical topical discussion show The Panel.

=== Theatre ===
Jupitus co-wrote and starred in the play Waiting for Alice with Andre Vincent which had a run at the Edinburgh Fringe Festival. The premiere took place on 16 July 2007 at the St. Ives Theatre in St Ives, Cornwall.

Jupitus and Marcus Brigstocke appeared together in the UK tour of Totally Looped, performing at the Theatre Royal, Brighton, the Kings Theatre, Southsea and the Victoria Hall, Stoke-on-Trent in spring 2009.

In October 2009, Jupitus joined the West End theatre cast of Hairspray, playing the role of Edna Turnblad at the Shaftesbury Theatre. He joined the 2011 tour of Spamalot, playing the role of King Arthur.

On 16 January 2015, Jupitus was confirmed as starring opposite Jason Manford in the 2015 tour of Mel Brooks' musical The Producers, portraying Franz Liebkind. He has since appeared in Chitty Chitty Bang Bang also alongside Jason Manford on a tour of the UK.

=== Podcasts ===
From August 2008 Jupitus was the host of The Times football podcast "The Game", replacing the previous co-hosts Gabriele Marcotti and Guillem Balagué, although Marcotti was still a regular pundit on the show and hosted again on Jupitus' departure.

Between September 2008 and June 2011, Jupitus produced a podcast along with Phil Wilding, who produced his BBC 6Music show, called Phill and Phil's Perfect Ten. Initially being released fortnightly, it later became more sporadic due to the pair's work commitments. In April 2009, archive episodes were made available for purchase on Audible and iTunes as audiobook bundles of four with bonus 'perfect ones' attached. Since ending the podcast in June 2011 the pair have indicated that all back-episodes will be released free at some point in the future.

In 2018 Jupitus was interviewed by Jodie Cook for the Clever Tykes podcast: Creating Useful People. The podcast explores the childhood influences that shape future success. In Jupitus' episode he talked about how he developed his ethos for life and work, as well as his mum's dreams for him as a naval merchant.

=== Art ===
Early in his career Jupitus drew cartoons which appeared in the NME, Time Out, Radio Times and The Guardian. In 2019 he started studying a degree in fine art at the Duncan of Jordanstone School of Art, Dundee University. He has also curated collections for the Art UK website. He wrote the foreword for the book Leigh Art in which he reminisces about childhood visits to Leigh-on-Sea and his enjoyment for the annual Leigh Art Trail.

== Personal life ==
Jupitus is married with children; as of 2018 he lives in Fife, Scotland, but prior to the move was living in Southend-on-Sea. His daughter Emily is an "Elf" (researcher and writer) for the game show QI.

He is a fan of West Ham United football club and the Boston Red Sox baseball team.

Jupitus discussed his arachnophobia with the writer and broadcaster Suzy Klein on the BBC Radio 4 programme I'm Suzy, and I'm a Phobic, which was broadcast in January 2013.

== Filmography ==
=== Film ===
Year	Title	Role	Notes
2001	Mike Bassett: England Manager	Tommo Thompson	
2010	The Safest Place for Fruit Is in Carmen Miranda's Hat	The Narrator	Short film
2012	No Prisoners	Art	Short film

=== Television ===
Date	Title	Role	Notes
1996–2015	Never Mind the Buzzcocks	Panel Leader	
1998	Norman Ormal: A Very Political Turtle	Yob Comedian 2	TV movie
1998	Harry Enfield and Chums		Episode: "Harry Enfield's Yule Log Chums"
1998–1999	Comedy Nation	Various roles	
1999	Dark Ages	Gudrun	
1999–2000	Watership Down	Dandelion	Voice only (Series 1 and 2 only)
2001	Rex the Runt	Morris the One-Gloved Mouse / The Ants / Sergeant Major	3 episodes
2001	Holby City	Andy Thompson	Episode: "Men Are from Mars"
2003-2021	QI	Himself	46 appearances as of Feb 2023
2004	Swiss Toni	Himself	1 episode
2007	Doctors	Wally Albright	2 episodes
2010	Aliens vs. Predator	Additional voices	Video game
2011	Phineas and Ferb	Adrian Fletcher	Episode: "My Fair Goalie"
2013	Bottom Knocker Street	Councillor Cowdrey	
2014	Alan Davies: As Yet Untitled	Himself	Episode: "Sex is fun"
2016	Drunk History	Captain Edward Smith / William the Bastard	2 episodes
2017–2021	Pete the Cat	Wilson the Owl	13 episodes
