= Sarah Baxendale =

British actress (born 1979)

- Born: 23 April 1978 (age 48)
- Education: St Mary's Catholic High School, Astley
- Occupation: Actress
- Years active: 2000–present
- Television: Hollyoaks

Sarah Baxendale (born 23 April 1978) is a British actress. She began her career with guest appearances in Fat Friends and Doctors, as well as appearing in the television movie My Beautiful Son (also known as Strange Relations). From 2002 to 2005, she portrayed Ellie Mills on the British soap opera Hollyoaks, which she also played in the one-off spinoff Hollyoaks: Leap of Faith (2003). For her role as Ellie, Baxendale was longlisted for Best Actress at the 2004 British Soap Awards. After leaving the soap, she appeared in the theatre productions Wrestling Mad (2005) and Secrets (2009), the television comedy-drama A Civil Arrangement (2012), the gameshow whodunnit series Armchair Detectives (2017) and the films The Knife That Killed Me (2014) and Happy New Year, Colin Burstead (2018). She has also guest-starred in various other television and internet shows, including Benidorm and Holby City.

== Early life ==
Sarah Baxendale was born on 23 April 1978. She attended St Mary's Catholic High School, Astley, which she later returned to present the year 11 record of achievements.

== Career ==
In 2000, Baxendale appeared in "Face the Fat", the fifth episode of the drama series Fat Friends. She also appeared in the soap opera Doctors and the television movie My Beautiful Son (also known as Strange Relations). She then began portraying Ellie Mills on the Channel 4 soap opera Hollyoaks, with her first appearance originally airing in February 2002. Baxendale enjoyed portraying Ellie and was on contract with the soap. Baxendale said of joining, "Coming into it is exciting. I'm working with people I've been watching for a long time, but they have made me welcome." She watched the soap before joining the cast and would watch it on Sunday mornings after night outs on Saturday evenings as part of the soap's "hangover audience". Several of Baxendale's colleagues believed that she was the younger sister of actress Helen Baxendale, but the two are actually not related, with Sarah Baxendale explaining, "I've had so many people ask me that since I came here - everyone in the MTV building thought I was related in some way and they had even started seeing similarities between us both."

During her time on the soap, Ellie's storylines included marrying serial killer Toby Mills (Henry Luxemburg) and being disowned by her family. Baxendale also played the role in the 2003 late-night special spin-off, Hollyoaks: Leap of Faith, which saw Ellie attempt to kill herself before Toby is killed by her brother. In 2002, Baxendale and Hollyoaks broke the Guinness Book of Records's world record of the longest kiss featured onscreen, with the characters of Ellie and Ben Davies (Marcus Patric) kissing for 3 minutes and 15 seconds; of the kiss, Baxendale said, "I think we did it in about five takes but not every kiss went on for the full three minutes! I had kissed Marcus before, because our characters have been a couple for a few weeks now, but I cleaned my teeth about 50 million times." For her role in Hollyoaks, Baxendale was longlisted for Best Actress at the 2004 British Soap Awards, whilst "Leap of Faith" was nominated for Spectacular Scene of the Year at the same awards. Baxendale left Hollyoaks in 2005 and has since appeared in another soap opera, Coronation Street, in addition to another stint in Doctors.

In 2005, she appeared in the play Wrestling Mad at the Hull Truck Theatre; she was replaced by Amy Thompson when the play ran later that year. In 2008, Baxendale played a receptionist in the second episode of the three-part BBC One comedy-drama Sunshine. The following year, Baxendale took part in the production of Secrets, a composition where the secrets of eight actors reveal a personal secret and have it "woven into a narrative", at the Kilburn theatre, which ran from 17 November to 5 December 2009. She was a last-minute replacement for Rachael Boulton, and as a result, Baxendale took over Boulton's secret rather than revealing her own. Baxendale guest-starred in an episode of the thirteenth series of the British medical drama Holby City which originally aired on 12 April 2011. She has also returned to Doctors once again for one-off stints as different characters in the episodes originally airing on 17 May 2013, 16 January 2015 and 19 April 2018.

Baxendale played Kelly in the BBC Four one-off television comedy A Civil Arrangement, which was originally broadcast on 6 May 2012. She portrayed Shane's mother in the 2014 drama film The Knife That Killed Me. In 2017, she appeared in an episode of the ninth series of the British sitcom Benidorm. She also played SOCO Simmons in the 2017 British gameshow whodunnit series Armchair Detectives. Baxendale made an appearance in the second episode of the British crime drama Hard Sun, which aired in January 2018. She also played the main role of Paula in the comedy drama film Happy New Year, Colin Burstead. The film premiered at the 2018 BFI London Film Festival. Baxendale portrayed Ruby in two episodes of the second series of the online sitcom M.O.T.H.E.R Knows Best, which were both released in March 2020. She has also appeared in Bo' Selecta! and Loose Women.

== Acting credits ==
=== Filmography ===
Year	Title	Role	Notes	Ref(s).
Unknown	Coronation Street	—N/a	—N/a	
Unknown	Doctors	—N/a	—N/a	
2000	Fat Friends	Trendy Assistant	Series 1, episode 5 ("Face the Fat")	
2001	My Beautiful Son/Strange Relations	—N/a	Television movie	
2002–05	Hollyoaks	Ellie Mills	Regular role	
2003	Hollyoaks: Leap of Faith	Ellie Mills	Late night spinoff	
2008	Sunshine	Receptionist	Episode 2	
2011	Holby City	Gemma Lavelle	1 episode ("Boy Valentine, Girl Valentine")	
2012	A Civil Arrangement	Kelly	One-off television comedy-drama	
2013	Doctors	Rosemary McMann	1 episode ("Crash Barrier")	
2014	The Knife That Killed Me	Shane's Mother	Drama film	
2015	Doctors	Katia Palowsi	1 episode ("Safe House")	
2017	Benidorm	Jenny	1 episode (Series 9, episode 7)	
2017	Armchair Detectives	SOCO Simmons	1 series	
2018	Hard Sun	Frankie Buckley	1 episode ("Episode 2")	
2018	Doctors	Susie Fleetwood	1 episode ("Place of Safety")	
2018	Happy New Year, Colin Burstead	Paula	Comedy drama film	
2020	M.O.T.H.E.R Knows Best	Ruby	2 episodes	

=== Theatre ===
Year	Production	Role	Venue	Ref.
2005	Wrestling Mad	—N/a	Hull Truck Theatre	
2009	Secrets	—N/a	Kilburn theatre	

== Awards and nominations ==
List of acting awards and nominations
Year	Award	Category	Title	Result	Ref.
2004	British Soap Awards	Best Actress	Hollyoaks	Longlisted	
2004	British Soap Awards	Spectacular Scene of the Year	Hollyoaks	Shortlisted	
