= Daydream (disambiguation) =

A daydream is a fantasy that a person has while awake.

Daydream(s) or Day Dream(s) may also refer to:

== Film ==
- Daydreams (1915 film), a Russian silent film directed by Yevgeni Bauer
- Day Dreams (1919 film), an American lost silent film directed by Clarence Badger
- Day Dreams (1922 film), an American film starring Buster Keaton
- Daydream (1964 film) a Japanese pink film directed by Tetsuji Takechi
- Daydream (1981 film) a Japanese pink film directed by Tetsuji Takechi

== Music ==
=== Albums ===
- Daydream (Aimer album), 2016
- Daydream (Karrin Allyson album), 1997
- Daydream (Katherine Jenkins album), 2011
- Daydream (The Lovin' Spoonful album) or the title song (see below), 1966
- Daydream (Mariah Carey album), 1995
- Daydream – Moorland, by Tangerine Dream, a soundtrack from the TV series Tatort, 1983
- Daydream (D-Crunch EP), 2021
- Daydream (Day6 EP), 2016
- Day Dreams (Doris Day album), 1955
- Day Dreams (June Christy album), 2012

=== Songs ===
- "Day Dream", a jazz standard composed by Duke Ellington and Billy Strayhorn with lyrics by John Latouche, 1941
- "Daydream" (The Lovin' Spoonful song), 1966
- "Daydream" (Wallace Collection song), 1969; covered by the Gunter Kallmann Choir (1970) and others
- "Daydream", by B'z from Highway X, 2022
- "Daydream", by Dreamcatcher from The End of Nightmare, 2019
- "Daydream", by Iz*One from Bloom*Iz, 2020
- "Daydream", by J-Hope from Hope World, 2018
- "Daydream", by John Denver from Rhymes & Reasons, 1969
- "Daydream", by Journey from Evolution, 1979
- "Daydream", by Judy and Mary, 1994
- "Day Dream", by Lisa Dal Bello from Lisa Dal Bello, 1977
- "Daydream", by Markus Schulz and Andy Moor, 2008
- "Daydream", by Mike Oldfield from Tres Lunas, 2002
- "Daydream", by Miranda Cosgrove from Sparks Fly, 2010
- "Day Dream", by NCT 127 from Neo Zone, 2020
- "Daydream", by Robin Trower from Twice Removed from Yesterday, 1973
- "Daydream", by the Smashing Pumpkins from Gish, 1991
- "Daydream", by Sweet from Funny How Sweet Co-Co Can Be, 1971
- "Daydream", by Tycho from Dive, 2011
- "Daydream", by Vinnie Moore from Mind's Eye, 1986
- "Daydreams", by Maisie Peters, 2020

== Other uses ==
- The Day-Dream, an 1842 poem by Alfred, Lord Tennyson
- The Day Dream (painting), an 1880 painting by Dante Gabriel Rossetti
- "Day Dream" (2 Stupid Dogs), a 1994 television episode
- Ghost Talker's Daydream or simply Daydream, a shōnen manga by Saki Okuse and Sankichi Meguro
- Google Daydream, a discontinued virtual reality platform
- Daydreams, a screensaver system introduced in Android 4.2

== See also ==
- Daydreamer (disambiguation)
- Daydreaming (disambiguation)
