= Menswear (band) =

Britpop band

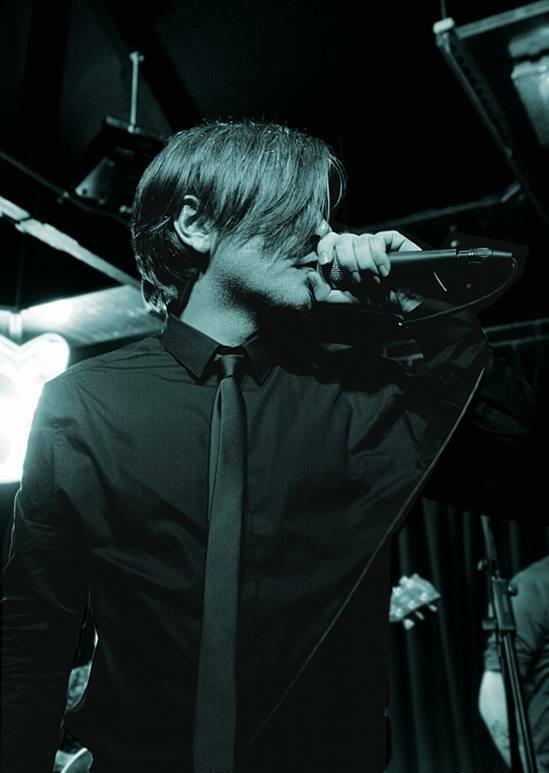
- Johnny Dean of Menswear in 2013

Background information
- Origin: Camden Town, London, England
- Genres: Britpop; indie rock
- Years active: 1994–1998, 2013–2015
- Labels: Laurel, Polydor
- Past members: Johnny Dean; Chris Gentry; Simon White; Stuart Black; Matt Everitt; Darren "Tud" Tudgay; Todd Parmenter; Paul Fletcher

Menswear were an English indie rock band formed in 1994 in Camden, London. The band released a number of singles and debut album Nuisance in 1995, on the short-lived London Records subsidiary label Laurel. A second album was recorded, but rejected by the label. It would only be released in Japan via another label, and the band split up in 1998.

In 2013, frontman Johnny Dean reformed the band with himself as the only original member involved proclaiming that "as long as the singer's singing, it doesn't really matter who's playing the instruments".

== History ==
=== Formation to initial breakup ===
The band was formed in 1994 by singer Johnny Dean and bassist Stuart Black, initiated at a 1993 meeting at the Blow Up Club on Oxford Street, London. Dean then enlisted guitarist Chris Gentry, who he knew through a mutual friend from their hometown of Southend-on-Sea. The 3 befriended Blur guitarist Graham Coxon, who would often let them stay at his home in Camden. Black also played trumpet on stage with Blur. Original drummer Todd Parmenter was soon replaced by Matt Everitt. Additional guitarist Simon White was enlisted. The band were managed by Adrian Webb, who ran the Club Smashing nights at the Good Mixer in Camden. Thanks to their newly acquired connections with the local music scene, the band landed a front cover feature in Melody Maker and mentioned in Select magazine before they had released their debut single.

Initially, the band's fashion was mod in style and as part of their record deal all had suits made by iconic Soho tailor Mark Powell. Musically, they were influenced by Blur's second album Modern Life Is Rubbish and Elastica.

Following a bidding war between record companies, the band signed to London Records for £90,000 and a lucrative 18.5% gross revenues after just their fifth gig. Shortly afterwards, they signed a £500,000 publishing deal despite having just seven songs in their repertoire - working out at around £70,000 per song.

They appeared on Top of the Pops a week before their first single had even been released. Their first single was "I'll Manage Somehow". Their second single "Daydreamer" peaked at number 14 in the UK Singles Chart, but saw the band accused of plagiarising Wire; AllMusic describes the track as sounding "more like Wire than Elastica, only funnier, even if it may be unintentional". In 2013, Dean complained about accusations of copying Elastica, stating that "Daydreamer is ripping off Wire. Not Elastica. And we were not sued by Wire like Elastica were, because Daydreamer is influenced by Wire, rather than plagiarising them. I was actually introduced to Wire by Graham Coxon, not Elastica." However, in 2024 in response to a video uploaded by comedian Limmy he admitted that the band "were actually ripping off Elastica ripping off Wire by the way. Not Bowie. That was Suede innit?".

The band released their debut album Nuisance in 1995, described by AllMusic as "the perfect product from a band that is better known for being seen than being heard". The album spawned five singles, with the last, "Being Brave" gave the band their first and only top ten hit. However, drummer Matt Everitt would soon leave Menswear due to personality differences with the other members, a decision that Dean would later call one of his biggest regrets because "Matt was always the sensible one, and it was the first sign to the record company that we were beginning to lose it, which I agree with."

A stand-alone single, "We Love You", was released in late 1996 and stalled at number 22 on the UK chart and marked a change in the band's musical direction.

The band began work on their second album ¡Hay Tiempo!. By this point, drummer Matt Everett had been sacked and replaced by his drum tech Darren Tudgay and keyboard player Paul Fletcher was added to the lineup. Commenting on the album, Dean stated that "the second album is quite a befuddling thing really. A strange beast. Very much a cocaine and heroin record. I have difficulty listening to it. I don't even regard it as a Menswear record to be totally honest" and that he was "fairly unconvinced by the whole thing, but by that point I had passed the point of caring. It was a compromise, that album. Internally Menswear suffered from a lot of disruption. There were always factions within the band and it's entourage. Sometimes it appeared the entourage had far more influence over what happened than the actual band members. It was very unhealthy". However, in 2020 he also stated that "it's a really good record that people should hear, but you can hear how lost we were. We were a punk/indie band, suddenly making five-minute acid-tinged country-rock pieces. It was career suicide".

The band's UK label were unimpressed with the new material, and dropped the band in 1997. The album was only released in Japan via Polydor in 1998. They played their last live show at London's Camden Palace the same year.

Commenting on the split, frontman Dean stated that "most bands are mentally damaged or indeed deficient. Menswear had both in aces. I was an undiagnosed autistic, and the other guys had their problems and demons. Drugs, depression, unbridled narcissism, delusion, arrogance, paranoia, closeted homosexual tendencies. It was all there. Freud would have had a field day on our tour bus".

=== Post-split ===
Following his departure from the band, original drummer Todd Parmenter performed with Heck, Lungleg, The Beal, Evan Dando and The Beatings.

After leaving in 1996, drummer Matt Everitt joined The Montrose Avenue, and is now on staff at radio station 6Music.

Stuart Black formed a new band, Messiah, that lasted until 2000. Guitarist Chris Gentry went on to play with the band, Vatican DC.

Simon White played as a touring and studio musician for various artists including Finley Quaye.

Dean was diagnosed with Asperger syndrome in 2008 and has started campaigning on behalf of the National Autistic Society. In recent interviews Dean has expressed the torment he experienced before his diagnosis and his desire to raise awareness of the Autistic syndrome spectrum. On Friday 7 June 2013 Dean made his first sold out live appearance in 15 years with the Nuisance Band performing the songs of David Bowie which raised thousands of pounds for The National Autistic Society in London.

=== Reunion with new lineup ===
In 2013, Dean reformed the band with himself as the only original member involved. Dean was backed by members of The Nuisance Band. The band played their first show in 15 years on 16 August 2013 in aid of the mental health charity PMA Sport's Academy and #TimeToChange campaign.

On 26 March 2014, the new lineup of Menswear performed their first headline gig at London's Bush Hall, debuting the new single "Crash '14". The single was released on 26 May that year via Nuisance Recordings & POST/POP Records on limited edition 7" and cassette as well as download.

Menswear played as part of the lineup at the Shiiine On Weekender festival (6–9 November 2015), playing alongside acts such as Happy Mondays, Peter Hook, The Wedding Present, 808 State and The Orb. This was to be the last gig the revamped line-up played, celebrating 20 years since the release of debut album Nuisance. In May 2016, Dean praised the then-current lineup of the band stating that "they're good boys and so far working with them has been very pleasant indeed. A lot of fun actually. It's strange, because that's new to me. Menswear rehearsals could be trying at best. I would spend quite a lot of time listening to various members bicker with each other. Quite often these altercations arose because one or two members didn't want to rehearse standing up. Absolutely true. Other problems involved the guitarists constantly turning up". However, in August 2016 Dean announced via the band's Twitter account that they were splitting up.

In 2020, Dean disowned the new lineup of Menswear, claiming "I was manipulated into something I wasn't comfortable with by people who were being opportunistic. I thought it'd be fun, but it looked weird, as I'm not that same person".

Dean then launched his new solo project Fxxk Explosion, releasing the In The Beginning EP in 2017.

=== The Menswear Collection (2020) ===
On 3 June 2020, Menswear announced the 23 October release of The Menswear Collection, a 4-CD box set spanning their entire career. Its contents include remastered versions of both Nuisance and ¡Hay Tiempo! (released for the first time outside of Japan), plus b-sides, demos and other rarities. As a precursor to the box set, the band also released “Wait for the Sun” from ¡Hay Tiempo! as a digital single.

Regarding how he felt about the box set, Dean remarked, "Strange, as I wouldn't have put the words 'Menswear' and 'box set' together. But I'm happy about it, because it'll surprise people how much music we actually recorded. I thought all those demos for ¡Hay Tiempo! were lost in an attic in Camden somewhere, but London Records had kept them all, even though they belonged to us". Dean also said although the original line-up of Menswear were all friends again, it would be unlikely for them to reform due to everyone having proper jobs, and that "that first Menswear album was about sounding like a teenage meltdown. It looks very different doing that in your '40s".

== Discography ==
Menswear discography
- Studio albums: 2
- Singles: 7

=== Studio albums ===
List of studio albums, with selected chart positions
Title	Album details	Peak chart positions	
Title	Album details	UK	JPN
Nuisance	Released: 24 October 1995; Label: Laurel (828 676 2); Format: CD, CS, DL, LP	11	25
¡Hay Tiempo!	Released: October 1998 (Japan only); Label: Polydor (POCP-7329); Format: CD	—	—
"—" denotes a release that did not chart or was not released in that territory.

=== Singles ===
List of singles, showing year released and album name
Title	Year	Peak chart positions	Album
Title	Year	UK	Album
"I'll Manage Somehow"	1995	49	Nuisance
"Daydreamer"	1995	14	Nuisance
"Stardust"	1995	16	Nuisance
"Sleeping In"	1995	24	Nuisance
"Being Brave"	1996	10	Nuisance
"We Love You"	1996	22	Non-album singles
"Crash '14"	2014	—	Non-album singles

== Band members ==
- Johnny Dean (born John Hutchinson Dean, 12 December 1971, Salisbury, Wiltshire, England) – vocals (1994–1998, 2013–2015)
- Chris Gentry (born 23 February 1977, Southend-on-Sea, Essex, England) – guitar (1994–1998)
- Simon White (born 10 July 1974, Moseley, Birmingham, England) – guitar (1994–1998)
- Stuart Black (born Stuart Lee Black, 1 April 1974, Walthamstow, London, England) – bass (1994–1998)
- Todd Parmenter – drums (1994)
- Matt Everitt (born Matthew Stephen Everitt, 13 September 1972, Sutton Coldfield, Warwickshire, England) – drums (1994–1996)
- Darren "Tud" Tudgay – drums (1996–1998)
- Paul Fletcher – keyboards (1996–1998)
