= Michael Laughton =

Professor

Michael Arthur Laughton (born 18 December 1934) is a British electrical engineer who is Emeritus Professor of Electrical Engineering at Queen Mary, University of London, and currently Visiting Professor at the Department of Environmental Science and Technology at Imperial College.

== Early life ==
He attended King Edward VI Five Ways, a grammar school in Birmingham, then moved to Canada. Laughton attended Etobicoke Collegiate Institute in Toronto, Ontario. At the University of Toronto, he gained a BASc in 1957. From the University of London, he gained a PhD in 1965 and a DSc (Eng) in 1976.

== Career ==
Laughton was formerly Pro-Principal of Queen Mary and Westfield College and Dean of Engineering of the University of London. Together with D. F. Warne, Laughton coedited a book, Electrical Engineer's Reference Book, by M. G. Say that is presently in its 16th edition.

As a Fellow of the Royal Academy of Engineering, Laughton is currently the UK representative on the Energy Committee of the European Council of Applied Sciences and Engineering (EuroCASE), a member of the energy and environment policy advisory groups of the Royal Academy of Engineering, the Royal Society and the Institution of Electrical Engineers, as well as the Power Industry Division Board of the Institution of Mechanical Engineers.

Laughton has acted as Specialist Adviser to UK Parliamentary Committees in both upper and lower Houses on alternative and renewable energy technologies and on energy efficiency. He put great emphasis on the fact that the United Kingdom is an island and therefore cannot rely significantly on imported energy.

Apart from participating in many international forums and writing many technical papers relating to the field of energy, Laughton has spent the last decade informally scouring Britain for out-of-the-way inventors. Part of Laughton's motivation is sheer Christian charity, but there's also a more fundamental message he wants to convey to his academic colleagues. He says, "The industrial revolution happened because of craftsmen-inventors... It did not spring from the minds of university-educated people. For too long have we worshipped at the altar of paper qualifications to the exclusion of a wider view. We must recognise the enormous value of the true innovator in effecting the technical changes in society which create real wealth."

== Personal life ==
He married Margaret Coleman in 1960. They divorced in 1994 and have two daughters and two sons.

== Academic qualification ==
- Royal Academy of Engineering
