= A Voyage Around the Queen =

Biography of Elizabeth II, written by Craig Brown

- Cover of UK hardback
- Author: Craig Brown
- Language: English
- Genre: Biography
- Publisher: Fourth Estate (UK); Farrar, Straus and Giroux (US)
- Publication date: 29 August 2024
- Pages: 672
- ISBN: 978-0008557492

A Voyage Around the Queen is a 2024 book on the life of Queen Elizabeth II, written by Craig Brown. It was published in the United States later in the same year as Q: A Voyage Around the Queen.

Writing for The Guardian, Stephen Smith called the book "a crown jewel among royal biographies", praising Brown's gift for vivid vignettes and revealing depth drawn from crowdsourced anecdotes—from courtiers to celebrities. Also writing for The Guardian, John Banville found it "an engrossing, comprehensive and gloriously bizarre portrait of the late monarch" and highlighted Brown's encyclopedic research and playful yet perceptive tone. Clare McHugh of The Washington Post pointed out the author's occasional tendency to dedicating too many pages to one topic but added that "Q: A Voyage Around the Queen remains absorbing, edifying and frequently laugh-out-loud funny". Writing for The Wall Street Journal, Dominic Green described the book as "cleverly constructed, consistently insightful and hilarious".
