= Ma'am Darling =

Biography of Princess Margaret, written by Craig Brown

Ma'am Darling: Ninety-Nine Glimpses of Princess Margaret
- Cover of 2017 UK hardback
- Author: Craig Brown
- Language: English
- Genre: Biography
- Publisher: Fourth Estate (UK); Farrar, Straus and Giroux (US)
- Publication date: 21 September 2017
- Pages: 432
- ISBN: 978-0008203610

Ma'am Darling: Ninety-Nine Glimpses of Princess Margaret is a 2017 book on the life of Princess Margaret, sister of Queen Elizabeth II, written by Craig Brown. It was published in the United States in 2018 as Ninety-Nine Glimpses of Princess Margaret.

The book consists of "essays, lists, catalogues, diaries, palace announcements, newspaper cuttings and interviews, as well as parodies".

The book won the 2018 James Tait Black Memorial Prize in the biography category.

Speaking in 2019, Princess Margaret's close friend and lady-in-waiting Anne Tennant, Baroness Glenconner, described Ma'am Darling as "that horrible book, we won't mention the name of the somebody who wrote it. I don't know why people want to rot her like that."
