= Nuisance (album) =

Studio album by Menswear
- Released: 24 October 1995
- Genre: Britpop
- Length: 48:54
- Label: Laurel/London
- Producer: Neill King

Menswear chronology
| Nuisance (1995) | ¡Hay Tiempo! (1998) |

Singles from Nuisance
- 1. "I'll Manage Somehow" Released: 3 April 1995; 2. "Daydreamer" Released: 19 June 1995; 3. "Stardust" Released: 18 September 1995; 4. "Sleeping In" Released: 27 November 1995; 5. "Being Brave" Released: 11 March 1996

Nuisance is the debut studio album by British rock band Menswear, released on 24 October 1995 by Laurel/London Records. The album was preceded by "I'll Manage Somehow", "Daydreamer" and "Stardust"; the former charted in the top fifty while the latter two charted in the top 20. The album peaked at number 11 on the UK Albums Chart.

== Production ==
All the material for Nuisance was written by Johnny Dean, Chris Gentry, Simon White, Matt Everitt and Stuart Black. The album was produced by Neill King.

== Release ==
Preceding the album, "I'll Manage Somehow" peaked at number 49 in the UK. This was followed up by "Daydreamer" and ""Stardust", charting at number 14 and number 16 respectively. Nuisance was released on 24 October 1995 by the label Laurel and peaked at number 11 on the UK Albums Chart. (Note: UK Laurel 828 676 2) "Sleeping In" reached number 24 and "Being Brave" charted at number 10.

== Reception ==
Professional ratings
Review scores
| Source | Rating |
|---|---|
| AllMusic | 4.5/5 stars |
| Smash Hits | 3/5 stars |

In a retrospective article about Britpop, Huffington Post writer Kayley Kravitz wrote that while Nuisance "stands up as a great Britpop record" it sound "[d]ated [...] but essential Britpop nonetheless."

== Track listing ==
All songs written by Johnny Dean, Chris Gentry, Simon White, Matt Everitt and Stuart Black.

1. "125 West 3rd Street" – 3:06
2. "I'll Manage Somehow" – 2:35
3. "Sleeping In" – 4:42
4. "Little Miss Pinpoint Eyes" – 2:07
5. "Daydreamer" – 2:16
6. "Hollywood Girl" – 2:18
7. "Being Brave" – 4:02
8. "Around You Again" – 3:23
9. "The One" – 3:43
10. "Stardust" – 2:55
11. "Piece of Me" – 3:03
12. "Stardust (reprise)" – 14:39
  Includes hidden track "Bones and Red Meat", which lasts for 3:20

== Personnel ==
- Johnny Dean – vocals
- Chris Gentry – guitar
- Simon White – guitar
- Stuart Black – bass
- Matt Everitt – drums
