= Daydreaming (disambiguation) =

Daydreaming is fantasizing while awake.

Daydreaming, Daydreamin', Day Dreaming or Day Dreamin' may also refer to:

== Albums ==
- Daydreamin' (Before Dark album), 2000
- Daydreamin' (Dynasty album), 1986
- Daydreaming (Morris Day album), 1987
- Daydreaming (Rafael Anton Irisarri album), 2007
- Day Dreamin', a 1977 album by Leslie Cheung
- The former name of Ariana Grande's debut album, Yours Truly

== Songs ==
- "Day Dreaming" (Aretha Franklin song), 1972
- "Day Dreaming" (DJ Drama song), 2009
- "Daydreaming" (Kid Sister song), 2010
- "Daydreamin'" (Lupe Fiasco song), 2006
- "Daydreaming" (Massive Attack song), 1990
- "Daydreaming" (Paramore song), a song by Paramore from their fourth album Paramore
- "Daydreaming" (Radiohead song), a 2016 song by Radiohead
- "Daydreamin'" (Tatyana Ali song), 1998
- "Daydreaming" (Tash Sultana and Milky Chance song), 2019
- "Daydreaming/Choose Me", a 2017 double single by Band-Maid
- "Daydreamin'", by Ariana Grande from Yours Truly
- "Daydreaming", by Ledisi from her twelfth studio album The Crown (2025)
- "Daydreamin'", by MC Solaar from Paradisiaque
- "Daydreaming", by Harry Styles from Harry's House
- "Daydreamin'", by Earth, Wind & Fire from Heritage
- "Daydreamin'", by George A. Robertson, Jr. from Scooby-Doo's Snack Tracks: The Ultimate Collection

== See also ==
- Daydream (disambiguation)
- Daydreamer (disambiguation)
