= Marcus Cunliffe =

British scholar in American studies (1922–1990)

Marcus Falkner Cunliffe (1922–1990) was a British scholar who specialized in cultural and military American Studies. He was particularly interested in comparing how Europeans viewed Americans and how Americans viewed Europeans.

== Biography ==
Cunliffe was born in Lancashire. He read history at Oriel College, Oxford and Sandhurst, and served in the British Army during World War II. From 1947 to 1949 he was at Yale, where he was Harkness Fellow. It was in the US that he met his first wife, Mitzi Solomon. They returned together in 1949 to the UK, where Cunliffe taught American history at the University of Manchester from 1949 to 1964. They were divorced in 1971. That same year Cunliffe married Lesley Hume. Their marriage was dissolved in 1980. From 1965 to 1980, Cunliffe was Professor of American Studies at the University of Sussex, which established the Cunliffe Centre in 1991. From 1980 Cunliffe was University Professor at George Washington University.

Cunliffe wrote or edited more than 15 books on history and literature. Cunliffe's best known early work was George Washington: Man and Monument, published in 1958. His papers are held at George Washington University's Special Collections Research Center, located in the Estelle and Melvin Gelman Library.

Cunliffe died of leukemia in Washington, D.C., on September 2, 1990.

== Works ==
- The American Presidency
- The Literature of the United States (1954)
- Marcus Cunliffe and Robin W. Winks, eds. Pastmasters: Some Essays on American Historians (1969)
- Marcus Cunliffe. Soldiers and Civilians: The Martial Spirit in America, 1775–1865 (1969).
- George Washington: Man and Monument (1958)
