= The Tony Years =

Book by Craig Brown

- First edition
- Author: Craig Brown
- Language: English
- Subject: Satirical Humour
- Publisher: Ebury Press
- Publication date: 14 June 2007
- Media type: Print (Hardback)
- Pages: 448
- ISBN: 978-0-09-190969-7
- OCLC: 70398923

The Tony Years is a book by British satirist, Craig Brown.

Ian Critchley of The Times said that "although the book lacks a coherent shape, it is full of comic gems."
