= Craig Brown =

Craig Brown may refer to:

- Craig Brown (footballer, born 1893) (1893–1963), Scottish footballer
- Craig Brown (footballer, born 1940) (1940–2023), Scottish footballer and manager
- Craig K. Brown (born c. 1946), American mayor of Galveston
- Craig Brown (New Zealand politician) (c. 1947–2020), New Zealand local-body politician
- Craig Brown (cricketer) (born 1954), Australian cricketer
- Craig Brown (satirist) (born 1957), British critic and satirist
- Craig Brown (footballer, born 1970), English footballer, see List of Bury F.C. players (1–24 appearances)
- Craig Brown (canoeist) (born 1971), British slalom canoer
- Craig Brown (footballer, born 1971), Scottish footballer
- Craig Brown (curler) (born 1975), American curler
- Craig Brown (taekwondo) (born 1983), English-Jamaican taekwondo practitioner
