= David Parsons (cricket coach) =

English cricket coach

David Parsons (born 26 December 1967 in Birmingham, Warwickshire) is a cricket coach who worked for the England and Wales Cricket Board (ECB) as national spin bowling coach and performance director. He is currently performance director of England Netball.

Parsons attended King Edward VI Five Ways Grammar School for Boys at Bartley Green in Birmingham, where he performed well at cricket and long distance running.

In 2000, Parsons joined the ECB as a national coach. In January 2006, he was appointed as the national spin bowling coach.

Parsons implemented the inaugural ECB spin bowling programme and has taken advice from Terry Jenner the man credited with the development of Shane Warne. He also visited the World Cricket Academy in Mumbai.

During the 2007 season Parsons organised two "spin camps" where young spin bowlers attended training sessions at the ECB performance centre in Loughborough. This involved spin bowling coaches developing the young bowlers whilst allowing young batsmen to face the spin bowlers and gain experience playing against them.

On 6 December 2007, Parsons was appointed ECB performance director replacing Peter Moores who was promoted to the role of England head coach. He held this position at the ECB until 2019.

In January 2021, Parsons began work as performance director at England Netball.
