= King Edward VI Five Ways School =

King Edward VI Five Ways

Location
- Scotland Lane; Bartley Green; Birmingham, West Midlands, B32 4BT; England; 52.43058°N 2.00143°W

Information
- Type: Grammar school; Academy
- Motto: Dieu et mon Droit
- Religious affiliation: Secular
- Established: 1883
- Founder: Edward VI
- Specialist: Humanities College; Science College
- Department for Education URN: 137046 Tables
- Ofsted: Reports
- Staff: 100 (approx.)
- Age: 11 to 18
- Enrolment: 1,300
- Houses: Barker; Dobinson; MacCarthy; Roach
- Colours: Black, White & Grey
- Alumni: Five Ways Old Edwardians
- Website: www.kefw.org

King Edward VI Five Ways (KEFW) is a selective co-educational state grammar school for ages 11–18 in Bartley Green, Birmingham, United Kingdom. One of the seven establishments of the Foundation of the Schools of King Edward VI, it is a voluntary aided school, with admission by highly selective examination. It was founded in Five Ways, Birmingham in 1883 and retained its name when it moved to Bartley Green in 1958. As of modern times, it requires the 11 plus exam to be taken to pass and have a place in the school.

== Background ==
It was first in the school league tables in 2007. Currently the school has 900 pupils in attendance amongst the lower school (years 7-11) and over 100 staff, many of whom are former pupils, as well as around 400 in the school's sixth form. The school is unique amongst the King Edward VI Foundation, being the only fully co-educational one. The school scored "good" in the latest Ofsted report in 2023. The school is Voluntary Aided. Parents are asked to make a voluntary contribution each year of around £30 per pupil to provide extras and benefits for all school pupils throughout the year. The school uses some unusual terminology, matching that of other Foundation schools, such as naming reading time "DEER" or naming homework "HIPPO", though not all teachers employ these terms.

== History ==
A 19th-century photograph of the school when it was at Five Ways island.

Established as a boys' school in 1883, part of the King Edward VI Foundation, the school's original building was that of the former Edgbaston Proprietary School, on Hagley Road at its junction with Ladywood Road, at Five Ways, approximately 1 mile south-west of Birmingham city centre. The school, designed by J.A. Chatwin was opened on 16 January 1883 by A. J. Mundella with provision for 350 boys the Headmaster being E.F.M. MacCarthy, formerly a master at the main King Edward's School. He remained in the post until retirement in 1916, and now has a building named after him at the Bartley Green site. Originally the school educated only up to age 16, Fifth Form, and to go to Oxbridge a pupil had to transfer to the main King Edward's School, at the time in New Street. However, MacCarthy's successor, Mr Barker, introduced a Sixth Form.

During the Second World War, the Headmaster at the time, Mr Dobinson, decided to evacuate the school to Monmouth, and the boys attended Monmouth School, the two staffs sharing the teaching. This meant that all the staff and pupils were lodged in the town, and could only keep in contact with family via correspondence; Mr Dobinson was able occasionally to visit Birmingham.

After the war the school was becoming overcrowded, but due to development around the school there was no opportunity to expand, so a new site was found. On 23 April 1958 the school opened at its current home in Bartley Green, a suburb on the extreme south-west of Birmingham. The new school was built on the site of the Bartley Farm, which had been purchased by the Foundation, next to Bartley Reservoir. The site was elevated, and in the winter a bleak place.

The relocation was not universally popular. The School Debating Society passed a motion regretting the move. Staff were concerned about the effect the relocation to such a distant suburb would have on the school's intake, which because of the central position had been drawn from the whole city; many boys who had joined the school at Five Ways, easily reached from all parts of the city, suddenly had considerably longer journeys to its new remote location. This undoubtedly affected admissions in later years. Then the school's corridors were considered too narrow especially around the original core block of the school, and whilst the playing fields were extensive the school buildings themselves were small and rather basic, with limited common areas.

Many additions have been made to the original 1958 buildings. These include a music block, a technology block, a sports hall and the MacCarthy Block. The Eyles Centre was built to house the school's Sixth Form. It has since been replaced by the Chowen Sixth Form Centre, and the Eyles Centre has been renovated to become a new music block. The old music building is now a large computer suite and staff offices. There has also been the expansion of the Science Wing, and increased seating capacity in the hall with an annex and balcony, as well as the Fitness Suite and extension to the art rooms in the MacCarthy Block. In recent years, a sports pavilion, a new astro turf playing field, a mobile classroom, a languages centre, and an Observatory have been built, the mobile classroom was rebuilt, the old mobile classroom (nicknamed 'the shed' by the pupils) was built in 2014 and was rebuilt in early 2024. They have also renovated many classrooms across the school, and replaced the old computers with newer versions.

Five Ways introduced computer technology in 1978, using a communications link to mainframe facilities at Aston University.

Girls have been admitted to Five Ways since 1988, first in the Sixth Form, then in the main school ten years later. Today Five Ways is the largest co-educational grammar school in the West Midlands, and one of the top five co-ed grammar schools nationally.

=== Headteachers ===
The school has had 12 Headmasters and 2 Headmistresses in its history.

1. Revd Egerton Francis Mead MacCarthy 1883 – 1916
2. Arthur Ernest Barker 1916 – 1933
3. Charles Henry Dobinson 1933 – 1945 (afterwards Reader in Education at Oxford University and Tutor in the University Department of Education)
4. Harry Robert Roach 1946 – 1951
5. Thomas Charles Burgess 1951 – 1963 (Oversaw move to Bartley Green; died in post)
6. Roland Mathias 1964 – 1969
7. Peter Rodney Watkins 1969 – 1974
8. Geoffrey Sanders 1974 – 1990
9. Revd John G. Knowles 1990 – 1999
10. Peter Limm 1999 – 2002
11. David Wheeldon 2002 – 2012
12. Yvonne Wilkinson 2012 – 2021
13. Charlotte M. Jordan 2021 – 2023
14. Dr Simon N Bird 2024 - current

Yvonne Wilkinson was Acting Headmistress from September to December 2002, the first Headmistress in the school's history, although as she served in an acting capacity for only one term it was not properly a Headmistresship. She returned as the first actual headmistress from the start of the 2012–2013 school year, after a headship at Gateways School, Leeds.

Linda Johnson was acting as Interim Headmistress since February 2023 as Charlotte Jordan left her role after releasing a list of striking staff to parents on 15 February, causing a data breach. Dr Simon N Bird, former Handsworth Grammar School headmaster, took leadership in early 2024. This is the first headmaster of Five Ways in 12 years.

== Entry ==
Pupils must pass an 11-plus entrance exam to get into the school. The entrance examination is tough and only 1 in 10 examinees are successful. The King Edward VI Foundation holds its exams at the same time, and generally a candidate will sit one exam for multiple schools within the foundation. Formerly 155 were selected from each year, from more than 1,500 candidates; with a few more accepted every year on appeal. From September 2014 the school increased its intake to 180 pupils in Year 7. A pupil has the opportunity to list the Foundation schools that he or she prefers, and depending on the results, may get allocated into one of the schools.

Students can also enter the school at sixth form level, with places awarded based on GCSE grades, requiring at least a 7 in any subject to be taken, 8 in Maths to take Further Maths, and a 6 in English and Maths if they do not already form part of the offer. Places are highly competitive with students applying from all over Birmingham and the surrounding areas. There are approximately 50 external candidates in each year. Pupils studying at the school in the lower years must get an additional four 7s (or five 8s if they wish to take four A-levels). The Sixth Form has approximately 210 students in each L6 and U6.

== Subjects offered ==
At GCSE, students are obliged to choose at least one humanities subject between History and Geography, at least one foreign language (options include French, German, Latin and Spanish), and other traditional subjects such as Biology, Chemistry and Physics (can be separated into either Combined or Triple/Single Science), Maths, English Language, English Literature and Religious Studies. Other options include: Music, Art, Drama, Food Preparation and Nutrition, Design and Technology, Physical Education, Computer Science and OSLA (Outdoor Skills Leadership and Adventure) which is a school funded option and does not count as a GCSE but does provide awards including the Climbing NICAS Award, the BCU Star Awards, Advanced First Aid Qualifications and the Duke of Edinburgh Bronze Award.

Previously, 4 subjects were picked at AS Level. However, from 2017 students are now expected to choose three subjects to complete at A Level and to complete an Extended Project Qualification. Options exclusive to A Level studies are: Business, Economics, Government & Politics, Law, Classical Civilisation, Sport Studies, Psychology, Sociology and Philosophy as well as courses from down the school. There is also a Further Maths option, which enables a candidate to take two A Levels, one in Mathematics, one in Further Maths, over the two years. From 2013, the school no longer offers IB courses. Candidates taking four A-levels are not allowed to complete an Extended Project Qualification.

The International Baccalaureate took its first cohort of students in 2011. For the first 2-year course a variety of SL and HL subjects have been offered along with TOK (Theory of Knowledge). Subjects World Literature and Mathematics are compulsory but are at SL and HL. One subject from Biology, Chemistry or Physics must be chosen at SL or HL. One subject from History, Geography or Economics must be chosen at SL or HL. One subject from French, Spanish, German (and hopefully in the future Mandarin and Latin) at ab initio [from scratch] level, SL or HL. One more option is fulfilled by a science, humanities or foreign language option or the choice of Visual Arts at SL or HL. In March 2013 prospective students were informed that the International Baccalaureate will no longer be offered due to lack of interest and applications from internal Year 11 students who wished to stay on the next year, and timetable and staffing constraints. The school now offers the English Baccalaureate (Ebacc) which is a nationwide GCSE achievement.

== International links ==
School	City
Tanzania: Babati Day Secondary School	Babati
China: The English School	Guangzhou
Japan: Okazaki High School	Okazaki, Aichi
King Edward Public School	Mahilpur
New Zealand: Christchurch Boys' High School	Christchurch
South Africa: Afri-Twin Link	Cape Town
France: St Just School	Lyon
USA: EDGE partnership link with group of schools in Chicago	Chicago
Iceland: Brekkuskoli School	Akureyri

== Five Ways Old Edwardians ==
Notable alumni include:

- Richard Adams - Fair Trade pioneer
- Mark Aldred – Olympic rower
- Arun Arora - Anglican priest and former Director of Communications of the Church of England
- Kate Ashfield - actress
- Prof Michael Beesley CBE, Professor of Economics 1965–90 at the London Business School
- Peter Bennett, 1st Baron Bennett of Edgbaston OBE, Conservative MP for Birmingham Edgbaston 1940–53, and President of the British Productivity Council 1955-57
- Jon Burgerman - artist
- Tom Butler - Bishop of Southwark
- Prof Sir David Cannadine - historian
- Sir Michael Checkland - Director General of the BBC 1987-92, Chairman of the Higher Education Funding Council for England (HEFCE) 1997-2001
- Jodie Cook, entrepreneur
- John Copley, opera director
- Sir Guy Dain, Chairman of the British Medical Association (BMA) 1942-48
- Nigel Dakin - CMG, Governor of the Turks and Caicos Islands, career Diplomat and soldier.
- Nathaniel Dass - Actor, singer and musician.
- Oscar Deutsch - founder of Odeon Cinemas
- Keith Fielding - international Rugby Union and Rugby League player
- Geoffrey Filkin, Baron Filkin CBE, Chief Executive of Reading Borough Council 1988–91, former husband of Elizabeth Filkin
- Daniel Fox - Olympic field hockey player
- Anisa Haghdadi - social entrepreneur
- Charles Hare - tennis player - represented Great Britain in the 1937 Davis Cup
- Martha Howe-Douglas - actress
- Geoffrey Jones - Professor at the Harvard Business School and business historian
- John Kenneally V.C. (born Leslie Robinson)
- Prof Michael Laughton, Professor of Electrical Engineering at Queen Mary, University of London 1977–2000
- Joe Lycett - comedian
- Prof Raymond Lyttleton FRS, Professor of Theoretical Astronomy at the University of Cambridge 1969–78, presenter in 1956 of the BBC's The Modern Universe (a precursor to The Sky at Night)
- Mazher Mahmood - The "Fake Sheikh" journalist
- David Maloney - former BBC television director and producer
- Simon Morgan - former Leicester City F.C. and Fulham F.C. footballer
- David Parsons - England cricket coach
- Tom Parsons - international sportsman
- Rahul Potluri - doctor, researcher, scientist and Founder of ACALM
- Paul Ready - actor
- Alex Smith - won "The Wolfram 2,3 Turing Machine Research Prize"
- Frederick Stratton FRS OBE, Professor of Astrophysics at the University of Cambridge 1928–47, President of the Royal Astronomical Society 1933-35, Director of the Solar Physics Observatory 1928-47
- Ini-Abasi Umotong, footballer
- Ben Wright - BBC political correspondent
