= One Two Three Four: The Beatles in Time =

2020 non-fiction book by Craig Brown

- Author: Craig Brown
- Language: English
- Subject: The Beatles
- Genre: Biography
- Publisher: 4th Estate
- Publication date: 10 April 2020
- Media type: Print (hardback & paperback)
- Pages: 656
- ISBN: 978-0-00-834000-1

One Two Three Four: The Beatles in Time is a non-fiction book written by satirist Craig Brown about the English rock band the Beatles. The book was published by 4th Estate on 10 April 2020, coinciding with the 50th anniversary of the announcement of the group's break-up.

== Reception ==
=== Critical reception ===
Anthony Quinn of The Guardian called the book "not a biography so much as a group portrait in vignettes, a rearrangement of stories and legends whose trick is to make them gleam anew", and noted that it "does an intriguing sideline in characters who were tangential to the Beatles' story", such as Richard and Margaret Asher (whose daughter Jane was a girlfriend of Beatle Paul McCartney), drummer Jimmie Nicol, and former police constable Eric Clague.

Nuala McCann of The Irish News wrote: "Craig Brown's rollicking roll back in time is worth a listen just to wonder at the things people do in the name of fandom and to feed that little twinge of nostalgia sweet and tender as the first bite of the madeleine."

"More than just a nostalgic hagiography, Brown succeeds in "putting the Beatles in their place as well as their time," Dominic Green wrote in Literary Review, as the book reveals how "the exceptional strangeness of The Beatles reflects the ordinary oddity of real life." Green called it "by far the best book anyone has written about them and the closest we can get to the truth."

Esquire's Alex Bilmes wrote that "Brown hits all the beats you might expect from a Beatles biography, from jagged first stabs through the swelling roar of the Beatles' imperial phase to the sour diminuendo of the band's dissolution. But he places at least as much emphasis on what may seem inessential, tangential, ephemeral, as he does on the big stuff." Bilmes concludes that the book is "a tragicomedy. Both dark and sunny, like a Lennon/McCartney song."

=== Honours ===
The book won the 2020 Baillie Gifford Prize for Non-Fiction. Journalist Martha Kearney, who served as one of the judges that year, called it "a profound book about success and failure which won the unanimous support of our judges. Craig Brown has reinvented the art of biography [...] The idea of there being a fresh book about the Beatles is quite hard to imagine as there is so much written about them—but it is such an original book". The book was chosen by comedian and TV host Griff Rhys Jones for Sara Cox's talk show Between the Covers.
