= Michael Beesley =

British industrial economist (1924–1999)

Michael Edwin Beesley CBE (3 July 1924 – 24 September 1999) was a British industrial economist and briefly a Liberal Party politician.

== Early life and education ==
He was a son of Edwin and Kathleen Beesley. He was educated at King Edward VI Five Ways School, Birmingham, and Birmingham University. In 1947 he married Eileen Eleanor Yard. They had two daughters and three sons. In 1985 he was appointed a CBE.

== Professional career ==
He became a research associate at Birmingham University in April 1947. In 1948 he undertook work on the economics side under the direction of Mr. Clive Williams for the Abercrombie-Jackson Town and Country Survey. He then resumed work at the university, where he was a member of the junior staff. He founded the Beesley lectures, an annual series of lectures on economic regulation.

== Political career ==
He was the Liberal candidate for Birmingham King's Norton at the 1950 general election. He did not stand for parliament again.
