= The Montrose Avenue =

British rock band formed in 1996 that were based in Wokingham, Berkshire

- Thirty Days Out album cover

Background information
- Origin: Wokingham, Berkshire, England
- Genres: British rock
- Years active: 1996–1999
- Past members: Robert Lindsey-Clark; Scott James; Paul Williams; James Taylor; Matt Everitt

The Montrose Avenue were a British rock band, formed in 1996 and were based in Wokingham, Berkshire. The group were composed of lead singer and guitarist Robert Lindsey-Clark, pianist, guitarist and vocalist Scott James, vocalist and guitarist Paul Williams, bassist James Taylor and drummer Matt Everitt who left Menswear to join the group.

James and Williams met at school in Reading, and first performed together as a duo covering material by the Byrds and Moby Grape. They met Lindsey-Clark at a folk club and the trio formed Montrose Avenue in 1996. Taylor and Everitt then completed the line-up and signed a recording contract with Columbia Records the following year. The limited edition She's Looking for Me EP, released in 1997, charted at No. 118 in the UK singles chart. This was then followed by their first mainstream single in March 1998, in which "Where Do I Stand" proved to be their only top 40 hit, charting at No. 38. "Shine" then followed up three months later charting at No. 59, before their final single "Start Again" released in October, charted at No. 58.

Their only album, Thirty Days Out, was released a week after the release of "Start Again" on 12 October 1998 before charting at number 102 in the UK and at number 69 in Japan. Despite establishing a cult following in the Far East, the Montrose Avenue never released another album only to disband in 1999.

After the Montrose Avenue disbanded, James went on to work with Welsh rock band Stereophonics as a touring guitarist between 2001–2004, while also appearing in the band's music videos "Have a Nice Day" and "Step on My Old Size Nines". Everitt worked as a music journalist, before moving into radio, starting at London-based rock station XFM, then moving to BBC 6 Music where he is currently a DJ and music reporter.

== Discography ==
=== Album ===
- Thirty Days Out (1998) – UK No. 102, Japan No. 69

=== Singles and EPs ===
- She's Looking for Me EP (1997) – UK No. 88
- "Where Do I Stand" (1998) – UK No. 38
- "Shine" (1998) – UK No. 59
- "Start Again" (1998) – UK No. 58

== Former members ==
- Robert Lindsey-Clark – guitar, lead vocals
- Scott James – piano, guitar, vocals
- Paul Williams – guitar, vocals
- James Taylor – bass
- Matt Everitt – drums
- Robert Gillibrand – drums
- Lewis Henderson – keyboards, guitar
