= Daydreamer (video game) =

2015 action video game

- Developer: Roland Studios
- Publisher: Atlus (PS4)
- Platforms: Microsoft Windows, PlayStation 4
- Release: WW: August 21, 2015; Awakened Edition; PlayStation 4: WW: July 12, 2016
- Genre: Side-scrolling video game
- Mode: Single-player

Daydreamer is a video game developed by Roland Studios.

== Plot ==
In a distant future where the world has been taken over by aliens and undergoing a civil war, a young girl called Olivia must rescue her brother from the aliens.

== Gameplay ==
Weapons at the players disposal include laser guns and flamethrowers. The player also has pets to assist them in tasks. The player encounters large bosses. The game is a side scroller.

== Development ==
Daydreamer was showcased at the Moscone Center’s GDC Play Area at the 2015 Game Developer Conference. It had an unsuccessful crowdfunding campaign.

Daydreamer has Sprite graphics, of rather high quality for its characters, contrasted by a lot of scrolling check patterns for its pause menu. It also features an interface designed for a gamepad, to the point where the game only displays gamepad inputs for menus and tutorial messages even when played only a keyboard on Windows.

== Reception ==
Reception

Aggregate score
Aggregator	Score
Metacritic	68/100 (PS4)

Review score
Publication	Score
Hardcore Gamer	3.5/5

Daydreamer received a score of 68/100 on Metacritic for the PlayStation 4 version of the game, indicating "mixed or average" reviews.

Hardcore Gamer gave the PlayStation 4 version of the game a 3.5/5, praising the art style and how it pays homage to platform games from the 1990s.
