= Batteries Not Included (TV series) =

- Presented by: John Cleese
- Country of origin: United Kingdom
- No. of series: 1
- No. of episodes: 6

Production
- Running time: 40 minutes (including adverts)

Original release
- Network: Dave
- Release: 30 October – 4 December 2008

Batteries Not Included is a British comedy programme showcasing the world's strangest gadgets. It was broadcast on Dave who commissioned the show. It was made by independent production company Liberty Bell. John Cleese hosted with Phill Jupitus narrating. The programme featured a rotating panel of contributing celebrities (mainly comedians) who tested out the gadgets and brought on their own favourite gadgets to discuss.
