= Johnny Dean =

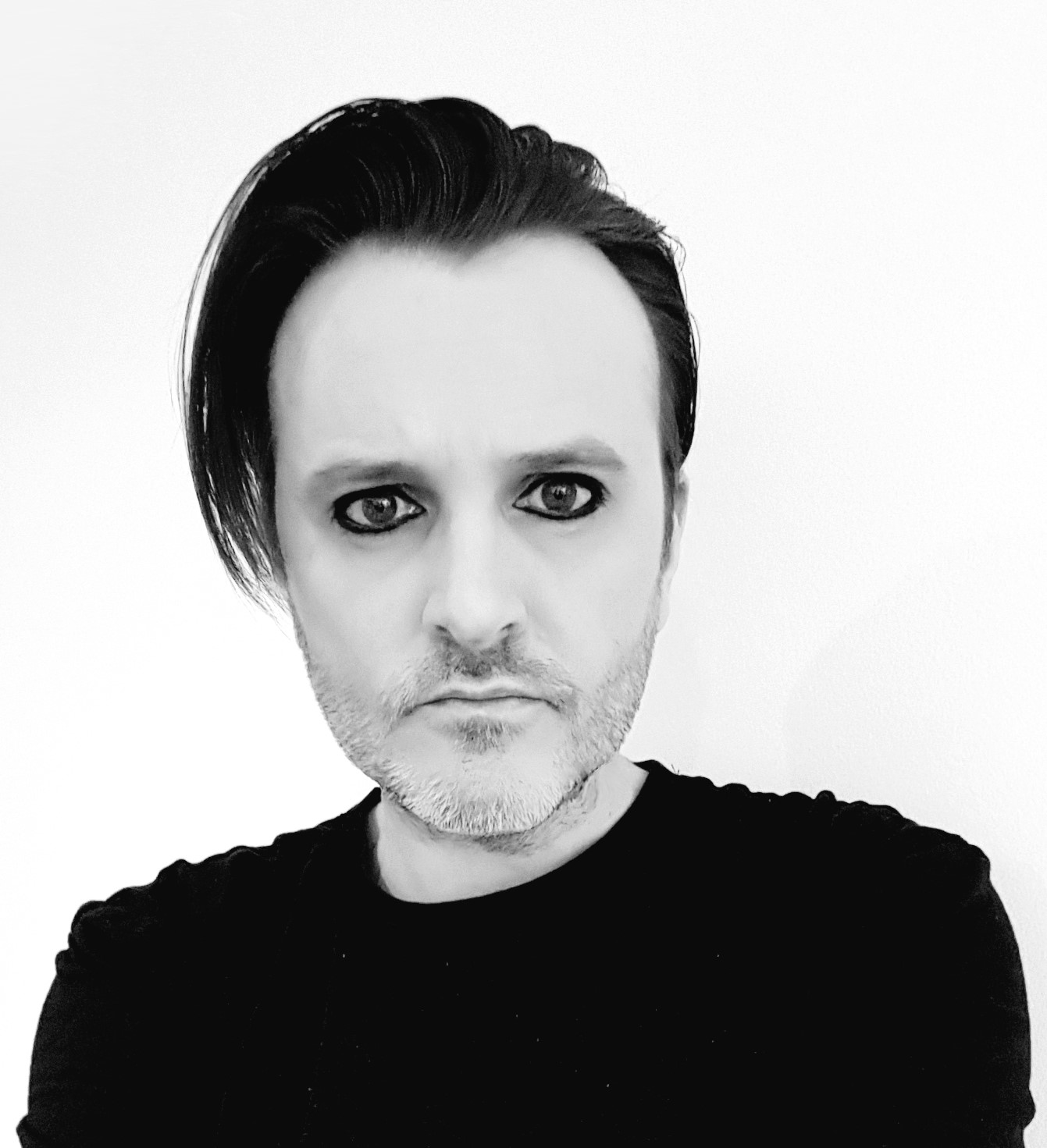
- Dean photographed in 2017

Background information
- Born: John Hutchinson Dean; 12 December 1971 (age 54); Salisbury, England
- Genres: Britpop, synthpop, country
- Occupations: Singer, musician, songwriter, artist, writer, activist
- Instrument: Vocals
- Years active: 1993–present
- Labels: London Records, Laurel, Polydor
- Member of: Fxxk Explosion
- Formerly of: Menswear
- Website: menswearband.com fxxkexplosion.com

Johnny Dean (born John Hutchinson Dean; 12 December 1971) is an English musician. He was the frontman of Menswear and is currently working on a solo synthpop project called Fxxk Explosion.

== Early years, Menswear ==
Born to a Royal Air Force father in Salisbury, Wiltshire, Dean had a nomadic upbringing throughout the UK and Europe, followed by a brief period at art school, before becoming visible in the early 1990s Britpop scene. He was first featured in Pulp's "Do You Remember the First Time?" music video, and in an article in Select magazine about the mod-inspired club scene.

He was a founder member of Menswear alongside Stuart Black in 1994; between then and 1998, when the band dissolved, they scored a number of UK Top 40 singles. He then formed Messiah with Black, a line-up which lasted until 2000. Dean was the subject of a track by Art Brut called "I Wanna Be Johnny Dean" and numerous comic strips in music publications. As frontman of Menswear he toured worldwide, had several appearances on Top of the Pops, and was featured on magazine covers and centrefold pinups throughout the 1990s.

== After diagnosis (2009–present) ==
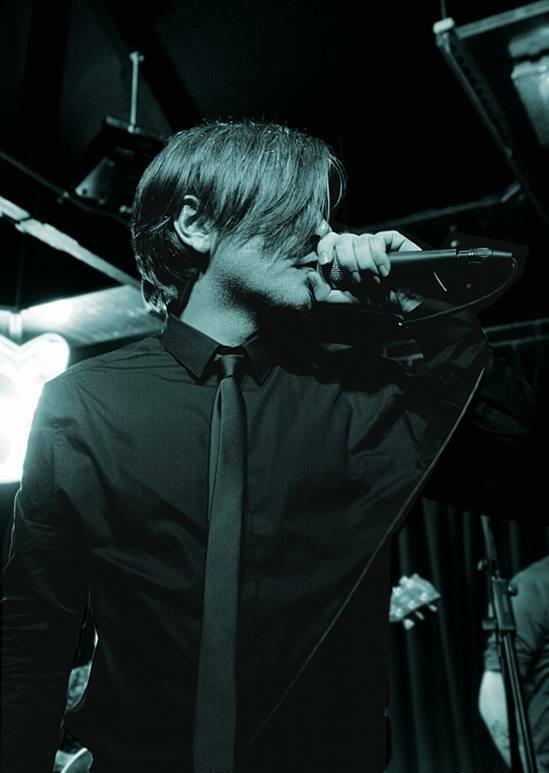
Dean at a Menswear show in 2013

Dean was diagnosed with pervasive developmental disorder in 2009 and has started campaigning on behalf of the National Autistic Society. In recent interviews, Dean has expressed the torment he experienced before his diagnosis, and his desire to raise awareness of the autism spectrum.

On Friday 7 June 2013, Dean made his first sold-out live appearance in 15 years with the Nuis@nce Band performing the songs of David Bowie to raise funds for The National Autistic Society in London.

A new Menswear line-up played their first show in 15 years on 16 August 2013; original member Dean was joined by members of The Nuisance Band. The sold-out event was in aid of the mental health charity PMA Sport's Academy and #TimeToChange campaign which Johnny Dean was invited to promote alongside The Saturdays' Frankie Sandford, Uri Geller and Ruby Wax.
