= Craig Brown (satirist) =

English critic and satirist (born 1957)

- Born: 23 May 1957 (age 69); Hayes, West London
- Education: Eton
- Alma mater: University of Bristol
- Occupations: Journalist, writer, satirist, biographer
- Spouse: Frances Welch
- Children: 2

Craig Edward Moncrieff Brown (born 23 May 1957) is an English critic and satirist, best known for parliamentary sketch writing, humorous articles and parodies for newspapers and magazines including The Times, the Daily Mail and Private Eye.

== Life and career ==
Brown was educated at Eton and the University of Bristol and then became a freelance journalist in London, contributing to Harper's & Queen (collaborating with Lesley Cunliffe on articles, some of which resulted in books), Tatler, The Spectator, The Times Literary Supplement, Literary Review, the Evening Standard (as a regular columnist), The Times (notably as parliamentary sketchwriter; these columns were compiled into a book called A Life Inside) and The Sunday Times (as TV and restaurant critic). He later continued his restaurant column in The Sunday Telegraph and has contributed a weekly book review to The Mail on Sunday. He created the characters of "Bel Littlejohn", an ultra-trendy New Labour type, in The Guardian, and "Wallace Arnold", an extremely reactionary conservative, in The Independent on Sunday. In 2001, he took over Auberon Waugh's "Way of the World" in The Daily Telegraph following Waugh's death, but lost the column in December 2008. He also has a column in the Daily Mail.

Brown also writes comedy shows such as Norman Ormal for TV (in which he appeared as a returning officer) and his radio show This Is Craig Brown was broadcast on BBC Radio 4 in 2004. It featured comics Rory Bremner and Harry Enfield and other media personalities. He has appeared on television as a critic on BBC Two's Late Review as well as in documentaries such as Russell Davies's life of Ronald Searle.

His book 1966 and All That takes its title, and some other elements, from 1066 and All That, extending its history of Britain through to the beginning of the 21st century. A BBC Radio 4 adaptation followed in September 2006, in similar vein to This Is Craig Brown. The Tony Years is a comic overview of the years of Tony Blair's government, published in paperback by Ebury Press in June 2007.

Brown's predominantly factual biography of Princess Margaret, Countess of Snowdon, Ma'am Darling: 99 Glimpses of Princess Margaret, was published in 2017 and won the 2018 James Tait Black Memorial Prize in the biography category.

In 2020, Brown's book One Two Three Four: The Beatles in Time won the £50,000 Baillie Gifford Prize for Non-Fiction. In announcing the award, Martha Kearney, the chair of the judging panel, described the book as "a joyous, irreverent, insightful celebration of the Beatles, a highly original take on familiar territory. [...] It's also a profound book about success and failure which won the unanimous support of our judges. Craig Brown has reinvented the art of biography".

Brown wrote an essay, The Slippery Art of Biography, for the Times Literary Supplement in 2021 and presented it at the Edinburgh International Book Festival the following year.

== Personal life ==
Brown's wife is the author Frances Welch, daughter of the journalist Colin Welch. They have two children. Frances Welch's niece is the singer Florence Welch of Florence and the Machine.

== Bibliography ==
=== Books ===
- 1981 – The Dirty Bits (Deutsch, ISBN 0233973958)
- 1983 – The Book of Royal Lists (Simon & Schuster, ISBN 0671472828)
- 1984 – The Marsh–Marlowe Letters: The correspondence of Gerald Marsh and Sir Harvey Marlowe (Heinemann, ISBN 0-434-08885-4)
- 1993 – Craig Brown's Greatest Hits (Century, ISBN 0-7126-5783-5)
- 1994 – The Hounding of John Thomas, a sequel to Lady Chatterley's Lover (Century, ISBN 0-7126-5778-9)
- 1998 – Hug Me While I Weep for I Weep for the World, by "Bel Littlejohn" (Little, Brown, ISBN 0-316-64716-0)
- 1998 – The Little Book of Chaos (Time Warner, ISBN 0-7515-2657-6)
- 1999 – The Great Mortdecai Moustache Mystery by Kyril Bonfiglioli, completed by Craig Brown (Black Spring Press, ISBN 0-948238-24-0)
- 2003 – This Is Craig Brown (Ebury Press, ISBN 0-09-188807-7)
- 2004 – Craig Brown's 'Imaginary Friends': The Collected Parodies 2000–2004 (Private Eye, ISBN 1-901784-37-1)
- 2005 – 1966 and All That (Hodder & Stoughton, ISBN 0-340-89711-2)
- 2006 – The Tony Years (Ebury Press, ISBN 978-0-09-190970-3)
- 2010 – The Lost Diaries (Fourth Estate, ISBN 978-0-00-736060-4)
- 2012 – One on One (Fourth Estate, ISBN 9780007360642)
- 2017 – Ma'am Darling: 99 Glimpses of Princess Margaret (Fourth Estate, ISBN 978-0008203610)
- 2020 – One Two Three Four: The Beatles in Time (Fourth Estate, ISBN 978-0008340001)
- 2022 – Haywire: The Best of Craig Brown (HarperCollins Publishers ISBN 9780008557485)
- 2024 – A Voyage Around the Queen (Fourth Estate, ISBN 978-0008557492)

=== Book reviews ===
Year	Review article	Work(s) reviewed
2018	Brown, Craig (22 February 2018). "Doing the New York hustle". The New York Review of Books. 65 (3): 37–39.	Brown, Tina. The Vanity Fair diaries : 1983–1992. Henry Holt.
