= Norman Ormal =

Knowledge is power

Norman Ormal was a 1998 political satire scripted by Craig Brown in which Harry Enfield played a former Conservative MP who became a Blair advisor.
