= St Mary's Catholic High School, Astley =

Catholic secondary school in Astley, Greater Manchester

St Mary's Catholic High School

Location
- Manchester Road; Astley, Greater Manchester, M29 7EE; England; 53.49507°N 2.46463°W

Information
- Type: Voluntary aided school
- Motto: Let all that you do, be done in love
- Religious affiliation: Catholic Church
- Established: 1961 (boys' provision)
- Local authority: Wigan
- Department for Education URN: 106538 Tables
- Ofsted: Reports
- Head teacher: Denise Brahms
- Gender: Co-educational
- Age: 11 to 18
- Enrolment: 1,537 (2026)
- Capacity: 1,569
- Website: www.stmaryschs.org.uk

St Mary's Catholic High School, also known as St Mary's Catholic High School and Sixth Form College, is a Roman Catholic secondary school and sixth form in Astley, in the Metropolitan Borough of Wigan, Greater Manchester, England.

The school is a mixed, non-selective voluntary aided school educating pupils aged 11 to 18. It is administered by Wigan Metropolitan Borough Council and is within the Roman Catholic Archdiocese of Liverpool.

The school is located on Manchester Road in Astley, between Leigh and Tyldesley. Its current headteacher is Denise Brahms.

== History ==
=== Establishment ===
The origins of St Mary's Catholic High School date to the early 1960s, during the reorganisation of Catholic secondary education in the Leigh and Astley area.

According to the published history of Twelve Apostles' Catholic Primary School in Leigh, the boys' school at St Mary's opened in 1961, followed shortly afterwards by the girls' school. By 1962, secondary-age pupils from Twelve Apostles were transferring to St Mary's.

The school subsequently became a coeducational Catholic comprehensive school. The precise date of this transition has not been established.

=== Development ===
By May 2000, St Mary's was an established mixed comprehensive school for pupils aged 11 to 18, including a sixth form. An Ofsted inspection recorded 1,679 pupils, including 238 sixth form students. The headteacher was A. E. Bell.

In September 2004, the school was awarded specialist Mathematics and Computing College status. An Ofsted inspection in June 2006 reported that the designation had supported improvements in mathematics teaching and links with local primary schools.

D. W. Burnett was headteacher at the time of the 2006 and 2009 inspections. In February 2009, the school had 1,620 pupils, including 313 students in its sixth form.

Andrew Dawson served as headteacher during the 2010s, including at the time of the school's June 2019 Catholic inspection.

Denise Brahms subsequently became headteacher and was identified in that position in Ofsted's October 2024 inspection.

=== Buildings and facilities ===
The school occupies a site on Manchester Road in Astley. Its buildings and educational accommodation have undergone improvements since the early 2000s.

The school has described a roof and window replacement programme costing more than £1 million, funded through capital arrangements involving the Archdiocese of Liverpool.

The school facilities include a chapel, library, sports hall, gymnasium, artificial-turf football pitch, dance studio and drama theatre.

== Governance and Catholic character ==
St Mary's is a voluntary aided Catholic school associated with the Archdiocese of Liverpool. The school's governing body is responsible for its governance, working within the statutory framework for voluntary aided schools.

The school's mission statement is "Let all that you do, be done in love". Its Catholic character is reflected in religious education, collective worship, chaplaincy and charitable activities.

=== Chaplaincy and worship ===
The school has a chapel and provides opportunities for Catholic worship, including Masses, celebrations of the Word and prayer.

Its chaplaincy programme involves pupils in liturgical activities, charitable work and wider school life. A full-time lay chaplain joined the school in June 2024.

The school also maintains a chaplaincy space known as the Nazareth Room, which is used for meetings, prayer and chaplaincy activities.

=== Catholic Social Teaching ===
Catholic Social Teaching is incorporated into the school's religious and personal development programmes.

The school participates in charitable activities including the CAFOD Big Lent Walk, Reverse Advent Calendar and fundraising events for local and national causes.

Tutor groups are associated with patrons drawn from Catholic religious traditions and figures associated with social justice.

== Curriculum ==
The school provides education across Key Stage 3 and Key Stage 4, including courses leading to GCSE qualifications.

Subjects include English, mathematics, science, religious education, history, geography, modern foreign languages, computing, business studies, art, design and technology, drama, music and physical education.

The school also delivers personal, social, health and economic education, relationships education and careers education through its personal development curriculum.

=== Religious education ===
Religious education is a compulsory component of the curriculum.

At GCSE level, pupils follow the Eduqas Route B Religious Studies syllabus. This includes Catholic theology and the study of Judaism.

Religious education continues in the sixth form through the school's Theology in Action programme, which includes religious, ethical and social themes.

== Sixth Form College ==
The school operates a mixed sixth form providing education for students in Years 12 and 13.

Its post-16 curriculum includes A Level courses, Level 3 vocational qualifications and a one-year Level 2 pathway.

Students can study combinations of academic and vocational subjects. Additional qualifications and learning opportunities include the Extended Project Qualification, Core Mathematics and GCSE English and mathematics resit programmes.

In October 2024, Ofsted recorded 258 students in the school's sixth form.

=== Progression and careers ===
The sixth form provides careers education and guidance relating to university admissions, apprenticeships, training and employment.

Its Futures Programme includes university-related activities, careers support and preparation for post-18 progression.

== Confucius Classroom ==
St Mary's hosts a Confucius Classroom offering Chinese language teaching and cultural education.

According to the school, the programme was established on 12 December 2008 in partnership with Xi'an Bo-Ai International School, having previously operated at Wigan & Leigh College.

The classroom provides Mandarin teaching, including GCSE Chinese, and activities involving Chinese calligraphy, arts, culture and language.

It also undertakes outreach activities involving local primary schools and community organisations.

Events marking the tenth anniversary of the programme took place across the Wigan area during 2018 and 2019.

== Extracurricular activities ==
The school provides extracurricular activities covering sport, music, performing arts, academic interests and personal development.

These include school sports teams, musical activities, drama productions, clubs and educational visits.

An Ofsted inspection in October 2024 reported examples of older pupils running activities for younger pupils, including a boys' choir organised by Year 11 pupils and a school production directed by sixth form students.

=== Duke of Edinburgh's Award ===
St Mary's participates in the Duke of Edinburgh's Award scheme.

The school offers Bronze Award activities to pupils in Year 9 and Silver Award opportunities to students in Year 12. Participants undertake volunteering, physical activities, skills development and expeditions.

=== Pupil leadership ===
The school maintains a pupil leadership programme involving pupils from different year groups.

Leadership roles include head pupils, deputy head pupils and participation in student committees. Pupils also contribute to chaplaincy and charitable activities.

Ofsted's 2024 inspection highlighted the involvement of student committees in school improvement, including a pupil-led campaign to reduce litter on the school site.

== Inspections ==
=== Ofsted ===
St Mary's is inspected by Ofsted. Inspection records include inspections in January 1996 and May 2000.

The school was judged Good following an inspection in June 2006.

In February 2009, it received an Outstanding overall effectiveness judgement.

Subsequent inspections in March 2015 and November 2016 judged the school as Requires Improvement.

Following an inspection in April 2019, the school was judged Good.

An ungraded inspection took place on 8 and 9 October 2024. Inspectors concluded that the school had taken effective action to maintain the standards identified at the previous inspection.

The 2024 report recognised developments in curriculum provision, reading support, careers education and pupil leadership, while identifying areas for improvement relating to attendance and the use of assessment information. No new overall effectiveness judgement was awarded.

=== Catholic school inspections ===
In addition to Ofsted, St Mary's is subject to inspection of its Catholic character, religious education and collective worship on behalf of the Archdiocese of Liverpool.

A diocesan inspection took place on 4 and 5 June 2014.

A subsequent Section 48 inspection was undertaken on 27 June 2019 by Deacon Paul Mannings and Barbara Melia.

The inspection judged the overall effectiveness of the school's Catholic education as Good. The report also identified outstanding features of the school's Catholic life and provision.

Ofsted's October 2024 inspection report confirmed that the school's most recent Section 48 inspection had been undertaken in June 2019, with another Catholic inspection due before August 2027.

== Notable former pupils ==
- Sarah Baxendale – actress.
- Ciarán Griffiths – actor.
- Steven Mullaney – former professional cricketer.
