= Matt Everitt =

English drummer, producer and radio presenter

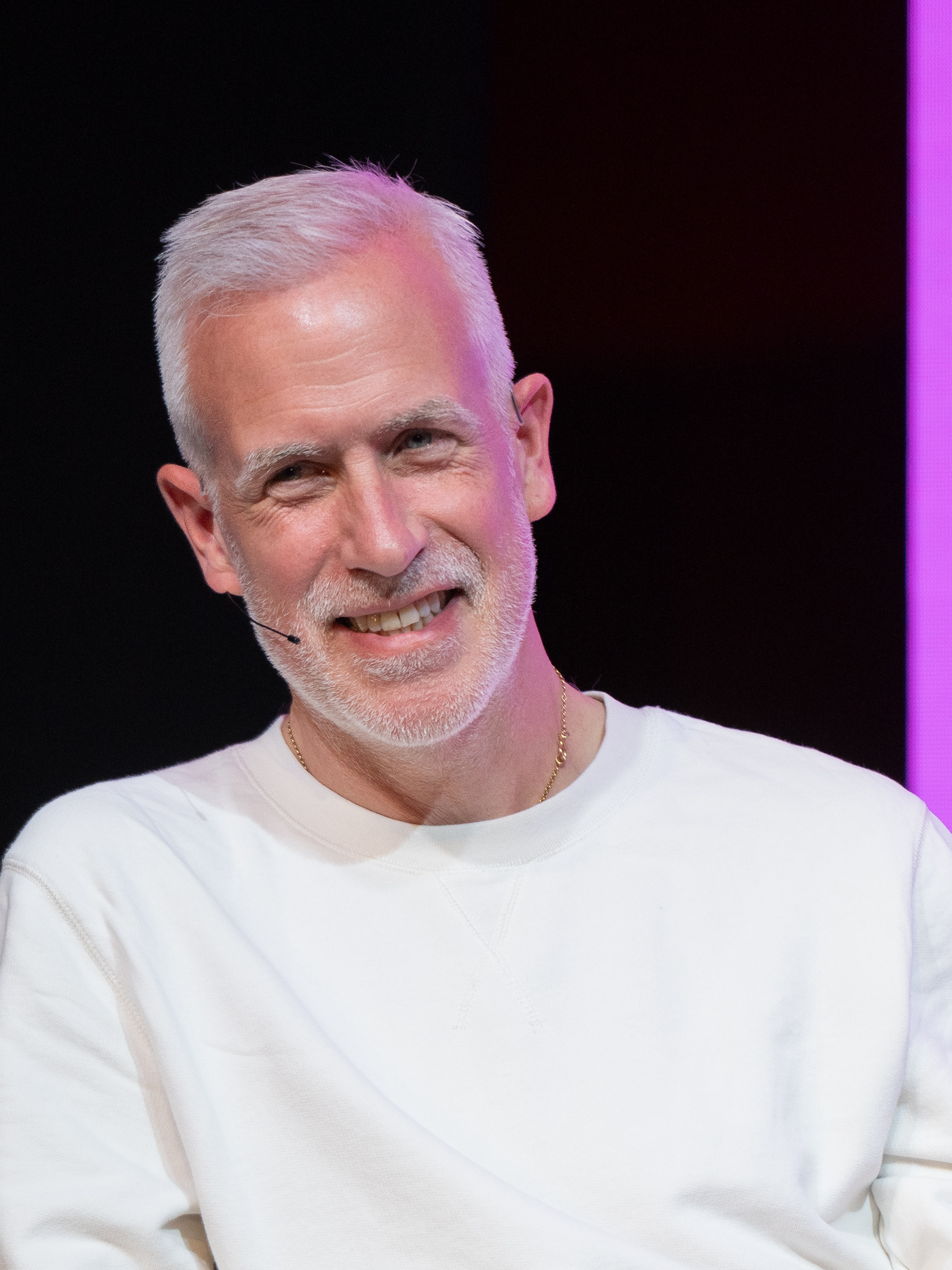
- Everitt at SXSW London, June 2025
- Born: Matthew Stephen Bloor; 13 September 1972 (age 53); Sutton Coldfield, Warwickshire, England
- Occupations: Radio presenter, television commentator, musician, drummer, producer, writer, podcast host

Matt Stephen Everitt (born Matthew Stephen Bloor, 13 September 1972) is an English producer, writer and presenter. He co-founded the production company Cup & Nuzzle and appears on BBC Radio 6 Music and BBC Radio 2. He was a drummer for Britpop band Menswear and the Montrose Avenue in the 1990s.

== Career ==
=== Music ===
Everitt replaced the original drummer of Menswear before their first release. They signed to London Records after their fifth gig for £90,000 and had five top 40 hits. Everitt left the band in 1997 to join the Montrose Avenue. They released one album and several singles and split in 1999.

=== Radio ===
Everitt began his career in radio in 2002 on Xfm, where he presented various shows and documentaries. He stayed with the station until 2007.

2007 saw Everitt join BBC Radio 6 Music, where he presented music news magazine show The Music Week for three years. He has since gone on to write and present the interview series The First Time With... hosting more than 200 shows with guests including David Gilmour, Yoko Ono, Michael Stipe, Noel Gallagher, Lars Ulrich, Pete Townshend, Elton John, Mavis Staples, Brian Wilson, Jimmy Page, Björk, Radiohead, Dave Grohl and Mike Oldfield.

He also presents music news on Lauren Laverne's BBC Radio 6 Music weekday breakfast show and on Ken Bruce's weekday mid-morning show on BBC Radio 2.

Everitt produces and presents radio documentaries including Maximum RNB - The Birth Of The Who for Radio 2, Bowie's Heroes for BBC 6 Music and The Business of Music with Matt Everitt for BBC Radio 4.

=== Production and podcasts ===
In 2015, Everitt co-founded the audio and video content production company Cup & Nuzzle. They developed and produced The Rolling Stones On Air podcast for Polydor, the AM/PM playlist show and Shaun Keaveny's Show & Tell podcast both for Spotify, Daisy Lowe's Femme podcast and Jessie Ware's Table Manners podcast for Acast.

Other Cup & Nuzzle productions include The Line Up with Shaun Keaveny, The Lotte Berk Technique presented by Nadine Shah, The Great James Bond Car Robbery, Transmissions: The Definitive Story of Joy Division and New Order, Michael Spicer’s It Happened to Me, Listen Up - The Oasis Podcast, True Spies, Gregory Porter - The Hang, Digging Deep - The Robert Plant Podcast.

=== Books ===
Everitt and Jim Stoten's book Where's My Welly?: The World's Greatest Music Festival Challenge was released in April 2018.

A book collecting together interviews from the BBC Radio 6 Music series The First Time was published in November 2018 by Laurence King Publishing.

=== Television ===
Everitt appears regularly on BBC One, BBC Four, Sky News, and Channel 4 as a music/culture/lifestyle commentator and co-hosted Your Vintage on British TV channel Vintage TV.

Everitt also acts as a music and sync consultant for One More Music Company

Everitt appeared on Celebrity Mastermind in December 2020, with a specialist subject of Glastonbury Festival and with War Child as his chosen charity. He competed against Scarlett Moffatt, Lucrezia Millarini, and Stephen K Amos, and finished second.

In November 2021, Everitt took place in BBC Breakfast’s Drumathon with BBC weather presenter Owain Wyn Evans, which made Children in Need history after becoming the charity's most successful 24 hour challenge ever. Comedian Al Murray, percussionist Evelyn Glennie and actor John Thomson (comedian) also took part.

In April 2022, he interviewed David Gilmour from Pink Floyd for stations across BBC radio and TV, where he exclusively revealed that the band had reformed to release a charity single entitled Hey, Hey, Rise Up! in aid of Ukraine Humanitarian Relief Fund, due to the 2022 Russian invasion of Ukraine.

=== Personal life ===
Everitt lives in England with his wife Beth Gordon, their daughter Bebe Lily and Beth's son Joseph, who is known for his viral review, of Radiohead's A Moon Shaped Pool.
