= NACUE =

National Association of College & University Entrepreneurs
- Abbreviation: NACUE
- Formation: 2009
- Founder: Victoria Lennox
- Type: Student organization
- Registration no.: 1139550
- Legal status: Charity
- Purpose: Promotion of student entrepreneurship
- Location: United Kingdom
- Members: Over 200 student societies
- CEO: Holly Knower
- Chairman: John MacIntyre
- Website: nacue.com

The National Association of College & University Entrepreneurs, abbreviated to and operating as NACUE, is a national organisation in the United Kingdom that promotes entrepreneurship amongst students in higher education and further education. It supports student enterprise societies at colleges and universities, through its existing network of 240 enterprise societies, as well as assisting new societies.

NACUE was founded in 2009, bringing together twelve enterprise societies at universities across the country. It became a charity in 2011, by which time its network consisted of 70 societies. At this stage, the government set an aim of having an enterprise society at every university in the country, with the network growing to 130 societies by 2013, almost 200 by 2014, and over 240 by 2015.

NACUE also organises events throughout the year. NACUE's largest event is the annual Student Enterprise Conference; the most recent conference, in March 2017, at the University of Lincoln. Other member institutions who have hosted in the last seven years include UCL, Liverpool John Moores and jointly at Sheffield Hallam Universities and The Sheffield College. The Student Enterprise Conference is Europe's largest conference dedicated to student enterprise.

NACUE's CEO is Holly Knower, while its chairman is John MacIntyre.
