= Timeline of BBC Radio 2 =

Key events for the national radio station in the United Kingdom

A timeline of notable events relating to BBC Radio 2, a British national radio station which began broadcasting in September 1967.

== 1960s ==
=== 1967 ===
- 30 September – BBC Radio 2 launches at 5:30am, replacing the BBC Light Programme. Cliff Adams, Barry Alldis, Kenneth Alwyn, Sam Costa, Alan Dell, Pat Doody, John Dunn, David Gell, Benny Green, David Hamilton, Paul Hollingdale, David Jacobs, Teddy Johnson, Humphrey Lyttelton, Brian Matthew, Ray Moore, Pete Murray, Eric Robinson and Alberto Semprini are among the launch team of the station.
- Breakfast Special, Family Favourites, Friday Night Is Music Night, Mrs Dale's Diary, Round the Horne, Sing Something Simple, The Sunday Hour and Woman's Hour are all transferred from the Light Programme to Radio 2.

=== 1968 ===
- David Allan, Michael Aspel, Katie Boyle, Charlie Chester, Tom Edwards and Bob Holness all join.
- 9 June – Round the Horne is broadcast for the final time.

=== 1969 ===
- 25 April – Mrs Dale's Diary is broadcast for the final time.
- 28 April – The first edition of soap opera Waggoners' Walk is broadcast.
- 11 June – The Organist Entertains, presented by Robin Richmond, is broadcast for the first time, as he joins the station.
- Dance Band Days, a weekly half hour programme of predominantly British dance band recordings of the 1920s to early 1940s, is broadcast for the first time. It was introduced by Alan Dell. The programmes were recorded off-air from FM broadcasts.

== 1970s ==
=== 1970 ===
- Tony Brandon, Peter Clayton, Alan Keith and Des Lynam join the station.
- 5 January – John Dunn becomes the permanent presenter of Breakfast Special.
- 3 April – Any Questions? is broadcast on Radio 2 for the final time, as it moves to Radio 4.
- 4 April – Following the transfer of BBC Radio's sports coverage from Radio 3 to Radio 2, the first edition of Sport on 2 is broadcast. The programme is much shorter in length than the old Sports Service, due to a later start to the programme.
- 5 April – Your Hundred Best Tunes moves to the station from Radio 4.
- The first voice heard on Radio 2, Paul Hollingdale, leaves.
- The first edition of Folk on 2 is broadcast as Jim Lloyd joins the station.

=== 1971 ===
- August – Eric Robinson hosts Melodies for You for the final time, as he leaves the station.
- 4 November – Radio 2 (and Radio 4) begin broadcasting in stereo in South East England. Stereo will be rolled out to the rest of the country over subsequent years.
- Kenneth Alwyn takes over as host of Melodies for You.
- Pat Doody leaves.

=== 1972 ===
- 3 April – Terry Wogan joins the station to present the Radio 2 breakfast show. He replaces John Dunn, who moves to afternoons. Breakfast Special disappears from the airwaves and a new early morning show is introduced, resulting in Radio 2 starting the day on weekdays and Saturdays 30 minutes earlier, at 5am. Sunday broadcasting still commences at just before 7am.
- 1 October – Sam Costa replaces Kenneth Alwyn as host of Melodies for You. Kenneth had hosted the show since the start of the year, as he leaves the station.

=== 1973 ===
- 2 July – Woman's Hour is transferred to Radio 4, while Jimmy Young joins the station to present the lunchtime show.
- Colin Berry joins the station as an announcer, newsreader and occasional presenter, David Hamilton leaves for a while.
- Simon Bates joins and Barry Alldis leaves.

=== 1974 ===
- 29 September – David Jacobs replaces Sam Costa as host of Melodies for You.

=== 1975 ===
- 6 January – Broadcasting hours are reduced due to budget cuts at the BBC. The former 5am to 2am schedule is reduced to a 6am start up Mondays to Saturdays and 6:55am on Sundays, with an earlier closedown time of around 12:33am each day. The cuts also see the weekday afternoon show, presented by David Hamilton, broadcast on both Radio 1 and Radio 2, as he rejoins the station.
- 29 September
  - The station closes slightly earlier, concluding its day at around 12:10am Mondays to Fridays, and at 12:33am on Saturdays and Sundays.
  - Radio 2 stops being available on VHF/FM for an hour on weeknights, when it lends its frequencies to Radio 1 between 11pm and midnight. Previously, it had been available on Long Wave only (apart from some VHF simulcasts on BBC Local Radio stations) between 10pm and midnight between October 1971 and December 1974, when various progressive rock shows on Radio 1 were given the higher-quality waveband.

=== 1976 ===
- January – Simon Bates leaves the station to join Radio 1.
- 4 October – John Dunn replaces Sam Costa as host of the drivetime show.
- Sarah Kennedy joins.

=== 1977 ===
- 1 March – After a one-off appearance in 1969, and presenting Family Favourites twice in 1974, Sheila Tracy joins the station on a permanent basis, as one of the presenters for The Late Show.
- 4 April – From that night, Radio 1 'borrows' Radio 2's VHF/FM frequencies for two hours each weeknight between 10pm and midnight.
- 6 August – David Gell leaves the station. His three shows, Europe 77, European Pop Jury, and Nordring Roundabout are briefly taken over by guest presenters Andy Cartledge, Nick Page, and Don Durbridge, before Colin Berry takes over the shows in February 1978.
- 28 November – David Hamilton's afternoon show is now heard on Radio 2 only, following the withdrawal of the 1975 economy measures.

=== 1978 ===
- Bill Rennells joins.
- Brian Matthew takes Radio 2 Round Midnight for the first time.
- 1 April – Broadcasting hours are extended to a 5am–2am schedule, when the budget restrictions were eased and the pre-1975 broadcasting hours are reintroduced.
- 23 November
  - Radio 2 moves from 1500m (200kHz) long wave to 433 & 330m (693 & 909kHz) medium wave as part of a plan to improve national AM reception, and to conform with the Geneva Frequency Plan of 1975.
  - The Shipping Forecast transfers from Radio 2 to Radio 4, so that it can continue to be broadcast on long wave.
- 22 December – Industrial action at the BBC by the ABS union, which started the previous day, extends to radio when their unions join their television counterparts by going on strike. This forces the BBC to merge the output of its four national radio networks into one station from 4pm, calling it the BBC All Network Radio Service. The strike is settled shortly before 10pm on that day, with the unions and BBC management reaching an agreement at the British government's industrial disputes arbitration service ACAS.

=== 1979 ===
- Steve Jones joins.
- 27 January – Radio 2 closes down for the final time. At 5am, it begins continuous broadcasting 24-hours a day with You and the Night and the Music, filling the overnight hours.
- 25 August – Big Band Special is broadcast for the first time.

== 1980s ==
=== 1980 ===
- 13 January – Family Favourites is broadcast for the final time.
- 3 March – Nigel Ogden replaces Robin Richmond as host of The Organist Entertains, as Ogden joins the station and Richmond leaves.
- 30 May – The final edition of soap opera Waggoners' Walk is broadcast.
- Ed Stewart joins the station to present the weekday afternoon show.

=== 1981 ===
- 3 October – Kenny Everett rejoins Radio 2 to present a Saturday morning show.
- 4 October – All Time Greats with Desmond Carrington is broadcast for the first time, as he joins the station.
- 6–31 October – For four weeks, Radio 2's overnight show, You and the Night and the Music, is replaced by 2's Company, which features a blend of music, drama, talks and documentaries from all BBC radio networks.
- Sam Costa leaves.
- Gloria Hunniford and Charles Nove join.

=== 1982 ===
- Stuart Hall joins and Alberto Semprini leaves.
- 3 December – Radio 2 is simulcast on Radio 1 for the final time.

=== 1983 ===
- 4 January – Radio 2 revives Music While You Work.
- 12 February – Sounds of the 60s is broadcast for the first time, the new show is dedicated to hits of that decade and is presented by Keith Fordyce.
- December – Kenny Everett leaves the station, his departure comes a fortnight after he made a risqué on-air joke about Margaret Thatcher.
- Peter Dickson joins.
- Ed Stewart and Sarah Kennedy both leave for a while.

=== 1984 ===
- 15 January – Pete Murray presents his final show as he leaves the station.
- 20 January – Ahead of changes to the schedule, following the decision not to renew the contract of long-standing presenter Ed Stewart, the year-long revival of Music While You Work ends and Gloria Hunniford takes over Ed's slot the following week. Steve Jones replaces Hunniford on the lunchtime show.
- 21 January
  - The overnight schedule is revamped. The station's original overnight show, You and the Night and the Music, is replaced by the return of Night Ride and a new 60-minute show, A Little Night Music, which is presented by that night's duty newsreader rather than having a regular, named presenter.
  - Ken Bruce becomes a regular presenter as he joins the station, when he takes over as the new host of the Saturday late-night show.
- 22 January – Sounds of Jazz moves to Radio 2 from Radio 1.
- 29 April – Radio 2 launches a Summer sport and entertainment show called Summer Sounds, it mixes sports coverage with music, guests and entertainment. It is broadcast on MW only, with the usual Sunday afternoon schedule continuing on VHF/FM. Previously, Sunday sports coverage had been restricted to a 30-minute early evening round-up show most weeks in the previous few years as more Summer sport moved to Sunday with special longer shows being broadcast increasingly frequently.
- 28 December – Terry Wogan ends his first run as presenter of The Radio 2 Breakfast Show, as he leaves the station for a while.
- Tom Edwards leaves, Martin Kelner and Canon Roger Royle join.

=== 1985 ===
- 7 January – Ken Bruce takes over Radio 2's breakfast show. David Jacobs, who had presented Melodies for You since 1974, launches a new weekday lunchtime show consisting mainly of tracks from musical theatre called The Music Of Our Lifetime. He replaces Steve Jones, who takes over the Saturday late show slot vacated by Bruce.
- 13 January – Robin Boyle replaces David Jacobs as host of Melodies for You.
- 6 July – Martin Kelner takes over the Saturday late show slot from Steve Jones.
- 28 September – A Little Night Music is broadcast for the first time. Airing daily between 3am and 4am, it replaces repeats of shows previously broadcast on Radio 2. Instead of having a regular or named host, it is presented by that night's newsreader.
- Radio 2 changes the format of Sounds of the 60s. The show is no longer hosted by a single presenter, instead, a different artist from the era presents it each week.
- Steve Jones and Tony Brandon leave, Chris Stuart, Steve Madden, Derek Jameson and Angela Rippon join.

=== 1986 ===
- Alan Dedicoat and Paul Jones join.
- 7 April
  - Derek Jameson takes over Radio 2's breakfast show from Ken Bruce, who moves to mid-mornings.
  - The weekday daytime schedule gives way to evening shows starting an hour earlier, at 7pm.
- 13 April – Richard Baker replaces Robin Boyle as host of Melodies for You, as he joins the station.
- May – Radio 2's Summer Sunday afternoon sports and entertainment show Summer Sounds is renamed Sunday Sport. It now has a greater emphasis on sports coverage, although music remains part of the mix.
- December – David Hamilton leaves, he says that his reason for going is because the music policy had become "geriatric", following a repositioning of the station, under the influence of new Head of Music Frances Line, to appeal to over-50s with a playlist of nostalgia, easy listening and light music.

=== 1987 ===
- January – Sport bulletins are broadcast at breakfast for the first time. Previously, other than a racing report or ad-hoc bulletins for specific events, sports news had not started until lunchtime.
- Alex Lester and Adrian Love join.

=== 1988 ===
- Chris Stuart replaces Ray Moore as presenter of the Early Show, when the latter announces he is suffering from cancer and leaves the station before his death in January 1989. Moore had presented the show since 1980. Stuart, previously a breakfast show presenter on BBC Radio Wales, had often covered the show since 1985. Graham Knight joins the station to present the weekend early shows.
- 17 September–2 October – The 1988 Summer Olympics is the last Olympic Games broadcast on Radio 2, it is also the final time that any substantial sports coverage is broadcast on a BBC national FM frequency. Unlike for previous Summer Games, coverage is restricted to inserts into regular shows as opposed to special Olympic shows.
- 24 September – Simon Dee joins and takes over Sounds of the 60s.
- 29 September – Radio 1 'borrows' Radio 2's FM frequencies on a weeknight for the final time, following the start of a show of switching on transmitters to allow Radio 1 to broadcast full-time on FM which, at this time, was available to two thirds of the UK.
- Anne Robinson and Billy Butler join, Stuart Hall leaves.

=== 1989 ===
- 24 March – Simon Dee quits after only six months at the station, Peter Dickson also leaves.
- 1 October – Radio 2 begins a series of Sunday afternoon performances of works by Gilbert and Sullivan. The 12-week series, which runs until Christmas, replaces the station's usual Sunday afternoon schedule.
- 30 December – Radio 1 'borrows' Radio 2's FM frequencies on a Saturday afternoon for the final time.

== 1990s ==
=== 1990 ===
- 6 January – Radio 2 becomes available on FM on Saturday afternoons for the first time. A new music schedule is created, with Katie Boyle presenting a two-hour show, while sport continues on MW.
- 24 March – Martin Kelner leaves for a while.
- 25 March – At 7pm, Radio 2 becomes available on FM 24/7 for the first time after the final ever 'borrow' of its FM frequencies from Radio 1.
- 29 March – Ahead of major changes to Radio 2's output, Brian Matthew goes Round Midnight for the final time.
- 31 March – Sounds of the 50s, presented by Ronnie Hilton, is launched. The new show is dedicated to hits of that decade and Brian Matthew takes over as host of Sounds of the 60s.
- 2 April – The changes to weekday programming begin. Ken Bruce launches a new late night show, with Judith Chalmers joining the station to replace Ken at mid-mornings. A weeknight late night jazz show called Jazz Parade is launched as a replacement for Sounds of Jazz, a weekday guest afternoon slot is introduced, featuring a different personality choosing their favourite music each week.
- 6 April – The first edition of The Radio 2 Arts Programme is broadcast. It airs on Friday, Saturday and Sunday evenings between 10pm and midnight.
- 2 June – Ahead of ending sports coverage on Radio 2, and the consequent cessation of sports news on the FM waveband, the 10pm evening round-up starts to be aired only on MW. The change also sees the weekday late evening round-up moved from 9:55pm to just after the 10pm news.
- 30 June – All sports desks from 10am onwards are now only broadcast on MW, with just the first three desks of the day, aired at breakfast time, still carried on FM.
- 8 July – Wimbledon is broadcast on Radio 2 MW for the final time, from the following year, the event will be broadcast on BBC Radio 5.
- 14 August – At 8:31am, a sports desk is broadcast on Radio 2's FM frequencies for the final time, although a Sports Round-Up continues to be part of Derek Jameson's breakfast show.
- 15 August – Radio 2 begins to wind down its transmissions on MW, ahead of the launch of Radio 5, the new station will occupy Radio 2's MW frequencies, by broadcasting a daytime information service providing advice about how to listen to Radio 2 on FM.
- 25 August – Sport on 2 is broadcast for the final time.
- 26 August – Sport is aired on Radio 2 for the final time, when the final sports bulletin is broadcast at 10:02pm.
- 27 August – At midnight, Radio 2 stops broadcasting on MW, thereby becoming the first national radio station in the UK to broadcast only on FM.
- 16 September – The Sunday Hour is revamped, instead of coming from a different church each week, it now becomes a studio-based show with Roger Royle as presenter.
- Don Maclean and Fran Godfrey join, Billy Butler leaves.

=== 1991 ===
- 1 January – Chris Stuart takes over the late-night 10pm to midnight show.
- 7 January – Ken Bruce takes over the early morning 6am to 7:30am show.
- August – Peter Clayton hosts his final shows for the station, presenting Jazz Parade until his death on 10 August.
- 20 December – Derek Jameson leaves The Radio 2 Breakfast Show, after presenting it for five years, while the final weekday lunchtime serving of Our Kind of Music takes place.
- 25 December – Norma Major, the wife of prime minister John Major, is a guest presenter on Radio 2, where she presents a show playing some of her favourite seasonal music.
- 29 December – Ahead of a major schedule shake-up, Graham Knight presents the weekend early breakfast show for the final time.
- Brian Hayes and John Sachs join, Ed Stewart rejoins.

=== 1992 ===
- 6 January
  - In a major shake-up of the daytime schedule, Brian Hayes takes over as host of The Radio 2 Breakfast Show from Derek Jameson, who moves to a new late evening slot, co-presented with his wife Ellen, who joins the station. Ken Bruce returns to the mid-morning show following Judith Chalmers' departure, while Ed Stewart, who rejoined the station the previous year, takes over as the mid-afternoon presenter. Weekend changes see Melodies for You move to early evenings and Barbara Sturgeon replaces Graham Knight as presenter of the weekend early shows, as she joins the station. The weekday music policy is slightly adjusted: Sunday afternoon output is branded Vintage Years, while John Sachs presents a Sunday morning show, with a comparatively modern playlist compared to most of the station's other output at the time.
  - Radio 2 launches the Radio 2 Top 20 Easy Listening Album Chart, broadcast each Monday during Ed Stewart's show.
- April – Alex Lester becomes the permanent early morning presenter, a slot previously hosted on rotation by the station's announcers and newsreaders. In July, Steve Madden becomes the permanent overnight presenter, in a slot which had similarly been hosted by the presentation team on rotation since the late 1970s.
- 28 June – Radio 2 provides fifteen hours of coverage of the first annual National Music Day, presented by Ken Bruce.
- 23 December – Brian Hayes presents The Radio 2 Breakfast Show for the final time.
- Keith Fordyce and Teddy Johnson leave, Nick Barraclough joins.

=== 1993 ===
- 4 January – Terry Wogan returns to the station with Wake Up to Wogan and Sarah Kennedy also makes a return to take over the early show, which later becomes known as The Dawn Patrol.
- 3 April – Shortly after midnight, Radio 2 airs the final edition of its weeknight jazz show, Jazz Parade. It is presented by Digby Fairweather and features the BBC Big Band, conducted by Barry Forgie.
- Bill Rennells, Barbara Sturgeon, John Sachs and Anne Robinson leave.

=== 1994 ===
- Adrian Love leaves.
- 1 October – Martin Kelner rejoins, after four years away, to present a Saturday afternoon show and to stand in for other presenters. This show, along with documentaries and concerts broadcast after it, represents a tentative attempt to appeal more to the "Beatles generation", which the station is encouraged to appeal to in the 'People and Programmes' report, published in February 1995.

=== 1995 ===
- 21 April – Gloria Hunniford leaves the station, after 11 years.
- 12 June – Debbie Thrower joins the station, replacing Hunniford as the new weekday early afternoon presenter.
- 1 July – Mo Dutta joins the station to present weekend early morning shows.
- 27 September – Radio 2 begins to broadcast digitally following the commencement by the BBC of regular Digital Audio Broadcasting, from the Crystal Palace transmitting station.
- October – Following the death of Alan Dell, Malcolm Laycock becomes presenter of Dance Band Days, as he joins the station.
- 19 November – Although he is still billed in the Radio Times until 10 December, Charlie Chester is likely to have presented his last Radio 2 show on this day, as this was just before he had a stroke, after which he could not walk or speak.
- Frank Renton joins.

=== 1996 ===
- Pam Ayres and Michael Parkinson join, with the launch of Parkinson's Sunday Supplement.
- 30 March – Steve Wright joins the station, to present weekend mid-morning shows including the launch of Sunday Love Songs.
- July – Hugh Scully takes over as presenter of Melodies for You.
- 6 October – The first edition of The David Jacobs Collection is broadcast on Sunday evenings.
- 29 November – Martin Kelner presents his last show on the station. During the year, Chris Stuart, Wally Whyton and Katie Boyle leave.

=== 1997 ===
- 29 March – Bob Harris joins, to present a Saturday late night show "for the discerning music fan".
- 3 April – Derek and Ellen Jameson present their late night show for the final time, as they leave the station. Richard Allinson joins the station and takes over the late show the following Monday.
- 5 April – Pick of the Pops returns to the BBC. The show is aired on Saturday afternoons with Alan Freeman returning and joining the station as the host. It had last been on Radio 1 at the end of 1992 and, throughout most of the intervening period, it had been broadcast on Capital Gold in the London area only.
- 31 August – Regular scheduled programming on the BBC's radio and television stations is abandoned to provide ongoing news coverage of the death of Diana, Princess of Wales. Radio 2 airs a special programme from BBC Radio News, which is also carried on Radio 1, Radio 3, Radio 4 and Radio 5 Live. Radio 2 broadcasts live coverage of the funeral six days later.
- Angela Rippon leaves and Mike Harding joins.
- Robbie Vincent joins, but later leaves.
- 17 December – The final edition of Folk on 2 is broadcast, as Jim Lloyd leaves the station.

=== 1998 ===
- Stuart Maconie, Paul Gambaccini, Jools Holland and Mark Lamarr join, Benny Green (on his death), Debbie Thrower and Bob Holness leave.
- 16 February – The PopMaster quiz feature of Ken Bruce's mid-morning show is broadcast for the first time.
- 13 April – Dance Band Days is broadcast for the final time. The show's content is then subsumed in Sunday Night at 10 and is also presented by Malcolm Laycock, until it was axed in 2008.
- 2 October – John Dunn presents his final drivetime show after 22 years, as he retires from radio broadcasting due to ill health.
- 5 October – A major overhaul of the schedule sees many new faces joining the station, including the singer Katrina Leskanich, Jackie Bird, and former Radio 1 presenters Lynn Parsons and Andy Peebles. They present overnight shows on weekdays and weekends respectively, replacing Steve Madden and Charles Nove. Johnnie Walker joins the station as a regular presenter hosting the afternoon drivetime show (Monday to Thursday), with Des Lynam presenting the show on Fridays. Andrew Peach joins the newsreading team and Sally Boazman becomes the station's first official travel news presenter, they both remain in those long-standing roles as of 2026.

=== 1999 ===
- David Allan, Pam Ayres and Michael Aspel leave. Jonathan Ross and Bobbie Pryor join the station with the latter being the first official travel news presenter for weekends. Bob Harris presents a reformatted country music show, replacing David Allan.
- 3 April – Sounds of the 70s is broadcast for the first time, a new show dedicated to the hits of that decade. It is presented by singer Steve Harley.
- 26 April – Johnnie Walker is suspended from his drivetime show and the station, after allegations concerning a drug problem appeared in the tabloid, the News of the World. Richard Allinson presents the drivetime show during Walker's absence, while Tom Robinson stands in on his Saturday afternoon show.
- 26 June – Janice Long joins.
- 2 July – Ed Stewart hosts his final weekday afternoon show, as he moves to weekends.
- 5 July – Steve Wright in the Afternoon returns to radio after a break of six years away, as he replaces Ed Stewart in the slot.
- 1 August – Richard Baker begins his second stint as host of Melodies for You.
- 2 August – It is announced that ITV has signed BBC Sport presenter Des Lynam on a four-year contract to become their main football presenter. This means he will no longer present his Friday drivetime show.
- 14 October – Managers at Radio 2 reinstate Johnnie Walker, after he is fined £2,000 by magistrates for admitting possession of cocaine. He will return to the airwaves on 6 December.
- 6 December – Johnnie Walker returns from suspension.

== 2000s ==
=== 2000 ===
- February – Radio 2 presents its first annual BBC Radio 2 Folk Awards.
- 3 April – Janice Long starts presenting the midnight show.
- 8 April – Dale Winton joins and replaces Alan Freeman as host of Pick of the Pops, as he retires from radio broadcasting due to ill health.
- 21 October – Comedian Jack Docherty joins the station to host Saturday Night Jack, the show lasts three months.
- Jackie Bird, Sheila Tracy and Katrina Leskanich leave, Lynn Bowles joins, becoming the station's first official travel news presenter for weekday mornings.

=== 2001 ===
- 10 May – For the first time, Radio 2 becomes the UK's most listened to radio station, overtaking Radio 1, it has held that position ever since.
- 1 October – Radio 2 starts broadcasting a weekly album chart show. The one-hour show is broadcast on Monday evenings and is presented by Simon Mayo, who joins the station from Radio 1.
- 25 November – After 42 years on air, Sing Something Simple is broadcast for the final time.
- Jack Docherty and Cliff Adams (the latter on his death) leave.

=== 2002 ===
- Andy Peebles leaves.
- 11 March – Sister station Radio 6 Music launches.
- 20 December – Sir Jimmy Young presents his final lunchtime show after 50 years of broadcasting, as he leaves the station and retires.

=== 2003 ===
- Sybil Ruscoe joins, Alan Keith hosts his final Your Hundred Best Tunes and leaves the station before his death.
- 6 January – Jeremy Vine joins the station and takes over the lunchtime show from Sir Jimmy Young.
- March – Richard Baker takes over as host of Your Hundred Best Tunes. Brian Kay briefly replaces Richard as host of Melodies for You with Sheridan Morley taking over the show the following year.
- 5 June – Johnnie Walker announces that he will be taking time off air for a while, to undergo treatment after being diagnosed with Non-Hodgkin lymphoma. During his time away, the show will be presented by Stuart Maconie and Noel Edmonds, the latter making a brief return to radio.

=== 2004 ===
- 5 January – Lesley Douglas succeeds James Moir as the station controller.
- 1 March – Johnnie Walker returns to his drivetime show, following a nine-month break away for cancer treatment.
- 7 June – Mark Radcliffe joins the station and takes over the late show from Richard Allinson.
- 28 August – The weekly edition of Pick of the Pops with Dale Winton ends, although bank holiday editions of the show continue to be broadcast.
- 29 August – Desmond Carrington presents his last weekend edition of All Time Greats, as he moves to weekdays to present The Music Goes Round on Tuesday and later Friday nights.
- 4 September – Dermot O'Leary joins and starts hosting his Saturday afternoon show.
- 5 September – Elaine Paige joins and starts hosting her Sunday lunchtime movies and musicals show Elaine Paige on Sunday.
- Sybil Ruscoe leaves.

=== 2005 ===
- 18 September – A year after Radio 2 stopped broadcasting a weekly edition of Pick of the Pops, it returns on a regular basis on Sunday afternoons, with Dale Winton as host.
- Chris Evans joins and takes over Saturday afternoons.

=== 2006 ===
- Aled Jones and Matthew Wright join, Don Maclean and Brian Hayes leave.
- 28 February – Johnnie Walker announces that he will leave the Drivetime show after seven years. He will present his last show on 31 March, as he moves to replace Ed Stewart on Sunday afternoons.
- 16 April – Ed Stewart presents his final Sunday afternoon show, as he leaves the station for a while.
- 18 April – Chris Evans takes over the Drivetime show from Johnnie Walker, while Jonny Saunders and Rebecca Pike both join.
- Pete Mitchell and Clare Teal join.
- 26 August – Brian Matthew takes a break from radio broadcasting for a while, due to a viral infection illness.
- 18 November – Russell Brand joins the station to present a weekly Saturday evening show.

=== 2007 ===
- 21 January – Your Hundred Best Tunes is broadcast for the final time, after 47 years on air. It would be replaced a week later by Melodies for You, with Alan Titchmarsh joining the station to present the show.
- 10 February – Brian Matthew returns to Sounds of the 60s.
- 4 April – Bob Harris announces he will take a break from his shows, to receive treatment for prostate cancer.
- 8 April – Roger Royle presents The Sunday Hour for the final time after 17 years, as he retires from the station. He is replaced the following week by Brian D'Arcy, who joins the station.
- 16 April – The first Radcliffe and Maconie Show, presented by Mark Radcliffe and Stuart Maconie, is aired.
- 19 October – Michael Parkinson announces that he will leave his Sunday morning show, Parkinson's Sunday Supplement, and also the station after 11 years. He will present his last show on 2 December.
- 1 December – Bob Harris returns.
- 24 December – Ed Stewart rejoins for the last time and hosts his first ever Christmas Junior Choice show, as it is broadcast on Radio 2 for the first time.
- Steve Lamacq and Bob Dylan join, Nick Barraclough and Richard Baker leave.

=== 2008 ===
- 17 March – Humphrey Lyttelton retires from radio broadcasting. He had presented Best of Jazz for the last 40 years, he dies a month later.
- 28 March – Steve Harley leaves the station, after hosting his final Sounds of the 70s show.
- 6 April – Michael Ball joins for the launch of Michael Ball's Sunday Brunch, as he replaces Michael Parkinson.
- 9 April – Trevor Nelson joins and brings his Rhythm Nation show to the station.
- 16 October – An edition of the Russell Brand Show, co-hosted with fellow Radio 2 presenter Jonathan Ross, is recorded for transmission at a later date. The show includes Brand and Ross leaving four prank messages on actor Andrew Sachs' answerphone, including offensive remarks about his granddaughter and use of foul language. It is subsequently broadcast on 18 October, partially censored, having passed the various pre-transmission checks from the show's editors. Initially, it only receives a negligible number of complaints regarding Ross's bad language, however, after the incident is reported a week later by The Mail on Sunday, a public outcry soon ensues. The case is referred to both Ofcom and the BBC Trust. In the interim period, Ross and Brand are both suspended for three months from all BBC shows pending investigation. Soon after these announcements, Russell Brand announces his resignation, as he leaves the station.
- 30 October – Controller Lesley Douglas's resignation is announced, as she leaves the station.
- Matthew Wright leaves, Suzi Quatro and Claudia Winkleman join.

=== 2009 ===
- 24 January – Jonathan Ross returns to the station and the BBC, after being suspended.
- 27 January – Bob Shennan is appointed as Controller following the resignation of Lesley Douglas. He will take up the position in February.
- 13 March – The station confirms plans to overhaul its weekend schedule from 4 April. This will include Paul O'Grady, Alan Carr and Emma Forbes joining the station, while the Saturday afternoon comedy hour will move to Thursday evenings. Pick of the Pops with Dale Winton moves from Sunday afternoons to 1–3pm on Saturdays. The changes will also see Johnnie Walker present Sounds of the 70s on Sunday afternoons.
- 5 April
  - Sounds of the 70s returns to the airwaves on a regular and permanent basis, with Johnnie Walker as its presenter. It had been on air on an ad-hoc basis since 1999.
  - Paul O'Grady joins to present a new Sunday teatime show, Paul O'Grady on the Wireless, as part of the weekend schedule changes.
- 25 April – The first edition of the Saturday evening show Going Out with Alan Carr is broadcast.
- 22 May – The BBC says that Jonathan Ross's show will no longer be broadcast live, following complaints about a joke he made on an edition of the show, which some listeners interpreted as being anti-gay.
- 30 May – Mo Dutta leaves the station, after 14 years.
- 31 May – Pete Mitchell leaves the station to join Radio X.
- 6–7 June – Zoe Ball joins the station. Ball and Emma Forbes present the Saturday and Sunday weekend breakfast shows respectively.
- 26 July – Malcolm Laycock presents his final edition of Sunday Night at 10, as he leaves the station.
- 2 August – Clare Teal takes over from Malcolm Laycock on Sunday nights.
- 15 August – Malcolm Laycock criticises the network's management for abandoning its older listeners and claims that he was constructively dismissed by the station, although Radio 2 denies this to be the case. He resigned from his position following a long-running dispute with his producer over the content of his show and because of issues regarding his salary.
- 7 September – Sir Terry Wogan announces that he will step down as host of The Radio 2 Breakfast Show on 18 December, as he moves to weekends from 14 February 2010.
- 18 December – After 28 years, in two separate stints, Sir Terry Wogan presents his final breakfast show.
- 20 December – Michael Ball leaves his Sunday mid-morning slot for a while.
- 24 December – The final edition of Chris Evans Drivetime is broadcast, ahead of his move to The Radio 2 Breakfast Show.
- Bob Dylan leaves.

== 2010s ==
=== 2010 ===
- 7 January – Jonathan Ross announces that he will leave the station and the BBC, when his contract ends in July.
- 11 January
  - Chris Evans presents his first breakfast show. It also sees the return of newsreader Moira Stuart to the BBC after two years away.
  - Simon Mayo takes over the drivetime show and Matt Williams joins. It takes on a zoo format by introducing co-hosts and new features.
- 14 February – Sir Terry Wogan hosts his first Sunday mid-morning show Weekend Wogan.
- 11 March – Radio 2 confirms plans to overhaul its schedule from April. This will include moving two of its longest-running shows, Big Band Special and The Organist Entertains, to different time slots, its comedy hour switches from Thursday to Saturday evenings – the second time it has moved in 12 months.
- 30 March – Desmond Carrington's show is broadcast for the last time on Tuesday evenings, as it moves to Friday evenings from 9 April. Jamie Cullum's jazz show replaces Carrington's in this slot from 6 April.
- 9 April – Desmond Carrington hosts his first Friday evening edition of The Music Goes Round.
- 30 April – It is reported that Emma Forbes has quit as co-host of the Saturday night show Going Out with Alan Carr, after a disagreement with her bosses over time off. She leaves the station and is replaced by Melanie Sykes.
- 17 July – Jonathan Ross leaves the station for a while.
- 3 September – Radio 2 announces that Sarah Kennedy had left the station after 17 years and is retiring. By then, she had been absent from the early morning show for three weeks, as her last show was on 13 August. Lynn Parsons is the show's stand-in presenter for its remaining time on air.
- 24 September – It is announced that Tony Blackburn will join the station on a permanent basis, taking over from Dale Winton on Pick of the Pops on Saturday afternoons, Winton presents his last show on 30 October and leaves the station.
- 2 October – Graham Norton joins and takes over the Saturday morning show from Jonathan Ross.
- 6 November – Tony Blackburn joins the station and hosts his first Pick of the Pops.
- 24 December – Mark Lamarr and Suzi Quatro leave, Bill Kenwright joins.

=== 2011 ===
- Dave Pearce joins the station to host a weekly dance music show, Dave Pearce's Dance Years, which will air on Saturday evenings.
- 17 January – Vanessa Feltz joins and takes over Sarah Kennedy's early morning show.
- 31 January – Radio 2 announces the cancellation of its annual Electric Proms season after five years, citing financial considerations.
- 23 March – The Radcliffe and Maconie Show is broadcast on Radio 2 for the final time, as it moves to Radio 6 Music.
- 2 April – Huey Morgan joins.
- 4 April – Jo Whiley joins the station on a permanent basis, after she leaves Radio 1 to present a new Monday to Thursday weekday evening show. She replaces Mark Radcliffe and Stuart Maconie.
- 22 June – Radio 2 hosts 2DAY, a day of 12 hour-long shows to promote some of the station's specialist output normally reserved for evenings and weekends.
- 28 August – Alan Titchmarsh presents the final edition of Melodies for You, as he leaves the station. The show was scrapped to change its format for representing the genres, it was dedicated to popular classic and light music, and part of the station's Sunday schedule since it launched in 1967.
- 11 September – The first ever Radio 2 Live in Hyde Park music festival is held in London's Hyde Park.
- Jonny Saunders leaves the station to become a teacher, Vassos Alexander joins from 5 Live.

=== 2012 ===
- 28 January – Zoe Ball steps down from hosting the Saturday weekend breakfast show, as she leaves the station for a while, she will be replaced on 25 February by Anneka Rice.
- 29 January – Brian D'Arcy hosts his final The Sunday Hour show and leaves the station to join BBC Radio Ulster.
- 5 February – Diane-Louise Jordan joins as the new host of The Sunday Hour.
- 25 February – Anneka Rice joins and replaces Zoe Ball on the Saturday weekend breakfast show.
- 6 March – Alan Carr announces his intention to quit his show Going Out with Alan Carr, so that he can devote more time to his television career. Both he and co-host Melanie Sykes both leave the station on 31 March.
- 14 April – Radio 2 airs a minute-by-minute account of the sinking of the RMS Titanic, to coincide with the 100th anniversary of the disaster.
- 12 May – Liza Tarbuck joins, replacing Alan Carr and Melanie Sykes, and begins presenting her first regular show.
- September – Radio 2 ends the practice of having its own team of newsreaders, as this role is now taken on by journalists. As a result, Colin Berry and Charles Nove both leave. Berry had been a newsreader for the station since 1973.
- 17 October – Radio 2 axes folk presenter Mike Harding, after 15 years with the station, he will host his last show on 26 December.
- Aled Jones leaves the station to join Classic FM, BBC Radio Wales and Radio 3.
- Carol Kirkwood joins the station, as its first official Radio 2 Breakfast Show weather news presenter.

=== 2013 ===
- 2 January – Mark Radcliffe takes over Mike Harding's Wednesday night folk music show.
- 20 January – The Sunday Hour is doubled in length, but moves from Sunday evenings to Sunday mornings, At the same time, Clare Balding joins the station, taking over from Aled Jones as host of Good Morning Sunday. Michael Ball hosts his first ever Sunday night show.
- 4 August – Following a career with the BBC Light Programme and Radio 2 spanning more than 40 years, David Jacobs retires, he dies almost a month later.
- 23 September – Big Band Special is broadcast for the final time.
- 5 October – Sara Cox joins the station to host Sounds of the 80s, a new show dedicated to hits of that decade.
- 1 November – Paul Gambaccini's America's Greatest Hits is dropped from its Saturday night slot, after he was arrested as part of the Operation Yewtree investigation. Gambaccini took the decision not to go on air following the resulting media interest. He returns to the station a year later, after it is decided that he will face no charges.
- Don Black joins.
- Stuart Maconie and Steve Lamacq both leave the station to rejoin Radio 6 Music.
- Jules Lang joins the station as the station's first official stand-in travel news presenter.
- Trevor Nelson rejoins on a permanent basis, after he leaves Radio 1.

=== 2014 ===
- February – Sara Cox rejoins on permanent basis, after leaving Radio 1.
- 7–10 April – As part of the BBC's celebration of the 20th anniversary of Britpop, Steve Lamacq and Jo Whiley present a week of Radio 1's former long-running The Evening Session on Radio 2.
- 8 May – Radio 2 launches its first pop-up DAB station BBC Radio 2 Eurovision. It returned a year later to cover the 2015 contest.
- 8 & 10 August – Sally Boazman presents her final travel news reports for weekdays, as she moves to weekends.
- 11 & 16 August – Bobbie Pryor presents her first travel reports for weekday afternoons. Orna Merchant joins the station as the new travel news reporter for weekends, while Sally Boazman presents her first travel reports for weekends.
- 15 August – Jonathan Ross returns after four years away.
- October – Radio 2 stops broadcasting a full overnight schedule for a while, as part of cost-cutting measures. The 3am to 5am weeknight slot broadcasts repeats of weekly shows.
- Lynn Parsons, Dave Pearce, Fran Godfrey and Richard Allinson leave, Craig Charles and Ana Matronic join.

=== 2015 ===
- 5–8 March – Radio 2 launches its second pop-up station BBC Radio 2 Country, to cover the annual C2C: Country to Country festival. It returned to cover the 2016 and 2017 events.
- 27 March – Newsreader and continuity announcer Alan Dedicoat presents his final bulletins after 28 years, as he retires from the station.
- 8 November – Sir Terry Wogan hosts his final Weekend Wogan, which is also his final broadcast, due to ill health.
- 17 December – Rebecca Pike leaves.
- 25 December – Ed Stewart hosts his last ever Christmas Junior Choice show and leaves the station, before his death the following month.

=== 2016 ===
- 31 January – Sir Terry Wogan's death is announced. Mark Goodier presents an ad-hoc phone-in show on Sunday morning to hear listeners' memories.
- 25 February – Tony Blackburn is dismissed by the BBC and Mark Goodier takes over as temporary host of Pick of the Pops.
- 3 April – Michael Ball hosts his final Sunday night show, as he moves back to Sunday mid-mornings on 10 April, replacing Weekend Wogan.
- 14–17 April – Radio 2 launches its third pop-up station, BBC Radio 2 50s.
- 15 April – Sounds of the 80s moves to Fridays.
- 16 April – Craig Charles' House Party show is broadcast for the first time.
- 24 April – Claudia Winkleman hosts her first Sunday night show.
- 9 July
  - Paul Gambaccini becomes the new host of Pick of the Pops.
  - Trevor Nelson brings his Rhythm Nation R&B show to Saturday nights, he had previously presented a Wednesday evening soul show for the station. Fearne Cotton joins.
- 28 October – Desmond Carrington presents his final show after 36 years, as he retires from the station. He dies three months later.
- 31 December – Tony Blackburn is rehired by the BBC.

=== 2017 ===
- 6 January – Tony Blackburn's Golden Hour is broadcast for the first time.
- 9 January – Radio 2 announces that all remaining overnight live programming will be dropped for a while, as part of cost-cutting measures. Consequently, the After Midnight programme, will be axed in favour of repeats of shows such as Sounds of the 60s and Pick of the Pops, while an automated service titled Radio 2 Playlists will air in the 2am and 5am slots.
- 21 January – Dermot O'Leary hosts his final Saturday mid-afternoon show.
- 26 January – Janice Long leaves the station to join BBC Radio Wales and Greatest Hits Radio.
- 29 January – Alex Lester leaves the station to join BBC Local Radio and Greatest Hits Radio.
- 1 February – Clare Teal presents Desmond Carrington – All Time Great, a special tribute show celebrating his life, having died that day.
- 25 February – Brian Matthew presents his final edition of Sounds of the 60s, following his retirement due to ill health, he dies two months later. Anneka Rice hosts her final Saturday weekend breakfast show, as she leaves the station for a while.
- 4 March – Tony Blackburn replaces Brian Matthew as presenter of Sounds of the 60s, the two-hour show also moves to the earlier time of 6am. Zoe Ball rejoins the station on permanent basis to host a new Saturday mid-afternoon show, while Dermot O'Leary takes over from Anneka Rice on the Saturday breakfast show.
- 26 March – Bob Harris presents his final weekend overnight show.
- 1 April – Anneka Rice rejoins the station on permanent basis to host her new Saturday weekend late-night show The Pick of Radio 2.
- 2 April – Ana Matronic presents her first ever Sunday weekend late-night Disco and Dance Devotion show.
- 9 June – Gary Davies joins, having returned to BBC Radio after 23 years away.
- 9 July – Diane-Louise Jordan presents The Sunday Hour for the final time, as she leaves the station, she is replaced the following week by Kate Bottley, who joins the station.
- 30 September – The 50th anniversary of the launch of Radios 1 and 2 is celebrated. The two stations air a joint 90-minute show presented by Nick Grimshaw and Tony Blackburn. Radio 2 reconstructs the first ever Radio 1 show on Sounds of the 60s.
- 26 November – Clare Balding hosts Good Morning Sunday for the final time, as she leaves the station.
- 25 December – Anneka Rice presents her first ever Christmas Junior Choice programme, replacing Ed Stewart who died the previous year.

=== 2018 ===
- Paul Jones leaves, Cerys Matthews and Angela Scanlon join.
- 4 January – Jonathan Ross leaves.
- 28 January – After nearly 78 years on air, The Sunday Hour is broadcast on Radio 2 for the final time.
- 4 February – Good Morning Sunday is relaunched and extended into a three-hour show, presented by Kate Bottley and Jason Mohammad, as he joins the station.
- 29 March – Lynn Bowles, who has been reading travel news on weekday mornings for the station since the year 2000, leaves to rejoin BBC Radio Wales. She is replaced the following week by Rachel Horne, who joins the station as the new travel news presenter for weekday mornings.
- 8 May – Long-running specialist music shows The Organist Entertains and Listen to the Band are broadcast for the final time, the former had been on air since 1969, as Nigel Ogden and Frank Renton both leave the station.
- 10 May – The final edition of The Radio 2 Arts Programme is broadcast, ending after 28 years on air.
- 11 May – Sara Cox steps down from hosting Sounds of the 80s.
- 14 May – A new weekday evening and overnight schedule launches. Jo Whiley joins Simon Mayo to present an extended drivetime show, as Matt Williams leaves the station, her evening slot would then occupied by specialist music and documentaries. Sara Cox launches a new Monday to Thursday late-night show. Live overnight broadcasting returns with a new midnight to 3am show, presented by OJ Borg, who joins the station.
- 18 May – Gary Davies replaces Sara Cox as presenter of Sounds of the 80s.
- 18 June – The Radio 2 Rock Show with Johnnie Walker is broadcast for the first time.
- 3 September – Chris Evans reveals live on air that he is to leave The Radio 2 Breakfast Show and the station at the end of the year.
- 3 October – Mark Radcliffe takes a break from radio broadcasting for a while, to receive treatment for cancer. It is also announced that Zoe Ball will take over as presenter of The Radio 2 Breakfast Show in January 2019.
- 22 October – Radio 2's unpopular Drivetime Show with Simon Mayo and Jo Whiley is to finish at the end of the year, after a backlash from listeners. Jo will move back to an evening slot in January 2019. Simon will leave Radio 2, but he will continue his Radio 5 Live film review programme.
- 29 October – It is announced that Sara Cox will replace Simon Mayo on drivetime, the show will move back to its two-hour slot from 5pm to 7pm in January 2019.
- 8 November – It is announced that Rylan Clark will replace Zoe Ball on Saturday mid-afternoons in January 2019.
- 13 December – Sara Cox hosts her final Monday to Thursday late-night show.
- 14 December – Moira Stuart reads the news on Radio 2 for the final time, as she leaves the station to join Classic FM.
- 17 December – The Radio 2 Rock Show with Johnnie Walker broadcasts its final Monday night show, as it moves to weekends.
- 21 December – Simon Mayo leaves.
- 22 December – Zoe Ball presents her final Saturday mid-afternoon show.
- 24 December – After presenting The Radio 2 Breakfast Show for the past eight years, Chris Evans leaves the station to join Virgin Radio. Vassos Alexander and Rachel Horne both leave.

=== 2019 ===
- 12 January – Trevor Nelson hosts his final Saturday night Rhythm Nation show, as he moves to weekdays.
- 14–19 January
  - Zoe Ball takes over as presenter of The Radio 2 Breakfast Show. Richie Anderson (travel news reporter for weekday mornings), Mike Williams (sports reporter) and Tina Daheley (news presenter) all join the station.
  - Other major changes to the schedule take place. Sara Cox replaces Simon Mayo as presenter of the drivetime show, the programme returns to its two-hour format from 5pm to 7pm. Jo Whiley follows, with the return of her Monday to Thursday evening show, the specialist music programmes move to 9pm, and Trevor Nelson replaces Sara Cox as presenter of the Monday to Thursday late-night show with his programme Rhythm Nation. Weekend changes see Rylan Clark replacing Zoe Ball as host of the Saturday mid-afternoon show, as he joins the station, the Saturday evening slot being filled by some of the displaced weeknight specialist shows, as The Radio 2 Rock Show with Johnnie Walker now moves to Saturday nights.
- 25 January – Radio 2 confirms that Johnnie Walker will be taking a break from radio broadcasting for a while, to receive treatment for a heart condition.
- 23 December – Newsreader Mike Powell presents his first bulletins for the station.

== 2020s ==
=== 2020 ===
- 19 March – Radio 2 launches its fourth decades show, Sounds of the 90s, presented by Fearne Cotton. It is dedicated to hits of that decade.
- 28 March – Huey Morgan and The Radio 2 Rock Show with Johnnie Walker both take breaks from the Radio 2 airwaves.
- 29 March – Claudia Winkleman and Angela Scanlon both take a break from radio broadcasting.
- April – Due to COVID-19, news bulletins are sourced from 5 Live. Three minute bulletins are broadcast on the hour, with extended five minute bulletins at breakfast and early weekday evenings.
- 19 December – Graham Norton presents his final Saturday mid-morning show and leaves the station to join Virgin Radio.

=== 2021 ===
- 3 January – Clare Teal presents her final edition of The Swing & Big Band Show and leaves the station after 15 years. while Anneka Rice hosts her final Sunday late-night show, as she also leaves the station.
- 4 January – Vanessa Feltz's show begins at the new time of 4am.
- 27 February – Claudia Winkleman returns and becomes the new presenter of the Saturday mid-morning show, replacing Graham Norton.
- 6 April – The Radio 2 Breakfast Show begins a new jingles package produced by Wise Buddah Productions. The company has also created new jingles for Claudia Winkleman's Saturday mid-morning show.
- 9–11 April – Following the death of Prince Philip, Duke of Edinburgh, the station abandons half of its regular Friday–Sunday programming in favour of simulcasting the BBC Radio News special programme. From 5pm, the station broadcasts a revised schedule for the rest of the day and over the weekend.

=== 2022 ===
- 13 February – Paul O'Grady takes a break from radio broadcasting for a while. His show, Paul O'Grady on the Wireless, would return on 22 May.
- 20 February – Rob Beckett joins and presents a new Sunday teatime show, which will share its slot with Paul O'Grady, alternating every three months.
- 8 April – The station celebrates the launch of its BBC Sounds service, Radio 2 90s, with a day of music from that decade.
- 14 May – The station broadcasts live coverage of Eurovision 2022 in Turin.
- 22 May – Dr Rangan Chatterjee hosts his final Sunday late-night show, as he leaves the station.
- 18 June – Craig Charles hosts his final House Party show, as he leaves the station to rejoin 6 Music.
- 19 June – Ana Matronic hosts her final Disco & Dance Devotion show, as she leaves the station.
- 1 July – Steve Wright announces that he will step down from his long-running afternoon show in September, but he will continue to present Sunday Love Songs for the station. Scott Mills' new show will air from 2–4pm, giving Sara Cox an extra hour on her drivetime show.
- 8–9 July – Tony Blackburn's Golden Hour broadcasts its final Friday night show, as it moves to Sundays. Sounds of the 80s and Sounds of the 90s broadcast their final Friday night shows, as they move to Saturday evenings. The Radio 2 Rock Show with Johnnie Walker broadcasts its final Saturday night show, as it moves to Friday.
- 15–17 July – Radio 2 launches a new weekend schedule that sees Angela Griffin, DJ Spoony and Michelle Visage presenting regular shows, as they join the station. Visage's Handbag Hits feature broadcasts on her Friday night show for the first time, The Radio 2 Rock Show with Johnnie Walker moves to Friday nights, Sounds of the 80s and Sounds of the 90s move to Saturday nights, and Tony Blackburn's Golden Hour moves to Sunday nights.
- 28 July – Vanessa Feltz announces that she will leave her early morning show and the station on the following day, after 11 years.
- 1 August – An interim Early Breakfast Show begins airing, hosted by an array of guest presenters including Owain Wyn Evans, Nicki Chapman, Katie Piper and YolanDa Brown.
- 9 August – It is announced that Paul O'Grady will step down from his Sunday afternoon show at the end of its current 13-week run.
- 14 August – Paul O'Grady presents his final Sunday afternoon show and leaves the station after 13 years, before his death seven months later.
- 8–19 September – Following the death of Queen Elizabeth II, Radio 2 abandons half of its regular scheduled programming in favour of simulcasting a BBC Radio News special programme. It broadcasts a revised schedule from 9 to 11 September and her state funeral on 19 September. Radio 2 Live in Leeds 2022 is cancelled.
- 30 September – Steve Wright hosts his final afternoon show, as Janey Lee Grace and Tim Smith both leave the station.
- 3–28 October – OJ Borg presents an interim weekday afternoon show between Wright's departure and Mills' arrival.
- 4 October – It is announced that Owain Wyn Evans will replace Vanessa Feltz on the weekday Early Breakfast Show from January 2023. The show will be presented from Cardiff, making it the first weekday Radio 2 programme to move out of London.
- 31 October – Scott Mills begins presenting his weekday afternoon show and Sara Cox her newly-extended drivetime show.

=== 2023 ===
- 9 January – Results of the 21st Century Folk' initiative, launched in February 2022, are revealed along with plans for the station to celebrate Tony Blackburn's 80th birthday. It is also announced that Phil Williams will present a new overnight show from 12am to 3am every Monday, as OJ Borg reduces from five to four nights a week in the same slot. The start date of Owain Wyn Evans' tenure on the Early Breakfast Show is pushed back from January to 13 February.
- 17 January – Ken Bruce announces that, at the end of March, he will step down from hosting his mid-morning show after 31 years and leave the station.
- 13 February – Owain Wyn Evans begins presenting his early breakfast show.
- 24 February – Vernon Kay is announced to be taking over the weekday mid-morning slot from Ken Bruce in May. Bruce's last show is announced to be on 3 March 2023, with Gary Davies presenting during the interim period. Plans are also announced for the station's Radio 2 Celebrates Country initiative including coverage of the C2C Festival.
- 3 March – Ken Bruce presents his final mid-morning show, as he leaves the station after 40 years to join Greatest Hits Radio.
- 6 March – Gary Davies begins presenting an interim mid-morning show and the Ten to the Top quiz feature is broadcast for the first time, replacing PopMaster.
- 15 May – Vernon Kay begins presenting his new weekday mid-morning show.
- 21 October – Steve Wright replaces Paul Gambaccini as presenter of Pick of the Pops, who moves to a new Sunday evening show The Paul Gambaccini Collection.
- 2 December – Claudia Winkleman announces that she will leave the station in March 2024, with Romesh Ranganathan taking over the slot.

=== 2024 ===
- 7 February – The BBC announces plans to launch a new Radio 2 spin-off station on DAB and online via BBC Sounds. The station will focus on music from the 1950s, 60s and 70s in a bid to entice back some of the station's former listeners.
- 10 and 11 February – Steve Wright presents his final editions of Pick of the Pops and Sunday Love Songs, his death is announced on 13 February.
- 18 February – The station broadcasts from Wogan House for what is intended to be the final time after 18 years, as it moves into its new studios in Broadcasting House.
- 2 June – Michael Ball presents his first Sunday Love Songs. Nicki Chapman, Gaby Roslin and Angela Griffin have been the interim presenters following Steve Wright’s death in February. Paddy McGuinness joins the station.
- 6 July – Mark Goodier takes over as presenter of Pick of the Pops from interim presenter Gary Davies, who had covered the show.
- 9 August – Gaby Roslin presents The Radio 2 Breakfast Show after its usual presenter, Zoe Ball, is unexpectedly absent.
- 12 August – Scott Mills temporarily takes over as presenter of The Radio 2 Breakfast Show, while Zoe Ball takes an unannounced six week absence. DJ Spoony and occasionally OJ Borg host Mills' afternoon show during this period.
- 26 August – Radio 2 broadcasts three programmes paying tribute to Steve Wright, on what would have been his 70th birthday, they are presented by Vernon Kay, Liza Tarbuck and Paul Gambaccini.
- 2–6 September – Presenters Jo Whiley, Scott Mills, Trevor Nelson, Vernon Kay and Sara Cox take part in a CBeebies Bedtime Stories takeover.
- 6 October – Johnnie Walker announces that, due to ill health, he is to leave the station after 26 years at the end of the month, bringing his broadcasting career to a close after 58 years.
- 25 and 27 October – Johnnie Walker presents his final editions of The Rock Show and Sounds of the 70s, before his death two months later.
- 1 and 3 November – Shaun Keaveny joins the station to present The Rock Show and Bob Harris takes over Sounds of the 70s.
- 19 November – Zoe Ball announces that she is to step down as host of The Radio 2 Breakfast Show in December, after nearly six years in the role. At the same time, a new weekday daytime schedule is announced which sees Scott Mills succeed Ball as host of The Radio 2 Breakfast Show, while Trevor Nelson's Rhythm Nation will come to an end as he moves to replace Mills on the afternoon show. It is also announced that DJ Spoony will move his show The Good Groove to the weekday late night slot, replacing Rhythm Nation, and Sophie Ellis-Bextor will move her Kitchen Disco to The Good Groove's former Friday late night slot.
- 4 December – Scott Mills presents his last afternoon show.
- 16 December – An interim Early Afternoon Show begins airing, hosted by DJ Spoony and later Richie Anderson, followed by OJ Borg.
- 19 December – Ofcom writes to Radio 2 to give notice that it intends to conduct a full competition assessment into its expansion plans.
- 20 December – Zoe Ball presents her final Radio 2 Breakfast Show.
- 24 December – An interim Breakfast Show begins airing, hosted by Gaby Roslin and later by Mark Goodier and OJ Borg.

=== 2025 ===
- 2 January – Trevor Nelson presents the final edition of Rhythm Nation as the show comes to an end.
- 6–23 January – An interim Late Night Show airs, hosted for the first week by DJ Spoony and all subsequent weeks by Angellica Bell.
- 27 January – The Scott Mills Breakfast Show begins, while Trevor Nelson starts presenting weekday early afternoons. Nelson's 10pm–12am Monday to Thursday slot is taken over by The Good Groove with DJ Spoony.
- 31 January – Sophie Ellis Bextor's Kitchen Disco begins in its new two-hour Friday night slot.
- 18 February – A series of weekend schedule changes alongside details of special programming to air across the Spring are released. The changes announce that, from May, Zoe Ball will host a new show on Saturday afternoons from 1–3pm, displacing Pick of the Pops which will move to a new time slot of Sundays 5−7pm, while Rob Beckett leaves the station. Additionally, Richie Anderson will host a new Sunday night into Monday morning show in April, replacing Phil Williams who leaves the station. Seasonal highlights include celebrations of Elaine Paige's 60 year career and annual C2C: Country to Country coverage.
- 1 June – Due to what is described as "human error", the station repeats the 25 May edition of Elaine Paige on Sunday rather than playing the latest edition; it is made available subsequently on BBC Sounds.
- 2 July – Ofcom officially rejects the BBC's plans to launch a spin-off station, due to the potential impact on commercial stations such as Boom Radio.
- 13 December – Zoe Ball announces that she will be stepping down from her Saturday afternoon show after seven months, with her final show airing the following week and Emma Willis replacing her in the new year.
- 20 December – Zoe Ball presents her final Saturday afternoon show.

=== 2026 ===
- 17 January – Emma Willis presents her first Saturday afternoon show.
- 11 March – After a seven week absence, Liza Tarbuck announces that she has left the station with her final show having already aired.
- 25 March–3 July – Gary Davies presents The Radio 2 Breakfast Show on an interim basis.
- 30 March – The BBC announces the sacking of Scott Mills from Radio 2 over allegations regarding his 'personal conduct', having presented his last show on 24 March.
- 23 April – The BBC announces that Sara Cox will take over as presenter of The Radio 2 Breakfast Show from the Summer, with a presenter to replace her on the drivetime show to be confirmed at a later date.
- 4 May – Kirsten O'Brien joins the station as the new weekday afternoon traffic reporter (but for Monday to Thursday only), having presented shows for BBC Radio Berkshire for eight years.
- 4 June
  - It is announced that Bob Harris has left the station after nearly 30 years, and retired from broadcasting due to ill health. Shaun Keaveny is announced as Harris’ replacement on Sounds of the 70s having covered the show for a few months in Harris’ absence, while Darius Rucker who had been doing the same on The Country Show is said to be continuing on an interim basis.
  - Several schedule changes are announced for Saturday nights with Sounds of the 80s with Gary Davies moving to the new timeslot of 6–8pm replacing Liza Tarbuck. Sounds of the 90s with Fearne Cotton also moved to a new timeslot of 8–10pm while Dance Sounds of the 90s with Vernon Kay will air from 10–11pm and Alternative Sounds of the 90s with Dermot O’Leary will air from 11pm–12am.
- 12 June – Sara Cox presents her final drivetime show for Radio 2 before taking a break ahead of taking over the breakfast show from 6 July.
- 15 June – An interim Drivetime show begins airing, presented by a series of guest presenters including Mark Goodier, Ellie Taylor, Richie Anderson, Alex Jones, Angela Scanlon, Joel Dommett, Jason Manford, Gary Davies and Owain Wyn Evans.
- 26 June – Trevor Nelson announces he is taking a break from broadcasting due to "health issues". His afternoon show is temporarily covered by DJ Spoony, whose late-night show The Good Groove is deputised by Melvin Odoom. Nelson returns on 7 September.
- 6 July – Sara Cox begins presenting the breakfast show.
- 28 September – Angela Scanlon is announced as the new host of Radio 2 Drivetime from November, returning to the station on a full-time basis after a five year absence. Ben Earle is also announced as the new host of The Country Show from an unspecified date. Ellie Taylor, who had begun covering for Emma Willis the previous week, is announced to be hosting her show throughout the Autumn and Winter whilst Willis takes absence to present Strictly Come Dancing.
- 7 October – Radio 2 apologises after presenter Melvin Odoom played a tribute to musician George Benson after Radio 2's 11pm news on 5 October reported the death of composer George Fenton.
