= Melodies for You =

Radio music programme

- Genre: Music
- Running time: 90 minutes
- Country of origin: United Kingdom
- Home station: BBC Light Programme; BBC Radio 2
- Hosted by: Eric Robinson (1967–1971); Kenneth Alwyn (1971–1972); Sam Costa (1972–1974); David Jacobs (1974–1984); Robin Boyle (1985–1986); Richard Baker (1986–1995, 1999-2003); Hugh Scully (1996–1999); Brian Kay (2003–2004); Sheridan Morley (2004-2006); Alan Titchmarsh (2007-2011)

Melodies for You is a long-running BBC radio music programme, broadcast on Sunday mornings until 1992 and subsequently on Sunday evenings. It presented works of light popular and classical music.

The show was merged with Your Hundred Best Tunes in 2007 by BBC Radio 2's controller Lesley Douglas, who appointed Alan Titchmarsh as presenter. The show was then dropped by controller Bob Shennan with the final broadcast on Sunday, 28 August 2011.

In the final broadcast, Alan Titchmarsh played personal favourites:

1. Gilbert Vinter and his Orchestra – The Arcadians Overture
2. Edita Gruberová – Der Holle Rache
3. Black Dyke Mills Band – The Titchmarsh Warbler
4. The New London Orchestra – Knightsbridge March
5. Iona Brown – The Lark Ascending
6. Jussi Bjoerling and Robert Merrill – Pearl Fishers Duet
7. Peter Skellern and Richard Stilgoe – Joyce the Librarian
8. The Band of Her Majesty's Royal Marines – Sunset
9. New Symphony Orchestra of London – The Nightmare Song from Isidore
10. Pat Metheny – Always and Forever
11. Thomas Round – Love Unspoken from The Merry Widow
12. BBC Concert Orchestra – Leap Year Waltz
13. Philharmonia Orchestra – Rose Adagio
14. Joyce Grenfell – Old Tyme Dancing
15. Manchester Children's Choir – Nymphs and Shepherds from The Libertine
16. Royal Philharmonic Orchestra – Pride and Prejudice
17. Shirley Jones and Gordon MacRae – If I Loved You
18. Huddersfield Choral Society and Orchestra – Hallelujah Chorus
