= Sunday Night at 10 =

- Genre: Big band music
- Running time: Sundays, 10:00pm-11:00pm
- Country of origin: United Kingdom
- Language: English
- Home station: BBC Radio 2
- Starring: Malcolm Laycock (1995–2009); Clare Teal (2009-13)
- Produced by: Bob McDowall; Caroline Snook
- Original release: 19 April 1995 – 29 September 2013
- Audio format: FM and Digital radio and online

Sunday Night At 10, also known as The Age of Swing, is a weekly hour long programme on BBC Radio 2 in the United Kingdom. Aired on Sunday evenings at 10pm, it featured big band music from the late 1930s and early 1940s through to the present day. Presented by jazz singer Clare Teal it regularly drew a weekly listening audience of 360,000. The programme was subsumed into a two-hour show after its content was merged with that of Big Band Special in September 2013.

== Show format ==
The programme began shortly after the conclusion of the news at 10:00pm. Clare Teal outlined some of the artists who would be featured on that particular evening. The show often had a theme running through it by which many of the songs played were connected. The details of each song, such as composer, album on which it was available, etc., were given after it had been played and the information placed on the show's website after Sunday Night at 10 had finished. The show generally ended with the presenter reading out a list of big band concerts which would be held at venues around the United Kingdom during the coming week, after which the show concluded and handed over for the 11:00pm news. The edition was then available on the BBC website to be listened to again for the following seven days.

== History ==
The programme began in 1998 and based its format on the long-running Dance Band Days presented by Alan Dell. Following Dell's death Malcolm Laycock began to present the show on Sunday evenings, and for many years it featured a mixture of music from British dance bands of the 20s and 30s and from the big band era. The first half of the show was usually dedicated to the British dance bands of artists such as Jack Hylton and Geraldo, while the second half would feature the music of bandleaders such as Glenn Miller and Tommy Dorsey. In addition, the show would feature interviews with occasional guests from the big band genre and a "Mystery Disc" where a piece of music would be played and listeners would be asked to guess the identity of a mystery artist. It would conclude with Laycock reading out a list of big band concerts taking place around the United Kingdom.

In November 2008 the show's format was altered, switching the focus to mostly big band music, though it continued to close with the concert announcements. The decision to alter the show led to complaints from some listeners who believed Radio 2 was turning its back on its older audience.

In July 2009 Laycock announced his departure from the station. He had been due to take a four-week holiday, but instead took the impromptu decision to leave after failing to negotiate a new contract. His announcement took his bosses by surprise. He presented his final edition of Sunday Night At 10 on 26 July 2009. His sudden departure prompted outraged listeners to write to Radio 2 controller Bob Shennan and even their local MPs in an attempt to bring him back. Shennan later said that he had tried to persuade Laycock not to resign, but without success. Laycock went on to claim in a newspaper interview that he had been constructively dismissed by Radio 2. The BBC denied this and said his departure had occurred because they were unable to meet his demand for a 60 per cent pay rise.

Clare Teal took over the show from the following Sunday, 2 August. The BBC said that the programme would continue, while Bob Shennan said that it would not be scrapped. Teal presented the programme until September 2013, after which it was merged with Big Band Special (also presented by Teal), creating a two-hour show airing on Sunday evenings from 9–11pm. This programme was also fronted by Teal.

British dance band music made a return to the show from November 2009, albeit not to the same extent as previously. An entire show was also dedicated to the genre in December 2009.

== Presenters ==
- Malcolm Laycock (1995–2009)
- Clare Teal (2009–2013)
