= Malcolm Laycock =

English radio presenter, radio producer (1938–2009)

- Born: Malcolm Richard Laycock; 1 November 1938; Keighley, England
- Died: 8 November 2009 (aged 71); London, England
- Spouse: Liz Laycock (died 2009)
- Children: 2
- Career
- Style: Broadcaster and producer
- Country: United Kingdom

Malcolm Richard Laycock (1 November 1938 – 8 November 2009) was an English radio presenter who hosted jazz, big band, and dance band programmes for BBC Radio 2 and the BBC World Service.

== Early life ==
Malcolm Laycock was born in Keighley, West Riding of Yorkshire, where his parents owned a grocer's shop. He attended Bradford Grammar School after gaining a scholarship, and was a contemporary and friend of the artist David Hockney. He trained as a teacher at Goldsmiths College in London, and in 1962 was elected President of the student union. After graduating he taught at schools in south London, including the William Penn School in Dulwich, where he established a radio station for excluded pupils. He eventually rose to become deputy head of Peckham School, but his work with radio brought him to the attention of Radio London and he joined the BBC in the late 1960s. In 1971, he was seconded to Radio London as an education producer.

== Broadcasting career ==
During a broadcasting career spanning four decades, Laycock presented jazz-related programmes for both BBC Radio London (for which he worked for 20 years) and later the BBC World Service. At Radio London, he produced a nightly magazine programme for black listeners, Black Londoners, and helped to improve the station's coverage of minority and community affairs. As a presenter for the World Service, he hosted a number of shows, including Jazz for the Asking, several series of Kings of Swing, The Big Band Singers, and the documentary Glenn Miller – The Legacy. He also helped to establish the former London-based radio station 102.2 Jazz FM, where he became the programme controller.

His other credits included documentaries on performers such as Nat King Cole, Ted Heath, Joe Loss and Gilbert Becaud (whom Laycock interviewed on the singer's yacht in the south of France). He also presented a documentary about Billie Holiday, Billie Holiday in Her Own Words (for which he won a Sony Award).

In 1992, along with fellow broadcaster Dave Gelly, Laycock established a production company devoted to making programmes about vintage jazz and popular music. Encore Radio was one of the first companies to take advantage of restructuring at the BBC which opened its radio networks to independent producers, and it operated for six years.

He began presenting on Radio 2 in 1994, when he started filling in for the ill Alan Dell on his Dance Band Days show, and following Dell's death in 1995, he took over the Sunday afternoon slot on the network. In 1998, Dance Band Days was subsumed into a Sunday evening programme and became Sunday Night at 10. Laycock's presenting style and vast musical knowledge quickly made him popular with listeners, and the programme would regularly draw a weekly listening audience of 360,000. For many years, the show featured a mixture of music from British dance bands of the 1920s and '30s and from the big band era. However, in November 2008 its format was altered to focus mainly on swing bands from the late 1930s and early 1940s to the present day. The decision led to complaints from the programme's listeners, who believed that Radio 2 was no longer catering for its older listeners. Laycock himself later said that he had been ordered to drop the British dance bands part of his show.

Following a dispute with BBC management over his salary, Laycock announced his departure from the station at the end of July 2009. He had been due to take a four-week holiday, but instead decided to leave after failing to negotiate a new contract. He later claimed in a newspaper interview to have been constructively dismissed by Radio 2. The BBC denied this was the case, and said his departure had occurred because they were unable to meet his demand for a pay rise (from a salary of £24,000) of 60%.

He presented his final edition of Sunday Night at 10 on 26 July 2009, announcing his departure on air, a move that took his bosses by surprise. Clare Teal took over the show from the following Sunday, 2 August.

Laycock's departure prompted outraged listeners to write to Radio 2 controller Bob Shennan, and even their local MPs, in an attempt to bring him back. It was also lamented by the magazine The Oldie. Shennan later said that he had tried to persuade Laycock not to resign, but without success.

== Other work ==
Away from broadcasting, Laycock was President of the Frank Sinatra Society, and the Big Bands Windsor Appreciation Society. He was also vice-president of the Syd Lawrence Society and regularly travelled with the Syd Lawrence Orchestra to compère their concerts. He compiled many CD reissues and wrote essays for the sleeve notes. In addition he wrote a column for the magazine Big Bands International, and was briefly editor of the short-lived 1990s publication Jazz Magazine International.

== Personal life and death ==
Laycock's wife Liz died of cancer in July 2009. They had two sons, Dominic and Andrew. Andrew is a member of the a cappella vocal group The Flying Pickets.

Malcolm Laycock died on 8 November 2009, aged 71, after having been ill with emphysema and pneumonia. Radio 2 controller Bob Shennan said that former colleagues were "shocked and saddened" to hear the news of his death, and paying tribute to him, Shennan said, "Malcolm was a much-loved and highly respected broadcaster, renowned for his skill as a presenter and producer, and his passion for music and radio."

As part of a tribute programme to him, on Sunday 15 November BBC Radio 2 repeated an edition of Sunday Night at 10 from April 2009, in which Laycock had celebrated his 700th programme in the series by playing some of his favourite tracks from the big band era.

Preceded by None	Presenter of Sunday Night at 10; 1995–2009	Succeeded by Clare Teal
