= Deb Grant =

Irish-born British radio presenter and DJ

- Born: Deborah Grant; Dublin, Ireland
- Other name: Anne Frankenstein (formerly)
- Occupations: Radio presenter; DJ; Columnist
- Years active: 2010s–present
- Website: djdebgrant.com

Deborah Grant is an Irish radio DJ and music journalist based in the UK. She is a primary broadcaster on BBC Radio 6 Music, where she hosts the flagship weekday evening show New Music Fix Daily.

== Early life and identity ==
Grant was born and raised in Dublin, Ireland. She has identified herself as an "atheist Irish Jew," noting that her Jewish heritage and her grandfather's history as a touring jazz saxophonist significantly influenced her musical trajectory. Growing up in Dublin during the 1990s, she was a dedicated listener of the city's pirate radio scene, particularly Spectrum 101 (which evolved into Phantom FM), and cites RTÉ's John Kelly as a major broadcasting inspiration. She moved to London at age 18 to study music, initially working in various administrative roles while DJing in the capital's club circuit.

== Career ==
Before joining the BBC, Grant broadcast under the pseudonym Anne Frankenstein. Under this name, she became a presenter on Jazz FM, hosting the Late Night Jazz show and Sunday Drive. Her broadcasting style was characterised by her knowledge of rare groove, funk, and soul. She eventually moved away from the moniker to broadcast under her birth name upon joining the BBC full-time.

=== BBC Radio 6 Music and New Music Fix ===
Grant joined BBC Radio 6 Music as a regular presenter in 2023. She was initially paired with Tom Ravenscroft to launch New Music Fix Daily (Monday–Thursday, 7pm–9pm), a show focused on breaking new artists and curation of the station's New Music Fix Playlist. Following Ravenscroft's departure from the station in May 2025, Grant was joined by new co-presenter Nathan Shepherd. Shepherd, who rose to prominence through viral music mash-ups and his Indie Forever show, now hosts the programme alongside Grant, focusing on a mix of indie and experimental new releases.

=== Other work ===
Grant is a contributor to The Big Issue and has written extensively for various vinyl culture publications. In 2025, Grant and Shepherd were prominent faces of the BBC's coverage of the Glastonbury Festival and the Mercury Prize.
