= Alan Dell =

British broadcaster

Alan Dell, born Alan Creighton Mandell (20 March 1924 – 18 August 1995), was a BBC radio broadcaster, associated in particular with dance band music of the 1920s, 1930s and early 1940s.

== Formative years ==
Dell was born in Cape Town, South Africa, son of Creighton Mandell, of Johannesburg, and graduated from Kearsney College in Natal. He joined the South African Broadcasting Corporation in 1943, introducing for several years a programme called Rhythm Club. Moving to England in the 1950s, Dell worked on Radio Luxembourg (which then had recording studios in London), the BBC Light Programme and its successor Radio 2, until shortly before his death, aged 71.

== The Dance Band Days ==
Dell's most celebrated programme, The Dance Band Days, ran from 1969 (initially on Radio 1) until 1995 and, in later years, did so in a sequence on Monday evenings with Dell's "other side", The Big Band Sound. The former included recordings by the likes of Jack Hylton, Ambrose, Henry Hall, Geraldo and other British dance band leaders. The main elements of these programmes were retained for a number of years after Dell's death, in a Sunday night programme introduced on Radio 2 by Malcolm Laycock. DJ John Peel, known for his promotion of progressive rock and other cutting-edge music, was an admirer of Dell's broadcasting style and regularly pointed his listeners to Dell's dance-band show.

== Other work for the BBC ==
Though Dell mostly presented programmes of music from the dance band and swing eras, he was also an early presenter of Pick of the Pops in 1956 and, in his later years, of Sounds Easy, a Sunday afternoon programme on Radio 2 which was notable for its attention to the recordings of Frank Sinatra and Peggy Lee (both of whom he pre-deceased) and Henry Mancini with the "Mancini moment". Dell won a 1983 Grammy Award in the Best Historical Album category for The Tommy Dorsey/Frank Sinatra Sessions - Vols. 1, 2 & 3. Dell provided the sleeve notes for the mid-1980 British EMI CD re-releases of Sinatra's records, and Dance Bands UK (1988), a BBC compact disc of stereophonic transfers by sound engineer, Robert Parker (1936–2004) for the Australian Broadcasting Corporation.
