= Friday Night Is Music Night =

BBC radio programme

- Genre: Orchestral music; Light music
- Running time: 2 hours
- Country of origin: United Kingdom
- Language: English
- Home station: BBC Light Programme (1953–1967); BBC Radio 2 (1967–2023); BBC Radio 3 (2024–present)
- Original release: 25 September 1953
- Audio format: Stereo
- Website: www.bbc.co.uk/programmes/b006wrrv

Friday Night Is Music Night (known as Sunday Night Is Music Night on BBC Radio 2 from 2020 to 2023) is a long-running live BBC radio concert programme featuring the BBC Concert Orchestra, broadcast from 1953 to 2023 on the BBC Light Programme and its successor BBC Radio 2, moving to BBC Radio 3 from April 2024.

The programme is the world's longest-running live orchestral music radio programme (although there were no new editions during the first part of the Coronavirus pandemic in 2020).

== Format ==
Friday Night Is Music Night traditionally begins with the orchestra playing the first bars of an adapted version of Charles Williams's High Adventure. After the fanfare, the compère gives a summary of the programme, before reciting the slogan of the title. This happened again at the close of the programme, with the announcer usually ending on "I hope that once again we have proved that Friday Night is Music Night"

The programme features many types of music, including classical music, light music, film music, theatre music, songs from the musicals, and opera and operetta. It is also notable for its arrangements of popular standards, swing, jazz, and folksongs. One of its biggest appeals is its unpredictable playlist, which is left unrevealed until broadcast.

The programme features guest artists from musical theatre, opera or popular music; in the 1970s and 1980s, singers John Lawrenson and Cynthia Glover were the programme's resident musical artists. Occasionally, artists such as Donny Osmond and Alanis Morissette performed in the larger venues. The programme also showcased certain sections of the orchestra and features guest instrumentalists, for example the BBC Big Band.

It was broadcast live from many theatres and concert halls throughout the UK, although regularly from the Mermaid Theatre in London, the Watford Colosseum, or the Hackney Empire. The show was not broadcast live every week, but instead previous shows were repeated later in the year when the orchestra was on tour.

== History ==
The programme has run since 1953, first on the BBC Light Programme until 1967, then on its successor, BBC Radio 2 until 2023, and since 2024 on BBC Radio 3. It is the world's longest-running live orchestral music radio programme. Many attribute the programme's format to the composer and conductor Sidney Torch. In particular, it was notable in its later years on Radio 2 for being one of the few programmes on that station still to feature light music. The show's executive producer was Anthony Cherry for over 40 years.

From the early 1970s onwards it was fronted by Robin Boyle, who, it was later said, "came to be the linchpin of the programme". Other presenters included Kenneth Alwyn, Richard Baker, Aled Jones, Clare Teal, Ken Bruce, Jimmy Kingsbury, Brian Kay, Paul Gambaccini and Russell Davies. Following its move to Radio 3 in 2024, Katie Derham and Petroc Trelawny were announced as hosts.

In 2005, the programme was televised for the first time on BBC Four as part of a 1940s' and 1950s' theme night, with a playlist concentrating on classic light music by composers such as Eric Coates, Trevor Duncan, Ronald Binge and Leroy Anderson. The compère was actor and comedian Roy Hudd. On Friday 19 March 2010, the programme was broadcast from the BBC Television Centre in Shepherd's Bush for the first time.

From April 2020, due to the COVID-19 pandemic, repeats of the programme were broadcast on Sunday nights between 7pm and 9pm, under the title of Sunday Night Is Music Night, as no new editions could be recorded during the first stages of the pandemic. There were few new editions broadcast after August 2021 and the Sunday Night is Music Night label was last used on Radio 2 for a celebration of the music of Doctor Who presented by Jo Whiley with the BBC National Orchestra of Wales in October 2023.

In February 2024, it was announced that the programme would move to BBC Radio 3 and return to its original name Friday Night Is Music Night, as a showcase for the BBC Concert Orchestra. The relaunch concert at Alexandra Palace was also broadcast on television. Radio 2 however will continue to air occasional 'Sunday Night is Music Night' specials.
