= Robin Boyle =

Robin James Boyle (27 March 1927 – 25 July 2003) was a British broadcaster and BBC radio presenter.

== Early life ==
Born in Folkestone, Kent, Boyle's parents moved to Ireland while he was still young. He enlisted at the age of 15 into the Inns of Court regiment of the army where he worked in reconnaissance and was active in the Normandy landings as well as being one of the first across the Rhine. After the War he became part of the British Forces Network. It was here that he learnt his trade as a radio presenter and met his future wife Nancy Pomeroy.

== Career ==
Although best known as presenter of Friday Night is Music Night, Boyle did occasional shifts on Radio 4 in the early days including a number of overnight news reading shifts. When Boyle worked for the BFN in Hamburg he progressed from announcer to Head of Presentation.

He also worked on several light entertainment programs such as The Navy Lark and Hancock's Half Hour. He was described as 'possessing a public voice and persona that took listeners of a certain age gracefully back to another era. He also possessed a certain charisma which could have led him to be described as a 'matinee idol'. Towards the end of his career, Boyle worked alongside the RAF Benevolent Fund and Cancer Research, becoming a life governor in 1988 and subsequently a Freeman of the City of London. He ended his career having spent more than 50 years in the BBC upon his retirement in 1998. He died in Sleaford, Lincolnshire.

Award	Date
Sony Radio Award	1989
Silver Sony Radio Award	1993

== See also ==
- Friday Night is Music Night
