= Big Band Special =

BBC Radio 2 program since 1979

Big Band Special is a BBC Radio 2 series which launched in September 1979, as a showcase for the BBC Big Band in session and in concert. Big Band Special was a 30-minute programme broadcast on Monday nights at 9.30pm and presented by Clare Teal from April 2006. Big Band Special was also available to listen to for a further seven days following each broadcast via the BBC iPlayer.

== History ==
Originally planned as a short run of 12 programmes, Big Band Special was the first jazz showcase on BBC Radio for the BBC Big Band. For most of its first decade, Big Band Special was made up of studio sessions featuring the BBC Big Band with guest vocalists and jazz soloists. From the 1990s onwards, concerts from all parts of the United Kingdom and beyond became a regular part of Big Band Special. Presented by Sheila Tracy from 1979 until 2000, other presenters have included Stacey Kent (2001–2004) and Helen Mayhew (2004–2006). Jazz singer Ian Shaw also presented editions of the programme.

Big Band Special embraced a diverse mix of repertoire, ranging from the 1930s sounds of Duke Ellington, Fletcher Henderson and Jimmie Lunceford, through the swing era to the modern sounds of leading jazz writers including Francy Boland, Bob Brookmeyer, John Clayton, Bob Florence, Steve Gray, Bill Holman, Jörg Achim Keller, Rob McConnell and Gerry Mulligan.

Conductors featured regularly on Big Band Special included American jazz trombonist Jiggs Whigham, British arrangers Mark Nightingale and Steve Sidwell, the BBC Big Band's baritone saxophonist Jay Craig and Jörg Achim Keller.

In September 2013, BBC Radio 2 announced it would overhaul its schedule, merging its two Big Band themed programmes – Big Band Special and Sunday Night at 10 – to create a two-hour show airing on Sunday evenings from 9–11pm. Like both its predecessors, this programme was also presented by Clare Teal.
