= BBC Radio 6 Music =

British national alternative music radio station

Coordinates: 51.5192°N 0.1427°W

- Logo used since 2022
- London, Salford and Cardiff; United Kingdom
- Frequencies: DAB: 12B BBC National DAB; Freesat: 707; Freeview: 707; Sky (UK only): 0118; Virgin Media: 909; Virgin Media Ireland: 912; Astra 2E (28.2°E); Intelsat 901 (18°W)

Programming
- Language: English
- Format: Alternative/indie

Ownership
- Owner: BBC
- Operator: BBC North (Salford); BBC Radio (London)
- Sister stations: BBC Radio 2 BBC Radio 6 Indie Forever

History
- First air date: 11 March 2002; 24 years ago
- Former names: BBC 6 Music (2002–2011)

Technical information
- Licensing authority: Ofcom

Links
- Website: BBC Radio 6 Music via BBC Sounds

BBC Radio 6 Music is a British digital radio station owned and operated by the BBC. It primarily plays a wide range of alternative music, from established and emerging artists and bands. In 2002 it was the first national music radio station to be launched by the BBC in 32 years. It is available only on digital media: DAB radio, BBC Sounds, digital television, and throughout northern and western Europe through the Astra 2E satellite.

BBC Radio 6 Music has been described as a "dedicated alternative music station". Many presenters have argued against the perception that the main focus is indie guitar music. The station itself describes its output as "the cutting-edge music of today, the iconic and groundbreaking music of the past 60 years and access to the BBC's wonderful music archive". Its format resembles eclectic radio as seen in other countries, as while there is a programmed playlist there is a wide range of music genres played on the station with pop, rock, dance, electronic, indie, hip-hop, R&B, punk, funk, grime, metal, soul, ska, house, reggae, jazz, blues, world, techno, experimental and many others played regularly on the station. In addition, there is a greater degree of presenter choice in relation to the programmed playlist compared with other BBC radio stations and especially with commercial radio. Since 2014, an annual music festival, 6 Music Festival, has been held; initially staged in cities around the UK and broadcast live on the station, since 2023, the festival has been staged annually in Greater Manchester as a more scaled-back event.

In July 2010, the BBC Trust announced it had rejected a proposal by the BBC to close 6 Music to provide commercial rivals more room. The Trust commented that the station was "well-liked by its listeners, was highly distinctive and made an important contribution". In 2018, 6 Music was the most listened-to digital-only radio station, with an average weekly audience of 2.53 million.

6 Music operates a spin off 'stream', Radio 6 Indie Forever, dedicated to indie rock, indie pop and classic indie music, broadcasting exclusively on BBC Sounds.

According to RAJAR, the station broadcasts to a weekly audience of 2.7 million with a listening share of 2.5% as of December 2024.

== History ==
BBC 6 Music was proposed in October 2000 as a "digital-only" radio station with the working title "Network Y". ("Network X" became BBC Radio 1Xtra and "Network Z" became BBC 7, now named BBC Radio 4 Extra).

The BBC 6 Music logo at the time of its launch, used from 11 March 2002 to 22 October 2007

The station opened at 7 a.m., Monday 11 March 2002, with a show presented by Phill Jupitus. At the start-up, presenters included Liz Kershaw, Andrew Collins, Tom Robinson, Gideon Coe, Janice Long, Chris Hawkins, Gary Burton, Craig Charles, Stuart Maconie, Brinsley Forde, Suggs, Clare McDonnell, Bruce Dickinson, Tracey MacLeod, Sean Hughes, and Bob Harris. The first record played was Ash's Burn Baby Burn.

6 Music attracted criticism for changing daytime schedules during late 2007 and early 2008, notably including replacing Gideon Coe on the mid morning slot with George Lamb. In response, Lesley Douglas, Controller of BBC Radio 2 and 6 Music at the time, said that the changes were intended to attract more female listeners. She claimed that "men tend to be more interested in the intellectual side of the music, the tracks, where albums have been made, that sort of thing". This in turn brought on more criticism of perceived sexism on Douglas' part.

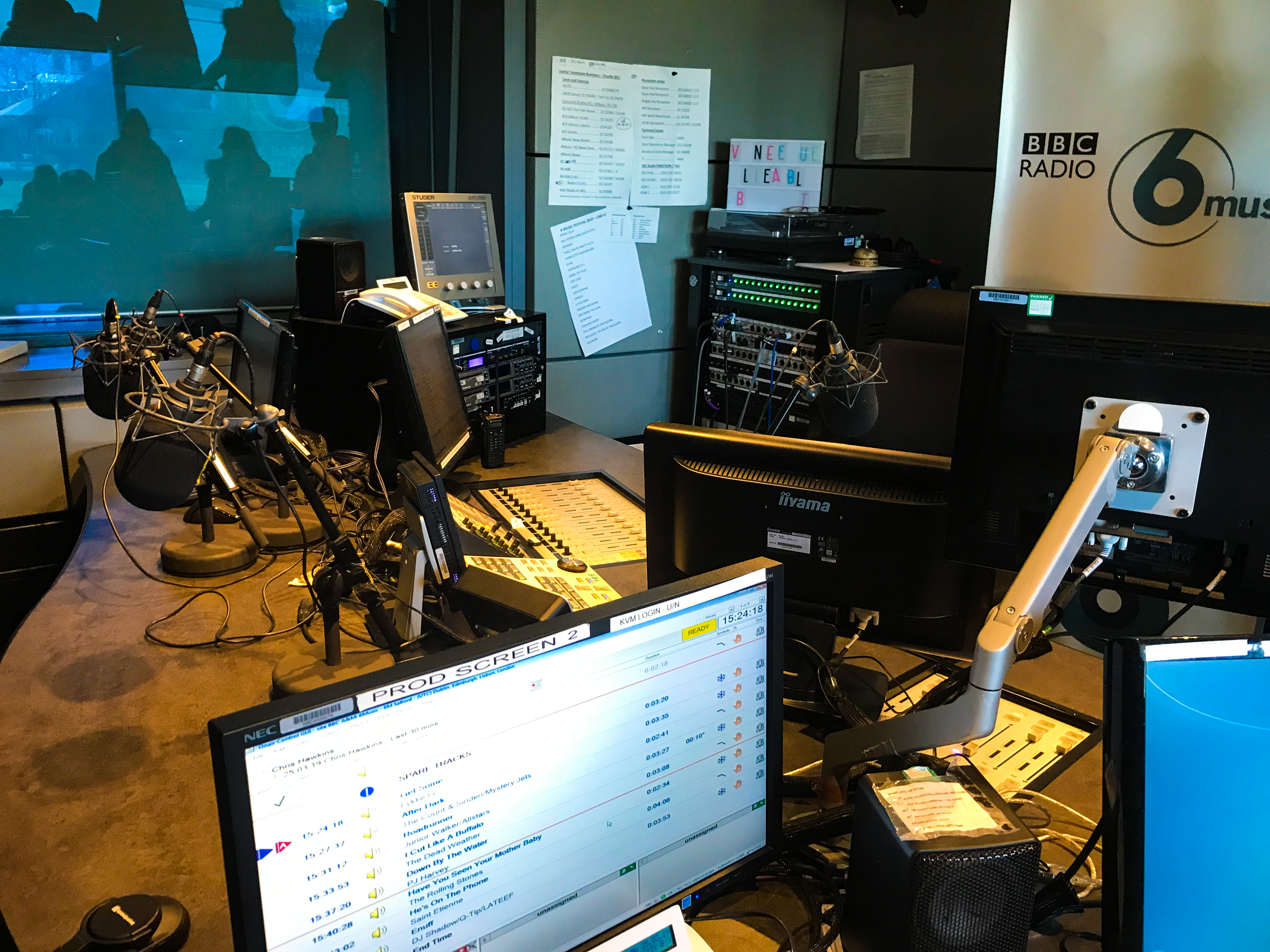
A BBC Radio 6 Music studio in Salford

In March 2006, BBC 6 Music moved from Broadcasting House to new studios in the adjacent Wogan House (then called Western House) to allow the regeneration of Broadcasting House.

In 2011, BBC Radio 6 Music started the process of moving some of its presenters, staff, and shows from London and elsewhere to the new studios at MediaCityUK in Salford near Manchester. The studios are located on the ground floor of Dock House. Among programmes broadcast there are Radcliffe & Maconie, The Craig Charles Funk and Soul Show, and Marc Riley's and Mary Anne Hobbs' shows.

=== Proposed closure ===
The BBC Radio 6 Music logo, 22 October 2007–14 January 2022

In February 2010, in anticipation of a review by the BBC Trust, newspaper reports suggested 6 Music might be axed. The review stopped short of recommending closure but noted that only one in five UK residents were aware the station existed, and that it lacked presenters with credibility as music experts. The Times claimed that Mark Thompson, Director General of the BBC, proposed closure as part of a bid to scale back BBC operations and allow commercial rivals more room. A high-profile campaign to oppose closure of the station attracted media attention and led to "#SaveBBC6Music" quickly becoming a trending topic on Twitter. A leading voice in the campaign was Jarvis Cocker, the lead singer for the British band Pulp who presented his own show on BBC 6 Music, Jarvis Cocker's Sunday Service. A Facebook group set up to oppose the proposed closure gained nearly 180,000 members. A campaign was launched to get the song "Joy Division Oven Gloves" by Half Man Half Biscuit to No. 6 in the UK Singles Chart on 12 April 2010; it entered the Singles Chart that week at No. 56 and the Independent Singles Chart at No. 3.

The Sunday Times reported that following the public outcry over the proposed closure, 6 Music would be rebranded as Radio 2 Extra, retaining a similar playlist but broadcasting for only 12 hours a day but Tim Davie, head of audio and music at the BBC, denied this was a possibility.

Five months after rumours of closure first emerged, the BBC Trust announced that it was not convinced by the BBC Executive's plans and that the station would not be closed.

In the first quarter of 2011 some BBC radio services, including 6 Music, were part of an efficiency review conducted by John Myers. His role, according to Andrew Harrison, the chief executive of RadioCentre, was "to identify both areas of best practice and possible savings." The Telegraph suggested that this was due to 'commercial sector criticism' whilst The Guardian cited a National Audit Office report.

BASCA was actively circulating petitions challenging the BBC's plan to close down 6 Music.

=== 2020s ===
In 2020, Paul Rodgers, the senior head of commissioning for 6 Music left the station, and was replaced by Samantha Moy as the Head of Station. Moy has made a series of schedule changes, presiding over an "undeniable culture shift at the station".

Some music executives have questioned the overall strategy at the digital station since 2020, raising doubts about initiatives such as all-day pop programming, stating it to be "more typical of a commercial network rather than a BBC station", with listeners commenting that themed days are "a sign that they're running out of ideas".

In 2021, Shaun Keaveny left after 14 years of presenting, saying he was "forced out onto the ice floe like an elderly Inuit relative". Due to audience complaints, the BBC issued a statement that "Radio networks always evolve over time".

In 2023, long-serving presenters Gideon Coe and Marc Riley had their hours cut to make way for a new evening programme called New Music Fix Daily with Deb Grant and Tom Ravenscroft, reducing the hours of new alternative music on the BBC weekly from 20 to eight. Stewart Lee described the move as "a land grab on the sound and attitude that have given the station credibility and purpose", with insiders stated the move would 'rip the heart out of' the station.

Some listeners believe the station changes are due to "ageism" and a drive to win younger listeners, and despite the BBC's service review of 6 Music suggesting more might be done to attract older listeners, the current network strategy is aimed at growing audiences aged between 25 and 44. Some listeners who campaigned to save the station in 2010 believe the changes are "completely at variance to what we campaigned for, both musically and in its general tone".

In September 2023, Steve Lamacq announced he was to step down from presenting the daily drivetime programme but would return in January 2024 with a Monday drivetime programme. Huw Stephens took over Lamacq's slot on Tuesdays to Fridays.

On 11 February 2024, 6 Music broadcast from Wogan House for the final time after 18 years, with Gideon Coe sitting in for Cerys Matthews. The station has now returned to new studios inside Broadcasting House.

In January 2025, Lauren Laverne announced that she would be moving back to the mid-morning slot, with Nick Grimshaw replacing her as the new breakfast show host. Grimshaw had already been covering for Laverne on the show for 4 months following her cancer diagnosis.

In February 2026, 6 Music announced plans to launch a BBC Sounds extension focusing on indie rock and pop music, ranging from the 1980s to the present day. On 8 July 2026, the BBC confirmed that the new stream would be called 6 Music Indie Forever, and would feature shows such as The Morning Session co-hosted by Steve Lamacq and the Maccabees guitarist Felix White. On 22 July 2026, the stream was made available exclusively on BBC Sounds.

== Statistics ==
=== Ratings and listenership ===
In February 2010, 6 Music was reported as showing growth in its audience, winning an audience of 695,000 listeners over the first quarter, up 12.3% year-on-year. However, in the quarter to December 2009, its "reach" (proportion of the adult population who listen for at least five minutes in the course of an average week) was 1%, and Total Survey Area share (of total listening time) was 0.4%.

According to the BBC's service review of Radio 2 and 6 Music, published in February 2010, the average age of 6 Music listeners was 36, which led the authors to suggest more might be done to attract older listeners, considering the station played a broad range of music from the 1960s to the present day. The review also claimed that the deficiency in appeal to female listeners apparent in 2007 was still in existence, and that there should be changes to attract more listeners from ethnic minorities and lower income groups. However, the review did not give details of the scale of these issues.

Following the proposal to close the station, online listening figures rose significantly. The number of weekly unique online listeners rose to an average of 133,653 in March 2010, up 50 per cent on the previous March. When the RAJAR listening figures were released in May 2010, it was revealed that 6 Music had an average of 1.02 million listeners in the first three months of the year, compared to 695,000 the previous year.

In 2011, 6 Music had a total audience of 1.3 million listeners in the three months to 27 March, up from 1.14m in the previous quarter, according to the latest data from the Radio Joint Audience Research (RAJAR) board. Buoyed by shows from high-profile DJs such as Jarvis Cocker, Huey Morgan and Lauren Laverne, 6 Music has also grown its audience from 1.02m in the first quarter of 2010. The station broke more records in 2012, with a total audience of 1.62 million in the third quarter of the year. For the last month of 2012 RAJAR reported 6 Music listening figures had overtaken BBC Radio 4 Extra to become the most-listened-to digital-only radio station in the United Kingdom. The same report also showed that 6 Music had surpassed BBC Radio 3 in listening share, an increase of 31% from the year previously.

In 2014, a report was released stating that BBC Radio 6 Music had overtaken BBC Radio 3 in numbers of listeners per week for the first time. The digital station's weekly average was 1.89m listeners (up 5.5% on 2013) while BBC Radio 3's average weekly listenership was 1.884m.

In 2018, BBC Radio 6 Music was the 10th most popular radio station as measured by weekly reach – between Talksport and Absolute Radio – and the 6th most popular as measured by listener hours – between BBC Radio 5 Live and Kiss.

Listener figures peaked at 2.8million in 2022, with figures in 2023 down slightly to 2.7 million, remaining at 2.7million in 2024.

== Press coverage ==
=== Nominations and awards ===
Several of BBC 6 Music's presenters and shows have won Sony Radio Academy Awards. In 2006 presenter Marc Riley won a Silver award for The Music Radio Personality of the Year. In April 2008, comedy duo Adam and Joe's 6 Music Saturday morning show won the Broadcasting Press Guild award for Radio Programme of the Year. George Lamb also won the Sony 'Rising Star' award. In May 2009, Adam and Joe won three Sony Radio Silver awards.

Following the announcement that 6 Music was to be closed, Adam and Joe won the best comedy prize at the Sony Radio Academy Awards in May 2010, with Jarvis Cocker winning the rising star award, voted for by listeners, for their 6 Music shows. Two years later, the station was named UK Station of the Year at the Sonys, with the judges citing its "confidence across its schedule that not only reflects a real passion for music but also a firm understanding of the audience they are broadcasting to."

=== Controversies ===
In 2007, BBC 6 Music was in the press because of scandals over rigged competitions. It emerged that in 2006, the Liz Kershaw Show faked a competition by using producers and their friends as "competition winners", leading to the firing of a junior producer. On 20 September 2007, it was announced that the Head of Programmes, Ric Blaxill, had resigned.

In May 2008, George Lamb was reprimanded for using his programme to back Conservative candidate Boris Johnson for London mayor.

== Events ==
=== 6 Music Festival ===
In January 2014 the BBC launched 6 Music Festival, a new music festival featuring artists that "share the alternative spirit of the network". The festival takes place in a different city each year, with the first edition held in Manchester in February 2014 and headlined by Damon Albarn. Tickets sold out in six minutes for the event, but Albarn's headline set was criticised and it was claimed that the festival "just didn't work".

6 Music Festival returned in 2015 in Newcastle upon Tyne and Gateshead, with performances including Maxïmo Park, Neneh Cherry, Royal Blood, The Charlatans, Mogwai, Sleater-Kinney and Hot Chip. The festival was praised as a "triumphant celebration of the left-field", and compared favourably to the 2014 event. The 2016 event was held across three venues in Bristol with performances from Foals and Bloc Party. The daily capacity was 5,000.

The 2017 edition took place in March of that year (unlike previous festivals, which took place in February) in Glasgow, and included major sets from Future Islands, Sparks, Depeche Mode, The Shins and Belle and Sebastian. It again included evening gigs, daytime gigs, talks and screenings. No festival took place in 2018. However, the station did curate the Belfast event of the Biggest Weekend.

The 2019 edition of the festival took place in Liverpool. It ran for three days across four venues and included sets from The Good, the Bad & the Queen, Anna Calvi, John Grant, Idles, Fontaines D.C. and She drew the gun.

The 2020 edition was held at the Roundhouse in Chalk Farm, London.

The 2022 edition took place in Cardiff. Róisín Murphy headlined the Saturday night event.

The 2023 BBC Radio 6 Music Festival was held in Manchester - now its permanent home - at the O2 Victoria Warehouse (headline acts), Band on the Wall (BBC Music Introducing showcases) and RAMONA (DJ mix show). Acts taking part included Tim Burgess, Christine and the Queens, Hot Chip, Lava La Rue, Phoebe Green, Antony Szmierek, Afflecks Palace, Arlo Parks and the Big Moon.

The 2024 edition took place at Victoria Warehouse, Band on the Wall and new venue YES. Headliners were Young Fathers, Gossip and The Smile. The headliners in 2025 were Ezra Collective, Mogwai and Kae Tempest.

== Presenters ==
- Afrodeutsche
- Craig Charles
- Jarvis Cocker
- Gideon Coe
- Beth Ditto
- Matt Everitt
- Guy Garvey
- Deb Grant
- Nick Grimshaw
- Chris Hawkins
- Mary Anne Hobbs
- Femi Koleoso
- Steve Lamacq
- Lauren Laverne
- Don Letts
- Stuart Maconie
- Cerys Matthews
- Gilles Peterson
- Emily Pilbeam
- Iggy Pop
- Mark Radcliffe
- Marc Riley
- Nathan Shepherd
- Sherelle
- Huw Stephens
- Jamz Supernova

=== Stand-in presenters ===
- Sudan Archives
- Ólafur Arnalds
- Gemma Cairney
- DJ Paulette
- Bobby Friction
- Ezra Furman
- Jayda G
- Vic Galloway
- Nubya Garcia
- Nabihah Iqbal
- Michael Kiwanuka
- Amy Lamé
- Annie Mac
- Cillian Murphy
- Róisín Murphy
- Nemone
- Bill Nighy
- Katie Puckrik
- Tom Robinson
- Tarsza Williams

== Station management ==
=== Current ===
- Samantha Moy – Head of 6 Music, 2020–present
- James Stirling – Head of Programmes, 6 Music, 2012–
- Jeff Smith – Head of Music, Radio 2 and 6 Music / head of the weekly playlist meeting
- Lorna Clarke – Controller of Pop (Radio 1, 1Xtra, Radio 2, 6 Music, Asian Network) 2019–present, Head of Production, Radio 2 and 6 Music, 2017-2019 and Network Manager, Radio 2 and 6 Music, 2010–2017

=== Former ===
- Paul Rodgers – Head of 6 Music, 2016–2020 previously Editor, 2008–2012, and Head of Programmes, 2013–2016
- Bob Shennan – Network Controller, Radio 2 and 6 Music, 2009–2016
- Lesley Douglas – Network Controller, Radio 2 and 6 Music, 2004–2008
- Ric Blaxill – Head of Programmes, 2004–2007
