= List of compositions by Lord Berners =

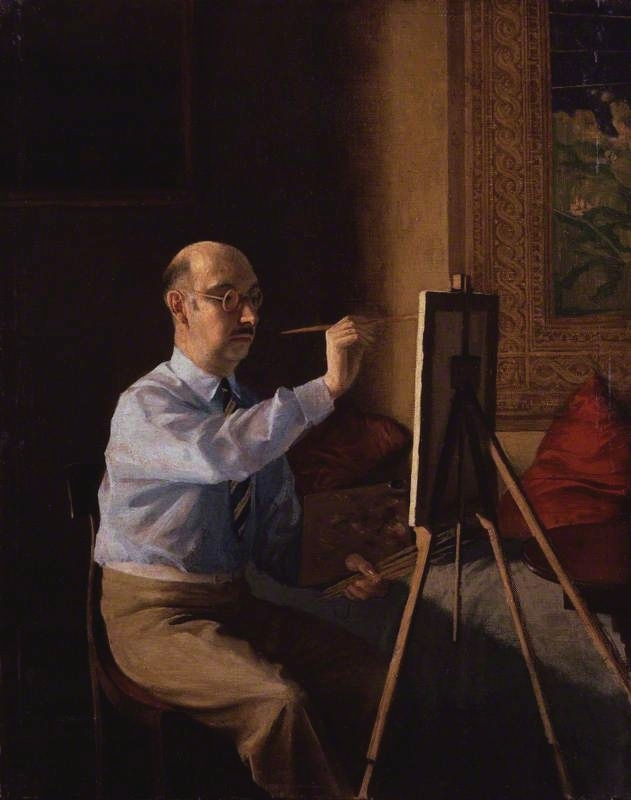
Portrait of Lord Berners by Rex Whistler, 1929

This is a list of compositions by Lord Berners:

== Opera ==
- Le Carrosse du Saint-Sacrament (after Prosper Mérimée; 1923, prod. Paris, 1924, Théâtre des Champs-Élysées, revised 1926)

== Ballet ==
- The Triumph of Neptune (10 tableaux; composed for Sergei Diaghilev, scenario Sacheverell Sitwell, choreography George Balanchine; 3 December 1926, Lyceum Theatre, London)
  - Adagio, Variations and Hornpipe arr. for strings from 5th and 6th tableaux
  - Suite for orchestra
- Luna Park (1930; scenario Boris Kochno, choreography George Balanchine, C. B. Cochran's Revue, Palace Theatre, London)
- A Wedding Bouquet (1937; scenario Gertrude Stein, choreography Frederick Ashton; costumes and scenery by Berners himself; 27 April 1937, London, Sadler's Wells Theatre)
- Cupid and Psyche (1938; stage setting Sir Francis Rose, choreography Frederick Ashton, 27 April 1939, Sadler's Wells)
- Les Sirènes (1946; designs by Cecil Beaton; Royal Opera House; the orchestration was entirely the work of Roy Douglas, who was sworn to secrecy)

== Film scores ==
- The Halfway House (1944)
- Champagne Charlie (1945, 2 songs)
- Nicholas Nickleby (1947)

== Orchestral ==
- Trois Morceaux (1916)
  - Chinoiserie
  - Valse sentimentale
  - Kasatchok
- Fantaisie espagnole (1918–19)
  - Prelude
  - Fandango
  - Pasadoble
- Fugue in C minor (1924)
- Adagio, Variations and Hornpipe (arranged for strings from The Triumph of Neptune, 1926)
- Suite (from The Triumph of Neptune)

== Piano ==
- Le Poisson d'or (1914; dedicated to Igor Stravinsky)
- Trois Petites marches funèbres (1914; first performed by Alfredo Casella)
  - Pour un homme d'état
  - Pour un canari
  - Pour une tante à héritage
- Fragments psychologiques (1915)
  - La Haine
  - Le Rire
  - Un Soupir
- Valses bourgeoises (1917, piano duet; performed at the 1923 Salzburg Festival)
  - Valse brillante
  - Valse caprice
  - Strauss, Strauss et Straus [sic]

== Songs ==
- Lieder Album (Heinrich Heine, 1913)
  - "Du bist wie eine Blume" (addressed to a small white pig)
  - "König Wiswamitra"
  - "Weihnachtslied"
- "Trois Chansons" (Georges Jean-Aubry, 1920)
  - "Romance"
  - "L'Étoile filante"
  - "La Fiancée du timbalier"
- Three Songs (1920)
  - "Lullaby" (Thomas Dekker)
  - "The Lady Visitor in the Pauper Ward" (Robert Graves)
  - "The Green-Eyed Monster" (E. L. Duff)
- "Dialogue Between Tom Filuter and his Man, by Ned the Dog-Stealer" (1921)
- Three Songs (1922)
  - "The Rio Grande" (Captain Chanty)
  - "Theodore, or the Pirate King" (John Masefield)
  - "A Long Time Ago" (Halliards Chanty)
