= Robert Parker (sound engineer) =

Australian sound engineer and broadcaster

Robert Noel Parker (24 December 1936 – 30 December 2004) was an Australian sound engineer, jazz expert and broadcaster known for his radio series Jazz Classics in Digital Stereo.

Born in Sydney, he worked for the Commonwealth Film Unit then moved to Britain in 1964 to work in the film and television industry. On returning to Australia, he received a commission from the Australian Broadcasting Corporation for a radio series on jazz.

A collector of records from the age of 12, Parker had assembled a large collection of vintage music. He developed methods for transferring recordings to digital media, reducing or eliminating surface noise and creating a stereo version. He used digital equipment to transfer and enhance recordings and used a comb filter system to create two sound channels and a perception of differing instrument placements. Zan Stewart in the Los Angeles Times described the soundstage as "a very successful mono re-creation closely resembling actual stereo sound." Parker's 78 rpm transfers were utilised in a radio programme Jazz Classics in Digital Stereo, first broadcast in May 1982 by ABC Radio and later broadcast internationally, including on BBC Radio 2 in the UK. His transfer of "Milenberg Joys", performed by McKinney's Cotton Pickers, was adopted as the theme tune for his broadcasts.

With the techniques he used, according to a 1988 article in The New York Times by John S. Wilson, Parker's technical skills created "reproductions of jazz records of the 1920s and earlier that are not only free of surface noise but reveal details, subtleties and a sense of presence that were not previously evident on the records, even in LP re-issues." Covering the subject in several articles, The Washington Post was also enthusiastic. Dan Morgenstern in The New York Times wrote: "it should be pointed out that the results in no way resemble the awful 'fake stereo' of the 50's. To these ears, Mr. Parker has done particularly well with material from the acoustic period, such as King Oliver's Creole Jazz Band, and is least successful with the human voice."

However, according to The New Grove Dictionary of Jazz/Grove Music Online, "at the time of their first appearance ... a critical storm arose about their faithfulness to the original performances in comparison with the best monaural analogue transfers of the 1960s; Parker’s addition of echo effects and attempts to simulate stereophonic sound were particularly censured."

Parker returned to Britain in 1990 and established his own studio in Devon. A series of vintage record transfers under the banners Jazz Classics in Digital Stereo and The Classic Years in Digital Stereo were issued.

== Select discography ==
- The Best of Robert Parker: Jazz Classics in Digital Stereo (RPCD641)
