= Clare Teal =

English singer and broadcaster

- Born: 14 May 1973 (age 53); Kildwick, Yorkshire, England
- Genres: Jazz, big band, swing
- Occupations: Singer, broadcaster
- Instrument: Vocals
- Labels: Candid, Mud
- Website: www.clareteal.co.uk

Clare Teal (born 14 May 1973) is an English singer and broadcaster who has become famous not only for her singing, but also for having signed the biggest recording contract by a British jazz singer.

== Biography ==
Teal was brought up in the Kildwick area of Yorkshire. She developed an interest in jazz from an early age, through her father's collection of 78rpm records, becoming "obsessed" with big band singers such as Ella Fitzgerald and big bands such as Joe Loss. She took music lessons, first on the electronic organ, then more formally on clarinet, before studying music at the University of Wolverhampton. While at university, Teal found herself without a clarinet for an unexpected examination. Deciding to sing instead, she not only got her "best grades ever", but discovered that she loved singing in public. After graduation, she started a career in advertising, singing in her spare time with amateur and semi-professional bands.

== Career ==
Teal's break came when she was asked to stand in for Stacey Kent at a weekend festival in Llandrindod Wells. This led (after some determined self-promotion, in which she drew upon her advertising skills) to a three-album contract with the jazz label Candid Records. Her popularity soared, with appearances on radio and television bringing her to the attention of a wider public, and in 2004 she released her first album for Sony Jazz in what was the biggest recording deal by any British jazz singer. Don't Talk topped the jazz charts and entered the UK Top 20 UK Albums Chart.

While the majority of her recordings are cover versions of standards, her albums feature original songs and contemporary cover versions, notably a cover of "California Dreaming" by The Mamas & the Papas. This song attracted the attention of BBC Radio presenter Michael Parkinson, garnering significant publicity during her period with Candid Records.

Teal has toured throughout the UK and the world, with her pianist, trio, mini big band, or Hollywood Orchestra. She has worked with the Hallé Orchestra, BBC Concert Orchestra, RTÉ Concert Orchestra and the John Wilson Orchestra, as well as other top big bands. In August 2017, she produced and presented her third concert for The Proms. "Swing No End" featured two big bands and many special guests. It was broadcast on BBC Radio 2 and BBC Radio 3, and televised on BBC Four.

From 2006 to 2013, Teal presented the BBC Radio 2 show Big Band Special. In 2009, she started presenting her own show on BBC Radio 2. She has appeared as a presenter on Friday Night is Music Night. From 2 August 2009, she presented Sunday Night at 10, taking over from Malcolm Laycock. She writes a weekly blog for The Yorkshire Post.

Her final show for BBC Radio 2 was broadcast on 3 January 2021. On 24 January 2021, she joined Jazz FM for a two-hour swing and big band show. Her final show for Jazz FM was broadcast on 21 July 2024.

Teal collaborated with Van Morrison on the single "Carrying a Torch" from his album Duets: Reworking the Catalogue. She was the opening act for Liza Minnelli at Kenwood House and the Royal Festival Hall. She performed at the Glastonbury Festival and the Marlborough Jazz Festival.

On 2 August 2024, Teal appeared as a special guest as part of BBC Proms at the Royal Albert Hall. The evening celebrated Sam Smith's debut album, In the Lonely Hour. She sang two songs with them accompanied by the BBC Concert Orchestra. The songs were "Messing with Fire" and "Fever". She also joined them on stage for the finale song, "Over the Rainbow".

In March 2026, Teal started a two-hour show on the Boom Light radio station, playing swing and big band favourites.

== Personal life ==
Teal lives in a village near Bath with her partner Amanda Field. In 2007, she said that, although she had lived in Bath for more than a decade, she still feels like a Northerner, saying she is "never not from Yorkshire".

== Awards and honours ==
- British Jazz Vocalist of the Year, 2005, 2007, 2015 and 2017
- BBC Jazz Vocalist of the Year, 2006
- Arts & Entertainment Personality of the Year, 2004 and 2011
- Gold Badge, British Academy of Songwriters, Composers and Authors, 2011

== Discography ==
- Nice Work (1995)
- That's the Way It Is (Candid, 2001)
- Orsino's Songs (Candid, 2002)
- The Road Less Travelled (Candid, 2003)
- Don't Talk (Sony, 2004)
- Paradisi Carousel (Sony, 2007)
- Get Happy (Universal, 2008)
- Live at Ebenezer Chapel (Ebenezer, 2009)
- Hey Ho (Mud, 2011)
- And So It Goes with Grant Windsor (Mud, 2013)
- In Good Company with Grant Windsor, Pee Wee Ellis (Mud, 2014)
- At Your Request (Mud, 2015)
- A Tribute to Ella Fitzgerald (Chasing the Dragon, 2016)
- Twelve O'Clock Tales (Mud, 2016)
- They Say It's Swing (Mud, 2020)
