= Kenneth Alwyn =

British conductor and composer (1925–2020)

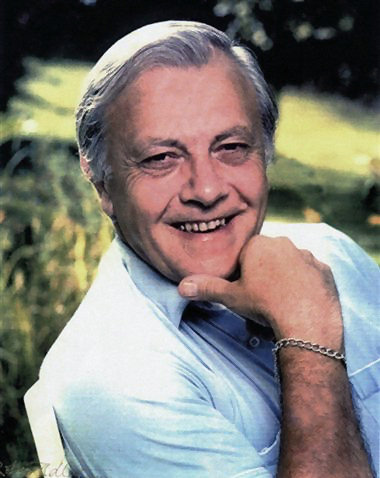
- Alwyn in 1985
- Born: Kenneth Alwyn Wetherell; 28 July 1925; Croydon, England
- Died: 10 December 2020 (aged 95); West Chiltington, England
- Education: Royal Academy of Music
- Occupation: Conductor • composer • writer
- Notable work: Friday Night Is Music Night 1812 Overture
- Spouse: Mary Law (m. 1960)
- Children: 2

Kenneth Alwyn Wetherell (28 July 1925 – 10 December 2020) was a British conductor, composer, and writer. Described by BBC Radio 3 as "one of the great British musical directors", Alwyn was known for his many recordings, including with the London Symphony Orchestra on Decca's first stereophonic recording of Tchaikovsky's 1812 Overture. He was also known for his long association with BBC Radio 2's orchestral live music programme Friday Night is Music Night, appearing for thirty years as a conductor and presenter, and for his contribution to British musical theatre as a prolific musical director in the 1950s and 1960s. He was a Fellow of the Royal Academy of Music and married the actress Mary Law in 1960. His website and the first volume of his memoirs A Baton in the Ballet and Other Places were both published in 2015. The second volume Is Anyone Watching? was published in 2017.

== Early life, wartime service and education ==
Alwyn was born Kenneth Alwyn Wetherell in Croydon, England, and attended the John Ruskin Boys' Central School (now known as John Ruskin College). After wartime service with the Royal Air Force, Alwyn joined the Royal Academy of Music (1947–1951), where he studied singing, viola and organ (with C. H. Trevor) and won the Manns Memorial Prize for conducting in 1952. He was the Sub-Professor of Organ and opera coach and founded the RAM Madrigal Choir. He did not use his surname during his career, and was instead credited as Kenneth Alwyn; this originated during his time at RAM, when he credited himself as such due to a rule which banned current students from performing professionally.

After a period as a Colonial Officer working with Radio Malaya in Singapore and a post as conductor with the Royal Wellington Choral Union in Wellington, New Zealand, in 1952, Alwyn returned to England.

== Career ==
=== The Royal Ballet, Covent Garden ===
In 1952 Alwyn joined the Sadler's Wells Theatre Ballet (now known as the Birmingham Royal Ballet) as a conductor. In 1957, he moved to the Royal Ballet at the Royal Opera House, Covent Garden, where he shared the rostrum with Malcolm Sargent, Ernest Ansermet, Arthur Bliss, William Walton, Hans Werner Henze and Benjamin Britten, from whom he took over Britten's original production of The Prince of the Pagodas. It received its premiere on 1 January 1957. Alwyn also served as musical director of the Western Theatre Ballet (now known as the Scottish Ballet) from 1967 to 1969.

=== Conducting tours ===
Alwyn toured extensively in Europe, North America, South Africa and the Far East. As principal conductor of the Yomiuri Nippon Symphony Orchestra in the 1960s, Alwyn conducted the first performance in Japan of Gustav Holst's The Planets, and introduced other British works to Japanese audiences.

=== BBC radio and television career ===
In 1958, the BBC invited Alwyn to conduct the BBC Concert Orchestra, marking the beginning of a long association between Alwyn and the BBC as a conductor and presenter of programmes including Friday Night is Music Night. Alwyn worked with all of the BBC's orchestras, serving as associate conductor of the BBC Concert Orchestra and, from 1969, as principal conductor of the BBC Northern Ireland Orchestra (now known as the Ulster Orchestra). He also served on the BBC Music Advisory Committee.

Alwyn presented the BBC TV series The Orchestra, conducting the Royal Philharmonic Orchestra. The series culminated in a performance of Benjamin Britten's Let's Make an Opera and was part of a pioneering educational movement, led by John Hosier, to teach music in schools through the medium of television. Alwyn also presented a BBC Omnibus documentary on the music of Tchaikovsky, directed by Sir John Drummond.

Alwyn's friendship with the comedian Dudley Moore led to a collaboration for Moore's final UK concert tour in March 1992. Alwyn conducted the BBC Concert Orchestra for a series of performances with Moore at the piano. These included a series of concerts at the Royal Albert Hall, London, broadcast live on BBC Radio 4 and later released on CD under the title Live from an Aircraft Hangar (Martine Avenue Productions, Inc. 2001). Music from Moore's 1992 tour with Alwyn also featured in a BBC Radio 2 programme celebrating 60 years of the BBC Concert Orchestra, broadcast on 2 March 2012. Alwyn's friendship and stage performances with another popular British comic, Bob Monkhouse, are chronicled in Monkhouse's autobiography Crying with Laughter: My Life Story.

=== Musical theatre ===
To mark the year of his 80th birthday, Alwyn was interviewed by Edward Seckerson for BBC Radio 3's programme Stage and Screen, broadcast on 21 November 2005. The programme notes record that "Alwyn's career has encompassed many of the highlights of post-war British musical theatre". Working frequently with Gordon Langford as orchestrator, Alwyn served as musical director for the premieres of many Broadway and original British musicals, including the following productions:

- The Crooked Mile (Cambridge Theatre, London, 1959) starring Millicent Martin and Elisabeth Welch
- The Most Happy Fella (London Coliseum, 1959) starring Inia Te Wiata, Helena Scott and Art Lund
- H.M.S. Pinafore (Her Majesty's Theatre, 1962) directed by Sir Tyrone Guthrie
- The Pirates of Penzance (Her Majesty's Theatre, 1962) directed by Sir Tyrone Guthrie
- Half a Sixpence (Cambridge Theatre, London, 1963) starring Tommy Steele, Marti Webb and James Grout
- Camelot (Theatre Royal, Drury Lane, London, 1964) starring Laurence Harvey and Elizabeth Larner
- Charlie Girl (Adelphi Theatre, London, 1965) starring Derek Nimmo, Gerry Marsden and Anna Neagle
- Jorrocks (New London Theatre, 1966) starring Joss Ackland and Cheryl Kennedy

Alwyn made original cast recordings of all of the above shows and also made studio cast recordings (complete and/or highlights) of the following musicals:

- Oliver! (1960) featuring Ian Carmichael
- Bitter Sweet (1961) featuring Susan Hampshire and Adele Leigh
- Kismet (1961) featuring Elizabeth Harwood
- Guys and Dolls (1962) featuring Adele Leigh
- West Side Story (1962) featuring Adele Leigh
- Carmen Jones (1962) featuring Grace Bumbry and Elisabeth Welch
- Porgy and Bess (1964) featuring Lawrence Winters and Isabelle Lucas
- Glamorous Night / Careless Rapture (1969, reissued 2005) featuring John Stoddart and Patricia Johnson
- Gilbert & Sullivan Overtures (1963, reissued 2005) with the Royal Philharmonic Orchestra
- Gilbert & Sullivan: Valerie Masterson and Robert Tear sing Gilbert & Sullivan (1983) with the Bournemouth Sinfonietta
- The Most Happy Fella (2007) featuring Brian Blessed
- Carousel (2007) featuring Mandy Patinkin

Alwyn served as musical director for a production of the pantomime Dick Whittington at the Bristol Old Vic Theatre in 1955 starring Peter O'Toole. In recognition of his contribution to the world of British musical theatre, Alwyn and the Alwyn Concert Orchestra were invited to perform at the memorial service for Noël Coward, which was held in Westminster Abbey on 28 March 1984 in the presence of Queen Elizabeth The Queen Mother.

=== Orchestral recordings ===
Alwyn's orchestral recording career dates back to 1958, when he recorded Tchaikovsky's 1812 Overture for Decca Records with the London Symphony Orchestra and the Band of the Grenadier Guards, which has been reviewed and critically acclaimed many times over the years in Gramophone magazine. and was chosen as one of its records of the year (1958 Gramophone Critics' Choice). The recording famously featured slowed-down gunshots to mimic cannon fire. It has remained a mainstay of the classical catalogue and was re-issued by Decca in 2012. Other notable recordings include Lord Berners' Wedding Bouquet with the RTÉ Chamber Choir and Sinfonietta (1996 Gramophone Critics' Choice).

Selected discography:

- Richard Addinsell: Warsaw Concerto / Hubert Bath: Cornish Rhapsody / Miklós Rózsa: Spellbound Concerto / Charles Williams: The Dream of Olwen / George Gershwin: Rhapsody in Blue with Daniel Adni and the Bournemouth Symphony Orchestra (EMI 1980, 1988, re-issued 2006)
- Paul Ben-Haim: Symphony No. 1 with the Royal Philharmonic Orchestra (CBS)
- Ben-Haim: Symphony No. 2, Op. 36 / Concerto for Strings, Op. 40 with the Royal Philharmonic Orchestra (Nimbus Records for Jerusalem Records/Stradivari Classics, recorded 1962 and 1967, released 1984)
- Lord Berners: Wedding Bouquet / Luna Park / March with the RTÉ Chamber Choir and Sinfonietta (Marco Polo 1996)
- Jeremiah Clarke: Trumpet Voluntary with the Trumpeters of Kneller Hall, the Royal Military School and London Symphony Orchestra, recorded at the opening concert of the Aldeburgh Festival in 1953, at which Benjamin Britten and Imogen Holst also conducted works appearing on the same recording (Decca 1962, re-issued by Decca Eloquence)
- Samuel Coleridge-Taylor: Hiawatha's Wedding Feast with Anthony Rolfe Johnson, the Bournemouth Symphony Chorus and the Bournemouth Symphony Orchestra (EMI 1984 and 2005)
- Coleridge-Taylor: The Song of Hiawatha / Symphonic Variations on an African Air with Bryn Terfel, Helen Field and the Welsh National Opera (Decca 1991, 1998 and 2002)
- George Gershwin: Rhapsody in Blue / An American in Paris / Piano Concerto in F with Malcolm Binns and the Sinfonia of London Orchestra (EMI 1966)
- Edvard Grieg: Peer Gynt - Suite No. 1 / Rossini: Overtures with the London Philharmonic Orchestra and New Symphony Orchestra of London (re-issued by DECCA Eloquence 2012)
- Pyotr Ilyich Tchaikovsky: 1812 Overture / Capriccio italien / Marche Slave / Swan Lake with the London Symphony Orchestra and London Philharmonic Orchestra (Decca 1958, Decca Ace of Diamonds 1965, Decca 2008, Decca Eloquence 2012)

=== Film music recordings ===
Alwyn's recording of The Ladykillers: Music from Those Glorious Ealing Films with the Royal Ballet Sinfonia won the 1998 Gramophone Award for Best Film Music Recording, and a selection of Richard Addinsell's film music entitled British Light Music with the BBC Concert Orchestra was chosen as a record of the year by Gramophone magazine (1995 Gramophone Critics' Choice). A collection of main themes and excerpts from famous film scores, including The Last of the Mohicans, The English Patient and Sense and Sensibility was also selected as a recording of the year by the magazine in 1998. Alwyn's wide interest in film music of all genres has led him to re-record many popular film scores, including The Bride of Frankenstein for which he received particular acclaim: "Shaped by Kenneth Alwyn with an admirable feel for the music's full-blooded style, and graced with a tight, bright recording which gives the orchestra an authentic film studio sound, this could almost be the original film soundtrack in modern digital dressing."

Selected discography:

- Addinsell: British Light Music: Goodbye Mr Chips / A Tale of Two Cities / Fire Over England / Tom Brown's Schooldays / The Prince and the Showgirl / Festival with the BBC Concert Orchestra (Marco Polo 1995)
- Addinsell: Music of Richard Addinsell including Warsaw Concerto with the Royal Ballet Sinfonia (ASV 1997 and Decca 2010)
- Addinsell: Film Music with Peter Lawson and the Royal Ballet Sinfonia (ASV 1997)
- Auric and others: The Ladykillers: Music from Those Glorious Ealing Films with the Royal Ballet Sinfonia (Silva 1997)
- Bax and Arnold: Music for Films: Oliver Twist / Malta GC / The Sound Barrier: Rhapsody for Orchestra, Op.38 with the Royal Philharmonic Orchestra (CNR 1989, re-released ASV 1993)
- Newman: Man of Galilee: The Essential Alfred Newman Film Music Collection (Silva America 2001)
- Rozsa: Ben-Hur: The Essential Miklos Rozsa with the City of Prague Philharmonic Orchestra (Silva Screen 1996, Silva America 2000)
- Morricone: Once Upon a Time: The Essential Ennio Morricone Film Music Collection (Silva America 2004)
- Schurmann and others: Horror! with the Westminster Philharmonic Orchestra (Silva Screen, 1996)
- Steiner: The Flame and the Arrow: Classic Film Music with the City of Prague Philharmonic Orchestra (Silva Screen 1998)
- Steiner: Gone with the Wind: The Classic Max Steiner (Silva America 1994 and 2001)
- Steiner and others: Cinema Century (Silva Screen 1999)
- Vaughan Williams: Coastal Command / Bliss: Conquest of the Air / Schurmann: Attack & Celebration / Easdale: The Red Shoes with the Philharmonia Orchestra (Silva America 1993)
- Waxman: The Bride of Frankenstein / The Invisible Ray with the Westminster Philharmonic Orchestra (Silva America 1993)
- Young: The Quiet Man with the Dublin Screen Orchestra (Silva Screen Records 1995)
- Various: Best of British Light Music with the BBC Concert Orchestra and others (Naxos 2007)
- Various: Cinema's Classic Romances with the City of Prague Philharmonic Orchestra (Silva Classics 1998)

=== Compositions ===
Alwyn composed music and text for the BBC's Battle of Britain tour of North America to commemorate the 50th anniversary of the battle in 1990. His compositions for the tour include Fighter Command 1940, which is included on the album A Tribute to the Few (Polyphonic 1990) with the Massed Bands of the Royal Air Force. Said to reflect his own flying experience, it has been described as "a musical panorama of those days in march time". It has become a standard Royal Air Force ceremonial march and is played at the opening Royal Air Force Tours which commemorate anniversaries of the Battle of Britain. Alwyn maintained an interest in flying throughout his life, and was a flight instructor at Brighton City Airport.

Alwyn devised and conducted a gala concert in aid of Imperial Cancer Research Fund (now a constituent charity of Cancer Research UK) for the 1993 St George's Day Festival, for which he wrote much of the original music, featuring the BBC Concert Orchestra, the Royal Artillery Band, St George's Singers, St George's Festival Choir and the Wells Cathedral Junior School Choir. Starring Peter Vaughan as St George, it was broadcast from the Royal Albert Hall on BBC Radio 2.

Alwyn devised and conducted a BBC concert to commemorate the 50th anniversary of D-Day on 6 June 1994, for which he wrote a musical description of D-Day called Echoes, introduced by Raymond Baxter. The BBC Concert Orchestra concert was broadcast live from Portsmouth and was subsequently released on CD as D-Day: The Fiftieth Anniversary Musical Tribute (Start 2010).

Alwyn's other compositions include Concert March: The Young Grenadier which he dedicated to HM The Queen. It was played by the Massed Bands of the Brigade of Guards at the Trooping of the Colour in 1991 and is included on the album The Music of the Grenadier Guards (SRC 2006). The title of the work refers to a famous photograph of a young Princess Elizabeth wearing a grenadier cap at the time when she became colonel of the regiment in 1942. Alwyn also composed a setting of Queen Elizabeth I's poem Youth and Cupid for a royal gala performance at the Chichester Festival Theatre to commemorate HM The Queen's Silver Jubilee in June 1977.

He wrote the music and lyrics of a number of comic songs for singer Ian Wallace's album Wallace's New Zoo, released in 1965, including The Gorilla, (re-released as part of The Best of Ian Wallace, EMI 1994) and he has written stories and poems for children. Alwyn also composed the song Liverpool for Gerry Marsden (later of Gerry and the Pacemakers), released in 1968.

Alwyn composed the theme tune for the LWT series Affairs of the Heart (1974–1975), a set of adaptations of the stories of Henry James, and he was also commissioned to write the music for the television adaptation of Sir John Mortimer's play A Choice of Kings, which commemorated the 900th anniversary of the Battle of Hastings.

=== Promotion of the works of Samuel Coleridge-Taylor ===
Alwyn said that his interest in Coleridge-Taylor's work began when his first dance band, 66 Squadron (Croydon) Air Training Corps, played Demande et Réponse in 1942. He later discovered that he had been christened at the same church where Coleridge-Taylor had been married and that they had attended the same school and had lived on the same street. Alwyn included Demande et Réponse in the first BBC concert to be broadcast from Fairfield Halls, Croydon, in 1962, and other works by Coleridge-Taylor often featured in his programmes as presenter and conductor of Friday Night Is Music Night. In 1975, the centenary year of Coleridge-Taylor's birth, Alwyn broadcast from Fairfield Halls the first complete performance of Coleridge-Taylor's The Song of Hiawatha, Op.30 since Sir Malcolm Sargent had conducted the work at the Royal Albert Hall in the 1930s. In 1991, Alwyn recorded the entire Song trilogy with Bryn Terfel and the Welsh National Opera.

In recognition of his long-standing work to bring the work of Coleridge-Taylor to greater prominence, Alwyn was invited in January 2013 to unveil a blue plaque at the composer's home in Croydon as the culmination of a year of events to commemorate the centenary of Coleridge-Taylor's death.

== Personal life and death ==
Alwyn married actress Mary Elisabeth Law in 1960. They had two daughters. He died at his home in West Chiltington on 10 December 2020, at the age of 95. His widow, Mary, died on 15 April 2024, at the age of 91.
