= Lesley Douglas =

British former radio executive

- Born: 7 June 1963 (age 63); Longbenton, Newcastle upon Tyne, England
- Education: University of Manchester
- Occupation: Radio executive
- Known for: Time as Controller of BBC Radio 2 and 6 Music

Lesley Douglas (born 7 June 1963) is a British former radio executive. She was the Controller of BBC Radio 2 and 6 Music from early 2004 until her resignation in October 2008 over The Russell Brand Show prank calls.

== Early life ==
Lesley Douglas was born in 1963 in Longbenton, North Tyneside, where she grew up. Having an ambition to be a journalist, she chose to study English at the University of Manchester in order to be closer to the vibrant 1980s Manchester scene.

== BBC career ==
On graduation, Douglas joined the BBC as a production assistant in 1986, and began at the David Jacobs Show, later joining the promotions department. In 1988, she worked as a producer on programmes such as the Gloria Hunniford Show and Brian Matthew's Round Midnight. In 1990, she returned to the Promotions department, then in 1993, she was promoted to be Editor of Radio 2 Presentation and Planning. She became Managing Editor of Radio 2, then became Head of Programmes in 2000.

Douglas was appointed Controller of both stations on 10 October 2003 and began on 5 January 2004, succeeding James Moir. She oversaw Mark Radcliffe and Marc Riley leaving Radio 1 in April 2004 and joining her two networks later that year; the controversial appointment of Chris Evans as Drivetime presenter on 18 April 2006; and appointing equally controversial Russell Brand to 6 Music in April 2006 and overseeing his move to Radio 2 in November 2006.

She was a trustee of BBC Children in Need and sat on the Radio Times Advisory Panel.

=== Controversy ===
On 29 October 2008, Russell Brand and Jonathan Ross were suspended by the BBC, after they made a series of obscene phone calls to the actor Andrew Sachs in a pre-recorded edition of The Russell Brand Show. Brand later resigned from the BBC. On 30 October 2008, Director General Mark Thompson met with the BBC Trust to discuss reaction to the incident, and Douglas's resignation was announced. On the same day, Ross was suspended by the BBC without pay for 12 weeks.

It subsequently emerged that Douglas had allowed the offending segment to be broadcast without having listened to it.

Douglas had caused controversy earlier in 2008 with remarks, made in defence of the appointment of George Lamb to the 10 am–1 pm slot on 6Music, which were seen as pandering to outdated stereotypes. An article in The Guardian quoted her as saying:

It's partly how you talk about music. Men tend to be more interested in the intellectual side of the music, the tracks, where albums have been made, that sort of thing. For women, there tends to be more emotional reaction to music.

There were existing problems with her siding with another of her signings, Brand, against a series of producers as revealed in an interview with Paul Gambaccini by Nicky Campbell on The Breakfast Show on BBC Radio 5 Live.

NC: I hear he had five or six producers and whenever one said no to him, he went and got him or her sacked?

PG: You heard accurately. And I do believe that if anyone had investigated this matter properly and as now Ofcom and the BBC will, they will find about a dozen items that will make their hair curl on end. I'm not kidding you.

In his autobiography, Booky Wook 2, Brand indicated Douglas was "incredibly tolerant" of his behaviour at BBC Radio. This included allowing Brand to use the lavatories for the disabled at the BBC for sex with female competition winners of 6 Music.

== Post-BBC career ==
In November 2008, Douglas joined the board of trustees at The Sage Gateshead. The following month, she began a new job as the Director of Programming and Business Development at the British subsidiary of Universal Music Group.

== Awards ==
A Fellow of The Radio Academy, Douglas was awarded the top prize at the Music Industry Woman of the Year Awards in 2004, and a BASCA (British Association of Composers and Songwriters) Gold Badge in October 2006. Douglas has chaired the Radio Festival Steering Committee on two occasions, and is currently Vice Chair of the Radio Academy. Douglas was awarded an honorary fellowship from the University of Sunderland in 2007.

Preceded by James Moir	Controller, BBC Radio 2; 2004–2008	Succeeded by Bob Shennan
