= Bob Shennan =

British radio executive (born 1962)

- Born: 18 March 1962 (age 64); Wirral, Cheshire, England
- Occupation: Media executive
- Known for: • Head of BBC Sport (1998–2000); • Controller, BBC Radio 5 Live (2000–2008); • Controller, BBC Asian Network (2004–2008); • Controller, BBC Radio 2 and BBC Radio 6 Music (2009–2016); • Group Managing Director, BBC (2019–2022); • Director of Audio, BBC Studios (2022–2023)

Robert Duncan James Shennan (born 18 March 1962, Wirral, Cheshire) is a British media executive, who was most recently Director of Audio at BBC Studios. He was appointed to the role in April 2022, having previously held the positions of director, BBC Radio and Music, controller of BBC Radio 2 and BBC Radio 6 Music, and group managing director of the BBC. After 36 years, Shennan left the BBC in January 2023.

== Early life ==
He was educated at Lancaster Royal Grammar School and Corpus Christi College, Cambridge.

== Career ==
Shennan has been a senior executive in radio and television for a number of years. He started as a journalist at Hereward Radio in Peterborough from 1984 to 1987. He joined BBC Sport in 1987 as a trainee radio sport producer and was part of the team that founded BBC Radio 5 Live. After working as head of BBC Sport, where he had overall responsibility for sports coverage on BBC radio and television, he was appointed head of BBC Radio 5 Live in 2000. As the network's controller, he oversaw the launch of BBC Radio 5 Live Sports Extra in 2002, and also took over as controller of the BBC Asian Network in 2004. Shennan took over as director, BBC Radio and Music, in October 2016, and became group managing director of the BBC in March 2019.

=== BBC Radio 2 ===
Shennan took over the position of station controller in February 2009 from Lesley Douglas, who resigned in October 2008 following The Russell Brand Show prank calls.

He is also a fellow of the Radio Academy.

== Personal life ==
Shennan is a Liverpool Football Club supporter.
