= Cardinal Wiseman School =

Cardinal Wiseman School may refer to:

- Cardinal Wiseman Catholic School, Birmingham, West Midlands, England
- Cardinal Wiseman Catholic School, Coventry, West Midlands, England
- The Cardinal Wiseman Catholic School, Greenford, Greenford, London, England
