= 11th National Television Awards =

British awards ceremony in 2005

- Date: 25 October 2005
- Location: Royal Albert Hall, London
- Country: United Kingdom
- Presented by: Various
- Hosted by: Trevor McDonald
- Website: http://www.nationaltvawards.com/

Television/radio coverage
- Network: ITV
- Runtime: 120 minutes

The 11th National Television Awards ceremony was held at the Royal Albert Hall on 25 October 2005 and was hosted by Sir Trevor McDonald.

== Awards ==
This is the last time (until 2018) that the National Television Awards would be held on a Tuesday.

Category	Winner	Also nominated
Most Popular Actor	Christopher Eccleston (Doctor Who)	Bradley Walsh (Coronation Street); Martin Clunes (Doc Martin); Nigel Harman (EastEnders); Shane Richie (EastEnders)
Most Popular Actress; Presented by Gary Dourdan	Billie Piper (Doctor Who)	Caroline Quentin (Life Begins); Jessie Wallace (EastEnders); June Brown (EastEnders); Sally Lindsay (Coronation Street)
Most Popular Drama; Presented by David Cameron and David Davis	Doctor Who (BBC One)	Bad Girls (ITV); Desperate Housewives (Channel 4/ABC); The Bill (ITV)
Most Popular Serial Drama	EastEnders (BBC One)	Coronation Street (ITV); Emmerdale (ITV); Hollyoaks (Channel 4)
Most Popular Entertainment Programme; Presented by Penny Lancaster	The X Factor (ITV)	Ant & Dec's Saturday Night Takeaway (ITV); Strictly Come Dancing (BBC One); Friday Night with Jonathan Ross (BBC One)
Most Popular Reality Programme	Big Brother (Channel 4)	Hell's Kitchen (ITV); I'm a Celebrity... Get Me Out of Here! (ITV); The Apprentice (BBC Two)
Most Popular Entertainment Presenter; Presented by Peter Kay	Ant & Dec (Ant & Dec's Saturday Night Takeaway)	Davina McCall (Big Brother); Jonathan Ross (Friday Night with Jonathan Ross); Paul O'Grady (The Paul O'Grady Show)
Most Popular Daytime Programme; Presented by Tess Daley & Vernon Kay	The Paul O'Grady Show (ITV)	GMTV (ITV); Neighbours (BBC One/Network Ten); This Morning (ITV)
Most Popular Expert on TV	Sharon Osbourne (The X Factor)	Gordon Ramsay (Ramsay's Kitchen Nightmares); Jamie Oliver (Jamie's School Dinners); Jeremy Clarkson (Top Gear); Simon Cowell (The X Factor)
Most Popular Quiz Programme; Presented by Alan Sugar	Who Wants to Be a Millionaire? (ITV)	A Question of Sport (BBC One); Have I Got News for You (BBC One); Test the Nation (BBC One)
Most Popular Comedy Programme	Little Britain (BBC Three)	Max and Paddy's Road to Nowhere (Channel 4); The Simpsons (Channel 4/Fox); Will & Grace (Channel 4/NBC)
Most Popular Factual Programme; Presented by Billy Murray and Jaime Murray	Jamie's School Dinners (Channel 4)	Crimewatch UK (BBC One); Wife Swap (Channel 4); Supernanny (Channel 4); Top Gear (BBC Two)
Most Popular Newcomer; Presented by Steve Jones	Antony Cotton (Coronation Street)	Amanda Mealing (Holby City); Elyes Gabel (Casualty); Lacey Turner (EastEnders)
TV Landmark Award; Presented by Julie Goodyear	Tony Warren	
Special Recognition Award	Jamie Oliver	
