= The British Animal Honours =

2013 awards ceremony on ITV

- Genre: Award ceremony
- Directed by: Nikki Parsons
- Presented by: Paul O'Grady
- Starring: Laura Whitmore (reporter)
- Country of origin: United Kingdom

Production
- Executive producers: Lisa Chapman; Malcolm Gerrie
- Producers: Zoe Cook; Darren Sole (series)
- Production location: BBC Elstree Centre
- Running time: 120 minutes (inc. adverts)
- Production company: Whizz Kid Productions

Original release
- Network: ITV
- Release: 18 April 2013

Related
- For the Love of Dogs

The British Animal Honours is a British awards ceremony which honoured the country's most extraordinary animals and the people who dedicate their lives to them. The programme was broadcast by ITV and was presented by Paul O'Grady. Animals are nominated for honours by members of the public, with the winners being decided by a panel of animal experts.

== Award ceremonies ==
Year	Original Air Date	Presenter	Location(s)	Total viewers	Weekly channel ranking
2013	18 April 2013	Paul O'Grady	BBC Elstree Centre	3.23m	20

=== 2013 ===
The first award ceremony aired on Thursday 18 April 2013 on ITV and was presented by Paul O'Grady.

The ceremony also featured one-off performances from the National Theatre's production of War Horse, a dancing dog troupe led by Kennel Club trainer Gina Pink and a showpiece by the South Wales Police Dog Section. The award ceremony was sponsored by Animal Friends Pet Insurance, who also sponsor O'Grady's other programme For the Love of Dogs.

Honour (Presenters)	Winner
The Braveheart Honour; Presented by Rupert Grint	Haatchi the dog
The Ray of Sunshine Honour; Presented by Lesley Nicol and Thomas Howes	Yorkie the pony
The Rising Star Honour; Presented by Ashleigh and Pudsey	The Children of Luss Primary School
The Guardian Angel Honour; Presented by Arlene Phillips	Hetty the Guide Dog
The Wildlife Conservation Honour; Presented by Steve Backshall	International Otter Survival Fund
The Canine Commando Honour; Presented by Dame Kelly Holmes	Brin the Afghan stray dog
The Local Charity of the Year Honour; Presented by Kate Garraway	East Sussex Wildlife Rescue and Ambulance Service (WRAS)
The Tails of the Unexpected Honour; Presented by Catherine Tyldesley and Paula Lane	Bob the Cat
The International Rescue Honour; Presented by Hayley Mills and Stephen Tompkinson	Jill Robinson, MBE of Animals Asia
The In the Line of Duty Honour; Presented by Donal MacIntyre	Tyke the dog
The Internet Star Award; Presented by Laura Whitmore	Piggy the Fridge Scaling Cat
The Outstanding Contribution Honour; Presented by Anita Dobson and Brian May	Virginia McKenna, OBE of Born Free

==== Expert Panel ====
The panel of experts consists of: Virginia McKenna, OBE, Celia Hammond, Sean Wensley, Jill Nelson, Simon King, Laura Jenkins, Emily Beament, Emma Milne, Zara Boland, Donal MacIntyre, Jenny Seagrove, Clarissa Baldwin, Peter Gorbing, Tamsin Durston, David Grant, Dr Emily Blackwell, Stuart Winter, Andy Blackmore, Anita Dobson, Johnson Beharry, Maggie Roberts, Caterina Termine, Robbie Marsland, Tim Webb, Marc Abraham, Danny Penman, Daniel Allen, Rosamund Kidman Cox, Anthea Turner and Peter Egan.
