= Paul O'Grady's Animal Orphans =

- Genre: Animals
- Presented by: Paul O'Grady
- Country of origin: United Kingdom
- Original language: English
- No. of series: 3
- No. of episodes: 8

Production
- Running time: 60 minutes (inc. adverts)
- Production company: Shiver Productions

Original release
- Network: ITV
- Release: 14 January 2014 – 21 April 2016

Related
- Paul O'Grady: For the Love of Dogs

Paul O'Grady's Animal Orphans is a British documentary series which sees presenter Paul O'Grady travel to South Africa, Zambia and Borneo, meeting some of the animals that have been orphaned in the wild.

The first series aired from 14 to 28 January 2014, whilst the second series aired from 20 January–3 February 2015 on ITV. The third and final series of Animal Orphans aired for two episodes on 14 and 21 April 2016.

== Transmissions ==
- Official viewing figures are from BARB.

Series	Start date	End date	Episodes	Average viewers (millions)
1	14 January 2014	28 January 2014	3	3.29
2	20 January 2015	3 February 2015	3	2.75
3	14 April 2016	21 April 2016	2	—N/a
