= Jonathan Harvey (playwright) =

English screenwriter, actor, playwright, and author

- Born: Jonathan Paul Harvey; 13 June 1968 (age 58); Liverpool, Lancashire, England
- Occupations: Playwright, screenwriter, actor, author
- Writing career
- Years active: 1987–present

Jonathan Paul Harvey (born 13 June 1968) is an English screenwriter, actor, playwright and author.

== Early life ==
Harvey was born in Liverpool, Lancashire in 1968 to Maureen and Brian Harvey. He has a brother, Timothy.

== Career ==
A former secondary school English teacher, his first serious attempt as a playwright was in 1987. He entered a competition, with a first prize of £1,000, for young writers at the Liverpool Playhouse, with his play The Cherry Blossom Tree, a blend of suicide, murder and nuns.

Encouraged by this success he wrote Mohair (1988), Wildfire (1992) and Babies (1993), the latter won the 'George Devine Award' for 1993 and The Evening Standard's 'Most Promising Playwright Award' for 1994. In 1993, Harvey, premiered Beautiful Thing, a gay-themed play-turned-film for which he won the John Whiting Award in 1994.

In 1995, his play Boom Bang-a-Bang premiered at the Bush Theatre, London, and was originally directed by Kathy Burke. Harvey cites it as "my most comic play ever, but with some dark bits". Centred on a group of friends gathering to watch the Eurovision Song Contest, the play was a sell-out. Also in 1995, Rupert Street Lonely Hearts Club was premiered. Guiding Star (1998), is a portrayal of a man's struggle to come to terms with the Hillsborough disaster, while Hushabye Mountain (1999) deals with a world that has learned to live with HIV/AIDS. Television and film works include: West End Girls (Carlton); Love Junkie (BBC); Beautiful Thing (Channel Four/Island World Productions); the 1999–2001 comedy series starring Kathy Burke and James Dreyfus, Gimme Gimme Gimme (Tiger Aspect); Murder Most Horrid (BBC); and Coronation Street (ITV).

Harvey wrote the book for Closer to Heaven, a stage musical with songs and music written by Pet Shop Boys. Closer to Heaven ran for nine months at the Arts Theatre in London during 2001 and in Australia in 2005. In 2003, on hearing the singer-actress Abi Roberts perform, he offered to write a solo show for her. Taking Charlie was the outcome, staged at the 2004 Edinburgh Festival with Roberts starring, under the direction of Susan Tully. The piece was darkly comic and focused on the destructive nature of an insecure, 30 year-old addict.

Harvey's first novel All She Wants was published in 2012 by Pan Books.

Since 2013, Harvey has co-written the Radio Four sitcom series What Does the K Stand For? based on the experiences of comedian Stephen K. Amos growing up as a teenager in south London in the 1980s. The programme's third series commenced in January 2017.

In February 2027, Savage, a new play by Harvey based on the life of British entertainer Paul O'Grady (and his drag queen persona Lilly Savage), will open at the Curve, Leicester prior to a UK tour and a West End run.

== Works ==
=== Plays ===
- 2027: Savage
- 2023: Mother Goose
- 2023: A Thong for Europe (Royal Court Theatre, Liverpool)
- 2020: Our Lady of Blundellsands
- 2012: Panto!
- 2010: Canary (Playhouse Theatre, Liverpool/Hampstead Theatre, London)
- 2004: Taking Charlie
- 2001: Out in the Open
- 1999: Hushabye Mountain
- 1998: Guiding Star
- 1995: Rupert Street Lonely Hearts Club
- 1995: Boom Bang-A-Bang (Bush Theatre); Rupert Street Lonely Hearts Club (English Touring Theatre/Contact Theatre Company, Donmar Warehouse/Criterion Theatre, London).
- 1994: Babies (Royal National Theatre Studio/Royal Court Theatre), winner George Devine Award 1993 and Evening Standard's Most Promising Playwright Award 1994.
- 1993–1994: Beautiful Thing (Bush Theatre, London, and Donmar Warehouse, London/Duke of York's Theatre, London), winner of the John Whiting Award 1994.
- 1992: Wildfire (Royal Court Theatre Upstairs).
- 1988: Mohair (Royal Court Young Writers Festival, London/International Festival of Young Playwrights, Sydney).
- 1987: The Cherry Blossom Tree (Liverpool Playhouse Studio) which won him the 1987 National Girobank Young Writer of the Year Award.

=== Musicals ===
- 2024: Here You Come Again
- 2019: Musik
- 2018: Dusty - The Dusty Springfield Musical
- 2001: Closer to Heaven

=== Television and film ===
- 2016–2018: Tracey Ullman's Show (BBC)
- 2009: Octavia (ITV)
- 2008–2009: Beautiful People (BBC)
- 2004: Von Trapped
- 2004–2005: Big Brother Panto (Channel 4)
- 2004–present: Coronation Street (ITV)
- 1999: Murder Most Horrid (BBC)
- 1999–2001: Gimme Gimme Gimme (BBC)
- 1996: Beautiful Thing (Channel Four/Island World Productions)
- 1993: West End Girls (Carlton)
- 1992: Love Junkie (BBC)

=== Fiction ===
- 2012: All She Wants, Pan Books, ISBN 978-0-3305-4427-6
- 2013: The Confusion of Karen Carpenter, Pan Books, ISBN 978-0-3305-4439-9
- 2014: The Girl Who Just Appeared, Pan Books, ISBN 978-1-4472-3846-1
- 2015: The Secrets We Keep, Pan Books, ISBN 978-1-4472-3847-8
- 2016: The History of Us, Pan Books, ISBN 978-1-4472-9820-5
