= Brenda Gilhooly =

English comedian

Brenda Gilhooly (born 1964) is an English comedian. Born in Epsom, Surrey, she studied English and Drama at the University College of Swansea, University of Wales, and graduated in 1987. She is best known for the character of Gayle Tuesday, an archetypal dumb blonde and Page 3 girl. She enjoyed success with this character, appearing on various TV shows.

Gilhooly first appeared on British television in 1991 with the Channel 4 series Remote Control, and then with !Viva Cabaret! in 1993, alongside similar character-based acts such as Lily Savage and Bob Downe. She has since appeared on shows such as the Jack Dee Show and Lily Live!, as well as her own series Gayle's World in 1996. She has also appeared on Lily Savage's Blankety Blank.

Most of her recent appearances have been as characters other than Gayle Tuesday, notably on Harry Hill's TV Burp, on which she was a writer, as well as an occasional performer.

Gilhooly returned to television as Gayle Tuesday in 2010 with the Living series Gayle Tuesday: The Comeback.

In 2019, Gilhooly wrote a new sitcom for BBC Radio 4, Madam Mayor. The first episode was aired on Friday 12 July 2019. Gilhooly starred as the title role, and was supported by Jack Dee, Harry Hill, Michelle Collins and Elis James.
