= Simon Spencer (producer) =

British television and theatre producer

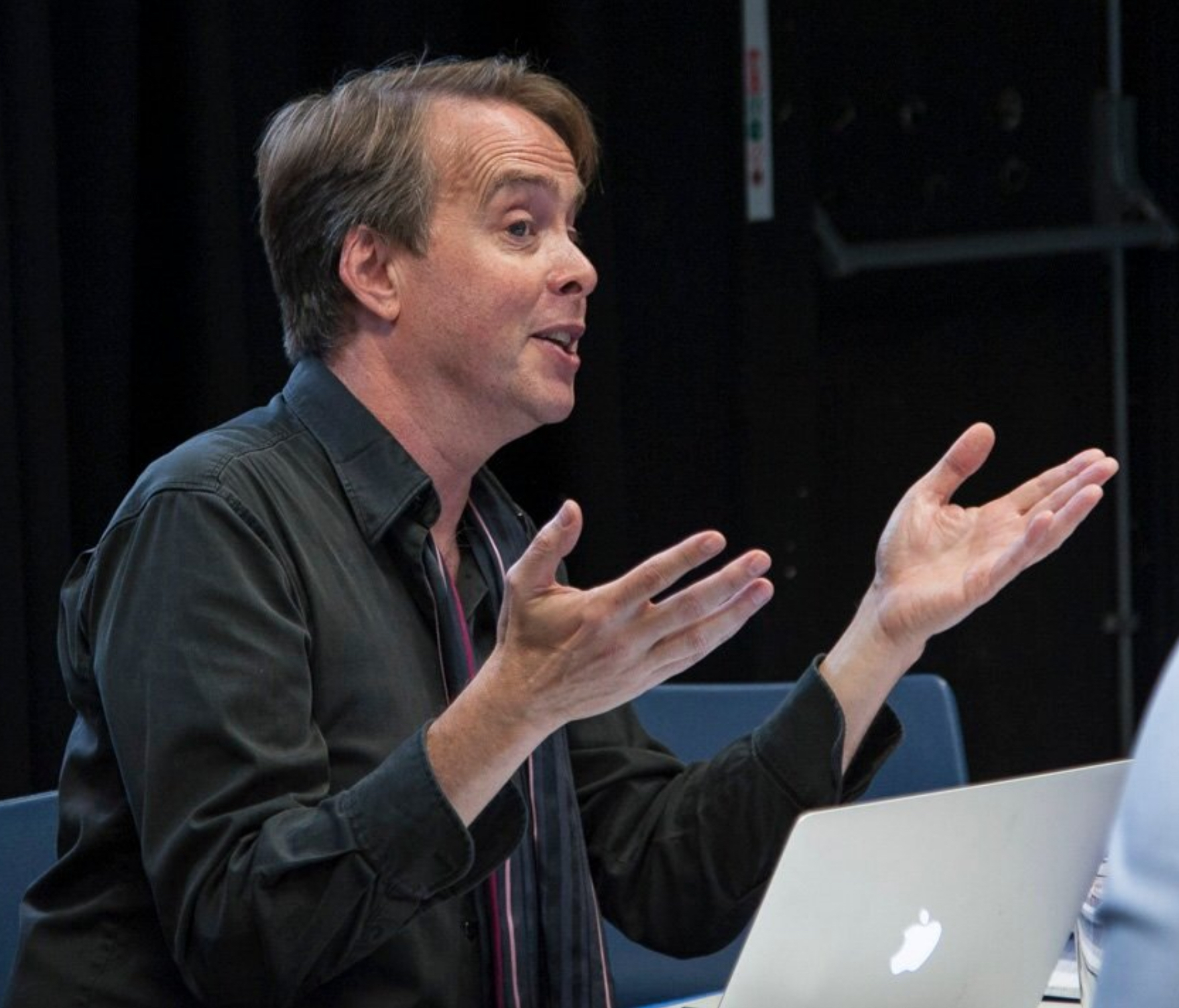
Spencer in 2019 during development and rehearsals for the musical, Are You As Nervous As I Am?

Simon Spencer (born 26 June 1959) is a British television and theatre producer, director and writer.

Spencer started his career in theatre before joining BBC Television and working mainly in Light Entertainment. He later went freelance and moved into children's television, for which he has received three BAFTA nominations as director and producer.

Spencer is writer and producer of a new British musical Are You As Nervous As I Am? that premièred in London in October 2022. The creative team included composer Leighton James House and lyricist Shaun McKenna.

== Early career ==
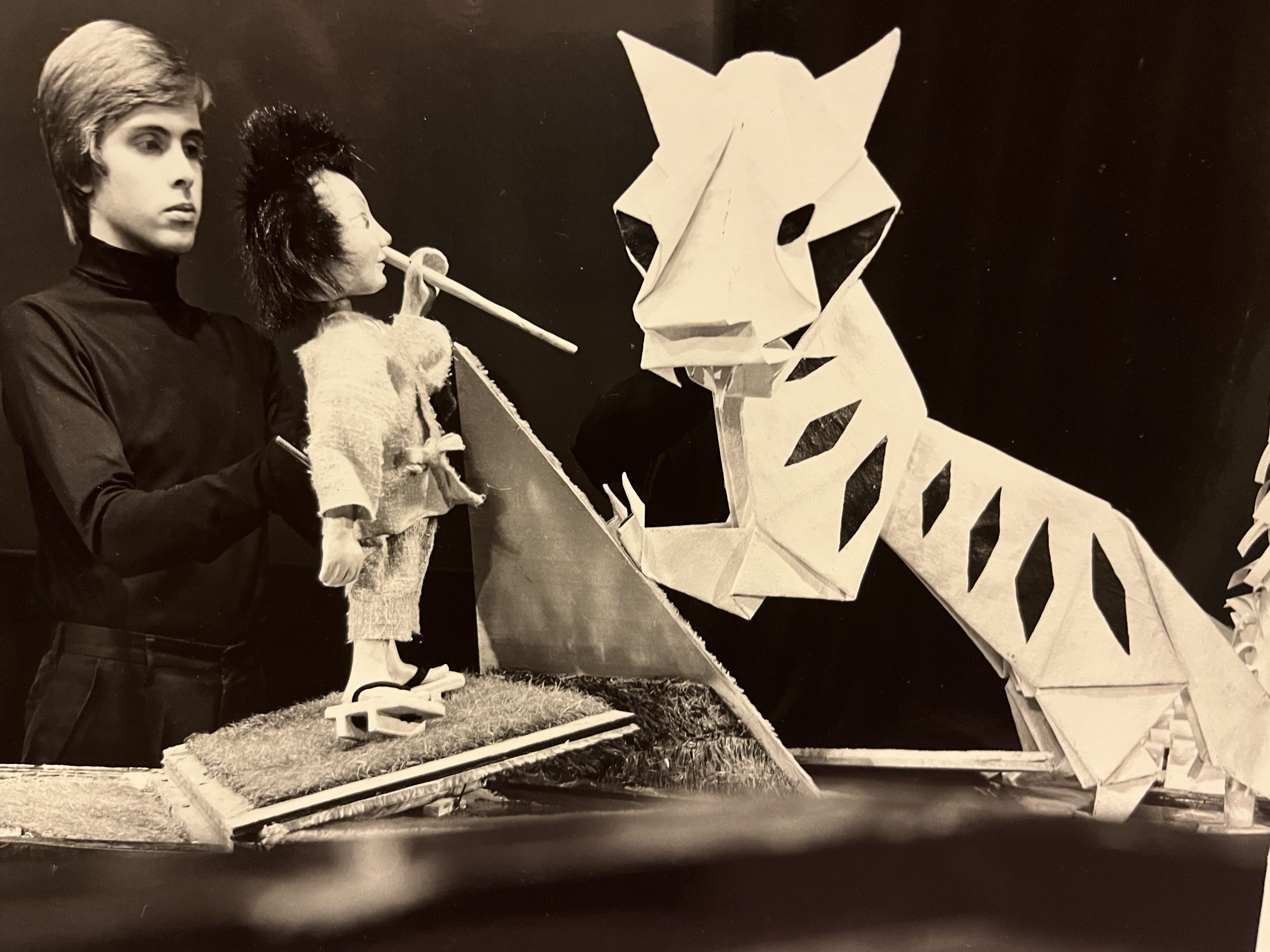
Simon Spencer in 1978, when he premièred the DaSilva Puppet Company’s bunraku production of Paper Tiger

In 1977, Spencer began his career as an assistant stage manager at the Mercury Theatre in Colchester. He later became a puppeteer at the DaSilva Puppet Company, which was unique in its position as Britain's largest and most successful unsubsidised puppet company. During that time, Spencer performed with shadow puppets, bunraku puppets, rod puppets and marionettes.

Spencer was appointed deputy stage manager and then stage manager at the Torch Theatre in Pembrokeshire, Wales. At that time he was the UK's youngest repertory theatre stage manager. Spencer joined BBC Television in 1983 as a Floor Assistant.

== Television: light entertainment ==
Working his way up the production ladder, from 1989 Spencer directed a number of high-profile entertainment programmes. These included popular stand-up, sketch shows, talk shows, situation comedy and music programming.

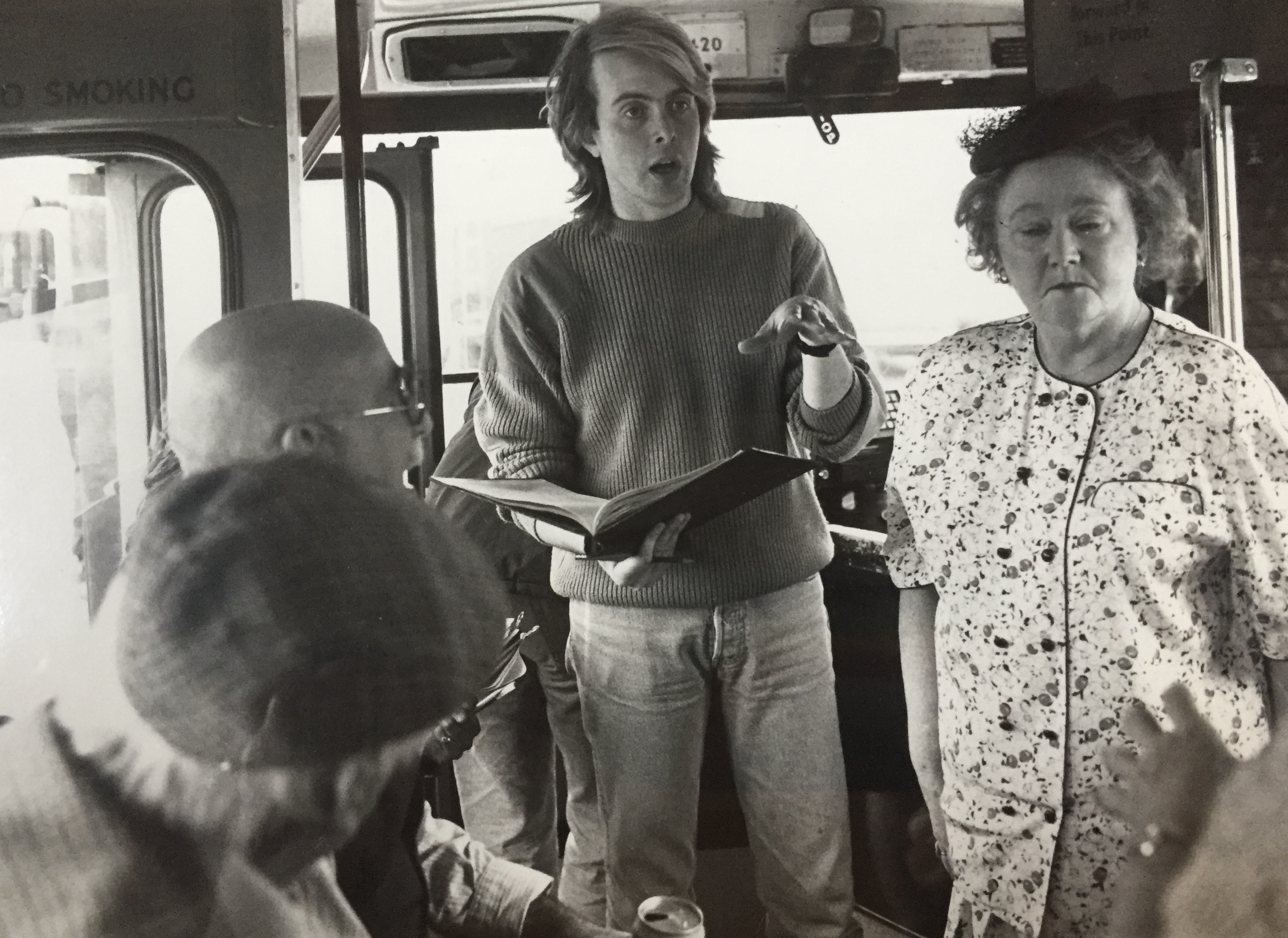
Simon Spencer at work during filming of In Sickness And In Health, Episode 5, Series 8 (1990). L-R: Arthur English (foreground), Warren Mitchell, Spencer, Carmel McSharry

Notable credits include: The Paul Daniels Magic Show (1989), In Sickness and in Health (1990), Rory Bremner (1991) and Wogan (1992). Spencer also co-directed The Laurence Olivier Awards (1993–1995).

Among Spencer's shows as a director are two BBC entries into the prestigious Golden Rose of Montreux festival (Rory Bremner in 1991 and The Rudy Coby Show in 1994), as well as ITV comedy series Gayle's World, 1997 winner of the Royal Television Society (RTS) Award for Best New Light Entertainment programme.

== Children's television ==
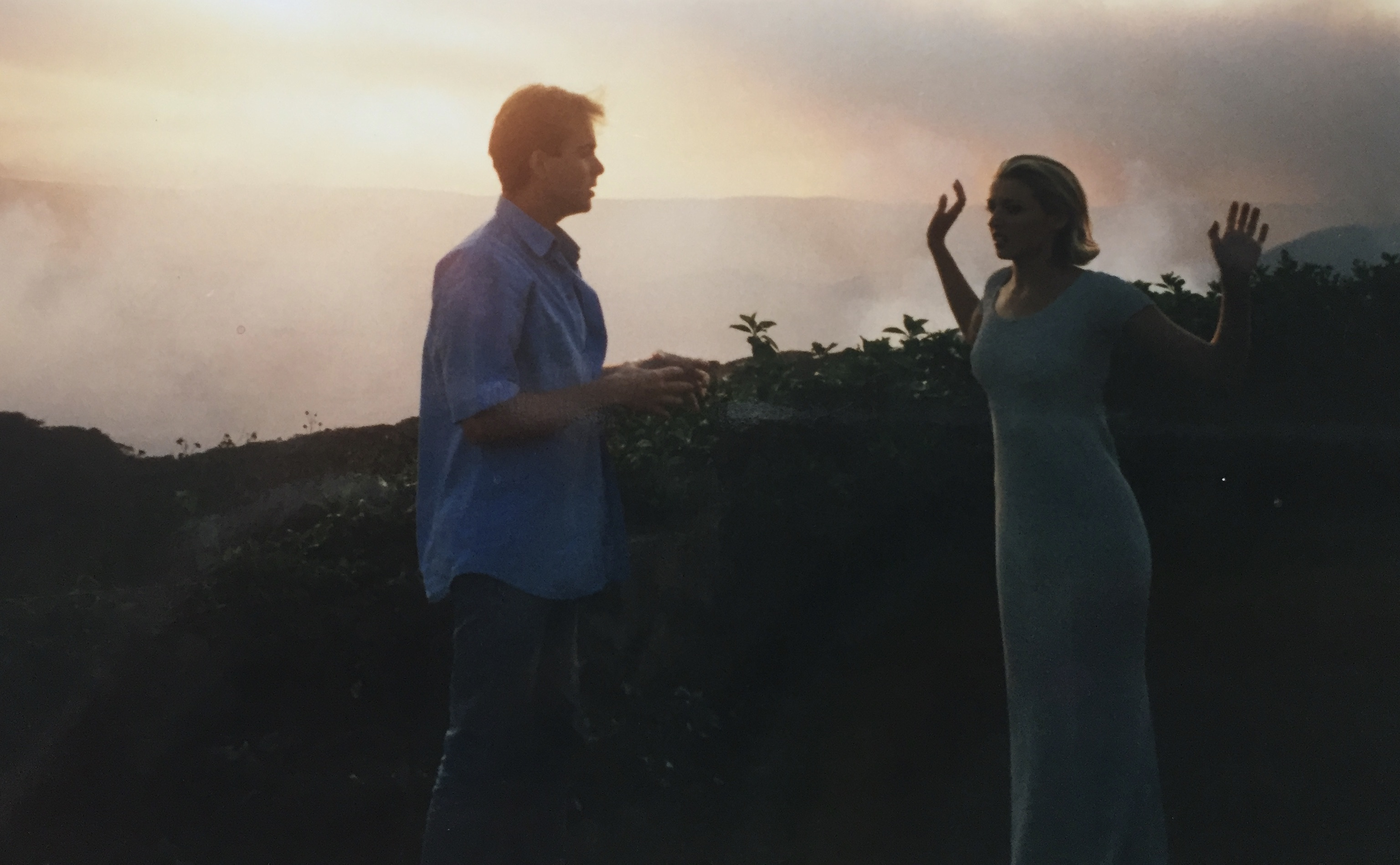
Producer Simon Spencer and presenter Dannii Minogue at the edge of the Ngorongroro crater in Tanzania, November 1995, during filming of On The Trail of The Lion King

In 1995 and 1996, Spencer produced and directed several international television specials for The Walt Disney Company including On The Trail Of The Lion King featuring Australian singer Dannii Minogue.

Since 1999, Spencer has specialised in directing and producing international preschool television series across various multimedia formats blending animation, live action, puppets and animatronics. Series include Moptatop's Shop (1999–2003) and the ground-breaking BAFTA-nominated Jim Henson's Construction Site (ITV 2001–2002).

In 2003, writer and producer Jocelyn Stevenson (Creative Director at HIT Entertainment) engaged Spencer to reimagine the classic Thomas & Friends stories and to develop the original five-minute format for a relaunch of the live action series for both PBS in the United States and Channel 5 in the UK (2003–2008). This provided Spencer with his second BAFTA nomination.

Other notable programmes, with Spencer working as both showrunner and series producer, include: Waybuloo (BBC 2008–2011), Cbeebies biggest preschool commission since the Teletubbies and again BAFTA nominated, described as a "show of wonder and delight" by the Daily Telegraph newspaper; Zack & Quack (Nickelodeon 2011–2014); and Jessy and Nessy (Amazon Prime 2018–19).

Television writing credits include:

- Hide & Peep (Thomas & Friends, 2007)
- Hector The Horrid (Thomas & Friends, 2007)
- Sir Handel In Charge (Thomas & Friends, 2007)
- The Party Surprise (Thomas & Friends, 2008)
- James Works It Out (Thomas & Friends, 2008)
- Don't Go Back (Thomas & Friends, 2008)

In 2013, Spencer was elected to the BAFTA TV committee with a special interest in children's TV. This included sitting on the BAFTA Kids committee for six years.

From 2021-23, Spencer produced the musical CBeebies series Nick Cope’s Popcast, again mixing live action with animation. English musician Nick Cope was previously lead singer in the rock band The Candyskins.

== 'Strong feelings' about preschool TV ==
Spencer is on record as having "strong feelings" about the challenges involved in creating new and engaging high-quality preschool content. Interviewed by Annabel Freyberg in the Daily Telegraph, he commented:

“You don't even know if kids will like the show till it gets out there. You're trying new characters, new music, a new style and a new format. Your only safeguard is putting together a team of highly experienced professionals who don't underestimate the specialities of pre-school.”

== Musical theatre: 'Are You As Nervous As I Am?' ==
In 2016, Spencer began collaborating with lyricist Shaun McKenna and composer Leighton James House to create the musical Are You As Nervous As I Am? Delayed due to the pandemic and lockdowns, the show only premièred at London's Greenwich Theatre on 1 October 2022, running until 23 October. The press release issued in June 2022 described this new British musical as "a strong female-driven story of empowerment: touching on disability, sexuality, abuse and race, with memorable characters and powerful original songs."

The production was directed by Phoebe Barran, with musical arrangements by Dr Matthew Malone, set and costume design by Kevin Jenkins, lighting by Mike Robertson, and movement by Denni Sayers. It starred Katie Elin-Salt as Peggy, a young and impressionable girl with a passion for singing, and Emma Thornett as Janet, "the runaway sister in search of a more honest life".
