= Savage (play) =

2027 play by Jonathan Harvey

- Original language: English
- Written by: Jonathan Harvey
- Based on: The life of Paul O'Grady

Premiere
- Date: 13 February 2027
- Place: Curve, Leicester
- Directed by: Nikolai Foster
- Official website

Savage is an upcoming play by Jonathan Harvey based on the life of British entertainer Paul O'Grady and his drag queen persona Lily Savage.

== Production ==
On 15 June 2026, it was announced that the play would make its world premiere at the Curve, Leicester on 13 February 2027, prior to a UK tour before a run in London's West End. It will be directed by the Curve's artistic director Nikolai Foster and will star Danny Beard as Paul O'Grady/Lily Savage.

The play had been in development for a number of years with the first draft of the script being sent to O'Grady a few months before his passing on 28 March 2023. It has since been developed with the support of O'Grady's husband André Portasio.
