= The One and Only (TV programme) =

- Genre: Entertainment; Music
- Presented by: Des O'Connor (2012); Paul O'Grady (2013, 2015)
- Starring: Des O'Connor (2012); Cilla Black (2013, 2015)
- Country of origin: United Kingdom
- Original language: English
- No. of episodes: 3

Original release
- Network: ITV
- Release: 8 April 2012 – 4 August 2015

Related
- ITV Specials

The One and Only... was a British entertainment show, celebrating some of Britain's best loved stars from the world of entertainment. The first show aired on 8 April 2012 and was presented by Des O'Connor. The second aired on 16 October 2013, which was presented by Paul O'Grady, starred the comedian's good friend, Cilla Black.

This series format would be considered a successor to ITV's long running similar series "An Audience with...", also featuring guest celebrity appearances.

== Episodes ==
Episode viewing figures from BARB. Viewing figures do not include numbers from ITV HD or ITV +1.

#	Date aired	Starring	Total viewers (millions)	ITV weekly rank
1	8 April 2012	Des O'Connor	3.56	20
2	16 October 2013	Cilla Black	4.02	17
2	4 August 2015	Cilla Black	3.23	12

=== Des O'Connor ===
The One and Only Des O'Connor was aired on 8 April 2012 to celebrate O'Connor's 80th Birthday. The show was presented by O'Connor and featured guests including Melanie Sykes, Bradley Walsh, Michelle Keegan, Katherine Kelly, Matt Lucas, Paul O'Grady and Robert Lindsay.

=== Cilla Black ===
The One and Only Cilla Black aired on 16 October 2013 and was hosted by Paul O'Grady. There were a number of guests who appeared in the episode including Christopher Biggins, Amanda Holden, Ringo Starr, Alison Moyet and Katie Melua.

Following Black's death on 1 August 2015, this episode was repeated on ITV on 4 August 2015. However, this was a specially adapted version of the episode and featured a tribute to Black from O'Grady.
