= Paul O'Grady on the Wireless =

- Other names: Paul O'Grady, TeamPOG, TeamPOGradio
- Genre: Music, talk
- Running time: 120 minutes
- Country of origin: United Kingdom
- Language: English
- Home station: BBC Radio 2 (2009–2022); Boom Radio (2022 Christmas Special)
- Hosted by: Paul O'Grady
- Produced by: Malcolm Prince
- Recording studio: Wogan House, London (2009–2020)
- Original release: 5 April 2009 – 25 December 2022
- No. of episodes: 547
- Audio format: Stereo/88–91 FM, DAB digital radio, TV and online
- Website: Official BBC Website

Paul O'Grady on the Wireless (billed as Paul O'Grady and referred to on-air as TeamPOG or TeamPOGradio) is the incarnation of the Sunday teatime show on BBC Radio 2 from 5 April 2009 to 14 August 2022, hosted by Paul O'Grady. It was produced by Malcolm Prince, who also made regular contributions to the programme, and it regularly attracted over two million listeners. It was broadcast on Sundays between 17:00 and 19:00.

From its inception until 13 February 2022, the show was broadcast every Sunday. On 2 February 2022, it was announced that BBC management had decided to reduce the number of shows per year from 40 to 26, and that O'Grady would take a break for three months, with the replacement programme hosted by Rob Beckett. O’Grady returned on 22 May 2022 for a new series of thirteen shows which ran until mid-August. He continued to broadcast from his home.

On 9 August 2022, it was announced that O'Grady would be leaving the network after fourteen years and that the final show of the series, the 546th edition on Sunday 14 August, would be the last to air on Radio 2. His producer Prince also left the BBC. Beckett replaced him full time on Sunday afternoons.

On 21 November 2022, Prince announced that he and O'Grady would return to host the annual Christmas Day special on Boom Radio, with O'Grady again broadcasting from home.

The show was to return for an Easter special on Boom Radio on 9 April 2023, and a regular slot in May but this was cancelled due to O'Grady's sudden death on 28 March and was replaced by a specially adapted repeat of his 2022 Christmas show, including an introduction by Prince. Plus, three of the show's specials were made available to listen to again on BBC Sounds and were re-broadcast by Radio 2.

The series was never actually billed or referred to as Paul O'Grady on the Wireless; in the Radio Times, it was simply listed as Paul O'Grady.

== Background ==
O'Grady confirmed in 2008 that he would be getting his own show on Radio 2 and no longer covering for presenters on other programmes.

The show marked O'Grady's permanent role as a Radio 2 presenter, following numerous stints standing in on other shows including Elaine Paige on Sunday.

The programme celebrated its 200th show on 24 February 2013, its 300th show on 17 May 2015, its 400th show on 11 February 2018, its 500th show on 28 March 2021, and its 10th birthday on 7 April 2019.

The programme was off-air from March to June 2020 due to the COVID-19 pandemic. It then aired a series of compilation shows, before returning for new pre-recorded shows on 9 August 2020, with O'Grady presenting from his home, rather than in the studio. The 11 April 2021 edition was cancelled following the death of Prince Philip two days earlier.

== Format ==
The show aired from 17:00 to 19:00 on Sundays and was often pre-recorded during the preceding week, although early in the show's run it had been broadcast live on most weeks. The show's format consisted of music intertwined with emails and messages from listeners, and regular features such as:

- All-Star Triple – Three tracks, played in a row, from the same artist. This first replaced the Motown Triple in the second hour of the programme from October 2010. However, at the end of the year, the All Star Triple replaced both the Northern Soul and Motown Triples and features in both hours.
- Thank You – A chance for listeners to say "thank you" to people that have made a positive difference to their lives. Each Thank You message read out by O'Grady on-air to the backing of Walk On by Jolley & Swain and received a "Certificate of Thanks" signed by O'Grady, and the best letter or email of the week, as also chosen by O'Grady, received a box of chocolates and a T-shirt.
- Cocktail Hour – An easy-listening track accompanied by a cocktail recommendation in the first hour of the programme.
- Lost TV Theme – Each week, in the second hour of the programme, O'Grady played a "lost" theme tune from an old television programme in full, as well as providing some background information about the programme.
- Wish You Were There – In the second hour of the programme, O'Grady played a relaxing piece of music designed to "whisk you away to your own piece of paradise". "Wish You Were There" did not feature in every edition of the programme.
- Hi-NRG Classic – Occasionally, O'Grady featured a "Hi-NRG Classic" as part of the playlist.
- Dead Pets – Listeners were invited to pay tribute to their deceased pets. O'Grady read out these letters or emails to "Just a Closer Walk with Thee".
- Lost Shops or Pubs – Listeners were invited to write or email to the show to inquire give information about their favourite "lost" shops or pubs.
- Lost Film – Occasionally, towards the end of the show, O'Grady read out a "lost film" inquiry that had been sent by a listener who wanted to know the name of a particular film that they have seen but cannot remember. This film was revisited during a future programme, where listeners' responses were read out.
- Lost Friends – Listeners were invited to email the show if they wished to get in touch with a person that they had lost contact with.
- It's a Small World – Whenever O'Grady read out a letter from a listener based outside the United Kingdom, an extract from the song "It's a Small World" (the title song to Disney's series of theme park rides) was played by producer Malcolm Prince. O'Grady acted disgusted and tried to ruin the clip as much as possible, as he apparently disliked the song.
- A Blast from Our Eurovision Past – O'Grady played a past Eurovision winning song in the second hour of the show.
- Classy Classical Choice – O'Grady played a classical music track in the second hour of the show.
- Northern Soul Triple – In the first hour of the programme, three Northern Soul tracks were played in a row. This feature was axed at the end of 2010 and replaced with the "All Star Triple". From January 2011, each week O'Grady featured a Northern Soul track and a Motown track in the playlist for any listeners who were missing the defunct triples.
- Motown Triple – In the second hour of the programme, three Motown tracks were played in a row. This feature was axed at the end of September 2010 and replaced with the "All Star Triple".
- Competition – In the first few months of the programme, listeners were invited to enter a light-hearted monthly competition. The first competition was entitled "Tea for Two on 2" and ran between April and July 2009. In the first round, the winner was given the opportunity to have tea with O'Grady and the team at the studios. In the other three months, the winner would receive a luxury hamper filled with tea, scones, biscuits and cakes, or could have tea with O'Grady and the team as the "booby prize". The second competition was entitled "Pressing Paul" and ran between August and October 2009. In each of these months, a listener could win the opportunity to have their washing and ironing taken care of by the show, in order to give themselves a break on a Sunday. O'Grady did not take any of the competitions seriously and told listeners "Please don't enter" and "You could win a luxury hamper filled with tea, scones, jams, biscuits, cakes and trifles...or you could opt for the booby prize and join me and the team for tea in the green room!". The competition feature was "rested" after the October 2009 competition but did not return.

=== Stand-in presenters ===
- Bill Kenwright (2009)
- Richard Allinson (2009)
- Jodie Prenger (2010–2012)
- Martine McCutcheon (2014)
- Len Goodman (2013–18)
- Nicki Chapman (2016)
- Alan Carr & Melanie Sykes (2017–20)
- Christopher Biggins (2017)
- Richard Madeley (2018)
- Gaby Roslin (2018)
- Matt Lucas (2019)
- Paddy O'Connell (2020–21)
- Patrick Kielty (2021)

=== Special editions ===
On 14 November 2010, Radio 2 hosted its annual "Children in Need Music Marathon". O'Grady was joined by Jodie Prenger in the studio from 16:00–19:00 on this day, as they took listener's requests, pledges and donations.

On 6 November 2011, the second hour of the show was dedicated to an interview with Susan Boyle.

On 13 November 2011, Radio 2 hosted its "Children in Need Jukebox". O'Grady presented the final two hours of the Jukebox, between 17:00 and 19:00. He was joined in the studio by Jane McDonald in the first hour and Nicki Chapman in the second hour, as they took listener's requests, pledges and donations.

The show had a lunchtime slot on Christmas Day from 2009 to 2017 and again from 2019 to 2021. O'Grady had also presented his own Christmas Day show in 2008 before his regular show began. The Christmas Day show returned for the last time in 2022 on Boom Radio.

== See also ==
- Elaine Paige on Sunday
- Weekend Wogan
