= Alison Hammond =

English television presenter (born 1975)

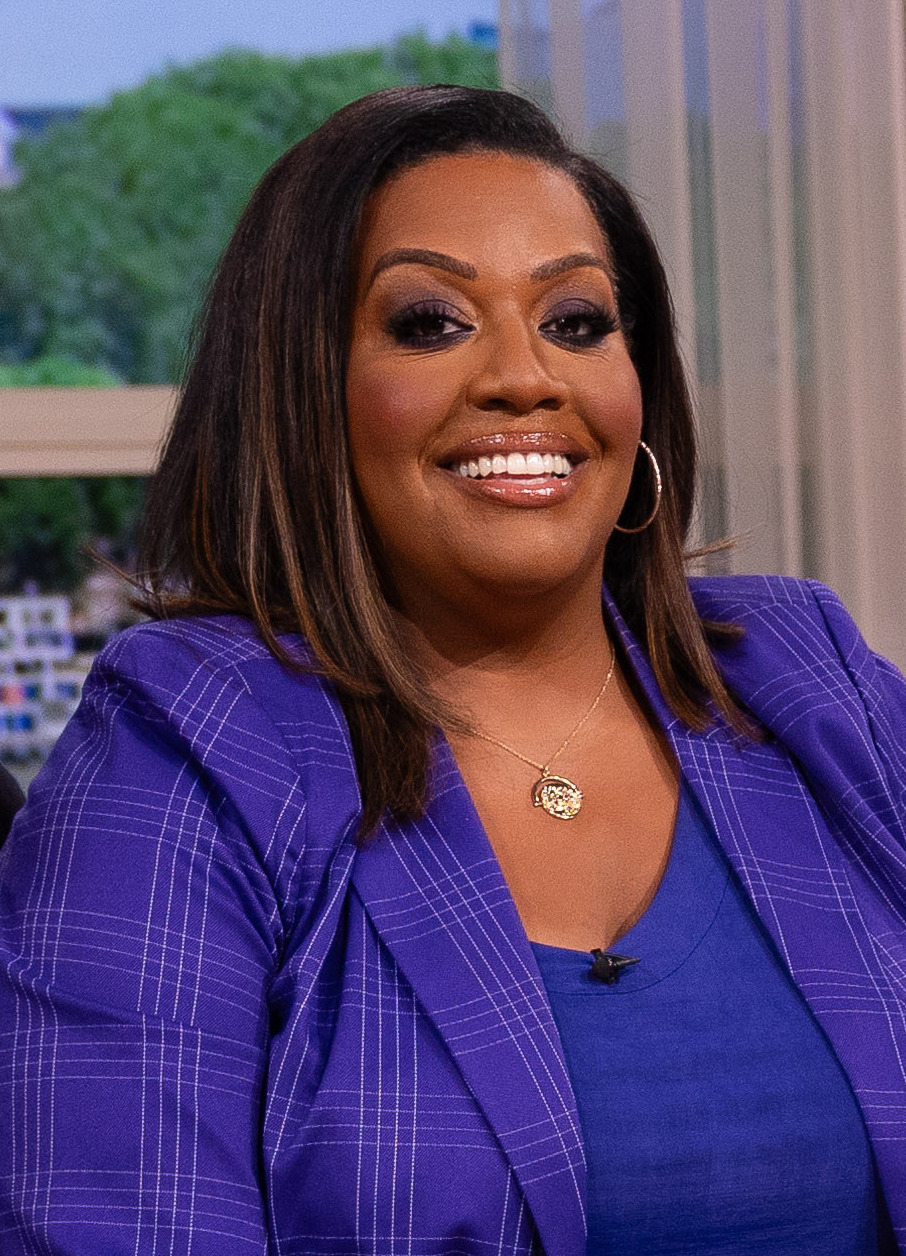
- Hammond in 2023
- Born: 5 February 1975 (age 51); Birmingham, England
- Occupations: Broadcaster; television personality
- Years active: 1988–present
- Employer(s): ITV; Channel 4
- Partner(s): Nourddine Boufaied (2003–2005); David Putman (2023–present)
- Children: 1

Alison Hammond (born 5 February 1975) is a British broadcaster and television personality. Since 2021, she has been a main co-presenter of ITV's This Morning on Fridays, school holidays and bank holidays alongside Dermot O'Leary. She has also co-presented the Channel 4 baking competition The Great British Bake Off alongside Noel Fielding since 2023.

Hammond came to prominence in 2002 as a contestant on the third series of the Channel 4 reality show Big Brother. She has also appeared on other reality shows, including I'm a Celebrity...Get Me Out of Here! (2010), Celebrity Coach Trip (2012), Strictly Come Dancing (2014), Celebrity Masterchef (2014), and I Can See Your Voice (2021–2022). In 2024, Hammond presented the ITV reality documentary series For the Love of Dogs.

== Early life ==
Hammond was born on 5 February 1975 to Jamaican parents and was raised in the north Birmingham district of Kingstanding. She has a sister and brother from her mother's previous marriage. She attended Cardinal Wiseman School. Her mother had several jobs concurrently, including one as a manager for Tupperware. Her father was married to another woman but her mother didn't find out until she was pregnant with Hammond. Her father, who worked as a bodyguard to Muhammad Ali when the boxer visited Birmingham, named Hammond and his two other children, her half-sister and brother after him. From the age of 11, Hammond participated in drama workshops run by Central Television, but lack of funds meant she was unable to attend drama school. She later moved to Hall Green in south Birmingham, and attended the Central Junior Television Workshop in Birmingham.

== Career ==
In 2002, Hammond competed on the third series of the Channel 4 reality series Big Brother. That same year, she appeared in an episode of the BBC soap opera Doctors in an acting role and also began presenting and reporting for ITV's This Morning. Hammond then appeared on many television programmes, including Celebrity Fit Club, Celebrities Under Pressure, and Big Star's Little Star. She has also appeared on Celebrity Stars in Their Eyes, performing as Nina Simone, Celebrity Ready Steady Cook, Daily Cooks Challenge, as a panellist on ITV's Loose Women, and as a presenter on the short-lived ITV Play channel. In 2004, Hammond played herself as a TV reporter in Christmas Lights opposite Robson Green. In 2008, Hammond was named as the face of online bingo site Crown Bingo and took part in live chats, voiced characters and can be heard as the bingo caller in the bingo room. In November 2010, Hammond became a contestant on the tenth series of I'm a Celebrity...Get Me Out of Here! and, on 28 November 2010, became the fourth contestant to leave the show.

In 2014, Hammond participated in the ninth series of Celebrity MasterChef on BBC One. She also participated in the twelfth series of Strictly Come Dancing in 2014 on BBC One. She partnered with 11th series' champion Aljaž Škorjanec. They were voted off in the seventh week of competition and finished 10th. On 19 November 2015, it was announced she would compete in the annual Strictly Christmas Special. Hammond made her Hollywood debut in the animated film Hotel Transylvania 3: Summer Vacation (2018). In 2020, ITV announced a shake-up of This Morning presenters, with Hammond replacing Eamonn Holmes and Ruth Langsford on a Friday, presenting alongside Dermot O'Leary. Hammond and O'Leary have since taken on the other days after the respective resignations of Phillip Schofield and Holly Willoughby in the summer and autumn of 2023 as part of a rotation of hosts.

In December 2020, Hammond appeared as a celebrity guest on game show The Wheel on BBC One. She also played the Countess in the Sainsbury's 2022 Christmas advert. Hammond then hosted the 76th British Academy Film Awards with Richard E. Grant. It was announced in March 2023 that Hammond would be the new co-host of The Great British Bake Off, replacing Matt Lucas.

From April 2024 she has presented For the Love of Dogs, following the death of original presenter Paul O'Grady.

As of January 2026, Hammond is the host of the official Bridgerton podcast on Netflix. On November 5, 2026, following the finale of the show's 22nd series, Hammond was announced to take part in the Taskmaster New Year Treat 2026 special, alongside Chesney Hawkes, Francis Bourgeois, Maryam Moshiri, and Robert Rinder.

== Personal life ==
Hammond was engaged to Manchester-based taxi driver Nourddine Boufaied. The couple were together for two years before separating. They have one son, born in 2005. Hammond has been in a relationship with David Putman since late 2023. She lives near Solihull, West Midlands.

== Filmography ==
Year	Title	Role	Note(s)
1988–1990	Palace Hill	Eskimo	Main role
1991	Chalkface	Alice	Episode: "Christmas Cheer"
1997	The Locksmith	WPC Leigh	Episode: "Coming Together"
2002	Big Brother	Herself	Contestant; 11th place
2002	Doctors	Danielle	Episode: "Tears of a Clown"
2002, 2004, 2006, 2019	Loose Women	Herself	Herself (2 episodes), guest panellist (2002, 2004)
2002–present	This Morning	Herself	Reporter and presenter (2002–2021), main presenter (2021–)
2003	Doctors	Theresa Holyoake	Episodes: "A Red Light Means Stop: Part 1" and "A Red Light Means Stop Part: 2"
2004	Celebrity Fit Club	Herself	Contestant
2004	Celebrity Stars in Their Eyes	Herself	Performed as Nina Simone
2004	Christmas Lights	Herself	
2006–2007	ITV Play	Herself	This Morning Puzzlebook Quiz Show
2010	I'm a Celebrity...Get Me Out of Here!	Herself	Contestant; 10th place
2012	Celebrity Coach Trip	Herself	Contestant
2012–2014	Big Brother's Bit On The Side	Herself	4 episodes
2013	Celebrity Big Brother	Herself	1 episode
2014	Celebrity MasterChef	Herself	Contestant
2014	Strictly Come Dancing	Herself	Contestant; 10th place
2016	The Dumping Ground	Rowena Spike	Episodes: "Lost and Found" and "Bear-Faced Liar"
2017	Sugar Free Farm	Herself	Participant
2017	Let's Sing and Dance	Herself	Participant
2018	The Time It Takes	Herself	Co-host
2018	Celebrity Haunted Mansion	Herself	Participant
2018	Hotel Transylvania 3: Summer Vacation	Frankenginger (voice)	Movie
2020	Celebs Go Dating	Herself	Series 8
2020	The Great Stand Up to Cancer Bake Off	Herself	Series 3
2021	I Can See Your Voice	Herself	
2021	Ant & Dec's Saturday Night Takeaway	Herself	Series 17
2022	RuPaul's Drag Race UK	Herself	Series 4
2022	The Masked Singer: I'm a Celebrity Special	Herself	Performed as Witchetty Grub
2022	Alison Hammond In at the Rich End: The Riviera	Herself	Documentary
2023	The British Academy Film Awards	Herself	Host
2023–present	The Great British Bake Off	Herself	Co host; Alongside Noel Fielding, replaced Matt Lucas
2024–present	Alison Hammond: For the Love of Dogs	Herself	Replaced Paul O'Grady
2024–present	Rob Beckett's Smart TV	Herself	Team captain
2025	Alison Hammond's Florida Unpacked	Herself	Ten-part series
2025	Alison Hammond's Big Weekend	Herself	Six-part series
2026	Your Song	Herself	Host
2026	Taskmaster New Year Treat	Herself	Contestant
TBA	Name That Tune	Herself	Host

=== Guest appearances ===
- Celebrities Under Pressure (July 2004)
- Hell's Kitchen (April 2009)
- Hole in the Wall (October 2009)
- Angela and Friends (January 2010) – 3 episodes
- All Star Family Fortunes (December 2010) – Contestant, This Morning vs Emmerdale
- Celebrity Who Wants to Be a Millionaire? (December 2012) – Contestant
- Big Star's Little Star (9 April 2014) – Contestant
- Weekend (3 May 2014) – Herself
- Who's Doing the Dishes? (2014) – Celebrity chef
- Celebrity Squares (19 April 2015) – Guest
- The Chase: Celebrity Special (1 May 2016) – Contestant
- Hacker Time (August 2016) – Guest
- Tipping Point: Lucky Stars (22 October 2017) – Contestant
- Catchphrase (British game show) (9 December 2018) – Contestant
- Harry Hill's Alien Fun Capsule (8 June 2019) – Guest
- Hollyoaks (14 June 2019) – Guest
- Joe Lycett's Got Your Back (29 May 2020) – Guest
- Big Brother: Best Shows Ever (22 June 2020) – Guest
- DNA Journey (6 October 2022) – Guest
- Saving Grace podcast (26 October 2022) – Guest
- Michael McIntyre's Big Show (4 February 2024) - Midnight Gameshow

=== Stage appearances ===
- The Rocky Horror Show (as the Narrator) - The Alexandra, Birmingham - 2019
- Jack and the Beanstalk (as the Spirit of the Beans) - Birmingham Hippodrome - 2023–24
- Peter Pan (as the Magical Mermaid) - Birmingham Hippodrome - 2024–25

== Books written ==
- You've Got To Laugh: Stories from a Life Lived to the Full (Penguin, 2022) ISBN 9780552178563
- Bombshell (Bantam, 2024) ISBN 9781787635258
