= Gayle's World =

British television comedy sketch show

- Genre: Comedy; Sketch comedy Parody
- Written by: Brenda Gilhooly; Nichola Hegarty
- Directed by: Tom Poole (Pilot); Simon Spencer (Series)
- Starring: Brenda Gilhooly as Gayle Tuesday
- Country of origin: United Kingdom
- Original language: English
- No. of series: 1
- No. of episodes: 6 (inc. 1 pilot)

Production
- Executive producers: John Bishop (Pilot); Nick Symons (Series)
- Producers: Dave Morley (Pilot); Pete Ward (Series)
- Running time: 25 minutes (inc. adverts)
- Production companies: TV21; Carlton Television

Original release
- Network: ITV
- Release: 11 June 1996 – 23 July 1997

Gayle's World is a British television sketch and parody comedy series was produced by TV21 for Carlton Television for the ITV network and that originally aired for a pilot and one series between 11 June 1996 and 23 July 1997. It starred comedienne and writer Brenda Gilhooly as her comic alter-ego, the glamorous and air-headed model "Gayle Tuesday".

== Cast ==
Over the pilot and the one series, Tuesday was joined by a number of other performers:

=== Pilot ===
- Sheila Hancock
- Anna Karen
- Russell Grant
- Carol Hawkins

=== Series One ===
- Gabrielle Glaister
- Vicki Michelle
- Danniella Westbrook
- Sara Cox
- Kathy Lloyd
- Mem Ferda
- Charlotte Coleman
- Ken Andrew

== Transmissions ==
Series	Episodes	Originally released	
Series	Episodes	First released	Last released
Gayle's World		11 June 1996	
1	6	18 June 1997	23 July 1997

== Awards ==
Gayle's World won the "Best Light Entertainment Show" at the Royal Television Awards in 1997.
