= Lily Live! =

- Genre: Comedy Entertainment
- Presented by: Lily Savage
- Starring: Gayle Tuesday
- Country of origin: United Kingdom
- Original language: English
- No. of series: 2
- No. of episodes: 11 (inc. 1 special)

Production
- Running time: 50 minutes (inc. adverts)
- Production companies: Wildflower Productions and Carlton Television

Original release
- Network: ITV
- Release: 2 September 2000 – 27 December 2001

Lily Live! is a comedy entertainment show that aired on ITV from 2 September 2000 to 27 December 2001 and is hosted by Lily Savage.

== Transmissions ==
=== Series ===
Series	Start date	End date	Episodes
1	2 September 2000	7 October 2000	6
2	7 September 2001	12 October 2001	5

=== Special ===
Date	Title
27 December 2001	Lily Not Live
