= Paul O'Grady =

British comedian, actor and television presenter (1955–2023)

Paul O'Grady MBE DL
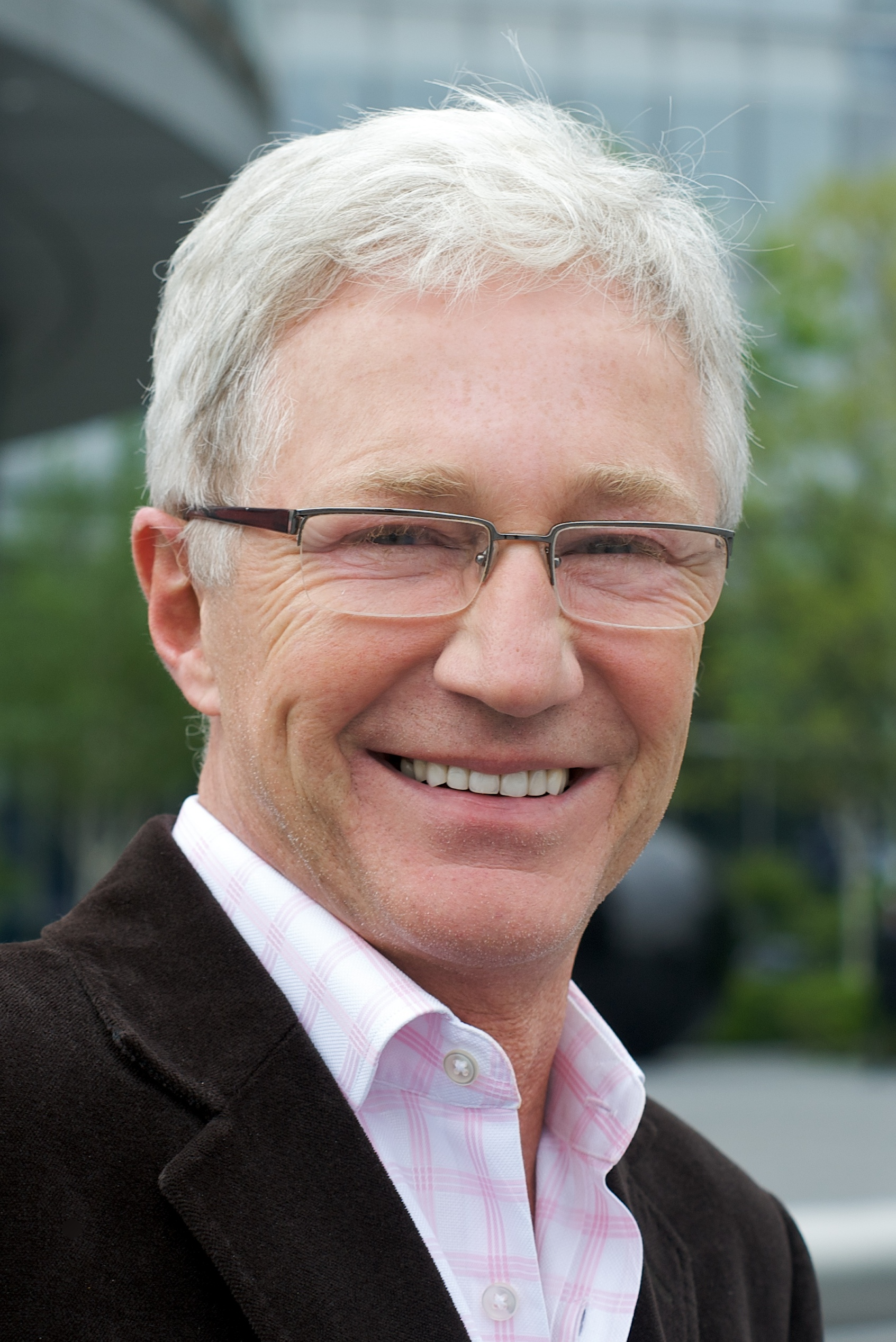
- O'Grady in 2009
- Born: Paul James O'Grady; 14 June 1955; Tranmere, Cheshire, England
- Died: 28 March 2023 (aged 67); Aldington, Kent, England
- Burial place: Church of St Rumwold, Bonnington, England
- Occupations: Broadcaster; comedian; drag queen; actor; writer
- Years active: 1978–2023
- Spouses: Teresa Fernandes (m. 1977; div. 2005); André Portasio (m. 2017)
- Children: 1

Paul James O'Grady (14 June 1955 – 28 March 2023) was an English drag queen, comedian, broadcaster, actor, and writer. He achieved notability in the London gay scene during the 1980s with his drag persona Lily Savage, through which he gained wider popularity in the 1990s. O'Grady subsequently dropped the character and in the 2000s became the presenter of various television and radio shows, including The Paul O'Grady Show.

Born to a working-class Irish migrant family in Tranmere, Cheshire, O'Grady moved to London in the late 1970s, initially working as a peripatetic care officer for Camden Council. He developed his drag act in 1978, basing the character of Lily Savage upon traits found among female relatives. Touring England as part of drag mime duo the Playgirls, O'Grady then went solo as a stand-up comedian in the early 1980s. Performing as Savage for eight years at a South London gay pub, the Royal Vauxhall Tavern (RVT), he gained a popular following among London's gay community and used his character to speak out for gay rights. After being nominated for a 1992 Perrier Comedy Award, O'Grady attracted mainstream attention and made various television, radio, and theatrical appearances. As Savage, he presented the television shows The Big Breakfast (1995–1996), Blankety Blank (1997–2002), and Lily Live! (2000–2001), earning various awards and becoming a well known public figure.

Wishing to diversify from Savage, O'Grady starred in the BBC One sitcom Eyes Down (2003–2004) and presented two travel documentaries for ITV. In 2004, he began presenting ITV's daytime chat show The Paul O'Grady Show. After the network refused to transfer creative control of the series to O'Grady's production company Olga TV, he moved to Channel 4 in 2006, where the show was rebranded as The New Paul O'Grady Show, airing until 2009. O'Grady presented the late night ITV show Paul O'Grady Live (2010–2011) and BBC Radio 2's Paul O'Grady on the Wireless (2009–2022). Additional television shows included Paul O'Grady: For the Love of Dogs (2012–2023), Paul O'Grady's Animal Orphans (2014–2016), Blind Date (2017–2019), and Paul O'Grady's Great British Escape (2020). He also published several books, including a four-volume memoir.

O'Grady was appointed a Member of the Order of the British Empire (MBE) in the 2008 Birthday Honours for services to entertainment. In 2020 he became president of the British Music Hall Society, taking over the role from Roy Hudd. On 31 October 2022 he was appointed as a Deputy Lieutenant for the County of Kent, where he lived for many years.

== Early life ==
=== 1955–1971: Childhood ===
O'Grady was born on 14 June 1955 at St. Catherine's Hospital in the Tranmere area of Birkenhead, Cheshire (now Merseyside). His father, Patrick "Paddy" Grady (1912–1973), was Irish and had grown up in Ballincurry, County Roscommon, before moving to England in 1936 and settling in the working-class area of Birkenhead. His name was changed from "Grady" to "O'Grady" in a paperwork mistake when he joined the Royal Air Force, and he kept the new name. Patrick married Mary "Molly" Savage (1916–1988), who was born in England to Irish immigrants from County Louth. Paul was their third child; his birth came over a decade after those of brother Brendan (born 1941) and sister Sheila (born 1944).

O'Grady spent his early life at the family's rented home at 23 Holly Grove in Higher Tranmere. He later said, "When I look back on my childhood I have no bad memories. Our family was loving and full of affection. I never knew what divorce was until I moved to London. I was an indulged child and completely protected from anything bad." Attending St. Joseph's Catholic Primary School, O'Grady excelled in all subjects except mathematics. Hoping that he had a good future ahead of him, his parents budgeted to send him to a private school, the Catholic-run Redcourt, but his grades dropped. Failing the eleven plus exam, he was unable to enter a grammar school so attended the Blessed Edward Campion R.C. Secondary Modern and the Corpus Christi High School. It was at the school that O'Grady experienced his first homosexual encounter, enjoying a brief romance with another boy, although he still assumed he was heterosexual.

A fan of television series The Avengers and Batman, O'Grady was enrolled in the Cub Scouts by his mother, but he hated it, leaving after a month. An altar boy at a local Catholic church, he was dismissed after laughing during a funeral service. He then joined the Marine Cadet Section of the Sea Cadet Corps, later commenting that he was following in the footsteps of his childhood hero, the cartoon character Popeye. He enjoyed the cadets, and at the advice of his captain joined the Boys' Amateur Boxing Club, developing a lifelong love of the sport. Playing truant from school, he got into trouble with his parents, and subsequently with the police after burgling a house with three friends. O'Grady's first job was a paper round that he kept for a week, and through this and other jobs, he saved up to afford Mod clothes, for a time becoming a suedehead.

=== 1972–1977: Early adulthood ===
Leaving school aged 16, O'Grady obtained a job in the civil service, working as a clerical assistant for the DHSS at their Liverpool office; he commuted in from his parents' Tranmere home. Supplementing this income, he worked part-time at the bar of the Royal Air Forces Association (RAFA) club in Oxton. Called for a disciplinary hearing at the DHSS and accused of incompetent behaviour and tardiness, he resigned. Obtaining a job at the Wheatsheaf Hotel in Virginia Water, Surrey, aged 17, O'Grady moved there; the management accused him of stealing, which he denied.

Promptly returning to Birkenhead, he increasingly socialised within the Liverpudlian gay scene, attending meetings of the Campaign for Homosexual Equality and working at a gay bar called the Bear's Paw; this was kept a secret from his parents, to whom he was not "out of the closet". He also had casual sex with a female friend, Diane Jansen, who became pregnant, news which O'Grady discovered in the same week that both his parents suffered heart attacks; his mother made a recovery, but his father died. Following the birth of his daughter, Sharon Lee Jansen, in May 1974, O'Grady agreed to pay towards her upkeep, but refused to marry Jansen, recognising his homosexuality.

Briefly working as an assistant clerk at Liverpool Magistrates' Court, O'Grady subsequently worked as a barman at Yates's Wine Lodge, supplementing the income with the occasional night at the Bear's Paw. Realising this wage was insufficient to support both himself and his daughter, he travelled to London, lodging in Westbourne Green, but found only poorly paid work as a barman. In London, he began associating with drag queens, particularly a couple who used the stage name of the Harlequeens. Although making friends in the city, O'Grady was homesick and returned to Birkenhead. Employed as an accountant in a FMC Meats Merseyside abattoir, he then worked for three years at the Children's Convalescent Home and School in West Kirby, a home for disabled and abused children.

Returning to London, he rented a flat in Crouch End and began busking with a friend in Camden Town before obtaining a job as a physiotherapist's assistant at the Royal Northern Hospital. Made redundant by public sector cuts, O'Grady took up a job at a gay club called the Showplace, befriending a Portuguese lesbian named Teresa Fernandes. In May 1977, they married to prevent her deportation; they lost contact and only legally divorced in 2005. Taking up jobs as a cleaner and a waiter at private functions, he began working for Camden Council as a peripatetic care officer. Living in with elderly people and dysfunctional families would have a lasting effect on him.

== Career in drag ==
=== 1978–1984: Lily Savage and the drag circuit ===
I've frequently been asked over the years who Lily Savage was based on and I've always answered that it was no one in particular and she was just a figment of my imagination. The truth, I realise now, is that Lily owes a lot to the women I encountered in my childhood. Characteristics and attitudes were observed and absorbed, Aunty Chris's in particular, and they provided the roots and compost for the Lily that would germinate and grow later on.

— Paul O'Grady, 2008

While working for Camden Social Services, O'Grady made his first attempt at putting together a drag act, creating the character of Lily Savage; he later said, "I wanted to get up there but be larger than life, a creature that was more cartoon than human." His debut was on the afternoon of 7 October 1978 at The Black Cap gay pub in Camden, where his act involved miming the words to Barbra Streisand's "Nobody Makes a Pass at Me" from the show Pins and Needles. Following a holiday to Poland, he visited an ex-boyfriend in Manila in the Philippines, there working briefly as a barman and waiter at a brothel.

Returning to London, O'Grady moved to Purley and then Streatham with a drag act, the Glamazons. With one of them, nicknamed "Hush", he founded a two-man drag mime act, the Playgirls, although found little work in London. Agreeing to a tour of northern England, they moved to Slaithwaite, West Yorkshire, also accepting a month's work at a club in Copenhagen, Denmark. Diversifying their act, O'Grady learned fire eating and developed a striptease while wearing a fat suit he named "Biddy". After Hush returned to London, O'Grady continued his drag performance as a solo act under the name of "Paul Monroe", a reference to Marilyn Monroe. Under financial strain, O'Grady moved back in with his mother in Birkenhead. Amid mass unemployment, O'Grady briefly lived off the dole before resurrecting the Playgirls with his friend Vera; initially performing in Liverpool, where they were caught up in the 1981 Toxteth riots, they began touring other parts of northern England until returning to London.

Again working as a support worker for Camden Council Social Services, O'Grady lived in Vauxhall and then Brixton before reviving the Playgirls with Hush, devising an act based upon the film What Ever Happened to Baby Jane? At the end of the year, he appeared as an Ugly Sister in a drag pantomime of Cinderella. In March 1983 he joined the Equity union, allowing him to take a role in the theatrical adaptation of If They'd Asked for a Lion Tamer at the Donmar Warehouse. The Playgirls gained bookings to appear across London, and also in Amsterdam and Copenhagen; O'Grady and Hush joined with drag artist David Dale to form an act known as "LSD", which stood for "Lily, Sandra, and Doris". Devising an act that parodied children's television show Andy Pandy, they gained bookings across London and in Edinburgh.

=== 1984–1992: Residency in Vauxhall ===
In 1984, O'Grady began work as a barman at a Vauxhall gay pub, the Elephant and Castle. As Lily, he compered "Ladies Night" each Tuesday, where amateur drag acts would perform. As compere, he tried out comedy routines, becoming known for insulting both the acts and the audience; he attracted growing crowds and he was interviewed by artist Patrick Procktor. After six months, he transferred his act to the nearby Royal Vauxhall Tavern (RVT) gay pub, re-opening his show on Thursday nights as "Stars of the Future". In 1985 he obtained his own council flat in Vauxhall's Victoria Mansions. During the mid-1980s, he entered a relationship with Brendan "Murph" Murphy, the manager of a gay sauna near the Oval, Kennington. Murphy subsequently became O'Grady's manager.

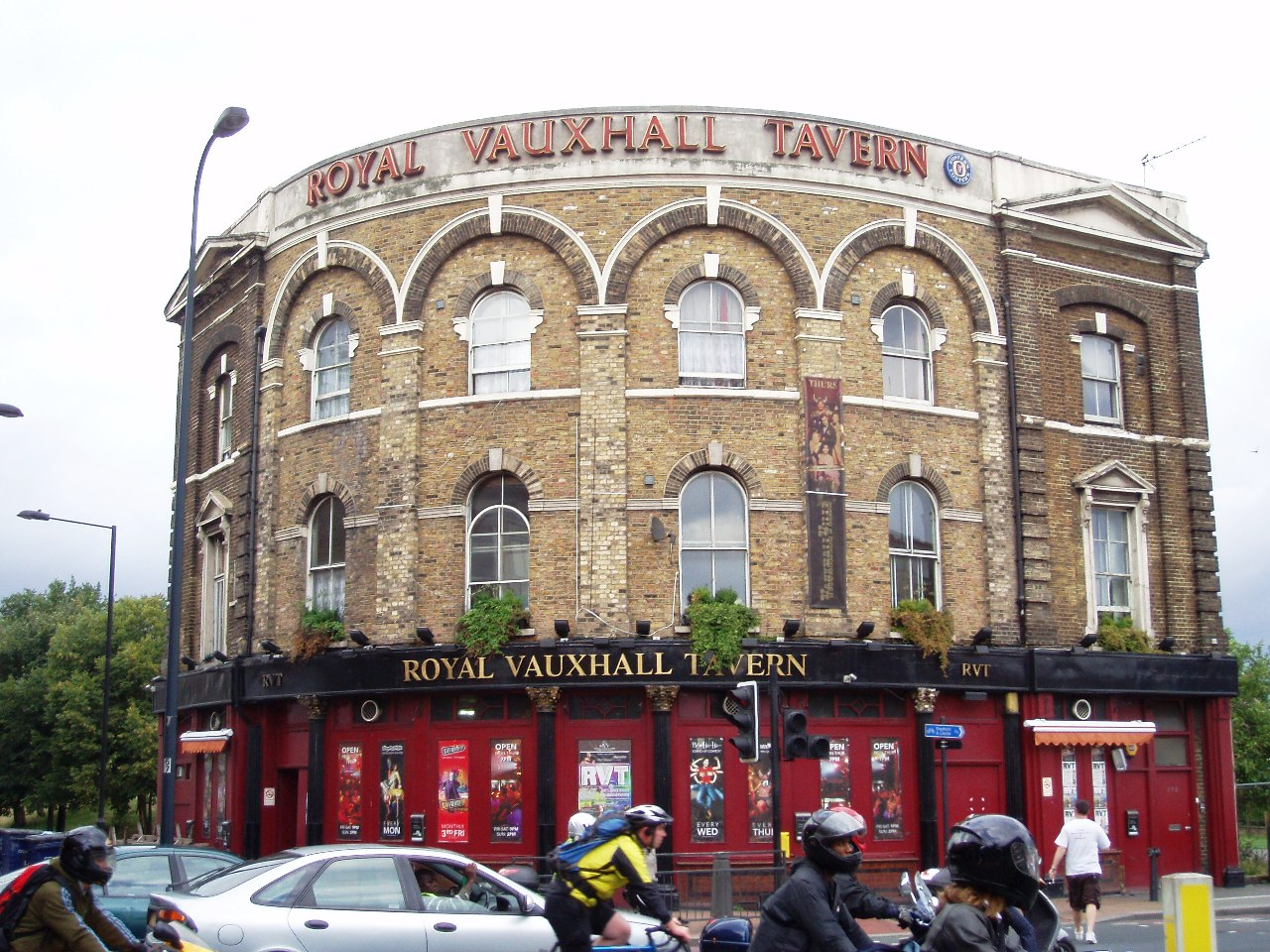
In 1985, O'Grady began compering in the role of Lily Savage at the Royal Vauxhall Tavern (RVT).

Eventually appearing at the RVT three times a week, on Sundays O'Grady began performing at the Union Tavern in Camberwell and the Goldsmiths Tavern in New Cross, where he often preceded Vic Reeves' three-hour show Vic Reeves Big Night Out. Quitting his council work, he focused full-time on his career as Lily, taking his act across the country and abroad. Other venues he performed at included the Madame Jojo's club in Soho, the Bloomsbury Theatre, and the Heaven nightclub. Befriending American drag queen Divine and his manager Bernard Jay, Jay booked O'Grady to appear in Fort Lauderdale, Florida. As Divine had done, O'Grady also recorded his own Hi-NRG song, "Tough at the Top", which was produced by DJ Ian Levine. In 1988, he performed as Madame in The Scythe of Reason, and appeared at the Glasgow Mayfest, where he developed a lifelong friendship with actor Ian McKellen.

O'Grady used his act to speak out on issues affecting the gay community, especially during the HIV/AIDS crisis. In April 1988 he took part in a march against Section 28, a policy introduced by Margaret Thatcher's Conservative government that many denounced as homophobic. Regularly doing charity fundraisers for HIV/AIDS research, many of his friends died from AIDS-related complications; he later related that "People my age will never get over the horrors." He performed in a play about the disease at the King's Head Theatre in Islington, befriending co-star Amanda Mealing.

From 1989 to 1992 O'Grady performed annually as Lily at the Edinburgh Fringe, gaining increasing recognition. He was nominated for the 1991 Perrier Award alongside Jack Dee, Eddie Izzard, and (the ultimate winner) Frank Skinner. He later related that "The Edinburgh Festival changed my life. The experience opened doors for me that would otherwise have been firmly closed, exposing me to a much wider audience than I'd previously been used to." O'Grady followed this with a show titled Lily Savage Live from the Hackney Empire; a sell-out, it was the first time that his performance was recorded. In 1992 he embarked on an Australian tour, performing alongside the Australian comedian Mark Trevorrow, and proceeded to Los Angeles, where he was present for the 1992 riots in that city.

O'Grady obtained his breakthrough into television when he played the character of a transvestite prostitute informant, Roxanne, in three episodes of ITV's police drama The Bill between 1988 and 1990. Just before filming on the first episode, O'Grady's mother died. In 1990 he appeared in the ITV miniseries Chimera as a social worker; during filming he befriended co-star Liza Tarbuck. He followed this with a performance as a Marlene Dietrich-style cabaret singer in an episode of Rik Mayall's ITV comedy The New Statesman. He had continued to perform regularly at the RVT, and after the proprietors Pat and Breda McConnor decided to move on, he and Murphy unsuccessfully sought to replace them. O'Grady never performed at the RVT again after the McConnors left.

=== 1992–1998: Mainstream success ===
After leaving the RVT, O'Grady continued to tour as Lily and released VHS videos of his performances. Gaining further public exposure through an appearance on the late-night Channel 4 comedy show Viva Cabaret!, he appeared on an episode of BBC quiz show That's Showbusiness. Moving into radio, he began making regular appearances as Lily on Woman's Hour and Loose Ends. Also moving into film, he travelled to Dublin, Ireland to play an inmate in the 1993 film In the Name of the Father; although not in the Lily character, he was credited as "Paul Savage". In character as Lily, he appeared on an October 1994 episode of BBC series The Steve Wright People Show, had a cameo in the soap Brookside the following month, and presented an episode of BBC music show Top of the Pops. He also appeared as a female pirate in an episode of BBC children's show Pirates.

Employed to narrate the BBC 2 series Life Swaps, he was also given his own late-night Channel 4 series, Live from the Lilydrome, which was filmed in a working men's club in Blackpool. Given top billing at the gay rights charity Stonewall's 1994 Equality Show in Albert Hall, he also played the role of Nancy in the London Palladium's performance of the musical Oliver!. Reflecting his increasing success in mainstream British comedy, in 1994 he was nominated for both Top Live Stand-Up Comedian and Top Television Comedy Newcomer at the British Comedy Awards. Some in the South London gay scene were critical of O'Grady, accusing him of being a sell out; he fiercely denied these accusations, stating that "I've done nearly ten years on the factory floor and now I feel I deserve a shot in the office."

After Paula Yates resigned as presenter of the Channel 4 morning television programme The Big Breakfast, its production company Planet 24 employed O'Grady to replace her. A four-week Lie-in with Lily was commissioned as a trial run. As Lily, O'Grady ignored the suggested questions of PR agents and instead asked personal questions of his guests; having attracted 2 million viewers, Planet 24 renewed his contract to keep him on as presenter. Through contacts made in showbusiness, he befriended many A-list celebrities, among them Elton John and Cher. O'Grady found the early morning starts difficult, particularly as he was also appearing as Lily in a musical version of Prisoner Cell Block H at the Queen's Theatre in London's West End. When the musical then toured the UK, O'Grady took a break from The Big Breakfast to accompany it.

He took his new dog, a Shih Tzu-Bichon Frisé cross named Buster, with him on tour; O'Grady later commented that "He was never happier than in a TV studio or theatre... Buster knew all the theatre doormen and loved being fussed over. He was a smashing dog." At the time, O'Grady had been making greater attempts to get to know his teenage daughter; the Daily Mirror tabloid treated her existence as a headline scandal in autumn 1994. Critical of the media, O'Grady condemned them for solely referring to him as a drag queen; he commented that Barry Humphries, who played the character of Dame Edna Everage, was "never called a drag act because he's a heterosexual male. But I'm called one because I'm a gay man. It's homophobic and it's wrong as there is nothing remotely sexual about what I do. I dress up as a woman for financial purposes, nothing else."

In April 1996, O'Grady filmed a performance at the LWT Tower as An Evening with Lily Savage, broadcast on ITV in November. A hit, it was awarded Best Entertainment Programme at the 1997 National Television Awards. He turned down ITV's subsequent offer of a weekly show because it would air before the watershed and thus force him to drastically alter his act into a form of light entertainment. With Murphy he then established a production company, Wildflower. Returning to theatre, he performed The Lily Savage Show for a 16-week sell-out run at Blackpool's North Pier Theatre and then Lily's Christmas Cracker at the Blackpool Opera House, the latter filmed for broadcast by the BBC. At this juncture, he agreed to appear as Lily in adverts for the Ford Escort, subsequently appearing in ad campaigns for Pretty Polly tights, the soft drink Oasis, and a bingo company. Earnings from these performances allowed him to move out of his Vauxhall council flat and into a house near Tower Bridge in South London. He also purchased a flat in Saltaire.

== Television ==
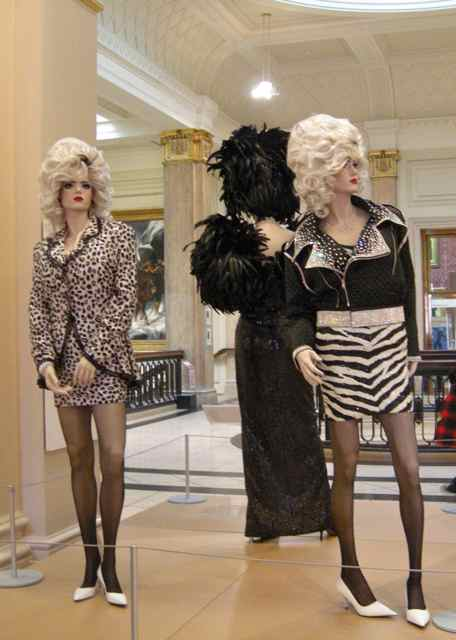
Several of O'Grady's Lily Savage costumes on display at the Walker Art Gallery, Liverpool

=== 1998–2003: Blankety Blank, travel shows, and Eyes Down ===
In 1998, the BBC produced a six-week Sunday series titled The Lily Savage Show, during which he interviewed guests like Elton John, Alan Yentob, and Anthea Turner. O'Grady found the scripted, non-spontaneous nature of the series difficult, and it was not well received. As Lily, O'Grady was invited on to other television chat shows, such as Richard and Judy; he appeared in a Christmas special of cookery show Ready, Steady, Cook. He went on an eight-week tour as Lily, before starring as Miss Hannigan in a West End revival of the musical Annie. He subsequently accompanied the show's tour of the UK, before appearing in pantomime in Birmingham.

The BBC decided to revive the quiz show Blankety Blank, previously hosted by Terry Wogan and Les Dawson. They selected O'Grady to present the show as Lily, allowing him to ad lib rather than follow a script. Screened on primetime Saturday night in 1998 and 1999, Blankety Blank proved a ratings winner, attracting an audience of 9 million. ITV then purchased it, offering O'Grady a two-year deal (2001 and 2002) for £1 million. ITV let him be more risque in his use of humour on Blankety Blank, and also commissioned a comedy series, Lily Live!. This show also proved a success, earning O'Grady nominations for both the Best Comedy Entertainment Personality and Programme at the 2000 British Comedy Awards. With increased earnings—his assets were estimated to total £4 million—in 1999 O'Grady purchased a house in Aldington, Kent from comedian Vic Reeves, decorating it in an Art Nouveau style and establishing a smallholding.

Tired of appearing as Lily, O'Grady decided to try to make a career for himself outside of drag. He appeared as himself in an advert campaign for Double Two shirt-makers, before pitching a six-part travelogue series to ITV, who agreed to part-fund it. The project resulted in Paul O'Grady's Orient, for which he travelled throughout East and Southeast Asia. Although poorly received by the tabloid press, it achieved good ratings, and ITV commissioned a second series, Paul O'Grady's America, in which he visited various U.S. cities. Again it received poor tabloid reviews. O'Grady suffered a bout of clinical depression, but recovered in time to perform alongside Cilla Black and Barbara Windsor in a burlesque rendition of "You Gotta Get a Gimmick" at the 2001 Royal Variety Performance; the televised event attracted 11.5 million viewers.

In April 2002, O'Grady had a heart attack, which doctors attributed to a combination of a congenital family heart problems with stress, heavy smoking, and caffeine. His recovery meant missing the Heritage Foundation Awards ceremony, where he was awarded television personality of the year award. Returning to work, he appeared as the Child Catcher in a twelve-week run of the musical Chitty Chitty Bang Bang at the London Palladium, receiving good reviews. He followed this with a Christmas season as the Wicked Queen in the pantomime Snow White at Manchester Opera House.

In 2003, O'Grady appeared in Celebrity Driving School, a BBC Comic Relief show in which he learned to drive, alongside Nadia Sawalha and Jade Goody. One of his tantrums on the shows was nominated for a Best Television Moment of the Year Award. Although turning down most offers to appear in a sitcom, he agreed to play the manager of a Merseyside bingo hall in the BBC series Eyes Down, commenting: "He's an evil, twisted man who hates everything that moves. Not exactly a challenge for me". Screened in the prime Friday night slot, the show was popular with viewers, if not reviewers, and was renewed for a second series in 2004. The BBC were also planning on reviving The Generation Game; O'Grady presented two pilot episodes in late 2003 but left the project, unhappy with the result. O'Grady ended 2003 in pantomime at the Bristol Hippodrome.

=== 2004–2011: The Paul O'Grady Show and Paul O'Grady Live ===
I just want the show to be like a party, a group of pals gabbing away about the first things that come into their heads. There are always enough things in life to worry and get depressed about. I want my show to take our minds off all that stuff, even if it's only for a while.

— Paul O'Grady, c. 2004

O'Grady temporarily stood in for Des O'Connor on ITV's lunchtime chat show Today with Des and Mel, enjoying the feeling of presenting live. ITV executives then offered him his own daytime chat show: The Paul O'Grady Show. There was initial press concern that O'Grady's style of adult humour would not be appropriate for a daytime slot, but ITV's controller of entertainment, Mark Wells, declared that "Paul is one of the funniest people on television – he deserves to be on it far more than he is."

The show first aired in October 2004 from 5 pm to 6 pm and saw O'Grady interviewing celebrity guests; it represented "a glorious mix of seemingly unscripted banter, chat and slapstick humour". In producing the show, O'Grady worked with many old friends, including warm-up man Andy Collins. The series was a hit, attaining between 2.5 and 2.7 million viewers daily. According to O'Grady biographer Neil Simpson, the series was "a riotous, endearingly kitsch romp with no pretensions to be anything other than pure entertainment. In some ways it was pure vaudeville[...] There were novelty acts, talking dogs, whistling goldfish, extraordinary stories. His audience laughed like drains at his anecdotes and were brought right into the heart of the show." The inclusion of his dog, Buster, on the show proved particularly popular with audiences. The show gained a devoted following, with many fans attending the screenings; often, as many as a hundred had to be turned away. Describing those attending the screenings, Simpson noted that "Groups of middle aged women dominate—but they are joined by beautiful twenty-something women with flawless make-up, flash City boys with Louis Vuitton briefcases, hip-looking students out for a good time and pensioners just wanting a laugh in the afternoon."

On or off camera it is the brilliant anecdotes about his life and the endless stream of trenchant opinions on the world in general that keep Paul's fans coming back for more.

— Biographer Neil Simpson, 2008

The show's viewing figures exceeded those of Channel 4's daytime chat show, Richard & Judy. Tabloids stoked the rivalry between the shows, calling it the "Chat Wars". O'Grady claimed that tabloids had been publishing false quotations attributed to him, describing Richard and Judy as "a lovely couple and we certainly haven't fallen out." At Christmas 2004, O'Grady starred in a pantomime, Snow White and the Seven Dwarfs, at the Victoria Palace Theatre in London's West End. After the second series of The Paul O'Grady Show was commissioned, in March 2005 it was awarded Best Daytime Programme by the Royal Television Society, and O'Grady was subsequently awarded Best Entertainment Performance at the BAFTAs. In August controversy arose after it was revealed that the staff member responsible for interviewing the show's prospective child reporters had written derogatory notes about them; O'Grady dismissed the staff member responsible and issued a public apology.

In June 2005, Murphy died of brain cancer. Prior to Murphy's death, O'Grady had promised him that his production company—now named Olga TV after one of O'Grady's dogs—would take creative control over The Paul O'Grady Show. ITV refused to allow this, and so O'Grady moved the show to Channel 4, where it was renamed The New Paul O'Grady Show. Press accused O'Grady of moving in pursuit of a higher salary; Channel 4 offered him a contract for £2 million a year, making him one of Britain's highest-paid television stars.

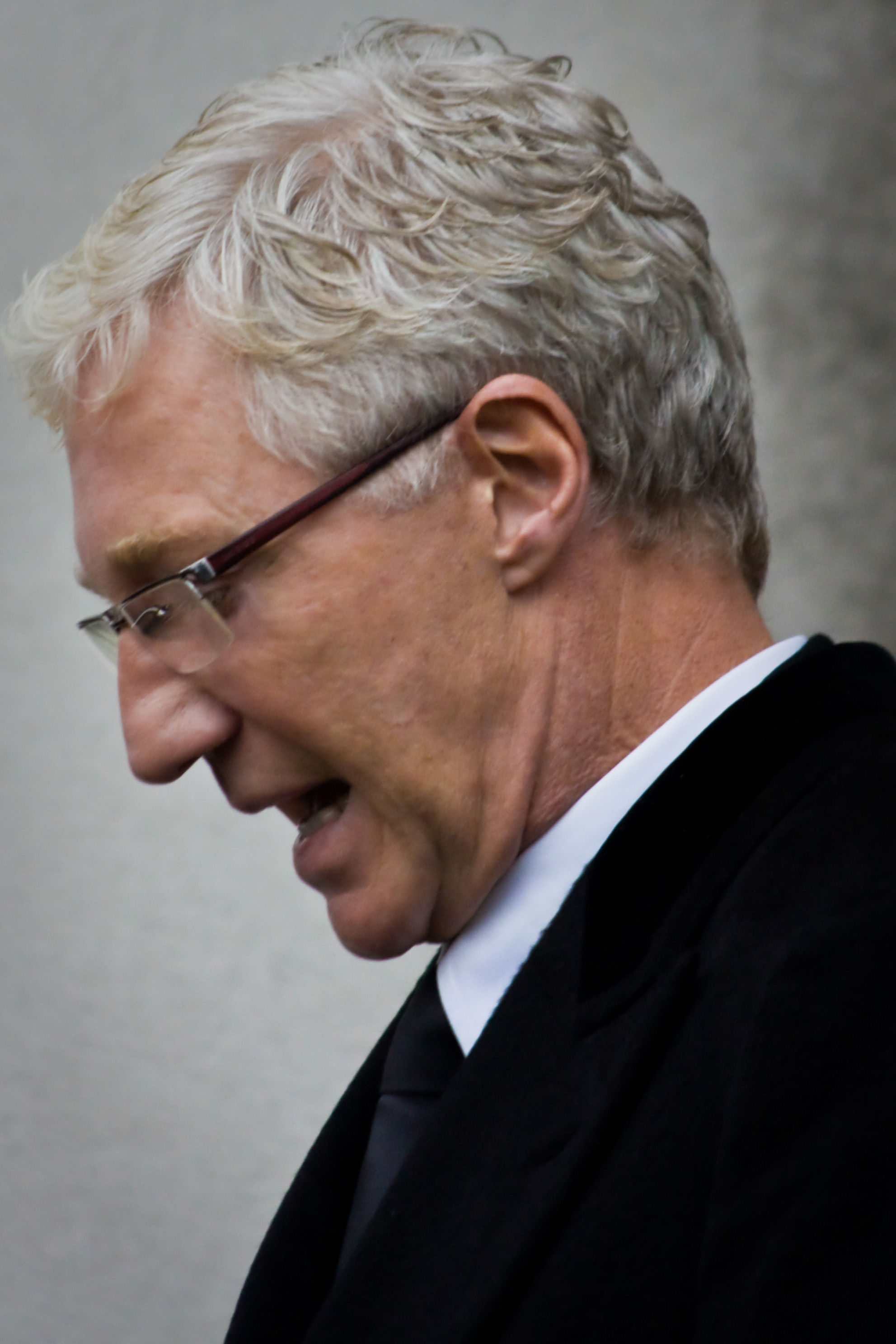
O'Grady at the 2009 funeral of actress Wendy Richard

In June 2006, O'Grady suffered a second massive heart attack, undergoing an angioplasty; he received around 7000 get-well-soon cards and letters from fans. He returned to work for the second series of The New Paul O'Grady Show in September, during which the show's viewing figures hit a new peak. To deal with his health issues, he began taking a week off mid-series, where he was replaced by guest presenters. O'Grady subsequently won the Ten Years at the Top award at the TV Quick and TV Choice awards.

The tabloids tried to re-ignite the "chat wars" by claiming a rivalry between O'Grady and other daytime television shows such as The Sharon Osbourne Show and The Brian Conley Show. Amid the later News International phone hacking scandal, police from Operation Weeting informed him that News of the World reporter Glenn Mulcaire had hacked his mobile phone. He decided not to sue. 2006 also saw the start of his relationship with future-husband André Portasio, a ballet dancer. In 2008, O'Grady had a cameo as himself in the Doctor Who episode "The Stolen Earth", and appeared in Ghosthunting with Paul O'Grady and Friends, filmed in Palermo, Sicily. 2008 also saw publication of the first volume of O'Grady's memoirs, At My Mother's Knee ... And Other Low Joints, published by Bantam. The second volume, The Devil Rides Out: The Second Coming, followed in 2010.

After budget talks broke down with Channel 4, O'Grady ended The New Paul O'Grady Show. In October 2009, O'Grady agreed to an £8 million deal with ITV to host a Friday prime-time chat-show, Paul O'Grady Live. The first series aired from September to November 2010. In October, O'Grady attracted media attention after calling the Conservative–Liberal Democrat coalition government "bastards" on his show for mass cuts to social services. He also voiced his support for student protesters who had occupied and vandalised the Conservative Party headquarters. Ofcom received several complaints over the incident. Paul O'Grady Live was picked up for a second series from April to July 2011, and included a special devoted to American pop star Lady Gaga. In October, ITV axed Paul O'Grady Live. O'Grady stated that ITV had asked him to return for a third series, but that he had refused, claiming that he had had enough of the chat show format, and that he was fed up with the "interference" from the show's producers. That month, he also performed in Drama at Inish at the Finborough Theatre in Earl's Court.

=== 2012–2023: Animal shows, Blind Date, and final works ===
2012 saw the launch of ITV documentary series Paul O'Grady: For the Love of Dogs, covering life at Battersea Dogs and Cats Home in south London. O'Grady commented that he had wanted to do such a show for years and that he took to it with an "enthusiasm that surprised everyone except me". Although scheduled to initially film at the centre for six days, he stayed as a volunteer for six months. At the end of the first series, O'Grady was invited to become an ambassador for the centre, and a bronze statue of his late dog, Buster, was erected on a plinth at the centre. He also adopted a dog from the home; a Jack Russell–Chihuahua cross named Eddy. Through the series he developed a friendship with actor Tom Hardy, who appeared in one episode.

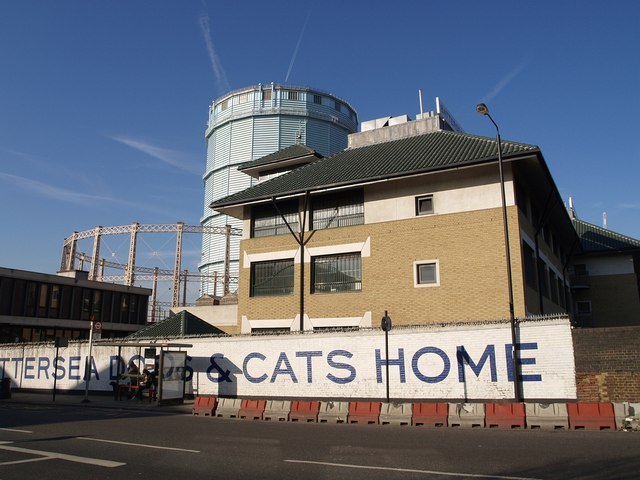
Through his series For the Love of Dogs, O'Grady built links with the Battersea Dogs and Cats Home in South London, becoming an ambassador for the charity.

In April 2012, O'Grady appeared on The One and Only Des O'Connor, a one-off special for ITV which looked back on the life of Des O'Connor. In October 2012, the third volume of his memoirs, Still Standing: The Savage Years, was released. In 2012, O'Grady also revived his Lily Savage character for a cameo in Paul O'Grady's Little Cracker, a Christmas short story. He later expressed criticism of the show RuPaul's Drag Race and the contemporary drag performers on it, stating: "It's all about shading and contouring your face now and being like supermodels [...] This new brigade who just parade around going, sashay, shantay—that's not drag to me", lacking the comedic element common to drag queens of his generation.

In July 2013, O'Grady narrated the ITV documentary Me and My Guide Dog following the work of Guide Dogs. In April 2013, O'Grady presented a documentary about burlesque performer Gypsy Rose Lee as part of ITV's Perspectives series. That month, he also presented ITV's British Animal Honours award ceremony.

In 2013, ITV revived The Paul O'Grady Show. In November, O'Grady suffered an angina attack and underwent further heart surgery.

In 2013, O'Grady guest starred as cancer patient Tim Connor in three episodes of the BBC medical drama Holby City. On 31 October 2013, O'Grady recorded a non-broadcast pilot for a BBC One sitcom called Led Astray, starring alongside Cilla Black. The show was not commissioned for a full series due to the pair's busy schedules. In 2013, O'Grady presented two-part BBC documentary series Paul O'Grady's Working Britain, which was nominated for a National Television Award in January 2014. On 16 October 2013, O'Grady presented The One and Only Cilla Black, a 90-minute ITV special celebrating Cilla Black's 50 years in show business. The show was later repeated shortly after Cilla Black's death in August 2015, with O'Grady presenting a short tribute to her to introduce the show.

The first series of Paul O'Grady's Animal Orphans screened in 2014, with O'Grady travelling to see wildlife in Africa; a second series followed in 2015 and a third in 2016. The first series averaged 3.29 million viewers while the second averaged 2.75 million. In 2014, he appeared in a Gogglebox special for Stand Up to Cancer. In December 2014, O'Grady appeared in ITV's documentary Rita & Me celebrating Barbara Knox's fifty years as the character Rita Tanner in Coronation Street.

In September 2015, O'Grady's fourth book Open the Cage, Murphy!: Further Savage Adventures was released. In 2015, O'Grady presented Bob Monkhouse: The Million Joke Man, a three-part factual series for Gold, exploring the life of comedian and presenter Bob Monkhouse. In December 2015, O'Grady appeared in Our Cilla, a one-off programme about the life of Cilla Black. 2016 saw O'Grady present Paul O'Grady: The Sally Army & Me, a documentary series on The Salvation Army for BBC One. That year, he also presented a Channel 4 documentary, Paul O'Grady's 100 Years of Movie Musicals, and another for ITV, Paul O'Grady's Favourite Fairy Tales. That same evening he appeared on ITV in Hilda Ogden's Last Ta-ra, which was a tribute to the late Coronation Street actress Jean Alexander.

In August 2017, O'Grady married Portasio in a ceremony at London's Goring Hotel, although the pair continued to live separately. That year also saw the screening of two-part ITV series Paul O'Grady: For the Love of Animals – India, and the three-part Channel 4 series Paul O'Grady's Hollywood, as well as a Channel 5 documentary about his life, The Paul O'Grady Story. It also saw the publication of O'Grady's fifth book, Paul O'Grady's Country Life. In 2017, Channel 5 revived the game show Blind Date with O'Grady as its presenter. The first series was watched by an average of 1.5 million viewers. A Christmas episode aired on 23 December 2017, before the second series aired from 30 December 2017. A third series was filmed in February 2018.

In 2020, O'Grady presented the six-part ITV series Paul O'Grady's Great British Escape, in which he visited sites across Kent. In September 2021, he began hosting Paul O'Grady's Saturday Night Line-Up.

In May 2023, O'Grady appeared alongside Paul Hollywood, King Charles and Queen Camilla, Sister Sister and Ricky Tomlinson in a pre-recorded segment for the opening of the first semi-final of the Eurovision Song Contest 2023, which was hosted in Liverpool. This was O'Grady's final television work before his death.

A final series of For The Love of Dogs that O'Grady recorded in summer 2022 aired from April to September 2023 on ITV, and on 30 January 2024, it was announced that the show would continue with a new presenter, Alison Hammond. Plus, a new 2 part documentary series for ITV, Paul O'Grady's Great Elephant Adventure, that O'Grady also filmed in 2022, aired on 31 March and 7 April 2024.

== Radio ==
In 2008 and 2009, O'Grady occasionally sat in for Elaine Paige on her BBC Radio 2 show Elaine Paige on Sunday. From April 2009, O'Grady presented his own two-hour long programme on BBC Radio 2 called Paul O'Grady on the Wireless which was broadcast on Sundays from 5 pm to 7 pm.

O'Grady was a guest on Kate Thornton's Paper Cuts in 2015. In September 2017, O'Grady presented a two-part documentary for BBC Radio 2 called The Story of the Light. The show saw O'Grady celebrate the 50th anniversary of Radio 2 by looking back at the BBC Light Programme that the channel replaced.

In August 2022, it was announced that O'Grady was resigning from BBC Radio 2 due to his unhappiness with having to share his slot with Rob Beckett. His final show aired that same month. On 21 November 2022, it was announced that O'Grady would join Boom Radio to present a show on Christmas Day, similar to the festive show he presented for Radio 2. Prior to his death, O'Grady had been due to present another special show on Easter Sunday before joining the station permanently in May 2023.

== Charity work ==
O'Grady supported philanthropic causes for carers. From 2008 onwards, he was an ambassador for Save the Children.

In 2012, O'Grady became an ambassador for Battersea Dogs and Cats Home following his series For the Love of Dogs, which was filmed in the home. In 2013, he took part in the Pedigree Feeding Brighter Futures campaign with Amanda Holden, which aimed to give a million meals to rescue dogs nationwide.

In 2014, O'Grady co-starred in a Dementia Friends TV advertisement campaign to raise awareness about the disease.

In October 2015, following his work on Animal Orphans, O'Grady became a patron of Orangutan Appeal UK.

In September 2016, O'Grady was recognised for his work with animals when he won the award for Outstanding Contribution to Animal Welfare at the RSPCA's Animal Hero Awards. As an unofficial ambassador for the county of Kent (where he lived for 20 years) and which he readily promoted (including an ITV series) he accepted the unpaid position of Deputy Lieutenant of Kent in 2022.

== Personal life ==
In 1974, with his friend Diane Jansen, O'Grady had a daughter. From 1977 to 2005, he was in a marriage of convenience with a Portuguese woman, Teresa Fernandes, although he was not in an active relationship with her.

We used to fight like cat and dog. We were two alpha males trying to be top dog. He was a tricky bastard and I can be tricky too. We'd have real punch-ups. But I'd tell him everything. Suddenly, I was totally on my own. That's when I said, "Lily's going." Because he's always been here with Lily. I thought "I can't do it any more." So she sort of died with him.

— Paul O'Grady on the death of Brendan Murphy, 2012

His long-term lover and business partner was Brendan Frank Murphy (b. 4 March 1956; d. 9 June 2005). In the fourth volume of his biography, he noted that he has "always had a penchant for the bad boys". In 2017 he married André Portasio.

Known to many friends as "Lily" or "Lil", O'Grady was known for having had many high-profile and celebrity friends, including politician Mo Mowlam, actresses Amanda Mealing and Barbara Windsor, comedian Brenda Gilhooly and singer and television presenter Cilla Black.

O'Grady divided his time between his Central London flat and his rural Kentish farmhouse, where he grew organic fruit and vegetables and a variety of herbs, having a keen interest in herbal medicine. A lifelong animal lover, as a child O'Grady kept rabbits, hamsters, guinea pigs, mice, a ferret and a rat as pets; he commented that his mother thought him "a bit weird" as a result. At his farm, he owned sheep, pigs, goats, donkeys, ducks, chickens, geese, ferrets, bats, mice and dogs.

Two of O'Grady's pet dogs became well known to the British public through appearances on The Paul O'Grady Show. The first was a rescue dog, Buster Elvis Savage, a Shih Tzu/Bichon Frisé cross. Buster was euthanised in November 2009 as a result of his cancer. O'Grady dedicated the second volume of his autobiography to Buster, describing him as "The greatest canine star since Lassie". A second dog, the Cairn Terrier Olga, also attracted attention. In 2013, it was revealed that she was undergoing chemotherapy due to cancer. Olga was euthanised in April 2018 after suffering from kidney failure.

In an interview with the Daily Mirror in 2006, O'Grady admitted that smoking forty cigarettes a day for several decades had contributed to two heart attacks.

In 2013, O'Grady expressed his support for the Labour Party, championing Labour leader Ed Miliband as a better candidate for UK Prime Minister than Conservative incumbent David Cameron. He lambasted the Cameron–Clegg coalition government then in power, describing them as "absolutely disgusting. They have no idea what the common working man and woman are doing. They are not in touch with the working-classes. They have led privileged lives – they've had public schools and have never been on the shop floor." He also praised Miliband's successor, Jeremy Corbyn.

In 2015, he told a reporter that despite his wealth, he still felt "very much" working-class; "I know that probably sounds strange. Mentally, I still am. I'm still thinking, have I got the rent for Friday?" Raised as a Roman Catholic, in his autobiography he related having "grown out of Catholicism" after his mother's death, but had "always been interested in alternative religions", citing a particular interest in Wicca. He also reported seeing unexplained lights over his Kent home, considering the possibility that he was being observed by extraterrestrials.

== Death ==
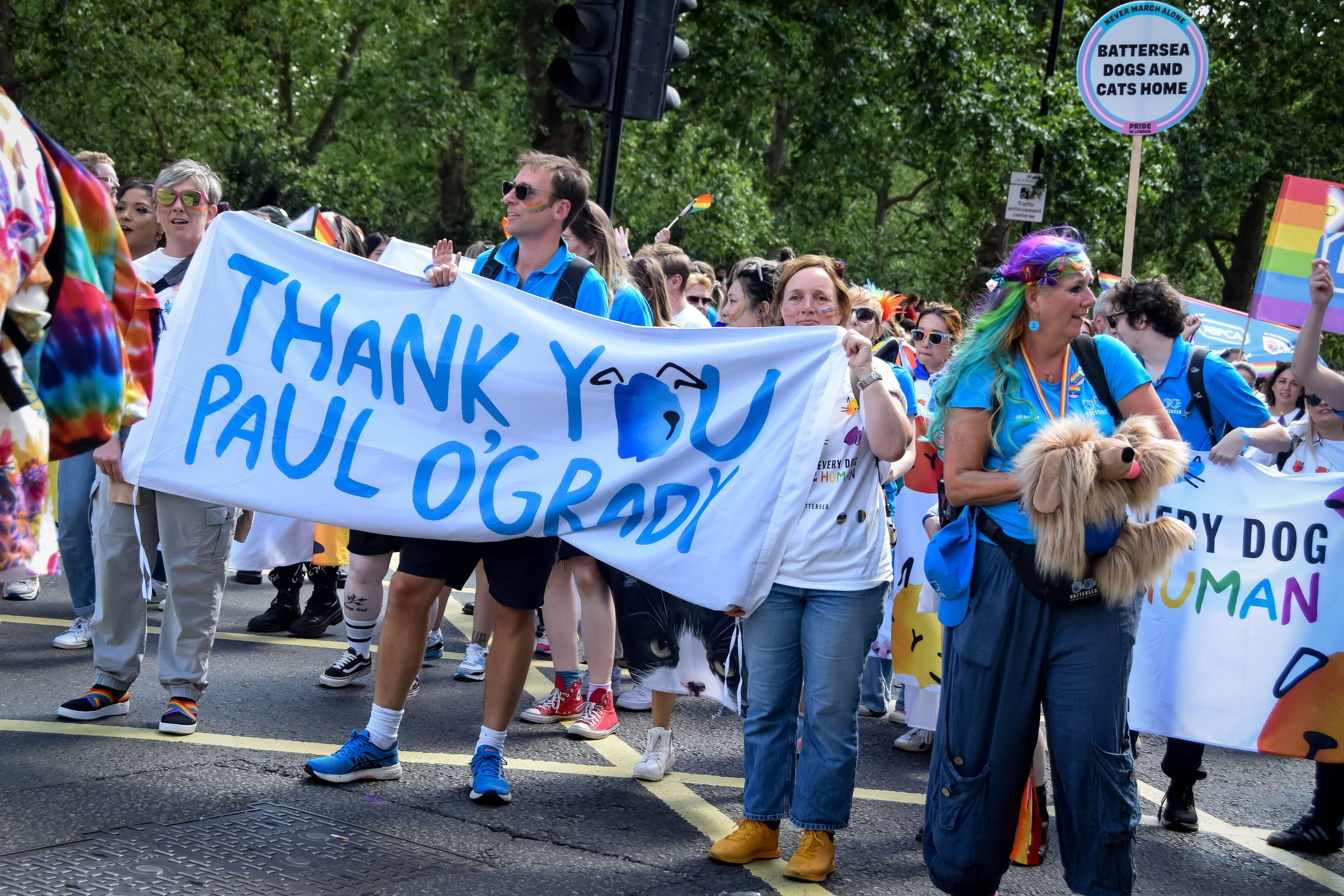
Battersea Dogs and Cats Home thank O'Grady at Pride in London 2023

O'Grady died at his home in Kent on 28 March 2023, aged 67, from sudden cardiac arrhythmia. He had previously had three heart attacks, in 2002, 2006 and 2014. His death was announced by his husband, André Portasio, and tributes poured in from global figures and celebrities, including from Queen Camilla, television presenter Lorraine Kelly and LGBT rights campaigner Peter Tatchell. O'Grady has been hailed by many as a national treasure.

O'Grady's final performance was as Miss Hannigan in Annie at the Edinburgh Playhouse just days before his death. His funeral was held at the Church of St Rumwold, Bonnington, Kent, on 20 April 2023; after the service he was buried there, next to his late partner Brendan Murphy.

== Legacy ==
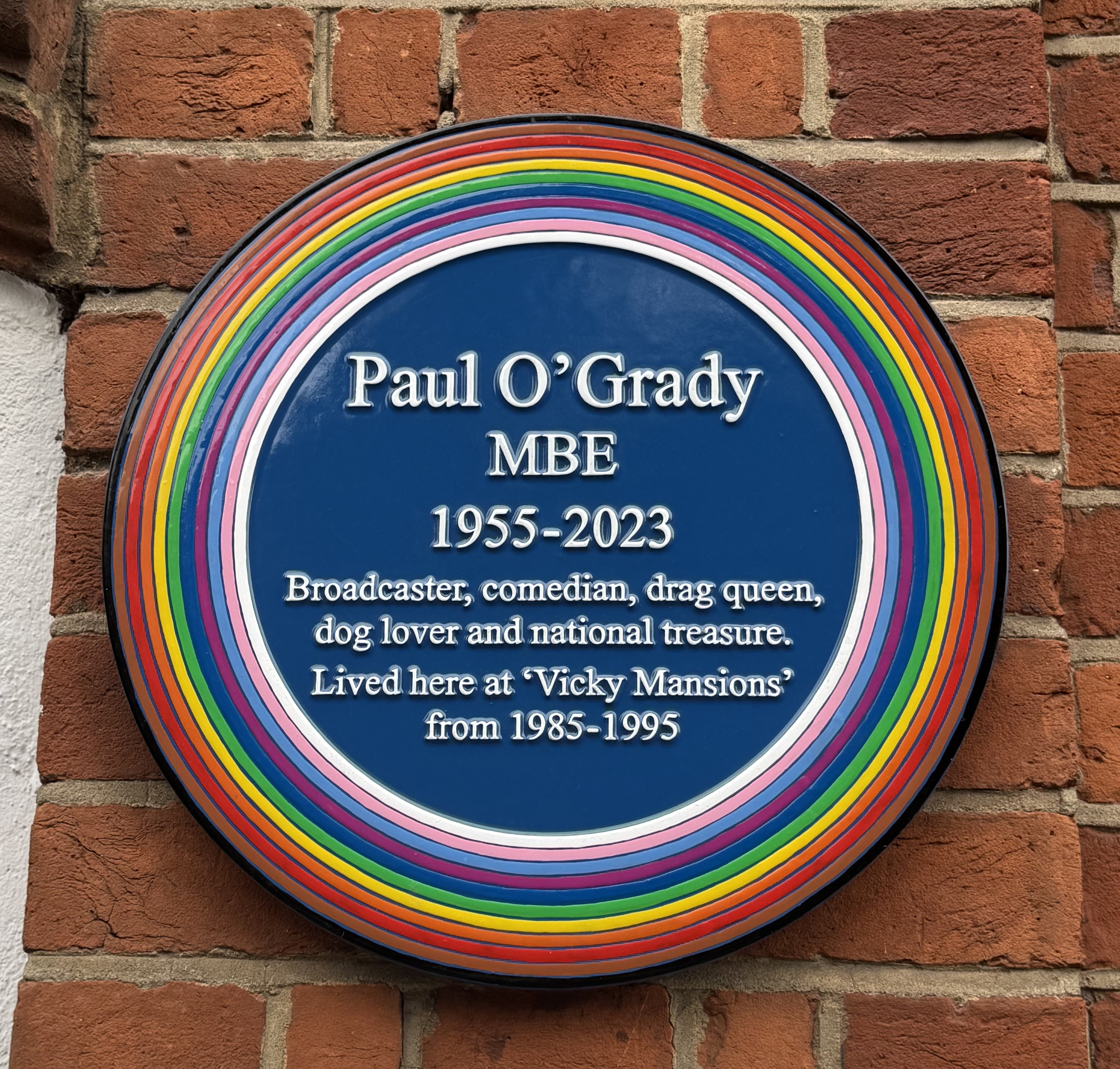
Rainbow Plaque commemorating O'Grady at Victoria Mansions, South Lambeth Road, Vauxhall, London, in 2026

A play based on O'Grady's life called Savage written by Jonathan Harvey will open at the Curve, Leicester in February 2027, prior to a UK tour and West End run. It will be directed by Curve artistic director Nikolai Foster and will star Danny Beard as O'Grady/Lily Savage. The play was in development with O'Grady with him receiving a first draft of the script a few months before passing. It has since been in development with his husband, André Portasio.

== Filmography ==
| Year(s) | Title | Role | Notes |
|---|---|---|---|
| 1988–1990 | The Bill | Roxanne | As Paul Savage |
| 1991 | Chimera | Donaldson | As Paul Savage |
| 1992 | The New Statesman | Marlene Dietrich | |
| 1993 | In the Name of the Father | Prisoner | |
| 1994 | Top of the Pops | Guest presenter | As Lily Savage |
| 1994 | Eurotrash | Segment presenter | As Lily Savage |
| 1995–1996 | The Big Breakfast | Presenter | As Lily Savage |
| 1996 | An Evening with Lily Savage | Presenter | As Lily Savage |
| 1997 | The Lily Savage Show | Presenter | As Lily Savage |
| 1997–2002 | Blankety Blank | Presenter | As Lily Savage |
| 1999 | Love Bites with Lily Savage | Presenter | |
| 2000 | Paul O'Grady's Orient | Presenter | |
| 2000–2001 | Lily Live! | Presenter | As Lily Savage |
| 2001 | Paul O'Grady's America | Presenter | |
| 2002–2003 | Outtake TV | Presenter | |
| 2003 | Today with Des and Mel | Guest presenter | |
| 2003–2004 | Eyes Down | Ray Temple | Main role |
| 2004–2005 | The British Soap Awards | Presenter | |
| 2004–2009, 2013–2015 | The Paul O'Grady Show | Presenter | |
| 2005 | Comic Aid | Presenter (as Lily Savage) | |
| 2005, 2009 | Ant & Dec's Saturday Night Takeaway | Guest announcer | 2 episodes |
| 2008 | Doctor Who | Himself, cameo | Episode: "The Stolen Earth" |
| 2010 | Coronation Street: The Big 50 | Presenter | |
| 2010–2011 | Paul O'Grady Live | Presenter | |
| 2012–2023 | Paul O'Grady: For the Love of Dogs | Presenter | |
| 2013 | The British Animal Honours | Presenter | |
| 2013 | Me and My Guide Dog | Narrator | |
| 2013 | Paul O'Grady's Working Britain | Presenter | |
| 2013 | Perspectives: Gypsy Rose Lee – The Queen of Burlesque | Presenter | |
| 2013 | Holby City | Tim Connor | 3 episodes |
| 2013 | The One and Only Cilla Black | Presenter | |
| 2014 | Gogglebox | Himself, guest | 1 episode |
| 2014–2016 | Paul O'Grady's Animal Orphans | Presenter | |
| 2015 | Bob Monkhouse: The Million Joke Man | Presenter | |
| 2016 | Paul O'Grady: The Sally Army & Me | Presenter | |
| 2016 | Paul O'Grady's 100 Years of Movie Musicals | Presenter | |
| 2016 | Paul O'Grady's Favourite Fairy Tales | Presenter | |
| 2017 | Paul O'Grady: For the Love of Animals – India | Presenter | |
| 2017 | Paul O'Grady's Hollywood | Presenter | |
| 2017–2019 | Blind Date | Presenter | 33 episodes |
| 2018 | Paul O'Grady: For the Love of Dogs: India | Presenter | |
| 2018 | The NHS Heroes Awards | Presenter | |
| 2018–2019 | Paul O'Grady's Little Heroes | Presenter | |
| 2020 | Paul O'Grady's Great British Escape | Presenter | |
| 2021 | The Madame Blanc Mysteries | David | |
| 2021 | Paul O'Grady's Saturday Night Line Up | Presenter | |
| 2023 | For the Love of Paul O'Grady | Himself | ITV tribute show, archival footage |
| 2023 | Eurovision Song Contest 2023 | Himself | Cameo and posthumous appearance in opening of first semi-final |
| 2024 | Paul O'Grady's Great Elephant Adventure | Himself | Two-part documentary; O'Grady's final television appearance |

== Recognitions ==
=== Awards and nominations ===
| Year | Award | | Work | Result | Notes |
|---|---|---|---|---|---|
| 1996 | National Television Awards | Most Popular Entertainment Performance | An Evening with Lily Savage | Nominated | |
| 1997 | National Television Awards | Most Popular Entertainment Performance | An Evening with Lily Savage | Nominated | |
| 1998 | National Television Awards | Most Popular Entertainment Performance | Blankety Blank | Nominated | |
| 1999 | National Television Awards | Most Popular Entertainment Performance | Blankety Blank | Won | |
| 2000 | British Comedy Awards | Best Comedy Entertainment Personality | Lily Live! | Nominated | |
| 2002 | National Television Awards | Most Popular Entertainment Presenter | The Paul O'Grady Show | Nominated | |
| 2005 | British Academy Television Awards | Best Entertainment Performance | The Paul O'Grady Show | Won | |
| 2005 | British Comedy Awards | Best Comedy Entertainment Personality | The Paul O'Grady Show | Won | |
| 2005 | National Television Awards | Most Popular Entertainment Presenter | The Paul O'Grady Show | Nominated | |
| 2005 | National Television Awards | Most Popular Daytime Programme | The Paul O'Grady Show | Won | |
| 2006 | National Television Awards | Most Popular Entertainment Presenter | —N/a | Nominated | |
| 2007 | National Television Awards | Most Popular Entertainment Presenter | —N/a | Nominated | |
| 2008 | National Television Awards | Most Popular Entertainment Presenter | —N/a | Nominated | |
| 2008 | National Television Awards | Most Popular Entertainment Programme | The Paul O'Grady Show | Won | |
| 2010 | National Television Awards | Most Popular Entertainment Programme | The Paul O'Grady Show | Nominated | |
| 2015 | National Television Awards | Most Popular Chat Show Host | The Paul O'Grady Show | Nominated | |
| 2018 | National Television Awards | Special Recognition Award | Paul O'Grady: For the Love of Dogs | Won | |

=== Honorary fellowship and doctorate ===
In 2005, Liverpool John Moores University awarded O'Grady an honorary fellowship for services to entertainment, and in 2010, he received an honorary Doctor of Arts degree from De Montfort University in Leicester in recognition of his outstanding contribution to television, radio and the stage.

=== Other ===
In September 2016, O'Grady was recognised for his work with animals when he won the award for Outstanding Contribution to Animal Welfare at the RSPCA's Animal Hero Awards.

In October 2023, Battersea Dogs & Cats Home announced that they would be naming a new veterinary hospital after O'Grady, and a "tribute fund" set up in his honour would go towards "life-saving and transformative medical procedures" for dogs and cats which need specialist care and treatment.

In March 2026, it was announced an exhibition featuring items from Paul's archive would be held in his hometown of Birkenhead at the Williamson Art Gallery from 4 December 2026 into 2027.

| Preceded by Les Dawson | Host of Blankety Blank; 1997–2002 (as Lily Savage) | Succeeded by David Walliams |
