= 23rd National Television Awards =

British awards ceremony in 2018

- Date: 23 January 2018
- Location: The O2 Arena, London
- Country: United Kingdom
- Presented by: Dermot O'Leary; Georgia Toffolo (backstage)
- Website: http://www.nationaltvawards.com/

Television/radio coverage
- Network: ITV

The 23rd National Television Awards were held at The O2 Arena on 23 January 2018. The awards were hosted by Dermot O'Leary. This is the first time (since 2005) that National Television Awards had aired on a Tuesday, not Wednesday. Georgia Toffolo replaced Scarlett Moffatt as backstage presenter.

== Performances ==
- Rak-Su
- Seal

== Awards ==
Category Presenter(s)	Winner	Nominated
"Challenge Show"; Presented by Ioan Gruffudd	I'm a Celebrity... Get Me Out of Here! (ITV)	Love Island (ITV2); MasterChef (BBC One); The Great British Bake Off (Channel 4)
"Crime Drama"; Presented by Don Johnson	Broadchurch (ITV)	Little Boy Blue (ITV); Line of Duty (BBC One); Sherlock (BBC One)
"Talent Show"; Presented by Freddie Flintoff	Strictly Come Dancing (BBC One)	The Voice UK (ITV); The X Factor (ITV); Britain's Got Talent (ITV)
"Drama"; Presented by Charlie Heaton and Natalia Dyer	Doctor Foster (BBC One)	Liar (ITV); Casualty (BBC One); Call the Midwife (BBC One); Game of Thrones (Sky Atlantic/HBO)
"TV Presenter"; Presented by Shirley Ballas	Ant & Dec	Phillip Schofield; Holly Willoughby; Bradley Walsh
"Factual Entertainment"; Presented by Suranne Jones	Gogglebox (Channel 4)	Paul O'Grady: For the Love of Dogs (ITV); Diana, Our Mother: Her Life and Legacy (ITV); Ambulance (BBC One)
"Drama Performance"; Presented by Jodie Whittaker	Suranne Jones (Gemma Foster, Doctor Foster - BBC One)	David Tennant (Alec Hardy, Broadchurch - ITV); Sheridan Smith (Julie Bushby, The Moorside - BBC One); Jenna Coleman (Queen Victoria, Victoria - ITV); Tom Hardy (James Delaney, Taboo - BBC One)
"The Bruce Forsyth Entertainment Award"; Presented by Wilnelia Merced	Ant & Dec's Saturday Night Takeaway (ITV)	Celebrity Juice (ITV2); All Round to Mrs. Brown's (BBC One); The Graham Norton Show (BBC One)
"Serial Drama"; Presented by Julie Walters	Emmerdale (ITV)	Coronation Street (ITV); EastEnders (BBC One); Hollyoaks (Channel 4)
"Serial Drama Performance"; Presented by Tamzin Outhwaite	Lucy Fallon (Bethany Platt, Coronation Street - ITV)	Lacey Turner (Stacey Fowler, EastEnders - BBC One); Barbara Knox (Rita Tanner, Coronation Street - ITV); Danny Miller (Aaron Dingle, Emmerdale - ITV)
"Comedy"; Presented by Romesh Ranganathan	Peter Kay's Car Share (BBC One)	The Big Bang Theory (E4/CBS); Still Open All Hours (BBC One); Benidorm (ITV)
"Newcomer"	Danny Walters (Keanu Taylor, EastEnders - BBC One)	Rob Mallard (Daniel Osbourne, Coronation Street - ITV); Nathan Morris (Milo Entwistle, Hollyoaks - Channel 4); Ned Porteous (Joe Tate, Emmerdale - ITV)
"Daytime"	This Morning (ITV)	The Chase (ITV); Loose Women (ITV); The Jeremy Kyle Show (ITV)
"TV Judge"; Presented by Rob Beckett & Geri Halliwell	David Walliams (Britain's Got Talent - ITV)	Paul Hollywood (The Great British Bake Off - Channel 4) will.i.am (The Voice UK & The Voice Kids - ITV); Simon Cowell (Britain's Got Talent & The X Factor - ITV)
"TV Moment"; Presented by Dermot O'Leary	Ariana Grande, Coldplay and the city of Manchester sing "Don't Look Back in Anger" at the One Love Manchester benefit concert	
"Impact Award"; Presented by Dermot O'Leary	Blue Planet II	
"Special Recognition"; Presented by Dermot O'Leary	Paul O'Grady: For the Love of Dogs	

== Programmes with multiple nominations ==
Programmes that received multiple nominations
Nominations	Programme
4	Britain's Got Talent
4	Coronation Street
3	EastEnders
3	Emmerdale
3	This Morning
2	Ant & Dec's Saturday Night Takeaway
2	Broadchurch
2	The Chase
2	Doctor Foster
2	The Great British Bake Off
2	Hollyoaks
2	I'm a Celebrity... Get Me Out of Here!
2	The Voice UK
2	The X Factor

Networks that received multiple nominations
Nominations	Network
27	ITV
18	BBC One
5	Channel 4
2	ITV2
