= Abi Roberts =

Welsh stand-up comedian and political commentator

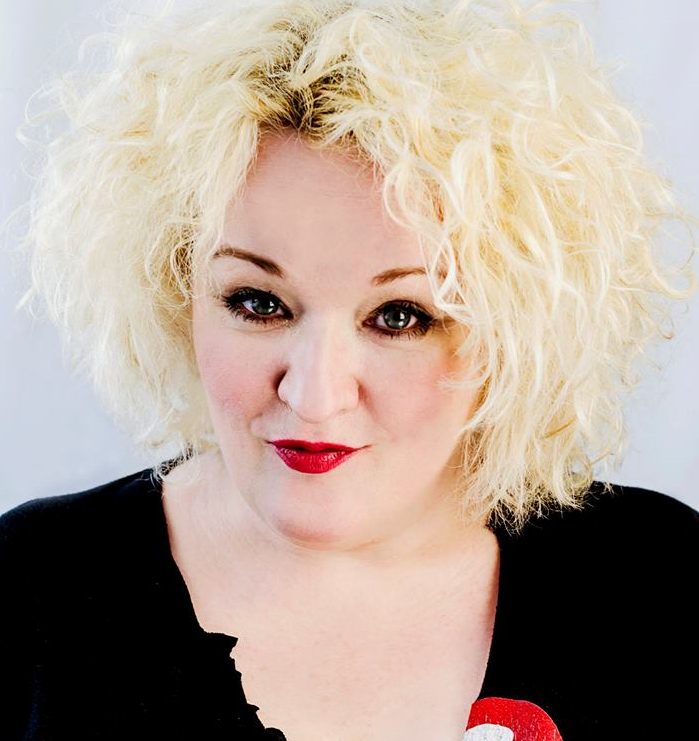
- Abi Roberts, taken 2017.
- Education: Swansea University; Bristol Old Vic Theatre School; Moscow Conservatory
- Occupation: Political commentator

Abi Roberts (born 1 June 1970) is a political commentator. She has appeared on GB News on numerous occasions.

== Early life ==
Roberts was born in Cardiff and studied Russian and Italian at Swansea University. Additionally, she also attended the Bristol Old Vic Theatre School and later the Moscow Conservatoire.

== Career ==
She has appeared in a series of comedy sketch shows on the London stage and at the Edinburgh Festival. She has appeared in several satirical comedies, such as: Newsrevue, Eve Ensler's The Vagina Monologues and Jonathan Harvey's stage show, Taking Charlie.

Roberts has been a regular on the stand-up comedy circuit's open spot clubs since 2011 and has performed across the UK and the US. She has appeared as a guest comedian on several radio stations and appeared in the films One Under and The Honeymoon for Square Cat Films and Bucketless for Sky Arts.

In February 2016, she became the first UK comedian to perform in Russia. She has made several appearances on GB News as well as Good Morning Britain.

== Views ==
In June 2021, Roberts claimed that her agent dropped her for being a trans-exclusionary radical feminist (or TERF). She is a Christian.
