= Nikolai Foster =

British playwright and theatre director

- Born: 27 January 1980 (age 46); Copenhagen, Denmark
- Occupation: Theatre director

Nikolai Foster (born 27 January 1980) is a British theatrical director and artistic director of the Curve Theatre.

== Background ==
Foster was born in Copenhagen and brought up in North Yorkshire. He trained at Drama Centre London and at Crucible Theatre in Sheffield. He has directed a wide range of touring and local productions in both the UK and across the world.

He has appeared multiple times on the Stage 100, a list of the top 100 most influential people in the UK, most recently placing joint 14th in 2026. Critics have noted Foster's ability to balance large scale commercial musical theatre with regional producing, Billy Elliot the Musical directed by Foster received strong national reviews during its post West End life and touring productions.

== Career ==
Foster has had a career directing musicals in the UK, both at Curve Theatre and touring productions.

After his second year of drama school at Drama Centre London, and at risk of being thrown out, he asked to train as a director alongside Christopher Fettes. During this he undertook work experience at Queen's Theatre, Hornchurch, where he applied for the Regional Theatre Young Director Scheme. He trained under Michael Grandage at the Crucible theatre. During this time, he began as a freelance director, continuing this for 20 years until he joined Curve Theatre as artistic director.

== Works ==
=== Professional productions ===
Foster has directed a wide range of productions, including UK Tours, and Made at Curve productions.

- A Christmas Carol (Birmingham Repertory Theatre and West Yorkshire Playhouse)
- A Chorus Line (Curve, Sadler's Wells Theatre and UK tour)
- A Streetcar Named Desire (Curve)
- Richard III (Curve)
- The Witches (Curve and UK tour)
- Breakfast at Tiffany's (Curve, UK tour and Theatre Royal Haymarket)
- Evita (Curve)
- The Wizard Of Oz (Curve, London Palladium, UK tour and Gillian Lynne Theatre)
- The Importance of Being Earnest (Birmingham Repertory Theatre and Curve)
- What the Butler Saw (Curve and Theatre Royal, Bath)
- Scrooge (Curve)
- An Officer and a Gentleman (Curve and UK tour)
- Billy Elliot The Musical (Curve)
- Grease (Curve, UK tour and Dominion Theatre)
- West Side Story (Curve)
- My Beautiful Laundrette (Curve and UK tour)
- Calamity Jane (Watermill Theatre and UK tour)
- My Fair Lady (Curve)
- The Sound of Music (Curve and Opera North)
- Annie (UK tour and Piccadilly Theatre)
- Legally Blonde (UK tour)
- Bank of Dave: The Musical (The Lowry and Curve)
- The Silence of the Lambs (Curve and UK tour)
- Kinky Boots (UK tour, Curve and London Coliseum)
- Charlie and the Chocolate Factory (Curve and London Coliseum)
- Savage (Curve and UK tour)
