= Viva Cabaret =

- Genre: Comedy
- Country of origin: United Kingdom
- Original language: English
- No. of series: 2
- No. of episodes: 13

Production
- Running time: 45–50 mins
- Production company: TV21

Original release
- Network: Channel 4
- Release: 14 April 1993 – 24 June 1994

Viva Cabaret is a late night comedy variety television show that aired on Channel 4 in the United Kingdom from 14 April 1993 to 24 June 1994.

The series was filmed in a sound stage in West London, with the set designed to resemble a cabaret club. The programme's house band included drummer Ray Weston (of Wishbone Ash) and members of Pink Floyd's touring band.

The first episode, which debuted on 14 April 1993, was hosted by Tom Jones. Subsequent hosts included Julian Clary, Mark Lamarr, Mike McShane, Jools Holland, Mark Thomas, Eartha Kitt, Paul O'Grady as Lily Savage, and Lee Evans. Competition for slots on the show was intense, with many stars of the British alternative comedy circuit hoping to make an appearance. In addition to the show's British stars, regular international guests included Americans Greg Proops and Sandra Bernhard, and Australia's Doug Anthony All Stars.

== Transmissions ==
Series	Start date	End date	Episodes
1	21 April 1993	26 May 1993	7
2	20 May 1994	24 June 1994	6
