= Cardinal Wiseman Catholic School, Birmingham =

Cardinal Wiseman Catholic School
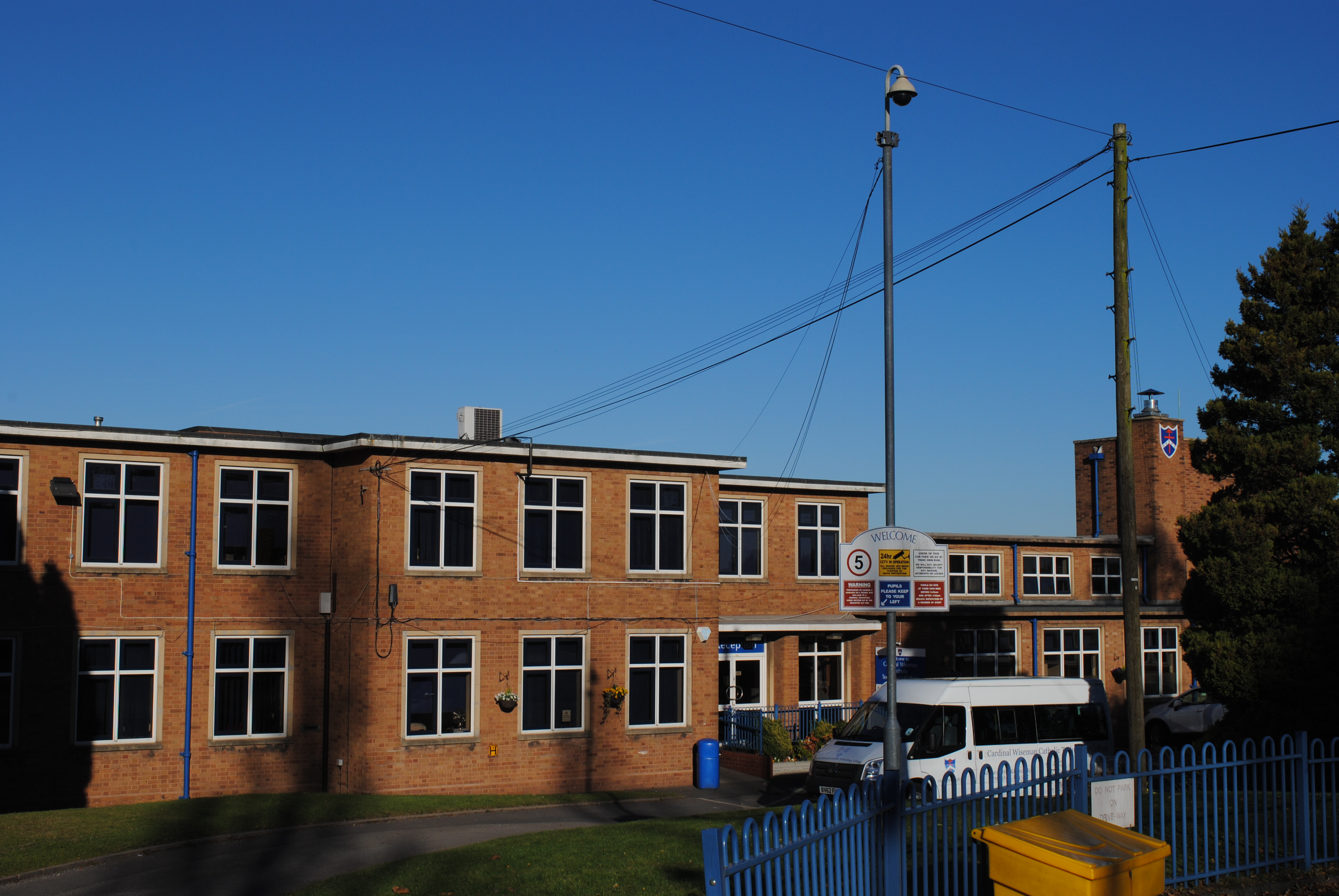
- The college in November 2016

Location
- Old Oscott Hill, Kingstanding; Birmingham, West Midlands, B44 9SR; England
- Coordinates: 52.5497°N 1.8886°W

Information
- Type: Voluntary aided school
- Motto: Mandem in Fide (Forward in Faith)
- Religious affiliation: Roman Catholic
- Local authority: Birmingham City Council
- Department for Education URN: 103539 Tables
- Ofsted: Reports
- Head teacher: Robert Swanwick
- Staff: 45+
- Gender: Co-educational
- Age: 11 to 16
- Enrolment: 650+
- Colours: White and black
- Website: http://www.cardinalwiseman.bham.sch.uk/

Cardinal Wiseman Catholic School is a non-selective comprehensive state secondary school in Kingstanding; an inner-city suburb of Birmingham, England. It is named after Cardinal Nicholas Wiseman. This school has no requirements to be able to join.

== Notable alumni ==
- Alison Hammond (b. 1975) - actor and television presenter
