= For the Love of Dogs =

- Genre: Documentary
- Presented by: Paul O'Grady (2012–2023); Alison Hammond (2024–)
- Country of origin: United Kingdom
- Original language: English
- No. of series: 12
- No. of episodes: 98 (incl. all specials)

Production
- Running time: 30 minutes (series); 60 minutes (specials)
- Production companies: MultiStory Media; Olga TV

Original release
- Network: ITV
- Release: 3 September 2012 – present

For the Love of Dogs with Alison Hammond (previously Paul O'Grady: For the Love of Dogs) is a British reality documentary television series set at Battersea Dogs & Cats Home, presented by Paul O'Grady until his death in 2023, and by Alison Hammond from 2024. Under O'Grady it won numerous awards. The show was made by MultiStory Media and premiered on ITV on 3 September 2012.

== O'Grady era ==
O'Grady commented that he had wanted to do such a show for years and that he took to it with an "enthusiasm that surprised everyone except me". Although scheduled to initially film at the Battersea Dogs and Cats Home for six days, he stayed as a volunteer for six months. At the end of the first series, O'Grady was invited to become an ambassador for Battersea Dogs and Cats Home.

Following O'Grady's death, the episode titled A Royal Special, which originally aired in December 2022, was repeated on ITV on 29 March 2023.

In October 2023, Battersea announced that they would be naming a new veterinary hospital after O'Grady, and a "tribute fund" set up in his honour would go towards "life-saving and transformative medical procedures" for dogs and cats which need specialist care and treatment.

== Format ==
Throughout the series, members of the staff talk about the dogs in their care, including head vet Shaun Opperman and head of canine welfare training Ali Taylor. Each episode showcases a few of the dogs who come to Battersea as strays or because their owners can't look after them anymore, and follows each dog's progress through the home.

== Transmissions ==
Series	Start date	End date	Episodes	Presenter
1	3 September 2012	15 October 2012	7	Paul O'Grady
2	9 May 2013	4 July 2013	8	Paul O'Grady
3	4 September 2014	20 November 2014	11	Paul O'Grady
4	8 October 2015	10 December 2015	8	Paul O'Grady
5	1 September 2016	27 October 2016	8	Paul O'Grady
6	19 October 2017	14 December 2017	8	Paul O'Grady
7	31 October 2018	19 December 2018	8	Paul O'Grady
8	23 October 2019	11 December 2019	8	Paul O'Grady
9	7 April 2021	8 December 2021	8	Paul O'Grady
10	29 December 2021	13 March 2022	10	Paul O'Grady
11	13 April 2023	28 September 2023	8	Paul O'Grady
12	16 April 2024	21 May 2024	6	Alison Hammond
13	1 April 2025	6 May 2025	6	Alison Hammond

== Episodes ==
=== Series 1 (2012) ===
Episode	Original airdate	Viewers (millions)
1	3 September 2012	3.53
2	10 September 2012	4.20
3	17 September 2012	3.97
4	24 September 2012	4.05
5	1 October 2012	4.10
6	8 October 2012	4.21
7	15 October 2012	4.43

=== Series 2 (2013) ===
Episode	Original airdate	Viewers (millions)
1	9 May 2013	5.04
2	16 May 2013	5.25
3	23 May 2013	5.08
4	6 June 2013	4.44
5	13 June 2013	4.81
6	20 June 2013	4.83
7	27 June 2013	5.23
8	4 July 2013	5.09

=== Series 3 (2014) ===
Episode	Original airdate	Viewers (millions)
1	4 September 2014	3.45
2	11 September 2014	3.42
3	18 September 2014	3.57
4	25 September 2014	4.19
5	2 October 2014	3.95
6	16 October 2014	4.10
7	23 October 2014	3.92
8	28 October 2014	4.10
9	6 November 2014	4.40
10	13 November 2014	4.11
11	20 November 2014	4.53

=== Series 4 (2015) ===
Episode	Original airdate	Viewers (millions)
1	8 October 2015	3.46
2	15 October 2015	3.84
3	29 October 2015	3.86
4	5 November 2015	3.98
5	12 November 2015	3.85
6	19 November 2015	3.89
7	26 November 2015	3.67
8	10 December 2015	4.01

=== Series 5 (2016) ===
Episode	Original airdate	Viewers (viewers)
1	1 September 2016	4.51
2	8 September 2016	4.12
3	15 September 2016	4.28
4	22 September 2016	4.67
5	6 October 2016	4.45
6	13 October 2016	4.82
7	20 October 2016	4.98
8	27 October 2016	4.66

=== Series 6 (2017) ===
Episode	Original airdate	Viewers (millions)
1	19 October 2017	4.59
2	26 October 2017	4.60
3	2 November 2017	4.52
4	9 November 2017	4.96
5	16 November 2017	4.24
6	30 November 2017	4.75
7	7 December 2017	4.10
8	14 December 2017	4.70

=== Series 7 (2018) ===
Episode	Original airdate	Viewers (millions)
1	31 October 2018	5.12
2	7 November 2018	5.15
3	14 November 2018	5.09
4	21 November 2018	—N/a
5	28 November 2018	—N/a
6	5 December 2018	—N/a
7	12 December 2018	—N/a
8	19 December 2018	5.12

=== Series 8 (2019) ===
Episode	Original airdate	Viewers (millions)
1	23 October 2019	—N/a
2	30 October 2019	4.73
3	6 November 2019	5.14
4	13 November 2019	4.87
5	20 November 2019	—N/a
6	27 November 2019	—N/a
7	4 December 2019	—N/a
8	18 December 2019	4.90

=== Series 9 (2021) ===
Episode	Original airdate	Viewers (millions)
1	7 April 2021	4.63
2	14 April 2021	4.21
3	21 April 2021	4.24
4	28 April 2021	3.96
5	5 May 2021	4.20
6	24 November 2021	3.66
7	1 December 2021	—N/a
8	8 December 2021	3.91

=== Series 10 (2021–22) ===
Episode	Original airdate	Viewers (millions)
1	29 December 2021	
2	5 January 2022	
3	12 January 2022	
4	19 January 2022	
5	26 January 2022	
6	2 February 2022	
7	9 February 2022	
8	16 February 2022	
9	23 February 2022	
10	13 March 2022	

=== Series 11 (2023) ===
Episode	Original airdate	Viewers (millions)
1	13 April 2023	
2	20 April 2023	
3	27 April 2023	
4	4 May 2023	
5	7 September 2023	
6	14 September 2023	
7	21 September 2023	
8	28 September 2023	

=== Series 12 (2024) ===
Episode	Original airdate	Viewers (millions)
1	16 April 2024	
2	23 April 2024	
3	30 April 2024	
4	7 May 2024	
5	14 May 2024	
6	21 May 2024	

=== Specials ===
Title	Original airdate	Viewers (millions)
Christmas 2012	25 December 2012	4.02
Christmas 2013	25 December 2013	4.28
Christmas 2014	25 December 2014	2.98
Christmas 2015	25 December 2015	3.12
Christmas 2016	25 December 2016	3.97
Best in Show	3 January 2017	3.42
Christmas 2017	25 December 2017	4.25
For the Love of Dogs – India	26 April 2018	3.49
For the Love of Dogs – India	3 May 2018	3.23
For the Love of Dogs – India	10 May 2018	3.45
For the Love of Dogs – India	17 May 2018	3.27
Christmas 2018	25 December 2018	3.85
Christmas 2019	26 December 2019	—N/a
Back in Business	15 July 2020	3.82
What Happened Next	29 July 2020	3.38
Christmas 2021	25 December 2021	—N/a
A Royal Special	19 December 2022	3.28

== Awards ==
For the Love of Dogs has won a number of awards. The show has won two consecutive National Television Awards for 'Most Popular Factual Entertainment Programme' in 2013 and 2014. In 2014, it was nominated for a third National Television Award, this time under the category 'Most Popular Factual Programme', but lost out to Gogglebox. It won again in 2019 after beating Gogglebox for the first time in five years, and then in 2023.

The show was also nominated for a BAFTA for 'Best Features Programme' in 2013.

Year	Group	Award	Result	References
2013	National Television Awards	Most Popular Factual Entertainment Programme	Won	
2013	Broadcasting Press Guild Awards	Best Factual Entertainment	Nominated	
2013	BAFTA Television Awards	Best Features Programme	Nominated	
2013	TV Choice Awards	Best Factual Entertainment & Lifestyle Show	Won	
2013	TV Times Awards	Best Factual Entertainment & Lifestyle Show	Won	
2014	National Television Awards	Most Popular Factual Entertainment Programme	Won	
2014	Broadcast Awards	Best Popular Factual Programme	Nominated	
2014	TRIC Awards	Factual Programme	Won	
2014	TV Times Awards	Favourite Factual Show	Won	
2015	National Television Awards	Most Popular Factual Programme	Nominated	
2015	TRIC Awards	Factual Programme	Nominated	
2015	TV Choice Awards	Best Factual Entertainment Show	Nominated	
2015	TV Times Awards	Favourite Factual Show	Won	
2016	National Television Awards	Factual Entertainment	Nominated	
2016	TRIC Awards	Factual Programme	Nominated	
2016	TV Choice Awards	Best Factual Show	Won	
2016	TV Times Awards	Favourite Factual Show	Won	
2017	National Television Awards	Factual Entertainment	Nominated	
2017	TV Choice Awards	Best Factual Show	Won	
2017	TV Times Awards	Favourite Factual Show	Won	
2018	National Television Awards	Factual Entertainment	Nominated	
2018	National Television Awards	Special Recognition	Won	
2019	National Television Awards	Factual Entertainment	Won	
2020	National Television Awards	Factual	Nominated	
2021	TV Choice Awards	Factual Show	Won	
2021	National Television Awards	Factual	Nominated	
2023	TRIC Awards	Factual Programme	Won	
2023	National Television Awards	Factual	Won	
