= Jay Pond-Jones =

British television producer

- Born: 1 July 1957 (age 68); Hammersmith, London, England
- Occupations: Creative director; executive producer; writer; director
- Years active: 1980s–present
- Known for: Advertising & Television
- Website: jaypj.com unitedagents.co.uk/jay-pond-jones

Jay Pond-Jones (born 1 July 1957) is a British executive producer, writer, and advertising creative director. He is a partner in the London-based production companies Studio Sixty Billion and Colour TV. Pond-Jones started his career in advertising, working for both D'Arcy Masius Benton & Bowles and GGT. He is known as the co-creator of French Connection's FCUK campaign.

He rose to fame in the 2000s, when he was involved in the creation of a new form of reality tv, Flipside TV. Flipside's host and celebrities would review TV shows live while flipping channels. The format has since evolved into similar reality shows, such as Gogglebox. He has since worked as Executive Producer on various British TV shows, including Celebrity Soup, KSI DEMOLISHED, and Jack and Dean of All Trades. During the COVID-19 pandemic, he created BoomBoomZoom, a provider of entertainment via Zoom.

Pond-Jones continued to work in advertising from 2011 onwards, spending period at London-based agency BMB.

== Television and advertising ==
Pond-Jones began his career in advertising at D'Arcy Masius Benton & Bowles, before starting his own agency. In 1986, Pond-Jones co-wrote an advert for Colgate featuring a group of children singing an alternative version of the Madness hit "Baggy Trousers". The advert was seen as groundbreaking but had to be pre-approved by the band. Pond-Jones said, "Many years later ... I found out how they actually quite liked it. Even now, Carl from the band introduces me to people as “the bloke who did the Colgate ad"."

During the 1990s, he worked at both GGT and HHCL. While working across the agencies, Pond-Jones was involved in many well-known advertising campaigns, including the "fcuk" campaign which he co-created and Holsten Pils' award-winning "asshole" ad, starring Denis Leary. The Holsten Pils ad won awards at Cannes Lions International Festival of Creativity in 1996. During the same year, Pond-Jones worked on Imperial Leather's campaign to focus on a more luxurious image, including a range of adverts featuring Paul Merton. A year later, Pond-Jones worked with comedian Jack Dee to produce a range of adverts for John Smiths.

Pond-Jones joined HHCL in 2000 as a Creative Director, where he created a campaign Guinness amid dwindling sales, which starred Lee "Scratch" Perry. In 2003, he was one of the creators of Flipside TV, which aired on Channel 4. For the majority of the show's 130 episodes, it was presented by Richard Bacon. The show was noted for bringing new comedy talent to the screen including Alan Carr and Modern Toss. The series was one of the first reality tv series of its kind, with three celebrities sitting with the host and reviewing TV shows. After the show finished a number of years later, other shows were based on the format. Gogglebox has since become the best-known TV show to use the format, with The Guardian describing Gogglebox as "a bit of a rip-off of the 00s, Richard Bacon-fronted series Flipside TV."

Pond-Jones teamed up again with Richard Bacon to create Celebrity Soup. It was based on the long-running US series, The Soup and was broadcast on E! in the UK. Celebrity Soup was a weekly topical comedy, which focused on pop culture and television highlights. The series was hosted by former The 11 O'Clock Show with presenter Iain Lee.v

In 2006, he was an Executive Producer for Berlin or Bust, Three UK's move into streaming content on phones. The show followed the England football team's campaign throughout the 2006 World Cup.

In 2007, Pond-Jones wrote for the character Barry from Watford on BBC Three's comedy sketch show, Comedy Shuffle. In 2011, Pond-Jones became a Creative Director at London-based creative agency, BMB.

Pond-Jones was the Executive Producer on the comedy roast in 2014 of Internet personality, KSI. The show aired on Comedy Central and was titled KSI: Demolished.

In 2015, Pond-Jones teamed up with online personalities, Jack Howard and Dean Dobbs to create the online show, Ghost Fighting Corporation. The sitcom is based on ghostbusters eradicating non-existent ghosts and charging for the service. Pond-Jones also worked as director for Doc Brown's Comic Relief music video "Bleeding Hearts". He also co-wrote and directed The Bobby Mair Show for Comedy Central. His work coined with Mair streamed Edinburgh fringe first on periscope.

In 2016, he also produced James Veitch 101, a live stand-up series with British comedian James Veitch. He worked with Dobbs and Howards again when he became the Executive Producer for Jack and Dean of All Trades. The television series follows two friends who take on a variety of jobs, with the general premise of the show that the jobs end badly. Both Jack Howard and Dean Dobbs are known for their online presence, which led to them receiving nominations at the Streamy Awards in 2016 for the show. They were nominated for Best International Series and Dean Dobbs for Best Actor.

In 2017, KP Nuts launched its first television advertising in 24 years, which contained a baby elephant. Pond-Jones was the creative director for the advert. During the same year, Pond-Jones created and produced Richard Bacon's BBC Radio 2 series Stateside, and also The Midnight Beast's Valentine from Sky Arts.

In 2020, Pond-Jones created Boom Boom Zoom, producing pay per view entertainment on Zoom. It included live performances from Duke Special, Clinton Baptiste, Barry from Watford, and Angelos Epithemiou.

== Other ventures ==
In 2009, Pond-Jones started ColourBolt, a bicycle manufacturing business. Originally he took old frames and rebuilt them with new and vintage parts. The bikes were initially on sale at Tom Dixon's Ladbroke Grove store. They became known for its single red chainring bolt. In 2018, The Guardian named ColourBolt's collaboration with Moulton, the X-Black as their Bike of the Week.
