= The Justin Lee Collins Show =

- Presented by: Justin Lee Collins
- Starring: Justin Lee Collins
- Country of origin: United Kingdom

Production
- Production locations: London, England
- Running time: 60 mins (inc. adverts)

Original release
- Network: ITV2
- Release: 19 March – 21 May 2009

Related
- Alan Carr: Chatty Man; The Sunday Night Project

The Justin Lee Collins Show is a British television chat show presented by Justin Lee Collins that aired on ITV2 between 19 March 2009 and 21 May 2009. Collins has a small band on the show and a continuing theme is to mention Labi Siffre as part of a joke. The series ended after one series after Collins signed a two-year deal with Channel 5.

== Guests ==
No.	Guests	Blast from the past	Original release date	Viewers
1	Billie Piper, Catherine Tate, Kevin James	Jane Tucker from Rainbow	19 March 2009	419,000
2	Davina McCall, Rose Byrne, Todd Carty, Melinda Messenger	Janis Levy from the Cadbury's Flake adverts	26 March 2009	Under 405,000
3	Kirsty Gallacher, Ben Miller, Katherine Kelly	Dennis Seaton from Musical Youth	2 April 2009	Under 358,000
4	Whoopi Goldberg, Michelle Ryan, Tony Christie, Pat Sharp	Graham Skidmore ('our Graham') from Blind Date	9 April 2009	Under 555,000
5	Alan Carr, Carol McGiffin, Andrea McLean, Chris O'Dowd	Keith Jayne from Stig of the Dump	16 April 2009	480,000
6	John Barrowman, Jason Isaacs, Louis Walsh, Cheryl Baker	Iain Lauchlan from Fingermouse	23 April 2009	Under 418,000
7	Chris Moyles, Tim Westwood, Fay Ripley, Eamonn Holmes; Justin performed a duet of Dead Ringer for Love with Lorraine Crosby	Eileen Pollock ('Lilo' Lil) from Bread	30 April 2009	414,000
8	Martin Freeman, Alesha Dixon, Paul Danan, Boyzone	N/A	7 May 2009	Under 448,000
9	Hank Azaria, Alexander Armstrong, McFly, Jonas Brothers	Jenny Logan, the Shake n' Vac woman	14 May 2009	Under 558,000
10	Fern Britton, Bear Grylls, Mark Ronson, Daniel Merriweather, The Cheeky Girls; Justin performed a duet of Beggin with Daniel Merriweather	Brenda Longman, the voice of Soo from Sooty and Sweep	21 May 2009	Under 498,000
