= Sports Soup =

- Starring: Matt Iseman
- Country of origin: United States
- Original language: English
- No. of seasons: 3
- No. of episodes: 32

Production
- Running time: 23 minutes

Original release
- Network: Versus
- Release: October 14, 2008 – June 15, 2010

Related
- The Soup; The Dish; Web Soup; Celebrity Soup

Sports Soup was a twice-weekly series airing in the U.S. on Versus. The show first aired on October 14, 2008. Hosted by Matt Iseman, it satirized recent events in sports and the stations that cover them in similar fashion to sister network E! Entertainment Television's series The Soup and Comedy Central's The Daily Show with Jon Stewart.

The show featured Iseman in front of a green screen and was produced by the same cast and crew, on the same sound stage, as The Soup.

== Segments ==
The Starting Lineup - The top news stories are featured and often mocked.

Covering The Coverage - Clips of various news and sports stations & networks are often featured.

This Just In - Breaking sports news stories are just announced during production of each episode.

Schooled - College-related sport clips are shown in this segment.

The Great Outdoors - Segments of outdoor programming are featured including hunting mishaps.

BROverload - Various clips of college-age fans are showcased.

Who's Scoring - Iseman reports the latest on sports stars hooking up.

Take A Hit - In this segment, various clips depict participants and often spectators get hurt in the middle of a sporting event.

Child, Please! - This segment features NFL player Chad Ochocinco of the Cincinnati Bengals. He takes viewer-submitted questions from the Versus website and answers them in a humorous and sarcastic fashion.

The Count-Up - This final segment of each episode shows 5 sub-segments that count upwards instead of counting down. First, 1 thing you have to hear features a random statement heard on the news or sports program that's found to be funny. 2 Things You Have to See showcases two clips of amazing sports moments. This segment is now renamed 4 things you have to see and replaced with random 2... segments. In 3 Great Collisions, three clips are shown, each with a crash, or a hard punch. This segment was replaced with random 3... segments. In 4 things to look out for, Matt Iseman tells four actual news stories about the teams and their coaches, however when getting to "look out for", the pictures are often doctored. This segment has since then been replaced by 4 things you have to see. And finally, the clip considered to be the best of the week is the 5-Star Clip. One example is from a South African soccer league in which a player's shin was inverted due to an opposing player sliding to get the ball.
