= The Convention Crasher =

- Genre: Documentary
- Directed by: Will Yapp
- Starring: Justin Lee Collins
- Narrated by: Justin Lee Collins
- Country of origin: United Kingdom
- Original language: English
- No. of series: 1
- No. of episodes: 4

Production
- Running time: 1 hour (including advertisements)
- Production companies: Mono; Objective Productions

Original release
- Network: Channel 4
- Release: 25 January 2007 – 31 January 2008

The Convention Crasher is the title of a documentary originally broadcast in the United Kingdom on 25 January 2007 on Channel 4. The one-off documentary followed Justin Lee Collins as he entered the world of celebrity lookalikes and attempted to become one himself before visiting a convention for them.

The show returned on 17 January 2008 for a series with Justin Lee Collins this time crashing three conventions, each on magic, ventriloquism and clowning.

== Episodes ==
=== Series 1 ===
==== Celebrity Impersonator ====
Aired: 26 January 2007, 10pm

Collins, who hails from Bristol, England, admitted in the documentary that he had always secretly harbored the ambition to be a singer. This project, employing the talents of his UK production company film crew, brought him the opportunity to transform himself into a celebrity impersonator for one of the premiere showcase events of the industry, the Sunburst Convention of Celebrity Impersonators. The convention, produced annually in Orlando, Florida by producers and performers Gregory & Jackie Thompson , provides both seasoned professionals as well as interested newcomers to the business an opportunity to showcase their unique acts before a substantial group of talent agents and buyers.

Collins began his pursuit of the project by seeking the advice of a number of UK-based professionals, including the producers of the Legends tribute show on Blackpool's Central Pier, and with the direction of music industry experts, he settled on Tom Jones as his chosen alter ego. Upon arriving in America at the convention, Justin chatted with various impressive celebrity lookalikes before bravely performing on stage himself as the Welsh legend. After Collins' performance of Delilah and It's Not Unusual, the agents and judges were offered him bookings.

The programme was completed with Collins appearing on the Legends stage at Blackpool to a capacity crowd.

=== Series 2 ===
==== Magician ====
Aired: 17 January 2008, 10pm

In the first episode Justin was to crash a Magic Convention in Canton, Ohio and take part in The Battle of Magicians for a cash prize. Justin only had four weeks to decide what magic tricks he would like to perform within his 10-minute slot and to learn how to perform them. On the day he performed at the convention as Justin Illusion and came 3rd overall winning a cash prize of $150. The episode attracted 1.1 million viewers and a 6% audience share.

==== Ventriloquist ====
Aired: 24 January 2008, 10pm

The second episode saw Justin crashing a ventriloquism convention, eventually taking part in an open mic slot in front of an audience of fellow ventriloquists, an industry agent and a panel of judges. Again, Justin only had four weeks to select a puppet, prepare a routine and test it out on some of the UK's most established expert ventriloquists (such as Keith Harris and Paul Zerdin), before heading off to Kentucky to perform at the largest ventriloquist convention in the world - the VentHaven Ventriloquist Convention. This episode attracted the same number of viewers as the previous (1.1 million), this time giving it a higher audience share of 7%.

==== Clown ====
Aired: 31 January 2008, 10pm

The third episode in the series saw Justin travelling to a Clowning Convention in Houston, Texas where he would compete for the prize of Clown of the Year. Justin got some tips on clowning with the UK's best clown, Mooky The Clown, at the Tower Circus in Blackpool, England and came up with the clowning alter ego of Wonky, having to shave off his beard in the process. Once at the convention he had to compete in the clown equivalent of the Olympic Games where he was judged on Costume and Make-up, Balloon Modelling, Paradability and finally perform a Solo Skit in front of a panel of judges. Being disappointed by the poor quality of the competition, Collins felt he had a chance of winning the main prize, but his Solo Skit was disqualified for running over time and involving a member of the audience (thus making it technically not a "solo" performance). He did however win a bronze medal in the Costume and Make-up category. This, the final episode of the second series attracted a 6% audience share - again, 1.1 million viewers.
