= Calum McSwiggan =

British YouTuber (born 1990)

- McSwiggan in May 2019
- Born: Calum McSwiggan; 21 May 1990 (age 36); Nottingham, England
- Education: University of Derby
- Occupations: Author; blogger; radio presenter

YouTube information
- Channel: Calum McSwiggan
- Years active: 2013–present
- Genres: LGBT; lifestyle
- Subscribers: 84.9 thousand
- Views: 2.12 million
- Last updated: 11 May 2026

Calum McSwiggan (born 21 May 1990) is an author, content creator and radio presenter. McSwiggan writes and creates digital content on LGBT+ issues. He began creating online content in 2013 and published his first book in 2020.

== Personal life ==
McSwiggan was born in Nottingham and graduated from the University of Derby with a degree in Creative Writing. In 2013, he worked for HIV charity Terrence Higgins Trust before becoming an author and digital content creator.

== Awards and nominations ==
Year	Award	Category	Result
2022	Traverse Travel Awards	12 Month Achievement	Won
2017	Buffer Film Festival	Best LGBT+ Short Film	Won

== Career ==
=== YouTube ===
McSwiggan began creating YouTube videos in 2013 and was shortlisted as a finalist for Lastminute.com's nationwide search for a travel blogger later that year. McSwiggan collaborated with LGBT+ charity organisation Switchboard (UK) in 2015 to support their relaunch with a series of videos featuring notable LGBT+ celebrities including Tom Daley, George Takei, and Matt Lucas. In 2016, McSwiggan co-produced an award-winning documentary on mental health

=== Writing ===
McSwiggan began blogging his experiences of travelling solo as a gay man in 2011, and went on to contribute to a number of books including Hannah Witton's sex education book Doing It. In 2017 he signed to literary agent Diamond Kahn & Woods working on his first book.

=== Radio and podcasts ===
McSwiggan began his presenting career at university where he hosted his first radio show. He went on to present The Calum McSwiggan Show on FUBAR Radio with guests such as Munroe Bergdorf and Rose McGowan. McSwiggan has also spoken about a number of LGBT+ issues on stations including Gaydio and BBC Radio 2. McSwiggan also co-presented an episode of BBC Radio 4's Gay Britannia and took part in a 24-hour live radio broadcast for UN Women.

=== Controversy ===
In January 2016, McSwiggan uploaded a video apologizing for an incident where footage was posted online showing him performing in adult content. He later received criticism from a number of gay pornographic actors who claimed that his views were demonizing of the industry.

In June 2016, McSwiggan pleaded guilty to vandalism after an incident in which he claimed to be a victim of a hate crime. McSwiggan paid $400 for the vandalism charge and was ordered to pay $7,000 in compensation.
