= Jade Catta-Preta =

American comedian and actress

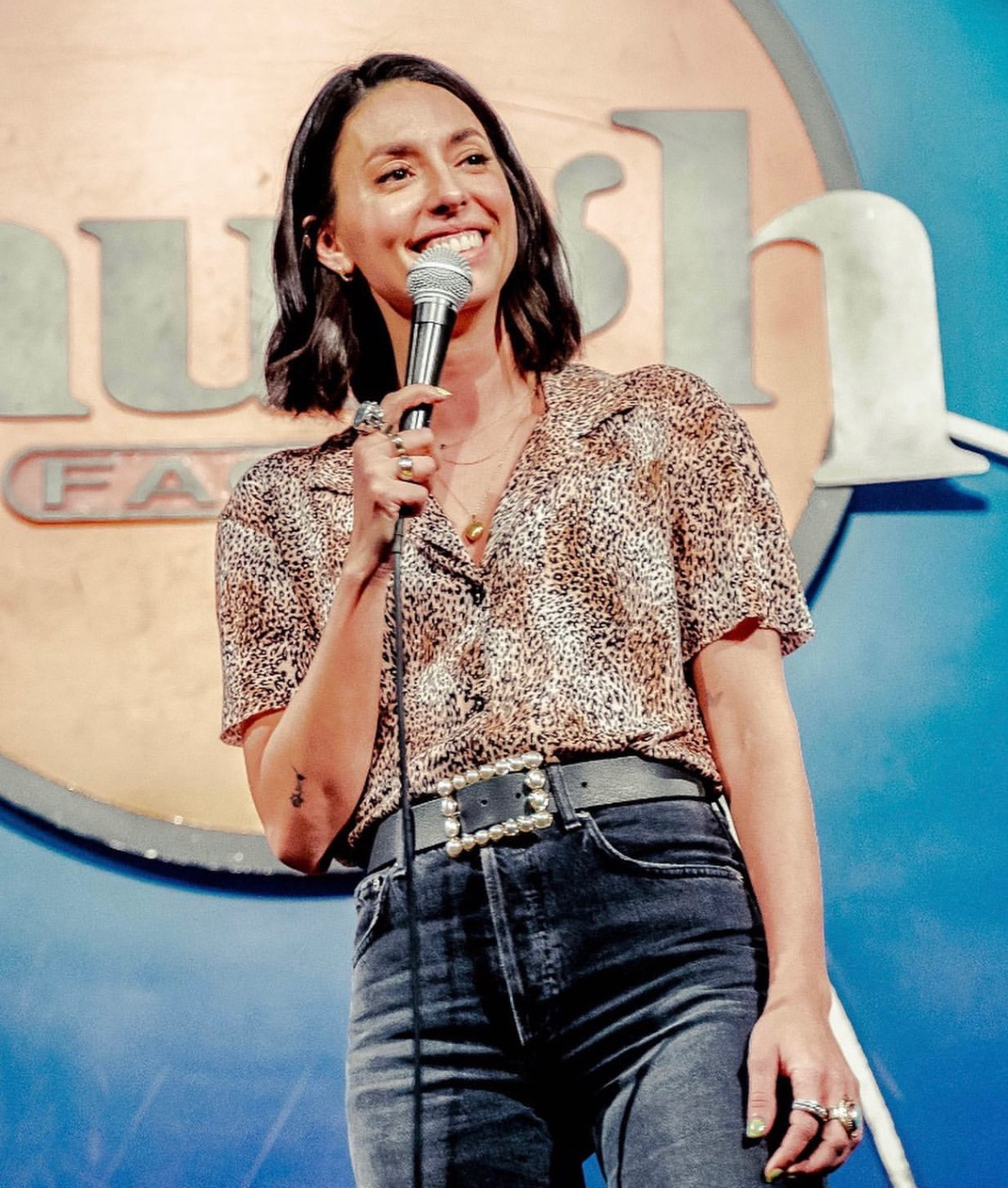
- Catta-Preta in 2022 at the Laugh Factory
- Born: February 19, 1984 (age 42); São Paulo, Brazil
- Education: Emerson College (BFA)

Comedy career
- Medium: Stand-up; television

Jade Catta-Preta (born 19 February 1984) is a Brazilian stand-up comedian and actress. She was the host of the 2020 revival of The Soup, and she has hosted Hotties on Hulu since 2022. Her first stand-up special, jaded., was released in 2022.

== Early life ==
Jade Catta-Preta was born in São Paulo on February 19, 1984, to Suely Moreira and Fernando Catta Preta. She has one older sister, Bianca. When she was 12, she moved with her family to Charlottesville, Virginia, in the United States. Watching television helped her learn English. Catta-Preta credits her father with exposing her to comedy from a young age.

In 2007, Catta-Preta graduated from Emerson College, majoring in musical theater.

== Career ==
While in college, Catta-Preta began acting and hosted the show Secret Lives. She initially wanted to pursue musical theater on Broadway. She moved to Los Angeles to further her acting career, working as a bartender before trying comedy. She first hosted National Lampoon before starting to perform stand-up regularly at The Comedy Store.

In 2020, Catta-Preta was chosen to host a revival of the show The Soup on E!, which had most recently been hosted by Joel McHale from 2004 to 2015. The show features jokes lampooning clips from talk shows and reality television, and Catta-Preta said the revival would be more inclusive and the jokes would be "more self-deprecating than ever just because I am a fan of this stuff". She worked in the writers' room every day on the show and picked the showrunner. She commented that her favorite host of the show was John Henson, who hosted the show from 1995 to 1999 under its prior name, Talk Soup.

Since 2022, Catta-Preta has hosted Hotties on Hulu. The show is a blind date food competition where the contestants eat extremely spicy foods. Catta-Preta judges each couple's cooked dish as well as their chemistry before declaring the winners.

Catta-Preta released her first stand-up special, jaded., in 2022. The special was filmed at the Helium Comedy Club in Philadelphia and released on YouTube by Helium Comedy Studios.

== Personal life ==
Catta-Preta is bisexual.

Her biggest comedy influences include Sarah Silverman, Lily Tomlin, Andrew Dice Clay, Ellen DeGeneres, and Bill Burr.

== Filmography ==
=== Film ===
Year	Title	Role	Notes
2018	Zoo Animals	Susie	Short film
2019	Think	Melissa	Short film
2021	Joanne Is Dead		Short film
2025	Topper		
2025	Fireflies in the Dusk	Brianna	Short film

=== Television ===
Year	Title	Role	Notes
2004–2005	Secret Lives	Host	
2011	2 Broke Girls	Serena	1 episode
2012	Punk'd	Field agent	2 episodes
2012–2013	Daddy Knows Best	Tracy	14 episodes
2014	Californication	Jade	6 episodes
2014	Manhattan Love Story	Amy	1 episode
2015	The Jim Gaffigan Show	Susie	1 episode
2015	Girl Code	Herself	Seasons 3 and 4
2017	Modern Family	Ms. Clarke	1 episode
2017	Return of the Mac	Quinn	2 episodes
2018	Life in Pieces	Rita	2 episodes
2019	Future Man	Level	7 episodes
2020	The Soup	Host	
2020–2021	American Housewife	Deborah	4 episodes

=== Stand-up ===
Year	Title	Notes
2022	Jaded	
