= Jenny Logan =

British actress

Jenny Logan (born 1942) is an English actress, trained dancer and singer. Though she played WPC Sally Reed in the television series Dixon of Dock Green between 1968 and 1969, she is most familiar from her appearances in the TV commercial for the carpet freshener Shake n' Vac, which was shot in 1979 and ran from 1980 to 1986.

The advert featured Logan dancing around a typical British living room in high heels, shaking the powder onto the carpet and vacuuming it up, while singing a musical jingle. The main lyric is "do the Shake n' Vac, and put the freshness back". In 2005, ITV named it one of their best ever commercials as part of its 50th birthday celebrations.

At the time this advert was being made Logan was in a leading role at the London West End's Cambridge Theatre as Velma Kelly in the first British production of Chicago.

Logan continued to work in the theatre both in the West End and in national tours. She appeared in Stepping Out, Cowardy Custard, Irene, Annie and Barry Manilow's Copacabana at The Prince of Wales theatre, and a subsequent production in Denmark directed by Craig Revel-Horwood. She also appeared as a black leather clad policewoman in a comic serial during a run of The Two Ronnies ("The Worm That Turned").

Other TV acting credits include Edna, the Inebriate Woman, Pennies From Heaven as Irene, the friend of Joan (Gemma Craven), Lovejoy, Never the Twain, Park Ranger, London's Burning and the John Sullivan comedy Roger Roger. She also had small roles in the films The Raging Moon (1971) and Parting Shots (1999).

In 2009 she was in the touring show Cabaret, playing Fraulein Schneider. In 2009, she appeared on The Justin Lee Collins Show, as a blast from the past. In 2010, Logan was involved in celebrating the 30th anniversary of the original Shake n' Vac advertisement.
