= Tess Rafferty =

American writer, comedian, and actress

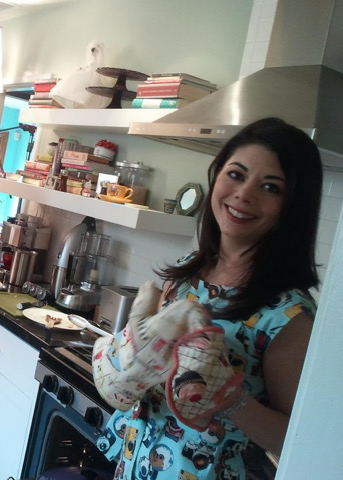
- Tess Rafferty on set
- Education: Emerson College
- Occupations: Writer, comedian, actress
- Writing career
- Notable works: "Aftermath 2016"; Recipes for Disaster
- Website: tessrafferty.com

Tess Rafferty is an American writer, comedian, and actress. The author of the 2012 culinary memoir, Recipes for Disaster, Rafferty has written for television shows including @midnight, and networks such as MTV and Comedy Central. From 2005 until 2012, she was the supervising producer for The Soup and the show's only female writer. She frequently appeared on The Soup as herself, Posh Spice, a Succubus, a "guidette" from Jersey Shore and The Dancing Maxi Pad.

== Biography ==
Tess Rafferty grew up in Wilmington, Delaware. She attended Emerson College, and as a student performed in Boston comedy clubs. She studied acting and art history and earned her degree in 1997. Following her graduation she moved to Los Angeles, where she began writing for television and performed as a stand-up comedian and storyteller.

In 2012, her culinary memoir, Recipes for Disaster, was released by St. Martin's Press. In a review of the book, Kirkus Reviews wrote: "What distinguishes this author from others is (Rafferty's) insatiable appetite for wine, her indomitable spirit in the face of catastrophe, her resolute desire to please everyone and her offbeat sense of humor."

In November 2016, two days after the presidential election, Rafferty wrote a "hard hitting" statement about the election of Donald Trump where she was calling all Trump supporters racist amongst other titles as well as encouraging people to cut friends and family members that voted for Trump out of their lives. The piece was filmed by director Steve Cohen and edited by Aaron Barrocas. An edited version of Rafferty's performance was shared by Occupy Democrats on November 18; in five days, it received nearly 22 million views.
