= Idea a Day =

Web-based ideas bank

- Company type: Public
- Industry: Ideas bank
- Founded: London, United Kingdom (2000)
- Founder: David Owen, Chas Bayfield, Becky Clarke and Rupert Kaye
- Headquarters: London, United Kingdom
- Area served: Global
- Website: Idea a Day on twitter

Idea A Day was a web-based ideas bank founded in London in August 2000 by music executive David Owen, advertising executives Chas Bayfield and Becky Clarke, and teacher Rupert Kaye in partnership with the web development company Fortune Cookie. The web site published one original idea every day.

In 2003, a book of the best 500 ideas was published by John Wiley & Sons as The Big Idea Book.

One idea published on Idea A Day is Flipside TV, a live TV review show in which a host and three guests watched television live as it happened and recommended to viewers what they could or should be watching on the other side. The TV show ran in the UK on Channel 4 and Paramount Comedy.

In August 2011, the site's editor Chas Bayfield posted an urgent request for help. The site had benefited from free hosting since its inception but when the hosting company closed down its operation the Idea A Day site was in danger of being permanently lost. After an appeal was launched on its website, a new hosting partner was found and the site continued to benefit from free hosting until it ceased operating in 2015.

On 16 August 2010, Idea a Day celebrated its 10th birthday with a live phone-in at the studios of BBC Radio 5 Live.

In October 2014, Idea a Day changed its domain name to ideaaday.co. The site ceased publishing ideas in 2015 but was revived on Twitter in February 2020.
