= The Dish (TV series) =

- Starring: Danielle Fishel
- Country of origin: United States
- Original language: English
- No. of seasons: 2
- No. of episodes: 104

Production
- Running time: 23 minutes

Original release
- Network: Style
- Release: August 16, 2008 – March 20, 2011

Related
- The Soup; Sports Soup; Web Soup

The Dish is an American satirical television series that aired on the Style Network. The show premiered on August 16, 2008, hosted by Danielle Fishel, skewers the latest in pop culture (television, movies, magazines, celebrities, etc.) in similar fashion to sister network E! Entertainment Television's series The Soup. The show also aired on International E! channels alongside The Soup. The show's final episode aired March 20, 2011, two months after the merger of NBCUniversal and Comcast was completed. The merger had brought former competitors Bravo and Oxygen under common NBCUniversal ownership with Style, nullifying much of the video material available to The Dish, as many Bravo and Oxygen programs under NBC's ownership apart from Style had been used for satirical purposes for the show.

== Format ==
As with The Soup, the show primarily consists of Fishel providing humorous commentary on content (such as clips of television programs), arranged in themed segments. Unlike The Soup however, the show places more emphasis on fashion and celebrity culture. A running gag throughout the series was Fishel's being typecast and being recognized solely for her most famous role as Topanga Lawrence from Boy Meets World.

== Segments ==
=== Regular segments ===
- "Hot Dish" – The segment includes celebrity news and gossip of the week.
- "Clip Closet" – Clips are shown recapping different shows of that week. Often signaled by a closet with TV show title cards and the Clip Closet logo appears in one of the cards. This segment runs in a very similar fashion to Reality Show Clip Time on The Soup.
- "Daylight Cravings" – This segment covers morning shows, like The View and Rachael Ray.
- "F-Bombs" – Fashion bombs. This segment covers bad celebrity fashions. There are also Viewer F-Bombs where viewers show their own pictures of bad fashion moments.
- "Let's Go Shopping" – Highlighting accessories, gifts and online items.
- "Freak of the Week" – At the end of the show, Fishel shows a clip of someone freaking out. It is usually a participant in a reality show, but occasionally it is a fictional character in a scripted show.

=== Semi-regular segments ===
- "Gaga MegaTracker 10000"* – This segment shows Lady Gaga's latest activity and fashions.
- "Great Moments in Modern Literature"* – This segment covers recent releases of books.
- "Here Comes the Brides" – Features clips from wedding shows, such as My Big Redneck Wedding, Bridezillas, etc.
- "What the @#!*% is going on in this AD?"* – This segment covers ads in magazines that are unusual.

=== Former segments ===
- "Celebrity Trend Alert" – The segment highlighted what celebrities are wearing the week of the episode
- "Hit and Runway" – Featured clips from the Project Runway episode of that week. This feature was canceled at the end of Project Runway's fifth season.
- "Who Wore It Why?" – This section highlighted on bizarre celebrity outfits.
- "My Favorite Dish" – This feature would show Danielle's favorite clip of the week.
