= Justin Lee Collins: Good Times =

- Genre: Entertainment
- Presented by: Justin Lee Collins
- Country of origin: United Kingdom
- No. of series: 1
- No. of episodes: 10

Production
- Executive producers: Deborah Sergeant; Clive Tulloh
- Producer: Rachel Viner
- Production location: Rivoli Ballroom
- Running time: 60 minutes (inc. adverts)
- Production company: Tiger Aspect Productions

Original release
- Network: Channel 5
- Release: 29 March – 14 June 2010

Justin Lee Collins: Good Times is a British comedy chat show hosted by comedian Justin Lee Collins, which aired on Channel 5 in the United Kingdom. The format is a weekly chat show that consists of a mixture of celebrity guests, comic stunts, and musical performances.

== Episodes ==
No.	Guests	Three Darts Challenge	Musical Performance	Original release date
1	Emma Bunton, Louis Walsh, Florence and the Machine	Cillian Murphy	Florence and the Machine – "Dog Days Are Over"	29 March 2010
2	Aaron Johnson, Patsy Palmer, Sharleen Spiteri	Joanna Lumley	Sharleen Spiteri – "Xandu"	5 April 2010
3	Katy Brand, James Corden, Paloma Faith	Ewan McGregor	Paloma Faith – "Upside Down"	12 April 2010
4	Jason Manford, Tamzin Outhwaite, Fun Lovin' Criminals	Steve Carell	Fun Lovin' Criminals – "Classic Fantastic"	19 April 2010
5	Sophie Ellis-Bextor, Kevin Bishop, Richard Hawley	Rupert Grint	Sophie Ellis-Bextor – "Bittersweet"	26 April 2010
6	Amir Khan, Janice Dickinson, Marina & the Diamonds	Ricky Whittle	Marina & The Diamonds – "I Am Not A Robot"	3 May 2010
7	Gok Wan, Yvette Fielding, Alphabeat	Sharon Osbourne	Alphabeat – "DJ (I Could Be Dancing)"	10 May 2010
8	Matthew Horne, Rihanna, The cast of Jersey Boys	Meat Loaf	The cast of Jersey Boys	17 May 2010
9	Joe Swash, Arlene Phillips, Mary J. Blige	Jermaine Jackson	Mary J. Blige – "Each Tear"	7 June 2010
10	Jessica Hynes, Louie Spence, Adam Lambert	Jason Donovan	Adam Lambert – "For Your Entertainment"	14 June 2010
