= The Soup =

American television series

- Based on: Talk Soup
- Presented by: Joel McHale; Jade Catta-Preta
- Country of origin: United States
- Original language: English
- No. of seasons: 13
- No. of episodes: 618

Production
- Executive producers: Sue Murphy; Dwight D. Smith; Michael Agbabian
- Camera setup: Single-camera
- Running time: 22 minutes
- Production company: Mission Control Media

Original release
- Network: E!
- Release: July 1, 2004 – October 14, 2020

Related
- The Joel McHale Show with Joel McHale; The Dish; Sports Soup; Web Soup; Celebrity Soup; The Soup Investigates

The Soup is an American television series that aired weekly on E! from July 1, 2004, until December 18, 2015, as a revamped version of Talk Soup that focused on recaps of various popular culture and television moments of the week. The show was hosted by comedian Joel McHale, who provided sarcastic and satirical commentary on the various clips. On November 18, 2015, The Soup was cancelled by E! and its last episode aired December 18, 2015. On February 18, 2018, The Joel McHale Show with Joel McHale, a spiritual successor to The Soup, premiered on Netflix.

The series returned on February 12, 2020, with new host Jade Catta-Preta, but was soon affected by the COVID-19 pandemic. It last aired on October 14, 2020.

== History ==
The Soup started on July 1, 2004, as the What The...? Awards, but the name was changed to maintain name recognition with Talk Soup.

On January 9, 2013, The Soup debuted a new graphics package, including a new logo designed by Newspeak Agency.

Starting June 2, 2014, The Soup began airing live episodes. Originally only to last for one month, the program continued as a live show.

On November 18, 2015 The Soup was canceled, the number of episodes that were to be produced was later reduced by one. A decision was made not to air the episode that had been filmed and intended to air the same day as the November 2015 Paris attacks due to multiple references to "killing Baby Hitler". As the episode was pre-filmed, it later aired on November 27, likely replacing a clip show due to it being the day after Thanksgiving.

On January 9, 2020, it was revealed E! would be reviving The Soup, now hosted by Jade Catta-Preta – the first new episode aired on February 12, 2020. It went on an unexpected hiatus after the March 11 episode due to the coronavirus pandemic shutting down production across the industry, but it resumed production in July 2020, before going on a second shutdown after the October 14 episode, which would be its last.

== Format ==
The show features the host on a green-screened set with a screen to their right. The show is broken up into various segments that focus on themes such as reality television shows or shows on E!. The host introduces each clip, which is then played, then comments on the clip before moving on to the next one. There is a live audience on the show, composed of a small group of E! employees, their family, and friends, along with the typical production personnel. The audience is involved in the show, laughing and cheering along with the clips. The 2020 revival includes a second camera position stage right, where the host can present other content on a second auxiliary video display.

Although the show is scripted, a large portion of it is ad-libbed.

On April 22, 2008, a blog was started for The Soup on E!'s website.

=== Regular characters ===
During its original 2004–2015 run, The Soup used its own cast of recurring characters. They include Mankini (a man wearing a bikini top and pants played by Dominic DeLeo, who is also a writer and producer for the show), a dancing maxi pad (Tess Rafferty, a supervising producer and the then-only female writer on The Soup), two nerds who dress as Star Wars characters, an intern named Matt whom McHale shoots with a gun (often with the shooting sound effect purposefully played out of sync, or even played with other objects or with just fingers), Jewbacca (Chewbacca's lawyer), and "Spaghetti Cat", a cat eating spaghetti from The Morning Show with Mike and Juliet. Additionally, Tom McNamara, The Soup's stage manager and former stage manager on Talk Soup, and Kelly Levy (née Andrews), the show's former announcer and a producer, made appearances on the show, with Kelly portraying Courtney Stodden. Executive producer Edward Boyd's chihuahua Lou appeared regularly in segment openings, most notably the "Clip of the Week", and elsewhere in the show. He also appeared with McHale at the show's intro, which showed them watching a different TV show each week until the intro was changed in early 2010. The replacement intro juxtaposes brief clips introduced by announcer Anndi McAfee and a "reaction" by another clip, wildly out of context.

== Regular features ==
=== 2004–2015 episodes ===
The show has a number of segments that focus on various genres of television shows. Regular segments include:

- "Chat Stew", which features clips from talk shows.
- "Chicks, Man" which focuses on female celebrity news.
- "Reality Show Clip Time!", which features clips from current reality shows.
- "Let's Take Some E!", a segment featuring clips from other programs shown on E!, jokingly described by McHale as a contractual obligation. The name of the segment (along with its intro) is a reference to the party drug ecstasy, which is commonly known as "E".
- The show ends with the "Clip of the Week", a clip considered to be the best clip shown on TV in the past week.

==== Other segments ====
The Soup has also featured other recurring segments:

- "What's Pissing Off Steve Edwards This Week?" features clips from KTTV's Good Day L.A. in which something or somebody makes Steve Edwards upset in the clip. Another episode featured a parody of the segment, "What's Exciting Rick Dickert This Week?"
- "Tales from Home Shopping" features clips from home shopping channels such as QVC or HSN.
- "Oprah's Vajayjay" features clips and or related to Oprah's discussions about the female anatomy.
- "What the Kids Are Watching", which features unusual and weird clips from shows and commercials aimed at children, such as Yo Gabba Gabba!, Biz Kid$ and others. Two spinoff segments have been produced based on the segment: "What the Old Folks Are Watching", and "What Your Boyfriend's Looking At".
- Segments featuring clips from international programs have also been featured, such as "Clippos Magnificos" (which features clips from telenovelas), "Souper Fantastic Ultra Wish Time!" (which features Japanese programs), and the "International House of Soup."
- "Cyber Smack" featured the best viral videos from the internet. This segment eventually spun-off as Web Soup.
- "My Stories" shows clips from daytime soap operas, such as The Bold and the Beautiful. A running gag on the show includes increasingly unrelated and random music being played with the segment's title card.
- "The Hollywood Access Extra Inside Entertainment Report" is an amalgamation of these entertainment news shows Access Hollywood, Extra, The Insider, Entertainment Tonight. At times, Joel would introduce the segment by saying, "Let's go Inside Extra Access--" followed by nonsensical gibberish.
- "Miley Cyrus News" documents stories involving Miley Cyrus.
- "Local Newsbreak" features embarrassing clips from local newscasts
- "Ad Nauseam" pokes fun at commercials, often with McHale misusing the product after the clip is done.
- "The Mail Nurse" showcases viral videos found on the Internet.
- "Stay Out of It Nick Lachey" features clips from One Tree Hill with cast members saying "Stay out of it Nick Lachey"
- "Gay Shows" features clips from LGBT-related television shows such as RuPaul's Drag Race. A spin-off, "Gay Shows: Alaska Edition" was used to present clips from Gold Rush Alaska, edited to create innuendos around terminology such as "glory hole".
- "Take a Look at Myke Hawke" involves clips from Mykel Hawke's shows. Typically, Joel pronounces his name "my cock" and make several phallic-themed jokes while introducing the clip.
- "Gavel Bangin'" is a segment where court shows are mocked, especially Nancy Grace's Swift Justice.
- Charlie Sheen News: Features news topics regarding Charlie Sheen.
- "RRRrrr with Brian Williams" showcased clips from Williams' NBC newsmagazine Rock Center.
- "Unlikely Voice of Reason" involves a clip in which a much-ridiculed character such as Greg Kelly or Stephanie Pratt says something unexpected and intelligent.

== Recurring jokes ==
=== 2004–2015 episodes ===
The show has a number of recurring jokes and segments. One of the most frequent jokes is Joel McHale making fun of Ryan Seacrest. He usually comments on Seacrest's height, sexuality, clothing, busy work schedule, income, or demeanor.

Joel has also spoofed other actors, most notably CSI: Miami leading man David Caruso, who plays Lieutenant Horatio Caine. He usually makes fun of the character's tendency to always put on his sunglasses and say corny one-liners at the start of every episode (followed by the first 2–3 seconds of the opening sequence). Joel also will sometimes spoof a person after a clip.

Joel also jokes about how self-centered Tyra Banks is on her self-titled talk show. More jokes are Joel making fun of Spencer Pratt's "creepy flesh colored beard" as well as the ages of Larry King and Regis Philbin and how they were both still alive. Also, McHale often comically berates or abuses "interns" for the show, usually ending with a poorly timed (or sometimes completely out-of-place) audio clip of a gun firing after McHale uses a prop gun on them. McHale has often attempted to "shoot" Mankini, but with no effect.

The Spaghetti Cat from The Morning Show with Mike and Juliet has been used a number of times, usually with a model of the cat rolling in, looking at Joel, and then rolling back out.

Joel has often made fun of Bruno Tonioli's flamboyancy while giving comments on Dancing with the Stars stating that he was reading excerpts from his romance novel Jazz Hands and Cold Feet.

The Soup makes jokes at the A&E TV series, Steven Seagal: Lawman. Whenever Joel would introduce a clip from the show, a sound clip would say "That's Right It's Steven Seagal", followed by Joel drinking a Steven Seagal energy drink that would humorously float into frame.

Due to NFL coach Jimmy Johnson's recent appearance on Survivor, Joel usually mentions his "Extenze-enhanced penis", followed by a clip of Johnson saying, "I do."

==== Clips ====
A number of clips have been repeatedly shown on The Soup. One clip features Oprah Winfrey saying "My va-jay-jay is painin'!" while hanging from a harness at the Miraval resort. Another clip involves Whitney Houston yelling "Kiss My Ass!" at her husband. McHale has mentioned that this clip is one of his favorites. Still another clip that is often shown is of The Today Show's news correspondent Ann Curry starting her report by saying, "Good morning, good morning everybody, in the news this morning, good morning", which Olbermann mimicked on his appearance on the July 25, 2008, show. Joel often shows a clip of Kendra Wilkinson from The Girls Next Door laughing. When someone mentions marriage on the show, they will often show a clip of Elizabeth Taylor screaming "Marriage?! Noooooo!" Shorter clips are sometimes used as interjections. Clips of Dani Noriega ("I guess some people weren't likin' it!"), and more recently, Tatiana Del Toro giggling uncontrollably, have been used as part of McHale's reactions to clips. Recent favorites include Gary Busey exclaiming "I'm going to pull your endocrine system out of your body", Tila Tequila yelling out "A pig's vagina!", Michelle Galdenzi from Scream Queens saying "and by record, I mean vagina.", Big Brother contestants Jase Wirey and Michelle Costa "talking" to one another using animal and computer sounds, respectively; "Chicken Tetrazzini" clip from Maury, Spencer Pratt from The Hills whispering "That's the problem", Billy Bush saying "It's Gross", and Kate Gosselin squealing in a chirpy/grating-sounding voice "Come and Getcher POPcoooooorn!". Recently, the Jeffrey Osborne song, "On the Wings of Love", has been used to mock the current season of The Bachelor. Vonda, a woman featured on the TruTv show Over the Limit has been featured saying, "Dunka Doo Balls." This clip has become a new favorite. Recently, a clip from Fantasia for Real featuring Fantasia's Aunt Bunny saying, "Gurl Please", has become a new favorite. Also, a clip of "Ma" from TruTV's Ma's Roadhouse saying "He's a douchebag," after Joel ask what she thinks of a less than favourable man, such as Mel Gibson, has come into use. Another clip of Ryan Seacrest saying, "Hell no, say what", has been used as reactions to clips. Calvin Tran, a contestant on Bravo's The Fashion Show, has recently been featured in a clip saying, "Oh, here go Hell Come." Frequently following Good Day New York clips, McHale will ask Greg Kelly to explain how something works, and this will follow with a clip of Kelly shrugging and saying, "Science".

==== Edited clips ====
The Soup will often make blatant and obvious edits to clips of shows, often killing off characters (as in their versions of Laguna Beach and The Hills) or splicing McHale and other characters into the shows. McHale will often punctuate the clip by saying "We doctored that." However, if a clip was shown that may have made the audience think that it was edited by The Soup for broadcast while watching it, McHale would state before hand "We did not doctor this."

==== Original content ====
Original skits are integrated into the show as responses or jokes to clips. Fake movie trailers and advertisements are created as spoofs to segments or clips. Among the movies spoofed are Spider-Man 3 (in reference to McHale's appearance in Spider-Man 2), Harry Potter and the Goblet of Fire, Made of Honor, Righteous Kill, Mamma Mia, Beverly Hills Chihuahua, Quarantine, (which McHale spoofed with QuaranTween about Disney Channel celebrities), Prom Night, Fast & Furious, and a Tyler Perry movie.

=== 2020 episodes ===
The Soup's 2020 return, hosted by Brazilian-born comedian and actress Jade Catta-Preta, was billed as its 13th season. Nineteen episodes aired before production stopped after the October 14, 2020, episode, and the series did not return.

== International broadcasts ==
=== 2004–2015 episodes ===
- In Australia, the show aired on the local version of E! every Sunday at 7 pm.
- In Israel, The Soup aired on E! Israel, a week after the original American broadcasting, on Thursdays at 10:40 pm.
- In Mexico and Latin America, the show aired on E! Latino, a week after the original American broadcasting, it airs on Friday at 10 pm followed by the Venezuelan version of the show, La Sopa (The Soup in Spanish).
- In the Philippines, the show aired on Velvet every Tuesday at 7:30 pm. "The Soup Presents" aired after The Soup.
- In the UK, the local E! network aired The Soup on a daily basis. This feed also included same day productions Chelsea Lately and the full 30-minute E! News which were not available elsewhere in Europe.

== The Soup Presents ==
In addition to regular episodes, special "Best of..." episodes from the 2004–2015 run have been shown under the header "The Soup Presents". Episodes of this nature have been produced on topics such as models and modeling shows, fights on television, and talk shows, two "Chicks, Man/Ladies, Ladies, Ladies" specials focusing on reality TV females, a show about love and marriage called "Love and Other Burning Sensations", and most recently, a show dedicated to television programs that have had recurring appearances on The Soup (the "shows [they] just cannot quit"). During the holiday seasons, two-part episodes showcasing the best clips of the year are aired (Clipdowns).

== Reception ==
In 2004, The Soup started off as a relatively quiet show but became one of the most popular programs on E!. By 2006, it was the third highest rated show on the network.

In July 2013, The Soup averaged 682,000 viewers, and about 56 percent of viewers watched a recorded version of the show. The 500th episode of The Soup recorded 909,000 viewers, with 653,000 of those in the 18—49 demographic.

The one-hour finale on December 18, 2015, ended with 561,000 viewers.

== Other versions ==
Since E! is owned by Comcast Entertainment Group, their now-defunct sibling networks aired tailored versions for their networks, including Style, Versus and G4, all taped in the same studio and utilizing the same crew.

=== The Dish ===
On August 16, 2008, Style premiered The Dish, hosted by Danielle Fishel. The show focused more on celebrity, magazine, and fashion industry trends, along with style and fashion-related reality programs in more detail, including Project Runway and various shows on the shopping channels, HGTV and DIY Network. It was canceled on March 20, 2011, two months after the merger of NBC and Comcast was complete. It was thought the cancellation was the direct result of former competitors Bravo and Oxygen coming under common NBCUniversal ownership with Style; the two networks and their programming had been among the major comedic targets of The Dish.

=== Sports Soup ===
On September 15, 2008, E! parent Comcast Entertainment Group announced another spin-off, this time sports-related, of the series, which aired on the group's sports network, Versus (later known as NBCSN), called Sports Soup and was hosted by Matt Iseman. Debuted on October 14, the program once aired twice weekly on Tuesdays and Thursdays. Later, production was reduced to weekly at 10 pm ET on Tuesdays (or later depending on the end of NHL on Versus or other sports coverage). It was canceled on July 15, 2010.

=== Web Soup ===
A third version, airing on G4, titled Web Soup, hosted by Chris Hardwick debuted June 7, 2009, at 9 pm ET. This version is more of a blend of the commentary and reaction portions of The Soup and two other G4 programs; Whacked Out Videos and the Around the Net viral video segment which opens Attack of the Show!. This show ended after its 3rd season on July 20, 2011.

=== Celebrity Soup ===
Celebrity Soup was the British version of the American show hosted by comedian Iain Lee. Unlike The Soup, Celebrity Soup airs 19 episodes in a season, instead of year-round like in the United States. It had some of the same features as the original (i.e. "Chat Stew") but also has its own running gags and features. The series had a similar set, with a window overlooking London's Big Ben instead of Hollywood, as in the American original.

=== The Soup Investigates ===
The Soup Investigates featured most of the same crew, including Joel McHale as the host. In the spin-off, the reporters go looking for potentially funny celebrity news stories. It is a spoof of investigative journalism.

== See also ==
- Harry Hill's TV Burp, a similar show in the UK
