= Jack and Dean of All Trades =

British television series

- Genre: Comedy; Drama
- Created by: Jack Howard; Dean Dobbs
- Written by: Jack Howard; Dean Dobbs; Paul Neafcy
- Directed by: Jack Howard; Matt Holt
- Starring: Jack Howard; Dean Dobbs; Jessica Hynes
- Composer: Benjamin Squires
- Country of origin: United Kingdom
- Original language: English
- No. of seasons: 2
- No. of episodes: 12 (1 special)

Production
- Executive producers: Matthew Harvey; Jay Pond-Jones; Jack Howard; Dean Dobbs
- Producers: Paddy Hughes; Rebecca Hewett
- Cinematography: Ciaran O'Brien
- Editors: Gary Scullion; Jack Howard
- Running time: 10-17 minutes 9 minutes (special)
- Production company: Colour TV

Original release
- Network: Fullscreen
- Release: 18 June 2016 – 25 December 2018

Jack and Dean of All Trades, often shortened to JADOAT, is a British television series created, co-written by, and starring Jack Howard and Dean Dobbs. The series follows fictionalized versions of Howard and Dobbs, who resign from the bank and become temps, taking on a variety of different jobs which all end badly.

The first episode released in 2016. The series has 2 seasons and 12 episodes fully released on Fullscreen as of April 2017. Howard and Dobbs have a YouTube channel, in which they make comedy sketches that often end on a darker note. Both also have their own individual channels. It has been confirmed by Jack that there will not be a third season of JADOAT. However, Jack and Dean were able to reclaim the rights to release the two seasons of the show on their YouTube channel, broadcast through December 2018. This run ended with the premiere of an exclusive final episode on Christmas Day, wrapping up the show without the need for a third season.

== Episodes ==
Every episode is written by Jack Howard, Dean Dobbs, and Paul Neafcy.

Season	Episode number	Episode name	Release date
1	1	Baking Bad	18 June 2016
1	2	Those Who Paint	28 June 2016
1	3	Dad Men	5 July 2016
1	4	Pour & Order	5 July 2016
1	5	The Lying Dead	12 July 2016
1	6	The Bank Job	12 July 2016
2	1	Lifeguards	16 March 2017
2	2	Library	16 March 2017
2	3	Karaoke	23 March 2017
2	4	Costumes	30 March 2017
2	5	Prison	6 April 2017
2	6	Van	13 April 2017
Special	1	The End	25 December 2018

Episode 1x1, Baking Bad, was released on Jack & Dean's YouTube channel, on 24 June 2016, and episode 1x3, Dad Men, was uploaded to their channel, on 21 April 2017. Lifeguards, which is the first episode of season 2, was also uploaded to the channel on 16 March 2017.

In December 2018, following the closure of Fullscreen's on demand video services, all 13 episode of the series were uploaded to the JackAndDean YouTube channel.

== Cast and crew ==
- Creators - Jack Howard, Dean Dobbs
- Directors - Jack Howard, Matt Holt
- Writers - Dean Dobbs, Jack Howard, Paul Neafcy

=== Series cast ===
- Dean Dobbs as Dean (12 episodes, 2016-2017)
- Jack Howard as Jack (12 episodes, 2016-2017)
- Jessica Hynes as Marv (12 episodes, 2016-2017)
- Jessica Mescall as Lottie (6 episodes, 2017)
- Andrea Valls as Emma (4 episodes, 2016-2017)
- Dean Nolan as Burly Guard (2 episodes, 2017)
- Rosie Armstrong as Banker (1 episode, 2016)
- Richard Clark as Bank clerk (1 episode, 2016)
- Matt Holt as Baker on TV (1 episode, 2016)
- Paddy Hughes as Baker on TV (1 episode, 2016)
- Daniel J. Layton as Narrator on TV (1 episode, 2016)
- Fergus March as Baker on TV (1 episode, 2016)
- Paul Neafcy as Angry Queue Guy (1 episode, 2016)
- Colin Burt Vidler as Dad (bank robber) (1 episode, 2016)
- Toby Williams as Bank Manager (1 episode, 2016)
- Kerry Godliman as Ellen (1 episode, 2016)
- Tom Allen as Morgue Attendant (1 episode, 2016)
- Jacob Anderson as Marcus Rose (1 episode, 2016)

== Awards and nominations ==
=== 2015 ===
Nominated Streamy Award	Best International Series

=== 2016 ===
Nominated Streamy Award	Best Actor	Best Direction
Nominated Streamy Award	Dean Dobbs	Jack Howard
Nominated Streamy Award	Dean Dobbs	Matt Holt
