= Manhattan Love Story =

American romantic comedy television series

- Genre: Romantic comedy
- Created by: Jeff Lowell
- Starring: Lio Tipton (Note: Credited as Analeigh Tipton; Tipton came out as non-binary and changed their name in 2021.); Jake McDorman; Nicolas Wright; Jade Catta-Preta; Chloé Wepper; Kurt Fuller
- Theme music composer: Alec Puro
- Country of origin: United States
- Original language: English
- No. of seasons: 1
- No. of episodes: 11 (7 unaired on ABC)

Production
- Executive producers: Jeff Lowell; Jon Liebman; Robin Schwartz; Peter Traugott; Rachel Kaplan; Michael Fresco
- Camera setup: Single-camera
- Running time: 22 minutes
- Production companies: Brillstein Entertainment Partners; Burrow Owl Productions; ABC Studios

Original release
- Network: ABC (episodes 1–4); US VoD (episodes 5–11)
- Release: September 30 – December 4, 2014

Manhattan Love Story is an American romantic comedy television series created by Jeff Lowell, who also served as an executive producer alongside Peter Traugott, Robin Schwartz, Rachel Kaplan, and Jon Liebman for ABC Studios. The series aired on ABC from September 30 to October 21, 2014, airing at 8:30 pm (Eastern). Following modest viewership, the series' cancellation was announced on October 24: the first from network television for the fall schedule and for the 2014–15 season overall.

The series aired online in New Zealand on TVNZ's on-demand service from October 1, 2014, prior to an intended airing on TV2 in 2015. Following the series' cancellation by ABC, TVNZ continued to release the remaining episodes. It was announced on November 25, 2014, that the remaining episodes that were unaired by ABC would be released in the United States on Hulu and WatchABC.com on a weekly basis beginning on December 2, 2014. On December 4, 2014, all seven remaining episodes were released simultaneously on Hulu and WatchABC.com, with non-subscriber availability a week later. As a result, episodes 10 and 11 were released on Hulu before their release on TVNZ OnDemand.

== Synopsis ==
The series chronicles the journey of a new couple and the questions they are thinking from the moment they begin their relationship.

== Cast and characters ==
=== Main ===
- Lio Tipton as Dana Hopkins, a young woman from a small town living in New York, determined to succeed in both business and love
- Jake McDorman as Peter Cooper, a native New Yorker who tends to date his way throughout the city
- Nicolas Wright as David Cooper, Peter's brother and Amy's husband, who loves his wife and money, even if she is the one who must manage it
- Jade Catta-Preta as Amy Cooper, David's wife and Dana's sorority sister
- Chloé Wepper as Chloe Cooper, Peter and David's half-sister
- Kurt Fuller as William Cooper, Peter, David, and Chloe's father, who owns the company at which his children work

=== Recurring ===
- Nico Evers-Swindell as Tucker, Dana's boss at the publishing house she works at as an editor

== Reception ==
Manhattan Love Story received generally negative reviews from critics. Rotten Tomatoes gave the series a rating of 28%, based on 43 reviews, with an average rating of 4.8/10. The site's consensus read, "Saddled with a worn setup and offensively bad jokes, Manhattan Love Story isn't very lovable." Metacritic gave the show a score of 42 out of 100, based on reviews from 24 critics, indicating "mixed or average reviews".

== Episodes ==
No.	Title	Directed by	Written by	Original release date	Prod. code	U.S. viewers (millions)
1	"Pilot"	Michael Fresco	Jeff Lowell	September 30, 2014	101	4.70
New to New York City, Dana encounters purses she wants to buy, co-workers refusing to work with her and a bad blind date. Peter's attitude makes a poor first impression, but given a second chance, they might find something to like about each other.
2	"In the Mix, On the Books, and In the Freezer"	Michael Fresco	Jeff Lowell	October 7, 2014	102	3.03
After seeing Peter on a date with another girl, Dana tries online dating to prove she is not a monogamous kind of girl. Peter's jealousy leads to more awkward run-ins and the pair just might relent to one more date.
3	"Gay or British?"	Peter Lauer	Sue Paige	October 14, 2014	103	2.87
Dana and Peter seem to have reached their perfect relationship balance—they have jointly agreed to see other people but not talk about it. But their dating anonymity is all about to change when Dana learns of a long-standing dinner party Amy is hosting at the loft—and the fact that Peter is attending and bringing someone else as his date.
4	"It's Complicated"	Christine Gernon	Sarah Dunn	October 21, 2014	104	2.62
Dana and Peter continue to enjoy New York and each other, but when they realize they still haven't had sex, both decide to do so following a sexy and swanky dinner at an upscale oyster restaurant. But when the couple finds their reservation is pushed, Dana and Peter head elsewhere, not knowing that their romantic evening is about to go from intimate dinner to disaster. Meanwhile, Amy and David spend an evening babysitting and make a decision that will impact their future forever.
5	"Sex Actually"	Peter Lauer	Leila Strachan	November 5, 2014 (NZ VoD); December 4, 2014 (US VoD)	105	N/A
The topic of Dana and Peter's latest disagreement is the holiday-themed romantic comedy Love Actually, and it could not come at a more inopportune moment.
6	"Empire State of Mind Strikes Back"	Rebecca Asher	Scott King	December 3, 2014 (NZ VoD) (Note: Released as episode 9 on TVNZ OD.); December 4, 2014 (US VoD)	106	N/A
An impending storm is a fitting end to a tough week for Dana until her boss calls with her first book to edit with a quick deadline. But when everyone she knows shows up at the office to wait out the storm, Dana is annoyed by the distraction—then the power goes out.
7	"Love Is a Battlefield"	Fred Goss	Todd Waldman	November 12, 2014 (NZ VoD); December 4, 2014 (US VoD)	107	N/A
Dana is forced to reveal her live action role-playing hobby to Peter when he joins her on what he believes is an out of town work conference. But a supportive Peter eventually misses Dana and decides to join her on the playing field, putting everything she has worked so hard for and loves about the game in jeopardy.
8	"Plus One"	Alex Reid	Sam Laybourne	November 19, 2014 (NZ VoD); December 4, 2014 (US VoD)	108	N/A
When Dana replaces Peter with Tucker as her plus one to an old friend's wedding, Peter quickly realizes that he would rather have a miserable time with Dana than a wonderful time without her. Amy skips her spin class to secretly take dance lessons in preparation for the wedding and David thinks she might be having an affair.
9	"Happy Thanksmas"	John Fortenberry	Jaclyn Moore	November 26, 2014 (NZ VoD); December 4, 2014 (US VoD)	109	N/A
Peter is embarrassed by his family and doesn't invite Dana to Thanksgiving, but when Dana's flight home suddenly gets cancelled, she ends up in the middle of Peter's horrible family Thanksmas tradition and is determined to turn things around and have fun.
10	"The Ex Factor"	John Fortenberry	Daniel Paige	December 4, 2014 (US VoD)	110	N/A
When Peter learns that Dana is still friends with all of her exes, even the one who proposed, he takes her cue and tries to reconnect with his one long term girlfriend. Plus, there is conflict at Cooper and Sons when Amy fills in for the receptionist and tries to tell everyone how to do their job.
11	"Let It Go"	John Fortenberry	Jameel Saleem	December 4, 2014 (US VoD)	111	N/A
When Dana's ex-boyfriend shows up in New York to win her back, Peter does everything he can to show Dana how much he cares, even letting her go if that's what it takes. David helps Chloe get out of her dating slump by showing her how to use the Cooper family secret dating trophy.

== International broadcast ==
In New Zealand, the series was released online on TVNZ OnDemand, starting October 1, 2014, which included the episodes unaired by ABC. The release of episodes 5 through 9 was the first public release of the episodes.

The show began airing in Spain on November 23, 2014.

The show began airing Sunday nights on Sony Channel (Asia) on October 19, 2014.

M-Net has also aired the show in Africa.

In Australia, the series premiered from August 26, 2015, on the Seven Network at 1:30am.

In India, the Murdoch-owned Star World channel premiered the show for weekday runs starting 13 October 2015, sandwiched between Modern Family (reruns) and latest season of Masterchef Australia in primetime.
