= Oops TV =

- Narrated by: Justin Lee Collins
- Country of origin: United Kingdom
- Original language: English
- No. of series: 2
- No. of episodes: 107

Original release
- Network: Sky 1
- Release: 16 February 2009 – 22 November 2010

Oops TV is a British television programme which features comedic video clips of people and animals, broadcast between February 2009 and November 2010, hosted and narrated by Justin Lee Collins.
