= Carol McGiffin =

English radio, TV presenter (born 1960)

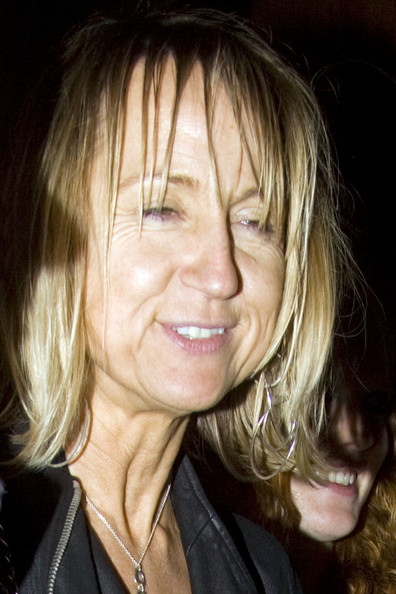
- Born: Carol Deirdre McGiffin; 18 February 1960 (age 66); London, England
- Occupations: Television and radio presenter
- Years active: 1988–present
- Employer: Best magazine
- Television: Loose Women (2000–2013, 2018–2023)
- Spouses: Chris Evans (m. 1991; div. 1998); Mark Cassidy (m. 2018)

Carol Deirdre McGiffin (born 18 February 1960) is an English conspiracy theorist, antivax activist, radio and television broadcaster, who appeared on the daytime talk show Loose Women from 2000 until her first departure in 2013 and again from 2018 until 2023. McGiffin appeared on the twelfth series of Celebrity Big Brother. She is a weekly contributor to Best magazine.

== Early life ==
Carol Deirdre McGiffin was born on 18 February 1960 in London and brought up in Maidstone, Kent, to John McGiffin and Heather Barham. She grew up with her two sisters and a brother.

== Career ==
She started her broadcasting career in 1984 as a producer on cable channel Music Box and moved on to presenting in 1988 as co-host of the Chris Evans shows on GLR. Her style then and characterised today is based on comedic observation of men.

In 1995, McGiffin was a founding member of the Talk Radio UK team, co-presenting the popular weekday evening show The Rude Awakening with Moz Dee. When the show ended in September 1995, she became the station's music expert for around six months, hosting her own Friday evening review slot and appearing every week on Jonathan King's programme. In late 1996, she reappeared on Liberty Radio, co-hosting the breakfast show with Richard Skinner for six months. In 1997 and 1998, she returned to Talk Radio to present the breakfast show alongside Paul Ross, who had previously presented it alone. She also co-presented the station's Saturday afternoon programme with Nick Abbot during the summer when the football coverage was being rested.

When Kirsty Young and Bill Overton became hosts of The New Talk Radio Breakfast, Ross and McGiffin moved to weekend breakfast, where they stayed until a consortium led by Kelvin MacKenzie bought the station in 1998. McGiffin was sacked by Mike Parry, and Ross continued to host the Sunday morning programme on the station alongside new co-host Helen Gibson.

In 1999, she joined London radio station LBC, teaming up again with Abbot, who left the station after six months. McGiffin continued to host the show on her own with producer/sidekicks, including Marcus Railton and Jonathan Sanchez, until 30 September 2000. She co-hosted phone-in shows on BBC London Live. In 2002, she occasionally teamed up with Abbot on Real Radio.

Between February and July 2006, she was the southern presenter of The Local Radio Company's night-time talk show North South Divided. Mike Elliott was her northern counterpart. In August 2006, McGiffin returned to LBC 97.3 presenting a Sunday morning show. McGiffin's weekly views on the world and travel advice in her Travel Clinic ended on 10 February 2008, when she left the station. Throughout the summer of 2012, she regularly reviewed the daily newspapers on This Morning. In August 2013, she entered the Celebrity Big Brother house to compete in the twelfth series; she finished in fourth place.

In June 2018, it was announced by panellist Denise Welch that McGiffin would be returning to Loose Women after five years away.

In 2020, McGiffin teamed up with LBC Radio presenter Nick Abbot to create a weekly podcast, "What's Your Problem?" with Nick and Carol. The show is released every Monday on Global Player and Apple Podcasts.

That same year, McGiffin said she supported Donald Trump and would vote for him if she could.

In 2021, she was criticised for voicing support for the January 6 rioters. In 2023, she felt compelled to resign from ITV's Loose Women. McGiffin has spoken out on a variety of controversial topics; in 2025, when appearing on the Heretics podcast (hosted by Andrew Gold), she said "I've never believed in, landing. . . on the moon". She also expressed her doubts on the extent of the COVID-19 pandemic lockdown measures.

=== Television ===
- Loose Women (2000–2001, 2003–2013, 2018–2023) – regular panellist
- Daily Cooks Challenge
- Who Wants to Be a Millionaire? – contestant (2007)
- Tonight with Trevor McDonald
- Ant & Dec's Saturday Night Takeaway
- The Paul O'Grady Show – guest
- The Jack Docherty Show
- 8 Out of 10 Cats – panellist
- Friday Night with Jonathan Ross
- Celebrity Juice – panellist
- The Justin Lee Collins Show
- The Wright Stuff (2014)
- OK! TV
- Pointless – contestant
- This Morning (2012, 2016) – newspaper reviewer
- Celebrity Big Brother (Summer 2013) – housemate
- Celebrity Big Brother's Bit on the Side (Summer 2013) – guest
- Celebrity Big Brother's Bit on the Psych (Winter 2014) – panellist

== Personal life ==
McGiffin is a survivor of the 2004 Indian Ocean earthquake. For several years, she has returned to Maidstone to join members of her family and take part in Race for Life to raise money for the charity Cancer Research UK, she does this in memory of her mother.

== Autobiography ==
In 2010, McGiffin released her autobiography, Oh, Carol!.
