= Flipside TV =

Flipside TV is a television programme broadcast by Channel 4, Nation 277 and Paramount Comedy in the United Kingdom, which aired from 2003 to 2004. It was presented mainly by Richard Bacon (also the show's founder, and executive producer) and guest hosts, including Justin Lee Collins and Iain Lee. It was directed by Brendan Sheppard. The format was created by David Owen and Jay Pond-Jones based on an original idea by Chas Bayfield, which had been posted on the free ideas website Idea a Day.

The show was broadcast live and included a presenter and three guests, each with their own television and digital satellite receiver. The guests would "flip" through the many hundreds of satellite channels looking for something interesting. If something interesting was found, whatever it was then broadcast live on the show with the guests providing their own mainly comic commentary. Before its disappearance, Flipside TV had a daily slot for two weeks on Channel 4, where it was normally broadcast between midnight and 2 am, and a ten-week slot on Paramount.

== Regular guests and presenters ==
- Iain Lee
- Richard Bacon
- Justin Lee Collins
- Michael Holden
- Sam Delaney
- Boyd Hilton
- James Brown
- Caroline Ashton
- Karl Pilkington
- Ed Hall
- Alan Carr
- Elaine

Directed by

- Brendan Sheppard

Produced by

- David Evans
- Peter Wood (Series Director)
- Victor Ebuwa
