= Sunday Night Show =

The Sunday Night Show with Iain Lee
- Running time: 3 hours
- Country of origin: United Kingdom
- Language: English
- Home station: Absolute Radio
- Hosted by: Iain Lee
- Starring: Iain Lee
- Produced by: David "Davis" Lambert; Eloise Carr
- Recording studio: No. 1, Golden Square, London
- Original release: 6 January 2008 – 13 September 2009
- Audio format: Stereophonic sound
- Website: Official Absolute Radio Page
- Podcast: Official Absolute Radio Podcast Link

The Sunday Night Show with Iain Lee was a Sony Award Silver-winning weekly radio show broadcast on Absolute Radio, between 10 pm on Sunday and 1 am on Monday, hosted by Iain Lee and produced by Eloise Carr, formerly by Dave "Davis" Lambert. The format of the show was primarily phone-in based, with callers discussing the pre-set topics of the evening, or to discuss topics that they themselves introduce. The show is notable for allowing calls to be aired unscreened for the last half-hour of the show, in a segment called "MMM" (or Triple M), which is similar in format to The Human Zoo. As well as talk, records are sparsely played throughout the show (approximately 4 to 5 records per hour) due to Absolute Radio's license as a music station. The show ended in September 2009, and was replaced a month later by Iain Lee's 2 Hour Long Late Night Radio Show on the same station.

== Origins ==
The Sunday Night Show was similar in format to Iain Lee's Good Evening, which was broadcast on LBC until November 2007. Unlike Lee's previous show, it was only broadcast one night a week as a niche show, as it was the only predominantly phone-in show broadcast on Absolute. The show featured some continuity from the LBC days, with callers from the previous station contributing similar output on the new show, for instance Barry from Watford.

== Regular features ==
The Sunday Night Show had several regular features including "Answerphone Messages", where best bits of messages left during the week on the answerphone were played and "Triple M", the part of the show (broadcast at approximately 12.30 am) when calls went straight to air with no screening. However, as this may lead to inappropriate utterances from callers, the show was broadcast with a seven-second delay.

"Win Win or Lose" was a former feature where Lee gives away items he has received that week. Occasionally, he has given away other items as prizes, e.g. unwanted presents from relatives. The feature was not strictly speaking a competition but a game of chance – the only criterion needed to win was to be on hold on the right line(s) when the feature was played. The format has recently been changed to allow more than one person to play, however there is still no element of competition – if two callers partake, then the "winners" split the items equally, and may have been given the chance to swap prizes on air.

The "Col-Lee-Seum" (conceived by XTC guitarist Andy Partridge) was a feature when two listeners both argue separate issues. Following this the first five people to call in and vote for one of the contestants meant that contestant wins. Although the game was meant to be serious, due to the contestants and issues chosen, for instance chocolate or vanilla, the feature normally became a rabble.
