= FAQ U =

FAQ U is a television programme that was broadcast by Channel 4 in the United Kingdom in 2005. It was shown every weeknight, Monday to Friday, just after 11:00 pm. It was presented by Justin Lee Collins in its first week, David Mitchell in the second and Karen Taylor in the third. It included four comedian guests and an audience. The presenter put "frequently asked questions" to the guests and they answered them in a humorous way. The show's title was frequently pronounced by the presenter as "Fak You".

Mitchell received a nomination from The British Comedy Awards at the end of 2005. The show was produced by the company Endemol. Each episode was filmed the day it is aired in front of a live audience. 400,000 people watched the show's premiere.

== Guests ==
Guests included:

- Matt Blaize
- Elizabeth Bower
- Frankie Boyle
- Ruth Bratt
- Alan Carr
- Paul Foot
- Cherry Green
- Iain Lee
- Alex Lovell
- Henning Wehn
- Alex Zane

== Reception ==
The Lancashire Telegraph criticised the show, writing, "Panel of irreverent comedians discuss the day's news. More like irrelevant comedians – this is dire." Charlie Courtauld of The Independent penned a negative review of FAQ, saying that it "takes an untalented host, Justin Lee Collins, and provides him with a ghastly car-crash of a jokey script". In a positive review, the Sunday Mirror's Ian Hyland wrote, "the host Justin Lee Collins has more in common with Jethro than simply having a silly beard and being from the West Country. He's as funny as him as well."

The Evening Chronicle television critic Jamie Diffley criticized FAQ U, stating, "The idea is to get 'top comedians' to talk on topical subjects. A bit like Have I Got News For You without the actual quiz show bit. Or the laughs." Teddy Jamieson of The Herald agreed, calling it a "frankly dreadful" show that is an "uninspired offcut" of Have I Got News For You.
