= Justin Lee Collins =

British presenter and actor

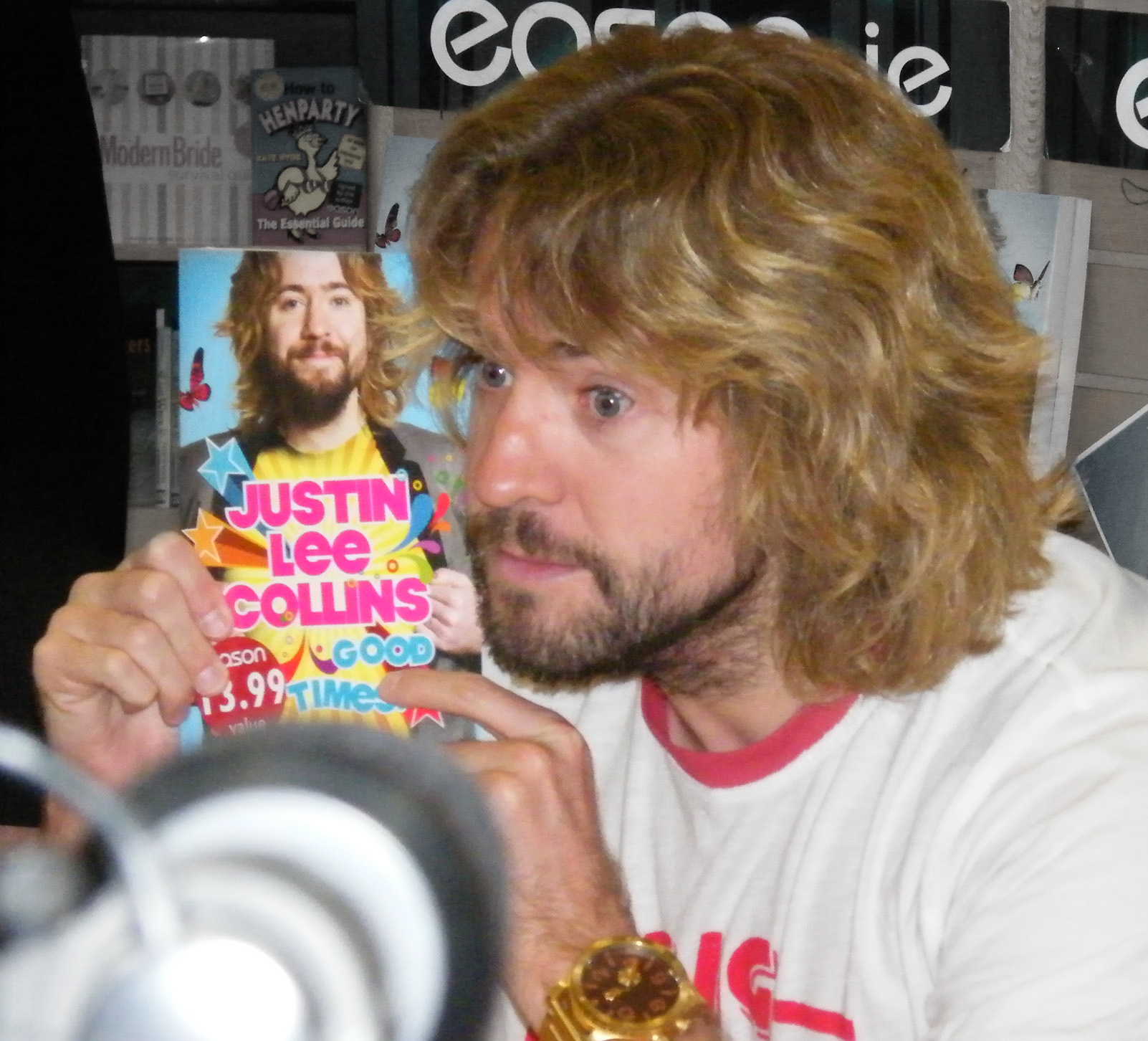
- Collins signing autobiography Goodtimes
- Born: 28 July 1974 (age 52); Bristol, England
- Notable work: FAQ U The Convention Crasher; The Friday Night Project; Bring Back... The Justin Lee Collins Show; Heads or Tails; Good Times; Turning Japanese
- Spouse: Karen Lee Collins (m. 2003; separated 2010)
- Children: 4

Comedy career
- Years active: 1997–2016
- Medium: Radio, television, stand-up, music
- Genres: Observational comedy, surreal humour, slapstick
- Subjects: Celebrities, pop culture

Justin Lee Collins (born 28th July 1974) is an English former actor and radio and television presenter from Bristol.

Collins began his career as a comedian in the 1990s when he was in his late teens. He then presented a number of UK TV shows. From 2003 to 2005, he hosted his own radio show on XFM. He was one of the duo presenting The Sunday Night Project (previously named The Friday Night Project), appearing alongside Alan Carr for Channel 4. He also hosted numerous specials on Channel 4 entitled 'Bring Back...', reuniting the cast and crew from shows and films such as Dallas, Star Wars, The A-Team, and Fame.

In 2012, he was convicted of harassing ex-girlfriend, Anna Larke. Subsequently, he lost several television contracts, leading to a career hiatus.

In 2014, Collins tried to return to UK screens, starring in the comedy horror feature film The Hatching alongside Thomas Turgoose and Andrew Potts. In 2015, he played a small role in the time-travel comedy Time Slips. He hosted an independent radio show on Fubar Radio until 2016, then presented the short lived football-themed magazine show, FanTV UK.

== Early life ==
Collins was born in 1974 in Bristol to Anita and Danny Collins. His father was a self-employed electrician. Collins is an only child. In 1990, he left Speedwell Secondary School aged 15 with no qualifications and started a course at Filton college. He later worked at Marks & Spencer as a warehouseman.

== Career ==
=== Comedy and theatre ===
Collins began his career in entertainment as a stand-up comic whilst still working part-time as a double-glazing window demonstrator. He won the Best New Comedy Act award at the Glastonbury Festival in 1997 and reached the finals of the BBC New Comedy Awards at the Edinburgh Fringe Festival the same year. Collins gave up stand-up comedy in 2002 to concentrate on TV and radio presenting, stating he intended to never return to the profession.

In 2007 and 2010, Collins won the category Funniest Man at the Loaded Lafta Awards.

In 2008, Collins appeared as Amos Hart in the hit show Chicago, for which he rehearsed at the Cambridge Theatre. Collins said of the role, "I'm over the moon to be playing the sexiest part in the best show on the West End stage. I've already gone through a dozen pairs of tights."

From August 2011 to September 2012, Collins played Dennis Dupree in the West End production of Rock of Ages.

In 2013, Collins made a one-night-only return to stand-up comedy when he participated in "What's the Fuss?", an event organised by Helen Lederer.

=== Radio ===
Collins began hosting a radio show on XFM in 2003, initially on Sundays at 1 to 3 am, later progressing to Saturday afternoons from 3 to 6 pm. He left in December 2005 and returned to host the Saturday 2 to 6 pm slot during April 2011. On 17 September that year, Collins sat in for Dermot O'Leary's Saturday show on BBC Radio 2. Collins was heard performing a Tom Jones impersonation on BBC Radio 1's Chris Moyles show in January 2008.

In 2014, Collins returned to radio with his own weekly show on Fubar Radio, an uncensored station featuring Andy Parsons and Mark Dolan. The show is also available via iTunes in podcast form.

=== Television and film ===
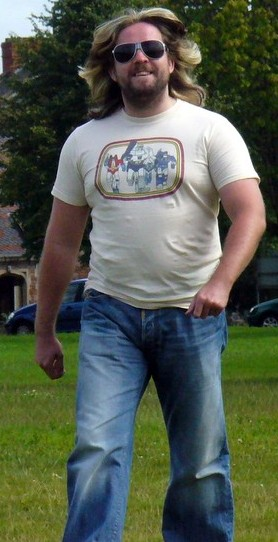
Collins in 2007

In 2002, Collins made shows for Bravo and MTV and became the host of the companion show for the first series of Strictly Come Dancing. He was replaced by Claudia Winkleman the following year and the show moved from BBC Three to BBC Two.

In 2005 and 2006, Collins presented The Games: Live at Trackside on E4 alongside Caroline Flack. The series was the companion show to Channel 4's sports-based reality programme The Games.

He was one of the presenters of Channel 4 and Paramount's Flipside TV.

He fronted a series for Channel 4 entitled The Convention-Crasher, aired in late 2007 and early 2008, in which he learned skills such as clowning and ventriloquism in an attempt to win prizes at professional conventions.

On 7 May 2007, he was a guest presenter on The New Paul O'Grady Show on Channel 4 when O'Grady took a break. Collins appeared on Top Gear with Alan Carr on 22 June 2008, for the Star in a Reasonably-Priced Car segment.

In June 2008, a show was aired on Sky One entitled Justin Lee Collins: 180, which followed his quest to be a professional darts player. In the show, he practised with Keith Deller and played in the BDO International Open on 15 June 2008. He lost in the first round 3–0 in legs to county player Stuart Bousfield, who was in the top 100 in the BDO rankings at the time.

He signed a £3 million deal with ITV for a show which focused on topical issues, but with a comedic twist, titled The Justin Lee Collins Show on ITV2 which ran from March to May 2009. That year he became the host of the Sky One show Oops TV, which features comedic video clips. That August he appeared on JLC Is, a six-part series on Sky One depicting the comedian taking on challenges to become a Mexican wrestler, a surfer, a ballroom dancer, a ten-pin bowler, a high diver and a West End star. The following month on 11 September, whilst being interviewed on BBC Radio 1's Chris Moyles Show it was announced Collins had signed an exclusive deal with Channel 5, and he confirmed he would therefore not be making another series of The Justin Lee Collins Show for ITV2. On joining Five he hosted the game show Heads Or Tails, where players could win up to £1m by correctly calling coin flips, and a chat show called Good Times which was cancelled due to poor viewing figures.

In Justin Lee Collins: The Wrestler, Collins trains for 10 days in Mexico with a Mexican Luchador (Mexican wrestler) who fights under the name Cassandro, as an exotico. Collins adopts a rudo (bad guy) Luchador persona, El Glorioso, or the Glorious Lee One, with his own wrestling mask. His persona is given the blessing of El Hijo del Santo (The Son of Saint). Returning to London, Collins fights Cassan Dro in a Lucha libre event in the Roundhouse, ultimately losing and being unmasked.

In 2014, Collins was cast in British feature film The Hatching as Stan. It was directed by Michael Anderson. Collins stars alongside Andrew Potts and Thomas Turgoose. The following year he had a bit part in time-travel comedy Time Slips, directed by Stephen Hyams.

In August 2016, Collins made a return to TV, four years after his conviction, becoming a regular presenter on FanTV. The show attracted a small audience and was cancelled a few months later.

=== Music ===
After failing to be chosen to represent the United Kingdom in the 2010 Eurovision Song Contest, on 22 January 2010, Collins announced on RTÉ's The Late Late Show his intention to seek the nomination to represent Ireland. His proposed song was written by Boyzone star Ronan Keating. RTÉ confirmed on 9 February 2010 the song had not been shortlisted for the Irish final.

In 2007, Collins signed a three-album deal with Universal. Because of other commitments the first album (titled Another Side) was never released and subsequently the deal was called off. Collins stated in an interview with Reveal magazine (2012) that he would like to resume his efforts to release music in the future.

=== Writing ===
In September 2009, Collins' autobiography Good Times! was published by Ebury Press. An audiobook followed.

== Personal life ==
=== Marriage and children ===
In 2003, Collins married Karen Lee. She gave birth to their first child, a boy, in May 2005. In January 2008, Collins announced his wife had recently given birth to their second son. Collins separated from his wife in late 2010.

=== Harassment conviction ===
In November 2010, Collins began a relationship with Anna Larke. After their break-up, Collins was charged with harassment of Larke under Section 4 of the Protection from Harassment Act 1997 (harassment causing fear of violence), and was subsequently tried at St Albans Crown Court, where he was sentenced to 140 hours of community service and to pay £3,500 prosecution costs.

Following the trial he sought help from a psychotherapist.

=== Libel lawsuit ===
In 2017, Collins successfully sued British tabloid The Sun for £50,000 when they falsely reported that he had been dismissed from FUBAR Radio for sexism.

== Television credits ==
- The E4 Daily (E4)
- Pirate TV (Meridian Broadcasting)
- MTV Hot (MTV)
- Brain Candy (BBC Choice)
- 10 Things You Didn't Know About... (Bravo)
- Britain vs The World (Bravo)
- MTV Premieres (MTV)
- Flipside TV (2003) (Nation 217/Paramount Comedy 1/Channel 4)
- Bring Back Grange Hill (2005) (Channel 4)
- Destination Three (2005) (BBC Three)
- The Games: Live at Trackside (2005) (E4)
- Generation Jedi (2005) (BBC Three)
- FAQ U (2005) (Channel 4)
- Bring Back...The Christmas Number One (2005) (Channel 4)
- The Friday Night Project (2006–2008) (Channel 4)
- Bring Back... The A-Team (2006) (Channel 4)
- Bring Back... One Hit Wonders (2006) (Channel 4)
- Law of the Playground (2006) (Channel 4)
- The Convention Crasher (2007, 2008) (Channel 4)
- The New Paul Lee O'Grady Show (2007) Guest Presenter (Channel 4)
- Bring Back... Dallas (2007) (Channel 4)
- First & Last (2007) Presenter (Channel 4)
- The Sunday Night Project (2008–2009) (Channel 4)
- Justin Lee Collins 180 (2008) Presenter (Sky One)
- Bring Back... Star Wars (2008) (Channel 4)
- Bring Back... Fame (2008) (Channel 4)
- Oops TV (2009) (Sky1)
- The Justin Lee Collins Show (2009) (ITV2)
- Bring Back...Star Trek (2009) (Channel 4)
- Justin Lee Collins: The Wrestler (2009) (Sky1)
- Justin Lee Collins: High Diver (2009) (Sky1)
- Justin Lee Collins: West End Star (2009) (Sky1)
- Justin Lee Collins: Ballroom Dancer (2009) (Sky1)
- Justin Lee Collins: Surfer (2009) (Sky1)
- Justin Lee Collins: Ten Pin Bowler (2009) (Sky1)
- Heads or Tails (2009) (Five)
- Justin Lee Collins: Good Times (2010) (Five)
- Eurovision: A Song For Justin (2010) (Five)
- Justin Lee Collins: Turning Japanese (2011) (Channel 5)
- JLC Vs. Steven Lee Seagal (2011) (Channel 5)
- Justin Lee Collins: Living Las Vegas (2011) (Channel 5)
- Sooty: The Great Race (2011) (CITV)
