= Web Soup =

- Genre: Infotainment
- Presented by: Chris Hardwick
- Country of origin: United States
- Original language: English
- No. of seasons: 3
- No. of episodes: 53

Production
- Executive producer: Brad Stevens
- Running time: 22 minutes

Original release
- Network: G4
- Release: June 7, 2009 – July 20, 2011

Related
- The Soup; The Dish; Sports Soup

Web Soup is an American weekly infotainment series that aired on the G4 cable network. The show premiered on June 7, 2009, and was hosted by Chris Hardwick. The series focused on commenting on the latest viral videos, and had a very similar style as its sister network E!'s series The Soup.

During the first two seasons, this show was taped in front of a green screen like The Soup. In the third season, the program taped on the set usually utilized by E! News with added studio audience seating. Chris Hardwick confirmed via a comment on his website that season three was the last and the show would not continue. However, repackaged archived episodes returned to G4's schedule from December 2012 until the network's closure on December 31, 2014.
