= FUBAR Radio =

British internet radio station

- United Kingdom

History
- First air date: March 2014

Links
- Website: fubarradio.com

FUBAR Radio is an internet radio station based in the United Kingdom.

== History ==
FUBAR received £125,000 from the Early Advantage Fund, managed by Midven on behalf of the Department for Business, Innovation and Skills and the European Regional Development Fund, intended to kick-start businesses in the West Midlands.

== Notable former presenters ==
- James Acaster
- Ian Boldsworth
- Justin Lee Collins
- Mark Dolan
- Jon Gaunt
- Ed Gamble
- Nick Helm
- Richard Herring
- Sean Hughes
- Calum McSwiggan
- Andy Parsons
- Katie Price
- Lou Sanders
- JaackMaate
