= Glenn Gretlund =

Danish record producer (born 1977)

- Glenn Gretlund in 2026
- Born: Glenn Nordby Gretlund; 2 May 1977 (age 49); Aarhus, Denmark
- Occupations: Record company owner, record producer
- Years active: 1997–present
- Spouse: Usha Tine Gretlund (m. 2009)

Glenn Gretlund (born Glenn Nordby Gretlund; 2 May 1977) is a London-based record company executive and record producer. He is currently a director and shareholder of British music labels Not Now Music Ltd and 7a Records.

== Early life ==
Gretlund was born in Aarhus, Denmark, the son of Hanne Skovgaard Gretlund and Jan Nordby Gretlund. He spent most of his childhood in Odense, attended Munkebjergskolen primary/secondary school and graduated from Tornbjerg College in 1996. He was then drafted into the Royal Danish Army, undergoing six months' army and firefighter training on the remote Danish Island of Bornholm as part of the country's national service programme.

== Music business ==
Gretlund moved to London in 1997 to work in the music business and landed a job as product and marketing manager in the music department of Prism Leisure Corporation. During his decade at Prism, Gretlund oversaw the production and helped release an estimated 900 albums and a range of music DVDs. He left the company to help set up Not Now Music in 2006; Prism ceased trading six months after his departure.

== Not Now Music ==
He helped Trevor Reidy and Simon Checketts launch Not Now Music in December 2006, compiling and reissuing ranges of 2- and 3-CD sets of historic material that found a market in both the UK and abroad. Gretlund was later made a director and shareholder.

To date, Not Now is believed to have issued around 3,000 music titles on CD and Vinyl, rock, blues, jazz and pop being the main musical genres. After more than six years in Neasden, the label moved to new premises in Golders Green, north London in 2018.

== 7A Records ==
Gretlund set up 7A Records with radio and television broadcaster Iain Lee in 2015. The label initially specialised in reissuing rare releases connected to 1960s group the Monkees. In July 2015, it was announced that the label's first release would be a limited gatefold vinyl edition of Micky Dolenz's original MGM Records singles. This was followed by the first ever reissue of Bobby Hart's solo album, The First Bobby Hart Solo Album in December 2015. In November 2017 the label released the critically acclaimed album, Micky Dolenz's Out Of Nowhere, featuring the 30 piece American Metropole Orchestra. 7A Records' biggest release to date came in 2018 with Michael Nesmith & The First National Band Redux - Live At The Troubadour which gave the label widespread recognition. Michael Nesmith was quoted saying that the album is the best he has ever done. In 2020, 7a Records announced on social media that Glenn Gretlund had bought Iain Lee's shares in the company. In August 2020, Rolling Stone Magazine reported that Gretlund and 7A Records had signed a new recording deal with Micky Dolenz for an album called 'Dolenz Sings Nesmith' The album was released in May 2021 and received international critical acclaim, including a 4 star review in Mojo Magazine. In November 2022 Gretlund announced that he had licensed American singer Macy Gray's album Stripped for release in early 2023. The reissue of Stripped received very positive press, including a glowing review in Goldmine Magazine. Also in 2023, Gretlund was executive-producer on Micky Dolenz's latest EP, "Dolenz Sings R.E.M., which received much publicity and widespread critical acclaim, including praise from R.E.M. with lead-singer Michael Stipe commenting that "The songs are absolutely amazing" and that "I am finally Complete". The single from the EP, "Shiny Happy People", reached number 12 in the UK's Official Physical Singles Chart.

== Personal life ==
He has been married to Usha Tine Gretlund since 2009, with whom he has two daughters.

== Selected discography ==
- 1998 Lead Belly - Midnight Special (PLATCD290)
- 2000 Jerry Lee Lewis - Great Balls Of Fire (PLATCD512)
- 2003 Santana - Magic Rhythms (PLATBX2219)
- 2003 The Yardbirds - Five Live Yardbirds (PLATCD533)
- 2003 Joan Armatrading - Lover's Speak (PLATCD1314)
- 2004 Deep Purple - The Family & Friends Album (PLATBX2253)
- 2004 YES - The Collection (PLATBX2254)
- 2006 Johnny Kidd & the Pirates (The Pirates) - Skullduggery (PLATCD1413)
- 2008 Bob Marley - A Legend (NOT3CD002)
- 2011 Ray Charles - Very Best Of (NOT2CD392)
- 2011 Johnny Cash - Ride This Train (NOT2CD388)
- 2011 The Songs Of Carole King (NOT3CD092)
- 2012 Cat Stevens - Majikat (VV2LP010)
- 2012 Iggy Pop - Rock Action (VV2LP002)
- 2012 The Who - Live At Isle of Wight 1970 (VV3LP006)
- 2013 Nina Simone - Forbidden Fruit / Sings Ellington (NOT2CD473)
- 2014 Bob Dylan - Mono & Stereo Versions (NOT2CD484)
- 2014 10CC - Sheet Music (BADLP004)
- 2015 The Zombies - She's Not There (BAD7005)
- 2015 Genesis - From Genesis To Revelation (BADBX005)
- 2015 The Move - Live At Fillmore '69 (BADLP205)
- 2015 Bobby Hart - The First Bobby Hart Solo Album (7A002)
- 2016 The Zombies - The Zombies (Mono Edition) (BADLP013)
- 2016 Micky Dolenz - "Chance Of A Lifetime" / "Livin' on Lies" (7A003)
- 2016 Peter Noone & Micky Dolenz - An Evening With (7A004)
- 2016 Various Artists - Northern Soul All Nighter (DAY3CD090)
- 2016 Various Artists - Let's Have A Party (NOT3CD216)
- 2016 Micky Dolenz - The MGM Singles Collection (7A005)
- 2016 Micky Dolenz, Christian Nesmith & Circe Link - Porpoise Song EP (7A006)
- 2016 Micky Dolenz - "Sunny Girlfriend" / "Zor And Zam" (7A007)
- 2016 Bob Marley - Sun Is Shining (NOT3LP323)
- 2017 The Zombies - Time Of The Season (BAD2LP206)
- 2017 Davy Jones - "Daydream Believer" / "I Wanna Be Free" (7A011)
- 2017 Michael Nesmith - At The BBC Paris Theatre (7A013)
- 2017 Micky Dolenz - Out Of Nowhere (7A014)
- 2018 Lee "Scratch" Perry - Soul On Fire (NOT2LP256)
- 2018 Iggy Pop - 1977 (NOTLP265)
- 2018 Lou Reed - Rock 'N' Roll (NOTLP264)
- 2018 Davy Jones - "Rainbows" / "You Don't Have To Be A Country Boy To Sing A Country Song" (7A017)
- 2018 The Zombies - Odessey & Oracle (NOTLP263P)
- 2018 Michael Nesmith & The First National Band Redux - Live At The Troubadour (7A022)
- 2018 Imani Coppola - Unsung (7A019)
- 2019 Johnny Cash - Blood, Sweat and Tears (NOT2CD735)
- 2019 Frank Sidebottom - Being Frank - The Chris Sievey Story (7A023)
- 2019 Davy Jones - Live In Japan (7A018)
- 2019 Michael Nesmith & Red Rhodes - Cosmic Partners - The McCabe's Tapes (7A025CD)
- 2020 Micky Dolenz - Live In Japan (7A009)
- 2020 Peter Tork - Stranger Things Have Happened (7A020)
- 2021 Micky Dolenz - Dolenz Sings Nesmith (7A033)
- 2022 Michael Nesmith - And The Hits Just Keep On Comin' (7A041)
- 2022 Michael Nesmith & The Second National Band - Tantamount To Treason Volume One (7A039)
- 2022 Davy Jones - Manchester Boy - Personal File (7A043)
- 2023 Michael Nesmith - Pretty Much Your Standard Ranch Stash (7A052)
- 2023 Macy Gray - Stripped (7A054)
- 2023 Paul Young - The Crossing (30th Anniversary Edition (7A051LP)
- 2023 Dave Edmunds - Repeat When Necessary (7A062LP)
- 2023 Dave Edmunds - Tracks On Wax 4 (7A063LP)
- 2023 Micky Dolenz - Dolenz Sings R.E.M. (7A061EP)
- 2024 Davy Jones - The Bell Records Story (7A056)
- 2024 Mungo Jerry - Electronically Tested (7A066)
- 2025 Mungo Jerry - Snakebite Revisited (7A070)
- 2025 Davy Jones - Music And Memories - The MGM Recordings (7A072)
- 2026 Mungo Jerry - Undefinable (7A074)
