= Nick Abbot =

English radio presenter (born 1960)

- Born: 22 August 1960 (age 66)
- Presenting career
- Show: The Late Show
- Station: LBC
- Time slot: 22:00 – 01:00 GMT / BST; Friday, Saturday and Sunday (10:00pm to 1:00am)
- Style: Talk radio/phone-in
- Country: United Kingdom
- Previous shows: 102.2 Smooth FM; Real Radio; Talk Radio UK; Virgin 1215; BBC GLR; Radio Luxembourg; Eagle Radio

Nick Abbot (born 22 August 1960) is an English radio presenter and currently presents The Late Show on Friday, Saturday and Sunday on LBC.

== Early life and career ==
Abbot was born on 22 August 1960, and was educated at George Heriot's School, a private school for boys in Edinburgh, and at Brunel University of London (BUL) in London, where he gained a lower-second class degree in psychology. His professional career began as a Virgin Megastores DJ. He had previously presented student radio at Brunel University of London's radio station, Brunel University of London.

In early 1987, he joined Radio Luxembourg to present an overnight music show. After hearing American talk show presenter Neil Rogers, Abbot was inspired and the show instead became a phone in.

In October 1988, Abbot launched the new BBC radio station for London, BBC GLR (Greater London Radio). He presented the breakfast show for a year, but his contract was not renewed. He then returned to VMR, where he stayed until 1993.

== Radio career in the 1990s ==
=== Virgin Radio ===
Abbot was part of the original line-up on Virgin Radio in April 1993. There he presented the weekday late night phone-in show Sunday–Thursday from 10 pm to 2 am.

Following a negative newspaper review by writer Robin Katz, Abbot's outbursts on-air eventually led to a censure from the Broadcasting Complaints Commission and the Radio Authority. In June 1994, Abbot was moved to the weekday 7 – 10 pm show.

In January 1995, he moved back to the weekday late night show (this time from 11 pm to 2 am) where he remained until April that year when he was moved to the drivetime show (4 – 7 pm) until he was dismissed from the station in September that year.

=== Talk Radio UK ===
In the summer of 1996, Abbot was heard on Talk Radio UK acting as holiday cover. He was subsequently offered a regular show during the summer of 1997 on Saturday afternoons, alongside Carol McGiffin, later moving to Saturday evenings from 7:30 pm to 10 pm.

=== Return to Virgin ===
It was during this period that Virgin Radio's new management re-hired Abbot to cover various shows on the station. He took over the evening show for six weeks during the summer of 1997, as well as providing holiday cover. In early 1998, he took over the weekday afternoon show on Virgin Radio from 1 pm to 4 pm, while continuing with his Saturday evening show on Talk Radio UK. In May 1998 (while still presenting his daily show on Virgin Radio) he took over the weekday evening show on Talk Radio UK from 7 pm to 9 pm.

In November 1998 Talk Radio UK was taken over by new management, headed by Kelvin MacKenzie, and a number of presenters and staff, including Abbot, were fired. Abbot continued with his weekday show on Virgin Radio, which was extended to six days a week.

=== LBC ===
Between March and September 1999, long-established London station LBC hired Abbot and McGiffin for a Saturday evening phone-in, similar in format to the duo's earlier Talk Radio UK show. During this time, he continued working for Virgin Radio as a DJ. Throughout the summer of 2000, he presented a Sunday morning phone-in show on Virgin, also hosting the weekday afternoon show. Later that year he moved to the drivetime slot, until leaving Virgin once again, in May 2001. He also provided holiday cover for Chris Evans.

=== Real Radio ===
In late 2001, Abbot joined Heart South Wales to host its late-night phone-in show for a week as holiday cover for regular presenter Adrian Allen. October 2001 saw the beginning of a five-day stint at Manchester's Hits Radio Manchester, during which he presented the 10 pm – 2 am programme.

In January 2002, he moved to Heart Scotland where he again presented the late night phone-in. Later in 2002, his show was networked across all three Real Radio stations (Scotland, Wales and Yorkshire).

He presented his last Real Radio show on 19 December 2002, subsequently deciding to take a break from radio for over two years.

=== Return to radio ===
On 3 September 2005 Abbot was heard on London's 102.2 Smooth FM, presenting the Saturday morning show. He stood in for various presenters, including on 'Weekend Breakfast', and covered shows on digital station Planet Rock. This became a regular gig from 17 December 2005 onwards, airing on Saturdays and Sundays from 2–6 pm.

In 2006, he had brief stint standing in on Caroline Feraday's weekend show (10 pm – 1 am, Friday, Saturday and Sunday nights) on LBC, from 10 to 19 February. However, he lost his voice during his second show, cutting the show short and being replaced by a recording of his friend and former Virgin and Talk colleague/sparring partner Wendy Lloyd. He was also unable to present the following evening's show, but returned on 17 February for the final three shows of this stint. He subsequently took over a regular slot on LBC on Saturday nights from 10 pm to 1 am.

Abbot's show had a distinctive style among LBC presenters. It became normal for a summary of the week's news to take place at the start of the show over his opening jingle, "Boogie Woogie" by Liberace. During the show, he played various sound clips including quotes from films and clips from his former co-presenter Carol McGiffin.

In late 2007, he took over LBC's weekday evening show from 7 pm to 10 pm, while continuing with the Planet Rock weekend show (the latter ending in September 2008).

== Current radio work ==
Abbot now presents a show on LBC from 10 p.m. to 1 a.m. on Fridays, Saturdays and Sundays. Featuring commentary and discussion on current affairs and other subjects, the Friday and Saturday night shows have a strong emphasis on humour. His links and commentaries are punctuated by short dialogue clips drawn from film soundtracks and politicians. Calls to the Friday and Saturday shows are often not on serious topics and callers are given free rein. The Sunday night show has a more formal style (featuring serious topics) and does not feature sound clips or humorous material.

Abbot also usually presents a week of A to Z themed shows on LBC during the Christmas period, covers for other LBC presenters on an occasional basis and writes a blog for the LBC website. In March 2017 he launched a new podcast entitled The Nick Abbot Habit with a second series started in September 2018.

On 5 July 2019, Abbot announced on his show that he and his former co-host Carol McGiffin were set to reunite for a new podcast series called "What's Your Problem With Nick and Carol?" The podcast was released on iTunes, the Global player app, and podcast providers on 20 January 2020.

== Books ==
Abbot has written a series of books, mainly on topics and news from the time of publishing, including Listen to Me, I Know Everything and Do You Mind If I Say A Few Words, which chart his columns through a specific time period.

== Bibliography ==
- Abbot, Nick (2010) 2010 Wrapped Up Like a Bag of Chips
- Abbot, Nick (2012) Do You Mind If I Say A Few Words?
- Abbot, Nick (2014) I Suppose You're Wondering About What This Is All About...: Well, I Can't Tell You Because I Don't Know Myself
- Abbot, Nick (2015) Listen to Me, I Know Everything
- Abbot, Nick (2017) Well, the Whole World's Gone Crazy
- Abbot, Nick (2018) MY TREMENDOUS YEAR IN THE HUGE SHADOW OF DONALD TRUMP'S AWESOME ORANGE BIGLINESS
- Abbot, Nick (2019) The Car Crash 24 Hour a Day Multiple Newsgasm: The View from the Back Seat
- Abbot, Nick (2021) The Ups and Downs, the Cheese and Wine of 2021: Includes the Full A-Z of 2021
- Abbot, Nick (2022) What have we done to deserve this?: Includes the Full A-Z of 2022
- Abbot, Nick (2023) Perfectly normal in a well-run country: Includes the Full A-Z of 2023
- Abbot, Nick (2025) What a way to run a country: Includes the Full A-Z of 2024
- Abbot, Nick (2026) THANKYOU FOR YOUR ATTENTION TO THIS MATTER: The A-Z of 2025
