= Iain Lee =

English broadcaster, writer, and former television presenter and stand-up comedian

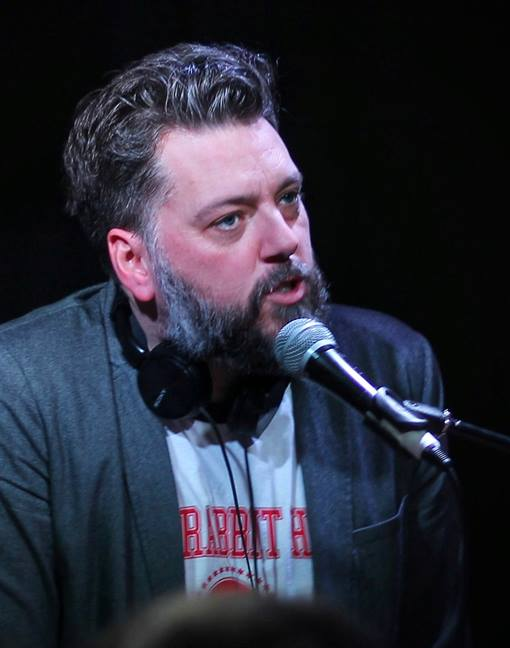
- Lee hosting The Rabbit Hole Show in 2017
- Born: Iain Lee Rougvie; 9 June 1973 (age 53); Slough, Buckinghamshire, England
- Other name: Iain Felix Diamond Lee
- Occupations: Broadcaster, writer, comedian
- Children: 2
- Website: iainlee.com

Iain Felix Diamond Lee (born Iain Lee Rougvie; 9 June 1973) is an English broadcaster, writer, and comedian.

Lee's career began in the 1990s as a stand-up comedian before he gained nationwide fame as co-host of The 11 O'Clock Show from 1998 to 2000 and the breakfast show RI:SE in 2003. He began a full-time radio career in 2005, hosting mainly talk-based shows on LBC 97.3, Absolute Radio, BBC Three Counties Radio, BBC Radio WM, and talkRADIO, which earned him numerous radio awards. In July 2020, after his contract at talkRADIO was not renewed, Lee launched Twitch and Patreon shows.

Lee has also become a trained counsellor.

== Early life ==
Iain Lee Rougvie was born on 9 June 1973 in Slough, then a part of Buckinghamshire. He has Scottish roots. Lee's father worked at the props department at the BBC and his mother was a secretary until she developed multiple sclerosis which put her into an early retirement. The couple divorced when Lee was a youngster.

Lee was raised on a council estate and recalled being bullied by fellow pupils because they considered him posh. By the late 1990s, Lee had dropped the "Rougvie" from his name. He officially changed his name to Iain Lee by deed poll in 2008, due to his troubled relationship with his father. Lee is the nephew of Scottish former footballer Doug Rougvie. He attended Herschel Grammar School in Slough and studied performing arts at Middlesex University.

== Career ==
=== Comedy ===
Lee began a stand-up comedy career in the 1990s, initially performing on the London circuit exclusively before touring nationwide. Lee considers his time as a stand-up to be a low point in his life, due to the fact that he started abusing drugs and alcohol during this time. He met Mackenzie Crook, who was also a stand-up comic at the time and the two became friends.

Lee returned to stand-up comedy in 2026 with a touring show called Imposter Syndrome in which he plays clips from his old TV shows and reflects on his career. He has also taken bookings to perform the show in people's living rooms.

=== Radio ===
Lee began his radio career in December 1997, presenting a four-hour show on Horizon 103.3, an independent station in Milton Keynes, on Christmas Day. At that point, he was 24 years old with only fifteen minutes experience in a studio and did not take any compliance or Ofcom regulation exam prior. Lee went on to feature on the station's breakfast show The Morning Crew hosted by Trevor Marshall and Helen Legh, as Iain in Black Thunder and Iain McCartney. From 1999 to 2001, Lee hosted a show on Xfm London.

Lee embarked on a full-time radio career in January 2005, starting with a stint on talk station LBC 97.3. He joined the station hosting weekend evenings before moving to afternoon drive, which he named The 3 Hour 4 'Till 7 Iain Lee Afternoon Wireless Show and later The 3-and-a-Half Hour 3 'Till 6.30 Iain Lee Afternoon Wireless Show. Lee was known for hosting a segment named Triple M (also known as Mental Mayhem or Mick's Mental Mayhem), where calls went straight to air without being pre-screened, which Nick Abbot, Tommy Boyd, and Clive Bull had also done. The segment received its own dedicated slot on Sunday nights in 2007. At the time, management favoured the unique format as they hoped that it would introduce exclusive listeners to the radio station. Lee then hosted the 7–10pm weekday slot which was named Iain Lee's Good Evening. In 2007, Global Radio purchased LBC which led to a change in management, who introduced a talk format of topical and news-driven conversation. Lee's presenting style fell out of favour and he left the station without prior announcement in November 2007.

In January 2008, Lee began to host The Sunday Night Show on Virgin Radio, later Absolute Radio, from 10pm to 1am that featured music and talk. In April 2009, Lee wrestled a listener which was broadcast the following month. From 12 October 2009, Lee took over the Monday to Thursday evening slot. In October 2011, the station announced that Lee's contract would be terminated with immediate effect by mutual agreement. His departure occurred during a court case in which a listener was accused of harassing Lee, his wife, and the show's producer.

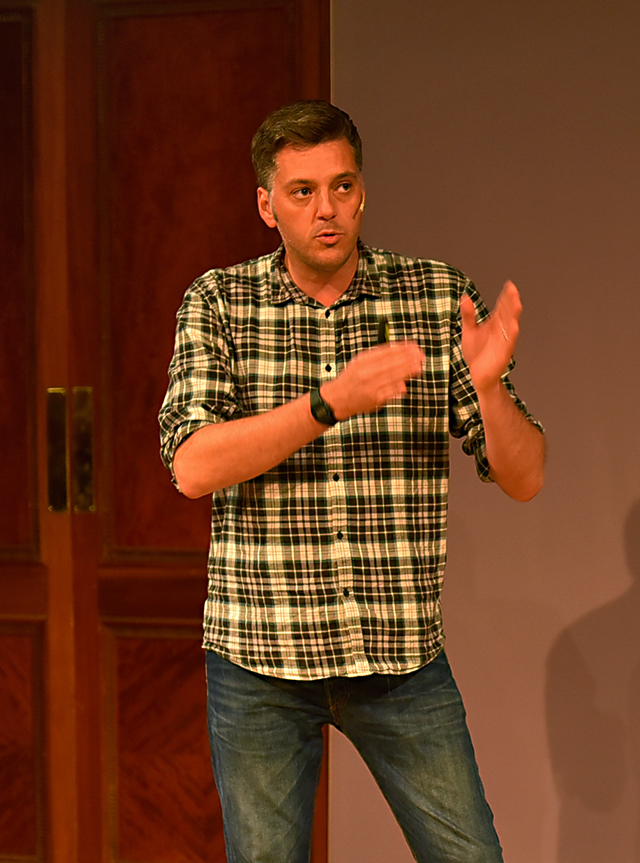
Lee in 2015

From 2012 to 2015, Lee presented the weekday breakfast show on BBC Three Counties Radio, a local service that served Bedfordshire, Hertfordshire, and Buckinghamshire. He later said that he accepted the job as he was unable to find work elsewhere, and felt "crushed" and a little humiliated about taking it at first. From December 2013, Lee also presented a Saturday morning show on BBC Radio WM, the BBC's West Midlands service, which was followed by a Friday afternoon slot on the station from September 2014. He left the station in the following August, citing that management considered Lee hosting both slots as "odd" and wanted him to just present on Saturdays, which he rejected.

In May 2014, Lee's Three Counties show won a Radio Academy Award for Breakfast Show of the Year (Under 10 Million). On 12 August 2014, Lee was accused of making a racist remark to his producer following a spoof on-air argument, in which Lee said; "Go on, go and do the black and Asian show. Bye bye." The argument was described as banter and the BBC apologised for the comments. In November 2015, Lee was dismissed from Three Counties. His departure followed complaints received about his interview with a lawyer from Christian Concern earlier in the month, in which Lee accused her of being "bigoted" and "homophobic" after she defended a minister quoting verses from the Bible condemning homosexuality as sinful.

In February 2016, Lee announced that he had joined the first line-up of presenters for the launch of a new talk radio station, talkRADIO. The station began to air on 21 March 2016, with Lee hosting The Late Night Alternative from 10pm to 1 am on weekdays. In 2017, he won a Gold Award at the Audio and Radio Industry Awards in the Best Speech Presenter – Non-Breakfast category. He won a second in 2020, this time for Moment of the Year for directing emergency services to a caller who had taken an overdose. Despite the success, Lee announced on 2 June 2020 that his contract was not renewed.

On 10 July 2020, Lee announced that he had been signed by Twitch to continue hosting The Late Night Alternative on its streaming platform. It launched on 20 July and was recorded from Lee's home in Aylesbury, Buckinghamshire. The show allowed video calls from viewers worldwide.

In June 2022, Lee was announced as the new presenter of Jack FM's breakfast show, Iain Lee's Rude Awakening, from 4 July. On 6 February 2023, Lee announced his retirement from radio in order to focus more on his work as a counsellor.

Lee presented his final radio show on 8 February 2023, on Jack FM, in a show which featured previous regular callers and producers from across his career.

=== Television ===
From 1998 to 2000, Lee was a correspondent and co-host of the satirical comedy show The 11 O'Clock Show on Channel 4. The show was known for introducing comedians Sacha Baron Cohen and Ricky Gervais. In one incident, Lee received death threats and had a stalker after he joked about Danniella Westbrook and her drug use. The police advised him to move out of his flat; he lived with Mackenzie Crook and in a hotel before the matter was resolved. In January 2000, Lee and co-host Daisy Donovan were criticised by Ofcom for making "death jokes" on the recently murdered Jill Dando. After four series, Lee walked out five days before filming of the fifth was due to start. He later said that it was an unfair move, but felt the quality of the show's humour had declined and Channel 4 had cut its budget. Lee said he would have earned £90,000 if he had stayed.

In 2002, Lee accepted an offer to co-host a relaunch of the Channel 4 live breakfast show RI:SE with reality television star Kate Lawler, from January 2003. The show failed to make an impact in viewing figures, however, and it ended in December 2003. By this time, Lee described himself as a "full blown cocaine addict" and would often smoke cannabis before filming RI:SE and take cocaine afterwards. Lee described the year 2004 as "absolutely terrible" in regard to his career. He started to binge drink to cope with the stress, and spent around £2,000 on cocaine each week. Lee went on to present the video game show Thumb Bandits on Channel 4. Later he made regular appearances on Sky News and This Morning, and hosted the Big Brother companion series Bit on the Psych for Channel 5.

In November 2017, Lee took part in the seventeenth series of I'm a Celebrity...Get Me Out of Here!. Lee entered the show on Day 5. During the show, Lee was elected Prime Minister of 10 Downing Creek. Lee made it to the final and finished in third place. He spoke openly about mental health whilst participating in the show.

From the start of 2018, Lee was on the breakfast TV show Good Morning Britain, filling in for Richard Arnold who was taking a 3-week break.

=== Other work ===
Lee currently writes a column in the Retro Gamer magazine. He wrote a gaming column for MSN.co.uk, as well as recording monthly podcasts. He has also appeared on XLeague.tv discussing video games.

Lee has appeared on BBC Radio 4's Loose Ends, and presented the official Big Brother radio show with co-host Gemma Cairney, entitled Big Brother's Big Ears. Lee has also been heard as a continuity announcer on the TV channel Dave.

In August 2007, Lee launched a podcast entitled Iain Lee Presents... Shindiggery. It ended in November 2008.

In 2009, Lee took part in an experimental comedy performance by artists Iain Forsyth and Jane Pollard in Sheffield called Performer. Audience. Fuck Off, a spin-off to the Performer/Audience/Mirror originally conceived in 1975 by American artist Dan Graham, whereby the performer does their act behind a mirror reflecting the audience.

In February 2012, Lee launched The Iain Lee Pocket Radio Show, a podcast similar in style to his radio shows but utilised various social media platforms for content. Most of it featured conversations with listeners via phone calls or Skype chats. Listeners were also invited to interact with the show by sending AudioBoos to be included in the recording. The podcast also included Lee interviewing guests and celebrity news with Elisa Roche.

Lee had a cameo role in a music video for the British IBM's self-titled single, released in 2012.

In 2015, Lee and Glenn Gretlund formed 7a Records, an independent record label specialising in obscure recordings by The Monkees and the group's members. In 2020, Lee sold his share of the company.

=== The Late Night Alternative ===
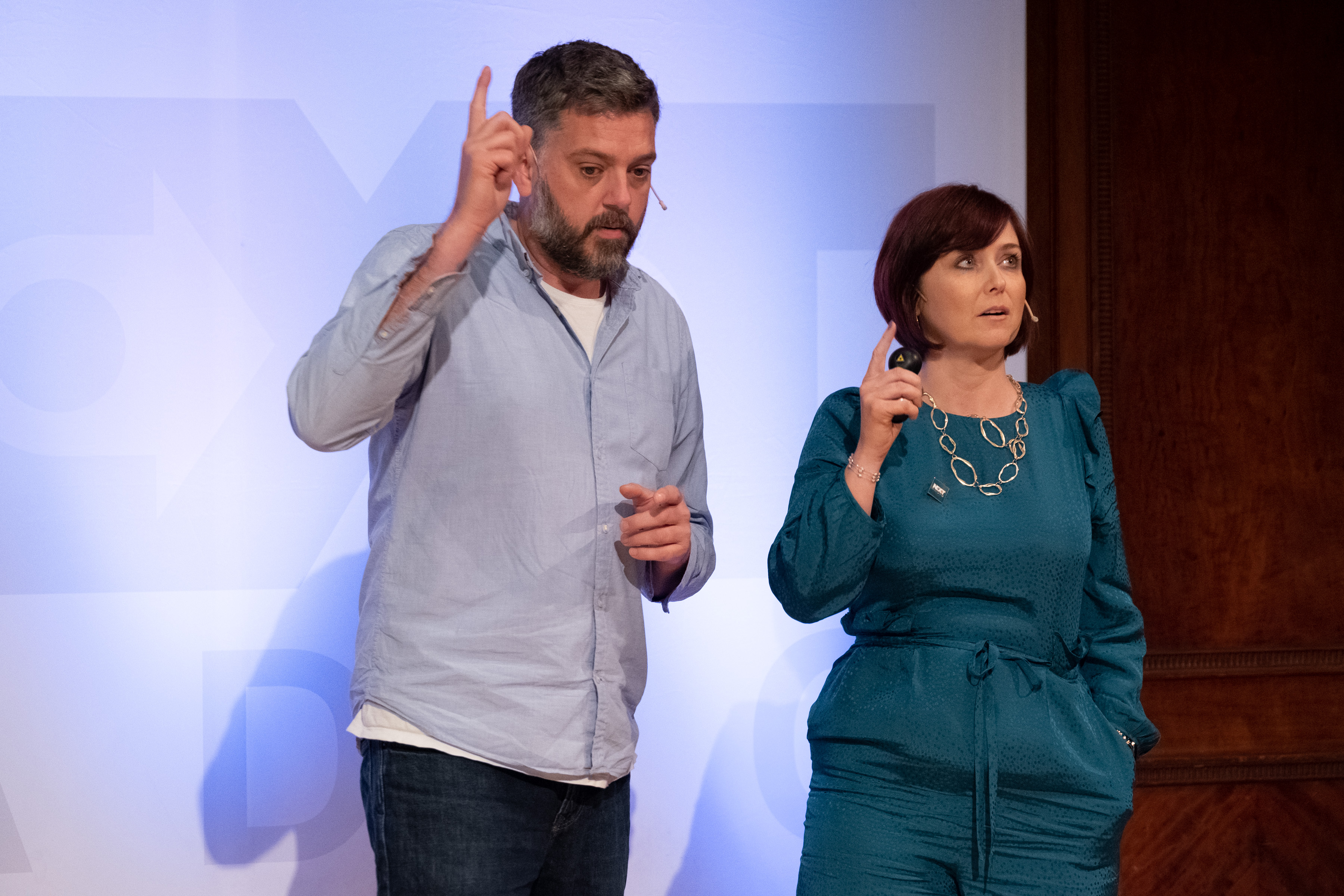
Lee and Boyle

The Late Night Alternative (TLNA) is an online phone-in show Lee and Katherine Boyle hosted on streaming platform Twitch. The programme was first broadcast on British radio station Talkradio between March 2016 and June 2020, and won several Audio and Radio Industry Awards, including 'Best Speech Presenter – Non-Breakfast' for Lee. In July 2020, Lee and Boyle announced the programme's return via Twitch, with the first episode airing on 20 July.

In May 2017, Lee and Boyle created a record for a phone-in British radio show when the pair took over 150 calls in one three hour show, after announcing anyone could call and would be put through straight to air. The attempt to take a world record 200 calls failed when the phone system broke down due to the number of callers attempting to get through.

On 19 December 2018, a man called the show after a drug overdose. Lee kept the man on the line whilst Boyle directed the emergency services to his location, with many on social media praising Lee's decisive actions. Lee stated on 24 December 2018 that the man had survived and was now back home after receiving specialist treatment for two days. Lee and Boyle were later awarded a Gold in the 'Moment of the Year' category at the 2020 Audio and Radio Industry Awards for this call.

On 2 June 2020, Lee announced his contract at Talkradio would not be renewed, having presented his final programme the previous evening. On 10 July 2020, the pair issued a press release confirming they had been signed by internet streaming service Twitch and would re-launch the programme on 20 July.

== Personal life ==
In March 2018, Lee announced that he and his wife, broadcaster Helena Wilkinson, were getting divorced. The couple have two sons. At the time of the announcement, Lee confessed he had relapsed in drug use after being sober for 13 years, in a three-month period following his stint on I'm a Celebrity... Get Me Out of Here!, to which he credited Katherine Boyle in taking him to an Alcoholics Anonymous meeting. In September 2020, Lee said he had broken a two-and-a-half year period of sobriety when he relapsed on cocaine.

Lee legally changed his name to Iain Felix Diamond Lee, with his middle names being chosen by his sons.

In July 2019, Lee came out as bisexual on his radio show, something that he had felt embarrassed about and tried to handle it with drugs and extramarital affairs. He credited sessions with a therapist to deal with his depression, which began when he started having sex with older men at fourteen. He realised that "Now I can see that it was abuse."

In September 2020, Lee started a college course to become a counsellor.

Lee got engaged to his long-time co-host Katherine Boyle in 2025.

== Credits ==
| Year | Title | Role | Notes |
|---|---|---|---|
| 1994 | The Danny Baker Show | Drummer | 1 episode |
| 1998–2000 | The 11 O'Clock Show | Presenter | 111 episodes |
| 1998, 2000 | They Think It's All Over | Panellist | 2 episodes |
| 1999, 2000 | The Channel 4 Political Awards | Reporter | 2 episodes |
| 1999 | Faking It | Narrator | |
| 1999 | Comedy Café | Guest | 2 episodes |
| 1999, 2000 | Comedy Lab | Presenter | 2 episodes |
| 2000 | Thumb Candy: The History of Computer Games | Presenter | |
| 2001 | E For Edge | Narrator | |
| 2001 | You Don't Know Jack | Host | Unaired pilot for Channel 4. Uploaded by Lee to YouTube in September 2025 |
| 2001 | Edinburgh Comedy Awards | Presenter | |
| 2001 | I Love the '80s | Guest | 7 episodes |
| 2001 | Liquid News | Presenter | 20 episodes |
| 2001 | Mental! | Presenter | 16 episodes |
| 2001–2002 | Thumb Bandits | Presenter | 13 episodes |
| 2002 | My Worst Week | Presenter | 5 episodes |
| 2002, 2008, 2018 | The Wright Stuff | Guest | 4 episodes |
| 2002–2003 | RI:SE | Presenter | 205 episodes |
| 2003–2004 | Flipside TV | Presenter | |
| 2003 | Stupid Punts | Panellist | 1 episode |
| 2003–2009 | Big Brother's Little Brother | Guest | 29 episodes |
| 2003 | Q Awards | Presenter | |
| 2004 | Top Buzzer | Booze Delivery Guy | 1 episode |
| 2004 | Game Stars | Presenter | |
| 2004 | The Simpsons Quiz Show | Contestant | |
| 2004 | The Weakest Link | Contestant | 1 episode |
| 2005 | Monkey Trousers | Various characters | 1 episode |
| 2005 | FAQ U | Panellist | 2 episodes |
| 2005 | 8 Out of 10 Cats | Panellist | 2 episodes |
| 2005 | Banned in the UK | Guest | 4 episodes |
| 2005 | Citizen TV | Guest | 1 episode |
| 2005 | How to Start Your Own Country | Guest | 1 episode |
| 2005–2006 | Celebrity Soup | Presenter | 33 episodes |
| 2006 | Morning Glory | Newspaper Reviewer | 1 episode |
| 2006 | Law of the Playground | Guest | 7 episodes |
| 2006 | TV Now and Then | Panellist | 1 episode |
| 2006 | Popcorn | Guest | 1 episode |
| 2006 | The Race | Interviewer | 7 episodes |
| 2006 | Frank Sidebottom's Proper Telly Show | Guest | 1 episode |
| 2006 | Celebrity Mastermind | Contestant | 1 episode |
| 2007 | How Do They Do It? | Narrator | 20 episodes |
| 2007 | The Beckhams Go to Hollywood | Presenter | |
| 2007 | Wills and Harry Go to Vegas | Presenter | |
| 2007 | Tittybangbang | Various characters | 6 episodes |
| 2008 | The Comedy Map of Britain | Guest | 1 episode |
| 2008 | Ready, Steady, Cook | Contestant | 1 episode |
| 2008–2009, 2018 | The One Show | Reporter | 10 episodes |
| 2009 | Celebrity Juice | Panellist | 1 episode |
| 2009 | Big Brother | Guest | 1 episode |
| 2009, 2010, 2014 | The Alan Titchmarsh Show | Guest | 3 episodes |
| 2009 | The All Star Impressions Show | Various Characters | |
| 2010 | The Persuasionists | Billy Hitchens | 6 episodes |
| 2010 | The Real Hustle | Guest | 1 episode |
| 2010 | Come Dine with Me | Contestant | 1 episode |
| 2010–2012 | This Morning | Newspaper Reviewer | 42 episodes |
| 2010 | 100 Greatest Toys | Guest | |
| 2011, 2012 | Let's Sing and Dance | Performer/Judge | 2 episodes |
| 2011–2013 | Sky News: Press Preview | Newspaper Reviewer | 10 episodes |
| 2011 | I'm a Celebrity: Get Me Out of Here! NOW! | Guest | 4 episodes |
| 2011–2017 | Sky News: Sunrise | Newspaper Reviewer | 67 episodes |
| 2012–2014 | Big Brother's Bit on the Side | Guest | 19 episodes |
| 2012 | BBC Breakfast | Guest | 1 episode |
| 2013–2014 | BBC Inside Out: London | Reporter | 5 episodes |
| 2013–2014 | Big Brother's Bit on the Psych | Presenter | 28 episodes |
| 2015–2018 | ...Make You Laugh Out Loud | Voiceover | 32 episodes |
| 2015 | Celebrity Big Brother: Heroes and Villains | Guest | |
| 2015 | Iain Lee: My Mixtape | Presenter | |
| 2015–2017 | Sam Delaney's News Thing | Panellist | 20 episodes |
| 2016 | The Saturday Show | Guest presenter | 2 episodes |
| 2016 | Pointless Celebrities | Contestant | 1 episode |
| 2016 | Blink | Contestant | 1 episode |
| 2017 | The Vintage TV Sessions | Presenter | 1 episode |
| 2017 | I'm a Celebrity...Get Me Out of Here! | Contestant | 20 episodes |
| 2017 | I'm a Celebrity: Extra Camp | Contestant | 18 episodes |
| 2017– | Lorraine | Competition Presenter | 7 episodes |
| 2017–2018 | Loose Women | Competition Presenter | 37 episodes |
| 2017– | Good Morning Britain | Guest Showbiz Reporter | 38 episodes |
| 2018 | Sunday Brunch | Guest | 1 episode |
| 2018 | Me and My Mental Health | Guest | |
| 2018 | Saturday Morning with James Martin | Guest | 1 episode |
| 2018 | Celebrity Chase | Contestant | 1 episode |
| 2019 | Celebrity Game Night | Panellist | 1 episode |
| 2020 | Mandy | Himself | 1 episode |

== Filmography ==
- Beyond Borders (directed by Martin Campbell)
- Radio Mania (directed by Iain Forsyth and Jane Pollard)
- Mandy (episode “Broadsword to Donna Ball”).

== Audio and Radio Industry Awards ==
| Year | Nominee / work | Award | Result |
|---|---|---|---|
| 2017 | Iain Lee | Best Speech Presenter – Non-Breakfast | Gold |
| 2020 | "Overdosing man calls Iain Lee" | RadioTimes Moment of the Year | Gold |
| 2020 | Iain Lee | Best Speech Presenter | Shortlisted |

== See also ==
- The Sunday Night Show
