= Celebrity Soup =

- Genre: Infotainment
- Starring: Iain Lee
- Country of origin: United Kingdom
- No. of series: 2

Production
- Executive producers: Jay Pond-Jones; Nick Sotirakos; Richard Bacon; David Brook
- Producers: Ray Addison; David Owen; Jess Sebastian (series producer); Dan Whitehead (series producer)
- Running time: 22 minutes

Original release
- Network: E!
- Release: 2005 – 2006

Celebrity Soup is a weekly comedy series focusing on recaps of various pop culture and reality show television highlights of the week. It was broadcast on E! Entertainment Television and was the UK version of the USA's long-running series The Soup. There were two series aired from 2005–2006.

The series was hosted by Iain Lee who provided sarcastic commentary on the various clips.

The show was filmed on bluescreen at Princess Productions' Bayswater Studios in London.
