= Shake n' Vac =

Powdered carpet freshener by S. C. Johnson

Glade Shake n' Vac
- Agency: S. C. Johnson & Son
- Language: English
- Running time: 30 seconds
- Product: Glade Shake n' Vac
- Release date: 1980
- Music by: 1950s rock and roll style
- Starring: Jenny Logan
- Country: United Kingdom

Glade Shake n' Vac is a powdered carpet freshener. The powder is shaken onto the carpet before vacuuming. It is marketed and sold in the United Kingdom by S. C. Johnson & Son. First sold in 1979, the product's "Dancing Woman" television commercial during the 1980s was voted one of the most popular in Britain.

== Advertising ==
First going on air in the early 1980s, the advertisement featured the English actress Jenny Logan, dancing about in a typical British living room in high heels, shaking the powder onto a carpet and vacuuming it up, while appearing to sing a musical jingle. The main lyric is "do the Shake n' Vac, and put the freshness back". The commercial was produced by Benton and Bowles advertising agency, written and art directed by Peter West and Guy Winston and produced by Simon Wells.

Although the Shake n' Vac product was on sale in shops in 1979, ITV industrial action of 1979 resulted in the television advert being delayed until 1980.

The jingle was in a 1950s rock and roll retro style. In 2000, the advertisement polled 18th place in the Channel 4 The 100 Greatest TV Adverts programme, and an ITV list in 2005.
