= Melanie Sykes =

Former English television and radio presenter

- Born: August 7, 1970 (age 56); Ashton-under-Lyne, Lancashire, England
- Occupations: Television presenter; radio presenter
- Years active: 1995–2021
- Television: Today with Des and Mel (2002–2006); The Vault (2003–2004); Let's Do Lunch (2011–2014); Humble Pie (2015)
- Spouses: Daniel Caltagirone (m. 2001; div. 2009) Jack Cockings (m. 2013; div. 2016)
- Children: 2

Melanie Ann Sykes (born 1970) is an English former television and radio presenter. She is best known for co-hosting Today with Des and Mel with Des O'Connor and Let's Do Lunch with Gino D'Acampo. She also co-hosted Going Out with Alan Carr on BBC Radio 2 with Alan Carr from May 2010 until it ended in March 2012, and returned with him for Alan and Mel's Summer Escape from 2017 to 2020. Sykes co-presented Shop Well for Less alongside Joanna Page on BBC One.

She ended her career in the entertainment industry in 2021, following a comment from Celebrity MasterChef judge Gregg Wallace.

== Early life ==
Sykes was born in 1970 at Ashton-under-Lyne to an English father and an Anglo-Indian mother. She attended Mossley Hollins High School and studied A-level Religious Studies at Ashton Sixth Form College. Sykes was a member of the Ashtonian Brass Band, along with her father, mother and two sisters, playing the baritone horn.

== Career ==
In the mid-1990s, Sykes first came to public attention as the face of the Boddingtons Bitter advertisements. Her first advert was shown in September 1996, and was filmed three months earlier in Malibu, California near Los Angeles. The ice cream van advert was first shown on 20 September 1997 during Channel 4's Football Italia. The advert was filmed at Coyote Lake (San Bernardino County, California), with an ice cream van from Withington.

=== Television ===
Sykes' television presenting career started by hosting Sky One's Real TV UK series in the mid-90s. After first reporting for The Big Breakfast, Sykes has continued her television career, including presenting stints on I'm a Celebrity...Get Me Out of Here! and as presenter of EastEnders Revealed. In 1999, Sykes presented Melanie Sykes' Southall Stories, a documentary for BBC Two on Asian culture in Great Britain. She has also hosted a variety of awards ceremonies, including Miss World, the BAFTA Awards and the Q Awards.

She presented Today with Des and Mel with Des O'Connor in 2002. On 12 May 2006, ITV announced that the show would be one of a number to be axed in a "painful, but utterly necessary" move.

Sykes' other work for ITV has included hosting shows The Vault (2003–2004), Celebrities Under Pressure (2003–2004) and The British Soap Awards (2003).

Sykes appeared as a guest panellist on Loose Women in October and November 2005 and later returned as a guest anchor in October 2008 and May 2009.

From 2006 to 2009, Sykes occasionally filled in for Paul O'Grady as presenter of The Paul O'Grady Show when O'Grady was unable to appear.

Sykes was the presenter of the daytime series Gene Detectives for BBC One. In 2008, Sykes was a judge on 'The Sofa Factor', an item for GMTV, where viewers sent in short clips and the winner got to present TV Pick of the Day and win a trip to Las Vegas.

In 2010, Sykes guest presented five episodes of The 5 O'Clock Show with Denise van Outen on Channel 4.

In August 2011, Sykes returned to daytime television, co-hosting Let's Do Lunch with Gino & Mel and Let's Do Christmas with Gino & Mel with Gino D'Acampo on ITV. The show was cancelled in 2014.

On 13 September 2011, Sykes co-hosted the three-part series Missing Millions with Paul Heiney on ITV.

In January 2014, Melanie Sykes collaborated with her friend, writer Simon W. Golding, on various projects for television - including the comedy/drama series Bern & Glow. The show was loosely based on her hit show Today with Des and Mel, with Des O'Connor.

In February 2014, BT Sport announced that Sykes would become part of their MotoGP team. Due to other work commitments, she left the channel in May 2014.

In 2014, Sykes took part in the fourteenth series of I'm a Celebrity...Get Me Out of Here! where she finished in third place, behind runner-up Jake Quickenden and winner Carl Fogarty.

In 2015, Sykes co-presented Humble Pie, a cookery series for Watch, alongside Marco Pierre White. On 4 April 2017, Sykes was confirmed as the new voice of Blind Date, taking over the role most famously held by Graham Skidmore in the original series. The show is broadcast on Saturday nights on Channel 5.

In 2017, Sykes appeared on a "celebrity" charity edition of TV quiz show, The Chase. She departed early and did not make the final round.

In March 2018, Sykes won Star Baker in Channel 4's The Great Stand Up to Cancer Bake Off.

In 2021 Sykes alongside Joanna Page were the new presenters of BBC One's consumer series Shop Well for Less.

In August 2021 it was announced that Sykes would be a competitor on BBC's Celebrity MasterChef. She progressed to the semi-final where she won Star Chef on the fourth day. Sykes revealed that a comment, during this period, from Celebrity MasterChef judge, Gregg Wallace, led her to end her career in the entertainment industry.

=== Radio ===
Sykes presented The A List, a national radio chart show based on total sales, produced by Unique the Production Company at the studios of London's Heart 106.2. She left the show towards the end of 2006 and was replaced by Gail Porter.

Sykes was heard on BBC Radio 2 with Aled Jones sitting in for Steve Wright in the Afternoon on 22, 23 and 24 December 2008. In May 2010, she began co-hosting the BBC Radio 2 show Going Out with Alan Carr after Emma Forbes' resignation. Sykes continued on the show until its end in March 2012. She returned on Boxing Day 2015 with Alan Carr for a one-off show on BBC Radio 2. In January/February 2017 she and Carr again returned to Radio 2 to sit in for Paul O'Grady for 4 weeks.

Sykes and Carr presented their own Saturday morning show called Alan and Mel's Summer Escape on BBC Radio 2 for 10 weeks during the summer of 2017. She presented a show with Carr on BBC Radio 2 on Christmas Eve and another on New Year's Eve in 2017. Sykes and Carr returned for further specials for Easter, for the Royal Wedding, and for further runs of Alan and Mel's Summer Escape in 2018, 2019 and 2020.

For a time, Sykes presented her own radio show on Capital FM.

=== Other work ===
Sykes has been the face of Head & Shoulders shampoo in Britain, appearing in print and television advertising and the high street chain Matalan. She has also appeared in advertisements for Morrisons, Boddingtons, Wynsors World of Shoes and Churchill Insurance.

In 2006 the book Blooming Beautiful: My Plan for Looking Great, Being Healthy and Surviving Hormonal Havoc, Throughout Pregnancy and as a New Mum, co-written by Sykes with Hilary Boyd, was published by Michael Joseph.

Sykes posed naked for the December 2011 edition of men's magazine Esquire. Sykes had her own line of underwear and lingerie with high street chain and retailer Debenhams. In June 2016 Sykes created FRANK Magazine, "the magazine for open-minded women of all ages across the world".

== Personal life ==
She was the girlfriend of Matt Goss from early 1991, for five years. Sykes married actor Daniel Caltagirone in January 2001. The couple have two sons, born in 2002 and 2004. In July 2008, it was reported that the couple had separated, with Sykes having "grown apart" from Caltagirone, who had moved out of their Hampstead, London home. They divorced in June 2009. Sykes married Jack Cockings on 18 May 2013 at Sherborne Castle in Dorset.

In November 2013, Sykes was arrested and cautioned by police over a common assault against Cockings. Soon after the caution, after less than one year of marriage, Sykes began the process of filing for divorce. The caution was later revoked and deleted from police records, and Sykes has since campaigned for better treatment of women facing domestic violence, including from partners who make spurious allegations of assault so as to legally and financially harm their victims. She has said that the police handled her case badly and misled her into accepting a caution as the quickest way out of her situation.

In November 2021 Sykes received an autism diagnosis, which she said gave her a "deeper understanding of myself, my life, and the things I have endured". Her younger son is also autistic, having been diagnosed at three years old. In July 2023 Sykes revealed she had self-diagnosed with Tourette syndrome.

In 2026 Sykes developed alopecia totalis, losing her hair.

== Filmography ==
Television

Year	Title	Role	Notes
1997–2001	The Big Breakfast	Co-presenter	
1999	Melanie Sykes' Southall Stories	Presenter	TV series
2002–2006	Today with Des and Mel	Co-presenter	
2003	The British Soap Awards	Co-presenter	One-off special
2003–2004	Celebrities Under Pressure	Presenter	2 series
2003–2004	The Vault	Presenter	2 series
2005–2013	Loose Women	Guest presenter/panellist	13 episodes
2006–2009	The Paul O'Grady Show	Guest presenter	11 episodes
2007	Gene Detectives	Presenter	1 series
2010	The 5 O'Clock Show	Co-presenter	5 episodes
2011	Missing Millions	Co-presenter	1 series
2011–2014	Let's Do Lunch with Gino & Mel	Co-presenter	4 series
2012–2014	Let's Do Christmas with Gino & Mel	Co-presenter	3 series
2014	I'm a Celebrity... Get Me Out of Here!	Contestant	Series 14
2015	Humble Pie	Co-presenter	1 series
2017–2019	Blind Date	Voiceover	4 series
2020	The Great Pottery Throw Down	Presenter	1 series
2021–2022	Shop Well For Less	Co-presenter	Joined in series 5
2021	Shop Well for the Planet?	Co-presenter	Three-part series
2021	Celebrity MasterChef	Contestant	Series 16
