= Blind Date (British game show) =

UK game show

- Genre: Dating game show
- Presented by: Cilla Black; Paul O'Grady
- Announcer: Graham Skidmore; Tommy Sandhu; Melanie Sykes
- Theme music composer: Laurie Holloway
- Ending theme: Paul Masterson (1996–1999)
- Composers: Jonathan Sorrell (1989–1993); Guy Forrester and Maire Morgan (1993–1999); David Arch and Mark Campbell (1999–2002); Big Head Music (2002–2003); Philip Pope (2017–2019)
- Country of origin: United Kingdom
- Original language: English
- No. of series: 18 (ITV); 4 (Channel 5)
- No. of episodes: 373 (ITV; inc. 12 specials); 33 (Channel 5) (list of episodes)

Production
- Production locations: The London Studios (1985–2003, 2017–2018); Television Centre (2018); The Maidstone Studios (2019)
- Running time: 45 minutes (1985–1988); 50 minutes (1989–1990); 60 minutes (1990–2003, 2017–2019)
- Production companies: LWT (1985–2003); So Television, Olga TV and Stellify Media (2017–2019)

Original release
- Network: ITV
- Release: 30 November 1985 – 31 May 2003
- Network: Channel 5
- Release: 17 June 2017 – 16 June 2019
- Network: Disney+

Related
- Blind Date: Kiss & Tell; Love on a Saturday Night; Take Me Out; The Love Machine

Blind Date is a British dating game show first produced by London Weekend Television (LWT). An unscreened pilot was made with comic Duncan Norvelle as presenter but it was eventually hosted by Cilla Black, who already hosted the LWT series Surprise Surprise. Blind Date originally ran on Saturday nights from 30 November 1985 to 31 May 2003 on ITV.

The show returned in 2017 on Channel 5. The new series began airing on 17 June 2017 in its usual Saturday night slot and is produced by So Television, Olga TV and Stellify Media, a firm part-owned by Sony Pictures Television. Paul O'Grady presented the revived series. Melanie Sykes became the new voice of the show, taking over the role most famously held by Graham Skidmore in the original series. On 30 June 2025, it was announced that the series was to be rebooted again and this time would be aired on Disney+. In August 2026, it was confirmed that Maura Higgins would present the reboot which is expected to launch in 2027.

== Format ==
The show had a format similar to the show known in Australia as Perfect Match or in the United States as The Dating Game. Three singles of the same sex were introduced to the audience. They were then asked a question by a single individual of the opposite sex, who could hear but not see them, to choose with whom to go on a date. Before the decision "Our Graham" Skidmore, who was never seen, gave an amusing reminder of each contestant. The couple then picked an envelope naming their destination. The following episode showed the couple on their date, as well as interviews with them about the date and each other. Locations ranged from Bognor Regis or a date in an ice cream factory, to Anguilla or the Maldives.

=== 2002 revamp ===
In the final original series (2002–03), the format was tweaked; the "Ditch or Date?" twist was added to the show, allowing the picking contestant to stick with the person they have chosen, or gamble on the single remaining unseen contestant. Skidmore was replaced by Tommy Sandhu who had appeared on the show as a contestant in the late 1990s. Other changes to modernise the show included a revamp of the show's theme tune, a new logo and opening titles and a different studio set.

Also, a behind-the-scenes companion show, called Blind Date: Kiss & Tell was produced for ITV2 and hosted by Sarah Cawood and Brendan Courtney. This would be broadcast in a late evening timeslot to avoid a clash with Popstars: The Rivals. In January 2003, to try to improve dwindling ratings, the show broadcast a special one-off live episode. It was during this episode that Black surprisingly announced her resignation, having been told by producers that it was likely to be the last series.

== History ==
=== Production ===
A pilot, as It's a Hoot!, was shot in early 1985 and fronted by comedian Duncan Norvelle. John Birt, LWT's director of programmes, and the Independent Broadcasting Authority regulatory body had reservations about Norvelle's camp style. Black had seen The Dating Game in the US and enthused about it to LWT's Alan Boyd, the then Controller of Entertainment. Gill Stribling-Wright produced both the pilots with Duncan Norvelle, and Cilla Black, and once the show was commissioned produced the first three series. Thelma Pickles, an old girlfriend of John Lennon, worked as a producer on the show in a subsequent series. The distinctive theme music for Blind Date has a strong resemblance to the jazz standard "Soft Winds" and was composed by Laurie Holloway. It was remixed by Sandhu for the final ITV series.

In 2009, entertainer Des O'Connor revealed that he had unsuccessfully pitched the idea to Phillip Jones, the then Head of Light Entertainment at Thames Television, after watching the Australian version Perfect Match.

=== Popularity and decline ===
At the height of its popularity in the 1980s, 18.2 million tuned in on a Saturday night. Black's scouse accent and her catchphrases became familiar throughout the United Kingdom. The programme was featured as part of ITV's charity telethon in May 1990 and July 1992. The show won the Lew Grade Award at the British Academy Television Awards in 1995.

The series was not one of the 30 top-rated UK TV shows of 2000 and was ranked 45th in ITV's top 50 list with 9.6 million viewers. The first episode of Series 17, on 10 November 2001, was reportedly watched at 19:00 GMT by seven million viewers – 32% of the audience. This was around a million fewer than tuned in to its debut episode in the previous series. Black was responsible for ITV shifting its football programme, The Premiership, to make way for the new series in a prime-time slot. The broadcaster reportedly gave in to Black's ultimatum "move the Premiership football programme or I quit". This was later denied by the host in an interview with journalist Brian Viner.

In April 2002, it was reported that the series would be revamped; later in September, producers denied that Trisha Goddard was being lined up to replace Black as host once her two-year exclusive contract with Granada and ITV finishes at the end of the year. However, a month later, it was reported that talks had begun with Black to settle a deal for a further two series, running through to 2005. At the time she told The Sun newspaper that she would never quit the show and described the new format as "a whole, funky new idea".

Viewing figures had declined to 5 million by 2003. The final episode in May 2003 was seen by 2.9 million viewers.

=== Cancellation ===
The series ended in 2003 when, during a special one-off live episode on 4 January 2003, Black announced she was quitting the show. The production crew had not been told. A change in the show's format was one of the factors in her decision to leave the show, which had become more like work than fun and wanted to leave before it became a "chore". Production was halted after the series ended; while a number of high profile names were reported to be in line as potential replacements for Black. Those more prominently named in the press included Goddard, Dale Winton, Paul O'Grady, Claire Sweeney, Cat Deeley and Davina McCall who was said to have already ruled herself out. Ant and Dec, Brian Dowling, Graham Norton, Jerry Springer, Les Dennis, Lisa Riley and Tara Palmer-Tomkinson were also initially named as possible options. Despite producers insisting that the show would continue with a new presenter, in June it was reportedly cancelled after ITV had been refused permission to make changes to the format by Columbia, the US company which owned Blind Date at the time.

However, ITV briefly aired a similar replacement show in 2004 hosted by McCall, called Love on a Saturday Night, and from 2010 to 2019, Take Me Out, hosted by Paddy McGuinness.

=== Brief return ===
Blind Date returned on 20 May 2006, as part of ITV's coverage of a concert held outside the Tower of London to celebrate the 30th anniversary of the foundation of the charity The Prince's Trust. Comedian Patrick Kielty and TV presenter Kate Thornton acted as hosts for the show which featured Dame Edna Everage, Roger Moore, Richard E. Grant and Chico Slimani as contestants.

It returned again on 16 October 2013 to celebrate Black's 50-year career in the entertainment industry. This special one-off was part of another programme, The One and Only Cilla Black, presented by Paul O'Grady. Black returned as host, and producers brought back three of the show's most memorable contestants who were still single, giving them a second chance to win a date. However, the couple's date was not shown.

=== Revival ===
A planned Irish revival of the format, hosted by Lucy Kennedy on TV3, was dropped by the broadcaster in June 2015. It was later picked up with comedian Al Porter announced as the host in May 2017.

In February 2017, it was announced that Blind Date would be returning but would now be aired on Channel 5 fourteen years after being cancelled. Media outlets reported that a number of potential hosts were being considered, these included Olly Murs, Vicky Pattison, Georgia May Foote and Helen Flanagan. Norton, Kylie Minogue, Catherine Tyldesley, Emma Willis, Rylan Clark, McCall and Leigh Francis were also named as possible choices in the media. Later that month, it was reported that Holly Willoughby had ruled herself out as she was contracted to ITV. On 16 March, Paul O'Grady was announced as the show's new presenter. In April, Melanie Sykes was confirmed to provide the voiceover. The revived series began on 17 June 2017 and received mainly positive reviews. Unlike the original version, the revival features both mixed and same-sex couplings. This version ran for four series until June 2019. Viewing figures were initially positive, with a peak of 2 million viewers tuning in for the premiere episode; however, in the fourth series had fallen to below a million. In March 2020, it was reportedly axed by the network.

In April 2024, during a BBC Radio 4 interview, Hungry Bear Media's co-founder and managing director Dan Baldwin suggested that the format could return on the BBC with Claudia Winkleman as host. On 30 June 2025, it was announced that the show would once again be revived but this time for Disney+ as part of a slate of unscripted UK commissions from the streamer, with Stellify Media and SO Television set as co-producers as with the previous revival. At the end of 2025, it was reported that Emily Atack would host the new series. However, in August 2026, it was confirmed by Disney that Maura Higgins would host the reimagined series in 2027. After being paired, the couples will spend the whole summer together in one permanent location, with new possible partners arriving on a regular basis. Filming is expected to take place in Mexico.

== Celebrity contestants ==
Blind Date featured celebrities before they became well known. These include:

- Nina Wadia (1988)
- Mark Speight (1989)
- Amanda Holden (1991)
- Ed Byrne (1993)
- Howard Griffiths (1993)
- Ortis Deley (1994)
- Jenni Falconer (1994)
- Tommy Sandhu (late 1990s)
- Nikki Grahame (2002)

In a Comic Relief sketch from 1993, Mr. Bean from the British sitcom of the same name appears as a contestant on the show. The sketch featured Rowan Atkinson as Bean, Barbara Durkin as Tracy, Bean's date, and Cilla Black as herself. The other contestants were played by Alan Cumming and Paul Opacic. For Red Nose Day 1999, Black returned to present a live studio version with Lenny Henry choosing between Twiggy, Helena Bonham Carter and Elle Mcpherson.

The first episode of the revamped eighteenth series, broadcast in October 2002, featured the boy band Blue. A 2002 celebrity Christmas edition featured Tara Palmer-Tomkinson and Alex Sibley. In 2021, Alison Hammond revealed that she turned down the opportunity to appear on the programme.

== Weddings ==
During the show's history, three Blind Date weddings took place (as a result of contestants meeting on the show) and were watched by millions of television viewers. Black was a guest at the weddings.

- Sue Middleton and Alex Tatham (1991) – met on the show in 1988, where they were sent on a date to a medieval banquet in County Clare, Ireland. The couple married in October 1991 at St Michael & All Angels Church, Pelsall, with the service being broadcast a day later as part of a special episode that was watched by 18 million viewers. Black attended with her husband Bobby Willis. They returned for the show's 10th anniversary special and celebrated 25 years together in 2013. They appeared as mystery guests on The Big Fat Quiz of Everything 2019 and renewed their wedding vows at the same church in October 2024.
- Lillian Morris and David Fensom (1994) – the elderly couple quickly got engaged after meeting on the show in October 1993 and were married four months later in February 1994 at the town hall register office in Tiverton, Devon. Their wedding was blessed at St Mary’s Church in Hemyock, where the couple lived until moving into a retirement home in 2003. Fensom wrote a book about their time on the show called Number Two, Please - The Story of a Blind Date Wedding.
- Anna Azonwanna and Paul Pratt (1998) – met on the show in September 1993, where they were sent on a date to Zermatt, Switzerland. In a special episode broadcast in 1997, the couple appeared in the studio audience from where Pratt would subsequently propose; they married in October 1998 in Barbados. LWT paid for the wedding and the honeymoon at The Colony Club, a luxury hotel on the island. The other couples also attended the wedding with Cilla.

The programme would also lead to another wedding in 1997; Darren Walker proposed to ex-girlfriend Kellie Cooper after watching her on the show with fellow contestant Tom Jones and this was later featured in a special episode. On 29 December 2001, the episode saw contestant Hannarle Davies from Essex propose to Mark Ackerell from Buckinghamshire after their date to Vienna, Austria. Davies later admitted that the proposal was a joke.

== Cosmopolitan controversy ==
A contestant named Nicola Gill came on the show, claiming she was a temporary secretary, when she was in reality a journalist for Cosmopolitan attempting to go through the entire Blind Date process for a story. When the show's staff and Black found out Gill's true profession, she exposed the truth about Gill's deception, earning the ire of the audience, who booed Gill for not coming on the show with honest intentions. Black also asked Gill if she was already dating, which she denied; a lower-third graphic then revealed she was to be married to her boyfriend in June. Because of the deception, Gill's intended blind date was able to come back on the show for a second time with Black apologizing for not stopping the date beforehand, and was able to choose among three new women for an honest blind date.

== Series overview ==
=== ITV ===
Series	Start date	End date	Episodes
1	30 November 1985	11 January 1986	7
2	30 August 1986	21 December 1986	15
3	5 September 1987	25 December 1987	17
4	3 September 1988	24 December 1988	17
5	16 September 1989	10 February 1990	21
6	29 September 1990	2 February 1991	19
7	7 September 1991	25 January 1992	18
8	10 October 1992	27 March 1993	20
9	18 September 1993	5 February 1994	18
10	1 October 1994	4 March 1995	22
11	16 September 1995	2 March 1996	24
12	28 September 1996	8 March 1997	24
13	20 September 1997	14 March 1998	26
14	21 November 1998	15 May 1999	24
15	20 November 1999	13 May 2000	24
16	18 November 2000	5 May 2001	24
17	10 November 2001	1 June 2002	26
18	19 October 2002	31 May 2003	27

==== Specials ====
Date	Entitle
29 July 1989	The Best of Blind Date
22 September 1990	The Best of Blind Date
9 February 1991	The Best of Blind Date
20 October 1991	Blind Date Wedding of the Year
21 December 1991	Blind Date Christmas Cracker
25 December 1992	Christmas Blind Date
1 January 1994	The Best of Blind Date
12 February 1994	Wedding & Best of the Rest
31 December 1994	10th Anniversary Show
13 September 1997	Blind Date Exclusive
20 June 1999	Blind Date Wedding 1998
25 December 2002	Blind Date Christmas Special

=== Channel 5 ===
Series	Start date	End date	Episodes
1	17 June 2017	23 December 2017	7
2	30 December 2017	3 February 2018	6
3	16 June 2018	29 December 2018	10
4	7 April 2019	16 June 2019	10

== Transmissions ==
=== Original ===
==== Series 14 ====
Episode no.	Air date	Viewers (millions)	ITV weekly ranking
1	21 November 1998	8.81	18
2	28 November 1998	8.86	20
3	5 December 1998	9.17	17
4	12 December 1998	8.95	17
5	19 December 1998	9.06	14
6	2 January 1999	8.52	20
7	9 January 1999	9.70	25
8	16 January 1999	9.48	24
9	23 January 1999	9.67	17
10	30 January 1999	9.83	13
11	6 February 1999	9.96	13
12	13 February 1999	9.70	13
13	20 February 1999	9.82	13
14	27 February 1999	9.82	15
15	6 March 1999	10.27	16
16	13 March 1999	8.13	26
17	20 March 1999	8.56	20
18	27 March 1999	8.29	19
19	3 April 1999	8.41	15
20	10 April 1999	8.12	18
21	17 April 1999	8.69	15
22	24 April 1999	7.84	17
23	8 May 1999	8.19	14
24	15 May 1999	7.90	17

==== Series 15 ====
Episode no.	Air date	Viewers (millions)	ITV weekly ranking
1	20 November 1999	10.05	16
2	27 November 1999	10.21	9
3	4 December 1999	9.58	13
4	11 December 1999	9.78	9
5	18 December 1999	9.85	11
6	1 January 2000	7.74	19
7	8 January 2000	8.93	16
8	15 January 2000	8.14	21
9	22 January 2000	9.39	20
10	29 January 2000	8.88	14
11	5 February 2000	8.93	14
12	12 February 2000	8.26	21
13	19 February 2000	9.00	15
14	26 February 2000	9.60	10
15	4 March 2000	9.51	13
16	18 March 2000	9.11	11
17	25 March 2000	8.47	15
18	1 April 2000	8.80	20
19	8 April 2000	8.97	16
20	15 April 2000	8.71	12
21	22 April 2000	7.81	15
22	29 April 2000	7.10	17
23	6 May 2000	7.21	20
24	13 May 2000	6.77	17

==== Series 16 ====
Episode no.	Air date	Viewers (millions)	ITV weekly ranking
1	18 November 2000	8.39	19
2	25 November 2000	8.27	20
3	2 December 2000	8.37	26
4	9 December 2000	8.07	21
5	16 December 2000	8.06	15
6	23 December 2000	7.31	21
7	30 December 2000	8.62	20
8	6 January 2001	8.13	22
9	13 January 2001	8.65	18
10	20 January 2001	8.79	20
11	27 January 2001	8.98	19
12	3 February 2001	9.19	18
13	17 February 2001	7.98	22
14	24 February 2001	8.30	19
15	3 March 2001	8.20	21
16	10 March 2001	8.33	16
17	17 March 2001	8.17	18
18	24 March 2001	7.39	24
19	31 March 2001	7.29	21
20	7 April 2001	7.46	20
21	14 April 2001	7.00	22
22	21 April 2001	7.58	18
23	28 April 2001	7.20	22
24	5 May 2001	6.36	24

==== Series 17 ====
Episode no.	Air date	Viewers (millions)	ITV weekly ranking
1	10 November 2001	7.11	19
2	17 November 2001	7.14	19
3	24 November 2001	7.66	18
4	1 December 2001	7.77	17
5	8 December 2001	7.46	18
6	15 December 2001	7.58	19
7	22 December 2001	6.64	18
8	29 December 2001	7.41	16
9	5 January 2002	7.03	19
10	12 January 2002	6.40	19
11	19 January 2002	6.71	18
12	26 January 2002	7.73	17
13	2 February 2002	7.21	18
14	16 February 2002	6.49	19
15	23 February 2002	6.41	21
16	2 March 2002	6.38	18
17	9 March 2002	6.15	20
18	16 March 2002	6.53	17
19	23 March 2002	6.03	18
20	6 April 2002	5.90	19
21	13 April 2002	5.13	21
22	20 April 2002	5.36	22
23	4 May 2002	4.69	20
24	18 May 2002	4.60	24
25	25 May 2002	5.31	19
26	1 June 2002	Under 3.88	Outside Top 30

==== Series 18 ====
Episode no.	Air date	Viewers (millions)	ITV weekly ranking
1	19 October 2002	5.69	22
2	26 October 2002	5.53	23
3	2 November 2002	5.81	23
4	9 November 2002	6.11	23
5	16 November 2002	5.93	23
6	23 November 2002	6.04	22
7	30 November 2002	5.05	25
8	7 December 2002	5.18	25
9	14 December 2002	5.25	26
10	21 December 2002	5.39	24
11	28 December 2002	5.90	17
12	4 January 2003	6.77	18
13	11 January 2003	5.87	22
14	18 January 2003	5.31	26
15	25 January 2003	5.23	26
16	1 February 2003	5.01	28
17	8 February 2003	Under 5.21	Outside Top 30
18	15 February 2003	6.17	19
19	22 February 2003	4.44	30
20	1 March 2003	4.55	30
21	8 March 2003	4.26	30
22	15 March 2003	Under 4.78	Outside Top 30
23	22 March 2003	Under 5.00	Outside Top 30
24	10 May 2003	Under 5.15	Outside Top 30
25	17 May 2003	Under 3.95	Outside Top 30
26	24 May 2003	Under 4.23	Outside Top 30
27	31 May 2003	Under 3.52	Outside Top 30

=== Revival ===
==== Series 1 ====
Episode no.	Air date	7 day viewers (millions)	28 day viewers (millions)	Channel 5 weekly ranking
1	17 June 2017	2.25	2.29	1
2	24 June 2017	1.67	1.71	3
3	1 July 2017	1.42	1.47	4
4	8 July 2017	1.14	1.21	12
5	15 July 2017	1.14	1.15	11
6	22 July 2017	1.38	1.40	5
7	23 December 2017	—N/a	—N/a	—N/a

==== Series 2 ====
Episode no.	Air date	7 day viewers (millions)	28 day viewers (millions)	Channel 5 weekly ranking
1	30 December 2017	1.17	1.25	8
2	6 January 2018	0.89	0.97	18
3	13 January 2018	0.88	0.91	23
4	20 January 2018	1.04	1.05	12
5	27 January 2018	0.84	0.87	21
6	3 February 2018	0.80	0.82	20

==== Series 3 ====
Episode no.	Air date	7 day viewers (millions)	28 day viewers (millions)	Channel 5 weekly ranking
1	16 June 2018	0.73	0.76	19
2	23 June 2018	0.68	0.70	20
3	30 June 2018	0.61	0.62	24
4	21 July 2018	1.09	1.09	5
5	28 July 2018	1.08	1.09	4
6	4 August 2018	1.13	1.14	9
7	11 August 2018	1.16	1.17	2
8	18 August 2018	1.06	1.07	7
9	22 December 2018	1.00	1.03	8
10	29 December 2018	1.17	1.19	8

==== Series 4 ====
Episode no.	Air date	7 day viewers (millions)	28 day viewers (millions)	Channel 5 weekly ranking
1	7 April 2019	0.75	0.76	15
2	14 April 2019	—N/a	—N/a	—N/a
3	21 April 2019	0.59	—N/a	22
4	28 April 2019	0.96	0.98	9
5	5 May 2019	0.83	0.85	14
6	12 May 2019	—N/a	—N/a	—N/a
7	19 May 2019	0.79	—N/a	15
8	2 June 2019	—N/a	TBC	TBC
9	9 June 2019	0.68	TBC	17
10	16 June 2019	TBC	TBC	TBC
