= Let's Do Lunch with Gino & Mel =

British television series

- Genre: Cookery, chat
- Presented by: Gino D'Acampo; Melanie Sykes
- Voices of: David Wartnaby (2014-2017)
- Country of origin: United Kingdom
- No. of series: 4
- No. of episodes: 88

Production
- Production location: The London Studios
- Running time: 60 minutes (inc. adverts)
- Production company: ITV Studios

Original release
- Network: ITV
- Release: 8 August 2011 – 2 September 2017

Related
- ITV Food

Let's Do Lunch with Gino & Mel is a British daytime television programme which aired live on ITV from 2011 until 2017 as part of ITV Food, presented by Gino D'Acampo and Melanie Sykes. D'Acampo cooks various food items, whilst Sykes does the main presenting of the show. The show mixed food with celebrity chat. In each episode, a celebrity guest appeared to assist the hosts and chat to them about their latest projects.

Alongside the main show aired a pre-recorded Christmas series known as Let's Do Christmas with Gino & Mel (2012–2017), which saw D'Acampo cooking Christmas food, still with celebrity guests and chat. There were three series of the Christmas show.

== Format ==
=== Gino's Masterclass ===
In some episodes, Gino shared his expertise with the viewers with his top tips on various topics. These included knife skills, tomatoes, bacon, pastry, pasta, rice, chicken, Yorkshire puddings, mashed potatoes, roast potatoes, sausages and meat.

=== Challenge Gino ===
In every episode, Gino had to take part in a food-related challenge. Some of them were attempts to get Gino a Guinness World Record. For the Christmas series, these tasks included Irish Coffee making, eating Brussels sprouts and making Chocolate truffles.

Sometimes there was no challenge, and etiquette expert William Hanson joined the show to talk about subjects such as Royal dining, wedding etiquette or restaurant manners.

In the first and second series, Gino's challenger received a tea towel with the printed text on it which says "I challenged Gino and all I got was this rubbish tea towel". In the third and fourth series, the challenger received a "Let's Do Lunch" lunchbox.

== Transmissions ==
Series	Start date	End date	Episodes
1	8 August 2011	2 September 2011	19
2	9 July 2012	31 August 2012	29
3	1 July 2013	26 July 2013	20
4	14 July 2014	8 August 2014	20

- Episodes aired daily at 12:30pm for an hour when Loose Women took their summer break

== Episode guide ==
=== Series 1 ===
Original air date	Celebrity guest	Gino's Challenge	Quick 5-minute recipe	Dish of the Day	Audience options/choice
8/8/2011	Martin Kemp	Onion volcano	Cheese sandwich	Italian pie and mash	Chicken in breadcrumbs with tomato salsa and spicy spinach (Won) Chicken in white wine and tomato sauce (Lost)
9/8/2011	Jane McDonald	Nettle Eating	'Whatever you've got in your fridge frittata'	Posh fish in pastry	Italian chocolate and nut cake (Won) Ice cream cake with nougat and amaretto (Lost)
10/8/2011	Peter Andre	Eating A raw Onion	Spaghetti Hoops and mash	Barbecue surf and turf with pasta salad	Italian-style spring rolls at your request (Won) Baked aubergines with spinach and Parmesan (Lost)
11/8/2011	Stefan Booth	Milking a Sheep	Spaghetti with courgette and lemon zest	Baked Alaska	Pizza vesuvio (Won) Lamb burgers with spicy tomato and red pepper relish (Lost)
12/8/2011	Joe Pasquale	—N/a	Toast	Italian bull's testicles	Roasted chicken with rosemary (Won) Roast Beef (Lost)
15/8/2011	Jason Donovan	Lemon eating- Mason "Clap Clap" Pye	Leftover chicken pasta	Steak with blue cheese sauce and chips	Salmon with lemon thyme crust and potato salad (Won) Fish pie (Lost)
16/8/2011	Craig Revel Horwood	Garlic Eating	Pea and parsley soup	Italian sausage and polenta mash	Apple cobbler pie (Won) Chicken pie (Lost)
17/8/2011	Jodie Prenger	To master sabrage	Five-spice beans on toast	Triple chocolate chilli brownie	Meatballs and pasta (Won) Salmon pasta bake (Lost)
18/8/2011	Christopher Biggins	Stack cups	Marmite mac and cheese	Calves liver with roasted cherry tomatoes	Chicken saltimbocca (Won) Sweet and sour pork chops with mustard mash (Lost)
19/8/2011	Debbie Rush	Drinking Ketchup	Tuna pasta with olives and cherry tomatoes	Strawberry pavlova	Roast lamb with lemon potatoes (Won) Roast rib of beef with honey and lemon zest (Lost)
22/8/2011	Alex James	Chilli Eating	Cheats' Shepherd's pie	Italian brunch	Italian chicken curry (Won) Chicken and prawn kebabs (Lost)
23/8/2011	Josie Gibson	Speed Milk Drinking	Borletti bean soup	Spicy chicken salad	Lamb hot pot (Won) Neapolitan meatloaf (Lost)
24/8/2011	Joe Swash	Noodle pulling	Lunch in a wrap	Spaghetti carbonara	Risotto balls with spicy tomato (Won) Italian-style paella (Lost)
25/8/2011	Tameka Empson	Latte art	Spaghetti with garlic, olive and chilli	Tiramisu	Italian toad-in-the-hole (Won) Creamy sausage ragu (Lost)
26/8/2011	Stacey Solomon	Speed Burger Eating	Prawn cocktail on crispy garlic bread	Chicken in chilli sauce with Mexican rice	Roast beef with mustard (Won) Pork in pastry (Lost)
30/8/2011	Michelle Collins	Cracking eggs	Corned Beef baguette	Seared salmon stir-fry	BBQ citrus and honey chicken (Won) BBQ lamb kebabs (Lost)
31/8/2011	Sally Lindsay	Tablecloth	Five-minute risotto	Pork chop cacciatore	Bacon, cheese and potato bake (Won) Chicken wrapped in bacon with butternut mash (Lost)
1/9/2011	Carol Vorderman	Oyster eating	Sausages with tomato sauce	Roasted sea bass with Italian salsa	Classic lasagne (Won) Italian-style fish bake (Lost)
2/9/2011	Beverley Knight	Make the most ravioli in two minutes^{A}	Tagliatelle in creamy tartare sauce	Swordfish with wild mushroom risotto	Spicy roast leg of lamb (Won) Roast pork belly (Lost)

^{A}Gino broke the Guinness World Record

=== Series 2 ===
Original air date	Celebrity guest(s)	Gino's Challenge	Quick 5-minute recipe	Dish of the Day	Audience options/Choice
9/7/2012	Jason Manford	Playing the red pepper and courgette Trumpet with the London vegetable orchestra	The "Ultimate" fish finger sandwich	Beef wellington	Honey lemon roasted chicken with potatoes and broccoli (Won) Caramelised lamb with butternut squash, mash and summer vegetables (Lost)
10/7/2012	Alex Jones	Guess the TV Commercial star	Tinned Soup	Fish in a bag with fennel and oranges	Chicken Kiev with hedgehog potatoes (Won) Chilli con carne (Lost)
11/7/2012	Theo Paphitis	Boning and slicing a smoked salmon	The "Perfect" Cheese Omelette	Smoky pan-fried squid with a chorizo and bean salad	Sticky toffee pudding with homemade banana ice cream (Won) Nutty chocolate meringue cake (Lost)
12/7/2012	Kerry Katona	Teppanyaki challenge	Pesto gnocchi with cream cheese	Healthy sweet and sour chicken with egg-fried rice	Fish stew with garlic croutons (Won) Crispy salmon with herb sauce (Lost)
13/7/2012	Cheryl Fergison	Pizza toppings	Pesto gnocchi with cream cheese	Moroccan vegetable pie	Creamy butternut squash with a warm salad (Won) Blue cheese and pine-nut risotto (Lost)
16/7/2012	Joanna Page	Pea shooting	Left-over chicken lasagne	Slow-cook beef curry	Pork wrapped in bacon with mustard sauce (Won) Lamb chops with homemade mint sauce (Lost)
17/7/2012	Claire Richards	Afternoon tea etiquette challenge with William Hanson	Tuna sandwich	Thai-style chicken burger	Four-cheese pasta bake (Won) Spaghetti bolognaise (Lost)
18/7/2012	Emma Bunton and Jade Jones	Japanese Ice Balls	Speedy minestrone with garlic croutons	Red velvet cake	Sticky ribs with corn on the cob and potato salad (Won) Mexican fajitas (Lost)
19/7/2012	Jenny Eclair	Walking on eggs	Sausage and bean casserole	Antipasto	Summer fish pie with a green bean and rocket salad (Won) Moussaka (Lost)
20/7/2012	Ann Widdecombe	Pizza Acrobatics	Mexican-styled fried eggs	Arctic Roll	Roasted pork with roast potatoes and red cabbage (Won) Summer roast beef with Tuscan beans (Lost)
23/7/2012	Joe Pasquale	Chopping carrots for a World Record	Eggy crumpets with ham and cheese	Flourless chocolate cake	Chinese chilli chicken with coriander rice (Won) Crispy beef noodle stir fry (Lost)
24/7/2012	Miriam Margolyes	Guess the TV Commercial star	Burritos	Crusty herb salmon with a chive and butter sauce	Spinach and ricotta cannelloni (Won) Cottage pie (Lost)
25/7/2012	Brian Dowling	Wine Glass Music	Salad with poached eggs	Summer BBQ	Steak and chips with peppercorn sauce (Won) Pork chop (Lost)
26/7/2012	Rav Wilding	The Science of Food	Chicken and bacon club sandwich	Healthy lamb samosas with green coconut chutney	Peach and white chocolate tart (Won) Roasted peach meringue roulade (Lost)
27/7/2012	Fatima Whitbread	Sugar Ribbon Pulling	Green vegetable curry	Olympic picnic	Chicken with tomato and tarragon sauce (Won) Roasted spatchcock chicken (Lost)
13/8/2012	Nick Knowles	Running across Custard	A philly cheese sandwich	Aubergine parmegiana	Chinese sweet and sour pork balls with coriander rice (Won) Chicken tagine with lemon couscous (Lost)
14/8/2012	Amy Childs	Malaysian Tea Pulling	Poor Man's Pasta	Feta cheese, watermelon and basil salad	Stuffed roast chicken thighs with sweet potato wedges (Won) Sausages braised in cider with garlic potatoes (Lost)
15/8/2012	Peter Andre	Guess the TV Commercial star	Loaded Nachos	Melting chocolate truffle cake with raspberries and cream	Traditional Calzone Napoletano pizza (Won) Spaghetti Tart (Lost)
16/8/2012	Eamonn Holmes and Ruth Langsford	Food Magic	Sweetcorn fritters with bacon, avocado and summer salsa	Surf and Turf	Gino's mum's upside down orange sponge (Won) Baked cheesecake with amaretto and raisins (Lost)
17/8/2012	Keith Lemon	Oral juggling	Simple Pasta Salad	Tomato bruschetta, chicken drumsticks and an Italian pasty	Salmon fishcakes with poached eggs and white wine sauce (Won) Eggs Royale with a cheats' hollandaise sauce (Lost)
20/8/2012	Charlene Tilton	Eating 6 hot wings^{B}	Leftover chicken kebabs	Rhubarb and custard tart with clotted cream	BBQ lamb with a pea and mint salad (Won) Chilli pesto fish fillets with green beans and new potatoes (Lost)
21/8/2012	Russell Grant	Guess the TV Commercial star	Fast spicy store-cupboard noodles	Roast chicken with 40 cloves of garlic with tagliatelle	Zingy lemon meringue pie (Won) A boozy summer trifle (Lost)
22/8/2012	Alex James	Carving potatoes	Cheesy peas on toast	Baked fish with summer roast vegetables	Strawberry shortcake stack with lemon curd ice cream (Won) Strawberry knickerbocker glory with brandy snap biscuits (Lost)
23/8/2012	Stacey Solomon	Chopping Peppers in a minute	Cheese and bean quesadillas	Spicy fish and chips with minty mushy peas and potato wedges	Turkey and basil meatballs with tomato sauce and bacon (Won) Bang bang turkey with warm broccoli and noodle salad (Lost)
24/8/2012	Rufus Hound	Making pottery with Ice Cream	Linguine puttanesca	Baked eggs with brie, mushrooms, spring onions and pancetta	The Ultimate cheeseburger (Won) Chicken korma (Lost)
28/8/2012	Jane McDonald	Eating a bowl of pasta for a World Record	Chicken with mustard and cream	Summer roast pork belly with apple salsa	Prawn chow mein noodles with sesame prawn toast (Won) Pasta shells with sausage and broccoli (Lost)
29/8/2012	Gemma Collins	No challenge, instead a Royal dining feature with William Hanson	Boston Baked Beans	Italian-style Paella	Chicken, bacon and mushroom stuffed crepes with a pea and radish salad (Won) Italian picnic pie (Lost)
30/8/2012	Lynda Bellingham	Guess the TV Commercial star	Corned Beef hash	Linguine vongole	Coconut prawn curry with garlic naan bread (Won) Thai Chicken soup with vegetable noodles (Lost)
31/8/2012	Alan Carr	Running across Custard for a World Record^{A}	Smoked mackerel kedgeree	Arrabiata meatloaf	Beer baked chicken with jewelled cous cous (Won) Artichoke and spinach tart with radish salad (Lost)

^{A}Gino broke the Guinness World Record
^{B}Gino did not attempt this challenge

=== Series 3 ===
Original air date	Celebrity guest(s)	Gino's Challenge	Quick 5-minute recipe	Dish of the Day	Audience options/Choice
1/7/2013	Ashley Roberts	Walk across 7 ft of broken wine bottles with bare feet	Hot chicken sandwich with quick coleslaw	Sticky chocolate and pecan brownies	Rib eye steak with blue cheese butter and onion rings (Won) Pork chops with mustard and cider sauce (Lost)
2/7/2013	Russell Kane	Eat 80g of Watercress in less than 49.68 seconds	Simple fluffy Omelette	Raspberry Ripple Cheesecake	Gino's Classic lasagne (Won) Gino's tagliatelle bolognese (Lost)
3/7/2013	Mollie King and Vanessa White	Wedding etiquette feature with William Hanson (no challenge)	Spaghetti al pomodoro crudo	Sticky banana and chocolate tart	Spicy prawns with tomato, garlic and herbs (Won) Summer fish pie (Lost)
4/7/2013	Rylan Clark	Wrap five bags of chips in less than 58.04 seconds	Loaded potato salad	American Pancakes	Spinach and ricotta cannelloni (Won) Plum and ricotta tart (Lost)
5/7/2013	Julian Clary	Eat a jam doughnut without licking his lips in less than 30.53 seconds	Prawn and Rocket pasta	Pineapple Upside Down cake	Butterflied leg of lamb with summer salsa (Won) Roasted pollock and potato puttanesca (Lost)
8/7/2013	Dominic Brunt	Magic Tricks Challenge	Spinach and watercress salad with bacon and pears	Cherry tomato and fennel fricotta	Strawberry and cream tart (Won) Strawberry and pistachio meringues (Lost)
9/7/2013	Richard Madeley	Eat a 12" pizza in less than 41.31 seconds	Poached eggs with Parmesan and pesto	Veal in lemon butter sauce	Summer chicken one pan cobbler (Won) Sticky pork and beans with coleslaw (Lost)
10/7/2013	Josie Gibson	Restaurant dining feature with William Hanson (no challenge)	Crunchy prawn baguette	Chocolate Mousse	Chinese Chicken hotpot (Won) Steak and Ale pie (Lost)
11/7/2013	John Barrowman	Whisk an egg to the stiff-peak stage faster than challenger	Chicken with peach flatbreads	Summer vegetable filo tart	Chocolate tiramisu trifle (Won) Creamy rice pot with amaretto and toasted almonds (Lost)
12/7/2013	Kim Woodburn	Cocktail tricks	Little pasta shells with Ham, egg and peas	Flamed pineapple with rum and coconut flakes	Roast pork belly with mashed potatoes (Won) Lemon roast chicken with mint and pea salad (Lost)
15/7/2013	Christian Jessen	Chinese dining etiquette feature with William Hanson (no challenge)	Spicy leftover pork salad	Super-light Lemon Drizzle cake	Chicken fajitas (Won) Summer clam and mussel stew with garlic bread (Lost)
16/7/2013	Emma Bunton	Carry 12 glasses (27.6 kg) of stein at the same time	Penne with creamy cheese and bacon	Chilli, salt and pepper squid	Hot chocolate Soufflé with raspberry sauce (Won) Mini Doughnuts (Lost)
17/7/2013	JB Gill	Decorate 45 cupcakes in the quickest time	Gazpacho	Simple chocolate macaroons	Peri peri chicken burger (Won) Chilli con carne (Lost)
18/7/2013	Emma Willis	Play a tune using glass bottles with the Junk band	Hot chicken Caesar salad	Death by Chocolate	Ultimate spicy pizza (Won) Spaghetti Tart (Lost)
19/7/2013	Rav Wilding	Date night etiquette feature with William Hanson (no challenge)	Herbed salmon with garlic cream sauce	Chocolate banana bread	Pulled pork with barbecue sauce (Won) Summer Roast Beef (Lost)
22/7/2013	Rufus Hound	The most ice lollies eaten in 30 seconds	Grilled avocado with sweetcorn	Horsemeat burgers stuffed with talegio cheese	Cookies and Cream semifreddo (Won) Lemon and Mango tart (Lost)
23/7/2013	Deborah Meaden	The most hotdogs made in one minute	Quesadillas	Speedy strawberry ice cream	Pastitsio (Won) Squid with fennel and tomato (Lost)
24/7/2013	Lee Ryan and Antony Costa	Royal Christenings/etiquette feature with William Hanson (no challenge)	Pea, Ham and Mint Salad	Peach Melba with Brandy snap baskets	Banana Bread and Butter Pudding (Won) Focaccia 3 Ways (Lost)
25/7/2013	Jane McDonald	Make the most ravioli in two minutes^{A}	Fish & Chips	Sparkling Pimms Jelly	Sticky BBQ chicken and ribs (Won) Crabcakes with roasted red pepper sauce (Lost)
26/7/2013	Martin Kemp	Clay pigeon shooting	Sausage and mushroom tagliatelle	Salmon carpaccio	Chocolate meringue cake (Won) Summer fruit champagne sundae with shortbread (Lost)

^{A}Gino broke the Guinness World Record

=== Series 4 ===
Original Air Date	Celebrity guest(s)	Gino/Mel's Challenge	Quick 5 Minute Recipe	Dish Of The Day	Audience options/Choice
14/7/2014	Keith Lemon	Making a lemon out of sugar in under one minute	Pick-me-up pasta	Chicken schnitzel with potato salad	Baked Lemon and Raspberry Cheesecake (Won) Cherry and Pistachio Meringue (Lost)
15/7/2014	Keith Duffy	Make ten 10" pizzas in one minute	Toasted ham and cheese quesadilla with sweet tomato salsa	Irish cream panna cotta with espresso caramel	Crab tortellini with burnt butter and lemon sauce (Won) Crispy fried squid with homemade chilli jam (Lost)
16/7/2014	Michelle Collins	Making a sushi prawn roll in less than 38 seconds	Pea and mint soup with crispy tortilla croutons	Citrus trout with chickpea salad	Mamma's bolognese with roasted tomato sauce (Won) Chicken and mushroom open lasagne (Lost)
17/7/2014	Sharron Davies	Make a wedding cake for Gary and Jo in less than two minutes	Smoked mackerel salad with warm beetroots and horseradish dressing	Venison sausages with Puttanesca sauce and fennel	Gino's caprese cake^{A}
18/7/2014	Alfie Boe	Pull as many pints as he can in one minute	Garlic mushroom toast with oozing Taleggio cheese	Summer chicken pie	Sticky pork with coleslaw and chilli corn-on-the-cob (Won) Roasted duck legs with sesame roasted peaches (Lost)
21/7/2014	Alan Carr	Crush a barrel of grapes in less than 60 seconds	Bubble and squeak cakes with fried eggs	Posh chicken kebab with chilli dressing	Fiery chilli con carne (Won) Marinated lamb chops with Moroccan spiced Bulgar wheat (Lost)
22/7/2014	Suzi Perry	Make as many fruit sticks as they can in less than two minutes	Warm pear and blue cheese salad	Roasted apricots with pistachio and cardamom biscotti	Tomato tart tatin (Won) Pan-fried grey mullet with cherry tomato couscous and green olive tapenade (Lost)
23/7/2014	Jodie Prenger	Make as many ravioli as possible in one minute	Bang bang chicken with radish and cucumber salad	Nice and spicy Thai prawn curry	Raspberry and prosecco jelly with lemon ice cream (Won) Creamy rice pots with peaches (Lost)
24/7/2014	Katie Derham	Making cocktails	Lemon and courgette salmon pasta	Mini sponge cakes	Baked sea bass in thyme salt^{A}
25/7/2014	Peter Andre	Making a nine plait loaf of bread in the fastest time	Herb pancakes with avocado and bacon	Gino's BBQ desserts	Pot roasted whole chicken with chorizo (Won) Summer roast beef (Lost)
28/7/2014	Iwan Thomas	Scotch egg relay in two minutes	Panzanella salad	Pimped up hot dogs	Vanilla creme brulee with summer berries (Won) Mango tart (Lost)
29/7/2014	Rufus Hound	Milking a cow	Gnocchi with blue cheese sauce	Pulled pork pizza	Summer chicken stew with lemon and white wine (Won) Summer fish pie (Lost)
30/7/2014	Carol Decker	Build the top of a Croquembouche	Deviled egg salad	Chicken Kiev	Black forest gateau (Won) Pineapple upside down cake (Lost)
31/7/2014	Adam Hills	Pasty crimping	Tomato, apple and mozzarella stack	Lamb koftas with homemade hummus, flatbreads and pickled beetroot	Gnocchi with courgettes in butter and sage sauce^{A}
1/8/2014	Natasha Kaplinsky	Pulling as many 99 ice creams in one minute	Cajun pork with sweetcorn salsa	Mississippi Mud Pie	Summer vegetable risotto (Won) Aubergine Parmigiana (Lost)
4/8/2014	Charlotte Hawkins and Ben Shephard	Filling as many doughnuts with jam as possible in one minute	Sticky BBQ chicken with quick new potato salad	Sub-roll sticks	Strawberry and white chocolate millefeuille (Won) Sweet apricot tart (Lost)
5/8/2014	Anastacia	Making as many balls of Arancini in one minute	Griddled asparagus, poached egg and salmon with a lemon dressing	Sliced sirloin steak with Italian roast potatoes and tomato & mozzarella salsa	Chicken with a porcini mushroom sauce and wild rice (Won) Herby chicken meatballs with a coconut and noodle broth (Lost)
6/8/2014	Samia Ghadie	Fill 30 macrons in the fastest time	Chicken, cous cous and orange salad	Crab and apple tart with apple salad	Baked Alaska with Summer fruits (Won) Meringue with summer fruits (Lost)
7/8/2014	Louis Smith and Adam Ant	Cutting as many slices of pata negra ham in one minute	Griddled peach salad and mozzarella wrapped in pancetta	Caribbean spiced monkfish	Mel's Mum's Chicken Biryiani^{A}
8/8/2014	Martin Kemp	Making as many sticks of candy floss in 90 seconds	Pasta with spinach, watercress and rocket pesto	Gino's Pastilla	Slow roasted belly of pork with creamy cannellini beans (Won) Lemon and green olive roast chicken (Lost)

^{A}These episodes were pre-recorded and therefore there were no audience options, so Gino cooked set dishes instead.

== Let's Do Christmas with Gino & Mel ==
Let's Do Christmas with Gino & Mel
- Presented by: Melanie Sykes; Gino D'Acampo
- Voices of: David Wartnaby (2014-2016)
- No. of series: 5
- No. of episodes: 50

Original release
- Network: ITV
- Release: 10 December 2012 – 23 December 2016

Let's Do Christmas with Gino & Mel was a Christmas spin-off of Let's Do Lunch, which aired on ITV from 2012 until 2016. The series showed viewers how to cook easy meals during the Christmas period. Much like the regular series, Let's Do Christmas was hosted by D'Acampo and Sykes, along with a celebrity guest appearing in each episode. This, unlike the main series, was pre-recorded and not broadcast live.

There were several changes made to the studio set and format such as Christmas decorations that appear on the usual set. The series are pre-recorded at The London Studios in the summer of each year. As episodes were not broadcast live, the viewers recipe vote was dropped. In its place, Gino made another dish.

Let's Do Christmas has not returned to television since its third series in 2014. There was no fourth series in 2015, A re-run aired in place.

=== Transmissions ===
Series	Start date	End date	Episodes
1	10 December 2012	21 December 2012	10
2	15 December 2013	24 December 2013	10
3	8 December 2014	19 December 2014	10

=== Series 1 ===
Air date	Celebrity guest	Gino's challenge	Recipes
10/12/2012	David Gest	Making more Irish coffees than the challenger in a minute	Cheat's Christmas Pudding • Prawn and Crab Cocktail • Slow Roasted Vegetable Soup • Leftover Turkey and Ham Pie
11/12/2012	Christopher Biggins	Eating as many Brussels Sprouts in a minute^{A}	Roast Cola Ham • Baked camembert • Quick Salmon pate • Chocolate orange mousse cake
12/12/2012	Oz Clarke	Christmas party etiquette feature with William Hanson (no challenge)	Baked Big Breakfast • Perfect Roast Potatoes • Christmas roast beef with thyme onions
13/12/2012	Louie Spence	Decorating a Gingerbread House in 90 seconds	Vegetarian Christmas Wellington • Parsnip and Parmesan mash • Peas and pancetta • Christmas panettone trifle
14/12/2012	Sherrie Hewson	Making Japanese Christmas Decorations	Turkey curry and festive rice • Cheese and marmite straws • Crostini with blue cheese dressing • Christmas Roast Pork
17/12/2012	Anton Du Beke	Eating 3 Mince Pies in a minute^{A}	Fried Christmas pudding with clotted cream • Homemade piccalilli • Apple and rosemary jelly • Mulled Wine
18/12/2012	Jodie Prenger	Playing a Christmas song on Handbells	Turkey and cranberry risotto • Festive sprout gratin • Festive Fruit punch • Ice cream bombe
19/12/2012	Craig Revel Horwood	Making a Christmas wreath in a minute	Leftover cheese board fondue • Sticky red cabbage with apples and cider • Orange glazed baby carrots and onions • Seafood platter with saffron and lime mayonnaise
20/12/2012	Rhod Gilbert	Carving a turkey in 90 seconds	Christmas pork terrine • Mustard glazed chicken wings • Baked Stilton mushrooms
21/12/2012	Paul Nicholas	Making more than forty chocolate truffles in 2 minutes^{B}	No bake Irish liqueur cheesecake • Smoked salmon and herb roulade

^{A}Gino attempted to break the Guinness World Record but failed
^{B}Gino broke the Guinness World Record

=== Series 2 ===
Air date	Celebrity guest(s)	Gino's challenge	Recipes
15/12/2013	Cheryl Fergison	Most bottles of champagne opened in one minute^{B}	Seafood platter • Christmas pinwheels with sundried-tomatoes and feta • Pea and pecorino crostini • Chocolate Christmas pudding with brandy custard and salted caramel ice cream
16/12/2013	Sally Lindsay	Pour a glass of champagne and make a cocktail whilst being upside down	Last minute Christmas cake • Leftover turkey and ham pie • Roast goose with port and orange gravy
17/12/2013	Christopher Biggins	Open a bottle of port using a feather	Festive pork wellington • Make-ahead gravy • Christmas pudding soufflé
18/12/2013	Shane Filan	Christmas etiquette feature with William Hanson (no challenge)	Roast crown of lamb with mint jelly • Apricot, chilli and walnut stuffing • Hot gingerbread punch • Profiteroles with chocolate sauce
19/12/2013	Melanie C and Matt Cardle	Most jumpers put on in one minute^{A}	Christmas fish soup • Cranberry glazed sausages with mustard mayonnaise • Dressed mozzarella balls with parma ham • Bread sauce • Leftover turkey enchiladas
20/12/2013	Craig Revel Horwood	Fastest time to decorate a Christmas tree^{A}	Black forest gateau trifle • Sautéed sprouts with almonds and lemon • Maple and cayenne roasted parsnips • Roast pork with pear gravy
21/12/2013	Joe Pasquale	Fill four sherry glasses using a Valencia	Slow roast leg of lamb with braised peas • Ham hock and parsley terrine • Mulled cider • Chocolate honeycomb mousse cake
22/12/2013	Bruno Tonioli	Christmas etiquette feature with William Hanson (no challenge)	Filo mince pies • Sweet chilli prawn bites • Stilton and apple crostini • Horseradish sauce • Roast rib of beef inside a giant Yorkshire pudding
23/12/2013	Oz Clarke	Oral juggling, play the tune of "Jingle Bells"	Baked mustard and ginger ham with pineapple chutney • Potted shrimps • Christmas clementine pavlova
24/12/2013	Billy Ocean	Most jumpers put on in one minute^{B}	Christmas Roast Turkey • Homemade Cranberry sauce • Vegetable terrine with roasted garlic bread • Italian roast potatoes with carrots in tarragon and garlic with pigs in blankets^{1}

^{A}Gino attempted to break the Guinness World Record but failed
^{B}Gino broke the Guinness World Record

=== Series 3 ===
Air date	Celebrity guest(s)	Gino's challenge	Recipes
8/12/2014	Catherine Tyldesley	Make three Yule logs in under 90 seconds	Smoked Salmon Fishcakes with lemon crème fraiche • Fillet of Beef with Mushroom Rarebit topping • Porchetta
9/12/2014	Elaine Paige	Serving six guests	Pan-fried figs wrapped in parma ham • Cheats three bird roast • Tiramisu cake
10/12/2014	Warwick Davis	Make a layered Kransekage cake in one minute	Spicy sprout rice with griddled prawns • Apple and blackberry crumble with boozy custard • Salmon Coulibiac
11/12/2014	Jason Gardiner	Make 9 Christmas canapés	Quick Broccoli and Cauliflower soup with crispy chestnuts • Pimped up mince pies • Open Vegan Lasagna
12/12/2014	Ashley Roberts	Make a Christmas cocktail	Pomegranate and cranberry cous cous salad with chicken • Emergency hearty canapés • Ham with pear and cider sauce
15/12/2014	Theo Paphitis	The most nuts cracked and dipped in chocolate within one minute	Brick-turkey with balsamic red onions • Mexican eggs • Venison with a rich brandy and porcini mushroom sauce
16/12/2014	Aled Jones and Tom Chambers	Decorate a cupcake with a snowman made of icing and liquorice in under one minute	Kale and pancetta potato cakes • Slow cooked beef brisket • Christmas pudding trifle
17/12/2014	Zoë Wanamaker		Quick risotto with smoked haddock • Chicken tarragon Christmas crackers • Pulled lamb shoulder with winter coleslaw
18/12/2014	Simon Callow	Making decorations with vegetables	Creamy sprout and leek stroganoff • Coddled eggs • Roasted pheasant crown with spiced red cabbage
19/12/2014	Mark Foster	Dressed in a Christmas pudding suit picking presents	Roast turkey and all the sticky trimmings
