= Paul O'Grady Live =

British comedy chat show

- Genre: Entertainment
- Directed by: Steve Smith
- Presented by: Paul O'Grady
- Voices of: Jon Briggs; Marc Silk
- Country of origin: United Kingdom
- Original language: English
- No. of series: 2
- No. of episodes: 22

Production
- Executive producers: Claire Horton; Paul O'Grady
- Producers: Natalie Walker; Chris Weller
- Production location: The London Studios
- Running time: 60 minutes (inc. adverts)
- Production company: Olga TV

Original release
- Network: ITV
- Release: 10 September 2010 – 8 July 2011

Related
- The Paul O'Grady Show; The 5 O'Clock Show

Paul O'Grady Live is a British comedy chat show hosted by Paul O'Grady, that began airing on 10 September 2010 on ITV.

The show is a Friday night chat show that features a mixture of celebrity guests, airing at 21:00. The show culminates with different Vegas-style acts or music artist performing live on the show. The show has averaged 3.74 million viewers.

Series one of the programme finished on 12 November 2010, although a Christmas special aired on 24 December 2010. The show's second series began on 15 April 2011 and ended on 8 July 2011.

== History ==
O'Grady previously presented The Paul O'Grady Show, which was a huge success due to its variety of speciality acts and high-profile celebrity guests. The show featured comic stunts, musical performances, and occasionally viewer competitions. It ran for eight series on Channel 4 and three on ITV. Paul O'Grady Live is similar in format, but more adult-themed.

== Episodes ==
=== Series 1 ===
#	Original Air Date	Guests	Ratings (millions)
1	10 September 2010	Dawn French, Tom Jones, JLS and Spelbound	3.79
2	17 September 2010	Enrique Iglesias, Nicole Scherzinger, Kim Cattrall and Peter Kay	3.69
3	24 September 2010	Kylie Minogue, Jo Brand, Bob Hoskins and Jake Shears	3.57
4	1 October 2010	Michael Parkinson, Russell Brand, Louie Spence and Plan B	3.35
5	8 October 2010	Robbie Williams and Gary Barlow, David Tennant and Dannii Minogue	4.25
6	15 October 2010	Michael McIntyre, Harry Hill, Kate Thornton and Joe McElderry	3.62
7	22 October 2010	Chris Evans, Louis Walsh, Simon Pegg and Taylor Swift	3.33
8	29 October 2010	Barbara Windsor, Caroline Rhea and Nadine Coyle	3.53
9	5 November 2010	David Walliams, Barbara Knox and McFly	4.01
10	12 November 2010	Julie Walters, Leslie Jordan, Katy Perry and Diversity	4.02
Christmas special	24 December 2010	Bette Midler, Danny Miller, Cilla Black, David Haye, and The Soldiers	5.47

=== Series 2 ===
#	Original Air Date	Guests	Ratings (millions)
1	15 April 2011	Amanda Holden, John Cleese, Charlotte Church and Rupert Everett	4.16
2	22 April 2011	Amir Khan, Brenda Blethyn, Tracie Bennett and Antony Cotton	3.07
3	29 April 2011	Alan Carr, Stacey Solomon, Dame Edna Everage and Blue	3.17
4	6 May 2011	James Corden, Ross Kemp, Charlie Brooks, Karen Gillan and The Feeling	3.27
5	13 May 2011	Kathy Burke, Celia Imrie, Paddy McGuinness and The Black Eyed Peas	3.29
6	20 May 2011	Matt Lucas, Katherine Kelly, Michael Ball and Westlife	3.75
7	27 May 2011	Johnny Vegas, Suranne Jones, Joan Collins and Olly Murs	3.55
Lady Gaga Special	17 June 2011	Lady Gaga	3.55
8	24 June 2011	Victoria Wood, Sally Lindsay and Barry Manilow	2.86
9	1 July 2011	Lisa Maxwell, Bob Geldof, Janet Jackson and Joe Jonas	3.04
10	8 July 2011	Ian McKellen, Myleene Klass, Michelle Collins and Nicola Roberts	3.37

== Ratings ==
Most episodes throughout the show's first series averaged over 3 million viewers. Series one averaged 3.87 million viewers. Series two averaged 3.37 million viewers.
