= Howard Griffiths (presenter) =

British television and radio presenter

Howard Griffiths is a British television and radio presenter and Live Event Host.

His broadcast career started on board Concorde en route to New York City reporting for BBC Radio 5's Rave programme, presented by Gary Slaymaker and Rob Brydon. Howard's popularity in Wales led to appearances on numerous radio and television programmes on BBC and ITV, including fronting his own travel series for ITV Wales which ran for two 8 part series 2002 - 2003 and hosted a live phone in programme at BBC Radio Wales from 2003. Howard was a picker on ITV's Blind Date in 1993. The first and second shows attracted 16 and 17 million viewers. He appeared on Best of Blind Date in 1994 and Best of the Last 10 years of Blind Date 1995.

Griffiths appeared on the TV game show Family Fortunes, hosted by Les Dennis. The family reached the final where he teamed up with brother Gareth. They won a helicopter ride, technology & cash, but not the car.

In November 1998, Griffiths ran the New York Marathon with Falklands War veteran Simon Weston OBE, reporting for BBC Choice TV and BBC Radio Wales. August 1999 he presented in total darkness, live coverage of the eclipse for BBC Radio Wales, 10,000 feet above Cornwall. He was BBC Wales' man in the Dome on the Millennium Falcon, for BBC's Leaving the 20th Century.

Griffiths has presented television programmes for the BBC, ITV, NHS and Ideal World, the TV shopping channel. He voiced "Viewers Letters" on "Points of View" BBC ONE with Terry Wogan and Jeremy Vine for many years. He fronted the Woolite £10 million television commercial campaign in the UK in 2008. On 7 July 2009 he reported live from Los Angeles at Michael Jackson's Memorial Service inside the Staples Centre for BBC. He's an ambassador for numerous charities, hosts events across the country.

Throughout 2015 Griffiths appeared on BBC 2 "Victoria Derbyshire Programme", ITV2 " All About The Bants", ITVBe "The Only Way Is Essex" and November 2015 Howard became a Host on series 2 of "Dance Mums with Jennifer Ellison" ITV Shiver - Lifetime UK, USA & Australia.

January 2016 Griffiths appeared on Channel 4 "Come Dine With Me". He cooked "Cockahoop Hot Cockle Soup", "Shepherd's Delight" and served a "Homemade Icecream Cake" made with banana and strawberries that looked like a dog pooh. Howard appeared on ITV "It Will Be Alright On The Night" Summer 2016. On 5 February 2017 Howard Griffiths made his first appearance on Channel 5 - "When Live TV Goes Horribly Wrong". He was a guest talking about the TV clips from around the World & the pitfalls of appearing on Live TV.

February 2017 Griffiths was a guest on a number of BBC Radio Channels, including BBC Radio 5 Live and BBC Radio Wales, talking about the return of the TV programme "Blind Date" on Channel 5. Howard was a Picker on the original ITV programme with Cilla Black in 1993.

August 2017 Howard's London Underground reunion story with the woman he picked on Blind Date 25 years before went viral online, Radio, TV, National Newspapers & Magazines. TV appearances included ITV Evening News & ITV Good Morning Britain.

Griffiths has appeared on Channel 5's Television series " When......Goes Horribly Wrong " and appeared on numerous ITV " This Morning " fashion features. Howard's current special projects include hosting Live Events, contributing to radio & television programmes & TV Advert production & presentation.
