= The 5 O'Clock Show =

- Title card
- Genre: Entertainment
- Presented by: Various
- Voices of: Peter Dickson
- Country of origin: United Kingdom
- No. of series: 1
- No. of episodes: 40

Production
- Executive producer: Robert Gray
- Production locations: The London Studios; Stealth at Thorpe Park
- Running time: 60 mins (inc. advertisements)
- Production company: Olga TV

Original release
- Network: Channel 4
- Release: 31 May – 23 July 2010

Related
- The Paul O'Grady Show; Paul O'Grady Live

The 5 O'Clock Show is a daytime television chat show on Channel 4, replacing The Paul O'Grady Show. The format was along the same lines as O'Grady's show and consisted of a mixture of celebrity guests, comic stunts and musical performances. Monday to Wednesday's shows tended to be broadcast live, while Thursday and Friday were recorded on Tuesday and Wednesday. The show was broadcast from Studio 3 of The London Studios. The show was axed by Channel 4 on 7 September 2010.

== History ==
Originally Peter Andre was supposed to be the full-time presenter, but due to other commitments he was unable to fill all the slots. Channel 4 decided to change the format, to have a range of guest hosts filling in. Starting with Lenny Henry's stint, the show's title was altered to Presenter's 5 O'Clock Show.

== Guest presenters ==
Each week the show was hosted by guest presenters.

Week	Monday	Tuesday	Wednesday	Thursday	Friday
1	Peter Andre				
2	Peter Andre				
3	Natalie Cassidy	Phil Spencer and Kirstie Allsopp		Kimberley Walsh and Stephen Mulhern	
4	Lenny Henry				
5	Denise van Outen and Melanie Sykes				
6	Vernon Kay				
7	Fern Britton				
8	Fern Britton				

== Sponsors ==
The 5 O'Clock Show with was sponsored by Anglian Windows.
