= Today with Des and Mel =

British television series

- Genre: Chat show
- Presented by: Des O'Connor; Melanie Sykes
- Country of origin: United Kingdom
- Original language: English

Production
- Running time: 60 minutes
- Production companies: Carlton Television (2002–04); Granada Productions (2004–06); ITV Productions (2006)

Original release
- Network: ITV
- Release: 30 September 2002 – 12 May 2006

Related
- Live with Regis and Kelly

Today with Des and Mel is a British chat show that aired on ITV from 30 September 2002 to 12 May 2006 and was hosted by Des O'Connor and Melanie Sykes.

The show featured celebrity guests, phone-in competitions and chat between the hosts. It was loosely based on the format of the popular American television show, Live with Regis and Kelly.

Although the filming pattern varied, for much of the show's run, Monday's, Tuesday's, and Wednesday's programmes were recorded 'as live' very shortly before start of transmission (typically being recorded about half an hour prior), while Thursday's and Friday's episodes were pre-recorded in a separate block on Wednesdays.

The series pulled in extremely high ratings for its daytime slot, and as a result at one stage, the show was given the green light for an evening version to be made. For a brief time in early 2005, the show appeared in a 5pm slot, but this was soon dropped, and a full prime-time version never came about.

== Guest presenters ==
Paul O'Grady was a regular guest presenter, with ITV bosses being so impressed with his performance, that they gave him his own show - The Paul O'Grady Show (the show later moved to Channel 4 from 2006 to 2009 before returning to ITV in 2013). Other guest presenters include Dale Winton of Supermarket Sweep, Bradley Walsh of Wheel of Fortune and the first-ever Countdown host Richard Whiteley OBE also covered for Des on occasion. Jenny Powell – who contributed a regular Friday feature describing various tasks for the show that she had undertaken that week, which was dropped a while into the show's run – occasionally covered for Mel.

On 3 November 2008 and 8 April 2009, both Des and Mel filled in as guest hosts on The Paul O'Grady Show whilst Paul had time off. O'Grady had requested their use in this capacity as he felt indebted to the pair for playing a role in him being awarded his own show.
