= Going Out with Alan Carr =

British television show

- Genre: Music, chat
- Running time: 120 minutes (6:00pm – 8:00pm)
- Country of origin: United Kingdom
- Language: English
- Home station: BBC Radio 2
- Hosted by: Alan Carr; Melanie Sykes (2010–12); Emma Forbes (2009–10)
- Recording studio: Western House, London
- Original release: 25 April 2009 – 31 March 2012
- Audio format: 88–91 FM, DAB digital radio, TV and online
- Website: Official BBC website

Going Out with Alan Carr is the incarnation of the Saturday evening show on BBC Radio 2 between 25 April 2009 and 31 March 2012, produced by Open Mike Productions, which also produced Carr's TV series Chatty Man. It was hosted by British comedian Alan Carr, first with Emma Forbes and then with Melanie Sykes.

The final show was broadcast on 31 March 2012, after Carr announced his departure from the network earlier that month, stating that he wanted to reclaim his weekends. They were replaced by Liza Tarbuck on 12 May that year.

== History ==
The show was launched on 25 April 2009, and was originally presented by Carr alongside Emma Forbes. Forbes unexpectedly quit the show and wider radio station in April 2010 when, after requesting a holiday, the BBC refused her request to present Going Out as usual, despite Melanie Sykes having already been recruited as a stand-in presenter. Sykes was confirmed as Forbes's replacement in May 2010. The final show was broadcast on 31 March 2012, following Carr's decision earlier that month to leave the network. They were both replaced on 12 May that year by Liza Tarbuck.

Since the show ended, Carr and Sykes have returned as a duo to the station as guest hosts, most notably standing in for Graham Norton on his Saturday morning show during the summers of 2017 to 2020, and for Paul O'Grady on his 5pm Sunday teatime show. They also returned to stand in for Tarbuck in their old permanent slot on one occasion in September 2018.

== Format ==
The programme aired on Saturday evenings between 6pm and 8pm, and contained the following features, although not every segment was present in every episode.

- Wardrobe Disasters: listeners phoned in seeking fashion advice from Alan and Emma/Mel.
- Alan's Telly Quiz: two listeners competed to answer the most questions on television trivia in two minutes and won a "Going Out With Alan Carr" rosette. This segment became known for contestants often amassing very low scores.
- Carr-oake (Renamed Paddyoake whenever Patrick Kielty stood in on the show): at the end of the show, a listener dueted with Alan over the phone, and won a Going Out With Alan Carr rosette.
- Alan's Last Dance: Listeners relived the triumph – or the tragedy – of Saturday night dates.

The second hour was presented under the banner of Party Tunes, where listeners could place requests for classic party songs to be played. Throughout the programme, Carr and Forbes/Sykes would encourage listeners to phone in with mostly amusing stories about a topic on daily life, which was usually related to what was in the week's news.

== Special editions ==
On 5 September 2009, the programme was broadcast live from aboard a Blackpool tram as part of Radio 2's 'Live in Blackpool' series. Carr had turned on the famous Blackpool Illuminations the previous night, and the show also contained live music from Mika.

On Christmas Eve 2009 and again in 2010, a special show entitled 'Alan Carr's Office Party' was broadcast, containing festive music and discussions.

== Guest presenters ==
On occasions when both Carr and Forbes/Sykes were unavailable, comedian Patrick Kielty and Gaby Roslin stood in respectively, with the show renamed Going Out With Patrick and Gaby. Other famous faces to stand in on the show included former Spice Girl Melanie C, television presenters Kate Thornton and Penny Smith, talent show winner Jodie Prenger, comedian Stephen K. Amos, Christopher Biggins and Anneka Rice.

== See also ==
- Alan Carr: Chatty Man – Carr's TV chat show
