= Alan Carr's Celebrity Ding Dong =

- Genre: Game show
- Presented by: Alan Carr
- Voices of: Leslie Phillips (series 1); Peter Dickson (series 2)
- Country of origin: United Kingdom
- Original language: English
- No. of series: 2
- No. of episodes: 11 (inc. 1 special)

Production
- Running time: 45 minutes
- Production company: Open Mike Productions

Original release
- Network: Channel 4
- Release: 1 February – 23 December 2008

Alan Carr's Celebrity Ding Dong is a game show on Channel 4, presented by Alan Carr. During the first series, voice-over commentary in between rounds on the scores is provided by Leslie Phillips. From Series 2, the announcer is Peter Dickson. A Series 1 compilation was later released onto DVD in 2008.

== Format ==
The first series of Alan Carr's Celebrity Ding Dong was based around a gameshow format where two teams — "Celebrities" and "Civilians" — were asked a series of questions relating to the other team's lifestyle. Rounds included 'Celebrity Crypts', 'Life Swap', 'Kiss and Tell' and 'How the Other Half Lives'; producers claim that "fantastic prizes" can be won, much like a traditional gameshow format.

The second series abandoned the "Celebrities vs. Civilians" angle and went with two different teams of celebrities each episode.

The show also includes a celebrity news section, where Carr will irreverently discuss the week's showbiz news.

== Episodes ==
=== Series 1 ===
Date	Episode number	Celebrity team	Civilian team
	Pilot	Richard E. Grant, Les Dennis and Justin Hawkins	
1 February 2008	1	Chris Moyles, Duncan James, Zoë Ball, Tara Palmer-Tomkinson and Jamelia	Kirsty, Stacey-Jo, Stewart, John, and Laura from Glasgow
8 February 2008	2	Davina McCall, Les Dennis, Konnie Huq, Kirsty Gallacher and Alex Zane	Mel, Adele, Chris, Will and Sephra from Huddersfield
15 February 2008	3	Louis Walsh, Sarah Beeny, Richard Fleeshman, Jayne Middlemiss and Bruno Tonioli	Betty, Dennis, Berthrand, Debra and Kojak from Lewisham
22 February 2008	4	Paul O'Grady, Patrick McGuinness, Myleene Klass, Peter Andre and David Gest	Robbie, Vicki, Andy, Abbie and Peter from Liverpool
29 February 2008	5	Johnny Vegas, Jenni Falconer, Lee Ryan, Jermaine Jackson and Sara Cox	Chris, Claire, David, Hayley and Sarah from Leicester
7 March 2008	6	Lorraine Kelly, Trisha Goddard, Brendan Cole, Matt Di Angelo and Sally Lindsay	Gari, Lisa, Ross, Daithi and Shelly from Shannon

=== Series 2 ===
Series 2 started 10 October 2008. Although the series was originally commissioned for 6 episodes, only 5 episodes aired. However, at the end of the series, Alan revealed that there would be a special episode airing at Christmas time. The shows featured two teams of celebrities from similar programs or who have similar backgrounds playing against each other, such as Coronation Street vs EastEnders. Alan Carr noted in an interview with Jonathan Ross, that due to complaints from civilians they had to abandon the previous format and go along with celebrity teams.

The winning celebrity team

Date	Episode number	Ding Team	Dong Team
10 October 2008	1	Martine McCutcheon, Todd Carty, Gillian Taylforth and Joe Swash (EastEnders)	Julie Goodyear, Ian Reddington, Sally Lindsay and Bruce Jones (Coronation Street)
17 October 2008	2	Tony Blackburn, David Gest, Sophie Anderton and Christopher Biggins (I'm a Celebrity...Get Me Out of Here!)	Anton Du Beke, Claudia Winkleman, Craig Revel Horwood, and Rachel Stevens (Strictly Come Dancing)
24 October 2008	3	Gok Wan, Nicky Clarke, Jodie Kidd and Nicky Hambleton-Jones (Fashionistas)	Danny Dyer, Nick Moran, Martin Kemp and Neil Ruddock (Hard Men)
31 October 2008	4	Shaznay Lewis, Coleen Nolan, Jenny Frost and Mutya Buena (Girl bands)	Antony Costa, Kenzie, Tony Mortimer and Kian Egan (Boy bands)
7 November 2008	5	Louis Walsh, Amanda Holden, Neil Fox and John Barrowman (TV Talent Judges)	Carol Vorderman, Rav Wilding, Trisha Goddard and Kate Garraway (TV presenters)
23 December 2008	Christmas Special	Adele Silva, Paul Daniels, Debra Stephenson and Barbara Windsor (Panto Goodies)	Claire Sweeney, John Thomson, Michelle Collins and Joe Pasquale (Panto Baddies)

== Home release ==
On 20 October 2008, Universal Pictures released the entirety of the first season on DVD under the title of Alan Carr's Now That's What I Call A Ding Dong. It features all eix episodes edited as one single mini-feature, also including intercepting scenes of him interviewing Liz Hurley. Bonus features involve the unaired pilot, deleted scenes, a gag reel and a featurette.
