= The Vault (game show) =

British game show

- Genre: Game show
- Created by: Erez Tal; Ruthi Nissan; Ori Gross
- Presented by: Davina McCall (2002); Melanie Sykes (2003–04); Gabby Logan (2004)
- Theme music composer: Tomer Biran Music
- Country of origin: United Kingdom
- Original language: English
- No. of series: 3

Production
- Running time: 45 minutes (Series 1); 60 minutes (Series 2–3)
- Production companies: Carlton Television and King World

Original release
- Network: ITV
- Release: 11 May 2002 – 24 August 2004

The Vault is a British quiz show that aired on ITV for three seasons from 2002 to 2004. It was based on the original Israeli version called HaKassefet Hebrew: הַכַּסֶפֶת). First hosted by Davina McCall in 2002, it was hosted by Melanie Sykes from 2003 to 2004 and finally by Gabby Logan who stepped in for Sykes for the latter half of 2004 when Sykes went on maternity leave.

== Format ==
Seven contestants competed per episode in the first series, eight in the second, and nine in the third. Each contestant guessed a four-digit combination for the Vault, which held a cash jackpot that began at £100,000 after being won and increased by the same amount for every game it went unclaimed, up to a maximum of £1 million. The four whose guesses were furthest away became "brokers", who could offer to sell correct answers, while all others played for a chance at the jackpot.

Brokers were referred to only by their occupation. Starting with the second series, eight home viewers who had called in were chosen at random to play as brokers in addition to the four already in the studio. A new set of call-in brokers was chosen for each round, referred to by their telephone line numbers (1 through 8) and their occupation.

=== Round 1 ===
Each player individually had three minutes to answer up to 10 questions, with all other players sequestered in soundproof booths backstage. Players were spotted £1,000 to start the round, could offer multiple guesses without penalty, and could pass as often as desired.

Once a player had answered or passed on all 10 questions, they could negotiate with one broker at a time to get answers to any passed questions. Each studio broker could press a button to illuminate a light on their podium and signal their readiness to make an offer. However, the player would not know if a particular call-in broker might know an answer until/unless they called on that person. If the player and a broker agreed on a price, the broker then stated their answer; if it was correct, the price was paid to them out of the player's winnings for the round.

Each correct answer awarded £100 to the player, regardless of whether they or a broker had given it. Answering all 10 questions correctly awarded a £5,000 bonus. After all players had taken a turn, the two high scorers kept whatever money they had accumulated and advanced to Round 2. All others were eliminated from the game with no winnings.

=== Round 2 ===
The two remaining players were each spotted £1,000 to start this round. The host asked alternating questions for four minutes, starting with the high scorer from Round 1. After the host finished a question, the player in control had 15 seconds to respond, and could immediately turn to the brokers for help. If time ran out, the opponent had a further 15 seconds to answer. If both players missed the same question, the host gave the correct answer and moved on to the next one. Players could only use their spotted/accumulated money from this round to buy answers.

Questions were now worth £200 each, and the player who gave more correct answers won a £5,000 bonus. The player with the higher combined total from Rounds 1 and 2 advanced to Round 3, while the other player was eliminated with only their Round 1 winnings.

If the round ended in a tie, the host asked a maximum of three questions per player, alternating as before. Each question had to be answered within 10 seconds, and no help from the brokers was allowed. The player who gave more correct answers advanced; if they remained tied after three questions, a final toss-up was asked to break the tie.

=== Round 3 ===
In the final round, which was broadcast live, the player had two minutes to answer 10 questions, each of which added to their total winnings. They could turn to the brokers immediately, and could use any or all of their accumulated money over the course of the entire game (including this round) to purchase answers. Each question had to be answered correctly before the player could move on to the next one.

Question values were as follows:

Question #	Question value	Total Round 3 winnings
1	£250	£250
2	£250	£500
3	£250	£750
4	£250	£1,000
5	£1,000	£2,000
6	£3,000	£5,000
7	£3,000	£8,000
8	£7,000	£15,000
9	£10,000	£25,000
10	N/A	Jackpot

If the player answered the first nine questions correctly, the clock was stopped and they chose one of three categories. After the host read a question in the chosen category, the clock began to run again and the player had to answer with no help from the brokers.

If the player answered all 10 questions correctly before time ran out, the Vault opened and they won the entire jackpot in addition to their accumulated winnings from the first two rounds (reduced by payments to brokers in this round). If not, they kept only their accumulated money from all three rounds.

=== Phone game ===
If the studio player failed to win the jackpot, a call-in player was chosen at random. They were given one minute to answer six questions, two of which had been correctly answered during the game. They were allowed to use the help of any person or reference source in their vicinity, but not the brokers. No passing was allowed, and correctly answering all questions won the jackpot.

If both the studio and call-in players failed to win the jackpot, it was increased by £100,000 and rolled over to the next show, to a maximum of £1 million. A victory by either player reset the prize to £100,000.

== International versions ==
Original version
Non-broadcast pilot

Country	Name	Host	Channel	Premiere/air dates
Israel (original version)	הכספת HaKassefet	Erez Tal (2000–2004) Gabi Gazit (2006–2007)	Channel 2 (Keshet)	2000–2007
France	Le Coffre	Nagui	France 2	2004
Germany	SPEED – Time is Money	Steven Gätjen	ProSieben	2001
Greece; Cyprus	Θησαυροφυλάκιο; Thisavrofilakio	Andreas Mikroutsikos	ANT1	2001–2004
Hong Kong	群雄奪寶; Kwàhn Hùhng Dyuht Bóu	Jaclyn Chu	ATV	2002
Portugal	O Cofre	Jorge Gabriel	RTP1	2005–2006
Romania	Destept si bogat	Octavian Saiu	România 1	2002
Russia	Обратный отсчёт Obratnyj otsčót	Andrey Boltenko	TV6	2001–2002
Thailand	The Vault เจาะเซฟ	Panadda Wongpoodee	iTV	2004
Ukraine	Сейф; Seif	Sonya Gelyas	Inter	2002
United States	The Vault	-	ABC	2003
Vietnam	Vượt qua thử thách	Quang Vinh and Thu Hương (2004, 2006); Long Hoàng (2005–2007); Trần Lập (2006); Hạnh Dung (2008–2009)	HanoiTV	2004–2009
