= The Paul O'Grady Show =

British TV chat show

- The final title card (2013–2015)
- Also known as: The New Paul O'Grady Show (2006–2007)
- Genre: Entertainment
- Presented by: Paul O'Grady
- Voices of: Marc Silk; Peter Dickson
- Theme music composer: The Delta Rhythm Section (2004–2009); McFly (2013–2015)
- Opening theme: "Funkin Fever" by The Delta Rhythm Section (2004–2009) "The Paul O'Grady Show" by McFly (2013–2015)
- Ending theme: "Funkin Fever" (2004–2009) "The Paul O'Grady Show" (2013–2015)
- Country of origin: United Kingdom
- Original language: English
- No. of series: 15
- No. of episodes: 769

Production
- Executive producers: Brendan Murphy (2004); Sue Andrew (2004–06); Paul O'Grady; Robert Gray (2006–2009); David Hall (2013)
- Production locations: The London Studios (2004–2005, 2007–2009, 2013–2015); BBC Television Centre (2006–2007)
- Running time: 60 minutes (inc. adverts)
- Production companies: Granada Productions (ITV: 2004–2005); Olga TV (Channel 4: 2006–2009); ITV Studios (ITV: 2013–2015)

Original release
- Network: ITV
- Release: 11 October 2004 – 23 December 2005
- Network: Channel 4
- Release: 27 March 2006 – 18 December 2009
- Network: ITV
- Release: 11 November 2013 – 29 May 2015

Related
- The 5 O'Clock Show; Paul O'Grady Live

The Paul O'Grady Show was a British comedy chat show that was titularly-presented by comedian Paul O'Grady. The programme was a teatime chat show consisting of a mixture of celebrity guests, comic stunts, musical performances, and occasionally viewer competitions.

The format was originally devised by Granada Productions (now known as ITV Studios) and was broadcast on ITV until December 2005, before moving to Channel 4 in 2006, where the show was produced by Olga TV. The show originally ended in 2009 when O'Grady announced a move back to ITV, adapting his format to prime-time for Friday nights at 9pm, hosting Paul O'Grady Live from 2010. However the show underperformed in the ratings, averaging just over 3 million viewers, and ended after two series in 2011 amongst reports O'Grady was "keen to move on".

Three years later, the original teatime format returned to ITV on 11 November 2013, airing at its traditional time of weekdays at 5pm. It concluded its twelfth run on 13 December 2013. It returned for a thirteenth series on 28 April 2014, which ended on 30 May 2014. The programme has averaged 2 million viewers in its 5pm slot. A third and final revived series began airing on 20 April 2015 on ITV and ended on 29 May 2015. O'Grady's Cairn Terrier cross, Olga, who frequently appeared alongside him on The Paul O'Grady Show, died in April 2018. Five years later, on 28 March 2023, O'Grady died at the age of 67.

== Format ==
The show ran weekdays, Monday to Friday, for one hour from 5:00 pm. Each episode follows O'Grady being introduced, walking to his desk with one of his pet dogs; originally Buster, a Shih Tzu and Bichon Frise cross, until his death shortly before the show originally ended in 2009, and Olga, a Cairn Terrier who regularly appeared after the series returned in 2013. O'Grady read out viewers' letters, sometimes with disgust at the things viewers have sent (which included vibrating soap, a viewer's dead goldfish wrapped in tissue and children's letters asking if Paul wears a wig or dentures).

The remainder of the programme consists of interviews with two or more celebrity guests. Children were also featured in segments of the show such as reviewing toys, games and films, or demonstrating skills (such as speed cup stacking). The show was broadcast live from The London Studios.

== History ==
=== 2004–2005: ITV ===
ITV previously had trouble filling the 5-6pm slot with a popular programme, with two daytime soap operas failing to achieve significant ratings in the slot. Night and Day launched in 2001 but moved from its teatime slot in 2002 after falling ratings. Similarly the revived version of Crossroads occupied the slot from March 2001, however it too saw a decline in ratings particularly after major cast and production changes towards the end and was axed in mid-2003. Furthermore, daytime versions of popular gameshows Catchphrase and Family Fortunes had also been tried out within teatime during 2002 but had also failed to succeed, leading to their subsequent original cancellations. The Paul O'Grady Show was seen as the saviour of this teatime slot.

ITV commissioned The Paul O'Grady Show in October 2004 following O'Grady's appearance as a guest presenter for the (somewhat similar formatted) lunch-time entertainment show Today with Des and Mel. ITV management were so impressed by his initial standing in – a replacement for regular host Des O'Connor – that he was brought back several more times, and subsequently O'Grady was given his own show (O'Grady also became good friends with co-presenter Melanie Sykes, who went on to stand in for him on O'Grady's own show on occasion).

Guess the Tune (which became well known as The Organ Game on the Channel 4 version, and the second on ITV), a phone-in-competition where O'Grady plays tunes on his organ and the contestant has to guess them correctly to win up to £2,000, became a popular feature of the programme. The tune that O'Grady played leading into the game was a truncated version of "Sing As We Go", by Gracie Fields. Also a stalwart of the show was O'Grady's Shih Tzu/Bichon Frise cross dog, Buster, who appeared for a full five minutes at the start of each programme since the ITV incarnation of the show.

=== 2006–2009: Channel 4 ===
On 10 January 2006, in an unexpected announcement, O'Grady said that he had decided to leave ITV for Channel 4, following a dispute between O'Grady and Granada Productions (who made The Paul O'Grady Show for ITV) after Granada 'forgot' to renew O'Grady's ITV contract. O'Grady was believed to have left ITV not only due to his contract renewal issues nor his salary, but rather he wanted more creative control over the show (Granada had promptly refused when the show was under their production). His own television production company, Olga TV (named after one of his pet dogs), subsequently took over production of the programme.

The programme began its run on Channel 4 in March 2006, in the same 5:00–6:00 pm early evening slot, alternating in this slot every three months or so with Richard & Judy. In response, initially ITV decided to air repeats of the original show in the same slot. This was partially the reason why, for its first few series on the new channel, Channel 4 billed the programme as The New Paul O'Grady Show.

During its time on both ITV from 2004 to 2005 and Channel 4, The Paul O'Grady Show was broadcast live on Mondays, Tuesdays, and Wednesdays, but Thursday's and Friday's episode were pre-recorded on the Tuesday and Wednesday of that week, respectively, at 12:30 pm.

=== 2013–2015: ITV revival ===
After four years off-air, the show returned on 11 November 2013, in the same teatime slot from 5–6pm, on its original channel ITV, with a new theme tune written and performed by McFly. Games including Guess the Tune, also known as "The Organ Game", also returned. O'Grady announced that the show would return for another series, beginning on 28 April 2014. A third and final revived series began airing on 20 April 2015.

Similarly to the Channel 4 show, The Paul O'Grady Show was broadcast live on Mondays, Tuesdays, and Wednesdays at 5:00pm; Thursday's and Friday's episode were pre-recorded on the Tuesday and Wednesday of that week, respectively, at 12:30pm.

== Series overview ==
=== ITV (2004–2005) ===
The series began broadcasting on ITV on 11 October 2004. The show ran several different features, including a competition to decide the country's best meat and potato pie, with the efforts of the Denby Dale Pie Company voted as the winner. Series two aired from 14 March to 27 May 2005 and the final original ITV series ended on 23 December that same year. Repeats of the original ITV series were shown for some time in direct competition with new episodes on Channel 4 after O'Grady left ITV.

=== Channel 4 (2006–2009) ===
The first Channel 4 series of The New Paul O'Grady Show began airing on 27 March 2006 and ran until 16 June 2006 (repeats of the show were broadcast on More4 the following lunchtime). The new show was recorded at the BBC Television Centre instead of the original home, The London Studios, due to an apparent dispute with ITV. The second series was planned to start on 4 September 2006, but was pushed back to 25 September due to O'Grady suffering a second heart attack. The second series ran until 26 January 2007.

Buster did not appear for the first two weeks due to a serious eye infection, so O'Grady's other pet dog Olga took his place instead. On 16 January 2007, viewers noticed that instead of the scheduled live show, a repeat show was aired instead. This was due to O'Grady pulling out of the show at the last minute due to illness, later discovered as a sickness bug. O'Grady returned live the next day.

The third series on Channel 4 aired from 2 April to 15 June 2007. The show returned for the seventh series (the fourth on Channel 4) on 17 September 2007, running until December of that year. The New from the show title was dropped from this series and the show went back to its original ITV title. The show's opening titles were retinted red, and subsequently the set backdrop was made red. The programme returned to The London Studios from BBC Television Centre.

Following news of premium rate phone in scandals, The Organ Game was suspended (as it relied on people calling in to enter the game). On the first episode of the new series (broadcast on 17 September 2007), Paul went over to play The Organ Game near the end of the show to find it tied up and him unable to use it. He invited viewers to telephone or e-mail Channel 4 bosses to allow him to play the phone-in game. On 22 October 2007, O'Grady announced on his show that The Organ Game would be returning; however there were only four special organ games leading up to Christmas, primarily for people who deserve the cash prize being offered (the phone line entries which used to be on the show have remained suspended). On 19 November 2007, the first of the four special Organ Games aired.

The fifth series on Channel 4 began on 17 March 2008. The new series ran throughout the spring until 16 June, at which point Richard & Judy returned for its last series. The studio set was given a slight revamp with added studio lights on the floor and walls.

On 15 April 2008, Melanie Sykes hosted the show, although it was not announced that she would be hosting. Sykes informed the audience that O'Grady was ill with the flu, and as such was unable to present. Sykes hosted that week's shows before O'Grady returned on 21 April. However, O'Grady had not fully recovered, and Sykes had to be called in to do the following show on Tuesday. It was announced that Lorraine Kelly would host Wednesday's show, Brian Conley would host Thursday's show, and Shane Richie would host Friday's show. O'Grady finally returned on 28 April.

The show returned on 22 September 2008 for a new series which ended on 19 December. Brand new titles were introduced as well as a slight revamp to the set. Series 7 of the Channel 4 show began on Channel 4 on 23 February 2009 and concluded its run on 22 May. Series 8 of the Channel 4 show began on 21 September 2009. The series concluded on 18 December and was the last to air on Channel 4. During this series, it was announced that the popular pet, Buster, had retired, and on 23 November it was announced that Buster had died aged fourteen on 19 November 2009. A spokesman for the comedian confirmed the news by telling The Daily Mirror that O'Grady was "absolutely gutted".

On 18 December 2009, O'Grady presented his final show with an array of special guests; including Beverley Callard and William Roache, Honor Blackman, Natalie Cassidy, JLS, Scott Maslen, Joe McFadden, Linda Thorson, Melanie Sykes, Catherine Tate (appearing as Joannie "Nan" Taylor), Kate Thornton and The Teletubbies. Plus, other celebrities including Kim Cattrall, Whoopi Goldberg, Jonas Brothers, Alan Menken and Enrique Iglesias.

O'Grady's daughter, her partner and his grandchildren made a good luck VT to say goodbye to O'Grady. The VT included highlights from O'Grady's own segments along with the viewers favorite moment of the show. One of the most notable reviews came from Braylan Ramirez, he described the show as “sometimes it can suck but sometimes you gotta love it”

=== ITV revival (2013–2015) ===
The twelfth series (fourth on ITV) began airing on 11 November 2013 on ITV. It featured a new theme tune by McFly and a new, but similar set with features from previous series. A thirteenth series (fifth on ITV) was broadcast from 28 April until 30 May 2014. A third and final revived series on ITV began airing on 20 April 2015.

== Guest hosts ==
While recovering from his second heart attack, Channel 4 insisted O'Grady should take a week off from presenting the show. This break occurred from 23 to 27 October 2006 and guest presenters hosted the programme for a day each. Since then, there have been three more scheduled guest-hosted weeks and in total there have been 27 different celebrity guest hosts.

In April 2008, there were two unscheduled guest-hosted weeks. O'Grady hosted the Monday show during these two weeks, but was taken ill after contracting a flu virus for the remainder of the weeks. Melanie Sykes guest-hosted five of the eight remaining shows, having previously hosted the show three times. In total she has been guest host 11 times.

On 15 October 2009, O'Grady had to go to the dentist for some dental work, with Joe Pasquale substituting for him as host.

On 18 November 2013, O'Grady was taken ill with a suspected angina attack meaning he was unable to present the live show from that day. He was replaced by singer and entertainer Michael Ball for that episode and presenter and magician Stephen Mulhern the following day. Emma Willis hosted on 20 November, followed by Vernon Kay the next day, and finally comedian Jo Brand guest hosted on 22 November. On 25 November 2013, O'Grady returned and thanked the five stand-ins for filling in for him over the previous week. He paid particular thanks to Michael Ball who found out he was to host with only 40 minutes' notice.

=== 2006 ===
Episode	Date	Host
1	23 October 2006	Vernon Kay
2	24 October 2006	Cilla Black
3	25 October 2006	Lorraine Kelly
4	26 October 2006	Jesse Metcalfe
5	27 October 2006	Alan Titchmarsh
6	27 November 2006	Judith Chalmers
7	28 November 2006	Melanie Sykes
8	29 November 2006	Paddy McGuinness
9	30 November 2006	Lorraine Kelly
10	1 December 2006	Brian Conley

=== 2007 ===
Episode	Date	Host
1	7 May 2007	Justin Lee Collins
2	8 May 2007	Melanie Sykes
3	9 May 2007	Vernon Kay
4	10 May 2007	Liza Tarbuck
5	11 May 2007	Lenny Henry
6	5 November 2007	Melanie Sykes
7	6 November 2007	Chris Moyles
8	7 November 2007	Lorraine Kelly
9	8 November 2007	Michael Bublé
10	9 November 2007	Ross Kemp

=== 2008 ===
Episode	Date	Host(s)
1	15 April 2008	Melanie Sykes
2	16 April 2008	Melanie Sykes
3	17 April 2008	Melanie Sykes
4	18 April 2008	Melanie Sykes
5	22 April 2008	Melanie Sykes
6	23 April 2008	Melanie Sykes
7	24 April 2008	Brian Conley
8	25 April 2008	Shane Richie
9	3 November 2008	Melanie Sykes and Des O'Connor
10	4 November 2008	Melanie Brown
11	5 November 2008	Joe Pasquale
12	6 November 2008	Ross Kemp
13	7 November 2008	Jackie Collins

Note: For the episode hosted by Jackie Collins, O'Grady himself was the guest along with Paris Hilton.

=== 2009 ===
Episode	Date	Host
1	6 April 2009	Dermot O'Leary
2	7 April 2009	Dawn French
3	8 April 2009	Melanie Sykes
4	9 April 2009	Joanna Page
5	10 April 2009	Joe Pasquale
6	13 April 2009	Alan Carr
7	15 October 2009	Joe Pasquale
8	2 November 2009	Fern Britton
9	3 November 2009	Peter Andre
10	4 November 2009	Michael Bublé
11	5 November 2009	Jo Brand
12	6 November 2009	Johnny Vegas

=== 2013 ===
Episode	Date	Host
1	18 November 2013	Michael Ball
2	19 November 2013	Stephen Mulhern
3	20 November 2013	Emma Willis
4	21 November 2013	Vernon Kay
5	22 November 2013	Jo Brand

== The Paul O'Grady Players annual pantomime ==
Every year, the show had an annual Christmas pantomime. Roughly 15 guest stars appeared in the panto. There was always one narrator, who told the story throughout the panto. This had been Antony Cotton, Dawn French, Kate Thornton, Sandi Toksvig and Stephen Fry. The panto ran roughly for the whole show, with usually five minutes left at the end when O'Grady and the stars answered the questions that had been e-mailed in by the viewers. However, in the 2006 panto, Peter Pan, the panto only ran for roughly 40 minutes, ending around 5.40 pm. After this, O'Grady interviewed Dawn French, who was the narrator, as he would do on a normal show. There was then, as usual, the organ game and O'Grady and all the stars then answered e-mails sent in by the viewers. The panto was always on the last Wednesday before Christmas, meaning that it was always broadcast live.

The pantos were:

- 2005: The Wizard of Oz
- 2006: Peter Pan
- 2007: Cinderella
- 2008: Pinocchio
- 2009: Sleeping Beauty (broadcast on 14 December instead of 16 December)

Jo Brand was the only celebrity who appeared in the panto every year. O'Grady thanked Brand for her appearance in every annual panto on the show after the fifth and final panto on 14 December 2009.

The pantomime did not return in the 2013 revival.

== Guest appearances ==
The Paul O'Grady Show appeared in a series 3 episode of The Catherine Tate Show, where Tate's character Joannie "Nan" Taylor made an appearance. Originally she acted very sweet, but later revealed her true colours. When O'Grady mentioned that they had replaced Joannie's old chair with a new one and placed it in her flat, she became enraged at them for intruding her flat. Nan started swearing and walked off the set, much to the disgust of O'Grady.

The show made a brief appearance in the Doctor Who episode "The Stolen Earth".

== Transmissions ==
Series	Start date	End date	Episodes	Channel
1	11 October 2004	3 December 2004	40	ITV
2	14 March 2005	27 May 2005	55	ITV
3	12 September 2005	23 December 2005	75	ITV
4	27 March 2006	16 June 2006	60	Channel 4
5	25 September 2006	26 January 2007	79	Channel 4
6	2 April 2007	15 June 2007	55	Channel 4
7	17 September 2007	21 December 2007	70	Channel 4
8	17 March 2008	13 June 2008	60	Channel 4
9	22 September 2008	19 December 2008	65	Channel 4
10	23 February 2009	22 May 2009	65	Channel 4
11	21 September 2009	18 December 2009	65	Channel 4
12	11 November 2013	13 December 2013	25	ITV
13	28 April 2014	30 May 2014	25	ITV
14	20 April 2015	29 May 2015	30	ITV

== Controversies ==
- In light of O'Grady's love of dogs, and the fact that O'Grady rescued Buster, the show ran a "Find a Dog a Home" slot where abandoned dogs from various charities were featured. Viewers could then call in to request they be placed on a list to give the dog a permanent home. A direct telephone number was given to connect viewers to the appropriate charity. On moving to Channel 4, the slot remained but now viewers had to initially call a 10p-per-call information service to get the direct number of the charity. Calls dropped dramatically, and charity groups including Dogs Trust and Battersea Dogs and Cats Home told producers that they would no longer be involved with the show. The premium rate line was quickly dropped from 29 May 2006, and the original format reintroduced with the full support of the charities.

== See also ==
- Paul O'Grady Live
