= Emma Forbes =

English radio and television presenter

- Born: Emma Katy Forbes; 14 May 1965 (age 61); Hammersmith, London, England
- Education: Italia Conti Academy of Theatre Arts
- Occupations: Radio and television presenter
- Years active: 1971–present
- Spouse: Graham Clempson (m. 1987)
- Parents: Bryan Forbes (father); Nanette Newman (mother)

Emma Katy Forbes (born 14 May 1965 in Hammersmith, London) is an English radio and television presenter. Forbes got her start on presenting the cooking segment on Going Live!, and before going on to present or co-present numerous BBC and ITV TV and breakfast shows, as well as to co-present radio shows on Heart 106.2 and Capital 95.8 and BBC Radio 2. Forbes was also the face of a long-running television advert campaign for Head & Shoulders shampoo in the 1990s and, in 1996, she was voted one of FHM 100 Sexiest Women. Together with her sister, she also opened a shop in Belgravia, London.

== Early life ==
Forbes's parents are Nanette Newman and Bryan Forbes. She attended Hurst Lodge School.

== Career ==
Forbes presented the cooking slot on Going Live!, a position she won after bombarding the production office with ideas for 'makes'. She was then selected as co-presenter for the replacement BBC children's show Live & Kicking with Andi Peters from 1993 through to 1996 and also presented ITV's teenage problem show Speakeasy.

From 1994 to 1996, Forbes hosted a Meridian Television revival of the panel show What's My Line?. (Her mother had been a regular panellist on the 1970s BBC version of the show.) She has voiced Mummy Hippo in the children's animated series, Peppa Pig. She also presented the Heart 106.2 breakfast show, alongside Jonathan Coleman, before she left to present on Capital 95.8.

Forbes was the face of a long-running television advert campaign for Head & Shoulders shampoo in the mid-to-late 1990s. In 1996, she was voted number 64 in the FHM 100 Sexiest Women Poll, and has been represented by Storm Models.

Alongside Mark Radcliffe, Forbes has co-hosted the Steve Wright show on BBC Radio 2. Also on BBC Radio 2 Forbes presented a Saturday show from 6 pm to 8 pm alongside comedian Alan Carr called Going Out with Alan Carr, and a Sunday morning breakfast show, replacing Pete Mitchell. On 13 December 2009, she announced that she would no longer be presenting her Sunday show on BBC Radio 2, but she continued to co-present Going Out With Alan Carr on Saturday evenings until April 2010. From March 2011, Forbes was a regular discussion contributor on ITV's daytime show The Alan Titchmarsh Show, which ended in November 2014.

== Personal life ==
Forbes lives with her husband Graham Clempson and they have two children, born in 1996 and 1999. She suffered from postnatal depression after both births.

When she took a professional break to have her two children, Forbes and her journalist sister Sarah Standing started a shop in Belgravia, London. Forbes is a party organiser. Forbes is also a patron of Great Ormond Street Hospital. She is also a long-time fan of Bolton Wanderers Football Club.
