= Olga TV =

British television production company

- Industry: Media
- Founded: 2005
- Founder: Paul O'Grady
- Headquarters: London, United Kingdom
- Key people: Paul O'Grady (Founder, deceased 2023)
- Products: Television

Olga TV is a British independent television production company set up by the late entertainer and talk show host, Paul O'Grady in 2005.

== History ==
Named after O'Grady's pet dog, Olga the company is best known for producing shows such as The Paul O'Grady Show for Channel 4. The Paul O'Grady Show ended on Channel 4 on 18 December 2009, as O'Grady had signed a new deal with ITV.

Between 2010 and 2011, Olga TV produced Friday night ITV chatshow Paul O'Grady Live, however on 7 October 2011, it was announced that the show had been cancelled.

O'Grady's show For the Love of Dogs was produced by Multistory Media (formerly Shiver).

On 4 May 2013, ITV confirmed that The Paul O'Grady Show would return in November 2013 with an initial 25 episode run and that it will be produced by O'Grady's production company Olga TV.

On 28 March 2023, O’Grady died aged 67.

A tribute to Lily Savage, The Life and Death of Lily Savage, which is co-produced by Olga TV and Silver Star Productions, was aired in March 2024 on ITV.

The last episode of Paul O'Grady's Great Elephant Adventure, which was filmed at the end of 2022, aired posthumously in April 2024. This was produced by Olga TV in conjunction with Silver Star Productions.

== Productions ==
Year	Title	Channel
2006–09, 2013–15	The Paul O'Grady Show	Channel 4 (2006–09); ITV (2013–15)
2010	The 5 O'Clock Show	Channel 4
2010–11	Paul O'Grady Live	ITV
2012–2023	Paul O'Grady: For the Love of Dogs^{1}	ITV
2013	Perspectives: Gypsy Rose Lee - The Queen of Burlesque	ITV
2015	TFI Friday	Channel 4
2016	Paul O'Grady: The Sally Army & Me^{2}	BBC One
2016	Paul O'Grady's Favourite Fairy Tales^{3}	ITV
2017	Paul O'Grady: For the Love of Animals – India^{3}	ITV
2018	Paul O'Grady's Little Heroes	ITV
2024	Paul O'Grady's Great Elephant Adventure^{4}	ITV
2024	The Life and Death of Lily Savage^{4}	ITV

- ^{1} Later known as For the Love of Dogs with Alison Hammond in 2024
- ^{2} This was a joint production with Potato
- ^{3} These were joint productions with Shiver Productions
- ^{4} These were joint productions with Silver Star Productions
