= Graham Skidmore =

British voice artist and announcer (1931–2021)

- Born: Graham George Skidmore; 22 September 1931; West Bromwich, Staffordshire, England
- Died: 27 December 2021 (aged 90); Margate, Kent, England
- Occupation: Announcer
- Years active: 1959–2010
- Television: Blind Date; Shooting Stars
- Spouse: Pauline Mickleburgh (m. 1966)
- Children: 3

Graham George Skidmore (22 September 1931 – 27 December 2021) was a British voice artist and game show announcer, best known for providing the voice-over for the television dating gameshow Blind Date on ITV from 1985 until 2002, in which host Cilla Black referred to him as "Our Graham". He was also known for the BBC comedy panel game Shooting Stars.

== Early life ==
Skidmore was born in West Bromwich in 1931. He grew up in London and carried out his National Service in the Royal Army Medical Corps. Skidmore wanted to be a physician, but he missed his final exams due to an ear infection. He was also due to fight in the Korean War, but he missed this for the same reason.

== Career ==
In 1959, after taking singing lessons, Skidmore successfully auditioned for the musical Marigold at the Savoy Theatre in London. He could be seen in a background role in the 1960 film The Pure Hell of St Trinian's, and also played a minor role in the 1961 film The Day the Earth Caught Fire.

Skidmore was best known for being the voiceover on London Weekend Television's dating gameshow Blind Date from 1985 to 2002. Host Cilla Black referred to him as "our Graham". In 2002, after viewing figures declined, Skidmore was sacked by letter from the show, being replaced by Tommy Sandhu.

Skidmore also had a similar role as a voiceover artist on the BBC comedy panel game Shooting Stars with Vic Reeves and Bob Mortimer, from 1993 to 2002, in which he introduced the show's contestants.

He was a background character in the 1999 film Eyes Wide Shut, and appeared in person on The Justin Lee Collins Show in 2009. Skidmore found work as a photographic model, and appeared on advertising posters and in television commercials, both in person and as a voiceover.

== Personal life and death ==
Skidmore married Pauline Mickleburgh in 1966. The couple had three children: a son and two daughters.

He attended the funeral of Blind Date host Cilla Black in 2015. Skidmore suffered from vascular malignancy and vascular dementia, which also affected his speech, during the last decade of his life, and spent his final years living in Kent.

He died on 27 December 2021, aged 90, in Margate, Kent, but his death was not made widely known until it was reported by the entertainment union Equity in June 2022.
