= Alan Carr =

English comedian, TV personality (born 1976)

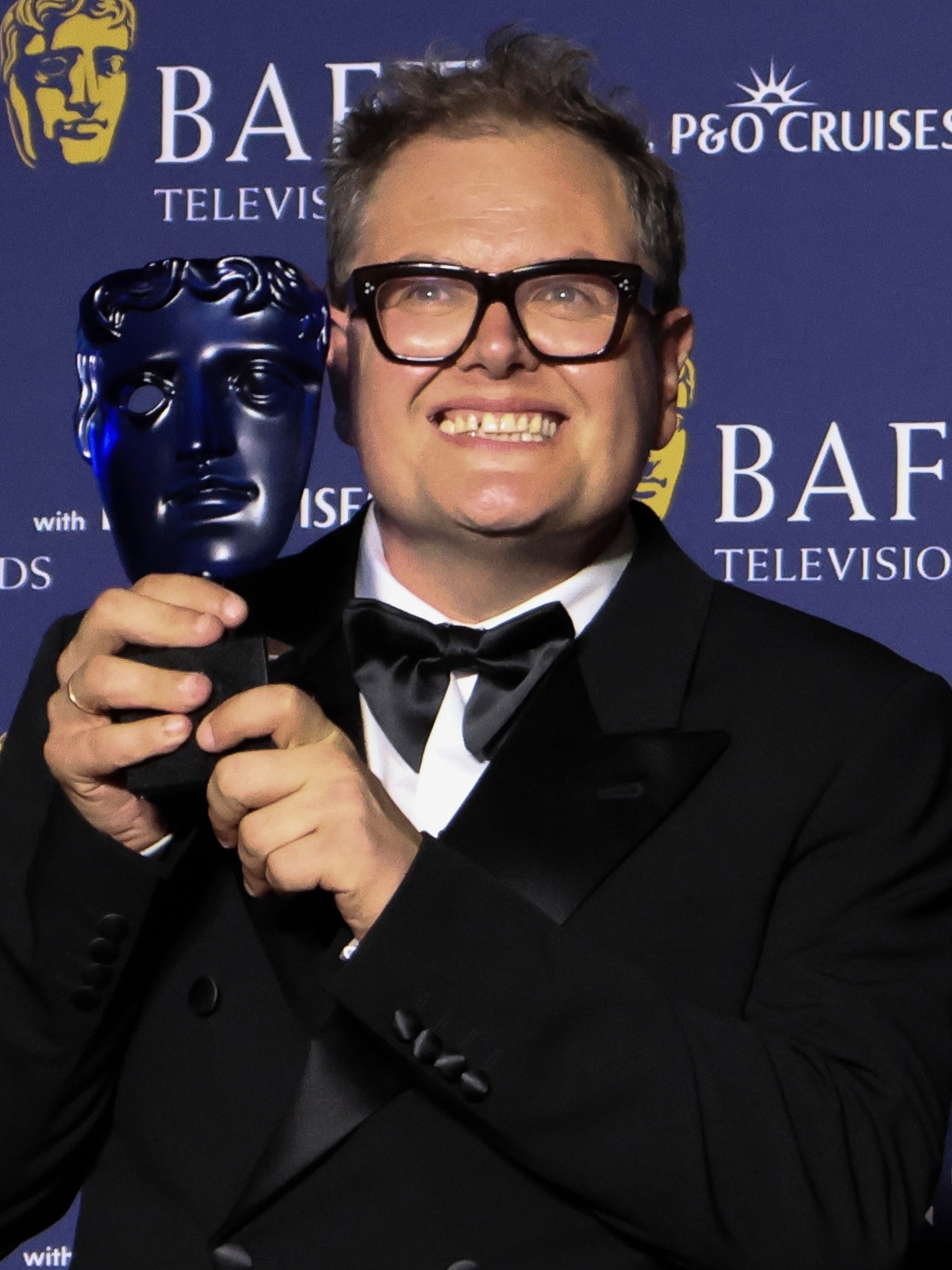
- Carr at the 2026 BAFTAs
- Born: Alan Graham Carr; 14 June 1976 (age 50); Weymouth, Dorset, England
- Education: Middlesex University
- Spouse: Paul Drayton (m. 2018; sep. 2022)
- Father: Graham Carr
- Relatives: Jonathan Ross (distant cousin)

Comedy career
- Years active: 2005–present
- Medium: Radio; stand-up; television
- Genre: Observational comedy
- Subjects: Everyday life; innuendo
- Website: Official website

Alan Graham Carr (born 14 June 1976) is an English comedian, broadcaster, writer, and television personality. His breakthrough was in 2001, winning the City Life Best Newcomer of the Year and the BBC New Comedy Awards. In the ensuing years, Carr's career burgeoned on the Manchester comedy circuit before he became known for co-hosting the comedy variety show The Friday Night Project (2006–2009) with Justin Lee Collins. This led to the release of a short-lived entertainment show Alan Carr's Celebrity Ding Dong (2008), and he went on to host the award-winning comedy chat show Alan Carr: Chatty Man (2009–2017).

Carr's other television work includes being a team captain on the comedy panel show 8 Out of 10 Cats Does Countdown (2017–2018), judging the reality competition series RuPaul's Drag Race UK (2019–present), starring in the sitcom Changing Ends (2023–present), and winning the first series of the reality show The Celebrity Traitors (2025). From 2009 to 2012, he hosted the radio show Going Out with Alan Carr on BBC Radio 2. He recently co-starred, alongside Amanda Holden, in ‘Amanda & Alan’s Italian Job’, ‘Amanda & Alan’s Spanish Job’ and ‘Amanda & Alan’s Greek Job’.

Carr has written and performed five stand-up comedy tours: Tooth Fairy Live (2007), Spexy Beast Live (2011), Yap, Yap, Yap! (2015), Not Again, Alan! (2020–2021), and Regional Trinket (2021–2023). In 2008, he released his autobiographical book Look Who It Is!. Carr has won three British Comedy Awards, three National Television Awards, and two BAFTA TV Awards.

== Early life and education ==
Alan Graham Carr was born on 14 June 1976, in Weymouth, Dorset, elder son of Christine and Graham Carr, and spent the majority of his childhood in Northampton. His father, Graham, whose family comes from the North East of England, is a former Northampton Town manager and Newcastle United chief scout. Carr has a younger brother, Gary.

Carr went to Weston Favell Upper School in Northampton and graduated from Middlesex University with a 2:1 BA (Hons) degree in Drama and Theatre Studies.

After completing his degree in his early 20s, Carr moved to Manchester, aspiring to be a comedian. He lived in Chorlton-cum-Hardy after which he moved to Stretford, which he cites as an inspiration for his comedic work. Carr worked in a call centre for five years and performed on the comedy circuit in his spare time, before moving into comedy as a full-time career.

== Career ==
=== Television and film ===
Carr's early TV career included guest appearances on 8 Out of 10 Cats in 2005 and The Law of the Playground in 2006. He and Justin Lee Collins co-hosted The Friday Night Project from series two in 2006 until it was cancelled after the end of series eight in February 2009. Carr went on to host two series of Channel 4's game show Alan Carr's Celebrity Ding Dong from 2007 to 2009, and the chat show Alan Carr: Chatty Man, which ran for 16 series from 2009-2016, with Christmas Specials in 2016 and 2017.

Carr was a Traitor on the first series of The Celebrity Traitors, which aired in October and November 2025. He won the series, with his prize money of £87,500 being donated to Neuroblastoma UK, a charity he personally chose focusing on childhood cancer. In August 2025, Carr was announced as one of the contestants on the second series of LOL: Last One Laughing UK, which premiered in 2026 on Amazon Prime Video.

=== Radio ===
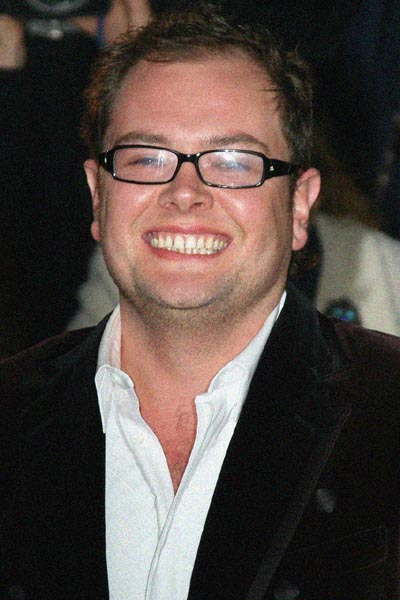
Carr in 2007

Carr made his radio presenting debut on Christmas Day 2007 for BBC Radio 2 as part of their Festive Highlights with the show Alan Carr's Christmas Box. He filled in on BBC Radio 6 Music on 16 February and 14 June 2008, for Adam and Joe and co-presented The Russell Brand Show on 4 October 2008. He also presented Alan Carr's Comedy Outings for BBC Radio 2 in 2008.

On 25 April 2009, Carr began hosting Going Out with Alan Carr, a new show for BBC Radio 2, in conjunction with Emma Forbes (later replaced by Melanie Sykes). The show was broadcast every Saturday evening from 6 pm to 8 pm. On 6 March 2012, it was reported that he had made the decision to leave to focus on his Chatty Man show. His last show was on 31 March 2012. Carr was replaced by Liza Tarbuck. He returned on Boxing Day 2015 for a one-off show on the station.

For four weeks in January/February 2017, Carr again returned to BBC Radio 2 to sit in for Paul O'Grady on his Sunday show. Carr reunited with Sykes to present a 10-week show called Summer Escapes sitting in for Graham Norton on Saturdays from July to September on BBC Radio 2 yearly from 2017 until its final run in 2020 following Norton's departure from the station. It included features based around summer including the British Seaside Survey.

=== Stand-up ===
Carr performs stand-up regularly, on tour and on television. He became a regular performer on the Manchester comedy circuit in his 20s, where he met fellow comedians Jason Manford, Justin Moorhouse and John Bishop, and had his own monthly comedy and cabaret show Alan Carr's Ice Cream Sunday at the Manchester Comedy Store.

In 2001, Carr won the City Life Best Newcomer of the Year and the BBC New Comedy Awards.

Carr has been featured in three Edinburgh shows and in 2007 he toured throughout the UK, which was followed by a DVD entitled Tooth Fairy Live. He has performed at the Apollo Theatre in London, which was televised for the BBC One series Live at the Apollo, and has been featured in the Royal Variety Performance.

Carr has appeared and performed at many festivals, including the Reading and Leeds Festivals, Latitude Festival in Suffolk and Kilkenny Comedy Festival in Ireland. He has performed stand-up internationally, including an appearance at the Just for Laughs festival in Montreal.

In March 2010, Carr took part in Channel 4's Comedy Gala, a benefit show held at the O2 Arena in aid of Great Ormond Street Children's Hospital in London.

=== Autobiography ===
Look Who It Is! is Carr's autobiography published in 2008. It details his life from growing up in Weymouth to presenting The Friday Night Project. In the book, Carr recounts how he grew up in the shadow of his father Graham, and was therefore expected to grow up to be a great football player, despite his childhood "puppy fat". The book laments on his schooldays. During that time in his life, Carr was picked last for the football team when the other students found out his lack of talent and his father forced him to refuse to communicate with a friend because he was apparently "gaying him up". Carr also tells the story of how puberty left him with "big teeth" and a camp voice.

== Personal life ==
Carr is gay, but does not consider his sexuality to be a focal part of his act; in 2008, he said: "I just think gay people need to get over themselves. Just because you're gay and on the telly doesn't mean you're a role model. I'm just a comedian. That's all I am. I don't talk about being gay and I think what better equality for gays than that?"

According to Carr, he has been aware of his sexuality from a very young age. When Eddie Izzard was a guest on Chatty Man and asked Carr when he came out of the closet, he replied that he was "never really in" and other children were already making fun of his camp behaviour when he was eight or nine years old.

In January 2018, Carr married his partner of ten years, Paul Drayton, in Los Angeles. The wedding was officiated by his best friend Adele. The couple announced their separation in January 2022 following Drayton's conviction for drunk-driving. He was previously the owner of two pigs, but lost them in the divorce.

Carr lives in West Sussex.

In February 2026, Carr announced that he had bought Ayton Castle.

== Stand-up tours ==
Year	Title	Notes
2006–07	Tooth Fairy	
2011	Spexy Beast	
2014–15	Yap, Yap, Yap	
2020–21	Not Again, Alan!	
2021–23	Regional Trinket	
2027	Have I Said Too Much?	

=== DVD releases ===
Title	Released	Notes
Tooth Fairy Live	12 November 2007	Live at London's Hammersmith Apollo
Spexy Beast Live	14 November 2011	Live at Manchester's Arena
Yap, Yap, Yap! Live	16 November 2015	Live at London's Hammersmith Apollo

== Filmography ==
=== Television ===
Year	Title	Role	Notes
2005–2006	8 Out of 10 Cats	Panelist	7 episodes
2006	The Law of the Playground	Himself	Documentary comedy: 7 episodes (series 1)
2006–2009	Friday/Sunday Night Project	Presenter	
2007–2008	Alan Carr's Celebrity Ding Dong	Presenter	Two series; 12 episodes
2007, 2018	Live at the Apollo	Presenter	3 episodes
2008	The Comedy Map of Britain	Himself	
2009–2017	Alan Carr: Chatty Man	Presenter	181 episodes (series 1–16; two Christmas specials)
2009–2020	The One Show	Guest Presenter	10 episodes
2010	The New Paul O'Grady Show	Guest Presenter	2 episodes
2010–2016	Channel 4's Comedy Gala	Presenter	
2011	Who Do You Think You Are?	Himself	Episode: "Alan Carr"
2011	My Favourite Joke	Himself	One series
2011–2017	Alan Carr's Specstacular	Presenter	
2012	Playing It Straight UK	Narrator	
2012	Comedy World Cup	Contestant	Team Captain, 2 episodes
2012–present	Stand Up to Cancer	Co-Presenter	
2014	Stars at Your Service	Co-Presenter	
2014	The Singer Takes It All	Presenter	
2014	Celebrity Deal or No Deal	Contestant	Won £41,000 for Stand Up to Cancer
2016	Alan Carr's 12 Stars of Christmas	Presenter	Channel 4 game show
2016	Alan Carr's Happy Hour	Presenter	3 episodes (series 1)
2016	National Treasure	Himself	1 episode
2016, 2018	Peter Kay's Comedy Shuffle	Himself	2 episodes
2017	The Price is Right	Himself	
2017–2018	8 Out of 10 Cats Does Countdown	Team Captain	12 episodes
2018	The Remote Controller	Presenter	Non-broadcast pilot for Channel 4
2018	I Don't Like Mondays	Presenter	Channel 4 game show
2018	The Great Celebrity Bake Off	Himself	TV special; 1 episode
2018	Hollyoaks	Himself	1 episode
2018	Alan Carr's Christmas Cracker	Presenter	TV special
2019	Alan Carr's Celebrity Re-Play 2019	Presenter	TV special
2019–2021	There's Something About Movies	Presenter	Sky One panel show
2019–present	RuPaul's Drag Race UK	Judge	
2020	Meet the Richardsons	Himself	1 episode
2020	Secrets of the Driving Test	Narrator	6 episodes
2020	Michael McIntyre's The Wheel	Contestant	Christmas Special
2020–2022	Alan Carr's Epic Gameshow	Presenter	ITV game show
2021	DNA Journey	Himself	TV documentary
2021	The Masked Singer UK	Guest Panellist	Episode 6; Quarter Final (Series 2)
2021	Royal Variety Performance	Host	
2021–present	Interior Design Masters with Alan Carr	Presenter	
2022	Alan Carr's Adventures With Agatha Christie	Presenter	3 episodes
2022–present	RuPaul's Drag Race: UK vs. the World	Judge	
2023	Mamma Mia! I Have a Dream	Judge	Talent show
2023–2024	Amanda And Alan's Italian Job	Co-presenter	Alongside Amanda Holden. 16 episodes
2023–present	Changing Ends	Himself	18 episodes; also writer and executive producer
2023–present	Alan Carr's Picture Slam	Host	
2024	Password	Team captain	Series 1 of ITV revival
2025	Amanda & Alan's Spanish Job	Co-presenter	Alongside Amanda Holden
2025	The Celebrity Traitors	Contestant - Traitor	Winner; series 1
2026	Amanda and Alan's Greek Job	Co-presenter	Alongside Amanda Holden
2026	LOL: Last One Laughing	Contestant	Series 2
2026	Secret Genius	Co-presenter	Alongside Susie Dent
TBA	The Masked Singer	Judge	

=== Film ===
Year	Title	Role	Notes
2009	Nativity!	Critic	
2015	The SpongeBob Movie: Sponge Out of Water	Seagull (voice)	UK version
2026	Hoppers	Alan the squirrel	UK version

== Awards and nominations ==
Year	Award	Category	Result	Notes
2001	City Life Awards	Best Newcomer of the Year	Won	
2001	BBC New Comedy Award		Won	
2007	British Comedy Awards	Best Live Stand-up	Won	
2008	British Comedy Awards	Best Comedy Entertainment Personality	Won	
2012	National Television Award	Best Chat Show Host	Won	
2013	British Academy Television Awards	Best Entertainment Performance	Won	
2013	British Comedy Awards	Best Comedy Entertainment Personality	Won	
2015	National Television Awards	Best Chat Show Host	Won	
2026	British Academy Television Awards	Best Entertainment Performance (for Amanda & Alan's Spanish Job)	Nominated	
2026	British Academy Television Awards	Memorable Moment (for winning The Celebrity Traitors)	Won	
2026	National Television Awards	Special Recognition	Won	

== Bibliography ==
- Carr, Alan (2008). Look Who It Is!. HarperCollins Publishers. ISBN 978-0007278220.
- Carr, Alan (2016). Alanatomy: The Inside Story. Penguin Books. ISBN 978-0718180751.
