= Ruth Madoc =

Welsh actress (1943–2022)

- Madoc as Gladys Pugh in Hi-de-Hi!
- Born: Margaret Ruth Llewellyn Baker; 16 April 1943; Norwich, Norfolk, England
- Died: 9 December 2022 (aged 79); Torquay, Devon, England
- Occupation: Actress
- Years active: 1959–2022
- Spouses: Philip Madoc (m. 1961; div. 1981); John Jackson (m. 1982; died 2021)
- Children: Two

Margaret Ruth Llewellyn Jackson (née Baker, formerly Madoc; 16 April 1943 – 9 December 2022), best known by her stage name Ruth Madoc, was a Welsh actress who had a career on stage and screen spanning over 60 years. She was best known for her role as Gladys Pugh in the BBC television comedy Hi-de-Hi! (1980–1988), for which she received a BAFTA TV award nomination for Best Light Entertainment Performance.

== Early life and education ==
Madoc was born Margaret Ruth Llewellyn Baker on 16 April 1943 in Norwich, daughter of George Baker and Iris (née Williams), who worked in healthcare, her father as an administrator and her mother as a nurse. They ran a "poor law" institution for people with severe learning difficulties. Her parents travelled around Britain for much of her childhood, and she was brought up by her Welsh grandmother Etta Williams and her English grandfather at Llansamlet in Swansea.

She later trained at the Royal Academy of Dramatic Art (RADA) in London.

== Career ==
In 1971, Madoc played Fruma Sarah in the film version of the musical Fiddler on the Roof, and appeared as Mrs Dai Bread Two in the film version of Under Milk Wood. She appeared regularly in the entertainment programme Poems and Pints on BBC Wales. She provided one of the alien voices in the Cadbury's Smash commercials in the 1970s, and made a brief appearance in the 1977 film The Prince and the Pauper (aka Crossed Swords).

Madoc appeared in many theatre productions, including the stage version of Under Milk Wood, Steel Magnolias, Agatha Christie thrillers (And Then There Were None), the musical Annie, and many pantomime parts. She appeared twice at the Royal Variety Performance, once in 1982 and again in 1986.

Madoc was best known for her portrayal of Gladys Pugh, one of the lead roles in the television sitcom Hi-de-Hi! (1980–1988), for which she received a BAFTA TV award nomination for Best Light Entertainment Performance. The comedy was set in the fictional 1950s holiday camp Maplins. Madoc's recurring role centred on her unrequited love for the camp entertainment manager Professor Jeffrey Fairbrother (Simon Cadell), and she was notable for her announcements on the camp tannoy with her signature three notes played on a mini xylophone.

In 2004 she appeared in the reality television programme Cariad@Iaith on S4C, in which celebrities went on an intensive course in the Welsh language. In 2005 she appeared as Daffyd Thomas's mother in the second series of BBC sketch show Little Britain.

In 2007 Madoc appeared in the fourth series of LivingTV reality show I'm Famous and Frightened!, which she went on to win. Also in 2007 she appeared as a fictional version of herself in episode 2 of the BBC Radio 2 comedy Buy Me Up TV.

In 2008 she appeared at the Pavilion Theatre in Rhyl, playing the bad fairy in the pantomime Sleeping Beauty, with Sonia and Rebecca Trehearn.

Madoc returned to situation comedy in 2009 and appeared in Big Top on BBC1, alongside Amanda Holden, John Thomson and Tony Robinson.

In January 2015, Madoc appeared as the fairy godmother in the pantomime Cinderella at the Palace Theatre, Mansfield.

In September 2019 she re-joined the cast in the autumn tour of Calendar Girls: The Musical, after recovering from an injury earlier in the year; the show opened at Bournemouth Pavilion on 17 September and ended on 23 November at Chichester Festival Theatre.

== Recognition and honours ==
In 1984, Madoc was the subject of This Is Your Life when she was surprised by Eamonn Andrews. In 1993 she played Mrs Bardell in Pickwick at the Chichester Festival Theatre.

Madoc was awarded an honorary degree by Swansea University in July 2006.

== Personal life and death ==
In 2010, Madoc investigated her family history for the BBC Wales programme Coming Home and learned that she was a distant cousin of British Prime Minister David Lloyd George on her father's side. She had starred in The Life and Times of David Lloyd George in 1981.

Madoc's first husband was the actor Philip Madoc, with whom she appeared in the 1981 TV serial The Life and Times of David Lloyd George. They had a son and a daughter, and were married for 20 years, but divorced in 1981.

In 1982, she married her second husband, John Jackson, with whom she bought a home in Glynneath in 2002. They were married until his death in September 2021.

In December 2022, Madoc was set to appear in the pantomime Aladdin at the Princess Theatre, Torquay. However, on 8 December, a statement posted to Madoc's Instagram account confirmed she had suffered a fall earlier in the week and was unable to appear in the production. After undergoing surgery, Madoc died the following day in hospital, at the age of 79.

== Filmography ==
=== Television ===
Year	Title	Role	Ref.
1973–1976	Hunter's Walk	Betty Smith	
1979	Leave it to Charlie	Myfanwy Morgan	
1980–1988	Hi-de-Hi!	Gladys Pugh/Dempster	
1981	The Life and Times of David Lloyd George	Lizzie Davies	
1986	The Adventure Game	Herself	
1997	The Pale Horse	Sybil Stamfordis	
2004	Mine All Mine	Myrtle Jones	
2005	Little Britain	Daffyd Thomas's Mother	
2009	Big Top	Georgie	
2014	Doctors	Alice Swanson	
2015	Benidorm	Rhiannon	
2015	Get Your Act Together	Contestant	
2015	Tinga Tinga Tales	Whale	
2016	Stella	Mayor Mary Meyer	
2016	Casualty	Bev Whipsnade-Partridge	
2018	Doctors	Jean March	
2019	Casualty	Millie Falconer	
2022	The Tuckers	Alice	
2023	Beyond Paradise	Rosie Colbert	

=== Films ===
Year	Title	Role	Ref.
1971	Fiddler on the Roof	Fruma Sarah	
1971	Under Milk Wood	Mrs Dai Bread Two	
1977	The Prince and the Pauper	Moll	
2001	Very Annie Mary	Mrs Ifans	
2002	Journey Man	Constance	
