= Amanda Holden =

English media personality, actress and singer (born 1971)

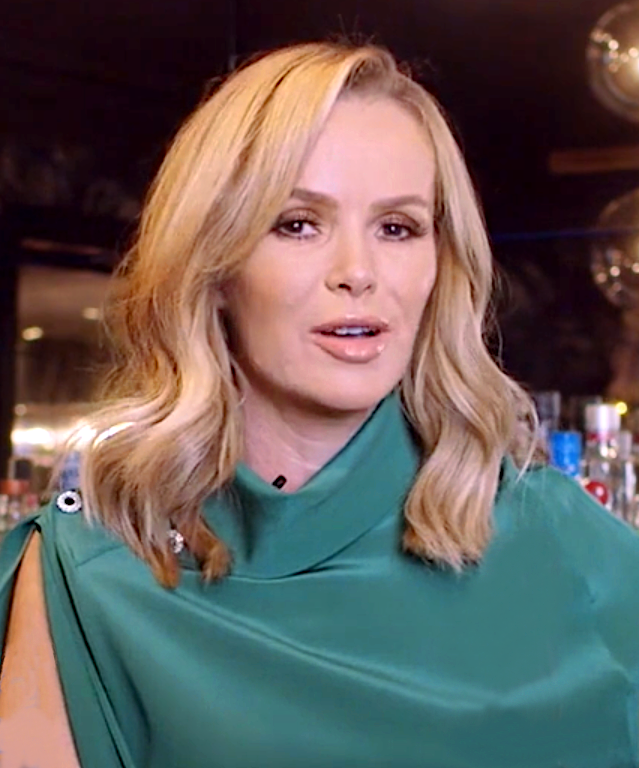
- Holden in 2020
- Born: Amanda Louise Holden; 16 February 1971 (age 55); Portsmouth, Hampshire, England
- Education: Swanmore College; Mountview Academy of Theatre Arts
- Occupations: Television personality; broadcaster; actress; singer
- Years active: 1991–present
- Employers: ITV; Heart
- Spouses: Les Dennis (m. 1995; div. 2003); Chris Hughes (m. 2008)
- Children: 3
- Website: officialamandaholden.com

Amanda Louise Holden (born 16 February 1971) is an English television personality, broadcaster and actress. Since 2007, she has served as a judge on the television talent show competition Britain's Got Talent on ITV. She has also co-hosted the national Heart Breakfast radio show with Jamie Theakston on weekday mornings since 2019.

Holden grew up in Bishop's Waltham and took an interest in acting and musical theatre while at school. She played the title role in the musical stage show Thoroughly Modern Millie in 2004, for which she was nominated for a Laurence Olivier Award. Her acting credits on television include The Grimleys (1998–2001), Kiss Me Kate (1999–2001), Cutting It (2002–2004), Wild at Heart (2006–2008), and Big Top (2009).

Holden has presented various television shows for ITV, including The Sun Military Awards (2009–2014), Superstar (2012), This Morning (2014–2015, 2017), Text Santa (2015), and Give a Pet a Home (2015), as well as BBC One's The Inner Circle (2025–present). In 2020, she released her debut studio album, Songs from My Heart, which reached the top 5 on the UK Albums Chart.

== Early life ==
Holden was born in Portsmouth, Hampshire, and lived in Bishop's Waltham until the age of four and moved to nearby Waltham Chase, and aged nine she joined Bishop's Waltham Little Theatre Company. She has a younger sister, Deborah Lucy, born in 1972.

She attended the secondary community school Swanmore College. At age 16, she relocated to Bournemouth, before moving to South London to attend Mountview Academy of Theatre Arts.

== Career ==
=== Television ===
Holden's first television appearance was as a contestant on the game show Blind Date in 1991.

In 1997 she was a cast member of the Channel 5 sketch show We Know Where You Live alongside Simon Pegg, Fiona Allen and Sanjeev Bhaskar.

From 2006 to 2008, Holden appeared as Sarah Trevanian in three series of ITV's Wild at Heart co-starring Stephen Tompkinson.

Holden's other TV credits include three series of the comedy Kiss Me Kate with Caroline Quentin and Chris Langham, three series of ITV's The Grimleys, one series of Mad About Alice, Celeb with Harry Enfield, BBC series Hearts and Bones with Damian Lewis, the Jonathan Creek episode "The Problem at Gallowes Gate", and a Boxing Day special Agatha Christie's Marple episode "4:50 from Paddington" opposite Geraldine McEwan and John Hannah. She co-starred with Bill Nighy and Tom Courtenay in Ready When You Are, Mr. McGill, a comedy drama by Jack Rosenthal. Holden is a judge on Britain's Got Talent along with Simon Cowell, KSI, and Alesha Dixon. She joined the show in 2007.

She has appeared on British series such as Smack the Pony, EastEnders, Hearts and Bones, and Cutting It.

In 2009 Holden appeared as Lizzie, the Ring Mistress, in the BBC circus sitcom Big Top. In April 2009, it was reported the U.S. network CBS had offered Holden a job as one-time guest presenter on The Early Show, a daytime talk show. On 1 June 2009, she appeared with regular presenters Harry Smith and Maggie Rodriguez. Holden has since signed with CBS as a British correspondent for The Early Show.

From 2009 until 2014, Holden co-presented A Night of Heroes: The Sun Military Awards annually on ITV with Phillip Schofield. In January 2010, she presented her own three-part series, Amanda Holden's Fantasy Lives, in which she tried out three of her dream jobs.

In 2010 Holden co-presented The Door with Chris Tarrant. In 2011, Holden narrated the documentary The Nation's Favourite Bee Gees Song on ITV. On 6 July 2012, Holden guest presented an episode of Lorraine, standing in for Lorraine Kelly. She returned to guest present six further episodes of the show from 4 to 8 April and on 4 July 2016.

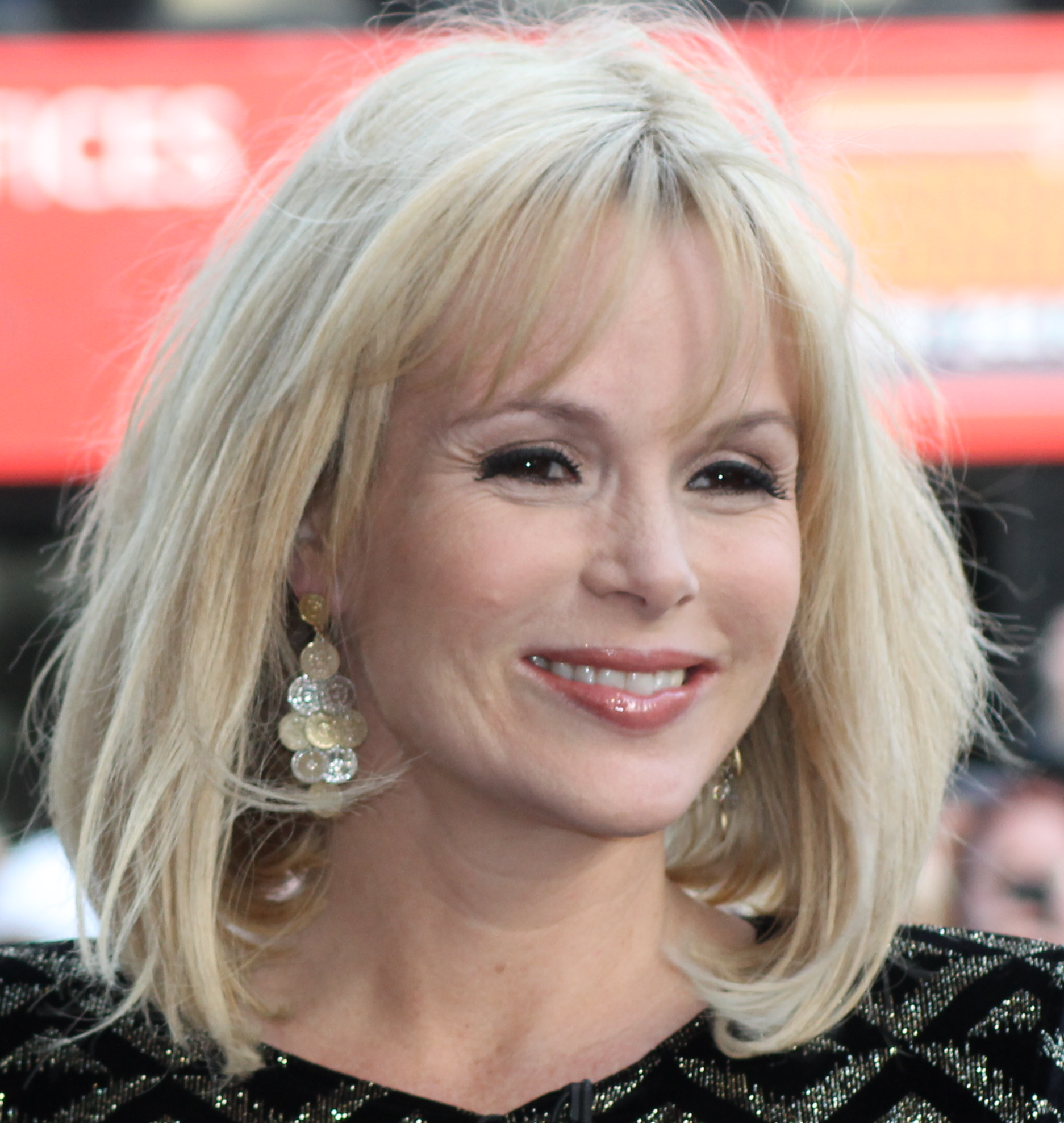
Holden in 2012

In 2012 Holden presented talent show Superstar on ITV. On 24 March 2014, she hosted an episode of the Channel 4 show Dispatches about the treatment for stillbirths and miscarriages.

From 22 September to 18 December 2014, Holden filled in as a co-host on This Morning with Phillip Schofield during Holly Willoughby's maternity leave. She took a short break in January and February 2015 to record the Britain's Got Talent auditions. Christine Lampard stood in for Holden during this time, before the latter returned to the show from 2 March until 17 July 2015. She returned to This Morning in July 2017, to co-present numerous episodes with Ben Shephard.

Holden presented a six-part factual series for ITV called Give a Pet a Home, which worked alongside the RSPCA finding homes for animals. The series aired in April and May 2015.

On 18 December 2015, Holden was part of the presenting team for ITV's Christmas telethon Text Santa. In 2016, she presented I've Got Something To Tell You, a factual series for the W television channel. She appeared as Miss Pentangle in CBBC's The Worst Witch in 2017. Holden made a guest appearance in the Australian soap opera Neighbours as Harriet Wallace in 2022. She began filming for the show in London during October 2021.

In 2021 she started appearing in a new comedy mockumentary series from Bo' Selecta! creator Leigh Francis. The programme was called The Holden Girls: Mandy & Myrtle and featured Francis in drag with heavy make-up as Amanda's nan Myrtle. The show launched on the E4 channel with 601,938 viewers and was repeated on Channel 4. The show was axed after one series.

In 2025 she presented The Celebrity Inner Circle.

=== Theatre ===
Holden has appeared in several stage musicals, and in 2004 was nominated for the Laurence Olivier Award for Best Actress in a Musical for her performance in the West End production of Thoroughly Modern Millie, which closed earlier than expected in June 2004.

Holden finished playing the role Princess Fiona in the original West End production of Shrek The Musical, which began on 6 May 2011. The show opened at the Theatre Royal, Drury Lane on 14 June 2011. She starred with Nigel Lindsay, Richard Blackwood, and Nigel Harman. Holden departed the show on 3 October 2011, ten weeks earlier than planned, to focus on her unborn child and was replaced by Girls Aloud singer Kimberley Walsh. For this role, Holden won the WhatsOnStage.com Theatregoers' Choice Award for Best Actress in a Musical. In October 2016, Holden starred in a West End revival of Stepping Out and reprised her role when it opened at the Vaudeville Theatre in March 2017.

=== Film ===
In 1996, Holden played Pamela in Intimate Relations. In 1999, she appeared as a shoe-shop assistant in Virtual Sexuality. She was uncredited in the 2013 film One Chance.

=== Radio ===
In April 2019, it was announced Holden would replace Emma Bunton as co-host of Heart Breakfast with Jamie Theakston, at the same time as it went national on 3 June.

=== Music ===
In July 2019, Holden signed a recording contract with Virgin EMI Records. In October 2020, she released her debut studio album, Songs from My Heart, through Universal Music. It reached number four on the UK Albums Chart.

=== Other work ===
In July 2009, Holden became a gossip columnist for the News of the World.

From December 2010 until 2012, Holden appeared in television adverts for supermarket chain Tesco. Since June 2012, she has appeared in television commercials for Danone Oykos low-fat yoghurt.

In October 2013, Amanda released her autobiography, No Holding Back, which became a Sunday Times best seller.

In April 2015, she was the new face of the Alpen Brighter Morning Challenge.

In May 2021, she was the British spokesperson for the Eurovision Song Contest. She awarded UK's 12 jury points to France.

== Charity work ==
In October 2007, Holden fronted the breast cancer awareness campaign of Everton F.C. She is a patron of the football club's charity.

On 13 April 2008, Holden ran the London Marathon in four hours and thirteen minutes for the Born Free Foundation.

In September 2011, Holden was sponsored to bake a cupcake for every child in the Great Ormond Street Hospital.

In October 2013, she became a celebrity ambassador for Battersea Dogs & Cats Home following her work with Pedigree Petfoods campaign that she and fellow ambassador Paul O'Grady supported together. Since November 2013, she has presented the Royal Society for the Prevention of Cruelty to Animals (RSPCA) Animal Hero Awards.

In August 2015, Holden raised money for Jeans for Genes and SSAFA via The Big Brew Up.

In May 2016, Holden posed nude for People for the Ethical Treatment of Animals (PETA) in a campaign to promote vegetarianism.

In June 2018, Holden was photographed underwater by Zena Holloway. She posed as a mermaid in an awareness campaign for PETA to highlight the "disgusting treatment" of orca at SeaWorld.

In May 2020, Holden released a debut single 'Over the Rainbow' to raise money for the National Health Service (NHS) during the COVID-19 pandemic.

== Personal life ==
In 1992, while they were both appearing in The Sound of Music, Holden dated George Asprey. She married the comedian Les Dennis in June 1995 at St. Andrew's Church, Richmond Hill in Bournemouth, Dorset. The couple separated temporarily in 2000 after Holden's affair with actor Neil Morrissey. Holden and Dennis separated permanently in December 2002 and divorced in 2003. Around this time, she alleged that she was sexually assaulted by an "unnamed famous comedian" at a public event.

On 20 January 2006, Holden gave birth to her first child, a daughter, conceived with her then fiancé, Chris Hughes. She married Hughes at St Margaret's Church, Babington, near Frome, Somerset, on 10 December 2008, followed by a reception at Babington House, with former Formula One racing driver David Coulthard acting as best man. After a miscarriage in 2010, she suffered the stillbirth of their son at seven months in February 2011. On 23 January 2012, despite medical complications, she gave birth to their third child, a second daughter.

Holden and Hughes reside in Cobham, Surrey, having moved there from Richmond, London in December 2023. Holden also owns a cottage in Sarsden, near Chipping Norton, Oxfordshire which she has been renovating since September 2017.

In December 2016, Holden's ancestry was the subject of a BBC programme in the Who Do You Think You Are? series. The investigation discovered that her Cornish 5x great-grandfather, Collin Thomas, served a year's imprisonment after breaking his apprenticeship as a cordwainer by enlisting in the Royal Navy and leaving the United Kingdom aged 15. Ten years later, while serving in the British Army after the Peninsular War, he met and married a French woman and began a family near Bordeaux, France, then moved his wife and eldest children back to Great Britain. Holden also learned that her grandfather Frank Holden was aboard the RMS Lancastria when it was bombed by the Wehrmacht in June 1940 outside the port of Saint-Nazaire.

In June 2010, Holden campaigned to keep a Sainsbury's supermarket out of Bishop's Waltham. Some residents of her hometown then accused her of a double standard in November 2010 when she signed a deal to appear in advertisements for Tesco, another UK supermarket chain.

Holden supports Premier League football club Everton F.C., attending home and away games when her schedule allows. She is a pescetarian.

== Filmography ==
=== As actress ===
Film
Year	Title	Role	Notes
1996	Intimate Relations	Pamela	
1999	Don't Go Breaking My Heart	Nurse	
1999	Virtual Sexuality	Shoe Shop Assistant	
2013	One Chance	Herself – Judge	Archival footage from Britain's Got Talent. Uncredited
2014	Pudsey the Dog: The Movie	Sally the Dog (voice)	
2026	Hoppers	Amanda the spider (voice)	UK version

Television
Year	Title	Role	Notes
1993	In Suspicious Circumstances	Alice Meadows	2 episodes
1994	EastEnders	Carmen	7 episodes
1997	We Know Where You Live	Various characters	12 episodes
1997	The Bill	Jane	Episode: "Mr. Friday Night"
1997	Thief Takers	Camilla Barker	Episode: "One Last Hurrah"
1998	Goodness Gracious Me	Various roles	5 episodes
1998	Jonathan Creek	Petra	2 episodes: "The Problem at Gallows Gate: Parts 1 & 2"
1998	Hale and Pace	Girl 2	1 episode
1998–2001	Kiss Me Kate	Mel	Series 1–3; 22 episodes
1999	Smack the Pony	Various characters	4 episodes
1999	The Nearly Complete and Utter History of Everything	Geordie's Girlfriend	Television film
1999–2001	The Grimleys	Geraldine Titley	Series 1–3; 22 episodes
2000	Happy Birthday Shakespeare	Alice	Television film
2000–2001	Hearts and Bones	Louise Stanley	Series 1 & 2; 13 episodes
2001	The Hunt	Sarah Campbell	Television film
2001	Now You See Her	Jessica	Television film
2002	Celeb	Debs Bloke	6 episodes
2002–2004	Cutting It	Mia Bevan	Series 1–3; 13 episodes
2003	Ready When You Are, Mr. McGill	Police Officer	Television film
2004	Mad About Alice	Alice	6 episodes
2004	French and Saunders	Cordelia Lear	1 episode
2004	Agatha Christie's Marple	Lucy Eyelesbarrow	1 episode: "4:50 from Paddington"
2006–2008	Wild at Heart	Sarah Trevanion	Series 1–3; 23 episodes
2008	TV Burp	Sarah Trevanion	1 episode
2009	Big Top	Lizzie	6 episodes
2013	Comic Relief: Simon Cowell's Wedding	Wedding Guest	Sketch for Red Nose Day 2013
2017	Who Shot Simon Cowell?	Party Guest	Spoof serial in Ant & Dec's Saturday Night Takeaway
2017–2018	The Worst Witch	Miss Pentangle	Episodes: "Spelling Bee" and "A New Dawn"
2018	The Keith and Paddy Picture Show	Shop Assistant 1	Episode: "Pretty Woman"
2019	Plebs	Rufina	Episode: "The Banquet"
2021	The Holden Girls: Mandy & Myrtle	Amanda Holden	4 episodes
2022	Neighbours	Harriet Wallace	3 episodes

=== As herself ===
Year	Title	Role	Notes
1991	Blind Date	Contestant	1 episode
1998	Wish You Were Here...?	Guest Presenter	1 episode
2000	It's Only TV...but I Like It	Guest	1 episode
2000–2020	Loose Women	Guest	5 episodes
2001	SMTV	Guest Presenter	1 episode
2001–2007	Richard & Judy	Guest	4 episodes
2002	This Is Your Life	Guest	1 episode
2002–2003	Top of the Pops	Guest Presenter	5 episodes
2003	The Kumars at No. 42	Guest	1 episode
2003	Greasemania	Presenter	TV special
2003, 2007	Parkinson	Guest	2 episodes
2004–2008	GMTV	Guest	5 episodes
2005, 2009	The Paul O'Grady Show	Guest	2 episodes
2007	The Dame Edna Treatment	Guest	1 episode
2007–present	Britain's Got Talent	Judge	18 series
2008	Celebrity Ding Dong	Guest	1 episode
2008	Gordon Ramsay: Cookalong Live!	Sous Chef	TV special
2009	Celebrating the Carpenters	Co-presenter	With Ronan Keating
2009	Out of My Depth	Presenter	Documentary
2009	Hell's Kitchen	Guest	2 episodes
2009	Angela and Friends	Guest	1 episode
2009	Bookaboo	Guest	1 episode: "That Rabbit Belongs to Emily Brown"
2009–2010	The Early Show	Guest Presenter	3 episodes
2009–2014	The Sun Military Awards	Presenter	TV special
2009–2016	Alan Carr: Chatty Man	Guest	5 episodes
2009–2020	The One Show	Guest Presenter	5 episodes
2010	Amanda Holden's Fantasy Lives	Presenter	3 episodes
2010	The Door	Co-presenter	With Chris Tarrant
2010–2015	The Graham Norton Show	Guest	4 episodes
2010–2019	A League of their Own	Presenter	5 episodes
2011	The Nation's Favourite Bee Gees Song	Presenter	TV special
2012	Superstar	Presenter	1 series
2012	The Talent Show Story	Guest	4 episodes
2012–2020	Lorraine	Guest Presenter	9 episodes
2013–2017	Ant & Dec's Saturday Night Takeaway	Guest Announcer	7 episodes
2014	Deal or No Deal	Celebrity Contestant	Celebrity edition; 1 episode
2014	Dispatches: Exposing Hospital Heartache	Presenter	TV documentary
2014–2015, 2017–2018	This Morning	Co-presenter	With Phillip Schofield, Ben Shephard and Rylan Clark
2015	Give a Pet a Home	Presenter	1 series
2015	Text Santa	Presenter	TV special
2015	The Dog Rescuers with Alan Davies	Guest	1 episode
2015	Jamie & Jimmy's Friday Night Feast	Guest	1 episode
2016	Who Do You Think You Are?	Guest	TV documentary
2016	I've Got Something To Tell You	Presenter	1 series
2018	Child of Mine	Narrator	TV documentary
2019	Britain's Got Talent: The Champions	Judge	1 series
2019	Shopping with Keith Lemon	Guest	1 episode
2019	Blockbusters	Contestant	1 episode
2019	Celebrity Juice	Panellist	3 episodes
2021	DNA Journey	Guest	TV documentary
2021	Musicals: The Greatest Show	Guest	TV special
2021	Eurovision Song Contest 2021	UK Spokesperson	Annual programme
2021–2022	I Can See Your Voice	Judge	2 series
2022	Britain's Got Talent: The Ultimate Magician	Judge	TV special
2023	Celebrity Hunted	Guest	1 episode
2023	Sing for the King: The Search for the Coronation Choir	Celebrity Mentor	With Gareth Malone, Motsi Mabuse & Rose Ayling-Ellis
2023	Sex: A Bonkers History	Co-presenter	Alongside Dan Jones
2023–2024	Amanda & Alan's Italian Job	Co-presenter	Alongside Alan Carr
2024	RuPaul's Drag Race UK	Guest Judge	Series 6; episode 6: "Snatch Game"
2024	The Royal Variety Performance	Host	TV special
2025	Amanda & Alan's Spanish Job	Co-presenter	Alongside Alan Carr
2025	Cheat: Unfinished Business	Host	Netflix series
2025	The Inner Circle	Host	25 episodes
2026	Amanda & Alan's Greek Job	Co-presenter	Alongside Alan Carr

=== Television advertisements ===
Year	Advert	Role	Notes
2001	PETA	Herself	
2010	News of the World	Herself	
2010–2012	Tesco	Herself	
2012–2014	Danone Oykos	Herself	
2015–2016	Alpen	Herself	
2021–present	JD Williams	Herself	

== Theatre ==
Year	Title	Role	Theatre/company
1993	The Sound of Music	Liesl Von Trapp	Pavilion Theatre, Bournemouth
1994	Arsenic and Old Lace	Elaine Harper	Yvonne Arnaud Theatre
1996–1997	Aladdin	Princess Jasmine	Lyceum Theatre, Sheffield
1998	The Importance of Being Earnest	Cecily Cardew	UK tour
2003–2004	Thoroughly Modern Millie	Millie	Theatre Royal, Drury Lane
2011	Shrek the Musical	Princess Fiona	Theatre Royal, Drury Lane
2016	Stepping Out	Vera	UK tour
2016	Cinderella	Fairy Godmother	London Palladium

== Radio ==
Year	Programme	Channel	Notes
2019–present	Heart UK Breakfast with Jamie and Amanda	Heart	Weekday mornings

== Discography ==
=== Albums ===
- Songs from My Heart (2020)

=== Singles ===
- "Over the Rainbow" (single in aid of NHS Charities Together) (2020), Virgin EMI
- "With You" (2020), Virgin EMI
- "Home For Christmas" (2020) Universal Music Group

== Bibliography ==
- No Holding Back (autobiography)
- The Curious Tale of Fi-Rex (novel) (co-writer)
