= STV Children's Appeal =

Scottish TV series

- STV Children's Appeal logo (2015-)
- Genre: Charity
- Presented by: Lorraine Kelly; Seán Batty
- Country of origin: United Kingdom (Scotland)
- Original language: English
- No. of seasons: 10

Production
- Production locations: STV Studios, Glasgow
- Running time: Various
- Production company: STV Studios

Original release
- Network: STV
- Release: 11 September 2011 – present

Related
- ITV Telethon, Children in Need

STV Children's Appeal (previously named STV Appeal) is a Scottish charity appeal organised by STV and The Hunter Foundation, in aid of the STV Charitable Trust (number SC042429).

== History and format ==
Since its formation in 2011, the key focus of STV Appeal has been the alleviation of child poverty in Scotland. The STV Children's Appeal seeks to address long-term, sustainable change in the lives of those children most at risk by tackling the root causes as well as the effects of poverty and disadvantage.

To help achieve this objective, they engage with corporate bodies, community groups, local businesses, schools, local and central government and the general public. STV has played a key role in engaging with these parties through the utilisation of its on-air and online platforms in order to stimulate public debate on issues relating to child poverty.

Since 2011, over £21m has been raised - every penny of which has gone to help children and young people in Scotland. 1,344 funding awards have been made to children's and young people's projects across Scotland. Over 95,000 children and young people have benefited in each of Scotland's 32 local authority areas. The charity's costs are met by parent company STV plc and The Hunter Foundation meaning every penny raised goes to the front line.

In 2020, the coronavirus pandemic has meant that children and young people living in poverty have been pushed into deeper poverty. As a result, STV Children's Appeal launched an Emergency Coronavirus Campaign.

Several companies have been sponsoring the appeal since its creation, including Lidl.

== Appeals ==
=== 2011 Appeal ===
STV Appeal logo, 2011-2014

The STV Appeal 2011 launched during the summer, with many fundraising events taking place across the country, including Seán Batty's 130-mile Western Isles Challenge, zip-slides (including John MacKay, Sean Batty and "Miss Scotland", Jennifer Reoche), The Hour experts running the 10k, go-karting competitions, boogie-boogie dance challenges, comedy nights, sky-dives, a shark dive by STV Sport presenter Caroline Henderson and race nights; as well as a special celebrity edition of 7.30 for 8, hosted by Kaye Adams – plus much more across the whole country.

- On 11 September that year, the appeal launched its week-long television programmes to raise awareness. Lorraine Kelly hosted "The Big Launch", telling viewers all about the appeal, and showing clips of those affected by child poverty in Scotland, and how they have been helped by charities. In the programme, viewers also saw Billy Boyd lend a hand with one of the projects that will benefit from the money collected, and STV weatherman Seán Batty cycled the Western Isles to raise cash.
- Kaye Adams presented a special celebrity edition of 7.30 for 8 on Tuesday (13 September). Hosted on the Royal Yacht Britannia - Cameron Stout, Liz McColgan and Andy Cameron cooked for six celebrity diners in order to raise money for Scotland's most deserving children.
- On Thursday (15 September), STV News reporter David Marsland narrated One in Four - A quarter of a million Scots children live in poverty - one in four of the youth population. This programme spoke to some of the youngsters caught up in the poverty trap and said what they think can be done to tackle the problem.
- In a live show broadcast on Friday evening (16 September), presenter and trustee Lorraine Kelly announced the current amount raised to some 300 people at STV's studios in Glasgow, as well as fundraisers and studio guests in Aberdeen (presented by Andrea Brymer), Edinburgh (with Stephen Jardine) and Inverness (with STV News reporter Nicola McAlley); and all the viewers watching at home. The total raised by the end of the programme was £1,229,497. Guests included the First Minister, Alex Salmond; representatives from each of the charities who will benefit from the funds; celebrities who have lent their support to the campaign such as Michelle McManus, Des Clarke and Jennie Cook, Michelle Watt, Dorothy Paul, John Amabile, Edward Reid from Britain's Got Talent, "Miss Scotland" Jennifer Reoche, Anita Manning, Stuart Cosgrove and Bruce Devlin; and guests from leading Scottish businesses who have also supported the campaign. The figure raised includes match-funding from the Scottish Government, which has committed to doubling the final amount raised up to £1.5 million.
- Lorraine Kelly returned with an STV Appeal 2011: Where Your Money Went special on Hogmanay, looking at how children have benefited from the fundraising initiative, which received more than £1.2 million from the people of Scotland.

=== 2012 Appeal ===
Lorraine Kelly presented The STV Appeal 2012: Live Show on Friday 7 September, live from STV Studios with a host of Scottish guests including music from Amy MacDonald and Michelle McManus and reports from Kaye Adams.

2012 Appeal raised £1.9million.

=== 2013 Appeal ===
2013 Appeal raised £2,510,002 STV chief executive Rob Woodward said: "We've just had an amazing response. This is the third time that the STV Appeal has run and it's raised over £2.5m for Scotland’s most needy children.It's just a fantastic result. I’m absolutely humbled by the response from everybody across Scotland who made the STV Appeal 2013 the phenomenal success that it has been."

=== 2014 Appeal ===
The Mark Beaumont and Friends STV Appeal 24-hour Cycling Challenge hosted by Infiniti Centre Glasgow over 8 and 9 November 2014. In October 2014 founders of the new organisation Glasgow's Needy appeared on a broadcast by STV news in order to make a plea to the general public to donate and help Glasgow's poor.

The 2014 STV Appeal raised £2,610,427

=== 2015 Appeal ===
In 2015, the charity was renamed STV Children's Appeal.

- A number of special programmes were broadcast; "The Kids who care", "Lorraine Kelly and Friends" and " Sean Batty And Friends"
- Live show was broadcast on 16 October 2015 at 20.00 and again at 21.00, once again presented by trustee Lorraine Kelly at STV's studios in Glasgow, as well as fundraisers and studio guests in Aberdeen (presented by Andrea Brymer), Edinburgh (with STV Edinburgh crew) and Dundee (with STV News reporter Lauria Miller);
- An owner of a cat who plays the lottery to raise money for its vet bills donated £400 to the STV Children's Appeal. Ms Campbell, who has retinitis pigmentosa, told STV News: "I just really like Sean Batty and it was easy to change his name."Sean is an exceptionally lucky cat so I give half the winnings to the STV Appeal. We always play his date of birth for the numbers."

=== 2016 Appeal ===
Lorraine Kelly and Sean Batty once again hosted the annual telethon. Kelly got her own show leading up to the telethon called Lorraine & Friends. John MacKay and Ewen Cameron were also heavily involved in this year's appeal.

=== 2017 Appeal ===
Lorraine Kelly once again fronted this year's appeal, with the telethon live from STV HQ in Glasgow. Sean Batty and Jennifer Reoch hosted from Edinburgh, David Farrell hosted from the STV HQ balcony, and Ewen Cameron hosted live from the Call Centre. During the Telethon, First Minister Nicola Sturgeon took calls live from the Call Centre. There was several appeal videos made for this year's appeal, starring the likes of Carol Smilie, Andrea McLean and Jackie Brambles.

== See also ==
- Social care in Scotland
- Children in Need
- ITV Telethon
