= Castlehead High School =

State secondary school in Renfrewshire, Scotland

Location
- Canal Street; Paisley, Renfrewshire, PA1 2HL; Scotland; 55.83931°N 4.43316°W

Information
- Type: State secondary school
- Motto: Work hard be kind
- Established: 1972; 54 years ago
- Local authority: Renfrewshire Council
- Head teacher: Gordon Menzies
- Years offered: 6
- Gender: Mixed
- Age range: 11 - 18 years
- Enrolment: 708
- Houses: Maxwellton, Oakshaw, Camphill
- Colours: Brown, blue and gold
- Website: www.castleheadhigh.com

Castlehead High School is a non-denominational, mixed state secondary school in Paisley, Renfrewshire, Scotland. It was opened in 1971. In 1989, John Neilson High School (founded as the John Neilson Institution in 1852) merged into Castlehead High School.

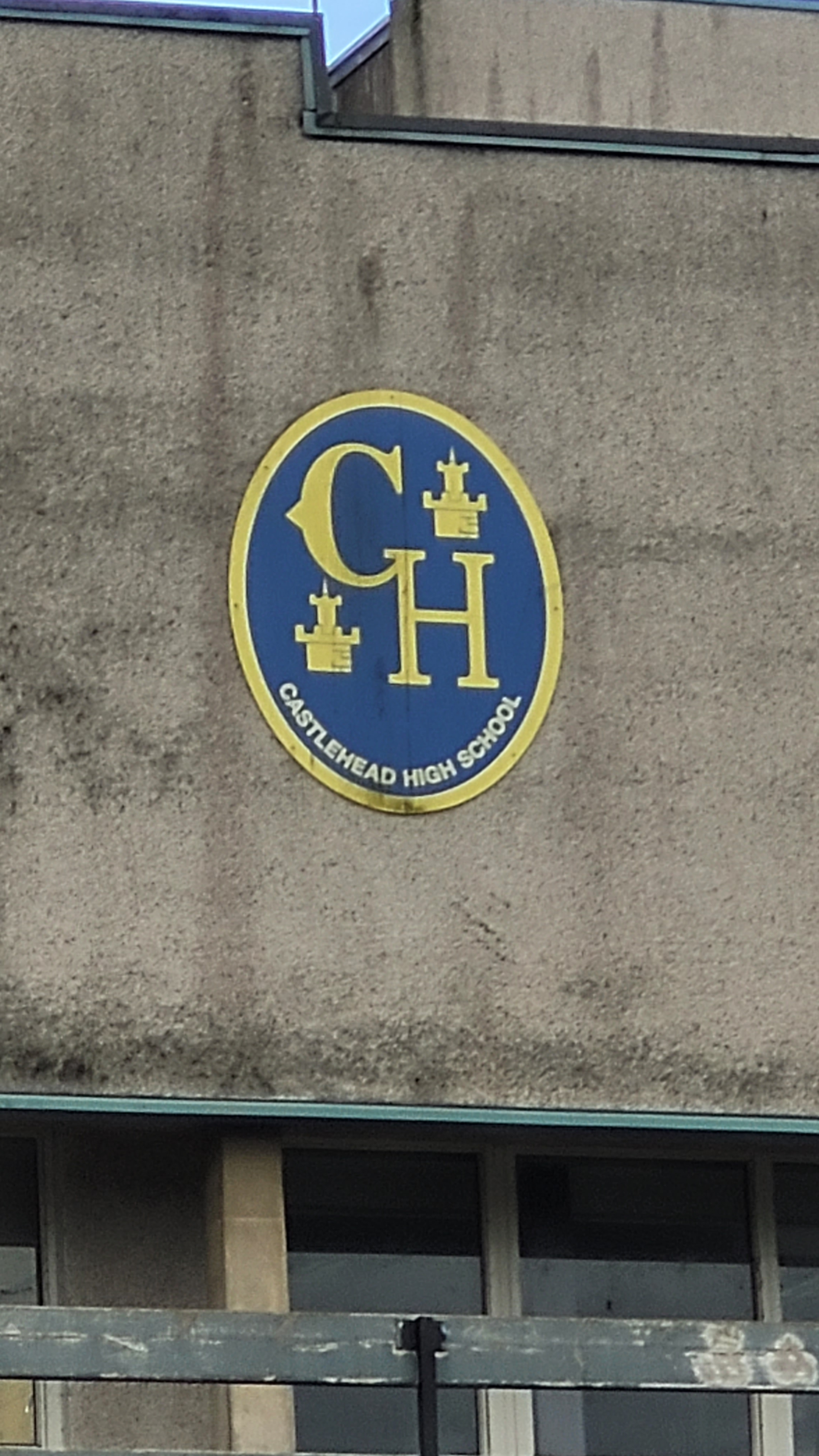

== Associated Primary Schools ==
=== Primary Schools ===
The primary schools that feed into Castlehead are Glencoats Primary School, Wallace Primary School and West Primary School.

== Sports ==
Castlehead is one of six Scottish Football Association Schools of Football. Under this program, twenty first-year students receive daily coaching, development and recovery sessions and other academic and social development activities. The Schools of Football program is funded through the Scottish Football Association's partnership with Cashback For Communities, a Scottish Government scheme that gives communities illicit monies seized from criminals.

On 8 September 2008, Castlehead hosted the draw for the first round of the 2008–09 Scottish Cup.

The school's gym was closed in 2023 after reinforced autoclaved aerated concrete was found in the roof.

== Awards ==
One area of the school's performance identified as needing improvement on the 2005 evaluation was attendance. In recognition of the effort the school faculty, students and parents made, in 2006 the school won the Scottish Education Award: "Better Behaviour and Attendance Award".

Philip Lawrence Award, in recognition of the school's paired reading program where senior pupils help junior pupils develop their reading skills.

== Notable alumni ==
- Elena Baltacha, tennis player
- Seán Batty, STV weatherman
- Majid Haq, cricket player
- Richard Madden, actor
- Iain Martin, journalist
