= Seán Batty =

British meteorologist

Sean Batty
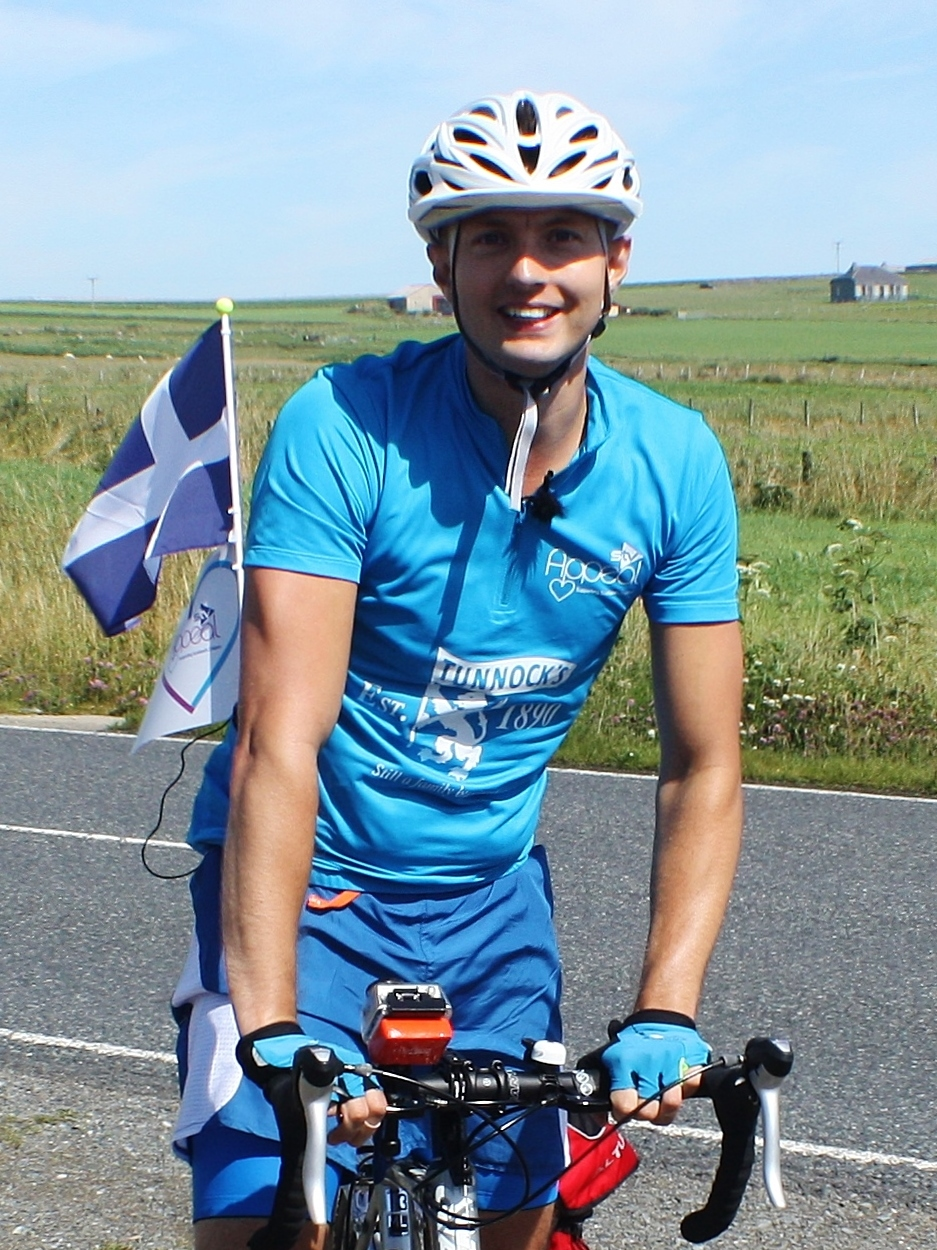
- Batty cycling in Shetland for a 2013 charity event
- Born: 6 May 1982 (age 44); Paisley, Renfrewshire, Scotland
- Presenting career
- Show: STV News; STV Children's Appeal; Sean's Scotland
- Station: STV
- Style: Weather forecaster
- Country: United Kingdom
- Previous show: BBC Weather

Seán Batty (born 6 May 1982) is a meteorologist, currently working for STV. Before this he was a Broadcast Assistant at the BBC Weather Centre and occasionally presented forecasts in BBC regions.

== Early life ==
Born in Paisley, he attended Castlehead High School and studied meteorology at the University of Reading. His interest in meteorology began when he was only seven years old, after receiving a BBC weather kit for his birthday. Batty became the weather forecaster for the school newspaper as well as the regional newspaper, the Paisley Daily Express, for a few months during the summer of 1996.

== Career ==
Batty joined the Met Office as a weather observer at the School of Army Aviation at Middle Wallop airbase near Andover, Hampshire. He later worked with the ITV Weather team preparing TV weather graphics and maps for S4C, UTV and ITV.

In 2004, he joined the BBC as a broadcast assistant. Seán has been working in Scotland for STV Weather since August 2007.

Batty was nominated for the BAFTA Scotland Lloyds TSB Scotland Award for Most Popular Scottish Presenter in November 2008, losing out to Lorraine Kelly.

Seán has appeared as a guest and presenter of various STV Hogmanay specials since 2017.

== Personal life ==
He learned Gaelic and hoped to be fluent in time for the Paisley MOD in 2013.

Sean has been a supporter and Judge for part of the Breast Way Round Charity event since 2008. The event consists of female motorcyclists participating in a sponsored motorcycle ride round Scotland, and as part of the event the male motorcyclists who participate (often partners, friends and family of female participants) will dress up in fancy dress including decorated bras which are then judged as part of a competition at the event location where the ride ends. Sean acted as the judge for the Bra competition during the first year of the event and it was so popular that he has been asked back every year since with the competition getting bigger and better each year, with Sean himself participating in part of the 2011 ride and sporting a special weather themed Bra during that year's event.

In September 2012, 16-year old Lee Glen was charged after leaving a barrage of anti-gay abuse and offensive expletives against Batty, via Twitter, in June of that year. Glen appeared at Paisley Sheriff Court and admitted to posting a message to Batty that was grossly offensive, indecent or menacing in nature. Batty told the court he had been shocked by its content. Glen later issued a public apology for his behaviour.
