= Songs from My Heart =

Studio album by Amanda Holden
- Released: 2 October 2020
- Recorded: 2020
- Length: 50:44
- Label: Universal Music; Virgin EMI

Songs from My Heart is the debut studio album by the English actress, singer and media personality Amanda Holden, released by Universal Music on 2 October 2020. It is a covers album consisting mainly of show tunes, along with covers of Christina Perri's "A Thousand Years" and Billy Joel's "Lullabye (Goodnight, My Angel)".

Songs from My Heart entered the UK Albums Chart at number 4 and remained in the chart for 6 weeks.

== Track listing ==
Songs from My Heart track listing
No.	Title	Length
1.	"Not While I'm Around"	2:45
2.	"With You"	4:28
3.	"Don't Cry for Me Argentina"	5:34
4.	"When She Loved Me"	3:08
5.	"Hushabye Mountain"	3:20
6.	"A Thousand Years"	4:34
7.	"I Know Him So Well" (with Sheridan Smith)	4:12
8.	"I Dreamed a Dream"	4:18
9.	"Over the Rainbow"	3:09
10.	"Somewhere"	2:51
11.	"As If We Never Said Goodbye"	4:51
12.	"Tightrope"	4:01
13.	"Lullabye (Goodnight, My Angel)"	3:33
Total length:		50:44

== Charts ==
Chart performance for Songs from My Heart
Chart (2020)	Peak position
Scottish Albums (OCC)	7
UK Albums (OCC)	4
