= The Inner Circle (game show) =

British reality television series

- Also known as: The Celebrity Inner Circle
- Genre: Game show
- Presented by: Amanda Holden
- Country of origin: United Kingdom
- Original language: English
- No. of series: 1 (regular); 2 (celebrity)
- No. of episodes: 25 (regular); 14 (celebrity)

Production
- Executive producer: David Marshall
- Production locations: Kelvin Hall, Glasgow
- Running time: 45 minutes
- Production company: Tern Television

Original release
- Network: BBC One
- Release: 4 October 2025 – present

The Inner Circle is a BBC game show which premiered on 6 October 2025. The Celebrity Inner Circle premiered on 4 October 2025. It is hosted by Amanda Holden.

== Development ==
The series was announced in January 2025. The show is reportedly inspired by shows such as The Traitors, Golden Balls and The Weakest Link.

It is filmed and produced in Glasgow. BBC Studios holds format and distribution rights.

== Episodes ==
There are 25 episodes and 6 special celebrity episodes. The celebrity editions include a celebrity paired with a contestant. In April 2026, it was announced that the daytime version had been axed but the celebrity edition would continue.

=== Transmissions ===
Series	Start date	End date	Episodes
Regular
1	6 October 2025	7 November 2025	25
Celebrity
1	4 October 2025	8 November 2025	6
2	12 September 2026	31 October 2026	8

== See also ==
- Shafted, 2001 game show with a similar format
