= Big Top (British TV series) =

- Big Top's title card
- Genre: Comedy
- Written by: Daniel Peak
- Directed by: Marcus Mortimer
- Starring: Amanda Holden; John Thomson; Tony Robinson; Ruth Madoc; Bruce Mackinnon; Sophie Thompson
- Theme music composer: Al Collingwood
- Composer: Al Collingwood
- Country of origin: United Kingdom
- Original language: English
- No. of series: 1
- No. of episodes: 6

Production
- Executive producers: Jed Leventhall; Simon Wilson
- Producers: John Stroud; Marcus Mortimer
- Running time: 30 minutes

Original release
- Network: BBC One; BBC HD
- Release: 25 November – 30 December 2009

Big Top is a BBC television sitcom which first aired on 25 November 2009 and was set in and around a travelling circus. The show was broadcast on BBC One and BBC HD simultaneously. The series revolved around the performers and backstage staff of Circus Maestro. There were six episodes, each of which was thirty minutes in length. Big Top was not recommissioned for a second series and was formally cancelled by the BBC in February 2010.

== Plot ==
Lizzie the ring mistress (Holden) must overcome all of the problems which get thrown at her during the production of the circus show. The circus features a husband and wife clown team (Thomson and Thompson), who aren't as funny as they believe they are, and Erasmus (Robinson) is a cynical soundman. Georgie (Madoc) is the grande dame of Circus Maestro, and Boyco (Mackinnon) is an east European acrobat who is still learning about the ways of the English world.

== Cast ==
- Amanda Holden as Lizzie the Ring Mistress
  Lizzie is the daughter of Circus Maestro's founder, but when her father ends up in prison for fraud she becomes the ring mistress. Lizzie grew up in the circus and loves it with all her heart. Her only regret is that she has absolutely no circus skills. She can't juggle, can't spin plates and never even took the stabilisers off her unicycle.
- John Thomson as Plonky the Clown/Uncle Geoff
  Geoff is one half the clown double act, Plinky and Plonky, the husband and wife team involving him and his wife Helen. One problem being, their act isn't very funny since Geoff hasn't got a funny bone in his body.
- Tony Robinson as Erasmus
  Erasmus is the cynical soundman who has a scheme and con for everything. Anything that involves him getting cash he will try it.
- Ruth Madoc as Georgie
  Georgie is the grande dame of the circus and has an act with her dog, David, a West Highland Terrier. She cares a lot about David but often uses him as part of little schemes. When Boyco gets a job as advertising accident claims and compensation, Georgie tries to use David to claim saying he is suffering with stress.
- Bruce Mackinnon as Boyco
  Boyco is the acrobat of the circus and he's also madly in love with Lizzie. He is 28 years old and does juggling, high wire, balloon animals and trampoline.
- Sophie Thompson as Plinky the Clown/Auntie Helen
  Helen acts as the other half of Plinky and Plonky. Helen is Lizzie's auntie and always tries to help out Lizzie in any way she possibly can, even if she fails. She tries to help Lizzie with finding love but Lizzie doesn't like any of the men Helen matches her up with.

== Guest stars ==
=== Episode 1 ===
- Patrick Baladi as Andy James
- Ross Gurney-Randall as Jimmy Steed
- Michael Elliot as an elderly man

=== Episode 2 ===
- Nick Holder as The immigration official
- Holly Hayes as the registrar
- Tom Goodman Hill as the advert voice-over
- The Krankies as themselves

== Development ==
The BBC released an announcement on 22 January 2009 that the series had begun filming. Big Bear Films produced the series. Big Top was filmed in front of a live studio audience at Teddington Studios and on location in and around London. The show was written by Daniel Peak, directed by Marcus Mortimer and co-produced by John Stroud and Marcus Mortimer. It was commissioned by Jay Hunt, Controller of BBC One, and Lucy Lumsden, Controller of Comedy Commissioning for the BBC. The executive producers were Jed Leventhall for Big Bear and Simon Wilson for the BBC. Prior to broadcast, the second and third episodes were in reverse order; "Skydiver" then "Visa".

== Reception ==
Reception to the show was negative. In a review of the opening episode, Michael Deacon in The Daily Telegraph described it as "unfunny and outdated", saying that "the cast weren’t so much playing characters as reading aloud from a dog-eared joke book for half an hour." Tom Sutcliffe in The Independent said that it was "one of those programmes that get you wondering about the commissioning process." Sam Wollaston of The Guardian commented that the jokes were so obvious that he invented a game, whereby he would pause the show after the set up and ask his girlfriend to guess the punchline. The sitcom was named the worst new sitcom of 2009 by the visitors to the British Comedy Guide. Daily Mirror TV critic Jim Shelley included the series on his list of the Top 20 TV flops, describing it as "Mind-blowingly awful".

The harsh criticism that the sitcom received, and the likelihood that it would be axed after one season, led to its being used as a cipher on Richard Bacon's BBC 6Music show during 2009–10. To circumvent instructions given to 6Music presenters that they should not discuss on-air the planned closure of the station, Bacon frequently voiced his strong objection to "the BBC's plans to cancel Big Top" and encouraged listeners to do the same.

== Cancellation ==
Following speculation that the series would be returning, the BBC announced in February 2010 that they would not recommission Big Top for a second series.

== Episodes ==
=== Series 1 (2009) ===
Episode number	Episode title	Plot	Airdate	Viewers (audience share)
1	"Boyfriend"	The circus is sabotaged by a rival one in town, and Lizzie is determined to get revenge. A health and safety inspector also pays a visit. As Lizzie and her Auntie Helen start talking about her past boyfriends it helps her to realise that she likes him. But the date ends in disaster when he insults the cast and crew of her circus and suggest she leaves...	25 November 2009	3.3 million (15%)
2	"Visa"	Boyco the acrobat gets a small job advertising an agency that deals with accident claims and giving out compensation. Lizzie thinks this is great because now the circus is being promoted. But her happiness is soon gone when she receives a visit from immigration and it appears that her star acrobat is eastern European and has no work visa. Being desperate to keep Boyco, Lizzie is willing to go to any lengths to make him legitimate, even if that means marriage but Plonky the clown wants him banged to rights. As always Auntie Helen is always there to save the day!	2 December 2009	
3	"Skydiver"	Milo the skydiver is injured a replacement needs to be found quickly. Her options are limited to a suicidal man, a Chinese hypnotist and a reluctant West Highland terrier. It is not looking hopeful...	9 December 2009	
4	"Dad"	Lizzie is happy after finding out that her circus has a chance to perform in the opening ceremony of the 2012 summer olympics. Erasmus has a plan to get her dad out of prison, to dig up some cash for the event.	16 December 2009	
5	"Clown"	The sales are at an all-time low when Geoff becomes ill. Lizzie attempts to fill in as the clown herself. The rest of the members of the circus attempt to make money by any means possible.	23 December 2009	
6	"Thief"	The police notify Lizzie that the members of the circus are prime suspects for a series of local robberies. Lizzie suspects Erasmus and banishes him, before the criminal underworld arrive at the circus.	30 December 2009	
