= Shafted =

British game show

- Genre: Game show
- Directed by: Mick Thomas
- Presented by: Robert Kilroy-Silk
- Theme music composer: Paul Farrer
- Country of origin: United Kingdom
- Original language: English
- No. of series: 1
- No. of episodes: 20 (16 unaired)

Production
- Executive producer: Adam Wood
- Producers: Shirley Jones; Phil Parsons
- Production location: Pinewood Studios
- Running time: 30 minutes (inc. adverts)
- Production company: Initial

Original release
- Network: ITV
- Release: 5 November – 26 November 2001

Shafted is a British game show that aired on ITV from 5 to 26 November 2001 and was hosted by Robert Kilroy-Silk.

== Format ==
The game begins with six players and is played in five rounds. In the first round, each player must secretly declare how much money they would like to receive, to a maximum of £25,000. Once the amounts are revealed, the person who has asked for the largest amount is immediately eliminated from the game and receives nothing. Each of the other five is credited with the amount they requested.

In each of the next three rounds, the host reads the first few words of a question and invites the players to wager a portion of their totals. Once the wagers are entered, the host reads the entire question and the player who made the largest wager has to answer it within a 10-second time limit. A correct answer adds the wager to their total, while a miss deducts it. Once the host has asked as many questions as there are players still in the game, the leader chooses one opponent to eliminate with no winnings. The chosen opponent then has an opportunity to plead their case into why they should stay in the game, after which the leader can decide whether to stick with their decision or change their mind over who to eliminate. The totals of all remaining players are then increased to match that of the leader.

At the beginning of the third round, each player is given an option to "Shift," where they can force an opponent to answer a question meant for them. A right answer subtracts the wager of the shifting player from their own total and credits it to the opponent, while a wrong answer takes the wager away from the opponent's total. Each player can use this option once during the third or fourth rounds.

A complete question often leads in a very different direction from that suggested by its incomplete prompt. Example:

- Prompt: Which major planet...
- Question: Which major Planet Hollywood investor played the lead in the 2000 remake of Get Carter? (Answer: Sylvester Stallone)

In the fifth and final round, the two remaining players stand at podiums facing each other in a form of the prisoner's dilemma, with the leader's total at stake, up to a total of £2,500,000. A brief snippet of a backstage interview with each player is shown to the audience, after which both of them must secretly decide to "share" or "shaft." Their choices are revealed to the home viewers, but not to the audience, host, or players, and they are then given a chance to discuss the situation and change their decisions if they wish. Their final choices determine the fate of the jackpot.

- If both choose "share," each wins half the money.
- If one chooses "share" and the other "shaft," the shafting player wins all the money.
- If both choose "shaft," neither wins any money.

== Reception ==
The show was dropped after four episodes, and was listed as the worst British television show of the 2000s in the Penguin TV Companion.

In 2012 Richard Osman, writing for The Guardian, named Shafted among four of UK TV's worst ever game shows, citing the poor choice of host for the show.

== International versions ==
=== Australia ===
An Australian version of the show starring Red Symons ran between 11 February to 5 April 2002 on the Nine Network. The show was axed in April 2002 due to poor ratings. Only one time in the show, two contestants chose to share and won a lot of money.

In this version, if in the final round one contestant decided to shaft while the other contestant decided to share, the person who shafted would not only win all of the cash (which is the total winnings of the two finalists) but would get to play in the next game with the title of "Master Shafter". When the series started, the other contestants knew who the master shafter was, and that person was regularly eliminated first. This was later changed so that the master shafter was not revealed to the other contestants until the very end of the show.

Also in the Australian version, contestants can bid up to $500 where the contestant who makes the highest bid gets eliminated in the first round. Unlike the British version, the majority of the questions that were asked were toss-up questions. From round two onwards, the current player with the highest amount picks one of the four topics where a set of questions are given out for the contestants to answer. Before this could happen, contestants must make a bid as to how much money they are willing to risk for every question they get correct. If two or more pick the same bid, the one who locked their bid the fastest will get it and the next contestants bid will be $5 less to avoid two or more players having the same bid.

During the set of questions, contestants buzz in for a chance to answer and win or lose their bidding amount for every question they answer correctly or not. A player who loses all of their money is locked out for the rest of the round. After the set, half of a question is read for the contestants where they must bid an amount to have the right of answering the question. The highest bidder gets a chance to answer it with the second half of that question revealed. After this, the contestant with the highest score has the right to eliminate another contestant. That eliminated contestant has thirty seconds to persuade that contestant to stay in the game. (One time a contestant didn't bother and wanted to be eliminated.) Then the contestant must decide whether to stick with their decision or change their mind, if they change their mind, that contestant is eliminated and gets no say to save themselves. At the end of the round, all contestants have the same amount equal to the leader.

=== Other versions ===
Pilots for Shafted were made for seven other European countries, including Italy, Poland, Spain, Germany and Sweden as well as in the United States for CBS but none of them got picked up apart from the Russian version, of which there were two, Ставка and Искушение, and the Dutch version, Deelt Iet of Deelt Iet Niet. The pilot format started with ten players giving themselves a secret cash amount to start with, the four greediest players as well as the contender asking for the least amount of money get immediately eliminated. The other five players enter the quiz round played the same way as in the UK version, with two players left at the end of the game who had to decide whether to share or to shaft. The pilot episodes were recorded in 2001 in Aalsmeer, The Netherlands, at the studio set of the Dutch game show Miljoenenjacht (the original version of the Deal or No Deal format). The title screen music is taken from the end credits of Blade Runner; the overall music was composed by Keith Strachan and Matthew Strachan. Contestants could bid up to £50,000 in the U.K. pilot. Three pilot episodes of the Polish version, Wielki Poker, were produced and aired in October 2001, before the British version came to air.

In the Dutch version it should also be noted that the game was played with 7 contestants rather than 6 and that the game was played with 5 as the contestant who bid lowest was removed from the game at the start, as well as the highest bidder; and that in the international pilots, 10 players started the game rather than 6.

In the final round of the Russian versions, if both players chooses "share", then the richest player must decide how will the money be split.

In the final round of the German pilot, the player who accumulated the highest total has their initial decision revealed. They subsequently listen to their opponent's interview conducted moments prior, before chatting with the host on whether their decision is appropriate.

Country	Name	Local name of 'Share'	Local name of 'Shaft'	Presenter	Channel	Transmission
Australia	Shafted	Share	Shaft	Red Symons	Nine Network	11 February 2002 – 5 April 2002
Germany	Shafted	Fifty Fifty	Alles	?	?	2001 (pilot rejected)
Italy	Shafted	Share	Shaft	?	?	2001 (pilot rejected)
Netherlands	Deelt-ie't of Deelt-ie't Niet	Deelt	Deelt Niet	Piet Zoomers	SBS6	2002
Poland	Wielki Poker	?	?	?	TVN	10 October 2001 – 27 October 2001
Russia	Ставка	За	Против	Vladimir Lebedev	Russia Channel	30 August 2002 – 20 December 2002
Russia	Искушение	За	Против	Irina Apeksimova	TVS	22 March 2003 – 19 June 2003
Russia	Искушение	Да	Нет	Irina Apeksimova	TVS	22 March 2003 – 19 June 2003
Spain	Que te den	Mitad	Todo	Juan y Medio	?	2001 (pilot rejected)
Sweden	Shafted	Share	Shaft	?	?	2001 (pilot rejected)
United States	Shafted	Share	Shaft	Mark L. Walberg	CBS	2002 (pilot rejected)

== See also ==
- The Inner Circle, 2025 game show with a similar format
