= I've Got Something To Tell You =

- Genre: Reality
- Presented by: Amanda Holden
- Country of origin: United Kingdom
- Original language: English
- No. of series: 1
- No. of episodes: 6

Production
- Executive producer: Hilary Rosen
- Running time: 60 minutes (inc. adverts)
- Production company: UKTV

Original release
- Network: W
- Release: 3 October – 7 November 2016

I've Got Something To Tell You is British television series that has aired on the W channel from 3 October to 7 November 2016. The programme, presented by Amanda Holden, aims to reunite people offering support as friends, partners and relations break life-changing news to loved ones in front of the cameras.

== Synopsis ==
With the help of Amanda Holden the series offers a platform for people who are desperate to tell something to someone. It gives an insight into others lives and emotions, as they tell their loved ones something they have been putting off for a while. Amanda is seen watching from the sideline acting as a waitress and mediator, offering support when needed. All confessions are made public in the setting of an English country retreat.
