= The Sun Military Awards =

UK annual military awards ceremony

- Sponsored by: The Sun
- Location: Hampton Court Palace (2008); Imperial War Museum (2009–12); National Maritime Museum (2013–14); Guildhall (2015–2017); Banqueting House (2018-)
- Country: United Kingdom
- Hosted by: Tess Daly (2008); Phillip Schofield (2009–14); Amanda Holden (2009–14); Tom Bradby (2015); Lorraine Kelly (2016–)
- First award: 2008

Television/radio coverage
- Network: Sky1 (2008); ITV (2009–14); Forces TV (2015–)
- Runtime: 90 minutes (inc. adverts)

The Sun Military Awards (televised as A Night of Heroes: The Sun Military Awards since 2009) is an annual awards ceremony which honours members of the British armed forces and civilians involved with the forces. The awards are organised and sponsored by The Sun newspaper. The award trophies are designed and hand-made by British Silversmith and porcelain designer Kerry O'Connor.

During the televised ceremony, awards known as "Millies" are given out. The awards and their recipients are chosen by a select panel of ten judges, made up of national figures and military chiefs. Nominees of all but one of the categories are selected by the general public, with the remaining category winner chosen by the judges.

The first ceremony aired on Sky1 and was hosted by Tess Daly, but from 2009 until 2014, the awards were televised on ITV and are presented by Phillip Schofield and Amanda Holden. It currently airs on Forces TV.

== Ceremonies ==
Year	Presenter	Broadcaster	Location
2008	Tess Daly	Sky1	Hampton Court Palace
2009	Phillip Schofield; Amanda Holden	ITV	Imperial War Museum
2010	Phillip Schofield; Amanda Holden	ITV	Imperial War Museum
2011	Phillip Schofield; Amanda Holden	ITV	Imperial War Museum
2012	Phillip Schofield; Amanda Holden	ITV	Imperial War Museum
2013	Phillip Schofield; Amanda Holden	ITV	National Maritime Museum
2014	Phillip Schofield; Amanda Holden	ITV	National Maritime Museum
2015	Tom Bradby	Forces TV	Guildhall
2016	Lorraine Kelly	Forces TV	Guildhall
2017	Lorraine Kelly	Forces TV	Banqueting House, Whitehall
2018	Lorraine Kelly	Forces TV	Banqueting House, Whitehall
2019	Lorraine Kelly	Forces TV	Banqueting House, Whitehall

== 2008 ==
The 2008 award ceremony was presented by Tess Daly, taking place on 16 December at Hampton Court Palace and was aired on Sky1 before Christmas that year.

Award	Details	Recipient(s)
Best recruit	For a young recruit, of any rank and service, who has demonstrated outstanding potential in initial training.	Able Seaman Jamie Campbell
Best Armed Forces Animal	For the most remarkable service from a service animal; to recognise the vital role of animals in the forces; on operations, during ceremonial duties or at home.	Treo and Corporal Dave Heyhoe
Life Saver Award	For a service individual, whether a member of the medical chain or not, who has performed an extraordinary life-saving act)	Lance Corporal Jan Fourie
Most Outstanding Airman	For the individual who has made the most outstanding contribution to the RAF over the last year.	Warrant Officer Jack MacFarlane
True Grit: Group	For a small unit or group of men or women from any service who have together performed a single act of true grit – through courage, determination or self-sacrifice – be it on or off duty.	Royal Marines Armoured Support Group
Support to the Armed Forces	For a civilian, a civil servant, a contractor or just an ordinary member of the public, who has provided invaluable help to the Armed Forces.	Bryn Parry, Emma Parry, Jeremy and Francie Clarkson; Help For Heroes
Most Outstanding Sailor or Marine	For the individual who has made the most outstanding contribution to the Royal Navy or Royal Marines over the past year.	Leading Seaman Lee Duffy
Most Outstanding Soldier	For the individual who has made the most outstanding contribution to the Army over the past year.	WO2 Ian Farrell
True Grit: Individual	For an individual serviceman or woman who has performed a single act of true grit – through courage, determination or self-sacrifice – be it on or off duty.	Captain Simon Cupples
Overcoming Adversity	To recognise individuals who have suffered injury or illness, and yet have overcome their significant difficulties with fortitude.	Lance Bombardier Ben Parkinson
Best Unit	The winner of this award can either be a major or minor unit that has excelled consistently over the year, for example with notable achievements on an operational deployment.	The Chinook Force
Judge's Award for Special Recognition	For outstanding service by an individual or group, and not recognised elsewhere.	Christine Bonner; 2nd Battalion, Parachute Regiment

== 2009 ==
The 2009 award ceremony took place on 15 December 2009, and was broadcast on ITV on 21 December at 9pm. Phillip Schofield and Amanda Holden were the presenters for the first time.

The judges included John Terry, Jeremy Clarkson, Kelly Holmes, Ross Kemp and four ex-Service chiefs.

Award	Recipient(s)
Overcoming Adversity	Marine Ben McBean, 40 Commando Royal Marines, Plymouth, Devon
Most Outstanding Sailor or Marine	Able Seaman Medical Assistant Kate Nesbitt MC, attached to 1st Battalion, The Rifles, Plymouth, Devon
Most Outstanding Soldier	Corporal Mark Powis MC, 1st Battalion The Rifles, Weston-super-Mare, Somerset
Most Outstanding Airman	Flight Lieutenant John Walmsley, RAF Odiham, from Edinburgh
Best Reservist	Able Seaman Edmund Grandison, HMS Forward, Royal Naval Reserve, from Tyseley, Birmingham
Support to the Armed Forces	The town of Wootton Bassett, Wiltshire
Life Saver Award	Corporal Carl Thomas, 2nd Battalion, The Rifles, Liverpool
True Grit Home	Acting Chief Petty Officer David Rigg, Fleet Air Arm, RNAS Culdrose, Cornwall
True Grit Overseas	Sergeant Andrew McNulty, 2nd Battalion, The Mercian Regiment, Catterick, North Yorkshire
Best Unit	The 2nd Battalion, The Rifles, Ballykinler, Northern Ireland
Judges' Award for Special Recognition	Joint Force Explosive Ordnance Disposal Group & Afghan Heroes

== 2010 ==
The 2010 award ceremony was televised on ITV, on 20 December 2010. The ceremony was presented by Amanda Holden and Phillip Schofield.

Award	Recipient(s)
Overcoming Adversity	Corporal Andy Reid, 3rd Battalion, Yorkshire Regiment
Most Outstanding Sailor or Marine	Sergeant Major Buck Ryan, 40 Commando
Most Outstanding Soldier	Warrant Officer II Karl Ley, 11 Explosive Ordnance Disposal Regiment RLC
Most Outstanding Airman	Flight Lieutenant Ian Fortune, No. 27 Squadron RAF
Best Reservist	Squadron Leader Sarah Charter
Support to the Armed Forces	Denny Wise
Life Saver Award	Corporal Ricky Fergusson, 4th Battalion, The Rifles
True Grit	Sergeant Keith Best, RAF Search and Rescue Force
Best Unit	1st Battalion, The Mercian Regiment
Judges' Awards for Special Recognition	Heroes of Sangin; RAF Bomber Command

== 2011 ==
The 2011 award ceremony took place at the Imperial War Museum on 19 December 2011 and was televised on ITV, on 21 December 2011, at 8.30pm. It was hosted by Amanda Holden and Phillip Schofield.

The winners were:

Award	Recipient(s)
Overcoming Adversity	Private Scott Meenagh, 2nd Battalion, Parachute Regiment
Most Outstanding Sailor or Marine	Petty Officer Aircrewman Mike Henson, HMS St Albans
Most Outstanding Soldier	Sergeant Ryan McReady, 1st Battalion, Royal Irish Regiment
Most Outstanding Airman	Flight Lieutenant Michael Anderson, RAF Odiham
Best Reservist	Air Engineering Technician Michelle Ping, Royal Naval Reserve Air Branch
Support to the Armed Forces	Walking with the Wounded
Life Saver Award	RAF Tactical Medical Wing
True Grit	Private Lee Stephens, 3rd Battalion, The Mercian Regiment
Best Unit	42 Commando Royal Marines
Judges' Special Award	HMS Liverpool
Judges' Special Award	RAF Search and Rescue

== 2012 ==
The 2012 award ceremony was again held at the Imperial War Museum on 6 December 2012 and was televised on ITV, on 15 December 2012 at 9pm and were hosted by Amanda Holden and Phillip Schofield.

Award	Recipient(s)
Overcoming Adversity	Captain Si Maxwell, Royal Marines
Most Outstanding Sailor or Marine	Corporal Justin Morgan, Royal Marines, 771 Naval Air Squadron
Most Outstanding Soldier	Lance Corporal Sean Jones, 1st Battalion, Princess of Wales's Royal Regiment
Most Outstanding Airman	Sergeant Roy Geddes, No. 51 Squadron RAF Regiment
Best Reservist	Private Simon Sunderland, Royal Logistic Corps
Support to the Armed Forces	Nikki Scott, founder "Scotty's Little Soldiers"
Life Saver Award	Lance Corporal Hayley Ridgeway, 1st Battalion, The Rifles
True Grit	Corporal Oliver Kennedy, 1st Battalion, Princess of Wales's Royal Regiment
Best Unit	3rd Battalion, The Rifles
Judges' Special Award	Complex Trauma Team, Defence Medical Rehabilitation Centre, Headley Court
Judges' Special Award	Operation Olympics (military contribution to 2012 London Olympic Games)

== 2013 ==
The 2013 award ceremony took place at the National Maritime Museum on 11 December and was televised on ITV on 16 December from 9pm. The ceremony was once again hosted by Amanda Holden and Phillip Schofield.

Award	Recipient(s)
Overcoming Adversity	Corporal Josh Boggi, Royal Engineers
Most Outstanding Sailor or Marine	Petty Officer (Naval Nurse) Emily McCullough, Queen Alexandra's Royal Naval Nursing Service
Most Outstanding Soldier	Rifleman Josh Dodds, B Company, 4th Battalion, The Rifles
Most Outstanding Airman	Sergeant Anna Irwin, 18 (Bomber) Squadron RAF
Best Reservist	Lance Corporal Keith Mallon, Royal Yeomanry
Support to the Armed Forces	Families' Activity Breaks charity
Life Saver Award	Sergeant Rachael Robinson, 22 Squadron, RAF Search and Rescue Force
Best Unit	904 Expeditionary Air Wing, Tornado Detachment
Judges' Awards for Special Recognition	Veterans of the Battle of the Atlantic. Camp Bastion's Support to Operations personnel

== 2014 ==
The 2014 award ceremony took place at the National Maritime Museum on in December and was televised on ITV on 18 December from 8.30pm. The ceremony was hosted by Amanda Holden and Phillip Schofield.

Four specially created awards marked the end of combat operations in Afghanistan, with the recipients chosen from previous winners of awards.

Award	Recipient(s)
The Fire-fight	42 Commando Royal Marines
The Bomb Hunters	Warrant Officer II Karl Ley, 11 Explosive Ordnance Disposal Regiment RLC
The Life Savers	Flight Lieutenant Ian Fortune, No. 27 Squadron RAF; Air Engineering Technician Michelle Ping, Royal Naval Reserve Air Branch
Brothers in Arms	3rd Battalion, The Rifles
Support to the Armed Forces	My Daddy is a Soldier Adventures
Hero Abroad	HMS Illustrious
Home-Front Hero	Corporal Daniel Botterell, 36 Engineer Regiment
Judges' Awards for Special Recognition	Commonwealth War Graves Commission

== 2015 ==
The 2015 awards took place at Guildhall, London and were presented by Tom Bradby.

Award<	Recipient(s)
Most Outstanding Soldier	Major Andrew Todd, 2nd Battalion, Royal Gurkha Rifles
Best Reservist	Major Henry Dowlen, Royal Marines Reserves, London
Overcoming Adversity	Former Lance Corporal Dean Bousfield, Royal Army Medical Corps (Veteran)
Judges' Award for Special Recognition	The Royal Navy and Royal Air Force Search and Rescue Force
Support to the Armed Forces	Pilgrim Bandits
Most Outstanding Sailor or Marine	Petty Officer Seamen Specialist Luke Hallis, HMS Clyde
Judge's Award for Special Recognition	The Invictus Games Foundation
Most Outstanding Airmen	Sergeant Michael Beamish, 1564 Flight, 905 EAW.
Best Unit Award	HMS Bulwark

== 2016 ==
The 2016 awards were presented by Lorraine Kelly on 14 December. They were televised on Forces TV.

Award	Recipient(s)
Hero at Home Unit	11 Explosive Ordnance Disposal Regiment RLC
Judges' Special Recognition	2nd Battalion, the Duke of Lancaster's Regiment

== 2017 ==
The 2017 awards were presented by Lorraine Kelly for the second time. The event took place on 13 December and were televised on Forces TV.

Award	Recipient(s)
Hero at Home - Individual	Lieutenant Jared Bambridge, 1st Battalion the Yorkshire Regiment, Army
Best Reservist	Corporal Phillip Keogh, 335 Medical Evacuation Regiment, Army
Hero at Home - Unit	Southern Diving Unit 2, Royal Navy
Overcoming Adversity	Former Senior Aircraftman Luke Wigman, RAF Regiment, RAF and former Captain Ibi Ali, The Yorkshire Regiment, Army
Hero Overseas – Individual	Leading Seaman Sally Hughes, HMS Dragon, Royal Navy
Hero Overseas – Unit	UK Reaper Squadron, RAF
Inspiring Others	SPEAR 17, Army
Innovation Award	Warrant Officer Paul Moonan, Royal Navy
Judges’ Award for Special Recognition	Operation Ruman
Support to the Armed Forces	Veterans with Dogs

== 2018 ==
The 2018 awards were presented by Lorraine Kelly for the third time. The event took place on 13 December and were televised on Forces TV.

Award	Recipient(s)
Hero at Home - Individual	Cdr Andrew Parkinson, Commanding Officer Navy Combined Cadet Force
Best Reservist	Cpl Isabell Hutchinson, 299 Parachute Squadron, Royal Engineers
Hero at Home - Unit	Joint Chemical, Biological, Radiological and Nuclear Task Force
Hero Overseas – Individual	LCpl Chris May, LCpl Dean Priestley, Tpr Stuart Finlay, Tpr Ross Woodward, Tpr James Astbury, Tpr Zak Davidson
Hero Overseas – Unit	HMS Daring
Inspiring Others	Major Scotty Mills, Royal Marines
Innovation Award	Defence Science and Technology Laboratory – Sepsis research
Support to the Armed Forces	There But Not There

== 2019 ==
The 2019 awards were presented by Lorraine Kelly for the fourth time. The event was televised on Forces TV.

Award	Recipient(s)
Judges Special Award	Royal British Legion and D-Day veterans
Hero at Home - Individual	Lance Corporal Craig Daniel
Best Reservist	Lieutenant Commander Tracey MacSephney
Hero at Home - Unit	18 and 27 Squadron, RAF Odiham
Hero Overseas – Individual	Flight Lieutenant Aaron Kerry
Hero Overseas – Unit	HMS Argyll
Inspiring Others	Private Fin Doherty
Innovation Award	Scar Free Foundation
Supporting the Armed Forces	All Call Signs
Overcoming Adversity	Rifleman Craig Monaghan
