= Give a Pet a Home =

- Genre: Factual
- Presented by: Amanda Holden
- Country of origin: United Kingdom
- Original language: English
- No. of series: 1
- No. of episodes: 6

Production
- Executive producer: Mirella Breda
- Producers: Gerard Williams (series producer); Jason Campion; Laura Woolf
- Running time: 60 minutes (inc. adverts)
- Production company: Initial

Original release
- Network: ITV
- Release: 15 April – 20 May 2015

Related
- Paul O'Grady: For the Love of Dogs

Give a Pet a Home is a factual British television show that was presented by Amanda Holden. The series aired for six episodes from 15 April until 20 May 2015.

== Format ==
The six-part series was filmed at an RSPCA animal centre in Birmingham. The show featured celebrities who, each week aimed to find a pet a new home.

The series was fronted by Amanda Holden. She said: "I'm so delighted to be hosting this new series that will look into the amazing work the RSPCA do and hopefully we'll be able to find some much needed new homes for the pets featured on the show. I am just going to have to stop myself from taking them all home with me!"

== Celebrities ==
On 20 March 2015, the full celebrity line-up for Give a Pet a Home was revealed as:

- Chris Kamara
- Coleen Nolan
- Denise Lewis
- Julian Clary
- Kimberly Wyatt
- Peter Andre

== Ratings ==
Official viewing figures are from BARB.

Episode	Original air date	Viewers (millions)	ITV weekly rank
1	15 April 2015	2.50	20
2	22 April 2015	2.25	21
3	29 April 2015	2.25	25
4	6 May 2015	1.87	30
5	13 May 2015	2.01	27
6	20 May 2015	1.88	27
