= Swanmore College =

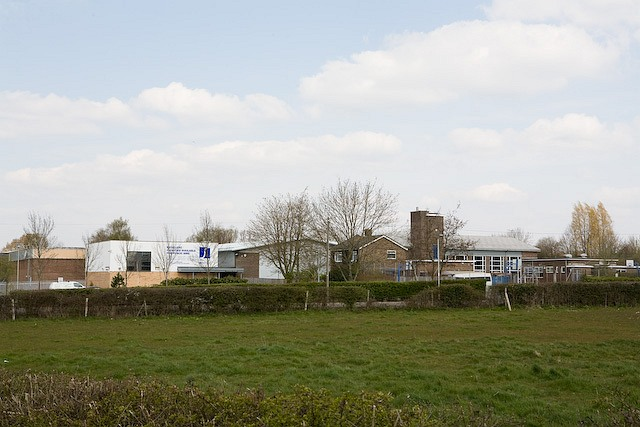

Location
- New Road; Swanmore, Hampshire, SO32 2RB; England; 50.9403°N 1.1900°W

Information
- Former name: Swanmore College of Technology
- Type: Community school
- Motto: Together We Thrive
- Religious affiliation: Non-religious
- Local authority: Hampshire County Council
- Department for Education URN: 116424 Tables
- Ofsted: Reports
- Head teacher: Kyle Jonathan
- Gender: Mixed
- Age range: 11–16
- Enrolment: 1,212 (2018)
- Capacity: 1,350
- Houses: Whittle; Hawking; Attenborough; MacArthur
- Colours: Royal blue and black
- Website: www.swanmore-school.co.uk

Swanmore College is an 11–16 mixed secondary community school in Swanmore, Hampshire, England. The school has achieved Sports-mark, Investors in People and an Enhanced Healthy School award.

== History ==
A secondary school was first built in Swanmore in 1961, becoming a comprehensive school in 1971. During the early 2000s Swanmore School was renamed Swanmore College of Technology after receiving specialist status in technology. In September 2012, the new headmaster Russell Jonathan brought a new slogan to the college, 'Centre of Excellence'.

== Facilities ==
Swanmore College has several sports fields, including an international standard football STP and a gym, used by students in PE lessons and after-school clubs, and also by the community. In 2018, the college spent £3.3 million on a new dance and performing arts studio, including retractable seats and a sprung floor, a renovation of 'W block' (primarily used for computing and technology) and a new recording studio in 'E Block' (used for music).

The college has nine blocks (each correlating to a letter in 'S W A N M O R E', with a 9th being a Performance building), each containing different subjects. These blocks include four computer suites, ten science classrooms, many technology rooms, and three art rooms, with one consisting mainly of Apple iMacs for photography work. Swanmore also uses iMacs in the two music rooms; these are for the use of both KS3 and GCSE pupils, particularly the use of the programs GarageBand and Logic Pro X.

Swanmore's facilities are open to booking from the community.

== Alumni ==
- Amanda Holden attended the college in the 1980s. In 2018, she returned to open a £2 million arts facility.
