= Glasgow's Needy =

- Type: Charity organisation

Glasgow's Needy is a non-registered charity organisation based in Glasgow, Scotland, with the aims of collecting and providing food to the cities poor. Glasgow's Needy was founded in September 2014 by father and son duo, Andy and Darren Carnegie. The founders of Glasgow’s Needy embarked on the project after seeing so much deprivation and poverty, which they claim to be "sickening". Glasgow’s Needy also campaign for social justice and equality, however say their main focus is supplying food to the poor people of Glasgow.

== Protests ==
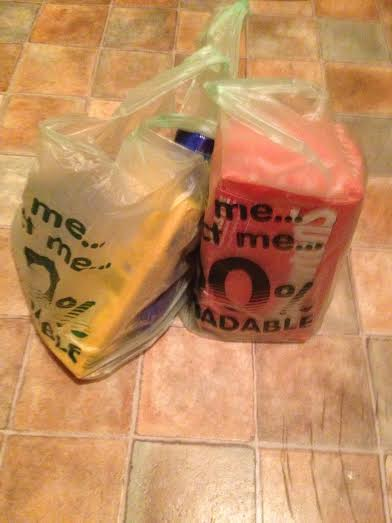
An example of a donation given to Glasgow's Needy.

The Founders embarked on a protest against poverty. They did this by eating only one meal a day, and only slept in a bag and tent for a week. They did this in order to raise awareness of poverty in Glasgow. In October 2014 Glasgow's Needy founders appeared on STV news as they made public plea for toy donations. This was extremely successful due to the fact that thousands of people took part, bringing with them various forms of donations. Perhaps the best part would be that they received nearly £50,000 worth of donations. They did this in a number of weeks during October 2014. Glasgow’s Needy visited Rothesay on Sunday 2 November, they took with them donations for the island foodbanks. Whilst they were there they explained how the organisation came about and how it operates. As of 10 November 2014, Glasgow’s Needy opened up their first hub located in Milton, at the Colston Milton Church north of (Glasgow) city. The organizers say that this is one of many hubs to be opened, as they have aspirations of opening many more.

=== Labour's gala dinner ===
On 30 October 2014 Glasgow Needy organisation were part of the protest against the Labour Party's expensive gala dinner, while Glasgow's vulnerable have to get their food from food banks. In order to express their feelings they planned to organize a silent protest in which they gathered food donations and left them opposite the main entrance of the Grand Central Hotel (Glasgow). This was purposely done so that Labour's party supporters attending the event would have to walk past these food collections while they go to their two-hundred per head dinner. This was done to show the Labour attendees to feel guilty but also to show the contrast between Glasgow and Labour's priorities. However, the organizers of this event officially cancelled it due to it gaining too much momentum and worrying possibility of the event growing out of control and not being a silent protest anymore. It unofficially still happened as Glasgow Needy used this to get their point of view across to the Labour politicians.

== Allegations for investigation ==
Glasgow Needy have been accused of collecting food and not offering it to Glasgow's poor, this has been said because they refuse to collaborate with longer established food banks. There is also concern from other food banks because Glasgow Needy is a non-registered charity. Darren and Andrew Carnegie have been described as being aggressive and intimidating by some critics, which has alarmed other anti-poverty campaigners. After Glasgow's Needy was set up, Julie Webster, the coordinator of the greater Maryhill food bank has suggested that donations have dipped.
