= Lorraine Kelly =

Scottish presenter and journalist (born 1959)

Honorary Colonel Lorraine Kelly CBE
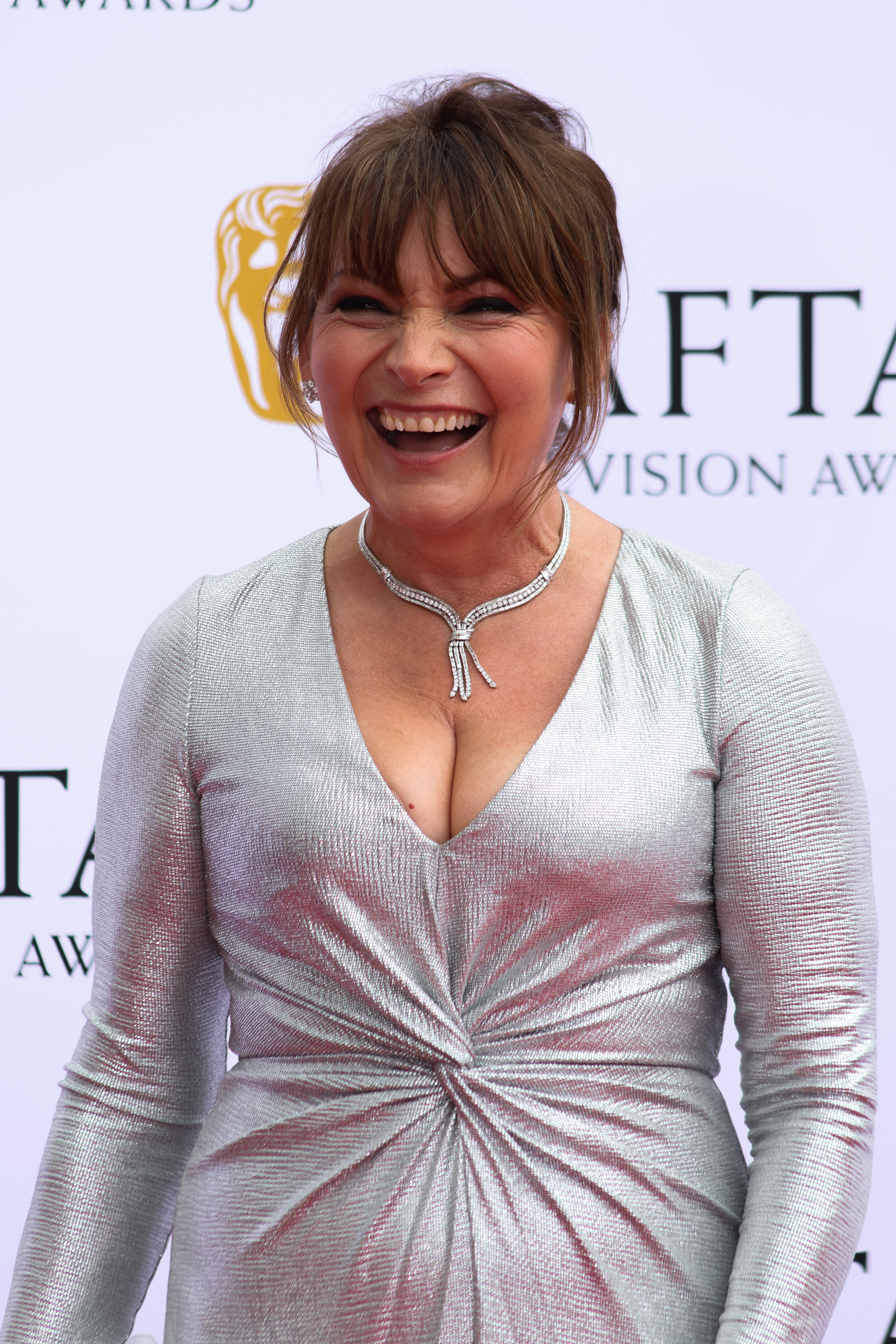
- Kelly in 2026
- Born: 30 November 1959 (age 66); Glasgow, Scotland
- Occupations: Television presenter; journalist
- Years active: 1983–present
- Employers: ITV; STV
- Spouse: Steve Smith (m. 1992)
- Children: 1

Lorraine Kelly (born 30 November 1959) is a Scottish television presenter. She has presented various television shows for ITV and STV, including Good Morning Britain (1988–1992), GMTV (1993–2010), This Morning (2003–2005, 2016), Daybreak (2012–2014), The Sun Military Awards (2016–present), STV Children's Appeal (2016–present), and her eponymous programme Lorraine (2010–present).

Between 2004 and 2007, Kelly was Rector of the University of Dundee. She was appointed Officer of the Order of the British Empire (OBE) in the 2012 New Year Honours for services to charity and was promoted to Commander of the Order of the British Empire (CBE) in the 2020 Birthday Honours for services to broadcasting, journalism and charity.

== Early life ==
Lorraine Kelly was born on 30 November 1959 at Glasgow Royal Maternity Hospital and lived in the Gorbals area until she was two. She has Irish ancestry. The Kellys originally came from Draperstown in Northern Ireland and went to Scotland in the 18th century looking for work. Her father, John, worked as a television repairman. She has one brother, born six years later. Kelly moved to Bridgeton, Glasgow, at the age of two, where she attended Strathclyde Primary and John Street Secondary School. She moved to East Kilbride when she was 13, where she attended Claremont High School. She turned down a university place to study English and Russian in favour of a job on the East Kilbride News, her local newspaper and then joined BBC Scotland as a researcher in 1983. She moved to TV-am as an on-screen reporter covering Scottish news in 1984.

== Career ==
=== 1984–1993: TV-am and Good Morning Britain ===
In early October 1984, Kelly joined TV-am as Scotland Correspondent. On the back of her coverage of the Pan Am Flight 103 disaster in Lockerbie, in July 1989, Kelly presented TV-am's Summer Sunday programme with chief reporter Geoff Meade.

Throughout the rest of 1989, Kelly provided cover for the presenters on the main weekday programme. On 31 January 1990, she became a main presenter of Good Morning Britain alongside Mike Morris.

=== 1993–2010: GMTV and Talk Radio ===
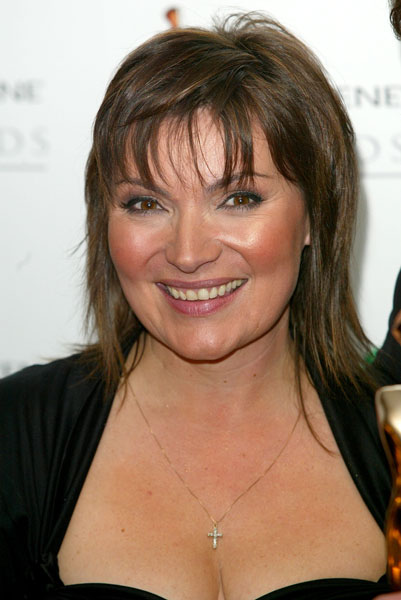
Kelly attending an event in June 2007

In January 1993, Kelly helped launch GMTV by presenting a range of programmes. Her first job was presenting the new Top of the Morning. In March, when Fiona Armstrong walked out of the main GMTV show, Kelly moved to the main breakfast show with Eamonn Holmes. In June 1994, Kelly went on maternity leave, but shortly afterwards she was sacked from the main presenting roles, she returned in November 1994 to do a mother and baby slot. This led to her becoming the presenter of Nine O'Clock Live. The show proved so popular that it was moved to the earlier 08:35 slot, retitled Lorraine Live.

Kelly also had a stint in radio, with her own daily programme broadcast on air by then new British phenomenon of Talk Radio (precursor of TalkSport) around 1997–99. In Autumn 2000, as GMTV rebranded to GMTV Today, Kelly's show changed its name to LK Today. As part of the later rebrand that took place in 2009, the show again changed its title to GMTV with Lorraine, to coincide with GMTV Today changing back to GMTV. Lorraine moved for the first time into the main GMTV studio, instead of Kelly having her own part of the studio to host from. In April 2010, to make GMTV's programming more consistent, GMTV with Lorraine began airing all year round, instead of breaking during school holidays, with guest presenters.

According to the Sunday Mirror, in 2007, Kelly was prevented from appearing in an advertising campaign for Asda as GMTV managing director Clive Crouch felt that such a move would create more bad publicity for GMTV, which had recently been fined £2 million by broadcasting regulator Ofcom for its misuse of premium-rate phone lines. On 9 July 2010, as well as the announcement that GMTV had been axed to make way for Daybreak, it was also revealed that Kelly's new programme Lorraine would replace GMTV with Lorraine. On 15 July 2010, Kelly presented her last show before leaving.

=== 2010–present: Lorraine and Daybreak ===
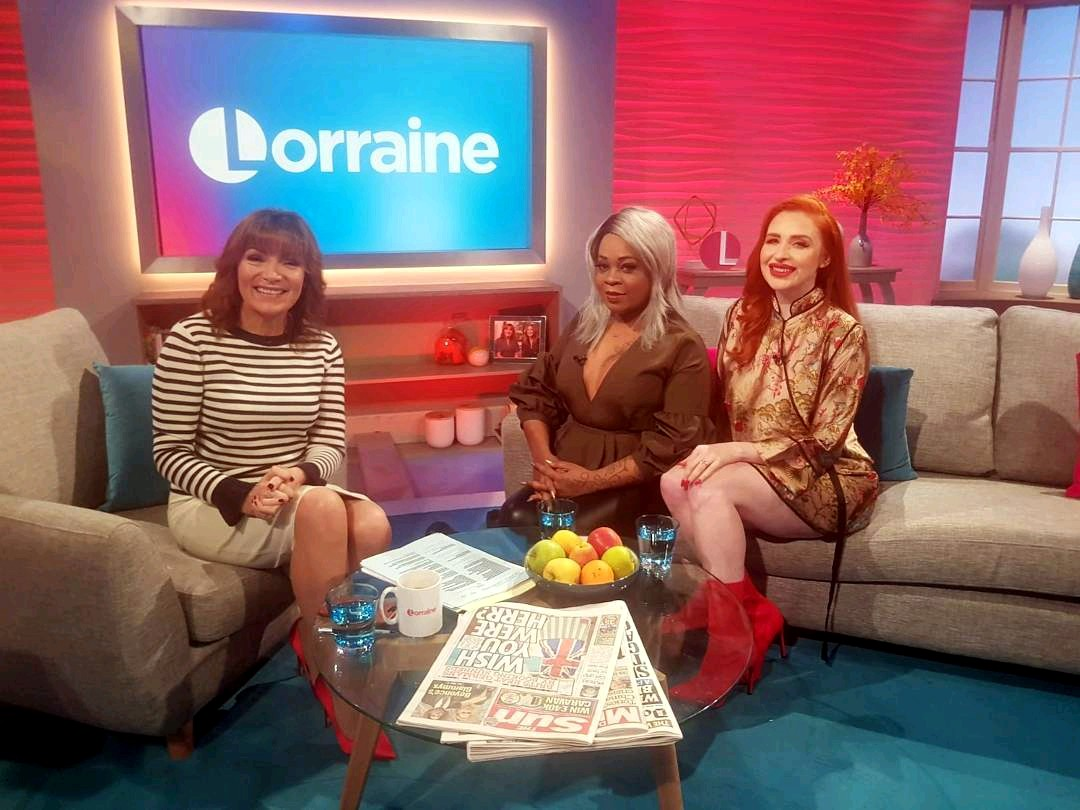
Kelly (left) with guests on the set of Lorraine in 2018

On 6 September 2010, GMTV ended with ITV Breakfast taking over. Lorraine launched with a brand new look, alongside Daybreak. In 2011, Kelly presented the ITV series Children's Hospital, and was a guest presenter on the BBC Two series Never Mind the Buzzcocks in series 25. She provides voice-over and narration on the CBeebies show Raa Raa the Noisy Lion.

On 4 May 2012, it was confirmed that Kelly would take over from Christine Bleakley as presenter on Lorraine's sister programme Daybreak. She debuted on 3 September 2012. She co-hosted the programme with Aled Jones from Monday to Thursday, with Kate Garraway co-hosting on Fridays.

In February 2014, Kelly announced that she would leave Daybreak to focus on Lorraine which she began hosting five days a week from 28 April 2014. Daybreak was replaced by Good Morning Britain in April 2014. Lorraine would occasionally report for GMB whenever her show wasn't aired. In 2024, Kelly faced significant criticism on social media for her frequent absences on Lorraine and the show's perceived overreliance on relief presenters Christine Lampard and Ranvir Singh. An account on X, tracking her attendance of her own show, has gained more than 10,000 followers. In 2014, Kelly made a cameo appearance in an episode of Birds of a Feather. On 19 September 2014, Kelly reported from Dundee on Good Morning Britain on the Scottish independence result. On 13 April 2016, Kelly guest presented an episode of This Morning with Rylan Clark-Neal.

Kelly presented a four-part series for Channel 5 called Penguin A&E with Lorraine Kelly. The series began airing on 10 May 2016. In 2018, Kelly co-presented Wedding Day Winners with Rob Beckett. The show aired on Saturday nights on BBC One. In May 2019, she made a cameo in Coronation Street. During the COVID-19 pandemic, she hosted her programme in the Good Morning Britain studio. "Good Morning Britain with Lorraine" had a more news-focused style to it, yet still featured interviews with celebrities, Hollywood updates from Ross King, and medical advice on the pandemic with Dr Hilary Jones. She returned to the Lorraine studio on 13 July.

=== Other television work ===
==== 2005–present: STV ====
Kelly hosted the annual Glenfiddich Spirit of Scotland Awards in 2005 and 2006 for STV.

Since 2011, Kelly has hosted STV's Children's Appeal annually with Sean Batty, she also hosts STV Appeal Stories on the channel and her 2016 Show Lorraine & Friends. Kelly hosted the Lorraine Kelly's Hogmanay in 2016, welcoming viewers into the New Year from HM Frigate Unicorn in Dundee in a pre-recorded show. In 2019, she presented the gameshow The Cash Machine. Lorraine made two appearances of the STV Glasgow talk show The Riverside Show and one appearance on the late-night talk show The Late Show with Ewen Cameron which runs across all STV channels.

==== Other television roles ====
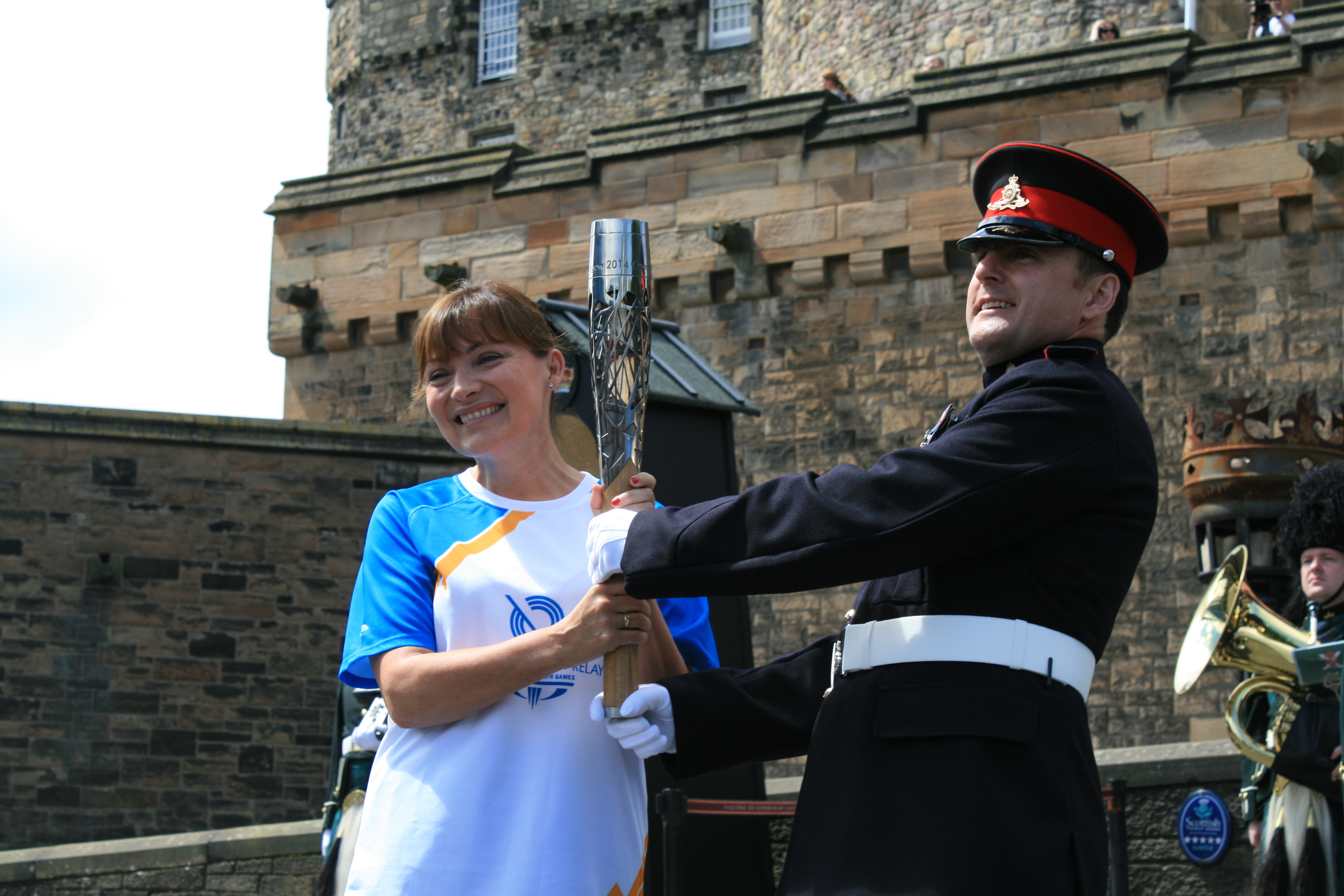
Kelly (left) carrying the Queen's Baton during the Queen's Baton Relay prior to the start of the 2014 Commonwealth Games

During 1994–1995, Kelly also presented Carlton magazine programme After 5. She appeared on Lily Savage's Blankety Blank in 2001. Kelly presented Liquid News, the spin-off Liquid Eurovision and became the national spokeswoman for the United Kingdom during the collation of votes at the Eurovision Song Contest, in both 2003 and 2004.

She was parodied by Dawn French in the TV sitcom Absolutely Fabulous as a stereotypical daytime TV news reporter for series 1 in 1992; this role was reprised for the film in 2016. She has made several appearances on Have I Got News for You including as guest presenter. From 2004, Kelly co-presented This Morning with Phillip Schofield, on Mondays and Fridays, to allow Fern Britton to spend more time with her family, but she left in March 2006.

Kelly guest hosted an episode of The Friday Night Project on Channel 4. She also guest hosted The New Paul O'Grady Show and returned three other times from 2006 to 2008, owing to sheer popularity. Kelly also hosted the annual Glenfiddich Spirit of Scotland Awards in 2005 and 2006 for STV. In 2006, Kelly filmed an ITV documentary programme Secrets Revealed – DNA Stories, made by STV Productions, and broadcast on Sky Real Lives. A second series was shown on the channel in 2008.

In 2010, Kelly filmed a six-part documentary series Lorraine Kelly's Big Fat Challenge shown on Bio. The series featured Kelly and a team of experts putting 'Britain's fattest family', the Chawner family, through their paces to lose weight and transform their lives. Daughter Emma Chawner is best known for her unsuccessful appearances on The X Factor. Also in 2010, in conjunction with the Missing People charity, Sky and STV produced a new documentary series hosted by Kelly, about missing mothers. This series followed the success of Sky's previous successful missing person series Missing Children: Lorraine Kelly Investigates.

Kelly has also made acting appearances in the Scottish sitcom Still Game and the soap opera River City. In 2021, Kelly interviewed Gurdeep Pandher. In 2024, Kelly appeared on the fifth series of The Masked Singer. She was unmasked as "Owl" in the fifth episode, and later appeared a guest panellist in the seventh episode.

=== Writing ===
Kelly writes weekly columns for The Sun and The Sunday Post. She was announced as the first Agony Aunt for the Royal Air Force's fortnightly RAF News on 7 October 2009.

== Charity work ==
Kelly is a celebrity patron of Worldwide Cancer Research.

Kelly is also a patron of the Human Rights advocacy, information and advice charity POhWER. About being a patron, Kelly commented: 'I am proud to be a Patron of POhWER, a charity which helps people to find their voice, make their case, get the care and support they need and see wrongs put right'. Kelly is also a patron of the British charity Help for Heroes. Kelly is an Honorary Patron of The Courtyard, Herefordshire's Centre for the Arts.

In 2011, Kelly was among the celebrities to take part in the BT Red Nose Desert Trek which took place in the Kaisut Desert for Comic Relief and raised £1,375,037. She has been an ambassador and presenter for STV Children's Appeal since its creation in 2011. Kelly also became an ambassador for the charity Sightsavers in 2011.

== Awards and honours ==
In April 1991, Kelly was awarded the TRIC Diamond Jubilee Award for New Talent of the Year. In 2004, she was elected as the first female rector of the University of Dundee, being formally installed to office on 28 April 2004. She held this position until 2007. On 20 June 2008, she was awarded an honorary Doctor of Laws from the university, for her services to charity. On 28 June 2018, she was awarded the honorary degree of Doctor of Arts from Edinburgh Napier University.

Kelly was appointed Officer of the Order of the British Empire (OBE) in the 2012 New Year Honours for services to charity and the armed forces and was promoted to Commander of the Order of the British Empire (CBE) in the 2020 Birthday Honours for services to broadcasting, journalism and charity.

On 16 November 2014, Kelly received a special Scottish BAFTA award honouring her 30-year television career. In 2024, Kelly received a special BAFTA award.

Kelly has been described by Attitude as "one of Britain's cult gay icons". In 2015, she was given the "Honourary [sic] Gay Award" at the 2015 Attitude Awards for her support for the LGBT community.

Since June 2009, she has been an Honorary Colonel in the Black Watch battalion Army Cadet Force. Since November 2019, she has been National Honorary Colonel of the Army Cadet Force.

=== Commonwealth honours ===
Country	Date	Appointment	Post-nominal letters
United Kingdom	2012 – 2020	Officer of Order of the British Empire (Civil Division)	OBE
United Kingdom	2020 – present	Commander of Order of the British Empire (Civil Division)	CBE

=== Scholastic ===
Chancellor, visitor, governor, rector and fellowships

Location	Date	School	Position
Scotland	28 April 2004–26 September 2007	University of Dundee	Rector

=== Honorary degrees ===
Location	Date	School	Degree	Gave Commencement Address
Scotland	20 June 2008	University of Dundee	Doctor of Laws (LL.D.)	
Scotland	28 June 2018	Edinburgh Napier University	Doctor of Arts (D.Arts)	

=== Honorary military appointments ===
Military Branch	Date	Regiment	Position
(United Kingdom) British Army	June 2009 – present	Black Watch Battalion of the Army Cadet Force	Honorary Colonel
(United Kingdom) British Army	29 November 2019 – present	Army Cadet Force	National Honorary Colonel

== Personal life ==
Between 1993 and 2005, Kelly lived in Cookham Dean, Berkshire, on the Thames west of London, with her husband, Stephen "Steve" Smith, a television cameraman, whom she married on 5 September 1992, at Mains Castle in Dundee. Between 2005 and 2010, she lived in Coupar Angus, Perthshire. Kelly previously lived in Broughty Ferry, Dundee and stayed in her flat in Westminster during the week, until she moved in December 2017. Kelly and her husband then decided to sell their Broughty Ferry home and moved to Bourne End, Buckinghamshire, to be closer to Lorraine's work and so they could spend more time together. Kelly has described herself as an 'adopted Dundonian' and despite moving away, she considers Dundee to be a place that she will always call home.

Kelly has one daughter, born on 8 June 1994, who teamed up with her mother on The Cube in December 2021, playing for MS Therapy Centre.

Kelly is an outspoken critic of Catholic schools in Scotland and has called for an end to them saying they were a cause of trouble in society and prolonged the "scandal of sectarianism".

Kelly has been a fan of the Scottish football team Dundee United since 1987, after being taken to a game by her now-husband. She was made an honorary patron of the club in 2018.

In 2018, Kelly spoke of her experiences with the menopause and encouraged other women to speak about it.

On 3 May 2025, Kelly revealed that she had undergone a salpingectomy and a bilateral oophorectomy as a preventative measure.

== Filmography ==
=== Television ===
Year	Title	Role	Channel
1984–1992	Good Morning Britain	Presenter	ITV
1993–2010	GMTV (GMTV with Lorraine)	Presenter	ITV
1995	After 5	Herself	
1995	The Street Party	Herself	
2000	Live Talk	Panellist	ITV
2000	One Foot in the Grave	Herself	BBC One
2000	Never Can Say Goodbye: The Sheena Easton Story	Narrator	BBC One
2001	A Question of TV	Team Captain	BBC One
2002	Ruby	Herself	BBC One
2002	Faking It	Herself	Channel 4
2003	The Bill	Herself	ITV
2003–2004	Eurovision Song Contest	Spokesperson for United Kingdom	BBC One
2003–2005, 2016	This Morning	Presenter	ITV
2004	Eurovision: Making Your Mind Up	Herself – Jury Member	BBC One
2006	River City	Herself	BBC Scotland
2007	Still Game	Herself	BBC Two
2010	Celebrity Pressure Cooker	Presenter	ITV
2010–2011	Children's Hospital	Presenter	ITV
2010—	Lorraine	Presenter	ITV
2011–2012	Raa Raa the Noisy Lion	Narrator	CBeebies
2011—	STV Children's Appeal	Presenter	STV
2012–2014	Daybreak	Presenter	ITV
2014–2015	Hogmanay Party	Presenter	STV
2014—	Good Morning Britain	Occasional reporter	ITV
2016–2017	Penguin A&E with Lorraine Kelly	Presenter	Channel 5
2016	Lorraine & Friends	Presenter	STV
2016	Lorraine Kelly's Hogmanay	Presenter	STV
2016–	The Sun Military Awards	Presenter	Forces TV
2017	Carnage	Herself (cameo role)	BBC iPlayer
2018	Wedding Day Winners	Co-presenter	BBC One
2019	Coronation Street	Herself/Presenter	ITV
2019	The Cash Machine	Herself/Presenter	STV
2019	RuPaul's Drag Race UK	Special guest Series 1, Episode 4: "Snatch Game"	BBC Three
2020	Good Morning Britain with Lorraine	Presenter	ITV
2020	The Last Leg	Stand-in Presenter	Channel 4
2021	RuPaul's Drag Race UK	Guest Judge; Series 2, Episode 4: "Morning Glory"	BBC Three
2021	Return To Dunblane With Lorraine Kelly	Herself/Presenter	ITV
2022	Queens for the Night	Host	ITV
2023	Return To Lockerbie With Lorraine Kelly	Herself/Presenter	ITV
2024	The Masked Singer	Contestant ("Owl"); Guest panellist	ITV
2026	Lorraine Kelly's Norwegian Odyssey	Presenter	Channel 4

Guest appearances

- Cluedo (1992)
- Surprise Surprise (1993–1995)
- The Mrs. Merton Show (1995)
- Shooting Stars (1997)
- Timmy Towers (1997)
- An Audience with the Spice Girls (1997)
- Harry Hill (1998)
- Late Lunch (1999)
- It's Only TV ... But I Like It (1999)
- Lily Savage's Blankety Blank (2001)
- The Weakest Link: Celebrity Special (2001)
- Who Wants to Be a Millionaire? (2003)
- The Xtra Factor (2006)
- Alan Carr's Celebrity Ding Dong (2008)
- The Marriage Ref (2011)
- The Real Housewives of New York City (2012)
- Piers Morgan's Life Stories (2013)
- Birds of a Feather (2014)
- Tipping Point: Lucky Stars (2014)
- The Jonathan Ross Show (2014)
- Mel and Sue (2015)
- Harry Hill's Alien Fun Capsule (2017)
- Murder in Successville (2017)
- Catchphrase: Celebrity Special (2017)
- The Cube (with daughter Rosie) (2021)
- The One Show (2023), (2024)
- Mary Makes It Easy (2023)
- Ant & Dec's Saturday Night Takeaway (2024)
- Late Night Lycett (2024)

=== Film ===
Year	Title	Role
2014	Pudsey: The Movie	Cat (voice)
2023	Dfi Dudu and the Countdown	Narrator (voice)

== Bibliography ==
- Lorraine Kelly's Nutrition Made Easy (Virgin Books, due January 2009)
- Lorraine Kelly's Junk-Free Children's Eating Plan (Virgin Books, 2007)
- Lorraine Kelly's Baby and Toddler Eating Plan (Virgin Books, 2002/2004/2006)
- Lorraine Kelly's Scotland (released 13 March 2014)
- The Island Swimmer (released 15 February 2024)
- The Island Secret (released 18 June 2026)

Academic offices
Preceded by Fred MacAulay	Rector of the University of Dundee; 2004–2007	Succeeded by Craig Murray
