= Jeans for Genes =

Fundraising event held in Australia and the United Kingdom

- Established: 1991

Jeans for Genes Day is a national fundraiser held in Australia and the United Kingdom. The two fundraisers are not associated with one another and raise money for different organisations.

== Jeans for Genes (Australia) ==
In Australia, Jeans for Genes was founded by the Children's Medical Research Institute (CMRI) in 1994.

== Jeans for Genes (United Kingdom) ==
In the United Kingdom, The CGD Research Trust and Support Group was founded as a charity in 1991 by New Zealander, Ocean Numan, (Paul), with the aim of finding a cure for Chronic Granulomatous Disease (CGD) for his son and other CGD boys through gene therapy. This relatively new form of treatment still remains the greatest creator of hope that inherited diseases will be finally conquered. One of the Trust's dedicated supporters, Rosemarie Rymer, came up with the original idea of wearing jeans, for the benefit of your genes, one day in the year, and paying a gold coin donation to the national appeal. The first UK Jeans for Genes campaign was run in 1992 when the CGD Trust mailed 20,000 UK schools. The appeal raised close to 50,000 pounds. In the second year of running the appeal (1994) the campaign raised a further 55,000 pounds. As a small charity the Trust considered whether working cooperatively with Great Ormond Street Children's Hospital and two other bigger immunodeficiency charities would help achieve greater revenue. In 1997 the partnership appeal raised 800,000 pounds, and the following year 2.7 million pounds. The UK annual appeal continues today and is run by Genetic Disorders UK. It is unrelated to the Australian appeal, though in the spirit of co-operation both charities have in the past shared their experience of running a successful national appeal. Today the CGD Research Trust is known as The CGD Society.

Genetic disorders affect 1 in 25 people born in the UK and include conditions such as cystic fibrosis, sickle cell anaemia and muscular dystrophy. Their associated health problems mean that genetic disorders are the biggest cause of death of children aged 14 years.

Jeans for Genes Day takes place each September when people across the UK make a small donation to wear their jeans to work and to school. Supporters are able to register for a free fund-raising pack through Genetic Disorders UK.

The money raised is distributed through the Jeans for Genes Grant Programme. Funding from Jeans for Genes was key in the development of gene therapy at the UCL and the Institute of Child Health at Great Ormond Street Hospital in London. The Appeal has now raised in excess of 40 million pounds.

The charity also aims to raise awareness and understanding of genetics and what it means to live with a genetic disorder. It provides educational materials for schools through a dedicated website called Genes Are Us

== See also ==
- Genetic epidemiology
- List of genetic disorders
- Medical genetics
