= List of BBC radio stations =

This is a list of national, regional and local radio stations owned by the BBC in the United Kingdom.

== List of national radio stations ==
All stations are available via BBC Sounds and online platforms.

Logo	Name	Format	AM kHz	FM MHz	DAB	Freeview Freesat	Sky	Virgin Media
	BBC Radio 1	Youth-orientated music	—	97.1–99.7	12B	700	0101	901
	BBC Radio 1 Anthems	Nostalgic and classic popular music	—	—	12B	—	—	—
	BBC Radio 1 Dance	Electronic dance music	—	—	12B	—	—	—
	BBC Radio 1Xtra	Black contemporary music	—	—	12B	701	0127	907
	BBC Radio 2	Adult-orientated music	—	88.1–90.2	12B	702	0102	902
	BBC Radio 3	Classical, jazz and world music and culture	—	90.2–92.6	12B	703	0103	903
	BBC Radio 3 Unwind	Classical and meditation music	—	—	12B	—	—	—
	BBC Radio 4	Spoken-word programming	—	92.5–96.1; 103.5–104.9	12B	704	0104	904
	BBC Radio 4 Extra	Archive programming	—	—	12B	708	0126	910
	BBC Radio 5 Live	News, current affairs, discussion and sport	MW; 693; 909; 990 (Wales)	—	12B	705	0105	905
	BBC Radio 5 Live	News, current affairs, discussion and sport	Also on BBC Local Radio, BBC Radio Scotland, BBC Radio Wales and BBC Radio Ulster overnight					
	BBC Radio 5 Sports Extra	Additional sports coverage	—	—	12B	706	0131	908
	BBC Radio 6 Music	Alternative music	—	—	12B	707	0120	909
	BBC Radio 6 Indie Forever	Indie music	—	—	—	—	—	—
	BBC Asian Network	Station for the British Asian community	MW; 828; 837; 1449; 1458	—	12B	709	0109	912
	BBC World Service	International radio station for news and current affairs	—	—	12B	710 711	0115	906
	BBC World Service	International radio station for news and current affairs	Also on BBC Radio 4 and BBC Radio Cymru overnight Available worldwide on various other platforms					

== List of regional radio stations ==
Channels numbers below are valid within the relevant region. Outside each region, channel numbers may differ, or may not be available, dependent on platform.

=== Scotland ===
BBC Scotland
Logo	Name	Description	AM kHz	FM MHz	DAB	Freeview Freesat	Sky	Virgin Media
	BBC Radio Scotland	National radio station for Scotland (Note: An AM opt out station exists as BBC Radio Scotland Extra, which is also available on BBC Sounds.)	MW; 810	92.5–94.7	11B; 11C; 12D	719 712	0116	930
	BBC Radio nan Gàidheal	Scottish Gaelic language radio station	—	103.5–105	11B; 11C; 11D	720 713	0129	934
	BBC Radio Orkney	Part-time radio station for Orkney which opts out of Radio Scotland	—	93.7	—	—	—	—
	BBC Radio Shetland	Part-time radio station for Shetland which opts out of Radio Scotland	—	92.7	—	—	—	—

=== Wales ===
BBC Cymru Wales
Logo	Name	Description	AM kHz	FM MHz	DAB	Freeview Freesat	Sky	Virgin Media
	BBC Radio Wales	National radio station for Wales (Note: An AM opt out station exists as BBC Radio Wales Extra, which is also available on BBC Sounds.)	MW; 882	90.2–92.3; 93.9–96.1; 103.9	10D; 12A; 12D	719 714	0117	931
	BBC Radio Cymru	Welsh language radio station	—	92.4–96.8; 103.5–104.9	10D; 12A; 12D	720 715	0135	936
	BBC Radio Cymru 2	Part-time Welsh language radio station which opts out from Radio Cymru	—	—	10D; 12A; 12D	721 735	0136	913

=== Northern Ireland ===
BBC Northern Ireland
Logo	Name	Description	AM kHz	FM MHz	DAB	Freeview Freesat	Sky	Virgin Media
	BBC Radio Ulster	National radio station for Northern Ireland	—	92–95	12D	719 716	0118	932
	BBC Radio Foyle	Part-time radio station for County Londonderry which opts out of Radio Ulster	—	93.1	12D	720 717	0135	933

== List of BBC Local Radio stations in England ==
=== East ===
BBC East
Logo	Name	Broadcast area	Studios	MW kHz	FM MHz	DAB	Freeview
	BBC Radio Cambridgeshire	Cambridgeshire	Cambridge	—	95.7; 96.0	11C; 12D	722
	BBC Essex	Essex	Chelmsford	—	95.3; 103.5	12D	734
	BBC Radio Norfolk	Norfolk	Norwich	873 (until the end of November 2026)	95.1; 95.6; 104.4	10B; 9C(+)	719
	BBC Radio Northampton	Northamptonshire	Northampton	—	103.6; 104.2	10C	734
	BBC Radio Suffolk	Suffolk	Ipswich	—	95.5; 95.9; 103.9; 104.6	10C	720
	BBC Three Counties Radio	Bedfordshire; Hertfordshire; Buckinghamshire	Dunstable	—	90.4; 92.1; 94.7; 95.5; 98.0; 103.8; 104.5	10D	720

=== East Midlands ===
BBC East Midlands
Logo	Name	Broadcast area	Studios	MW kHz	FM MHz	DAB	Freeview
	BBC Radio Derby	Derbyshire; East Staffordshire	Derby	1116 (until the end of November 2026)	104.5; 95.3; 96.0	10B	735
	BBC Radio Leicester	Leicestershire; Rutland	Leicester	—	104.9	11B	721
	BBC Radio Nottingham	Nottinghamshire	Nottingham	—	103.8; 95.5; 95.1	12C	720

=== London ===
BBC London
Logo	Name	Broadcast area	Studios	MW kHz	FM MHz	DAB	Freeview Freesat	Sky	Virgin Media
	BBC Radio London	Greater London	London	—	94.9	12A	713 718	0135	937

=== North East & Cumbria ===
BBC North East and Cumbria
Logo	Name	Broadcast area	Studios	MW kHz	FM MHz	DAB	Freeview
	BBC Radio Cumbria	Cumbria	Carlisle	756; 837 (until the end of November 2026)	95.6; 96.1; 95.2; 104.1; 104.2	11B	721
	BBC Radio Newcastle	Tyne and Wear; Northumberland; Northern County Durham	Newcastle upon Tyne	—	95.4; 96.0; 103.7; 104.4	11C	719
	BBC Radio Tees	Northern North Yorkshire; Southern County Durham	Middlesbrough	—	95.0; 95.8	11B	722

=== North West ===
BBC North West
Logo	Name	Broadcast area	Studios	MW kHz	FM MHz	DAB	Freeview
	BBC Radio Lancashire	Lancashire	Blackburn	—	95.5; 103.9; 104.5	12A	720
	BBC Radio Manchester	Greater Manchester; Northeastern Cheshire; Northwestern Derbyshire	Salford	—	95.1; 104.6	12C	719
	BBC Radio Merseyside	Merseyside; Northwestern Cheshire; West Lancashire	Liverpool	—	95.8	10C	722

=== South ===
BBC South
Logo	Name	Broadcast area	Studios	MW kHz	FM MHz	DAB	Freeview
	BBC Radio Berkshire	Berkshire; Northern Hampshire; Parts of Buckinghamshire; Parts of southern Oxfordshire	Reading	—	104.1; 104.4; 95.4; 94.6	12D	719
	BBC Radio Oxford	Oxfordshire	Oxford	—	95.2	10B	722
	BBC Radio Solent	Hampshire; Isle of Wight; Eastern Dorset	Southampton	—	96.1	11C	722
	BBC Radio Solent	Central and western Dorset (opt-out)	Dorchester	—	103.8	11B	726

=== South East ===
BBC South East
Logo	Name	Broadcast area	Studios	MW kHz	FM MHz	DAB	Freeview
	BBC Radio Kent	Kent	Royal Tunbridge Wells	—	96.7; 97.6; 104.2	11C	719
	BBC Radio Surrey	Surrey; Northeastern Hampshire; Northern West Sussex	Guildford	—	104.0; 104.6	10C	722
	BBC Radio Sussex	East Sussex; West Sussex	Brighton	—	95.0; 95.1; 95.3; 104.5; 104.8	10B	720

=== South West ===
BBC South West
Logo	Name	Broadcast area	Studios	MW kHz	FM MHz	DAB	Freeview
	BBC Radio Cornwall	Cornwall	Truro	—	95.2; 96.0; 103.9	11B	721
	BBC Radio Devon	Devon	Plymouth	—	103.4; 94.8; 95.7; 95.8; 96.0; 104.3	11C; 10C; 12D	720
	BBC Radio Guernsey	Bailiwick of Guernsey	St Sampson; St Peter Port	—	93.2; 99.0	12A(+)	721
	BBC Radio Jersey	Jersey	Saint Helier	—	88.8	12A(+)	719
	BBC Radio Somerset	Somerset	Taunton	1566 (until the end of November 2026)	95.5	10B	722

=== West ===
BBC West
Logo	Name	Broadcast area	Studios	MW kHz	FM MHz	DAB	Freeview
	BBC Radio Bristol	Bath; Bristol; South Gloucestershire; North Somerset; North East Somerset	Bath; Bristol	—	94.9; 104.6; 103.6	11B	719
	BBC Radio Gloucestershire	Gloucestershire	Gloucester	1413 (until the end of November 2026)	104.7; 95.0; 95.8	10C	735
	BBC Radio Wiltshire	Wiltshire	Swindon	—	103.6; 103.5; 104.3; 104.9	10D; 11C	721

=== West Midlands ===
BBC West Midlands
Logo	Name	Broadcast area	Studios	MW kHz	FM MHz	DAB	Freeview
	BBC CWR	Coventry; Warwickshire	Coventry	—	94.8; 103.7; 104.0	12D	719
	BBC Hereford & Worcester	Herefordshire; Kings Norton; Worcestershire	Worcester	—	94.7; 104.0; 104.4; 104.6	12A	720
	BBC Radio Shropshire	Shropshire	Shrewsbury	—	96.0; 95.0; 90.0; 104.1	11B	721
	BBC Radio Stoke	Northern and mid-Staffordshire; Southern Cheshire	Stoke-on-Trent	—	94.6; 104.1	12D	726
	BBC Radio WM	Birmingham; The Black Country; Solihull; Southern Staffordshire	Birmingham	—	95.6	11B; 11C	722

=== Yorkshire ===
BBC Yorkshire
Logo	Name	Broadcast area	Studios	MW kHz	FM MHz	DAB	Freeview
	BBC Radio Leeds	West Yorkshire	Leeds	—	92.4; 95.3; 102.7; 103.9	12D; 11B	719
	BBC Radio Sheffield	South Yorkshire; Northern Derbyshire	Sheffield	—	104.1; 88.6; 94.7	11C	734
	BBC Radio York	North Yorkshire	York	—	95.5; 103.7; 104.3	10C	720

=== Yorkshire & Lincolnshire ===
BBC Yorkshire and Lincolnshire
Logo	Name	Broadcast area	Studios	MW kHz	FM MHz	DAB	Freeview
	BBC Radio Humberside	East Riding of Yorkshire; Northern Lincolnshire	Hull	—	95.9	10D	721
	BBC Radio Lincolnshire	Lincolnshire	Lincoln	—	94.9; 104.7	12A	722

== See also ==
- BBC Local Radio
- List of radio stations in the United Kingdom
- List of Internet radio stations
