= Annie Mac (radio show) =

Radio show on BBC Radio 1

- Other names: Radio 1’s Future Sounds with Annie Mac; Radio 1's Dance Party with Annie Mac
- Genre: Music, chat, Entertainment and Live Music Sessions
- Running time: 120 minutes (6pm – 8pm, Monday – Friday)
- Country of origin: United Kingdom
- Language: English
- Home station: BBC Radio 1
- Hosted by: Annie Mac
- Produced by: Matt Fincham
- Recording studio: Studio 82A, Broadcasting House, London.
- Original release: 29 July 2004 – 30 July 2021
- Audio format: Stereophonic sound
- Website: https://www.bbc.co.uk

Annie Mac is a BBC Radio 1 radio show featuring Annie Mac, and focusing on Music, chat and Live Music Sessions, broadcasting from 2004 to 2021.

On 15 February 2015, it was announced that Mac would replace Zane Lowe's as the presenter of Radio 1's evening show (airing Monday to Thursdays from 7:00 to 9:00 pm), which she took over on 9 March 2015.

DJs including Huw Stephens, Phil Taggart and MistaJam have hosted the show in her absence.

== Show format ==
Max showcased the best new music from around the world.

- Hottest Record – The Hottest Record is played at 6:00pm each night accompanied by an interview with the band/artist (either in the studio or on the phone). It is played twice and then is also repeated on Clara Amfo
- New Names – Each night at 7:00pm Annie showcases a new and exciting band or artist in a slot designed to shine a light on emerging talent.
- The Power Down Playlist – Every Monday from 7:00, Annie plays mellow and downtempo music to ease people into the week.
- Live Gig – Every Tuesday night, Annie has a live gig from an artist or band she's been championing.
- The Party Playlist – Every Thursday night Annie welcomes a guest on the show to pick their all-time favourite party tracks.
- The Exchange – Each month Annie invites three music lovers (usually artists) to come on the show to talk about the most important issues in music that week. This feature is filmed for the iPlayer.

== Annie Mac's show and career ==
Information from the Annie Mac Wikipedia Page

Annie Mac's first BBC Radio 1 show was broadcast on 29 July 2004. Although she had been a producer at BBC Radio 1 before this and was heard as a voice for jingles on the station at least as far back as February 2004.

Her first ever live set at the Station was at BBC Radio 1's Big Weekend in Dundee in May 2006 as part of the Essential Mix live broadcast. Annie remarked on air at the time how it was the first time they had trusted her to do a live mix.

Annie currently hosts a number of shows on BBC Radio 1. Her main show, called Annie Mac, airs from 7:00 pm to 10:00 pm on Friday nights. She also hosted BBC Switch with close friend and fellow DJ Nick Grimshaw on Sunday evenings from 7:00 pm to 10:00 pm until 21 March 2010. After this date they moved to 10:00pm - midnight with a new show simply called Nick Grimshaw and Annie Mac. She is currently one of only two presenters on the station to present shows in both the specialist and entertainment sector, the other being Huw Stephens.

A popular feature is the Annie Mac Mini Mix, an opportunity to showcase various DJs' ability to produce a five-minute mix with other DJs. The Mini mix was also a feature of her previous show on a Thursday night. As well as her own Friday show, Annie also covers for other BBC Radio 1 shows. She was a regular stand in for Zane Lowe's show. In 2009 Annie won the Best Female Award at the Drum and Bass Awards for her contribution to the promotion of this genre of music.

Annie makes regular appearances as a feature presenter on BBC Two's The Culture Show, giving her opinions on the latest music offerings. She appeared on Never Mind the Buzzcocks in January 2006 and she co-presented Top of the Pops on 18 June 2006 with Reggie Yates and on 11 July 2006 with Rufus Hound in a T in the Park special. Annie has also filled in for Zane Lowe on his Gonzo show on MTV2. She regularly DJs at clubs such as Fabric London, Moles Club in Bath, Digital in Brighton and university venues such as Fitzwilliam College, Cambridge and Aston University. She also recently appeared on ITV Comedy, FM, as herself.

Since Nick Grimshaw left his daily 10 til midnight weekday slot; Mac has been covering for the slot, later fellow BBC Radio 1 DJ Huw Stephens covered the slot and Mac returned to her usual Friday slot before the Pete Tong show.

She released "Annie Mac Presents 2012" in October 2012, the track listing contained some of the songs Mac played on the Channel 4 House Party. Tracks by Knife Party and Steve Aoki headlined the track listing.

On 31 December 2012, Mac was one of the DJs selected by Channel 4 to hold a live six-hour, televised New Year's House Party. Annie Mac dj'd into the New Year on this televised event.

From November 2014, she will be hosting "Annie Mac Presents" on SiriusXM's BPM in the United States, starting at 9 PM ET.

On 15 February 2015, it was announced she had taken over Zane Lowe's BBC Radio 1 weekday evening show airing Monday-Thursdays 7:00 - 9:00 pm.

In 2017, Annie Mac was nominated at the Electronic Music Awards for Radio Show of the Year for "Annie Mac Presents".

In 2020, it was announced that Radio 1 will be bringing a couple of schedule changes to the station on 1 September, meaning Annie Mac's Future Sounds and Dance Party will move to a brand new time slot of 6pm with the Hottest Record moving to the start time of the show. Rickie, Melvin and Charlie moved to 8pm and Jack Saunders moves to a brand new time slot at 10pm, with brand new Future Artists on Mondays-Wednesdays and Indie Show on Thursdays. This is part of the station’s renewed commitment to supporting new music and emerging artists.

On 20 April 2021, Mac announced that she would be leaving Radio 1 on 30 July of the same year, citing the need to spend more time with her husband Toddla T and their children. She made the emotional announcement live on air during Greg James' Radio 1 Breakfast Show. It was also announced that fellow Radio 1 DJ, Clara Amfo, would take over Annie's Future Sounds show (Mon-Thu 18:00-20:00) from July, while Danny Howard would take over Mac's Dance Party show (Fridays 18:00-20:00).

== See also ==
- Annie Mac
- BBC Radio 1
