= Meg Ward (DJ) =

British disc jockey and record producer

- Born: 1997 or 1998 (age 27–28)
- Origin: Pontefract
- Genres: house music, techno, disco, UK garage and hip-hop
- Occupations: Record producer, Disc Jockey
- Website: www.meg-ward.com

Meg Ward (born 1997 or 1998) is a British electronic dance music disc jockey and record producer from Pontefract, England. She is known for her live performances, with music that combines multiple genres including house, techno, disco and garage.

== Career ==
Ward grew up in West Yorkshire, and began her career as a disc jockey at age 18 when she was at university in 2016. She was nominated for a DJ Mag award in 2022 in the Breakthrough Producer category. She has been featured several times on BBC Radio, including the shows of Jaguar, Nemone, and Tom Ravenscroft.

Ward is known for her live club sets. She had a residency at the Newcastle upon Tyne club ILL Behaviour, and has played live at Glastonbury, Creamfields, Amnesia, Snowbombing, Parklife, and the Reading and Leeds Festival. In May 2022 she performed live from the DJ Mag headquarters. Her music has been characterised as "synth heavy sounds plus acid and house-infused garage" that is "filled with energy and love" and "intertwines multiple genres".

In 2024 Ward launched the Mega Wavy record label, with first released single "Keep U" by Ward herself.

== Discography ==
- "Have Ur Love"
- "Troubles"
- "Connections"
- "Phenol House" (2020)
- "Meditate" (2020)
- "Lookin 4 Fame" (2020)
- "Coral Diving (Meg Ward Remix)" (2020)
- "Last All Night" (2022)
- "Keep U" (2024)
- "69 Percent" (2025)
