= BBC Radio 1 Anthems =

British national radio station

- London, Salford and Glasgow; United Kingdom
- Frequency: DAB+: 12B (BBC National DAB)

Programming
- Language: English
- Format: Contemporary hit radio
- Network: BBC Radio

Ownership
- Owner: BBC
- Sister stations: BBC Radio 1; BBC Radio 1Xtra; BBC Radio 1 Dance

History
- First air date: 8 November 2024; 21 months ago

Links
- Website: https://www.bbc.co.uk/radio1anthems

BBC Radio 1 Anthems is a British digital radio station owned and operated by the BBC. The station launched on 8 November 2024 and plays a wide range of music and artists supported by the main Radio 1 network during the 2000s and 2010s. It is available both online via BBC Sounds and on DAB+ radio. The service acts as a non-commercial alternative to Capital Anthems, a Capital spin-off station launched on 12 September 2024.

== History and launch ==
From as early as 2019, the Radio 1 Anthems brand began appearing on the main Radio 1 network. This allowed the station to offer a variety of playlist-style shows on BBC Sounds, which was launched in 2018 and identified as a strategic priority by the BBC to expand the platform's audience.

The station rebranded its Radio 1's Greatest Hits show (Friday to Sunday, 10–11 am) as Radio 1 Anthems in July 2019. This brought it inline with existing anthems show, Radio 1's Dance Anthems, which had been part of the Friday and Saturday evening schedule in its current inception since 2012. Other playlist shows like Radio 1's Workout Mix were rebranded as Workout Anthems, the Friday edition of Radio 1's Dance Anthems was rebranded as Party Anthems, while Chillout Anthems launched in September 2019.

In November 2019, reports showed that the BBC was considering launching 'spin-off stations' of their popular music stations in order to gain more listeners. The first of these, Radio 1 Dance, launched on 9 October 2020 with Annie Mac, Danny Howard and Pete Tong hosting a 4-hour dance simulcast. Following this, the BBC launched Radio 1 Relax on BBC Sounds in April 2021. Radio 1 Relax closed on 24 July 2024.

Additional Radio 1 Anthems playlists including Pop Anthems, Festival Anthems, Ibiza Anthems, R&B Anthems and Rap Anthems launched on the network between 2020 and 2022.

=== Launch on BBC Sounds ===
In February 2024, the corporation announced plans to launch three new spin-offs, pending public consultation and regulatory approval: one from Radio 1 for "music from the 2000s and 2010s, catering to the appetite from young audiences for recent nostalgia"; one from Radio 2, with "a distinctive take on pop nostalgia' from the 50s, 60s and 70s"; and one from Radio 3 for "calming classical music". In addition, Radio 1 Dance would launch on DAB+ with expanded programming.

Following regulatory approval from Ofcom, the BBC announced in September 2024 that the Radio 1 strand would be Radio 1 Anthems and would launch on BBC Sounds from Friday 8 November 2024.

Aled Haydn Jones, Head of Radio 1, said: "Radio 1 Anthems is going to be a great nostalgic trip for our young audience, and to make it happen we're going to be giving some new opportunities to people from across the UK. Radio 1 plays a crucial role in developing new talent for the entire industry, and we can't wait to bring this new offer for our listeners to enjoy and discover."

=== Launch on DAB+ ===
On 2 July 2025, following a formal consultation process, plans to launch Radio 1 Anthems on DAB+ were approved by Ofcom.

The station subsequently launched without prior announcement on DAB+ in the United Kingdom on 9 September 2025, alongside Radio 1 Dance and Radio 3 Unwind.

The BBC formally confirmed the launch in a press release issued on 12 September 2025, describing it as a "significant milestone" in the broadcaster's radio portfolio. The statement noted that Radio 1 Anthems, Radio 1 Dance and Radio 3 Unwind were the first new BBC music radio services since the launch of 1Xtra, 6 Music and Asian Network in 2002. To accommodate the new services, the BBC National DAB multiplex was reconfigured, with several existing stations having their bitrates reduced.

Radio 1 Anthems was described by the BBC as a genre-led service showcasing "all-day anthems from the 2000s to now." The station focuses on music from artists and eras popularised by the main Radio 1 network during the early 21st century, with curated playlists themed around nostalgia, workouts, chillouts and party soundtracks. The press release also teased an "exciting announcement" on Radio 1 Breakfast with Greg James on 16 September 2025; this was for Radio 1 Anthems Live taking place 15 November 2025 at Bradford Live.

== Programming and Presenters ==
In 2021 the BBC said programming on the stream will be existing on-demand content from BBC Radio 1 and BBC Sounds. This includes Radio 1's Workout Anthems, Radio 1's Chillout Anthems, Radio 1's Pop Anthems(simulcast with Radio 1 on Thursdays at 3–3:30pm) Radio 1's Happy Anthems , Radio 1's Party Anthems (simulcast with Radio 1), Radio 1's Anthems Discovery, My Radio 1 Anthems , Radio 1 Anthems (in certain cases simulcast, such as on a Friday morning from 10-11am with Radio 1) Radio 1's 100 Greatest Anthems and also the extensive Radio 1 archive of Anthems themed programming. Curiously, however, Radio 1's Dance Anthems is not broadcast on this stream. Around the time of Radio 1's Big Weekend in Liverpool in 2025, a special set of programmes entitled Big Weekend Anthems, featuring the respective line ups for the three days mixed into a 30-minute themed mix for each day. Also, In March 2025, two episodes of a special programme Pace Setter Anthems (a combination of Workout Anthems and Pace Setter (a BBC Sounds exclusive show designed to aid running and workout)) were released to mark that year's Radio 1 challenge for Comic Relief, entitled Radio 1's Ultra Marathon Man: Jamie Laing. On 10 Feb 2025, A special 1 hour Valentine's Day themed programme entitled Radio 1's Love Anthems was broadcast and released onto Sounds. A special Valentine's episode of Pop Anthems was also released onto BBC Sounds. Presenters for the various programmes on the stream include Dean McCullough (Pop), Jess Iszatt (Chillout), Maia Beth (Happy) and Lauren Redfern (Anthems, Anthems Discovery, 100 Greatest Anthems).

Previously, weekly Anthems shows that are broadcast on Radio 1 were being simulcast but these ceased on 13 April 2025.

== See also ==
- BBC Radio 1 Dance
- BBC Radio 1 Relax
