= Electronic Music Awards =

American music award ceremony

The Electronic Music Awards was a music award show focused on electronic music genres that debuted on September 21, 2017, in Los Angeles. It was created by Paul Oakenfold and entertainment company Hunt & Crest and produced by L!ve Media. The show was live streamed via Twitter and Pluto TV and garnered 3.4 million views within 2.5 hours.

The 2017 event was hosted by Hannah Rad, Matt Medved, Robin Schulz, and Vicky Vox. Performers included Moby, Juan Atkins, Autograf, Floorplan, Illenium, Kidnap Kid, Orbital, Ramzoid, Delano Smith, Goldfish, Madeaux, and the Saunderson Brothers.

On May 8, 2018, it was announced that the ceremony would return on November 8. The 2018 show aimed to celebrate equality and excellence in electronic music, under the mission statement of "We're All the Same on the Dance Floor". Despite the announcement, no further shows materialised, and by 2022, the web domain had been parked.

== Winners and nominees ==
=== 2017 ===
The following table provides the list of nominees and winners according to The Hollywood Reporter and Electronic Music Awards:

Category	Nominees
Album of the Year	Bonobo – Migration
Album of the Year	Justice – Woman
Album of the Year	The Chainsmokers – Memories...Do Not Open
Album of the Year	Cashmere Cat – 9
Album of the Year	Gorillaz – Humanz
Single of the Year	Major Lazer ft. Justin Bieber & MØ – "Cold Water"
Single of the Year	Skrillex & Rick Ross – "Purple Lamborghini"
Single of the Year	DJ Snake ft. Justin Bieber – "Let Me Love You"
Single of the Year	Porter Robinson & Madeon – "Shelter"
Single of the Year	Martin Garrix & Dua Lipa – "Scared to Be Lonely"
Single of the Year	The Chainsmokers ft. Halsey – "Closer"
Record of the Year	Rüfüs Du Sol – "Innerbloom" (Sasha Remix)
Record of the Year	Kidnap Kid & Lane 8 – "ABA"
Record of the Year	Kolsch – "Grey"
Record of the Year	Todd Terje – "Jungle"
Record of the Year	Låpsley – "Operator" (DJ Koze Extended Disco Version)
Remix of the Year	Flume – "Say It" (Illenium Remix)
Remix of the Year	Portugal. The Man – "Feel It Still" (Medasin Remix)
Remix of the Year	Rüfüs Du Sol – "Innerbloom" (Sasha Remix)
Remix of the Year	Låpsley – "Operator" (DJ Koze Extended Disco Version)
Remix of the Year	Ed Sheeran – "Shape of You" (NOTD Remix)
Remix of the Year	Ed Sheeran – "Shape of You" (Major Lazer Remix ft. NYLA & Kranium)
Festival of the Year	Electric Daisy Carnival – Multiple Cities
Festival of the Year	Tomorrowland – Boom
Festival of the Year	Electric Forest Festival – Rothbury
Festival of the Year	Movement – Detroit
Festival of the Year	Lightning in a Bottle – Bradley
Producer of the Year	Cashmere Cat
Producer of the Year	Hot Since 82
Producer of the Year	Odesza
Producer of the Year	Sasha
Producer of the Year	The Chainsmokers
Club of the Year	Output – New York
Club of the Year	Berghain/Panorama Bar – Berlin
Club of the Year	DC-10 – Ibiza
Club of the Year	Elrow – Barcelona
Club of the Year	Fabric – London
Club of the Year	Omina – Las Vegas
Club of the Year	XOYO – London
Club of the Year	XS – Las Vegas
Radio Show of the Year	Tie: Diplo – Diplo & Friends / Pete Tong – The Essential Collection
Radio Show of the Year	Above & Beyond – Group Therapy
Radio Show of the Year	Annie Mac – Annie Mac Presents
Radio Show of the Year	Claude VonStroke – The Birdhouse
Radio Show of the Year	Danny Howard – BBC's Radio 1's Dance Anthems
Radio Show of the Year	Liquid Todd – Beta BPM
Radio Show of the Year	Nicole Moudaber – In the Mood
Radio Show of the Year	Pasquale Rotella – Nightowl Radio
New Artist of the Year	Alison Wonderland
New Artist of the Year	Kungs
New Artist of the Year	Marshmello
New Artist of the Year	Mura Masa
New Artist of the Year	Rezz
New Artist of the Year	San Holo
DJ of the Year	Eric Prydz
DJ of the Year	A-Trak
DJ of the Year	The Black Madonna
DJ of the Year	Claude VonStroke
DJ of the Year	Diplo
Live Act of the Year	Rüfüs Du Sol
Live Act of the Year	Bob Moses
Live Act of the Year	Bonobo
Live Act of the Year	Eric Prydz
Live Act of the Year	Flume
Live Act of the Year	Porter Robinson X Madeon
