= Richard Francis =

Richard Francis may refer to:

- Richard Francis (cricketer), English cricketer
- Richard Powell Francis (1860–1894), first Australian to graduate from Balliol College, died after rescuing others in the 1893 Brisbane flood
- Dick Francis (Richard Stanley Francis, 1920–2010), British crime writer and jockey
- Richard Francis (broadcaster) (Sir Richard Trevor Langford Francis, 1934–1992), British broadcaster
