= BBC Radio 1 Dance =

British national radio station

- Logo used since 2022
- London and Belfast; United Kingdom
- Broadcast area: United Kingdom
- Frequency: DAB+: 12B (BBC National DAB)

Programming
- Language: English
- Format: Dance and electronic music (incl. DJ mixes and live performances)
- Network: BBC Radio

Ownership
- Owner: BBC
- Sister stations: BBC Radio 1 BBC Radio 1Xtra; BBC Radio 1 Anthems

History
- First air date: 9 October 2020; 6 years ago

Technical information
- Licensing authority: Ofcom

Links
- Website: Radio 1 Dance via BBC Sounds

BBC Radio 1 Dance is a British digital radio station owned and operated by the BBC. It specialises in a wide range of dance and electronic music, featuring a mix of presenter-led programmes, curated DJ sets and live or pre-recorded performances.

The station was launched in October 2020 as a spin-off from Radio 1 exclusively on BBC Sounds. From September 2025, the station began broadcasting on DAB+. Some shows are simulcast on Radio 1 during late-night slots or events. Such shows from Radio 1 are also occasionally re-broadcast on Radio 1 Dance independently.

== History ==
Previous BBC Radio 1 Dance logo

Dance and electronic music has a long history on BBC Radio, beginning in the late 1980s and early 1990s, coinciding with the rise of dance culture and the rave scene in the UK.

BBC Radio 1 under then-controller Matthew Bannister played a pivotal role in bringing these genres to a wider, mainstream audience. Its shows, such as Pete Tong's Essential Selection which launched in 1991, have shaped UK club culture, providing a valued platform for DJs and producers.

Many significant figures in the dance scene have had shows on Radio 1, including Judge Jules, Annie Nightingale, Dave Pearce, and Danny Rampling. Radio 1 also broadcasts many live electronic shows and performances, including from music festivals such as Creamfields and Glastonbury, events such as The Warehouse Project, and Ibizan clubs. BBC Radio 1Xtra was launched in 2002 as a dedicated platform for contemporary black music, often featuring dance genres such as drum and bass, UK garage, grime, and dubstep.

=== Launch on BBC Sounds ===
From as early as November 2019, reports showed that the BBC was considering launching 'spin-off stations' of their popular music stations, including a dedicated dance stream. Jonathan Wall, controller of BBC Sounds, confirmed in February 2020 that Radio 1 Dance was to launch in spring 2020, but this was later delayed due to reduced broadcast schedules at the start of the COVID-19 pandemic.

Radio 1 Dance launched exclusively on BBC Sounds on 9 October 2020 with Annie Mac, Danny Howard and Pete Tong hosting a 4-hour dance marathon from 6 pm, simulcast on Radio 1. The station was initially a 24-hour radio stream, with all programming made up of archive or repeat content, or simulcasts from Radio 1.

The launch was met with criticism from commercial bodies. Andy Carter, chair of the All-party parliamentary group on Commercial Radio, said: "new services like Radio 1 Dance do not appear to meet the important public value tests that the BBC must observe." In late September 2020, following complaints from commercial bodies, Ofcom reviewed Radio 1 Dance, saying "we do not require the BBC to conduct a Public Interest Test [...] because we consider the impact of the Radio 1 Dance stream on the market is likely to be small, particularly given it will be online only and will contain no new or exclusive content."

In 2021, commercial radio body Radiocentre challenged Ofcom’s decision not to require a Public Interest Test (PIT) before the launch of Radio 1 Dance. Radiocentre argued that Ofcom had acted unlawfully by failing to assess the impact of the new BBC service on the wider radio market. The case was heard in the High Court in 2023. In July of that year, the court ruled in favour of Ofcom, stating that its decision had been lawful and rational, and that it had properly considered the relevant statutory duties before concluding that the impact of Radio 1 Dance was likely to be minimal, especially as it was online-only.

In April 2021, the BBC launched another music stream on BBC Sounds, Radio 1 Relax which closed on 24 July 2024.

=== Expansion ===
In February 2024, the BBC announced plans to expand the Radio 1 Dance stream, including a launch on the corporation's existing DAB+ spectrum.

Subject to regulatory approval, including a Public Interest Test (PIT), the stream would be upgraded to a full-time station and no longer remain online-only. The expanded station would feature newly commissioned programming, with a minimum of 45% of music from UK artists and at least a third of daytime music from new artists. Radio 1 Dance would also increase its coverage of live events and provide a platform for emerging DJs.

On 15 July 2024, an expanded schedule was introduced ahead of a launch on DAB+. The new line-up included a weekday morning show hosted by Arielle Free and a daily playlist programme presented by Connor Coates, broadcast from Belfast. These additions marked the first exclusive daytime shows for the stream. In its July 2024 review, Ofcom confirmed that the schedule changes to the Radio 1 Dance stream were not considered material under the BBC Charter, allowing the corporation to proceed without conducting a Public Interest Test.

On 2 July 2025, following a formal consultation process the plans to launch on DAB+ were approved by Ofcom.

=== Launch on DAB+ ===
Following Ofcom's approval, Radio 1 Dance launched without prior announcement on DAB+ in the United Kingdom on 9 September 2025, alongside Radio 1 Anthems and Radio 3 Unwind.

The BBC formally confirmed the launch in a press release issued on 12 September 2025, marking what it described as a "significant milestone" in its radio history. The statement noted that Radio 1 Dance, Radio 1 Anthems and Radio 3 Unwind were the first music networks to be added to the BBC's radio portfolio since the launch of 1Xtra, 6 Music and Asian Network in 2002. To accommodate the new services, the BBC National DAB multiplex was reconfigured, resulting in reduced bitrates for several existing stations.

Radio 1 Dance was described by the corporation as "24/7 dance music from the world’s biggest DJs", providing a genre-led service focused on electronic music, house, techno and drum and bass. To celebrate the launch, the station began a week of special programming on 15 September 2025, featuring a mix of classic and exclusive DJ sets, including an exclusive Essential Mix from Carl Cox recorded live at [UNVRS] in Ibiza, a replay of the Radio 1 Ibiza Prom from 2015, and sets from Eric Prydz, Disclosure and Peggy Gou.

Alongside the press release on 12 September 2025, Radio 1 Dance launched an official Instagram account, debuting with a shared post in collaboration with BBC Radio 1. The reel featured a loading bar animation beneath the station's logo, accompanied by the caption: "15.09.25... 🚀". The post drew supportive comments from several BBC presenters, including Danny Howard, Sarah Story, Charlie Hedges and Connor Coates.

== Programming ==
At launch in October 2020, Radio 1 Dance primarily featured repeated dance music programming from the main BBC Radio 1 schedule. This included one-hour playlist shows originally broadcast as part of Radio 1 Early Breakfast, which were then repeated across the week to form the majority of the daytime output. Regular hosts during this period included Adele Roberts, Arielle Free and Connor Coates.

The schedule also drew on presenters from Radio 1's Friday Early Breakfast initiative, in which emerging radio DJs at the start of their broadcasting careers are given month-long stints on the Friday edition of the show. These presenters subsequently contributed to Radio 1 Dance. During its early years, the overall schedule remained largely unchanged, aside from adjustments to Friday night simulcasts, which were revised following the departure of Annie Mac in July 2021.

In June 2024, the corporation announced a significant schedule refresh for Radio 1 Dance, introducing new and exclusive programmes to the stream from 15 July 2024. This also ended the repeated playlist shows from Radio 1 Early Breakfast. These changes were made in anticipation of the station's expansion beyond online streaming, ahead of its eventual launch on DAB+ in September 2025.

A further schedule change was announced in 2026, introducing new daytime programmes and changes to the station's specialist evening output.

=== Monday to Friday Daytime ===
Matty Chiabi presents the Radio 1 Dance playlist from 6 am to 9 am, produced by BBC Audio in Belfast. Arielle Free follows with the flagship Radio 1 Dance Morning show from 9 am to 12 pm. From midday, Charlie Tee presents the Radio 1 Dance afternoon playlist, produced by We Are Grape in Birmingham. The Belfast and Birmingham productions form part of the BBC's Across the UK strategy to increase programme production outside London.

From 3 pm, Radio 1 Dance Party Starters airs for an hour. This show is also hosted by Charlie Tee six days a week (Saturday to Thursday), while the Friday edition is hosted by Sam MacGregor and Danni Diston, and simulcast with the main Radio 1 network. In the drivetime slot, Radio 1's Dance Anthems, a flagship dance programme on the network featuring classic dance music in the mix, airs for two hours at 4 pm with Charlie Hedges.

=== Monday to Wednesday Evening ===
Monday to Wednesday, the evening show (6–8 pm) is a repeat of Pete Tong's Friday night programme. This is followed by Radio 1's Classic Essential Mix from 8 pm, a replay of two-hour mixes from the Radio 1 Dance archive. A two-hour industry partnership programme airs from 10 pm with current partnerships including Defected Records, HE.SHE.THEY. and DnB Allstars.

From midnight, The Residency on Radio 1 Dance airs on Mondays, Pete Tong's Essential History of Dance on Tuesdays and Radio 1's Essential Mix on Wednesdays.

=== Thursday Evening ===
Danny Howard presents Radio 1's Dance Party Warm-Up from 6 pm to 8 pm, followed by Radio 1's Classic Essential Mix from 8 pm to 10 pm. At 10 pm, Anjunadeep on Radio 1 Dance, an industry partnership programme with Anjunadeep, airs for two hours.

The Residency on Radio 1 Dance follows from midnight to 2 am, featuring a monthly rotating lineup of resident DJs. The programme is also broadcast on main Radio 1 network from 11 pm on Thursday nights, with the Radio 1 Dance transmission time-shifted by one hour.

=== Friday Evening ===
Friday night dance programming from BBC Radio 1 is simulcast on Radio 1 Dance from 6 pm. This comprises Radio 1's Dance Party with Danny Howard from 6 pm to 8 pm, Radio 1's Future Dance with Sarah Story from 8 pm to 10 pm and Pete Tong from 10 pm to midnight.

Radio 1's Essential Mix airs from midnight to 2 am, followed by Danny Howard's Club Mix from 2 am to 3 am. From 3 am to 5 am, Radio 1 Dance broadcasts its industry partnership programmes, typically comprising Defected on Radio 1 Dance, HE.SHE.THEY. on Radio 1 Dance, DnB Allstars on Radio 1 Dance and Anjunadeep on Radio 1 Dance across successive weeks of the month.

=== Saturday ===
On Saturdays, the station broadcasts its daytime programmes from Arielle Free, Matty Chiabi and Charlie Tee before Radio 1's Dance Anthems with Charlie Hedges from 4 pm to 7 pm, simulcast with BBC Radio 1. This is followed by Pete Tong's Essential History of Dance from 7 pm to 9 pm and Radio 1's Essential Mix from 9 pm to 11 pm. Charlie Tee also presents Radio 1's Drum & Bass Show from 11 pm – 12 am; this is followed by Radio 1 Dance Drum & Bass Mix (12–1 am) and Radio 1's Classic Essential Mix (1-3 am).

=== Sunday ===
The station broadcasts a similar schedule to Saturdays, including an exclusive three-hour edition of Radio 1's Dance Anthems with Charlie Hedges from 4 pm. Pete Tong's Essential History of Dance airs from 7 pm, while this is followed by BBC Introducing on Radio 1 Dance with Jaguar (9-11 pm).

From 11 pm, Martha presents a three-hour specialist programme produced by We Are Grape. The programme features a monthly focus on a selected club, exploring its music and club culture.

== Flagship shows ==
=== Radio 1's Dance Party ===
Broadcast on Thursday and Friday evenings from 6 pm, the Dance Party is a two-hour programme hosted by Danny Howard, who took over the Friday slot from long-serving DJ Annie Mac in 2021. The programme showcases new and popular British electronic music, with the Friday show simulcast on the main Radio 1 network as well as Radio 1 Dance. Show features include:

- Radio 1's Hottest Record - The Hottest Record is a daily feature on BBC Radio 1 that showcases a brand new track chosen as the "hottest" song of the day. The feature was introduced in 2002 and has become a popular way for the station to highlight exciting new music, with Friday's record from the dance genre.
- The Radio 1 Mini Mix - The Mini Mix is a five-minute mix from a different guest DJ or producer which typically features a selection of their favourite tracks and remixes mixed together in a creative and dynamic way.
- Battle of The Bangers - This feature welcomes DJs and music producers to go against the show's host, Howard, playing a selection of records each, with the audience voting for their favourite through text messaging.
- Club Mix - The Club Mix is an hour mix from Howard, sometimes themed depending on the time of year. Previous themes have included the Summer Feels Club Mixes and Feel Good Club Mixes.

From July 2024, it was announced that Danny Howard would host Radio 1's Dance Party Warm-Up on Thursday evenings exclusively on Radio 1 Dance.

=== Radio 1's Dance Anthems ===
Dance Anthems is mix show that plays a selection of classic, remixed and contemporary dance tracks. First introduced by Dave Pearce in October 1997, the Dance Anthems brand has been a regular part of the main Radio 1 schedule. The show took a brief hiatus from October 2008 before being relaunched in May 2012 by Danny Howard and Greg James. Howard hosted the slot for five years until November 2017 when MistaJam took over the programme.

Charlie Hedges took over hosting duties from MistaJam in September 2020.

It was announced that from Summer 2024, the show would be hosted every weekday by Hedges on Radio 1 Dance from 3pm to 6pm. This is in addition to the usual on Saturday afternoon shows from 4pm to 7pm, simulcast on the main Radio 1 network.

=== Pete Tong ===
Pete Tong's Global Dance HQ is a long-running programme on the main Radio 1 network, first broadcast in 1991. Currently two-hours in length, the show features new and cutting-edge electronic music from around the world. A regular feature of the show is Tong's designation of one track as the Essential New Tune of the week. This is a significant accolade within the dance music community.

From Summer 2024, Tong began hosting a new weekly show (Essential History of Dance) dedicated to telling the story of the Dance genre, airing on Saturdays from 7 pm to 11 pm.

=== Radio 1's Future Dance ===
Supporting grassroots DJs and music producers, Future Dance with Sarah Story is a two-hour programme broadcast from 8 pm on a Friday night. The show was introduced in 2021 as part of the station's commitment to supporting emerging talent in the dance music scene. Features include the Future Dance Track ID (selected by Story), the Peak Time Mix and the Future Dance Mix.

=== The Residency on Radio 1 Dance ===
Providing established and emerging DJs with access to a prime late-night slot, The Residency on Radio 1 Dance is a two-hour programme broadcast from 11 pm on Thursday nights on both Radio 1 and Radio 1 Dance. The show offers rotating month-long residencies, allowing artists to curate four consecutive weekly programmes and showcase their musical influences, new material and club-focused selections.

Originally launched in April 2012 as Radio 1's Residency for the late-night Radio 1 schedule, the programme has featured residencies from a wide range of internationally recognised and rising DJs across electronic and dance music genres. Based on the In New DJs We Trust show from the early 2010s, each residency typically runs for four weeks, with occasional one-off editions hosted by guest artists. The format is designed to give DJs extended creative control in a prominent broadcast slot, distinguishing it from shorter guest mixes or standalone appearances.

In September 2025, following Ofcom’s approval of Radio 1 Dance as a full-time DAB+ service, the programme was rebranded as The Residency on Radio 1 Dance, reflecting its central role within the station's specialist output.

The programme has featured residencies from artists including Amelie Lens, Andy C, The Blessed Madonna, Carl Cox, Charlotte de Witte, Disclosure, Eats Everything, Ewan McVicar, Gorgon City, Hannah Laing, Helena Hauff, Josh Baker, KETTAMA, Nia Archives, Peggy Gou, SG Lewis, Sonny Fodera, and Vintage Culture; with additional one-off shows hosted by ANOTR, John Summit, Major League DJz and Prospa.

=== Radio 1's Essential Mix ===
The Essential Mix is a weekly radio mix which features an uninterrupted two-hour mix from different contemporary DJs and music producers. The show has been presented since its inception in 1993 by Pete Tong, and is one of Radio 1's longest running programmes in the current schedule.

== Events and specials ==
=== Radio 1's Big Weekend ===
Since 2019, Radio 1 Dance has had a presence at Radio 1's flagship music festival, Radio 1's Big Weekend, hosting the line-up for the Friday night in Middlesbrough. Following the launch of the BBC Sounds stream, the brand has played a bigger part in Big Weekend events.

At the 2022 festival in Coventry, Radio 1 Dance hosted a stage across the full weekend and curated the Friday night line-up. The same format was repeated at the Dundee event in 2023, with a headline set from Jamie xx on the Friday night.

=== Radio 1 Dance Weekend ===
Radio 1 has annually held a dance music weekend broadcast live from Ibiza since the 1995, formally called Radio 1 in Ibiza. The event is usually the first weekend in August and has performances from world-famous DJs and Radio 1 Dance talent such as Pete Tong, Danny Howard, Annie Mac and Sarah Story.

==== 2020 ====
In 2020, the event was renamed Radio 1 Dance Weekend and hosted entirely virtually due to the COVID-19 pandemic. Main proceedings were hosted by Annie Mac, Danny Howard, Pete Tong and MistaJam.

Sets were pre-recorded mixes from artists and DJs at home and included Disclosure, The Blessed Madonna, Duck Sauce, Franky Wah, Danny Howard, Black Coffee, Jayda G, Four Tet, Pete Tong B2B Bonobo, Carl Cox, Becky Hill, RAYE, Duke Dumont, Gorgon City B2B Sonny Fodera, Jax Jones, MistaJam and MK. The event aimed to turn BBC Sounds into "the world's biggest nightclub" to celebrate 25 years since Radio 1's first broadcast in Ibiza.

==== 2021 ====
The event in 2021 was the first to be broadcast on both Radio 1 and Radio 1 Dance. In similar format to 2020's event, sets were pre-recorded and broadcast across the weekend, with over 70-hours of dance music content. Programmes were hosted by Danny Howard, Pete Tong, Sarah Story and Charlie Hedges.

The theme of Friday 6 August 2021 was "Around The World with Radio 1", and featured sets from Swedish House Mafia (Sweden), MK (USA), Ewan McVicar (Scotland), Shermanology (Holland), Krystal Klear (Ireland), Hannah Wants (UK), Vintage Culture (Brazil), THEMBA (South Africa), Nina Kraviz (Russia) and Andrea Oliva (Ibiza).

Special editions of Radio 1's Essential Mix were recorded at two events, some of the first following the lifting of lockdown restrictions, in the UK. The first, recorded on 24 July 2021 at Circus presents Elrow in Liverpool, aired on Saturday 6 August with DJ sets from Yousef and Paul Woolford, and the second recorded a few hours earlier in Newcastle at Shindig showcasing a set from Carl Cox aired in the early hours of Sunday 7 August.

==== 2022 ====
Radio 1 Dance Weekend returned in 2022, with a mix of both recorded sets at live events in Ibiza and exclusive radio mixes. Hosted by Radio 1 DJ's throughout the Friday, Saturday and Sunday, main Dance programmes were hosted by Danny Howard, Pete Tong, Sarah Story, Jaguar and Arielle Free.

Pete Tong hosted the Friday night proceedings from a studio at Café Mambo, while Danny Howard, Sarah Story and Jaguar hosted from Broadcasting House in London. Recorded sets were broadcast from Diplo, LF System, Skream (UKG Set), TSHA, Meg Ward, Gorgon City B2B Sonny Fodera (Ibiza Classic Mix), Jeremiah Asiamah (Afrohouse Mix), Rene LaVice B2B Charlie Tee and Sarah Story B2B Jaguar.

For the first time, the BBC licensed a new Radio 1 Dance LIVE brand to the Defected event at Eden on Friday 5 August, and ANTS at Ushuaïa on Saturday 6 August. These sets were recorded and broadcast on Radio 1 and Radio 1 Dance over the following weeks.

Radio 1 Dance also partnered with Ushuaïa, Hï and Amnesia clubs in Ibiza to showcase specially recorded Essential Mixes from Swedish House Mafia, Vintage Culture and Marco Faraone B2B Eats Everything.

==== 2023 ====
Danny Howard announced the line-up for Radio 1 Dance Weekend 2023 in January 2023. This was the first event to return to a format of full sets broadcast live at a night club in Ibiza, last used in 2019 for Radio 1 in Ibiza.

The main event on took place on Friday 28 July 2023 at new venue 528 Ibiza, with two stages - Radio 1 Dance stage and Radio 1 Dance Anthems stage. Hosted by Danny Howard, Sarah Story and Pete Tong, sets included Becky Hill, Camden Cox, Chase & Status, Eats Everything, FISHER, Hannah Wants, HoneyLuv B2B Danny Howard, Jamie Jones, Jax Jones, Katy B, LP Giobbi, The Martinez Brothers, MK, Patrick Topping, Sam Divine and Sonny Fodera B2B Arielle Free. Sets were broadcast across Friday evening (those on the Radio 1 Dance stage) and Saturday evening (those on the Radio 1 Dance Anthems stage).

Similar to 2022, the BBC licensed the Radio 1 Dance X (formerly Radio 1 Dance LIVE) brand to other already established events across Ibiza. This included ANTS Ibiza on Saturday 29 July at Ushuaïa featuring sets from Andrea Oliva B2B Patrick Topping, Arielle Free, LF System, Pete Tong, Dunmore Brothers and Solardo. On Sunday 30 July, the brand was licensed to LoveJuice Playground pool party at Ibiza Rocks with sets from Alex Mills, Charlie Hedges and D.O.D., and Glitterbox at Hï, which included Roger Sanchez and The Shapeshifters on the bill. Again, these sets were recorded and streamed over the following weeks as part of Radio 1 Dance Presents....

==== 2024 ====
In January 2024, it was announced by Danny Howard and Greg James on Radio 1 Breakfast that Radio 1 Dance Weekend would take place over two weekends, one in Ibiza from 2 to 5 August and a new event in Malta from 15 to 23 August, with tickets available to win through the main Radio 1 network's Jan Slam competition.

The event in Ibiza took place again at 528 Ibiza on Friday 2 August 2024 across two stages - Radio 1 main stage and Radio 1 Dance stage - featuring artists Armand Van Helden, Ben Hemsley, CamelPhat, Dom Dolla, D.O.D., Hannah Laing, Gorgon City, Jazzy & Belters Only, Kelli-Leigh and LF System. Following the expanded schedule on Radio 1 Dance launched in July 2024, the stream broadcast live sets from the Radio 1 Dance stage, while BBC Radio 1 broadcast live sets from the Radio 1 main stage. Arielle Free and Danny Howard hosted on the main Radio 1 network, while Martha hosted on Radio 1 Dance.

Radio 1 Dance licensed their Radio 1 Dance X brand to other events across the island. This included the Radio 1 Dance X After Party at Eden on Friday 2 August, ANTS Ibiza on Saturday 3 August at Ushuaïa, and Glitterbox at Hï on Sunday 4 August.

On 17 August 2024, Radio 1 Dance hosted their first official event at UNO Malta. Presented by Charlie Hedges, Jeremiah Asiamah and Danny Howard the line-up featured Camden Cox, Charlie Hedges, Jax Jones, Jeremiah Asiamah, Jodie Harsh, Solardo, Sonny Fodera and Zerb.

Additionally, the BBC licensed the Radio 1 Dance X brand to the main event for SummerDaze Festival on 15 August with Sam Smith, Charlie Hedges and Becky Hill, and Radio 1 Dance X at Café del Mar Malta with Danny Howard and Kungs on 18 August.

==== 2025 ====
As part of the main Radio 1 network's Jan Slam new year competition, Greg James and Danny Howard announced in January 2025 that Radio 1 Dance would return to Ibiza and Malta for a second year. Line-ups and further details were confirmed in April 2025.

The station returned to 528 Ibiza on Friday 1 August 2025 for its third consecutive year at the venue. The event featured two stages – the Radio 1 Main Stage and the Radio 1 Dance Stage. Unlike the previous year's event, both Radio 1 and Radio 1 Dance simulcast the same sets, broadcasting the Main Stage live on Friday night and the Dance Stage (recorded on Friday) on Saturday night. This change, confirmed following editorial reshuffles in the BBC Music team after the Glastonbury broadcast controversy, marked a shift from 2024 where Radio 1 and Radio 1 Dance aired separate streams. The station was also required to broadcast the Friday night live show with a 15-minute time delay.

The 2025 line-up included Alok, Biscits, Chloé Caillet, Chris Lake, Coco & Breezy, Disciples, Emily Nash, Jess Bays, Miss Monique, Olive F, Sonny Fodera, TSHA, Zerb and a special guest B2B set with Locky. Winners of BBC Introducing’s talent search, Declan Knapp and Baobei (宝贝), also performed. The broadcast was hosted by members of the Radio 1 Dance family, with performances made available on BBC Sounds and iPlayer.

Additional commercially branded Radio 1 Dance X partner events ran across the weekend:

- Friday 1 August: Following the main event at 528 Ibiza, the Radio 1 Dance X Afterparty took place at Amnesia Ibiza with sets from Josh Baker B2B Kettama, Caal, Chloé Caillet, Danny Howard and Sarah Story.
- Saturday 2 August: Radio 1 Dance X collaborated with ANTS at Ushuaïa Ibiza for a daytime party, featuring Djammin, Franky Rizardo B2B Cloonee, Jaguar, John Summit, Max Styler and Pete Tong.
- Saturday 2 August: Following ANTS at Ushuaïa, [UNVRS] Ibiza's Elrow event hosted a Radio 1 Dance X special, with Radio 1 Dance's Arielle Free, George Privati, Hugel and Matroda.
- Sunday 3 August: Glitterbox hosted a Radio 1 Dance X takeover at Hï Ibiza, featuring sets from Dan Shake B2B Myd, DJ Minx, Sophie Lloyd, Eli Escobar, Floorplan, Rich Medina, Joshua Lang and Mike Dunn.
- Monday 4 August: Following the Radio 1 Dance X pool party residency in 2024, Ibiza Rocks hosted a one-off Radio 1 Dance X day rave with DJ sets from Fish56Octagon, lau.ra, Connor Coates, Patrick Nazemi and Ibiza Rocks resident DJs.

On Saturday 16 August 2025, Radio 1 Dance returned to UNO Malta for a large-scale showcase of global DJs. The line-up included David Guetta, Becky Hill, MK, Anabel Englund, Belters Only, Charlie Hedges, Jeremiah Asiamah and Sam Divine. The event ran from 19:00 to 04:00 local time and was broadcast live on BBC Radio 1. As with the Ibiza broadcast, the station aired the sets with a 15-minute time delay.

Ahead of the main Malta event, Radio 1 Dance X partnered with Café del Mar Malta on Tuesday 12 August 2025 in St. Paul's Bay, with performances from Oliver Heldens and Arielle Free.

==== 2026 ====
In January 2026, Radio 1 announced that Radio 1 Dance Weekend would return to both Ibiza and Malta for a third consecutive year. The Malta event was announced by Charlie Hedges during Radio 1 Breakfast with Greg James on 28 January, followed by the Ibiza event, announced by Danny Howard on the programme the following day.

The Ibiza event returned to 528 Ibiza for a fourth consecutive year on Friday 31 July 2026. The venue again featured two stages, with the Radio 1 Main Stage located in the outdoor Garden and a newly configured Radio 1 Dance Stage inside the Club. The line-up featured Disclosure, Gorgon City, Jazzy, Josh Baker and Blond:ish, alongside Radio 1 Dance presenters and DJs Arielle Free, Cam Stockman, Charlie Hedges, Danny Howard, Ellie Scougall, Lu.Re, Pete Tong, Sarah Story and Selena Faider.

In a change from 2025, the two stages were again given separate broadcasts, similar to the format used in 2024. BBC Radio 1 broadcast live from the Main Stage, while Radio 1 Dance carried the Radio 1 Dance Stage. Martha presented the Radio 1 Dance coverage from BBC Broadcasting House in London. Performances from the event were subsequently made available through BBC Sounds and iPlayer.

The commercially branded Radio 1 Dance X series continued at venues across Ibiza during the weekend:

- Friday 31 July: Following the 528 Ibiza event, Radio 1 Dance X Afterparty took place at Hï Ibiza as part of Dom Dolla's Friday residency. The Theatre featured Dom Dolla, KI/KI, Dean Turnley and Anna Lunoe, while Ewan McVicar performed B2B with DART in the Club Room.
- Saturday 1 August: Radio 1 Dance X returned to ANTS at Ushuaïa Ibiza, featuring Cloonee, SOSA, Sarah Story, Julian Fijma and Emma 2000.
- Sunday 2 August: The Ibiza weekend concluded with a Radio 1 Dance X takeover during Carl Cox's residency at [UNVRS]. Cox was joined by Skepta, SYREETA B2B TSHA, Nakadia and Más Tiempo.

In Malta, the Radio 1 Dance X brand was again used in partnership with SummerDaze Festival. On Saturday 15 August, Radio 1 Dance Anthems X partnered with SummerDaze and Creamfields for an event at the Ta' Qali Concert Area headlined by Calvin Harris, with support from Arielle Free, Jeremiah Asiamah, Tyson O'Brien, Ant, Daniel Blade and Ziggy.

The main Radio 1 Dance: Malta event returned to UNO Malta on Saturday 22 August 2026. The announced line-up featured Bebe Rexha, Jonas Blue, Linska, Charlie Hedges and Jeremiah Asiamah. John Summit had also been scheduled to perform but withdrew from the event as part of the cancellation of his remaining European festival appearances in August 2026, stating that he was taking time away from performing to rest ahead of his forthcoming tour.

=== Radio 1 Dance X Pool Party at Ibiza Rocks ===
In 2024, Ibiza Rocks Hotel in Sant Antoni de Portmany licensed the Radio 1 Dance X brand from the BBC, hosting weekly pool parties every Monday at the venue from 3 June 2024 to 26 August 2024.

The line-up for 2024 included Alex Mills, Billy Gillies, Charlie Hedges, Connor Coates, D.O.D., Goodboys, Hannah Boleyn, House Gospel Choir, Jax Jones, Jazzy, Kelli-Leigh, LF System, Luude and Venbee.

=== Europe's Biggest Dance Show ===
Europe's Biggest Dance Show is a series of radio specials produced by BBC Radio 1. First broadcast in October 2019, Radio 1 joined with several European radio stations, all members of the European Broadcasting Union.

Since 2021, Danny Howard has hosted the UK segment from London, with a warm-up show airing ahead of the main broadcast each year. The programme continues to be mixed centrally by the BBC and simulcast across all participating stations.

==== 2019 ====
The inaugural broadcast included hour-long shows from BBC Radio 1 (United Kingdom), NPO 3FM (Netherlands), Mouv' (France), RTÉ 2FM (Ireland), Studio Brussel (Belgium), 1LIVE and Fritz (Germany), and Sveriges Radio P3 (Sweden). Annie Mac hosted the first hour for Radio 1 before passing onto her counterparts across Europe.

==== 2020 ====
In 2020, two editions of the show were produced. A spring edition aired in May following the announcement of COVID-19 lockdown restrictions across the continent, along with a second broadcast in October. The October 2020 show marked the first time the programme was simulcast on Radio 1 Dance, and introduced new participating countries, including NRK mP3 (Norway) and YleX (Finland). Annie Mac continued to host the UK element for Radio 1 and Radio 1 Dance.

==== 2021 ====
From 2021, Danny Howard became the UK host following the departure of Annie Mac from Radio 1. That year, Radio FM4 (Austria) joined the line-up for the first time, while Mouv' (France) and NPO 3FM (Netherlands) did not feature. The programme continued to include contributions from RTÉ 2FM (Ireland), Studio Brussel (Belgium), 1LIVE and Fritz (Germany), Sveriges Radio P3 (Sweden), NRK mP3 (Norway), and YleX (Finland).The simulcast started at 18:30 BST on 29 October 2021, but unlike in previous years, where each radio station contributed an hour, the participants contributed 30 minutes of dance music from their respective country.

==== 2022 ====
The 2022 edition introduced Radio Promin (Ukraine) to the show for the first time. NPO 3FM (Netherlands) also returned, with Danny Howard hosting the first 60 minutes from 18:00 BST on Radio 1 and Radio 1 Dance, followed by contributors from RTÉ 2FM (Ireland), Studio Brussel (Belgium), 1LIVE and Fritz (Germany), Sveriges Radio P3 (Sweden), NRK mP3 (Norway), YleX (Finland), and Radio FM4 (Austria).

==== 2023 ====
In 2023, ERR Raadio 2 (Estonia) and iCat (Spain) joined the line-up for the first time. RTÉ 2FM (Ireland) did not participate in this edition. Returning contributors included Radio Promin (Ukraine), Radio FM4 (Austria), Studio Brussel (Belgium), 1LIVE and Fritz (Germany), Sveriges Radio P3 (Sweden), NRK mP3 (Norway), YleX (Finland), and Danny Howard on Radio 1 Dance (United Kingdom).

==== 2024 ====
Europe's Biggest Dance Show 2024 included contributions from Radio Promin (Ukraine), RTÉ Pulse (Ireland), Radio FM4 (Austria), Studio Brussel (Belgium), NRK mP3 (Norway), ERR Raadio 2 (Estonia), 1LIVE and Fritz (Germany), YleX (Finland), Sveriges Radio P3 (Sweden), and Radio 1 Dance hosted by Danny Howard. Due to scheduling conflicts with Culture Night, the Irish simulcast was broadcast via RTÉ Pulse, although it retained on-air branding from RTÉ 2FM.

=== Radio 1 Dance at The Warehouse Project ===
Radio 1 Dance has curated line-ups at The Warehouse Project in Manchester, following its reopening after COVID-19 lockdown restrictions. These have included an event in November 2021 headlined by CamelPhat, and in October 2022 that was headlined by Fisher.

=== Printworks Closing Weekend ===
Radio 1 Dance hosted an event at Printworks in London for their closing weekend, before the venue shuttered in May 2023. The event was headlined Black Coffee - his debut at the club - and Maya Jane Coles, with support from Radio 1 Dance DJs Danny Howard, Arielle Free and Sarah Story. The closing weekend shows quickly sold out, marking a significant moment in the venue's history.

=== Radio 1 Dance x DRUMSHEDS ===
To celebrate 30 years of Radio 1's Essential Mix, Danny Howard announced in December 2023 on his Friday night Dance Party that Radio 1 Dance are collaborating with new London venue, DRUMSHEDS for an event on Good Friday 2024. The BBC also made thirty Essential Mixes from the last 30 years available on BBC Sounds, as picked by a select panel and the Radio 1 Dance family.

== Current presenters ==
- Arielle Free (Radio 1 Dance Morning, 9 am – 12 pm)
- Matty Chiabi (Radio 1 Dance playlist, 12–3 pm)
- Charlie Tee (Radio 1 Dance Party Starters, 3–4 pm; and Radio 1's Drum & Bass Show, Saturday 11 pm – 1 am)
- Charlie Hedges (Radio 1's Dance Anthems, Monday to Friday 4–6 pm; Saturday and Sunday 4–7 pm)
- Pete Tong (Global Dance HQ, Monday to Wednesday 6–8 pm; Fridays 10 pm – midnight; and Essential History of Dance, Saturday and Sunday 7–9 pm)
- Danny Howard (Radio 1's Dance Party, Thursday and Friday 6–8 pm)
- Sarah Story (Radio 1's Future Dance, Friday 8–10 pm)
- Jaguar (BBC Introducing on Radio 1 Dance, Thursday 10–11 pm; Sunday 9–11 pm)
- Martha (Tuesday midnight – 2 am)
- Connor Coates (relief presenter for Radio 1 Dance playlist 12–3 pm; and Radio 1's Dance Anthems Saturday 4–7 pm)

== See also ==
- BBC Radio 1 Relax
- BBC Radio 1 Anthems
