= BBC Radio 6 Indie Forever =

British digital radio stream

- United Kingdom

Programming
- Language: English
- Format: Indie rock, indie pop, alternative rock

Ownership
- Owner: BBC
- Sister stations: BBC Radio 6 Music

History
- First air date: 22 July 2026; 38 days ago

Links
- Webcast: BBC Radio 6 Indie Forever

BBC Radio 6 Indie Forever, also referred to as 6 Music Indie Forever, is a national digital radio stream in the United Kingdom, owned and operated by the BBC and run as a spin-off from BBC Radio 6 Music. The stream is dedicated to indie rock, indie pop and classic indie music, and will broadcast exclusively on BBC Sounds.

== History and launch ==
From as early as November 2019, reports showed that the BBC was considering launching spin-off services from some of its national radio stations in order to attract more listeners. Reported examples included Radio 1 Dance and Radio 2 80s, with speculation that approval might be faster if the services were streamed on BBC Sounds rather than broadcast on DAB.

In February 2020, Jonathan Wall, controller of BBC Sounds, confirmed that Radio 1 Dance would launch as a 24-hour BBC Sounds stream. Wall said the service would bring together existing dance programmes from BBC Radio 1 and argued that changing listening habits meant BBC Sounds needed to make it easier for audiences to find BBC content outside traditional linear schedules. Radio 1 Dance launched on BBC Sounds in October 2020.

The BBC later developed further brand extensions. In July 2025, Ofcom approved the BBC's plans for three new DAB+ stations: BBC Radio 1 Dance, BBC Radio 1 Anthems and BBC Radio 3 Unwind. The regulator allowed those services to proceed, but rejected the BBC's proposed Radio 2 extension and the proposed expansion of BBC Radio 5 Sports Extra. Radio 1 Dance, Radio 1 Anthems and Radio 3 Unwind became available on DAB+ in September 2025, in addition to BBC Sounds.

In February 2026, the BBC announced plans to launch a round-the-clock indie music stream on BBC Sounds as an extension of BBC Radio 6 Music, subject to regulatory approval. The proposed service was described as being dedicated to indie rock and pop from the 1980s to the 2010s, with newly made programmes, archive material from the BBC and programming reflecting regional music scenes and independent venues.

The planned launch was met with concern from commercial radio bodies. Radiocentre, the industry body for commercial radio, said it was surprised by the announcement while the regulatory process was still ongoing, and argued that any expansion by the BBC was likely to have an impact on competition.

In April 2026, Ofcom reviewed the BBC's materiality assessment for the proposed 6 Music additional stream. The regulator concluded that the proposal did not appear likely to have a significant adverse impact on fair and effective competition, meaning the BBC did not need to carry out a Public Interest Test before launch.

On 8 July 2026, BBC Radio 6 Music announced that the stream would be called Indie Forever and would launch on BBC Sounds on 22 July 2026. The BBC said the 24-hour stream would play indie music from the 1980s to the 2010s and beyond, with UK artists making up 70% of the playlist. Artists expected to feature include The Stone Roses, Oasis, Blur, Pulp, The Verve, The Strokes, Arctic Monkeys, The Killers, Florence and the Machine, Yeah Yeah Yeahs, The xx, Wolf Alice, The 1975, Sam Fender and Blossoms.

Samantha Moy, Head of BBC Radio 6 Music, said that the stream would tell the stories and play the songs that had soundtracked the UK's independent music scene over 40 years. She described it as "a version of 6 Music that's pure, unadulterated indie".

== Programming ==
The launch schedule includes The Morning Session with Steve Lamacq and Felix White, a weekday programme hosted by Steve Lamacq and Felix White of The Maccabees. The programme is intended as a homage to BBC Radio 1's Evening Session, which was associated with Britpop and 1990s indie music.

=== Monday to Thursday ===
City Soundtracks will air from Monday to Thursday, presented by 6 Music and BBC Introducing's Emily Pilbeam. The programmes will be produced in collaboration with Music Venue Trust and BBC Introducing, and will be based in independent venues across the United Kingdom. Each programme will explore the contribution made by a city and its surrounding area to UK independent music, while also featuring emerging artists from grassroots venues.

=== Friday ===
Each Friday, the stream will simulcast 6 Music's existing indie music programme Indie Forever, presented by Nathan Shepherd. The programme features upbeat indie tracks, mixing classics with future releases.

Indie Forever Disco with Beth Ditto will air on Fridays and Saturdays. The programme is hosted by Beth Ditto, frontwoman of Gossip, and features indie music aimed at the dancefloor.

=== Saturday ===
On Saturday 25 July 2026, the stream will air The Rise and Fall of The Smiths, presented by Steve Lamacq and Elizabeth Alker. The series uses BBC archive material to tell the story of The Smiths, including rare and previously unheard recordings. It will be followed by The Smiths Artist Collection, featuring BBC session tracks, live performances and archive programmes presented by members of the band.

From 1 August 2026, the stream will repeat Jarvis Cocker's Someday Service on Saturdays. The programme began airing on BBC Radio 6 Music in April 2026.

=== Sunday ===
On Sunday 26 July 2026, the stream will air The Rise and Fall (and Rise Again) of Oasis, presented by Steve Lamacq and Jo Whiley. The programme focuses on the relationship between Liam Gallagher and Noel Gallagher, with interviews from bandmates, producers and industry figures. It will be followed by an Oasis artist collection featuring highlights from Knebworth 1996, the band's 1997 Evening Session interview and Noel Gallagher's reflections on the first ten years of Oasis.

From 2 August 2026, Jarvis Cocker's earlier Sunday Service, which was broadcast on 6 Music from 2010 to 2017, will be repeated on Sundays.

=== Music mixes and archive programming ===
The stream will feature artist collections from the BBC archive, including live performance compilations, historic interviews, artist-presented BBC programmes and dedicated playlists. Artists scheduled to be featured during August 2026 include The Strokes, Yeah Yeah Yeahs, Wolf Alice, The White Stripes and Biffy Clyro.

Additional music mixes include Indie Chill, presented by Huw Stephens, Indie Focus, presented by Lauren Laverne, and Indie Cloudbusters, presented by Nick Grimshaw and Nathan Shepherd. The voice of actor and comedian Sophie Willan will introduce upcoming programmes on the stream.

== Production ==
Several programmes on Indie Forever are produced by independent production companies based around the United Kingdom. City Soundtracks is produced by True Thought Productions in the West Midlands, Indie Chill and Indie Focus by Audio Always in Salford, Indie Cloudbusters by Bengo Media in Cardiff, The Morning Session with Steve Lamacq and Felix White by Cup and Nuzzle in London, and Indie Forever and Indie Forever Playlists by We Are Grape in Salford. Indie Forever Disco is produced by BBC Audio in London.

== See also ==
- BBC Radio 1 Dance
- BBC Radio 1 Anthems
- BBC Radio 3 Unwind
- BBC Sounds
- BBC Radio 6 Music
