= BBC Radio =

Division and service of the British Broadcasting Corporation

- Logo used since 2021
- Type: Division
- Industry: Mass media
- Founded: 18 October 1922; 104 years ago
- Headquarters: Broadcasting House, London; MediaCityUK, Salford
- Area served: Worldwide
- Key people: Bob Shennan (group managing director, BBC); Lorna Clarke – controller, Pop; Aled Haydn Jones – controller, Radio 1; Helen Thomas – controller, Radio 2; Alan Davey – controller, Radio 3 and Classical; Mohit Bakaya – controller, Radio 4 and 4 Extra; Heidi Dawson – controller, Radio 5 Live and 5 Sports Extra; Jonathan Wall – controller, BBC Sounds; Graham Ellis – controller, BBC Audio
- Services: Radio broadcasting
- Parent: BBC
- Website: bbc.co.uk/sounds (UK only); bbc.com/audio (worldwide)

BBC Radio is an operational business division and service of the British Broadcasting Corporation (BBC) which has operated in the United Kingdom under the terms of a royal charter since 1927. The service provides national radio stations covering the majority of musical genres, as well as local radio stations covering local news, affairs, and interests. It also oversees online audio content.

Of the national radio stations, 1, 2, 3, 4, and 5 Live are all available through analogue radio (1, 2, 3 and 4 on FM and 5 Live on MW) as well as on DAB Digital Radio, BBC Sounds and broadcast television platforms (Sky, Freeview, Freesat and Virgin Media). 1 Anthems, 1 Dance, 1Xtra, 3 Unwind, 4 Extra, 5 Sports Extra, 6 Music, Asian Network (Note: Asian Network broadcasts on MW in some parts of the English Midlands.) and the World Service broadcast only on DAB, BBC Sounds and broadcast television platforms. All of the BBC's national radio stations broadcast from bases in London and Manchester, usually in or near to Broadcasting House or MediaCityUK. However, the BBC's network production units located in Belfast, Birmingham, Bristol, Cardiff and Glasgow also make radio programmes.

== History ==
The BBC's radio services began in 1922. The British Government licensed the BBC through its General Post Office, which had original control of the airwaves because they had been interpreted under law as an extension of the Post Office services. Today radio broadcasting still makes up a large part of the corporation's output.

=== First charter ===
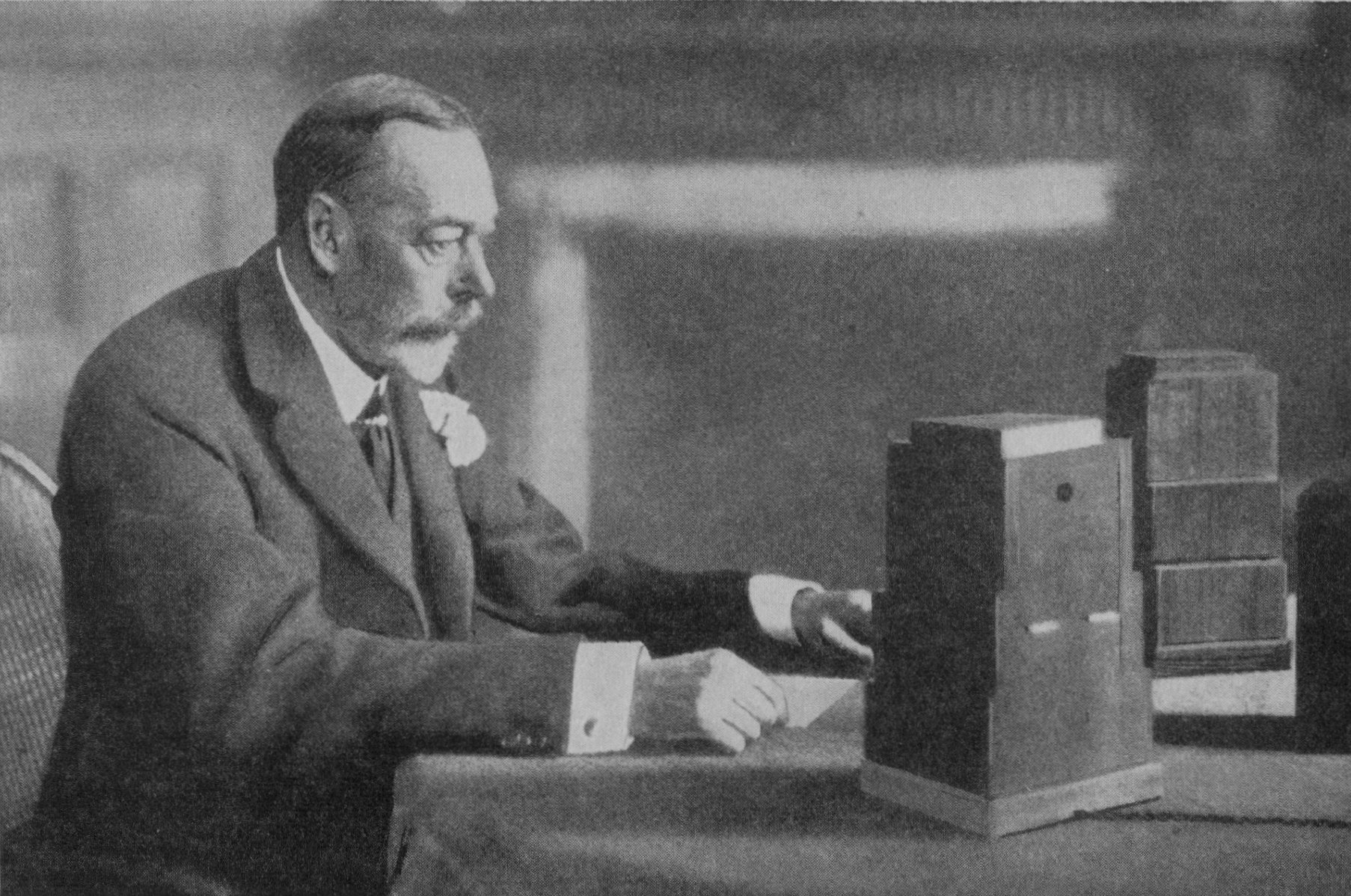
George V giving the 1934 Royal Christmas Message on BBC Radio

On 1 January 1927, the British Broadcasting Company was succeeded in monopoly control of the airwaves by the British Broadcasting Corporation, under the terms of a royal charter.

John Reith, who had been the founding managing director of the commercial company, became the first Director-General. He expounded firm principles of centralised, all-encompassing radio broadcasting, stressing programming standards and moral tone. These he set out in his 1924 autobiography, Broadcast Over Britain, influencing modern ideas of public service broadcasting in the United Kingdom. To this day, the BBC aims to follow the Reithian directive to "inform, educate and entertain".

=== Competition from overseas stations ===
Although no other broadcasting organisation was licensed in the UK until 1973, commercial competition soon opened up from overseas. The English language service of Radio Luxembourg began in 1933 as one of the earliest commercial radio stations broadcasting to Britain and Ireland. With no possibility of domestic commercial broadcasting in the UK, a former British Royal Air Force captain and entrepreneur (and from 1935 Conservative Party MP) named Leonard Plugge set up his own International Broadcasting Company in 1931. The IBC began leasing time on transmitters in continental Europe and then reselling it as sponsored English-language programming aimed at audiences in Britain and Ireland. Because Plugge successfully demonstrated that state monopolies such as that of the BBC could be broken, other parties became attracted to the idea of creating a new commercial radio station specifically for this purpose. It was an important forerunner of pirate radio and modern commercial radio in the United Kingdom. The onset of World War II silenced all but one of the original IBC stations, with only Radio Luxembourg continuing its nightly transmissions to Britain.

=== Empire and the world ===
To provide a different service from the domestic audience the Corporation started the BBC Empire Service on short wave in 1932, originally in English but it soon provided programmes in other languages. At the start of the Second World War it was renamed The Overseas Service and is now known as the BBC World Service.

=== Commercial radio influence ===
Beginning in March 1964, Radio Caroline became the first of what would become ten offshore pirate radio stations that began to ring the British coastline, mostly along the south-east coast. By 1966 millions were tuning into these commercial stations, and the BBC was rapidly losing its radio listening audience. This was largely due to the fact that even though they were fully aware of the problem, the BBC still only played a few hours of pop music records a week, as opposed to the pirates which broadcast chart music and new releases every day.

The British government reacted by passing the Marine, &c., Broadcasting (Offences) Act 1967, which virtually wiped out all of the pirate stations at midnight on 14 August 1967, by banning any British citizen from working for a pirate station. Only Radio Caroline survived, and continues to broadcast today, though the last original offshore broadcast was in 1989.

One of the stations, Radio London (also known as "Big L"), was so successful that the BBC was told to copy it as best they could. This led to a complete overhaul by Frank Gillard, the BBC's director of radio output, creating the four analogue channels that still form the basis of its broadcasting today. The creator of Radio 1 told the press that his family had been fans of Radio London.

The BBC hired many out-of-work broadcasting staff who had come from the former offshore stations. Kenny Everett was asked for input in how to run the new pop station due to his popularity with both listeners and fellow presenters. Tony Blackburn, who presented the first Radio 1 Breakfast show, had previously presented the morning show on Radio Caroline and later on Radio London. He attempted to duplicate the same sound for Radio 1. Among the other DJs hired was John Peel, who had presented the overnight show on Radio London, called The Perfumed Garden. Though it only ran for a few months prior to Radio London's closure, The Perfumed Garden got more fan mail than the rest of the pop DJs on Radio London combined, so much that staff wondered what to do with it all. The reason it got so much mail was that it played different music and was the beginning of the "album rock" genre. On Everett's suggestion, Radio London's PAMS jingles were commissioned to be re-recorded in Dallas, Texas, so that "Wonderful Radio London" became "Wonderful Radio One on BBC".

The second half of the 1990s saw the BBC's more popular stations start to encounter pressure from the commercial sector due to the repositioning of BBC Radio 1 and the arrival of more commercial stations. and John Myers, who had developed commercial brands such as Century Radio and Real Radio, was asked in the first quarter of 2011 to conduct a review into the efficiencies of Radios 1, 2, 1Xtra and 6 Music. His role, according to Andrew Harrison, the chief executive of RadioCentre, was "to identify both areas of best practice and possible savings."

=== BBC analogue networks ===
On 30 September 1967:

- BBC Radio 1 was launched as a pop music station, initially on a part-time basis.
- The BBC Light Programme (launched 29 July 1945) was renamed BBC Radio 2 and broadcast easy listening music, folk, jazz, light entertainment and sport.
- The evening BBC Third Programme (launched 29 September 1946) and daytime BBC Music Programme (launched 22 March 1965) were merged under the heading of BBC Radio 3, although the Third Programme kept its separate title until 3 April 1970.
- The BBC Home Service (launched 1 September 1939) became BBC Radio 4.

On 27 August 1990, the BBC launched a fifth national network – BBC Radio 5. It aired sport, educational and children's programming. It was replaced by BBC Radio 5 Live, a dedicated news and sport network, on 28 March 1994.

=== 2002 digital radio networks ===
With the increased rollout of Digital Audio Broadcasting (DAB) between 1995 and 2002, BBC Radio launched several new digital-only stations BBC 1Xtra, BBC 6 Music and BBC 7 in 2002 on 16 August 11 March and 15 December respectively – the first for "new black British music", the second as a source of performance-based "alternative" music, the latter specialising in archive classic comedy shows, drama and children's programmes. BBC Asian Network joined the national DAB network on 28 October 2002. The stations had "Radio" added to their names in 2008. In 2011, BBC Radio 7 was renamed BBC Radio 4 Extra and the service was more closely aligned with Radio 4.

=== 2020s spin-off stations ===
At the start of the 2020s, two Radio 1 spin-offs were launched on BBC Sounds, BBC Radio 1 Dance in October 2020, followed by BBC Radio 1 Relax, in April 2021. Radio 1 Relax however closed in July 2024.

In February 2024, the corporation announced plans to launch three new spin-offs, as well as to broadcast Radio 1 Dance on DAB with expanded programming, pending public consultation and regulatory approval. BBC Radio 3 Unwind, featuring "calming classical music", launched on 4 November 2024, followed on 8 November by BBC Radio 1 Anthems, for "music from the 2000s and 2010s, catering to the appetite from young audiences for recent nostalgia". A Radio 2 spin-off, with "'a distinctive take on pop nostalgia' from the 50s, 60s and 70s", was also proposed, but was rejected by Ofcom in July 2025.

== Stations ==
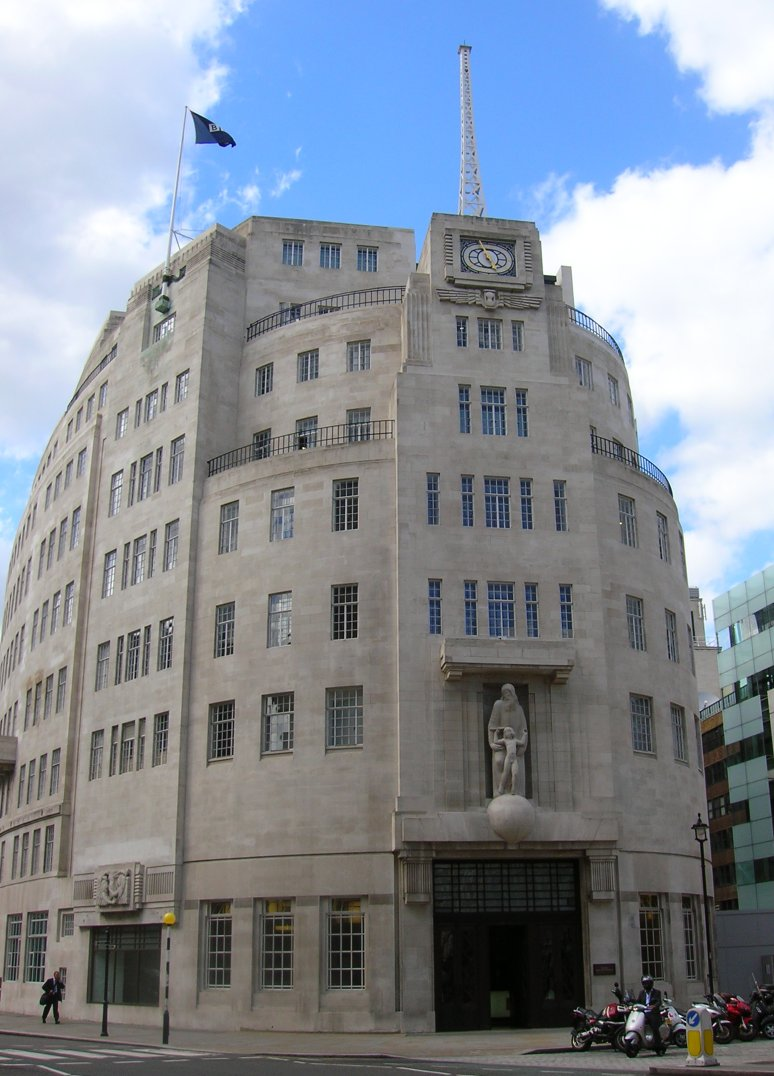
Much of BBC radio comes from Broadcasting House, Portland Place at the head of Regent Street, London

=== National (UK-wide) ===
The BBC today runs national domestic radio stations, six of which are available in analogue formats (via FM or AM), while others have a purely digital format – they can be received via DAB Digital Radio, UK digital television (satellite, cable and Freeview) plus live streams and listen again on BBC Sounds. The current stations are:

- BBC Radio 1 – youth-oriented popular music, including talk, entertainment and alternative music, plus news, original in-house live music sessions, original live music concerts and music documentaries. Available on 97–99 FM and on digital platforms.

Slogan:	The biggest new pop and all day vibes

- BBC Radio 1 Anthems – music played by Radio 1 from late 90s to the present day. Available only on digital platforms.

Slogan:	All day anthems from the 00s to now

- BBC Radio 1 Dance – electronic dance music, along with mixes and dance-orientated music. Available only on digital platforms.

Slogan:	The biggest current, future and classic dance vibes

- BBC Radio 1Xtra – a mix of Black music and content, plus news, original in-house live music sessions, original live music concerts and music documentaries. The service simulcasts Radio 1 from 21:00 to 23:00 on Saturdays. Available only on digital platforms.

Slogan:	Amplifying Black music and culture

- BBC Radio 2 – adult-oriented popular music, along with talk, entertainment and alternative music, plus news, original in-house live music sessions, original live music concerts and music documentaries. Available on 88–91 FM and on digital platforms.

Slogan:	Lift your day with the best tunes from your favourite DJs

- BBC Radio 3 – classical, jazz and world music, arts and high culture, plus news, original in-house live music sessions, original live music concerts and music documentaries. Available on 90–93 FM and digital platforms.

Slogan:	Adventures in classical

- BBC Radio 3 Unwind - relaxing, calming classical music along with meditation-orientated shows. Available only on digital platforms.

Slogan:	Music to unwind your mind

- BBC Radio 4 – news, current affairs, arts, history, original in-house drama, original in-house first-run comedy, science, books and religious programming. The service simulcasts the World Service from 01:00 to 05:00 (weekdays) and 05:30 (weekends). Available on 92–95 FM, on 103–105 FM, and on digital platforms.

Slogan:	Inquisitive speech radio to make sense of your world

- BBC Radio 4 Extra – classic comedy, drama, books, science fiction, fantasy and children's programmes. Also broadcasts the Daily Service. Originally named BBC Radio 7. Available only on digital platforms.

Slogan:	Journey into the Radio 4 archive

- BBC Radio 5 Live – news, current affairs, live sports coverage, phone-ins and talk programming, launched in 1994 as a replacement of the original Radio 5. The service is simulcast on BBC Local Radio stations from 01:00 to 06:00 daily. Available on 693 and 909 MW and on digital platforms.

Slogan:	The voice of the UK - breaking news and live sport

- BBC Radio 5 Sports Extra – a sister station to Radio 5 Live for additional coverage of sporting events. Supplemented by Sports Extra 2 and Sports Extra 3 live streams on BBC Sounds. Available only on digital platforms.

Slogan:	More live sport. Pure live sport.

- BBC Radio 6 Music – an eclectic mix of alternative music and genres, plus news, original in-house live music sessions, original live music concerts and music documentaries. Available only on digital platforms.

Slogan:	Music beyond the mainstream

- BBC Radio 6 Indie Forever – indie rock and pop music from the 1980s to the present day, including mixes and indie-themed programming. Available exclusively on BBC Sounds.

Slogan:	Proper indie music... all day, every day

- BBC Asian Network – a variety of South Asian music and talk, plus news, original in-house live music sessions, original live music concerts and music documentaries. Available on digital platforms nationally and medium wave in parts of the English Midlands and Cambridgeshire.

Slogan:	Celebrating British Asian identity

- CBeebies Radio – an audio version of the CBeebies television channel with a range of content for young children. Available only on BBC Sounds.

Slogan:	Songs, stories and fun. It's CBeebies for your ears

=== Nations, regions and local stations ===
The BBC also operates radio stations for three UK nations: Wales, Scotland, and Northern Ireland. These stations focus on local issues to a greater extent than their UK-wide counterparts, organising live phone-in debates about these issues, as well as lighter talk shows with music from different decades of the 20th and 21st centuries. Compared to the majority of the UK's commercially funded radio stations, which generally broadcast little beyond contemporary popular music, the BBC's "national regional" stations offer a more diverse range of programming.

- BBC Radio Wales: a variety of programming for Wales.
- BBC Radio Cymru: programming in Welsh language, with opt-out station BBC Radio Cymru 2.
- BBC Radio Scotland: a variety of programming for Scotland, with Orkney and Shetland opt-outs.
- BBC Radio nan Gàidheal: programming in Scottish Gaelic language.
- BBC Radio Ulster: a variety of programming for Northern Ireland, with opt-out station BBC Radio Foyle.

==== Local services ====
There are forty BBC Local Radio services across England and the Channel Islands, often catering to individual counties, cities, or wider regions.

=== World Service ===
BBC World Service is one of the world's largest international broadcasters, broadcasting in 27 languages to many parts of the world via analogue and digital shortwave, internet streaming and podcasting, satellite, FM and MW relays and simulcasts on Radio 4 from 01:00 to 05:00 (05:30 on weekends) and Radio Cymru from 00:00 to 05:30. It is politically independent (by mandate of the Agreement providing details of the topics outlined in the BBC Charter), non-profit, and commercial-free. The English language service had always had a UK listenership on LW and therefore DAB services allowed it to be now available 24/7 for this audience in better quality reception.

Slogan:	News and views from the world's radio station

=== Live BBC News ===
A 24-hour news station mixing the flagship news programmes from BBC News channel, Radio 4, 5 Live and World Service available only on BBC Sounds.

Slogan:	Live news as it breaks from across the BBC

== Broadcasting ==
BBC Radio services are broadcast on various FM and AM frequencies, DAB digital radio and live streaming on BBC Sounds, which is available worldwide.

They are also available on digital television in the UK, and archived programmes are available for 30 days or more after broadcast on BBC Sounds; many shows are available as podcasts.

=== International syndication ===
The BBC also syndicates radio and podcast content to radio stations and other broadcasting services around the globe, through its BBC Radio International business, which is part of BBC Studios. Programmes regularly syndicated by BBC Radio International include: In Concert (live rock music recordings from BBC Radio 1 and BBC Radio 2, including an archive dating back to 1971); interviews, live sessions and music shows; classical music (including performances from the BBC Proms); spoken word (music documentaries, dramas, readings, features and comedies, mainly from BBC Radio 4) and channels, including BBC Radio 1.

BBC Radio International also provides many services internationally including in-flight entertainment, subscription, and satellite services. BBC Radio International is partnered with Sirius Satellite Radio and British Airways as well as many other local radio stations.

== Programmes ==
Throughout its history the BBC has produced many radio programmes. Particularly significant, influential, popular or long-lasting programmes include:

- Any Questions? (1948–present): Topical debate series.
- The Archers (1951–present): Long running rural soap opera.
- Children's Hour (1922–1964): Long running slot for children's programmes.
- Desert Island Discs (1942–present): Interview programme in which the guest chooses the eight pieces of music they would take with them to a desert island. The longest running music radio programme in British history.
- Friday Night Is Music Night (1953–present): Long running live music show, covering a wide range of music tastes.
- Gardeners' Question Time (1947–present): Gardening programme in which gardening experts give advice and answer listeners' questions.
- The Goon Show (1951–1960): Highly influential comedy series with elements of surrealism.
- Hancock's Half Hour (1954–1960): Influential comedy series which transferred to television.
- The Hitchhiker's Guide to the Galaxy (1978–1980 and 2004–2005): Comedy science fiction serial by Douglas Adams.
- I'm Sorry I Haven't a Clue (1972–present): Comedy series parodying the radio panel game format.
- It's That Man Again (1939–1949): Comedy series popular during and after World War II.
- Journey into Space (1953–1958): Science fiction series which was the last UK radio programme to achieve a higher audience than television.
- Just a Minute (1967–present): Long running panel game where the contestants must attempt to speak for one minute without repetition, hesitation or deviation.
- Letter from America (1946–2004): Commentary on American news and events by Alistair Cooke. The longest-running speech radio programme in history.
- The News Quiz (1977–present): Topical comedy show
- The Reith Lectures (1948–present): Annual series of lectures given by leading figures of the day.
- Round the Horne (1965–1968): Comedy series notable for its innuendo and use of the gay slang polari.
- Sports Report (1948–present): Saturday sports round-up including the classified football results.
- Test Match Special (1957–present): Live cricket coverage.
- Today programme (1957–present): Early morning news and current affairs programme.
- Top Gear / The John Peel Show (1965–2004): Pioneering and influential alternative music programme. Originally fronted by Brian Matthew as a live music show, which featured unique performances by many top names such as The Beatles, The Who and Jimi Hendrix. Changed name to simply The John Peel Show in the early 1970s
- Woman's Hour (1946–present): Long running magazine programme for women.
- Workers' Playtime (1941–1964): Lunchtime variety show.
- The World at One (1965–present): Lunchtime news show.

== Expenditure ==
The following expenditure figures are from 2024/25 and show the expenditure of each service they are obliged to provide:

Service	2024/25 Total Cost (£million)	Comparison with 2023/24 (£million)
BBC Radio 1	41	0
BBC Radio 1Xtra	9	– 1
BBC Radio 2	49	0
BBC Radio 3	37	– 1
BBC Radio 4	84	– 3
BBC Radio 4 Extra	4	+ 1
BBC Radio 5 Live	57	– 1
BBC Radio 5 Sports Extra	6	+ 2
BBC Radio 6 Music	13	– 1
BBC Asian Network	7	0
BBC Local Radio	109	– 11
BBC Radio Scotland	23	0
BBC Radio nan Gàidheal	4	0
BBC Radio Wales	13	– 1
BBC Radio Cymru	14	0
BBC Radio Ulster and BBC Radio Foyle	21	0
Total	491	– 16

== Directors ==
Appointed	Director
1963	Frank Gillard
1970	Ian Trethowan
1976	Howard Newby
1978	Aubrey Singer
1982	Richard Francis
1986	Brian Wenham
1987	David Hatch
1993	Liz Forgan
1996	Matthew Bannister
1999	Jenny Abramsky
2008	Tim Davie
2013	Helen Boaden
2016	James Purnell

== See also ==
- BBC Radio Drama
- BBC Radio Drama Company
- BBC Television, BBC domestic television services
- British Broadcasting Company
- CBC Radio, the Canadian correspondent
- List of BBC Radio programmes adapted for television
- List of songs banned by the BBC
- NPR, the closest American correspondent
