= Sarah Story =

English radio presenter and DJ

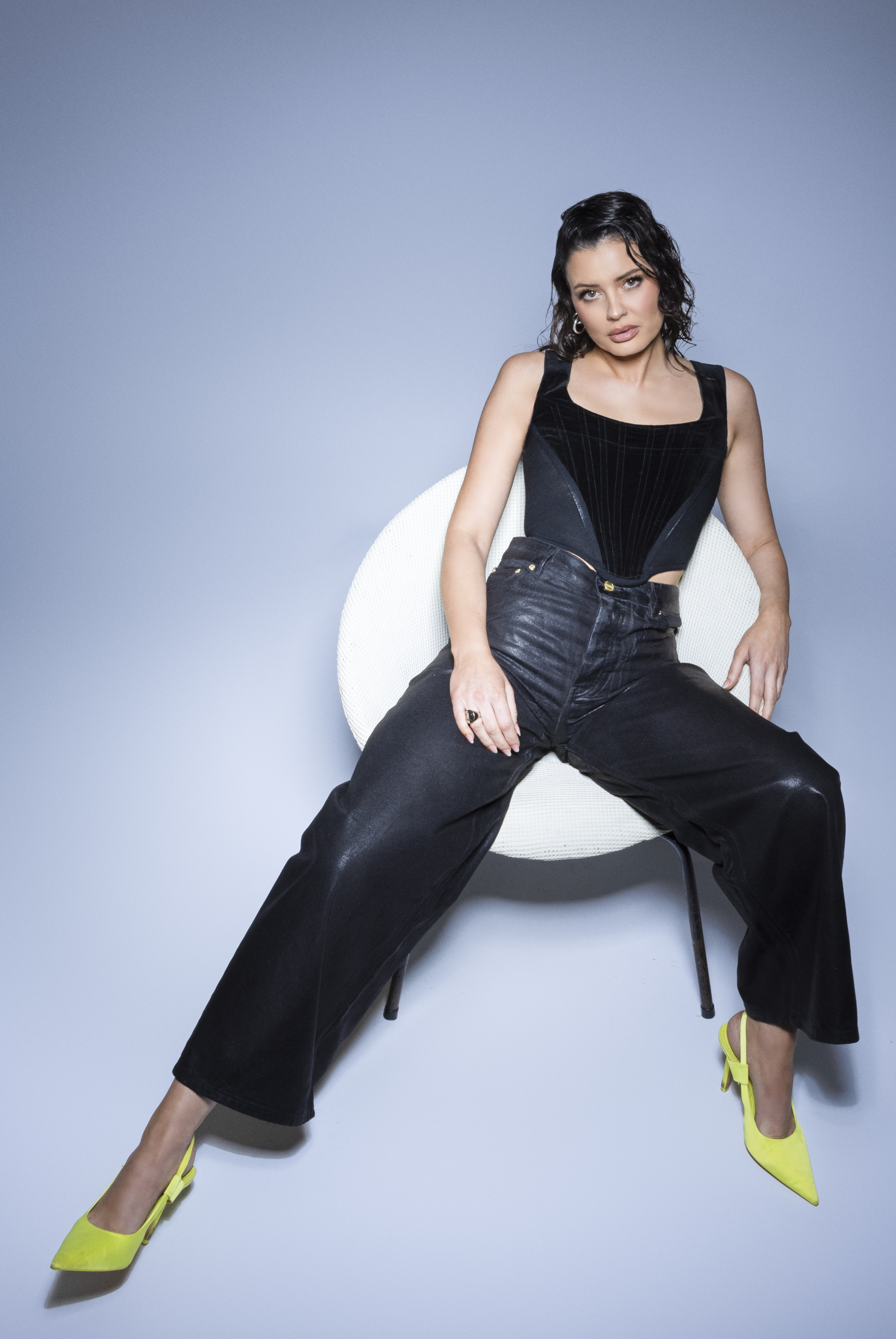
- Story in 2023
- Born: Sarah Story; Carlisle, Cumbria, England
- Occupations: DJ, radio presenter
- Employer: BBC Radio 1

Sarah Story is a British DJ and radio DJ. She is best known for presenting BBC Radio 1's Future Dance. Before then, she was a DJ for Capital's Weekender.

== Early life ==
Story grew up in Dalston, just outside Carlisle but has a slight Leeds accent.

== Career ==
Story started her broadcasting career at the age of 14, doing work experience at Greatest Hits Radio Cumbria & South West Scotland, leading to her co-hosting the station's Saturday morning breakfast show. She has presented numerous shows on the Capital network, including the breakfast and drive-time slots, as well as co-hosting the Capital Weekender with Ministry of Sound (22:00, Friday/Saturday to 06:00, Saturday/Sunday).

As part of BBC Radio 1's guest-presenter takeover over the Christmas and New Year period, Story hosted Radio 1's Dance Party on BBC Radio 1 on 1 January 2021. Following the announcement on 20 April that Annie Mac would be leaving the station in July, it was announced that Story would become the new presenter of Radio 1's Future Dance (Fridays, 20:00 to 22:00), filling the slot vacated by Danny Howard, who would replace Mac on Radio 1's Dance Party.
