= Charlie Hedges =

Radio presenter and DJ

Charlotte Hedges
- Born: 18 July 1986 (age 40); London, England
- Occupations: DJ, Radio presenter
- Employer: BBC
- Known for: Radio and DJ sets
- Children: 1

Charlotte Hedges (born 18 July 1986) is a British disc jockey who presented as part of Rickie, Melvin and Charlie and currently hosts Radio 1's Dance Anthems on BBC Radio 1 and Radio 1 Dance.

== Early life ==
Hedges studied journalism at Harlow College.

== Career ==
=== Radio presenting ===
Hedges hosted the breakfast show at Kiss for ten years with Rickie Haywood-Williams and Melvin Odoom. The trio are known as Rickie, Melvin and Charlie. In November 2018, it was announced that they would move to BBC Radio 1 to replace Charlie Sloth in the mid-evening slot. Their new show debuted on 1 April 2019. On 20 April 2021, it was announced that the trio would be moving to the mid-morning slot then occupied by Clara Amfo, who would take over the early evening slot from Annie Mac.

In September 2020, it was announced that Hedges would replace MistaJam as the host of Radio 1's Dance Anthems on Saturday afternoons. She took over the following month.

=== DJ ===
Hedges has performed DJ sets at various clubs and festivals. In 2014, she released a single titled "Best Night OML" with vocals from JB Gill. In 2016, she released a single titled "Kaleidoscope" on Armada Deep featuring vocalist Sonny Reeves.

== Personal life ==
Hedges announced on the Radio 1 Breakfast show on 8 March 2022 that she was pregnant. On 13 August 2022, she gave birth to a daughter.
