= International Music Summit =

International music industry conference

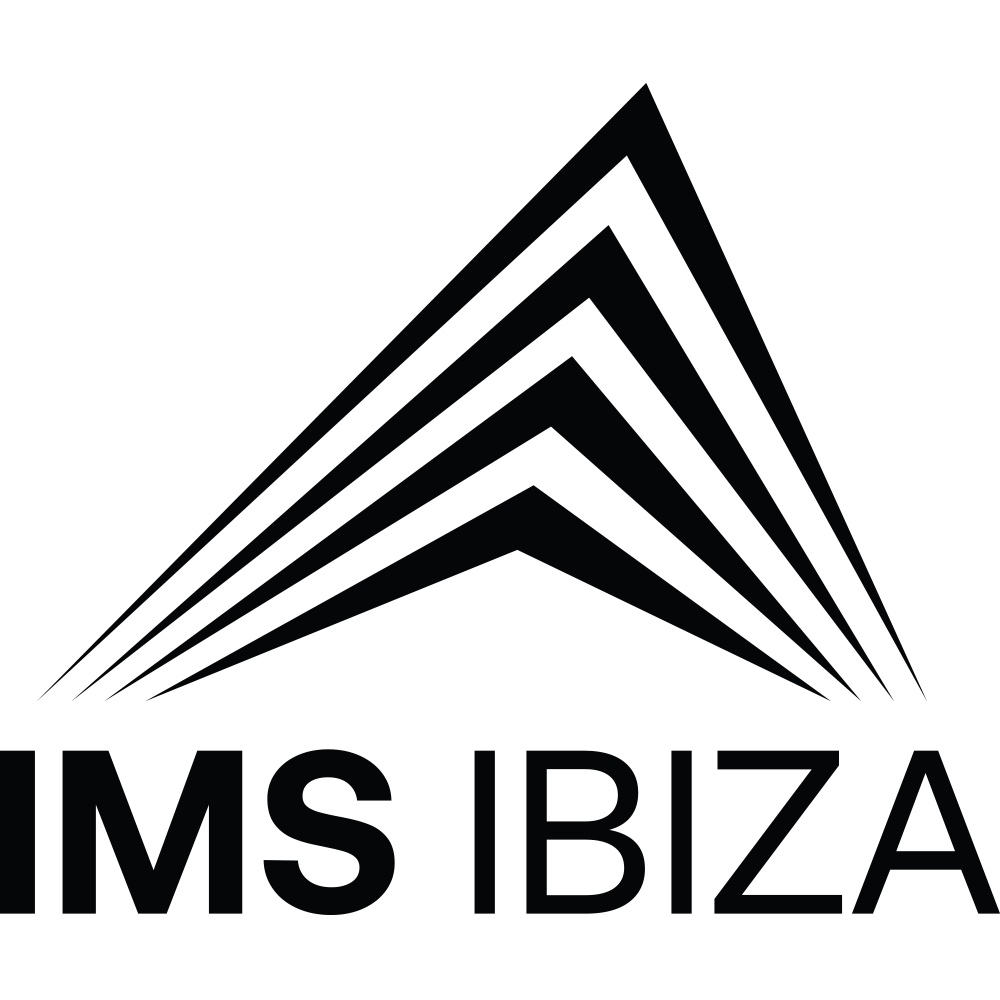
- Genre: Dance music, Electronic music
- Dates: April / May
- Location: Ibiza
- Years active: 2007 - present
- Founders: Pete Tong, Ben Turner, Dany Whittle, Mark Netto, Simeon Friend
- Website: IMS Official Site

International Music Summit (IMS) is an international conference on the electronic music industry that takes place annually in Ibiza over three days. IMS was co-founded in 2007 by Pete Tong, Ben Turner, Danny Whittle, Mark Netto and Simeon Friend. It consists of speakers, performers, masterclasses and the presentation of the IMS Business Report. Its primary focus is on promoting sustainable growth within the electronic music industry. In 2023, Beatport, a long-time partner of the summit, acquired a majority stake in IMS.

== History ==
Held annually over three days, at the launch of the Ibiza season, IMS is a summit promoting the electronic music industry. Established in 2007 by Pete Tong, Ben Turner, Danny Whittle, Mark Netto and Simeon Friend, now co-hosted by Pete Tong and Jaguar, it features speakers, seminars, technology masterclasses, performances and the presentation of the annual IMS Business Report.

Originally centred on industry topics, the purpose of the summit is now focused on influencing sustainable change within the industry, platforming issues including climate change, mental health, diversity and inclusion, and the impact of technology on the global electronic music industry.

In 2012, the Association for Electronic Music was formed from the delegates floor of IMS, following discussions on the need for a global voice for electronic music. Following an initial meeting, the AFEM was co-founded by Ben Turner and Kurosh Nasseri, and officially launched in 2013.

In February 2023, it was announced the US-owned online music store Beatport, a long-time partner of the summit, had acquired a majority stake in IMS. IMS continues to be operated under the direction of its co-founders and General Manager Katie Sallows.

== Programme ==
=== Speakers ===
IMS presents prominent speakers from the electronic music industry as their keynotes and speakers. Past keynotes have included Richie Hawtin (2009), David Guetta (2010), David Lynch (2011), Carl Cox (2012), Nile Rodgers (2012), George Clinton (2014), Erick Morillo (2016), Pet Shop Boys (2016), New Order (2017), Charlotte de Witte (2019), Brian Eno (2022), and Grimes (2023). Other notable speakers include Lyor Cohen, Duran Duran and Errol Alkan (2022), Fabio and Grooverider (2022), Nora En Pure (2022), Ole Obermann (2022), Max Lousada (2023), TOKiMONSTA (2023), and Indira Paganotto (2025).

=== Venues ===
In 2007, IMS was held at the Insotel Fenicia Prestige Suites & Spa and Atzaro Agraturismo Hotel, Ibiza.

From 2008 until 2013, IMS was held at the Ibiza Gran Hotel.

From 2014 to 2019, it was held at the Hard Rock Hotel, Ibiza.

In 2020 and 2021, the conference was unable to take place due to the COVID-19 pandemic.

In 2022 and 2023, it was held at the Destino Pacha Ibiza Resort.

In 2024, IMS was held across Mondrian Ibiza and Hyde Ibiza.

=== IMS Dalt Vila ===
The IMS finale, an open air party featuring a night of DJ performances, takes place each year at the top of Dalt Vila, a UNESCO World Heritage Site in Ibiza's old town.

== IMS Business Report ==
The IMS Business Report is an annual study of the electronic music business, consisting of IMS analysis of facts and figures from all aspects of the industry. Presented at IMS each year, the report outlines key cultural trends and major emerging themes of the past year, as well as providing an estimation of the global value of electronic music.

The 2023 report estimated the dance and electronic music market was worth $11.3 billion, having grown by 34% in 2022.

== International editions ==
=== IMS Engage LA ===
IMS Engage was an alternative edition of IMS based in Los Angeles. Founded in 2013, as a one day long summit, it took place each April at the W hotel in Hollywood, running for five years. Speakers from the electronic music industry were paired with prominent figures from film as well as the wider music industry. Speakers included Quincy Jones, David Lynch, Hans Zimmer, Chuck D and P. Diddy.

=== IMS Asia-Pacific ===
IMS Asia-Pacific was the third edition of IMS to be founded, and was based in the Asia-Pacific region, taking place over two days each fall. Launched in 2014, it first took place in Singapore, at the W Hotel, before relocating to Shanghai for 2016 and 2017. The primary focus of IMS Asia-Pacific was on developing the electronic music ecosystem within the Asia-Pacific region, and providing information for how artists could extend their reach into the Asian market.

=== IMS China ===
IMS China was launched in 2015, taking place in Shanghai, forming part of the IMS focus on growth within the Asia-Pacific region, specifically centred around opportunities within China. In 2016 it was merged with IMS Asia-Pacific.

== See also ==
- List of electronic music festivals
- Live electronic music
- Music industry
- Dance music
