= Ibiza Gran Hotel =

Building in Balearic Islands, Spain

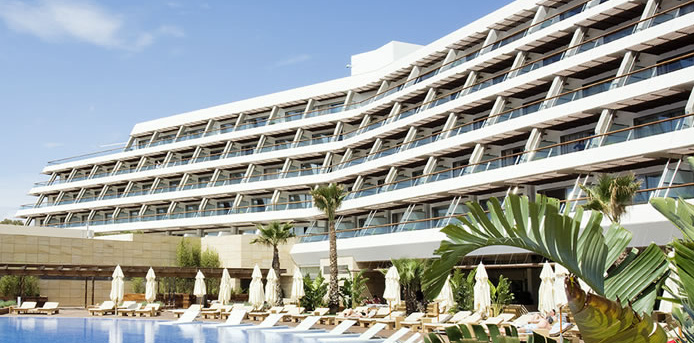
- Poolside, Ibiza Gran Hotel

- Location within Ibiza
- Hotel chain: unknown

General information
- Location: Ibiza Town, Ibiza, Balearic Islands, Spain.
- Coordinates: 38°54′59″N 1°26′31″E

Ibiza Gran Hotel is a luxury five-star hotel in Talamanca, Ibiza. Situated in Ibiza Town, it overlooks the harbour and is surrounded by gardens. The hotel has a five-star restaurant which serves Mediterranean and international cuisine and contains the Casino of Ibiza, a gambling venue. The hotel also has a spa and wellness center, with steam baths, jacuzzi, climatized pool, sauna, and Hammam and suites for private treatments. The hotel regularly hosts conferences and events and has 7 meeting rooms and exposition salons. The Belfast Telegraph notes the grandeur of the lobby, saying that "you could be forgiven for thinking you have stumbled into a modern art museum."

From 2008 until 2013, the International Music Summit was held annually at the hotel.
