= Radio 1's Dance Anthems =

- Genre: Music
- Running time: 180 minutes
- Country of origin: United Kingdom
- Language: English
- Home station: BBC Radio 1 (1997−2007, 2012–present); BBC Radio 1 Dance (2020−present)
- Hosted by: Dave Pearce (1997–2007); Greg James (2012−2018); Danny Howard (2012−2017); MistaJam (2017−2020); Scott Mills (2018−2019); Charlie Hedges (2020−present)
- Original release: 26 July 1997 (except 2007–2012) – present
- Audio format: Stereo
- Opening theme: Only Love by Jacob Plant (2017−2020)
- Website: www.bbc.co.uk/programmes/b01dmw9x

Radio 1's Dance Anthems is a radio show broadcast on BBC Radio 1 from 4pm to 7pm on Saturdays, and on Radio 1 Dance from 4pm to 6pm on weekdays and 4pm to 7pm on weekends. The show, which is currently presented by Charlie Hedges, plays a mix of classic and contemporary dance and electronic tracks and remixes.

== History ==
Radio 1's Dance Anthems is a dance music show on BBC Radio 1, first broadcast on 26 July 1997. It was presented by Dave Pearce and was broadcast until Pearce left the station in August 2007.

In April 2012, Radio 1's Dance Anthems was revived as part of schedule changes to the station. Two shows were broadcast every week: one show was hosted by Greg James on Fridays between 6pm and 7pm, and another show was hosted by Danny Howard on Saturdays between 4pm and 7pm. The Friday show replaced Scott Mills' Ready For The Weekend when James and Mills switched shows, and Howard's Saturday show replaced Reggie Yates' show. Some of the features on Howard's Saturday show were: Danny Howard's "Future Anthem", "Push The Tempo", "All Time Dance Anthems", the "Radio 1 Dance Chart", "Trending Tracks", the "Guest Mix", the "Back 2 Back" mix and the "Victory Dance".

In November 2017, the Saturday show was taken over by MistaJam after Danny Howard started presenting a new Friday night show on BBC Radio 1. MistaJam also took over the Friday show temporarily between October and December 2017, and again between March and May 2018 whilst Greg James was presenting Sounds Like Friday Night.

MistaJam's Saturday show was divided into three parts (from November 2018, these parts were listed as separate shows). The first part, from 4pm to 5pm, played "classic" dance anthems (dance tracks and remixes that were generally more than 3 years old). The second part, from 5pm to 6pm, played "today's" dance anthems (dance tracks and remixes that were less than 18 months old). The third part, from 6pm to 7pm, played "future" dance anthems (recently released dance tracks and remixes). Features in the Future Dance Anthems part included the "Self-Certified Selection", the "R1 Dance Chart", and the "Future Mix". During MistaJam's tenure as presenter of the Saturday show, it became the most listened to on-demand programme on BBC Sounds among the under-35 demographic.

As part of temporary schedule changes from March to August 2020 in the COVID-19 pandemic, the show was extended with one extra hour of classic dance anthems from 3pm to 4pm on Saturdays.

In June 2018, a further schedule change saw Greg James replaced with Scott Mills as presenter of the Friday show. One year later, in July 2019, the Friday show was rebranded Radio 1's Party Anthems.

In October 2020, Charlie Hedges took over as the presenter of Radio 1's Dance Anthems after MistaJam left BBC Radio 1 to join Capital and Capital Dance instead. The parts of the show were also changed at the same time, with two parts of Classic Dance Anthems now running from 4pm to 5pm and from 5pm to 6pm, and one part of Today's Dance Anthems running from 6pm to 7pm. This coincided with the launch of BBC Radio 1 Dance, Radio 1's new BBC Sounds radio stream that plays a mix of back-to-back current, future and classic electronic dance music, simulcasting Saturday's edition of Dance Anthems.

From November 2020 to July 2024, an additional hour of Classic Dance Anthems also streamed from 7pm to 8pm on Radio 1 Dance only.

In June 2024, the corporation announced a new schedule for Radio 1 Dance, set to begin in July 2024. This schedule introduces new and exclusive shows, ahead of the anticipated expansion onto the BBC's DAB+ allocation by the end of 2024. Among the new programming, Charlie Hedges began host Classic Dance Anthems every Sunday to Friday, broadcasting three hours daily on Radio 1 Dance, at 3pm on weekdays and 4pm on weekends. The Saturday show continues to be simulcast with the main Radio 1 network.

== Radio 1 Dance Party Starters ==
Radio 1 Dance Party Starters
- Other names: Radio 1's Party Anthems (2019–2025)
- Genre: Music
- Running time: 60 minutes
- Country of origin: United Kingdom
- Language: English
- Home station: BBC Radio 1 (2019–present); BBC Radio 1 Dance (2025–present)
- Hosted by: Scott Mills (2019−2020); Dev Griffin (2020); Matt Edmondson (2021−2024); Mollie King (2021−2024); Sam MacGregor (2025–present); Danni Diston (2025–present)
- Original release: 5 July 2019 – present
- Audio format: Stereo
- Website: www.bbc.co.uk/programmes/m002jhlr

A spin-off show entitled Radio 1 Dance Party Starters is broadcast on BBC Radio 1 and BBC Radio 1 Dance between 3pm and 4pm on Fridays. It features one hour of feel-good classic and contemporary dance tracks as well as dance remixes of current popular songs.

Radio 1's Party Anthems was created in July 2019 by rebranding the Friday edition of Dance Anthems as part of the introduction of the Radio 1 Anthems series of shows, however the format of the show remained very similar to its predecessor (the only difference being that a small number of classic dance tracks were now played in addition to contemporary dance tracks and remixes). The show was originally presented by Scott Mills and broadcast between 6pm and 7pm on Fridays; however, schedule changes from September 2020 meant that the show moved to an earlier 3pm to 4pm timeslot on Fridays and was now hosted by Dev. In December 2020, Dev left BBC Radio 1 and was replaced as presenter by Matt Edmondson and Mollie King from January 2021 onwards.

From October 2022 until February 2023, Jamie Laing temporarily co-presented with Edmondson whilst King was on maternity leave. Edmondson and King presented their last edition in May 2024 before their move to Monday–Thursday afternoons later that year; the show was hosted by a rotating set of guest presenters for the remainder of 2024 before Sam MacGregor and Danni Diston became permanent presenters in January 2025. The pair's increasing appearances on the weekday Going Home show due to the absence of its regular presenters meant that Party Anthems presenting duties again rotated in the summer months, with Lauren Layfield, Conor Knight, GK Barry, Danny Mylo and Rosie Madison among the hosts.

MacGregor and Diston resuming the slot in September 2025 coincided with a change of the show's name to Radio 1 Dance Party Starters and its simulcast on BBC Radio 1 Dance. Pre-recorded shows with Jess Iszatt presenting are now also broadcast throughout the week on Radio 1 Dance.

Special editions of the programme have aired on New Year's Eve since 2019, presented by Scott Mills (2019), Charlie Hedges (2019, 2022–2023, 2024–2025), Jordan North (2019−2020, 2020−2021, 2021–2022), Arielle Free (2020), James Cusack (2021, 2023, 2024, 2025), Connor Coates (2023, 2024, 2025–2026), Charlie Tee (2022, 2023–2024), Emil Franchi (2025) and Lauren Redfern (2025).
