= Arielle Free =

Scottish radio presenter (born 1986)

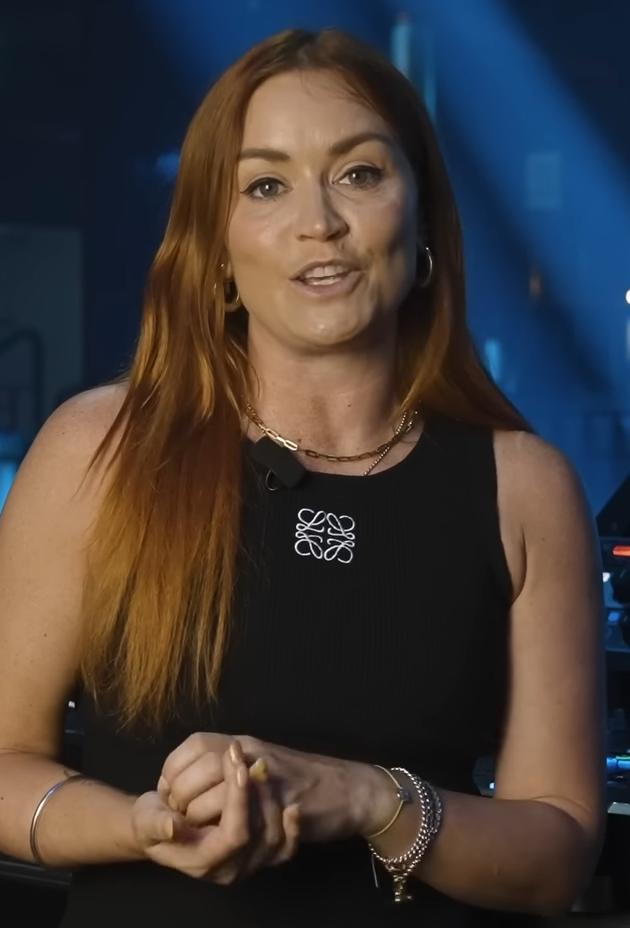
- Free in 2023
- Born: Arielle Free; Stirling, Scotland
- Occupation: Radio presenter
- Employer: BBC
- Known for: House music worldwide
- Height: 5 ft 4 in (1.63 m)
- Website: www.ariellefree.com

Arielle Free is a Scottish DJ and broadcaster. She is known for touring the world as a DJ, music producer, label and club night owner.

On 6 September 2019, Free began presenting the weekend early breakfast show on BBC Radio 1, which included Friday, Saturday, and Sunday mornings. In January 2021, she moved to the weekday early breakfast show from Monday to Thursday.

Free is also the voice of Radio 1's Dance live stream and can be heard on the station 35 hours a week.

As a DJ, Free can often be found playing on Club and Festival bills as well as touring her own club night Free Your Mind. She also has a record label under the same name.

== Early life ==
Free was born in Stirling until moving to Glasgow when she was ten years old. She considers herself to be a Glaswegian. Free began dancing when she was eight years old, and attended the Dance School of Scotland at Knightswood Secondary School.

== Career ==
=== Film and television ===
Free acted in the Beauxbatons scenes in Harry Potter and the Goblet of Fire (2005).

Free presented the children's TV show Scrambled! on ITV. While presenting the show on 3 October 2017, Free took part in a world record attempt for the most limbos achieved by a team of 25 people in three minutes. The team set a record of 142 limbos, verified by the Guinness World Records.

=== Radio and podcasts ===
Free and Kem Cetinay co-presented the official Love Island podcast Love Island: The Morning After from its inception in 2018 until they were replaced by Indiyah Polack and Sam Thompson at the end of the 2022 season.

On 6 September 2019, Free began presenting the weekend early breakfast show on BBC Radio 1, which included Friday, Saturday, and Sunday mornings. In January 2021, she moved to the weekday early breakfast show from Monday to Thursday.

Free is also the voice of Radio 1's Dance live stream and can be heard on the station 35 hours a week.

As a DJ, Free can often be found playing on Club and Festival bills as well as touring her own club night Free Your Mind. She also has a record label under the same name.

On 21 August 2021, Free and Lawrence Chaney, winner of the second series of RuPaul's Drag Race UK, co-hosted a show on BBC Radio 1 in honour of the station's Drag Day.

=== Singles ===
List of singles, with year released
Title	Year
"Soul Full" (featuring Joe Killington)	2022
"Free Your Mind" (featuring Jake Shears)	2023
"Levitate" (with GotSome & Icarus)	2023
"Feels So Good"	2023
"Blow My Mind" (with GHSTGHSTGHST)	2024
Lulu "Shout" (Arielle Free Remix)	2024
Wasabi	2024
"Control" (featuring Be Charlotte)	2024
"Shy" (with Might Delete Later)	2025
"Mind, Body & Soul" (with Tristan Henry)	2025
"Take Me There" (with Nadiah)	2025
"U Get Me High"	2025

=== Comic Relief Challenge ===
On 5 March 2023, Free began the Tour De Dance challenge to raise money for the charity Comic Relief. This was a five-day event where she completed 50 hours of simultaneous cycling and DJing, touring five UK cities. The challenge was completed on a vehicle powered by ten cyclists, with volunteers joining for sections of the journey in York, Leeds, Sheffield, Manchester, and Liverpool.

Over £500,000 was raised for Comic Relief in Free's name by the end of the challenge.
