= BBC Radio 3 Unwind =

British national radio station

- London, Salford and Belfast; United Kingdom
- Broadcast area: United Kingdom
- Frequencies: DAB+: 12B (BBC National DAB); BBC Sounds

Programming
- Language: English
- Format: Classical and meditation
- Network: BBC Radio

Ownership
- Owner: BBC
- Sister stations: BBC Radio 3

History
- First air date: 4 November 2024; 23 months ago

Technical information
- Licensing authority: Ofcom

Links
- Website: Radio 3 Unwind Homepage

BBC Radio 3 Unwind is a British digital radio station, owned and operated by the BBC and run as a spin-off from BBC Radio 3. Launched in 2024, the station plays a wide range of wellbeing and meditation focused classical music both familiar and new, intertwined with voices and soundscapes.

The station broadcasts on DAB+ Digital Radio and BBC Sounds, having originally launched as a online only radio station on BBC Sounds on 4 November 2024 before later launching as a proper digital radio station using DAB+ on 9 September 2025.

== History and launch ==
Reports in 2019 indicated that the BBC was considering launching 'spin-off stations' of its stations to gain more listeners. The first of these was Radio 1 Dance, confirmed by Jonathan Wall, controller of BBC Sounds, in February 2020.

This first 'stream' launched in October 2020. A further music stream launched on BBC Sounds in April 2021, Radio 1 Relax. Radio 1 Relax closed on 24 July 2024.

=== Launch on BBC Sounds ===
In February 2024, the BBC announced plans to launch three new spin-offs, pending public consultation and regulatory approval: one from Radio 1 for “music from the 2000s and 2010s, catering to the appetite from young audiences for recent nostalgia”; one from Radio 2, with “a distinctive take on pop nostalgia’ from the 50s, 60s and 70s”; and one from Radio 3 for “calming classical music”. In addition, Radio 1 Dance would launch on DAB with expanded programming.

Following regulatory approval from Ofcom, the BBC announced in September 2024 that BBC Radio 3 Unwind will be launching on BBC Sounds on Monday 4 November 2024, four days before Radio 1’s Anthems spin-off.

In April 2025, Ofcom indicated provisional approval for the plans to launch Radio 3 Unwind on DAB+.

=== Launch on DAB+ ===
On 2 July 2025, following a formal consultation process, Ofcom approved the plans to launch Radio 3 Unwind on DAB+.

The station subsequently launched on DAB+ in the United Kingdom without prior announcement on 9 September 2025, alongside Radio 1 Dance and Radio 1 Anthems.

The BBC formally confirmed the launch in a press release issued on 12 September 2025, marking what the broadcaster described as a "significant milestone" in its history of its radio stations. The statement noted that Radio 1 Anthems, Radio 1 Dance and Radio 3 Unwind were the first new BBC music radio services since the launch of 1Xtra, 6 Music and Asian Network in 2002. To accommodate the new services, the BBC National DAB multiplex was reconfigured, resulting in a reduction of bitrates for several existing stations.

Radio 3 Unwind was described by the broadcaster as a predominantly meditation focussed classical music service showcasing "classical music to unwind your mind." The station focuses on a wide range of wellbeing and meditation focused classical music both familiar and new than what was played on the main Radio 3 network, with wellbeing focused playlists themed around mental wellbeing, mindfulness, ambience sounds, soothing music and escapist film and TV soundtracks, intertwined with voices and soundscapes.

Original musical idents were composed and produced by Benbrick and recorded by the BBC Concert Orchestra at Maida Vale Studios, providing a distinct sonic identity for the station, with Voiceovers provided by Lenora Crichlow and Ben Arogundade.

== Programming ==
In a February 2024 press release, the BBC announced some of the programming on Radio 3 Unwind. The corporation said the stream "aimed to provide a relaxing classical music experience designed to help listeners unwind and escape daily pressures".

Radio 3 Unwind features a blend of familiar and new classical pieces. It also highlights compositions from living artists, including new UK talent and works from BBC Orchestras and Choirs.

Several production teams from across the UK's audio sector were awarded new shows, ensuring a diverse range of content and creative input.

The commissioned programme makers include Tandem Productions for a daily mid-morning show, Granny Eats Wolf for a soundtracks programme airing Monday to Saturday, Peanut & Crumb for overnight programming, BBC Audio Northern Ireland for a weekly new music show, and BBC Audio London for a daily evening show.

The full schedule includes existing on-demand programmes like the Mindful Mix, artist-led shows such as Ultimate Calm, and simulcast content from Radio 3, including Night Tracks. Additionally, it explores mindfulness and wellbeing themes The Music & Meditation Podcast and The Sleeping Forecast. The extension features around 8,000 tracks per annum.

Additionally, some new commissions include a daily mid-morning show called Classical Unwind with presenter Sian Williams, a soundtracks programme airing Monday to Saturday, a weekly new music show and a daily evening show.

== See also ==
- BBC Radio 1 Dance
- BBC Radio 1 Relax
- BBC Radio 1 Anthems
