= Danny Howard =

British dance music DJ and producer

Danny Howard (born 14 July 1987) is a British dance music producer, DJ, and current host of BBC Radio 1's Dance Party.

== Early life ==
Howard attended Edge Hill University, where he studied sport and exercise science. During his time at Edge Hill, Howard had a residency at the UK's biggest nightclub, The Syndicate, in Blackpool. After his time at university, Howard had a brief stint of playing for Ministry of Sound in Egypt for three months.

== BBC Radio 1 ==
In August 2011, after competing against five others in a series of challenges, Howard won the BBC Radio 1 Superstar DJ.

In April 2012, Howard was offered his own Saturday show on BBC Radio 1: Radio 1's Dance Anthems with Danny Howard."

In 2017, Howard was nominated at the Electronic Music Awards for Radio Show of the Year for BBC's Radio 1 Dance Anthems.

In November 2017, Howard secured a Friday primetime slot on BBC Radio 1, with the show airing from 11 pm - 1 am. MistaJam was announced as the new host of Dance Anthems.

As part of further schedule changes at BBC Radio 1 in 2020, the show was brought forward to 9 pm, with Howard swapping shows with Pete Tong.

From September 2021, Danny Howard took over as host of Radio 1's Dance Party (Fridays, 6 pm - 8 pm), following the departure of Annie Mac.

In addition to Radio 1's Dance Party on Friday evenings, from July 2024, Howard began presenting Radio 1's Dance Party Warm-Up on Thursday evenings exclusively on Radio 1 Dance. The show launched in-line with wider schedule changes on the online-only stream, in preparation for an expected launch on the BBC's existing DAB+ allocation towards the end of 2024.

== Music and DJing ==
On 2 April 2012, Howard released his first single ’Twenty Nine’, on the house music label Spinnin' Records.

In the summer of 2012, Howard played at San Antonio for Judgment Sundays hosted by Judge Jules, playing at both the opening and closing parties. He also played many dates at the BCM club in Magaluf, Mallorca, in June and July.

On 30 June 2012, Howard closed the Xstatic summer festival. In 2012 he played at the Coloursfest in Scotland.

In early January 2013, Howard released his single ‘Apex’ on Spinnin’ Records and also featured in his first music video.

In February 2013, Howard released his debut album, ‘Clubbers Guide 2013’, from Ministry of Sound.

In mid-October 2013, Howard released his latest single, ‘Spire’ on Spinnin' Records.

In October 2013, along with Futuristic Polar Bears, he released "Thundergod" on Carrillo Music.

In April 2016, Danny Howard officially launched his record label, Nothing Else Matters, with former Radio 1 colleague Nigel Harding and RCA Records. It came after he released 99 Soul's ‘The Girl Is Mine’, which topped the UK Dance Chart.

After a year-long hiatus from releasing music, in 2019 Howard launched the ‘next chapter’ of Nothing Else Matters with a collaboration with Eli & Fur. In a tweet, he said that he's “So excited take this label in a new direction of quality underground, straight-up club music. I’m feeling proud to be launching with the amazing Eli & Fur. More music info soon. NEM IS BACK!”.

== Personal life ==
Howard is a supporter of both Leeds United F.C. and Blackpool F.C.
