= Jaguar Bingham =

British disc jockey and radio presenter

- Presenting career
- Show: Introducing Dance
- Station: BBC Radio 1
- Website: https://jaguar-worldwide.com/

Jaguar Bingham (known mononymously as Jaguar) is a British disc jockey and radio presenter who presents on BBC Radio 1 and co-hosts the annual International Music Summit Ibiza.

== Early life ==
Jaguar is half Ghanaian and half English, and grew up on the island of Alderney in the Channel Islands, before going to school in Hampshire from the age of 10.

== Career ==
Jaguar presented on student radio while at university in Leeds. At the age of 19, she started an internship at BBC Radio 1 and 1Xtra. She also had work experience at Mixmag in 2015 and was their weekend editor for two years before hosting the Mixmag's weekly office party The Lab LDN.

At Radio 1, Jaguar works in the BBC Introducing team. In April 2020, she began presenting the Introducing Dance show on Sunday nights, which moved to Thursday nights as part of a wider timetable reshuffle in September 2021. In 2021, Mixmag crowned Jaguar Broadcaster of the year and she won DJ Mag's Best of British Best Radio Show award by public vote. She also launched Future1000, an initiative focused on helping develop the electronic music careers of female, trans, and non-binary applicants of ages 12–18, consisting of a free, 12-part video course introducing them to DJing, music production, and radio hosting. Jaguar launched the weekly dance music podcast UTOPIA Talks in 2021, which focuses on celebrating dance music and examines the various challenges facing the electronic music scene.

In 2022 Jaguar founded the Jaguar Foundation, an organisation created to make electronic music more equitable for marginalised groups. The foundation published their debut report Progressing Gender Representation in UK Dance Music in August 2022.

Since 2022, Jaguar has been the co-host of the International Music Summit Ibiza alongside DJ Pete Tong.

== Personal life ==
Jaguar is queer and lives in East London.
