= BBC Radio 1 Relax =

British national radio station

- Second and final logo, used from 2022 to 2024

London; United Kingdom
- Broadcast area: United Kingdom and internationally via BBC Sounds
- Frequency: BBC Sounds

Programming
- Language: English
- Format: Meditation music
- Network: BBC Radio

Ownership
- Owner: BBC
- Sister stations: BBC Radio 1 BBC Radio 1Xtra; BBC Radio 1 Dance

History
- First air date: 22 April 2021
- Last air date: 24 July 2024

Technical information
- Licensing authority: Ofcom

Links
- Website: Radio 1 Relax Homepage

BBC Radio 1 Relax was a British online-only radio stream, owned and operated by the BBC and ran as a spin-off from BBC Radio 1. The station played a selection of relaxation and well-being focused shows, and broadcast exclusively on BBC Sounds. The stream closed on 24 July 2024, three years after launching.

== History and launch ==
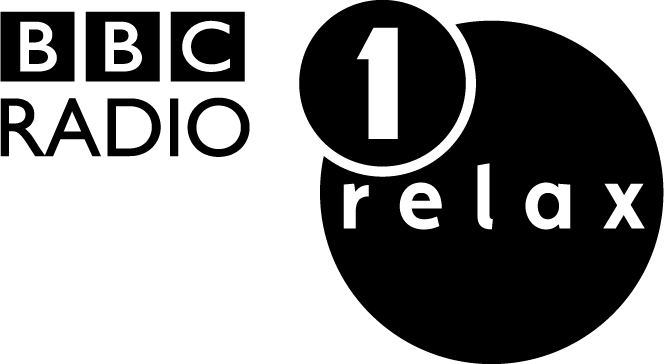
First BBC Radio 1 Relax logo

In September 2020, the BBC announced that a new stream named Radio 1 Dance would launch on BBC Sounds on 9 October 2020, with a four-hour simulcast on Radio 1 and Radio 1 Dance.

As part of the BBC's Annual Plan 2021/22 released in March 2021, the corporation announced plans to launch "a new stream of content to help young audiences, in particular, to manage stress and wellbeing through music and speech content".

Following this, on 22 April 2021, the BBC announced that Radio 1 Relax would launch that evening, coinciding with Earth Day 2021, from 17:00, with Annie Mac and Nick Grimshaw hosting the first hour together, followed by Radio 1's Power Down Playlist at 18:00 and Radio 1's Chillest Show with Sian Eleri at 20:00.

In 2024, the BBC announced the launch of three new digital stations on BBC Sounds and the BBC's existing DAB+ allocation. These include the expansion of sister station Radio 1 Dance which will launch on DAB+, along with new expanded stations for Radio 1, Radio 2 and Radio 3. As part of this announcement, the BBC said it will "stop curating content for its second existing music stream, Radio 1 Relax, which was launched during the pandemic".

As part of Radio 1's Chillest Show on 21 July 2024, Sian Eleri announced that Radio 1 Relax would close on 24 July. She said "it's been a real safe space that we set up in lockdown, [...] it is coming to an end this Wednesday [24 July]. End of an era." Eleri hosted the final show on that day alongside Jess Iszatt on the stream.

== Programming ==
Programming on the stream was repeated wellbeing and relaxation shows from BBC Radio 1 and BBC Sounds.

Radio 1 Relax occasionally simulcasted with Radio 1 on a bank holiday where Stuart Sandeman, Jess Iszatt and Sian Eleri presented the daytime shows (7 am to 6 pm).

Radio 1 regularly adjusted the scheduled programming based on current series across BBC Sounds. Previous series repeated on Radio 1 Relax included Radio 1's Motivate Me Mix, Radio 1 Relax & Chill, Radio 1's Movie Mixtapes with Ali Plumb, Get Set with Radio 1 with Adrienne Adhami, 1Xtra's R&B Chill Mix with Nadia Jae, Gameplay with Baby Queen (from BBC Radio 3) and Tearjerker with Sigrid (from BBC Radio 3).

== See also ==
- BBC Radio 1 Dance
