= Richard Francis (broadcaster) =

British broadcaster and public servant

Sir Richard Francis KCMG
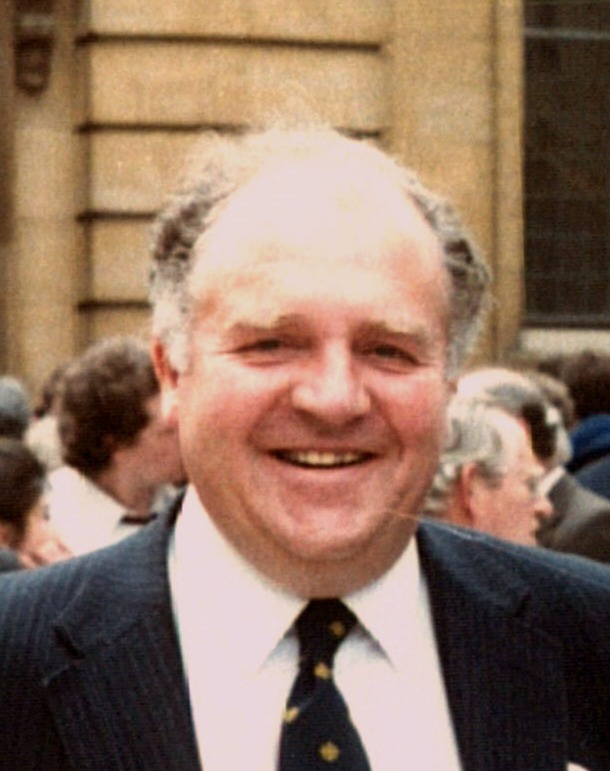
- Richard Francis in 1984
- Born: 10 March 1934; Harrogate, Yorkshire, England
- Died: 26 June 1992 (aged 58); Roehampton
- Education: University College, Oxford
- Occupations: BBC executive; Director-General of British Council
- Years active: 1958–1992
- Employer: British Broadcasting Corporation
- Television: Panorama
- Spouses: Beate Ella Paula Stientje Ohlhagen; Elizabeth Penelope Anne Fairfax-Crone
- Children: 4
- Parents: Eric Roland Francis (father); Esther Joy Todd (mother)

Sir Richard Trevor Langford Francis KCMG (10 March 1934 - 26 June 1992) was a British broadcaster and public servant. His BBC career as director included for Panorama before he was promoted to Controller Northern Ireland and subsequently Director News and Current Affairs and, later, Managing Director BBC radio.

After his dismissal from the BBC, he was appointed Director-General of the British Council.

== Early life and education ==
Richard Francis was born on 10 March 1934 in Harrogate, Yorkshire to Esther Joy Todd and Eric Roland Francis. He was educated at Malsis School and Uppingham School before completing a degree at University College, Oxford.

== Career ==
After two years' service with the Royal Artillery, he joined BBC Television in 1958 and, starting in 1963, was the director of its Panorama programme of current affairs and news. covering many topics including British general elections, the Congo Crisis and the Vietnam War. In 1969, Francis headed the European Broadcasting Union's "Apollo" project which was based at Cape Kennedy and provided support to the television commentators who reported on NASA's Apollo 11 Moon landing. As a result of all his experience, Sir Michael Checkland said he became known as "the man for the big event".

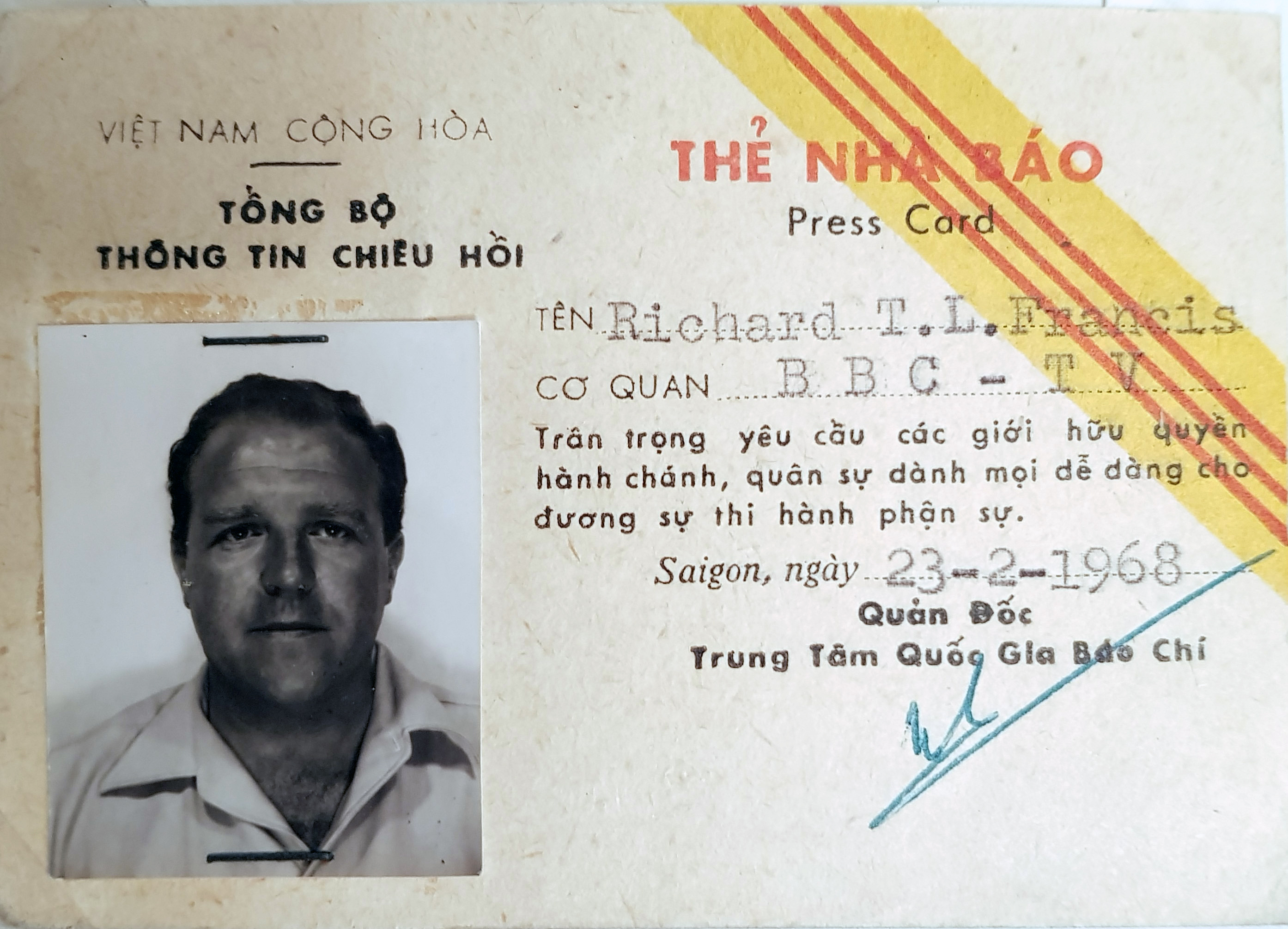
BBC Press pass for Vietnam, 1968

In 1973 he became BBC Controller Northern Ireland, establishing Radio Ulster, and leading the BBC through tumultuous times including a bomb in the BBC's Broadcasting house in Belfast in 1974. Later as BBC Director News and Current Affairs he clashed with Margaret Thatcher over the BBC's coverage of the Falklands War. She had criticised radio and television coverage in which "we and the Argentines are almost being treated as equals". Francis responded at an international Press Institute assembly in Madrid, saying "the BBC needs no lesson in patriotism", and adding that "truth is always the best propaganda".

In 1982, Francis was promoted to be Managing Director BBC radio where he set about giving radio a higher profile. He later clashed with the Director-General, Alisdair Milne, over plans for a new radio centre in Langham Place. According to William Rees-Mogg, who at that time was a member of the BBC's Board of Governors, when asked to give up his job by Milne, Francis complained to the Board, arguing that he had been given no valid reason for dismissal. The Board found itself in the difficult position of having to choose between the two men and decided it was in the BBC's best interests to keep its Director-General. Francis left the BBC in May 1986.

He was appointed Director-General of the British Council, a role in which he set its corporate plans including the 1989 "Britain in Europe" campaign. He remained in this post until his death in 1992, aged 58. He was appointed Knight Commander of the Order of St Michael and St George (KCMG) in 1989.

== Personal life ==
Francis married Beate Ella Paula Stientje Ohlhagen in 1958. They had two sons. After their divorce in 1973, he married Elizabeth Penelope Anne Fairfax-Crone in 1974, with whom he had two further sons. He died at Queen Mary's Hospital, Roehampton, on 26 June 1992.
