= MistaJam =

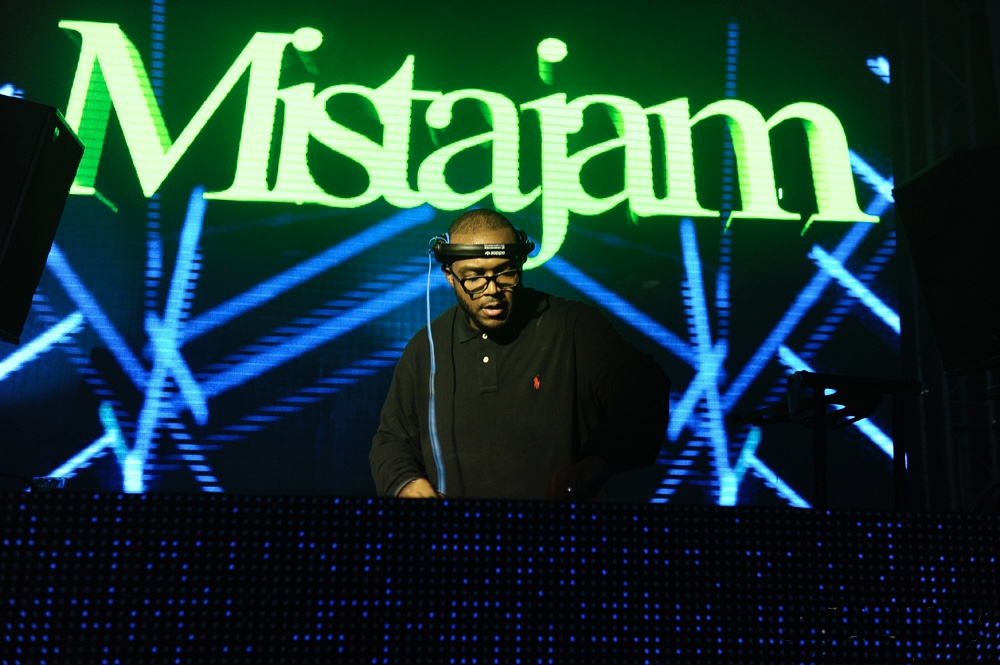
- Peter Dalton performing at Amnesia, 2012

Background information
- Born: Peter Dalton; 19 January 1983 (age 43); Nottingham, England
- Occupations: DJ; radio presenter; actor; music producer
- Website: mistajam.com

Peter Dalton (born 19 January 1983), known professionally as MistaJam, is a British DJ and radio presenter. He is known for presenting radio shows on BBC Radio 1 and BBC Radio 1Xtra from 2005 to 2020; since 2020 he has presented on Capital Dance.

== Early life ==
Born in Nottingham in 1983, MistaJam grew up listening to the records of his parents and began DJing at local events at the age of 14, going on to DJ for Nottingham hip hop crew Out Da Ville and for a local pirate radio station. With associate Joe Buhdha, he ran SureShot Entertainment organising the UK Takeover events.

== Biography ==
He first came to the public's attention as an actor; playing "Minty Sutton" in the 2001 revamp of ITV soap opera Crossroads. He also appeared in the BBC Three sitcom Trexx and Flipside.

In November 2009, he narrated the compilation episode of the BBC Switch series Chartjackers.

His show on BBC Radio 1 was broadcast on Saturday nights between 7 pm – 10pm and was broadcast simultaneously on BBC Radio 1Xtra. Musically, the show was multi genre with a slant towards electronic music and urban music.

His BBC Radio 1Xtra show was broadcast Monday to Thursday between 7pm – 10pm. The show covered the new urban music across a "broad spectrum" of genres represented in 1Xtra's remit and was intended to bridge the gap not only between the mainstream and specialist worlds but also between genres.

MistaJam also featured on a track with Knife Party in 2012, named "Sleaze" which contains MistaJam singing "until they kick us out, until they kick us out, until they kick us out, people move your feet" with audio effects applied to his voice.

Since the end of 2015, he has also been hosting his show on Pitbull's SiriusXM's Globalization Channel 4 (Saturdays 8–10 PM EST/ Sundays 10 am – 12.00 pm EST), spreading his eclectic sound to a global audience for the first time.

On 16 May 2016, MistaJam performed a set live at Victoria Park in Leicester for the victory parade after Leicester City won the Premier League title.

In October 2016, he won the ARIAS Music Broadcaster of the Year award for his BBC Radio 1Xtra show.

On 2 January 2017, MistaJam took over the 7pm – 9pm slot on BBC Radio 1 whilst Annie Mac was on maternity leave, until Mac's return in June 2017.

In November 2017, MistaJam left his evening show and started taking over the BBC Radio 1Xtra drivetime show from Charlie Sloth, who moved on to his Radio 1/1Xtra show The 8th. Mistajam is also on BBC Radio 1's Dance Anthems on Saturdays at 4:00pm.

He appears as the DJ of the fictitious Horizon Block Party radio station in the 2018 racing video game Forza Horizon 4 and its 2021 sequel Forza Horizon 5.

In September 2020, MistaJam left BBC Radio 1 and BBC Radio 1Xtra after 15 years of presenting shows on the stations. Shortly afterwards, on 1 October 2020, MistaJam joined Global to host shows on both Capital and also their new radio station, Capital Dance; Capital Dance launched at 4pm on the day of the announcement. He currently presents the Monday-Saturday drivetime show on Capital Dance from 4–7pm, and formerly "The Capital Weekender" on Fridays and Saturdays from 7–10pm (formerly simulcast on both Capital and Capital Dance. On Capital Dance, it has been replaced by "Club Capital Dance"). He presented his final show on "The Capital Weekender" on 29 June 2024.

== Discography ==
=== Singles ===
Title	Year	Peak chart position	Certifications
Title	Year	UK	Certifications
"Rotate"	2018	—	
"Trust You" (featuring Scott Quinn)	2019	—	
"Ultimatum" (featuring Laura White)	2020	—	
"When"	2020	—	
"Naa Naa"	2020	—	
"Party" (featuring Anelisa Lamola)	2020	—	
"Afro Moon" (with Dean Mickoski)	2020	—	
"Born To Be Wild" (with Arthur Baker)	2021	—	
"Good" (featuring Kelli-Leigh)	2021	—	
"Out of Time"	2021	—	
"Make You Better" (featuring Vula)	2021	—	
"If You Really Love Me (How Will I Know)" (with David Guetta and John Newman)	2021	27	BPI: Gold
"The Recipe"	2021	—	
"Can't Stop Now" (featuring Anelisa Lamola)	2021	—	
"Monday Kind of Tuesday" (with PS1)	2022	—	
"—" denotes a recording that did not chart or was not released in that territory.
