= BBC Radio 1's Big Weekend =

British music festival

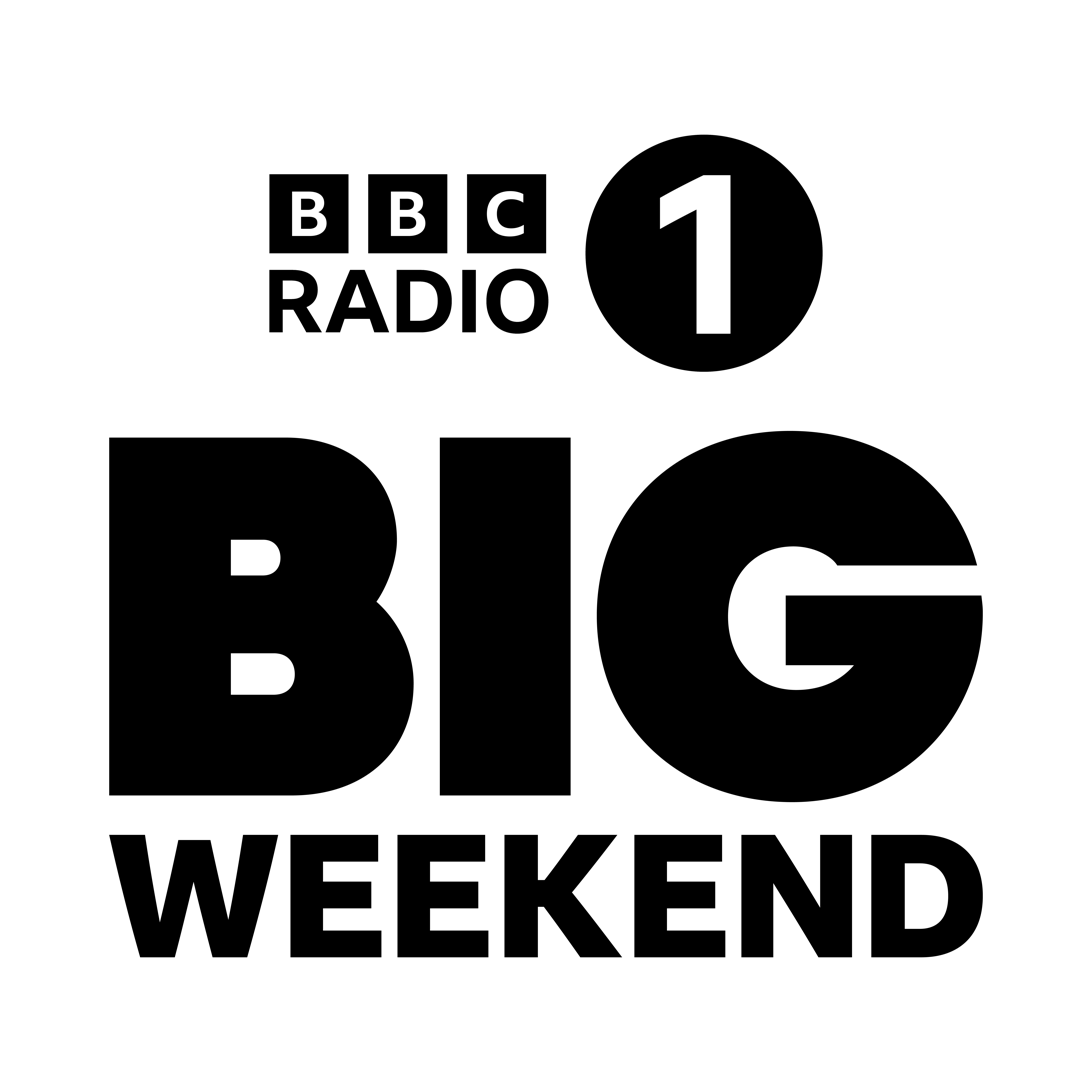
- Big Weekend logo 2026
- Genre: Pop, indie, rock, dance, grime, hip-hop, R&B
- Dates: Varies (last weekend of May, since 2013)
- Location: United Kingdom (touring)
- Years active: 2003–present
- Founders: BBC Radio 1
- Website: Official website

BBC Radio 1's Big Weekend (R1BW) (previously known as One Big Weekend, for 2012 as Radio 1's Hackney Weekend, and for 2018 as BBC Music's Biggest Weekend) is a British music festival run by BBC Radio 1. It is held once a year, in a different location within the United Kingdom each time. It was the biggest free-ticketed music event in Europe, until a fee for tickets was introduced in 2018, and always includes a host of new artists.

== Background and history ==
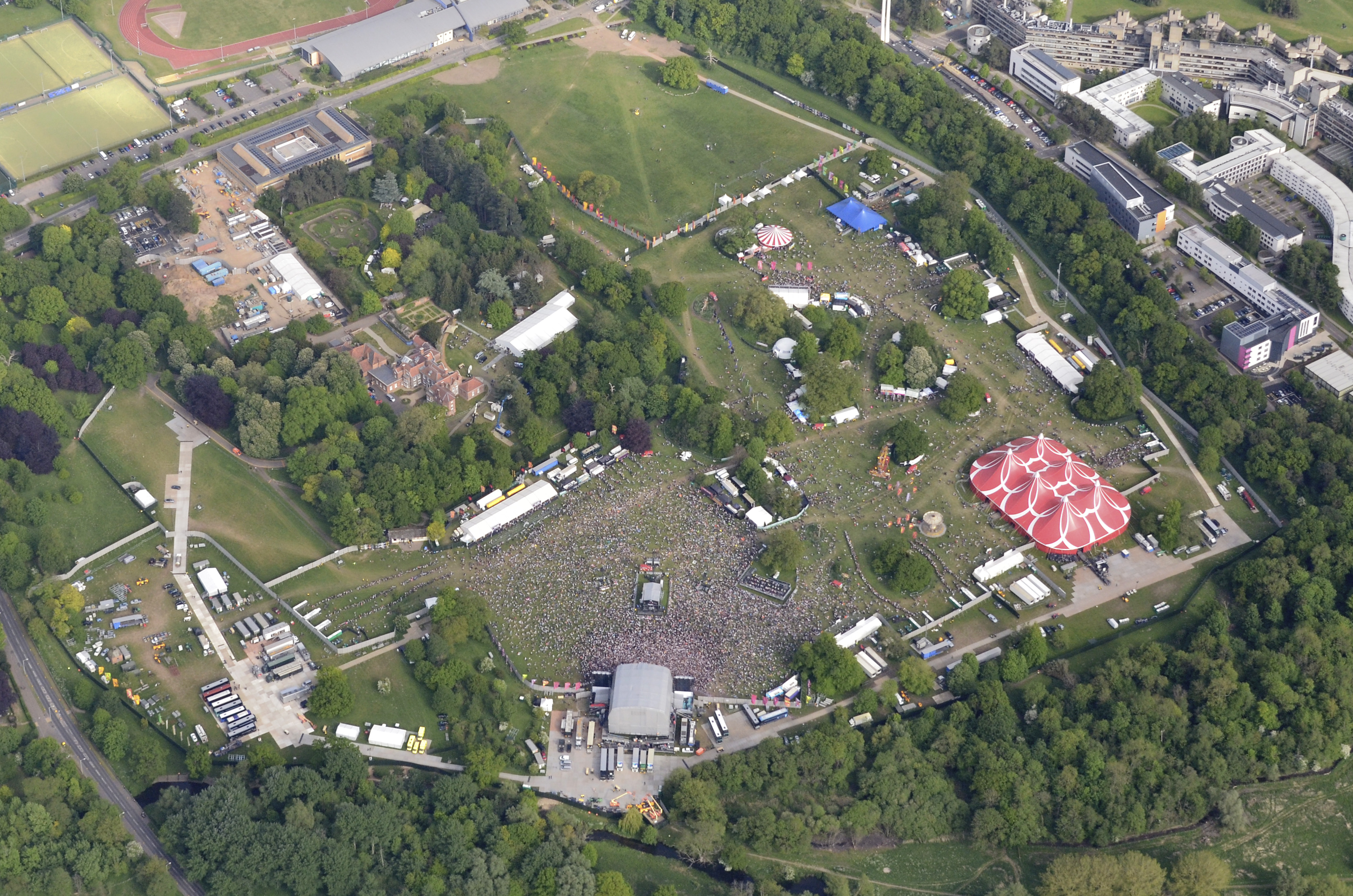
The 2015 event was held in Earlham Park, Norwich

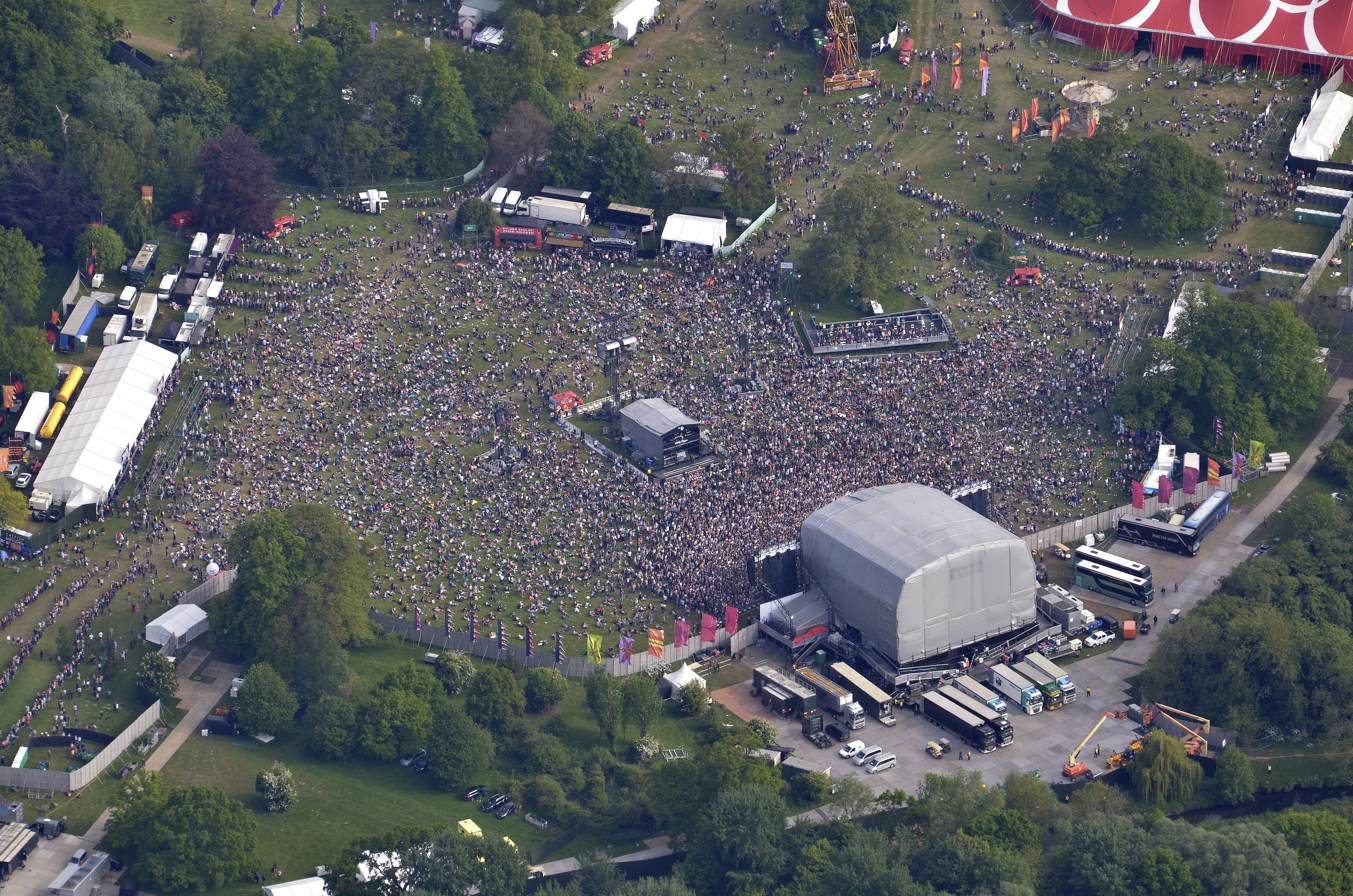
The Main Stage at Radio 1's Big Weekend in Norwich (2015)

The festival is a spin-off of Radio 1's "One Big Sunday", where in each Sunday during the summer months a different town would host the roadshow, usually next to a beach or in a large park. These were also free, but non-ticketed and held from 2000 to 2002. Both events are successors to the Radio 1 Roadshow which toured the country during every summer from 1973 and continued throughout the 1990s.

Originally a "One Big Weekend" would run twice a year, although that last happened in 2004. Since 2005 it has been held once a year instead, usually in May, with the exception of 2012 when a larger festival took place over the weekend of 23–24 June in Hackney, East London.

The form of the event has varied over the years, from one tent at the events in 2003 to as many as six stages in 2012. Every event since 2013 has consisted of one outdoor main stage, one tented second stage, and one much smaller stage dedicated to showcasing emerging talent supported by BBC Introducing. Additionally, the early events dedicated their Saturday exclusively to dance music and their Sunday to bands. The dance day was replaced by a second day of bands from 2006 onwards, although there was a dance-orientated ‘Outdoor Stage’ between 2007 and 2012. The ‘dance day’ was effectively reinstated for the 2013 event in Northern Ireland, with a day of electronic music being held on the Friday night of the weekend. This approach has been repeated in most years since.

The next edition of the event was scheduled to be held between 22 and 24 May 2020 in Dundee, with Camperdown Park becoming the first site to host the event twice. The event however was cancelled in reaction to the COVID-19 pandemic and went virtual. The 2021 Big Weekend was also moved into a virtual mode.

In late 2021, it was revealed that Radio 1's Big Weekend would return in a live tradition for the first time in three years, with Coventry being the host city for this event on 27 to 29 May 2022.

On 30 January 2023, it was announced that Dundee would host Big Weekend from 26 to 28 May 2023. The city was originally due to host in 2020 but it was cancelled due to the COVID-19 pandemic.

On 29 January 2024, it was announced that Luton would host Big Weekend from 24 to 26 May 2024. A full Friday programme took place in Luton, with all stages being used on this day for the first time, although it was still generally based around dance music.

On 28 January 2025, it was announced that Liverpool would host Big Weekend from 23 to 25 May 2025.

== Venues ==
Locations that have hosted Big Weekend.

Venue	Date	Ref(s)
One Big Weekend
Heaton Park, Manchester, England (Note: Saturday cancelled due to adverse weather)	3–4 May 2003	
Coopers Field (within Bute Park), Cardiff, Wales	13–14 September 2003	
Prehen, Derry, County Londonderry, Northern Ireland	24–25 April 2004	
Perry Park, Birmingham, England	18–19 September 2004	
BBC Radio 1's Big Weekend
Herrington Country Park, Sunderland, England	7–8 May 2005	
Camperdown Park, Dundee, Scotland	13–14 May 2006	
Moor Park, Preston, Lancashire, England	19–20 May 2007	
Mote Park, Maidstone, Kent, England	10–11 May 2008	
Lydiard Park, Swindon, Wiltshire, England	9–10 May 2009	
Faenol Estate, Bangor, Gwynedd, Wales	22–23 May 2010	
Carlisle Airport, Carlisle, Cumbria, England	14–15 May 2011	
Hackney Marshes, Hackney, London, England (Note: Held as BBC Radio 1's Hackney Weekend)	23–24 June 2012	
Ebrington Square, Derry, County Londonderry, Northern Ireland	24–26 May 2013	
George Square and Glasgow Green, Glasgow, Scotland	23–25 May 2014	
Earlham Park, Norwich, England	23–24 May 2015	
Powderham Castle, Exeter, England	28–29 May 2016	
Burton Constable Hall, Hull, England	27–28 May 2017	
BBC Music's Biggest Weekend
Titanic Slipways, Belfast, Northern Ireland	25–26 May 2018	
Scone Palace, Perth, Scotland	25–26 May 2018	
Singleton Park, Swansea, Wales	26–27 May 2018	
War Memorial Park, Coventry, England	27–28 May 2018	
BBC Radio 1's Big Weekend
Stewart Park, Middlesbrough, England	24–26 May 2019	
~~Camperdown Park, Dundee, Scotland~~ (Note: Cancelled due to the COVID-19 pandemic but happened virtually instead)	22–24 May 2020	
War Memorial Park, Coventry, England	27–29 May 2022	
Camperdown Park, Dundee, Scotland	26–28 May 2023	
Stockwood Park, Luton, England	24–26 May 2024	
Sefton Park, Liverpool, England	23–25 May 2025	
Herrington Country Park, Sunderland, England	22–24 May 2026	

== Tickets ==
Tickets to the festival are, notably, free (except the small booking fee which was introduced from the 2012 event onwards) but are usually now restricted to one pair per person. Prior to 2006, a ticket booth would be set up in an easy location in the centre of the hosting city, and anybody who wished to obtain a pair of tickets would queue up, before a Radio 1 DJ gave them out (pairs of tickets for the Saturday given away on a Saturday and on the following day for the Sunday), on a first-come first-served basis. The theory there was that the majority of tickets would go to local residents, as people from further away would not make the journey. However, as more and more 'non-local' residents came to the giveaways, and the capacity at the events grew year-on-year, it was decided that a different system was needed. From 2006, therefore, pairs of tickets have been given away through an online lottery. People wishing to attend register on the BBC Radio 1 website and pairs of tickets are then randomly allocated and given out. In order to make sure that those who live locally get the majority of tickets, the applications are split into categories of 'local postcodes' and 'other postcodes' and the majority of the tickets (usually 95%) are reserved for the former.

Despite the tickets being free, some people often attempt to sell them on eBay, and in recent years this has meant that various security measures have been introduced, most notably the barcodes on tickets which are scanned at the gate, the rule that the person whose name is registered on the ticket has to be in attendance and, from 2012, passport-style pictures being required as part of the application process. Tickets are also given away as prizes via various competitions held on Radio 1 (and now 1Xtra) in the weeks running up to the event, which is usually the only way in which members of the public can obtain passes for both days of the event. For the 2013 event, no pre-registration was necessary, and instead all tickets were given away on a 'first come first served' basis - albeit still with the skewing of 90% of tickets being held back for residents of Northern Ireland. After an initial 24-hour delay due to technical difficulties, the tickets all sold out within an hour. 2014's event in Glasgow saw the 'first come first served' ticket release return with no pre-registration needed. 50% of tickets were reserved for residents within the boundaries of Glasgow City Council with a further 45% reserved for those in the rest of Scotland. However, for the first time ever, members of the public could obtain tickets to all three days of the festival. This led to complaints from some disappointed fans who were left without tickets to any day while others bagged tickets for the entire weekend.

For the 2006 event in Dundee, less than half of the tickets were given to local residents, and allegations were made of postal workers stealing tickets.

== 2000s ==
=== May 2003 ===
On 3 and 4 May, the One Big Weekend was held in Manchester.

Saturday 3 May	Sunday 4 May
Judge Jules	The White Stripes
Paul van Dyk	Dirty Vegas
Rob Tissera	Aqualung
Eddie Halliwell	The Coral
Good Greef Crew	Feeder
	Badly Drawn Boy
	Stereophonics

=== September 2003 ===
On 13 and 14 September, the One Big Weekend held in Cardiff.

Saturday 13 September	Sunday 14 September
Basement Jaxx	Pink
The Chemical Brothers	Travis
Erick Morillo	Dido
Seb Fontaine	The Darkness
Lottie and Yousef	Starsailor
Sander Kleinenberg	The Thrills
Hybrid	Kosheen
Time Flies DJ	

=== April 2004 ===
On 24 and 25 April 2004, the first of two in that calendar year - was held at Prehen Fields, Derry. It featured the following line-up:

==== Line-up ====
Saturday 24 April

Main Stage
Faithless
Pete Tong
Seb Fontaine
Judge Jules
Fergie
Armin van Buuren
Agnelli & Nelson
Tall Paul

Sunday 25 April

Main Stage
Keane
Ash
Avril Lavigne
The Streets
Franz Ferdinand
Kelis

=== September 2004 ===
On 18 and 19 September 2004, the final 'One Big Weekend' under that name - and the second of that calendar year - was held at Perry Park, Birmingham. It featured the following line-up:

==== Line-up ====
Saturday 18 September

Main Stage	Second Stage
Tiesto	Groove Armada
Fat Boy Slim	David Guetta
Deep Dish	Darren Emerson
Judge Jules	Xpress 2
Dave Pearce	Yousef
Steve Lawler	Mylo
Nick Fanciulli	Behrouz
	Mutiny
	Josh 'Rinse' Roberts

Sunday 19 September

Main Stage	Second Stage
Lostprophets	Kasabian
Goldie Lookin' Chain	22-20's
Mouldy Lookin' Stain	The Music
Joss Stone	The Departure
Damien Rice	13 Senses
Razorlight	Skinnyman
Estelle	Exist
Natasha Bedingfield	
Broken Dolls	

=== 2005 ===
On 7 and 8 May 2005, the Big Weekend was held at Penshaw Monument in Herrington Country Park, Sunderland, and featured artists included:

==== Line-up ====
Saturday 7 May

Main Stage	Second Stage
Foo Fighters	Mauro Picotto
Kasabian	Pete Tong
Natalie Imbruglia	Judge Jules
Chemical Brothers	Fergie
Battle	Shapeshifters
KT Tunstall	
Rooster
Athlete

Sunday 8 May

Main Stage	Second Stage
The Black Eyed Peas	The Futureheads
Gwen Stefani	Maxïmo Park
Kaiser Chiefs	Interpol
Feeder	The Magic Numbers
Basement Jaxx	The Subways
Jamiroquai	Do Me Bad Things
The Bravery	
Lemar	

=== 2006 ===
In 2006, the Big Weekend was held in Camperdown Park, Dundee on 13 and 14 May 2006 and featured artists which included:

==== Line-up ====
Saturday 13 May

Main Stage	In New Music We Trust Stage
Paolo Nutini	The Fratellis
Corinne Bailey Rae	Mystery Jets
Gnarls Barkley	Boy Kill Boy
Orson	Dirty Pretty Things
Razorlight	Bloc Party
Muse	Primal Scream
The Streets	
Snow Patrol	
Mylo	

Sunday 14 May

Main Stage	In New Music We Trust Stage
The Feeling	The View
The Ordinary Boys	Hot Chip
Sugababes	We Are Scientists
Feeder	Yeah Yeah Yeahs
Editors	The Kooks
Pink	The Zutons
Keane	
Franz Ferdinand (Surprise Guests)	

Many of the BBC Radio 1 DJs including Pete Tong, Tim Westwood and Chris Moyles attended too, and held a number of competitions so that people could win tickets. In addition, Radio 1 also created a virtual festival experience in the virtual reality application Second Life. Avatars on the BBC Radio 1 islands could watch the event on live screens while the audience could see their virtual counterparts on massive stage side screens at the real event in Dundee. The event was hailed as the first ever festival with a professional line-up to take place in a virtual universe.

=== 2007 ===
On Saturday 19 May and Sunday 20 May, Radio 1's Big Weekend was held in Moor Park in Preston.

For the first time in the history of the event, all tickets had barcodes and were scanned on arrival at the park. The barcodes contained information such as name and address of the winner of the tickets. Having the barcodes meant that Radio 1 could cancel lost or stolen tickets and issue new ones to those affected. In an effort to stop people buying tickets from eBay or through other mediums, the public was told they would be asked to prove their home address if their tickets were thought to be suspect. However, the BBC decided to scrap this idea on the day as they thought it would cause angry scenes if people were to be turned away.

At the close of entry on 8 May 2007, over 450,000 people registered for a chance to get tickets for the 2007 festival. On Tuesday 8 May on The Chris Moyles Show, Chris announced that a further 5,000 tickets will be available taking the total for both days being 35,000.

Tickets were also given away in an alternate reality game online using Radio 1 fan forums. The situation surrounded a man called Paul Denchfield who was supposedly sacked from the station. Throughout the run up to the event 'Frozen Indigo Angel' would appear in various places online and on-air, with it being the player's mission to hunt down tickets.

The line up was as follows:

==== Line-up ====
Saturday 19 May

Main Stage	In New Music We Trust Stage	Outdoor Arena
Scissor Sisters	Groove Armada	Westwood
Razorlight	Gossip	MistaJam
Kasabian	LCD Soundsystem	Seamus Haji
The Fratellis	CSS	Meck
The Fray	Biffy Clyro	Groove Armada (DJ Set)
Natasha Bedingfield	Cold War Kids	Judge Jules
The Twang	The Pigeon Detectives	Tim Deluxe vs The Audio Bullys
Jamie T		Simian Mobile Disco
		Annie Mac

Sunday 20 May

Main Stage	In New Music We Trust Stage	Outdoor Arena
Kaiser Chiefs	Bloc Party	Bobby & Nihal
Stereophonics	Maxïmo Park	Rob Da Bank
Mika	Klaxons	Zane Lowe & Mark Ronson
The View	Dizzee Rascal	Klaxons (DJ Set)
Rihanna	Get Cape Wear Cape Fly	Pete Tong & Vernon Kay
Mark Ronson	The Enemy	David Guetta
Just Jack	CSS	Trophy Twins
Calvin Harris	M.I.A	Fergie
		Tylor Leigh
		Dave Pearce

=== 2008 ===
In 2008, the festival was held over the weekend of Saturday 10 May and Sunday 11 May, at Mote Park in Maidstone, which can hold up to 20,000 people. 85% of tickets went to people living in Kent, 10% went to those living in areas bordering Kent, including parts of Sussex, Surrey, Essex and London, and the other 5% were handed to others living across the United Kingdom. Concern was raised after a large number of locals commented that even those living within the close vicinity of the park did not receive tickets, with some in the Medway towns winning multiple times.

==== Line-up ====
The full line-up (except for Paramore) was announced on BBC Radio 1 on Monday 21 April 2008.

Saturday 10 May

Main Stage	In New Music We Trust Stage	Outdoor Stage	BBC Introducing Stage
Madonna	Editors	Fatboy Slim	White Lies
Usher	The Futureheads	Chris Moyles vs Judge Jules	James Yuill
The Fratellis	We Are Scientists	Zane Lowe vs Scott Mills	Magistrates
Scouting for Girls	Foals	Steve Angello & Sebastian Ingrosso	AG Dolla
Duffy	Vampire Weekend	Count & Sinden	Fighting With Wire
The Feeling	Paramore	Dave Spoon	Natty
Robyn	The Ting Tings	Annie Mac	It Hugs Back
The Hoosiers		Nic Fanciulli	Folk Face
		Eddie Halliwell	Jaguar Skills
		Kissy Sell Out	

Sunday 11 May

Main Stage	In New Music We Trust Stage	Outdoor Stage	BBC Introducing Stage
The Kooks	The Raconteurs	Zane Lowe	Golden Silvers
The Enemy	The Zutons	Pendulum (DJ Set)	Twisted Wheel
Nelly (ft. Kelly Rowland)	The Wombats	Justice (DJ Set)	Ebony Bones
Goldfrapp	Hot Chip	Vernon Kay vs Pete Tong	Outl4w
The Pigeon Detectives	Gallows	Dave Pearce	Chipmunk
Newton Faulkner	Pendulum	Basshunter	Kate Goes
OneRepublic	Justice	Rob Da Bank	Tom Williams & The Boat
Adele	Black Kids	Kutski	Wing
		MistaJam	
		Wiley	
		H "Two" O ft. Platnum	
		Jodie Aysha	
		Cameo vs DJ Q	

The national newspapers had also reported that Justin Timberlake could be a special guest - performing with Madonna. Although this later turned out to be untrue. Pendulum were hailed as one of the festivals' best acts, outshining even Madonna and packing the INMWT tent.

- On the main stage on 10 May 2008, Paul Schrader, Chris Carmack and Rachel McAdams appeared whilst doing promotional work for Tarzan.

==== Headline sets ====
Madonna
1. "Candy Shop"
2. "Miles Away"
3. "4 Minutes"
4. "Hung Up"
5. "Give It 2 Me"
6. "Music"

=== 2009 ===
The 2009 event was held in Swindon.

==== Line-up ====
Saturday 9 May

Main Stage	In New Music We Trust Stage	Outdoor Stage
Snow Patrol	Basement Jaxx	Annie Mac
Kasabian	Jack Peñate	Nerm and D-Code
Dizzee Rascal	Doves	Kutski
The Script	Friendly Fires	Pete Tong vs Vernon Kay
Calvin Harris	Deadmau5	2ManyDJs
Chris Moyles	Florence and the Machine	Zane Lowe
The Wombats	The King Blues	Rob da Bank
Daniel Merriweather	Fightstar	Tim Westwood
The Saturdays		

Sunday 10 May

Main Stage	In New Music We Trust Stage	Outdoor Stage
The Prodigy	The Enemy	Judge Jules
Lily Allen	Maxïmo Park	Jaymo and Andy George
Ne-Yo	Gossip	Kissy Sell Out
Franz Ferdinand	Enter Shikari	Chase & Status (DJ set)
Akon	Tinchy Stryder	David Guetta featuring Kelly Rowland
Scouting for Girls	Chase & Status	Chris Moyles vs Tim Westwood
Alesha Dixon	Ladyhawke	Fabio & Grooverider
N-Dubz	White Lies	BBC Radio 1Xtra - MistaJam featuring Wiley, Skepta, Bashy, Chipmunk and Doneao
	Little Man Tate	Trevor Nelson and Jaguar Skills

== 2010s ==
=== 2010 ===
On 24 February 2010, it was announced on The Chris Moyles Show that the 10th Big Weekend would take place on the Faenol Estate near Bangor, Wales on Saturday 22 May and Sunday 23 May 2010. Pixie Lott also performed on the show and was announced as the first act on the bill and Lostprophets was announced while they were on tour. Jaguar Skills announced on his website that he would be playing at the event, but he was not on the announced line-up. On the morning of 26 April 2010, the full main stage and INMWT stage listings were announced during the Fearne Cotton Show (which was hosted by Annie Mac, as Cotton was on vacation).

20,000 pairs of free tickets were made available to the public for each day of the weekend. Applicants were able to register for tickets to the event on the Radio 1 website from 26 April 2010 until 3 May 2010.

==== Line-up ====
Saturday 22 May

Main Stage	In New Music We Trust Stage	BBC Introducing Stage	Outdoor Stage
Florence & The Machine	Faithless	Frankie & The Heartstrings	Westwood + Kelly Rowland
Dizzee Rascal	MGMT	The Joy Formidable	Target & Cameo + Roll Deep
Alicia Keys	Ellie Goulding	What Would Jesus Drive?	Ras & Seani B + Chiddy Bang & Skepta
Lostprophets	Tinie Tempah	Menis	MistaJam + Professor Green, Blame & Wiley
Cheryl Cole	Bombay Bicycle Club	I Am Austin	Pete Tong vs Vernon Kay
Chipmunk	Hadouken!	The Wonder Villains	Faithless DJs
Thirty Seconds to Mars	Stornoway	Alan Pownall	Zane Lowe
Justin Bieber	Example	Y Promatics	Rob da Bank
Scouting For Girls		Pegasus Bridge	Toddla T & Alex Metric
			Annie Mac

Sunday 23 May

Main Stage	In New Music We Trust Stage	BBC Introducing Stage	Outdoor Stage
Pendulum	Vampire Weekend	Beatbullyz	Westwood + Scorcher
Rihanna	You Me At Six	Envy	Semtex & Robbo Ranx
Biffy Clyro	Sub Focus	Tempa T	Bailey & Fabio
Kesha	Plan B	UTE	Rampage & MistaJam + Devlin & McLean
JLS	Marina & The Diamonds	My Tiger My Timing	Chris Moyles vs Westwood
Paramore	Crystal Castles	Pete Lawrie	Tiesto
Jason Derulo	Kids In Glass Houses	We Are Animal	Judge Jules
Paolo Nutini	Delphic	Django Django	Jaymo & Andy George
Pixie Lott		Yr Ods	Kissy Sell Out
			Huw Stephens

Live Lounge Tent

Diana Vickers
Ellie Goulding
Lostprophets
Joe McElderry
Florence and the Machine
Example
Biffy Clyro
Taio Cruz
Kate Nash

==== Headline sets ====
Florence and the Machine
1. "Dog Days Are Over"
2. "Halo" (Beyoncé cover)
3. "Howl"
4. "Kiss with a Fist"
5. "Between Two Lungs"
6. "Drumming Song"
7. "Rabbit Heart (Raise It Up)"
8. "Cosmic Love"
9. "You Got the Dirtee Love" (with Dizzee Rascal)
Rihanna
1. "Hard"
2. "Disturbia"
3. "Rude Boy"
4. "Te Amo"
5. "Russian Roulette"
6. "Don't Stop the Music"
7. "SOS"
8. "Umbrella"

=== 2011 ===
The announcement of location and dates for Radio 1's Big Weekend 2011 was made by Scott Mills on 30 March 2011, with his breakfast show (he was covering for Chris Moyles that week) being broadcast from Trinity School, Carlisle that morning. Over 750,000 people applied for tickets to the event.

20,000 pairs of tickets were available for the two-day event with the usual allocation policy applying. It was announced that the priority areas for tickets would be the borders of Carlisle, Cumbria, the Scottish Borders and the North East of England.

As usual, competitions to win VIP tickets were run on various Radio 1 shows in the weeks leading up to the Big Weekend.

==== Line-up ====
Line-up
Saturday 14 May	Sunday 15 May
Main Stage
Foo Fighters; The Black Eyed Peas; Tinie Tempah; Chase & Status; Nicole Scherzinger; Plan B Ellie Goulding; Jessie J Arctic Monkeys	Lady Gaga; My Chemical Romance; Taio Cruz; The Script; Katy B Professor Green; Olly Murs; The Wombats; Bruno Mars
In New Music We Trust Stage
Swedish House Mafia; Friendly Fires; Nero; Panic! at the Disco; Everything Everything; Cage the Elephant; The Joy Formidable; Wretch 32	The Strokes; Magnetic Man; Noah and the Whale; Devlin; Two Door Cinema Club; The Vaccines; Yasmin; Pulled Apart By Horses
BBC Introducing Stage
Friends Electric; Aaron Delahuntly; Rizzle Kicks; Yaaks; Luke Bingham; Fiona Clayton; Saturday Night Gym Club; Baron Van Alias; Birds vs Planes	MOPP; MyElectrik; Masters in France; DJ Vimto vs Jah Digga; Linc; Polarsets; Among Brothers; Let's Buy Happiness; Colt 45
Outdoor Stage
Zane Lowe; Jaymo and Andy George; Judge Jules; Pete Tong; Riva Starr; Pete Tong vs Vernon Kay; Rob da Bank; MistaJam; Annie Mac vs. Nick Grimshaw; Target; Cameo; Westwood	Skream and Benga; Annie Mac; Toddla T Fabio and Grooverider; Kutski; Kissy Sell Out; Calvin Harris; Westwood vs. Moyles; Jaguar Skills; Zane vs. Fearne; Dev; DJ Semtex; Westwood

==== Headline sets ====
Foo Fighters
1. "Bridge Burning"
2. "Rope"
3. "All My Life"
4. "My Hero"
5. "Learn to Fly"
6. "White Limo"
7. "Times Like These"
8. "The Pretender"
9. "Walk"
10. "Cold Day in the Sun"
11. "Best of You"
12. "Monkey Wrench"
13. "Everlong"
14. "This Is a Call"
15. "Tie Your Mother Down"
Lady Gaga
1. "Born this Way"
2. "Bad Romance"
3. "Telephone" / "Poker Face" / "Alejandro"
4. "Orange Colored Sky"
5. "Speechless"
6. "The Edge of Glory"
7. "You and I"
8. "Americano"
9. "Just Dance"
10. "Judas"

==== TV & radio coverage ====
Radio 1's Big Weekend 2011 was streamed live on the Radio 1 website. The headliners of each day (Foo Fighters and Lady Gaga on Saturday and Sunday respectively) were broadcast live on BBC Three and BBC HD. The Big Weekend was also broadcast live on BBC Radio 1. Highlights of the event were also broadcast on BBC Three and BBC HD during the week following the Big Weekend.

=== 2012 ===
On 23 May 2011, it was announced that for 2012, Radio 1 would be replacing the Big Weekend with a 'Hackney Weekend' to form part of the London 2012 Festival, in the buildup to the 2012 Olympics. The festival duly took place on the Hackney Marshes over the weekend of 23 and 24 June 2012.

50,000 people attended each of the two days in 2012, meaning a total of 100,000 people visited the site over the weekend: more than double the previous highest attendances (40,000 across the weekends in each of 2010 and 2011). Due to the upgraded scale of the festival, the number of stages were increased (from four to six) and, for the first time, the Main Stage was outdoors rather than inside a tent.

Florence + The Machine were initially announced as playing on Saturday 23 June, but a double booking at another European festival meant that they actually performed on Sunday 24 June.

The Ting Tings were initially announced as to be playing on Saturday 23 June, but due to logistical reasons beyond their control they had to pull out of the bill.

On both days of the festival, a number of unannounced special guests performed with artists on the bill, the most noteworthy of which were Rihanna, M.I.A. and Kanye West appearing as part of Jay-Z's headlining set on Saturday; and, in turn, Jay-Z went on to return the favour and make a special multiple-song contribution during Rihanna's own headlining set the next day.

==== Line-up ====
Saturday 23 June

Line-up
Saturday 23 June	Sunday 24 June
Main Stage
Jay-Z; Kasabian; Nicki Minaj; Ed Sheeran; Example; Rizzle Kicks; Leona Lewis	Rihanna; Dizzee Rascal; Florence and the Machine; Tinie Tempah; Jessie J Plan B Professor Green
In New Music We Trust Stage
Jack White; Lostprophets; The Vaccines; The Maccabees; Rudimental; Delilah; Michael Kiwanuka; Rita Ora; Jessie Ware	Chase & Status; Magnetic Man; Lana Del Rey; Enter Shikari; Sub Focus; Ben Howard; Santigold; Bombay Bicycle Club
1Xtra Arena
Sean Paul; Flo Rida will.i.am D'banj; Trey Songz; Tinchy Stryder; Chip; Boy Better Know; DJ Fresh; Emeli Sandé; Dappy	Nas; Wretch 32; B.o.B; Gyptian; Taio Cruz; Azealia Banks; Maverick Sabre; Devlin; Sway; Lethal B Mindless Behavior; Labrinth
Dance Arena
Swedish House Mafia; Deadmau5; Calvin Harris; Eric Prydz; Nero; Annie Mac	David Guetta; Andy C Madeon; Pete Tong; Flux Pavilion & Doctor P Zane Lowe
DJ Stage
Nihal; Robbo Ranx; Semtex; Benji B Mosca; Rob da Bank; Moyles vs Westwood; DJ Target; DJ Cameo; Tim Westwood	DJ Edu; Nihal; Robbo Ranx; Toddla T Friction; B.Traits; Skream & Benga; Vernon vs Charlie Sloth; MistaJam; Tim Westwood
BBC Introducing Stage
Random Impulse; The Skints; In Search Of; Isaac Danquah; Lil Simz; My Panda Shall Fly; Paigey Cakey; Cheekie Bugga; UD Vocal Collective; Xploder	Arthur Beatrice; Driving Lolita; Joe Black; Kersha Bailey; Lola King and The Kickstarts; Pepstar; Project Hackney Collective; Savages; Stevie Neale; ShezAr

==== Headline sets ====
Jay-Z
1. "Run This Town" (with Rihanna)
2. "Dirt off Your Shoulder"
3. "I Just Wanna Love U (Give It 2 Me)"
4. "PSA"
5. "Where I'm From"
6. "Jigga What, Jigga Who"
7. "U Don't Know"
8. "99 Problems"
9. "'03 Bonnie & Clyde"
10. "Girls, Girls, Girls"
11. "On to The Next One"
12. "Dead Presidents"
13. "Swagga Like You"
14. "Paper Planes" - Performed by M.I.A.
15. "Bad Girls" - Performed by M.I.A
16. "Izzo (H.O.V.A)"
17. "Empire State of Mind"
18. "Otis" (featuring Kanye West)
19. "Gotta Have It" (featuring Kanye West)
20. "Who Gon Stop What?" (featuring Kanye West)
21. "No Church in the Wild" (featuring Kanye West)
22. "Lift Off" (featuring Kanye West)
23. "Niggas in Paris" (featuring Kanye West)
Rihanna
1. "Only Girl (In the World)"
2. "Disturbia"
3. "S&M"
4. "Cockiness (Love It)"
5. "Birthday Cake"
6. "What's My Name"
7. "Rude Boy"
8. "Love the Way You Lie (Part II)"
9. "Man Down"
10. "Where Have You Been"
11. "Wait Your Turn"
12. "Hard"
13. "Don't Stop the Music"
14. "Run This Town" (featuring Jay-Z)
15. "Talk That Talk" (featuring Jay-Z)
16. "Umbrella" (featuring Jay-Z)
17. "We Found Love"

=== 2013 ===
The new Radio 1 Breakfast Show host Nick Grimshaw announced that the Big Weekend would return to Derry in May 2013 to celebrate its title of UK City of Culture 2013, the same city that hosted the first of the two 2004 Big Weekends (although the actual site is different). For the first time, the Big Weekend extended to a third day - which focused on dance music. Alongside that initial announcement were the confirmation of the first two acts, Olly Murs and Two Door Cinema Club, with the rest of the line-up being announced by Grimshaw during another Radio 1 Breakfast Show on Monday 6 May. Both of the stages were in Ebrington Square - unlike recent Big Weekends there was no BBC Introducing Stage or Live Lounge Tent at this event. The '1Xtra' and 'In New Music We Trust' stages from Hackney 2012 were combined into a single venue.

==== Line-up ====
Line-up
Friday 24 May	Saturday 25 May	Sunday 26 May
Main Stage
	Biffy Clyro; The Vaccines; Two Door Cinema Club; Labrinth; Foals; Ellie Goulding; Conor Maynard; The Saturdays	Bruno Mars; Paramore; Thirty Seconds to Mars; The Script; Olly Murs; Jake Bugg; Wretch 32; Little Mix
1Xtra Arena/In New Music We Trust Stage
Rita Ora; A$AP Rocky; J. Cole; Wiley; Maverick Sabre; Katy B AlunaGeorge; Angel Haze	DJ Fresh; Kendrick Lamar alt-J; Bring Me the Horizon; The 1975; Iggy Azalea; Kodaline; Laura Mvula; Frightened Rabbit	Vampire Weekend; Disclosure; Bastille; Macklemore & Ryan Lewis; Everything Everything; Jessie Ware; Miles Kane; We Are The Ocean; HAIM

- Due to issues at Heathrow Airport, two acts on the bill for Friday were unable to attend the event: those being Angel Haze and AlunaGeorge. Further acts also had their performances affected by the flight disruptions but were still able to appear: J. Cole was forced to substitute his band for a backing track, and Rudimental's equipment was stuck in London, forcing them to use the equipment of Chase and Status.
- The above tables do not always represent the stage orders - for example, Two Door Cinema Club opened the Main Stage on Saturday, as opposed to The Saturdays, who in fact performed second on the day. Similarly, 30 Seconds To Mars opened the Main Stage on Sunday.

==== Headline sets ====
Calvin Harris
1. "Spectrum"
2. "Awooga"
3. "We Are Your Friends"
4. "Reload"
5. "Flashback"
6. "Bounce"
7. "Monkey See Monkey Do"
8. "Drinking From The Bottle"
9. "Here We Fucking Go"
10. "We Found Love"
11. "Be Strong"
12. "Ladi Dadi"
13. "You Got The Love"
14. "Yeahhh"
15. "In My Mind"
16. "We'll Be Coming Back"
17. "Epic"
18. "Feel So Close"
19. "Metropolis"
20. "Promises" (cover of Nero)
21. "Move"
22. "Rage"
23. "Need U 100%" (cover of Duke Dumont)
24. "Million Voices"
25. "Turn It Up"
26. "I Need Your Love"
27. "One More Time" (cover of Daft Punk)
28. "Sweet Nothing"
29. "Bura"
30. "Let's Go"
Rita Ora
1. "Radioactive"
2. "Facemelt"
3. "Love and War"
4. "Hot Right Now"
5. "Shine Ya Light"
6. "Roc the Life"
7. "Hella Good"
8. "She Wants To Move"
9. "How We Do (Party)"
10. "R.I.P."
Biffy Clyro
1. "Stingin' Belle"
2. "The Captain"
3. "Living Is A Problem Because Everything Dies"
4. "Biblical"
5. "Sounds Like Balloons"
6. "God & Satan"
7. "Who's Got A Match?"
8. "Bubbles"
9. "Spanish Radio"
10. "Opposite"
11. "Glitter and Trauma"
12. ""Many of Horror"
13. "That Golden Rule"
14. "Black Chandelier"
15. "Mountains"
DJ Fresh
1. "The Feeling"
2. "Gold Dust"
3. "Talkbox"
4. "Hypercaine"
5. "Levels" (cover of Avicii)
6. "Hip Hop"
7. "Paradise" (cover of Coldplay)
8. "Lassitude"
9. "Seven Nation Army" (cover of The White Stripes)
10. "The Power"
11. "Fire Over Water"
12. "Hot Right Now"
13. "The Edge"
14. "Skyhighatrist"
15. "Forever More"
16. "Louder"
Bruno Mars
1. "Locked Out Of Heaven"
2. "Natalie"
3. "Treasure"
4. "Marry You"
5. "Runaway Baby"
6. "When I Was Your Man"
7. "Grenade"
8. "Just The Way You Are"
Vampire Weekend
1. "Cousins"
2. "White Sky"
3. "Cape Cod Kwassa Kwassa"
4. "Diane Young"
5. "Step"
6. "Holiday"
7. "Unbelievers"
8. "Everlasting Arms"
9. "A-Punk"
10. "Ya Hey"
11. "Campus"
12. "Oxford Comma"
13. "Giving Up the Gun"
14. "Walcott"

=== 2014 ===
On 30 January, Nick Grimshaw, Rita Ora and Paolo Nutini announced that the 2014 event would be held in Glasgow to celebrate the 2014 Commonwealth Games. For the first time, the event took place in two different locations in the same city. The Friday night of the event was held in George Square and was dedicated to dance music. The remaining two days followed the traditional format of the Big Weekend and took place at Glasgow Green. Coldplay, Rita Ora, Paolo Nutini, Pharrell Williams and The 1975 performed. On 31 March, 60,000 weekend tickets for the event sold out in 30 minutes. The Main Stage lineup was announced on the Radio 1 Breakfast Show on 28 April 2014. It was announced that Katy Perry would headline on the Sunday night while One Direction and Kings of Leon would open the Main Stage on the Saturday and Sunday respectively. Local Scottish band Baby Stange performed on the BBC Introducing Stage.

==== Line-up ====
Line-up
Friday 23 May	Saturday 24 May	Sunday 25 May
George Square Stage	Main Stage	
Tiësto; Martin Garrix; Pete Tong; Zane Lowe; Annie Mac; Danny Howard	Coldplay; Calvin Harris; Ed Sheeran; Lily Allen; Jake Bugg; Pharrell Williams; Bastille; One Direction	Katy Perry; Paolo Nutini; Tinie Tempah; The 1975; Rita Ora; John Newman; The Vamps; Kings of Leon
Tiësto; Martin Garrix; Pete Tong; Zane Lowe; Annie Mac; Danny Howard	In New Music We Trust Stage	
Tiësto; Martin Garrix; Pete Tong; Zane Lowe; Annie Mac; Danny Howard	Example; Clean Bandit; Lorde; Bombay Bicycle Club; Katy B Twin Atlantic; Wilkinson; The Kooks	Kasabian; Sub Focus; You Me at Six; London Grammar; Sam Smith; Chvrches; Klaxons; Gorgon City
Tiësto; Martin Garrix; Pete Tong; Zane Lowe; Annie Mac; Danny Howard	BBC Introducing Stage	
Tiësto; Martin Garrix; Pete Tong; Zane Lowe; Annie Mac; Danny Howard	Catfish and the Bottlemen; Honeyblood; XO; Darlia; A-L-X; KARI; Lyger; Saint Raymond; Sega Bodega; Coasts; Model Aeroplanes; Racing Glaciers	Indiana; Little Shoes Big Voice; RHODES; Shy Nature; Leon Else; MDNGHT; Royal Blood; Baby Strange; Juce; Rosie Lowe; Algernon Doll

==== Headline sets ====
Coldplay
1. "Paradise"
2. "Charlie Brown"
3. "Magic"
4. "Yellow"
5. "Clocks"
6. "Every Teardrop is a Waterfall"
7. "True Love"
8. "Viva la Vida"
9. "Oceans"
10. "A Sky Full of Stars"

Encore

11. "Fix You"
Katy Perry
1. "Roar"
2. "Part of Me"
3. "Wide Awake"
4. "Dark Horse"
5. "I Kissed a Girl"
6. "The One That Got Away" (with small excerpts of "Thinking of You")
7. "Unconditionally"
8. "Walking on Air"
9. "Teenage Dream"
10. "California Gurls"
11. "Birthday"

Encore

12. "Firework"

=== 2015 ===
On 23 January, Nick Grimshaw announced on the Radio 1 Breakfast Show, that the 2015 event would be held at Earlham Park in Norwich, Norfolk, next to the University of East Anglia, taking place on Saturday 23 and Sunday 24 May. On 31 March, 50,000 tickets went on sale and sold out within 40 minutes. The full lineup for main stage and the INMWT tent was announced on 20 April, Muse headlined on the Saturday and Foo Fighters on the Sunday. The majority of acts for the BBC introducing stage were announced on 22 April with the remaining acts announced on 4 May.

==== Line-up ====
Line-up
Saturday 23 May	Sunday 24 May
Main Stage
Muse; Florence and the Machine; David Guetta; Fall Out Boy; Ben Howard; Charli XCX; The Vaccines; 5 Seconds of Summer	Foo Fighters; Taylor Swift; George Ezra; Imagine Dragons; Rita Ora; Catfish and the Bottlemen; Clean Bandit; Olly Murs
In New Music We Trust Stage
Rudimental; Jess Glynne; Hozier; Years & Years; Circa Waves; Ella Eyre; Mallory Knox; Snoop Dogg; Slaves	Jamie T Alt-J; Sigma; James Bay; Jungle; Lethal Bizzle; SOAK; Raury; Lower Than Atlantis
BBC Introducing Stage
Port Isla; Laurel; HUNTAR; Context; Ted Zed; Fickle Friends; Amber-Simone; Get Inuit; Ruen Brothers; KLOE; The Hearts; Kill It Kid	Laura Doggett; Star.One; Honne; Hot Cops; Formation; Will Robert; Harry Edwards; Best Friends; Cash+David; Franko Fraize; Youth Club; Claws

- Due to their vocal cord operation, Sam Smith's performance on Sunday was cancelled and replaced by Catfish and the Bottlemen.

=== 2016 ===
The event was held in Powderham Castle, Kenton near Exeter on 28 and 29 May. Coldplay headlined the second and final night, with other acts performing including Bring Me the Horizon, Chase & Status, Ellie Goulding and Craig David. On 1 March, it was announced that The 1975 and Jake Bugg had been added to the lineup. Ticket information was announced on Monday 21 March. Tickets went on sale at 8 am on Monday 4 April. As usual, the tickets themselves were free, but there was an £8.50 administration fee with each ticket. In 2016, 60% of the tickets were reserved for residents living in areas covered by Exeter City Council and Teignbridge district council. A further 35% went to residents in surrounding areas of Exeter, including those with any other Exeter (EX) and Torquay (TQ) postcodes and those with Truro (TR), Plymouth (PL), Taunton (TA) and Dorchester (DT) postcodes, whilst the remaining 5% of tickets were available to the rest of the UK. The full line-up was announced in April 2016.

==== Line-up ====
Line-up
Saturday 28 May	Sunday 29 May
Main Stage
Mumford & Sons; Chase & Status; Bastille; Jess Glynne; Jake Bugg; Sigma; Meghan Trainor; Tom Odell; Nick Jonas	Coldplay; The Weeknd; Ellie Goulding; The 1975; Iggy Azalea; Years & Years; Catfish and the Bottlemen; Kygo; OneRepublic
In New Music We Trust
Bring Me the Horizon; Fetty Wap; Tame Impala; CHVRCHES; Stormzy; Flume; Twenty One Pilots; Craig David	Biffy Clyro; Alesso; The Last Shadow Puppets; Skepta; Wolf Alice; Jack Garratt; Alessia Cara; Panic! at the Disco
BBC Introducing Stage
Tiny Folds; Louis Berry; Declan McKenna; Wolfie; Cortes; Rosie Lowe; Jealous of the Birds; Barns Courtney; The Hunna; Spring King; Shannon Saunders; Reuel Elijah	Catholic Action; Blossoms; Emmi; Black Foxxes; Vital; KYKO; Alice Jemima; Tobi Sunmola; Yonaka; Izzy Bizu; BB Diamond; James Cherry

==== Controversies ====
Twenty One Pilots had their set cut short due to "safety concerns". Frontman Tyler Joseph climbed a mast whilst singing "Car Radio", which prompted BBC officials to appear and cut his microphone off, and ask bandmate Josh Dun to stop drumming. They could not continue with their set and had to leave the stage.

=== 2017 ===
For 2017, the event was held at Burton Constable Hall approximately 9 miles (14 km) north-east of Hull. The location was confirmed the morning of 23 January, acts confirmed include Kings of Leon, Little Mix and Stormzy. On 16 March 2017, it was announced Katy Perry will be headlining the Saturday night.

==== Line-up ====
Line-up
Saturday 27 May	Sunday 28 May
Main Stage
Katy Perry; Biffy Clyro; Emeli Sandé; Kasabian; Lorde; Imagine Dragons; James Arthur; Galantis; Zara Larsson	Kings of Leon; Clean Bandit; The Chainsmokers; Rita Ora; Bastille; Sean Paul; Shawn Mendes; Stormzy; Little Mix
Where It Begins
Plan B Two Door Cinema Club; HAIM; Lana Del Rey; You Me at Six; London Grammar; Rag'n'Bone Man; JP Cooper; The Amazons	Royal Blood alt-J; Christine and the Queens; Twin Atlantic; Dua Lipa; Circa Waves; Mura Masa; Blossoms; Anne-Marie
BBC Introducing Stage
Zuzu; Krrum; FLAWES; Shells; Scorpz; Declan McKenna; Stevie Parker; The Modern Strangers; The Hubbards; LIFE; Superfood; Chiedu Oraka	Pale Waves; Freak; Cosima; Lumer; Haarm; Loyle Carner; Seramic; Brand New Friend; Jack Conman; The Big Moon; Mullally; Our Girl

==== Headline sets ====
Katy Perry
1. "Chained to the Rhythm"
2. "Bon Appétit"
3. "Teenage Dream"
4. "Firework"
5. "Dark Horse"
6. "E.T."
7. "Part of Me"
8. "California Gurls"
9. "I Kissed a Girl"
10. "Swish Swish"
11. "Roar"
Kings of Leon
1. "Waste a Moment"
2. "The Bucket"
3. "Supersoaker"
4. "Fans"
5. "Reverend"
6. "On Call"
7. "WALLS"
8. "Find Me"
9. "Crawl"
10. "Notion"
11. "Use Somebody"
12. "Radioactive"
13. "Sex on Fire"

=== 2018 ===
In order to take advantage of the absence of the Glastonbury Festival in 2018, 4 separate Big Weekends were held simultaneously between 25 and 28 May in four cities each in the UK's four countries. Stylized as "BBC Music's Biggest Weekend", events were held in Swansea (with a line-up curated by Radio 1), Coventry and Perth (both curated by Radio 2) and Belfast (curated by Radio 6 Music). Tickets sold out for the Swansea, Perth and Coventry Big Weekends.

==== Line-up ====
===== Belfast =====
Line-up
Friday 25 May	Saturday 26 May
Main Stage
Orbital; Beck; Manic Street Preachers; The Breeders; Courtney Barnett; Public Service Broadcasting; Lykke Li; Father John Misty; Ulster Orchestra	Underworld; Franz Ferdinand; First Aid Kit; Neneh Cherry; Ash; Little Dragon; Young Fathers; Goldie
Radio 6 Recommends Stage
David Holmes; The Orielles; Jordan Rakei; Hannah Peel; Baloji; TOUTS; Phoebe Bridgers	Mary Anne Hobbs; Shame; Superorganism; Hollie Cook; Dream Wife; Imarhan; SOAK

===== Perth =====
Line-up
Friday 25 May	Saturday 26 May
Main Stage
Nigel Kennedy; Danielle de Niese; Evelyn Glennie; Eddi Reader; Scottish Symphony Orchestra; Mica Paris & Michael Xavier; Karine Polwart; Jamie Cullum	Noel Gallagher's High Flying Birds; Simple Minds; Emeli Sandé; Squeeze; The Shires; Amy Macdonald; The Beat starring Dave Wakeling; Julie Fowlis
Radio 2 Stage
Moishe's Bagel; Namvula; Mezcla; Breabach; Sistema Scotland; Scottish Symphony Orchestra	Rae Morris; Callum Beattie; Blue Rose Code; Andy Brown; Hannah Grace; ONR; Emma McGrath; Vistas

===== Swansea =====
Line-up
Saturday 26 May	Sunday 27 May
Main Stage
Sam Smith; Craig David; Jess Glynne; George Ezra; Years & Years; Liam Payne; Clean Bandit; Anne-Marie; Ed Sheeran	Florence + the Machine; Taylor Swift; Thirty Seconds to Mars; Shawn Mendes; Camila Cabello; Jason Derulo; Demi Lovato; Luis Fonsi; Niall Horan; Rita Ora
Radio 1's Other Stage
Bastille; Wolf Alice; CHVRCHES; MØ; Mabel; Not3s; Sigrid; Jorja Smith; Steel Banglez	James Bay; Panic! at the Disco; Christine and the Queens; J Hus; Jessie Ware; Stefflon Don; Hailee Steinfeld; Jax Jones; Tom Walker
BBC Music Introducing Stage
Astroid Boys; Band Pres Llareggub; Chroma; Mellt; Annabel Allum; Bad Mannequins; Alicai Harley; Isaac Gracie; Connie Constance; Fizzy Blood; Sea Girls	Trampolene; Rachel K Collier; Boy Azooga; Serol Serol; Esha Maria; The Howl & The Hum; Caitlyn Scarlett; Mahalia; Declan J Donovan; Yungblud; Art School Girlfriend

===== Coventry =====
Line-up
Sunday 26 May	Monday 27 May
Main Stage
Liam Gallagher; Stereophonics; Paloma Faith; UB40; Billy Ocean; Snow Patrol; Jamie Cullum; The Selecter	Nigel Kennedy; Strictly Come Dancing; BBC Concert Orchestra; Miloš Karadaglić; Eliza Carthy; GoGo Penguin; Angélique Kidjo
Radio 2 Stage
Turin Brakes; The Wandering Hearts; Jalen N'Gonda; Catherine McGrath; Ten Tonnes; Nikhil; Brother Zulu; Joe Dolman	Dinosaur; Dorcha; JK; Jon Boden; Jaguar Land Rover Band

Sam Smith
1. "One Last Song"
2. "I'm Not the Only One"
3. "Like I Can"
4. "Lay Me Down"
5. "Latch"
6. "Money on My Mind"
7. "Midnight Train"
8. "Baby, You Make Me Crazy"
9. "Him"
10. "Pray"
11. "Stay with Me"
12. "Too Good at Goodbyes"
Florence + the Machine
1. "Queen of Peace"
2. "Only If for a Night"
3. "Hunger"
4. "Sweet Nothing"
5. "Dog Days Are Over"
6. "Sk"
7. "You Got the Love"
8. "Ship to Wreck"
9. "What Kind of Man"
10. "Shake It Out"

=== 2019 ===
On 27 February, Greg James announced on the Radio 1 Breakfast Show that the Big Weekend would be held in Stewart Park, Middlesbrough, England for 2019 with Miley Cyrus, The 1975, Little Mix, Mabel, Zara Larsson and Khalid performing. The daily capacity was 32,000.

Line-up
Friday 24 May	Saturday 25 May	Sunday 26 May
Dance Stage	Main Stage	
Mark Ronson; MK; Annie Mac; Danny Howard; Wilkinson x Sub Focus x Dimension; Purple Disco Machine	Miley Cyrus; Foals; Khalid; James Arthur; Billie Eilish; Sigala; Anne-Marie; Mumford & Sons	The 1975; Ellie Goulding; Sean Paul; Rita Ora; Catfish and the Bottlemen; Jax Jones; Zara Larsson; Little Mix; Got What It Takes?
Mark Ronson; MK; Annie Mac; Danny Howard; Wilkinson x Sub Focus x Dimension; Purple Disco Machine	The 1 for New Music Stage	
Mark Ronson; MK; Annie Mac; Danny Howard; Wilkinson x Sub Focus x Dimension; Purple Disco Machine	Bring Me the Horizon; Future; Vampire Weekend; Charli XCX; Lewis Capaldi; The Amazons; Sam Fender; Stormzy	Twenty One Pilots; Dave; Two Door Cinema Club; Mabel; Sigrid; Pale Waves; Hrvy; CamelPhat; AJ Tracey
Mark Ronson; MK; Annie Mac; Danny Howard; Wilkinson x Sub Focus x Dimension; Purple Disco Machine	BBC Music Introducing Stage	
Mark Ronson; MK; Annie Mac; Danny Howard; Wilkinson x Sub Focus x Dimension; Purple Disco Machine	Aitch; Dylan Cartlidge; Hamzaa; The Amazons; Eve Conway; Barny Fletcher; L Devine; Jade Bird; Rika; Charlotte OC	Slowthai; Bloxx; Joy Crookes; Cape Club; Bellah; Llovers; Tom Walker; The Orielles; Sophie and The Giants; Emily Burns

==== Headline sets ====
Miley Cyrus
1. "Nothing Breaks Like a Heart"
2. "Mother's Daughter"
3. "Cattitude"
4. "D.R.E.A.M."
5. "We Can't Stop" with Charli XCX
6. "Malibu"
7. "Jolene"
8. "Party in the U.S.A."
9. "Can't Be Tamed"
10. "Wrecking Ball"
The 1975
1. "Give Yourself a Try"
2. "TooTimeTooTimeTooTime"
3. "Sincerity Is Scary"
4. "It's Not Living (If It's Not with You)"
5. "Love Me"
6. Robbers"
7. "I Like America & America Likes Me"
8. "Somebody Else"
9. "I Always Wanna Die (Sometimes)

Encore

12. Love It If We Made It"
13. "Chocolate"
14. "Sex"
15. "The Sound"

== 2020s ==
=== 2020 ===
On 27 January, Greg James announced on the Radio 1 Breakfast Show that the Big Weekend would be returning to Camperdown Park in Dundee in 2020 with Dua Lipa and Harry Styles headlining. With Camperdown Park having previously hosted the Big Weekend in 2006, it would have been the first time the same venue hosted the event twice - and the second time the Big Weekend has visited the same city twice, after Derry in 2004 and 2013.

On 13 March 2020, it was announced that the Big Weekend had been cancelled due to the COVID-19 pandemic.

However, in late April 2020 it was announced that there would be a virtual version airing on Radio 1 on the weekend of Friday 22 - Sunday 24 May 2020. The new Big Weekend festival featured newly recorded mini sets from the artist's homes as well as re-airings of full sets from previous Big Weekend performers over four "virtual stages".

Line-up
Friday 22 May	Saturday 23 May	Sunday 24 May
Dance Stage	Main Stage	
Fatboy Slim and Eats Everything; Bicep; Jamie Jones; Hannah Wants; Solardo; The Black Madonna; CamelPhat; High Contrast; Disclosure; Armand van Helden	Sam Smith; Anne-Marie; Blossoms; Mabel; Lauv; Yungblud; Becky Hill; Haim; Aitch x AJ Tracey; Doja Cat	Jonas Brothers; Rita Ora; Niall Horan; Biffy Clyro; Dermot Kennedy; Sean Paul; Declan McKenna; Young T & Bugsey; Rex Orange County; Ellie Goulding
Fatboy Slim and Eats Everything; Bicep; Jamie Jones; Hannah Wants; Solardo; The Black Madonna; CamelPhat; High Contrast; Disclosure; Armand van Helden	Headliner's Stage	
Fatboy Slim and Eats Everything; Bicep; Jamie Jones; Hannah Wants; Solardo; The Black Madonna; CamelPhat; High Contrast; Disclosure; Armand van Helden	Katy Perry (2014); Coldplay (2016); Ed Sheeran (2018); Billie Eilish (2019); Kings of Leon (2017); Shawn Mendes (2018); One Direction (2014); Calvin Harris (2014); Bruno Mars (2013); Khalid (2019); Jay-Z (2012)	Little Mix (2019); The 1975 (2019); Lady Gaga (2011); Stormzy (2019); Rihanna (2012); Mumford & Sons (2019); Miley Cyrus (2019); Muse (2015); Florence and the Machine (2018); Twenty One Pilots (2019); Foo Fighters (2015); Bring Me the Horizon (2016)
Fatboy Slim and Eats Everything; Bicep; Jamie Jones; Hannah Wants; Solardo; The Black Madonna; CamelPhat; High Contrast; Disclosure; Armand van Helden	1 Xtra Stage	
Fatboy Slim and Eats Everything; Bicep; Jamie Jones; Hannah Wants; Solardo; The Black Madonna; CamelPhat; High Contrast; Disclosure; Armand van Helden	Stormzy (2017); Alicia Keys (2010); J Hus (2018); Snoop Dogg (2015); Koffee; Dave (2019); Pharrell Williams (2014); Nas (2012); Ms Banks; Dizzee Rascal (2013); Mahalia; AJ Tracey (2019); ASAP Rocky (2013); Afro B Aitch (2019); Stefflon Don (2018); Jorja Smith (2018)	

- Artists in italics have recorded new performances for the 2020 Big Weekend.

=== 2021 ===
Due to the continuing pandemic, the 2021 edition of Big Weekend was again held virtually. As with 2020, the event included a mixture of newly recorded performances and archive sets from previous years. It was held on 29 and 30 May 2021.

Line-up
Dance Stage	Main Stage	Headliner's Stage	Live Lounge	Piano Sessions
Eric Prydz; Bicep; Floorplan; Honey Dijon; Logic1000; Michael Bibi; Patrick Topping; Paul Woolford; Solomun; The Blessed Madonna	Ed Sheeran; Coldplay; Jorja Smith; AJ Tracey; Royal Blood; Mabel; Wolf Alice; Celeste; London Grammar; Anne-Marie	Billie Eilish (2019); Stormzy (2019); Little Mix (2019); Foo Fighters (2015); Jay-Z (2012); The 1975 (2019); Shawn Mendes (2018); Rihanna (2012); Sam Smith (2018); Miley Cyrus (2019); Blossoms (2020); Katy Perry (2014); Bring Me the Horizon (2016); Doja Cat (2020); Florence and the Machine (2018); Calvin Harris (2014); Twenty One Pilots (2019); Lady Gaga (2011); Kings of Leon (2017); Khalid (2019); Mumford & Sons (2019); Rex Orange County (2020)	Ariana Grande (2018); Harry Styles (2019); Dua Lipa (2018); Lewis Capaldi (2019); Lizzo (2020); Alicia Keys (2020); George Ezra (2018); Lana Del Rey (2019); Charli XCX and Christine and the Queens (2019); Hayley Williams (2020); Years & Years (2018); Sam Fender (2020); Sigrid (2021); The xx (2017); Vampire Weekend (2019); Glass Animals (2020)	Phoebe Bridgers and Arlo Parks (2020); Foals (2020); Haim (2020); Lianne La Havas (2020); Thom Yorke (2018); Griff (2021); Tom Grennan (2020); Dodie (2019); Låpsley (2020); Clairo (2019); Alessia Cara (2018); King Princess (2019); Mac Demarco (2019)

- Artists in italics recorded new performances for the 2021 Big Weekend.

==== Headline sets ====
Ed Sheeran
1. "Castle on the Hill"
2. "The A Team"
3. "Galway Girl"
4. "Visiting Hours"
5. "Sing"
6. "Bloodstream"
7. "Thinking Out Loud"
8. "I See Fire"
9. "Perfect"
10. "Shape of You"
11. "Afterglow"
Coldplay
1. "Music of the Spheres"
2. "Higher Power"
3. "Something Just Like This"
4. "The Scientist"
5. "Magic"
6. "Human Heart"
7. "Adventure of a Lifetime"
8. "Viva la Vida"
9. "Fix You"
10. "A Sky Full of Stars"

==== BBC Introducing sets ====
1. "23, Never Me" - Dead Pony

=== 2022 ===
In late 2021, it was revealed that Radio 1's Big Weekend would return in a live tradition for the first time in three years, with Coventry being the host city for this event on 27 to 29 May 2022.

On 14 May and 16 March 2022, Saturday's & Sunday's main stage line-up were retrospectively announced on The Radio 1 Breakfast Show with Greg James whilst the Future Sounds Stage line-up was announced on Radio 1's Future Sounds with Clara Amfo.

Line-up
Friday 27 May	Saturday 28 May	Sunday 29 May
Main Stage
No performances	Calvin Harris; Ed Sheeran; Anne-Marie; Aitch; Central Cee; AJ Tracey; Joel Corry; Yungblud	Harry Styles; George Ezra; Lorde; Becky Hill; Dermot Kennedy; Jax Jones; Mabel; Chase & Status
Radio One's Future Sounds Stage
Disclosure; BOYOCA; Danny Howard; Eats Everything b2b Shermanology; Jodie Harsh; LP Giobbi b2b Ben Hemsley; Patrick Topping; Pete Tong b2b Franky Wah; Sam Divine; Sarah Story b2b Jaguar	Sam Fender; Easy Life; Fontaines D.C. KSI; Mimi Webb; Sigrid; Tom Grennan; Pa Salieu	Foals; Alfie Templeman; Griff; Holly Humberstone; Joy Crookes; Koffee; Wet Leg; Rina Sawayama
Radio One Dance Stage
AmyElle; Bklava; Craig & Grant Gordon; Emily Nash; LF System; Meg Ward; Nia Archives; Prospa	Arielle Free; Charlie T Jaguar; Pete Tong; René LaVice; Sarah Story; Charlie Hedges	Danny Howard; Jeremiah Asiamah; Kenny Allstar; Target
BBC Music Introducing Stage
Anish Kumar; Barry Can't Swim; Hannah Laing; Jaguar B2B ABSOLUTE; Junior SIMBA; Kilig; Lau.ra; TAAHLIAH	Artemas; Celina Sharma; Deyah; Jordan Mckampa; Tamera; Thomas Headon; USNA; Willow Kayne A1 x J1	Alfie Indra; Crawlers; Danniella Dee; Hope Tala; Lizzie Esau; Piri & Tommy; Queen Millz; Sad Night Dynamite Tom Walker
Radio 1 Relax Tent
—N/a	Penelope; Sian Eleri	Jess Iszatt; Jessie Marcella

==== Headline sets ====
Ed Sheeran
1. "Shivers"
2. "Overpass Graffiti"
3. "Castle on the Hill"
4. "The A Team"
5. "2step" (with Potter Payper)
6. "Perfect"
7. "Bloodstream"
8. "Shape of You"
9. "Thinking Out Loud"
10. "Bad Habits"
Harry Styles
1. "Golden"
2. "Watermelon Sugar"
3. "Music for a Sushi Restaurant"
4. "Adore You"
5. "Daylight"
6. "Lights Up"
7. "Treat People with Kindness"
8. "What Makes You Beautiful"
9. "Late Night Talking"
10. "As It Was"
11. "Sign of the Times"
12. "Kiwi"

=== 2023 ===
On 30 January 2023, Dundee (which was originally scheduled to host the 2020 festival) was announced as the host city for the 2023 edition of Big Weekend alongside the initial line-up. Dundee is the first Scottish city and second overall city to host the event twice.

Line-up
Friday 26 May	Saturday 27 May	Sunday 28 May
Main Stage
No performances	The 1975; Jonas Brothers; ArrDee; Jess Glynne; Joel Corry; Mimi Webb; Tom Grennan	Lewis Capaldi; Wet Leg; Anne-Marie; Becky Hill; Nothing But Thieves; Royal Blood; Zara Larsson; Niall Horan
Radio One's Future Sounds Stage
Jamie XX; LF System; Jayda G Danny Howard; Eliza Rose; Ben Hemsley; Denis Sulta; Pete Tong b2b Sarah Story; Testpress	Rudimental; Danny Howard; FLO; Headie One; Pale Waves; Piri; Romy; Self Esteem; The Snuts	Sub Focus; Arlo Parks; Ashnikko; Cassyette; Thirty Seconds to Mars; Cat Burns; Georgia; Inhaler; Jack Saunders; RAYE
Radio One Dance Stage
Hannah Laing; AmyElle; Carly Wilford; D.O.D; Hayley Zalassi; Melle Brown; Salute; Schak	Charlie Tee; Connor Coates; Danny Howard; Jaguar; Pheobe Inglis-Holmes; Sarah Story	Arielle Free; Charlie Hedges; Connor Coates; Jaguar; Jeremiah Asiamah; Kenny Allstar
BBC Music Introducing Stage
Barry Can't Swim; Boo; DAINTY; Jaguar B2B KILIMANJARO; Kintra; Pheobe I-H; TIBASKO; Van Damn	Akemi Fox; ARXX; Bemz; Caity Baser; Olivia Dean; Chowerman; Sliime; Tom A. Smith; Venbee	Aby Coulibaly; Brooke Combe; Gretel Hanlyn; Katie Gregson-MacLeod; Michael Aldag; Piers James; Rose Gray; Terra Kin

==== Headline sets ====
Jonas Brothers
1. "Waffle House"
2. "What a Man Gotta Do"
3. "Only Human"
4. "Cool"
5. "Jealous" (Nick Jonas cover)
6. "Cake by the Ocean" (DNCE cover)
7. "Leave Before You Love Me"
8. "Summer Baby"
9. "Year 3000" (Busted cover)
10. "Burnin' Up"
11. "Sucker"
The 1975
1. "If You're Too Shy (Let Me Know)"
2. "Happiness"
3. "Oh Caroline"
4. "I'm in Love with You"
5. "It's Not Living (If It's Not with You)"
6. "About You"
7. "Robbers"
8. "Somebody Else"
9. "I Couldn't Be More in Love"
10. "Love It If We Made It"
11. "The Sound"
12. "Sex"
13. "Give Yourself a Try"
Wet Leg
1. "Being in Love"
2. "Wet Dream"
3. "Supermarket"
4. "Obvious"
5. "Oh No"
6. "Ur Mum"
7. "Too Late Now"
8. "Angelica"
9. "Chaise Longue"
Lewis Capaldi
1. "Forget Me"
2. "Forever"
3. "Pointless"
4. "Heavenly Kind of State of Mind"
5. "Before You Go"
6. "Bruises"
7. "Wish You the Best"
8. "Grace"
9. "Haven't You Ever Been in Love Before?"
10. "Hold Me While You Wait"
11. "Someone You Loved"

=== 2024 ===
On 29 January 2024, it was announced that Luton would host Big Weekend from 24 to 26 May 2024. The festival took place in Stockwood Park and was headlined by Coldplay, Chase & Status, Vampire Weekend, and Raye.

Line-up
Friday 24 May	Saturday 25 May	Sunday 26 May
Main Stage
Chase & Status; Becky Hill; Ella Henderson; Nathan Dawe; Rudimental	Raye; Aitch; Mabel; Rag'n'Bone Man; Griff; Jax Jones; Joel Corry	Coldplay; Vampire Weekend; Olly Alexander; Sabrina Carpenter; Declan McKenna; London Grammar; AJ Tracey
Radio One's New Music Stage
Eric Prydz; Diplo; Dimension; Hannah Laing; Kenya Grace; Sonny Fodera; Wilkinson	Charli XCX; Alfie Templeman; Caity Baser; Cat Burns; Dylan; The Last Dinner Party; Shygirl; Tems	Beabadoobee; CMAT; Everything Everything; Fizz; Olivia Dean; Remi Wolf; Sea Girls; Teddy Swims
Radio One Dance Stage
A Little Sound; Ammara; ESSEL; Girls Don't Sync; Joy Anonymous salute Sammy Virji; Y U QT	Charlie Tee; DJ Target; Jerimiah Asiamah; Kenny Allstar; Panjabi Hit Squad	Charlie Hedges; Danny Howard; DJ Kizzi; Sarah Story
BBC Music Introducing Stage
Charlieeeee; Deeps; JGrrey; LAVS; Sam Girling; Victor Ray	Cam Thomas; Issey Cross; Jarki Monno; Kiimi; Myles Smith; NewDad; Ryussi; Saloni	Beth McCarthy; Etta Marcus; Frozemode; JW Paris; Low Girl; Max Jones; Picture Parlour; Shehxna

==== Headline sets ====
Chase & Status
1. Smash TV
2. Selecta with Stefflon Don
3. Censor VIP
4. Liquor & Cigarettes with ArrDee
5. Time
6. Mixed Emotions with Clementine Douglas
7. Don't Be Scared
8. NRG
9. Let You Go
10. Disconnect
11. No Problem
12. Original Nuttah 25 with Irah
13. Baddadan with Irah
14. End Credits
15. All Goes Wrong with Ethan Holt
16. Blind Faith with Liam Bailey
17. Program with Irah
Raye
1. The Thrill Is Gone
2. Hard Out Here
3. Oscar Winning Tears
4. Ice Cream Man
5. Flip a Switch
6. Bed
7. You Don't Know Me
8. Secrets
9. Black Mascara
10. Prada
11. Worth It
12. Genesis
13. Escapism
Vampire Weekend
1. Gen-X Cops
2. Holiday
3. Unbelievers
4. Cape Cod Kwassa Kwassa
5. Classical
6. White Sky
7. Capricorn
8. This Life
9. Diane Young
10. Cousins
11. A-Punk
12. Campus
13. Oxford Comma
14. Harmony Hall
Coldplay
1. Higher Power
2. Paradise
3. Viva la Vida
4. Hymn For The Weekend
5. Clocks
6. Fix You
7. People of the Pride
8. Something Just Like This
9. Magic with Sabrina Carpenter
10. Yellow
11. A Sky Full of Stars
12. Orange

=== 2025 ===
On 28 January 2025, it was announced that Liverpool would host Big Weekend from 23 to 25 May 2025. It was hosted in Sefton Park, and the first confirmed acts were Blossoms, Lola Young, Myles Smith, Sam Fender and Wet Leg.

==== Radio 1 Main Stage ====
Friday	Saturday	Sunday
Tom Grennan; Biffy Clyro; James Hype; Natasha Bedingfield; The Wombats	Sam Fender; Wolf Alice; Blossoms; Myles Smith; Sugababes; Tom Odell	Mumford & Sons; HAIM; Wet Leg; Jorja Smith; Lola Young; Tate McRae

==== Radio 1 New Music Stage ====
Friday	Saturday	Sunday
Confidence Man; Nia Archives; Katy B; Prospa; Jazzy; Barry Can't Swim; D.O.D	Aitch B2B AJ Tracey; Inhaler; Jordan Adetunji; Artemas; Good Neighbours; Ed Sheeran	Jade; Self Esteem; Flo; Joy Crookes; Hard Life; South Arcade

==== Radio 1 Dance Stage ====
Friday	Saturday	Sunday
Kettama; Fish56Octagon; Girls Don't Sync; Paige Tomlinson; Martha; Charlie Hedges; Shelly	Connor Coates; Phoebe I-H; Sarah Story; Danny Howard; Arielle Free; Charlotte Plank	Jeremiah Asiamah; Phoebe I-H; Charlie Tee; Martha; Sarah Story; Essel; Boo

==== BBC Introducing Stage ====
Friday	Saturday	Sunday
Crawlers; Tonia; Billy Khan; Esme Emerson; JayaHadADream; Leonie Biney; Miles Temp	Luvcat; Superlate; Sienna Spiro; Mackenzy Mackay; Jetta; Erin LeCount; Liang Lawrence; KOJ; Charlotte Plank (Secret Set)	Pixey; Le Boom; Courting; aimei 媚; Fat Dog; Dirty Nice; Keyside; PaisleighB; Skye Newman

==== Headline sets ====
Tom Grennan
1. Found What I've Been Looking For
2. How Does It Feel
3. Higher
4. Let's Go Home Together with Ella Henderson
5. Full Attention
6. When You're Gone with Melanie C
7. Remind Me
8. Not Over Yet with KSI
9. All Goes Wrong
10. Lionheart (Fearless) / By Your Side
11. Valerie with The Zutons
12. Little Bit of Love
13. Something In the Water
Sam Fender
1. Getting Started
2. The Borders
3. Will We Talk?
4. People Watching
5. Arm's Length
6. Howdon Aldi Death Queue
7. Tyrants
8. Spit of You
9. Little Bit Closer
10. Seventeen Going Under
11. Hypersonic Missiles
Mumford & Sons
1. I Will Wait
2. Caroline
3. Truth
4. Awake My Soul
5. Lover of the Light
6. Little Lion Man
7. Believe
8. Rushmere
9. Ditmas
10. The Wolf
11. Delta
12. The Cave

=== 2026 ===
In November 2025, it was announced that Big Weekend would return to Sunderland's Herrington Country Park from 22 to 24 May 2026. In March 2026, Greg James announced on Radio 1's breakfast show the year's line-up.

==== Radio 1 Main Stage ====
Friday	Saturday	Sunday
Fatboy Slim; Clementine Douglas; Fisher; MK; Sonny Fodera	Zara Larsson; Ellie Goulding; Lola Young; Louis Tomlinson; Nothing But Thieves; Skye Newman	Olivia Dean; CMAT; Dermot Kennedy; Kehlani; Myles Smith; Niall Horan

==== Radio 1 New Music Stage ====
Friday	Saturday	Sunday
Ahadadream B2B Arthi; Danny Howard B2B Patrick Topping; Ewan McVicar; horsegiirL; L.P. Rhythm; Marlon Hoffstadt; NOTION	James Blake; Erin LeCount; Florence Road; Mitski; MUNA; Rachel Chinouriri; Wasia Project	Ezra Collective; Alessi Rose; FLO; Holly Humberstone; Jorja Smith (party set); Maisie Peters; Odeal

==== BBC Introducing Stage ====
Friday	Saturday	Sunday
Anish Kumar; Ellie Scougall; Jaguar; Max Jones; Mia Lily; Niamh; Sorley	Aaron Rowe; Bella Barbe; BombayMami; Heidi Curtis; LeoStayTrill; Swindled; Tom A Smith	Able Jack; DC3; Finn Forster; Imogen and the Knife; RUBII; Venus Grrrls; Wohdee

==== Headline sets ====
Zara Larsson
1. "Lush Life" (ambient version, shortened)
2. "Midnight Sun"
3. "Blue Moon"
4. "Can't Tame Her"
5. "I Would Like" / "Sundown"
6. "Pretty Ugly"
7. "Ain't My Fault"
8. "Hot & Sexy"
9. "Stateside" (shortened)
10. "Crush"
11. "Lush Life"
12. "Never Forget You"
13. "Midnight Sun" (2026 live arrangement)
14. "Symphony"
Olivia Dean
1. "Nice to Each Other"
2. "Lady Lady"
3. "So Easy (To Fall in Love)"
4. "Close Up"
5. "Let Alone the One You Love"
6. "Echo"
7. "Time"
8. "A Couple Minutes"
9. "The Hardest Part"
10. "Baby Steps"
11. "Ladies Room"
12. "Move On Up" (Curtis Mayfield cover)
13. "OK Love You Bye"
14. "It Isn't Perfect But It Might Be"
15. "Dive"
16. "Man I Need"
