= Sliime =

British rapper

- Origin: Sheffield, England
- Genres: Bengali rap
- Occupation: rapper
- Years active: 2021 -
- Labels: Def Jam

TikTok information
- Page: Sliime
- Followers: 44,600
- Last updated: 7 December 2024

Sliime is a rapper from Sheffield, England, who produces music based upon his Bengali heritage. His 2023 single "Lehenga" peaked at #5 in the UK Asian Music Chart, and has been often viewed via social media.

== Career ==
Sliime is from Sharrow, Sheffield, England. His parents are from Bangladesh, and although growing up he was not focused on his South Asian/Bangladeshi heritage he began celebrating it when producing his music. His real name is not confirmed, and Sliime is often pictured in a face mask, further obscuring his identity.

In 2021 Sliime wrote the rap song "Allow It" to encourage people to have their vaccines for the COVID-19 disease. It was one of the first rap songs in the UK to address vaccine reluctancy. In July 2022 Sliime was named "artist of the week" on the BBC Asian Network, and in 2023 he performed live at BBC Radio 1's Big Weekend in Dundee.

His single “The Hustle – Freestyle”, in both English and Bengali, was positively received, in particular for its "gritty, fast paced beat". In 2023 Sliime released the single "Lehenga", which he produced to "make South Asian women feel empowered about themselves and the way they dress". The track was a hit on social media, reaching c. 53 million views on TikTok, and peaked at number 5 in the UK Asian Music Chart. Subsequently, he was signed with Def Jam Recordings India to release further music. His 2024 single, "Bengali", is about the residual stigma surrounding migrants to the UK, and was playlisted by 1Xtra.

== Discography ==
Sliime singles
Title	Year	Peak UK Asian Music Chart
"Allow It"	2021	-
"The Hustle – Freestyle"		-
"Boishakhi Mela"		-
"Lehenga"	2023	5
"Welcome to the party (Dola Re)"	2024	38
"Bengali"	2024	39
"3am in Whitechapel"	2024	39
"Manners"	2025	6

== See also ==
- Lehenga
