= Doof in the Park =

Electronic music festival in Dundee, Scotland

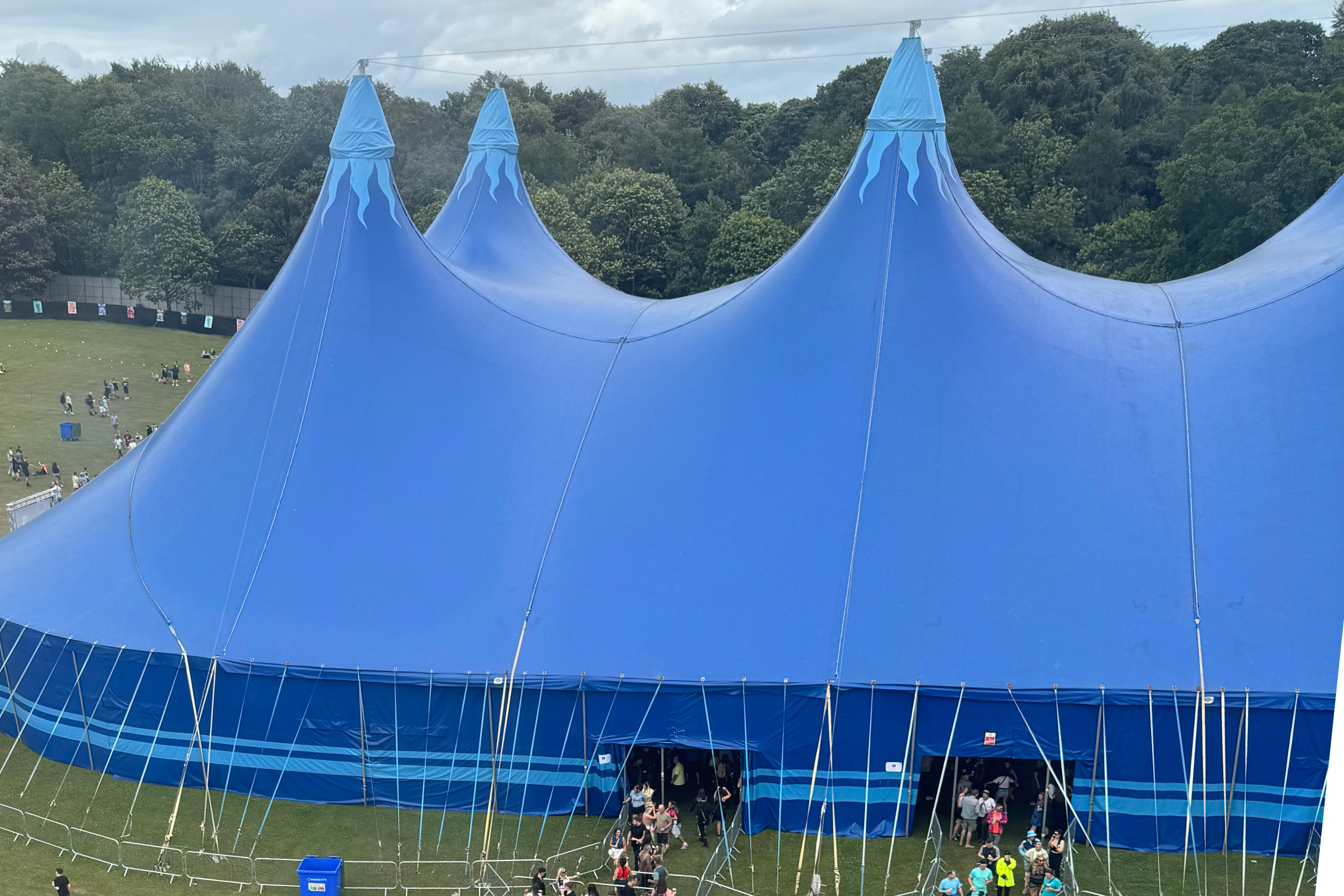
- The Doof for Life tent at the 2025 festival
- Genre: Electronic dance music
- Dates: July
- Locations: Camperdown Park, Dundee, Scotland
- Years active: 2025–2026
- Inaugurated: 2025
- Founder: Hannah Laing
- Attendance: 17,000 (2026)
- Organiser: Doof Music

Doof in the Park (stylised as doof in the Park) is an annual electronic dance music festival held at Camperdown Park in Dundee, Scotland. Organised by Doof Music, the event was founded by Dundee-based DJ and producer Hannah Laing. The inaugural festival took place in 2025 and attracted an audience of approximately 15,000 attendees.

== History ==
Doof in the Park was first announced in 2024 by Dundee-born DJ and producer Hannah Laing through her music label and events brand, Doof.

The concept aimed to create a large-scale electronic music festival in Dundee, combining international and Scottish artists within the genres of techno, trance, and hard dance.

The inaugural event was preceded by a short, intimate set by Laing at LiveHouse Dundee in the underground car park, described as a taster for Doof in the Park, as part of the Dundee Dance Event. The inaugural event took place on 5 July 2025 at Camperdown Park. The site was adapted to accommodate an estimated 15,000 attendees, with designated stage areas, fencing, and temporary infrastructure.

The festival featured three performance areas: Doof for Life, Up the Doof, and The Highlander. Each stage represented a different musical focus, from mainstream electronic acts to underground and local performers.

The Highlander stage was modelled and named after the bar with the same name in San Antonio, Ibiza, where Laing had her first residency on the island.

The inaugural 2025 edition, hosted on 5 July, received positive reviews for its production quality and line-up, which included internationally recognised artists such as Armin van Buuren, Judge Jules, and Lisa Lashes, alongside local DJs from Scotland's electronic music scene. However, some attendees and commentators noted limited amenities on-site, including the number of food vendors and rest facilities.

Following the inaugural event, an afterparty was held at Fat Sams featuring some of the artists that performed at the festival, with organisers confirming that Doof in the Park would return in 2026, again at Camperdown Park after it was a huge success.

The 2026 event, hosted on 4 July, featured a line-up that included established and emerging artists such as Paul van Dyk, Eddie Halliwell, Novah, Maddix, Odymel, and The Rocket Man, indicating an expansion in both scale and international reach. The 2026 event also saw the introduction of a new stage “Keep it Fucking Moving”, a smaller stage which featured some of the DJs that trained at Doof Studios in Dundee’s Change Centre that was opened by Laing in December 2025.

A 2027 event was confirmed after the previous event and was scheduled to be hosted on 3 July, however Laing confirmed on 8 November 2026 that it was cancelled due to behind the scenes issues. It is unclear whether the festival will return in future.

== Stages ==
=== Doof for Life ===
Doof for Life is the festival's main stage and hosts the event's headline performances. The stage features a mixture of Scottish, English and international DJs and attracts the festival's largest audiences. It is housed within the former Slam tent previously used at T in the Park.

=== Up the Doof ===
Up the Doof is located inside a large greenhouse structure and hosts electronic dance music performances throughout the festival. The stage forms one of the festival's indoor venues and features a programme of established and emerging DJs.

=== The Highlander ===
The Highlander is modelled on the bar of the same name in San Antonio, Ibiza, where festival founder Hannah Laing held her first DJ residency. The stage primarily showcases Scottish and local DJs and incorporates design elements inspired by the original venue.

=== Keep it Fucking Moving ===
Keep it Fucking Moving is an outdoor stage introduced for the 2026 festival. The stage primarily features DJs who began their training at Doof Studios, a music studio based at Dundee's Change Centre. Its design includes two cars - one blue and one green - with their engines replaced by smoke machines as part of the stage production.

== Editions ==
=== 2025 ===
Line-up
Doof for Life	Up the Doof	The Highlander
Hannah Laing; Armin Van Buuren; Fish56Octagon; Judge Jules; Lisa Lashes; Van Damn; Will Atkinson	Charlie Sparks; Franck; Jezza & Jod; K.A.D; ØTTA sim0ne Somewhen	Billy Morris; Charlie Kennedy; Jack Low; Keir Caithness; Kieran b2b Leechy; Made Academy Student; Matty Ralph; Mike McDonald; Paul Findlay; Ross Mac

=== 2026 ===
Line-up
Doof for Life	Up the Doof	The Highlander	Keep It Fucking Moving
Hannah Laing; Paul van Dyk; Lilly Palmer; Maddix; Eddie Halliwell; BK; MDDLTN	Clara Cuvé; Marie Vaunt; David Rust b2b David Forbes; ALT8; The Rocketman; Leechy; Evie Twiin	Sasha b2b Perekos; Ryan Keogh; Tyler Jack; SHVDZ; Bellini Beats; ASLØ b2b Miss Frenxh; Loz; DJ Guffers b2b Johnny Reid	Kieran Cameron; Lematt; Stisema; Don; A-TØN; Paul Findlay; Westy; VSY
