= Ranx =

Ranx may refer to

- Ranx or RanXerox, a science fiction graphic novel series
- Ranx, a 1990 video game based on the RanXerox graphic novel Ranx à New-York
- Ranx the Sentient City, fictional sentient planetoid from DC Comics

== Surname ==
- Coolie Ranx, a musician
- Delly Ranx, a Jamaican dancehall deejay and record producer
- Robbo Ranx, a UK dancehall and reggae deejay
- Biga Ranx, a French reggae/hip-hop artist
