= Tippatone Sound =

Tippatone Sound is a sound system from London, active in the 1980s. It was founded by Robbo Ranx, who was also the sound's selector and producer. The sound also recorded with General Levy.
