= Franko Fraize =

- Origin: Thetford, England, United Kingdom
- Genres: British hip hop
- Years active: 2007–present

Frankie Dean, known by his stage name as Franko Fraize, is an independent British rapper. He is the cousin of popular YouTuber Jack Dean, known as JaackMaate.

== Career ==
Fraize started posting his music on MySpace and YouTube, eventually being featured on BBC Norfolk, BBC Suffolk and BBC Radio 1Xtra before having his single "Treasures" featuring Kamilla Lovett playlisted on BBC Radio 1 in January 2014. The video for the track had also been added to music TV channels Flava and Channel AKA.

In 2012, he supported Mike Skinner on the Norwich leg of The D.O.T. tour. Prior to having his track "Treasures" playlisted, Fraize had an earlier single – "Watch How I'm Moving" – playlisted as well. He also had his video for "Hand Me Downs" chosen for the BBC Music Video Festival where it was broadcast on big screens across the UK. In December 2013, "Hand Me Downs" was featured on Sky Sports' football magazine show Soccer AM.

In August, Fraize's single "Underdog" was featured on the BBC's The Football League Show and later on Soccer AM.

== Outside music ==
Fraize started working for BT aged 19 as an apprentice. As of December 2015, he still works for BT in Ethernet in Norwich.
