= Hip Hop Raised Me =

2016 book by DJ Semtex

- Author: DJ Semtex
- Language: English
- Genre: Music history, Photography
- Published: Thames & Hudson
- Publication place: United Kingdom
- Pages: 448
- ISBN: 9780500293959

Hip Hop Raised Me is a 2016 Hip hop culture and photography book created and written by DJ Semtex, (host of the Hip Hop Raised Me podcast recorded in the United Kingdom). The book depicts hip-hop's long and eventful history exploring the genre's significant components MCing, Turntablism, Breakdancing, Graffiti art, and examines hip-hop's enduring influence on contemporary mainstream culture.

== Details ==
The book was edited by Marium Raja and features a forward by Chuck D.

Semtex opens the book with the personal account of losing his arm as a child and discovering comfort in hip-hop. The story then serves in part as a guide to the genre's history, from Kool Herc to Future, including many female MCs. The book explores hip-hop's global successes, and recounts the scene's role in Barack Obama’s election. It includes many previously unpublished photographs, and covers topics such as Scratching competitions.

== Book reception ==
Billboard calls it, An epic book.

Sony Music reflects, In his critically-acclaimed bestselling book Hip Hop Raised Me, DJ Semtex's relationships with the hip hop community run deep.

Afro Visualism describes the book as, A massive collection of photography, a plethora of album covers, and footnotes galore, a well-written book of immense depth.

Hypebeast says , Semtex reflects on how the genre has had a huge impact on his own life.

Books Run praises, A stunning and comprehensive celebration of hip-hop culture, appealing strongly to longtime fans.

== Editions ==
The initial 2016 450 page hardbound edition measures 9.6" x 12.2" x 1.2". In 2019, Thames & Hudson released a 448-page paperback edition measuring 8.5" x 11" x 1.5".

== Featured recording artists ==
Featured artists referred to in the book include;Grandmaster Flash, N.W.A., Eminem,Kendrick Lamar. Kool Herc, Public Enemy, Kanye West, Jay-Z, Kanye West, Eminem, Macklemore, Ryan Lewis, Drake, Nicki Minaj, J. Cole, Kendrick Lamar, Nas, and the Wu-Tang Clan.

== Featured photographers ==
Photographic images in Hip Hop Raised Me were created by Martha Cooper, Henry Chalfant, Eddie Otchere, Normski, Janette Beckman, Chi Modu, Nabil Elderkin, Ithaka Darin Pappas, and Mark Humphrey.
