= RoRo (singer) =

Bajan singer-songwriter

- Born: Rochelle Griffith
- Origin: Barbados
- Genres: Soul, electronic dance music, R&B, calypso
- Occupations: Singer, songwriter
- Label: Mahogany Recordings
- Website: mahoganyrecordings.com/artists/roro/

Rochelle Griffith, known professionally as RoRo, is a Barbadian singer and songwriter. In 2023, her single "Good Love", which she co-wrote and performed with Hannah Laing, spent 26 weeks on the UK Singles Chart. It peaked at number 7, and was certified BPI platinum. RoRo has been regularly played on both BBC Radio 1 and BBC Radio 6, with her 2020 release "Mood Forever" earning her the "New Name" slot on the Annie Mac show. Her music has been described as "laid back R&B" influenced by calypso and soca, and as "distinctive Caribbean ingrained pop". RoRo's song "See Me" was on the soundtrack for the 2022 horror film spoof The Blackening, released in 2023.

== Discography ==
=== EPs ===
- Mood Forever (2020)
- Meet Me Where I'm At (2022)

=== Singles ===
- "Mine" (2019)
- "Black – Palace of Me" (2020)
- "R$ch B$tch" (2021)
- "Callin' in Thicc" (2022)
- "See Me" (2022)
- "Good Love" (with Hannah Laing, 2023, WUGD)
- "Shake Shake" (with Riton and Ian Asher, 2024)
- "Shine" (with Oliver Heldens, 2024)
- "925" (with Sammy Virji & Chris Lake, 2025)
