= Hannah Laing =

Scottish disc jockey and record producer

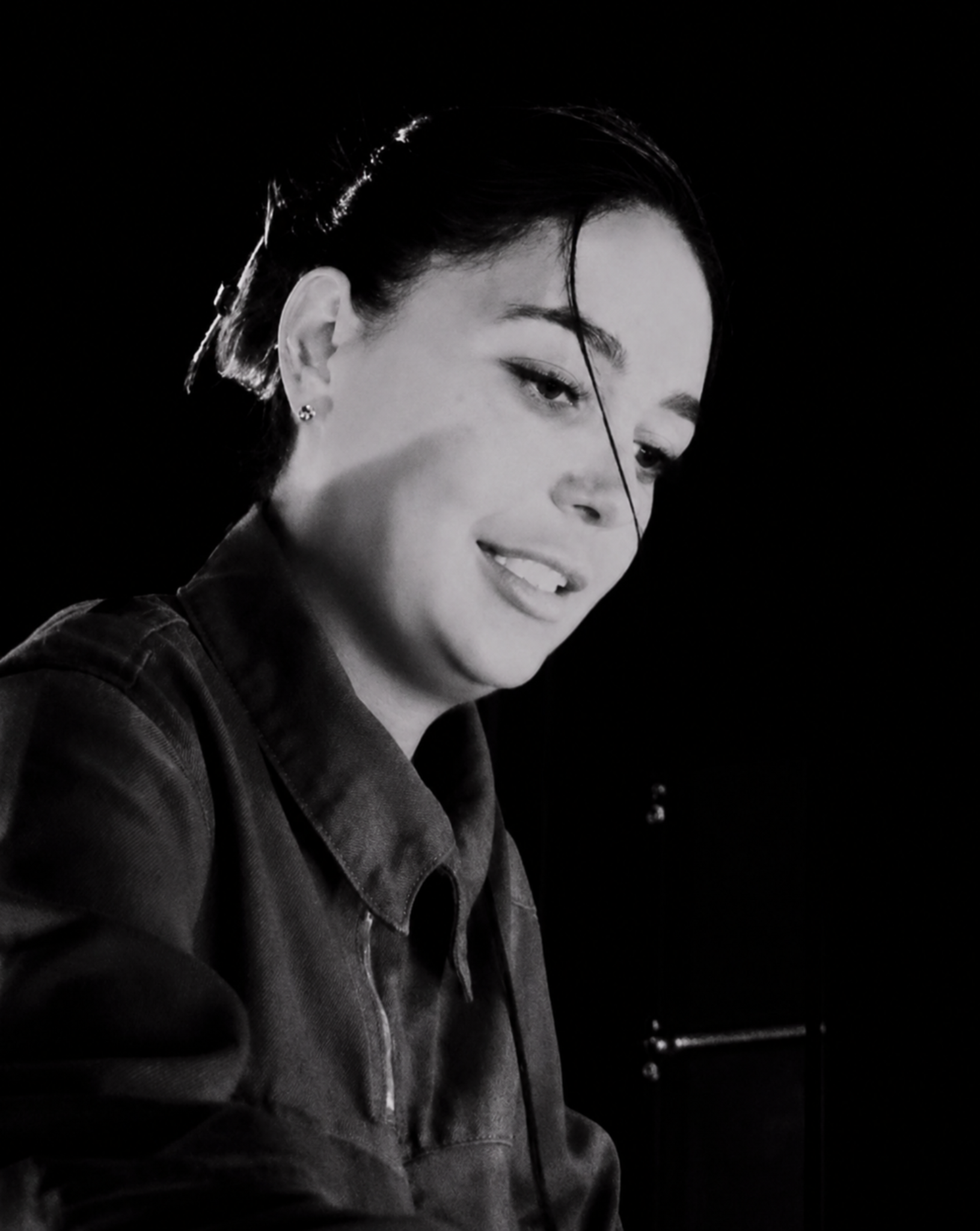
- Laing at Doof in the Park in 2026

Background information
- Born: August 12, 1994 (age 32)
- Origin: Dundee, Scotland
- Genres: Trance, techno, hard house
- Occupations: Record producer, DJ
- Years active: 2014–present
- Labels: Trick, Doof
- Website: tailored-communication.com/artists/hannah-laing

Hannah Laing (born 12 August 1994) is a Scottish disc jockey and electronic music producer from Dundee specialising in high energy trance, techno, and hard house. In 2023, she was nominated for a DJ Mag Best of Britain award. Laing has been regularly featured on BBC Radio 1, including performing a two-hour Essential Mix.

== Biography ==
=== Early life and career ===
Laing was born in Dundee on 12 August 1994 and grew up in Balgay where she was educated at Ancrum Road Primary School and then Harris Academy in Dundee. In 2007, Laing competed in the sixth series of Raven on CBBC, coming fifth whilst competing in the first week.

While growing up she became interested in rave music due to the influence of her parents, and worked as a DJ for the first time in an Arbroath venue when aged 18.

While developing her musical career, including a DJ residency in San Antonio, she worked as a dental nurse for 10 years until quitting the profession following a well received performance at Creamfields in 2022. She has spoken publicly about balancing full-time work and weekend touring during this period, describing the transition to full-time music as both "terrifying and freeing".

Laing has performed sets at several events including TRNSMT, Creamfields, the Tidy Weekender, and as a supporting act for Idris Elba in Ibiza. In 2022 she performed at the BBC Radio 1 Big Weekend after coming to the attention of Radio 1 DJs including Pete Tong and Danny Howard, and she went on to be the headline act on the dance stage at the 2023 event. She has also appeared on several BBC Radio 1 shows and guest mixes, helping to expand her profile across mainstream UK dance audiences.

=== 2019–2024: Breakthrough and launching Doof ===
In 2019, she remixed the Sophie Ellis-Bextor hit "Murder on the Dancefloor", which received acclaim and went on to be included in DJ sets worldwide. In 2023 her single Good Love, released with RoRo, spent 26 weeks in the UK Singles Chart. It peaked at number 7, and was certified Platinum by the British Phonographic Industry. Also in 2023, Laing was featured on the Tidy Trax album TDV25 - The Remixes, released to commemorate the 25 year anniversary of the death of hard house pioneer Tony De Vit.

Laing has launched her own record label, called Doof, it is named after what she calls the type of music she plays, based upon the sound of the "doof doof" beat. In July 2024, Laing released the 6–track extended play Into the Doof. The result of a 3–day collaboration with other DJs, she said the EP reflects "all the different styles I love".

=== 2025–present: Into the Bounce, HI Ibiza residency and Doof in the Park ===
In July 2025, Laing launched the inaugural Doof in the Park festival at Camperdown Country Park in Dundee. The one-day electronic music event attracted around 15,000 attendees and featured performances across multiple stages, with artists including Armin van Buuren, Judge Jules, Lisa Lashes and Laing herself headlining. The festival received positive coverage for showcasing Dundee’s growing role in Scotland’s electronic music scene. The festival was confirmed to return in 2026 following the conclusion of the inaugural event. The event was widely seen as a landmark moment for the city’s contemporary music culture, marking one of the largest electronic music gatherings ever held in Dundee.

In the same year, Laing began a residency at Hï Ibiza, performing across multiple dates during the summer season. She also released her second EP titled Into the Bounce. Laing released "Have You Ever Loved (Ellie)" in November 2025, in tribute to her best friend who had died earlier in the year, the single was given the Hottest Record accolade by BBC Radio 1 on the day of its release.

== Discography ==
=== Extended plays ===
List of EPs, with selected details
Title	Details
Into the Doof	Released: 24 July 2024; Label: WUGD
Into the Bounce	Released: 4 July 2025; Label: WUGD

=== Singles ===
Title	Label	Year	Peak chart positions		Certifications	Album
Title	Label	Year	UK	IRE	Certifications	Album
"Coco"	—	2014	—	—		Non-album singles
"My House"	—	2015	—	—		Non-album singles
"Space"	—	2015	—	—		Non-album singles
"Murder on the Dancefloor"	Spinnin Deep	2021	—	—		Non-album singles
"Climax"	—	2022	—	—		Non-album singles
"Don't Wanna Go" (with Stephen Kirkwood)	—	2022	—	—		Non-album singles
"Be the One"	WUGD	2023	—	—		Non-album singles
"Get Busy"	Trick	2023	—	—		Non-album singles
"Good Love" (with RoRo)	WUGD	2023	7	4	BPI Platinum	Non-album singles
"Party All the Time"	WUGD	2023	51	27	BPI Silver	Non-album singles
"FWTDJ (All Night Long)"	Doof	2024	—	45		Non-album singles
"Bouncing Ball" (with Reinier Zonneveld and PUSH)	Polydor Records	2024	—	—		Into the Doof
"I Need It More"	WUGD	2024	—	—		Into the Doof
"Tell Me" (with The Fairground)	Polydor Records	2024	—	—		Into the Doof
"Stay" (with Jem Cooke)	Polydor Records	2024	—	—		Into the Doof
"Poppin'"	Polydor Records	2024	—	—		Into the Doof
"Ibizacore" (with Muki)	Polydor Records	2024	—	—		Into the Doof
"4am in a Rave" (with Rhys from the Sticks)	Doof	2025	—	—		Non-album singles
"Bass Boys"	WUGD	2025	—	90		Non-album singles
"Love is a Drug" (with Charlie Sparks)	Doof	2025	—	—		Into the Bounce
"Pedicure Princess"	Doof	2025	—	—		Into the Bounce
"OMG" (with Shlomo)	Doof	2025	—	—		Into the Bounce
"Rewind" (with The Rocketman)	Doof	2025	—	—		Non-album singles
"Have You Ever Loved (Ellie)" (with Hannah Boleyn)	Doof	2025	—	—		Non-album singles
"Stomp Your Feet" (with Marlon Hoffstadt and Caroline Roxy)	Doof	2026	—	—		Non-album singles
"U Got 2 Know" (with Armin van Buuren and Wippenberg)	Armada Music	2026	—	—		A State of Trance 2026
"New Bass New Kick" (with Bassjackers)	Doof	2026	—	—		Non-album singles

== Awards and nominations ==
Year	Award	Category	Nominated work	Result
2023	DJ Mag Best of British Awards	Best Track	"Party All the Time" (with HVRR)	Nominated
2024	Specsavers Scottish Music Awards	Go Radio Breakthrough Award	Hannah Laing	Won
2025	DJ Awards	Hard Dance / Bounce	Hannah Laing	Won

In 2023, 2024 and 2025, Laing received BBC Radio 1 “Hottest Record” designations for “Good Love”, “FWTDJ” and “Have You Ever Loved (Ellie)” respectively.
