= Nick Bright =

British Radio and television presenter

Nick Bright is a British radio and television presenter. He is best known for having hosted a variety of shows on BBC Radio 1Xtra. He has also been involved with other projects, including for BBC Sport, BBC Radio 5 Live, MTV's Official UK Top 40 and Arsenal Matchday Show.

== Early life ==
Born at Mayday Hospital in Croydon, his father is half Ghanaian and his mother is English. He grew up in South Norwood, London. He is a supporter of Arsenal F.C.

He was educated at St Joseph’s College in south London before his family relocated to Portsmouth where he attended St Luke's School. He went on to study music technology at South Downs College and then completed a degree in Radio Production at the University Of Westminster.

== Career ==
In April 2010, Bright began presenting on BBC Radio 1Xtra launching a brand new early breakfast show (4 am – 7 am Monday to Saturday). Since then he moved to the Weekend Breakfast show (7 – 10 am) and then to Saturdays and Sundays 10 am – 1 pm. In August 2018 he joined BBC Radio 5 Live presenting a show called The Squad on Sundays at midday. This meant he could no longer present his Sunday show on 1Xtra. On 23 December 2025, it was revealed that Bright would leave 1Xtra altogether after 16 years on 3 January 2026, the date of his final show.

Alongside his radio commitments, Bright also does some TV presenting hosting the FA People’s Cup for BBC Sport since 2015 and the 2017 World Cup Of Pool on Sky Sports. In summer 2018 he fronted a new World Cup chat show for BBC Sport called Barbershop Ballers in which he and his panel of guests discussed the days matches.

For the 2018/19 Premier League season he was confirmed as one of the presenters of the Arsenal Matchday Show called Arsenal Nation Live.

He had a brief stint as grime artist Lethal Bizzle’s tour DJ.
