= DJ Cameo =

- Genres: Grime, UK garage
- Occupation: DJ
- Website: djcameo.com

DJ Cameo is an English DJ and former host of "Pirate Sessions", a now-defunct Sunday afternoon grime show on the digital UK radio station BBC 1Xtra. He later hosted the Tuesday night UKG show, but on 4 November 2015 it was announced that he would be replaced by a new DJ called Jamz Supernova who would be playing R&B. The music Cameo produces varies from 2-step vocals, to 4x4, to grime, and sublow. In 2004, Cameo was voted winner of the "Best Newcomer" Award for the garage scene's 2004 Peoples Choice Awards held in London. Cameo also received two back to back awards on behalf of Uptown Records, winner of best record shop.

== Biography ==
DJ Cameo began his DJing career in 1997 playing in local bars and clubs in West London. His main influences at that time were Tuff Jam, EZ and the Dreem Teem. In March 1999, Cameo landed a set on London's 92.5 Taste FM alongside MCs Mr. Kaos and Double G, together collectively known as The Specialist Crew and later Special Edition. In their weekly 4pm–6pm Sunday show, they were amongst the early pioneers of a changing scene and introduced the concept of 'radio raving' with 2 MCs effectively 'bringing a rave into your living room'. This allowed Cameo to be heard on the UK underground music scene and to gain experience in working on a radio station. With success on Taste FM, Cameo also featured on other pirate stations such as Delight FM, Ice FM and Lush FM.

In 2001, he secured a job at Uptown Records, a European underground music store and has since been promoted to head buyer for the UK garage department. That same year, Cameo teamed up with Danny C and MC Viper to produce "Addicted". Cameo then got involved with producer J-Sweet to produce the underground track "Hi Grade" featuring Mr. Kaos and Double G that was then signed to the MOBO 2002 compilation, and more recently the 2003 garage anthem "Original Bad Girl Style" featuring Gemma Fox for Ministry of Sound's Street Beats compilation.

In October 2005, Cameo started his own label, On A Level, and Kamikaze Recordings working with artists such as Jon E Cash, DaVinChe, Terror Danger, P-Jam, Dexplicit, Vital, Delinquent, TnT, J-Sweet, IMP, Jiggalo, Black Jack and Scandalous. Also in 2005, the Garage Anthems CD compilation, mixed by Cameo was released on Virgin Records. Cameo went on to become head A&R of Def Jam mobile, a ringtone company offering UK and US tracks for download. That same year, Cameo promoted his Hot Off The Block Grime Allstars concert tour alongside Rebecka Prochnik. It showcased established and new UKG talent in a live concert format enabling fans around the world to truly experience the UKG phenomena on their doorstep. A world tour was set up with dates in New York, Germany, Spain, Sweden and Paris. The UK was also covered with dates at Glastonbury Festival, V Festival, Cargo and various universities. The tour included acts such as Crazy Titch & J2K, Lethal B, Roll Deep, JME, Skepta, Bruza, No Lay, L Man, Purple and Tinchy Stryder, to name a few. It aimed to take the UKG scene to another level providing artists and producers with unlimited global exposure.

In early 2006, on behalf of 1xtra and BBC Radio 3, Cameo hosted Urban Classic, a music event which brought urban street stars such as Bruza Purple Pace Tor, Faith Sfx and Davinche together with the BBC Symphony Orchestra for a performance at the Hackney Empire. Cameo also appeared on the TV drama series Dubplate Drama.

== Discography ==
- Garage Anthems 2005
- The Sound of the Pirates
- DJ Cameo Presents Bassline
- Black Heart EP (2015)
