= Ben Hemsley =

British trance music disc jockey and record producer (born 1996)

- Born: June 6, 1996 (age 29)
- Origin: Newcastle upon Tyne
- Genres: trance, rave, happy hardcore
- Occupation(s): Record producer, Disc Jockey
- Years active: 2019 -
- Labels: Ministry of Sound, bebé
- Website: benhemsley.com

Ben Hemsley (born 1996) is a British electronic dance music disc jockey and record producer. He won the DJ Mag Best Producer award in 2023, and has performed at events such as Creamfields and for the BBC Radio 1 Essential Mix show.

== Early life ==
Hemsley grew up in North Shields, near Newcastle upon Tyne, where he had an interest in music from the age of 12. By the age of 14 he was performing DJ sets at under-18 events.

== Career ==
Hemsley initially achieved wider attention with his single release on the Repopulate Mars label, "Caress Me", which made number 15 in the Beatport chart and was played by Radio 1 DJ Danny Howard. Hemsley was considered a "local DJ" until he came to prominence in 2021 when, due to the restrictions on travel from the COVID-19 pandemic meaning European artists could not perform, he was booked to perform in front of 8,000 people at Creamfields. His set was well received, and he went on to play the same festival the following year to a much larger crowd.

In October 2022 he performed a 2-hour Essential Mix on the Pete Tong show for BBC Radio 1. Also in 2022, Hemsley started a new record label, bebé, with the first release being his own extended player, "EP1". In 2023 Hemsley won the Best Producer category in the DJ Mag Best of British awards, which was voted for by the public. He has toured across the UK, and in the summer of 2023 had a residency at Ibiza Rocks in San Antonio. In April 2024 it was announced that Hemsley was going to join the BBC Radio 1 Residency series. He hosted his first show, dedicated to Ibiza, the same day as his birthday on 6 June 2024.

In September 2025, Hemsley released the single "If Your Girl", which heavily interpolates American singer Aaliyah's 1996 single "If Your Girl Only Knew". The single debuted at number 12 on the UK Singles Downloads Chart on 12 September 2025.

Hemsley's sound has been described in the music press as "nostalgic rave" that cannot be easily categorised, but with trance lying at the "very heart of his current production".

On 20 October 2025, Hemsley announced via Facebook that he is working on his debut album, which is set to be released in 2026.

== Discography ==
=== Studio albums ===
Title	Details
TBC	Released: 2026; Formats: TBC; Label: TBC

=== Extended plays ===
Title	Details
Strength in Life	Released: 4 September 2020; Formats: Digital download, streaming; Label: Sola
King of Darkness	Released: 13 November 2020; Formats: Digital download, streaming; Label: Trick
We Are Sound	Released: 16 April 2021; Formats: Digital download, streaming; Label: Sola
Golden Buddha	Released: 13 August 2021; Formats: Digital download, streaming; Label: Material Music
EP 1	Released: 22 April 2022; Formats: Digital download, streaming; Label: bebé

=== Singles ===
Title	Year	Peak chart positions	Album
Title	Year	UK	Album
"Caress Me"	2019	—	Non-album singles
"NE29"	2019	—	Non-album singles
"Snowdons Tune"	2020	—	Non-album singles
"Blind"	2020	—	Non-album singles
"Through 2 You"	2021	—	Non-album singles
"I Feel Love"	2021	—	Non-album singles
"Bebé Música"	2021	—	Golden Buddha (EP)
"Love, Peace & Harmony"	2021	—	Non-album singles
"Erase Me"	2022	—	Non-album singles
"Every Little Thing"	2023	—	Non-album singles
"IBIZA"	2023	—	Non-album singles
"Benirrás"	2023	—	Non-album singles
"Closer" (featuring Chenai Zinyuku)	2024	—	Non-album singles
"Tidal" (featuring Rose Gray)	2024	—	Non-album singles
"Is It Beautiful?" (with Armin van Buuren, featuring Lucy Pullin)	2025	—	Non-album singles
"Angel"	2025	—	Non-album singles
"If Your Girl" (with Gaskin)	2025	— (Note: "If Your Girl" did not enter the Singles Chart, but peaked at No. 14 on the Singles Sales Chart, and No. 12 on the Singles Downloads Chart.)	Non-album singles

=== Music videos ===
Title	Year	Director(s)
"Angel"	2025	Jay Douglas
