= Esme Emerson =

English musical duo

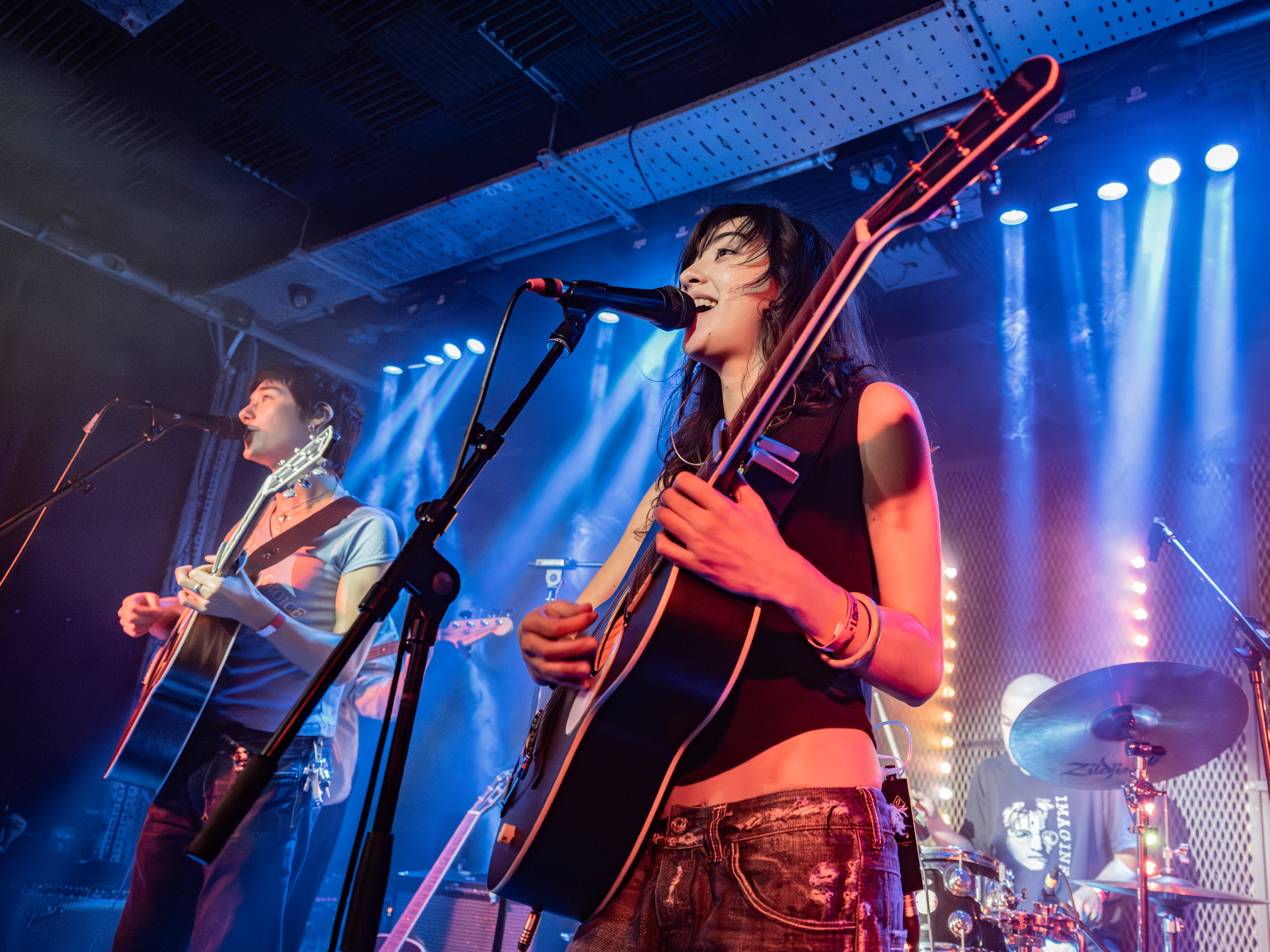
- At The Camden Assembly, London, 12 September 2025

Background information
- Origin: Ipswich, Suffolk, England
- Genres: Indie pop; indie folk; folk pop; pop rock
- Years active: 2020–present
- Labels: Communion Records; Infinite Future MGMT
- Members: Esme Lee-Scott; Emerson Lee-Scott
- Website: www.esmeemerson.co.uk

Esme Emerson are a British-Chinese music duo consisting of siblings Esme Lee-Scott (born 2002/2003) and Emerson Lee-Scott (born 1998/1999). After releasing their debut LP S for Sugar, D for Dog (2022), the duo signed with Communion Records, through which they released the EPs Big Leap, No Faith, Small Chancer (2024) and Applesauce (2025).

== Background ==
Emerson and Esme were born in Ipswich and grew up in Brantham on the Suffolk–Essex border. They are of British and Chinese heritage. As teenagers during school holidays, the two siblings took part in local Ipswich rock schools. Emerson graduated with a degree in Music from the University of Sheffield in 2020, when Esme was in the midst of her A Levels. It was around this time that they began making music together.

== Career ==
After uploading a video of herself singing to TikTok, Esme was contacted by production duo Future Cut, who would mentor Esme and Emerson. Esme Emerson released their debut single "Words" in 2021 and then "Eighteen" and "Better This Time", which earned radio play via BBC Introducing. The duo had their first live gigs with Luca Wilding and supporting Miya Miya. Future Cut encouraged the duo to write a new song a week, which formed the basis of Esme Emerson's seven-track debut LP S is for Sugar, D is for Dog, published in 2022 under Infinite Future Management.

In March 2024, Esme Emerson signed with Communion Records, through which they released the EP Big Leap, No Faith, Small Chancer and the accompanying inaugural singles "Please", "Show You (Truck Song)", "Afraid of Losing" and "Fade Out". Esme Emerson supported The Japanese House on tour in May and Keane for a special concert in August, featured on the Introducing stage at Latitude Festival, and had their first headline London show at Folklore Hoxton in October. They also featured at the Neighbourhood Festival and had gigs with the likes of Jasmine Jethwa, Sarah Julia, and Good Neighbours.

Ahead of the release of their next EP Applesauce in March 2025 were the previewed tracks "Yard" and "Together" in autumn 2024, and "Too Far Gone" and "Stay" in early 2025. They joined BoyWithUke for three Europe tour dates before embarking on their own headline tour.

In summer 2025, they performed as the opening support act for Ed Sheeran’s homecoming concert at Portman Road, Ipswich Stadium - of their hometown.

== Artistry ==
The siblings grew up listening to an array of music through their parents, including bands The Cure, Joy Division, The Killers Echo and The Bunnymen, The Smiths and Pussy Cat Dolls, and solo artists Sadé and Beyoncé. Emerson named indie acts Bombay Bicycle Club, Two Door Cinema Club and Bon Iver as formative influences, the former being the first band "I found myself and fell in love". When promoting their debut LP S for Sugar, D for Dog in 2022, Alt-J, Sigur Rós, Phoebe Bridgers, RY X and K-pop were cited as influences.

Across 2024 and 2025, Emerson praised Oklou and Charli XCX, while also referencing Dreamer Boy, Frost Children, and Ryuichi Sakamoto. Artists Esme mentioned included Hovvdy, Big Thief, Dijon, and Adrianne Lenker.

In addition, Esme oil paints the duo's album covers.

Ben Jolley identified Esme Emerson as part of a group of "guitar-playing singer-songwriters making acoustic music cool again" in his March 2024 article for Guitar. Matty Powell in his review of Applesauce compared Esme Emerson to Alvvays.

== Discography ==
=== LPs ===
- S for Sugar, D for Dog (2022)
- It's All Just Noise (2026)

=== EPs ===
- Big Leap, No Faith, Small Chancer (2024)
- Applesauce (2025)

=== Singles ===
- "Words" (2021)
- "Eighteen" (2022)
- "Better This Time" (2022)
- "Please" (2024)
- "Show You (Truck Song)" (2024)
- "Afraid of Losing" (2024)
- "Fade Out" (2024)
- "Yard" (2024)
- "Together" (2024)
- "Too Far Gone" (2025)
- "Stay" (2025)
- "Centipede" (2025)
- "Jackie" (2026)

=== Music videos ===
Year	Title	Director
2021	"Words"	
2022	"Eighteen"	
2022	"Better This Time"	
2023	"Running (Back to You)"	
2023	"Look Down / Scared of Falling"	
2024	"Please"	
2024	"Show You (Truck Song)"	Bertie Gilbert
2024	"Afraid of Losing"	Louise and Margot Infanti (animated)
2024	"Fade Out"	Bertie Gilbert
2024	"Yard"	Esme Lee-Scott
2024	"Together"	Esme Lee-Scott
2025	"Too Far Gone"	Esme Lee-Scott
2025	"Stay"	Esme Lee-Scott
2026	"Jackie"	Esme Lee-Scott
