= Racing Glaciers =

English rock band

- Origin: Macclesfield, England
- Genres: Alternative rock, post rock
- Years active: 2012–present
- Members: Tim Monaghan; Danny Thorpe; Matt Scheepers; Simon John; Matt Welch

Racing Glaciers are an English rock band which formed in the summer of 2012. The band members include Tim Monaghan, Danny Thorpe, Matt Scheepers, Simon John, and Matt Welch.

== Discography ==
Albums

- Caught in the Strange (2016)

EPs

- Racing Glaciers (2012)
- Ahead of You Forever (2014)
- Don't Wait For Me (2014)

Singles

- Moths (2014)
- First Light (2014)
- V H S (2014)
- What I Saw (2015)
- Seems Like a Good Time (2015)
- Summer Gun (2024)
