= DJ Semtex =

British radio DJ

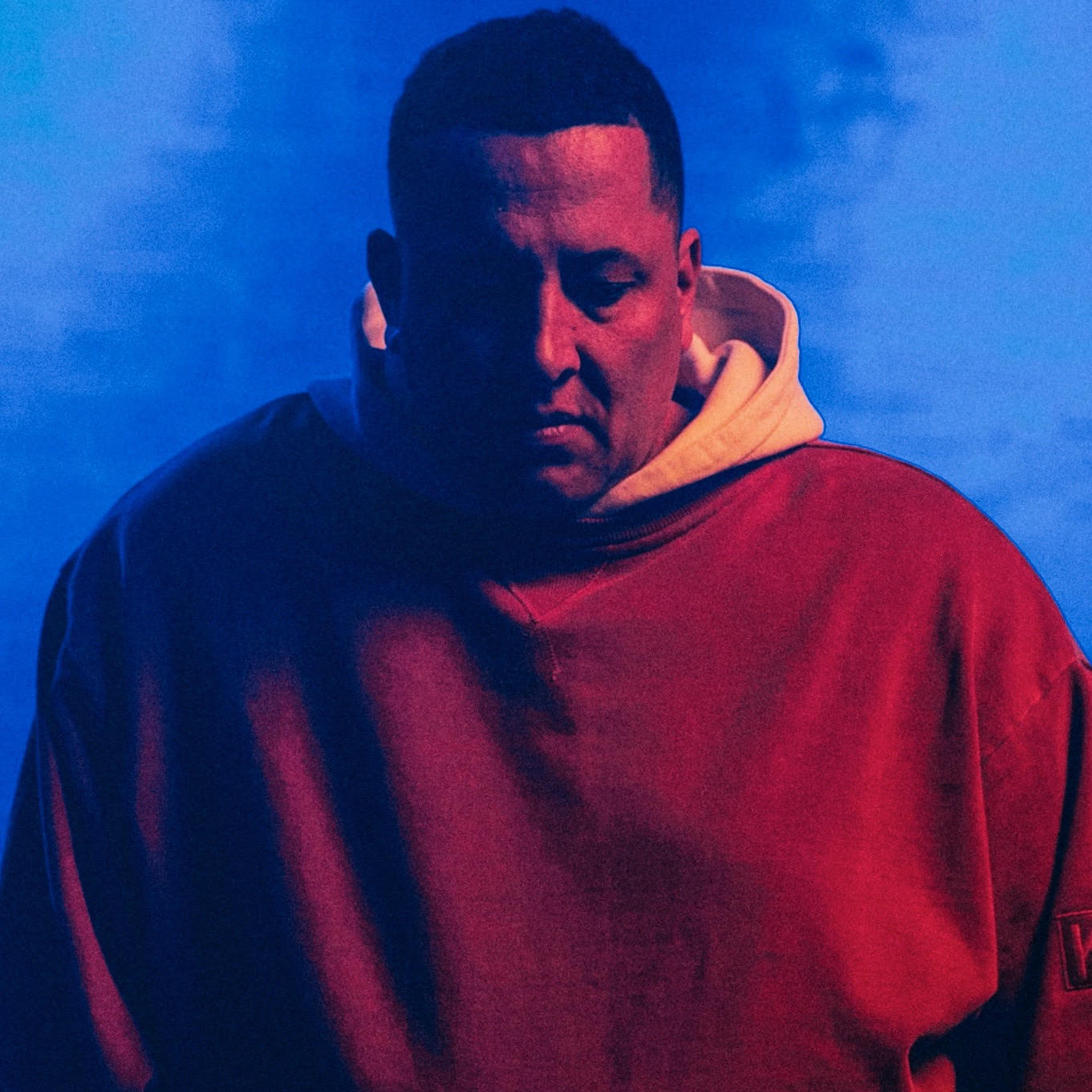

Background information
- Born: John Fairbanks; Manchester, England
- Genres: Hip hop, grime, British rap
- Occupations: DJ, broadcaster, author
- Website: djsemtex.com

DJ Semtex, born John Fairbanks, is an English DJ, author, radio DJ and presenter of Spotify's Who We Be podcast. Between 2002 and 2018, he was presenter for BBC Radio 1Xtra's weekly hip-hop show.

== Biography ==
Due to complications from lymphangioma at the age of 16, DJ Semtex had an arm amputated. He did not confirm this until his 2016 autobiography and previously refused to answer questions on the subject.

He began his career by promoting parties in Manchester while playing at the city's music venues such as The Haçienda.

In 2002, DJ Semtex began hosting a Friday night show (21:00 to 23:00) on BBC Radio 1Xtra.

He was Dizzee Rascal's official tour DJ in 2008, a role in which he also performed video DJing and scratching with his mouth.

As an interviewer, he interviewed J. Cole shortly before the release of his debut album in 2010, DJ Khaled at his L.A. home in 2017, and conducted the only UK interview with Skepta upon the release of his album Konnichiwa. In 2009, Drake's first UK interview was with DJ Semtex; Drake had a follow-up interview with DJ Semtex that went viral and was covered by Rolling Stone, Billboard and The New Yorker. When Drake launched his ‘More Life’ project in London in early 2017, he discussed it with DJ Semtex.

His debut as an author, Hip Hop Raised Me (2016), was well received, with co-signs from Drake, Chance the Rapper, Ghostface Killah, and Redman. It has been translated into French, German and Italian.

In 2018, DJ Semtex announced he was leaving 1Xtra after 15 years working for the station and took his Friday night hip hop show to Capital XTRA.

Launched in early 2018, Semtex is the host of Spotify's bi-weekly Who We Be podcast. The show focuses on hip hop, British rap, grime, and Afrobeats, including interviews with musicians. Past guests include Joe Budden, Future, French Montana, Giggs, Dave, AJ Tracey, and Davido.

Chuck D has said "DJ Semtex is a "generator of generations."
