= Fish56Octagon =

British disc jockey

Background information
- Born: 1979 or 1980 (age 46–47)
- Origin: London
- Genres: Electronic dance music
- Occupations: Disc Jockey, Marketer
- Instrument: turntable

Instagram information
- Page: Fish56Octagon
- Followers: 649,000 (7 December 2024)

TikTok information
- Page: Fish56Octagon
- Followers: 443,000

Fish56Octagon (born 1979 or 1980) is a British electronic dance music disc jockey and marketing professional. He gained a social media following due to his videos exhibiting his enthusiasm for dance music, typically while wearing a dressing gown. Since gaining popularity he has played live sets at several notable events including Creamfields, Boomtown and Glastonbury Festival.

== Biography ==
Following formal education Fish56Octagon, sometimes known as Fish, worked in the marketing industry in a variety of sectors.

During lockdown Fish started making TikTok videos, giving automobile and insurance advice and tips to drivers. In 2023/2024 he changed the focus of his videos to depict himself playing different genres of electronic music, including speed garage, rave and psy-trance, often in domestic scenarios. Subsequently Fish56Octagon gained a cult following, largely by "sharing his infectious love for all electronic music genres", and accumulated c. 500,000 followers on Instagram. It has been reported that his success has been dismissed by rave "know-it-alls", however Fish has responded saying "that you can just put yourself out there and not care what other people think".

In May 2024 Glastonbury festival announced a tribute to DJ Annie Nightingale, to be held that year at the Glade stage, that featured Fish playing a DJ set with music favoured by Nightingale. He headlined the Pepsi Max trance tent at Creamfields the same year, reportedly attracting a substantial crowd. Fish made his Scottish live debut in September 2024, playing at the SWG3 club. His performance at the 2024 Parklife festival was reviewed as "one of the highlight sets". He also had a sold-out tour in the United Kingdom in the summer of 2024, and was scheduled to play at the Beyond the Valley festival in Australia.

In June 2024 the Guardian reported that Fish56Octagon is not his real name, and that he is reluctant to reveal what it is. In August 2024 it was reported that Fish had quit the "day job" in order to focus on his live music career.

The Octagon Discs record label was launched by Fish in September 2024, with the first release a remix of Superstylin' by Declan Knapp.

== Personal life ==
Fish lives in Southeast England with his wife and two children.
