= Robbo Ranx =

British broadcaster and DJ

Roger Robinson, better known as Robbo Ranx, is a UK dancehall and reggae DJ. He presented shows on BBC Radio 1Xtra for twelve years. 2023 to 2025 Showcasing a show on The Beat London 103.6fm every Friday

== Career ==
Born in Northwest London, Ranx won three Sony Radio Awards for the best weekly show and two for best live event. He interviewed a variety of reggae artists, including Sizzla's first ever radio interview, as well as Buju Banton, Capleton and Bounty Killer. He also presented the weekly Dancehall music TV show Turn it Up on the UK’s Channel U music network.

Robbo Ranx early introduction to music was through the Tippertone sound system in the late 80's, which he co-founded with a school friend.

In 1989 he set up the record label Musik Street, recording and releasing tracks by artists such as General Levy, Sweetie Irie, Chuckie Star, Bobo General, Junior Dan and Jack Radics between 1989 and 1996.

In 1994 he helped to form Skyline FM, a pirate radio station in west London. The success of the station led to Robbo Ranx hosting Unique FM's The Street Experience, a weekly show reflecting the reggae music scene. In 2000, he left the pirate radio scene and joined Choice FM to host a weekly reggae dancehall show.

In 1998, Ranx took Dancehall to London’s west and held down an 11-year residency with his weekly ‘Uptown Splurt’ parties at Cameo’s Nights Club. Pulling audience of 400 plus hosting act such as Sean Paul, Elephant Man, Shaggy, Stonelove and Bass Odyssey.

After a short spell on London's Choice FM, in 2002 Robbo Ranx joined BBC Radio 1Xtra a digital radio station that was launched on the DAB Digital Radio platform. He hosted the 'Dancehall Splurt' radio show twice a week. In 2004, he won two Sony Radio Academy Awards for his weekly radio show and 1Xtra's broadcast of Sting 2003, one Jamaica's biggest dancehall festival.

He left 1Xtra in 2014 and launched his own online radio network Robbo Ranx Radio in October 2014.

Online streaming platform Mixcloud awarded Robbo Ranx the Best Online Music Show 2018 for his Dancehall 360 weekly program.

== BBC 1Xtra ==
Robbo Ranx previously presented the weekly Dancehall show on BBC Radio 1Xtra

== Choice FM 107.1 ==
Robbo Ranx previously presented a weekly show on London's Choice FM's 107.1 frequency
