= BBC Radio 1Xtra =

British national radio station

- Logo used since 2021
- London and Birmingham; United Kingdom
- Frequencies: DAB: 12B (BBC National DAB); Freeview: 701; Freesat: 701; Sky UK: 0124; Virgin Media: 907; Astra 2E (28.2°E) satellite Intelsat 901 (18°W) satellite

Programming
- Language: English
- Format: Rhythmic CHR/Urban contemporary

Ownership
- Owner: BBC
- Sister stations: BBC Radio 1 BBC Radio 1 Dance; BBC Radio 1 Anthems

History
- First air date: 16 August 2002; 24 years ago

Technical information
- Licensing authority: Ofcom

Links
- Website: BBC Radio 1Xtra via BBC Sounds

BBC Radio 1Xtra is a British digital radio station owned and operated by the BBC. It broadcasts Black music and urban music genres, and is a sister station to Radio 1. Launching at 18:00 on 16 August 2002, it had been code named "Network X" during the consultation period. At the time, the station was listed as "1 Xtra BBC" on many electronic programming guides. The station broadcasts from the 8th floor of Broadcasting House in London, shared with Radio 1, Radio 2 and 6 Music, and from studios in The Mailbox in Birmingham, shared with Asian Network.

According to RAJAR, the station broadcasts to a weekly audience of 786,000 with a listening share of 0.3% as of March 2024.

== Music policy ==
BBC Radio 1Xtra's music includes largely British, North American, Caribbean and African hip-hop, rap, grime, drill, trap, jungle, UK garage, dubstep, drum and bass, UK funky, house, R&B, soul, urban, gospel, dancehall, soca, reggae, Afrobeats, amapiano and bhangra. It is available on BBC Sounds, digital radio (DAB) and digital television. The first ever track played on 1Xtra was a specially created track produced by DJ Skitz and Rodney P and featuring Beverley Knight and Blak Twang. The five-hour show was presented by the Rampage DJ collective and the station's then breakfast show host, KC.

== News and speech ==
As part of its public service broadcasting remit, 1Xtra is required to carry a significant amount of news, information and speech content. 1Xtra had its own news service, 1Xtra News (formerly known as "TX"), which was operated as a subsidiary of Radio 1's Newsbeat operations. The tone and style of the news presentation is in keeping with the station's overall target audience - young and predominantly urban.

Initially, in addition to regular hourly bulletins, TX had a flagship weekday two-hour news, features and discussion show under the title "TX Unltd" (pronounced "Unlimited"). This show - initially broadcast in a 5 pm – 7 pm slot - rated poorly, however, and was later absorbed into a mixed music-and-speech format (similar to that used by Jeremy Vine on Radio 2) which aired in mid-afternoon (2 pm – 4 pm) and was named after its host, Max.

In 2009, the BBC Trust agreed to a further change to the scheduling of news content on 1Xtra, such that it could use the same format successfully operated by Radio 1's Newsbeat: two 15-minute news bulletins, one in the middle of the day and another in the early evening, with other speech features, profiles and social/cultural specials being broadcast on an ad hoc basis within music-led shows, and with regular hourly news bulletins also continuing. The Trust required that 1Xtra's main bulletins not air at the same time as those on Radio 1. When the new bulletins were introduced in late summer 2009, they aired at noon and 5 pm, with Radio 1's bulletins remaining at 12:45 pm and 5:45 pm.

As of Summer 2009 it was reported that Radio 1 and 1Xtra were carrying shared news bulletins at weekends; weekday news output remained separate.

September 2012 saw a substantial increase in Newsbeat bulletins simulcast with Radio 1. Weekday breakfast bulletins at 6 am, 7.30 am, 8 am, 8.30 am and 9.30 am remain bespoke 1Xtra broadcasts. From 10:30 am, bulletins are shared with Radio 1, including the 15-minute Newsbeat magazines at 12:45 pm and 5:45 pm.

In the first quarter of 2011, 1Xtra was part of an efficiency review conducted by John Myers. His role, according to Andrew Harrison, the chief executive of RadioCentre, was "to identify both areas of best practice and possible savings."

In November 2017, reports signalled that the Roundhouse Rising concert series would partner with 1Xtra. As part of the change, the BBC curated a free grime night in the venue's Sackler Space.

== Audience profile ==
BBC Radio 1Xtra's typical audience is between fifteen and thirty years old.

According to the "Submission to the Secretary of State's review of digital channels" in March 2004, Radio 1Xtra "provides music output 24 hours a day, punctuated by bespoke BBC news bulletins and other speech output designed specifically to be pertinent to the audience."

== Notable presenters ==
=== Current notable presenters ===
- Kenny Allstar
- Eddie Kadi
- Nadia Jae
- Trevor Nelson
- David Rodigan
- Snoochie Shy
- Sir Spyro
- DJ Target
- Heartless Crew
- Remi Burgz

Weekday evening shows began with MistaJam helming a three-hour multi-genre show, followed by six hours of specialist output tailored to a particular genre (e.g. UK Garage, dancehall, etc.) Between October 2009 and spring 2010, the 4 am – 6 am slot housed a replay of selected weekend specialist programming; this and the one-hour Morning Mix programme were dropped in spring 2010 and a new six-days-a-week 'early breakfast' show (4 am – 7 am) hosted by Nick Bright was introduced. (The Saturday 4 am replay of Target's Friday night show was also axed, to make room for Bright's sixth show) This has now itself been replaced by a rerun of the previous week's overnight mix show from 4 am to 6 am, giving nine hours of specialist output.

Weekday overnights (1 am – 3 am), Saturday overnights (1 am – 4 am) and Saturday evenings (7 pm – 1 am) are now simulcast entirely with Radio 1 - this allows Radio 1's flagship urban content to air on 1Xtra.

=== Former notable presenters ===
- A. Dot
- Clara Amfo
- Adele Roberts
- Aftershock (Terror Danjah and Scratcha DVA)
- Sarah-Jane Crawford
- Gemma Cairney
- Benji B
- Nick Bright
- Tiffany Calver
- Reggie Yates
- Ronnie Herel
- DJ Cameo
- DJ Diggz
- Devin Griffin
- Kelly Rowland
- Ms. Dynamite
- Zena McNally
- Tim Westwood
- Crissy Criss
- DJ Blakey
- Matthew Xia
- DJ Q
- Rodney P
- DJ Skitz
- Ras Kwame
- Robbo Ranx
- Friction
- Panjabi Hit Squad
- Semtex
- Charlie Sloth
- MistaJam
- Toddla T
- Diplo
- René LaVice
- Annie Nightingale
- Yasmin Evans
- Cuppy
- Lady Leshurr
- Kaylee Golding

== Logo history ==
BBC Radio 1Xtra logo from its 16 August 2002 launch until 20 August 2007, known as "BBC 1Xtra".

BBC Radio 1Xtra logo from 20 August 2007 to 12 April 2010.

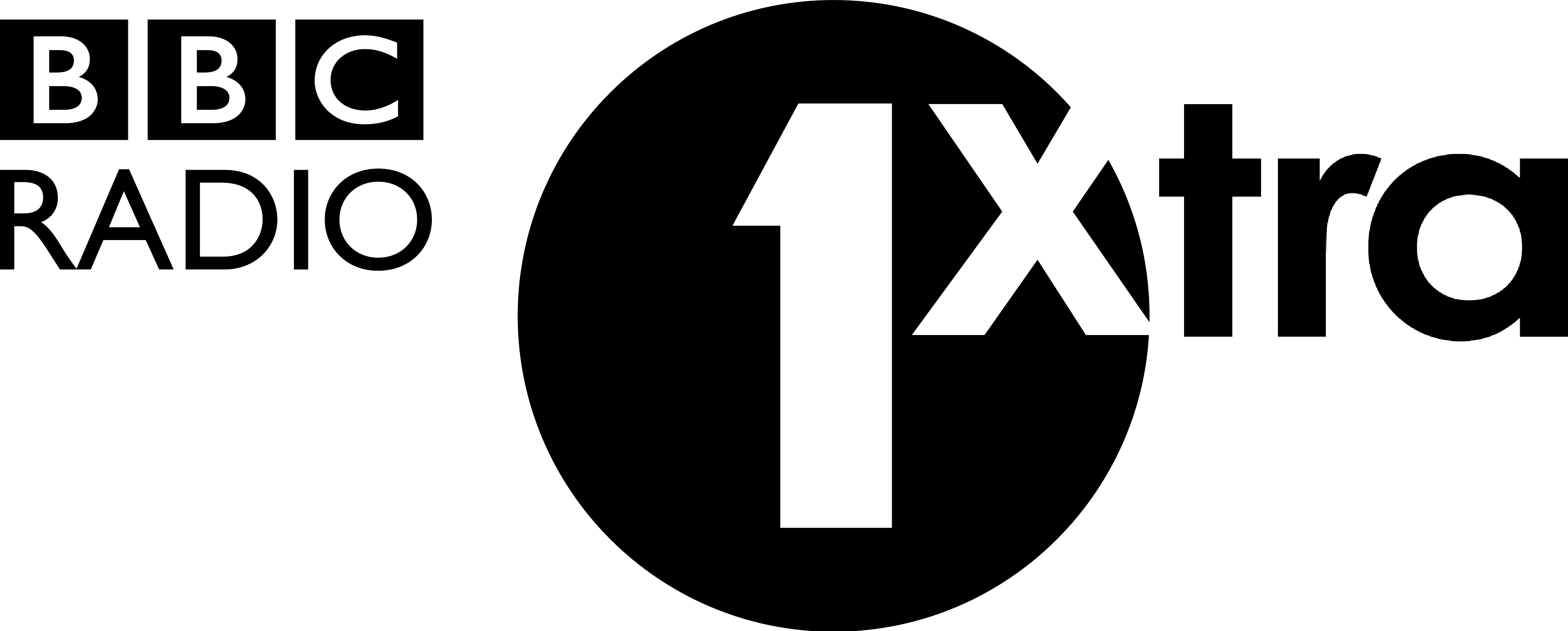
BBC Radio 1Xtra logo from 12 April 2010 to 14 January 2022.

BBC Radio 1Xtra logo since 14 January 2022.

== Sources ==
- "BBC 1Xtra". Archived from the original on 25 February 2007.
- Youngs, Ian (16 August 2003). "BBC NEWS - Entertainment - TV and Radio - 1Xtra celebrates birthday presence". BBC News.
