= Boardmasters Festival line-ups =

English music festival performer lineup

Boardmasters Festival is an annual music festival that takes place in Newquay, Cornwall in England. The following is a list of acts that have played at the festival. Headliners are listed in bold.

== 2026 ==
5-9 August 2026
Stage	Friday	Saturday	Sunday
**Main Stage**	**Fatboy Slim**, Carly Wilford, The Kooks, James Arthur, Dizzee Rascal, (Note: This act was billed as an "afternoon special guest".) Rose Gray, Take A Chance On Us, Fletchr Fletchr	**Lily Allen**, Carly Wilford, Nia Archives, Ren, Alessi Rose, Example, Kerr Mercer, Rock Choir Cornwall	**Kasabian**, Carly Wilford, Loyle Carner, Joy Crookes, Rudimental, Tinie Tempah, Asha Banks, Essy Sparrow
**Mordros**	The Lathums, The Royston Club, Lambrini Girls, Getdown Services, Cliffords, Etta Marcus, Finn Forster, with closing set from Fleetmac Wood	Pendulum, The Darkness, Keo, Florence Road, Radio Free Alice, The Guest List, The North, with closing set from DJ AG	Goldie, Brooke Combe, Chloe Qisha, Luvcat, Freddie Halkon, The Clause, Tom A. Smith, with closing set from Jam & Meme
**Unleashed**	Designate, K Motionz & IC3, HAMDI, 4am Kru, Charlotte Plank, Window Kid, SOTA, Dubtendo, TS7	La La, Ewan McVicar, Omar+, In Parallel, ATRIP, M'Lover, Spooky Cash-Cash	Hannah Wants, Girls Don't Sync, Sarah Story B2B Charlie Boon, Clementine Douglas, Bushbaby, Saint Ludo, Arthi, Owen Price
**The View**	Sasha Keable, Old Mervs, Chartreuse, Bella Barbe, Abbie Piper, (Note: This act was supported by BBC Introducing.) Jamie Yost, COSM, Ashley Harding, with after-dark set by Oh My God! It's The Church	Jacob Alon, Joshua Idehen, Charlie Noordewier, Dermot Henry, Liang Lawrence, Ben Kidson, Achilles Heel, Candar, Peri Rae, with after-dark set by Hot 8 Brass Band	Lucy Spraggan, Beans On Toast, Jack Cullen, Shay O'Dowd, Jaws The Shark, Twin Skeletons, Ronniee, 3 Days of Wonder

== 2025 ==
6-10 August 2025
Stage	Friday	Saturday	Sunday
**Main Stage**	**Raye**, The Wombats, Flo, Leigh-Anne, Kaiser Chiefs, (Note: This act was billed as an "afternoon special guest".) Keo, Take A Chance On Us	**Central Cee**, Nelly Furtado, Katy B, Rizzle Kicks, SONGER, Arthur Hill, Casey Lowery, Massaoke	**The Prodigy**, London Grammar, Myles Smith, Bob Vylan, Natasha Bedingfield, Bradley Simpson, Bongo's Bingo
**Mordros**	Interplanetary Criminal, Krept and Konan, Fat Dog, Alfie Templeman, Beth McCarthy, James Marriott, Polly Money, with closing sets by SimOne and Charlie Boon	Maribou State, Hard Life, Ocean Alley, Paris Paloma, DEADLETTER, Luvcat, Mia Kirkland, with closing set from Mike Skinner DJ	Wet Leg, Franz Ferdinand, Caity Baser, Flowdan, Gardna, Cassia, Mackenzy Mackay, Overpass, with closing set from Swiftogeddon
**Unleashed**	Bou & B Live 247, Bakey, Basslayerz, Biianco, Diffrent, Drop Squad, Emily Makis, Shapes, 1991	Patrick Topping, The Blessed Madonna, Crybaby, Danny Howard, D.O.D., In Parallel, Jazzy, Paige Tomlinson, Waze	Sub Focus, A Little Sound, Arielle Free, Charlie Tee, Dubtendo Allstars, Fleur Shore, Honeyluv, Zero B2B MPH, Badger
**The View**	Sports Team, Zach Templar, Fletchr Fletchr, Aaron Rowe, Superlate, (Note: This act was supported by BBC Introducing.) Bailey Tomkinson & The Locals, Kate Hall, with after-dark sets by Sally C and Lu.Re B2B Joshua James	Jeremy Loops, Newton Faulkner, Moreish Idols, Jack Dean, Malka, Kitty Crocker, Luke Marzec, with after-dark sets by Oppidan and Ahadadream	Maverick Sabre, Amie Blue, Ben Ellis, George Moir, Polly Money, Tummyache, Essy Sparrow, with after-dark sets by Salute and Dan Shake B2B Charlie Boon

== 2024 ==
7–11 August 2024
Stage	Friday	Saturday	Sunday
Main Stage	**Chase & Status (Live)**, Courteeners, Tom Odell, Soft Play, Good Neighbours, Āyanna, Take a Chance on Us	**Sam Fender**, Becky Hill, Declan McKenna, Holly Humberstone, Wunderhorse	**Stormzy**, The Streets, Cat Burns, Kate Nash, Ragz Originale
The Land of Saints	Bicep pres. Chroma (DJ Set, cancelled due to personal circumstances), Kenya Grace, AntsLive, Master Peace, NewDad, Corella, Closing Party from Fleetmac Wood	Nia Archives, Ghetts, Professor Green, Antony Szmierek, Sprints, Bilk, Closing Party from DJ Luck & MC Neat	Maisie Peters, Overmono, Future Utopia, Los Bitchos, English Teacher, Tors, Strandz, BBY, Closing Party from Swiftogeddon
Unleashed	Girls Don't Sync, Billy Gillies, Charlotte Plank, Clementine Douglas, Gok Wan, Jazzy, Charlie Boon	Hannah Laing, Andy C, Katy B, Songer, Abel, Alex Mills	Hedex & Eksman, A.M.C, Cassö, Darren Styles, Issey Cross, Jodie Harsh, Redlight
The View	The Teskey Brothers, Willie J Healey, Maya Delilah, Calum Bowie, Peri Rae, Frey, Harry Tabb	Jalen Ngonda, Katie Gregson-MacLeod, Fiona-Lee, The Beau Bennett Collective, Citizen Papes, Maisy Grace, Saff Juno	Royel Otis, Secret Guest, Fred Roberts, Jackie Marua, Haunt the Woods, Clara Bond
The Point	Sammy Virji (cancelled due to crowd surge), LA LA, KIIMI, Kitty Amor, Mafro, P-rallel, Syreeta	Eliza Rose, Sarah Story b2b Absolute., Chloé Robinson, Coco & Breezy, Enzo Is Burning, T.Williams	Ewan McVicar, Elkka, Adelphi Music Factory, Ammara, Jess Iszatt, Love Remain, Mr. Sosa
DB90	Friction, Pola & Bryson, Mungo’s Hi Fi with Marina P & Charlie P, IVY, Emily Makis & Hi-Phi, EV, Grafix b2b Disrupta, Kara	Mozey, Sota, Sika DnB Takeover, Devilman feat Chunky Bizzle, The Maddy V Show feat Dirty Harry, Dutta feat Sox, 3Kingz (Jman, D7, Atlas), Girls Next Door, Mandidextrous, Mixtress, Natty Lou	A.M.C & Phantom, Charlie Tee b2b Lens, Jaguar, Jam Kurr, Dr Dubplate, 24Hr Garage Girls, T-Lex, Dick & Dom (DJ Set)
Keg & Pasty	Mellowmatic, The Funk Federation, C Bone, Die Twice, MCMC Spoken, DJ Shad	Jam & Meme, Boss Cass aka Fluff, Guest Singer, Electric Spank, Hedluv + Passman, Willie Eason Band feat, Joe Hurworth	Dizraeli, Malcolm Joseph & The Unquiet Peace, Shagrat, BBY, Redrø, Flo Crowe & The Dilemmas, Three Minute Warning

== 2023 ==
9–13 August 2023
Day	Stage	Performers
Friday	Main Stage	**Lorde**, Somebody's Child, Ben Howard, The Vaccines, Everything Everything, Gabrielle Aplin, Cian Ducrot, Joesef, Nieve Ella
Friday	The Land of Saints	Krafty Kuts, A Skills, Cypress Hill, SG Lewis, Warmduscher, Frankie Stew & Harvey Gunn, Bob Vylan, Gretel Hanlyn, Wunderhorse, Phoebe Green
Friday	Unleashed	Ben Nicky, Example, Belters Only, Charlotte Haining, p-rallel, Loéca, DJ Proof
Friday	The Point	Ben Hemsley, I. Jordan, salute, Jamz Supernova, The Menendez Brothers, Bronx Cheer, Jack Canning
Friday	DB90	Charlie Tee, Patrick Nazemi, Dimension, Vibe Chemistry, A Little Sound, Sub Zero & Evil B, Gotham, Designate
Saturday	Main Stage	**Liam Gallagher**, Little Simz, Raye, Confidence Man, The Reytons, Dylan, The Lottery Winners
Saturday	The Land of Saints	Mike Skinner (DJ Set), Rudimental (DJ Set), Yard Act, Bear's Den, Nova Twins, Sam Tompkins, Kid Kapichi, Cassyette, Chappaqua Wrestling
Saturday	Unleashed	Nathan Dawe, Bou, piri, B Live 247, Anton Powers, Camden Cox, Emily Nash, Switch Disco
Saturday	The Point	TSHA, Mella Dee, Jaguar, EFFY, KILIMANJARO, Lulah Francs
Saturday	DB90	Phibes, Kanine, Mungos Hifi & Friends, Mollie Collins & Maddy V, AMA, Aldo Vanucci
Sunday	Main Stage	**Florence + The Machine**, Dermot Kennedy, Tion Wayne, Sofi Tukker, Gentlemen's Dub Club, Black Honey, Caity Baser, Beka
Sunday	The Land of Saints	JOY (Anonymous), Four Tet, Shygirl, Squid, Jockstrap, Lava La Rue, Connie Constance, Flowerovlove, Pale Blue Eyes
Sunday	Unleashed	Hot Dub Time Machine, Tom Zanetti, Bru-C, Riton, D.O.D, Charlie Hedges, Essel
Sunday	The Point	Paul Woolford, Danny Howard, Sally C, Sarah Story, Hannah Laing, Charlie Boon
Sunday	DB90	Harriet Jaxxon, Goddard, Kings of the Rollers ft Inja, Gardna, 360 Showcade, Inja, Catalyst, Gear Sands

== 2022 ==
10–14 August 2022
Day	Stage	Performers
Friday	Main Stage	**George Ezra**, Damian 'Jr Gong' Marley, The Lathums, Freya Ridings, Enny, Cassia, Dreya Mac, Everyone You Know
Friday	Land of Saints	Idles, Self Esteem, Mr Jukes, Moonchild Sanelly, Steam Down, Folly Group, Nuha Ruby Ra, The Velvet Hands, DJ Jonezy (closing DJ)
Friday	Unleashed	Joel Corry, Bru-C, Arielle Free, Majestic, Shift K3Y, Shane Codd, Beyond Chicago, Battle of the Bangers
Friday	The Point	Mall Grab, HAAi, Ewan Mcvicar, Absolute., Charlie Boon, Tibasko, Bronx Cheer & Anna M
Friday	The View	Ocean Alley, Matilda Mann, Molly Payton, Michael Aldag, Max Rad, Ellie Dixon, Seb Heart and the Curly Heads, Charlie Scoble, Romy Helen
Friday	DB90	Flava D, SPY (Flava D presents 3 Flavas: Flava D b2b SPY w Lowqui), Bklava (Flava D presents 3 Flavas: Flava D b2b Bklava), Phibes, Mampi Swift (Mampi Swift b2b Crissy Criss), Kings of the Beats (Freestylers, Plump DJs, Krafty Kuts), Aldo Vanucci
Saturday	Main Stage	**Disclosure**, Bastille, Declan McKenna, Mimi Webb, Sam Ryder, Kamal., BEKA, 90's Rave Fitness Class
Saturday	Land of Saints	Bombay Bicycle Club, Pale Waves, Mae Muller, Rae Morris, Thomas Headon, Crawlers, SIPHO., Dancehall, Aldo Vanucci (closing DJ)
Saturday	Unleashed	Kurupt FM, Nathan Dawe, Jaguar Skills, Girls Don't Sync, Rude Kid, Dixon Brothers, Battle of the Bangers
Saturday	The Point	Patrick Topping, Shermanology, Sarah Story, Meg Ward, Ryan Platts, Sara Fry, Wallis Ryan
Saturday	The View	Dreadzone, Oscar Lang, Jack Botts, Tamzene, Swim School, Ben Camden, Bastie Ingram, Jack Ferry
Saturday	DB90	Holy Goof, Jungle Cakes takeover (with Deekline, Ed Solo, Benny Page, and Navigator), General Levy, Culture Shock, Conducta, Gentlemens Club, Charlie Tee, Bennitrate
Sunday	Main Stage	**Kings of Leon**, Tom Grennan, The Wombats, Joy Crookes, Palace, JC Stewart, Rachel Chinouriri, Stone
Sunday	Land of Saints	De La Soul, Arrested Development, Remi Wolf, Sad Night Dynamite, Pip Millett, EFÉ, The Bug Club, The Rills, Boca 45 (closing DJ)
Sunday	Unleashed	Jax Jones, LP Giobbi, 220 Kid, Billen Ted, Jack Saunders, Jodie Harsh, Will Bailey, Battle of the Bangers
Sunday	The Point	Franky Wah, Prospa, Ben Hemsley, Chaos In The CBD, I. Jordan, Lulah Francs, Ryan Winters, Jack Be Nimble
Sunday	The View	Lime Cordiale, Sons of the East, Eli Smart, Azure Ryder, Worryworry, The Alive, Oscar Stembridge, Sam Richardson and The Renegades, Ezmay Grace
Sunday	DB90	Shy FX with Stamina MC, Born On Road takeover (Aries, Kelvin 373, Gray, Selecta J-Man, Crossy), AC13, 24hr Garage Girls (feat. Shosh), Sam Supplier, DJ Klimax

== 2021 ==
11–15 August 2021
Day	Stage	Performers
Friday	Main Stage	**Foals**, Sam Fender, Lianne La Havas, Jade Bird, Kojey Radical, Holly Humberstone, Olivia Dean, Josef, Emma McGrath, Sam Richardson and The Renegades
Friday	Land of Saints	Kano, Mahalia, Georgia, Griff, Alfie Templeman, Master Peace, Mathilda Homer, Kam-Bu, The Native, The Dixon Brothers (closing DJs)
Friday	Unleashed	Sonny Fodera, MistaJam, Franky Wah, Karen Harding, Majestic
Friday	The Point	Honey Dijon, Eats Everything, Kettama, Ejeca, Madvilla
Friday	DB90	Andy C, Metrik, Barely Legal, Koven, Shapes, 2Shy
Saturday	Main Stage	**Gorillaz**, Loyle Carner, Becky Hill, Ocean Wisdom, Maisie Peters, Inhaler, The Snuts, Baby Queen, Lycra 80s Aerobic Dance Party
Saturday	Land of Saints	The Kooks, Django Django, Ashnikko, Gabrielle Aplin, Hollie Cook, Do Nothing, Larry Pink the Human, Chubby and the Gang, Facepaint, Jack Saunders (closing DJ)
Saturday	Unleashed	Young T & Bugsey, Lady Leshurr, The Four Owls, Tiffany Calver, DJ Target, Rude Kid, Bklava, DJ Jonezy
Saturday	The Point	Basement Jaxx, Gerd Janson, Cinthie, Dance System, TSHA, Charlie Boon, Ekkah
Saturday	DB90	Crucast takeover, Bru-C, Darkzy, Kanine, Lazcru, MC AD, Skepsis, Window Kid, Zero
Sunday	Main Stage	**Jorja Smith**, Dizzee Rascal, Blossoms, Easy Life, Maverick Sabre, The Big Moon, Gengahr, Gentleman's Dub Club, Noisy, Dr Funk
Sunday	Land of Saints	Jamie XX, Slowthai, Beabadoobee, Arlo Parks, The Futureheads, Goat Girl, The Mysterines, Katy J Pearson, Flowers of Palo, Heléna Star (closing DJ)
Sunday	Unleashed	Sigala (Live), James Hype, Conducta, Jaguar Skills, Kelli-Leigh, Charlie Hedges, Just Kiddin
Sunday	The Point	Maribou State, Folamour, Jayda G, Adelphi Music Factory, Jaguar, Heléna Star, Lulah Francs
Sunday	DB90	Netsky, Sherelle, Crissy Criss, Charlie Tee, Phibes, Mike Skinner

== 2020 (cancelled) ==
The 2020 Festival was cancelled due to the COVID-19 pandemic.

5–9 August 2020
Day	Performers
**Friday**	**Skepta**, The Kooks, Mura Masa, DJ EZ, Blossoms, Little Simz, Ocean Wisdom, Honey Dijon, Jeremy Loops, Easy Life, Hannah Wants, Kojey Radical, Jade Bird, Sports Team, Folamour, Prospa, Haai, Flava D, Miraa May, Conducta, Dan Shake, Jessica Winter, Caravana Sun, Tender Central, Aaron Smith, Bou, Ed Solo, Deekline, Tora, Dixon Brothers, Mollie Collins, Ekkah, Wuh Oh, Sean Koch, The Allergies, The Tribe, Andy Quick Band, Cakeboy, Penny Eyes, The Eyelids, Palooka 5, Lucy Gallant, Sadie Horler
**Saturday**	**Kings Of Leon**, Dizzee Rascal, Sam Fender, CamelPhat, Lianne La Havas, Basement Jaxx (DJ set), Example, Maribou State, Palace, Elderbrook, Gabrielle Aplin, Allah-Las, The Four Owls, Gerd Janson, Krystal Klear, Gengahr, Hollow Coves, Bad Sounds, DJ Boring, DJ Hype, Kawala, CC:Disco!, Feet, TC, AC13, Illyus & Barrientos, Stray Beast, Harriet Jaxxon, Riley Pearce, Alex The Astronaut, The Big Sets, The Barefoot Bandit, Sam Richardson, Zeb, Tribo Groove, Felon, Visionbi, Lulah Francs, O'Deus, Andrew Cushin, Bailey Tomkinson
**Sunday**	**The 1975**, Loyle Carner, Damian Marley, Andy C, Mabel, Frank Carter & The Rattlesnakes, Hot Chip, Pale Waves, Hybrid Minds, Outline, CruCast, Ghetts, The Big Moon, Palms Trax, Artwork, Beabadoobee, Gentlemen's Dub Club, Trevor Hall, Jayda G, Chaos in the CBD, Eva Lazarus, Sherelle, Lily Moore, Phibes, John, Bambara, Casey Lowry, Tay Oskee, Land of the Giants, Joe & The Shitboys, Finlay, DJ Proof, Hearing And Beige, Holly Humberstone

== 2019 (cancelled) ==
Festival was cancelled due to adverse weather conditions.

7–11 August 2019
Date	Stage	Performers
Friday	Main Stage	**Wu-Tang Clan**, Giggs, Razorlight, Mabel, SG Lewis, The Magic Gang, Ocean Alley, Josh Barry, Apre
Friday	Unleashed	DJ EZ, Ocean Wisdom, Problem Central, James Hype, Crissy Criss, Artful Dodger, DJ Jonezy
Friday	Land Of Saints	The Wombats, The Hunna, Bear's Den, Gabrielle Aplin, Sunset Sons, Bodega, Easy Life, Queen Zee, So Fresh So Clean
Friday	The Point	Claude VonStroke, Richy Ahmed, Derrick Carter, Mella Dee, Todd Edwards, Jim Rider, Jamie Miller, Ryan Platts
Saturday	Main Stage	**Florence and the Machine**, Dizzee Rascal, Franz Ferdinand, Sam Fender, Lady Leshurr, Sinead Harnett, Sea Girls, Carvanna Sun, The Alive
Saturday	Unleashed	Jax Jones, Martin Solveig, My Nu Leng, Elderbrook, Darkzy, Karen Harding, Shapes, Barely Legal, Cakeboy
Saturday	Land Of Saints	Rudimental, Sleaford Mods, Ibibio Sound Machine, Mahalia, Self Esteem, Feet, Laurel, Hockeysmith, Dixon Brothers
Saturday	The Point	Danny Howard, Paul Woolford, Rebūke, Artwork, Ross From Friends, Mele, Weiss, Prospa, Eli & Fur, Heidi
Sunday	Main Stage	**Foals**, Jorja Smith, Slaves, Michael Franti & Spearhead, Lewis Capaldi, House Gospel Choir, Grace Carter, Skeggs, Rayland Baxter, The Stalks
Sunday	Unleashed	Wilkinson, Sub Focus, Bugzy Malone, Flava D, Dimension, Nathan Dawe, DJ Proof
Sunday	Land Of Saints	Plan B, Idles, Dermot Kennedy, Soak, Boy Azooga, Georgia, Cassia, Para Fiction, Boca 45
Sunday	The Point	Mall Grab, Dennis Ferrer, Two Tribes, Mason Maynard, Eli Brown, The Menendez Brothers, Crawford, Bradley Zero, Jaguar

== 2018 ==
8–12 August 2018
Date	Stage	Performers
Friday	Main Stage	**Catfish and the Bottlemen**, Kano, Miles Kane, Fun Lovin' Criminals, Raye, Has Baker, Samm Henshaw, Willie & The Bandits
Friday	Unleashed	MK, Stefflon Don, DJ Zinc, MJ Cole, Fred V & Grafix, Audio Bullys, Will Clarke, Light Layers
Friday	Land Of Saints	Everything Everything, Ash, The Amazons, Rae Morris, Kitty, Daisy & Lewis, Phil Taggart, Hockey Dad
Friday	The Point	Claptone, Idris Elba, Gene Farris, Doorly,, Bronx Cheer, Ryan Platts
Saturday	Main Stage	**The Chemical Brothers**, Years & Years, Editors, MNEK, The Sherlocks, Isaac Gracie, Kele Okereke, Wildwood Kin, Newquay Male Voice Choir
Saturday	Unleashed	Annie Mac, Shy FX, Riton & Kah-Lo, Kideko, Kelli-Leigh, Monki, Shapes, Cakeboy
Saturday	Land Of Saints	Lily Allen, Feeder, Grandmaster Flash, Nadine Shah, Gengahr, Flyte, Balcony
Saturday	The Point	Skream, Denis Sulta, Steve Lawler, Butch, Krystal Klear, Two Tribes, Haai
Sunday	Main Stage	**George Ezra**, Rag N Bone Man, Fat Freddy's Drop, Declan Mckenna, Becky Hill, Tom Walker, King Tuff, Mahalia, Stereo Honey
Sunday	Unleashed	Craig David, Disciples, Nadia Rose, Holy Goof, Bobii Lewis, DJ Proof, Danny Howard
Sunday	Land Of Saints	Friendly Fires, The Horrors, Songhoy Blues, Sam Fender, Confidence Man
Sunday	The Point	Bicep, Booka Shade, Tiga, Dusky, Monki, Trance Wax, Shadow Child

== 2017 ==
9–13 August 2017
Date	Stages	Performers
Friday	Main Stage	**Two Door Cinema Club**, The Flaming Lips, Frank Turner, Loyle Carner, Laura Mvula, Ten Tonnes, Ibibio Sound Machine
Friday	Unleashed	Andy C, Giggs, TQD, High Contrast, Phil Taggart, Light Layers, Joe Fox
Friday	Land of Saints	DJ Shadow, Kurupt FM, Lower Than Atlantis, Pulled Apart By Horses, Lucy Rose, Haunt The Woods
Friday	The Point	Roger Sanchez, Patrick Topping, Purple Disco Machine, Carly Foxx, Punctual, Luke Hassan
Saturday	Main Stage	**Jamiroquai**, The Vaccines, Lethal Bizzle, Tom Grennan, Newton Faulkner, Raye, Will Joseph Cook
Saturday	Unleashed	Gorgon City, Hannah Wants, Jax Jones, Icarus, Conducta, Mad Villains, Dextric
Saturday	Land of Saints	Jake Bugg, Slaves, Kate Nash, Jagwar Ma, Wild Beasts, Daisy Clark, Palace
Saturday	The Point	Pete Tong, Idris Elba, Camelphat, Sonny Fodera, Yotto, Boo Seeka
Sunday	Main Stage	**Alt-J**, Stormzy, Ziggy Marley, JP Cooper, Becky Hill, Kiko Bun, Sam Fender, Dutch Uncles
Sunday	Unleashed	Netsky, Armand Van Helden, Dub Pistols, Shapes, Tonn Piper, Star One, Saint Phnx
Sunday	Land of Saints	Wretch 32, Fickle Friends, The Amazons, A Blaze of Feather, Formation, Frances, Off Bloom
Sunday	The Point	Solardo, Hot Since 82, T.Williams, Panda, Patrick Nazemi, Digital Farm Animals

== 2016 ==
August 10–14, 2016
Date	Stages	Performers
Friday	Main Stage	**Chase & Status**, Catfish & The Bottlemen, Lianne La Havas, Blossoms, Jack Savoretti, Nahko & Medicine for the People, Spring King, Tiggs Da Author, Auction for the Promise Club
Friday	Unleashed	Wilkinson, Krept & Konan, Danny Howard, Playground Zero, FK Panda, Light Layers
Friday	Land of Saints	Wolf Alice, Maxïmo Park, Dinosaur Pile-Up, The Correspondents, Formation, Kagoule, Holy Esque, Youth Club, Keir, Smokin Durrys, Franklin
Friday	The Point	Eats Everything, Bicep, Jonas Rathsman, Bodhi, Toucan, Carly Foxx, Drift, Rokaman, Asheley Thomas, Danny Armstrong, King Louie
Saturday	Main Stage	**Deadmau5**, Kaiser Chiefs, Foxes, Protoje, Jamie Lawson, Michael Kiwanuka, Eliza & the Bear, Louis Berry, Sloes, The Steelers
Saturday	Unleashed	Craig David (cancelled), Kano, SG Lewis, Eton Messy, Icarus, Apres, Nimmo, Young Franco
Saturday	Land of Saints	Example & DJ Wire, Roots Manuva, Gabrielle Aplin, The Duke Spirit, The Mouse Outfit, Antimatador, Hyde & Beast, Hidden Charms, Kloe, Joseph J Jones, James Shead
Saturday	The Point	Dusky, Heidi, Eli & Fur, Camelphat, Bronx Cheer, Tian Karl, Jac the Disco, Ry Spenceley, Frank Mcweeney, Deluxx Djs
Sunday	Main Stage	**James Bay**, Primal Scream, Soul II Soul, White Denim, Coasts, Rationale, The Magic Numbers, VANT, Hein Cooper
Sunday	Unleashed	Sigma, Mike Skinner & Murkage present Tonga, My Nu Leng & Dead MC, MNEK, Charlie Tee, DJ Proof
Sunday	Land of Saints	Mystery Jets, Soak, Rat Boy, Raleigh Ritchie, The Big Moon, White, Recreations, Tigerclub, Dedicated Nothing, Alibis, Bulletpoof Bomb
Sunday	The Point	Jackmaster, Detroit Swindle, Maribou Sate, Doorly, Artwork, Ben Remember, Jim Rider, SI Gordan, Ant Durkin, Adam Wyatt

== 2015 ==
5–9 August 2015
Day	Stage	Performers
Friday	Main Stage	**Faithless**, Catfish and the Bottlemen, Nick Mulvey, Lower Than Atlantis, Circa Waves, Reef, Sundara Karma, The Academic, Haunt the Woods
Friday	Unleashed	Roni Size Reprazent, Fred V Grafix & Crisis MC, Blonde Live, 99 Souls, Is Tropical, Tora
Friday	Mavericks	Fat White Family, The Wytches, Toy, Vangoffey, Vant, Spring King, Twin Wild, Lost Dawn, The Velvet Hands
Friday	The Point	The Magician, Eton Messy, Fono, Kokiri, Jax Jones, Just Kiddin, Kayper, Waverley
Saturday	Main Stage	**Rudimental**, De La Soul, Seasick Steve, Rea Morris, MNEX, Rhodes, Rag'n'Bone Man, Plastic Mermaids, Vaults, Marcus Mccoan
Saturday	Unleashed	Duke Dumont, Djez, Apres, Everything Everything, Astronomyy, High Tyde
Saturday	Mavericks	Drenge, Bo Ningen, The Strypes, God Dawn, Nai Harvest, Kid Wave, Yak, Declan McKenna, Moriaty, Tinnedfruit
Saturday	The Point	T Williams, Low Steppa, Icarus, Doorly, Marquis Hawkes, SG Lewis, Fk Panda
Sunday	Main Stage	**Bastille**, Clean Bandit, Arrested Development, Sunset Sons, Lucy Rose, Prides, Kim Churchill, Fickle Friends, Movie, Osca
Sunday	Unleashed	Groove Armada, Skream, 8 Traits, Maribou State, Holt Blackheath
Sunday	Mavericks	The Darkness, Pulled Apart by Horses, The Computers, Black Peaks, Axis of, John Coffey, Jettblack, Ringo Franco, Wolf Note, Buffalo Frame
Sunday	The Point	Waze & Odyssey, Monki, Wiess, Grades, Luxury, Illyus & Barrientos

== 2014 ==
6–10 August 2014
Day	Stage	Performers
Friday	Main Stage	**Chase & Status**, MistaJam, The Enemy, Dan Croll, Elli Ingram, Tom Vek, Saint Raymond, Ezra Vine, Isaiah Dreads
Friday	Unleashed	Shy FX, Roni Size, Meridian Dan, Stanton Warriors, Major Look, The Feud, Ryeland, Sinprint, Jello
Friday	Mavericks	Palma Violets, Yuck, Darlia, Big Deal, The Bohicas, Lyger, The Black Tambourines, Pastel Colours, The Bulletproof Bomb, Flashes
Friday	The Point	Friend Within, Jonas Rathsman B2B Isaac Tichauer, Eton Messy, Blonde, Bodhi
Saturday	Main Stage	**Snoop Dogg**, Zane Lowe, The Cribs, The Cuban Brothers, Bipolar Sunshine, Lewis Watson, The Coronas, The Ramona Flowers, Current Swell
Saturday	Unleashed	Duke Dumont, Wilkinson, Shift K3y, KNYTRO, Panda, Funeral Suits, Ry Spencely, Bat & Ball, Tiernan Locke & Sean Moyle
Saturday	Mavericks	Dead Kennedys, Cerebral Ballzy, Decade, Coves, Southern, Life, Cut, Tides, Tom Gall
Saturday	The Point	Ben Pearce, Kidnap Kid, Toyboy & Robin, My Nu Leng, Billion, Justin Harris, Bronx Cheer, Xy Constant, Adam Wyatt, Premise
Sunday (cancelled)	Main Stage	**Bastille**, Peace, George Ezra, Catfish & The Bottlemen, Boy & Bear, Raleigh Ritchie, We Were Evergreen, Amber Run, Sunset Sons, New Desert Blues
Sunday (cancelled)	Unleashed	2manydjs (DJ Set), Oneman, Goldierocks, MØ, DJ Jonezy, Breton, DJ Proof, Antimatador, King Louie, Le Soso
Sunday (cancelled)	Mavericks	Reel Big Fish, Blitz Kids, Jaws, Verses, Magnus Puto, Save Your Breath, Ghouls, Wolf Note, Pirate Copy, Patrons
Sunday (cancelled)	The Point	DJ EZ, Monki, TCTS, Roska, The Golden Boy, One Bit, Rektchordz, Robin Paris, Ashley Thomas

== 2013 ==
7–11 August 2013
Date	Stage	Performers
Friday	Main Stage	**The Vaccines**, Everything Everything, Frightened Rabbit, The Other Tribe, Nina Nesbitt, Drenge, Ryan Keen, The Struts, Velcro Hooks, Hazards
Friday	Unleashed	Benga, Redlight, MistaJam, Friction, Ayar Marar, Majestic, Second City, Jello, Darko
Friday	Mavericks	We Are the Ocean, Dinosaur Pile Up, Tall Ships, The Physics House Band, Royal Blood, PJP Band, Dark Horses, I Am Giant, Gnarwolves, Bloody Knees, Honey, Week Night Thieves
Friday	The Point	Dusky, Bondax, Monki, Eton Messy, Discoguns, Adam Wyatt & Jim Rider, Alex Locke & Sean Moyle
Saturday	Main Stage	**Basement Jaxx**, Miles Kane, Delphic, Little Comets, Clean Bandit, Man Like Me, Ben Caplan, The Dexters, The Dedicated Nothing, Land of the Giants
Saturday	Unleashed Stage	Simian Mobile Disco, Xxxy, Fenech-Soler, Jakwob, Tom Staar, Jac The Disco, Ry Spencely, Jose Hugo, Ashley Thomas
Saturday	Mavericks	Mallory Knox, Hawk Eyes, Brother & Bones, Crowns, Steve Smyth, The Sea, Dolomite Minor, Young Aviators, Rat Attack, Bad Channels
Saturday	The Point	T.Williams, Gorgon City, Maribou State, Panda, Robin Paris, Ant Durkin, Luke Gledhill
Sunday	Main Stage	**Ben Howard**, The Joy Formidable, Tom Odell, Swim Deep, Hudson Taylor, Ahab, Story Books, Amber States, These Reigning Days
Sunday	Unleashed	Grandmaster Flash, B.Traits, Skints, Snatch The Wax, Breaks Collective, Kind Louie, Will Bailey
Sunday	Mavericks	Temples, Little Barrie, The Virginmarys, The Computers, Wet Nuns, A Plastic Rose, Dancers, Great Cynics, Moriarty
Sunday	The Point	MJ Cole, Copy Paste Soul, DEVolution, Justin Harris, Tim Nice, Piers Kirwan, Delux DJs

== 2012 ==
8–12 August 2012
Date	Stage	Performers
Wednesday	Beach Sessions	Reel Big Fish, The Skints, Magnus Puto, The Heartbreaks, Gary and the Minefield
Thursday	Beach Sessions	Xavier Rudd, Aruba Red, Sam Beeton, Adam Isaac, October
Friday	Main Stage	**Ed Sheeran**, The Ting Tings, Donavon Frankenreiter, The Big Pink, The Jezabels, Sissy & The Blisters, Jake Bugg, Towns, Gabrielle Aplin, Gecko
Friday	Unleashed	DJ Fresh, Sway, Clement Marfo & The Frontline, Major Look, Snatch The Wax, Tim Nice, Deluxx DJs & Sax, Dante Gabriel, Robin Parris, Steve Lid
Friday	Vans Stage	Pulled Apart by Horses, While She Sleeps, Feed the Rhino, Hawk Eyes, Marmozets, Smoking Hearts, Great Cynics, Verses, Hildamay, As We Sink
Friday	Marley Point	Zinc, Utah Saints, Pyramid, D.O.D., CJ Beatz, Loud Minority, DJ Natty
Friday	Energy Sessions	The Japanese Popstars, Punks Jump Up, Random Impulse, Swiss Lips, Plastic Thumbs, The Mongolian Disco Show, Crooked Cats
Friday	Desperados Dome	Breakage, Maxsta, Mikill Pane, Duke
Friday	The View	Ruarri Joseph, Ryan Keen, Thomas J Speight, Peter Bruntnell, Karima Francis, Comedy Hour, Emily & The Woods, Jack Wallen, Kezia, Kaj, Solo Collective DJs
Saturday	Main Stage	**Dizzee Rascal**, Maxïmo Park, Maverick Sabre, Delilah, Juan Zelada, Josh Kumra, Jenny O., Cut Ribbons, Lilygreen & Maguire, Lost Dawn
Saturday	Unleashed	Zane Lowe, NZ Shapeshifter, Krafty Kuts, Doorly, The Beat Medics & Benny MC, Jac the Disco, Dancefloor Outlaws, Luke Gledhill, Ashley Thomas
Saturday	Vans Stage	Set Your Goals, Futures, Turbowolf, Sharks, Eye Emma Jedi, Crowns, Exit Ten, Mixtapes, Eager Teeth, Hold the Sun, Kernuyck, Empire of Fools
Saturday	Marley Point	MistaJam, Rudimental, B Traits, Freerange DJs, Hong Kong Ping Pong, Loud Minority, Shaka Parris & Phuture Funk, DJ Natty
Saturday	Energy Sessions	Young Guns, Don Broco, Bwani Junction, Proxies, Plastic Thumbs, Crooked Cats, The Solo Collective
Saturday	Desperados Dome	Shy FX, Murkage, Deekline, Duke
Saturday	The View	Dodgy, Aruba Red, Charlotte O'Connor, Michael Cassidy, Comedy Hour, Matthew & Me, Hudson Taylor, Gareth Lee, Tom Gall, Saskia Maxwell, Solo Collective DJs
Sunday	Beach Sessions	The Black Seeds, Yes Sir Boss, DJ Ollie Stratton, Josh Kumra, Gareth Lee

== 2011 ==
10–14 August 2011
Stage	Performers
**Main Stage**	**Fatboy Slim**, **Klaxons**, Bombay Bicycle Club, Sub Focus (Live), Eliza Doolittle, Zane Lowe, Stereo MC's, Liam Bailey, Easy Star All-Stars, Benjamin Francis Leftwich, Willy Mason, Cloud Control, Ben Howard, Yaaks, Flashguns, Maverick Sabre, Pippa Marias, Dub the Earth, Brother and Bones, Lori Campbell, Crowns
**Relentless Stage**	DJ Yoda, The Qemists, Lethal Bizzle, Gentleman's Dub Club, Art Brut, The Skints, Wolf Gang, Urban Knights, More Diamonds, Spokes, Back Beat Soundsystem, The Violet May, I Am Harlequin
**Vans Stage**	Skindred, The King Blues, Twin Atlantic, Gay for Johnny Depp, Kids in Glass Houses (DJ set), Hyper, Francesqa, Lower Than Atlantis, Crazy Arm, Me Vs Hero, Straight Lines, Bangers, Max Raptor

== 2010 ==
4–8 August 2010
Stage	Performers
**Main Stage**	**Newton Faulkner** (Friday), **Seasick Steve** (Friday), **Leftfield** (Saturday), Chase & Status (Live, Saturday), Xavier Rudd, Example, Plan B, French Horn Rebellion, Tinie Tempah, Ou Est Le Swimming Pool, Alan Pownall, Fenech-Soler, Lisa Mitchell, Goldhawks, Matthew P, Peggy Sue, Fisherman's Friends, Thomas Ford, People's String Foundation, Hedluv + Passman, Three Minute Warning
**Relentless Stage**	Gallows, Chase & Status, Rolo Tomassi, New Young Pony Club, Dwarves, Crystal Fighters, The Ghost of a Thousand, Crazy P, Devil Sold His Soul, Punks Jump Up, The Chapman Family, Urban Knights, Japanese Voyeurs, The Cheek, Turbowolf, Sound of Guns, Sometime Never, Morning Parade, The James Cleaver Quintet, Teenagersintokyo, The Wild
**Vans Stage**	We Are The Ocean, Madina Lake, Trash Talk, Young Guns, The Computers, Failsafe, Chickenhawk, Little Fish, Sharks, Cars On Fire, Lower Than Atlantis, White Belt Yellow Tag, Goodtime Boys, Jettblack, Cerebral Ballzy, Everything Burns, March of the Raptors, The Sum Of, Crocus, We Fell From The Sky, Rash Decision, Ape
**View Stage**	Ruarri Joseph, Rosie Vanier, Rich Thomas, Josie & The Lovecats, Special Guests, Yellow Wire, Andrew Bate, Jake Butler, Joe Janiak, Ellie Lawson, The Jude, ACS, The Spree, Sam Naylor, Marco Spiezia
**Beach Sessions**	The Futureheads, Natty, Reverend Soundsystem, Zero 7, Baddies, Backbeat Soundsystem, Tall Ships, Ben Howard, People's String Foundation, The Quails, Lori Campbell, DJ Ollie Stratton

== 2009 ==
5–9 August 2009
Date	Stage	Performers
Wednesday	Beach Sessions	The Blackout, We Are the Ocean, Everything Burns, Downtown Riots
Thursday	Beach Sessions	Pete Murray, Ben Howard, Rob Sawye, Max Tuohy, Boy Who Trapped The Sun
Friday	Main Stage	**The Streets**, Calvin Harris, Roots Manuva, The King Blues, Ash Grunwald, Master Shortie, Gold Teeth, Cosmo Jarvis, Rob Sawyer
Friday	Boardmasters Relentless Stage	Kissy Sell Out, Freeland, Pete & The Pirates, Fionn Regan, Sky Larkin, Wallis Bird, The Sea, Party Horse, The Answering Machine, The Boy Who Trapped The Sun
Friday	Vans Stage	Brakes, Xcerts, Dinosaur Pile-Up, Failsafe, This City, Jettblack, Telegraphs, Crazy Arm, Gentlemen's Pistols, Suit Noir, San Pablo
Friday	Jaegermeister Stage	My Elvis Blackout, patrickjamespearson, Thomas Ford, Astro Firs, Hedluv, Tall Ships, Gregor and the Martians, The Tixielicks, Bhodazaffa, Suitenoir, The Panicstruck, Tony Haven
Saturday	Main Stage	**Cypress Hill**, Super Furry Animals, Dan le Sac, Dreadzone, Will and the People, Ben Howard, Tristan Prettyman, Max Tuohy, Back Beat Soundsystem
Saturday	Boardmasters Relentless Stage	Pendulum (DJ Set), Filthy Dukes, Tommy Sparks, James Yuill, Fanfarlo, Chew Lips, Haunts, Rosie & The Goldbug, Pete Lawrie, Auction For The Promise Club
Saturday	Vans Stage	Ghost of a Thousand, Pulled Apart by Horses, The Plight, Outcry Collective, Hexes, The Computers, Sharks, Turbowolf, White Man Kamikaze, Don Broco, Everything Burns
Saturday	Jaegermeister Stage	Back Beat Soundsystem, San Pablo, Wille and the Bandits, Louis Elliot, Bobbie G, Jim Jones, Zenneck Wave, The Restaurant, Josie and The Lovecats, Steph Newton, Little Red Dragon, Jake Butler
Sunday	Beach Sessions	Sneaky Sound System, Jelly Jazz, DJ Ollie Stratton

== 2008 ==
4–10 August 2008
Date	Stage	Performers
**Friday**	**Main Stage**	**Groove Armada**, The Zutons, Audio Bullys, Morcheeba, Natty, The Black Seeds, Yoav, Beau Young, Jersey Budd
**Friday**	**Second Stage**	Mystery Jets, The Holloways, Haunts, Sam Isaac, Jeremy Warmsley, Jersey Budd, Bookhouse Boys, The Locarnos, Rosie & The Goldbug
**Saturday**	**Main Stage**	**The Pigeon Detectives**, The Futureheads, Reverend and The Makers, Glasvegas, The Young Knives, The Rifles, The Displacements, Red Light Company, Sam Isaac, Astro Firs
**Saturday**	**Second Stage**	Gallows, The Ghost of a Thousand, Johnny Truant, In Case of Fire, Slaves to Gravity, Hexes, Fighting With Wire, Skirtbox, Lioness

== 2007 ==
6–12 August 2007
Day	Stage	Performers
**Friday**	**Main Stage**	**Ash**, **Funeral for a Friend**, The Subways, Fightstar, The Blackout, The New York Fund, Kids in Glass Houses, Undercut, I Say Marvin, Glass Shark
**Saturday**	**Main Stage**	**Paolo Nutini**, Guillemots, Scott Matthews, Newton Faulkner, Ruarri Joseph, Ben Taylor, Angus & Julia Stone, Hayley Sales, Noel Prior

== 2006 ==
31 July – 6 August 2006
Day	Stage	Performer
**Friday**	**Main Stage**	**Feeder**, The Automatic, Captain, Get Cape. Wear Cape. Fly., My Elvis Blackout
**Saturday**	**Main Stage**	**Starsailor**, Graham Coxon, ALO, Breaks Co-op, Nerina Pallot, Hitchcock Rules

== 2005 ==
1 - 7 August 2005
Day	Stage	Performer
**Friday**	**Main Stage**	**James Blunt**, Donavon Frankenreiter, Iain Archer, David Ford, The Martin Harley Band, Kubb.
**Saturday**	**Main Stage**	**Razorlight**, Rooster, Dogs, Faders, Easykill, Envy and Other Sins.
