= Southern (band) =

- Origin: Belfast, Northern Ireland
- Genres: Alternative rock, Blues, Pop
- Years active: 2012-present
- Label: Marathon Artists
- Members: Thom Southern; Lucy Southern
- Website: thisissouthern.com

Southern are a brother and sister duo from Belfast, Northern Ireland, playing a mixture of blues, alternative rock and pop.

Music became Thom's sole focus from the age of 16, when he started busking on the streets of Belfast. Lucy joined him a few years later and the two set out to make their mark on their home town. The band was championed by BBC Radio Ulster's Gerry Anderson who described them as "the most promising singer/songwriters in Ireland today."

Thom & Lucy were signed to London-based record label, Marathon Artists, in 2013 and were immediately picked up as The Guardian's New Band of the Day. Southern have since gone on to support Bastille, Jake Bugg, and Catfish and the Bottlemen.

== Discography ==
=== EP ===
Year	Title	Format	Released	Tracks	Label
2013	Southern	Digital	21 October 2013	"World Don't Shine" "Shout It" "Just Think About It" "Cool Kid"	Marathon Artists

=== Singles ===
Year	Title	Format	Released	Tracks	Label
2014	Where the Wild Are	Digital	28 March 2014	"Where the Wild Are" "Oh Won't You Go" "Four Days"	Marathon Artists
