= The Computers =

British band

- Origin: Exeter, England
- Genres: Alternative rock, hardcore punk
- Years active: Mid 2000s–present
- Labels: Freakscene; Fierce Panda; One Little Independent
- Members: Alex Kershaw; Aidan Sinclair; Fred Ansell; Thomas McMahon; James Mattock
- Past members: Nic Heron; Sonny Crawford; Will Wright

The Computers are a British rock band from Exeter, England. Their sound initially fused hardcore punk and garage rock and progressed to a less heavy sound incorporating blues and soul. As of 2023, The Computers have released one mini-album (You Can't Hide From the Computers, 2008) and three albums, This Is the Computers (2011), Love Triangles Hate Squares (2013) which registered 70 and 75 points, respectively, on the Metacritic rating scale and Birth/Death (2016).

== Band history ==
The band was formed in the mid-2000s by singer/guitarist Alex Kershaw, bassist Nic Heron, guitarist Sonny Crawford and drummer Will Wright. They played their first show in August 2006 at The Cavern in Exeter with American hardcore punk band Paint It Black. Will Wright was replaced in 2009 by drummer Aidan Sinclair. Guitarist and pianist Fred Ansell joined in 2011.

BBC Radio 1 Punk Show host Mike Davies invited them to play a live session on the show after having been a band for less than a year and soon The Computers, then a Black Flag-influenced hardcore punk band, signed to Fierce Panda, who released their debut mini-album You Can't Hide From the Computers in 2008, described by Kerrang! as "stylish UK hardcore" and "punk'n'roll that wants to dance as well as it does break stuff."

In 2010 the quartet recorded their debut album, This Is the Computers (11 songs, 24 minutes), with producer John Reis of Rocket from the Crypt, in just four days at his home in San Diego (straight to tape, without any computers involved). Preceded in February by the single "Group Identity", the album was released on 21 June 2011 by One Little Independent. The band rounded up the year by touring Britain with Gay for Johnny Depp.

Their second album, Love Triangles Hate Squares, which came out on 16 May 2013, took a more eclectic approach than their earlier work and received a mainly positive response. Some critics lauding Alex Kershaw's singing and the way the band's writing had "developed, with many of these witty, catchy songs recalling Elvis Costello and the Hives" (according to AllMusic). Other reviewers claimed the change of direction was derivative and showed its influences too clearly - "Love Triangles Hate Squares is a forceful blast of passion-fired pastiche, but never quite escapes feeling like a cheap holiday in other people's history" according to Classic Rock. DIY said "for all of the frontman’s dynamism, he can’t save a frustratingly slow, out-of-date computer".

In February 2014 Nic Heron and Sonny Crawford announced their departure from the group. Guitarist James Mattock (formerly of Sharks) and bassist Thomas McMahon joined.

In March 2015 the band entered the studio to begin recording their third studio album with producer David McEwan. The Album named Birth/Death released in September 2016.

== Band members ==
=== Current ===
- Alex Kershaw – lead vocals, guitar
- Fred Ansell - guitar & piano
- Sonny Crawford - guitar
- Thomas McMahon – bass guitar
- Aidan Sinclair– drums

=== Previous ===
- Nic Heron - bass
- Will Wright - drums
- James Mattock – guitar

== Discography ==
- Track Four/Is it Just Me? (Freakscene, double A-side single, 2007)
- Teenage Tourettes Camp/Welcome To The Working Week (Elvis Costello cover)/Rebel Girl (Bikini Kill cover) (Freakscene, 7" single, 2008)
- You Can't Hide From the Computers (Fierce Panda, mini-album, 2008)
- This Is the Computers (One Little Independent, 2011)
- The Computers Are Misfits (One Little Independent, Black Friday Ltd edition 10" of The Misfits covers, 2012)
- Love Triangles Hate Squares (One Little Independent, 2013)
- Elvis Vs Elvis (One Little Independent, Record Store Day Ltd Edition 10" compiled of Elvis Costello and Elvis Presley covers, 2013)
- Live & Inconsolable (One Little Independent, Record Store Day Ltd edition Live album, 2014)
- Birth/Death (One Little Independent, 2016)
