= Jessica Winter =

American bioengineer

- Born: 1976 (age 49–50) (Note: In 2011, Winter was reported to be 35); Dallas–Fort Worth metroplex, US

Academic background
- Education: BSc, Chemical Engineering, 1997, Northwestern University; MS, 2001, PhD, Chemical Engineering, 2004, University of Texas at Austin
- Thesis: Development and Optimization of Quantum Dot-Neuron Interfaces (2004)

Jessica O. Winter (born in 1976) is an American bioengineer. She is a professor of chemical, biomolecular, and biomedical engineering and an associate director of the MRSEC Center for Emergent Materials at the Ohio State University. Her research interests include nanoparticles for cancer imaging, diagnostics, and drug delivery; and cell migration in the brain tumor microenvironment. In 2021, she was elected a fellow of the American Association for the Advancement of Science, American Institute for Medical and Biological Engineering, Biomedical Engineering Society, and Royal Society of Chemistry.

== Early life and education ==
Winter was raised in the Dallas–Fort Worth metroplex to academic parents; her father was a physicist while her mother was a chemist. She completed her Bachelor of Science degree in chemical engineering at Northwestern University before entering the work force as a process engineer. During her undergraduate career, she originally wished to study environmental law as a direct result of the Exxon Valdez oil spill but decided to concentrate on chemical engineering. However, she soon grew bored in her job and subsequently enrolled at the University of Texas at Austin for her Master of Science and PhD in chemical engineering.

== Career ==
Upon completing her PhD and postdoctoral fellowship, Winter became an assistant professor of chemical and biomolecular engineering at Ohio State University College of Engineering (OSU) where she began creating nanoparticle materials to detect cancer. In 2012, Winter co-invented fluorescent nanoparticles (called Quantum Dots) that change color when tagging molecules in biomedical tests. The aim of this discovery was to assist in the discovery of diseases and tracking their progress. She was soon encouraged by her OSU colleagues to expand her quantum dots to identify cancer cells in breast tissue samples. Winter then co-established Core Quantum Technologies Inc to commercialize the Quantum Dots that was developed in her laboratory. Following this, she also completed a National Science Foundation (NSF) entrepreneurship program and had reconstructive surgery to combat her breast cancer. As a result of her work using nanoparticle materials in biomedical applications, Winter received the 2012 Inventor of the Year Award from TechColumbus.

The following academic year, Winter continued to develop Core Quantum Technologies Inc and received a four-year NSF grant to increase the production of nanoparticles for commercial use. She also established a research project titled QSTORM with Peter Kner at the University of Georgia to develop new visualization of the inner workings of cells. In November 2014, Winter was elected a Fellow of the American Association for the Advancement of Science for her work developing magnetic quantum dots for cell and molecular separations.

In 2016, Winter was elected a Fellow of the American Institute for Medical and Biological Engineering for "outstanding contributions in biomolecular engineering, particularly the synthesis and development of magnetic quantum dots for cell imaging and separations."

In 2021, Winter received numerous international recognition and awards for her significant contributions to publishing in the chemical sciences. She was first elected a Fellow of the Royal Society of Chemistry after having served on their Journal of Materials Chemistry B for several years. Following this, Winter was elected a Fellow of the Biomedical Engineering Society as someone who "demonstrated exceptional achievements and experience in the field of biomedical engineering." Finally, Winter was appointed a Fellow of the American Institute of Chemical Engineers.
