= Ruarri Joseph =

Scottish singer-songwriter (born 1982)

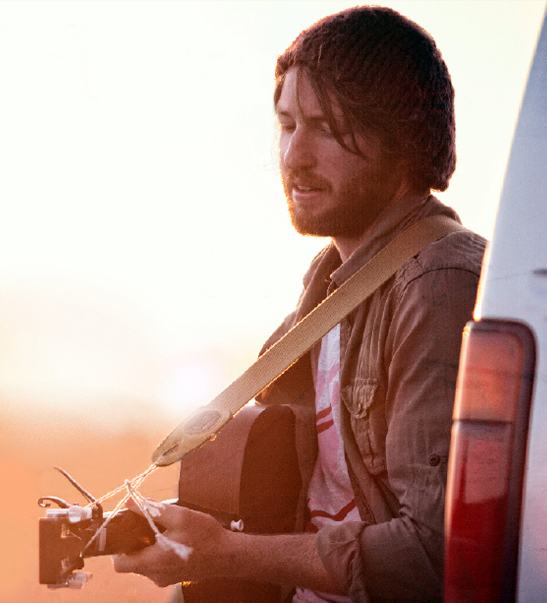

Background information
- Born: 3 January 1982 (age 44); Edinburgh, Scotland
- Genres: Pop/rock, jazz, soul, alternative rock
- Occupation: Singer-songwriter
- Instruments: Vocals, guitar, piano, drums, harmonica
- Years active: 2006–present
- Label: Atlantic Records / Pip Productions / Loose
- Website: myspace.com/ruarrijoseph

Ruarri Joseph (born 3 January 1982) is a Scottish singer-songwriter. He was signed to Atlantic Records and released his debut album, Tales of Grime and Grit, in mid-2007 on that label. Joseph is currently continuing his musical career on his own label, Pip Productions, after deciding to leave Atlantic in early 2008. Ruarri released his second album, Both Sides of The Coin, in February 2009. Joseph began work on his third studio album, Shoulder to the Wheel, later the same year, before releasing it independently in February 2010. The album had a wider physical and download release in November 2010, after Joseph secured a new management deal. His fourth studio album, Brother, was released in July 2012.

Since 2016 Ruarri has focused his attention on his new, band project, William the Conqueror.

== Biography ==
=== Early life and career ===
Joseph was born in Edinburgh, Scotland and after spending some of his childhood in New Zealand moved to England in his teens. After attempting to pursue a career in London, Joseph moved to Newquay, Cornwall after the birth of his first child.

In Cornwall, Joseph continued his career in music and played in a variety of bands such as Eli Bowen and The Rhythm Doctors. As a solo artist, Joseph played with an acoustic guitar and a piano, occasionally accompanied by a band. He finished recording an EP in 2006, "All Substance and No Style", and after a number of live performances in London attracted record label interest. He toured widely in the UK and made several appearances at music festivals including Glastonbury with the Rhythm Doctors in 2004.

=== Atlantic Records and Tales of Grime and Grit (2007–2008) ===
He signed a recording contract with Atlantic Records in 2007. Soon after, Joseph released his debut, digital only EP. Q magazine made its lead track, "Patience", its track of the day in late April. An 8-track version of his debut album Tales of Grime and Grit was released for download on 3 June 2007. The album was released on 9 July, preceded by the lead single, "Tales of Grime and Grit", on 2 July. The second single, a revamp of "Blankets", was released on 24 September. Recording of the album took place at St Merryn Airfield studios in Cornwall, and was produced by the London-based record producer, Paul Reeve.

On 24 June 2007, Joseph played at the Glastonbury Festival on Stage 1 (left field). He has also supported a variety of large acts, including Funeral for a Friend, Paulo Nutini, and more recently David Gray.

=== Post-Atlantic career and Both Sides of The Coin (2008–2009) ===
In mid-February 2008, Joseph announced on his Myspace page that he had opted to leave Atlantic Records, citing differences in opinion for the release of his second studio album, as the main motivation behind the decision. Joseph's criticism of the attitude fostered by major record labels was vehement, stating that he had been perceived as 'an asset, basically like a car tyre, and if they wanted to, they could melt me down and turn me into condoms!'.

Joseph retreated to his garden shed with an assortment of musical instruments to start the recording of his second album, Both Sides of The Coin. Each instrument played in the recordings – including guitars, drums, banjo, accordion, and harmonica – was played by Joseph. Limited space forced Joseph to move them into his shed one instrument at a time. By the end of the summer of 2008, Both Sides of The Coin was completed. It was sold on tour in the winter of 2009, then released widely in February 2009.

=== Pip Productions and Shoulder to the Wheel (2009–2011) ===
Joseph started work on his third studio album in late 2009 and released early demos of potential tracks through his Myspace page. Shoulder to the Wheel was released in February 2010 through his own independent record label, Pip Productions. In October of the same year, Joseph secured a management deal with ACP Recordings, who also handle David Gray, Spiritualized, and Damien Rice. Shoulder to the Wheel was thus allowed a wider download release in November 2010, with 'Orchard for an Apple' being chosen as the lead single. The album peaked at number 8 on the iTunes singer-songwriter chart, and Joseph has been touring extensively post-release. A single mix of 'Orchard for an Apple', featuring new backing vocals and instrumentation, was played on BBC Radio 2 by Alex Lester. Lester announced that the single was due for release on 3 January 2011, coinciding with Joseph's birthday. The song has also had airplay on Steve Wright's daytime Radio 2 show. In December 2010, the song was added to the BBC Radio 2 Playlist, where it remained for three weeks.

Joseph embarked on an extensive tour of Shoulder to the Wheel throughout 2011 and early 2012, playing at various venues across the UK including a gig at the Union Chapel, Islington, supporting Foy Vance.

=== Brother (2012–2016) ===
Joseph started work on his fourth studio album shortly after losing a close friend in 2010; he credits this loss as a great influence on the making of the record in a YouTube video released in June 2012. In January 2012, Joseph announced on his website that the record had been completed and a release date was approaching.

Joseph recorded Brother in The Church Studios, London, being the first of his productions since Tales of Grime and Grit to be recorded with a full band in a studio setting. The one-word title symbolizes "companionship, community, and closeness." The album underwent a limited release in the UK on 9 October 2012, and a wider digital release on iTunes and Spotify on 25 March 2013.

=== William the Conqueror (2017–) ===
Joseph's current project is a three piece band called 'William the Conqueror', alongside friends and previous collaborators Harry Harding (drums) and Naomi Holmes (bass). After signing to Loose, their first album, Proud Disturber of the Peace, was released in August 2017. The band marks a new direction for Joseph, having been described by critics as 'Southern rock with a British twist'. Joseph describes the band as a reaction to his previous work, going in a direction that his teenage self would have appreciated.

The second William the Conqueror album, Bleeding on the Soundtrack, was released in 2019, followed by a UK tour in May 2019, which included a live session for Ricky Ross on his BBC Radio Scotland programme, Another Country.

On 24 November 2019 William The Conqueror played a session for Cerys Matthews on BBC 6 Music.

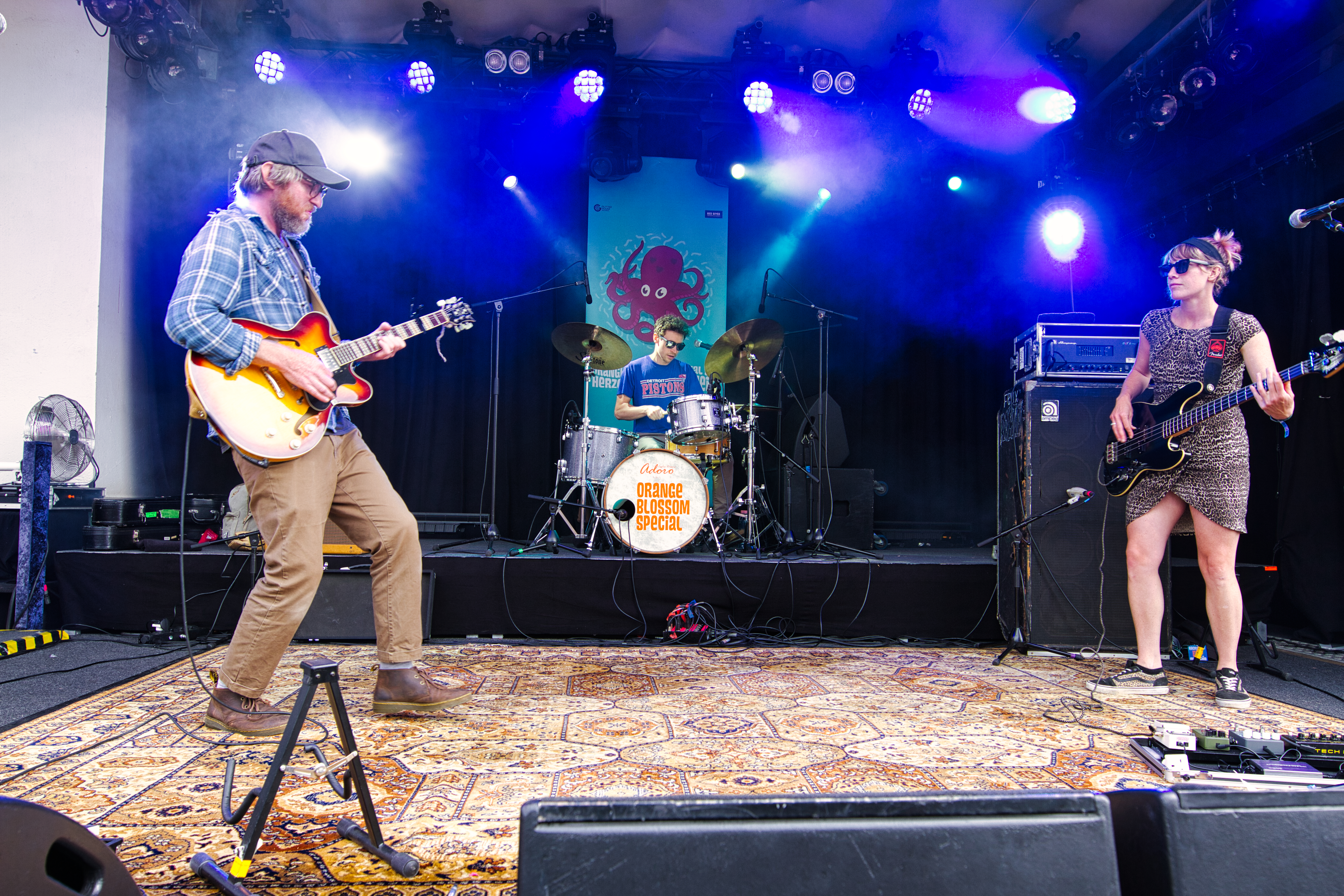
William the Conqueror at Orange Blossom Special Festival, Germany 2024

The third album of the trilogy, Maverick Thinker, was recorded in Los Angeles, at Sound City Studios, in 2020. Recording was impacted by the COVID-19 pandemic but the album was completed, with assistance from producer Joseph Lorge. After signing to Chrysalis Records, the album was released on 5 March 2021, preceded by the singles "Wake Up", "Quiet Life" and "Move On".

== Personal life ==
The year preceding the release of Shoulder to the Wheel was a particularly turbulent time in the musician's personal life. His eldest son underwent emergency brain surgery in mid-2009, and his wife gave birth to their third child at around the same time. Shoulder to the Wheel is dedicated to a family member, with whom Joseph was close, who died during the making of the record.

Joseph married his long-term girlfriend in 2009, and together they have three children. He resides with his family in Cornwall.

== Critical response ==
The response to Ruarri's albums critically has been positive, and they have met with modest commercial success.

Critics generally commended Joseph's first album, Tales of Grime and Grit. Daniel Black of Contactmusic.com, whilst having reservations about the opening songs, stated that "The rest of the album was a collection of some of the greatest songs you'll ever hear under the one album", eventually giving three and a half stars. Matt Clutton of online music magazine Gigwise.com praised Joseph's "uniquely husky, gravely vocals" and "expertly orchestrated acoustics" in his review of the single Blankets. In terms of commercial reception, Amazon.com has posted an average customer review score of four stars out of five stars, from 53 reviews.

Ruarri Joseph's second album, Both Sides of the Coin, has been greeted with a positive reception. Femalefirst.co.uk called the album "an intriguing collection of understated songs" giving it four stars, and a five-star review from Caroline McCarthy of Allgigs.co.uk described the songs as "beautiful" and "wistful".

Shoulder to the Wheel has met with very positive reviews. Comfortcomes.com said Joseph "combines poetry, a serious edge and a soothing acoustic touch to impressive effect throughout", whilst Entertainment Focus described Ruarri as "an interesting and exciting talent" in their review for 'Orchard for an Apple'. Although few US-based music magazines have reviewed the album, one review from Directcurrentmusic.com highlighted that Joseph "rises above the mass of mediocrity" and was "worthy of greater exposure" in the United States. Entertainment-Focus gave the album a glowing five-star review, calling the record "hugely rewarding" and a "gorgeous, understated collection of songs". A slightly more mixed review came from Nima Baniamer of Contactmusic.com. Giving the album three stars, the review stated that the LP "does have major failures", although he praised lead single 'Orchard for an Apple' and described the opening songs as "beautiful" and "haunting". British newspapers The Independent, Metro, and Uncut all gave Shoulder to the Wheel three stars.

== Discography ==
=== Solo albums ===
==== Tales of Grime and Grit ====
All songs written by Ruarri Joseph.

1. "Patience" – 3.26
2. "Won't Work" – 3.26
3. "Blankets" – 3.02
4. "Early Morning Remedy" – 3.08
5. "Baby Finn" – 3.26
6. "Tales of Grime and Grit" – 3.43
7. "Cuddles Are the Best Thing" – 2.54
8. "Infant Eyes" – 2.47
9. "Faces, Movements and Cheats" – 3.04
10. "More Rock and Roll" – 4.01
11. "Relying on Lying" – 4.06
12. "Summercourt Fair 1995" – 1.49

==== Both Sides of The Coin ====
All songs written by Ruarri Joseph.

1. "Suzie Don't Be Sad" – 3:10
2. "One for the Aether" – 4:27
3. "Red Mist" – 3:38
4. "More Than Most" – 4:47
5. "Adam's Wing" – 4:59
6. "Tomorrow Today" – 3:11
7. "Hope For Grey Trousers" – 3:33
8. "A Turn in the Weather" – 3:23
9. "As Long As You Do Too" – 4:06
10. "There We'll Be" – 3:08

==== Shoulder to the Wheel ====
All songs written by Ruarri Joseph except 'Rich Folk's Hoax', a cover of the Sixto Diaz Rodriguez song of the same name.

1. "Nervous Grin" – 2:38
2. "An Orchard for an Apple" – 3:47
3. "Severed Dreams" – 4:04
4. "Rich Folks Hoax" – 3:12
5. "As Always" – 2:57
6. "For The Love of Grace" – 3:39
7. "A Fool of Us All" – 6:04
8. "Keep on Strolling" – 3:58
9. "Cavemen, Yellow, An Ordinary Life" – 1:14
10. "Raining Stone" – 3:36
11. "Glance Across The Street" – 3:49
12. "The Faithless Few" – 2:54

==== Brother ====
1. "Roses & Ashes" – 3:33
2. "Until The Luck Runs Dry" – 4:15
3. "Got My Share" – 4:00
4. "A Good Thing Fallen" – 4:07
5. "Cry on World" – 3:36
6. "The April Spin" – 5:35
7. "No More Sins" – 3:00
8. "Mad World Waiting" – 3:18
9. "Anyway" – 3:55
10. "Brother" – 3:59

=== William the Conqueror albums ===
==== Proud Disturber of the Peace (2017) ====
All songs written by Ruarri Joseph

1. "In My Dreams" – 4:20
2. "Tend to the Thorns" – 3:43
3. "Did You Wrong" – 4:07
4. "Pedestals" – 4:19
5. "Sunny is the Style" – 4:39
6. "The Many Faces of a Good Truth" – 5:06
7. "Proud Disturber of the Peace" – 5:15
8. "Cold Ontario" – 5:00
9. "Mind Keeps Changing" – 3:40
10. "Manawatu" – 5:06

==== Bleeding on the Soundtrack (2019) ====
All songs written by Ruarri Joseph

1. "Path of the Crow" – 3:11
2. "Thank Me Later" – 3:32
3. "Madness On The Line" – 3:21
4. "The Burden" – 5:32
5. "Bleeding On The Soundtrack" – 5:30
6. "Looking For The Cure" – 3:47
7. "The Curse of Friends" – 5:11
8. "Be So Kind" – 3:33
9. "Sensitive Side" – 4:02
10. "Within Your Spell" – 6:17

==== Maverick Thinker (2021) ====
All songs written by Ruarri Joseph

1. "Move On" – 3:11
2. "The Deep End" – 4:03
3. "Alive At Last" – 4:00
4. "Jesus Died A Young Man" – 5:48
5. "Quiet Life" – 3:55
6. "Wake Up" – 3:33
7. "Fiction" – 3:14
8. "Suddenly Scared (24 Storeys High)" – 5:12
9. "Reasons" – 4:35
10. "Maverick Thinker" – 6:38
