= Tora (band) =

Australian electronic band

TORA
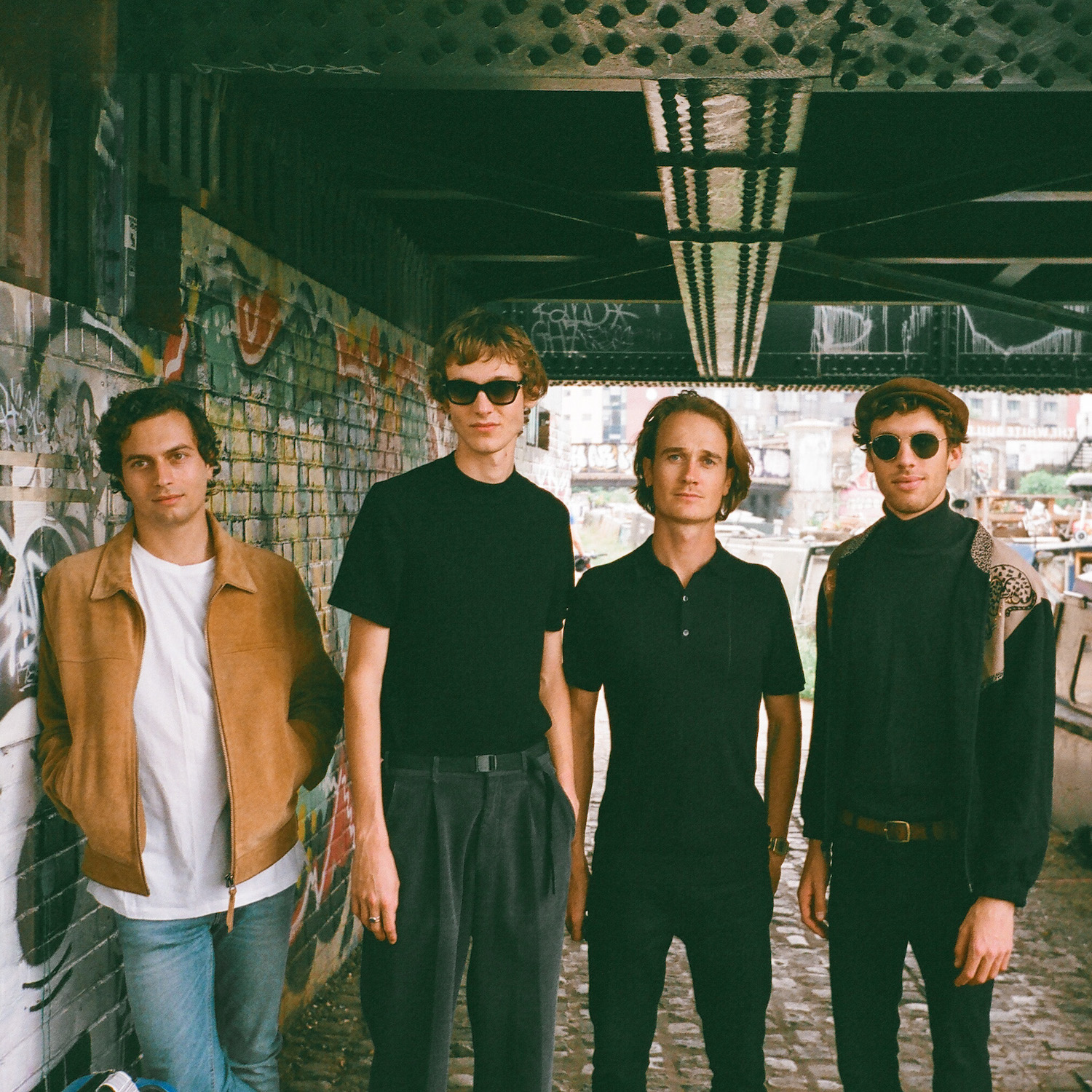

Background information
- Origin: Byron Bay, New South Wales, Australia
- Genres: Chillwave, electronica
- Years active: 2013–present
- Labels: Nuine & Believe Music
- Members: Thorne Davis; Shaun Johnston; Jo Loewenthal; Jai Piccone
- Past members: Tobias Tunis-Plant
- Website: toramusic.com.au

Tora is an Australian electronic band formed in Byron Bay, New South Wales in May 2013. The founding members are Tobias Tunis, Thorne Davis (drums), Shaun Johnston (bass guitar), Jo Loewenthal (lead vocals, guitar, and keys), and Jai Piccone (vocals, guitar, and keys). They have undertaken Australian and international tours. Their tracks have received rotation on the Australian national radio station, after winning Triple J Unearthed competition in 2014.

== History ==
=== 2006–2012: Early Career ===
All Tora band members, (Jai Piccone, Jo Loewenthal, Shaun Johnston, Thorne Davis, and Tobias Tunis-Plant) attended Shearwater Steiner School in Mullumbimby, a town in New South Wales. In 2006, while in high school, they formed an indie-rock band with Loewenthal on lead guitar and vocals, Tunis on drums and Johnston on bass guitar; band was later named Alice Blu. In 2010 the three left Shearwater to attain a diploma in contemporary music served by Northern Rivers Conservatorium Arts Centre (NRCAC). They continued to perform as Alice Blu, including supporting gigs by the Beautiful Girls and by Daryl Braithwaite. According to Loewenthal, "The business classes helped us a lot with negotiating gigs and money and knowing how to promote ourselves."

=== 2012–2013: Formation ===
In mid-2012 Loewenthal began experimenting in Melbourne with electronic music using Reason software while working full-time in call center. He reconnected with Davis. Tunis-Plant was traveling Europe and developing new song ideas while Johnston was undertaking a Bachelor of Audio Engineering at John Martin Cass Academy. At the end of 2012, Davis and Loewenthal moved back to Byron Bay; "After moving back up from Melbourne, we decided to make a more electronic-fused band and incorporate electronic production." From October Loewenthal and Tunis-Plant resumed their songwriting partnership for electronic-infused music. In January 2013, Loewenthal began teaching music to Piccone, after which they formed a songwriting partnership. When Johnston returned from Melbourne in May 2013, Tora was officially formed. The group's name is from the Greek word τώρα tṓra meaning "now". They released the first single, "Unobtainable", co-written by Loewenthal and Tunis-Plant.

Later Loewenthal said, "We just started making music in our bedroom, which was like a big granny flat sort of thing. The first Tora track we made in four days – 'Unobtainable' – it just came together, and we were like 'wow'. Electronic music is so much more fun to play and make... So we made that track then stewed on it, then made heaps of tracks – then after a while we just decided to put them up and see what people thought. We got a much better reaction than we'd ever had for Alice Blu – so we were a bit excited about that." According to Byron Bay Festival's correspondent, they played a "blend of ambient harmonies, layered rhythms and pulsing soundscapes." Aside from electronica they perform in the new-age genre, chillwave.

=== 2013: Debut extended play ===
In October 2013, Tora released their debut self-titled seven-track extended play, which had "swirling, electronica influenced pop, drawing from the likes of SOHN & James Blake". Crack in the Road reviewer, Josh, commented that the group were "rather bizarre in a way, in that they’re seemingly the opposite of the 'make a shit load of noise' model, keeping it somber yet beautiful, opting to rely on minimal, sparse beats and haunting vocals." The band received high rotation on national radio as the single, "Calming Her", was entered in the Triple J Unearthed competition. It received 100,000+ plays in its first three months of release. The band was invited to play their first large scale performance, at Falls Festival Byron Bay, on NYE.

=== 2014: Eat the Sun ===
In March 2014, Tora released their single, "These Eyes", which received 120,000+ plays within the first three weeks with support from blogs. It was written by Loewenthal and Tunis-Plant. Amrap's AirIt's reviewer described the track, "The vocal soothes our soul, and reminds us we still have one. We're not left waiting for a drop or a climax because all we want is for the chill wave to continue indefinitely. Vocal cutting, lush synths and xylophone attach to your psyche, leaving you nothing but residual warmth." The release was followed up with a tour across some of the state capital cities (Brisbane, Sydney and Melbourne) in April 2014. Over the next few months Tunis began working with female vocalist Merryn Jeann from fellow band, Potato Potato. According to Loewenthal, "most of the song was created in our bedrooms." Soon after her vocals were developed into a track titled 'Overcome ft. Merryn Jeann' released early July 2014 and marked as their most successful release, receiving blog action from channels like 'TheSoundYouNeed'. A month earlier Tora won the regional leg of the Unearthed competition; consequently they opened the main stage at Splendour in the Grass, Byron Bay.

In September 2014 Tora accepted a support slot with Miami Horror on their "Wild Motion (Set it Free)" tour again playing in Australia's major cities. On return Tora released their second EP, Eat the Sun, in November 2014 with tracks "from candle-lit R&B jams, to soothing, electronically laced ballads." They embarked on a national tour with their Sydney and Port Macquarie performances completely sold-out. The year finished up with a run of shows at 'The Falls Arts & Music Festival 2014' in Byron Bay with Tora on the line-up along with bands such as Alt-J, Jamie XX, BadBadNotGood & Glass Animals. Their tracks, "Overcome" (featuring Potato Potato), "Admire", "Jaigantic" and "High Enough", have received high rotation on national radio station, Triple J's playlist. Jaigantic' was remixed by heralded LA-based producer Galimatias, which has now clocked up 16M streams (2019).

=== 2015: International Tour ===
With over 2 million streams on SoundCloud alone, Tora had an international tour in April 2015. In June they were at the Canadian Music Week after having performed in Los Angeles, New York, Montreal, Quebec and Sherbrooke. Starting with the 'High Enough' tour in Canada the band continued through to Europe for the summer playing internationally acclaimed festivals, such as The Great Escape Festival in Brighton, Fusion Festival in Germany, and Glastonbury Music Festival in UK alongside acts such as Pharrell Williams, The Who, Glass Animals, Jon Hopkins, & Jack Garratt. 25 August the quintet release an original work titled "LATP" Early October the band returned to Canada for another run of shows before finishing up in America with CMJ Festival in New York City and a North American tour with fellow Australian band SAFIA. The European leg of their tour, from July to September, was filmed by Carlos Walters for his Vimeo documentary, Tora European Tour Diary 2015. As summarized by Loewenthal on the band's return home "193 days, almost 80 shows and over 50,000 km of driving."

=== 2017–2018: Take A Rest ===
In 2017 Tora released their debut album, 'Take A Rest', which was added to high rotation on Triple J and received acclaim from Elton John (Beats 1), Annie Mac (BBC Radio 1), BBC 6 Music, rotation on Germany's Flux FM and Radio Eins, as well as being a favourite amongst global tastemakers such as Line of Best Fit, Indie Shuffle and Pigeons & Planes.

After playing at Glastonbury, Splendour in the Grass, The Great Escape, Canadian Music Week, and also supporting artists like RÜFÜS DO SOL, SAFIA and Miami Horror, the release of 'Take A Rest' saw Tora return to touring the world, supporting the likes of Oh Wonder (UK), as well as showcasing the album live through the UK, Europe and Australia and performing their own sold-out shows in London, Amsterdam, Paris, Melbourne and in Byron Bay.

Much of this time was also spent working on new material, spending focused time in London, LA, Berlin and Amsterdam writing and collaborating. In 2019, they had around 1 million monthly listeners on Spotify alone.

In 2018 Tora released 'Wouldn't Be The Same' featuring Brisbane artist Keelan Mak. The track has clocked over 2 million streams.

=== 2019: Can't Buy The Mood ===
On 1 March, Tora released 'Deviate', which was Co-written and co-produced in London at the RAK Studios with Roy Kerr (London Grammar, Lana Del Rey). This laid the foundations for the announcement of second album 'Can't Buy The Mood' (9 August 2019 via LUSTRE) a body of work deeply inspired by themes of human connection. Whilst Can't Buy The Mood was primarily made in the region of Byron Bay, the band also ventured into studio spaces in LA, London and Amsterdam to work on the album. Completely written and produced by the band themselves, they also did all the design and artwork, completing an artistic vision which was key to the experience of the album. With field recordings once again a key feature, the album includes 13 tracks.

== Musical style ==
Tora's music has been compared to the likes of Sohn, Toro Y Moi and James Blake., with characteristics of the Chillwave genre.

== Labels, Agencies & Management ==
- Managers – Martijn De Jong & Joris Van Welson (Attack & Release)
- Labels – Nuine & Believe Music (World Ex GSA) // Eighty Eight Days for GSA
- Agents – The Agency Group (America), Z|ART (Europe)

== Discography ==
=== Albums ===
- Take a Rest (June 2017)
- Can't Buy the Mood (August 2019)
- A Force Majeure (September 2021)

=== Extended plays ===
- Tora EP (October 2013)
- Eat the Sun EP (October 2014)

=== Singles ===
- Unobtainable (May 2013)
- Practice (May 2013)
- Captivate (June 2013)
- Offering (August 2013)
- These Eyes (March 2014)
- Overcome feat. Merryn Jeann (June 2014)
- Eat the Sun (July 2014)
- High Enough (June 2015)
- LATP (August 2015)
- Poly Amor (May 2016)
- Twice (July 2016)
- Wouldn't Be The Same feat Keelan Mak (October 2018)
- Deviate (February 2019)
- Morphine (April 2019)
- Can't Buy The Mood (April 2019)
