= Phibes =

Phibes is a surname. Notable people with the surname include:

- A. V. Phibes (fl. from 2000), American illustrator
- Jackson Phibes (born 1965), professional name of Tom Bagley, Canadian artist and musician

== Fictional characters ==
- Dr. Phibes (Anton Phibes), character portrayed by Vincent Price in the horror films The Abominable Dr. Phibes and Dr. Phibes Rises Again
