= Hedluv + Passman =

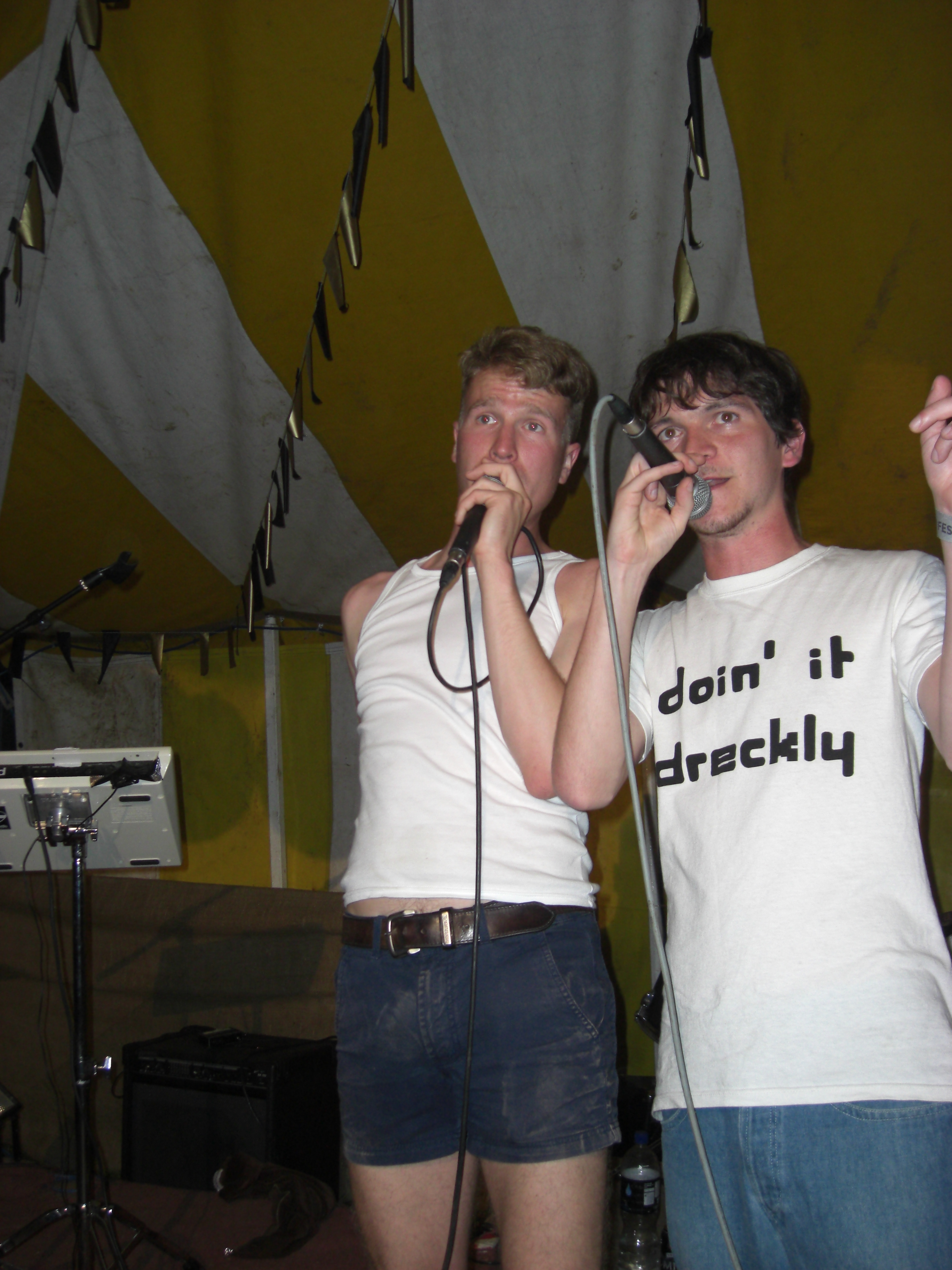
- Hedluv + Passman performing at Farmfest, Somerset, 2010

Background information
- Origin: Redruth, Cornwall, England
- Genres: Rap
- Instrument: Casiotone
- Years active: 2007–present
- Website: https://www.hedluvandpassman.com/

Hedluv + Passman are a rap duo from Redruth, Cornwall. They perform "Casio rap", a genre where lyrics are laid over simple homemade beats. Their song "the future!" was used in the opening credits to Rhys Darby's comedy series Short Poppies.

Launching in 2007, the duo were quick to make the BBC Radio 1 playlist and, after touring in Brazil in 2008, played Glastonbury Festival in 2009. Also in 2009, Hedluv the Musical was awarded "Film of the Festival" at the Cornwall Film Festival.

In 2012, they performed at The Gilded Balloon for the Edinburgh Festival Fringe. Advertised as comedy, their show received mixed reviews, with The Guardian saying that 'their combination of demented commitment and catatonic defeatism [made] for an oddly mesmerising hour'.

== Early life ==
Hedluv and Passman met while attending Trewirgie Junior School, and became friends. They were in the same tutor group in Redruth Community School, and they both studied Music at Truro College. Their first live music performance was on 16 June 2001 in The Bassett Arms, Redruth, as the creative core of the indie band, Dumb Self.

== Career ==
=== Cosmic Sounds ===
Hedluv's solo album, Cosmic Sounds was released in October 2007, to excellent review from The West Briton. The cover was a photograph of a Casio MT-65, which is used in their live shows.

=== We Came Here Not for Gold ===
We Came Here Not for Gold was released in 2011, the title being a line from the film, Nude on the Moon.

== Discography ==
=== Studio albums ===
- Cosmic Sounds (2007)
- We Came Here Not for Gold (2011)

=== Singles ===
- "Christmas Rappin'" (2008)
- "M.I.C" (2017)
