= Girls Don't Sync =

British girl group

- Origin: Liverpool, England
- Genres: Electronic; house; UK garage
- Years active: 2021–present
- Members: Gaia Ahuja; Matty Chiabi; Hannah Lynch; Sophia Violet

Girls Don't Sync are a British girl group and collective of DJs, consisting of members Gaia Ahuja, Matty Chiabi, Hannah Lynch and Sophia Violet. They formed in 2021 in Liverpool as a group of promoters who hosted events, before forming their own musical group. Their releases since forming have been rooted in electronic, house and UK garage genres, with the group being outspoken supporters of British nightlife culture.

== History ==
Members Gaia Ahuja, Matty Chiabi, Hannah Lynch and Sophia Violet initially formed as a group of promoters. Ahuja brought the group together: Ahuja and Chiabi knew each other from attending school together in South London. Ahuja then moved to Liverpool for university, where she met Violet, who was DJing at the club Ahuja worked at. Ahuja met Lynch after being gifted a DJ course for her birthday and writing to Lynch as she was the only female DJ in Liverpool that she was aware of, wanting to shadow her. Ahuja and Lynch then began hosting DJ workshops at the Unity Theatre youth club. They hosted events, curating line-ups and booking female DJs to debut at said events; they stated that their core mission was to showcase emerging talent, as well as support grassroot venues.

They eventually formed a musical group together, initially playing DJ sets as Girls on Deck, before altering their name to Girls Don't Sync. Explaining their group name, they have spoken about the stigma around women DJs, particularly around them being unable to use the technical equipment, as well as claims of them reaching for the "sync" button, which automatically beat matches and puts the music in time. They wanted their name to be a simultaneous rejection and reclamation of that. In 2022, they won DJ Mag's Breakthrough DJ accolade. Many of their first sets were in small, underground venues in Liverpool, where they formed, with their first gig at District in the Baltic Triangle. They have gone on to play at larger venues including Glastonbury Festival, playing on the Liverpool docks for the Eurovision Song Contest 2023 crowd, Boomtown, Warehouse Project, and doing an Australian tour.

In November 2024, Girls Don't Sync released their debut single, "Come Thru". They used vocals attained from Splice and released the track under their own label, Fourmation Records. They hoped the song would appeal to various generations, citing nostalgic music as an inspiration, but also hoping they had added a modern twist, which they affirmed they would do in future releases. Their first 2025 release was "Our House", which they made about inclusivity within clubbing culture, stating: "our new single is an attempt to recognise those differences and at the same time reassure people that they belong at our sets regardless of gender, race or sexuality." Alongside the single, they also wrote an essay for Wonderland magazine about the importance of UK nightlife culture, urging the government to protect the future of it. They used original vocals on the track, with Lynch handling vocals. Shortly after its release, Girls Don't Sync played at BBC Radio 1's Big Weekend, on their Dance Stage.

In August 2025, they released their third single, "Come Get Dis". Chiabi's vocals were used for the track. They initially made "Come Get Dis" for clubs, they began using it within festival sets and were surprised by the positive reception. September 2025 saw their fourth single, "Workin' With", as well as the announcement of their debut extended play (EP) for later that month. The EP, Code Orange, was released on 26 September of that year. They returned in January 2026 with the single "Keep Dancing".

== Artistry ==
Chiabi's inspirations come from UK funky, hard drum tracks and Afrobeats. Ahuja, who has London roots and South Asian heritage, is inspired by grime and Arabic instrumentals. Violet is inspired by hard house and European rave classics, while Lynch was described as a "musical excavator" and an enjoyer of deep-cut edits and remixes. The group do not practice or rehease for any of their sets together and have stated that they are often surprised by what their fellow members play on the night.

== Discography ==
=== Extended plays ===
List of extended plays, with selected details
Title	Details
Code Orange	Released: 26 September 2025; Label: Independent; Format: Digital download, streaming

=== Singles ===
List of singles as lead artist, showing year released
Title	Year	Album
"Come Thru"	2024	Non-album single
"Our House"	2025	Code Orange
"Come Get Dis"	2025	Code Orange
"Workin' With"	2025	Code Orange
"Keep Dancing"	2026	TBA

== Awards and nominations ==
Year	Ceremony	Category	Nominee(s)/work(s)	Result	Ref.
2022	DJ Mag Best of British Awards	Breakthrough DJ	Girls Don't Sync	Won	
2025	DJ Awards	Garage / Bassline	Girls Don't Sync	Won	
