= The Sea (band) =

English rock band

The Sea were an English rock band from Cornwall, England, between 2007 and 2014. They released three studio albums, played over 1000 concerts in over 15 plus countries over several tours.

The band consisted of brothers Peter Chisholm (lead vocals, guitar, keyboard) and Alex Chisholm (Drums, percussion and backing vocals). They were signed to Lusty Records in the UK, the Hamburg-based Popup Records in mainland Europe and Black Nutria in Italy and distributed by Rough Trade, Cargo and Pinnacle.

== History ==
=== "Love Love Love" and Get It Back ===
In April 2007, the duo won the XFM unsigned bands competition to play at the Big Night Out concert supporting The Enemy at London's Brixton Academy to 5000. By October that year they had completed their first extensive tour of the UK and were invited to play the CMJ Music Marathon in New York.

The Sea's debut single "Love Love Love" was released on Lusty Records and sold out within two months of release in October 2007, receiving critical acclaim in the UK music press from NME, Kerrang!, The Fly "Love Love Love" achieved Number 8 in the Kerrang Charts and was Single of the Week in The Guardian, beating Paul McCartney to the top spot. "Love Love Love" also received large amounts of support on UK radio, with Ferne Cotton of BBC Radio One declaring her support for the band. In 2008 they released two more singles "Don't You Want Me" and "By Myself" the former reaching Number 10 in the Kerrang Charts whilst "By Myself" showed a more softer side of their sound, it still achieved several 'single of the month' articles, including Nuts Magazine. They also recorded and released a collaboration with the London band The Krak (which featured ex-Babyshambles drummer Gemma Clarke) a cover of the Prodigy track "Outta Space" and performed this several times with The Krak throughout the summer of 2008 in central London venues as well as twice together on the Leftfield stage at the Glastonbury Festival that year.

In April 2009 their debut album Get It Back was released in UK on Lusty Records and on Pop Up Records in Europe. To rave reviews throughout the UK and European music press in Kerrang!, The Fly, Base Ad, NME, Rocksound and The Guardian, as well as many of the European magazines. The rest of the year was spent touring worldwide which included supporting Muse at their Teignmouth homecoming gigs to 12,000 people in September, slots at Glastonbury Festival and CMJ Festival in New York City in October. Touring continued into 2010 with their first headline tour in Europe including dates in Germany, France, Switzerland, Belgium and the Netherlands, then culminating into a final performance at South by Southwest (SXSW) in Austin, Texas, US.

=== Zandra Rhodes ===
The band also dipped their toes into the world of high fashion. Around this time Zandra Rhodes designed and created stage outfits for the band to be worn at their performance at the CMJ Music Festival in New York City. However, after wearing the outfits the band felt that the image was not right for them and the relationship was ended.

=== Rooftops, "New York", surfing accident ===
Recording for their second album initially began in New York City at the Cutting Room Studios in late 2009 but it was not until the summer of 2010 that they recorded in the Sawmills Studio in Cornwall with producers John Cornfield and Julian Diggle. Rooftops moved away from the raw, two piece feel of Get It Back and saw the band experiment with piano songs as well as larger, grander productions using horns and strings on some tracks. Halfway through the recording session they did a short tour of Germany taking in several festival performances and testing the Rooftops material to audiences for the first time.

In August that year, Alex Chisholm suffered a terrible surfing accident in Cornwall, nearly drowning and breaking his neck, after being airlifted to hospital it was said by doctors he would be lucky to walk again and very doubtful that he would ever play drums again. Seemingly their career was over; tours were cancelled and the band went on hiatus. However, his recovery was better than expected, and after only a period of rehabilitation in eight months, he was playing the drums again.

During this time Rooftops was officially released to wide critical acclaim especially in Germany. The first single, "New York", received radio support throughout all of Germany's major radio stations and was the band's first (and biggest) hit. "New York" later featured on the album Matuschkes Lieblinge Vol. 2 a compilation album released by Sony of the biggest hits in Germany of 2012 which reached number 5 in the German Albums Chart. "Don't You Want Me" was featured on Channel 4 soap Hollyoaks and "Silly Love Song" was featured on an advert on the 5* Channel.

In a way of helping rehab their friend, James Morrison offered them a support slot on his UK tour and, in 2012 The Sea were playing some of their biggest shows ever in the UK. However the material was deemed a little too soft for their existing UK fans and the band started to hint in interview that Rooftops would be a one off experiment, and they would return to the raw sound they initially became popular for.

=== Car crash ===
At the end of 2012, the band then suffered another huge set back when their tour van was in a horrific car crash in Belgium. With the vehicle completely destroyed, both band members walked out alive. However this led to another big tour being cancelled.

=== High On ===
In January 2013, the band performed at the Eurosonic Festival in The Netherlands, road testing tracks from their next record, this performance was broadcast on the German music television show, Rockplast. On their return, The Sea began pre-production rehearsals with producer Julian Diggle in a rehearsal studio in Brighton, England. In the spring they went into John Cornfield's home studio in Cornwall, UK and cut another album. At the request of their label in Germany, PopUp, this was condensed into a five track EP that was released on limited edition 12" vinyl only. A tour of Europe, UK and festival shows in Canada and US was undertook to support its release. However the band were seemingly unhappy at the limited edition status release and were vocal at the time of wanting a full album and single campaign. A tour of China was cancelled just days before it was due to start.

=== 1808 and "Get Up, Stand Up, Die" ===
In January 2014, the band released their first official single in over a year. "Get Up, Stand Up, Die" was their first UK single for two years and it was one of their most successful UK single. With radio support "Get Up, Stand Up, Die" was released on download worldwide and on limited edition, hand painted vinyl – which sold out. The band embarked on their biggest UK tour ever with over 50 dates as well as many festivals. They also played tour support to the Canadian band Your Favourite Enemies, on their debut UK tour in March. During this tour they released 1808, the original collection of songs recorded at the High On... sessions. It was supported by their next single, "I Hear The Drums".

In July 2014 the band announced they had ceased to be. Their final gig was a sold out show at The Monarch in London on 20 July 2014.

== Discography ==
Studio albums

- Get It Back (2009)
- Rooftops (2011)
- 1808 (2014)

Singles

- "Love Love Love" (2007)
- "Don't You Want Me" (2008)
- "By Myself" (2008)
- "New York" (2011)
- "Silly Love Song" (2012) – Germany Only
- "Shake Shake" (2012) – UK Only
- "Emily's Waltz" (2012) – Germany Only
- "Get Up, Stand Up, Die" (2014)
- "I Hear The Drums" (2014)

EPs

- High On... (2013) – limited edition 12" Vinyl
