= The New York Fund =

Country rock band from London

Background information
- Origin: London, England
- Genres: Country rock Indie rock
- Years active: 2004 – 2010
- Members: Joseph McAdam; Adrian Woodward; Reuben Humphries; James Anthony Austen Lewis

The New York Fund are a four-piece country rock band, originating from London, England. They cite their major influences as including Ryan Adams, Neil Young, The Band, Bob Dylan and Teenage Fanclub.

== History ==
=== Cherryfalls ===
The New York Fund started out life as an indie outfit named Cherryfalls, formed in 2003. Lead singer, Joseph McAdam, originally from Glasgow, Scotland met guitarist Adrian Woodward at an acoustic gig in London and the two hit it off with their joint love of Teenage Fanclub proving to be a creative link between the two. Shortly after this initial meeting the two hooked up for a rehearsal, found drummer, Reuben, and finally bassist, James Anthony Austen Lewis and Cherryfalls was born. The band toured round small venues throughout London and attracted the attention of the major label Island Records at the Cross Keys in Chiswick where the managing director of Island Records spotted them, which led to them being signed.

Whilst signed with Island Records they released their debut single, "All My Sins" in May 2004, and wrote and recorded their debut album Winter/Winter, which was released on-line. However, although "All My Sins" never made it on to the album, two further singles from that album; "Standing Watching" (UK No. 64) and "In Your Arms Again" were released in 2004. In 2005, a support slot alongside Feeder helped them to raise people's awareness of them, and coincided with the release of their fourth single, "My Drug". However, despite their obviously increasing popularity, Island decided to only put out 500 copies of their LP for the whole of London, and were subsequently dropped by Island. Drummer, Reuben left the band and Leo Sutherland was drafted in as the drummer in the newly named The New York Fund.

=== The New York Fund ===
The new band led to a new sound, with the band taking advantage of the creative freedom that being unsigned had given them, Joe stating that

'It’s also really exciting to see yourself and your band and your music growing and changing. I guess that’s one of the big positives that came out of losing our ‘Big Major Deal’. It really gave us a lot of freedom to experiment, which I’m sure that we wouldn’t have had if we’d stayed with Island.'

Their sound was influenced by country artists such as Ryan Adams, and yet maintained the rockier edge that they had developed as Cherryfalls. Following another run of shows around the London venues, The New York Fund released their first six track EP entitled The Guns EP in February 2007. This EP was well received and led to them being championed by several radio DJs, most notably Dermot O'Leary on his show on BBC Radio 2, which has led to their track, "Nobody Home", being included on his compilation album, The Saturday Sessions: The Dermot O'Leary Show.

The EP also caught the attention of other, well established bands, which led to a supporting slot with The Hold Steady and one date supporting Ash on their 2007 UK tour. They have finished a string of music festival appearances in 2007, with shows including the Glastonbury Festival, T in the Park, Loch Lomond and two appearances at V Festival (Chelmsford and Stafford).

In 2008, Sutherland left the band and original Cherryfalls drummer, Reuben Humphries, was welcomed back. After months of recording, producing and mixing the band released their debut album in 2010.

== Discography ==
=== Singles ===
Cherryfalls

- 2004 - "All My Sins"
- 2004 - "Standing Watching" - UK No. 64
- 2004 - "In Your Arms Again"
- 2005 - "My Drug" - UK No. 71

The New York Fund

- 2007 - "The Guns EP" - February

=== Albums ===
Cherryfalls

- 2004 - Winter/Winter

The New York Fund

- 2010 - Wine, Women & Song
