= Twin Wild =

British alternative rock band

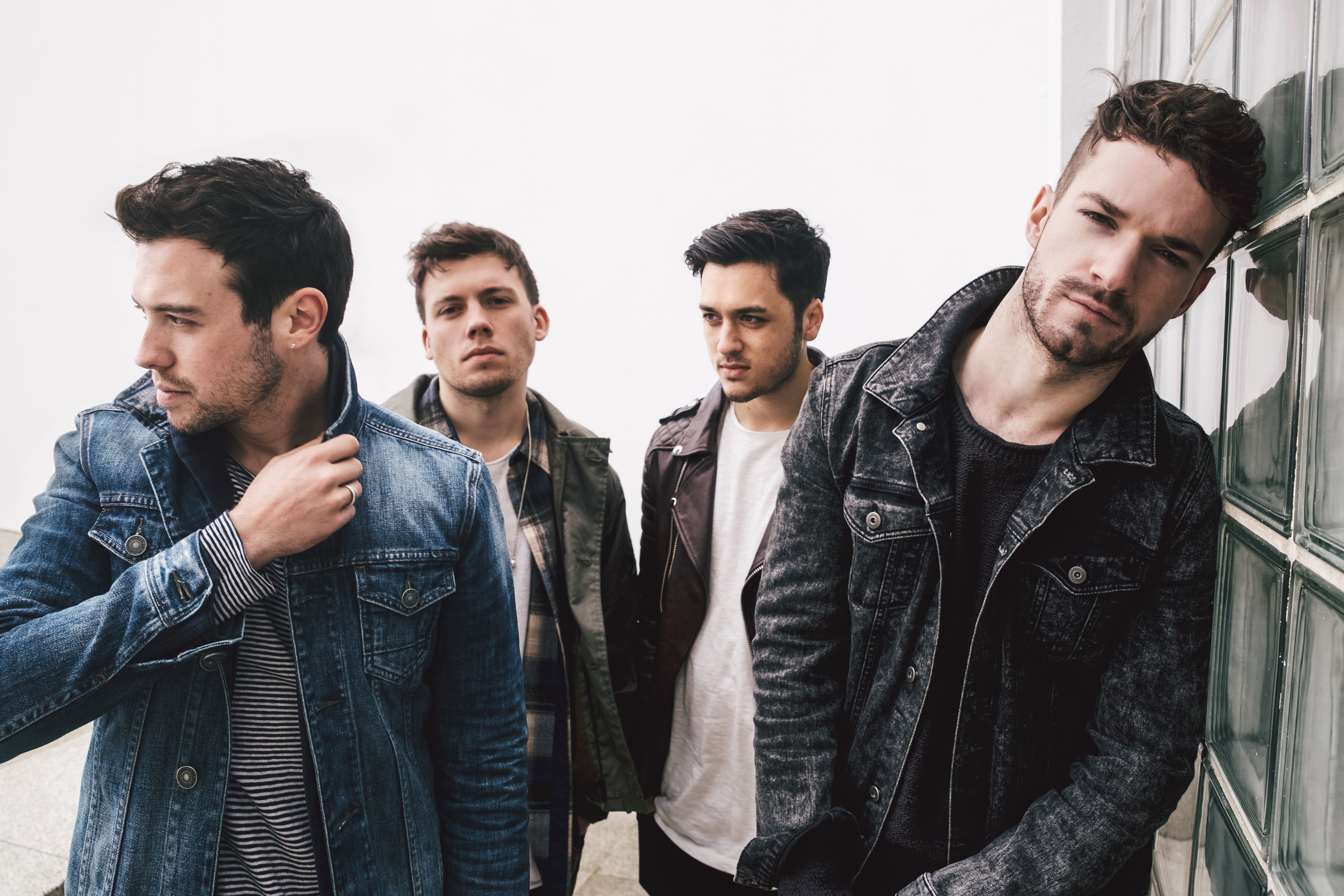
From left to right: Edward Thomas, David Cuzner, Imran Mair, Richard Hutchison.

Twin Wild is a British four-piece alternative rock band. Formed in 2012, the band is made up of Richard Hutchison (vocals, guitars), Imran Mair (drums), David Cuzner (guitars) and Edward Thomas (bass). In 2014, the band self-released their track "Fears", which garnered over half a million plays within the week on SoundCloud and charted in Spotify’s Top 20 viral chart. Their style of music has been compared to the likes of Foals, The Neighbourhood, and Bastille. The band have been hailed by Edith Bowman as "The love child of Bastille and Biffy Clyro".

== Background ==
Originally based in Fleet, the band formed in 2012. Their self-released single "Fears" quickly turned industry heads as the song grew to reaching half a million plays on SoundCloud within a matter of weeks. Following this, the band placed on Spotify's Top 20 viral chart, and were picked as Zane Lowe's 'Hottest Record'.

The British four-piece have gone on to support the likes of Nothing But Thieves, Pvris and You Me at Six, moving from opening the Big Top Stage at Isle of Wight Festival to headlining the Hard Rock stage the following year.

With the release of their new single "My Heart", the band have enjoyed similar success, reaching No.1 in Spotify's Swedish viral charts and selling out their first London headline show at the Boston Arms.

== Discography ==
=== Extended plays ===
- Control EP
- My Heart EP

=== Singles ===
- "Suburban Dreams"
- "Control"
- "My Heart"
- "Another Stranger"
- "Fears"

== Band members ==
- Richard Hutchison – Vocals, guitars
- Imran Mair – Drums
- David Cuzner – Guitars
- Edward Thomas – Bass
