= Jersey Budd =

- Origin: Leicester, England
- Genres: Alternative rock Indie rock
- Occupation: Singer-songwriter
- Years active: 2008–present

Jersey Budd is an English singer-songwriter from Leicester, England. He has also recently become a star striker for St Patrick's AFC who play in the Leicester District League

== Music career ==
He released his first album Wonderlands in 2009, which included the singles "She Came Back", featuring backing vocals by Kasabian's Tom Meighan, and "Bright Soul". In 2010 he released Louis Armstrong's "When You're Smiling" with Leicester City F.C., in celebration of the club's success in reaching the Championship Play-offs and he sang the song on the pitch before the first leg against Cardiff City at the Walkers Stadium. He re-released the single in 2011 and appeared on ESPN's Talk of the Terrace in early September of that year.

Budd has supported many artists on tour such as Kasabian, The Rifles, The Enemy, James Morrison, Amy Macdonald and Turin Brakes. In 2012 and 2013 he released three five-track EPs on Smoky Carrot Records.

== Discography ==
=== Studio albums ===
- Wonderlands (2009)
- The Gathering Dust (2017)

=== EPs ===
- Heartbreaker EP (2012)
- Down to the Wire (2013)
- Time Stands Still (2013)
