= Bongo's Bingo =

UK based event company

- Type: Private
- Industry: Entertainment
- Founded: April 2015
- Area served: Worldwide
- Number of employees: 120
- Website: www.bongosbingo.co.uk

Bongo's Bingo is a bingo-themed event created by Joshua Burke and Jonny Lacey in April 2015. Originally operating from Liverpool's Camp and Furnace venue, it is now based in its own custom built venue, Content, as well as regularly hosting nights around the UK and abroad.

== History ==
In April 2015, Joshua Burke and Jonny Lacey (Jonny Bongo), who had been hosting pub quizzes and club nights in Liverpool joined together to create Bongo's Bingo, an evening of bingo with the atmosphere of a "student rave". It quickly gained popularity and by 2019 was hosting sell-out nights in Ibiza, Dubai, Australia and Amsterdam. In 2019 they also moved from their original home of Camp and Furnace to their own venue, Content, on Stanhope Street in Liverpool's Baltic Triangle.

Bongo's Bingo held three events in New York in February 2024.

In 2025 Bongo's Bingo marked their tenth anniversary with two shows at the Exhibition Centre, Liverpool. In that decade they had had over 5 million customers and given away over 5,000 Henry hoovers as prizes. As of 2025, there are 40 regular Bongo's Bingos nights around the UK as well as events in Dubai and Australia, hosted by 18 different teams and the company as whole employs 120 people.

Celebrity performers have included David Hasselhoff, the Vengaboys, B*Witched and Kelis, while Samuel L. Jackson made an unannounced appearance at a Glasgow show.

== Legal case ==
In 2020 Burke and Lacey won a case in the High Court against Camp and Furnace, who had claimed ownership of the Bongo's Bingo name and logo and a 15% stake in the business.
