= The Clause =

British indie band

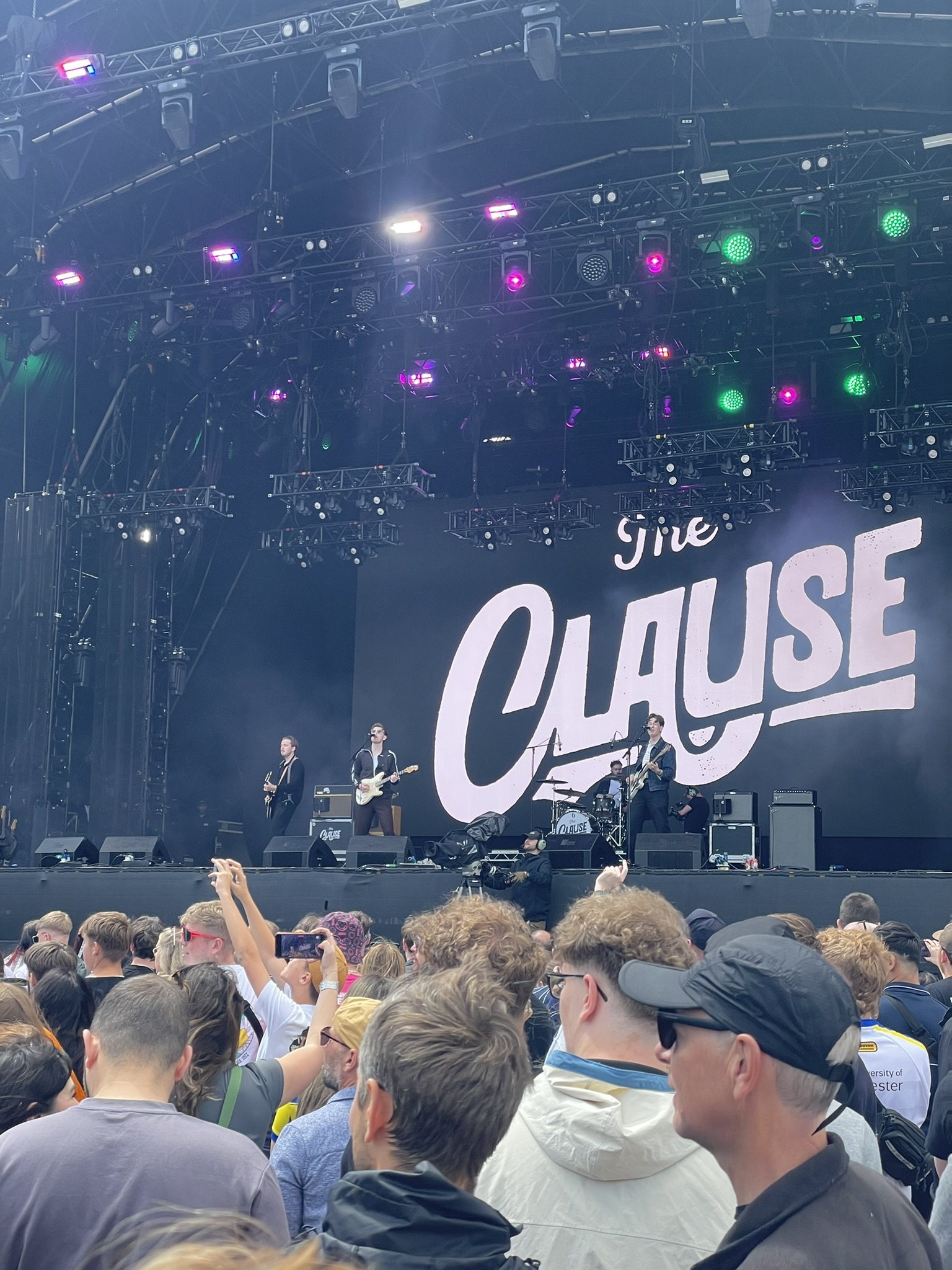
- The Clause performing at Neighbourhood Weekender, May 2025

Background information
- Origin: Birmingham, England
- Genres: Indie rock
- Years active: 2016–present
- Members: Pearce Macca; Liam Deakin; Jonny Fyffe; Niall Fennell
- Website: theclause.co.uk

The Clause are a British alternative rock band from Birmingham, England, formed in the 2010s. The group consists of Pearce “Macca” (vocals, guitar), Liam Deakin (guitar), Jonny Fyffe (bass), and Niall Fennell (drums). Their music blends elements of indie rock, funk, rhythm and blues, drawing influences from 1960s swagger, 1980s groove, and 1990s attitude. The band released their debut studio album, Victim of a Casual Thing, in October 2025.

== History ==
=== Formation and early years ===
The Clause were formed in Birmingham by childhood friends Pearce, Jonny, and Niall, later joined by guitarist Liam Deakin. The members met through the city's local music scene while still in school. By the late 2010s, the band had begun performing across Birmingham and the wider Midlands region, establishing a reputation for energetic live performances.

Their 2019 single In My Element reached number 1 on the UK iTunes Rock Chart and number 46 on the overall UK iTunes Chart. The release was accompanied by independent promotion, with the band operating without a record label or management.

=== 2020–2024: Touring and development ===
Throughout the early 2020s, The Clause gained traction through national touring and festival appearances. They supported established British acts including The Snuts, The Pigeon Detectives, and The Enemy, and performed on stages at major UK festivals such as the Isle of Wight Festival.

The group achieved multiple iTunes Rock Chart No. 1 singles and secured playlisting on major streaming platforms, including Spotify’s All New Rock and Apple Music’s New in Rock.

=== 2025: Victim of a Casual Thing ===
In October 2025, The Clause released their debut album Victim of a Casual Thing. The album chronicles the band’s transition from adolescence to adulthood, exploring themes of frustration, ambition, and self-discovery. Vocalist Pearce described the record as “the sound of feeling lost and insignificant in a city that doesn’t slow down, and the fight to rise above it.”

Following the album's release, the band announced a headline UK tour, including a homecoming performance at O2 Academy Birmingham in December 2025.

== Discography ==
=== Studio albums ===
List of studio albums, with selected details and chart positions
Title	Details	Peak chart positions		
Title	Details	UK	UK Indie	SCO
Victim of a Casual Thing	Released: 24 October 2025; Label: The Clause; Formats: Cassette, CD, digital download, LP, streaming	19	1	11

=== Extended plays ===
List of extended plays, with selected details and chart positions
Title	Details	Peak chart positions		
Title	Details	UK	UK Indie	SCO
Forever Young	Released: 13 July 2022; Label: The Clause; Formats: Digital download, streaming	–	–	–
Pop Culture	Released: 17 November 2023; Label: The Clause; Formats: Digital download, streaming	–	–	–
Weekend Millionaire	Released: 18 October 2024; Label: The Clause; Formats: Digital download, streaming	–	24	88
