= Krystal Klear =

DJ and music producer from Ireland

- Born: Declan Lennon; County Dublin, Ireland
- Occupation: DJ

Krystal Klear (Declan "Dec" Lennon) is an Irish DJ and music producer who lives in New York. His debut record was Tried for Your Love.

== Early life ==
Dec Lennon, known as "Krystal Klear", is from South Dublin.

== Discography ==
- Neutron Dance
- Tried For Your Love - All City Records - (2010)
- Greensilver - Dub Organizer - (2010)
- Never Thought You Would Go (with Olivier Day Soul) - Eglo Records - (2011)
- More Attention - MadTech Records - (2012)
- We're Wrong - All City Records - (2012)
- Addiction - Rinse/Sony - (2013)
- Squad - Cold Tonic - (2014)
- Dance (7)FS - Cold Tonic - (2014)
- Ca$h Champagne (featuring Flex W) - Cold Tonic - (2014)
- Welcome To Pleasure (featuring Maurice Alexander and Tuff City Kids) - (2015)
- Squad Part II'' - Cold Tonic - (2016)
- Danceteria / Keith Haring - Cold Tonic - (2017)
- Club Studies - Hot Haus Recs - (2018)
