= Sunset Sons =

British-Australian indie band

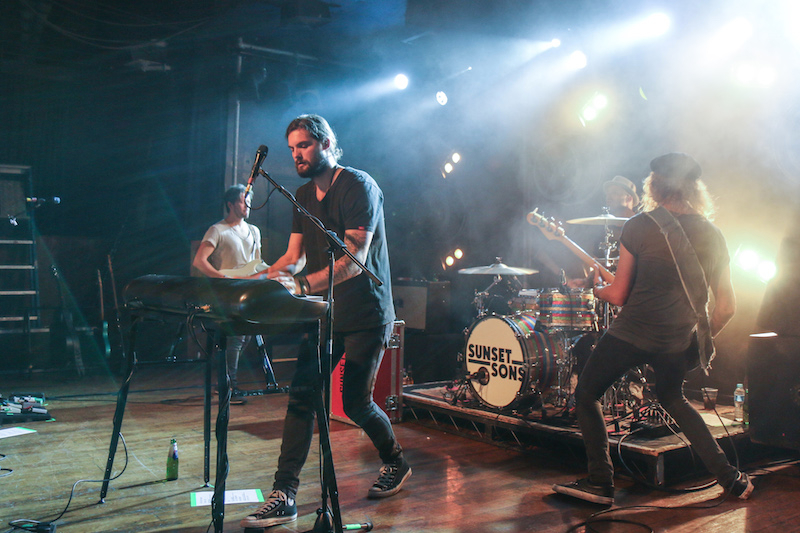

Background information
- Origin: Hossegor, France
- Genre: Indie rock
- Years active: 2013–present
- Labels: Polydor, LAB Records, Vagrant Records, Kobalt Music, French Exit, Bad Influence, AntiFragile
- Members: Rory Williams; Jed Laidlaw; Pete Harper
- Past members: Robin Windram
- Website: www.sunsetsons.com

Sunset Sons are a three-piece British-Australian indie band, based out of the town of Hossegor, in the Landes region of the south west of France, known as 'The European Surfing Capital'.

The band have released five EPs and three albums. They have toured throughout the UK, Ireland, Europe and the west coast of the US.

== Formation ==
The seed of the band formed when drummer Jed Laidlaw was visiting a bar called Le Surfing, based at Estagnot beach near Hossegor, to visit a friend he had met whilst teaching surfing in the Canary Islands. That night, singer Rory Williams was performing in the bar, where he also worked washing dishes. He had moved there a year earlier on his way to Biarritz to surf. They hit it off and decided to start a band to make some money over the winter season, alongside friends Robin Windram (guitar) and Pete Harper (bass).

They originally formed a covers band called The Cheerleaders, relocating to the French Alps for the winter to perform for the young snowboard crowd in the three valleys, basing themselves predominantly in the towns of Tignes and Val d’Isere. After performing in the bars of the ski resorts, and gaining recognition for their performance style and song choices, ranging from Queens of the Stone Age, to Kanye West, they decided to write their own material.

On relocating back to Hossegor for the summer they changed their name to Sunset Sons and spent every Friday in a local dance studio writing songs. Laidlaw sent some demos to a former Sony Music Executive, who had been Laidlaw's label manager when he drummed in a previous band, and who was looking for a new management project at the time. He flew to Hossegor to see them perform four songs in a bar, and was impressed by the crowd's reaction.

The band recorded their debut demo EP in a house they rented in Hossegor over the winter, with producer James Lewis. They named it Le Surfing, after the bar where they met. The EP was self-released on 20 February 2014 and reached number 6 in the iTunes Rock Chart, which caught the attention of record companies and publishers.

The band were keen to be seen in their natural habitat, so arranged a tour of the French Alps, and a subsequent tour of surf towns in the UK, refusing to play any major cities.

== 2014–present ==
In April 2014 the track She Wants gained the accolade of ‘Next Hype’ from Zane Lowe, and was added to BBC Radio 1's ‘Introducing’ playlist. In June 2014 the band signed to Polydor Records, Vagrant Records to release several EPs and in 2015 signed to Kobalt Music to release their debut album.

Summer 2014 saw them play on the BBC Introducing stage at Reading & Leeds festival amongst others.

Their first official release, the No Bad Days EP (produced by James Lewis) was released on 28 October 2014. It went to #1 in the iTunes Rock Chart, and lead track "Remember" was added to BBC Radio 1's ‘In New Music We Trust’ playlist.

In January 2015, the band were nominated for the BBC Sound of 2015 and MTV Brand New 2015 and were named #1 XFM's Great X-Pectations for 2015. Around this time the band played a sold-out show at Hoxton Bar & Kitchen, London, and received a four star live review in The Times. This was followed by a sold out UK tour in February/March of 2015.

Their second official release, The Fall Line EP (produced by Catherine Marks) was released on March 9, 2015. It went to #1 in the iTunes Rock Chart, and lead track "Medicine" was BBC Radio 1's track of the day and added to the ’C-List’. In March 2015 the band went to Nashville to begin recording part of their debut album with producer Jacquire King (Kings of Leon, Tom Waits, Of Monsters and Men).

The band performed another sold out UK tour in April 2015, including London Scala.

In summer 2015 the band performed at Glastonbury Festival (John Peel Stage), earning a side of stage visit from Michael Eavis. They also performed at Isle of Wight Festival, T in The Park, Boardmasters, and Reading & Leeds, as well as major festivals across Europe including Hurricane, Southside, Arenal Festival.

Their third EP release, She Wants (produced by Catherine Marks and Jacquire King), was released on 23 July 2015. The lead track was a re-recording of "She Wants" from their original demo EP. The track was named Radio 1's "Track of the Day".

On 9 August 2015, the band said they were re-working their debut album, admitting that they got some of the tracks back from their time in Nashville and they could have been better, and that they would re-record certain things with an aim to finish it by end of summer 2015.

In October 2015 the band joined Imagine Dragons as the main support for their European arena tour, covering 35 dates through Germany, France, Belgium, United Kingdom, Ireland, Spain, The Netherlands, Sweden, Norway, Italy and Switzerland. The band said it was a 'massive compliment' to be asked.

On 8 October 2015 the band headlined the music segment of the World Surf League event Quiksilver Pro France. Their tracks "Blondie" and "Come Easy" were used as the highlight background music for the event.

They released a single, "On The Road" (produced by Jacquire King, a re-recording of the original demo), on 16 October 2015 through the French Exit label, to support the Imagine Dragons tour.

In January 2016 the band announced their debut album, Very Rarely Say Die, to be released on 1 April 2016.

On 18 April 2016 the band headlined surf and music festival Goldcoast Oceanfest in Croyde, Devon.

In August 2016 it was announced the band had been nominated for Best Live Act at the 2016 AIM (Association of Independent Music) Awards, alongside Wolf Alice, Babymetal, Caravan Palace and Courteeners.

The band subsequently embarked on a UK and European tour culminating in a sold-out show at London's Shepherds Bush Empire.

In January 2018 it was announced guitarist Robin Windram had left the band to concentrate on his family. At the same time the band announced they had been in the studio with producer Catherine Marks, an EP The River was released in 2018 and the band supported Nothing But Thieves on their UK tour.

In August 2019 the band announced their second album Blood Rush Déjà Vu on Bad Influence, also produced by Catherine Marks, would be released on 1 November 2019.

The band released two singles during the lockdown of 2020 'Rum & Coca Loca' and 'Smile'. They subsequently signed to New York's AntiFragile records for a third album yet to be announced.

Their songs "Remember" and "Medicine" are included in the video game Guitar Hero Live. The band appeared on a BBC Radio 1 show on 27 October 2015 to talk about music video games.

Their song "Watch Your Back" was used in the Netflix show "Bloodlines".

In an interview with The Sound Lab in November 2019, the band stated they would be touring extensively and performing at as many festivals as possible. They also stated that new music would not be too far away, with shorter periods between new releases than with previous singles.

The band has achieved a certain degree of popularity since 2016 due to the appearance of some of their songs such as: "Remember", "Blondie", "Medicine", "On the Road", "VROL", "Love Lights" and "Heroes" as part of the soundtrack of the soccer video game saga Dream League Soccer by developer First Touch Games. More specifically in deliveries: DLS 16, DLS 17, DLS 19 and DLS 20.

== Members ==
- Rory Williams (lead vocals, keys)
- Jed Laidlaw (drums)
- Pete Harper (bass)

=== Past members ===
- Robin Windram (guitar, backing vocals)

=== Touring Members ===
- Henry Eastham (guitar, backing vocals)

== Discography ==
Albums

- Very Rarely Say Die (2016)
- Blood Rush Déjà Vu (2019)
- Too Many Humans, Not Enough Souls (2022)

Extended plays

- Le Surfing EP (2014)
- No Bad Days EP (2014)
- The Fall Line EP (2015)
- She Wants EP (2015)
- The River EP (2018)
