= Skeggs =

Skeggs or Skegg is a surname, and may refer to:

- Beverley Skeggs (born 1950), English academic
- Bruce Skeggs (1932–2013), Australian politician
- Sir Cliff Skeggs (1931–2025), New Zealand businessman
- David Skegg (born 1947), New Zealand epidemiologist
- Emily Skeggs (born 1990), American actress and singer
- Roy Skeggs (1934-2018), English film producer for Hammer Films

== See also ==
- Skeg
- Skegss, Australian surf band
