= Feet (band) =

English indie band

Feet are a five-piece musical group from Coventry, England. They formed in 2016 while band members were studying at Coventry University and were originally signed to Felix White's Yala! Records.

== Discography ==
=== Albums ===
- What's Inside Is More Than Just Ham (2019)
- Make It Up (2024)

=== Singles and EPs ===
- "Petty Thieving" (2017)
- "Vegetarian Christmas" (2019)
- "Walking Machine" (2021)
- "Can't Get In" (2023)
- "Changing My Mind Again" (2023)
- "The Real Thing" (2024)
- "Why Would I lie?" (2024)
- "Sit Down" (2024)
- "Goodbye (So Long, Farewell)" (2024)
- "Greasy Boy" (2024)
- "Number One" (2024)
