= Mella Dee =

- Born: Ryan Aitchison; Doncaster, England
- Citizenship: United Kingdom
- Occupations: DJ; record producer
- Years active: 2010-present
- Musical career
- Genres: Techno; House; UK garage

Ryan Aitchison, known professionally as Mella Dee (pronounced Melody), is an English DJ and record producer, best known for his 2017 single "Techno Disco Tool". "Techno Disco Tool" was certified Silver by the British Phonographic Industry (BPI) in 2022.
