= Wille and the Bandits =

British band

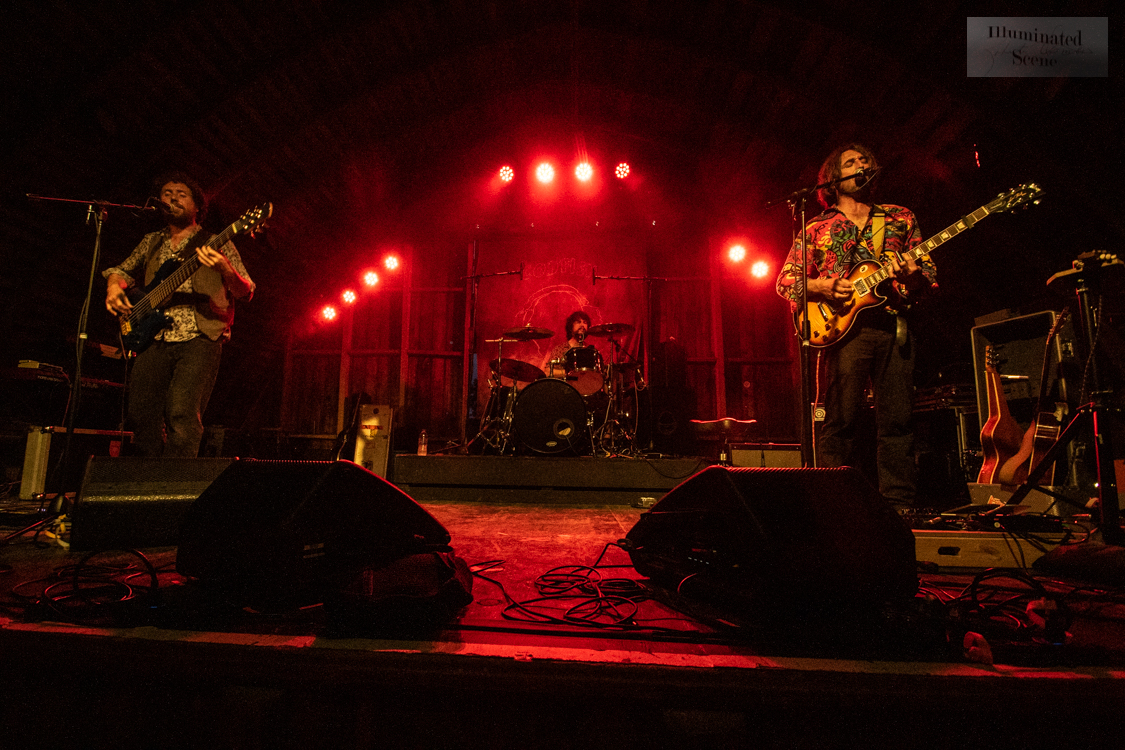

Background information
- Origin: Cornwall, England
- Genres: Rock, Blues, Folk, Latin
- Years active: 2010–present
- Members: Wille Edwards; Stevie Watts; Harry Mackaill; Zachariah O'Loughlin
- Past members: Matthew Brooks; Andrew Naumann; Kieran Doherty; Ed Oliver; Matthew Gallagher; Finn McAuley
- Website: www.willeandthebandits.com

Wille and the Bandits are a British-based band who play a variety of different genres spanning across the blues, rock, Latin and folk styles. The band currently consists of Wille Edwards, Stevie Watts, Harry Mackaill and Zachariah O'Loughlin. To date, they have released eight studio albums and three live albums.

== History ==
Forming in 2010, Wille and The Bandits are band from Cornwall, England, taking their inspiration from a variety of artists such as Pearl Jam, Ben Harper and Jimi Hendrix. Additionally, the band have played at festivals such as Glastonbury, Isle of Wight, Greenman, Shambala and Greenbelt. The band was chosen as one of three top unsigned bands in the United Kingdom by the Daily Telegraph. Edwards is sponsored by Anderwood guitars and received his own signature Weissenborn from them.

The band were listed in the top ten must-see bands at Glastonbury 2014 by BBC Radio 1.

Both 2014 and 2015 saw Wille and The Bandits headline multiple shows in countries such as Germany, Switzerland, Holland, France, Belgium, Italy, Poland and Austria. The band were invited to perform on the German television show Rockpalast.

Long-serving members Matthew Brooks and Andrew Naumann both left the band at the end of 2019 for personal reasons.

== Discography ==
=== Studio albums ===
- Samsara (EP) 2007
- New Breed 2010
- Breakfree 2012
- Grow 2013
- Steal 2017
- Paths 2019
- When the World Stood Still 2022
- Salt Roots 2026

=== Live albums ===
- Live in Gouvy 2013
- Living Free 2018
- The Kernow Sessions 2023

== Members ==
- Wille Edwards – lead vocals, guitar, Weissenborn, lap steel, dobro
- Stevie Watts – keyboards, hammond organ, backing vocals
- Harry Mackaill – bass, acoustic guitar, backing vocals
- Zachariah O'Loughlin – drums, percussion, backing vocals
