= Panda (musician) =

Dutch electronic music artist

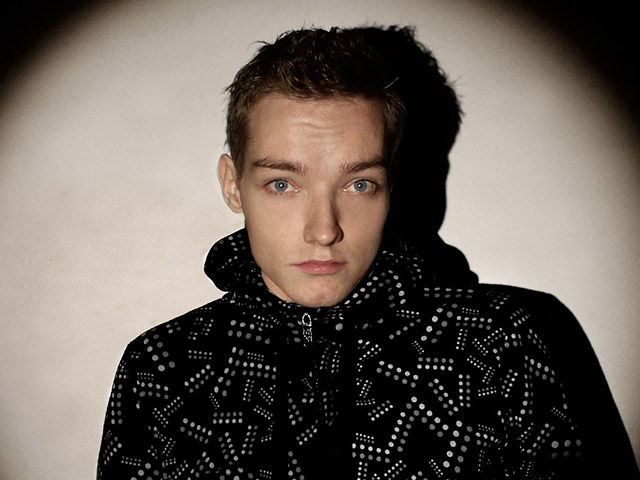
- Panda

Background information
- Also known as: Peet
- Born: Nijmegen, Netherlands
- Origin: Amsterdam, Netherlands
- Genres: Electronica, drum and bass, urban, dance
- Occupation: Music producer
- Years active: 2003–2015
- Labels: Wildlife
- Website: pandamixshow.com

Panda is a Dutch electronic music artist living in Amsterdam, specializing in drum and bass. He gained an interest in electronic music in his teenage years. He was inspired to write electronic music after seeing a live performance by an electronic music act in his birthplace Nijmegen. Panda's tracks have been aired on all premier drum & bass radio stations including BBC Radio 1 and many major drum and bass performers have played Panda's music in clubs.

== Discography ==
Panda previously released on the experimental jungle label Exegene Records and Foundname Records under the stage name of Peet.

Panda released his debut album Retake Manhattan in 2008. It is a concept album themed around the 400-year anniversary of the discovery of New York by the Dutch. It features 14 tracks which represent a fictitious journey around the world. It has been supported and played by many artists in the drum and bass scene both in clubs, on radio and podcasts including BBC Radio 1, BBC Radio 1Xtra, Kool FM, the Drum and Bass Arena podcast by artists including Fresh, Mary Anne Hobbs and Paul B. The single Baghdad was a featured Drum & Bass Download on BBC Radio 1Xtra. The album itself was a featured release on the Dutch 3VOOR12 Luisterpaal.

== Awards and competitions ==
Panda has been nominated Best Drum and Bass Producer at the Drum and Bass Awards in the Netherlands. He has played as a DJ at such venues like the Paard van Troje, Bibelot, Winston Kingdom, Bazart, Escape, Metropool in the Netherlands and the Pool Bar club in London. Panda has organized two contrasting club nights; ONE in Nijmegen targeted popular drum & bass and Reaktor in The Hague targeted heavier drum and bass music.

Panda has won several competitions with his music. One of the most notable was a production competition between two major drum & bass websites, Dogs on Acid and Drum & Bass Arena. The competition was judged by drum & bass musician John B, who picked Panda's music as favorite. Other notable competitions include the production competition for the premier Dutch drum & bass website DNBforum.nl where he entered first place. On the radio, the drum and bass magazine Knowledge chose one of his tracks as best unsigned track.

== Panda Mix Show ==
In addition to music production, in 2009, Panda launched an electronic music network on YouTube called the Panda Mix Show. The channel features guest mixes by artists like Sub Focus and DJ Fresh and has a subscriber base of 300,000 with over 100 million YouTube views as of 2014. It also features in the iTunes Podcast Top 100.
