= Rat Attack! =

1999 video game

- North American Nintendo 64 box art
- Developer: Pure Entertainment
- Publisher: Mindscape
- Composers: Andrew Melvin, Harry Holmwood, Allister Brimble
- Platforms: Nintendo 64, PlayStation, Microsoft Windows
- Release: PlayStation: NA: 28 September 1999; EU: 15 October 1999; Nintendo 64: PAL: 21 April 2000; NA: 12 September 2000; Windows: ITA: 2005; UK: July 2007
- Genre: Puzzle
- Modes: Single-player, multiplayer

Rat Attack! is an arcade-style puzzle game for the Nintendo 64 and PlayStation. It was first released on the PlayStation in 1999, and later on the Nintendo 64 in 2000 (the latter console version originally had a slated May 1999 release date in Europe before it was delayed); it was later ported to Microsoft Windows in 2005 in Italy, and in July 2007 in the UK. The PlayStation version was re-released on GOG in 2025. Its theme is about a group of 'Scratch Cats' stopping an invasion of 'evil mutant space rats'. It received mixed reviews after its several years in development. The game was slightly altered for its Nintendo 64 release, switching out one of the characters and changing a series of levels.

== Story ==
A pair of lab rats, Washington and Jefferson, were sent into space aboard a rocket in an experiment. However, after some incident in space, the rats had been mutated and gained super-intelligence. Over forty years on, they have returned to earth and immediately commenced with plans for world domination, amassing a huge army of rats with instructions to destroy everything in sight.

The felines of the world band together to combat this menace forming a group called the 'Scratch Cats'. Headed by cat genius Professor Rex Julius, they fight off these rats with several of his inventions which eliminate the rats in a humane way.

Professor Rex Julius sent his special agent Pearl to investigate, but Washington and Jefferson managed to capture her, imprisoning her within a laser cage guarded by giant robots.

They go from location to location, cleaning up the rats. Along the way, they meet another mysterious cat in the clutches of King Scarab, known as Banubis in the original PlayStation version, and Atomicat in the Nintendo 64 port.

At the end of the game with all the areas saved from the ravaging rat army, the Scratch Cats manage to defeat Washington and Jefferson in a showdown in their space base. However, after the duo manage to escape their defeat, Julius afterwards revealing that they also taken King Scarab with them.

== Gameplay ==
Top: PlayStation version, showing Banubis in the "Factory" area. Bottom: Nintendo 64 version, showing Atomicat in the "Temple" area. Both locations in the same room only items and the room's textures are different.

In single-player mode a single Scratch Cat enters a room, from its walls pours an endless supply of rats. The player must catch and eliminate a certain number of these before a door will appear taking them to the next room. Each area has several rooms, in its particular theme.

The object of the game is to clear each level of the allotted number of rats and continue on to the next room. The player uses a loop-like lasso called an 'Eraticator' to catch the rats. With them trapped the player then must take the rats to the 'Destructor Pad', located in each of the rat-filled rooms, to dispose of them. If the player is bumped by a rat or other damaging item in the room, the rats can escape the trap until they've been eliminated by the 'Destructor'.

At the end of each level, the player receives bonuses reflecting how well they had done. Such as receiving "Damage Bonuses" for how much the room got damaged (the less damage, the higher points), time bonuses (the less time taken, the higher the bonus), and perfect bonuses (if none of the items in the room got destroyed, the player obtains these points.)

In most of the rooms, various power-ups will occasionally appear to help the player, they can also be found in treasure chests, which require eliminating a certain number of rats at the same time. These power-ups allow such things as, some of the damage done by the rats to be reversed, allowing the player to avoid taking damage for a short time or get back one energy that they lost. Other effects are making the player able to grow large and stomp on the rats, to run much faster, or make the lasso bigger. There is also bate to attract the rats to one location. Besides these power-ups, there are also power-downs, that are released by the rats when they destroy a box or other things. Resulting in the players controls being reversed, rats being ejected out of their trap, or slowing down, and other such features.

Later gameplay also introduces things like switches, fans, laser beams, and teleporters. Thus, adding puzzle elements to the game. Requiring the player to figure out how to use the various devices before the items in the room get destroyed.

The rats themselves can hurt the player if they touch them. They can also jump out the lasso if not stunned by a claw swipe or other type of attack. They can climb up large walls, and be duplicated by a 'Rat Copier'. A special white rat is in several rooms, these have the purpose of only getting to a Mutation Pad and then transforming into a monstrous rat that hunts down the player.

At the end of each area, there is a boss that the player must defeat. However, the Scratch Cats can't harm the bosses directly. The player must figure out how to harm the boss, in most cases by using their attack against them.

In multiplayer mode the gameplay is almost identical, but with a few additions such as a 'Gold Rat' worth more points, and a few additional power-ups/downs. The players can also choose a special mode which allows them to go after rats of their own color.

== Characters ==
Each cat has different abilities when the game starts, as well as their own special attack which can be used if they get a certain number of 'Cat Coins'. The Scratch Cats are made up of the following members:

- Professor Rex Julius - The genius behind it all, who organized the society, and provided the agents with the gadgets. He's brown, and looked a bit like Albert Einstein with a lab coat and mustache.
- Newton - Newton is Rex Julius's trusty robotic cat sidekick, who is used to deliver Rex Julius' mission briefings throughout the game. He's small and yellow (looking a bit like a cat potato head).
- Hai-Jinx - A Siamese Cat that wears a Ying-Yang symbol on his head, a belt around his body and wields twin Katanas (although he only used them for his special attack), he likes making origami.
- Sparky - Sparky is a young, English magician cat. He's dark blue with lighter blue ears, and a crescent moon shaped pendant.
- Manx - Manx is a striped yellow and orange manx cat, who has grown up in the Bronx. He's impatient and aggressive, with scars on his left eye, and he wears an earring on his right ear.
- Muffy DuPont - Muffy is a French cat, who is white with a black mask and tummy. She has a heart shaped pendant. Her owner is a burglar, and she had committed some robberies herself.
- Bob Cat - Bob Cat is an English Boxing cat. He's grey, wears red shorts and wears bandages wrapped around his paws. Bob Cat's hatred of rats goes back to the dark days when the evil rats kidnapped his younger brother, Thumps and nibbed off part of Bob's ear.
- Smokey - Smokey is a Swiss cat, who is grey and wears goggles, a crazy suit, and carries a laser gun.
- Pearl - Pearl is the kidnapped special agent, who is blue with a yellow top and wears roller skates, making her the fastest character. She is an unlockable character, and can be obtained on normal or hard mode after defeating the boss at the Factory/Temple.
- Banubis/Atomicat - Banubis is an Ancient Egyptian cat, who is orange with a Pharaoh headdress. He appears in the PlayStation version. Atomicat - is a radioactive cat wearing sunglasses, his body glows in strips that move up and down his body. He is in the Nintendo 64 version. Both characters replace each other in their respective editions of the game, they are an unlockable character obtained on normal or hard mode after defeating King Scarab at the Museum.

== Development ==
The game was developed by Pure Entertainment, a company founded in April 1996. The title took several years to be fully developed. During this time it was given different temporary names such as "Rat", "Cats & Rats", before finally settling on Rat Attack. While the game was still in development, early versions of the game were sent to news media resulting in early development screenshots of levels not included in the game.

A series of six animated Flash videos were also produced, each telling the story of one of the 'Scratch Cats'. Shortly before the game's release, an early development version was released as a demo for Official UK PlayStation Magazine.

== Reception ==
Reception

Aggregate score
Aggregator	Score	
Aggregator	N64	PS
GameRankings	61%	48%

Review scores
Publication	Score	
Publication	N64	PS
AllGame	N/A	4/5
CNET Gamecenter	N/A	5/10
Computer and Video Games	N/A	3/5
Electronic Gaming Monthly	N/A	5/10
EP Daily	N/A	5/10
Game Informer	N/A	6.75/10
GameRevolution	N/A	B−
GameSpot	N/A	2.7/10
IGN	5.5/10	5.8/10
N64 Magazine	70%	N/A
Nintendo Power	6.3/10	N/A

The Nintendo 64 version received mixed reviews, while the PlayStation version received unfavourable reviews, according to the review aggregation website GameRankings. N64 Magazine said that the N64 version was a "Simple, well executed puzzle-em-up, with cats trying to catch rats." Fran Mirabella III of IGN described the gameplay and premise of catching rats and disposing of them as being similar to Ghostbusters. Mirabella compared the camera of the game to a yo-yo, in that "the camera hangs overhead bobbing and swinging about." He criticized the game's music, saying "The composers must have literally created about 25 seconds of MIDI audio and looped it", and disapproved of the game's graphics, saying that "character models suck badly" and "Even the title screen has a horrible eye-burning font and sloppy art." Nintendo Power gave the European import a mixed review while the U.S. version was still in development.

In a review for AllGame, Span Bennet examined the PlayStation version with more affection saying, "The '50s decor and vivid color give Rat Attack a unique look that only adds to its appeal", concluding that, "It is a game with a unique look and feel, coupled with sound and playability that are top notch." Jeff Gerstmann of GameSpot summed up the game with the following: "Rat Attack is an extremely forgettable title that isn't worth a first look, let alone a second one." GamePro said of the same PlayStation version, "The game's elementary nature makes it easy to learn but will probably leave older gamers cold, unless they get hooked on the multiplayer mode. But if you like the arcade machines of yore, nibble on Rat Attack." (Note: GamePro gave the PlayStation version all 3.5/5 scores for graphics, sound, control, and fun factor.)
