= P-rallel =

British music producer (born 1999)

- Born: Gio; June 8, 1999 (age 27); Acton, London, United Kingdom
- Genres: House; dance; jungle
- Occupation: Producer
- Years active: 2016–present
- Labels: Black Butter Records; Different Recordings
- Website: www.p-rallel.com

Gio (born 8 June 1999), known professionally as p-rallel, is a British electronic music producer and DJ. A member of musical collective Elevation/Meditation, he has worked with such artists as Slowthai, Playboi Carti, and Central Cee.

== Early life ==
Gio was born on June 6, 1999, in Acton to a family of Jamaican and Bajan heritage. He has described his parents as "ravers"; his father and grandfather are both musicians, with his father working as a multi-genre DJ performing under the name Touchtee. He started playing piano at six years old.

== Career ==
=== Pre-2016: Boy Blue Entertainment ===
While having been a part of a steel pan group as early as 2012, Gio's primary focus before music was dancing, which he picked up at nine years old. He performed with the group Boy Blue Entertainment, where he was inspired by the group's music producer, as well as their choreographer. His last performance with the group was in 2015 in the Barbican Centre.

=== 2016-2018: The Soul Trip ===
As a teenager, he would respond to Twitter callouts looking for studio sessions, which led to him having a studio session at his parents' house with Rejjie Snow and Playboi Carti when he was sixteen. He also worked with Zach Fox as a DJ, and eventually ran sessions in Lily Allen's London studio. He founded the collective Elevation/Meditation, which mainly operated from the studio he had built in his bedroom.

Gio's stage name, p-rallel, comes from the concept of parallel theory. His first EP, called The Soul Trip, came out in September 2016 and included Lord Apex among its features. Before being signed to a label he released several singles on Spotify with fellow Elevation/Meditation member Finn Foxell.

=== 2019-2021: Different Recordings ===
In October of 2019, Gio was signed to Different Recordings. His first work under them was his second EP In Due Time, featuring Lava La Rue and Sam Wise. His second and final project with Different Records was his third EP Soundboy, which featured Greentea Peng, Venna, Louis Culture, Nayana Iz and Lord Apex. The remix of his song with Greentea Peng, "soulboy", by producer IZCO is his most popular song on Spotify.

=== 2021-present: Black Butter Records ===
After releasing the single "Blue Denim Jeans" with Lauren Faith (later remixed by Nia Archives), Gio switched labels to 4ZA Music/Black Butter Records. He then began his next release cycle for his fourth EP Forward, which alongside some of his former collaborators featured Jeshi, Rachel Chinouriri, and Jords. After the EP came out in 2021, Gio released two more singles with Hak Baker and Roses Gabor before starting to release songs later to be included on his first and only so far LP, the mixtape Movement. The track "It's A Lundun Thing" off the album, which sampled a 1997 song by Scott Garcia, became a local hit, being played in many clubs around London. The album's other songs featured Tamera and Toddla T.

== Influences ==
Gio has cited Michael Jackson, Timbaland, Darkchild, Moodymann, Kaytranada, and Missy Elliott as major inspirations. One of the most important qualities to him in songwriting is soulfulness, and he refers to D'Angelo's "Spanish Joint" as being one of the best examples of this in music. He mixes a lot of genres in his music, including garage, house, jungle, reggae, amapiano, funk, soul, jazz, and rap. His music is notably influenced by the sound of the 1990s.

== Discography ==
=== Mixtapes ===
Title	Details
Movement	Released: October 27, 2023; Label: Black Butter Records

=== EPs ===
Title	Details
The Soul Trip	Released: September 18, 2016; Label: Independent
In Due Time	Released: November 6, 2019; Label: Different Recordings
Soundboy	Released: July 31, 2020; Label: Different Recordings
Forward	Released: March 25, 2022; Label: Black Butter Records
Can't Be Me	Released: March 28, 2025; Label: Nevermind Records, Ditto Plus
SELECTA	Released: November 14, 2025; Label: Nevermind Records, Ditto Plus
