= Europe's Biggest Dance Show 2023 =

International radio special

- Genre: Dance
- Running time: 330 minutes (6:30 pm – 12:00 am)
- Country of origin: Austria; Belgium; Estonia; Finland; Germany; Norway; Spain; Sweden; Ukraine; United Kingdom
- Language: primarily English
- Home station: BBC Radio 1
- Syndicates: 1LIVE; FM4; Fritz iCat; NRK mP3; Raadio 2 Radio Promin; Studio Brussel; SR P3; YleX
- Produced by: Dan Morris
- Original release: 22 September – 22 September 2023
- Audio format: Stereophonic sound
- Website: Europe's Biggest Dance Show

Europe's Biggest Dance Show 2023 was the sixth iteration of Europe's Biggest Dance Show, a multi-nation dance music simulcast hosted by BBC Radio 1, in collaboration with European radio stations 1LIVE, FM4, Fritz, NRK mP3, Radio Promin, Studio Brussel, SR P3, YleX, and for the first time, iCat and Raadio 2.

== Background ==
The British Broadcasting Corporation (BBC) announced on 14 September 2023 that the sixth iteration of Europe's Biggest Dance Show would take place on 22 September.

The simulcast started at 18:30 BST, with Danny Howard introducing for BBC Radio 1 in London. As was the case in 2021 and 2022, each radio station contributed 30 minutes of dance music from their respective country. Each radio station sent their feeds to Broadcasting House in London, where they were mixed by BBC senior technical producer Dan Morris before being sent back to the radio receiver stations for broadcast.

iCat from Spain and Raadio 2 from Estonia contributed for the first time.

== Running order ==
Time (BST)	Country of origin	Radio station	DJ(s)	Presenter(s)
18:30	United Kingdom	BBC Radio 1	Patrick Topping	Danny Howard
19:00	Finland	YleX	DJ Orion	
19:30	Sweden	SR P3	Icona Pop	Tina Mehrafzoon
20:00	Germany	1LIVE	Marten Hørger	Jan-Christian Zeller
20:30	Germany	Fritz	Southstar	Bruno Dietel
21:00	Norway	NRK mP3	Kygo and CLMD	Abiel Tesfai and Martin Holmen
21:30	Belgium	Studio Brussel	Amber Broos and Jeroen Delodder	
22:00	Austria	FM4	DJ Functionist	
22:30	Spain	iCat	Miqui Puig	
23:00	Estonia	Raadio 2	Madison Mars	Marta Püssa
23:30	Ukraine	Radio Promin	Leopold Levsky	Denis Denisenko

== See also ==
- Europe's Biggest Dance Show
