= Europe's Biggest Dance Show 2025 =

International radio special

- Genre: Dance
- Running time: 360 minutes (6:00 pm – 12:00 am)
- Country of origin: Austria; Belgium; Estonia; Finland; Germany; Ireland; Netherlands; Norway; Sweden; Ukraine; United Kingdom
- Language: primarily English
- Home station: BBC Radio 1
- Syndicates: 1LIVE; FM4; Fritz; NPO 3FM; NRK mP3; Raadio 2 Radio Promin; RTÉ 2fm Studio Brussel; SR P3; YleX
- Original release: 26 September 2025
- Audio format: Stereophonic sound
- Website: Europe's Biggest Dance Show

Europe's Biggest Dance Show 2025 is the eighth iteration of Europe's Biggest Dance Show, a multi-nation dance music simulcast hosted by BBC Radio 1, in collaboration with eleven radio stations across Europe: 1LIVE, FM4, Fritz, NPO 3FM, NRK mP3, Raadio 2, Radio Promin, RTÉ 2fm, Studio Brussel, SR P3 and YleX.

== Background ==
The British Broadcasting Corporation (BBC) announced on 22 September 2025 that the eighth iteration of Europe's Biggest Dance Show would take place on 26 September with twelve radio stations in eleven countries participating, the largest number of participants in the history of the simulcast.

The simulcast started at 18:00 BST, with Danny Howard introducing for BBC Radio 1 in London. As has been the case since the 2021 edition, each radio station contributed 30 minutes of dance music from their respective country and sent their feeds to Broadcasting House in London for mixing purposes, before the feeds were sent back to the radio stations for broadcast.

NPO 3FM from the Netherlands returned after not participating in the 2023 and 2024 editions. For the first time in its history, the simulcast was preceded by a one-hour pre-show titled The Warm-Up with Danny Howard, which began at 17:00 BST. This part of the event was not broadcast on Radio 1 itself.

During the set of BUNT. provided by Radio Fritz, the broadcast was interrupted by Danny Howard due to explicit lyrics being played uncensored in the song "Best Day of My Life (BUNT. Version)". They left the broadcast of Fritz and proceeded to play other tracks from BUNT. until the original broadcast moved onto the next track of the set. This inadvertently caused a loss of signal for the other participating stations, and subsequent dead air.

Tommy Cash, who represented Estonia in the Eurovision Song Contest 2025, was the DJ for Estonia's Raadio 2. His Eurovision entry "Espresso Macchiato" was played during Estonia's timeslot in the simulcast.

The simulcast was also aired in Latvia on Latvijas Radio 5 as part of its music show Radio Pieci Ieraksti, where a portion of BBC Radio 1's timeslot was preempted to include a live link-up featuring a mix by Latvian DJ Linda Samsonova in Riga. The Latvian broadcast was hosted by Toms Putniņš, Kristers Karlsons and Matīss Kaktiņš.

== Running order ==
Time (BST)	Country of origin	Radio station	DJ(s)	Presenter(s)
18:00	United Kingdom	BBC Radio 1	Danny Howard	
18:30	Ireland	RTÉ 2fm	Jenny Greene	
19:00	Germany	1LIVE	Malugi	Jan-Christian Zeller
19:30	Germany	Fritz	Avaion x BUNT.	Bruno Dietel
20:00	Austria	FM4	Ely Oaks	Kristian Davideck
20:30	Sweden	SR P3	Otto Knows	Calle Dernulf and Linda Nordeman
21:00	Estonia	Raadio 2	Tommy Cash	Marta Püssa
21:30	Belgium	Studio Brussel	Amber Broos	
22:00	Norway	NRK mP3	AILO	Tamanna Agnihotri
22:30	Finland	YleX	DJ Orion	
23:00	Netherlands	NPO 3FM	DJ Benwal	Justin Verkijk
23:30	Ukraine	Radio Promin	DJ LeoLevsky	Denis Denisenko

== See also ==
- Europe's Biggest Dance Show
