= Europe's Biggest Dance Show 2024 =

International radio special

- Genre: Dance
- Running time: 330 minutes (6:30 pm – 12:00 am)
- Country of origin: Austria; Belgium; Estonia; Finland; Germany; Ireland; Norway; Sweden; Ukraine; United Kingdom
- Language: primarily English
- Home station: BBC Radio 1
- Syndicates: 1LIVE; FM4; Fritz; NRK mP3; Raadio 2 Radio Promin; RTÉ Pulse; Studio Brussel; SR P3; YleX
- Original release: 20 September 2024
- Audio format: Stereophonic sound
- Website: Europe's Biggest Dance Show

Europe's Biggest Dance Show 2024 is the seventh iteration of Europe's Biggest Dance Show, a multi-nation dance music simulcast hosted by BBC Radio 1, in collaboration with ten radio stations across Europe: 1LIVE, FM4, Fritz, NRK mP3, Raadio 2, Radio Promin, RTÉ Pulse (Note: Credited in the simulcast as RTÉ 2FM), Studio Brussel, SR P3 and YleX.

== Background ==
The British Broadcasting Corporation (BBC) announced on 14 September 2024 that the seventh iteration of Europe's Biggest Dance Show would take place on 22 September.

The simulcast started at 18:30 BST, with Danny Howard introducing for BBC Radio 1 in London. As has been the case since 2021, each radio station contributed 30 minutes of dance music from their respective country and sent their feeds to Broadcasting House in London for mixing purposes, before the feeds were sent back to the radio stations for broadcast.

RTÉ 2FM from Ireland returned after withdrawing from the 2023 iteration, but due to coverage of Culture Night on RTÉ 2FM, the simulcast aired on its sister station, RTÉ Pulse. However, on-air imaging still referred to the Irish participation as being from RTÉ 2FM.

== Running order ==
| Time (BST) | Country of origin | Radio station | DJ(s) | Presenter(s) |
|---|---|---|---|---|
| 18:30 | United Kingdom | BBC Radio 1 | Chris Lake | Danny Howard |
| 19:00 | Sweden | SR P3 | Killen. | Tina Mehrafzoon |
| 19:30 | Finland | YleX | DJ Orion | |
| 20:00 | Germany | 1LIVE | Adam Port | Jan-Christian Zeller |
| 20:30 | Germany | Fritz | Stella Bossi | Bruno Dietel |
| 21:00 | Estonia | Raadio 2 | Syn Cole | Marta Püssa |
| 21:30 | Norway | NRK mP3 | Nora | Anna Nor Sørensen |
| 22:00 | Belgium | Studio Brussel | Bert van Steenberghe | |
| 22:30 | Austria | FM4 | Oberst & Buchner | Dalia Ahmed |
| 23:00 | Ireland | RTÉ Pulse | Jenny Greene | |
| 23:30 | Ukraine | Radio Promin | DJ LeoLevsky | Denis Denisenko |

== See also ==
- Europe's Biggest Dance Show
