= Europe's Biggest Dance Show 2022 =

International radio special

- Genre: Dance
- Running time: 330 minutes (6:30 pm – 12:00 am)
- Country of origin: Austria; Belgium; Finland; Germany; Ireland; Netherlands; Norway; Sweden; Ukraine; United Kingdom
- Language(s): primarily English
- Home station: BBC Radio 1
- Syndicates: 1LIVE; FM4; Fritz; NPO 3FM; NRK mP3; Radio Promin; RTÉ 2FM; Studio Brussel; SR P3; YleX
- Produced by: Dan Morris
- Original release: 14 October – 14 October 2022
- Audio format: Stereophonic sound
- Website: Europe's Biggest Dance Show

Europe's Biggest Dance Show 2022 was the fifth iteration of Europe's Biggest Dance Show, a multi-nation dance music simulcast hosted by BBC Radio 1, in collaboration with European radio stations 1LIVE, FM4, Fritz, NPO 3FM, NRK mP3, RTÉ 2FM, Studio Brussel, SR P3, YleX, and for the first time, Radio Promin of Ukrainian national broadcasting company UA:PBC.

== Background ==
The British Broadcasting Corporation (BBC) announced on 5 October 2022 that the fifth iteration of Europe's Biggest Dance Show would take place on 14 October.

The simulcast started at 18:30 BST, with Danny Howard introducing for BBC Radio 1 in London. As was the case for the 2021 iteration of the simulcast, each radio station contributed 30 minutes of dance music from their respective country. Each radio station sent their feeds to Broadcasting House in London, where they were mixed by BBC senior technical producer Dan Morris before being sent back to the radio stations for broadcast.

NPO 3FM from the Netherlands returned after withdrawing from the 2021 iteration, while Ukraine's Radio Promin contributed for the first time.

Dan Morris
@DanDJMorris

Back at the controls of Europe’s Biggest Dance Show tonight from 18:30BST

1830 🇬🇧 @BBCR1 1900 🇳🇴 @NRKno MP3 1930 🇩🇪 @1LIVE 2000 🇩🇪 @fritz_offiziell 2030 🇸🇪 @sverigesradio P3 2100 🇮🇪 @RTE2fm 2130 🇧🇪 @stubru 2200 🇦🇹 @radiofm4 2230 🇫🇮 @ylex 2300 🇳🇱 @npo3fm 2330 🇺🇦 @suspilne_news Radio Promin

14 October 2022

== Running order ==
Time (BST)	Country of origin	Radio station	DJ	Presenter
18:30	United Kingdom	BBC Radio 1	Dusky	Danny Howard
19:00	Norway	NRK mP3	Broiler	Abiel Tesfai
19:30	Germany	1LIVE	Topic	Jan-Christian Zeller
20:00	Germany	Fritz	Gheist	Bruno Dietel
20:30	Sweden	SR P3	Bella Boo	Samir Yosufi
21:00	Ireland	RTÉ 2FM	Jenny Greene	
21:30	Belgium	Studio Brussel	Amber Broos	
22:00	Austria	FM4	Joyce Muniz	DJ Functionist
22:30	Finland	YleX	DJ Orion	
23:00	Netherlands	NPO 3FM	Oliver Heldens	Rámon Verkoeijen
23:30	Ukraine	Radio Promin	Victoria Polchenko; DJ Leo Levsky	Denis Denisenko

== See also ==
- Europe's Biggest Dance Show
