= Europe's Biggest Dance Show 2020 =

International radio special

- BBC Radio 1's logo for the show
- Genre: Dance
- Running time: 420 minutes (8–9 May 2020); 480 minutes (23–24 October 2020)
- Country of origin: Belgium; France; Finland; Germany; Ireland; Netherlands; Norway; Sweden; United Kingdom
- Language(s): primarily English
- Home station: BBC Radio 1
- Syndicates: 1LIVE; FM4; Fritz; Mouv'; NPO 3FM; NRK mP3; RTÉ 2FM; SR P3; Studio Brussel; YleX
- Produced by: Dan Morris
- Original release: 8 May – 24 October 2020
- No. of episodes: 2
- Audio format: Stereophonic sound
- Website: BBC Radio 1

Europe's Biggest Dance Show 2020 was the second and third editions of Europe's Biggest Dance Show, a multinational dance music simulcast presented by Euroradio and hosted by BBC Radio 1, in collaboration with nine other radio stations from across Europe: 1LIVE, Fritz, Mouv', NPO 3FM, RTÉ 2FM, Studio Brussel, SR P3, and for the first time, NRK mP3 and YleX.

== Background ==
Despite the 2019 edition being billed as a one-off event, the British Broadcasting Corporation (BBC) announced on 17 April 2020 that Europe's Biggest Dance Show would return on 8 May.

The BBC subsequently announced on 27 September that the simulcast would return for a third edition on 23 October.

== Running order ==
=== May 2020 ===
The simulcast started at 19:00 BST on 8 May and finished at 02:00 BST on 9 May, with Annie Mac introducing for BBC Radio 1 in London. As was the case in 2019, eight radio stations from seven countries contributed one hour of dance music from their respective country, with the exception of 1LIVE and Fritz, who contributed 30 minutes each from Cologne and Berlin respectively.

Some stations chose to feature at least one live DJ set as part of their contribution e.g., Rebecca & Fiona for SR P3.

Each radio station sent their feeds to Broadcasting House in London, where they were mixed by BBC senior technical producer Dan Morris before being sent back to the radio stations for broadcast.

Dan Morris
@DanDJMorris

Europe’s Bigges Dance show sounding so big. Lots of smart routing & switching and circuits galore. #EBDS

8 May 2020

Time (BST)	Country	Station	Presenter	DJ(s)
19:00	United Kingdom	BBC Radio 1	Annie Mac	Pete Tong
20:00	Sweden	SR P3	Samir Yosufi	Rebecca & Fiona
21:00	Germany	1LIVE	Jan-Christian Zeller	Mashup-Germany
21:30	Germany	Fritz	Michail Stangl	Purple Disco Machine
22:00	Belgium	Studio Brussel	Jeroen Delodder	
23:00	Ireland	RTÉ 2FM	Jenny Greene	Rebūke
00:00	Netherlands	NPO 3FM	Yoeri Leeflang	Sam Feldt and Oliver Heldens
01:00	France	Mouv'	Emmy	Ayane

=== October 2020 ===
The simulcast started at 18:00 BST on 23 October and finished at 02:00 BST on 24 October, with Annie Mac introducing for BBC Radio 1 in London. As was the case in May, each radio station contributed an hour of dance music from their respective country, except in the case of 1LIVE and Fritz, who broadcast 30 minutes each from Cologne and Berlin respectively.

Having contributed to the 2019 and May 2020 editions, Mouv' did not contribute, while NRK mP3 and YleX contributed for the first time. FM4 broadcast the simulcast in Austria as part of its weekly dance music show La boum de luxe.

Each radio station sent their feeds to Broadcasting House in London, which were mixed by BBC senior technical producer Dan Morris, before being sent back to the radio stations for broadcast.

Dan Morris
@DanDJMorris

Here we go. From 6pm BST on @bbcr1 we join our European broadcast partners for #biggestdanceshow

(Hi to @scott_mills & @WillWilkin in the bg doing radio)

23 October 2020

Time (BST)	Country	Station	Presenter	DJ(s)
18:00	United Kingdom	BBC Radio 1	Annie Mac	Danny Howard
19:00	Netherlands	NPO 3FM	Sander Hoogendoorn	Yellow Claw
20:00	Sweden	SR P3	Samir Yosufi	Rebecca & Fiona
21:00	Germany	1LIVE	Jan-Christian Zeller	Claptone
21:30	Germany	Fritz	Bruno Dietel	Prismode & Solvane
22:00	Belgium	Studio Brussel	Jeroen Delodder	Joyhauser & Klaps and Lola Haro
23:00	Ireland	RTÉ 2FM	Jenny Greene	Brame & Hamo
00:00	Finland	YleX	DJ Orion	Yotto
01:00	Norway	NRK mP3	Abiel Tesfai	Alan Walker

== See also ==
- Europe's Biggest Dance Show
