= Europe's Biggest Dance Show =

European annual dance music programme

- Genre: Dance
- Running time: 420 minutes (2019–May 2020); 480 minutes (October 2020); 270 minutes (2021); 330 minutes (2022–2024); 360 minutes (2025–present)
- Country of origin: Various countries
- Language: primarily English
- Home station: BBC Radio 1 (2019–present); BBC Radio 1 Dance (2020–present)
- Syndicates: Various broadcasters
- Produced by: Dan Morris
- Original release: 11 October 2019 – present
- No. of episodes: 9 editions
- Audio format: Stereophonic sound
- Website: BBC Radio 1; EBU

Europe's Biggest Dance Show is an annual multinational dance music simulcast hosted by BBC Radio 1 in the United Kingdom, in collaboration with several European radio stations, all of which are owned by public broadcasters which are members of the European Broadcasting Union. The show reaches several millions of listeners all over Europe.

== Background and history ==
The British Broadcasting Corporation (BBC) announced on 27 September 2019 that it would join radio stations from seven other countries, and a potential audience of 18 million listeners, in hosting a one-off dance music simulcast on 11 October.

The first simulcast began at 19:00 BST and ended at 02:00 BST on 12 October, with Annie Mac introducing for BBC Radio 1 in London. Seven radio stations across Europe joined the simulcast: 1LIVE, Fritz, Mouv', NPO 3FM, RTÉ 2FM, SR P3 and Studio Brussel. Each radio station contributed an hour of dance music from their respective countries, except in the case of 1LIVE and Fritz, who contributed 30 minutes each from Cologne and Berlin respectively. Some stations chose to feature at least one live DJ set as part of their contribution.

Dan Morris
(@DanDJMorris)
tweeted:

Replying to @FutureHouseSelf @ahj

Lots of lines! Each participating station linked to us, we’ll mix the programme and then send the whole show back to participating stations. 🤓

11 October 2019

Each radio station sent their feeds to Broadcasting House in London, where they were mixed by BBC senior technical producer Dan Morris before being sent back to the radio stations for broadcast.

Despite the simulcast being billed as a one-off event, two subsequent editions of the simulcast were presented in May and October 2020 respectively, before it became an annual event, with new editions presented in the following years and more radio stations joining the simulcast. Since the 2021 edition, each participating radio station, including 1LIVE and Fritz, has contributed 30 minutes of dance music from their respective countries instead of an hour.

In March 2024, BBC Radio 1 launched a spin-off event called Europe's Biggest Soundsystem Party alongside partner stations 1LIVE and Mouv'; this was followed in February 2025 by Europe's Biggest Gig, with contributions from RTÉ 2FM, Studio Brussel, 1LIVE and, for the first time, Rás 2.

== Participating broadcasters ==
The following table lists the countries, broadcasters and radio stations that have participated in Europe's Biggest Dance Show as of 2026.

Table key
†	Inactive – countries which participated in the past but did not participate in further editions as of 2026

Country	Broadcaster(s)	Station(s)	City	Debut year	Latest participation	Appearances
Austria	ORF	FM4	Vienna	2021 (Note: Although it did not participate in the October 2020 edition, FM4 broadcast the show as part of its weekly dance music show La boum de luxe.)	2026	6
Belgium	VRT	Studio Brussel	Brussels	2019	2026	9
Estonia	ERR	Raadio 2	Tallinn	2023	2026	4
Finland	Yle	YleX	Helsinki	2020 (October)	2026	7
France †	Radio France	Mouv'	Paris	2019	2020 (May)	2
Germany	WDR (ARD)	1LIVE	Cologne	2019	2026	9
Germany	RBB (ARD)	Fritz	Berlin	2019	2026	9
Ireland	RTÉ	RTÉ 2FM	Dublin	2019	2026	7
Ireland	RTÉ	RTÉ Pulse (Note: The 2024 edition was simulcast on RTÉ 2FM's sister station, RTÉ Pulse, due to coverage of Culture Night on RTÉ 2FM. However, on-air imaging still referred to the Irish participation as being from RTÉ 2FM.)	Dublin	2024		1
Netherlands	NPO	NPO 3FM	Amsterdam	2019	2026	6
Norway	NRK	NRK mP3	Oslo	2020 (October)	2026	7
Spain †	Catalunya Ràdio	iCat	Barcelona	2023		1
Sweden	SR	SR P3	Stockholm	2019	2026	9
Ukraine	Suspilne	Radio Promin	Kyiv	2022	2026	5
United Kingdom	BBC	BBC Radio 1 (Note: Since the October 2020 edition, the show is simulcast on BBC Radio 1 and its sister station, Radio 1 Dance.)	London	2019	2026	9

== Editions ==
The following table lists the editions of Europe's Biggest Dance Show.

Table key
Yes	Participant
Yes (Debut)	Debuting participant(s)
No	Non-participant

Year	Date(s)	Participants	Participating countries														Ref.
Year	Date(s)	Participants	(Austria)	(Belgium)	(Estonia)	(Finland)	(France)	(Germany) (1LIVE)	(Germany) (Fritz)	(Republic of Ireland)	(Netherlands)	(Norway)	(Spain)	(Sweden)	(Ukraine)	(United Kingdom)	Ref.
2019	11–12 October	8	No	Yes (Debut)	No	No	Yes (Debut)	Yes (Debut)	Yes (Debut)	Yes (Debut)	Yes (Debut)	No	No	Yes (Debut)	No	Yes (Debut)	
2020	8–9 May	8	No	Yes	No	No	Yes	Yes	Yes	Yes	Yes	No	No	Yes	No	Yes	
2020	23–24 October	9	No	Yes	No	Yes (Debut)	No	Yes	Yes	Yes	Yes	Yes (Debut)	No	Yes	No	Yes	
2021	29 October	9	Yes (Debut)	Yes	No	Yes	No	Yes	Yes	Yes	No	Yes	No	Yes	No	Yes	
2022	14 October	11	Yes	Yes	No	Yes	No	Yes	Yes	Yes	Yes	Yes	No	Yes	Yes (Debut)	Yes	
2023	22 September	11	Yes	Yes	Yes (Debut)	Yes	No	Yes	Yes	No	No	Yes	Yes (Debut)	Yes	Yes	Yes	
2024	20 September	11	Yes	Yes	Yes	Yes	No	Yes	Yes	Yes	No	Yes	No	Yes	Yes	Yes	
2025	26 September	12	Yes	Yes	Yes	Yes	No	Yes	Yes	Yes	Yes	Yes	No	Yes	Yes	Yes	
2026	25 September	12	Yes	Yes	Yes	Yes	No	Yes	Yes	Yes	Yes	Yes	No	Yes	Yes	Yes	
