= The Original =

The Original(s) may refer to:

== Books and publishing ==
- The Original, a literary periodical founded in 1829 by Frances Harriet Whipple Green McDougall
- The Original, a humorous weekly periodical founded in 1823 by William John Thoms
- The Original Magazine, arts and culture magazine in Pittsburgh
- The Originals (comics), a 2004 graphic novel by Dave Gibbons

== Film and television ==
- The Originals (film), a 2017 Egyptian film
- The Originals (TV series), an American TV series aired on The CW (2013-2018)
- "The Originals" (The Vampire Diaries episode), an episode
- The Originals (The Vampire Diaries characters), a fictional family from The Vampire Diaries universe
- "The Original" (Westworld), an episode

== Music ==
- The Originals (group), a Detroit-based soul group, backing singers to Marvin Gaye
- Rosie and the Originals
- The Original (group), a dance music group known for their 1994 single "I Luv U Baby"

=== Albums ===
- The Original (album), a 2003 album by Sarai
- The Original, a 1992 album by Burning Spear
- The Original, a 2012 album by Remady & Manu-L
- The Originals (Kiss album), 1976
- The Originals (The Statler Brothers album), 1979

== Other uses ==
- The Original All Blacks, a New Zealand rugby team
- The Original Dinerant, Portland, Oregon, U.S.
- The Originals (website), a book series and now website about every possible song or musical composition and its covers

== See also ==
- Origin (disambiguation)
- Original (disambiguation)
