= Point of origin =

Point of origin may refer to:

- Point of Origin (film), a 2002 biographical crime film
- Point of Origin (novel), a crime fiction novel by Patricia Cornwell
- "Point of Origin", an episode of season 5 of the US medical drama ER
- "Point of Origin" (The Inside episode)
- Point of Origin (There for Tomorrow album), 2004
- Point of Origin (Person of Interest), 2014
- "Point of Origin" (The Twilight Zone), 2019 episode of the television series The Twilight Zone
- Coordinate origin for a coordinate system

== See also ==
- Points of Origin, 2025 album by Will Stratton
- Origin (disambiguation)
