= Original (disambiguation) =

Originality is the quality of novelty or newness in created works.

Original(s) or Originality may also refer to:

== Film and television ==
- Original programming, a media term
- Original (film), a 2009 Danish/Swedish film
- Original Film, an American film production company
- Original Productions, an American television production company

== Music ==
- Original P, a funk band

=== Albums ===
- Original, a 2004 album by Ella Koon
- Originals (Kurupt album), a compilation album by Kurupt
- Originals (Prince album), a compilation album by Prince

=== Songs ===
- "Original" (Leftfield song), 1995
- "Original" (Cir.Cuz song), a 2015 song by Norwegian duo Cir.Cuz featuring Emilia
- "D. Original", a 1994 song by Jeru the Damaja

== People ==
- Original Peart (before 1612 – 1657), Mayor of Lincoln (1650–1651) and MP for Lincoln (1654 and 1656).

== Other uses ==
- Original (catamaran) (19th century), a catamaran built by Englishman Mayflower Crisp in Rangoon, Burma
- Originality (album)
- Original Software, a UK software-testing products and services company
- Originals: How Non-Conformists Move the World, a 2017 book by American psychologist Adam Grant

== See also ==
- Origin (disambiguation)
- The Original (disambiguation)
