= Origins (comics) =

Origins or origin, in comics, may refer to:

- Origin story, in comic books, describing how a character gained their special abilities and/or how they became a superhero or supervillain
- "Origins" (Judge Dredd story), a Judge Dredd storyline from 2000 AD
- Origin (comics), a Wolverine comic book limited series published by Marvel Comics in 2002
- The Origin (Buffy comic), a Dark Horse Comics mini-series retelling Buffy's origins as shown in the original film

It may also refer to:

- "Origins & Omens", a DC Comics back-up story in Green Lantern
- Secret Origins, a DC Comics comic book series that told the origins of various characters
- Spider-Woman: Origin, a Marvel Comics series, a reboot of Marvel Spotlight #32
- Ultimate Origins, an Ultimate Marvel limited series telling the story of the birth of the fictional universe
- Wolverine: Origins, a Marvel Comics series, the sequel to Origin

== See also ==
- Origin (disambiguation)
