= Europe's Biggest Dance Show 2019 =

International radio special

- BBC Radio 1's logo for the show
- Genre: Dance
- Running time: 420 minutes (7:00 pm – 2:00 am)
- Country of origin: Belgium; France; Germany; Ireland; Netherlands; Sweden; United Kingdom
- Language(s): primarily English
- Home station: BBC Radio 1
- Syndicates: 1LIVE; Fritz; Mouv'; NPO 3FM; RTÉ 2fm SR P3; Studio Brussel
- Produced by: Dan Morris
- Executive producer(s): Aled Haydn-Jones
- Original release: 11 October – 12 October 2019
- Audio format: Stereophonic sound
- Website: BBC Radio 1

Europe's Biggest Dance Show 2019 was the first edition of Europe's Biggest Dance Show, a multinational dance music simulcast presented by Euroradio and hosted by BBC Radio 1, in collaboration with seven other radio stations from across Europe: 1LIVE, Fritz, Mouv', NPO 3FM, RTÉ 2FM, SR P3 and Studio Brussel.

== Background ==
The British Broadcasting Corporation (BBC) announced on 27 September 2019 that it would join radio stations from seven other countries, and a potential audience of 18 million listeners, in hosting a one-off dance music simulcast on 11 October.

The simulcast started at 19:00 BST and finished at 02:00 BST on 12 October, with Annie Mac introducing for BBC Radio 1 in London. Each radio station contributed an hour of dance music from their respective country, except in the case of 1LIVE and Fritz, who broadcast 30 minutes each from Cologne and Berlin respectively. Some stations chose to feature at least one live DJ set as part of their contribution e.g., Jax Jones for BBC Radio 1.

Each radio station sent their feeds to Broadcasting House in London, where they were mixed by BBC senior technical producer Dan Morris before being sent back to the radio stations for broadcast.

Dan Morris
@DanDJMorris

Replying to @FutureHouseSelf @ahj

Lots of lines! Each participating station linked to us, we’ll mix the programme and then send the whole show back to participating stations. 🤓

11 October 2019

The show's imaging was based around a sample from "San Frandisco" by Dom Dolla.

Despite the simulcast being billed as a one-off event, two subsequent editions of the simulcast were broadcast in May and October 2020 respectively.

== Running order ==
| Time (BST) | Country | Station | Presenter | DJ(s) |
|---|---|---|---|---|
| 19:00 | United Kingdom | BBC Radio 1 | Annie Mac | Jax Jones |
| 20:00 | Sweden | SR P3 | Samir Yosufi | Rebecca & Fiona |
| 21:00 | Germany | 1LIVE | Jan-Christian Zeller | Robin Schulz |
| 21:30 | Germany | Fritz | Bruno Dietel | Lovra |
| 22:00 | Belgium | Studio Brussel | Jeroen Delodder | Charlotte de Witte, DJ Licious and Amelie Lens |
| 23:00 | Ireland | RTÉ 2FM | Jenny Greene | George Feely and Sunil Sharpe |
| 00:00 | France | Mouv' | Géraldine Mac Carron | Ayane |
| 01:00 | Netherlands | NPO 3FM | Yoeri Leeflang | Mike Mago |

== See also ==
- Europe's Biggest Dance Show
