= Atharva =

Ahtarva or Atharvaa may refer to:

== Titled works ==
- Atharva (2018 film), Indian Kannada-language action drama film
- Atharva (2023 film), Indian Telugu-language crime thriller film
- Atharva – The Origin, 2022 graphic novel by Ramesh Thamilmani

== People ==
- Atharva Ankolekar (born 2000), Indian cricketer
- Atharvaa (Atharvaa Murali), Indian actor
- Atharva Sudame (born 1998), Indian comedian
- Atharva Taide (born 2000), Indian cricketer

== See also ==
- Atharvaveda, a knowledge storehouse
- Atharvashiras Upanishad, Sanskrit text
