= No Wonder =

Studio album by Will Stratton
- Released: November 3, 2009
- Recorded: Astoria, Queens
- Genre: Indie folk
- Length: 50:57
- Label: Stunning Models On Display
- Producers: Will Stratton, Kieran Kelly

Will Stratton chronology
| What the Night Said (2007) | No Wonder (2009) |

No Wonder is the second studio album from Will Stratton.

== Critical reception ==
Professional ratings
Review scores
| Source | Rating |
|---|---|
| PopMatters | 8/10 |
| American Songwriter | 2.5/5 stars |
| Cokemachineglow | 76% |

The album received generally favorable reviews. PopMatters cited a further advancement in writing and composition as "stronger, meatier, and much braver" than What the Night Said, but noted that some of the forays into pop-rock territory (specifically "Nineteen" and "It's OK If You Want To") were distracting from the overall flow of the record.

== Track listing ==
1. "Who Will" - 3:00
2. "For Franny Glass" – 3:01
3. "The Country Clear" – 3:17
4. "The Past Always Runs Faster" – 3:25
5. "Robin and Marian" – 6:07
6. "For No One" – 2:58
7. "Nineteen" – 4:05
8. "Your California Sky" – 2:42
9. "You're a Real Thing" – 3:13
10. "No Wonder" – 3:56
11. "It's Ok If You Want To" – 4:48
12. "If Only" – 2:05
13. "Judas, 1966" - 4:16
14. "New Jersey" - 4:04

== Song notes ==
- The title track of this album was NPR's song of the day on March 26, 2010.
