= The Originals (website) =

- Company type: Nonprofit
- Headquarters: Reet, Belgium
- Creator: Arnold Rypens
- Registration: 2000
- Launched: 2000
- Current status: perpetual work-in-progress

The Originals is a database website founded and run by Arnold Rypens in 2000 and based on a radio show and book series originally launched in 1982. It offers lists of the original versions of thousands of songs and musical compositions and adds every cover and sample made of it since. As of 2017 the site counts more than 15.000 titles.

== Concept ==
The Originals was established to track down the original version of every possible song, melody, composition or sample. In many cases the tune listeners would recognize as "the original version" turns out to be much older and far more obscure. Visitors can use a search engine to type in the name of a musical work or artist and find the corresponding article. Articles about artists or bands provide a list of all of their songs which are covers and/or songs which have been covered. Articles about songs or melodies list all possible musical covers and versions. In both cases the names of each artist, composer, band, songwriter and year of recording are listed. Whenever possible, historical context and background is provided as well. The info is made available both in Dutch as well as English.

== History ==
The project is the brainchild of Flemish radio host Arnold Rypens (1952) who established a radio show, Domino The Originals in February 1982 aired on Omroep Brabant (nowadays Radio 2). It aired nothing but original versions of hits of the day. The emissions sparked interest from listeners who were often surprised and intrigued how old certain songs were and how they sounded in their earliest embryonic versions. As such the show kept running and spawned a special book named The Originals - Prequel of the Hits (1987) by Arnold Rypens. This first edition listed some 12.000 music titles, tracing back their earliest versions predating hit version(s) and other relevant covers. Since then up to five new book editions have been published, completely updated and expanded. In 2010 an English version has been published as well.

Rypens travelled the entire world, researched various libraries, audio collection, museums, archives of country, blues and soul and interviewed collectors and archivists like Joel Whitburn and Alan Lomax. Rypens' radio show has been broadcast on Omroep West-Vlaanderen, Studio Brussel and the regional channel Radio L1. To this day Rypens still has a daily segment in the radio program Pili Pili where he talks about one particular song whose origins he has discovered and mapped out. The show was also broadcast on Radio 3 in the Netherlands by Dutch host Hubert van Hoof. In 2000 Rypens established a website around the project.
