= Will Stratton =

American singer-songwriter and composer (born 1987)

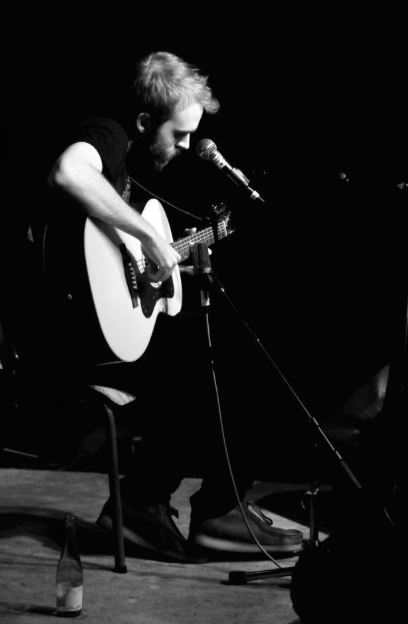
- Will Stratton playing in Antwerp, Belgium, 2012

Background information
- Born: April 10, 1987 (age 38); Yolo County, California, United States
- Genres: Indie folk, folk rock
- Occupation(s): Musician, songwriter, composer
- Instrument(s): Voice, guitar, banjo, piano, harpsichord, Mellotron, bass
- Years active: 2007–present
- Labels: Bella Union, Talitres, Tompkins Square Records
- Website: willstratton.com

Will Stratton (born April 10, 1987) is an American singer-songwriter and composer. He released his first album during the summer after graduating from high school and has so far released eight full solo albums and two EPs. He is currently signed to Bella Union.

== Early life ==
Stratton was born in Northern California, but raised primarily in New Jersey. He began taking piano lessons at the age of four. He spent one year at University of Puget Sound studying philosophy, before finishing college at Bennington College, where he switched his studies to music composition. While at Bennington, Stratton took classes from composer Allen Shawn, which led him to compose his first pieces for other ensembles than a standard string quartet. Stratton has incorporated projects from his course work at Bennington into his albums, including a set of ten piano preludes composed for a second course taught by Shawn. He lives in New York state.

== Musical career ==
His first album, What the Night Said, was recorded in 2005, the summer after he graduated from high school, and was subsequently released in 2007. It featured a guest appearance by Sufjan Stevens on oboe, and received wide critical praise.

His second album, No Wonder, featured the vocal work of Essie Jain, among others, and was released on November 3, 2009. The album was co-produced and mixed by Kieran Kelly at The Buddy Project Studio in Astoria, Queens NY. While the album never saw national distribution, No Wonder's title track was the NPR Song of the Day on March 26, 2010.

He has also released two free download-only compilations of demos and instrumental works, as well as Vile Bodies, a free downloadable EP.

In March 2010, Stratton appeared on WNYC radio show Spinning on Air for an hour-long interview and performance with host David Garland. In a first for the show, Stratton and WNYC gave away the songs from the episode as a free EP.

In 2010 and 2012, his third and fourth albums were released, titled New Vanguard Blues and Post-Empire, respectively. He toured Europe for two months with fellow songwriter Paleo, aka David Strackany, in 2012. Post-Empire was named No. 31 on AOL Spinner's top 50 albums of 2012.

In 2012, Stratton was diagnosed with Stage 3 testicular cancer and underwent successful chemotherapy treatment and surgery.

In 2017, Bella Union announced that Stratton's sixth album, Rosewood Almanac, was to be released on the label on May 12.

In 2021, Bella Union announced that Stratton's seventh album The Changing Wilderness would be released on the label on May 7. The album was named one of The Guardian's best of 2021. On July 30, Stratton was a guest on Elton John's Apple Music Radio 1 show, Elton John's Rocket Hour.

In 2025, Stratton released his eighth studio album, Points of Origin.

== Influences ==
Stratton is a "self professed disciple of Nick Drake." He has also been described as functioning "under the wing of Sufjan Stevens." Some have gone as far as to say that the resemblance to Drake is "unmistakable" at points, while his similarity to Stevens is "so apparent." John Fahey and Leo Kottke are often mentioned as influences on his guitar style.

== Discography ==
=== Demos ===
- For No One (2007)
- Instrumental Music, 2007–2009 (2009)

=== Studio albums ===
- What the Night Said (2007)
- No Wonder (2009)
- New Vanguard Blues (2010)
- Post-Empire (2012)
- Gray Lodge Wisdom (2014)
- Rosewood Almanac (2017)
- The Changing Wilderness (2021)
- Points of Origin (2025)

=== EPs ===
- Vile Bodies (2009)
- Two Songs (2015)
