= The Man Ezeke =

Jamaican radio presenter (died 2022)

Ezekiel Gray, known as The Man Ezeke, was a Jamaican radio presenter and musician. He was born in Montego Bay, Jamaica.

Gray began his career at ERI, a pirate radio station, in the 1980s. He subsequently presented the Jammin' Oldies Saturday night show on Cork's 96FM. He began broadcasting in the UK originally on BBC Radio Bedfordshire. In October 1990, he began presenting a reggae show called The Sunshine Show on BBC Radio 1 on Wednesday nights. On 3 January 1993, Gray took over the Sunday lunchtime slot previously presented by Alan Freeman. He was the first black presenter with a regular daytime slot on the station.

Gray died in Jamaica in March 2022. He had a wife and two children.
