= Origen (disambiguation) =

Origen was a third-century Christian theologian.

Origen may also refer to:

- Origen the Pagan, a third-century Platonist philosopher
- Origen (band), a pop/rock band in Miami, Florida
- Origen (esports), a European esports team

== See also ==
- Pseudo-Origen
- Orijen, a brand of dog food and cat food manufactured in Alberta, Canada
- Origin (disambiguation)
