= What the Night Said =

Studio album by Will Stratton
- Released: May 1, 2007
- Recorded: Astoria, Queens 2005
- Genre: Indie folk
- Length: 33:28
- Label: Stunning Models on Display
- Producer: Will Stratton, Kieran Kelly

Will Stratton chronology
What the Night Said (2007)	No Wonder (2009)

Professional ratings
Review scores
Source	Rating
Allmusic	4.5/5 stars
PopMatters	9/10

What the Night Said is the debut album from Will Stratton. It was recorded the summer after his senior year of high school in a small recording studio in Astoria, Queens, New York, but not released until two years later.

== Critical reception ==
The reception to the album was highly favorable. Allmusic has said that "Even though his songs seem to come from a nearly monkish vantage point of isolation, there is lifting beauty here, a need for connection, and breathtaking flights, swoops, and turns of melody." Evan Sawdey, for PopMatters, opined that Stratton, "ma[de] an album of songs that were custom-fitted for listening to at night," and that ultimately, "Stratton succeeds, and beautifully so."

== Track listing ==
1. "Katydid" - 2:33
2. "So Ashamed" – 3:02
3. "Fireflies" – 2:48
4. "Night Will Come" – 3:45
5. "Lost the Fear" – 2:52
6. "I'd Hate to Leave You" – 2:58
7. "Sonnet" – 2:20
8. "Oh Quiet Night" – 2:19
9. "Sleepwalk" – 1:59
10. "Stay Awake" – 2:56
11. "Sunol" – 2:53
12. "I Don't Wanna Love" – 3:07

== Personnel ==
- Will Stratton – vocals, acoustic guitar, electric guitar, banjo, piano, harpsichord, Mellotron, synthesizer, bass guitar, hand claps
- Sufjan Stevens – oboe
- Tony Rogers – violin, cello
- Sam Deutsch – violin
- Michael Trepagnier – hand claps
- Kieran Kelly – drums
