= Europe's Biggest Dance Show 2021 =

International radio special

- Genre: Dance
- Running time: 270 minutes (6:30 pm – 11:00 pm)
- Country of origin: Austria; Belgium; Finland; Germany; Ireland; Norway; Sweden; United Kingdom
- Language(s): primarily English
- Home station: BBC Radio 1
- Syndicates: 1LIVE; FM4; Fritz; NRK mP3; RTÉ 2FM; Studio Brussel; SR P3; YleX
- Original release: 29 October – 29 October 2021
- Audio format: Stereophonic sound
- Website: Europe's Biggest Dance Show

Europe's Biggest Dance Show 2021 was the fourth iteration of Europe's Biggest Dance Show, a multi-nation dance music simulcast hosted by BBC Radio 1, in collaboration with eight other radio stations from across Europe: 1LIVE, Fritz, NRK mP3, RTÉ 2FM, Studio Brussel, SR P3, YleX, and for the first time, FM4.

== Background ==
The simulcast started at 18:30 BST on 29 October 2021, but unlike in previous years, where every radio station contributed an hour, every radio station contributed 30 minutes of dance music from their respective country.

After broadcasting the October 2020 edition of the simulcast as part of its weekly dance music show La boum de luxe, Austria’s FM4 contributed for the first time.

== Running order ==
| Time (BST) | Country of origin | Radio station | DJ | Presenter |
|---|---|---|---|---|
| 18:30 | United Kingdom | BBC Radio 1 | Sam Divine | Danny Howard |
| 19:00 | Sweden | SR P3 | Samir Yosufi | |
| 19:30 | Germany | 1LIVE | Felix Jaehn | Jan-Christian Zeller |
| 20:00 | Germany | Fritz | Ben Böhmer | Bruno Dietel |
| 20:30 | Belgium | Studio Brussel | Amelie Lens | Bert Van Steenberghe |
| 21:00 | Ireland | RTÉ 2FM | Jenny Greene | |
| 21:30 | Austria | FM4 | Camo & Krooked | DJ Functionist |
| 22:00 | Norway | NRK mP3 | Tungevaag | Abiel Tee |
| 22:30 | Finland | YleX | DJ Orion | |

== See also ==
- Europe's Biggest Dance Show
