= BBC Radio 1 =

British national radio station

- Logo used since 2021
- London, Salford and Birmingham; United Kingdom
- Frequencies: FM: 97.1 MHz–99.7 MHz; DAB: 12B (BBC National DAB); Freesat: 700; Freeview: 700; Sky (UK only): 0101; Virgin Media: 901; Virgin Media Ireland: 907; Astra 2E (28.2°E); Intelsat 901 (18°W)
- RDS: BBC R1

Programming
- Language: English
- Format: Contemporary hit radio, with specialist programming at night

Ownership
- Owner: BBC
- Sister stations: BBC Radio 1 Anthems; BBC Radio 1 Dance; BBC Radio 1Xtra

History
- First air date: 30 September 1967; 59 years ago (as BBC Radio 1); 7 January 1940; 86 years ago (as BBC Forces Programme) (Note: Radio 1 was established to replace BBC Light Programme, which itself replaced BBC General Forces Programme. The latter of these first broadcast in 1944. The BBC has had a broadcast since it acquired BBC Forces Programme in 1940.)
- Former call signs: BBC Light Programme
- Former names: BBC Forces Programme (1940-1944); BBC General Forces Programme (1944-1946); BBC Light Programme (1946-1967)
- Former frequencies: FM: 104.8 MHz (London); 96.0 MHz (Belfast); AM: 1053 kHz; 1089 kHz; 1107 kHz; 1485 kHz 1214 kHz

Technical information
- Licensing authority: Ofcom

Links
- Website: BBC Radio 1 via BBC Sounds (UK Only)

BBC Radio 1 is a British national radio station owned and operated by the BBC. It specialises in modern popular music, current chart hits and future hits. It also plays a wide range of genres, including pop, hip-hop, R&B, dance, electronica, rock, indie and alternative music every day. Radio 1's sister stations are Radio 1 Anthems, dedicated to throwback music, Radio 1 Dance, dedicated to dance and electronic music, and Radio 1Xtra, which plays a variety of Black music.

Radio 1 broadcasts throughout the UK on FM between 97.1 MHz and 99.7 MHz, digital radio, digital TV and BBC Sounds. It was launched in 1967 to meet the demand for music generated by pirate radio stations, when the average age of the UK population was 27. The BBC claims that it targets the 15–29 age group, and that the average age of its UK audience since 2009 is 30. BBC Radio 1 started 24-hour broadcasting on 1 May 1991.

According to RAJAR, the station broadcasts to a weekly audience of 7.03 million with a listening share of 4.5% as of May 2026.

== History ==
=== First broadcast ===
Radio 1 was established in 1967 (along with the more middle-of-the-road BBC Radio 2) as a successor to the BBC Light Programme, which had broadcast popular music and other entertainment since 1945. Radio 1 was conceived as a direct response to the popularity of offshore pirate radio stations such as Radio Caroline and Radio London, which had been declared illegal by Act of Parliament. Radio 1's initial format was influenced in particular by Radio London's American-style Top 40 format, in which music was divided into categories played in strict rotation. The new service was initially promoted in the summer of 1967 by trails (voiced by Kenny Everett) which referred to it as "Radio 247", the station's temporary working title.

Radio 1 was launched at 7:00 am on Saturday 30 September 1967.

Broadcasts were on 1214 kHz AM (247 metres), using a network of transmitters which had carried the Light Programme. Most were of comparatively low power, at less than 50 kilowatts, and this resulted in the station only having patchy coverage.

The first disc jockey to broadcast on the new station was Tony Blackburn, who had previously been on Radio Caroline and Radio London, and presented what became known as the Radio 1 Breakfast Show. The first words on Radio 1 – after a countdown by the Controller of Radios 1 and 2, Robin Scott, and a jingle, recorded at PAMS in Dallas, Texas, beginning "The voice of Radio 1" – were:

And, good morning everyone. Welcome to the exciting new sound of Radio 1.

— BBC Radio 1 opening message

This was the first use of US-style jingles on BBC radio, but the style was familiar to listeners who were acquainted with Blackburn and other DJs from their days on pirate radio. The reason jingles from PAMS were used was that the Musicians' Union would not agree to a single fee for the singers and musicians if the jingles were made "in-house" by the BBC; they wanted repeat fees each time one was played.

The first music to be heard on the station was an extract from "Beefeaters" by Johnny Dankworth. "Theme One", specially composed for the launch by George Martin was played for the first time before Radio 1 officially launched at 7 am. The first complete record played on Radio 1 was "Flowers in the Rain" by The Move, the number 2 record in that week's Top 20 (the number 1 record, "The Last Waltz" by Engelbert Humperdinck, would have been inappropriate for the station's sound). The second single was "Massachusetts" by the Bee Gees. The breakfast show remains the most prized slot in the Radio 1 schedule, with every change of breakfast show presenter generating considerable media interest.

The initial rota of staff included John Peel, Pete Myers, and a gaggle of others, some transferred from pirate stations, such as Keith Skues, Ed Stewart, Mike Raven, David Ryder, Jim Fisher, Jimmy Young, Dave Cash, Kenny Everett, Simon Dee, Terry Wogan, Duncan Johnson, Doug Crawford, Tommy Vance, Chris Denning, and Emperor Rosko. Many of the most popular pirate radio voices, such as Simon Dee, had only a one-hour slot per week ("Midday Spin").

=== 1970s ===
Initially, the station was unpopular with some of its target audience who, it is claimed, disliked that much of its airtime was shared with Radio 2 and that it was less unequivocally aimed at a young audience than the offshore stations, with DJs such as Jimmy Young being in their 40s. The fact that it was part of an "establishment" institution such as the BBC turned off some, and needle time restrictions let it play fewer records than the offshore stations. It had limited finances and often, as in January 1975, suffered disproportionately when the BBC made financial cutbacks, strengthening an impression that it was a lower priority for BBC executives.

Despite this, it gained massive audiences, becoming the most listened-to station in the world, with audiences of more than 10 million claimed for some shows (up to 20 million for some of the combined Radio 1 and Radio 2 shows). In the early-to-mid-1970s, Radio 1 presenters were rarely out of the British tabloids, thanks to the publicity department. The touring summer live Radio 1 Roadshow – usually BBC Radio Weeks promotions that took Radio 1, 2 and 4 shows on the road – drew some of the largest crowds of the decade. The station played a role in maintaining the high sales of 45 rpm single records, although it benefited from a lack of competition, apart from Radio Luxembourg, and from Manx Radio in the Isle of Man. (Independent Local Radio did not begin until October 1973, took many years to cover virtually all the UK and was initially a mixture of music and talk). Alan Freeman's Saturday Rock Show was voted Best Radio Show five years running by readers of a national music publication, and was then axed by controller Derek Chinnery.

News coverage was boosted in 1973 when Newsbeat bulletins aired for the first time, and Richard Skinner joined as one of the new programme's presenters.

On air, 1978 was the busiest year of the decade. David Jensen replaced Dave Lee Travis on the weekday drivetime programme so that DLT could replace Noel Edmonds on the Radio 1 Breakfast show. Later in the year the Sunday teatime chart show extended from a Top 20 to a Top 40 countdown, and Tommy Vance, one of the original presenters, rejoined the station to present a new programme, The Friday Rock Show. On 23 November, Radio 1 moved from 247m (1214 kHz) to 275 and 285m (1089 and 1053 kHz) to improve national AM reception, and to conform with the Geneva Frequency Plan of 1975.

Annie Nightingale, whose first Radio 1 programme aired on 5 October 1969, was Britain's first national female DJ (the earliest record presenter is thought to be Jean Metcalfe of Family Favourites, but given that Metcalfe only presented the programme she is not considered a "true" DJ) and became its longest-serving presenter, evolving her musical tastes with the times.

In 1978, Al Matthews became the first black disc jockey on Radio 1. His Saturday night show Discovatin' was broadcast for over two years. During the summer a Wednesday show was also broadcast featuring live acts.

=== 1980s ===
At the start of 1981, Mike Read took over The Radio 1 Breakfast Show from Dave Lee Travis. Towards the end of the year, Steve Wright started the long-running Steve Wright in the Afternoon show. 1982 saw the end of Junior Choice and it was replaced by Radio 1's Weekend Breakfast Show, although the format based on children's requests continued for another two years. Adrian John and Pat Sharp also joined for the early weekend shows. Gary Davies and Janice Long also joined, hosting Saturday night late and evening shows respectively.

In 1984, Robbie Vincent joined to host a Sunday evening soul show. Mike Smith left for a while to present BBC1's Breakfast Time; Gary Davies took over the weekday lunchtime slot. Bruno Brookes joined and replaced Peter Powell as presenter of the teatime show, with Powell replacing Tony Blackburn on a new weekend breakfast show, which no longer contained children's requests. Blackburn left Radio 1 at this point.

In 1985, Radio 1 relocated its studios in Broadcasting House to Egton House. In March 1985, Ranking Miss P became the first black female DJ on the station, hosting a reggae programme. In July, Andy Kershaw joined the station.

Simon Mayo joined in 1986, while Smith re-joined to replace Read on the breakfast show.

In response to the growth in dance and rap music, Jeff Young joined in October 1987 with the Big Beat show. At the end of the year Nicky Campbell, Mark Goodier and Liz Kershaw all joined, and Janice Long left.

Mayo replaced Smith on the breakfast show in May 1988. In September, Goodier and Kershaw took over weekend breakfasts with Powell departing. Campbell took over weekday evenings as part of a move into night-time broadcasting as 1 October 1988 saw Radio 1 extend broadcast hours until 02:00; previously the station had closed for the night at midnight.

From September 1988, Radio 1 began its FM switch-on, with further major transmitter switch-ons in 1989 and 1990 but it was not until the mid-1990s that all existing BBC radio transmitters had Radio 1 added. Previously, Radio 1 had "borrowed" Radio 2's VHF/FM frequencies for around 25 hours each week.

=== 1990s ===
On 1 May 1991, Radio 1 began 24-hour broadcasting, although only on FM, as the station's MW transmitters were switched off between midnight and 06:00.

In 1992, Radio 1, for the first and only time, covered a general election. Their coverage was presented by Nicky Campbell.

In his last few months as controller, Johnny Beerling commissioned a handful of new shows that in some ways set the tone for what was to come under Matthew Bannister. One of these, loud&proud, was the UK's first national radio series aimed at a gay audience, which was produced in Manchester and aired from August 1993. Far from being a "parting quirk", the show was a surprise hit and led to the network's first coverage of the large outdoor Gay Pride event in 1994.

The Man Ezeke became Radio 1's first black regular daytime presenter when he began hosting on Sunday lunchtimes in January 1993.

Bannister took the reins fully in October 1993. His aim was to rid the station of its "Smashie and Nicey" image in order to appeal to the under-25s. Although originally launched as a youth station, by the early 1990s, its loyal listeners and DJs had aged with the station over its 25-year history. Many long-standing DJs, such as Simon Bates, Dave Lee Travis, Alan Freeman, Bob Harris, Paul Gambaccini, Gary Davies, and later Steve Wright, Bruno Brookes and Johnnie Walker left the station or were dismissed, and in January 1995, older music (typically anything recorded before 1990) was dropped from the daytime playlist.

Many listeners rebelled as the first new DJs to be introduced represented a crossover from other parts of the BBC (notably Bannister and Trevor Dann's former colleagues at the BBC's London station, GLR) with Emma Freud and Danny Baker. Another problem was that, at the time, Radio 2 was sticking resolutely to a format which appealed mainly to those who had been listening since the days of the Light Programme, and commercial radio, which was targeting the "Radio 1 and a half" audience, consequently enjoyed a massive increase in its audience share at Radio 1's expense.

After the departure of Steve Wright, who had been unsuccessfully moved from his long-running afternoon show to the breakfast show in January 1994, Bannister hired Chris Evans to present the breakfast show in April 1995. Evans was a popular presenter but was dismissed in 1997 after he demanded to present the breakfast show for only four days per week. Evans was replaced from 17 February 1997 by Mark and Lard – Mark Radcliffe and his sidekick Marc Riley – who found the slick, mass-audience style required for a breakfast show did not come naturally to them. They were replaced by Zoe Ball and Kevin Greening eight months later in October 1997; Greening soon moved on, leaving Ball as sole presenter. The reinvention of the station happened at a fortuitous time, with the rise of Britpop in the mid-1990s – bands like Oasis, Blur and Pulp were popular and credible at the time, and the station's popularity rose with them. Documentaries like John Peel's Lost in Music, which looked at the influence that the use of drugs have had over popular musicians, received critical acclaim but were slated inside Broadcasting House.

At just before 09:00 on 1 July 1994, Radio 1 broadcast on medium wave for the final time.

In March 1995, Radio 1 hosted an "Interactive Radio Night" with Jo Whiley and Steve Lamacq broadcasting from Cyberia, an internet café and featuring live performances by Orbital via ISDN.

Later in the 1990s the Britpop boom declined, and manufactured chart pop (boy bands and acts aimed at sub-teenagers) came to dominate the charts. New-genre music occupied the evenings (indie on weekdays and dance at weekends), with a mix of specialist shows and playlist fillers through late nights. The rise of rave culture through the late 1980s and early 1990s gave the station the opportunity to move into a controversial and youth-orientated movement by bringing in club DJ Pete Tong amongst others. There had been a dance music programme on Radio 1 since 1987 and Pete Tong (now the current longest-serving DJ at the station) was the second DJ to present an all dance music show. This quickly gave birth to the Essential Mix where underground DJs mix electronic and club based music in a two-hour slot. Dance and urban music has been a permanent feature on Radio 1 since with club DJs such as Judge Jules, Danny Rampling, Trevor Nelson, and the Dreem Teem all moving from London's Kiss 100 to the station.

=== 2000s ===
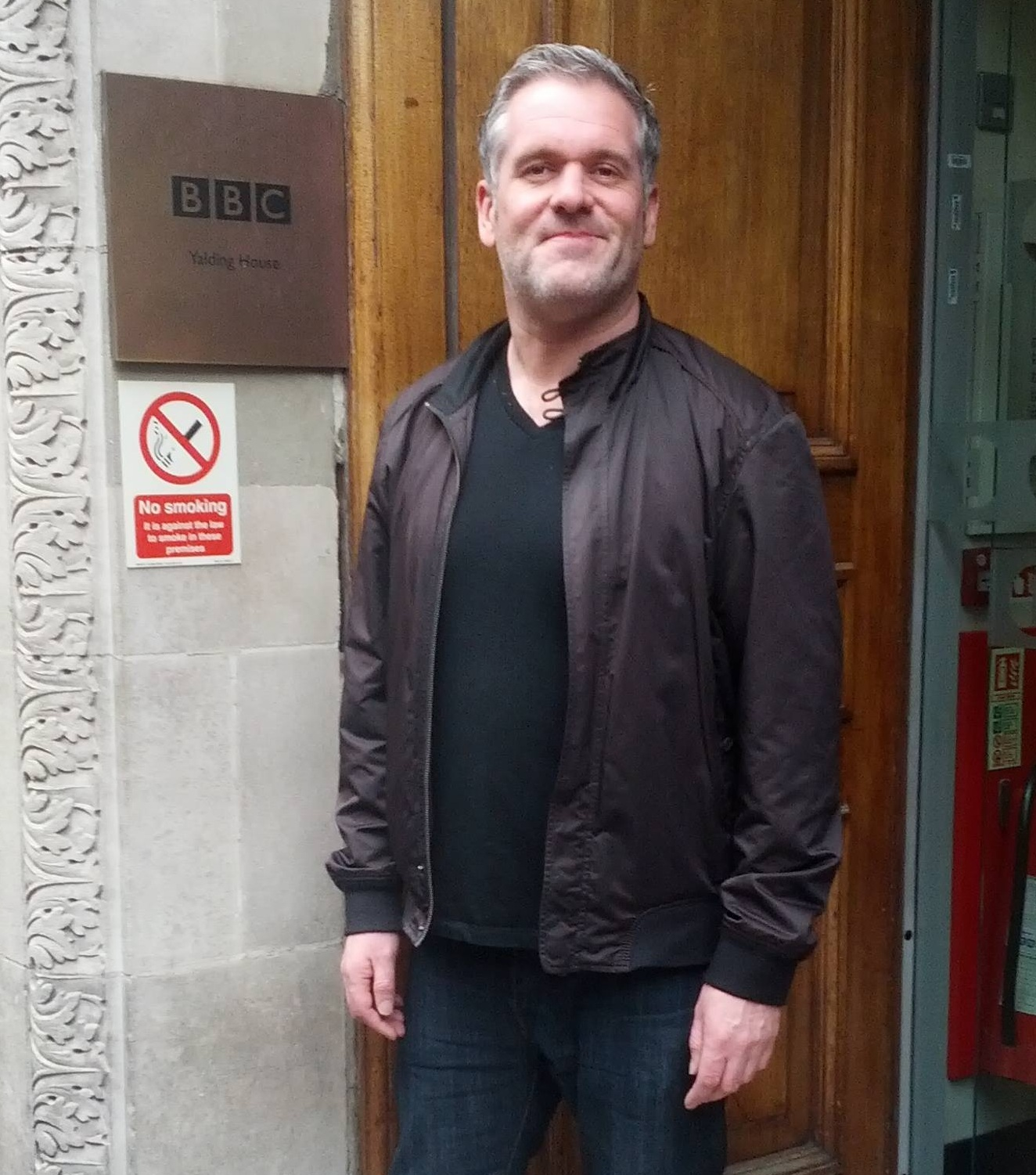
Chris Moyles outside Radio 1's radio studios

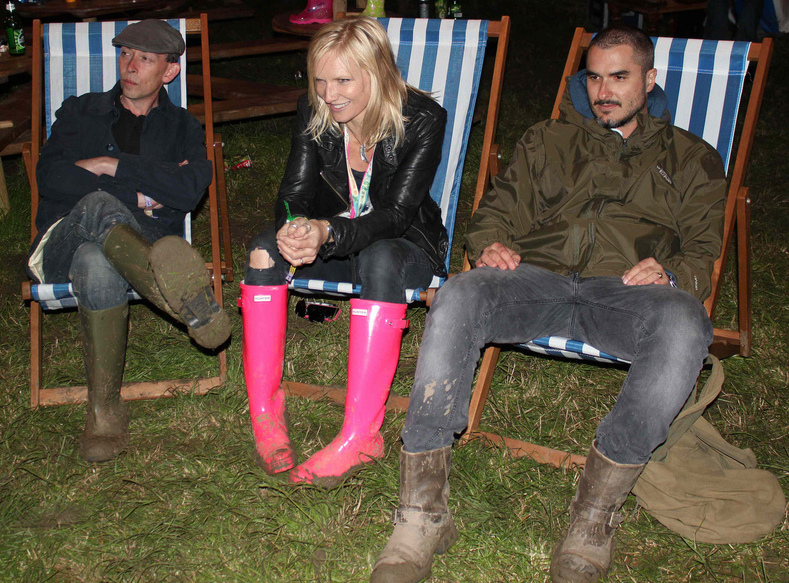
Steve Lamacq, Jo Whiley and Zane Lowe at Glastonbury as part of Radio 1's coverage

Listening numbers continued to decline. Radio 1 was challenged by an increasing number of new radio stations targeting youth such as Galaxy, Kerrang! 105.2, NME Radio and Virgin Radio Xtreme, as well as BBC's own digital TV station BBC Three.

The breakfast show and the UK Top 40 continued to struggle. In 2000, Zoe Ball was replaced in the mornings by close friend and fellow ladette Sara Cox.

The success of Moyles' show has come alongside increased success for the station in general. In 2006, DJs Scott Mills and Zane Lowe won gold Sony Radio Awards, while the station itself came away with the best station award.

A new evening schedule was introduced in September 2006, dividing the week by genre.

=== 2010s ===
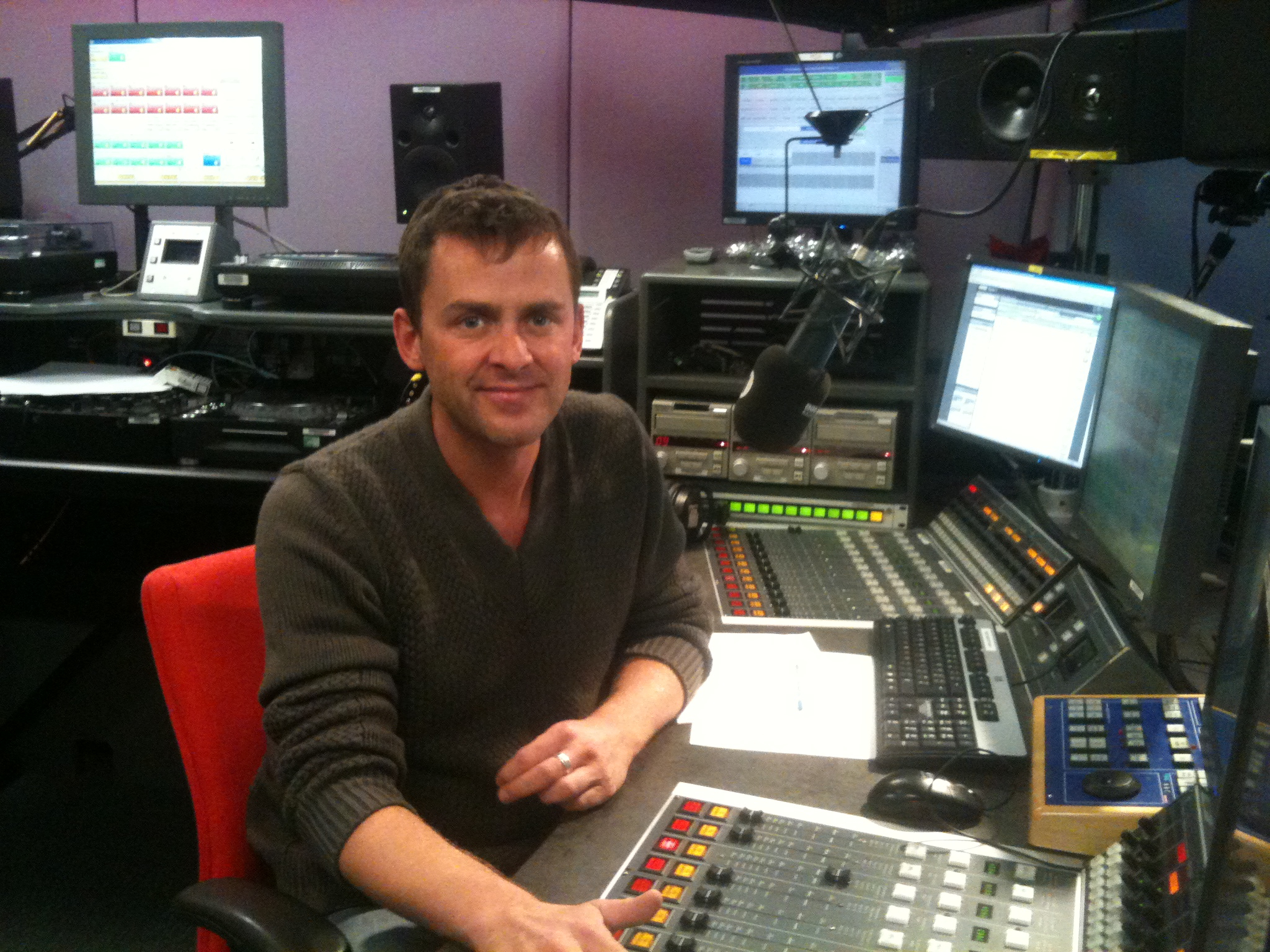
Scott Mills in the Radio 1 studio, 2011

The licence-fee funding of Radio 1, alongside Radio 2, is often criticised by the commercial sector. In the first quarter of 2011 Radio 1 was part of an efficiency review conducted by John Myers. His role, according to Andrew Harrison, the chief executive of RadioCentre, was "to identify both areas of best practice and possible savings."

The controller of Radio 1 and sister station 1Xtra changed to Ben Cooper on 28 October 2011, following the departure of Andy Parfitt. Ben Cooper answered to the Director of BBC Audio and Music, Tim Davie.

On 7 December 2011, Ben Cooper's first major changes to the station were announced. Skream & Benga, Toddla T, Charlie Sloth and Friction replaced Judge Jules, Gilles Peterson, Kissy Sell Out and Fabio & Grooverider. A number of shows were shuffled to incorporate the new line-up. On 28 February 2012, further changes were announced. Greg James and Scott Mills swapped shows and Jameela Jamil, Gemma Cairney and Danny Howard joined the station. The new line-up of DJs for In New DJs We Trust was also announced with B.Traits, Mosca, Jordan Suckley and Julio Bashmore hosting shows on a four weekly rotation. This new schedule took effect on Monday, 2 April 2012.

In September 2012, Nick Grimshaw replaced Chris Moyles as host of "Radio 1's Breakfast Show". Grimshaw previously hosted Mon-Thurs 10pm-Midnight, Weekend Breakfast, and Sunday evenings alongside Annie Mac. Grimshaw was replaced by Phil Taggart and Alice Levine on the 10pm-Midnight show.

In November 2012, another series of changes were announced. This included the departure of Reggie Yates and Vernon Kay. Jameela Jamil was announced as the new presenter of The Official Chart. Matt Edmondson moved to weekend mornings with Tom Deacon briefly replacing him on Wednesday nights. Daniel Howell and Phil Lester, famous YouTubers and video bloggers, joined the station. The changes took effect in January 2013.

Former presenter Sara Cox hosted her last show on Radio 1 in February 2014 before moving back to Radio 2. In March 2014, Gemma Cairney left the weekend breakfast show to host the weekday early breakfast slot, swapping shows with Dev.

In September 2014, Radio 1 operated a series of changes to their output which saw many notable presenters leave the station – including Edith Bowman, Nihal and Rob da Bank. Huw Stephens gained a new show hosting 10 pm – 1 am Monday–Wednesday with Alice Levine presenting weekends 1 pm – 4 pm. Radio 1's Residency also expanded with Skream joining the rotational line-up on Thursday nights (10 pm – 1 am).

From December 2014 to April 2016, Radio 1 included a weekly late night show presented by a well known Internet personality called The Internet Takeover. Shows have been presented by various YouTubers such as Jim Chapman and Hannah Witton.

In January 2015, Clara Amfo replaced Jameela Jamil as host of The Official Chart on Sundays (4 pm – 7 pm) and in March, Zane Lowe left Radio 1 and was replaced by Annie Mac on the new music evening show.

In May 2015, Fearne Cotton left the station after 10 years of broadcasting. Her weekday mid-morning show was taken over by Clara Amfo. Adele Roberts also joined the weekday schedule line-up, hosting the Early Breakfast show.

In July 2015, the Official Chart moved to a Friday from 4 pm to 5:45 pm, hosted by Greg James. The move took place to take into account the changes to the release dates of music globally. Cel Spellman joined the station to host Sunday evenings.

In September 2017, a new slot namely Radio 1's Greatest Hits was introduced for weekends 10am-1pm. The show started on 2 September 2017. On 30 September 2017, Radio 1 celebrated its 50th birthday. Commemorations included a three-day pop-up station, 'Radio 1 Vintage', celebrating the station's presenters and special on-air programmes on the day itself, including a special breakfast show co-presented by the station's launch DJ Tony Blackburn, which is also broadcast on BBC Radio 2.

In October 2017, another major schedule change was announced. Friction left the station. The change features Charlie Sloth gained a new slot called 'The 8th' which aired Mon-Thu 9-11pm. Other changes include MistaJam took over Danny Howard on the Dance Anthems. Katie Thistleton joined Cel Spellman on Sunday evenings, namely 'Life Hacks' (4-6pm) which features content from the Radio 1 Surgery, and Most Played (6-7pm). Danny Howard would host a new show on Friday 11pm-1am. Huw Stephens's show pushed to 11pm-1am. Kan D Man and DJ Limelight joined the station to host a weekly Asian Beats show on Sundays between 1-3am, Rene LaVice joined the station with the Drum & Bass show on Tuesdays 1-3am. Phil Taggart presented the Hype Chart on Tuesdays 3-4am.

In February 2018, the first major schedule change of the year happened on the weekend. This saw Maya Jama and Jordan North join BBC Radio 1 to present the Radio 1's Greatest Hits, which would be on Saturday and Sunday respectively. Alice Levine moved to the breakfast slot to join Dev. Matt Edmondson would replace Alice Levine's original slot in the afternoon and joined by a different guest co-presenter each week. The changes took into effect on 24 February 2018.

In April 2018, another major schedule change was made due to the incorporation of weekend schedule on Fridays. This means that Nick Grimshaw, Clara Amfo and Greg James would host four days in a week. Scott Mills became the new host for The Official Chart and Dance Anthems, which replaces Greg James, and Maya Jama would present The Radio 1's Greatest Hits on 10am-1pm. Mollie King joined Matt Edmondson officially on the 1-4pm slot, namely 'Matt and Mollie'. The changes took into effect on 15 June 2018.

In May 2018, it was announced that Nick Grimshaw would leave the Breakfast Show after six years, the second longest run hosting the show in history (only second to Chris Moyles). However, Grimshaw did not leave the station, but swapped slots with Greg James, who hosted the home time show from 4-7pm weekdays. This change took place as of 20 August 2018 for the Radio 1 Breakfast Show (which was then renamed to Radio 1 Breakfast). Grimshaw's show started on 3 September 2018.

In June 2018, another series of schedule changes was announced. This sees the BBC Introducing Show with Huw Stephens on Sundays 11pm-1am. Jack Saunders joined the station and presented Radio 1 Indie Show from Monday-Thursday 11pm-1am. Other changes include the shows rearrangement of Sunday evenings. Phil Taggart's chillest show moved to 7-9pm, then followed by The Rock Show with Daniel P Carter at 9-11pm. The changes took into effect in September 2018.

In October 2018, Charlie Sloth announced that he was leaving Radio 1 and 1Xtra after serving the station for nearly 10 years. He was hosting The 8th and The Rap Show at that point. His last show was expected to be on 3 November 2018. However, Charlie had been in the spotlight for storming the stage and delivering a sweary, Kanye West-esque rant at the Audio & Radio Industry Awards (ARIAS) on Thursday 18 October 2018, which points towards Edith Bowman. Charlie was nominated for best specialist music show at the ARIAS – a category he lost out on to Soundtracking with Edith Bowman and prompting him to appear on stage during her acceptance. He apologised on Twitter regarding this issue and Radio 1 had agreed with Charlie that he will not do the 10 remaining shows that were originally planned. This meant that his last show ended on 18 October 2018. From 20 October 2018 onwards, Seani B filled his The Rap Show slot on 9pm-11pm and Dev covered "The 8th" beginning 22 October 2018.

In the same month, B.Traits announced that she was leaving BBC Radio 1 after six years of commitment. She said she feels as though she can no longer devote the necessary time needed to make the show the best it can be, and is moving on to focus on new projects and adventures. Her last show was on 26 October 2018. The Essential Mix was then shifted earlier to 1am-3am, followed by Radio 1's Wind-Down from 3 am to 6 am. The changes took effect from 2 November 2018 onwards.

At the end of October 2018, Dev's takeover on The 8th resulted in the swapping between Matt Edmondson and Mollie King's show with Dev and Alice Levine's show. This meant that Matt and Mollie became the new Weekend Breakfast hosts, and Dev and Alice became the afternoon show hosts. The changes came into effect on 16 November 2018.

On 15 November 2018, Radio 1 announced that Tiffany Calver, who has previously hosted a dedicated hip-hop show on the new-music station KissFresh, would join the station and host the Rap Show. The change took effect from 5 January 2019.

On 26 November 2018, Radio 1 announced that the new hosts for the evening slot previously hosted by Charlie Sloth would be Rickie Haywood-Williams, Melvin Odoom, and Charlie Hedges. The trio previously presented on Kiss's breakfast show. The change took effect in April 2019.

In July 2019, it was announced that there would be two new shows on the weekend, the weekend early breakfast show and best new pop, both of which started on 6 September 2019.

The weekend early morning breakfast show would be and is currently hosted by Arielle Free. It is broadcast between 04:00–06:00 on Friday and Saturday and Sunday between 05:00–07:00.

=== 2020s ===
Due to the COVID-19 pandemic, there were temporary changes. In March 2020, Radio 1 Breakfast began later at 7 am to 11 am. Scott Mills would also present his show from 1 pm-3 pm with Nick Grimshaw starting until 6 pm. BBC Radio 1 Dance Anthems now started from 3 pm with 2 hours Classic Anthems and it would end at 7 pm.

In July 2020, Alice Levine and Cel Spellman announced their resignation from BBC Radio 1. In September, Vick Hope was announced to join Katie Thistleton, replacing Spellman.

In September 2020, a new schedule was announced, which saw Radio 1 Breakfast air from 7am to 10.30am, followed by Clara Amfo from 10.30am to 12.45pm, Scott Mills from 1pm to 3.30pm and Nick Grimshaw from 3.30pm to 5.45pm. Evening slots were also all brought forward by an hour.

On 26 September 2020, MistaJam left BBC Radio 1 and BBC Radio 1Xtra after 15 years. It was announced that Charlie Hedges would take over Dance Anthems from 3 October 2020.

BBC Radio 1 Dance launched on Friday 9 October 2020.

In November 2020, it was confirmed that Dev Griffin, Huw Stephens, and Phil Taggart would all be leaving the station at the end of the year. From January 2021, Radio 1 Breakfast was to return to five days per week while Arielle Free would host Early Breakfast (Mon-Thu 0500–0700) and three new presenters were to take turns hosting the early breakfast slot on Fridays. Adele Roberts left Early Breakfast after five years, moving to Weekend Breakfast (Sat-Sun 0700–1030). Matt Edmondson and Mollie King returned to Weekend Afternoons (Fri-Sun 1300–1600). On Sunday evenings, Sian Eleri replaced Phil Taggart as host of the Chillest Show and Gemma Bradley replaced Huw Stephens on BBC Introducing.

On 9 April 2021, BBC Radio 1 and other BBC radio stations were cut at 12:10pm for the national anthem following the death of Prince Philip, Duke of Edinburgh, and the stations then carried the BBC Radio News special programme until 4pm. Radio 1 then played music without vocals and on 10 and 11 April 2021 played downtempo and chilled music.

On 20 April 2021, Annie Mac announced she was leaving the station. She was replaced by Clara Amfo on Future Sounds on Monday to Thursday evenings, with Danny Howard taking over her Friday night Dance Party show. Rickie, Melvin and Charlie replaced Amfo in the daytime schedule, whilst Jack Saunders began hosting Monday to Thursday evenings from 8pm to 10pm.

On 21 April 2021, Radio 1 Relax launched on BBC Sounds, playing relaxing music and sounds such as wind and rain.

After 14 years on BBC Radio 1, Nick Grimshaw announced he would be leaving the station, with Vick Hope and Jordan North taking over the time-slot. Grimshaw broadcast his final show on 12 August 2021. Vick and Jordan's new show first aired on 6 September 2021. Vick continued to co-host Life Hacks alongside Katie Thistleton, while Dean McCullough joined BBC Radio 1 to host Friday-Sunday 1030–1300.

On 1 July 2022, it was announced that Scott Mills and Chris Stark would leave the station to host shows on BBC Radio 2 and Capital respectively. They were replaced in their daytime afternoon slot by Dean McCullough and Vicky Hawkesworth, who hosted their show from Salford, with Jack Saunders taking over from Mills as the host of The Official Chart. Katie Thistleton replaced McCullough on Friday and Saturday mornings, with Nat O'Leary hosting a new show, Radio 1 00s, on Sunday mornings from 11am to 1pm.

On 8 September 2022, Radio 1 and the other radio stations were cut at 6:32pm to report the Death of Queen Elizabeth II and carried a BBC Radio News special. Radio 1 resumed broadcasts at 7am on 9 September 2022, playing downtempo music throughout the day and over the weekend. Radio 1 returned to normal programming on 11 September 2022.

On 9 September 2023, Sam MacGregor and Danni Diston replaced Adele Roberts as the host of Radio 1's Weekend Breakfast Show.

On 7 February 2024, the BBC announced plans to launch a new Radio 1 spin-off station on DAB and online via BBC Sounds. The Radio 1 spin-off will focus on music from the 2000s and 2010s, catering to the appetite from young audiences for recent nostalgia. The spin-off station was eventually launched on 8 November 2024 as BBC Radio 1 Anthems.

On 16 February 2024, it was announced that Jordan North would leave the station to host Capital Breakfast alongside Siân Welby and Chris Stark. Katie Thistleton and Jamie Laing began hosting the Going Home show alongside Vick Hope from 4 March 2024.

On 1 July 2024, a new schedule launched, which saw Matt Edmondson and Mollie King begin hosting the weekday afternoon show. Dean McCullough took over from Arielle Free as the host of Early Breakfast, which moved to Salford, with Vicky Hawkesworth and Nat O'Leary hosting Friday, Saturday and Sunday mornings from 10.30am to 1pm. Edmondson and King were eventually replaced in their weekend slot by Sam MacGregor and Danni Diston from January 2025, with James Cusack joining the station to host Radio 1's Weekend Breakfast Show, which also moved to Salford.

As of August 2025 the station announced a new rotation for the “Friday Early Breakfast” slot: Beth Wallace, Jack Remmington and Ash Holme will host on a rotating monthly basis.

== Broadcast ==
=== Studios ===
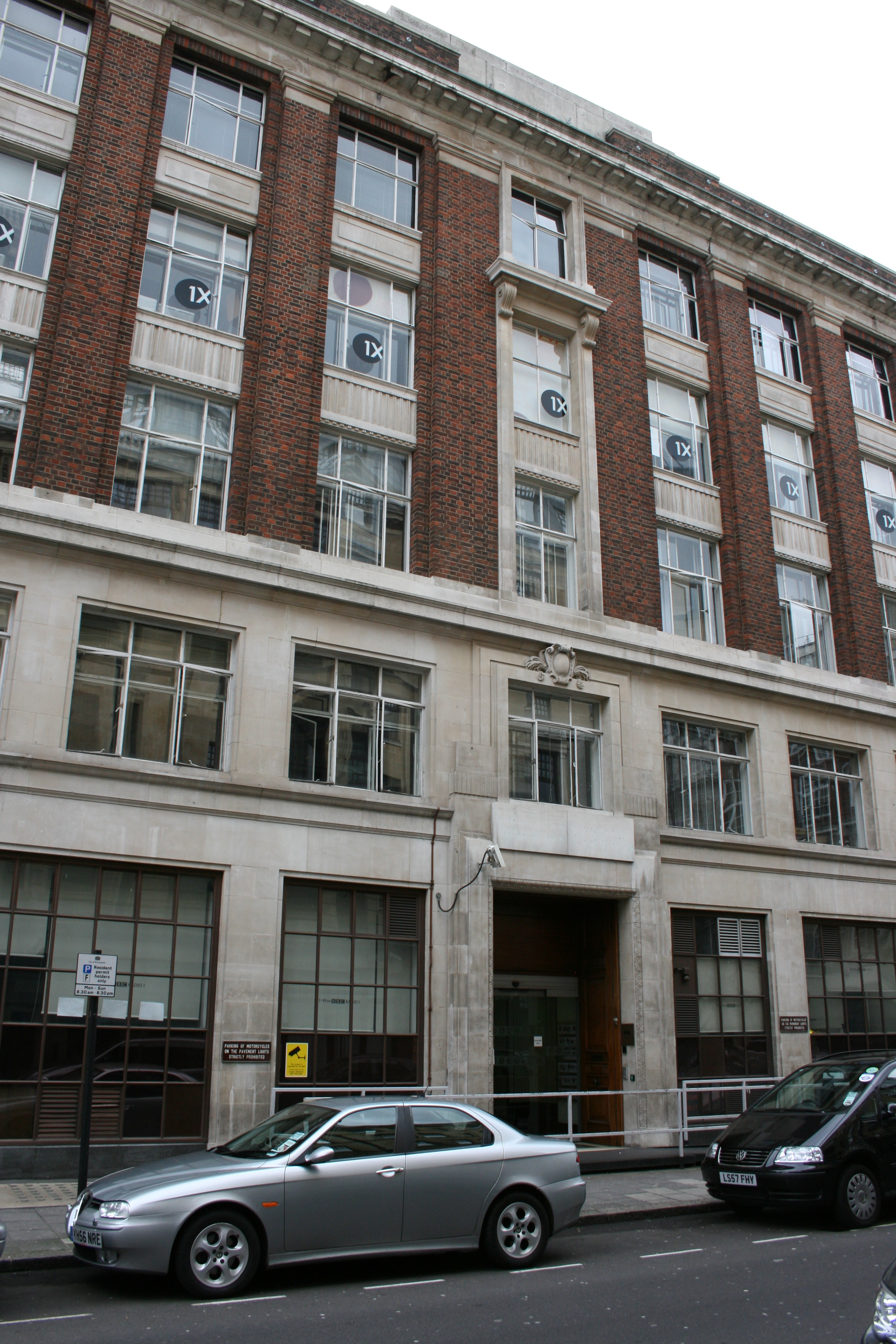
Yalding House, the home of Radio 1 1996–2012

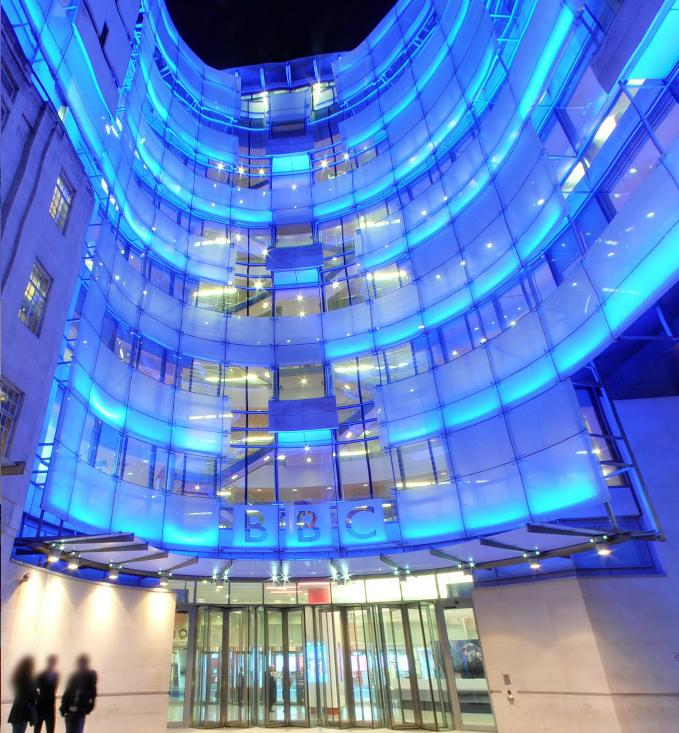
BBC Radio 1 now broadcasts from Broadcasting House, London.

From inception for over 20 years, Radio 1 broadcast from an adjacent pair of continuity suites (originally Con A and Con B) in the main control room of Broadcasting House. These cons were configured to allow DJs to operate the equipment themselves and play their own records and jingle cartridges (called self-op). This was a departure from traditional BBC practice, where a studio manager would play in discs from the studio control cubicle. Due to needle time restrictions, much of the music was played from tapes of BBC session recordings. The DJs were assisted by one or more technical operators (TOs) who would set up tapes and control sound levels during broadcasts.

In 1985, Radio 1 moved across the road from Broadcasting House to Egton House. The station moved to Yalding House in 1996, and Egton House was demolished in 2003 to make way for an extension to Broadcasting House. This extension would eventually be renamed the Egton Wing, and then the Peel Wing.

Until 2012, the studios were located in the basement of Yalding House (near to BBC Broadcasting House) on Great Portland Street in central London. They used to broadcast from two main studios in the basement; Y2 and Y3 (there is also a smaller studio, YP1, used mainly for production). These two main studios (Y2 and Y3) are separated by the "Live Lounge", although it is mainly used as an office; live sets are rarely recorded from it, for Maida Vale Studios is used instead for larger set-ups. The studios are linked by webcams and windows through the "Live Lounge", allowing DJs to see each other when changing between shows. Y2 is the studio from where The Chris Moyles Show was broadcast and is also the studio rigged with static cameras for when the station broadcasts on the "Live Cam".

In December 2012, Radio 1 moved from Yalding House to new studios on the 8th floor of the new BBC Broadcasting House, Portland Place, just a few metres away from the "Peel Wing", formerly the "Egton Wing", which occupies the land on which Egton House previously stood: it was renamed the "Peel Wing" in 2012 in honour of the long-serving BBC Radio 1 presenter, John Peel, who broadcast on the station from its launch in 1967 until his death in 2004.

Programmes have also regularly been broadcast from other regions, notably The Mark and Lard Show, broadcast every weekday from New Broadcasting House, Oxford Road, Manchester for over a decade (October 1993 – March 2004).

In August 2022, the studio 82A (from which Radio 1 broadcasts) was renamed 82Mills, following the departure of the long-running DJ Scott Mills.

=== UK analogue frequencies ===
Radio 1 originally broadcast on 1215 kHz AM (or 247 metres). On 23 November 1978, the station was moved to 1053 kHz and 1089 kHz (285 and 275 m). Supplementary transmitters also operated on 1107 kHz (271 m) in Merseyside and on 1485 kHz (202 m) in the Bournemouth area.

The BBC had been allocated three FM frequency ranges in 1955, for the then Light Programme (now BBC Radio 2), Third Programme (now BBC Radio 3) and Home Service (now BBC Radio 4) stations. When Radio 1 was launched, there was no FM frequency range allocated for the station. The official reason given was that there was no space, even though no commercial stations had yet been launched on FM. As a compromise, Radio 1 was allocated Radio 2's FM transmitters for a few hours each week – on Saturday afternoons from 1pm until 7pm, Sunday teatime from 5pm until midnight, Monday to Friday nights from 10pm until midnight (This was also due to the AM signal tropo interference from Europe at that time) and Bank Holiday afternoons from 2pm until 7pm when Radio 2 was broadcasting on medium wave, the holiday edition of Sport on 2.

=== Full-time FM broadcasting ===
Due to the rising competition from commercial FM stations, the BBC began to draw up plans for Radio 1 to broadcast on FM full time. This process began in London on 31 October 1987, at low power on a temporary frequency of 104.8 MHz. The Department of Trade and Industry (predecessor to Ofcom) who were then the regulators for allocation of radio bandwidths in the UK, began to free up FM police and emergency communication frequencies which were operating from 97.9 MHz to 102.0 MHz. This was in preparation for new FM radio stations planned for the future. The BBC acquired 97.9 FM to 99.8 FM specifically for Radio 1.

The rollout of Radio 1 on FM nationally began on 1 September 1988, starting with Central Scotland (98.6 MHz), the Midlands (98.4 MHz) and the north of England (98.8 MHz). On 24 November 1988, Belfast was added to the network on another temporary frequency on 96.0 MHz.

Due to the expansion of Radio 1's FM network, Radio 1 scaled back its airtime on Radio 2's FM frequencies in three phases:

Phase 1 – from October 1988, ending on weeknights (10pm–midnight) and Sunday evenings (7pm–midnight).

Phase 2 was introduced from December 1989 – ceasing Saturday afternoons (1pm–7pm).

Phase 3 – from March 1990, the prime Sunday slot for the UK Top 40 (5pm–7pm), ceased.

Once the fourth BBC national network Radio 1 transmission range was sufficient to cover most of the United Kingdom, after 23 years the shared FM frequency alliance between Radios 1 and 2 came to an end.

This resulted BBC Radio 2 transmitting on FM full-time, where Radio 2's former AM frequencies – 693 & 909 – were allocated to BBC Radio 5.

After reorganisation of the FM frequencies, specifically in London (from 104.8 to 98.8 MHz), the Midlands (98.4 to 97.9 MHz) and Belfast (96.0 to 99.7 MHz), the engineering programme was completed in 1995.

Radio 1 made great efforts to promote its new FM service, renaming itself on-air initially as 'Radio 1 FM' and later as '1FM' until 1995.

Until 2024, the station's RDS name displayed "Radio 1". Since 2024 the RDS name now displays as "BBC R1" in line with the other BBC stations.

=== End of medium wave broadcasting – 1053 / 1089 kHz ===
The Conservative government decided to increase competition on AM and disallowed the simulcasting of services on both AM and FM, affecting both BBC and Independent Local Radio. Radio 1's medium wave frequencies were reallocated to Independent National Radio. Radio 1's last broadcast on MW was on 1 July 1994, with Stephen Duffy's "Kiss Me" being the last record played on MW just before 9 am. For those who continued to listen, just after 9 am, Radio 1 jingles were played in reverse chronological order ending with its first jingle from 30 September 1967. In the initial months after this closure, a pre-recorded message by Mark Goodier was played to advise listeners that Radio 1 was now an "FM-only" station and to retune to the FM frequency. Around this time, Radio 1 began broadcasting on spare audio subcarriers on Sky Television's via Astra's SES satellite analogue service; initially in mono (on UK Gold) and later in stereo (on UK Living) transponders. The 1053 / 1089 frequencies were allocated to the then newly created Talk Radio UK.

=== Digital distribution ===
The BBC launched its national radio stations on DAB digital radio in 1995; however, the technology was expensive at the time and so was not marketed, instead used as a test for future technologies. DAB was "officially" launched in 2002 as sets became cheaper. Today it can also be heard on UK digital TV services Freeview, Virgin Media, Sky and the Internet as well as FM. In July 2005, Sirius Satellite Radio began simulcasting Radio 1 across the United States as channel 11 on its own service and channel 6011 on Dish Network satellite TV. Sirius Canada began simulcasting Radio 1 when it was launched on 1 December 2005 (also on channel 11). The Sirius simulcasts were time shifted five hours to allow US and Canadian listeners in the Eastern Time Zone to hear Radio 1 at the same time of day as UK listeners. On 12 November 2008, Radio 1 made its debut on XM Satellite Radio in both the US and Canada on channel 29, moving to XM 15 and Sirius 15 on 4 May 2011. Until the full station was removed in August 2011, Radio 1 was able to be heard by approximately 20.6 million listeners in North America on satellite radio alone. BBC Radio 1 can be heard on cable in the Netherlands at 105.10 FM.

=== SiriusXM cancellation in North America ===
At midnight on 9 August 2011, Sirius XM ceased carrying BBC Radio 1 programming with no prior warning. On 10 August 2011, the BBC issued the following statement:

The BBC's commercial arm BBC Worldwide has been in partnership with SIRIUS Satellite Radio to broadcast Radio 1 on their main network, since 2005. This agreement has now unfortunately come to an end and BBC Worldwide are in current discussions with the satellite radio station to find ways to continue to bring popular music channel, BBC Radio 1, to the US audience. We will keep you posted.

Thousands of angry Sirius XM customers began a campaign on Facebook and other social media to reinstate BBC Radio 1 on Sirius XM Radio. One week later, Sirius and the BBC agreed on a new carriage agreement that saw Radio 1 broadcast on a time-shifted format on the Sirius XM Internet Radio platform only, on channel 815.

Starting on 15 January 2012, The Official Chart Show began broadcasting on SiriusXM 20on20 channel 3, at 4 pm and 9 pm Eastern Standard Time.

=== Regionalisation ===
From 1999 until 2012, Radio 1 split the home nations for localised programming in Scotland, Wales and Northern Ireland, to allow the broadcast of a showcase programme for regional talent. Most recently, these shows were under the BBC Introducing brand. Scotland, Wales and Northern Ireland had their own shows, which were broadcast on a 3-week rotational basis in England.

From January 2011 until June 2012, Scotland's show was presented by Ally McCrae. Previously it was hosted by Vic Galloway (who also presents for BBC Radio Scotland); who had presented the show solo since 2004, after his original co-host Gill Mills departed.

Wales's show was hosted by Jen Long between January 2011 until May 2012. Previously Bethan Elfyn occupied the slot, who had at one time hosted alongside Huw Stephens, until Stephens left to join the national network, although he still broadcasts a show for Wales – a Welsh-language music show on BBC Radio Cymru on Thursday evenings.

Phil Taggart presented the Northern Ireland programme between November 2011 and May 2012. The show was formerly presented by Rory McConnell. Before joining the national network, Colin Murray was a presenter on The Session in Northern Ireland, along with Donna Legge; after Murray's promotion to the network Legge hosted alone for a time, and on her departure McConnell took her place.

The regional opt-outs originally went out from 8 pm to 10 pm on Thursdays (the Evening Session's time slot) and were known as the "Session in the Nations" (the "Session" tag was later dropped due to the demise of the Evening Session); they later moved to run from 7:30 pm to 9 pm, with the first half-hour of Zane Lowe's programme going out across the whole of the UK. On 18 October 2007 the regional programmes moved to a Wednesday night/Thursday morning slot from midnight to 2 am under the BBC Introducing banner, allowing Lowe's Thursday show to be aired across the network; prior to this change Huw Stephens had presented the Wednesday midnight show nationally. In January 2011, BBC Introducing was moved to the new time slot of midnight to 2 am on Monday mornings, and the Scottish and Welsh shows were given new presenters in the form of Ally McCrae and Jen Long.

The opt-outs were only available to listeners on the FM frequencies. Because of the way the DAB and digital TV services of Radio 1 are broadcast (a single-frequency network on DAB and a single broadcast feed of Radio 1 on TV platforms), the digital version of the station was not regionalised.

The BBC Trust announced in May 2012 that the regional music programmes on Radio 1 would be replaced with a single programme offering a UK-wide platform for new music as part of a series of cost-cutting measures across the BBC. In June 2012, the regional shows ended and were replaced by a single BBC Introducing show presented by Jen Long and Ally McCrae.

== Content ==
=== Music ===
Because of its youth-orientated nature, Radio 1 plays a broad mix of current and potential future hits, including indie/alternative, hip-hop/R&B, rock, dance/electronica and pop which differs from many other top 40 stations, both in the UK and across the world. Since its progressive view on modern electronic music, the BBC Radio 1 is widely known in the worldwide drum and bass community, frequently hosting producers and DJs like Hybrid Minds or Wilkinson.

Due to restrictions on the amount of commercial music that could be played on radio in the UK until 1988 (the "needle time" limitation) the station has recorded many live performances. Studio sessions (recordings of about four tracks made in a single day), also supplemented the live music content, many of them finding their way to commercially available LPs and CDs. The sessions recorded for John Peel's late night programme are particularly renowned. The station has continued to record live music with its Live Lounge feature and the Piano Sessions, which started in November 2014.

The station also broadcasts documentaries and interviews. Although this type of programming arose from necessity it has given the station diversity. The needletime restrictions meant the station tended to have a higher level of speech by DJs. While the station is often criticised for "waffling" by presenters, an experimental "more music day" in 1988 was declared a failure after only a third of callers favoured it.

=== News and current affairs ===
Radio 1 has a public service broadcasting obligation to provide news, which it fulfills through Newsbeat bulletins throughout the day. Shared with 1Xtra and Asian Network, short news summaries are provided roughly hourly on the half-hour between 06:30 and 16:30, with two additional 15-minute bulletins at 12:45 and 17:45 and nine summaries over the weekend and Bank Holiday between 07:30 and 15:30.

=== Online visualisation and social media ===
In recent years Radio 1 has used social media to help reach a younger audience. Its YouTube channel now has over 7.5 million subscribers. The highest viewed videos on the channel are predominately live music performances from the Live Lounge.

The station also has a heavy presence on social media, with audience interaction occurring through Facebook and Twitter as well as text messaging.

It was announced in 2013 that Radio 1 had submitted plans to launch its own dedicated video channel on the BBC iPlayer where videos of live performances as well as some features and shows would be streamed in a central location. Plans were approved by the BBC Trust in November 2014 and the channel launched on 10 November 2014.

=== Special programming ===
==== Bank Holiday programming ====
Radio 1 provides alternative programming on some Bank Holidays. Programmes have included 'The 10 Hour Takeover', a request-based special, in which the DJs on air would encourage listeners to select any available track to play, 'One Hit Wonder Day' and 'The Chart of the Decade' where the 150 biggest selling singles in the last 10 years were counted down and played in full.

==== Anniversary programming ====
On Sunday 30 September 2007, Radio 1 celebrated its 40th birthday. To mark this anniversary Radio 1 hosted a week of special features, including a re-creation of Simon Bates' Golden Hour, and 40 different artists performing 40 different covers, one from each year since Radio 1 was established. On Saturday 30 September 2017, Radio 1 celebrated its 50th birthday. Tony Blackburn recreated the first ever Radio 1 broadcast on Radio 2, simulcast on pop-up station Radio 1 Vintage, followed by The Radio 1 Breakfast Show celebration, tricast on Radio 1, Radio 2 and Radio 1 Vintage, presented by Tony Blackburn and Nick Grimshaw, featuring former presenters as guests Simon Mayo, Sara Cox and Mike Read.

==== Charity ====
Radio 1 regularly supports the BBC's in house charities Comic Relief, Sport Relief and Children in Need.

On 18 March 2011, BBC's Radio 1 longest-serving breakfast DJ Chris Moyles and sidekick Dave Vitty broadcast for 52 hours as part of a Guinness World Record attempt, in aid of Comic Relief. The pair stayed on air for 52 hours in total setting a new world record for 'Radio DJ Endurance Marathon (Team)' after already breaking Simon Mayo's 12-year record for Radio 1's Longest Show of 37 hours which he set in 1999, also for Comic Relief.

The presenters started on 16 March 2011 and came off air at 10:30 am on 18 March 2011. During this Fearne Cotton made a bet with DJ Chris Moyles that if they raise over £2,000,000 she will appear on the show in a swimsuit. After passing the £2,000,000 mark, Cotton appeared on the studio webcam in a stripy monochrome swimsuit. The appearance of Cotton between 10:10 am and 10:30 am caused the Radio 1 website to crash due to a high volume of traffic.

In total the event raised £2,622,421 for Comic Relief.

==== Drama ====
In 1981, Radio 1 broadcast a radio adaptation of the space opera film, Star Wars. The 13-episode serial was adapted for radio by the author Brian Daley and directed by John Madden, and was a co-production between the BBC and the American Broadcaster NPR.

In 1994, Radio 1 broadcast a radio adaptation of the Batman comic book storyline Knightfall, as part of the Mark Goodier show, featuring Michael Gough recreating his movie role as Alfred. Later that same year, Radio 1 also broadcast a re-edited version of the Radio 4 Superman radio drama.

==== Comedy ====
Notable comedy programming includes two series of fast-paced sketches, songs and hoax phone calls by Victor Lewis-Smith in his signature style which garnered a Best Comedy Radio Programme award in the 1990 British Comedy Awards.

== Events ==
=== Radio 1 Roadshows ===
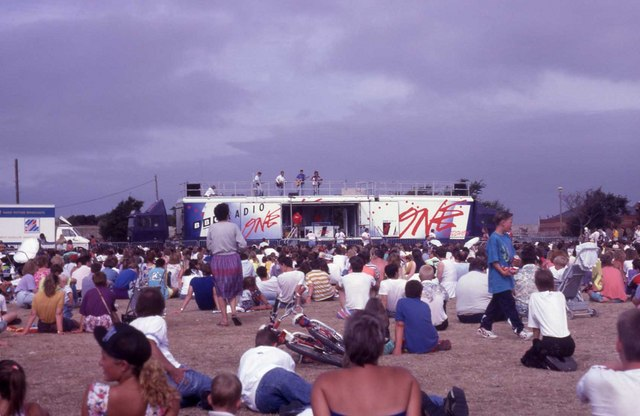
Radio 1 Roadshow in Southsea, 1990

The Radio 1 Roadshow, which usually involved Radio 1 DJs and pop stars travelling around popular UK seaside destinations, began in 1973, as a response to the imminent introduction of local commercial radio stations. hosted by Alan Freeman in Newquay, Cornwall, with the final one held at Heaton Park, Manchester in 1999. Although the Roadshow attracted large crowds and the style changed with the style of the station itself—such as the introduction of whistlestop audio postcards of each location in 1994 ("2minuteTour")—they were still rooted in the older style of the station, and therefore fit for retirement.

=== BBC Radio 1's Big Weekend ===
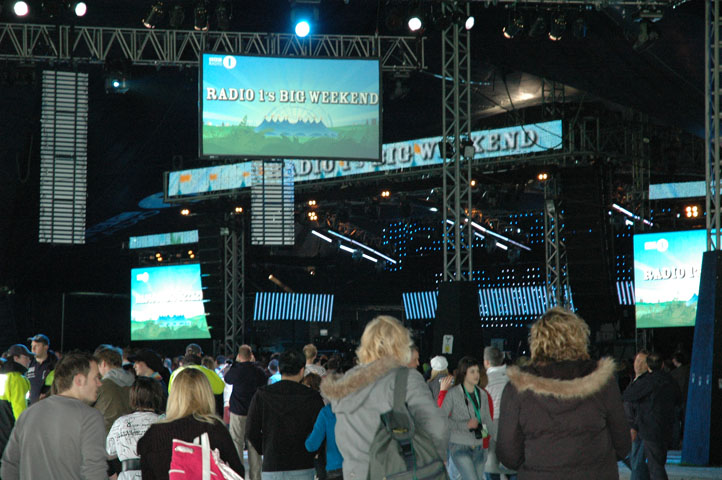
Radio 1's Big Weekend stage, 2007

In March 2000, Radio 1 decided to change the Roadshow format, renaming it One Big Sunday in the process. Several of these Sundays were held in large city-centre parks. In 2003, the event changed again and was rebranded One Big Weekend, with each event occurring biannually and covering two days. Under this name, it visited Derry in Northern Ireland, as part of the Music Lives campaign, and Perry Park in Birmingham.

The most recent change occurred in 2005 when the event was yet again renamed and the decision taken to hold only one per year, this time as Radio 1's Big Weekend. Venues under this title have included Herrington Country Park, Camperdown Country Park, Moor Park–which was the first Weekend to feature a third stage–Mote Park, Lydiard Park, Bangor and Carlisle Airport.

Tickets for each Big Weekend are given away free of charge, making it the largest free ticketed music festival in Europe.

BBC Radio 1's Big Weekend was replaced by a larger festival in 2012, named 'Radio 1's Hackney Weekend', with a crowd capacity of 100,000. The Hackney Weekend took place over the weekend of 23–24 June 2012 in Hackney Marshes, Hackney, London. The event was to celebrate the 2012 Cultural Olympiad in London and had artists such as Rihanna, Jay-Z and Florence and the Machine.

In 2013, Radio 1's Big Weekend returned to Derry as part of the City of Culture 2013 celebrations. So far, Derry is the only city to have hosted the Big Weekend twice.

In May 2014, Radio 1's Big Weekend was held in Glasgow, Scotland. Acts which played at the event included Rita Ora, The 1975, Katy Perry, Jake Bugg and Pharrell Williams. The event was opened on the Friday with a dance set in George Square, featuring Radio 1 Dance DJs such as Danny Howard and Pete Tong, and other well-known acts such as Martin Garrix and Tiesto.

In 2015, the event was held in Norwich and featured performances from the likes of Taylor Swift, Muse, David Guetta, Years & Years and others.

2016 saw the event make its way to Exeter. It was headlined by Coldplay, who closed the weekend on the Sunday evening.

The event was in Hull in 2017 and saw performances by artists such as Zara Larsson, Shawn Mendes, Stormzy, Katy Perry, Little Mix, Sean Paul, Rita Ora, The Chainsmokers, Clean Bandit and Kings of Leon.

To take advantage of Glastonbury Festival's fallow year in 2018, 4 separate Big Weekends were held simultaneously between 25 and 28 May. Stylized as "BBC Music's Biggest Weekend", events were held in Swansea (with a line-up curated by Radio 1), Coventry and Perth (both curated by Radio 2) and Belfast (curated by Radio 6 Music). Tickets sold out for the Swansea, Perth and Coventry Big Weekends.

In 2020, the Big Weekend at Dundee was cancelled as a result of the COVID-19 pandemic. In May 2020, Radio 1 announced a virtual Big Weekend. It took place from 22 to 24 May and featured performances from artists like Mabel and Anne-Marie.

=== Ibiza Weekend ===
Radio 1 has annually held a dance music weekend broadcast live from Ibiza since the 1990s. The weekend is usually the first weekend in August and has performances from world-famous DJs and Radio 1's own dance music talent such as Pete Tong and Annie Mac.

=== BBC Radio 1's Teen Awards ===
BBC Radio 1's Teen Awards
- Location: Hammersmith Apollo (2008–2010); Wembley Arena (2011–2018); Television Centre, London (2019)
- Country: United Kingdom
- Presented by: BBC Radio 1
- Formerly called: BBC Switch Live; Switch Live Awards (2009)
- First award: 2009; 17 years ago
- Website: Official website

Television/radio coverage
- Network: BBC Radio 1; BBC Two (2008, 2018–2019); BBC One (2009); BBC Three (2010–2013); CBBC (2014–2016); BBC Red Button (2017)

In September 2008, Radio 1 launched an annual music event for teenagers aged 14 to 17 years. Originally named BBC Switch Live, the first event was held on 12 October 2008 at the Hammersmith Apollo. In 2009, the event became an annual awards ceremony and the following year was renamed BBC Radio 1's Teen Awards. The awards honoured inspirational teens alongside the best music, movies, TV and sport stars in a variety of categories. In 2011, it was moved to Wembley Arena and later Studio 1 at Television Centre, London. Highlights of the event has been broadcast across BBC Television.

Despite the awards ceremony not taking place since 2019, the main award, "Teen Hero", has continued to be awarded by Radio 1 as Teen Heroes.

==== Presenters ====
The event has been hosted by various Radio 1 DJs and guest co-hosts.

Year	Date	Presenter(s)	Ref.
BBC Switch Live
2008	12 October	Annie Mac	
2008	12 October	Nick Grimshaw	
2008	12 October	Greg James	
2008	12 October	Fearne Cotton	
2008	12 October	Kelly Osbourne	
2008	12 October	Tom Deacon	
2009	8 November	Kimberley Walsh	
2009	8 November	Nick Grimshaw	
BBC Radio 1's Teen Awards
2010	14 November	Fearne Cotton	
2010	14 November	Nick Grimshaw	
2011	9 October	Nick Grimshaw	
2011	9 October	Mollie King	
2012	7 October	Nick Grimshaw	
2013	3 November	Nick Grimshaw	
2013	3 November	Rita Ora	
2014	19 October	Nick Grimshaw	
2014	19 October	Rita Ora	
2015	8 November	Nick Grimshaw	
2015	8 November	Demi Lovato	
2016	23 October	Nick Grimshaw	
2016	23 October	Dua Lipa	
2017	23 October	Nick Grimshaw	
2017	23 October	Rita Ora	
2018	21 October	Greg James	
2018	21 October	Mollie King	
2018	21 October	Maya Jama	
2019	24 November	Greg James	
2019	24 November	Mollie King	
2019	24 November	Maya Jama	

==== Performances ====
Year	Performers (chronologically)
2008	Basshunter, Fall Out Boy, George Sampson, McFly, Miley Cyrus, N-Dubz, Ne-Yo
2009	Alexandra Burke, Black Eyed Peas, JLS, N-Dubz, Pixie Lott, Shaheen Jafargholi, The Saturdays
2010	JLS, Katy Perry, Professor Green, Taylor Swift, The Wanted
2011	Cher Lloyd, Ed Sheeran, Jason Derulo, Joe Jonas, One Direction, Pixie Lott, Rizzle Kicks
2012	Conor Maynard, Fun, Little Mix, Ne-Yo, One Direction, Taylor Swift
2013	Fall Out Boy, Icona Pop, James Arthur, Jessie J, Rizzle Kicks, Tinie Tempah
2014	Ariana Grande, Ella Henderson, Labrinth, Rixton, The Vamps (feat. Shawn Mendes)
2015	5 Seconds of Summer, All Time Low, Demi Lovato, Justin Bieber, Little Mix, Nick Jonas
2016	DNCE, Jess Glynne, Little Mix, Niall Horan, Shawn Mendes, The Vamps
2017	Camila Cabello, Dua Lipa, Liam Payne, Rita Ora, The Vamps
2018	5 Seconds of Summer, HRVY, Jack & Jack, Jonas Blue, Liam Payne, Little Mix, Mabel, Not3s, Sigrid
2019	AJ Tracey, Ella Henderson, Jax Jones, Yungblud

=== Edinburgh Festival ===
Radio 1 often has a presence at the Edinburgh Festival Fringe. Past events have included 'The Fun and Filth Cabaret' and 'Scott Mills: The Musical'.

=== Europe's Biggest Dance Show ===
Europe's Biggest Dance Show is a series of dance music oriented radio specials produced by Radio 1.

The first, Europe's Biggest Dance Show 2019, was broadcast on Friday 11 October 2019 where Radio 1 joined with several European radio stations, all members of the European Broadcasting Union, including Swedish SR P3, German 1LIVE and RBB Fritz, Belgian VRT Studio Brussel, Irish RTÉ 2fm, French Radio France Mouv and Dutch NPO 3FM.

A second show, Europe's Biggest Dance Show 2020, was broadcast on Friday 8 May 2020. It had the same contributing stations as 2019; however, it had begun at 7 pm BST, rather than 8 pm as the previous year.

The third instalment of Europe's Biggest Dance Show was broadcast on Friday 23 October 2020. French Mouv' dropped out of the broadcast until further notice while Finnish YleX and Norwegian NRK mP3 joined the show.

A fourth show, Europe's Biggest Dance Show 2021, was broadcast on Friday 29 October 2021. It saw the first contribution of Austrian station FM4, while the Dutch NPO 3FM dropped out.

The fifth instalment, Europe's Biggest Dance Show 2022, was broadcast on Friday 14 October 2022. It saw the first contribution the Ukrainian Radio Promin of UA:PBC and the return of Dutch NPO 3FM to the show.

=== Radio 1's summer stunts ===
Since 2018, BBC Radio 1 has performed format-breaking listener stunts. In 2018, Greg James and Nick Grimshaw played Hide and Seek on the radio and were found after 22 hours at the Royal Liver Building in Liverpool. In 2019 James and Grimshaw hid at the Grand Pier, Weston-super-Mare for almost 26 hours.

In the summer of 2021 Radio 1 held Radio 1's Summer Breakout, where James was locked inside a camper van and had to escape by entering a password. James escaped the van after 62 hours. The following year, James was booted off the Radio 1 Breakfast Show and had to complete a giant 20-piece jigsaw puzzle to find the missing pieces scattered across the United Kingdom. After six days, James completed the puzzle and was reinstated as host of the Breakfast show.

In the summer of 2023, all DJs other than Greg James went into hiding, with James and the listeners asked to piece back the schedule and find all 30 DJs. On 20 July, James and the listeners were informed that if any DJs were still missing by noon (UK time) on 21 July the station would go off air. Mollie King was still hidden at this time, so the station went off air for five minutes, between 12:00 and 12:05, before returning to broadcasting at 12:05 pm.

== Online-only sister stations ==
On 17 September 2020, the BBC announced that it would launch an online-only sister station for BBC Radio 1, called BBC Radio 1 Dance, which would primarily play all kinds of songs from the Dance genre. The station was launched on 9 October 2020 at 6 pm BST.

A second online-only sister station, BBC Radio 1 Relax, was launched on 22 April 2021. The station played a selection of relaxation and well-being focused shows. The station closed on 24 July 2024, following the announcement that the BBC would be launching three new digital stations on BBC Sounds.

In September 2024, the BBC launched 2 new online-only radio stations, one of them being BBC Radio 1 Anthems.

== Controllers/Head of Station ==
Years served	Controller
1967–1969	Robin Scott
1969–1976	Douglas Muggeridge
1976–1978	Charles McLelland
1978–1985	Derek Chinnery
1985–1993	Johnny Beerling
1993–1998	Matthew Bannister
1998–2011	Andy Parfitt
2011–2020	Ben Cooper
2020–present	Aled Haydn Jones

== Former logos ==
BBC Radio 1 logo from its 1967 launch

BBC Radio 1 logo from 1976 to 1988

BBC Radio 1 logo from 1988 to 1990

BBC Radio 1 logo from 1990 to 1994

BBC Radio 1 logo from 1994 to 1997

BBC Radio 1 logo from 2007 to 2021

== Awards and nominations ==
=== International Dance Music Awards ===
Radio 1 has won the International Dance Music Awards' Best Radio Station every year from 2002 to 2020 with the exception of 2010.

== See also ==
- Category:BBC Radio 1 presenters
- List of BBC radio stations
- Radio 1 Podcasts
- BBC Radio
- Triple J
