= Rosewood Almanac =

Studio album by Will Stratton
- Released: May 12, 2017
- Length: 33:47
- Label: Bella Union

Will Stratton chronology
Gray Lodge Wisdom (2014)	Rosewood Almanac (2017)

Professional ratings
Aggregate scores
Source	Rating
Metacritic	74/100
Review scores
Source	Rating
AllMusic	4/5 stars
Clash	8/10
Pitchfork	7/10

Rosewood Almanac is the sixth studio album by American singer-songwriter Will Stratton. It was released on May 12, 2017 through Bella Union.

== Track listing ==
No.	Title	Length
1.	"Light Blue"	4:06
2.	"Thick Skin"	3:06
3.	"Manzanita"	3:45
4.	"Vanishing Class"	4:10
5.	"Whatever's Divine"	2:48
6.	"I See You"	4:14
7.	"Some Ride"	3:00
8.	"Skating on the Glass"	2:07
9.	"This Is What We Do"	3:22
10.	"Ribbons"	3:09
