= David Garland (musician) =

American singer-songwriter

- Born: David Garland; December 17, 1954 (age 71)
- Genres: Pop, experimental, instrumental
- Occupations: Musician; composer; arranger; broadcaster; writer; graphic designer; artist
- Instruments: Piano; guitar; voice; clarinet; flute; accordion
- Years active: 1976–present
- Labels: Review Records, Family Vineyard
- Website: http://davidgarland.com

David Garland (born December 17, 1954) is an American singer-songwriter, composer, instrument designer, illustrator, graphic designer, journalist, and former New York city radio personality.

== Early life and education ==
Garland attended the Rhode Island School of Design from 1972-1976, and graduated with honors.

== Music projects ==
A multi-instrumentalist and vocalist, Garland has recorded with Christian Marclay, John Zorn, Shelley Hirsch, Ikue Mori, Sufjan Stevens, Arto Lindsay, Sussan Deyhim, Sean Lennon, Guy Klucevsek, Michael Gira, Karen Mantler, Brian Dewan, and Meredith Monk, among others. He has performed at New York City’s Knitting Factory, The Kitchen, and Carnegie Hall, in Europe, on WNYC’s New Sounds and other venues, and has recorded several albums of his music. In 1993 he released an album, I Guess I Just Wasn’t Made For These Times, which features Garland, along with accompanists Ikue Mori and Cinnie Cole, interpreting songs by Brian Wilson of the Beach Boys. His most recent album, Conversations with the Cinnamon Skeleton, released in 2012, features guest appearances by Vashti Bunyan, and Sean Lennon and Charlotte Kemp Muhl of the band Ghost of a Saber Tooth Tiger.

== Radio ==
Garland hosted the radio show Spinning On Air on station WNYC in New York City for 28 years, and served as the weekend evening host on WQXR, New York City. He continues to produce Spinning On Air as an independent podcast. He hosted two additional programs on WQXR, Movies On The Radio, which focused on recorded film scores, and Old School, which focused on early music from the 11th to the 18th centuries. Prior to broadcasting at WQXR and WNYC, Garland hosted programs at WKCR, the radio station of Columbia University, New York.

== Visual arts ==
He has designed album covers for the Improvising Artists record label, and for his own music releases.

== Journalism ==
Garland served as editor, writer, and co-art director for EAR Magazine from 1979 to 1982. He wrote a cover story on composer Philip Glass for the December 1983 issue of Down Beat magazine, and penned liner notes for Brain in a Box: The Science Fiction Collection, issued by Rhino in 2000. He has written a number of pieces for NPR Music, including stories about Van Dyke Parks, Mark David Ashworth, Laura Marling, and Will Stratton, and for the musicians forum Talkhouse

== Discography ==
Albums issued as David Garland

- 1987: Control Songs
- 1993: I Guess I Just Wasn’t Made For These Times: David Garland Performs Brian Wilson
- 1999: Togetherness (Control Songs, Vol. 2)
- 2000: My Vortex Camera (Control Songs, Vol. 3)
- 2004: The Other Side of the Window
- 2006: Reveal
- 2007: The Noise in You
- 2012: Conversations with the Cinnamon Skeleton
- 2018: Verdancy

Albums issued under the band name Garlands (including other family members and outside collaborators)

- 2019: Vulneraries Vol. 1
- 2019: Vulneraries Vol. 2
- 2020: Vulneraries Vol. 3 Mortality
- 2020: Vulneraries Vol. 4
- 2020: Vulneraries Vol. 5
- 2021: Vulneraries Vol. 6
