= Origin =

Origin(s) or The Origin may refer to:

== Arts, entertainment and media ==
=== Comics and manga ===
- Origin (comics), a Wolverine comic book mini-series published by Marvel Comics in 2002
- The Origin (Buffy comic), a 1999 Buffy the Vampire Slayer comic book series
- Origins (Judge Dredd story), a major Judge Dredd storyline running from 2006 through 2007
- Origin (manga), 2016, by Boichi
- Mobile Suit Gundam: The Origin, a 2002 manga by Yoshikazu Yasuhiko
- Wolverine: Origins, a Marvel Comics series
- Atharva – The Origin, a 2022 Indian superhero comic

=== Film ===
- Origin (film), 2023, written and directed by Ava DuVernay
- Origin: Spirits of the Past, a 2006 anime movie also known as Gin-iro no Kami no Agito
- X-Men Origins: Wolverine, a 2009 superhero film, prequel to the X-Men film trilogy
- Out of Darkness (2022 film), originally titled The Origin, a British horror film directed by Andrew Cumming

=== Television ===
- Origin (TV series), 2018 science-fiction TV series
- "Origin" (Angel), a fifth-season episode of Angel
- Origin (Stargate), the religion of the Ori
- "Origin" (Stargate SG-1), a ninth-season episode of Stargate SG-1
- Origins: The Journey of Humankind, a National Geographic TV series
- "The Origin" (Dark), episode 4 of season 3 of the Dark TV series
- "The Origins" (The Amazing World of Gumball), a two-part fourth-season episode of The Amazing World of Gumball

=== Gaming ===
- Origin (service), a video game digital distribution service and platform from Electronic Arts
- Origin Systems, a former video game developer
- Origin, King of the Summon Spirits in Tales of Phantasia and its prequel, Tales of Symphonia
- Origins, spirits attached to The Mystics in Legaia 2: Duel Saga
- Origins Award, presented by the Academy of Adventure Gaming Arts and Design at the Origins Game Fair
- Origins Game Fair, an annual board game event in Columbus, Ohio
- Assassin's Creed Origins, part of the Assassin's Creed franchise
- Batman: Arkham Origins, part of the Batman game franchise
- Dragon Age: Origins, a 2009 role-playing video game and first installment of the Dragon Age series
- F.E.A.R. 2: Project Origin, the sequel to F.E.A.R. by Monolith
- Rayman Origins, a 2011 installment in the Rayman series
- Sonic Origins, a 2022 video game collection in the Sonic the Hedgehog series
- Silent Hill: Origins, the fifth installment of the Silent Hill survival horror series and prequel to the original 1999 game
- Origins, the final zombies map released for Call of Duty: Black Ops 2
- Origin, the final dungeon of Xenoblade Chronicles 3

=== Literature ===
==== Fiction ====
- Origin (Baxter novel), a 2001 science fiction book by Stephen Baxter
- Origin (Brown novel), 2017, by Dan Brown, the fifth installment in the Robert Langdon series
- Origin, a 2007 novel by Diana Abu-Jaber
- Origins, a fantasy novel in the Fourth World series by Kate Thompson
- The Origin (novel), a biographical novel of Charles Darwin by Irving Stone

==== Nonfiction ====
- Origins (Cato), Cato the Elder's lost work on Roman and Italian history
- Origins, a book on evolution by Richard Leakey and Roger Lewin

==== Periodicals ====
- Origin (magazine), an American poetry magazine
- Origins, a theological journal published by Catholic News Service (CNS)
- Origins, a peer-reviewed creation science journal of the Geoscience Research Institute (GRI)

=== Music ===
==== Groups ====
- Origin (band), an American metal band formed in 1997
- The Origin (band), an American rock and power pop band 1985–1992
- Origin, a jazz group led by Chick Corea

==== Albums ====
- Origin (Borknagar album), 2006
- Origin (Dayseeker album), 2015
- Origin (Evanescence demo album), 2000
- Origin (Origin album), 2000
- Origin (Omnium Gatherum album), 2021
- Origin (Jordan Rakei album), 2019
- Origin, an EP by Kelly Moran, 2019
- The Origin (album), by The Origin, 1990
- Origins (Bridge to Grace album), 2015
- Origins (Eluveitie album), 2014
- Origins (God Is an Astronaut album), 2013
- Origins (Imagine Dragons album), 2018
- Origins (Dan Reed Network album), by Dan Reed Network, 2018
- Origins, by Steve Roach, 1993
- The Origins, by Ganja White Night, 2018

==== Songs ====
- "Origin", by In Vain from their 2018 album Currents
- "Origin", by Neurosis from their 2007 album Given to the Rising
- "The Origin", by Born of Osiris from their 2013 album Tomorrow We Die Alive
- "The Origin", by Haggard from their 2008 album Tales of Ithiria

==== Other uses in music ====
- The Origin (Einhorn), a 2009 opera/oratorio by Richard Einhorn

== Businesses and organizations ==
- Atos Origin, a company formed by the merger of BSO and Philips C&P (Communications & Processing) division
- Origin Energy, an Australian gas and electricity company
- Origin Enterprises, Irish agribusiness multinational
- Origin PC, a personal computer manufacturer
- Origins (cosmetics), a plant-based skin care and fragrance company of Estée Lauder
- Toyota Origin, a limited edition Toyota automobile released in Japan
- Origin (3D printing), a San Francisco-based 3D printing company acquired by Stratasys

== Philosophy and religion ==
- Creatio ex nihilo, Latin for "creation out of nothing", a phrase used in philosophical and theological contexts
- Creation myth, a symbolic account of how the world began and how people first came to inhabit it
- Origin myth, a story or explanation that describes the beginning of some feature of the natural or social world
- Origin story, or pourquoi story, a fictional narrative that explains why something is the way it is
- Origins, a theological journal published by Catholic News Service (CNS)

== Science, technology and mathematics ==
=== Biology and medicine ===
- Origin (anatomy), the place or point at which a part or structure arises
- Abiogenesis, the study of how life on Earth arose from inanimate matter
- Noogony, the study of the origin of concepts in the mind
- Origin of humanity, the study of human evolution
- Origin of replication, the location at which DNA replication is initiated
- Paleoanthropology, the study of human origin
- Pedigree (dog), registered ancestry

=== Computing and technology ===
- Dalsa Origin, a digital movie camera
- Origin of a URI, as used in the Same-origin policy
- Origin (data analysis software), scientific graphing and data analysis software developed by OriginLab Corp
- Origin OS, a China-only mobile operating system by Vivo
- Original equipment manufacturer (OEM), any company which manufactures products for another company's brand name
- SGI Origin 200, a series of entry-level MIPS-based server computers made by Silicon Graphics
- SGI Origin 2000, a series of mid-range to high-end MIPS-based server computers made by Silicon Graphics
- SGI Origin 3000, a series of mid-range to high-end MIPS-based server computers made by Silicon Graphics that succeeded the Origin 2000
- Origination, a concept in Voice over IP telephony

=== Mathematics ===
- Origin (mathematics), a fixed point of reference for the geometry of the surrounding space
  - Most commonly, the point of intersection of the axes in the Cartesian coordinate system
- Origin, the pole in the polar coordinate system

=== Time ===
- Origin, a general point in time
- Origin, an epochal date or event; see epoch
- Origin, in astronomy, an epochal moment, i.e., a reference for the orbital elements of a celestial body

=== Other uses in science, technology and mathematics ===
- Origin, in cosmogony, any theory concerning the origin of the universe
- Origin, in cosmology, the study of the universe and humanity's place in it

== Sports ==
- International Origin, an annual series of rugby league football matches between England and the Exiles
- City vs Country Origin (1911–2017), an annual Australian rugby league football match
- State of Origin series (often simply "Origin"), an annual best-of-three rugby league series between two Australian state representative sides

== Other uses ==
- Genealogy, the origin of families
- Etymology, the origin of words
- Toponymy, the origin of place names
- Deal origination
- Loan origination

== See also ==
- Begin (disambiguation)
- Creation (disambiguation)
- Origen (disambiguation)
- Original (disambiguation)
- Point of origin (disambiguation)
- Source (disambiguation)
- Start (disambiguation)
