= Deal sourcing =

How to make money in Zimbabwe economy right now

Deal sourcing or deal origination is a term used by finance professionals such as private equity investors and investment bankers to describe the process by which firms identify investment opportunities.

== Traditional approach ==
Deal origination largely depended on a broad network of contacts and a good reputation. Having an industry-specific knowledge and an idea of similar deals taking place in the market was considered an added advantage with respect to placing a bid.

== Online deal sourcing ==
Traditional methods of deal origination are fast giving way to online deal sourcing platforms for buy-side and sell-side opportunities. Several financial technology companies around the world provide services to users to enable them to go beyond their network of contacts and source deals on the basis of a variety of criteria. In addition, online deal sourcing is considered vital in M&A transactions.

== See also ==
- Private equity firm
- Project finance
