= Points of Origin =

Studio album by Will Stratton
- Released: March 7, 2025
- Length: 39:30
- Label: Ruination Record Co.; Bella Union

Will Stratton chronology
The Changing Wilderness (2021)	Points of Origin (2025)

Singles from Points of Origin
- 1. "I Found You" Released: September 12, 2024

Points of Origin is the eighth studio album by Will Stratton. It was released on March 7, 2025, by Ruination Record Co. and Bella Union.

== Background ==
Recorded between 2021 and 2024, Points of Origin centers on the themes of California, climate disaster and generational alienation. Consisting of ten tracks, the album includes lead single, "I Found You", which was released on September 12, 2024.

== Reception ==
Professional ratings
Review scores
Source	Rating
AllMusic	4/5 stars
PopMatters	9/10 stars
MusicOMH	4.5/5 stars
Rolling Stone	3.5/5 stars

In its review of the album, AllMusic stated "Consisting of skillful (mostly) first-person character sketches, the songs seem like intimate Stratton remembrances until the settings crystallize." PopMatters gave it a rating of nine out of ten and remarked "Points of Origin revels in exceptional storytelling and fascinating characters, unfolding not unlike a great short story collection." MusicOMH noted "While early albums incorporated more in the way of personal, introspective material, 2021's The Changing Wilderness began the process of looking further outwards and eighth album Points Of Origin continues this, finding him seeking solace and diversion in the power of storytelling." Rolling Stone Germany rated the album with 3.5 stars out of five.

== Track listing ==
No.	Title	Length
1.	"I Found You"	5:06
2.	"Jesusita"	4:38
3.	"Firewatcher"	4:20
4.	"Temple Bar"	3:26
5.	"Delta Breeze"	3:40
6.	"Red Crossed Star"	3:18
7.	"Bardo Or Heaven"	3:59
8.	"Higher and Drier"	3:58
9.	"Centinela"	2:31
10.	"Slab City"	4:34
Total length:		39:30
