= Original Software =

Privately held company

- Company type: Private
- Industry: Software testing
- Founded: December 1996
- Founder: Colin Armitage
- Products: Qualify, TestDrive, TestAssist, TestBench
- Website: https://originalsoftware.com/

Original Software is a privately held company providing automatic software testing products and services.

== History ==
Original Software was formed in December 1996 and started trading in May 1997. It was founded by Colin Armitage.

In the initial years, Original Software focused on the IBM i platform.

In 2007 a manual testing solution was introduced.

In 2010 it was listed as one of "Twenty companies to watch in 2010" by CIO UK.

Original Software rebranded and launched their new website in 2023.

== Products ==
Original Software's products include:

- Qualify - an Application Quality Management (AQM) solution uniting all aspects of the software development lifecycle
- TestDrive - a test automation and regression testing tool
- TestAssist - a tool for dynamic manual testing and User Acceptance Testing
- TestBench - a test data management and verification tool for IBM i

== Bibliography ==
- Thomas E. Murphy (31 July 2009). "Magic Quadrant for Integrated Software Quality Suites". Gartner. Archived from the original on August 21, 2009.
- Bola Rotibi (14 October 2008). "On the Radar: Original Software". MWD Advisors.
- Bola Rotibi (3 Mar 2010). "Original Software qualifies its role in Application Quality Management with new Qualify tool". MWD Advisors.
- Chandranshu Singh and Michael Azoff (January 2010). "TECHNOLOGY AUDIT Qualify v1.5 Original Software" (PDF). Ovum Butler Group.
