= Amber Broos =

Belgian DJ and music producer

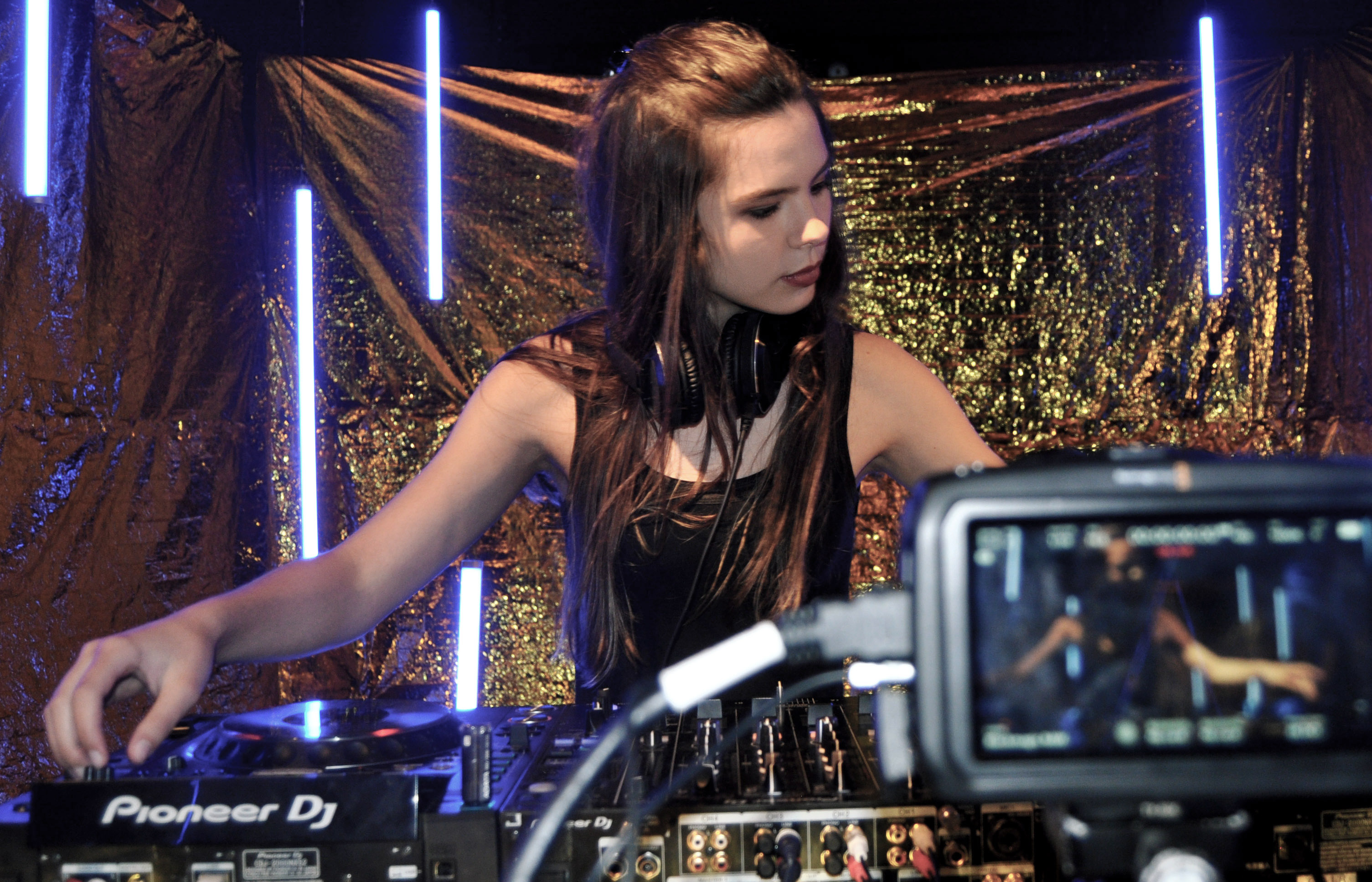
Broos in 2021

Amber Broos (born 2002) is a Belgian DJ.

Broos was born in Leuven. Her father was a DJ and at age 13 she won a competition to be mentored by Robert Abigail.

Broos has featured on Europe's Biggest Dance Show, Eurosonic Noorderslag, and Tomorrowland. She has a monthly show on One World Radio.

Broos has released a number of singles, including "Amok" (2023), "Dance All Night" (2024), and "Whistle" (2024).
