= Atharva – The Origin =

2022 graphic novel

Atharva – The origin
- Date: 18 April 2022; September 2022 (relaunched)
- Page count: 150 pages
- Publisher: Virzu Studios

Creative team
- Writers: Ramesh Thamilmani
- Artists: MS Dhoni
- Creator: Ramesh Thamilmani
- Editor: Kavin Adithya

Atharva – The Origin is a graphic novel written by Ramesh Thamilmani and illustrated by MS Dhoni. It is produced by M.V.M. Vel mohan, Vincent Adaikalaraj and Ashok Manor. Reportedly, the makers are also planning to make a web-series based on the novel.

The novel was touted as India’s first three-dimensional graphic novel with a realistic visual interpretation of about 150 scenes.

== Relaunch as comic ==
The graphic novel was recreated by Pratilipi Comics with "new character designs, artwork, and creative elements, revolutionising the Indian online comic space". In September 2022 the novel was relaunched as comic in Pratilipi comics.
