= FM4 =

Austrian national youth radio station

- Austria

Programming
- Languages: English, German

Ownership
- Owner: ORF

History
- First air date: 16 January 1995; 31 years ago

Links
- Webcast: web stream
- Website: fm4.orf.at

FM4 is an Austrian national radio station operated by the ORF. Its main target is the youth audience, and much of the music output is characterised by an alternative rock and electronic music slant.

== Programming ==
The programming of FM4 is also notable for its high level of spoken word content, much of which is produced in the English language. Morning programmes, including the current affairs-based Reality Check and Update, are broadcast in English while afternoon shows Connected and Homebase are German-speaking. News updates in French were also transmitted twice a day up until 2019 when they were discontinued due to reduced demand.

== History ==
FM4 was launched on 16 January 1995 and initially shared its frequencies with English-language ORF radio station Blue Danube Radio, created principally for the United Nations community at UNO City in Vienna. From its launch in 1995 until 31 January 2000 FM4 was only on-air during evenings and night times from 7pm-6am. Since 1 February 2000 FM4 has broadcast its programmes 24/7, when the station was merged with Blue Danube Radio (resulting in the English programmes being broadcast today).

At launch, FM4 was known as an underground radio station, but full-time broadcasting has increased its popularity and listening figures considerably. It describes its format as alternative mainstream. As well as increasing popularity in Austria itself, a growing number of listeners are tuning in outside the country, most notably in the German state of Bavaria. In 2005, FM4 held its first music festival outside Austria, in Munich.

The website is an essential part of the FM4 concept. Selected web hosts such as Boris Jordan, Johannes Grenzfurthner and Hans Wu post reports, articles or essays about various topics.

In 2001, FM4 teamed up with concert promoter Musicnet to create the FM4 Frequency Festival. This has become the biggest alternative music festival in Austria, and predominantly features artists and bands who appear on the FM4 playlist.

On 26 October 2001 the FM4 Soundpark was launched, creating an online platform on which young musicians can publish their work for free to reach FM4's audience.

FM4's programme director is Doroteja Gradištanac. The most famous voice of FM4 is former Blue Danube Radio host Joe Remick.

FM4 has released a number of compilation albums under its Sound Selection and Sunny Side Up brands, as well as a DVD (FM4 - The Early Years), which was produced to mark the station's 10th anniversary in 2005.

== Reception ==
State	Transmitter - city - frequency
Burgenland	Rechnitz - Hirschenstein: 97,4
Carinthia	Klagenfurt - Dobratsch: 102,9; Wolfsberg - Koralpe: 102,3; Spittal an der Drau - Goldeck: 103,6
Lower Austria	St.Pölten - Jauerling: 98,8; Semmering - Sonnwendstein: 92,4; Weitra - Wachberg: 101,4
Upper Austria	Linz 1 - Lichtenberg: 104,0; Linz 2 - Freinberg: 102,0; Bad Ischl - Katrin: 105,1
Salzburg	Salzburg - Gaisberg: 104,6; Lend - Luxkogel: 97,7
Styria	Graz - Schöckl: 101,7; Schladming - Hauser Kaibling: 103,3; Bruck an der Mur - Mugel: 102,1
Tyrol	Innsbruck 1 - Patscherkofel: 101,4; Innsbruck 2 - Seegrube: 102,5; Landeck-Krahberg: 98,4; Lienz - Rauchkofel: 101,0; Kufstein - Kitzbühler Horn: 99,9
Vorarlberg	Bregenz - Pfänder: 102,1; Feldkirch - Vorderälpele: 102,8
Vienna	Wien 1 - Kahlenberg: 103,8; Wien 1 - Himmelhof: 91,0

FM4 can be received worldwide by Livestreams as Internet radio:

- Official stream on the FM4-Website (Formats: MP3)

In Europe FM4 can be received digitally over the Astra satellites at Astra 19.2°E:

- Satellite: Astra 1H
- Transponder: 115
- Downlink frequency: 12,66275 GHz
- Symbol rate (MS/s): 22
- Error protection (FEC): 5/6
- Polarisation: Horizontal

== See also ==
- List of radio stations in Austria
