= YleX =

Programming
- Language: Finnish
- Format: Music and culture

Ownership
- Owner: Yleisradio

History
- First air date: 2003

Links
- Website: YleX

YleX (formerly known as YLEX) is one of the major radio stations of the Finnish Broadcasting Company (Yle) featuring pop music and cultural programming. The station started as Radiomafia, and name changed to YleX in 2003. Programming targets the younger age group (17 to 27, or variously 15 to 34) as its audience and has attained around 7% listenership in Finland according to a survey in June to August 2013.

== Frequencies ==
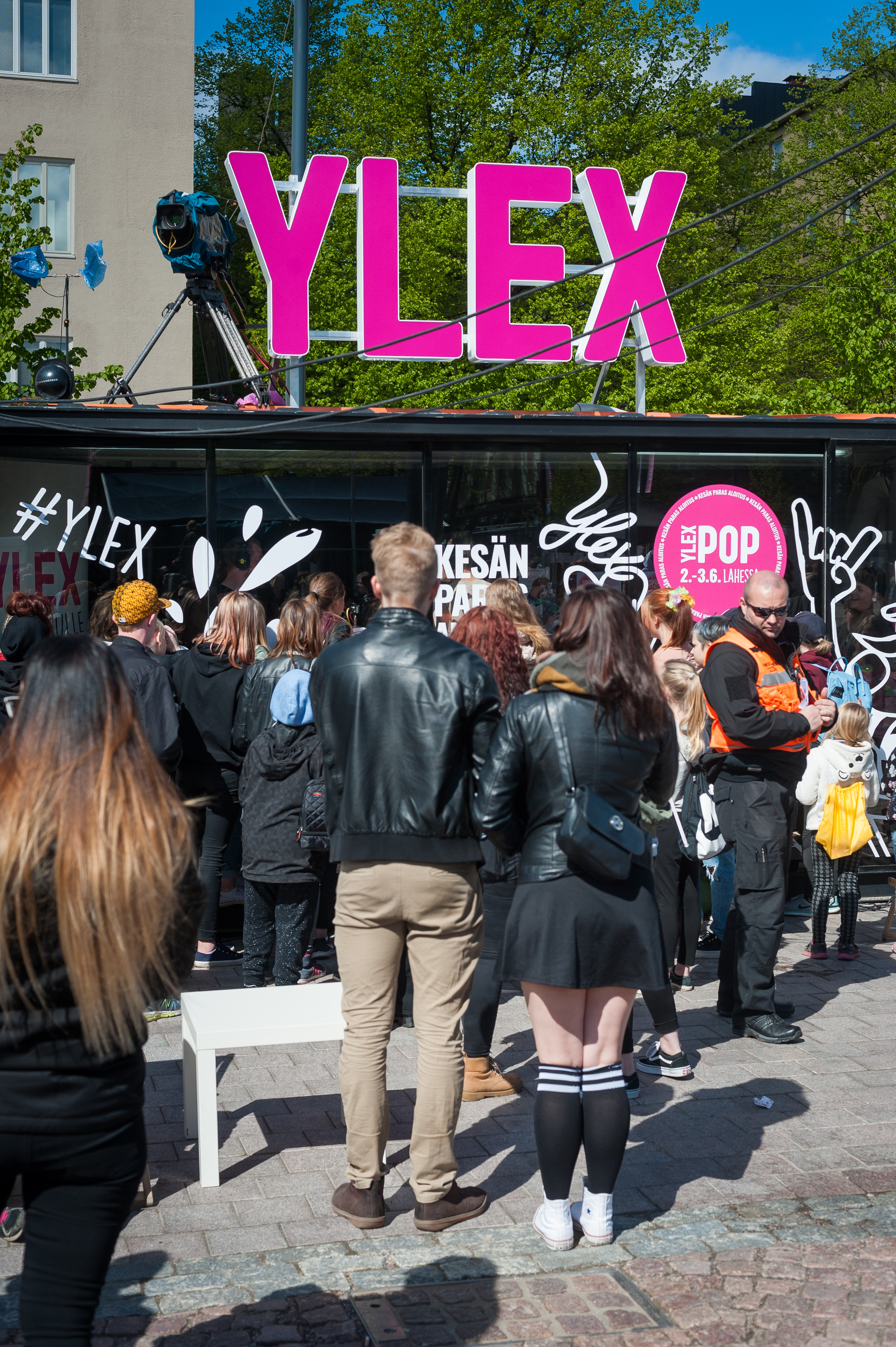
YleXPop Broadcasting container

- Helsinki - 91.9 MHz
- Turku - 92.6 MHz
- Tampere - 93.7 MHz
- Jyväskylä - 87.6 MHz
- Joensuu - 94.9 MHz
- Vaasa - 89.6 MHz
- Oulu - 93.2 MHz
- Rovaniemi - 94.0 MHz
- Inari - 92.8 MHz
- Seinäjoki - 90.1 MHz
