= Studio Brussel =

Radio station in Belgium

- Belgium
- Broadcast area: Belgium; Netherlands (Zeelandic Flanders, North Brabant, Limburg); France (French Flanders)

Programming
- Language: Dutch

Ownership
- Owner: VRT
- Sister stations: Radio 1 Radio 2 Klara; MNM

History
- First air date: 1 April 1983

Links
- Website: studiobrussel.be

Studio Brussel is a Dutch-speaking radio station in Belgium, owned by the VRT. The channel is an initiative of the Flemish Government and is financed principally by taxes.

== History ==
Studio Brussel started on 1 April 1983 as a regional Brussels radio station of the then-BRT. It began as a regional radio station broadcasting only during rush hour. Gradually, broadcasting times were expanded and Studio Brussel could be heard throughout all of Flanders. The first two presenters were Paul De Wyngaert and Jan Hautekiet. The radio station plays mostly alternative and more heavy music, mostly rock, but also metal, hip hop, house and techno.

At the end of 2002, Studio Brussel got a new look. The logo with the "wild" characters was replaced by a red ellipse with the name Studio Brussel in it.

On 24 April 2006, Wim Oosterlinck left Studio Brussel for Qmusic. Peter Van de Veire left Studio Brussel for the new radio station MNM in 2008.

Since 2007, Jan Van Biesen is the net manager of Studio Brussel. He was preceded by Isabelle Baele (2005–2007), Mark Coenen (2002–2005), Jan Hautekiet (1998–2002) and Jan Schoukens (1983–1998).

Studio Brussel has a market share of 9.8% in Flanders. It is also the most popular foreign radio station in the Netherlands.

On 4 February 2019, Studio Brussel introduced a new logo for the first time since 2002. It was designed by Base Design and the new "digital-first" inspired logo uses a custom font as well as an unlimited range of colours.

== Timeless 100 ==
Every year, there is a chart called the Tijdloze 100 (timeless 100), with 100 timeless tracks. It consists of 100 'timeless tracks'. In 2003, 2004 and 2005 the Belgian band Gorki was at the first place with "Mia". In 2006 until 2012, Nirvana was at number 1 with "Smells Like Teen Spirit". Thereafter, Led Zeppelin (Stairway to heaven), and Pearl Jam (Black) took the top-position. In 2021 Fleetwood Mac overtook Black with The Chain.

== Frequencies ==
=== FM ===
Region	Frequency
Leuven	88.0 MHz
Ghent	94.5 MHz
Flemish Brabant	100.6 MHz
(Antwerp Province) Antwerp, North Brabant (NL)	100.9 MHz
(Limburg (Belgium)) Limburg	101.4 MHz
West Flanders, Nord-Pas-de-Calais (F)	102.1 MHz
East Flanders	102.1 MHz

=== DAB ===
Region	Frequency
Flanders	VRT Channel 12A (223,936 MHz)

=== DVB-T ===
Region	Frequency
(Antwerp Province) Antwerp	Channel 25 (506 MHz)
Flemish Brabant	Channel 22 (482 MHz)
(Limburg (Belgium)) Limburg	Channel 25 (506 MHz)
West Flanders	Channel 22 (482 MHz)
East Flanders	Channel 22 (482 MHz)

== Logos ==
1998 to 2002

Used from 2003 to February 3, 2019

Used since February 4, 2019 till November 11, 2023

== See also ==
- Vlaamse Radio- en Televisieomroeporganisatie (VRT)
