= Greatest Hits Radio Midlands =

British radio station

- Birmingham; England
- Broadcast area: West Midlands; East Midlands; South Cheshire; Rutland; Stamford
- Frequencies: FM: 96.4 MHz (Congleton); 96.7 MHz (Ashbourne); 96.9 MHz (Stafford); 97.4 MHz (Stamford); 101.8 MHz (Uttoxeter); 102.0 MHz (Matlock); 103.3 MHz (Hope Valley and Whaley Bridge); 105.2 MHz (Birmingham and West Midlands); 106.0 MHz (East Midlands); 106.4 MHz (Buxton); 106.5 MHz (Shrewsbury); 106.6 MHz (Chapel-en-le-Frith); 107.1 MHz (Oswestry); 107.2 MHz (Kidderminster); 107.2 MHz (Oakham); 107.4 MHz (Telford); 107.7 MHz (Wolverhampton); DAB: 8B (High Peak); 10B (Derbyshire); 11B (Leicestershire); 11B (Wolverhampton, Shrewsbury and Telford); 11C (Birmingham, South Staffordshire, Bromsgrove, Lickey and Redditch); 12A (Herefordshire and Worcestershire); 12C (Nottinghamshire); 12D (Staffordshire and Cheshire); 12D (Coventry and Warwickshire); 12D (Peterborough)
- RDS: GRT HITS
- Branding: The Good Times Sound Like This; Across TSA

Programming
- Format: Classic Hits
- Network: Greatest Hits Radio

Ownership
- Owner: Bauer

History
- First air date: 1 September 2020
- Former frequencies: 990 MW; 1017 MW; 1152 MW; 1170 MW; 1359 MW

Links
- Website: GHR Birmingham & The West Midlands; GHR East Midlands; GHR Black Country & Shropshire; GHR Coventry & Warwickshire; GHR Herefordshire & Worcestershire; GHR Peterborough, Stamford & Rutland; GHR Staffordshire & Cheshire; GHR Derbyshire

Greatest Hits Radio Midlands is a regional radio station serving the East & West Midlands as part of Bauer’s Greatest Hits Radio network.

== Localised variants ==
The station has seven variants:

- Birmingham & The West Midlands (formerly Greatest Hits Radio West Midlands)
- Black Country & Shropshire (formerly Signal 107)
- Coventry & Warwickshire (formerly Free Radio 80s C&W; DAB only)
- Derbyshire, Nottinghamshire & Leicestershire (DAB & FM only)
- Herefordshire & Worcestershire (formerly Signal 107 (Kidderminster) & Free Radio 80s H&W)
- Staffordshire & Cheshire (DAB & FM only formerly Signal 2)
- Peterborough, Stamford & Rutland (formerly Rutland Radio and Kiss 105-108) - (DAB & FM only)

== History ==
Under relaxed OFCOM requirements for local content on commercial radio, Greatest Hits Radio Midlands is permitted to share all programmes between seven licences located in the ITV Central region.

Previously, these licences broadcast as separate stations:

- Signal Radio began broadcasting to Stoke-on-Trent and surrounding areas in September 1983. It later expanded its coverage area to South Cheshire in 1989 and Stafford a year later.
- 107.7 The Wolf began broadcasting to Wolverhampton and surrounding areas in October 1997.
- Rutland Radio began broadcasting to the Rutland and Stamford areas in December 1998.
- Telford FM began broadcasting to Telford and surrounding areas in May 1999.
- Kerrang! Radio began broadcasting a specialist rock music service to the West Midlands in June 2004.
- The Wyre began broadcasting to the Kidderminster and Bromsgrove areas in September 2005.
- The Severn launched separate services for Shrewsbury and Oswestry in September 2006.
- Signal 1 launched separate services for Congleton and Stafford in 1989 and 1990.
- High Peak Radio began broadcasting to the Peak District in April 2004.
- Gem launched a separate service for the East Midlands in 1997 as Radio 106 FM and Century 106.

Signal Radio began carrying split programming on AM in 1992, initially airing a 'Golden Breakfast Show' on weekdays before expanding into a full-time sister station, Signal Gold (later Signal 2) in January 1993.

Telford FM, The Severn and The Wyre - all under the ownership of the Midlands News Association - initially ran separate services but gradually shared most programming outside Breakfast and local news. In 2010, Telford FM merged with The Severn and began sharing all output. The stations were earmarked for closure in November 2011 unless a buyer could be found.

In February 2012, MNA sold its radio assets to UTV Media, which also owned Signal Radio since 2005. The following month, The Severn and The Wyre merged with 107.7 The Wolf to form a new regional station, Signal 107. UTV sold off its radio assets - including the three Signal-branded stations - to News Corp (Wireless Group) in September 2016.

In June 2013, Kerrang! Radio ceased broadcasting on FM in the West Midlands and was replaced by a similar classic rock service, Planet Rock, following its sale to Bauer. In September 2015, the 105.2 FM frequency was taken over again by Absolute Radio.

In January 2019, Bauer launched Greatest Hits Radio launched in the West Midlands, replacing Absolute Radio on 105.2 FM. Local programming returned with the launch of a weekday Drivetime show.

In February 2019, Bauer Radio brought the Lincs FM Group and the Wireless Group's network of local radio stations, although these sales was only ratified in March 2020 following an inquiry by the Competition and Markets Authority.

In May 2020, Bauer announced Rutland Radio and the Wireless Group stations would rebrand and join the Greatest Hits Radio network. Two months later, Signal 107 and Signal 2 entered a transition period - carrying local breakfast shows and voicetracked programming ahead of the full relaunch on 1 September 2020. The former Wireless Group studios in Wolverhampton and Rutland Radio's studios in Oakham were closed. Local newsgathering and sales staff were retained.

On 23 November 2021, Bauer announced it would move Greatest Hits Radio's Midlands operation from its Brindleyplace studios in Birmingham city centre to a smaller facility at 54 Hagley Road in Edgbaston at the end of 2021.

== Programming ==
Networked late night shows presented by Alex Lester and weekend breakfast shows are produced from Bauer's Birmingham studios.

On weekdays, the station airs a regional three-hour afternoon show from 1-4pm, presented by Andy Goulding.

=== News ===
Bauer's Birmingham newsroom broadcasts local news bulletins hourly from 6am to 7pm on weekdays and from 7am to 1pm at weekends. Headlines are broadcast on the half-hour during weekday breakfast and drivetime shows, alongside traffic bulletins. Separate bulletins are produced for the five licence areas.

National bulletins from Sky News Radio are carried at other times.
