= North Shropshire Chronicle =

- Type: Weekly regional newspaper
- Owner: Midland News Association
- Editor: Mary Queally
- Headquarters: North Shropshire Chronicle, 13-14 Abbey Foregate, Shrewsbury, SY2 6AE
- Price: £
- Sister newspapers: Shrewsbury Chronicle
- Website: northshropshirechronicle.com

The North Shropshire Chronicle is no longer printed. It was a local weekly newspaper covering northern Shropshire in England, including Wem, Whitchurch, Ellesmere and many surrounding villages.

The North Shropshire Chronicle had been an edition of the Shrewsbury Chronicle for many years but it did not have its own totally separate front and news pages until 1999. It was printed on Wednesday evening and was on sale or distributed on Thursday.

== See also ==
- Shrewsbury Chronicle
- Shropshire Star
- Express & Star
- Midland News Association
