= Signal 107 =

Coordinates: 52.5850°N 2.1285°W

- Wolverhampton; England
- Broadcast area: Wolverhampton, North and Central Shropshire, North Worcestershire
- Frequencies: FM: 106.5 MHz; 107.1 MHz; 107.2 MHz; 107.4 MHz; 107.7 MHz
- RDS: Sig 107

Programming
- Format: Hot Adult Contemporary

Ownership
- Owner: Bauer Radio

History
- First air date: 26 March 2012
- Last air date: 1 September 2020

Links
- Website: www.signal107.co.uk

Signal 107 was a British Independent Local Radio station serving Wolverhampton and surrounding areas, Telford and Wrekin, Shrewsbury, Oswestry in north and central Shropshire and Kidderminster, Stourport-on-Severn and Bewdley in north Worcestershire. The station, owned and operated by Bauer Radio, launched on Monday 26 March 2012 as a result of the merger of three stations – The Wolf, The Severn (previously known in Telford as Telford FM) and The Wyre.

== History ==
Signal 107 originally broadcast as four stations – The Wolf began broadcasting to Wolverhampton and the surrounding areas from its Mander House studios in the city on 7 October 1997 while Telford FM launched in the Telford and Wrekin area on 3 May 1999. The Wyre started broadcasts in Kidderminster, Bewdley, Stourport-on-Severn, Stourbridge and Bromsgrove on 12 September 2005, followed by The Severn in Shrewsbury and Oswestry on 18 September 2006, initially providing separate programming services for north and central Shropshire.

Telford FM, The Wyre and The Severn were owned and operated by the Midlands News Association. The three stations were co-located at Telford FM's studios in 2009 following permission from OFCOM. On 20 September 2010, the Telford station was rebranded as The Severn and allowed to share all programming with the Shrewsbury/Oswestry station. In November 2011, the station's owners announced that the stations would be closed unless a buyer could be found.

On 3 February 2012, The Wyre and The Severn were both acquired by UTV Media, which had owned The Wolf since a buyout from The Wireless Group in mid-2005. Live programming ended on the same day on both former MNA stations. All three stations merged and rebranded as Signal 107 at midday on Monday 26 March 2012.

On 8 February 2019, Signal 107 was bought by Bauer Radio alongside the other local Wireless Group stations.

On 27 May 2020, it was announced that Signal 107 will close and be replaced by a national station Greatest Hits Radio. On 1 September 2020, Signal 107 was replaced by Greatest Hits Radio Midlands.

== Programming ==
Local programming was produced and broadcast from Signal 107's Wolverhampton studios from 6 am-7 pm on weekdays, 6 am-6 pm on Saturdays and 8 am-12 midday on Sundays. Networked programming originates from Wireless Group's Signal Radio studios in Stoke-on-Trent. Signal 107 did have the option to opt-out of networked programmes for local content if deemed appropriate.

The station's local presenters were Dicky Dodd (Weekday Breakfast), Tim Haycock (Weekday and Saturday Daytime), Steve Mason (The Home Run).

Signal 107 opted in to networked programming from Signal 1's studios in Stoke-on-Trent – Total Access and The Spence Macdonald Late Show (Monday to Friday), Mylo's Saturday Night House Party (Saturday) and Sam Harper's late show (Saturday and Sunday night), The Total Access Top 40 (Sunday) and Old Skool Anthems (Sunday).

=== News and sport ===
Signal 107 broadcast local news bulletins hourly from 6 am to 6 am on weekdays, from 7 am to 1 pm on Saturdays and from 8 am to 12 midday on Sundays. Headlines were broadcast on the half-hour during weekday breakfast and drivetime shows. The station also simulcasted hourly Sky News Radio bulletins at all other times.

Beginning with the 2015–16 season, Signal 107 broadcast live football commentaries of Wolverhampton Wanderers F.C. league and league cup matches. Match coverage aired on all of their FM transmitters. Coverage was presented by Steve Mason, with commentary from Mikey Burrows and Andy Thompson.

== Outside Broadcasting and Events ==
Signal 107 regularly broadcast live from various locations across the TSA. It had a purpose built roadshow/outside broadcast unit which was a self-contained stage and PA system on board.
