= Hillsborough disaster =

Fatal crowd crush during 1989 FA Cup semi-final

- The Leppings Lane end inside Hillsborough Stadium during the disaster (goalposts centre)

- Hillsborough disaster (Sheffield)
- Date: 15 April 1989; 37 years ago
- Time: 14:00–16:10 GMT
- Venue: Hillsborough Stadium
- Location: Sheffield, South Yorkshire, England; 53.4115°N 1.5016°W
- Type: Human crush
- Cause: Overcrowding in central pens of stand as a result of grossly negligent policing
- Deaths: 97
- Injuries: 766
- Inquiries: Taylor Report (1990); Hillsborough Independent Panel (2012)
- Inquest: Stefan Popper (1st inquest, 1989–1991); Sir John Goldring (2nd inquest, 2014–2016)

The Hillsborough disaster was a fatal crowd crush at a football match at Hillsborough Stadium in Sheffield, South Yorkshire, England, on 15 April 1989. It occurred during an FA Cup semi-final between Liverpool and Nottingham Forest in the two standing-only central pens within the Leppings Lane stand allocated to Liverpool supporters. Shortly before kick-off, police match commander David Duckenfield ordered exit gate C to be opened in an attempt to ease crowding, which led to an influx of supporters entering the pens. This resulted in overcrowding of those pens and the fatal crush; with a total of 97 fatalities and 766 injuries, the disaster is the deadliest in British sporting history. Ninety-four people died on the day; one more died in hospital days later, and two more suffered irreversible brain damage on the day and died in 1993 and 2021 respectively. The match was abandoned and replayed at Old Trafford in Manchester on 7 May 1989; Liverpool won and went on to win that season's FA Cup.

In the following days and weeks, South Yorkshire Police (SYP) fed the press false stories suggesting that football hooliganism and drunkenness by Liverpool supporters had caused the disaster. Blaming Liverpool fans persisted even after the Taylor Report of 1990, which found that the main cause was a failure of crowd control by SYP. Following the Taylor Report, the Director of Public Prosecutions ruled there was no evidence to justify prosecution of any individuals or institutions. The disaster led to a number of safety improvements in the largest English football grounds, notably the elimination of fenced standing terraces in favour of all-seater stadiums in the top two tiers of English football.

The first coroner's inquests into the Hillsborough disaster, completed in 1991, concluded with verdicts of "accidental death" in respect of all the deceased. Families disputed the findings, and fought to have the case re-opened. In 1997 Lord Justice Stuart-Smith concluded that there was no justification for a new inquiry. Private prosecutions brought by the Hillsborough Family Support Group against Duckenfield and his deputy Bernard Murray failed in 2000. In 2009 a Hillsborough Independent Panel was formed to review the evidence. Reporting in 2012, it confirmed Taylor's 1990 criticisms and revealed details about the extent of police efforts to shift blame onto fans, the role of other emergency services and the errors of the first coroner's inquests. The panel's report resulted in the previous findings of accidental death being quashed, and the creation of new coroner's inquests. It also produced two criminal investigations led by police in 2012: Operation Resolve to look into the causes of the disaster, and by the Independent Police Complaints Commission (IPCC) to examine actions by police in the aftermath.

The second coroner's inquests were held from 1 April 2014 to 26 April 2016. They ruled that the supporters were unlawfully killed owing to grossly negligent failures by police and ambulance services to fulfil their duty of care. The inquests also found that the design of the stadium contributed to the crush, and that supporters were not to blame for the dangerous conditions. Public anger over the actions of their force during the second inquests led to the suspension of the SYP chief constable, David Crompton, following the verdict. In June 2017, six people were charged with offences including manslaughter by gross negligence, misconduct in public office and perverting the course of justice for their actions during and after the disaster. The Crown Prosecution Service subsequently dropped all charges against one of the defendants.

== Before the disaster ==
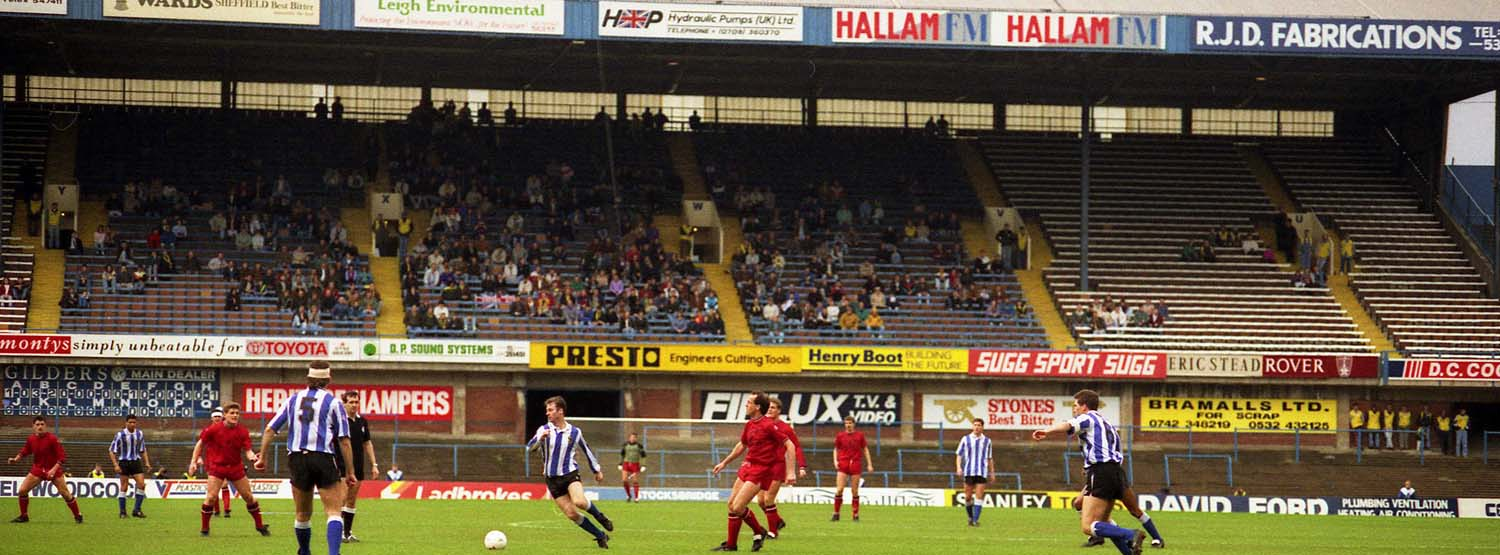
The West Stand of Sheffield Wednesday's Hillsborough Stadium, where the disaster unfolded, seen two years later in 1991

=== Venue ===
Hillsborough Stadium had been constructed in 1899 to house Sheffield Wednesday. It was selected by the Football Association (FA) as a neutral venue to host the FA Cup semi-final between Liverpool and Nottingham Forest Football Clubs. Kick-off was scheduled for 3:00 pm on 15 April 1989, and fans were advised to take up positions 15 minutes beforehand.

At the time of the disaster most English football stadiums had high steel fencing between the spectators and the playing field in response to pitch invasions. Hooliganism had affected the sport for some years and was particularly virulent in England. Since 1974, when these security standards were put in place, crushes had occurred in several English stadiums.

A report by Eastwood & Partners for a safety certificate for the stadium in 1978 concluded that although it failed to meet the recommendations of the Green Guide, a guide to safety at sports grounds, the consequences were minor. It emphasised the general situation at Hillsborough was satisfactory compared with most grounds. Sheffield Wednesday were later criticised for neglecting safety in the stadium, especially after an incident in the semi-final of the 1981 FA Cup. The Leppings Lane end of the ground did not hold a valid safety certificate at the time of the disaster; it had not been updated since 1979.

Risks associated with confining fans in pens were highlighted by the Committee of Inquiry into Crowd Safety at Sports Grounds (the Popplewell inquiry) after the Bradford City stadium fire in May 1985. It made recommendations on the safety of crowds penned within fences, including that "all exit gates should be manned at all times ... and capable of being opened immediately from the inside by anyone in an emergency".

==== Previous incidents ====
Hillsborough hosted five FA Cup semi-finals in the 1980s. During the 1981 semi-final between Tottenham Hotspur and Wolverhampton Wanderers, a crush occurred at the Leppings Lane end of the ground after hundreds more spectators were permitted to enter the terrace than could safely be accommodated, resulting in 38 injuries, including broken arms, legs and ribs. Police believed there would have been a real chance of fatalities had swift action not been taken, and recommended that the club reduce its capacity. In a post-match briefing to discuss the incident, Sheffield Wednesday chairman Bert McGee remarked: "Bollocks— no one would have been killed". (Note: McGee would resign from his position as chairman soon after the disaster, to be replaced by Dave Richards.) The incident nonetheless prompted Sheffield Wednesday to alter the layout at the Leppings Lane end, dividing the terrace into three separate pens to restrict sideways movement. This particular change, and other later alterations to the stadium, invalidated the stadium's safety certificate which was not renewed, and the stated capacity of the stadium was never changed. The terrace was divided into five pens when the club was promoted to the First Division in 1984, and a crush barrier near the access tunnel was removed in 1986 to improve the flow of fans entering and exiting the central enclosure.

After the crush in 1981, Hillsborough was not selected to host an FA Cup semi-final again until 1987. Significant overcrowding was observed at the ground during that year's quarter-final between Sheffield Wednesday and Coventry City, and again during the semi-final between Coventry City and Leeds United. The Leeds fans were assigned the Leppings Lane end for the semi-final; one fan described disorganisation at the turnstiles and no steward or police direction inside the stadium, resulting in the crowd in one enclosure becoming so compressed that he was at times unable to raise and clap his hands. Other accounts told of fans having to be pulled to safety from above.

Liverpool and Nottingham Forest met in the semi-final at Hillsborough in 1988, and fans again reported crushing at the Leppings Lane end. Liverpool lodged a complaint before the match in 1989. One supporter wrote to the Football Association and the Minister for Sport: "The whole area was packed solid to the point where it was impossible to move and where I, and others around me, felt considerable concern for personal safety."

=== South Yorkshire Police command changes ===
South Yorkshire Police (SYP) presence at the previous year's FA Cup semi-final (also between Liverpool and Nottingham Forest and also at Hillsborough Stadium) had been overseen by Chief Superintendent Brian L. Mole. Mole had supervised numerous police deployments at the stadium. In October 1988 a probationary PC in Mole's F division, South Yorkshire was handcuffed, stripped and photographed, by fellow officers in a fake robbery, as an initiation prank. Four officers had to resign and seven were disciplined over the incident and Mole was transferred to the Barnsley division for "career development reasons". The transfer was done with immediate effect on 27 March 1989.

Meanwhile, Hillsborough was accepted as the FA Cup semi-final venue on 20 March 1989 by the Football Association. The first planning meeting for the semi-final took place on 22 March and was attended by newly promoted Chief Superintendent David Duckenfield, not by Mole. No known minutes exist of this meeting. Although Mole could have been assigned the semi-final match's planning despite his transfer, that was not done. This left planning for the semi-final match to Duckenfield, who had never commanded a sell-out football match before, and who had "very little, if any" training or personal experience in how to do so.

== Disaster ==
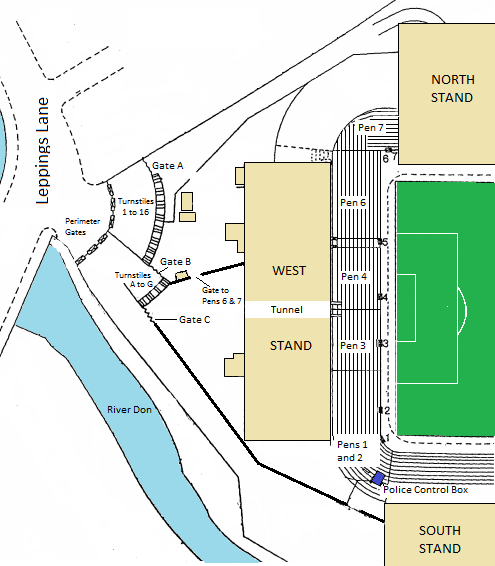
Leppings Lane was the sole access point for Liverpool fans. The approach has been described as a "bottleneck" from which two sides of the stadium were being filled.

=== Access to the stadium ===
As is common practice at domestic football matches in England, opposing supporters were segregated in and around the stadium. Nottingham Forest were allocated the South Stand and Spion Kop, (Note: Several British stadiums have a stand called "Spion Kop" or "The Kop". The name, originally that of a hill in South Africa, usually refers to an unusually steep stand.) with a combined capacity of 29,800 spectators, reached by 60 turnstiles spaced along the south and east sides of the ground. Liverpool were allocated the North Stand and West Stand, with a combined capacity of 24,256 spectators, reached by 23 turnstiles from a narrow concourse off Leppings Lane. Ten turnstiles (numbered 1 to 10) provided access to 9,700 seats in the North Stand, six turnstiles (numbered 11 to 16) provided access to 4,456 seats in the upper tier of the West Stand, and a further seven turnstiles (lettered A to G) gave access to 10,100 standing places in the lower tier of the West Stand. Although a greater number of Liverpool supporters were expected to attend the match, Forest had been allocated the larger spectator area, to avoid the approach routes of rival fans crossing. As a result of the stadium layout and the segregation policy, the additional turnstiles that would normally have allowed access to the North Stand from the east were not being used, and the Liverpool fans were forced to converge on the single entrance at Leppings Lane. On the day of the match, radio and television broadcasters were advising anyone without a ticket not to attend. Rather than establishing crowd safety as their top priority, the clubs, local authorities and police viewed their roles and responsibilities through the 'lens of hooliganism'.

=== Build-up ===
The scene outside the ground as the disaster began

Three chartered trains had transported Liverpool supporters to Sheffield for the 1988 semi-final, but only one such train was provided in 1989. The 350 passengers arrived at the ground at about 2:20 pm. Many of the supporters wished to enjoy the day and were in no hurry to enter the stadium too early. Some were delayed by roadworks while crossing the Pennines on the M62 motorway which resulted in minor traffic congestion. Between 2:30 pm and 2:40 pm, there was a build-up of supporters outside the turnstiles facing Leppings Lane, eager to enter the stadium before the game started. At 2:46 pm, the BBC's football commentator John Motson had already noticed the uneven distribution of people in the Leppings Lane pens, and while rehearsing for the match off-air he had suggested a nearby cameraman look as well. "There's gaps, you know, in parts of the ground. Well, if you look at the Liverpool end, to the right of the goal, there's hardly anybody on those steps... that's it. Look down there."

A bottleneck developed outside the stadium, with more fans arriving than could be safely filtered through the turnstiles before the 3:00 pm kick-off. People presenting tickets at the wrong turnstiles, and those who had been refused entry, were blocked from leaving because of the crowd behind them and remained as an obstruction. Fans outside the ground could hear cheering as the teams came onto the pitch ten minutes before the start of the match, and as the match kicked off, but could not gain entrance. A police constable radioed control requesting that the game be delayed, as had happened in 1987, to ensure the safe passage of supporters into the ground, but the request to delay the kick-off by 20 minutes was declined.

By this time, an estimated 5,000 fans were trying to enter through the turnstiles. Amid increasing safety concerns, and to avoid fatalities outside the ground, the police opened a large exit gate (Gate C) that ordinarily permitted the free flow of supporters departing the stadium after a match. Two more gates (A and B) were subsequently opened to further relieve the pressure. After an initial rush, thousands of supporters entered the stadium "steadily at a fast walk".

=== Crush ===
Liverpool supporters try desperately to climb the fence to reach the safety of the pitch while being stopped by the police.

When the gates were opened, thousands of fans entered a narrow tunnel leading from the rear of the terrace into two overcrowded central pens (pens 3 and 4), creating pressure at the front. Hundreds of people were pressed against one another and the fencing by the weight of the crowd behind them. People entering were unaware of the problems at the front of the pens; police or stewards would normally stand at the entrance to the tunnel and, if the central pens reached capacity, they would direct people to the side pens, but that did not happen on this occasion, for reasons not fully explained.

The match between Liverpool and Nottingham Forest started at 3:00 pm, as scheduled. Fans were still streaming into pens 3 and 4 from the rear entrance tunnel as the match began. For some time, problems at the front of the Liverpool central goal pens went largely unnoticed except by those inside the pens and a few police at that end of the pitch. Liverpool's goalkeeper Bruce Grobbelaar later reported that fans behind him were pleading to him for help as the situation worsened. At first, the police made attempts to stop people from spilling out of the pens, some believing this to be a pitch invasion. At approximately 3:04 pm, a shot from Liverpool's Peter Beardsley hit the crossbar; possibly connected to the excitement, a surge in pen 3 caused one of its metal crush barriers to give way.

Police superintendent Roger Greenwood (the most senior SYP officer in command inside the ground on the day) realised the situation, and ran onto the field to gain the attention of referee Ray Lewis, who stopped the match at 3:05:30. At this point, people were climbing the fence at the front of the pens in an effort to escape the crush and get to the pitchside. A small gate in the fence had been forced open and some fans managed to escape via this route, while others continued to climb over the fencing. Some were pulled to safety by people at the front of the upper tier of the West Stand above the Leppings Lane terrace. The intensity of the crush broke more crush barriers on the terrace. Holes were made in the perimeter fencing by fans desperately attempting to rescue others.

The crowd in the Leppings Lane terrace spilled onto the pitch, where the many injured and traumatised fans who had climbed to safety congregated. The football players were ushered to their dressing rooms and informed that there would be a 30-minute postponement. The people still trapped in the pens were packed so tightly that many victims died of compressive asphyxia while standing. Meanwhile, on the pitch, police, stewards and members of the St John Ambulance service were overwhelmed. Many uninjured fans were assisting the injured; several attempted CPR and others tore down advertising hoardings to use as makeshift stretchers. SYP chief superintendent John Nesbit later briefed Michael Shersby MP, at a Police Federation meeting in October 1989, that allowing the fans to help with the rescue effort was a deliberate strategy, "otherwise they might have turned their frustration on the police."

==== SYMAS response ====
The agreed protocol for the South Yorkshire Metropolitan Ambulance Service (SYMAS) was that ambulances were to queue at the entrance to the gymnasium under the North Stand, termed the casualty reception point, or CRP. Any individuals within the stadium who were seriously injured were to be delivered expeditiously by police and paramedics to the CRP to receive medical attention. The system of ferrying injured from any location within the stadium to the CRP required a formal declaration to be made by those in charge for it to take effect. As this declaration was not immediately performed, there was confusion among those attempting to administer aid on the pitch. This indecision migrated to the first responders waiting in ambulances at the CRP, which quickly deteriorated into an ambulance car park. Some crews were hesitant to leave their vehicles, unsure of whether patients were coming to them, or vice versa. Others who did leave their vehicles were then faced with the obstacles inherent in placing distance between themselves and their equipment. As the Panel explained in their report:

The equipment was no use on the ambulance vehicle when critical early resuscitation was taking place some distance away on the pitch, behind the Leppings Lane end and in the gymnasium. Some ambulance crew did take equipment when they left their vehicle, but there was no systematic direction to do so, not all did, and none initially had been given any information about the situation inside the stadium.

A total of 42 ambulances arrived at the stadium. Two ambulances managed to make their way onto the pitch of their own accord, and a third entered the field at the direction of deputy chief ambulance officer Alan Hopkins, who felt its visibility might allay crowd concerns. The remaining 39 ambulances were collectively able to transport approximately 149 people to either Northern General Hospital, Royal Hallamshire Hospital, or Barnsley Hospital for treatment.

The adverse comments of two doctors regarding the emergency response appeared in the media. Their views were not "a maverick view from a disaffected minority but the considered opinion of the majority of professionals present from the outset."

=== Reactions ===
Condolences flooded in from across the world, led by Queen Elizabeth II. Other messages came from Pope John Paul II, US president George H. W. Bush, and the chief executive of Juventus (fans of Liverpool and Juventus had been involved in the Heysel Stadium disaster) amongst many others.

Prime Minister Margaret Thatcher and Home Secretary Douglas Hurd visited Hillsborough the day after the disaster and met survivors. Anfield stadium was opened on the Sunday to allow fans to pay tribute to the dead. Thousands of fans visited and the stadium filled with flowers, scarves and other tributes. In the following days more than 200,000 people visited the "shrine" inside the stadium. The following Sunday, a link of football scarves spanning the 1 mile (1.6 km) distance across Stanley Park from Goodison Park to Anfield was created, with the final scarf in position at 3:06 pm. Elsewhere on the same day, a silence – opened with an air-raid siren at three o'clock – was held in central Nottingham with the colours of Forest, Liverpool and Wednesday adorning Nottingham Council House.

At Liverpool Metropolitan Cathedral, a requiem Mass attended by 3,000 people was held by the Catholic Archbishop of Liverpool, Derek Worlock. The first reading was read by Liverpool goalkeeper Bruce Grobbelaar. Liverpool players Ronnie Whelan, Steve Nicol, and former manager Joe Fagan carried the Communion bread and wine.

The FA chief executive Graham Kelly, who had attended the match, said the FA would conduct an inquiry into what had happened. Speaking after the disaster, Kelly backed all-seater stadiums, saying "We must move fans away from the ritual of standing on terraces". Standing on terraces and the use of perimeter fencing around the pitch, the use of CCTV, the timing of football matches and policing of sporting events were factors for a subsequent inquiry to consider.

UEFA President Jacques Georges caused controversy by describing the Liverpool supporters as "beasts", wrongly suggesting that hooliganism was the cause of the disaster, which had occurred less than four years after the Heysel Stadium disaster. His remarks led to Liverpool F.C. calling for his resignation, but he apologised on discovering hooliganism was not the cause.

At the 1989 FA Cup final between Liverpool and local rivals Everton, held just five weeks after the Hillsborough disaster, the players from both participating teams wore black armbands as a gesture of respect to the victims.

During the final match of the 1988–89 Football League season, contested on 26 May 1989 between Liverpool and second-place Arsenal, the Arsenal players presented flowers to fans in different parts of Anfield in memory of those who had died in the Hillsborough disaster.

=== Disaster appeal fund ===
A disaster appeal fund was set up with donations of £500,000 (equivalent to about US$818,000 at the time and $2.1 million currently) from the UK Government, £100,000 (about US$164,000 at the time and $425,000 currently) from Liverpool F.C. and £25,000 (about US$41,000 at the time and $106,000 currently) each from the cities of Liverpool, Sheffield, and Nottingham. The Liverpool F.C. donation was the amount the club would have received (as its share of the match income) had the semi-final gone ahead as planned. Within days, donations had passed £1 million (about US$1.6 million at the time and $4.3 million currently), swelled by donations from individuals, schools and businesses. Other fundraising activities included a Factory Records benefit concert and several fundraising football matches. The two teams involved in the Bradford City stadium fire, Bradford City and Lincoln City, met for the first time since the 1985 disaster in a game that raised £25,000 (about US$41,000 at the time and $106,000 currently) for the Hillsborough fund. By the time the appeal closed in 1990, it had raised more than £12 million (about US$20 million at the time and $51 million currently). Much of the money went to victims and relatives of those involved in the disaster and provided funds for a college course to improve the hospital phase of emergency care.

In May 1989, a charity version of the Gerry and the Pacemakers song "Ferry Cross the Mersey" was released in aid of those affected. The record was produced by Stock Aitken Waterman and featured Liverpool musicians Paul McCartney, Gerry Marsden (of the Pacemakers), Holly Johnson, and The Christians. It entered the UK Singles Chart at number one on 20 May, and remained at the top of the chart for three weeks. Despite having stronger ties to Liverpool F.C., Gerry and the Pacemakers' earlier hit "You'll Never Walk Alone" was not used because it had recently been re-recorded for the Bradford City stadium fire appeal.

=== Effect on survivors ===
By the disaster's 10th anniversary in 1999, at least three people who survived were known to have taken their own lives. Another survivor had spent eight years in psychiatric care. There were cases of alcoholism, drug abuse, and collapsed marriages involving people who had witnessed the events. The lingering effects of the disaster were seen as a cause, or contributory factor, in all of these.

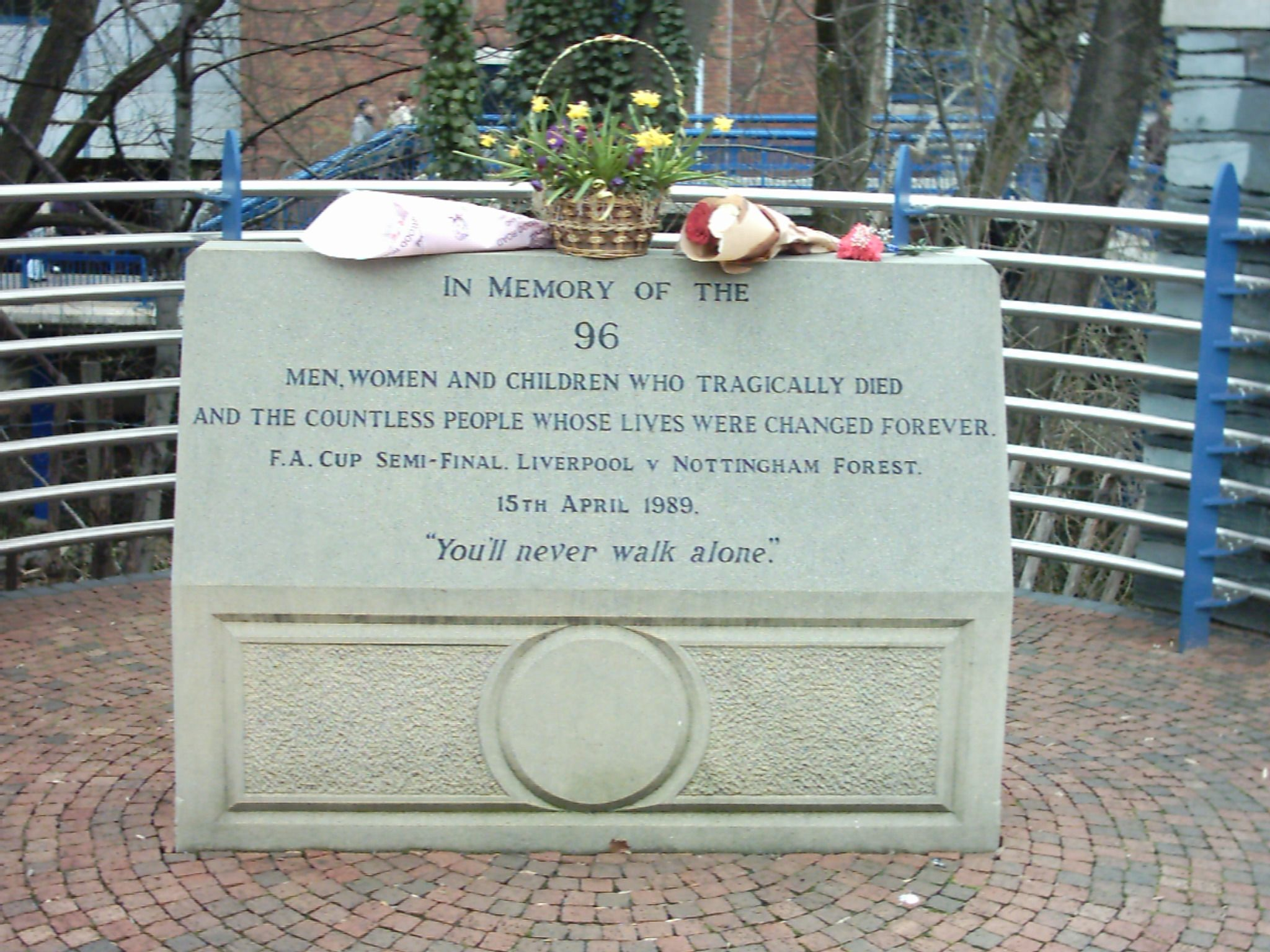
The Memorial to those killed by the disaster at Hillsborough Stadium

== Victims ==
In total, ninety-seven people died as a result of injuries incurred during the disaster. Ninety-four people, aged from 10 to 67 years old, died on the day, either at the stadium, in the ambulances, or shortly after arrival at hospital. A total of 766 people were reported to have suffered injuries, among whom 300 were hospitalised. The less seriously injured survivors who did not live in the Sheffield area were advised to seek treatment for their injuries at hospitals nearer to their homes. On 19 April, the number of deaths reached 95 when 14-year-old Lee Nicol died in hospital after being taken off life support. The 96th victim died in March 1993, when artificial feeding and hydration were withdrawn from 22-year-old Tony Bland after nearly four years, during which time he had remained in a persistent vegetative state showing no sign of improvement. This followed a legal challenge in the High Court by his family to have his treatment withdrawn, a landmark challenge which succeeded in November 1992.

Andrew Devine, aged 22 at the time of the disaster, suffered similar injuries to Tony Bland and was also diagnosed as being in a persistent vegetative state. In March 1997 – just before the eighth anniversary of the disaster – it was reported he had emerged from the condition and was able to communicate using a touch-sensitive pad, and he had been showing signs of awareness of his surroundings for up to three years before. Devine died in 2021, as a consequence of the injuries sustained at Hillsborough; the coroner ruled that he had been unlawfully killed and thus the 97th fatality of the disaster.

Two sisters, three pairs of brothers, and a father and son were among those who died, as were two men about to become fathers for the first time: 25-year-old Steven Brown of Wrexham and 30-year-old Peter Thompson of Widnes. Jon-Paul Gilhooley, aged 10, was the youngest person to die. His cousin, Steven Gerrard, then aged 8, went on to become Liverpool F.C.'s captain. Gerrard has said the disaster inspired him to lead the team he supported as a boy and become a top professional football player. The oldest person to die at Hillsborough was 67-year-old Gerard Baron, an older brother of former Liverpool player Kevin Baron.

Stephen Whittle is considered by some to be another victim of Hillsborough, as due to work commitments, he had sold his ticket to a friend (whom he and his family chose not to identify), who then died in the disaster; the resulting feeling of survivor guilt is believed to be the main reason he took his own life at age 50 in February 2011. In addition, it was also noted that Whittle became withdrawn from friends and family, and was unable to go to football matches due to his guilt and related feeling of responsibility for his friend's death.

The majority of victims who died were from Liverpool (38) and Greater Merseyside (20). A further 20 were from counties adjacent to Merseyside. An additional three victims came from Sheffield with two more living in counties adjacent to South Yorkshire. The remaining 14 victims lived in other parts of England.

=== Ages ===
Of those who died, 79 were aged under 30, 38 of whom were under 20, and all but three of the victims were aged under 50.

Age range in 1989	Total	Males	Females
10–19	38	36	2
20–29	41	37	4
30–39	12	11	1
40–49	3	3	0
50–59	1	1	0
60–69	2	2	0
Totals	97	90	7

== 1989–1991 coroner's hearing ==
Inquests into the deaths were opened and adjourned immediately after the disaster.

Resumed on 19 November 1990, they proved to be controversial. South Yorkshire coroner Stefan Popper limited the main inquests to events up to 3:15 pm on the day of the disaster – nine minutes after the match was halted and the crowd spilt onto the pitch. Popper said this was because the victims were either dead, or brain dead, by 3:15 pm. The decision angered the families, many of whom felt the inquests were unable to consider the response of the police and other emergency services after that time. The inquests returned verdicts of accidental death on 26 March 1991, much to the dismay of the bereaved families, who had been hoping for a verdict of unlawful killing or an open verdict, and for manslaughter charges to be brought against the officers who had been present at the disaster. Trevor Hicks, whose two daughters had been killed, described the verdicts as 'lawful' but 'immoral'.

Popper's decision regarding the cut-off time was subsequently endorsed by the Divisional Court who considered it to have been justified in the light of the medical evidence available to him. Relatives later failed to have the inquests reopened to allow more scrutiny of police actions and closer examination of the circumstances of individual cases.

Families believed that Popper was 'too close' to the police. After the verdicts Barry Devonside, who had lost his son, witnessed Popper hosting a celebration party with police officers.

One of the individual cases where the circumstances of death were not fully resolved was that of Kevin Williams, the fifteen-year-old son of Anne Williams. Anne Williams, who died in 2013, rejected the coroner's decision that the Hillsborough victims, including her son, had died before 3:15 pm, citing witness statements that described him showing signs of life at 4:00 pm. She unsuccessfully appealed to the European Court of Human Rights in 2009. The Hillsborough Independent Panel considered the available evidence and stated that "the initial pathologist's opinion appeared definitive, but further authoritative opinions raised significant doubts about the accuracy of that initial opinion."

Popper had excluded the witness evidence of two qualified Merseyside doctors (John Ashton and Glyn Phillips) who had been inside the stadium on the day and who had been critical of the chaotic emergency response. The views of both were dismissed by the Taylor report. They both gave evidence at the 2016 Warrington inquests. Phillips stated that the exclusion of their evidence was a 'serious error of judgement' by Popper. He said that he 'could not fathom why he didn't call us, other than he specifically did not want to hear our evidence, in which case the first inquests were coloured and flawed before they even started'.

Ashton and Phillips were not the only doctors present at the disaster not to be called to give evidence to the Popper inquests. The only one called was the Sheffield Wednesday club doctor.

== Taylor Inquiry ==
After the disaster, Lord Justice Taylor was appointed to conduct an inquiry into the events. The Taylor Inquiry sat for a total of 31 days (between 15 May and 29 June 1989) and published two reports: an interim report (1 August 1989) which laid out the events of the day and immediate conclusions; and a final report (19 January 1990) which outlined general recommendations on football ground safety. The two publications together became known as the Taylor Report.

Taylor concluded that policing on the day "broke down" and "the main reason for the disaster was the failure of police control". Attention was focused on the decision to open the secondary gates; moreover, the kick-off should have been delayed, as had been done at other venues and matches.

Sheffield Wednesday was also criticised for the inadequate number of turnstiles at the Leppings Lane end and the poor quality of the crush barriers on the terraces, "respects in which failure by the Club contributed to this disaster".

=== Police control ===
Taylor found there was "no provision" for controlling the entry of spectators into the turnstile area. He dismissed the claim by senior police officers that they had no reason to anticipate problems, since congestion had occurred at both the 1987 and 1988 semi-finals. He said that "the Operational Order and police tactics on the day failed to provide for controlling a concentrated arrival of large numbers should that occur in a short period. That it might so occur was foreseeable". The failure by the police to give the order to direct fans to empty areas of the stadium, was described by Taylor as "a blunder of the first magnitude".

There was no means for calculating when individual enclosures had reached capacity. A police officer ordinarily made a visual assessment before guiding fans to other pens. However, on the day of the disaster, "by 2:52 pm when gate C was opened, pens 3 and 4 were over-full [...] to allow any more into those pens was likely to cause injuries; to allow in a large stream was courting disaster".

The report noted that the official capacity of the central pens was 2,200, that the Health and Safety Executive found this should have been reduced to 1,693 due to crush barriers and perimeter gates, but actually an estimated 3,000 people were in the pens around 3:00 pm. The report said "When spectators first appeared on the track, the immediate assumption in the control room was that a pitch invasion was threatened. This was unlikely at the beginning of a match. It became still less likely when those on the track made no move towards the pitch. ... [T]here was no effective leadership either from control or on the pitch to harness and organise rescue efforts. No orders were given for officers to enter the tunnel and relieve pressure". Further that: "The anxiety to protect the sanctity of the pitch has caused insufficient attention to be paid to the risk of a crush due to overcrowding".

Regarding the decision to allocate Liverpool spectators to the West and North Ends, Taylor stated "I do not consider choice of ends was causative of the disaster. Had it been reversed, the disaster could well have occurred in a similar manner but to Nottingham supporters".

Lord Taylor noted with regard to the performance of the senior police officers in command that "...neither their handling of the problems on the day nor their account of it in evidence showed the qualities of leadership to be expected of their rank".

=== Behaviour of fans ===
Lord Taylor concluded that the behaviour of Liverpool fans, including accusations of drunkenness, were secondary factors, and said that most fans were: "not drunk, nor even the worse for drink". He concluded that this formed an exacerbating factor but that police, seeking to rationalise their loss of control, overestimated the element of drunkenness in the crowd.

The report dismissed the theory, put forward by South Yorkshire Police, that fans attempting to gain entry without tickets or with forged tickets were contributing factors.

=== Emergency response ===
Taylor concluded that in responding to the disaster there had been no fault on the part of the emergency services (St John Ambulance, South Yorkshire Metropolitan Ambulance Service and fire brigade).

=== Police evasion ===
Taylor concluded his criticism of South Yorkshire Police by describing senior officers in command as "defensive and evasive witnesses" who refused to accept any responsibility for error: "In all some 65 police officers gave oral evidence at the Inquiry. Sadly I must report that for the most part the quality of their evidence was in inverse proportion to their rank". Further stating: "South Yorkshire Police were not prepared to concede they were in any respect at fault in what occurred. ... [T]he police case was to blame the fans for being late and drunk, and to blame the Club for failing to monitor the pens. ... Such an unrealistic approach gives cause for anxiety as to whether lessons have been learnt".

=== Effect on stadiums in Britain ===
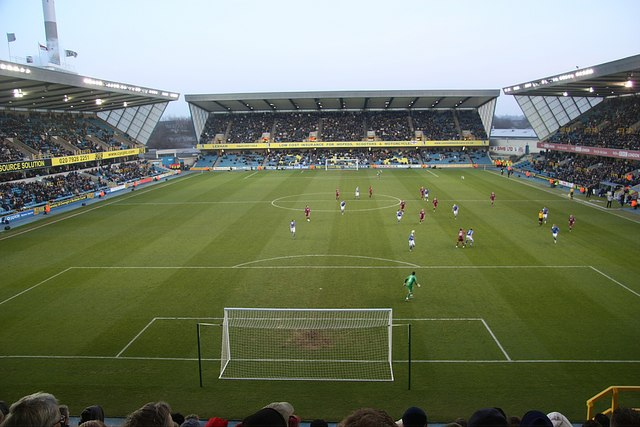
The Den in southeast London, which opened in 1993, was the first new stadium to be fully compliant with the safety recommendations of the Taylor Report.

The Taylor Report had a deep impact on safety standards for stadiums in the UK. Perimeter and lateral fencing was removed and many top stadiums were converted to all-seated. Purpose-built stadiums for Premier League and most Football League teams since the report are all-seater.

In July 1992, the government announced a relaxation of the regulation for the lower two English leagues (known now as League One and League Two). The Football Spectators Act does not cover Scotland, but the Scottish Premier League chose to make all-seater stadiums a requirement of league membership, this has not applied since the creation of the Scottish Professional Football League in 2013. In England and Wales all-seating is a requirement of the Premier League and of the Football League for clubs who have been present in the Championship for more than three seasons. Several campaigns have attempted to get the government to relax the regulation and allow standing areas to return to Premiership and Championship grounds.

== Stuart-Smith scrutiny ==
In May 1997, when the Labour Party came into office, Home Secretary Jack Straw ordered an investigation. It was performed by Lord Justice Stuart-Smith. The appointment of Stuart-Smith was not without controversy. At a meeting in Liverpool with relatives of those involved in Hillsborough in October 1997, he flippantly remarked "Have you got a few of your people or are they like the Liverpool fans, turn up at the last minute?" He later apologised for his remark, saying it was not intended to offend. The terms of reference of his inquiry were limited to "new evidence", that is "...evidence which was not available or was not presented to the previous inquiries, courts or authorities." Therefore, evidence such as witness statements which had been altered were classed as inadmissible. When he presented his report in February 1998, he concluded that there was insufficient evidence for a new inquiry into the disaster. In paragraph 5 of his summary, Lord Justice Stuart-Smith said:

I have come to the clear conclusion that there is no basis upon which there should be a further Judicial Inquiry or a reopening of Lord Taylor's Inquiry. There is no basis for a renewed application to the Divisional Court or for the Attorney General to exercise his powers under the Coroners Act 1988. I do not consider that there is any material which should be put before the Director of Public Prosecutions or the Police Complaints Authority which might cause them to reconsider the decisions they have already taken. Nor do I consider that there is any justification for setting up any further inquiry into the performance of the emergency and hospital services. I have considered the circumstances in which alterations were made to some of the self-written statements of South Yorkshire Police officers, but I do not consider that there is any occasion for any further investigation.

Importantly, Stuart-Smith's report supported the coroner's assertion that evidence after 3:15 pm was inadmissible as "that by 3:15 pm the principal cause of death, that is, the crushing, was over." This was controversial as the subsequent response of the police and emergency services would not be scrutinised. Announcing the report to the House of Commons, Home Secretary Jack Straw backed Stuart-Smith's findings and said that "I do not believe that a further inquiry could or would uncover significant new evidence or provide any relief for the distress of those who have been bereaved." However, the determination by Stuart-Smith was heavily criticised by the former Lord Chancellor, Lord Falconer, who stated "I am absolutely sure that Sir Murray Stuart-Smith came completely to the wrong conclusion". Falconer added: "It made the families in the Hillsborough disaster feel after one establishment cover-up, here was another."

== Hillsborough Independent Panel ==
The Hillsborough Independent Panel was instituted in 2009 by the British government to investigate the Hillsborough disaster, to oversee the disclosure of documents about the disaster and its aftermath and to produce a report. On 12 September 2012, it published its report and simultaneously launched a website containing 450,000 pages of material collated from 85 organisations and individuals over two years.

=== History ===
In the years after the disaster, the Hillsborough Family Support Group had campaigned for the release of all relevant documents into the public domain. After the disaster's 20th anniversary in April 2009, supported by the Culture Secretary, Andy Burnham, and Minister of State for Justice, Maria Eagle, the government asked the Home Office and Department of Culture, Media and Sport to investigate the best way for this information to be made public. In April 2009, the home secretary Jacqui Smith announced she had requested secret files concerning the disaster be made public.

In December 2009, Home Secretary Alan Johnson said the Hillsborough Independent Panel's remit would be to oversee "full public disclosure of relevant government and local information within the limited constraints set out in the disclosure protocol" and "consult with the Hillsborough families to ensure that the views of those most affected by the disaster are taken into account". An archive of all relevant documentation would be created and a report produced within two years explaining the work of the panel and its conclusions.

The panel was chaired by James Jones, the Bishop of Liverpool. Other members were:

- Raju Bhatt, human rights lawyer
- Christine Gifford, expert in the field of access to information
- Katy Jones, investigative journalist
- Bill Kirkup, Associate chief medical officer in the Department of Health
- Paul Leighton, former deputy chief constable of the Police Service of Northern Ireland
- Phil Scraton, expert in criminology
- Peter Sissons, broadcaster (media)
- Sarah Tyacke, former chief executive of the National Archives

=== Findings ===
On 12 September 2012, the Hillsborough Independent Panel concluded that no Liverpool fans were responsible in any way for the disaster, and that its main cause was a "lack of police control". Crowd safety was "compromised at every level" and overcrowding issues had been recorded two years earlier. The panel concluded that "up to 41" of the 96 who had died up to that date, might have survived had the emergency services' reactions and co-ordination been better. The number is based on post-mortem examinations which found some victims may have had heart, lung or blood circulation function for some time after being removed from the crush. The report stated that placing fans who were "merely unconscious" on their backs rather than in the recovery position, would have resulted in their deaths due to airway obstruction. Their report was in 395 pages and delivered 153 key findings.

The findings concluded that 164 witness statements had been altered. Of those statements, 116 were amended to remove or change negative comments about South Yorkshire Police. South Yorkshire Police had performed blood alcohol tests on the victims, some of them children, and ran computer checks on the national police database in an attempt to "impugn their reputation". The report concluded that the then Conservative MP for Sheffield Hallam, Irvine Patnick, passed inaccurate and untrue information from the police to the press.

The panel noted that, despite being dismissed by the Taylor Report, the idea that alcohol contributed to the disaster proved remarkably durable. Documents disclosed confirm that repeated attempts were made to find supporting evidence for alcohol being a factor, and that available evidence was significantly misinterpreted. It noted "The weight placed on alcohol in the face of objective evidence of a pattern of consumption modest for a leisure event was inappropriate. It has since fuelled persistent and unsustainable assertions about drunken fan behaviour".

The evidence it released online included altered police reports.

=== Effects ===
Subsequent apologies were released by Prime Minister David Cameron on behalf of the government, Ed Miliband on behalf of the opposition, Sheffield Wednesday Football Club, South Yorkshire Police, and former editor of The Sun, Kelvin MacKenzie, who apologised for making false accusations under the headline "The Truth". MacKenzie said he should have written a headline that read "The Lies", although this apology was rejected by the Hillsborough Family Support Group and Liverpool fans, as it was seen to be "shifting the blame once again."

After publication, the Hillsborough Family Support Group called for new inquests for the victims. They also called for prosecutions for unlawful killing, corporate manslaughter and perversion of the course of justice in respect of the actions of the police both in causing the disaster and covering up their actions; and in respect of Sheffield Wednesday F.C., Sheffield Council and the Football Association for their various responsibilities for providing, certifying and selecting the stadium for the fatal event.

Calls were made for the resignation of police officers involved in the cover-up, and for Sheffield Wednesday, the police and the Football Association to admit their blame. Calls were also made for Sir Dave Richards to resign as chairman of the Premier League and give up his knighthood as a result of his conduct at Sheffield Wednesday at the time of the disaster. The home secretary called for investigations into law-breaking and promised resources to investigate individual or systematic issues.

On 23 October 2012, Norman Bettison resigned with immediate effect as chief constable of West Yorkshire Police, after Maria Eagle MP on the floor of the House and protected by parliamentary privilege, accused him of boasting about concocting a story that all the Liverpool fans were drunk and police were afraid they were going to break down the gates and decided to open them. Bettison denied the claim, and other allegations about his conduct, saying:

Fans' behaviour, to the extent that it was relevant at all, made the job of the police, in the crush outside Leppings Lane turnstiles, harder than it needed to be. But it didn't cause the disaster any more than the sunny day that encouraged people to linger outside the stadium as kick off approached. I held those views then, I hold them now. I have never, since hearing the Taylor evidence unfold, offered any other interpretation in public or private.

Merseyside Police Authority confirmed that Bettison would receive an £83,000 pension, unless convicted of a criminal offence. Hillsborough families called for the payments to be frozen during the IPCC investigation. In the same 22 October House of Commons debate, Stephen Mosley MP alleged West Midlands police pressured witnesses – both police and civilians – to change their statements. Maria Eagle confirmed her understanding that WMP actions in this respect would be the subject of IPCC scrutiny.

== Second coroner's hearing ==
Following an application on 19 December 2012 by the Attorney General Dominic Grieve, the High Court quashed the verdicts in the original inquests and ordered fresh inquests to be held. Sir John Goldring was appointed as Assistant Coroner for South Yorkshire (East) and West Yorkshire (West) to conduct those inquests. The inquests hearings started on Monday 31 March 2014 at Warrington. Transcripts of the proceedings and evidence that was produced during the hearings were published at the Hillsborough Inquests official website. On 6 April 2016, the nine jurors were sent out to consider their verdicts. These were formally given to the inquests at 11:00 on 26 April 2016. The jury returned a verdict of unlawful killing in respect of all 96 victims (by majority verdict of 7–2). Upon receiving the April 2016 verdict, Hillsborough Family Support Group chair Margaret Aspinall, whose 18-year-old son James was killed in the disaster, said:

Let's be honest about this – people were against us. We had the media against us, as well as the establishment. Everything was against us. The only people that weren't against us was our own city. That's why I am so grateful to my city and so proud of my city. They always believed in us.

On the day after the verdicts were reached, the home secretary, Theresa May, made a statement to Parliament which included the verdicts of the jury to the fourteen questions they had been asked regarding the roles of South Yorkshire police, the South Yorkshire Metropolitan Ambulance Service, Sheffield Wednesday football club and Hillsborough stadium's engineers and two specific questions relating to the time and cause of death for each of the dead. In addition to the "unlawful killing" verdict, the jury concluded that "errors or omissions" by police commanding officers, Sheffield Wednesday, the ambulance service and the design and certification of the stadium had all "caused or contributed" to the deaths, but that the behaviour of football supporters had not. In all but one case, the jury recorded the time of death as later than the 3:15 pm cut-off point adopted by the coroner at the original inquests.

Prime Minister David Cameron also responded to the April 2016 verdict by saying that it represented a "long overdue" but "landmark moment in the quest for justice", adding "All families and survivors now have official confirmation of what they always knew was the case, that the Liverpool fans were utterly blameless in the disaster that unfolded at Hillsborough." The Labour Party described the handling of the Hillsborough disaster as the "greatest miscarriage of justice of our times", with Labour MPs Andy Burnham and Steve Rotheram calling for accountability and the prosecution of those responsible. Liberal Democrat MP John Pugh called for David Cameron to make a formal apology in the House of Commons to the families of those killed at Hillsborough and to the city of Liverpool as a whole.

Echoing his 2012 expression of regret former home secretary Jack Straw apologised to the families for the failures of his 1997 review of the disaster.

Kelvin MacKenzie, who wrote the now-infamous "The Truth" front page for the Sun, said that although he was "duped" into publishing his story, his "heart goes out" to the families of those affected, saying that "It's quite clear today the fans had nothing to do with it". However, MacKenzie did not accept any personal responsibility for the story.

During the inquests, Maxwell Groome – a police constable at the time of the disaster – made allegations of a high-level "conspiracy" by Freemasons to shift blame for the disaster onto Superintendent Roger Marshall, also that junior officers were pressured into changing their statements after the disaster, and told not to write their accounts in their official police pocketbooks. Groome also claimed that match commander Duckenfield was a member of the "highly influential" Dole lodge in Sheffield (the same lodge as Brian Mole, his predecessor). Coroner Sir John Goldring warned the jury that there was "not a shred of evidence" that any Masonic meeting actually took place, or that those named were all Freemasons, advising the jury to cast aside "gossip and hearsay". During the inquests, Duckenfield confirmed that he became a Freemason in 1975 and became Worshipful Master of his local lodge in 1990, a year after the disaster; following this revelation, Freemasons were forbidden to take part in the IPCC investigation and Operation Resolve as civilian investigators to prevent any perceived bias.

=== Independent Police Complaints Commission investigation ===
Following the inquests verdicts, South Yorkshire police announced it would refer the actions of its officers to the Independent Police Complaints Commission (IPCC). West Yorkshire Police announced it would refer its chief constable, Norman Bettison, to the IPCC in mid-September. Bettison had been one of a number of police officers who were accused by the Hillsborough Independent Panel of manipulating evidence. In early October, Bettison announced his retirement, becoming the first senior figure to step down since publication of the panel's report.

The IPCC announced on 12 October 2012 that it would investigate the failure of the police to declare a major incident, failure to close the tunnel to the stands which led to overcrowded pens despite evidence it had been closed in such circumstances in the past; changes made to the statements of police officers; actions which misled Parliament and the media; shortcomings of previous investigations; and the role played by Norman Bettison.

By 22 October 2012, the names of at least 1,444 serving and former police officers had been referred to the IPCC investigation. In its announcement, the IPCC praised the tenacity of the Hillsborough families' campaign for truth and justice. On 16 October 2012, the attorney general announced in Parliament he had applied to have the original inquests' verdicts quashed, arguing it proceeded on a false basis and evidence now to hand required this exceptional step.

On 12 July 2013, it was reported that the IPCC had found that in addition to the now 164 police statements known to have been altered, a further 55 police officers had changed their statements. Deborah Glass, deputy chair of the IPCC said, "We know the people who have contacted us are the tip of the iceberg." That was after the IPCC's Hillsborough Contact team had received 230 pieces of correspondence since October 2012.

The IPCC is also investigating the actions of West Midlands Police, who in 1989 had been tasked with investigating South Yorkshire Police's conduct for both the original inquests and also the Taylor independent inquiry.

A 2016 independent inquiry later ruled that the fans were "unlawfully killed", saying the deadly crush was caused by police errors in opening an exit gate before kickoff. In 2023, South Yorkshire Police admitted that their policing of the game had gone "catastrophically wrong".

In April 2016, the Crown Prosecution Service announced that it would consider bringing charges against both individuals and corporate bodies once the criminal investigation by the Independent Police Complaints Commission – Operation Resolve – had been completed.

Hillsborough remains Europe's biggest sporting disaster and the UK’s biggest police cover-up. After a settlement was reached between the police force and the victim's families, an attorney for the victims families said, "We trust that this settlement will put an end to any fresh attempts to rewrite the record and wrongly claim that there was no cover-up."

=== "The patronising disposition of unaccountable power" report ===
In April 2016, the then Home Secretary Theresa May commissioned James Jones (Bishop of Liverpool from 1998 to 2013) to produce a report on the experiences of the Hillsborough families, in the hope that their pain and suffering would not be repeated and that their perspective would not be lost. After carrying out a thorough review, Jones published his report – titled The patronising disposition of unaccountable power: A report to ensure that the pain and suffering of the Hillsborough families is not repeated – on 1 November 2017. Having met the Hillsborough families in one-to-one meetings and group sessions whilst compiling his report, Jones was able to include numerous first-hand accounts of their encounters with private and public authorities.

The report identified 25 'points of learning', of which the following drew particular attention:

- Charter for Families Bereaved through Public Tragedy – a series of commitments by public bodies to change, related to transparency and acting in the public interest
- Proper participation' of bereaved families at inquests – including publicly funded legal representation for bereaved families at inquests at which public bodies are legally represented, an end to public bodies spending limitless sums, and a change in the way that public bodies approach inquests
- A duty of candour for police officers – requiring them to cooperate fully with investigations into alleged criminal offences or misconduct, as undertaken by the Independent Police Complaints Commission or its successor body

In the report, James also called for the government to give "full consideration" to a proposed Public Authority Accountability Bill, known informally as 'The Hillsborough Law', which would include a legal duty of candour on public authorities and officials to be truthful and to proactively cooperate with official investigations and inquiries. The full text of the draft bill was provided as an appendix to his report.

Six years after the report was published, on 6 December 2023, the government issued its response and signed the Hillsborough Charter giving a commitment to transparency following a public tragedy. However, the proposal for a 'Hillsborough Law' was rejected as it was considered by the government to be "not necessary".

== Criminal and civil cases ==
=== Prosecutions ===
In February 2000, a private prosecution was brought against Chief Superintendent David Duckenfield and another officer, Bernard Murray. The prosecution argued that the crush was "foreseeable" hence the defendants were "grossly negligent". Prosecutor Alun Jones told the court that Duckenfield gave the order to open the gates so that hundreds of fans could be herded onto the already crowded terraces at the stadium. Jones stated that minutes after the disaster, Duckenfield "deceitfully and dishonestly" told senior FA officials that the supporters had forced the gate open. Duckenfield admitted that he had lied in certain statements regarding the causes of the disaster. The prosecution ended on 24 July 2000, when Murray was acquitted and the jury was unable to reach a verdict in the case of Duckenfield. On 26 July, the judge refused the prosecution's application for a retrial of Duckenfield.

Police disciplinary charges were abandoned when Duckenfield retired on health grounds and, because Murray was unavailable, it was decided not to proceed with disciplinary charges against him. Duckenfield took medical retirement on a full police pension.

Home Secretary Theresa May announced on 18 December 2012 that a new police inquiry would be initiated to examine the possibility of charging agencies other than the police over the Hillsborough deaths. The inquiry was first headed by former Durham Chief Constable Jon Stoddart, and later by Assistant Commissioner Rob Beckley.

On 28 June 2017, it was announced that six people were to be charged with offences in relation to the disaster. Former chief superintendent Duckenfield, in charge of the match, faced 95 counts of manslaughter by gross negligence. He faced no charge in respect of the death of Tony Bland, who died four years after the disaster. Former chief inspector Sir Norman Bettinson faced four counts of misconduct in public office. Former Sheffield Wednesday F.C. club secretary Graham Mackrell faced a charge of breaching the Safety of Sports Grounds Act 1975. Solicitor Peter Metcalf, former chief superintendent Donald Denton, and former detective chief inspector Alan Foster were all charged with perverting the course of justice, for having altered 68 police officers' statements in order to "mask the failings" of the police force.

On 9 August 2017, all except Duckenfield appeared at Warrington Magistrates Court. Mackrell pleaded not guilty to the charge against him. No formal pleas were taken from the other four defendants. All five were bailed to appear at the Crown Court in September. Duckenfield was not required to appear as the Crown Prosecution Service (CPS) needed to apply to the High Court to lift a court order before he could be prosecuted on the manslaughter charges. On 29 June 2018, a ruling was made that Duckenfield would be prosecuted on the manslaughter charges.

It was announced in December 2017 that a police officer and a farrier would not be prosecuted over allegations that they fabricated a story about a police horse being burned with cigarettes at Hillsborough. Although there was enough evidence to charge the farrier with perverting the course of justice, it was felt not to be in the public interest to charge him. There was insufficient evidence against the police officer to charge him with the offence.

On 21 August 2018, it was announced that all charges against Bettison were being dropped as the CPS felt that there was insufficient evidence to have a realistic chance of a conviction. The death of two witnesses and contradictions in the evidence of others were cited as part of the reason for the decision. Representatives of the 96 victims of the disaster stated that they would be asking for an independent review of the decision under the Right to Review Scheme.

At a trial preparation hearing at Preston Crown Court on 10 September 2018, Duckenfield pleaded not guilty to all 95 charges against him. Mackrell pleaded not guilty to the two charges against him. A provisional trial date was set for 14 January 2019, on which date the trial started at Preston Crown Court before Mr Justice Openshaw.

On 13 March 2019, it was reported that Duckenfield would not be called to give evidence in his defence. It was also reported that the jury would be directed to find Mackrell not guilty on the charge of contravening the stadium's safety certificate due to a lack of evidence. On 3 April, the jury returned with a guilty verdict against Mackrell on a health and safety charge but was unable to reach a verdict on Duckenfield. It was announced on 25 June that Duckenfield would face a retrial, which was scheduled to start on 7 October at Preston Crown Court. On 28 November 2019, Duckenfield was found not guilty of gross negligence manslaughter.

On 26 May 2021, Denton, Foster and Metcalfe were all found not guilty of perverting the course of justice by altering 68 police officers' statements, when Mr Justice William Davis found that they had no case to answer. The reason given was that the public inquiry in 1990, to which the altered statements were submitted, was not a statutory inquiry, and therefore not a Court of Law. Consequently, a course of public justice could not have been perverted. The ruling also noted that the original statements had neither been destroyed, nor had they been ordered to be destroyed.

In response to the acquittals, Leader of the House of Commons Jacob Rees-Mogg called the lack of accountability over Hillsborough "the greatest scandal of British policing of our lifetimes". Garston and Halewood MP Maria Eagle called for the law to be changed to "prevent another catastrophic failure of justice".

On 2 December 2025, the final Independent Office for Police Conduct report found that the remaining 12 South Yorkshire officers who were involved in the disaster would have faced disciplinary cases of gross misconduct if they were still serving, though no action can be taken due to the officers having retired or died.

=== Psychiatric injury and other litigation ===
Various negligence cases were brought against the police by spectators who had been at the ground but had not been in the pens, and by people who watched the incident unfolding on television (or heard about it on the radio). A case, Alcock v Chief Constable of South Yorkshire Police [1992] 1 A.C. 310, was eventually appealed to the Appellate Committee of the House of Lords and was an important milestone in the law of claims of secondary victims for negligently inflicted psychiatric injury. It was held that claimants who watched the disaster on television/listened on radio were not 'proximal' and their claims were rejected.

Another psychiatric injury claim was brought to the House of Lords, White v Chief Constable of the South Yorkshire Police [1999] 2 A.C. 455. It was brought by police officers on duty against the chief constable who was said to have been vicariously liable for the disaster. Their claims were dismissed and the Alcock decision was upheld. It affirmed the position of the courts once again towards claims of psychiatric injuries of secondary victims.

A third legal case which resulted from the Hillsborough disaster was Airedale N.H.S. Trust v Bland [1993] A.C. 789, a landmark House of Lords decision in English criminal law, that allowed the life-support machine of Tony Bland, a Hillsborough victim in a persistent vegetative state, to be switched off.

In April 2016, an action was launched in the High Court on behalf of victims' relatives against both SYP and the West Midlands Police force (who had investigated the actions of SYP) alleging misfeasance in public office, involving a concerted cover-up designed to shift blame away from the police. An agreement was reached to settle the case in April 2021, but reporting restrictions were put in place due to the pending trial of Denton, Foster and Metcalf. Following the finding that they did not have a case to answer, the restrictions were lifted.

=== Hillsborough Law ===
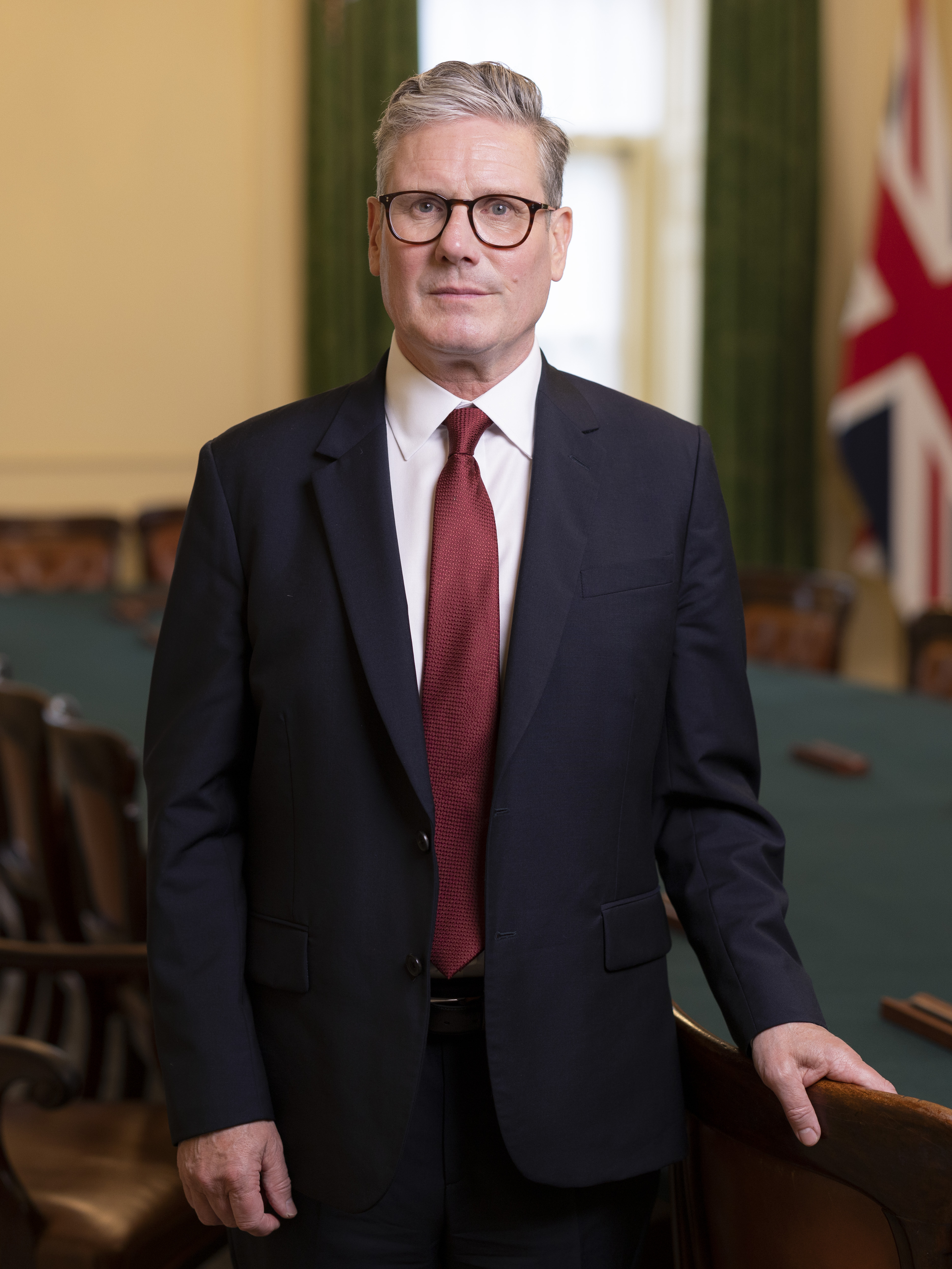
As Prime Minister, Keir Starmer championed and oversaw the introduction of the Hillsborough Law.

The Public Authority (Accountability) Bill, sometimes known as the Hillsborough Law, had been proposed by bereaved families of various disasters whereby public bodies and public servants (such as police) would have a "duty of candour".

The legislation, which received its first reading in Parliament in September 2025, aimed to prevent future cover-ups by public officials and ensure justice for victims of major disasters like Hillsborough. Keir Starmer met with campaigners, including Margaret Aspinall, whose son died at Hillsborough, to mark the bill's introduction. Aspinall said she was grateful to Starmer for fulfilling his promise. Starmer had previously faced criticism for delays, having pledged to introduce the law by the 36th anniversary of the disaster in April 2025. He insisted he wanted to "take the time to get it right" amid concerns from campaigners and MPs about civil servants watering down the bill. Starmer and other government ministers have framed the Hillsborough Law as a measure to address institutional failures in a range of disasters, including the Horizon IT scandal, the infected blood scandal, and the Grenfell Tower fire.

The proposed legislation was praised by campaigner groups and local leaders, including Mayor of Liverpool City Region Steve Rotheram, who described it as a "landmark moment".

In July 2026, the bill was approved by the House of Commons and is due to be further scrutinised by the House of Lords. The government hopes the law will have been passed by April 2027, in time for the next anniversary of the Hillsborough disaster.

== Memorials ==
=== Permanent memorials ===
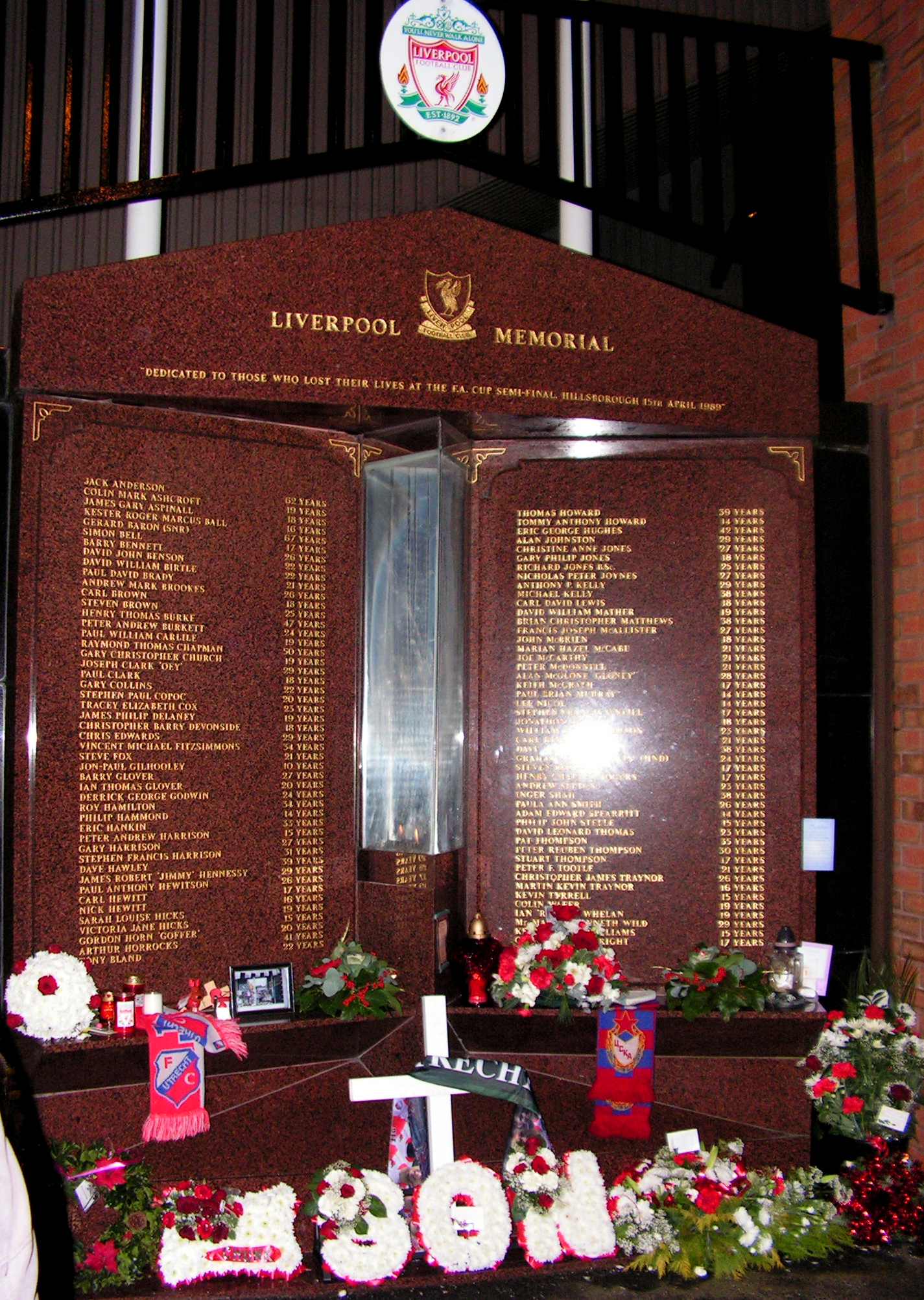
The Hillsborough memorial at Anfield in Liverpool

Several memorials have been erected in memory of the victims of the Hillsborough disaster.

- Flames were added either side of the Liverpool F.C. crest in memory of the fans who lost their lives in the Hillsborough disaster.
- The Hillsborough memorial at Anfield (featuring the names of the 97 who lost their lives, and an eternal flame) was located next to the Shankly Gates before it was moved to the front of the redeveloped main stand in 2016. It was modified with a 97th name after Andrew Devine died in 2021.
- A memorial at Hillsborough stadium, unveiled on the tenth anniversary of the disaster on 15 April 1999, reads: "In memory of the 96 men, women, and children who tragically died and the countless people whose lives were changed forever. FA Cup semi-final Liverpool v Nottingham Forest. 15 April 1989. 'You'll never walk alone.'"
- A memorial stone in the pavement on the south side of Liverpool's Anglican cathedral.
- A memorial garden in Hillsborough Park with a "You'll never walk alone" gateway.
- A headstone at the junction of Middlewood Road, Leppings Lane and Wadsley Lane, near the ground and by the Sheffield Supertram route.
- A Hillsborough Memorial Rose Garden in Port Sunlight, Wirral.

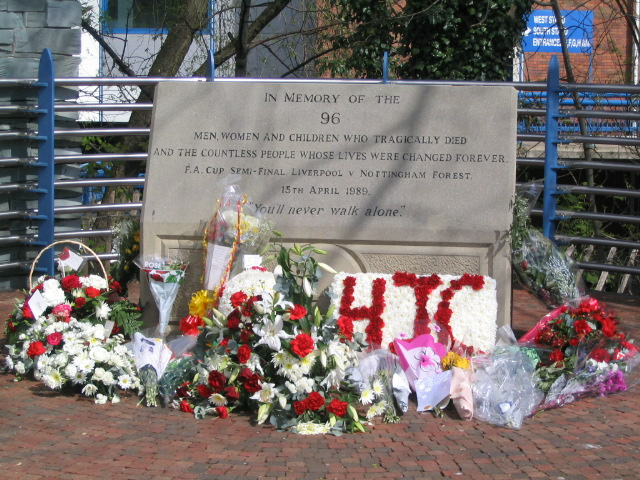
Memorial at Hillsborough Stadium

- A memorial rose garden on Sudley Estate in South Liverpool (also known as the APH). Each of the six rose beds has a centre piece of a white standard rosebush, surrounded by red rose bushes, named 'Liverpool Remember'. There are brass memorial plaques on both sets of gates to the garden, and a sundial inscribed with the words: "Time Marches On But We Will Always Remember".
- In the grounds of Crosby Library, to the memory of the 18 football fans from Sefton who lost their lives in the Hillsborough disaster. The memorial, sited in a raised rose bed containing the Liverpool Remembers red rose, is made of black granite. It is inscribed: "In loving memory of the 96 football supporters who died at Hillsborough, Sheffield on 15 April 1989. Of those who lost their lives the following young men were from Sefton families." The memorial was unveiled on 4 October 1991 (two years before the death of Tony Bland) by the mayor of Sefton, Councillor Syd Whitby. The project was carried out by the council after consultation with the Sefton Survivors Group.

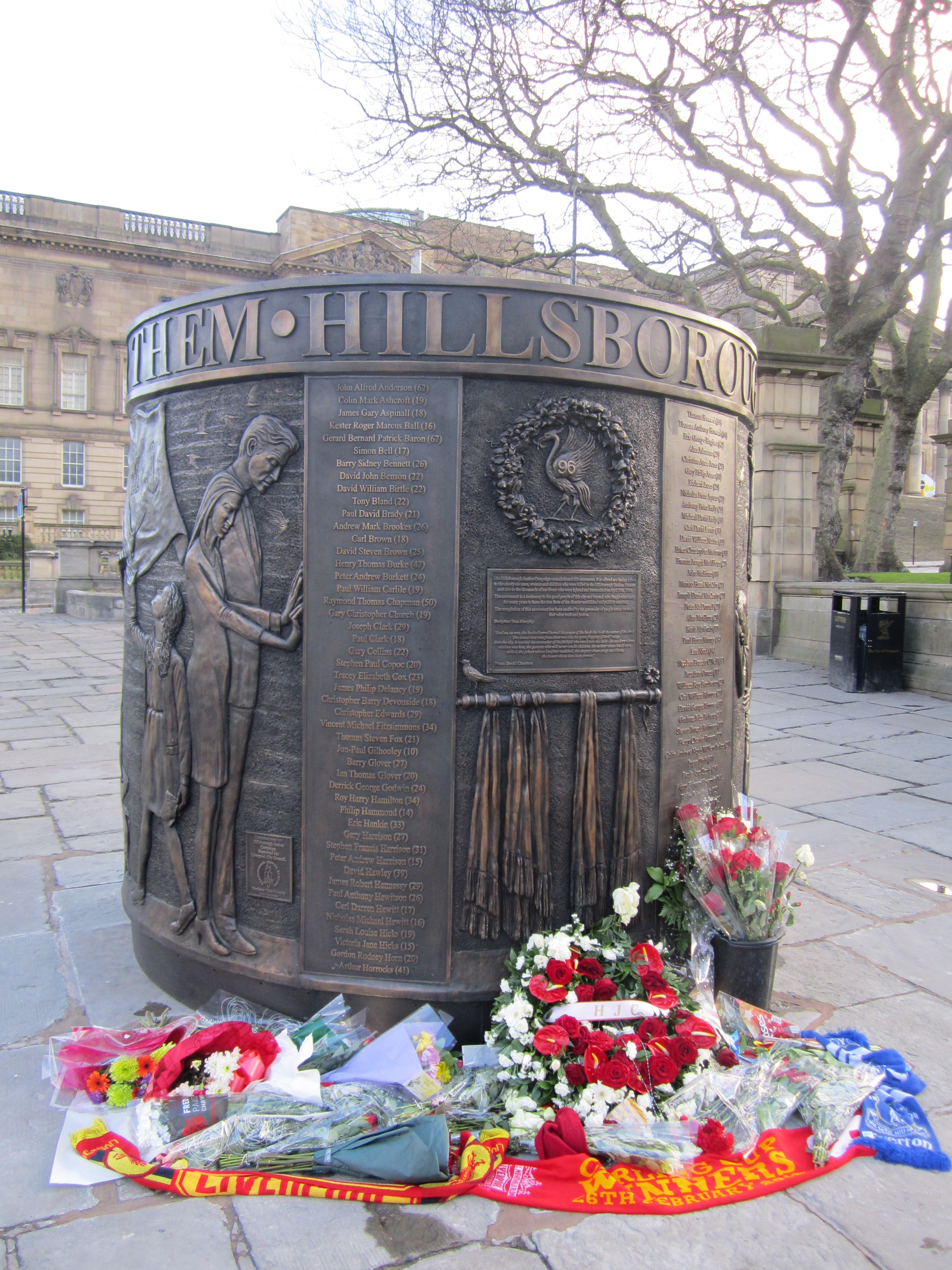
Memorial at Old Haymarket, Liverpool

- A seven-foot-high circular bronze memorial was unveiled in the Old Haymarket district of Liverpool in April 2013. This memorial is inscribed with the words: "Hillsborough Disaster – we will remember them", and displays the names of the 96 victims who died.
- An eight-foot-high clock, dating from the 1780s, was installed at Liverpool Town Hall in April 2013, with the hands indicating 3:06 (the time at which the match was abandoned).
- A memorial plaque dedicated to the 97 at Goodison Park in Liverpool, home of local rivals Everton F.C.
- Hillsborough Oaks – 96 oak trees planted in Cross Hillocks Wood, next to the Knowsley Expressway, with a memorial unveiled on 20 September 2000.

=== Memorial ceremonies ===
The disaster has been acknowledged on 15 April every year by the community in Liverpool and football in general. An annual memorial ceremony is held at Anfield and at a church in Liverpool. The 10th and 20th anniversaries were marked by special services to remember the victims. Liverpool F.C. typically request that they are not scheduled to play on the anniversary of the disaster.

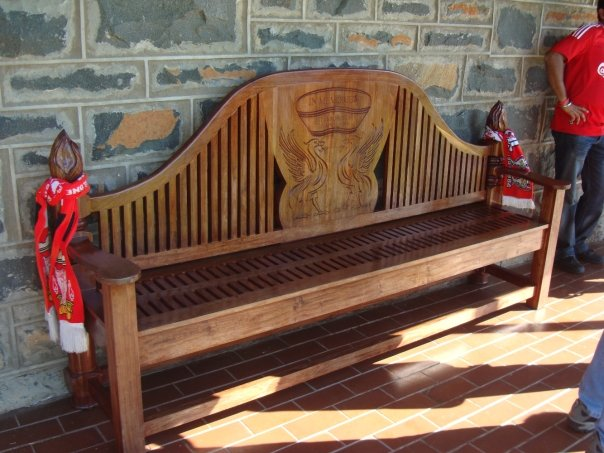
Bench at Spion Kop, South Africa, acting as a permanent memorial to those killed at Hillsborough

From 2007, an annual Hillsborough Memorial service was held at Spion Kop, KwaZulu-Natal, South Africa. The ceremony was held on the Spion Kop Battlefield that gave its name to the Kop Stand at Anfield. There is a permanent memorial to the 96 fans who died, in the form of a bench in view of the battlefield at a nearby lodge. South African Liverpool supporters were responsible for the service and the bench was commissioned in 2008. Following on from the Hillsborough families' decision to conclude official memorials at Anfield with a final service in 2016, it was decided not to hold any further memorials at Spion Kop. The Memorial bench remains at Spion Kop Lodge. In April 2023, a single seat was added to commemorate the 97th victim, Andrew Devine.

In 2014, to mark the 25th anniversary of the disaster, the FA decided that all FA Cup, Premier League, Football League, and Football Conference matches played between 11 and 14 April would kick-off seven minutes later than originally scheduled with a six-minute delay and a one-minute silence tribute.

=== 10th anniversary ===
In 1999, Anfield was packed with a crowd of around 10,000 people ten years after the disaster. A candle was lit for each of the 96 victims. The clock at the Kop End stood still at 3:06 pm, the time that the referee had blown his whistle in 1989 and a minute's silence was held, the start signalled by match referee from that day, Ray Lewis. A service led by the Right Reverend James Jones, the bishop of Liverpool, was attended by past and present Liverpool players, including Robbie Fowler, Steve McManaman and Alan Hansen. According to the BBC report: "The names of the victims were read from the memorial book and floral tributes were laid at a plaque bearing their names." A gospel choir performed and the ceremony ended with a rendition of "You'll Never Walk Alone". The anniversary was also marked by a minute's silence at the weekend's league games and FA Cup semi-finals.

=== 20th anniversary ===
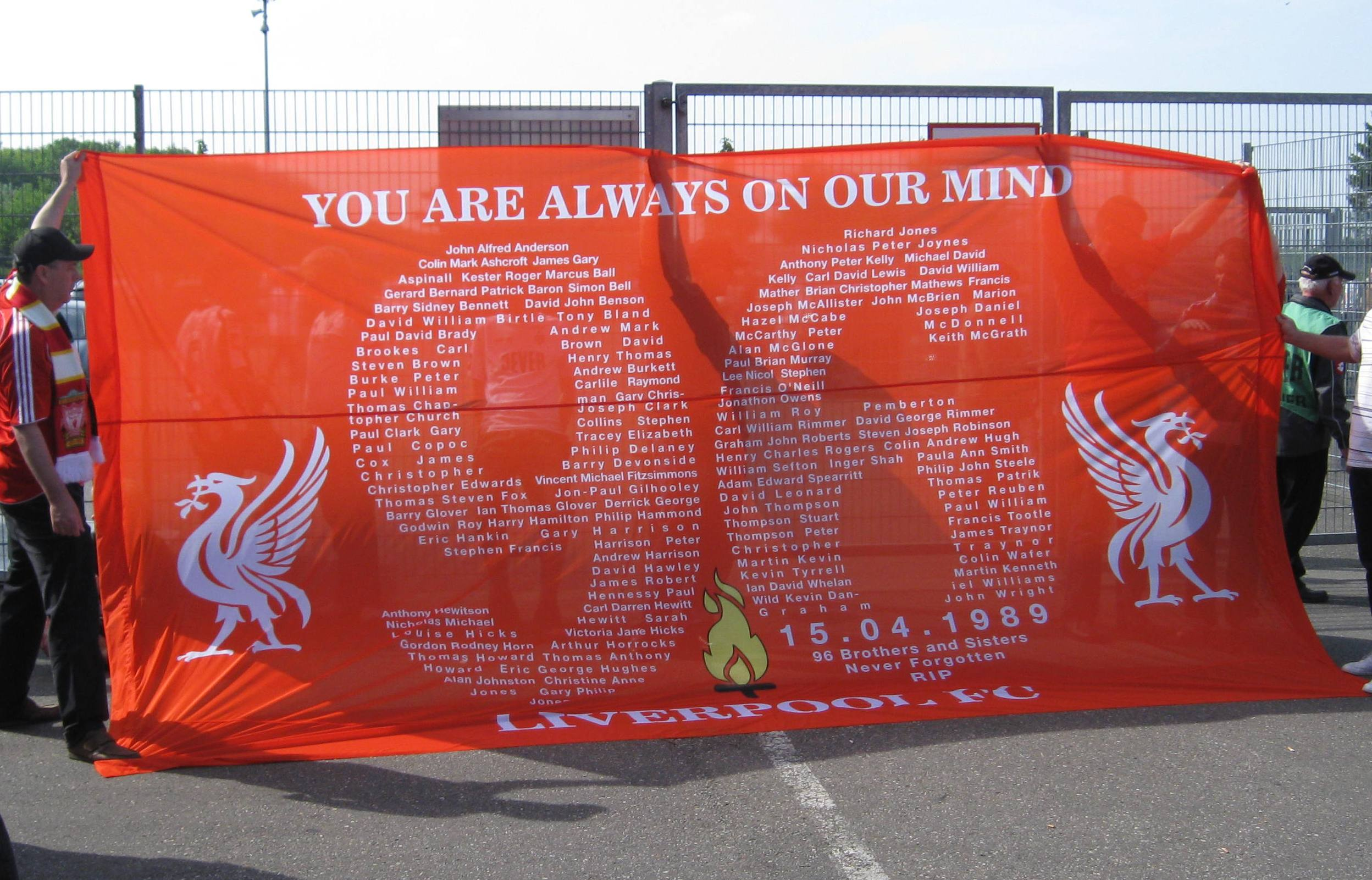
Liverpool fans unfurl a banner displaying the names of the deceased on the 20th anniversary of the disaster.

In 2009, on the 20th anniversary of the disaster, Liverpool's request that their Champions League quarter-finals return leg, scheduled for 15 April, be played the day before was granted.

The event was remembered with a ceremony at Anfield attended by over 28,000 people. The Kop, Centenary and Main Stands were opened to the public before part of the Anfield Road End was opened to supporters. The memorial service, led by the bishop of Liverpool began at 14:45 BST and a two-minute silence (observed across Liverpool and in Sheffield and Nottingham, including public transport coming to a stand-still) was held at the time of the disaster twenty years earlier, 15:06 BST. Burnham, by then the Sports Minister, addressed the crowd but was heckled by supporters chanting "Justice for the 96". The ceremony was attended by survivors of the disaster, families of victims and the Liverpool team, with goalkeeper Pepe Reina leading the team and management staff onto the pitch. Team captain Steven Gerrard and vice-captain Jamie Carragher handed the freedom of the city to the families of all the victims. Candles were lit for each of the 96 people who died. Kenny Dalglish, Liverpool's manager at the time of the disaster, read a passage from the Bible, "Lamentations of Jeremiah". The Liverpool manager, Rafael Benítez, set 96 balloons free. The ceremony ended with 96 rings of church bells across the city and a rendition of "You'll Never Walk Alone".

Other services took place at the same time, including at the Anglican Liverpool Cathedral and the Roman Catholic Liverpool Metropolitan Cathedral. After the two-minute silence, bells on civic buildings rang out throughout Merseyside.

A song was released to mark the 20th anniversary, entitled "Fields of Anfield Road", which peaked at number 14 in the UK charts.

Liverpool, Chelsea, Arsenal, and Manchester United players showed respect by wearing black armbands during their Champions League quarter-final matches on 14 and 15 April 2009.

On 14 May, more than 20,000 people packed Anfield for a match held in memory of the victims. The Liverpool Legends, comprising ex-Liverpool footballers beat the All Stars, captained by actor Ricky Tomlinson, 3–1. The event also raised cash for the Marina Dalglish Appeal which was contributed towards a radiotherapy centre at University Hospital in Aintree.

With the imminent release of police documents relating to events on 15 April 1989, the Hillsborough Family Support Group launched Project 96, a fundraising initiative on 1 August 2009. At least 96 current and former Liverpool footballers are being lined up to raise £96,000 by auctioning a limited edition (of 96) signed photographs.

On 11 April 2009, Liverpool fans sang "You'll Never Walk Alone" as a tribute to the upcoming anniversary of the disaster before the home game against Blackburn Rovers (which ended in Liverpool winning 4–0) and was followed by former Liverpool player Stephen Warnock presenting a memorial wreath to the Kop showing the figure 96 in red flowers.

=== Other tributes ===
The Hillsborough disaster touched not only Liverpool, but football clubs in England and around the world. Supporters of Everton, Liverpool's traditional local rivals, were affected, many of them having lost friends and family. Supporters laid down flowers and blue and white scarves to show respect for the dead and unity with fellow Merseysiders.

On 19 April 1989, four days after the disaster, the second leg of the European Cup semi-final tie between AC Milan and Real Madrid was played. The referee blew his whistle two minutes into the game to stop play and a minute's silence was held for those who lost their lives at Hillsborough. Halfway through the minute's silence, the Milan fans sang Liverpool's "You'll Never Walk Alone" as a sign of respect. In April 1989, Bradford City and Lincoln City held a friendly match to benefit the victims of Hillsborough. The occasion was the first in which the two teams had met since the 1985 Bradford City stadium fire that had claimed 56 lives at Valley Parade.

On 30 April 1989, a friendly match organised by Celtic F.C. was played at Celtic Park, Glasgow, between the home club and Liverpool. This game was Liverpool's first appearance on the football field since the disaster two weeks earlier. The crowd numbered more than 60,000, including around 6,000 Liverpool fans, and all the match proceeds went to the Hillsborough appeal fund. Liverpool won the match by four goals to nil.

As a result of the disaster, Liverpool's scheduled match against Arsenal was delayed from 23 April until the end of the season, and the game eventually decided the league title. At the rescheduled fixture, Arsenal players brought flowers onto the pitch and presented them to the Liverpool fans around the stadium before the game commenced.

During a 2011 debate in the House of Commons, the Labour MP for Liverpool Walton, Steve Rotheram, read out a list of the victims and, as a result, the names were recorded in the Hansard transcripts.

In December 2021, Liverpool City Council nominated Andrew Devine posthumously for the freedom of the city of Liverpool, a tribute given to the original 96 victims in 2016.

== Controversies ==
=== Media portrayal ===
Initial media coverage – spurred by what Phil Scraton calls in Hillsborough: The Truth "the Heysel factor" and "hooligan hysteria" – began to shift the blame onto the behaviour of the Liverpool fans at the stadium, making it a public order issue. As well as The Sun's 19 April 1989 "The Truth" article (see below) other newspapers published similar allegations; the Daily Star headline on the same day reported "Dead fans robbed by drunk thugs"; the Daily Mail accused the Liverpool fans of being "drunk and violent and their actions were vile", and The Daily Express ran a story alleging that "Police saw 'sick spectacle of pilfering from the dying'." Peter McKay in the Evening Standard wrote that the "catastrophe was caused first and foremost by violent enthusiasm for soccer and in this case the tribal passions of Liverpool supporters [who] literally killed themselves and others to be at the game" and published a front-page headline "Police attack 'vile' fans" on 18 April 1989, in which police sources blamed the behaviour of a section of Liverpool fans for the disaster.

In Liverpool local journalist John Williams of the Liverpool Daily Post wrote in an article titled "I Blame the Yobs" that "The gatecrashers wreaked their fatal havoc ... Their uncontrolled fanaticism and mass hysteria ... literally squeezed the life out of men, women and children ... yobbism at its most base ... Scouse killed Scouse for no better reason than 22 men were kicking a ball".

In other regional newspapers, the Manchester Evening News wrote that the "Anfield Army charged on to the terrace behind the goal – many without tickets", and the Yorkshire Post wrote that the "trampling crush" had been started by "thousands of fans" who were "latecomers ... forc[ing] their way into the ground". The Sheffield Star published similar allegations to The Sun, running the headline "Fans in Drunken Attacks on Police".

Many of the more serious allegations – such as stealing from the dead and assault of police officers and rescue workers – appeared on 18 April, although several evening newspapers published on 15 April 1989 also gave inaccurate reporting of the disaster, as these newspapers went to press before the full extent or circumstances of the disaster had been confirmed or even reported. This included the Wolverhampton-based Express & Star, which reported that the match had been cancelled as a result of a "pitch invasion in which many fans were injured". This article was presumably published before there were any reports that people had been killed. These media reports and others were examined during the 2012 Hillsborough Independent Panel report.

==== The Sun ====
The false allegations printed on the front page of The Sun, 19 April 1989

On 19 April, four days after the disaster, Kelvin MacKenzie, editor of The Sun, ordered "The Truth" as the front-page headline, followed by three sub-headlines: "Some fans picked pockets of victims", "Some fans urinated on the brave cops" and "Some fans beat up PC giving kiss of life". Mackenzie reportedly spent two hours deciding on which headline to run; his original instinct being for "You Scum" before eventually deciding on "The Truth".

The information was provided to the newspaper by Whites Press Agency, a news agency in Sheffield; the newspaper cited claims by police inspector Gordon Sykes, that Liverpool fans had pickpocketed the dead, as well as other claims by unnamed police officers and local Conservative MP Irvine Patnick. The Daily Express also carried Patnick's version, under the headline "Police Accuse Drunken Fans" which gave Patnick's views, saying he had told Margaret Thatcher, while escorting her on a tour of the ground after the disaster, of the "mayhem caused by drunks" and that policemen told him they were "hampered, harassed, punched and kicked".

The story accompanying The Sun headlines claimed "drunken Liverpool fans viciously attacked rescue workers as they tried to revive victims" and "police officers, firemen and ambulance crew were punched, kicked and urinated upon". A quotation, attributed to an unnamed policeman, claimed a partially unclothed dead girl had been verbally abused, and that Liverpool fans were "openly urinating on us and the bodies of the dead". In fact many Liverpool fans helped security personnel stretcher away victims and gave first aid to the injured. The Guardian later wrote that "The claim that supporters higher up the Leppings Lane terrace had urinated on police pulling bodies out of the crush appeared to have roots in the fact that those who were dying or sustaining serious injuries suffered compression asphyxia and many involuntarily urinated, vomited and emptied their bowels as they were crushed."

In their history of The Sun, Peter Chippendale and Chris Horrie wrote:

As MacKenzie's layout was seen by more and more people, a collective shudder ran through the office (but) MacKenzie's dominance was so total there was nobody left in the organisation who could rein him in except Murdoch. (Everyone in the office) seemed paralysed – "looking like rabbits in the headlights" – as one hack described them. The error staring them in the face was too glaring. It obviously wasn't a silly mistake; nor was it a simple oversight. Nobody really had any comment on it – they just took one look and went away shaking their heads in wonder at the enormity of it. It was a 'classic smear'.

MacKenzie maintained for years that his "only mistake was to believe a Tory MP". In 1993, he told a House of Commons committee, "I regret Hillsborough. It was a fundamental mistake. The mistake was I believed what an MP said", but privately said at a 2006 dinner that he had only apologised under the instruction of Rupert Murdoch, believing: "all I did wrong was tell the truth ... I was not sorry then and I'm not sorry now". On Question Time the next year, MacKenzie publicly repeated the claims he said at the dinner; he said that he believed some of the material they published in The Sun but was not sure about all of it.

Widespread boycotts of the newspaper throughout Merseyside followed immediately and continue to this day. Boycotts include both customers refusing to purchase it, and retailers refusing to stock it. The Financial Times reported in 2019 that Merseyside sales were estimated to drop from 55,000 per day to 12,000 per day, an 80% decrease. Chris Horrie estimated in 2014 that the tabloid's owners had lost £15 million per month since the disaster, in 1989 prices. The Hillsborough Justice Campaign organised a less successful national boycott that had some impact on the paper's sales nationally.

In 2004, after Wayne Rooney gave exclusive interviews to The Sun, causing backlash in Liverpool, The Sun ran a front-page story apologising for "the most terrible mistake in its history", saying "We long ago apologised publicly ... We gladly say sorry again today: fully, openly, honestly and without reservation". It said criticism of Rooney was wrong and co-ordinated by the Liverpool Echo and Liverpool Post. The Liverpool Echo condemned the apology as "cynical and shameless". In 2012, under the headline "The Real Truth", The Sun made a front-page apology, saying "we are profoundly sorry for false reports". The editor at the time, Dominic Mohan, wrote: "We published an inaccurate and offensive story about the events at Hillsborough. We said it was the truth – it wasn't ... for that we're deeply ashamed and profoundly sorry". Following the second inquest in 2016, The Sun's eighth and ninth pages carried images of the 96 victims and an editorial which apologised "unreservedly", saying "the police smeared [supporters] with a pack of lies which in 1989 the Sun and other media swallowed whole". A lengthier apology was published online.

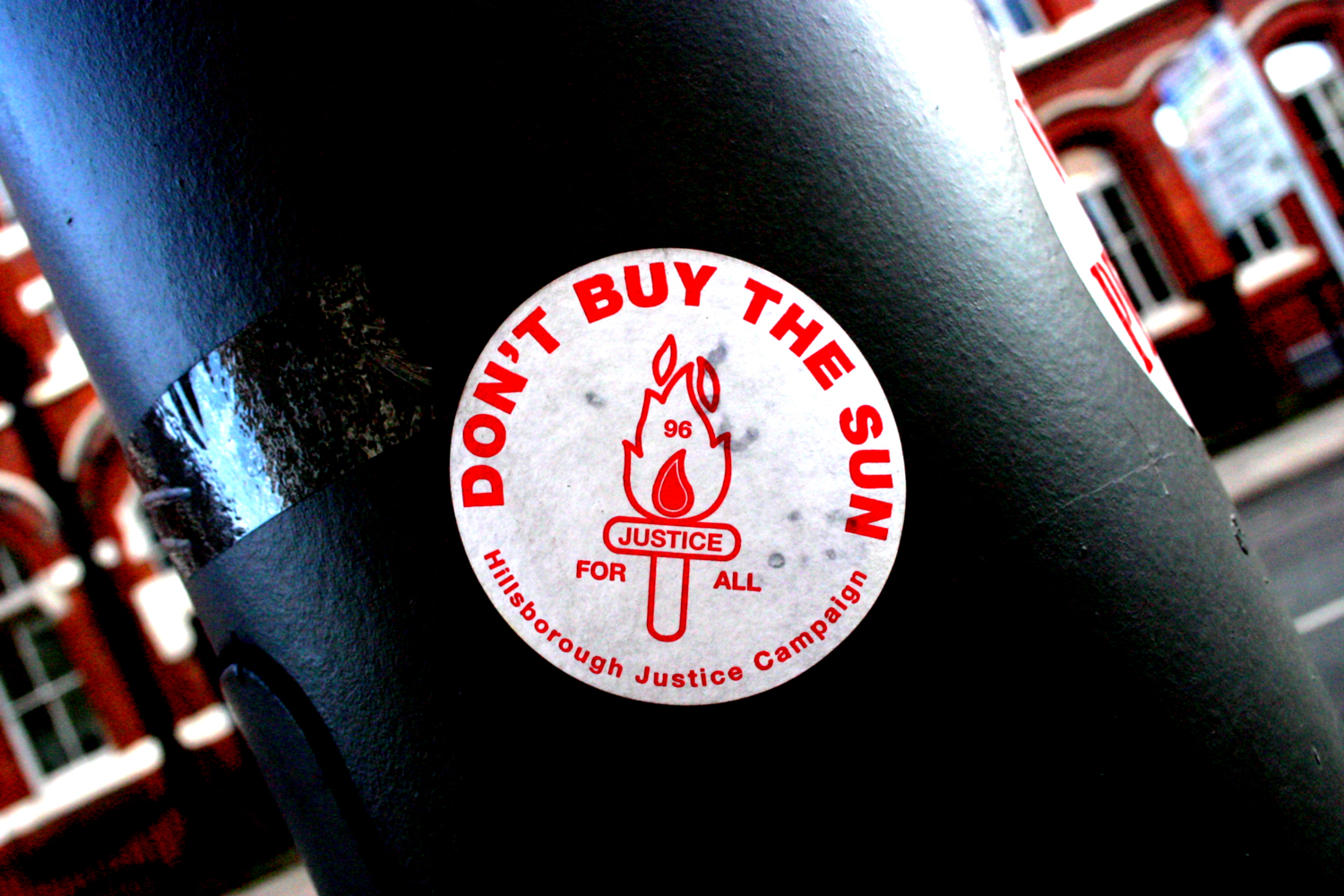
Sticker urging the Liverpool public not to purchase The Sun

James Murdoch made a full apology for The Sun's coverage when he appeared at a hearing of the House of Commons Select committee dealing with the News International phone hacking scandal in 2012.

On 12 September 2012, after the publication of the report exonerating the Liverpool fans, MacKenzie issued the following statement:

Today I offer my profuse apologies to the people of Liverpool for that headline. I too was totally misled. Twenty-three years ago I was handed a piece of copy from a reputable news agency in Sheffield, in which a senior police officer and a senior local MP were making serious allegations against fans in the stadium. I had absolutely no reason to believe that these authority figures would lie and deceive over such a disaster. As the prime minister has made clear, these allegations were wholly untrue and were part of a concerted plot by police officers to discredit the supporters thereby shifting the blame for the tragedy from themselves. It has taken more than two decades, 400,000 documents and a two-year inquiry to discover to my horror that it would have been far more accurate had I written the headline The Lies rather than The Truth. I published in good faith and I am sorry that it was so wrong.

In response, Trevor Hicks, chairman of the Hillsborough Family Support Group, rejected MacKenzie's apology as "too little, too late", calling him "lowlife, clever lowlife, but lowlife". A press conference held by families of the victims also banned all Sun reporters from entering, with a sign on the door reading "NO ENTRY TO SUN JOURNALISTS".

Following the April 2016 verdict of unlawful killing, The Sun and the first print edition of the Times (both owned by News International), did not cover the stories on their front pages, with The Sun relegating the story to pages 8 and 9. An apology appeared on page 10, reiterating previous statements that the 1989 headline had been an error of judgement.

The coverage was widely condemned on social media, with Twitter users saying that this reflected "Murdoch's view on Hillsborough", which was a "smear", which "now daren't speak its name". On the night of the verdict coverage, more than 124,000 tweets used the term The Sun.

However, on Sky News, The Sun's Political Editor Tom Newton Dunn defended this decision, saying: "I don't think it should all be about The Sun – it was not us who committed Hillsborough." Trevor Kavanagh, the political editor at the time of the Hillsborough disaster, said that he was "not sorry at all" about the reporting and supported his former boss Kelvin MacKenzie, stating that "we were clearly misled about the events and the authorities, including the police, actively concealed the truth".

In February 2017, Liverpool F.C. issued a ban on The Sun journalists from entering their grounds in response to the coverage of Hillsborough by the newspaper. Everton F.C. followed in April 2017 on the eve of the 28th anniversary of the disaster after a column by Kelvin MacKenzie concerning Everton footballer Ross Barkley. MacKenzie was suspended as a contributor to the newspaper.

==== The Times ====
The journalist Edward Pearce was criticised for writing a controversial article in the aftermath of the disaster, at a time when a number of victims' funerals were taking place. His column in The Sunday Times on 23 April 1989, included the text:

For the second time in half a decade a large body of Liverpool supporters has killed people ... the shrine in the Anfield goalmouth, the cursing of the police, all the theatricals, come sweetly to a city which is already the world capital of self-pity. There are soapy politicians to make a pet of Liverpool, and Liverpool itself is always standing by to make a pet of itself. 'Why us? Why are we treated like animals?' To which the plain answer is that a good and sufficient minority of you behave like animals.

Pearce went on to reflect that if South Yorkshire Police bore any responsibility, it was "for not realising what brutes they had to handle."

Phil Scraton described Pearce's comments as amongst the "most bigoted and factually inaccurate" published in the wake of the disaster. A number of complaints were made to the Press Council concerning the article, but the council ruled that it was unable to adjudicate on comment pieces, though the council noted that tragedy or disaster is not an occasion for writers to exercise gratuitous provocation.

On 27 April 2016, Times staffers in the sports department expressed their outrage over the paper's decision to cover 26 April inquest, which ruled that the 96 dead were unlawfully killed, only on an inside spread and the sports pages, with some in the newspaper claiming there was a "mutiny" in the sports department. The Times later tweeted that "We made a mistake with the front page of our first edition, and we fixed it for our second edition."

The Times was the only major UK newspaper not to give the story front-page coverage other than fellow News UK-owned Sun. Gary Lineker described the incident as "disgusting as it is unsurprising", and David Walsh, chief sports writer at the Sunday Times, said it was a "shocking misjudgment" to not include this story on the front page. However, insiders dismissed any suggestion that a visit by News UK owner Rupert Murdoch to the Times newsroom on the day of the verdict had anything to do with the editorial decision.

==== FHM Australia ====
The November 2002 edition of the men's lifestyle magazine FHM in Australia was withdrawn from sale soon after its publication, and a public apology made in the Australian and British editions, because it contained jokes mocking the disaster. As a result, Emap Australia, who owned FHM at the time, pledged to make a donation to the families of the victims. Although the original apology was not printed in the magazine as it was not considered "serious enough", its Australian editor, Geoff Campbell, released a statement: "We deeply regret the photograph captions published in the November issue of the Australian edition of FHM, accompanying an article about the Hillsborough disaster of 1989. The right course of action is to withdraw this edition from sale – which we will be doing. We have been in contact with the Hillsborough Family Support Group and the Hillsborough Justice Campaign to express our deep regret and sincere apologies." The British edition disassociated itself from the controversy, stating: "FHM Australia has its own editorial team and these captions were written and published without consultation with the UK edition, or any other edition of FHM."

The vice-chairman of the Hillsborough Family Support Group, Philip Hammond, said he wanted all football fans to boycott the magazine, saying, "I am going to write to every fanzine in the country – including Liverpool F.C.'s – telling them to ban FHM. People are very upset by it. I think there will be a real boycott." He added it would be like making jokes about the 2002 Bali bombings, in which 88 Australians were killed.

==== The Spectator ====
The Spectator was criticised for an editorial which appeared in the magazine on 16 October 2004 following the death of British hostage Kenneth John "Ken" Bigley in Iraq, in which it was claimed that the response to Bigley's killing was fuelled by the fact he was from Liverpool, and went on to criticise the "drunken" fans at Hillsborough and call on them to accept responsibility for their "role" in the disaster:

The extreme reaction to Mr Bigley's murder is fed by the fact that he was a Liverpudlian. Liverpool is a handsome city with a tribal sense of community. A combination of economic misfortune – its docks were, fundamentally, on the wrong side of England when Britain entered what is now the European Union – and an excessive predilection for welfarism have created a peculiar, and deeply unattractive, psyche among many Liverpudlians. They see themselves whenever possible as victims, and resent their victim status; yet at the same time they wallow in it. Part of this flawed psychological state is that they cannot accept that they might have made any contribution to their misfortunes, but seek rather to blame someone else for it, thereby deepening their sense of shared tribal grievance against the rest of society. The deaths of more than 50 Liverpool football supporters at Hillsborough in 1989 was undeniably a greater tragedy than the single death, however horrible, of Mr Bigley; but that is no excuse for Liverpool's failure to acknowledge, even to this day, the part played in the disaster by drunken fans at the back of the crowd who mindlessly tried to fight their way into the ground that Saturday afternoon. The police became a convenient scapegoat, and the Sun newspaper a whipping-boy for daring, albeit in a tasteless fashion, to hint at the wider causes of the incident.

Although the editor Boris Johnson did not write this piece, journalist Simon Heffer said he had written the first draft of the article at Johnson's request. Johnson apologised at the time of the article, travelling to Liverpool to do so, and again following the publication of the report of the Hillsborough Independent Panel in 2012; Johnson's apology was rejected by Margaret Aspinall, chair of the Hillsborough Family Support Group, whose son James, 18, died in the disaster:

What he has got to understand is that we were speaking the truth for 23 years and apologies have only started to come today from them because of yesterday. It's too little, too late. It's fine to apologise afterwards. They just don't want their names in any more sleaze. No, his apology doesn't mean a thing to me.

The Spectator's comments were widely circulated following the April 2016 verdict by the Hillsborough inquest's second hearing proving unlawful killing of the 96 dead at Hillsborough.

=== EastEnders ===
In November 2007, the BBC soap opera EastEnders caused controversy when the character Minty Peterson (played by Cliff Parisi) made a reference to the disaster. During the episode car mechanic Minty said: "Five years out of Europe because of Heysel, because they penned you lot in to stop you fighting on the pitch and then what did we end up with? Hillsborough." This prompted 380 complaints and the BBC apologised, saying that the character was simply reminding another character, former football hooligan Jase Dyer, that the actions of hooligans led to the fencing-in of football fans. Ofcom also received 177 complaints.

=== Charles Itandje ===
Liverpool goalkeeper Charles Itandje was accused of having shown disrespect towards the Hillsborough victims during the 2009 remembrance ceremony, as he was spotted on camera "smiling and nudging" teammate Damien Plessis. He was suspended from the club for a fortnight and many fans felt he should not play for the club again. He was omitted from the first team squad and never played for the club in any capacity again.

=== Jeremy Hunt ===
On 28 June 2010, following England's departure from the 2010 FIFA World Cup in South Africa, the UK's Culture and Sport Secretary Jeremy Hunt praised the England fans for their behaviour during the competition, saying "I mean, not a single arrest for a football-related offence, and the terrible problems that we had in Heysel and Hillsborough in the 1980s seem now to be behind us." He later apologised and said "I know that fan unrest played no part in the terrible events of April 1989 and I apologise to Liverpool fans and the families of those killed and injured in the Hillsborough disaster if my comments caused any offence." Margaret Aspinall, chair of the Hillsborough Family Support Group, asked for a face to face meeting with Hunt before deciding if she would accept the apology.

=== Fans' chants ===
Fans of rival clubs have been known to chant about the Hillsborough disaster at football matches, in order to upset Liverpool fans. Following the findings of the Independent Panel in September 2012, Alex Ferguson and two Manchester United fan groups called for an end to the "sick chants". Leeds United chairman Ken Bates endorsed this call in the club programme and stated, "Leeds have suffered at times with reference to Galatasaray; some of our so-called fans have also been guilty as well, particularly in relation to Munich." There in reference to the deaths of eight Manchester United players in the Munich air disaster of 1958.

=== Oliver Popplewell ===
In October 2011, Sir Oliver Popplewell, who had chaired the public inquiry into the 1985 Bradford City stadium fire at Valley Parade that killed 56 people, called on the families of the Hillsborough victims to look at the "quiet dignity and great courage relatives in the West Yorkshire city had shown in the years following the tragedy". He said of the Bradford families: "They did not harbour conspiracy theories. They did not seek endless further inquiries. They buried their dead, comforted the bereaved and succoured the injured. They organised a sensible compensation scheme and moved on. Is there, perhaps, a lesson there for the Hillsborough campaigners?"

Popplewell was criticised for the comments, including a rebuke from a survivor of the Bradford fire. Labour MP Steve Rotheram, commented: "How insensitive does somebody have to be to write that load of drivel?"

=== David Crompton ===
In 2013, a formal complaint was made against David Crompton, South Yorkshire's chief constable, over internal emails relating to the Hillsborough disaster. On 8 September 2012, just four days before the Hillsborough Independent Panel Report was published, Crompton had emailed the force's assistant chief constable Andy Holt and head of media Mark Thompson. In the email, which came to light as the result of a Freedom of Information request, Crompton had said that the families' "version of certain events has become 'the truth' even though it isn't". South Yorkshire's police and crime commissioner Shaun Wright appointed chief constable Simon Parr of Cambridgeshire Constabulary to head an investigation into the matter. Wright said: "The request has been submitted by a firm of solicitors in Liverpool acting on behalf of a number of individuals affected by the event."

In March 2016, Crompton announced that he would retire in November. On 26 April 2016, after the inquest jury delivered a verdict affirming all the charges against the police, Crompton "unequivocally accepted" the verdicts, including unlawful killing, said that the police operation at the stadium on the day of the disaster had been "catastrophically wrong", and apologised unreservedly. Following continued criticism of Crompton in the wake of the unlawful killing verdict, South Yorkshire Police and Crime Commissioner Alan Billings suspended Crompton from duty on 27 April 2016.

=== Civil servant ===
In June 2014, an unnamed 24-year-old British civil servant was sacked for posting offensive comments about the disaster on Wikipedia.

=== Steven Cohen ===
In 2009, nearly twenty years to the day after the disaster, Steven Cohen, a presenter on Fox Soccer Channel and Sirius Satellite Radio in the United States (an Englishman and Chelsea fan), stated on his radio show that Liverpool fans "without tickets" were the "root cause" and "perpetrators" of the disaster. A boycott of advertisers by American Liverpool fans eventually brought about an apology from him. Despite this he was replaced as presenter of Fox Football Fone-in. His actions were disowned by Chelsea Football Club and he no longer works as a broadcaster.

=== Bernard Ingham ===
In 1996, Sir Bernard Ingham, former press secretary to former prime minister Margaret Thatcher, caused controversy with his comments about the disaster. In a letter addressed to a victim's parent, Ingham wrote that the disaster was caused by "tanked up yobs". In another letter written to a Liverpool supporter, also written in 1996, Ingham remarked that people should "shut up about Hillsborough". On the day of the inquest verdict, Ingham refused to apologise or respond to the previous comments he made, telling a reporter, "I have nothing to say." There have since been calls to have Ingham stripped of his knighthood.

=== Topman ===
In March 2018, British clothing retailer Topman marketed a T-shirt which was interpreted by members of the public, including relatives of Hillsborough victims, as mocking the disaster. The T-shirt was red with white details like a Liverpool shirt, and had the number 96 on the back like a football shirt, with the text "Karma" and "What goes around comes back around", and a white rose, as associated with Yorkshire. Topman stated that the T-shirt was in reference to a Bob Marley song re-released in 1996 and apologised and withdrew the item.

== Radio, television and theatre ==
=== 1989: After Dark (TV discussion programme) ===
On 20 May 1989, five weeks after the disaster, Channel 4's After Dark programme broadcast an extended live discussion called "Football – The Final Whistle?". Among the guests were bereaved father James Delaney and his wife Eileen, who said "they didn't give the poor people who were killed any dignity ... I bent down to kiss and talk to [my son] and as we stood up there was a policeman who came from behind me ... trying to usher myself and my husband out ... I had to scream at the police officer to allow us privacy ... the total attitude was, you've identified number 33 so go!"

Further extracts from what Eileen Delaney said on the programme can be found on the Hillsborough Justice Campaign website and in Phil Scraton's book Hillsborough: The Truth.

=== 1994: The Cook Report ===
In 1994, Roger Cook led an investigation into the Hillsborough disaster in series 9, episode 3 of The Cook Report, titled "Kevin's Mum".

=== 1996: Hillsborough (TV drama) ===
A television drama, based on the disaster and subsequent events, titled simply Hillsborough, was produced by Granada Television in 1996. It won the BAFTA Award for Best Single Drama in 1997. The cast included Christopher Eccleston, Annabelle Apsion, Ricky Tomlinson and Mark Womack. The film was aired for the first time in 1996, and has been shown four times since then: in 1998, in 2009, in September 2012 (shortly after the release of the findings of the Hillsborough Independent Panel), and again on 1 May 2016 on ITV.

=== 2009: The Reunion (Radio discussion programme) ===
On the 20th anniversary of the disaster, BBC Radio 4 produced an episode of their series The Reunion on the subject of Hillsborough. Sue MacGregor brought together a group of people who were involved in the disaster to talk about the events of that day at a time when they were still in the midst of their fight for justice. The programme was repeated on 1 May 2016, at the end of the week in which the Hillsborough inquest ruled that the 96 Liverpool football fans died unlawfully.

=== 2014: Hillsborough (TV documentary) ===
The American sports network ESPN produced the documentary Hillsborough as part of its 30 for 30 series of sports films (under a new "Soccer Stories" subdivision). Directed by Daniel Gordon and co-produced with the BBC, the two-hour film chronicles the disaster, the investigations, and their lingering effects; it also includes interviews with survivors, victims' relatives, police officers and investigators. Hillsborough first aired in the US on 15 April 2014, the 25th anniversary of the disaster.

As the documentary included previously unreleased security camera footage from the stadium on the day of the disaster, it could not be shown in the UK upon initial release due to the 2012 High Court inquest still being in progress. After the inquest verdict, the BBC aired the documentary on 8 May 2016, with additional footage from the inquest, as well as its final verdict.

=== 2022: Anne (TV drama) ===
Anne is a four-part docudrama about Anne Williams' campaign to reveal the truth about her son's death, which aired on ITV in January 2022. Williams was portrayed by Maxine Peake, whose performance was described in The Guardian as "almost unwatchably intense".

=== Stage plays ===
Two British stage plays also dealt with the disaster with different viewpoints:

- Jonathan Harvey's Guiding Star showed a father coming to terms with what had happened some years later.
- Lance Nielsen wrote Waiting for Hillsborough about two Liverpool families waiting for news of their missing loved ones on the day, which leads to discussion of football safety and the culture of blame. Nielsen's play won him an award at the 1999 Liverpool Arts and Entertainment awards and was highly praised by the Liverpool press.

== See also ==
- Kanjuruhan Stadium disaster – a 2022 disaster in Indonesia involving tear gas being used against supporters
- Karaiskakis Stadium disaster – a 1981 stadium disaster in Greece
- List of disasters in Great Britain and Ireland by death toll
