= Telford FM =

Coordinates: 52.69997°N 2.519917°W

107.4 Telford FM

England
- Broadcast area: Telford, England
- Frequency: 107.4 MHz

Programming
- Format: Adult Contemporary

Ownership
- Owner: Midland News Association (MNA)

History
- First air date: 3 May 1999
- Last air date: 20 September 2010

107.4 Telford FM was an Independent Local Radio station broadcasting in Telford, Shropshire and the surrounding areas of Bridgnorth and Newport from 3 May 1999 until 20 September 2010.

In 2010, the station was later renamed as 'The Severn' to match their sister station and it began to broadcast for more areas in Shropshire. The management and studio location stayed the same during this time.

== See also ==
- Shropshire Star
- The Severn
- The Wyre

== MNA Broadcasting Websites ==
- 106.5, 107.1 & 107.4 FM | The Severn - For Shrewsbury, North Shropshire and Telford & Wrekin
- 107.2 FM | The Wyre - For North Worcestershire (Wyre Forest District)
- MNA Broadcasting - MNA Broadcasting website
