= Bert McGee =

Previous chairman of Sheffield Wednesday F.C

- Born: Herbert Edward McGee; 11 August 1917; Ecclesall, Yorkshire
- Died: May 1995
- Occupation: Sheffield Wednesday chairman

Herbert Edward McGee OBE (11 August 1917 – May 1995) was a chairman of Sheffield Wednesday Football Club.

In April 1984, as Chairman of Sheffield Wednesday, McGee advised Sheffield Wednesday fans not to travel to Ninian Park for a game against Cardiff City F.C. because he felt Cardiff were attempting to cash in by charging higher ticket prices against promotion candidates Wednesday. Cardiff were charging £2.50 to Cardiff fans and those who bought tickets in advance but £3 to Wednesday fans.

McGee was the chairman of the club at the time of the Hillsborough disaster. He resigned from his position as chairman soon after and was replaced by Dave Richards.

McGee was appointed an OBE in 1991 for services to Sheffield.
