= The Wyre =

Coordinates: 52.386395°N 2.247356°W

England
- Broadcast area: Kidderminster, Bewdley, Stourport-on-Severn, and Stourbridge
- Frequency: 107.2 MHz

Programming
- Format: AC

Ownership
- Owner: UTV Radio

History
- First air date: 12 September 2005
- Last air date: 26 March 2012

107.2 The Wyre was an Independent Local Radio station serving Kidderminster, Bewdley, Stourport-on-Severn, Stourbridge and Bromsgrove in England. The station was owned by MNA Broadcasting but was sold to UTV Media and merged on Monday 26 March 2012 with The Severn and 107.7 The Wolf to form Signal 107, a station also serving the Wolverhampton, Shropshire and north Worcestershire area.

== History ==
Originally launched in September 2005 by the Midlands News Association (MNA Broadcasting). After three years, The Wyre gained permission from OFCOM to leave its Kidderminster studios and co-locate with Telford FM in Shropshire.

On 3 February 2012 The Wyre, together with sister station The Severn, were acquired by UTV Media. Live programming ended on the same day on both stations. The station was rebranded as Signal 107 at midday on Monday 26 March 2012 and merged with The Severn & 107.7 The Wolf.

== See also ==
- UTV Radio
- 107.7 The Wolf
- The Severn
- Signal 107
