= Shropshire Star =

Newspaper based in Shropshire, England

- Type: Daily regional newspaper
- Owner: Midland News Association
- Editor: Mark Drew
- Founded: 5 October 1964
- Headquarters: Head office: Midland News Association, 51-53 Queen Street, Wolverhampton, WV1 1ES
- Circulation: 7,551 (as of 2024)
- Sister newspapers: Express & Star
- Website: shropshirestar.com

The Shropshire Star is an English regional newspaper and reputedly the twelfth biggest-selling regional newspaper in the UK. It is based at Grosvenor House, Telford, where it covers the whole of Shropshire plus parts of Herefordshire, Worcestershire, Staffordshire, Cheshire and Mid Wales. It is printed by Newsquest at their Deeside office.

Currently edited by Mark Drew, the Shropshire Star publishes daily, except for Sunday. In the first half of 2012, the newspaper had a daily circulation of 49,751. Ten years later paid print circulation had fallen by 80% to less than 10,000 (ABC Jan-Jun 2023). In 2023, in an attempt to reverse its declining fortunes the newspaper began the process to monetize its online views by placing the majority of its news content behind a paywall.

The Shropshire Star was under the ownership of the Graham family from its inception to September 2023. The Shropshire Star is published by the Midland News Association (MNA), which also owns the Express & Star newspaper.

== History ==
The Shropshire Star has been in circulation since Monday 5 October 1964, inheriting a nightly circulation of around 19,000 from the old Shropshire edition of the Express & Star.

The Midland News Association board saw an opportunity with the growth of Dawley New Town - later renamed Telford - and produced a successful news and advertising product to serve a county which is a mixture of agriculture and industrial areas.

It was the first British newspaper to bring readers colour pictures of the Moon landing in 1969. In the mid-1980s the Shropshire Star became one of the first newspapers in Britain to introduce an editorial computer system, following in the footsteps of its sister paper the Express & Star which was the first, in 1980.

The Shropshire Star later became the first evening newspaper in Europe to use web-fed offset printing, which refers to the use of rolls (or webs) of paper supplied to the printing press.

In September 2023, the paper was sold by the family-owned Claverley Group to National World.

== Online media ==
The Shropshire Star publishes breaking news and sport content online each day, in addition to regular blogs and unique video content. Its website, shropshirestar.com, was launched in 1997.

A Shropshire Star App for iPad and iPhone was launched in January 2012, using page-turning technology to mimic the look and feel of the actual newspaper.

August 2012 saw the website re-launched in a responsive web design alongside its sister title expressandstar.com – believed to be the first of any other regional newspaper websites in the UK.

By 2015, the term Shropshire Star was being inputted into search engines more than 200,000 times per calendar month, which made it the most popular search string with the word Shropshire in the request.

== Editors ==
- Ted Ireland (1964-1971)
- Mark Kersen (1971-1972)
- Keith Parker (1972–1977)
- Robert Jones (1977–1991)
- Warren Wilson (1991–1995)
- Andy Wright (1995–1998)
- Adrian Faber (1998–2002)
- Sarah-Jane Smith (2002–2011)
- Keith Harrison (2011–2013)
- Martin Wright (2013–2024)
- Mark Drew (2024 to present)

== Notable journalists ==
- Jeremy Clarkson wrote his first motoring articles for this paper. He recalled: "I started small, on the Shropshire Star with little Peugeots and Fiats and worked my way up to Ford Granadas and Rovers, until, after about seven years, I was allowed to drive an Aston Martin Lagonda."
- Bernard Falk was one of the founder members of the original reporting team, and went on to become a household name on television and radio.

== Editions ==
- Two different editions: East zone (covering Telford, Market Drayton, Newport, Bridgnorth) and west zone (covering Shrewsbury, Oswestry, Ludlow and into mid-Wales)

== See also ==
- Midland News Association
- Express and Star
- North Shropshire Chronicle
- Shrewsbury Chronicle
