= Shrewsbury Chronicle =

Newspaper in Shrewsbury, England

- Type: Weekly newspaper
- Owner: Midland News Association
- Editor: Caroline Jones
- Founded: 23 November 1772
- Headquarters: 7 Bellstone, Shrewsbury, SY1 1HU
- Circulation: 25,521 (as of 2022)
- Website: shrewsburychronicle.com

The Shrewsbury Chronicle is a local news newspaper in Shrewsbury, Shropshire, England. It is one of the oldest weekly newspapers in the United Kingdom, publishing its first edition in 1772.

It is printed on Wednesday evening and is on sale or distributed on Thursday. It covers Shrewsbury and the surrounding area, including Church Stretton.

The editor of the Shrewsbury Chronicle is Caroline Jones, who took over from Leon Burakowski in 2020. The newspaper is published by the independently owned Midland News Association.

== History ==
Founded by Thomas Wood, a drapery salesman-turned-printer who had been a partner in the Birmingham Chronicle newspaper, the Shrewsbury Chronicle was first published on Monday 23 November 1772. It was then titled The Shrewsbury Chronicle, or Wood's British Commercial Pamphlet and eight pages long. Following Wood's death in 1801, his widow Mary (nee Horlick) carried on the paper until her own death in 1808, making her "one of the earliest, if not the earliest, of women newspaper proprietors".

In the 1830s the paper, under the editorship of John Watton, supported the Whigs.

The paper covered national, international and local news, with advertisements alone on its front page until February 1953 when major Shropshire-interest news stories began being carried on it.

The paper came out as a daily paper for just under a fortnight during the General Strike of 1926, its contents largely taken from BBC bulletins.

Over the centuries the paper has had many different offices and printing works around Shrewsbury, apart from a period between 1916 and 1927 when printing was done at Newport because of structural defects pending a rebuild, and later, several times, printing had to be done in Walsall when the works, then in Castle Foregate, was flooded. It is now based in Abbey Foregate.

In 2004 circulation was over 19,000, the highest for 20 years. In 2008 the paper's circulation was 14,015.

The paper was awarded Best Campaigning Newspaper in Great Britain 2005 by the Newspaper Society. In 2009, its campaigning on local issues was noted by the Shrewsbury MP, Daniel Kawczynski, as was its fundraising.

In 2009 the paper moved to a part-free, part-paid model, with some copies free and others for sale.

== Notable journalists and contributors ==
Essayist William Hazlitt's first published work, when a 13-year-old student, was a letter to the Chronicle, printed in July 1791, condemning the riots in Birmingham.

Henry Lucy, later known as a political journalist under pen-name "Toby, M.P.", was chief reporter at the Chronicle in 1864.

Shropshire author Mary Webb's first published work was a five-verse poem carried by the paper, written on hearing news of the Shrewsbury rail accident in 1907. Her brother gave it to the Chronicle without telling Webb, and the paper printed it anonymously.

Fyfe Robertson, the Scots broadcaster, was briefly a trainee reporter with the Chronicle in 1921.

== See also ==
- Shropshire Star
- Midland News Association
