= 107.7 The Wolf =

British radio station serving Wolverhampton

107.7 FM The Wolf

Wolverhampton; England
- Frequency: 107.7 MHz

Programming
- Format: Hot AC

Ownership
- Owner: UTV Radio

History
- First air date: 7 October 1997
- Last air date: 26 March 2012

Technical information
- Transmitter coordinates: 52.5852°N 2.1281°W

Links
- Website: www.thewolf.co.uk Archived site

107.7 The Wolf was a British Independent Local Radio station serving Wolverhampton and the surrounding areas, owned and operated by Forever Broadcasting, The Wireless Group and latterly, UTV.

== Rebrand ==
On 7 February 2012, UTV Radio announced the station would be rebranded as Signal 107, following the company's buyout of former MNA stations The Wyre and The Severn, which 107.7 The Wolf both merged with. The rebrand took place at midday on Monday 26 March 2012.
