= Express & Star =

Daily newspaper based in Wolverhampton, England

- Type: Daily regional newspaper
- Owner(s): Midland News Association, Iconic Media Group
- Editor: Mark Drew
- Founded: 1874
- Headquarters: St George's House, Lever Street, Wolverhampton WV2 1EZ
- Circulation: 11,864 (as of 2023)
- Sister newspapers: Shropshire Star
- ISSN: 0959-8588
- Website: expressandstar.com

The Express & Star is a regional daily newspaper and website in Britain. Founded in 1874, it is based in Wolverhampton, England, and covers the West Midlands county and Staffordshire.

The newspaper features a mixture of regional and national news and has a strong following for its sports coverage of association football, particularly local teams Wolverhampton Wanderers, Walsall, and West Bromwich Albion. It was one of the few independent newspapers still operating in the UK, having been under the continuous ownership of the Graham family almost since its inception. It is owned by the Midland News Association (MNA), which also owns the Shropshire Star newspaper. MNA and MNA Digital were sold to the news publishing group National World in 2023 and co-incided with the sale of the offices in Queen Street to developers. National World is now known as Iconic Media Group owned by the Denmark family.

== History ==
The origins of the Express & Star lie in the Evening Star – a liberal newspaper founded in Wolverhampton in 1880 as a rival to the existing conservative Evening Express, itself founded in 1874. In 1882 the Star was bought by wealthy Scottish-American philanthropist Andrew Carnegie, encouraged by his friend and fellow Dunfermline-born liberal (and by then prominent Wolverhampton councillor) Thomas Graham.

The combination of Carnegie's finance and Graham's organisational ability saw the paper flourish and within two years the Star had taken over the Express under the editorship of another Dunfermline native, editor Andrew Meikle. The combined newspaper adopted its current name in 1889.

Carnegie severed his links with the paper and its parent company the Midland News Association in 1902, leaving Graham in full control until his death in 1909. The following decades saw a steady expansion under Graham's descendants, with the paper's influence spreading out from its native Wolverhampton to cover the entire Black Country. An office in Birmingham was opened and later closed.

The 21st century saw a drop in circulation and advertising revenues, in common with most other newspapers, leading to the company shedding around 50 jobs through a voluntary redundancy scheme in April 2006, with further cuts announced in January 2007. Printing plants in West Bromwich, Wolverhampton and Ketley, Telford were closed in 2009, 2011 and 2021. The Express & Star is printed by Newsquest at their Deeside office.

In April 2011 the Express & Star introduced paid-for access to selected online content – including photo galleries, football match analysis and traffic and travel – under the banner of Express & Star 24. A print, online and smartphone package was offered for £2.34 a week, which included delivery of the newspaper. However, the paywall was scrapped after just nine months. The digital edition of the Express & Star was re-launched in 2021 and allows readers to access news, sport and analysis on their mobile or tablet.

In September 2023, the paper was sold by the family-owned Claverley Group to National World.

== Online media ==
The Express & Star publishes breaking news and sport content online each day, in addition to regular blogs and unique video content. Its website expressandstar.com was launched in 1997.

August 2012 saw the website re-launched in a responsive web design alongside its sister title shropshirestar.com – believed to be the first of any other regional newspaper websites in the UK.

An Express & Star App for iPad and iPhone was launched in January 2012, using page-turning technology to mimic the look and feel of the actual newspaper. Further apps for Android and Kindle Fire were released in February 2013.

The website also offers free access to the weekly Chronicle series.

== Leveson Inquiry ==
On 20 March 2012 Express & Star former editor Adrian Faber appeared as a witness at the Leveson Inquiry into Press standards. He told the inquiry that regional newspapers are different from national titles, relying far more on trust. Faber said the Express & Star had never hacked a mobile phone, never paid a public official for a story and saw trust as integral to its role.

== Awards ==
The Express & Star was awarded Midland Newspaper of the Year in 2012 by the Midlands Media Awards.

The Express & Star was awarded Daily/Sunday newspaper of the year (above 25,000) at the Regional Press Awards for 2013.

== Editors ==
- Mark Drew (2023-present)
- Martin Wright (2018–2023)
- Keith Harrison (2013–2018)
- Adrian Faber (2002–2013)
- Warren Wilson (1995–2002)
- Keith Parker (1977–1995)
- Mark Kersen (1972-1977)
- Ted Ireland (1971-1972)
- Clement Jones (1960–1970)
- Andrew Meikle (1885–1922)

== Notable former contributors ==
- Boris Johnson did work experience at the Express & Star when he was a trainee journalist on The Times in the 1980s.
- Broadcaster Sybil Ruscoe began her reporting career at the Express & Star.
- Jeremy Clarkson wrote for the Express & Star as well as its sister paper the Shropshire Star, which he says launched his career as a motoring columnist.

== Editions ==
- Staffordshire
- Stafford and Stone
- Walsall
- Sandwell
- Dudley and Wyre Forest
- City (Wolverhampton)
- A weekly Express & Star edition in Kidderminster was launched in October 2012 to replace the Kidderminster Chronicle.

== See also ==
- Shropshire Star
- Midland News Association
