= The Severn (radio station) =

Coordinates: 52.69997°N 2.519917°W

Shrewsbury/Oswestry; England
- Broadcast area: Shrewsbury, Oswestry and Telford & Wrekin
- Frequencies: 106.5, 107.1 & 107.4 MHz

Programming
- Format: Adult Contemporary

History
- First air date: 18 September 2006
- Last air date: 26 March 2012

The Severn was an Independent Local Radio station serving north & central Shropshire and the Telford & Wrekin area. The station was owned by MNA Broadcasting but was sold to UTV Media and merged on Monday 26 March 2012 with The Wyre and 107.7 The Wolf to form Signal 107, a station serving the Wolverhampton, Shropshire and north Worcestershire area.

== History ==
The Shrewsbury and Oswestry radio stations launched at 7am on Monday 18 September 2006 with the first song played being "Seven Days" by Sting. The first voices on air were Will Tudor, (former Beacon FM Shropshire breakfast presenter) on 106.5 The Severn (Shrewsbury) and Ben Day on 107.1 The Severn (Oswestry). The program director for the station as well as the MNA Broadcasting group was Pete Wagstaff, (former Beacon Radio program director). The station as a result when launched featured many Beacon Radio names including Stuart Hickman and Alan Nicklin.

Their sister station 107.4 Telford FM had however been on air since May 1999 but rebranded as 107.4 The Severn on 20 September 2010 to allow for county-wide coverage and shared programming. Shrewsbury's radio frequency was 106.5 MHz, Oswestry's & North Shropshire's frequency was 107.1 MHz and Telford & Wrekin's frequency was 107.4 MHz.

On 3 February 2012, The Severn, and sister station The Wyre, were acquired from the Midlands News Association by UTV Media. Live programming ended on the same day on both stations. The station was rebranded as Signal 107 at midday on Monday 26 March 2012 and merged with The Wyre & 107.7 The Wolf.

== See also ==
- Signal 107
- The Wyre
- 107.7 The Wolf
- UTV Radio
