= MNA Media =

Newspaper publishing company

Midland News Association
- Company type: Privately held
- Industry: Media
- Founded: 1889
- Founder: Andrew Carnegie; Thomas Graham
- Headquarters: Wolverhampton, England
- Area served: West Midlands, Staffordshire, Shropshire, Mid Wales
- Key people: Matt Ross (MD); Martin Wright (Editor-in-Chief); Phil Inman (CEO)
- Products: Newspapers, Magazines, Websites, Apps
- Services: Star Employment Services
- Owners: National World

The Midland News Association (MNA Media) is an England-based newspaper publishing company. Established in 1874, the Midland News Association is still one of Britain's largest independent media agencies. It publishes one of the UK's biggest-selling regional daily newspapers, the Express & Star, and its sister title, the Shropshire Star, as well as eight weekly titles and the monthly The Farmer newspaper and Shropshire Magazine.

The MNA has one of the fastest-growing web networks in the regional press, with 3.28 million average monthly unique users to expressandstar.com and shropshirestar.com – growing significantly yearly. iPad and iPhone apps for Express & Star and Shropshire Star were launched in January 2012.

Midland News Association is part of the Claverley Group, and the company's head office is in Queen Street, Wolverhampton.

== Publishing ==
Daily Newspapers
- Express & Star
- Shropshire Star
Weekly Newspapers
- Bridgnorth Journal
- Cannock Chronicle Week
- Newport and Market Drayton Advertiser
- Sandwell, Walsall and Halesowen Chronicle Week
- South Shropshire and Mid Wales Journal
- Telford Journal
- Shrewsbury Chronicle
- Wolverhampton, Dudley and Stourbridge Chronicle Week

Magazines

- Shropshire Magazine

Monthly Newspapers

- The Farmer

Online editions of the weekly newspapers are delivered free to subscribers of the online page-turning edition of the Shropshire Star or Express & Star. The company's weekly papers are delivered across the West Midlands.

== History ==
The history of the MNA can be traced back almost 150 years to a partnership between two men, including an ancestor of the Graham family who still owns the newspapers today.

Scottish-American millionaire Andrew Carnegie founded the Express & Star in Wolverhampton in the 1880s along with a group of radical Liberal Party members, including Thomas Graham.

Carnegie aimed to campaign, through a string of regional daily newspapers, for the creation of a British Republic. His dream was to sack the monarchy, scrap the House of Lords, and destroy every vestige of privilege in the land.

By 1902, Carnegie had abandoned his mission, and the newspaper has been owned by the Graham family ever since.

=== Early growth ===
At least 28 newspapers have been published in Wolverhampton over the past century, but Express & Star remains the market leader.

Among those to be seen off was the Evening News, which closed in July 1915. During the First World War, the Express & Star raised its price to a penny due to the price of paper, with a promise to revert to a halfpenny when hostilities ended. By 1918, it had a staff of 100, including one delivery van and one driver.

The Graham family took a wider view of the newspaper industry, with Malcolm Graham – the current owner's late father – spending part of his twenties on newspapers in Canada, where he learned from the slick "New World" style of journalism.

On his return, he applied to the Express & Star, the more modern approach he had seen firsthand.

By the 1930s, the circulation was more than 100,000, and the paper was part of a newspaper war that saw readers offered all manners of inducement to boost sales, such as tea sets and holiday tokens.

During the Second World War, newsprint restrictions meant the size of the paper was reduced by half. In response to the shortage, the design moved from broadsheet to tabloid. A comforts fund organized by the paper raised £160,000 throughout the war, while the paper also became the first to sponsor a Spitfire collection fund.

=== 1950s to 1970s ===
The post-war period saw the company compete with innovations such as television yet still push sales by an average of 1,120 yearly.

Despite a national print dispute in 1959, the circulation rose to 201,594 copies daily.

Until 1963, the MNA published the Express & Star, Wolverhampton Chronicle, plus the Saturday football paper, all set in a conventional hot metal composing room and printed on five letterpress machines.

In 1964, plans were made to hive off 19,000 copies of the Salop edition to create the Shropshire Star, published at a new photo-composed offset printing plant in Ketley.

The board saw an opportunity with the growth of Dawley New Town – later renamed Telford – and produced a successful news and advertising product to serve a county that is a mixture of agriculture and industrial areas.

Serving the largest inland county in the UK, both Shropshire Star and Shropshire Weekly Series cover all the major population centres within the circulation area.

Innovation continued during the 1970s, with the MNA introducing the first VDU system and adopting computerized accounting and facsimile transmission.

=== 1980s to present day ===
The Express & Star and the Shropshire Star are among the biggest-selling regional newspapers in the UK.

In December 2012, Midland News Association also launched its recruitment agency, Star Employment Services, which operates from the MNA's headquarters in Queen Street, Wolverhampton.

In September 2023, it was announced that the Claverley Group had sold Midland News Association to National World PLC. The £11m sale included Press Computer Systems, which supplies publishing platforms for MNA and other major publishers, including Newsquest and DC Thomson. The sale marked Claverley Group's exit from regional newspaper publishing.

== See also ==
- Shrewsbury Chronicle
- North Shropshire Chronicle
