= 2012 in British radio =

This is a list of events in British radio during 2012.

== Events ==
=== January ===
- 6 January – Following its sale to UKRD, Fresh Radio, which broadcast on MW across the Yorkshire Dales, closes. The more populous parts of the area are later served by Stray FM which is expanded to cover areas such as Skipton and Wharfedale, and the Richmond area is served to Star Radio North East.
- 7 January –
  - Alan Titchmarsh joins Classic FM to present a new Saturday morning programme.
  - After having his car stolen the previous evening, Graham Norton asks listeners of his Radio 2 show to help find it. Calling it "The Great Car Hunt" he tells listeners to "Keep your eyes out for it. It was filthy by the way." The car is subsequently returned to him.
- 8 January – Graham Torrington joins Smooth Radio to host his Late Night Love show on the network.
- 12 January – GMG Radio confirms a deal with US syndication firm Premiere Networks to air 1970s editions of the original American Top 40 show presented by Casey Kasem at weekends on its new digital station "Smooth 70s". The station also features Disco Lunch and Late Night Love Songs among its weekday programming.
- 21 January – Under new guidelines to come into force from 30 April clinics which charge for pregnancy services including abortions will be able to advertise on radio and television after the Broadcast Committee of Advertising Practice ruled there was no justification for barring such clinics from advertising their services.
- 23 January – GMG Radio announces it is conducting a "full review" of its news staff. Currently the broadcaster employs 39 journalists, nine of whom are based in Scotland.
- 26 January – The UK-based British Army radio station, Garrison FM switches on two more transmitters in Inverness, making the city the second in Scotland to receive the service after Edinburgh.
- 28 January – Zoë Ball announces she is stepping down from her Saturday breakfast show on Radio 2 and that she has presented her final programme. She will continue to provide cover for other presenters on the network.
- 29 January – Radio 4's Desert Island Discs celebrates its 70th anniversary, having first been broadcast on 29 January 1942.

=== February ===
- 3 February –
  - UTV Media acquires the licences for The Wyre and The Severn from MNA Broadcasting.
  - Manx Radio, the Isle of Man's national radio station sets out proposals to cut all but one of its staff presenters as the broadcaster faces cuts in contributions in the forthcoming Government budget for 2012–13.
- 7 February – UTV Media unveils plans to merge The Wolf, The Wyre and The Sever and rebrand them as Signal 107. The rebrand happens on 26 March.
- 14 February – Poole community radio station The Bay 102.8 is re-branded as Hot Radio.
- 16 February – Ofcom gives the KMFM n e t w o r k permission to network the breakfast show, meaning programming will be identical across all seven stations at all times.
- 19 February – Jazz FM issues an apology after listeners heard five minutes of what appeared to be an adult film played over the beginning of one of its programmes the previous evening. Ofcom later launches an investigation into the incident after receiving three complaints.
- 21 February – Global Radio places an immediate ban on the playing of tracks by the boy band One Direction on its stations after group member Harry Styles mistakenly thanked Radio 1 during a BRIT Awards acceptance speech for an award voted for by listeners of Capital Radio, a Global station.
- 25 February – Television presenter Anneka Rice makes her debut on Radio 2, presenting the Saturday breakfast show vacated by Zoë Ball.
- 26 February – The Top Ten countdown from The Radio 1 Chart Show is made available in vision for the first time through the station's website.
- 28 February – LBC introduces the first client-hosted programme with the weekday "Bupa Wellbeing Hour".
- 29 February – The BBC World Service celebrates its 80th anniversary.

=== March ===
- 1 March – Some digital radio listeners are required to retune their devices to continue receiving some stations after changes are made settings to "improve the efficiency of the network".
- 5 March – Phil Upton says he will step down as host of the breakfast show on BBC Radio WM from the end of next month after five years in the role.
- 6 March – Comedian Alan Carr announces his intention to quit his Radio 2 show Going Out with Alan Carr so he can devote more time to his television career.
- 7 March – Guildford based County Sound is given approval by Ofcom to change its classic hits format to a community-based information station under the name Eagle Extra.
- 14 March –
  - The owners of Jack FM announce the launch of a new consultancy firm, OXIS Media, which will represent the brand throughout the UK and Europe.
  - Ofcom invites bids from groups to apply for a community radio licence to broadcast in Northern Ireland.
- 16 March – Quidem, owners of the Touch FM brand agrees a deal with the Lincs FM Group to buy Oak FM in Loughborough and Hinckley, thus increasing its number of stations to eight.
- 19 March – BBC Director-General Mark Thompson tells staff at the broadcaster that he will step down from his position later in the year.
- 20 March – It is reported that Norman Cook (aka Fatboy Slim) will join Xfm for a ten part series titled On The Road To Big Beach Bootique 5 airing on Saturday nights from the end of March.
- 21 March – Smooth Radio announces a deal to begin airing a syndicated show from the United States presented by Donny Osmond from 8 April, replacing Graham Torrington's Late Night Love. Torrington will leave the network, while other changes include Drivetime's Carlos and afternoon presenter David Jensen swapping shows.
- 23 March –
  - The BBC's MediaCityUK complex at Salford Quays is officially opened by the Queen.
  - Tony Blackburn and Mike Read are signed to appear on the Magic Network.
- 26 March –
  - Radio 2 confirms it will air a dance music show presented by Dave Pearce from April. Dave Pearce's Dance Years will air on Saturday evenings.
  - Orion Media rebrands the West Midlands stations BRMB, Beacon, Mercia and Wyvern as Free Radio.
- 27 March – The BBC announces plans to axe 140 news posts in 2013 as part of cost-cutting measures.

=== April ===
- 2 April –
  - A shake-up of the Radio 1 schedule sees Scott Mills and Greg James swapping shows, James hosting the drivetime show and Mills the afternoon show.
  - Former Heart Bristol breakfast presenter Andy Bush joins Absolute Radio to present the afternoon show.
  - Talksport dedicates its entire programming schedule to sport output, having previously offered a variety of sport and general news-related topics.
- 3 April – 2012 London mayoral election candidates Boris Johnson and Ken Livingstone reportedly have a heated argument following a debate on London's LBC.
- 8 April – Forces broadcaster BFBS simulcasts a two-hour show with Smooth Radio allowing family and friends of serving troops to connect with their loved ones.
- 10 April – Martin White is sacked from his role as sidekick on The Dave Gorman Show on Absolute Radio.
- 14 April – Radio 2 airs a minute-by-minute account of the sinking of the RMS Titanic to coincide with the 100th anniversary of the disaster.
- 16 April – Graham Torrington joins BBC Radio WM to present a late night weekday music and chat programme. He also rejoins BBC Bristol from 21 April to host Graham Torrington's Late Night Love Songs, a show syndicated across BBC stations in the South West on Saturday and Sunday evenings.
- 17 April – Ed James celebrates ten years as breakfast show presenter at Heart West Midlands.
- 19 April –
  - BBC Radio 4's Today features a groundbreaking interview with Tourette's sufferer Jess Thomas.
  - Ed James is named as Chairman of Birmingham Press Club.
- 20 April – Premier Christian Radio loses a High Court challenge against a ban on an advert it planned to run seeking Christians who felt they had been "marginalised at work". The Court rules that it was "directed to a political end" and the Radio Advertising Clearance Centre acted lawfully in banning the commercial.
- 23 April –
  - Jazz FM is found to be in breach of Ofcom's broadcasting code after the transmission of a pornographic soundtrack during an edition of one of its programmes. However, the station is not fined over the incident.
  - The Independent reports that BBC Radio 5 Live is to make broadcasting history by producing a two-hour show live from an abortion clinic. Presented by Victoria Derbyshire, the show will air next month and the BBC hopes it will provide some insight into what is regarded by many as a taboo subject.
- Undated in April
  - Gilles Peterson joins BBC 6 Music as the station shakes up its weekend schedule.
  - Celador Radio rebrands Andover Sound and Newbury Sound as The Breeze, bringing to nine the number of stations with that name.
  - The weekend breakfast show on the north of England Magic stops being a local show in favour of a networked programme. Only the weekday breakfast show remains locally produced.

=== May ===
- 1 May – Ofcom approves a co-location request from Touch Radio Staffordshire to move from Tamworth to Oak FM's headquarters in Coalville. Touch will share some of Oak's programming, but must retain its local Staffordshire-based breakfast show.
- 5 May – BBC Breakfast presenter Sian Williams joins Radio 4's Saturday Live magazine programme to co-host alongside Rev. Richard Coles. The programme is also extended from 60 to 90 minutes.
- 7 May – Launch of Heart Cornwall replacing Atlantic FM.
- 12 May – Liza Tarbuck begins presenting her first regular show on BBC Radio 2, having provided holiday cover on many previous occasions.
- 14 May – "Jealous of the Angels", a song recorded by US country singer Jenn Bostic and inspired by her father, is first played by broadcaster Simon Bates on his Simon Bates at Breakfast show on Smooth Radio as part of the Our Tune strand. The song is quickly among the station's Top 10 Most Played for the week, and goes on to receive over two million views on YouTube.
- 15 May – Newcastle-based Amazing Radio leaves the DAB multiplex after a contractual dispute with Digital One owners Arqiva, but continues to broadcast online.
- 22 May – Capital FM ends its three-month boycott on One Direction songs after the group's hit What Makes You Beautiful is played on the network shortly after 7.45pm.
- 24 May – Orion Media announces it will relaunch four medium wave frequencies in the West Midlands under the Free Radio brand. The stations – currently part of the Gold network – will be dedicated to 80s music when the rebrand happens later in the year.
- 27 May – Smooth Radio's Simon Bates presents a special programme ahead of the Thames Diamond Jubilee Pageant, previewing Elizabeth II's journey along the Thames on the Spirit of Chartwell. Given special access to the vessel chosen as the royal barge he chats to the boat's owner, Philip Morrell as well as composer Debbie Wiseman who was commissioned to write the music for the event.
- 31 May – BBC Radio 4 announces a five-and-a-half-hour celebration of James Joyce's Ulysses on this coming Bloomsday (16 June), claiming it as the novel's first full-length dramatisation in Britain.
- Undated in May – BBC Somerset launches as a full-time station.

=== June ===
- 1 June – Swansea's 102.1 Bay Radio is relaunched as Nation 80s, becoming the first FM station in the UK to play nothing but 80s music.
- 2 June – Jonathan Dimbleby presents his final edition of Radio 4's Any Answers? after 25 years, but continues with its sister programme Any Questions?.
- 3 June – As part of their Diamond Jubilee coverage Global Radio's LBC 97.3 makes a world exclusive broadcast from The Shard, Europe's tallest building, to cover the River Thames Pageant, offering a bird's eye view of the event.
- 4 June – Radio 2 airs the Diamond Jubilee Concert from Buckingham Palace.
- 7 June – Online music station Last.fm says that some of its passwords have been leaked, and urges users of its website to change them immediately.
- 8 June –
  - Bauer Radio stations Kiss and Heat carry the first in a series of live adverts for a new TV show on Channel 4. The heat4...Live! social TV experiences are three live dual screen events, with the first centred around the Hollyoaks Savage Party special.
  - It is reported that Absolute Radio's CEO Donnach O'Driscoll has emailed users of the station's website to apologise after some received unsolicited mail.
- 9 June – Anita Anand takes over as presenter of Any Answers?.
- 11 June – Simon Bates takes his Smooth Radio Breakfast Show to the Falkland Islands for a week of programmes to mark the 30th anniversary of the Falklands War.
- 12 June – It is reported that GMG has received multiple offers for its radio business which value it at £50 million, as the company seeks to reshape itself to stem losses being made by The Guardian and The Observer.
- 15 June – Supermarket retailer Tesco buys a majority share in WE7, the digital music platform which offers free personalised radio stations online.
- 17 June – Salisbury's Spire FM simulcasts a two-hour programme with BFBS for Father's Day.
- 20 June – The BBC Trust says that Radio 1's core audience is still too old, despite changes made to output following an amendment to the wording of its service licence in 2009. The station is aimed at the 15–29-year age group, but the average age of their listeners is 30.
- 23 – 24 June – 100,000 people attend Radio 1's Hackney Weekend, a two-day music concert at Hackney Marshes, which forms part of the build-up to the 2012 Summer Olympics.
- 25 June – GMG Radio is sold to Global Radio for an undisclosed amount, thought to be around £50m. However, no structural changes will be made to either organisations until the deal has been investigated by Ofcom. Several rival radio groups express their concerns over the takeover and the effect it could have on commercial radio in the UK.
- 26 June – The online Radioplayer service is to be made available to non-Ofcom licensed stations for the first time, but initially only 30 slots are being offered.
- 29 June – Tim Lihoreau replaces Mark Forrest as host of Classic FM's weekday breakfast show with Jane Jones taking over the weekend breakfast show which Tim vacated and John Brunning replaces Mark as printer of weekly Classic FM chart show.

=== July ===
- 3 July –
  - The BBC Trust rules that Sir Terry Wogan breached the broadcasting guidelines following comments he made on his Radio 2 show that appeared to make light of the Costa Concordia disaster nine days after the ship ran aground and partially sank off the Italian Coast in January.
  - Global Radio announce plans to branch into television with the launch of two non-stop music channels; Heart TV and Capital TV, which will go on air from September.
- 4 July – Broadcaster George Entwistle is named as the next Director-General of the BBC beginning in autumn 2012.
- 8 July – It is reported that Wise Buddah Productions will create a new jingle package for BBC Radio 2.
- 11 July – Chris Moyles announces on-air that he will leave the Radio 1 Breakfast Show in September. It is confirmed later the same day that he will be succeeded by Nick Grimshaw.
- 12 July – At midday, the BBC World Service makes its final broadcast from London's Bush House after 71 years at the building. The broadcaster's language services are thereafter relocated to Broadcasting House in a merger with the rest of BBC News.
- 18 July – BBC Commissioning invites tenders to produce a new networked evening show for its local radio stations to begin airing from 7 January 2013.
- 26 July – Talksport secures a six-year deal to air FA Cup matches, meaning the BBC has lost the exclusive rights to the competition and must now share with its commercial rival.
- 27 July-12 August – BBC Radio 5 Live operates a temporary station – 5 Live Olympics Extra – to provide additional coverage of the 2012 Summer Olympics.

=== August ===
- 3 August – Culture Secretary Jeremy Hunt instructs Ofcom and the Office of Fair Trading to examine Global Radio's £70m purchase of GME Radio.
- 6 August – Ruth Barnes takes over as breakfast show presenter on Amazing Radio.
- 13 August – To celebrate Team GB's Olympic success at London 2012 Absolute Radio's breakfast show host Christian O'Connell plays Spandau Ballet's 1983 hit Gold 29 times between 6.00am and 10.30am, matching the number of gold medals won by Britain's athletes.
- 14 August – Outgoing BBC Director-General Mark Thompson is appointed CEO of The New York Times, taking up his role in November.
- 17 August – 24 September – BBC Local Radio begins switching off its medium wave frequencies in a five-week experiment to determine whether the service will be missed by their listeners. BBC Radio Kent, BBC Radio Lincolnshire, BBC Radio Merseyside and BBC Radio Nottingham are the first to cease AM broadcasting in what is planned as a cost-cutting exercise.
- 18 August – It is announced that veteran Birmingham-based sports broadcaster Tony Butler has retired due to ill health.
- 24 August – An Ofcom survey of radio listeners reveals many believe there are too many adverts on commercial radio.
- 27 August –
  - Astrologer Russell Grant joins Smooth Radio to present a one-off programme playing some of his favourite tracks from the 1960s.
  - The digital station Smooth 70s counts down its Top 70 of the 70s chart after inviting listeners to vote for their favourite hit from the decade. The chart, presented by several presenters from the main Smooth Radio station, features ABBA's Dancing Queen as its number one.
- 28 August – UTV Media – which owns the ITV franchise for Northern Ireland and the UK-based sports-orientated radio station Talksport – reports a summer of mixed fortunes in terms of advertising revenue. Coverage of the 2012 European Cup proved lucrative for talkSPORT, but television advertising was hit by the 2012 Summer Olympics.
- 30 August –
  - BBC Radio 2 unveils a landmark 50-part series which will highlight 50 tracks that have shaped modern British culture. The series, The People's Songs will be presented by Stuart Maconie and air in 2013, and features songs as diverse as Vera Lynn's "We'll Meet Again" and "Rehab" by Amy Winehouse.
  - In a marketing strategy designed to target its listeners with adverts suited to their age and location Absolute Radio announces plans to require its listeners to register with their website to hear their online streaming services.
  - West Midlands based Sanjhi Awaz Radio ceases broadcasting after two years on air due to financial problems.

=== September ===
- 3 September – Wayne Bavin leaves 96.2 The Revolution owned by Steve Penk and takes over Drive time on Sunderland's 103.4 Sun FM.
- 4 September –
  - Maria Miller is appointed as Secretary of State for Culture, Media and Sport, replacing Jeremy Hunt.
  - Gold is replaced by Free Radio 80s in the West Midlands on AM and DAB.
- 5 September –
  - It is announced that BBC Radio 4 announcers Charlotte Green and Harriet Cass will take voluntary redundancy as the BBC cuts the announcing team for the station from twelve to ten. At Radio 2 Fran Godfrey and Fenella Fudge will also leave, along with several freelance newsreaders who present bulletins for the network as the BBC streamlines its radio news teams.
  - Mark Goodier announces he will leave Smooth Radio in mid-December to focus on his company, Wise Buddah Productions.
- 7 September – BBC Radio 2 commissions an hour-long music drama pilot titled Shout to the Top starring Shane Richie, that will combine specially written music and drama from the Radio Drama team.
- 12 September – The radio industry news website Radio Today reports that Simon Bates has started to present a separate breakfast show for Smooth Radio's sister station, Smooth 70s. The content is "voice tracked" from the main breakfast show.
- 14 September –
  - Chris Moyles hosts his final breakfast show on Radio 1.
  - Sir Charles Allen, chairman of Global Radio criticises media regulation rules, saying those relating to the purchase of radio stations are out of date.
- 17 September –
  - George Entwistle takes up his role of Director-General of the BBC.
  - The syndicated BBC Local Radio evening show contract is awarded to Wire Free Productions, a new company set up by former BBC executives Matthew Bannister and Husain Husaini.
- 24 September – Nick Grimshaw takes over the Radio 1 Breakfast Show.
- 27 September – Magic 1152 breakfast show presenter Anna Foster presents her programme from her phone due to being stuck in traffic in Newcastle upon Tyne.

=== October ===
- 2 October – The switch-off of medium wave frequencies at some BBC local radio stations will continue after the trial attracted very few complaints from listeners, the BBC confirms.
- 4 October – Former Classic FM presenter Mark Forrest is confirmed as the presenter of the BBC's networked Local Radio Evening programme, which will begin from 7 January 2013.
- 5 October –
  - Absolute Radio 00s rebrands itself Absolute Radio 007 for the day to celebrate the 50th anniversary of the James Bond film series and the launch of Sky Movies 007, a film channel dedicated to Bond movies.
  - To celebrate the 50th anniversary of the release of the first single from The Beatles, all 39 BBC local radio stations stage their own My Beatles Story Day, airing listeners memories of the group.
- 8 October – The BBC launches iPlayer Radio as a separate service to BBC iPlayer. The service will provide a dedicated online platform for BBC radio content.
- 11 October – The Office of Fair Trading agrees to fast-track the investigation into Global Radio's purchase of GMG Radio after Secretary of State for Culture, Media and Sport Maria Miller says the deal will not be investigated for media plurality. The matter is also forwarded onto the Competition Commission, which oversees business mergers and takeovers. The Competition Commission later announces 27 March 2013 as the date on which it will publish its findings into the takeover.
- 12 October –
  - Launch of Heart and Capital TV on Freesat and Sky.
  - The BBC announces that sports presenter Clare Balding will replace Aled Jones as host of Radio 2's faith-based programme Good Morning Sunday from January 2013.
- 17 October – BBC Radio 2 axes folk presenter Mike Harding after fifteen years with the network. He will host his last show on 26 December.
- 23 October – Ofcom warns west London community station OnFM that it is in "serious and ongoing" breach of its licensing conditions after being off air since 7 September.
- 30 October – Smooth Radio confirms that Smooth Christmas will return, airing on the Digital One multiplex in the lead up to the festive season, giving the brand three stations on the platform.

=== November ===
- 1 November –
  - The BBC makes 920 episodes of Alistair Cooke's Letter From America available for download through its website. The editions represent the entire back catalogue of the series held by the corporation.
  - BBC London 94.9 presenter Danny Baker quits his show live on air, and launches a two-hour tirade against station chiefs after learning his regular daily show is to be axed.
- 5 November –
  - An advertising campaign for digital radio featuring a "digital evangelist" named "D Love" is unveiled at a conference at the BBC's Broadcasting House. Ads for the two-year campaign will air on BBC radio and television, as well as on commercial stations.
  - Real Radio begins networking its daytime schedule.
- 10 November – George Entwistle steps down as BBC Director-General following the Newsnight child abuse broadcast controversy.
- 11 November – Tim Davie, BBC head of audio and music becomes Acting Director-General following George Entwistle's resignation.
- 13 November – A parliamentary reception is held to celebrate the 60th anniversary of the UK Singles Chart, which launched on 14 November 1952. Among guests at the event are Tony Blackburn and the latest presenter of the Radio 1 Chart Show, Jameela Jamil.
- 14 November – To celebrate the 90th anniversary of its first radio broadcast, the BBC links all stations owned by the corporation around the UK and the world for a three-minute show titled Radio Reunited.
- 16 November – Magic Network presenter Dave Lee Travis is taken off air with immediate effect after he was arrested as part of an investigation into sexual offences.
- 19 November – BBC Radio 2 raises £4,010,974 for BBC Children in Need, its largest total to date.
- 22 November –
  - The BBC appoints Tony Hall as its new Director-General. He is expected to start in the role in early March 2013.
  - Absolute Radio launches an app for Xbox Live.
- 28 November – Radioplayer cancels its offer to provide places to non-Ofcom licensed stations due to lack of innovation.
- 30 November – Harriet Scott steps down as co-host of the breakfast show on Heart London after seven years.

=== December ===
- 4 December – Australian radio presenters Mel Greig and Mike Christian, impersonating the Queen and Prince of Wales, make a prank call to King Edward VII's Hospital in London which is providing prenatal care to Catherine, Duchess of Cambridge. The following day, their conversations with two nurses are broadcast without consent on their Hot30 Countdown show on 2Day FM in Sydney. On 7 December follows the suicide of Jacintha Saldanha, one of the nurses involved. On 10 December Scottish radio presenter Robin Galloway, who has built a career on making prank calls, suspends sales of his latest CD following the incident.
- 14 December –
  - BBC Radio 1 broadcasts its last show from Yalding House in London, The Radio 1 Breakfast Show with Nick Grimshaw.
  - Real and Smooth have secured exclusive broadcast rights to the "Christmas Hit Factory Live" concert, a show featuring artists and groups who achieved success with the Stock Aitken and Waterman and PWL record labels. The event is held on 21 December and is aired on New Year's Eve.
- 15 December –
  - Celador rebrands its recently acquired Kestrel FM stations as The Breeze.
  - Free Radio presents £750,000 to West Midlands charities at its annual music event, Live 2012.
- 17 December –
  - Lynn Parsons takes over Smooth Radio's weekday Mid Morning show from Mark Goodier. David Prever succeeds her as presenter of the weekend Mid Morning slot.
  - Alternation broadcasts for the final time on NE1fm after 5 and a half years. It was a part of the station's line up at launch.
- 18 December – Bennett, Coleman & Co, the owners of Absolute Radio are reported to be in discussions to sell the loss-making station for £10-£15million.
- 19 December – BBC Radio 5 Live Controller Advian Van Klaveren steps down from his role following the publication of the Pollard report. Jonathan Wall will replace him on a temporary basis.
- 21 December – Kerrang Radio counts down to the End of the World as predicted in a 5,000-year-old Mayan prophecy by inviting listeners to request the songs they'd most like to hear before they die. Christmas music is also banned on the network.
- 29 December – Classic FM managing director Darren Henley is awarded an OBE in the 2013 New Year Honours for services to music.

== Station debuts ==
- 17 February – Nifty UK
- 26 March – Free Radio
- 4 September – Free Radio 80s
- 5 November – Solid Gold Gem

== Programme debuts ==
- 10 January – Inside Health on BBC Radio 4 (2012 – present)
- 7 February – The Kitchen Cabinet on BBC Radio 4 (2012 – present)
- 30 March – The Listening Project on BBC Radio 4 in conjunction with Local BBC Radio (2012 – present)
- 6 April – BBC Radio 1's Dance Anthems on BBC Radio 1 (2012 – present)
- 16 April – Late Night Graham Torrington on BBC Radio WM and BBC Coventry & Warwickshire (later other BBC Local Radio in the Midlands) (2012–2020)
- 28 May – Honest Doubt on BBC Radio 4 (2012)
- 31 July – Kevin Eldon Will See You Now on BBC Radio 4 (2012–2019)
- 24 September – The Radio 1 Breakfast Show with Nick Grimshaw on BBC Radio 1 (2012–2018)
- 28 September – Gloomsbury on BBC Radio 4 (2012–2018)
- November – The Golden Age on BBC Radio 4 (2012)

== Relaunching this year after a break of one month or more ==
Date of return	Station	Date of original closedown
1 November 2012	Smooth Christmas	27 December 2011

== Continuing radio programmes ==
=== 1940s ===
- Sunday Half Hour (1940–2018)
- Desert Island Discs (1942 – present)
- Woman's Hour (1946 – present)
- A Book at Bedtime (1949 – present)

=== 1950s ===
- The Archers (1950 – present)
- The Today Programme (1957 – present)

=== 1960s ===
- Farming Today (1960 – present)
- In Touch (1961 – present)
- The World at One (1965 – present)
- The Official Chart (1967 – present)
- Just a Minute (1967 – present)
- The Living World (1968 – present)
- The Organist Entertains (1969–2018)

=== 1970s ===
- PM (1970 – present)
- Start the Week (1970 – present)
- You and Yours (1970 – present)
- I'm Sorry I Haven't a Clue (1972 – present)
- Good Morning Scotland (1973 – present)
- Newsbeat (1973 – present)
- File on 4 (1977 – present)
- Money Box (1977 – present)
- The News Quiz (1977 – present)
- Feedback (1979 – present)
- The Food Programme (1979 – present)
- Science in Action (1979 – present)

=== 1980s ===
- Steve Wright in the Afternoon (1981–1993, 1999–2022)
- In Business (1983 – present)
- Sounds of the 60s (1983 – present)
- Loose Ends (1986 – present)

=== 1990s ===
- The Moral Maze (1990 – present)
- Essential Selection (1991 – present)
- Essential Mix (1993 – present)
- Up All Night (1994 – present)
- Wake Up to Money (1994 – present)
- Private Passions (1995 – present)
- The David Jacobs Collection (1996–2013)
- Sunday Night at 10 (1998–2013)
- In Our Time (1998 – present)
- Material World (1998 – present)
- Scott Mills (1998–2022)
- The Now Show (1998 – present)

=== 2000s ===
- BBC Radio 2 Folk Awards (2000 – present)
- Big John @ Breakfast (2000 – present)
- Sounds of the 70s (2000–2008, 2009 – present)
- Kermode and Mayo's Film Review (2001–2022)
- A Kist o Wurds (2002 – present)
- Fighting Talk (2003 – present)
- Jeremy Vine (2003 – present)
- Annie Mac (2004–2021)
- Fearne Cotton (2009–2015)
- Elaine Paige on Sunday (2004 – present)
- The Bottom Line (2006 – present)
- The Christian O'Connell Breakfast Show (2006 – present)
- The Unbelievable Truth (2006 – present)
- Radcliffe & Maconie (2007 – present)
- Geoff Lloyd's Hometime Show (2008–2017)
- The Strand (2008–2013)
- The Media Show (2008 – present)
- Newsjack (2009 – present)
- Paul O'Grady on the Wireless (2009–2022)
- Alan and Mel's Summer Escape (2009–2020)

=== 2010s ===
- Weekend Wogan (2010–2015)
- The Chris Evans Breakfast Show (2010–2018)
- Graham Norton (2010–2020)
- Simon Mayo Drivetime (2010–2018)
- Ambridge Extra (2011–2013)
- Simon Bates at Breakfast (2011–2014)
- The Third Degree (2011 – present)

== Ending this year ==
- 22 March – Sounds of the 20th Century (2011–2012)
- 22 June – Honest Doubt (2012)
- 30 July – Brian Gulliver's Travels (2011–2012)
- 14 September – The Chris Moyles Show (2004–2012)

== Closing this year ==
Date	Station	Debut(s)
6 January	Fresh Radio	1997
5 March	Rossendale Radio	2010
26 March	Beacon Radio	1976
26 March	BRMB	1974
26 March	Mercia	1980
26 March	Wyvern FM	1982
25 June	KMFM Extra (replaced on DAB by the new-countywide KMFM)	
8 August	Dune FM	1997
30 August	Sanjhi Awaz Radio	2010
26 December	Smooth Christmas	2011 & 2012

== Deaths ==
- 6 January – Bob Holness, 83, broadcaster and quiz show host
- 22 January – Sarah Cullen, 62, broadcast journalist (Today)
- 9 June – Don Durbridge, 73, broadcaster
- 7 July – Alf Pearson, 102, singer (part of Bob and Alf Pearson double act)
- 6 August – Bernard Lovell, 98, physicist and radioastronomer
- 30 August – Daire Brehan, 55, Irish-born actress, broadcaster and barrister
- 10 September – John Moffatt, 89, character actor (died 2012)
- 12 September – Derek Jameson, 82, tabloid journalist and broadcaster
- 22 October – Russell Joslin, 50, journalist
- 23 November – Chris Jones, broadcaster
- 21 December – Daphne Oxenford, 93, radio presenter and actress, presenter of Listen with Mother
