= Heart Kent =

Radio station in Kent, England

Coordinates: 51°21′29″N 1°3′20″E

- Whitstable, England
- Broadcast area: Kent
- Frequencies: FM: Thanet District 95.9; Ashford 96.1; Dover 97.0; Whitstable 102.8; Maidstone, Gravesham & Medway 103.1; DAB: Kent: 11C
- Branding: This is Heart

Ownership
- Owner: Global

History
- First air date: 1 October 1984; 42 years ago
- Last air date: 3 June 2019; 7 years ago

Links
- Website: www.heartkent.co.uk

Heart Kent (previously Invicta FM) launched as an Independent Local Radio station owned and operated by Global Radio as part of the Heart network. It broadcast to the county of Kent, in England, from studios at John Wilson Business Park in Whitstable.

== History ==
=== Invicta in the 80s ===
Originally, independent local radio in Kent was to be provided by two franchisees: one covering Maidstone and Medway and the other covering East Kent. The companies that were awarded the licences to broadcast to these areas were Northdown Radio and Network East Kent respectively but merged on 26 March 1984. The company's new name was taken from a failed bid for the East Kent licence, owned by former Radio 2 presenter Desmond Carrington, Radio Invicta Ltd. The new countywide station went on air as Invicta Sound at 6am on 1 October 1984. The first few seconds of broadcasting were marred by a sound mix up, which meant that Magnus's discussions with his production team were broadcast to the county.

The station output was described as "Radio 2 cum Radio 4", featuring a mix of middle-of-the-road music coupled with a prominent news schedule where a news bulletin would last at least nine minutes.

The managing director of the company, Cecilia Garnett, was sacked after the first few months.

The station was relaunched as Invicta Radio in spring 1985. The company's studios, originally purchased by Desmond Carrington's Radio Invicta Ltd, were based in an old warehouse, at 15 Station Road East in Canterbury, with a second, smaller base at 37 Earl Street in Maidstone. Originally, presenters generally had the option of choosing where to present their show from, depending on where they lived. In the Invicta Sound days, there was some separate programming for East and West Kent, including dedicated Drivetime shows for each half of the county. Some specialist shows could only be heard by one half of the county, including a classical music show and a programme aimed at children, called "Kids' Stuff".

In 1985, a general reorganisation of radio frequencies in Britain forced Invicta into changing a number of them:

- 103.8 MHz (West Kent) from Bluebell Hill became 103.1 MHz
- 95.1 MHz (East Kent) from Dunkirk became 102.8 MHz
- 96.3 MHz (Ashford) became 96.1 MHz
- 95.9 MHz (Thanet) and 97.0 MHz (Folkestone and Dover) remained unchanged.

The lack of a single high-powered frequency for the east of the county was because of international frequency clearance problems due to the proximity to France, across the English Channel. Instead, three low-powered transmitters were installed in Ashford, Folkestone/Dover and Thanet. This problem did not affect BBC national and local radio, which use a single high-powered site at Swingate, near Dover.

Medium-wave transmitters were located at Littlebourne (603 kHz) for east Kent and Hoo (1242 kHz) for west Kent. Both of these were closed on 30th April 2024.

=== Station split - the early years ===
As required by the Home Office to end simulcasting on FM and AM, in March 1989, Invicta Radio became Invicta FM and a sister station, Coast AM began broadcasting on Invicta's AM frequencies. Whilst the company name remained Invicta Sound plc, the expanding operation started to become known as the Invicta Radio Group.

Soon afterwards, separate breakfast shows were broadcast to the following areas:

- East Kent / West Kent: from 15 Station Road East, Canterbury, and later from Whitstable
- Ashford: initially from the Ashford International Hotel; then from Canterbury and later from Whitstable
- Thanet: from 15 Station Road East, Canterbury, and later from Whitstable.

Coast AM was an adult-oriented soft rock station, under the leadership of ex-Capital producer and DJ Kerry Juby, with music programmed by Paul Stafford (Note: Stafford was head of music and "Living on Rock" presenter, 7 – 11 pm weekdays.) Eammon Kelly was the station's first breakfast host. A few months after the launch, Coast AM was renamed Coast Classics. (Note: The jingles sang "Coast Classic".) The service began playing more oldies and, by 1990, it became a fully fledged Golden Oldies station. Throughout this period, Coast was a 24-hour live local station but, in 1991, it started taking a sustaining service from Chiltern Radio Group's expanding AM 'Gold' service, SuperGold. As a result of this change, the station was renamed Invicta Supergold. This helped as research had shown that listeners never fully got used to the station's name, many still calling it "Invicta".

A near-identical set of jingles from JAM were resung with the station's new name and there were no major schedule changes. However, just before this change took place, and for most of summer 1991, presenters at the station were instructed to call the station "Coast Classics Invicta Supergold" on air, to enable listeners to get used to the change. It became a highly popular station and once achieved a 17% reach in a JICRAR survey; some say much to the disgust of its Southern Radio bosses who, it has been said, preferred their AM stations to hover around the 9% mark.

It also lost its identity in 1998, when it became Capital Gold. As Invicta Supergold, the station performed very well and became home to former Invicta FM presenters, such as ex-breakfast presenter Johnny Lewis.

=== Invicta in the 90s ===
In 1991, controversy was sparked as one of the famous DJs, Chris Ryder (aka Caesar the Boogieman), was sacked over criminal charges related to theft from charity. He was ultimately found not guilty on these charges, but was convicted of intent to defraud

Also in 1991, the Maidstone studios and offices were closed; a few months later, the company moved to a brand new, larger, building just outside Whitstable. This was due to the company getting too big for its Canterbury home having started to expand its radio operations beyond Kent. By now, it had acquired a radio station in Frinton, Essex, called Mellow 1557; (Note: Now known as Greatest Hits Radio East.) It also bought a stake in a radio station in Boulogne-sur-Mer, France, which it had relaunched as Continental Invicta FM. Some of Invicta FM's jingles were resung as "Continental FM" and voice overs appeared on the station by presenter Tim Stewart.

Shortly after moving to its Whitstable base, the station was acquired by Southern Radio plc which, in turn, was acquired by Capital Radio plc in May 1994. Mellow 1557 was sold by Southern Radio plc a few months after it took control of the Invicta Radio Group.

New rival commercial stations in the late 1990s were awarded licences in Kent by the Radio Authority. These were TLR (Thanet], Medway FM (Medway Towns), Neptune Radio (Shepway and Dover), CTFM (Canterbury and district) and KFM (Tonbridge and Sevenoaks). These new stations mainly adopted a much larger playlist of songs and, with some major audiences successes (mainly Thanet), they gradually put extra pressure on Invicta's advertising revenue. Most of the stations also employed many familiar ex-Invicta presenters. All of these stations were ultimately taken over by KMFM, which already had its own licence in Ashford.

=== Station split - the later years ===
When Chiltern Radio closed its SuperGold sustaining service, Invicta FM and Invicta Supergold began sharing a single programme overnight. It retained its own separate identity by the use of split FM/AM jingles and an hourly out-of-news separate pre-recorded weather forecast, read over the respective station's weather jingle. However, the presenter simply called it "Invicta" elsewhere in the hour. This usually ran from midnight or 1 am until 6 am, although the later launch of an "early breakfast" programme on Invicta FM meant the overnight presenter would do the last hour on Supergold only.

Invicta Supergold closed down in May 1998, to be replaced by the mainly-networked Capital Gold. The change happened with no promotion, save for a handful of promotions scheduled to run over the weekend prior to the Monday launch. A local Drivetime show was retained, presented initially by Mike Peters, then Peter Fielding. This was ahead of the roll out of Capital Gold across other AM stations owned by the company; the Kent site acted as a test station, chosen in part because of its close proximity to Capital Gold in London, to ensure syndication worked and to iron out any problems.

By September, Capital Gold could also be heard in Birmingham, Sussex, Hampshire and, not long after, South Wales. A while later, the decision was taken to network the Drivetime show, presented by Tony Blackburn, and instead local breakfast shows would be broadcast on each of the local Capital Gold services. Kent's local opt-out show was then presented by Tim Stewart, who moved over from Invicta FM.

Former-BBC Radio 1 DJ Adrian John took over the Kent breakfast show in 2000.

A local breakfast show survived until August 2007, when the Capital Gold owners, GCap Media, purchased the Classic Gold stations from UBC. Ofcom agreed a proposal to move the four-hour local opt-out from breakfast to afternoons. Kent's breakfast show host by now was Neil Winfield, who left the station, and ex-Invicta jock Russ Lowe came in to present the 12-4 slot on weekdays. It was pre-recorded ('voicetracked') and 'music heavy'. As it was recorded especially for the Kent audience of the now-renamed Gold station, it was able to include occasional Kent information and other references to the county. Local news and travel was retained in the Breakfast and Drivetime programmes, and local commercials were broadcast 24 hours a day. All other output was produced at the Gold studios at Leicester Square in London.

=== Invicta in the 00s ===
Capital Radio plc and GWR Group plc merged in 2005; on 1 May that year, the newly enlarged group was renamed GCap Media plc. The first effects of the GCap merger were felt by Invicta FM soon afterwards. New boss Craig Boddy, assisted by GCap management, (Note: Hugh Murray and regional programme boss Peter Sinclair.) undertook a radical restructure of the station in September 2005, in response to falling listening figures and mounting overheads. Boddy changed Invicta from the style influenced by nearby Capital FM, to one that resembled the old Mix Network. Invicta was possibly the last local radio station owned by the company outside London to be live and local 24/7, (Note: This excludes the short-lived Steve Penk late night show heard across the Capital FM network, a Sunday afternoon show presented by Cat Deeley and Edith Bowman, and the weekly chart show) escaping overnight networking and voicetracking at times when Capital Radio-owned stablemates like Ocean, Southern and Power succumbed to one or the other.

The new relaunched Invicta carried the first of the GWR straplines, "The best mix of the 80s, 90s and today" from Monday 19 September 2005. The second strapline "Today's Best Mix", was introduced on Monday 28 August 2006.

In May 2008, both Craig Boddy and regional programme director Peter Sinclair left; in July 2008, former Invicta FM and KMFM programme controller Mike Osborne was appointed to the newly created role of programme director

On 30 June 2008, following the relaxation of Ofcom regulations on networking, the new owners of GCap Media, Global Radio, cut minimum local programming to ten hours on weekdays (from 6 to 10 am and 1 to 7 pm) and four hours on Saturdays & Sundays (from 8 am to 12 pm). The changes signalled the end of some long-running programmes, including Party Invicta and an increase in networked output, including the mid-morning show with Philippa Collins (aired from 10 am to 1 pm). Andy Walker presented the local 1 pm – 4 pm show until December 2008, when he was replaced by former night-time presenter Stephen Sullivan, with Neil Kefford hosting the 4 pm – 7 pm slot.

In common with most of its sister stations, most modern music and rock music had by now been dropped by Invicta, in favour of a bigger concentration of older music, as far back to the late 1970s in a few cases and up to three 1980s songs an hour. Its sound was similar to a younger version of another Global Radio station, Heart. All stations affected now shared the same playlist (Note: For example, Invicta FM played the same songs in the same order as sister station Essex FM.) and the strapline also mirrored Heart's "More Music Variety", as did the name of the now renamed 'guess the year' feature, The Time Tunnel.

=== "Heart is coming", 2009 ===
In September 2008, it was reported that Invicta, along with 28 other local radio stations, would be rebounded as "Heart" with local programming reduced to Breakfast and Drivetime shows on weekdays, and a four-hour show on Saturdays and Sundays. Whilst the station was still known on air as Invicta FM, airtime on the station was sold nationally as part of the Heart Network.

The station was amongst the final phase of stations to be rebranded, becoming Heart on 22 June 2009. Two months before the rebrand, the station was referred to as "The Heart of Kent". Two weeks before the rebrand, all references to the Invicta FM name were removed and trailers advertising "Heart is coming" were played after every song. This changed to "Heart is here" following the rebrand.

Network programming was overseen by group programme director of the Heart Network, Luis Clark, who was programme director of Invicta FM between 1999 and 2000.

=== Closure ===
On 26 February 2019, Global confirmed Heart Kent would be merged with sister stations in the south and south-east of England by the end of the year.

Under relaxed OFCOM requirements for local content, the station was allowed to share all programmes with another six licences located in the ITV Meridian region, which previously broadcast under three Heart stations (Solent, Sussex & Surrey and Thames Valley).

As of June 2019, regional output on the merged Heart South station consisted of a three-hour Drivetime show on weekdays, alongside local news bulletins, traffic updates and advertising. Heart Kent's Whitstable studios closed with operations moving to studios at Fareham, in Hampshire. Local breakfast and weekend shows were replaced with network programming from London.

Heart Kent ceased local broadcasting at 7pm on 31 May 2019. Heart South broadcast regional programming from 3 June 2019 until 2025, when it switched to full network service. Advertising remains split between east and west Kent on FM.

== Breakfast shows ==
For some time, the station ran four breakfast shows from Whitstable: Invicta Supergold, Invicta FM (102.8 and 103.1, and in Dover and Folkestone on 97.0), Invicta FM Ashford (96.1) and Invicta FM Thanet (95.9). The different programmes all took the same news and sport bulletins, but had different presenters.

The split FM breakfast was discontinued with the launch of The Invicta FM Morning Zoo in 1995; this was the brainchild of then programme controller Sandy Beech.

For a time after the launch of the new countywide breakfast show, commercial breaks continued to be split four ways during the Drivetime show on Invicta FM; with East, West, Thanet and Ashford as the four sub-areas.

The Morning Zoo was a fixture of the Invicta FM schedule for many years. The show launched with Neil Francis and Simon Beale at the helm ("Neily and Bealey"), with Simon being replaced by Sam Hughes in 1997. Neil and Sam were later joined by Mark Anthony in the 'Flying Eye'.

From 2000, James Heming was the lead presenter of the Morning Zoo following the departure of Neil Francis, who left to join the line-up of 95.8 Capital FM in London. The last Morning Zoo was broadcast on Friday 22 December 2006. The breakfast show was rebranded "James and Ali in the morning" at the beginning of 2007.

From May 2008, the show became known as "James Heming in the Morning", following Ali Wheeler's departure from the station to have her first child. From November 2008 to December 2010, James had a new co-host, Gemma Shepherd, and the show became known as "Invicta FM Breakfast with James and Gemma", and subsequently as "Heart Breakfast with James and Gemma".

James gained Charlie O'Brien on 24 January 2011. O'Brien left Heart on Christmas Eve 2014 and was replaced by Becky Ives at the start of 2015. Both Heming and Ives left Heart Kent on 24 May 2019, one week before the station ceased all local programming.

== Notable former presenters ==
- Andy Archer
- Bam Bam (later at Galaxy 105, then Kiss 100 and Capital 95.8)
- Paddy Bunce
- Caesar the Geezer
- Dave Cash (later at BBC Radio Kent; now deceased)
- Ian Collins (now at Talk)
- Roger Day
- Don Durbridge (previously at BBC Radio 1, later at BBC Radio Kent; now deceased)
- Rick Edwards (now at BBC Radio 5 Live)
- Caroline Feraday (later LBC 97.3 and BBC South East Today)
- Nino Firetto (later Super Channel and Exeter FM)
- Nigel Harris (formerly at KMFM Shepway and White Cliffs Country; currently at Radio Caroline)
- Kerry Juby (deceased)
- Johnny Lewis (went to TLR then KMFM), now Academy FM (Thanet) and Radio Caroline
- Pete Tong (now at BBC Radio 1).
