= KMFM Thanet =

English radio station

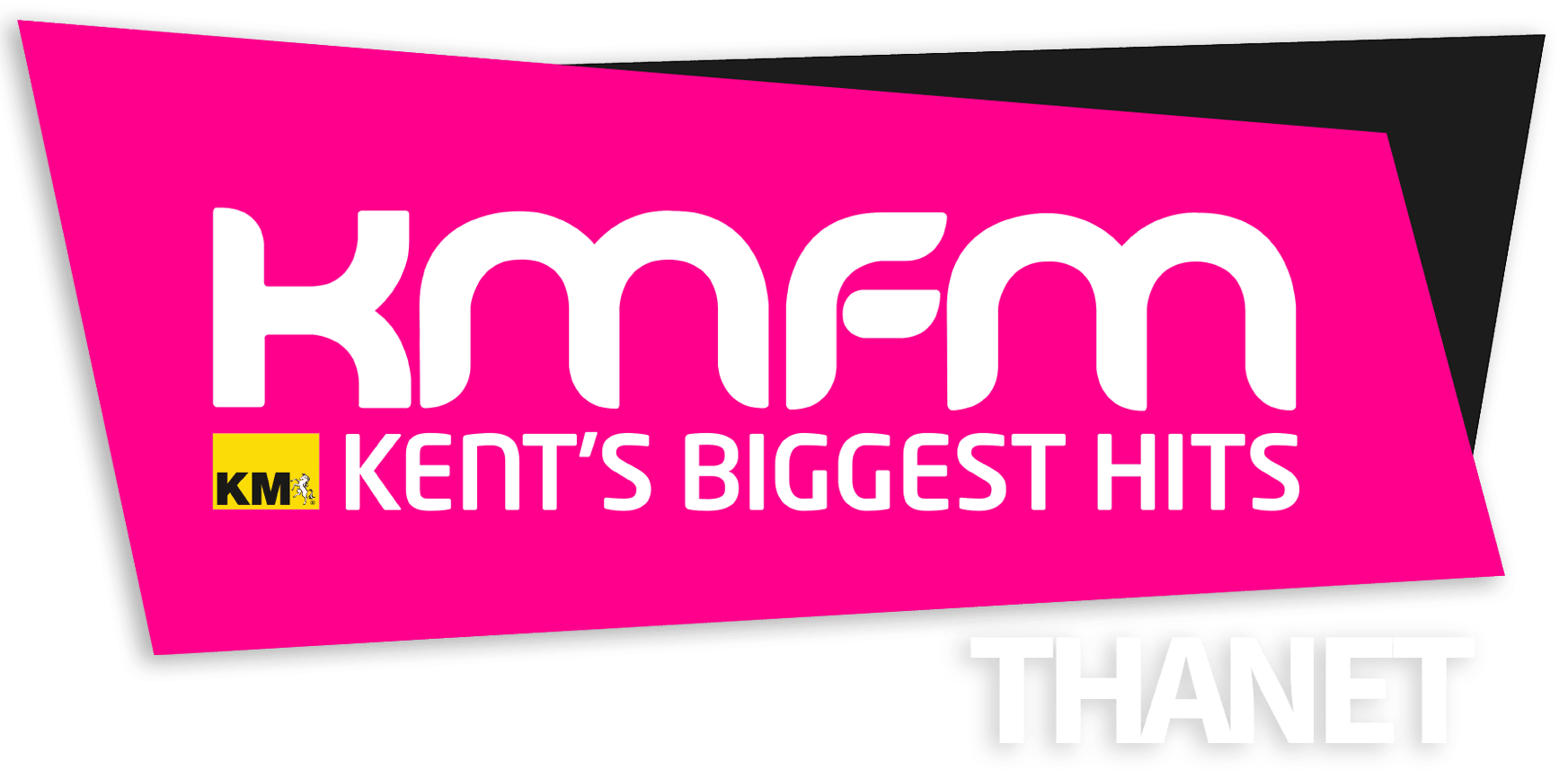

England
- Broadcast area: Margate, Ramsgate, Broadstairs and Sandwich
- Frequency: FM: 107.2 MHz
- RDS: __KMFM__

Programming
- Format: Contemporary hit radio
- Network: KMFM

Ownership
- Owner: KM Group

History
- First air date: 17 January 1998
- Former names: TLR (Thanet Local Radio) (until 2003)

Technical information
- Transmitter coordinates: 51°21′20″N 1°24′32″E

Links
- Website: www.kmfm.co.uk

KMFM Thanet is an Independent Local Radio serving the Isle of Thanet and the surrounding areas in Kent, South East England. It is the Thanet region of the KMFM radio network (owned by the KM Group), containing local advertisements and sponsorships for the area amongst a countywide schedule of programming.

== History ==
KMFM Thanet began life as Thanet Local Radio (TLR 107.2), founded by Alan Mackay, Ken Wills and Pete Willson (now station manager at Academy FM), and launching in January 1998 from studios at Margate harbour. The launch was not without drama – four months prior, the Radio Authority gave the station the green light on the licence after some alleged internal legal wrangles between the company's directors.

Pete Willson was the first voice on-air; the first song to be played was Take That's "Back For Good", with reggae star Pato Banton recording a special version of his duet with UB40, "Baby Come Back", for the station's launch. The station's line-up was largely unchanged for five years.

TLR was originally owned by a consortium of local investors, with local businessman Ken Wills being the majority shareholder. The KM Group took control of TLR in 1999, and subsequently bought out the other investors in March 2003; rebranding the station to KMFM Thanet and relocating it to their own premises in Cliftonville. Following the arrival of the county-wide breakfast, all KMFM programming is now broadcast from Medway.

It was the first station to be fully owned by the KM Group.

The licence was readvertised in September 2008, with the KM Group reawarded it.

Like the rest of the KMFM network, the station was relaunched in September 2010 with new jingles, schedule changes and more emphasis on music.

The KMFM network switched to a contemporary hit radio format in 2012 following the merging of KMFM Extra with KMFM. The music now focuses mainly on Top 40 hits, and contains a lot more dance and R&B than before.

== Programming ==
All programming across the KMFM network is now shared across all seven stations following OFCOM approval in February 2012. The local breakfast show, by then the only local show on the station, was replaced by a county-wide show on 12 March 2012.

Until 2007, KMFM Thanet produced its own programmes during daytimes, before it joined up with KMFM Canterbury to network all programmes other than breakfast. The stations joined with KMFM Ashford and KMFM Shepway and White Cliffs Country to create an East Kent network in April 2009, before all programmes apart from weekday/Saturday breakfast and Sunday afternoons were networked across all KMFM stations in September 2009. In July 2010, Saturday breakfast and Sunday afternoons became networked.

News bulletins are provide by KMFM News Centre in the Medway studios, and national news by Sky News Radio at other times.

== Notable presenters ==
Former presenters include Doc Atherton, Tony Blackburn, Nigel Harris, Dominic King. Johnny Lewis, Tom Lowe, Dave Pearce, Myma Seldon, Benedict Smith and Melanie Sykes.
