= KMFM Ashford =

English radio station

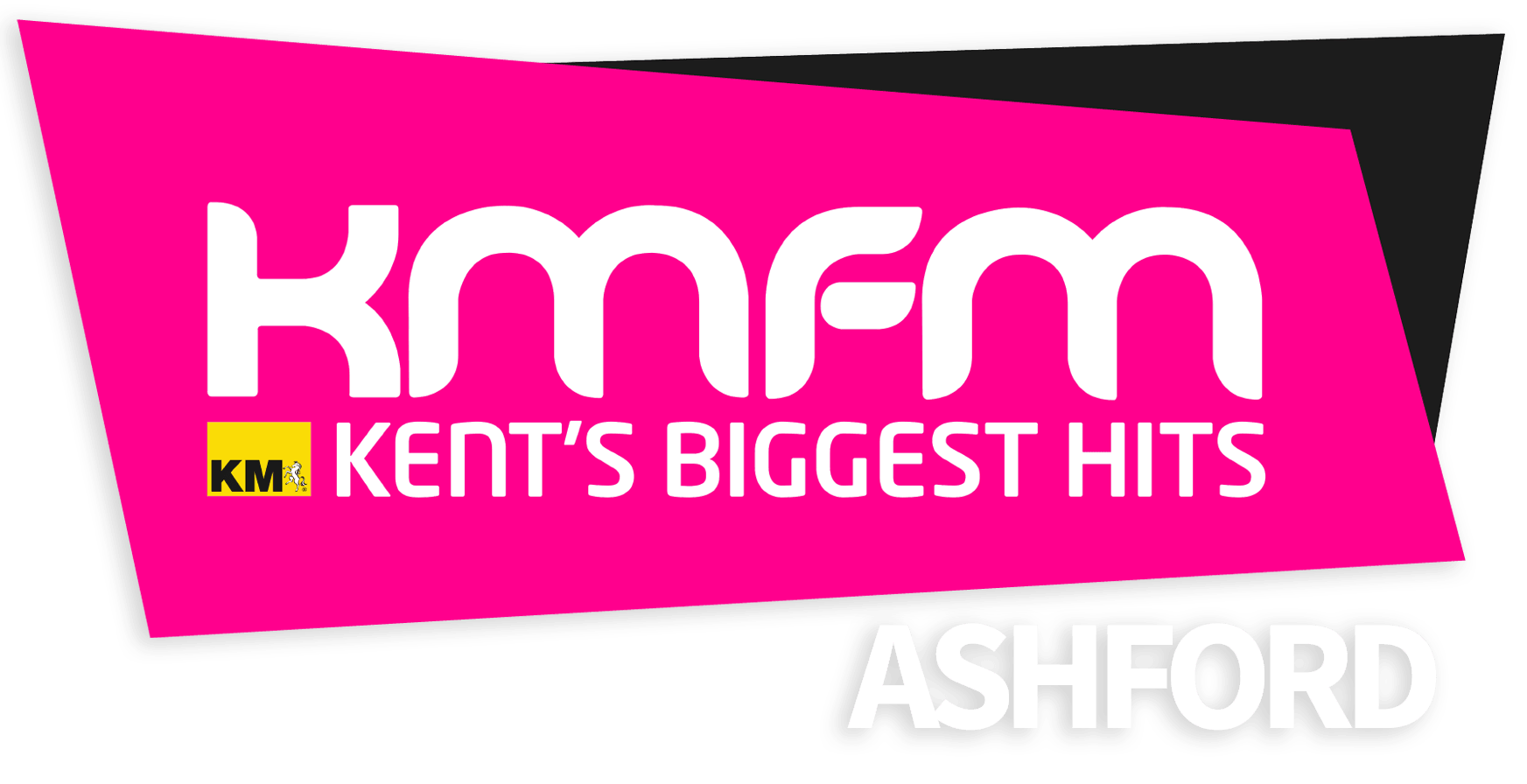
- England
- Broadcast area: Ashford, Tenterden, Romney Marsh
- Frequency: FM: 107.6 MHz
- RDS: __KMFM__

Programming
- Format: Contemporary hit radio
- Network: KMFM

Ownership
- Owner: KM Group

History
- First air date: 3 October 2005
- Former names: LARK FM (never used on air)

Technical information
- Transmitter coordinates: 51.1502°N 0.8749°E

Links
- Website: www.kmfm.co.uk

KMFM Ashford is an Independent Local Radio serving the Borough of Ashford and the surrounding areas in Kent, South East England. It is the Ashford region of the KMFM radio network (owned by the KM Group), containing local advertisements and sponsorships for the area amongst a countywide schedule of programming.

== History ==
A radio station for Ashford was considered in 2001 by the Radio Authority, as Ashford was the only borough in East Kent not to be granted a licence in the mid-1990s, but the applications for the Ashford licence were not advertised by Ofcom until July 2004, with six companies making the final shortlist. Restricted service licences were broadcast by some of these companies, including Ashford FM between 1996 and 2002 on 106.5 FM, and Ashford Local Radio in 2003.

The licence was awarded to an organisation called LARK FM (Local Ashford Radio Kent) in which the KM Group had a majority stake, with the station broadcasting under the KMFM brand already used by five other stations in Kent. KMFM Ashford officially launched on 3 October 2005. This decision caused a High Court Challenge by rival bidder A-Ten FM, with the chairman claiming "Ofcom have failed in their principal duty to encourage competition and diversity of choice for listeners. They have ignored what Parliament intended and, more importantly, what the people of Ashford wanted. Although I believe some local people supported the trial broadcasts of Lark FM, what KM are now offering bears no resemblance. Even the local news bulletins will be piped in from elsewhere in Kent". This challenge was subsequently lost.

The frequency allocated to the new station was 107.6 MHz which had previously been used by Channel Travel Radio from August 1995 until its demise in September 2000. Channel Travel Radio had broadcast along the M20 motorway, which included Ashford.

After the station's launch, it achieved a 42% reach in its first RAJAR sweep.

It shared offices with sister paper the Kentish Express, before being moved to the Medway studios following the arrival of the county-wide breakfast show.

Like the rest of the KMFM network, the station was relaunched in September 2010 with new jingles, schedule changes and more emphasis on music.

The KMFM network switched to a contemporary hit radio format in 2012 following the merging of KMFM Extra with KMFM. The music now focuses mainly on Top 40 hits and contains a lot more dance and R&B than before.

== Programming ==
All programming across the KMFM network was shared across all seven stations following OFCOM approval in February 2012. The local breakfast show, by then the only local show on the station, was replaced by a county-wide show on 12 March 2012.

Until 2007, KMFM Ashford produced its own programmes during daytimes, before it joined up with KMFM Shepway and White Cliffs Country to network all programmes other than breakfast. The stations joined with KMFM Canterbury and KMFM Thanet to create an East Kent network in April 2009, before all programmes apart from weekday/Saturday breakfast and Sunday afternoons were networked across all KMFM stations in September 2009. In July 2010, Saturday breakfast and Sunday afternoons became networked.

News bulletins come from the KMFM News Centre in the Medway studios on the hour from 6 am - 6 pm on weekdays, and 8 am - 1 pm on weekends. National news bulletins come from Sky News Radio outside these times. Traffic and travel updates are broadcast just before the hour, and every 20 minutes between 7 am - 9 am and 4 pm - 7 pm.

== Presenters ==
=== Former presenters ===
- Myma Seldon
- Benedict Smith
- Melanie Sykes
- Tony Blackburn
- Dave Pearce
