= KMFM Canterbury =

English radio station

Coordinates: 51°16′38″N 1°5′4″E

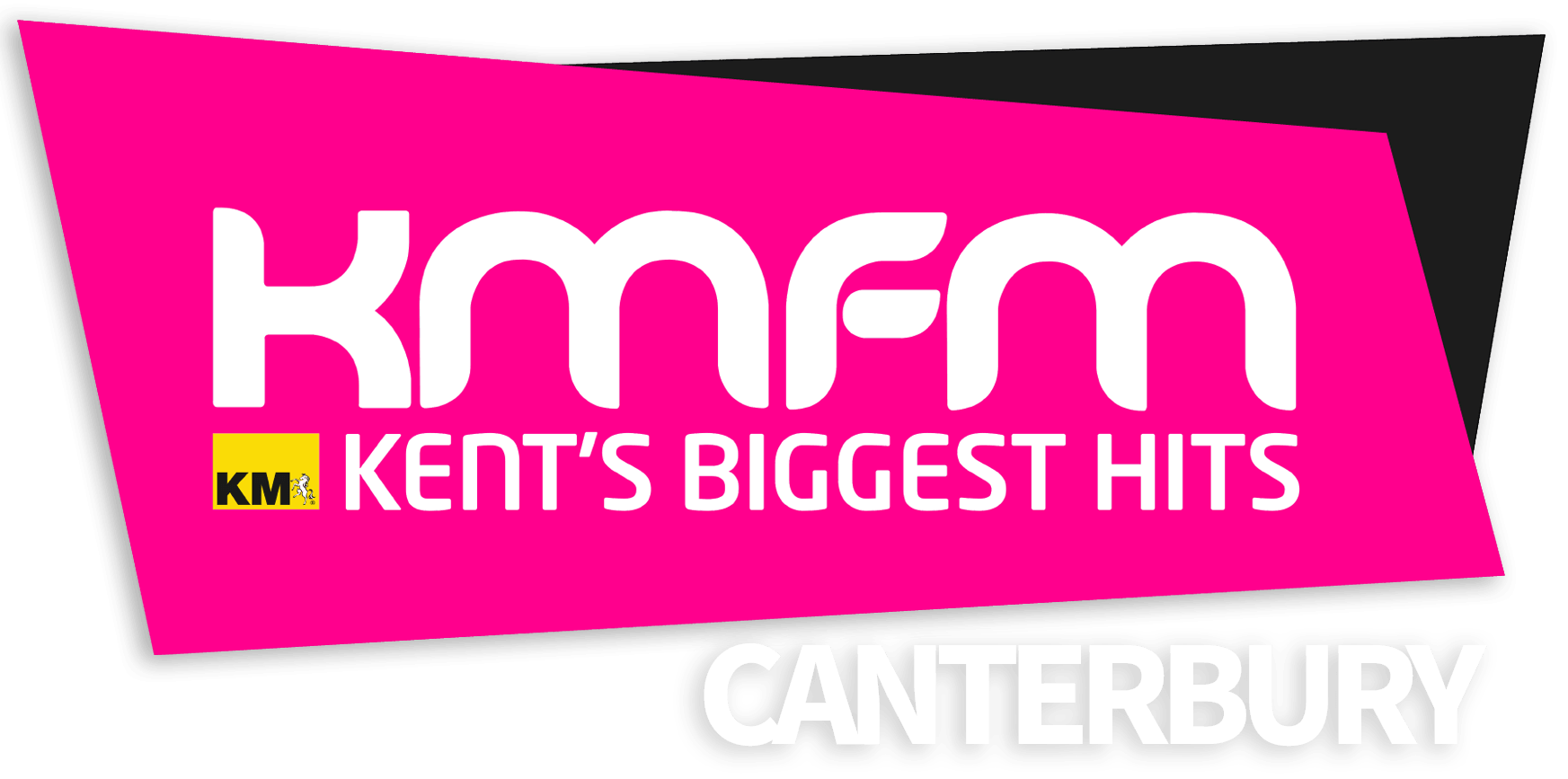

England
- Broadcast area: Canterbury, Whitstable and Herne Bay
- Frequency: FM: 106.0 MHz
- RDS: __KMFM__

Programming
- Format: Contemporary hit radio
- Network: KMFM

Ownership
- Owner: KM Group

History
- First air date: 21 September 1997
- Former names: CTFM (until 2002)

Links
- Website: www.kmfm.co.uk

KMFM Canterbury is an Independent Local Radio serving the City of Canterbury and the surrounding areas in Kent, South East England. It is the Canterbury region of the KMFM radio network (owned by the KM Group), containing local advertisements and sponsorships for the area amongst a countywide schedule of programming.

== History ==
The station began broadcasting in 1997 as 106 CTFM to Canterbury, Whitstable and Herne Bay. It originally broadcast from studios on Lower Bridge Street in Canterbury.

The KM Group increased their involvement in the station's day-to-day running in October 2000 with a re-launch and programming re-direction. The station became the fastest growing in the UK in terms of listenership with a 48% increase in listening in Q4 RAJAR 2000 (in part due to highly successful sponsorship deal with the University of Kent Cricket Club) and a 500% increase in peak listening, during the Ian St James breakfast show. The KM Group took full control of the station in 2001, following a "public interest test" due to laws preventing a newspaper group owning a radio station in the same area unless it was found not to be against the public interest. The station was rebranded to KMFM Canterbury the following year, moving the studios to the Kentish Gazette offices.

In 2001 programme sharing initially began on Saturday nights with Brian Jones presenting his show across TLR and CTFM. The KM Group later took control of Neptune Radio, after which programme sharing began across all three neighbouring East Kent stations.

In 2008, following Ofcom approval, the studios and presenters were allowed to move to the KMFM Ashford building, although the sales teams continue to be based in Canterbury. Following the arrival of the county-wide breakfast, all KMFM programming is now broadcast from Medway.

Like the rest of the KMFM network, the station was relaunched in September 2010 with new jingles, schedule changes and more emphasis on music.

The KMFM network switched to a contemporary hit radio format in 2012 following the merging of KMFM Extra with KMFM. The music now focuses mainly on Top 40 hits, and contains a lot more dance and R&B than before.

== Programming ==
All programming across the KMFM network is now shared across all seven stations following OFCOM approval in February 2012. The local breakfast show, by then the only local show on the station, was replaced by a county-wide show on 12 March 2012.

Until 2007 KMFM Canterbury produced its own programmes during daytimes, before it joined up with KMFM Thanet to network all programmes other than breakfast. The stations joined with KMFM Ashford and KMFM Shepway and White Cliffs Country to create an East Kent network in April 2009, before all programmes apart from weekday/Saturday breakfast and Sunday afternoons were networked across all KMFM stations in September 2009. In July 2010, Saturday breakfast and Sunday afternoons became networked.

News bulletins come from the KMFM News Centre in the Medway studios on the hour from 6am – 6pm on weekdays, and 8am – 1pm on weekends. National news bulletins come from Sky News Radio outside these times. Traffic and travel updates are broadcast just before the hour, and every 20 minutes between 7am – 9am and 4pm – 7pm.

== Presenters ==
=== Former presenters ===
A few former presenters

- Tony Blackburn
- Nigel Harris
- Jon Holmes
- Johnny Lewis
- Dave Pearce
- Myma Seldon
- Benedict Smith
- Melanie Sykes
