= KMTV =

KMTV may refer to:

- KMTV-TV (channel 3), a television station in Omaha, Nebraska, United States
- KMTV (Kent), a local television service in Kent, England
- KMTV Asia, a television channel in South Korea
