= Nigel MacArthur =

British broadcaster

- Presenting career
- Show: Nigel Harris
- Station: Radio Caroline
- Time slot: 2pm to 5pm Friday
- Style: Radio Presenter
- Country: United Kingdom

Nigel MacArthur, also known as Stuart Russell and Nigel Harris, is a freelance broadcaster in Kent on Radio Caroline, EKR and KMFM.

== Career ==
MacArthur's first job was at the offshore station Radio Caroline in the late seventies, under the "Stuart Russell" moniker. The radioship, the Mi Amigo, sank in a storm in 1980 putting the station off the air for several years. He returned in 1984 aboard the station's new ship, the Ross Revenge, and adopted the name "Nigel Harris" a few years later. Like most Caroline DJs at the time he used an alias to ensure anonymity.

He was on board the Ross Revenge for the collapse of its famous 300-foot-tall (91 m) mast in a 1987 storm, and was filming inside the ship as the event took place. He was also there for the illegal British / Dutch raid which silenced the station for a while in 1989. He was appointed programme controller in 1989 and was the last person to hold this position whilst Radio Caroline was at sea.

He worked on the Voice of peace in Israel in the early nineties before going to Invicta FM in 1992. There followed work at Essex FM and satellite station EKR. In 1995 he was involved in Cruise FM, an RSL station in Sittingbourne and Swale which broadcast on 107.6 and today Nigel continues his Radio Caroline connections broadcasting from studios in Medway. He currently works for one of Kent's major broadcasters, KMFM, previously hosting the weekend breakfast show on KMFM Canterbury and the Sunday afternoon show on KMFM Shepway and White Cliffs Country.

== Choir activities ==
MacArthur attended St Edmund's School in Canterbury, Kent where he studied organ under John Brough and is Organist at St Michael's Church in Sittingbourne, Kent and plays for all the major services in church. Concerts and recitals take place in St Michael's Church throughout the year with the Canterbury Cathedral choir visiting in the summer of 2006. The St Michael's Choir and organists visit other churches to sing Evensong including several visits to Rochester Cathedral.

== Publications ==
MacArthur has recently written a book, Ships in Troubled Waters, (ISBN 978-0-9563996-0-1) which details his life at boarding school and on several offshore radio stations, including Radio Caroline, the Voice of Peace and the offshore Radio Paradise.
