= Bluebell Hill transmitting station =

Broadcasting facility in Kent, England

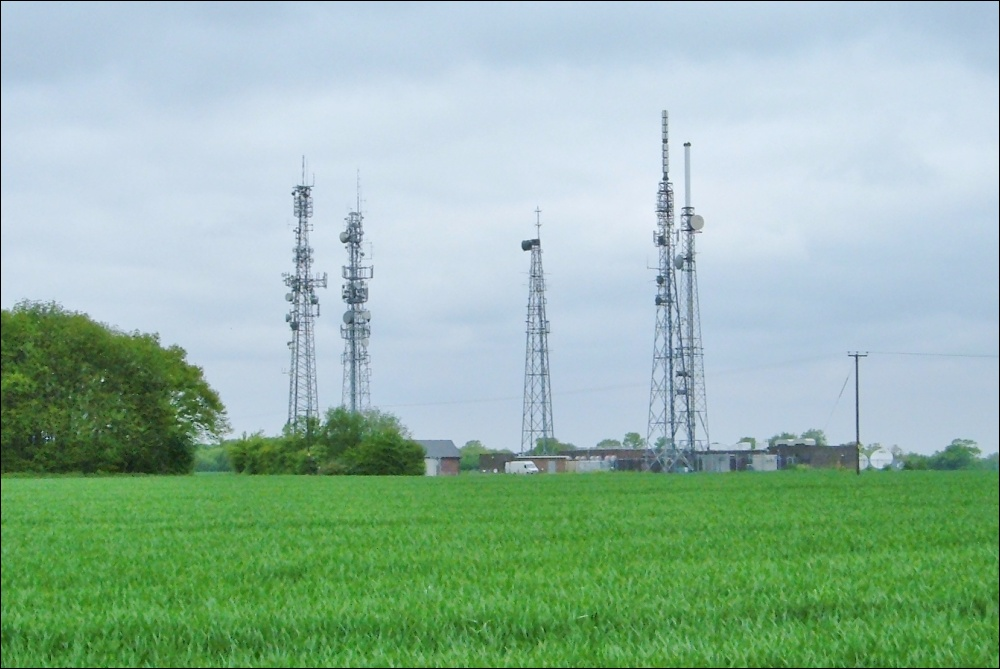

- Location within Kent
- Tower height: 52.5 metres (172 ft) (A); 51.3 metres (168 ft) (B); 46 metres (151 ft) (C); 43 metres (141 ft) (South)
- Coordinates: 51.324°N 0.52054°E
- Grid reference: TQ757613
- Built: 1974
- BBC region: BBC South East
- ITV region: ITV Meridian (East)
- Local TV service: KMTV

The Bluebell Hill transmitting station is a broadcasting and telecommunications facility on Blue Bell Hill, between Maidstone and Rochester in the English county of Kent.

The station stands on the crest of the North Downs and comprises five steel lattice towers, each 45 to 50 metres tall – their height being limited by the presence nearby of Rochester Airport. It broadcasts digital television, FM and DAB radio to much of north, west, and central Kent, and an overspill service into southern Essex. It stopped broadcasting analogue television when the digital switchover was completed on 27 June 2012. When in analogue service, the broadcast power of 30 kW for a main transmitter was unique in the United Kingdom, the strength being limited by potential interference with transmitters in France and the Low Countries. Four of the towers are used for broadcast services, with the fifth used for general communications.

Between its opening in 1974 and 31 December 1981, the transmitter site broadcast Thames Television on weekdays and London Weekend Television at weekends. From 1 January 1982 it carried signals from the new ITV franchise TVS (Television South), until superseded on 1 January 1993 by ITV Meridian (East) for ITV in the south east.

This transmitter has four relays: Chatham Town, Farleigh, Gillingham Testing Centre and Sittingbourne.

Bluebell Hill was originally an E group for analogue, then became a B group at digital switchover. After 700 MHz clearance in July 2018 it became a K group (excluding the temporary MUXES 7 and 8). Most E group and B group aerials, as well as widebands and K groups, will work satisfactorily with Bluebell Hill.

North western parts of Kent – such as Dartford, Swanley, Westerham, Gravesend, and much of Sevenoaks cannot get television signals from the Bluebell Hill transmitter but instead receive ITV London/BBC London from the Crystal Palace transmitter.

FM broadcasting started from Bluebell Hill on 1 October 1984 when Invicta Sound (now Heart) launched. KMFM Maidstone was added much later on 28 July 2025. DAB services started on 1 September 1997 with the BBC National DAB multiplex.

== Services available ==
=== Analogue radio ===
| Frequency | kW | Service |
|---|---|---|
| 103.1 MHz | 2 | Heart South |
| 105.6 MHz | 0.5 | KMFM Maidstone |

=== Digital radio ===
| Frequency | Block | kW | Operator |
|---|---|---|---|
| 218.640 MHz | 11B | 0.9 | DRG London |
| 220.352 MHz | 11C | 2 | NOW Kent |
| 222.064 MHz | 11D | 6.3 | Digital One |
| 223.936 MHz | 12A | 2 | Switch London |
| 225.648 MHz | 12B | 6.3 | BBC National DAB |
| 227.360 MHz | 12C | 1 | CE London |

=== Digital television ===
on the 19th of July 2018, the Frequencies went to use due to the 700MHZ Clearance Programme,

| Frequency | UHF | kW | Operator | System |
|---|---|---|---|---|
| 650.000 MHz | 43 | 20 | Arqiva A | DVB-T |
| 666.000 MHz | 45 | 20 | BBC B | DVB-T2 |
| 578.000 MHz | 34 | 20 | Digital 3&4 | DVB-T |
| 626.000 MHz | 40 | 20 | SDN | DVB-T |
| 562.000 MHz | 32 | 20 | BBC A | DVB-T |
| 674.000 MHz | 46 | 20 | Arqiva B | DVB-T |
| 474.000 MHz | 21 | 1 | KMTV (Kent) | DVB-T |

==== Before switchover ====
| Frequency | UHF | kW | Operator |
|---|---|---|---|
| 498.000 MHz | 24 | 2 | Digital 3&4 (Mux 2) |
| 522.000 MHz | 27 | 2 | SDN (Mux A) |
| 618.000 MHz | 39 | 3 | Arqiva (Mux D) |
| 641.833 MHz | 42- | 3 | Arqiva (Mux C) |
| 665.833 MHz | 45- | 3 | BBC (Mux B) |
| 778.000 MHz | 59 | 3 | BBC (Mux 1) |

=== Analogue television ===
Analogue television transmissions have now ceased. BBC2 was closed on 13 June 2012 and the remaining three services on 27 June. Channel 5 was never broadcast in analogue from this transmitter site.

| Frequency | UHF | kW | Service |
|---|---|---|---|
| 623.25 MHz | 40 | 30 | BBC1 South East |
| 647.25 MHz | 43 | 30 | Meridian |
| 671.25 MHz | 46 | 30 | BBC2 South East |
| 823.25 MHz | 65 | 30 | Channel 4 |
