= Myma Seldon =

British broadcaster

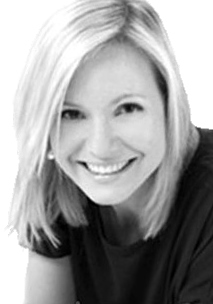
- Born: Jemima Seldon; 9 August 1979 (age 47); Farnborough, London, England
- Presenting career
- Style: Disc Jockey
- Country: England
- Previous show: KMFM
- Website: myma.co.uk

Myma Seldon (born 9 August 1979) is a British television and radio presenter and voiceover artist.

== Background ==
Seldon was born Jemima Seldon on 9 August 1979 in Farnborough, London, England. She has a 2:1 English/Philosophy B.A. (Hons) from Leeds University.

== Career ==
Seldon began her career presenting the 7pm–10pm evening show for Liberty Radio, a London-based music and talk station. She then presented Liberty Radio's 11am-3pm weekday show before moving to Invicta FM, Capital Radio's biggest regional station.

After moving to KMFM, she presented the "Drivetime" show on the three western KMFM stations (KMFM Maidstone, KMFM Medway and KMFM West Kent) and was also the Regional Programme Controller (West) for the KMFM group.

On television, Seldon has presented for ITV, CBBC, Eurosport and Challenge. She also presents on World of Motorsport on UK digital satellite stations Sky Sports 1, 2, 3 and Extra.

She appeared in the February 2002 issue of FHM in a feature on the UK's most attractive radio presenters, making the top six. Unbeknownst to her, a friend sent off a photo to the magazine. The first she knew of it was when she got a call saying she had made the top seven.

In 2012 she moved to Australia, where she works as a professional voiceover and radio coach.
