= KMFM Medway =

English radio station

Coordinates: 51°23′25″N 0°30′53″E

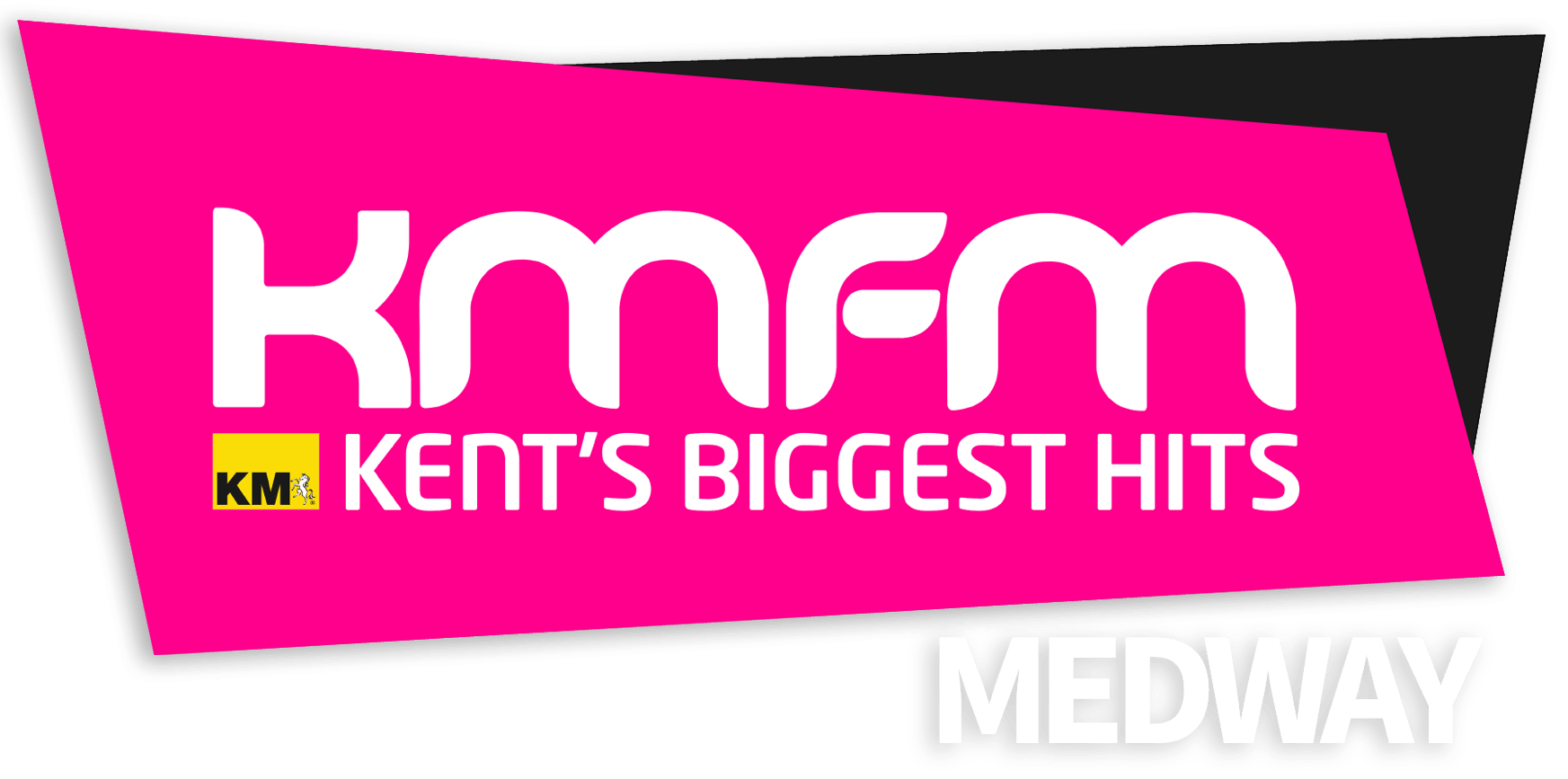
- Strood; England
- Broadcast area: Medway, Kent
- Frequencies: FM: 100.4 MHz (Hoo peninsula); 107.9 MHz (Medway towns)
- RDS: KMFM

Programming
- Format: Contemporary hit radio
- Network: KMFM

Ownership
- Owner: KM Group

History
- First air date: 1 September 1997
- Former names: Medway FM (1997–2000); Mercury FM (2000–2002)

Links
- Website: www.kmfm.co.uk

KMFM Medway is an Independent Local Radio serving the Medway Towns and the surrounding areas in Kent, South East England. It is the Medway region of the KMFM radio network (owned by the KM Group), containing local advertisements and sponsorships for the area amongst a countywide schedule of programming.

== History ==
KMFM Medway launched on 1 September 1997 as Medway FM, broadcasting on 100.4 and 107.9 FM, following a four-year campaign. The station was fined £5,000 during its first year of operation by the Radio Authority after it intentionally adjusted the power of its transmitter on two separate occasions, which was against the terms set out in the licence.

The station was later purchased by DMG Radio in 2000 and subsequently re-branded to Medway's Mercury FM, as the firm wished to brand all its local stations by the same name. A year later DMG sold their radio assets to GWR who, in 2002, sold the station to the Kent Messenger Group following the problem of the group's "station ownership point" as stipulated by the Radio Authority. The station was re-branded to KMFM Medway in September that year.

In 2004, KMFM Medway was relocated from premises on Rochester High Street to Medway House on Medway City Estate in Strood, where it shares an office with the KM-owned Medway Messenger.

Like the rest of the KMFM network, the station was relaunched in September 2010 with new jingles, schedule changes and more emphasis on music.

The KMFM network switched to a contemporary hit radio format in 2012 following the merging of KMFM Extra with KMFM. The music now focuses mainly on Top 40 hits, and contains a lot more dance and R&B than before.

== Programming ==
All programming across the KMFM network is now shared across all seven stations following OFCOM approval in February 2012. The local breakfast show, by then the only local show on the station, was replaced by a county-wide show on 12 March 2012.

Until 2007 KMFM Medway produced its own programmes during daytimes. It joined up with KMFM West Kent and KMFM Maidstone to create a West Kent network in April 2009, before all programmes apart from weekday/Saturday breakfast and Sunday afternoons were networked across all KMFM stations in September 2009. In July 2010, Saturday breakfast and Sunday afternoons became networked.

News bulletins come from the KMFM News Centre in the Medway studios on the hour from 6 am - 6 pm on weekdays, and 8 am - 1 pm on weekends. National news bulletins come from Sky News Radio outside these times. Traffic and travel updates are broadcast just before the hour, and every 20 minutes between 7 am - 9 am and 4 pm - 7 pm.

== Presenters ==
=== Current presenters ===
- Emma Adams
- Olivia Jones
- Aaron Matthews
- Ed Matthews
- Ben Pearce
- Emma Scott
- Andy Walker
- Rob Wills
- Garry Wilson

=== Former presenters ===
A few former presenters

- Tony Blackburn
- Johnny Lewis
- Dave Pearce
- Myma Seldon
- Benedict Smith
- Melanie Sykes
