= Kerry Juby =

Kerry Juby (3 January 1948 – July 2003) was born in Bexley, South London and was a radio DJ who worked for Pirate Radio Station Radio Caroline in the 1960s (initially as an engineer) under the name Kerry Clarke. When London's Capital Radio started in 1973 he presented 'Person To Person' for an hour on Sunday mornings, linking with hospital radio stations, as well as 'Underneath The Arches' on Sunday evenings, aimed at over-60s.

By June 1974, Juby was also doing breakfast on Saturday mornings. In 1975 he was no longer hosting the first two programmes but was presenter/producer of 'Kerry-Go-Round', aimed at younger listeners and broadcast at 07:00 on Saturday and Sunday mornings. When this programme ended, he continued in the same slot, hosting a weekend breakfast show. He then dedicated more time to producing two weekend magazine shows in "Hullabaloo" and "Sunday Supplement" for the station in addition to working on other outside projects such as the Stage Broadcast Company, which provided the Capital Radio Video Show throughout the 80s and Voicebox Sound Equipment.

While at Capital Radio, Juby produced several features on the working lives of ordinary people and communities, including a profile of the Thames bargemen, called Lighmen and Watermen, and a programme on the Hastings fishing community. His combination of engineering and presenting skills allowed him to have strong editorial control over his work. Like John Peel, Juby was never completely comfortable with any aspect of fame that accompanied simply being 'on the radio', preferring to focus on the quality of his output and creating programmes of real listener interest.

Subsequently, he worked for Kent-based ILR station Invicta Radio, where he was instrumental in setting up Coast AM after the station's FM/AM frequencies were separated. After the success of Coast Am, where he launched the career of amongst others Paul Stafford, Eamon Kelly and Simon Lee he was promoted to head of Invicta Group, before joining Talk Radio UK as a freelance producer. Kerry worked for Classic FM producing Masterclass a programme designed for the young that helped explain classical music.

Kerry Juby also invented the name "Orange" for the famous Orange amplifiers that are used today.

He was the author of books about Kate Bush ("Kate Bush" ISBN 0-283-99721-4) and David Bowie ("David Bowie In other words" ISBN 0-7119-1038-3)

He died of lung cancer in July 2003 at the age of 55.
