= KMFM Extra =

English radio station

Coordinates: 51°23′23.5″N 0°30′53″E

England
- Broadcast area: Kent
- Frequency: DAB (NOW Kent multiplex)

Programming
- Format: Pop

Ownership
- Owner: KM Group

History
- First air date: 1 May 2004
- Last air date: 25 June 2012

Links
- Website: http://www.kmfmextra.co.uk

KMFM Extra was a DAB radio station based in Rochester and broadcasting to the county of Kent, South East England. It was part of the KMFM group of radio stations in the county, which are part of the KM Group.

The station offered a "cutting edge alternative" to KMFM which played everything from Girls Aloud to Kanye West. The station broadcast from the Medway studios and featured non-stop music, apart from commercials and the hourly news bulletins containing local and entertainment news. KMFM Extra was available through parts of Kent, although not near the coastal area due to weak DAB signals.

The station was based on Sir Thomas Longley Road in Rochester, along with KMFM Medway.

== History ==
The station was launched as km-d on 1 May 2004. Due to the fact that the NOW Kent multiplex was county-wide, the then 5 local KMFM stations were unable to be broadcast on DAB. The KM Group launched km-d as a county-wide service instead. One year later the name was changed to KMFM Digital, to incorporate the KMFM name into the station.

Former KMFM Extra logo, prior to January 2011

It relaunched in 2008 with its final name and a new slogan, "Fresh Hits for Kent"; changing from adult contemporary to pop music.

In 2010 the station's schedule was overhauled. The station promised to update its playlist "as and when new tracks drop from the labels", in order to bring new music to Kent, and the introduction of presenter shows including links with universities and colleges in the county. The first presenter-based shows were launched in January 2011, along with a new logo for the station.

The station was closed on 25 June 2012 and replaced with a relay of the now-countywide KMFM. The digital variant has its own countywide advertisements, but uses the KMFM Medway studio number.

The "KMFM Extra" name was revived for the new evening show with Oli Kemp on KMFM that began broadcasting in January 2013.

== Programming ==
Weekday breakfast ("The Hangover") and drivetime programmes were live and presenter based. Other shows included a showbiz-based show on weekend mornings, Dance Anthems on Friday evenings and "The Takeover", where various celebrities took over the playlist for three hours on weekend afternoons. At all other times programming consisted of non-stop music.

The station's playlist was that of contemporary hit music, and dance/R&B, as a contrast with that of the seven local KMFM stations. This format has now been applied to the KMFM network as a whole.

== Past presenters ==
- Dave "Davey B" Bethall
- Nicola Fletcher
- Claire Gregory
- Toby Mackenzie
- Rob Wills
