= Becky Ives =

British sports broadcaster

- Born: Rebecca Ives
- Education: Woodhouse Grove School; University of Teesside; Italia Conti Academy of Theatre Arts
- Occupations: Journalist, television presenter, radio presenter

Becky Ives is a British radio and television presenter, with specialism in sports presenting.

== Career ==
Working in radio, she was breakfast show and drive time presenter at Heart Kent, presenting alongside James Heming and working at the station from December 2014 until May 2019 when the station ceased all local programming.

Working in sports, Ives had early jobs working online for ESPN, Bleacher Report, and Red Bull TV. Working in football, Ives presented BT Sport Score, as well as covering the National League for the BT Sport. Ives has also presented for Premier League Productions on Premier League Today, and was part of the ITV Sport coverage of the FA Cup Final in 2024, as well as presenting live events for UEFA. Ives has also hosted live SPFL games for Rangers FC on RTV. From 2026, Ives has presented on The Overlap alongside Steven Gerrard.

Ives has worked as a sports presenter for TNT Sports, covering sports such as boxing and cricket, including the 2025-26 Ashes series, as well as the 2026 Commonwealth Games, with her presenting described as "excellent" in The Daily Telegraph.

== Personal life ==
Ives attended Woodhouse Grove School in Yorkshire, before attending the University of Teesside and the Italia Conti Academy of Theatre Arts in London.
