= Tom Lowe (radio) =

Thomas Edward Lowe (born 21 August 1975 in Bexley, London) is a radio broadcaster in the United Kingdom. Tom currently presents on BBC Radio Gloucestershire.

Tom started working for radio stations operating under a restricted service licence (RSL), including Thanet Local Radio (now KMFM Thanet), which was based in Ramsgate, Kent.

In 1998, Tom joined the team at European Klassik Rock, a Pan-European satellite radio station broadcasting via the Astra 1C satellite from The Maidstone Studios in Kent, and presented the Friday evening show. Tom then presented on Radio Caroline, also at the time on Astra 1C and from The Maidstone Studios, in 1999, with a Saturday evening show that was also simulcast on 88.4FM The Breeze to the French and Italian Rivieras. He also appeared on WBCQ in America under the Radio Caroline banner with a pre recorded programme in 2000.

In the summer of 2001, Tom was heard presenting on 107.7 WFM in Weston-super-Mare (now Star 107.7).

Tom joined Star 107.5 in Cheltenham, in 2001 (broadcasting then as 107.5 Cat FM), presenting the weekday drivetime show. In addition, he also presented the Saturday breakfast show. In late 2003, Tom briefly took over the mid morning show for a year but, in late 2004, he returned to the drivetime show. During this time Tom also presented a weekday evening show on Star 107.7 and various shows on Star 107.9.

Tom presented on BBC Radio Gloucestershire on Saturdays until December 2011.
