= Paddy Bunce =

British radio personality

Paddy Bunce is a sports radio reporter in the United Kingdom. He has worked at a number of radio stations across the U.K.

== Career ==
He began his career working on Capital Gold Sport as a football reporter and presenter and has also worked at Invicta FM in Kent as a presenter and at Radio Aire in Yorkshire. Before this Paddy had a variety of jobs, including serving in the army, working as a bricklayer, fitting double glazing.

Notably he was once the sports presenter on the Johnny Vaughan Breakfast Show on London's 95.8 Capital FM. He could also be heard daily on Xfm London, Capital Gold London, Choice FM London and less regularly on various radio stations across England.

Paddy writes a column for Sport magazine about television sports coverage.

== World record ==
He is the current Guinness world record holder for the most consecutive passes with a giant volleyball. The record is 582 and was set on the roof of Capital Radio's London studios in November 2006.
