= KMFM West Kent =

English radio station

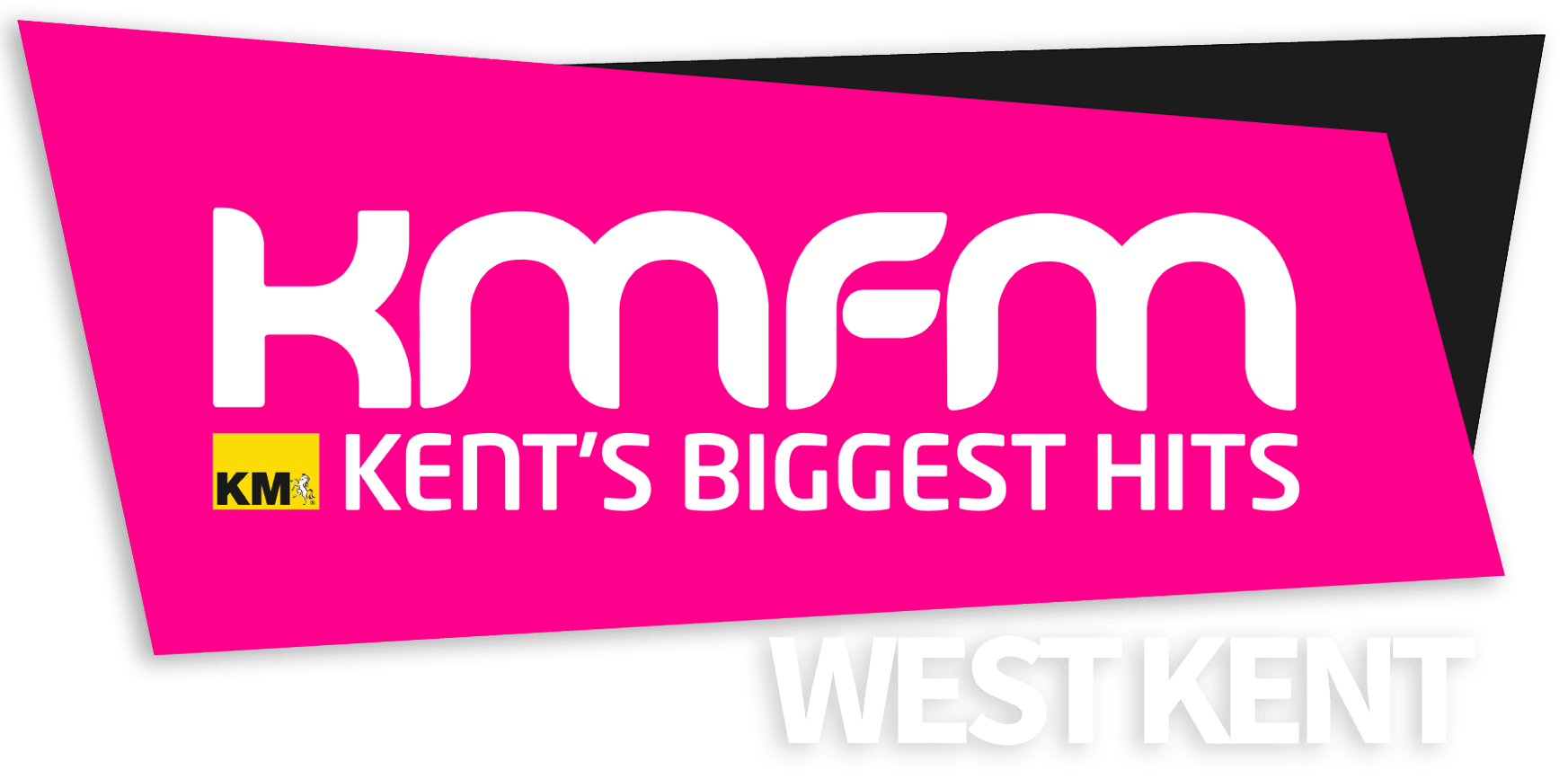

Strood; England
- Broadcast area: West Kent
- Frequencies: FM: 96.2 MHz (Royal Tunbridge Wells and Tonbridge); 101.6 MHz (Sevenoaks and Southend)
- RDS: KMFM

Programming
- Format: Contemporary hit radio
- Network: KMFM

Ownership
- Owner: KM Group

History
- First air date: 8 July 1995
- Former names: KFM (1995–2000); Mercury FM (2000–2002)

Links
- Website: www.kmfm.co.uk

KMFM West Kent is an Independent Local Radio serving the towns of Sevenoaks, Tonbridge and Royal Tunbridge Wells plus the surrounding areas of the South East of England. It is the West Kent region of the KMFM radio network (owned by the KM Group), containing local advertisements and sponsorships for the area amongst a countywide schedule of programming.

== History ==
KMFM West Kent launched on 8 July 1995 as KFM, broadcasting on 96.2 and later that year also on 101.6 FM. It was owned by Kent and Sussex Radio. As well as West Kent, the station also included parts of East Sussex, such as Crowborough, in its broadcast area. The station was later purchased by DMG Radio and subsequently re-branded to Mercury FM in December 1999. A year later DMG sold their radio assets to GWR who, in 2002, sold the station to the KM Group following a readvertising of the licence. The station was re-branded to KMFM West Kent in September that year.

The station moved its studios and presenters, along with those of KMFM Maidstone, to the KMFM Medway studios in 2008, following Ofcom approval. The sales team are still based at the KM office in Tonbridge.

The KM Group were awarded a four-year extension of the licence, to 7 July 2015, in March 2010.

Like the rest of the KMFM network. the station was relaunched in September 2010 with new jingles, schedule changes and more emphasis on music.

The KMFM network switched to a contemporary hit radio format in 2012 following the merging of KMFM Extra with KMFM. The music now focuses mainly on Top 40 hits, and contains a lot more dance and R&B than before.

== Programming ==
All programming across the KMFM network is now shared across all seven stations following OFCOM approval in February 2012. The local breakfast show, by then the only local show on the station, was replaced by a county-wide show on 12 March 2012.

Until 2007, KMFM West Kent produced its own programmes during daytimes, before it joined up with KMFM Maidstone to network all programmes other than breakfast. The stations joined with KMFM Medway to create a West Kent network in April 2009, before all programmes apart from weekday/Saturday breakfast and Sunday afternoons were networked across all KMFM stations in September 2009. In July 2010, Saturday breakfast and Sunday afternoons became networked.

The breakfast show for Maidstone was merged with that of West Kent in January 2011.

News bulletins come from the KMFM News Centre in the Medway studios. National news bulletins come from Sky News Radio at times. Traffic and travel updates are broadcast.

== Presenters ==
=== Former presenters ===
- Tony Blackburn
- Johnny Lewis
- Dave Pearce
- Myma Seldon
- Benedict Smith
- Melanie Sykes
