= Benedict Smith =

Benedict Smith is a disc jockey who presented The Saturday Show on the KMFM network and breakfast on KMFM Maidstone and KMFM West Kent before being made redundant in March 2012 following the arrival of the county-wide KMFM networked breakfast show. He formerly presented The Big Drive Home on Hertbeat FM every weekday between 4-8pm before it became a franchise of Jack FM. Before that he did mid-mornings at Q103 and weekend breakfast at Kent's Invicta FM).

Through the years he has freelanced for numerous Global Radio stations such as Heart Cambridgeshire.
