= Honest Doubt =

- Genre: Theology/ Philosophy
- Running time: 4 hours 15 minutes
- Country of origin: United Kingdom
- Language: English
- Home station: Original Production
- Hosted by: Richard Holloway
- Produced by: Olivia Landsberg / Ladbroke Productions
- Original release: 28 May – 22 June 2012
- Website: http://www.spokenworldaudio.com/honestdoubt.html

Honest Doubt: The History of an Epic Struggle is a series of twenty 15-minute radio essays by the author and former Bishop of Edinburgh, Richard Holloway. It was originally broadcast on BBC Radio 4 between 28 May and 22 June 2012, rebroadcast as four 1-hour omnibus editions on Friday evenings throughout June 2012. The series was written and presented by Richard Holloway, and produced by Olivia Landsberg at Ladbroke Productions.

== Synopsis ==
In "Honest Doubt", Richard Holloway explores the relationship between faith and doubt over the last 3000 years. Using Gauguin's painting Where Do We Come From? What Are We? Where Are We Going? as his starting point, he looks at how some of humanity's best thinkers and most creative writers have approached these 'literally life and death questions'. The series takes us from the birth of religious thinking, through the Old Testament and New Testament, the Middle Ages, the Protestant Reformation, the Age of Enlightenment, the Victorian era, the horrors of World War II, right up to today.

As the former head of the Scottish Episcopal Church, Richard Holloway's main focus is on the history of doubt in the Judeo-Christian tradition. But as he says, he is 'first and foremost a human being', and so he also considers some of the universal questions about our existence and the meaning of life. "Think of a piece of music", he says. "If faith is the melody, doubt is the descant. Each adds texture and depth to the other, and if we're lucky, a sense of harmony."

== Episode guide ==
- 1 Prologue - an introduction to the series.
- 2 In the Beginning - looks at the birth of religious thinking and one of religion's earliest doubters.
- 3 Casting Out Idols - considers one of the recurring themes in Judeo-Christianity - idolatry.
- 4 Revelation and its Limits - looks at one of the recurring issues in the story of doubt - God's invisibility.
- 5 Mysteries not Problems - reflects on the work of the mediaeval mystics.
- 6 Breaking Up - explores the role of doubt during the Reformation in the 16th Century.
- 7 The Agony and the Ecstasy - looks at the doubts of three priest poets - John Donne, John Bunyan and Gerard Manley Hopkins.
- 8 Vacating Heaven - considers the influence of the Scientific Revolution.
- 9 Paying the Price - looks at censorship and excommunication.
- 10 Caught in the Middle - explores the theme of Free Will.
- 11 Embracing Uncertainty - charts the impact of John Keats and Percy Bysshe Shelley.
- 12 Believer's Doubt - considers the doubts of 4 Victorian poets: Cardinal John Henry Newman, Arthur Hugh Clough, Matthew Arnold and Robert Browning
- 13 A Post Mortem - explores the impact of Charles Darwin, Charles Lyell and the 19th-century fashion for historical criticism of the Bible.
- 14 God's Funeral - brings together the 19th century English writer Thomas Hardy and the 19th century German philosopher Friedrich Nietzsche who represented for many the culmination of the Victorian crisis of faith.
- 15 Godless Morality - uses Fyodor Dostoyevsky and Friedrich Nietzsche to explore the future of morality without God.
- 16 On the Edge - uses the American poet Emily Dickinson, Ludwig Wittgenstein, Richard Dawkins and philosopher Roger Scruton to explore the mystery of existence.
- 17 Saving Doubt - explores doubt and disloyalty with the help of three great 20th-century writers – James Joyce, Evelyn Waugh and Graham Greene.
- 18 Darkness Made Visible - draws on 18th-century Scotsman David Hume and the Holocaust literature of Paul Celan and Andre Schwarz-Bart to explore: how can we reconcile the idea of God when there's so much suffering in the world?
- 19 Presence and Absence - considers the dilemma through three post-war poets; Philip Larkin, John Betjeman and RS Thomas.
- 20 Tears in the Rain - offers a conclusion.

== Contributors ==
- Karen Armstrong - Episode(s): 3,4,5,6, 13
- Prof. Harvey Cox - Episode(s) 3, 4
- Prof. Don Cupitt - Episode(s): 2, 20
- Prof. Richard Dawkins - Episode: 16
- Dr. Jennifer Michael Hecht - Episode(s): 2, 4
- Prof. Carole Hillenbrand - Episode: 5
- Prof. Susan James - Episode(s): 8,9
- Prof. Christopher Janaway - Episode(s): 10,14,15
- The Revd. Prof. David Jasper - Episode(s): 1,5,12,17,18
- Prof. Sir Anthony Kenny - Episode(s): 3,8,12,16
- Prof. Norman Kreitman - Episode(s): 2, 15
- Prof. Peter Millican - Episode(s): 8, 18
- Sir Andrew Motion - Episode(s): 7, 11, 9, 20
- Adam Phillips - Episode: 20
- Prof. Roger Scruton - Episode: 16
- Prof. George Steiner - Episode: 1
- Prof Geza Vermes - Episode: 4

== Music ==
The opening, closing and incidental music was composed by Seb Juviler at SNK Studios.
