= Johnny Lewis (DJ) =

- Born: 25 December 1958 (age 67); Ipswich, Suffolk, England
- Presenting career
- Style: Disc Jockey
- Country: England

Johnny Lewis (born 25 December 1958) is a DJ who has broadcast on Radio Caroline and the KMFM stations.

== Early years ==
Lewis was born in Ipswich, Suffolk. He came to the Radio Caroline ship in 1977 to fix a generator. Due to seasickness by another presenter, he was asked to step in and began his career in broadcasting.

== Career ==
Also worked in 1980 after the Mi Amigo sank on the Voice of Peace off Tel Aviv http://www.offshore-radio.de/VOP.htm Then from 1981 moving to Eire to work on a number of stations including Sunshine Radio and Radio Nova in Dublin, and Corks South Coast Radio.

Back to sea in the mid 80s to help in the set up of Laser 730 later Laser 558. Before joining ILR station for Hereford and Worcester Radio Wyvern in 1987

Lewis was programme controller of Kent-based station Invicta FM from 1992 to 1993 and also presented on the station. Since 1997 he has been broadcasting on the KMFM network, based at the Thanet studio, and was one of the first presenters on what was then TLR 107.2. He presented weekday breakfast on KMFM Thanet until being made redundant in March 2012 following the arrival of a networked breakfast show. He also formerly presented Saturday breakfast on KMFM Shepway and White Cliffs Country), and a networked show, "The Vinyl Years", on Sunday evenings across all seven KMFM stations until September 2010.
