= KMTV (Kent) =

Local television channel in Kent, United Kingdom

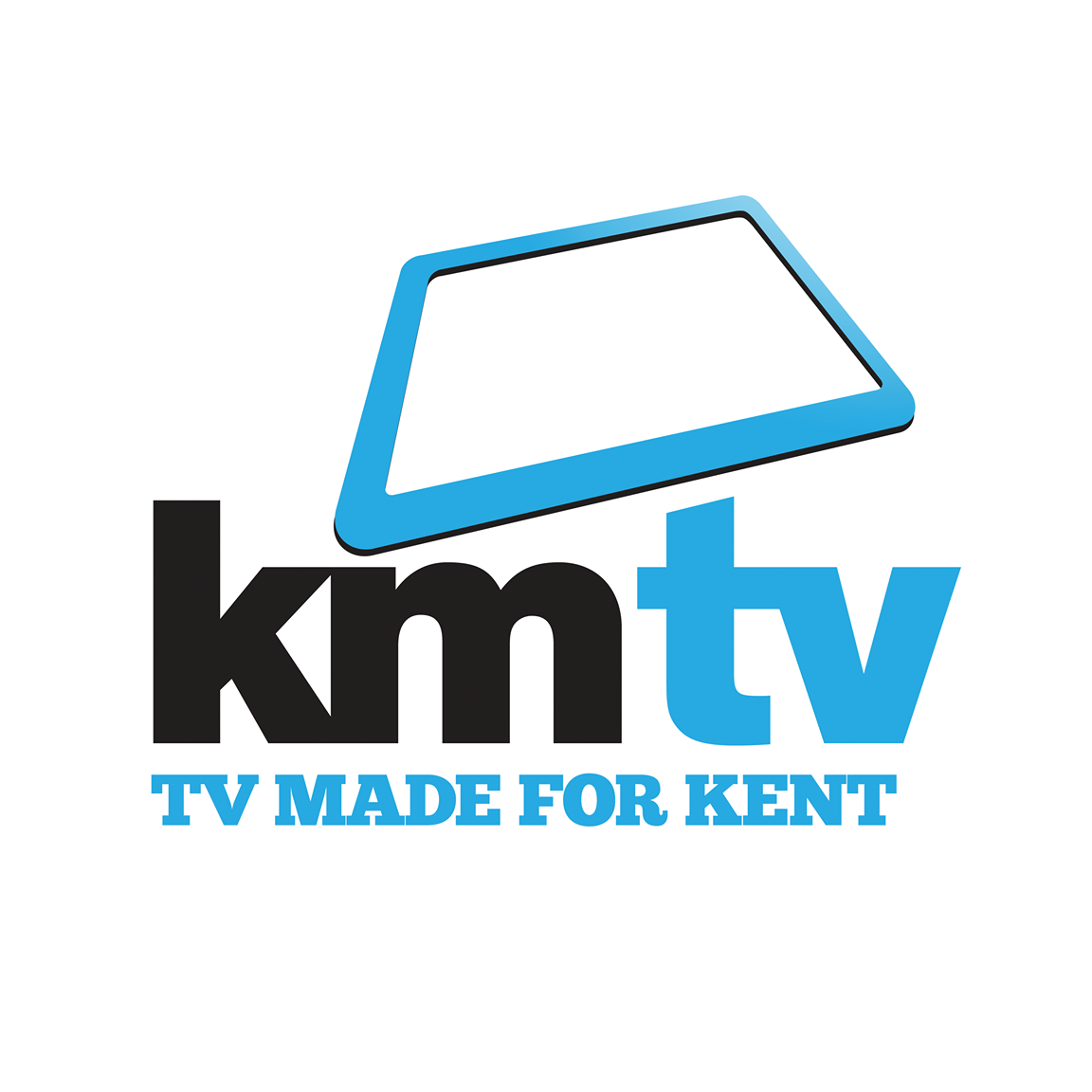
- Logo used since 2017
- Country: United Kingdom
- Broadcast area: Kent

Programming
- Language: English

Ownership
- Owner: KM Media Group

History
- Launched: 10 July 2017; 8 years ago

Links
- Website: kmtv.co.uk

Availability

Terrestrial
- Freeview: Channel 7
- Virgin Media: 159

KMTV is the local television service for Kent, England, owned by the KM Media Group. The station is jointly operated with the University of Kent and is available to viewers in the Bluebell Hill and Tunbridge Wells transmitters.

== History ==
On 30 July 2014, KMTV was awarded a licence to operate in Kent county out of Maidstone, with plans to start broadcasting by 2015, covering 175,000 households in the county alone. The licence was jointly bid by the KM Media Group and the University of Kent, who pooled their resources.

The channel launched on 10 July 2017 at 5:30pm on Freeview and Virgin Media with the inaugural edition of Kent Tonight. The station broadcasts from a purpose-built studio at the university's Medway Campus.

In August 2021, a new programme, Critical Law TV, was announced. KMTV became one of the first Medway businesses to benefit from a DCMS investment programme, alongside Palladian Media, in the summer of 2023. October 2023 saw Generation Why, a series about religion-related issues aimed at school-age students, funded by the British Film Institute.

Kent University suffered a funding crisis in early 2024, damaging its co-operation with KMTV. In January 2025, Hadlow College was featured as part of a feature on a Kent Tonight special on the future of farming.
