= Sanjhi Awaz Radio =

Programming
- Format: Asian

Ownership
- Owner: 9 Media

History
- First air date: 15 April 2010
- Last air date: 30 August 2012

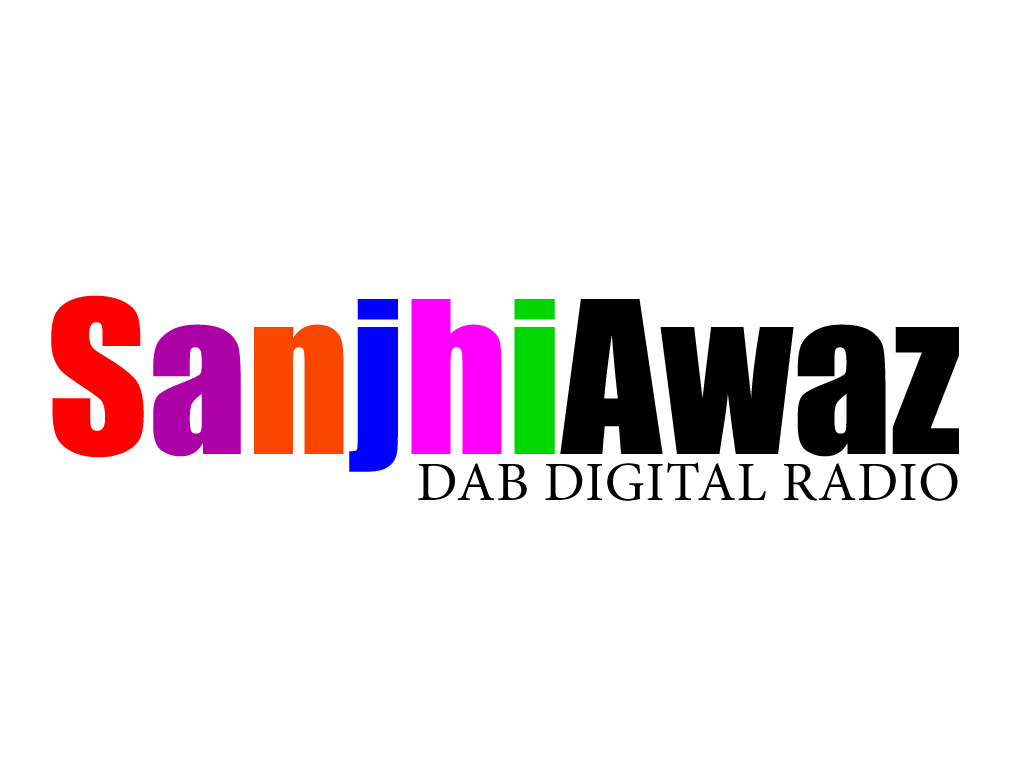

Sanjhi Awaz Radio was an Asian radio station broadcasting on DAB digital radio across the West Midlands area of England, including Birmingham, Coventry, Wolverhampton, Leamington Spa and Walsall. The station broadcast in Punjabi, Hindi, Urdu and English in 128 kbit/s, and also streamed on the internet for Windows Media Player.

== Background ==
The station was unable to find funding needed to keep the station on air and was unable to find a buyer or investor and closed its DAB and online streams on 30 August 2012.

Sanjhi Awaz described itself as "Your Voice, Your Radio". The name of the radio station meant "shared voice" as it was broadcast in several languages.

The station manager Gulshan Dhingra, previously worked for Doordarshan and the Sunrise Radio Group.
