= KMFM Maidstone =

Coordinates: 51°23′25″N 0°30′52″E

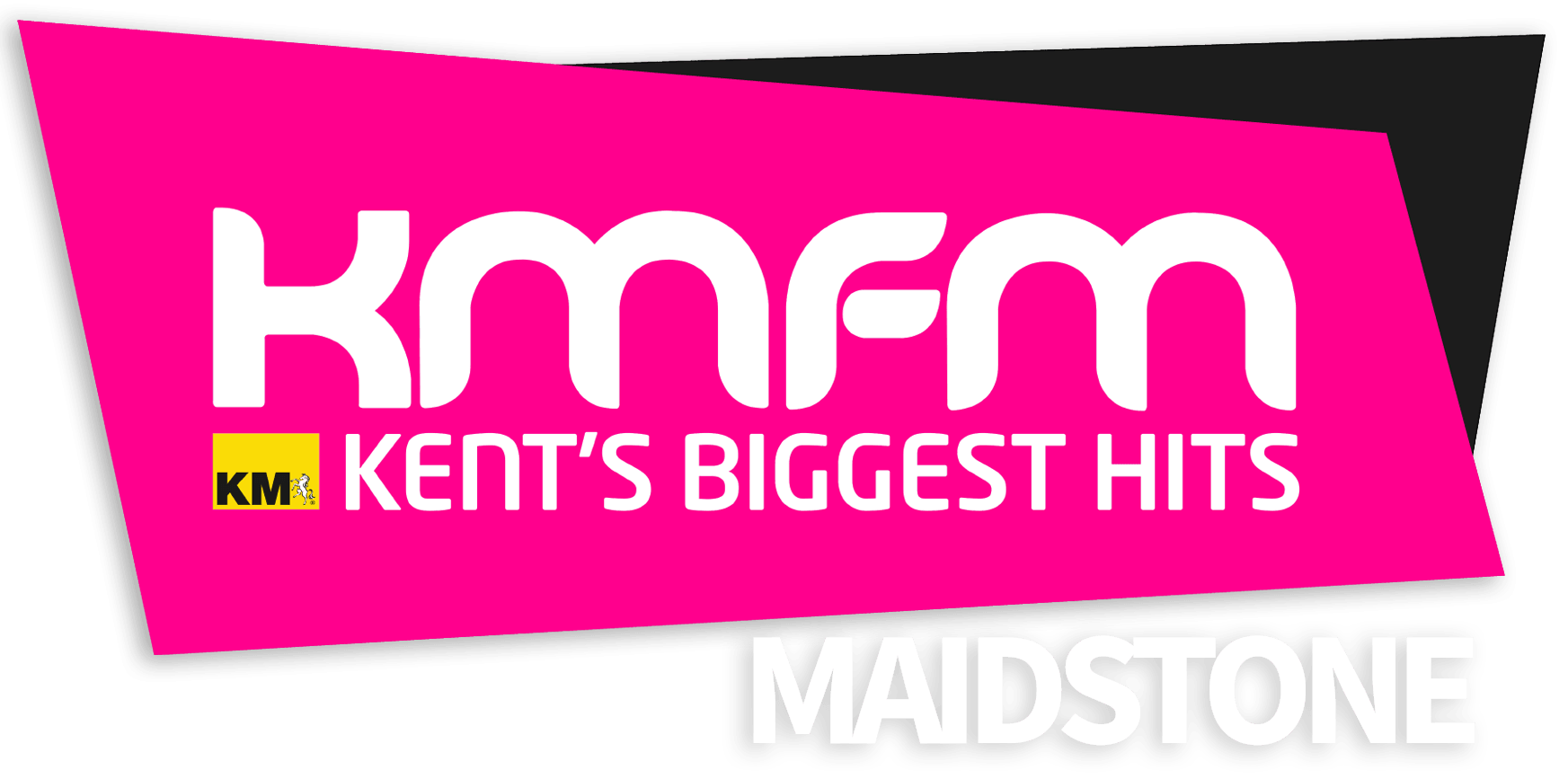
- England
- Broadcast area: Maidstone, West Malling and Mid Kent
- Frequency: FM: 105.6 MHz
- RDS: __KMFM__

Programming
- Format: Contemporary hit radio
- Network: KMFM

Ownership
- Owner: KM Group

History
- First air date: 18 October 2003
- Former names: CTR (until 2007)

Links
- Website: www.kmfm.co.uk

KMFM Maidstone is an Independent Local Radio serving the town of Maidstone and the surrounding areas in Kent, South East England. It is the Maidstone region of the KMFM radio network (owned by the KM Group), containing local advertisements and sponsorships for the area amongst a countywide schedule of programming.

== History ==
The station began life as a public broadcast of Maidstone Hospital Radio, operated in the early 1990s under a restricted service licence. Timed to coincide with the town's annual river festival, the service was known as Maidstone Festival Radio. Following a disagreement with the NHS Trust that operated the hospital radio station, Maidstone Festival Radio set up their own studio before later changing the station's name to CTR FM (County Town Radio). At the request of the Radio Authority, it was rebranded a second time to 20/20fm (after the A20 and M20 trunk roads that run through the area), following concerns that the station could be confused with the similarly named 106CTFM which had just launched a full-time service in Canterbury.

Six applications were filed for a new Maidstone and Mid-Kent licence by January 2003, with the winning application being declared as Maidstone Radio Ltd (20/20fm) in the spring. The station launched full-time on 18 October 2003, reverting to CTR 105.6 (the Canterbury station having by then rebranded as KMFM Canterbury), under the directorship of former TLR 107.2 programme controller Jon Maxfield and many former KM Radio employees. Mike Russell was the first voice on air in 2003; the first song to be played was "Start Me Up" by the Rolling Stones. CTR's launch line-up featured many of the members of the original RSLs.

The station was sold to the KM Group in November 2006 and then rebranded as KMFM Maidstone on 12 September 2007. The station moved its studios and presenters, along with those of KMFM West Kent, to the KMFM Medway studios in 2008, following Ofcom approval. The sales team are still based at the KM office in Maidstone.

The licence was extended for another four years in April 2010, taking it to 17 October 2015.

Like the rest of the KMFM network, the station was relaunched in September 2010 with new jingles, schedule changes and more emphasis on music.

The KMFM network switched to a contemporary hit radio format in 2012 following the merging of KMFM Extra with KMFM. The music now focuses mainly on Top 40 hits, and contains a lot more dance and R&B than before.

The station originally transmitted from a site at Coxheath to the south of Maidstone. This was moved to Bluebell Hill to the north of the town on 28 July 2025.

== Programming ==
All programming across the KMFM network is now shared across all seven stations following OFCOM approval in February 2012. The local breakfast show, by then the only local show on the station, was replaced by a county-wide show on 12 March 2012.

Until 2007, KMFM Maidstone produced its own programmes during daytimes, before it joined up with KMFM West Kent to network all programmes other than breakfast. The stations joined with KMFM Medway to create a West Kent network in April 2009, before all programmes apart from weekday/Saturday breakfast and Sunday afternoons were networked across all KMFM stations in September 2009. In July 2010, Saturday breakfast and Sunday afternoons became networked.

The breakfast show for Maidstone was merged with that of West Kent in January 2011.

News bulletins come from the KMFM News Centre in the Medway studios on the hour from 6am - 6pm on weekdays, and 8am - 1pm on weekends. National news bulletins come from Sky News Radio outside these times. Traffic and travel updates are broadcast just before the hour, and every 20 minutes between 7am - 9am and 4pm - 7pm.
