= KMFM Shepway and White Cliffs Country =

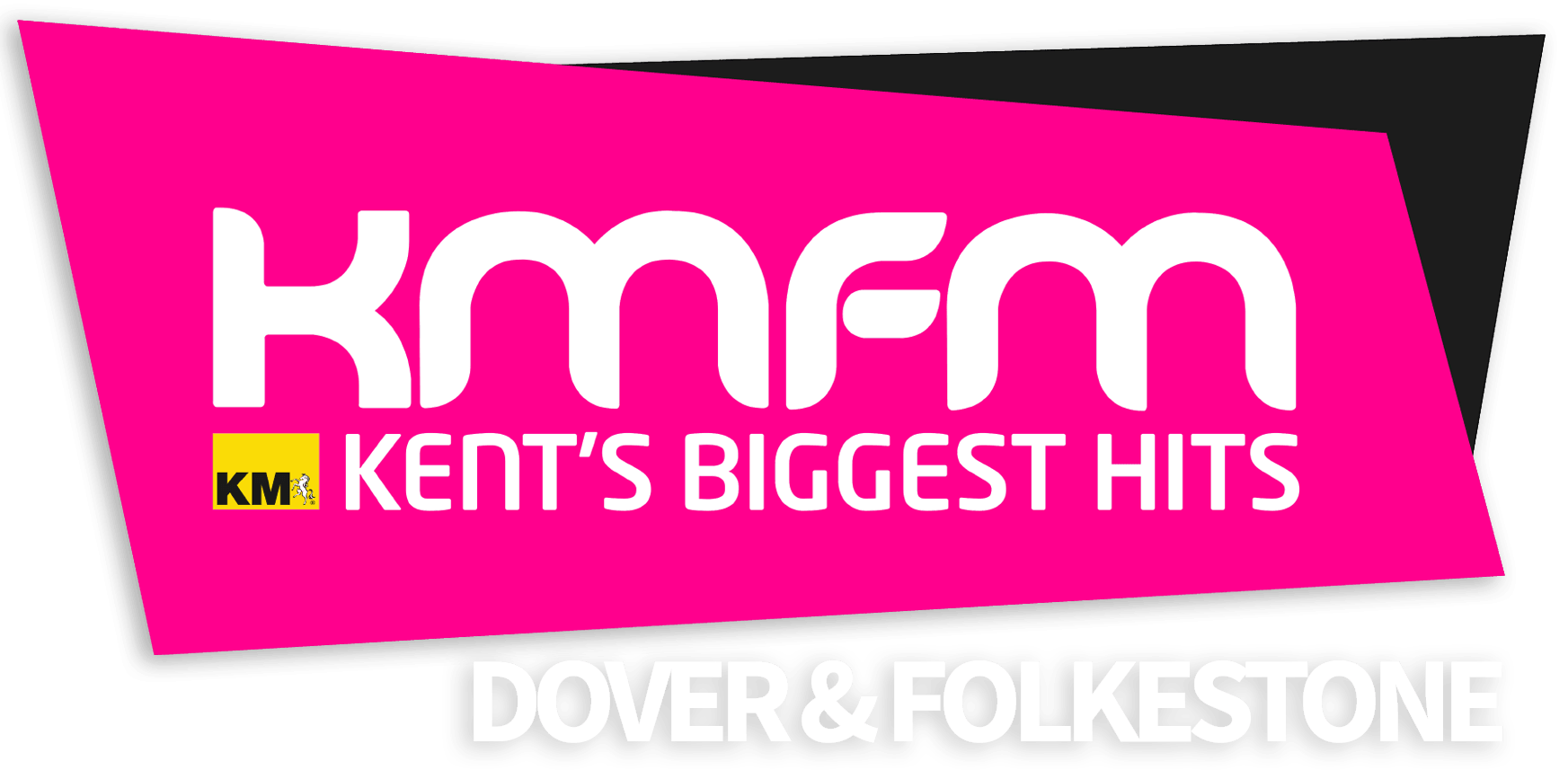

England
- Broadcast area: Folkestone, Hythe, Dover, Deal
- Frequencies: FM: 96.4 MHz (Folkestone and Hythe); 106.8 MHz (Dover)
- RDS: __KMFM__

Programming
- Format: Contemporary hit radio
- Network: KMFM

Ownership
- Owner: KM Group

History
- First air date: 29 September 1997
- Former names: Neptune Radio (until 2003)

Links
- Website: www.kmfm.co.uk

KMFM Shepway and White Cliffs Country is an Independent Local Radio station serving the districts of Dover and Folkestone and Hythe (previously known as Shepway) and the surrounding areas in Kent, South East England. It is the South Kent region of the KMFM radio network (owned by the KM Group), containing local advertisements and sponsorships for the area amongst a countywide schedule of programming.

The station has been referred to by many names. Its official name is "KMFM Shepway and White Cliffs Country", however the website previously described it as "KMFM Dover and Folkestone", and on air it was referred to as "Shepway's KMFM".

== History ==
KMFM Shepway and White Cliffs Country launched on 29 September 1997 as Neptune Radio, broadcasting on 96.4 and 106.8 FM after a month-long trial concluded earlier that same morning.

The station's roots extend to the 1970s, where it began as pirate radio station Channel Radio, which only broadcast in the Dover area. Run by Dover native Eddie Austin, who previously worked at Radio Caroline, the station was fined numerous times, but Austin maintained it until the town received its own radio licence.

The station emerged as a combination of two stations broadcasting through the 1990s – "Shepway Sound" in Folkestone (broadcasting November–December 1993, and August 1994), and "White Cliffs Sound" in Dover (broadcasting May 1994 and August 1995). Austin and his group, South East Radio, applied for the licences for Shepway and White Cliffs Country in 1996 and were awarded the licence for both areas in January 1997. The new station was rebranded as Neptune Radio due to the station's proximity to the English Channel.

The station won the UK Radio Station of the Year award twice, in 1999 and 2000, and reached approximately 30,000 listeners each week (a 24% share of the audience). After being bought by Radio Investments Ltd, its successful format was applied to its sister stations Arrow FM in Hastings and Sovereign Radio in Eastbourne. A group, spearheaded by Neptune Radio disc jockey Mark Carter, also applied for the Ashford licence under the name Ashford FM, but they did not gain the licence.

The station was purchased by the KM Group in 2001 and started programme sharing at weekends with other KM-owned stations in Kent. It was subsequently re-branded to KMFM Shepway and White Cliffs Country in 2003. The KM Group relocated the station from premises on Church Street in Dover to their Folkestone offices for the Kentish Express in Sandgate Road.

The company was reawarded the licence for the station in July 2008. In April 2009, KMFM were granted permission by Ofcom to move the studios to their building in Ashford, although the sales team remains in Folkestone. Following the arrival of the county-wide breakfast, all KMFM programming is now broadcast from Medway.

In June 2010, the Breakfast Show was presented live from the Folkestone Multi-Cultural Festival with several guests and show crew.

Like the rest of the KMFM network, the station was relaunched in September 2010 with new jingles, schedule changes and more emphasis on music.

The KMFM network switched to a contemporary hit radio format in 2012 following the merging of KMFM Extra with KMFM. The music now focuses mainly on Top 40 hits, and contains a lot more dance and R&B than before.

== Programming ==
All programming across the KMFM network is now shared across all seven stations following OFCOM approval in February 2012. The local breakfast show, by then the only local show on the station, was replaced by a county-wide show on 12 March 2012.

Until 2007 KMFM Shepway and White Cliffs Country produced its own programmes during daytimes, before it joined up with KMFM Ashford to network all programmes other than breakfast. The stations joined with KMFM Canterbury and KMFM Thanet to create an East Kent network in April 2009, before all programmes apart from weekday/Saturday breakfast and Sunday afternoons were networked across all KMFM stations in September 2009. In July 2010, Saturday breakfast and Sunday afternoons became networked.

News bulletins come from the KMFM News Centre in the Medway studios on the hour from 6am – 6pm on weekdays, and 8am – 1pm at weekends. National news bulletins come from Sky News Radio outside these times. Traffic and travel updates are broadcast just before the hour, and every 20 minutes between 7am – 9am and 4pm – 7pm.
