= KMFM (radio network) =

English radio station

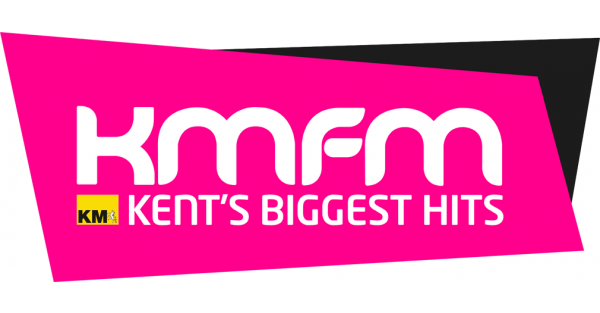
- England
- Broadcast area: Kent
- Frequencies: FM: 96.2 MHz-107.9 MHz; DAB: 11C
- RDS: __KMFM__

Programming
- Language: English
- Format: CHR

Ownership
- Owner: KM Media Group

Links
- Webcast: Listen Live; Ashford Stream; Canterbury Stream; Shepway & White Cliffs Country Stream; Maidstone Stream; Medway Stream; Thanet Stream; West Kent Stream
- Website: www.kmfm.co.uk

KMFM is a network of radio stations that was formed from the merger of seven Independent Local Radio stations and one digital station (on the Kent Digital Multiplex) owned by the KM Group, broadcasting to the county of Kent in the United Kingdom. Whilst the station broadcasts as one countywide station, it is officially eight separate licenses.

KMFM offers its listeners local news and music. KMFM plays a mix of music, mainly covering the current Top 40 hits after adopting a contemporary hit radio format in 2012. The previous KMFM format had been aimed at an older audience.

As of March 2024, the network broadcasts to a combined audience of 187,000, according to RAJAR.

As of 2026, the current weekday breakfast show hosts are Rob and Numi, who host the slot 6:30am- 10am.

== Original stations ==
When the original stations were rebranded, KMFM operated each of the seven stations locally on FM throughout Kent, with one county-wide station on DAB on the NOW Kent multiplex. Apart from KMFM Ashford, each station was previously independent before being bought by the KM Group and rebranded.

Station	Former name(s)	First air date	Frequency(ies)	Broadcast areas
KMFM Ashford	LARK FM (only used in trial broadcasts)	3 October 2005	107.6 FM	Ashford, Romney Marsh and Tenterden
KMFM Canterbury	106 CTFM	21 September 1997	106.0 FM	Canterbury, Herne Bay and Whitstable
KMFM Maidstone	CTR-FM	18 October 2003	105.6 FM	Maidstone, West Malling and Mid Kent
KMFM Medway	Medway FM; Mercury FM	September 1997	100.4 FM / 107.9 FM	Chatham, Gillingham and Rochester
KMFM Shepway and White Cliffs Country	Neptune Radio	29 September 1997	96.4 FM / 106.8 FM	Deal, Dover, Folkestone and Hythe
KMFM Thanet	TLR	17 January 1998	107.2 FM	Broadstairs, Margate, Ramsgate and Sandwich
KMFM West Kent	KFM; Mercury FM	8 July 1995	96.2 FM / 101.6 FM	Dartford, Gravesend, Sevenoaks, Tonbridge and Tunbridge Wells
KMFM	KMFM Extra; km-d; KM Digital	1 May 2004	NOW Kent DAB 11C	Countywide

== Programming ==
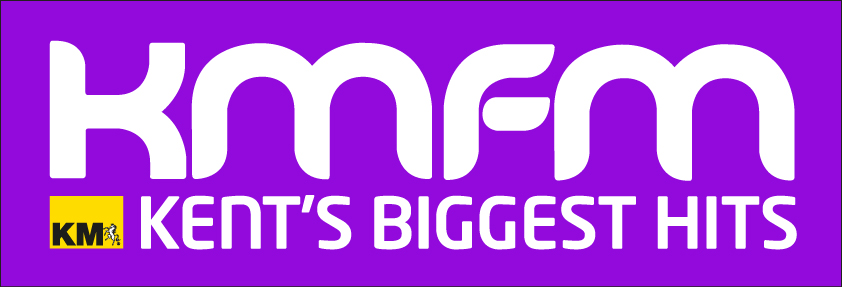

All KMFM stations adopted a common programming in March 2012. The previous local breakfast DJs had been made redundant following the close of their breakfast shows the previous Friday, and all other shows presented by them were also removed from the network.

KMFM Extra, until then a separate station with a unique schedule, was closed down in June 2012 and replaced on DAB with the regular KMFM service. Each area however still offers local advertisements and sponsorships (in the case of the DAB and online services, countywide adverts are heard).

Originally each station produced its own programming during daytime. Apart from Medway, from 2007 each station grouped with its neighbour (West Kent and Maidstone; Canterbury and Thanet; Ashford and Shepway and White Cliffs Country) to network programmes between 11am and 7pm. The programmes were merged in April 2009 to create two groups with their own networked programming – West (Maidstone, Medway and West Kent) and East (Ashford, Canterbury, Shepway and White Cliffs Country and Thanet). At other times (evenings and weekends) programming was broadcast across all seven stations.

In September 2009, KMFM was given permission to network all its programmes apart from Monday to Saturday breakfast, and Sunday afternoons. Saturday breakfast and Sunday afternoons were networked in 2010. Breakfast shows for KMFM Maidstone and KMFM West Kent were merged in January 2011.

== Digital ==
The initial DAB digital radio offering from KMFM was km-d (renamed KMFM Digital a year later), which initially followed a similar adult-contemporary format to the FM stations in the KMFM network, which at that time continued to offer some separate superlocal programming, and so were unable to broadcast county-wide on the Capital Digital (later NOWdigital)-operated Kent multiplex.

In 2008 KMFM's digital capacity was relaunched as fresh contemporary hits station KMFM Extra, with the FM stations continuing as before. Dedicated presented programmes for Extra were introduced from January 2011. On 25 June 2012 KMFM Extra closed as a discrete station and was replaced on DAB by a relay of the KMFM network programming feed, by now also going out on all the FM stations in the network.

In October 2026 KMFM launched a listener poll through their website to gauge response to four potential new spin-off station formats which were under consideration, but with no guarantee that the polling would lead to any of the formats definitively launching as a station). The four formats put to the public in the poll were a fresh contemporary hits concept (dubbed 'Kent's All New Music'), likely to be similar to the 2008-12 KMFM Extra format; a dance music station ('Kent's Dance Anthems'), a rock music station ('Kent's Biggest Rock'), and a classic hits concept ('Kent's All Time Hits'), the launch of which would split KMFM into contemporary and classic pop stations in much the same way the birth of Coast AM from Invicta Radio's AM frequency had done in 1989.

== Studios ==
Originally all seven stations broadcast from studios within their transmission area. KMFM Canterbury moved to the Ashford studio in 2008, and KMFM Shepway and White Cliffs Country joined it in April 2009. KMFM Thanet broadcast from Cliftonville near Margate (having been relocated from Margate harbour). All three stations in the west network broadcast from Medway. Each station has however retained its sales teams within the transmission area.

Since the merger of all stations, all programmes are produced and broadcast from the Medway studios. The Ashford and Cliftonville studios have been closed.

== News service ==
Initially, each station provided an independent service during peak hours from their respective newsrooms.

Local bulletins have since been superseded by a county-wide bulletin. This system operates from 6am until 6pm on weekdays and 8am until 1pm on weekends; outside of those hours, KMFM's off-peak news service is provided by Sky News Radio. News bulletins are provided on the hour from the Medway studios; previously the Canterbury studio had been the news hub until this closed in 2009.

Bulletins were also provided at 7.30am, 8.30am, 4.30pm and 5.30pm on weekdays. The half-past bulletins started in September 2006 to replace extended news bulletins at the top of the hour. This ended in autumn 2011 before being restarted in mid-2012.
