= KM Media Group =

English multimedia company

- Industry: Media
- Founded: 1890
- Headquarters: Medway, Kent, England
- Number of locations: See "Offices", below
- Area served: Kent
- Key people: Edward Iliffe
- Products: Newspapers, Radio Stations, Broadcasting, Websites
- Parent: Iliffe Media Ltd
- Divisions: KMFM; KMTV
- Website: www.kmmediagroup.co.uk

KM Media Group is a multimedia company in the county of Kent, England which originated as the publisher of the Kent Messenger. The Group now produces local newspapers, radio stations, TV and websites throughout the county. Iliffe Media acquired KM Media Group in April 2017.

== History ==
KM Media Group initially started in 1859, when the Maidstone Telegraph (now the Kent Messenger) was first published in Kent's county town of Maidstone. The newspaper was taken over by Barham Pratt Boorman in 1890, after its owners, the Masters brothers, were jailed and forced to sell up. Boorman had already started his own newspapers in Ashford.

Barham was succeeded by his son, Henry Pratt Boorman, in the late 1920s. He realised that people would be keen to buy the paper if it included their picture or pictures of their own towns and villages. Henry's son Edwin joined the firm in the late 1950s and was managing director from 1962 until 1986. That was when his father stepped down as chairman and became President of what had developed into the Kent Messenger Group. Edwin took the chair and remained at the helm until the end of 2005 when he was succeeded by his oldest daughter, Geraldine Allinson.

== Cancelled acquisition of further titles ==
In July 2011, it was announced Northcliffe Media intended to sell nine of its titles to KM Media Group. The newspapers involved included the Dover Express, East Kent Gazette, Folkestone Herald, Herne Bay and Whitstable Times, Isle of Thanet Gazette, Medway News and Thanet Times. km Media Group referred the acquisition to the Office of Fair Trading.

The Office of Fair Trading then referred the matter to the Competition Commission, because of the possible monopoly it might create. This meant the cost of the deal and process of takeover would have increased.

Due to this interest by the Office of Fair Trading and Competition Commission, the take-over of the papers was scrapped. Since then several of the affected newspapers closed including the Medway News and Isle of Thanet Gazette.

== Acquisition ==
Iliffe Media Ltd acquired the entire shareholding of KM Media Group in April 2017.

== Newspapers ==
=== Paid-for newspapers ===
KM Media Group operates a number of weekly newspapers for different parts of Kent which have been acquired over the years.

- Kent Messenger, with three editions
  - Maidstone
  - Malling
  - Weald
- Dartford Messenger
- Gravesend Messenger
- Medway Messenger
- Faversham News
- Sheerness Times Guardian
- Sittingbourne Messenger
- Sittingbourne News Extra
- Kentish Gazette (Canterbury)
- Whitstable Gazette
- Herne Bay Gazette
- East Kent Mercury (Deal and Sandwich)
- Dover Mercury
- Folkestone & Hythe Express
- Kentish Express, with three editions
  - Ashford
  - Hythe and Romney Marsh
  - Tenterden

Apart from the Medway Messenger, which is published twice-weekly on Monday and Thursday all titles are published weekly. Also published is Kent Business, a monthly publication which has been going since 1993.

=== Free newspapers ===
In 1981 KM Media Group launched its Extra series, beginning with the Thanet Extra. There are currently 4 Extra newspapers around the county that are distributed through letterboxes and available at pick-up points.

== Radio ==
KM Media Group owns and operates seven commercial FM radio stations in Kent. Six of them were previously independent stations, acquired by the Group between 1999 and 2006 and collectively rebranded KMFM. The programming is networked across the stations, however, there is also unique content on each station including; what's on, local advertisements and sponsorship and when relevant other content e.g. traffic reports and school closures. The network also includes a DAB station.

== Internet ==
KM Media Group's main consumer website is KentOnline.co.uk, launched in 1998. The website offers local news, travel, jobs, motors, holidays and other features.

== Television ==
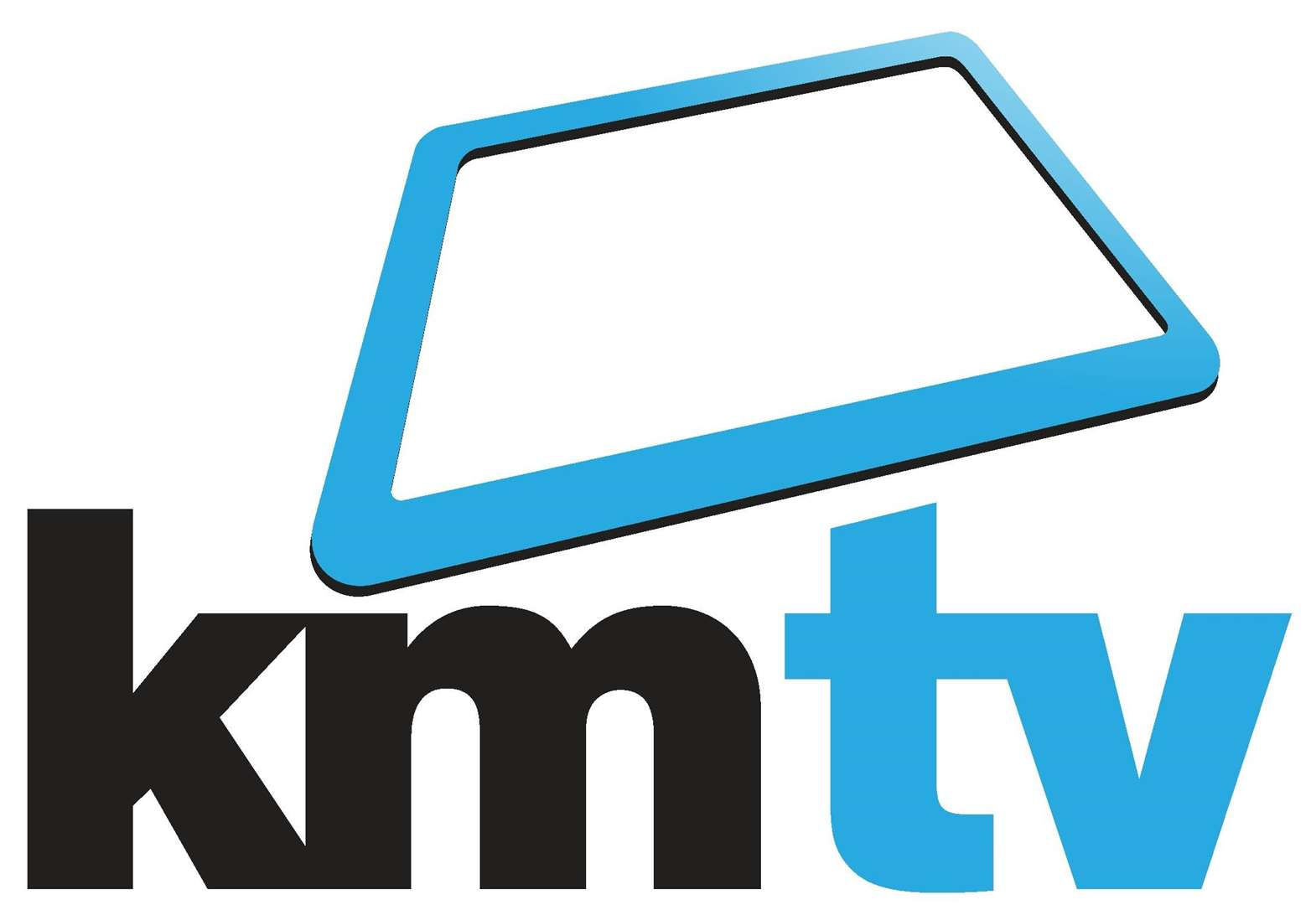
KMTV

In 2017, KM Media Group launched KMTV in partnership with the University of Kent. KMTV is Kent's only dedicated TV channel, broadcasting a range of current affairs and news programming, including its week-nightly news show, Kent Tonight. It is part of the Local Television Network and regulated by Ofcom.

== Offices ==
KM Media Group has offices in Ashford, Canterbury, Deal, Gravesend, Maidstone, Medway, Ramsgate and Sheerness. It previously had offices in Dover, Faversham, Sittingbourne and Tunbridge Wells (which were closed in 2008); Folkestone (which closed in April 2009); and London (which closed in 2011).
