= 2011 in British radio =

This is a list of events in British radio during 2011.

== Events ==
=== January ===
- 1 January – Gem 106 replaces Heart 106.
- 2 January – BBC Radio 4's soap The Archers celebrates its 60th anniversary on air.
- 3 January – 95.8 Capital FM London launches nationally and becomes a part of The Capital FM Network as part of a merger of Global Radio's Hit Music and Galaxy networks to form the nine-station 'Capital Network'. Other than daily breakfast and weekday drivetime shows, the majority of Capital's London-based output will be networked.
- 4 January – Simon Bates joins Smooth Radio to become its new national breakfast presenter.
- 11 January – KMFM West Kent and KMFM Maidstone merge their breakfast shows, meaning all programming is shared across both stations.
- 12 January – Presenter Pat Sharp is appointed as Smooth Radio's Weekend Breakfast presenter with immediate effect. He had been presenting the show since December 2010, having taken over from Graham Dene who had been standing in since Tony Blackburn's departure in October.
- 13 January – Sam Orford debuts on Seahaven FM.
- 17 January – Vanessa Feltz joins Radio 2, taking over Sarah Kennedy's old early morning show.
- 25 January – The BBC World Service is to close five of its language services with the loss of 650 jobs.
- 28 January – Sir Elton John apologises after using the F word during an appearance on the Chris Evans Breakfast Show.
- 31 January – BBC Radio 2 announces the cancellation of its annual Electric Proms season after five years, citing financial considerations.

=== February ===
- 1 February – It is reported that Jo Whiley will leave BBC Radio 1 after 17 years in April to move to Radio 2, where she will present an evening show from Mondays to Wednesdays, replacing The Radcliffe and Maconie Show. Radcliffe and Maconie will, in turn, move to 6 Music while Whiley's Radio 1 show will be taken over by Huw Stephens.
- 7 February – London dubstep, grime, and house music pirate station Rinse FM commences legal broadcasting with a Community radio license.
- 8 February – Richard Keys and Andy Gray, recently sacked by Sky Sports for sexist comments they made, are signed by Talksport to present a new show.

=== March ===
- 18 March – BBC Radio 1 presenter Chris Moyles breaks the record for presenting the longest radio programme, after hosting a 52-hour live broadcast in aid of Comic Relief 2011.
- 27 March
  - Emma B joins Smooth Radio to present a Sunday afternoon programme.
  - Due to budget cuts, transmission of the BBC World Service on 648 kHz MW ends. The transmissions, from the Orfordness transmitting station in Suffolk, have been on air since 1982 and had provided English-language coverage of the World Service to much of northern Europe.
- 28 March – Celador Radio files a format change request for The Coast to air classic and contemporary rock instead of adult alternative.

=== April ===
- 1 April – Comedian Rob Brydon presents Ken Bruce's Radio 2 show, impersonating the Scottish presenter throughout the two-and-a-half-hour programme as an April Fool's joke.
- 2 April – BBC Radio 7 is rebranded as BBC Radio 4 Extra.
- 2 April – Fi Glover presents her last edition of Saturday Live. Rev. Richard Coles takes over the role from the following Saturday.
- 4 April – David "Kid" Jensen joins Smooth Radio to present a weekday afternoon show.

=== May ===
- 3 May – BBC Radio 3 resumes the broadcasting of regular live concerts. This overturns the much criticised 2007 decision to replace almost all of its live broadcasts with pre-recorded concerts.
- 9 May – It is confirmed that Irish broadcaster Ryan Tubridy will join Radio 2 for eight weeks to present Graham Norton's show from 23 July while Norton is away. He returns to the network later in the year to cover for Ken Bruce over the Christmas period.

=== June ===
- 22 June – Radio 2 hosts 2DAY, a day of 12 hour-long programmes to promote some of the station's specialist output normally reserved for evenings and weekends.

=== July ===
- 21 July – The BBC confirms that Andy Parfitt will step down as Controller of Radio 1 after 13 years to pursue other opportunities from the end of the month. Parfitt will also relinquish the roles of Controller of BBC 1Xtra and the BBC Asian Network.
- 28 July – GMG Radio announces that the Manchester-based station 106.1 Rock Radio will be re-branded as 106.1 Real Radio XS, and that Glasgow-based 96.3 Rock Radio will be sold.

=== August ===
- 28 August – Alan Titchmarsh presents the final edition of Radio 2's Melodies For You. The programme – dedicated to popular classic and light music, and part of the station's schedule since the 1960s – has been scrapped as the station wishes to change its format for representing the genres.
- 31 August – Traffic Radio closes at 15:00 as the project is axed following the government spending review.
- August – The forces broadcaster BFBS ceases transmissions in Belize.

=== September ===
- 1 September – Protesters from the Palestine Solidarity Campaign disrupt a concert given by the Israel Philharmonic Orchestra for the BBC Proms at London's Royal Albert Hall.
- 5 September – Manchester station 106.1 Rock Radio is replaced by Real Radio XS.
- 11 September
  - Gary Barlow headlines Radio 2's inaugural Radio 2 Live in Hyde Park music festival in London's Hyde Park. Barlow is a last minute replacement for Lionel Richie, who was forced to cancel his appearance due to ill health.
  - On the 10th anniversary of the September 11 attacks on the United States, Smooth airs a documentary featuring British people who were living in New York City at the time of the attacks. This is followed by live coverage of the remembrance service from Ground Zero, the former site of the World Trade Center, which was destroyed in the attacks.
- September – Simon Bates presents a week of programmes from South Australia as part of a promotion in which Smooth Radio gives away a holiday to the state.

=== October ===
- 25 October – The BBC announces that, from next season, it will axe the second commentator for football matches as a cost-cutting measure.
- 28 October – Ben Cooper is appointed as Controller of Radio 1 and 1Xtra, replacing Andy Parfitt who stepped down in July.
- 31 October – The Broadcasting Standards watchdog Ofcom issues radio stations with a reminder of the rules regarding the airing of songs with expletive lyrics after several recent instances of such songs being played.

=== November ===
- 1 November –
  - GMG Radio launches a dedicated station playing nothing but Christmas music, under the brand "Smooth Christmas". The station has no news or advertisements but promotes Smooth Radio and broadcasts until 27 December 2011.
  - Broadcasters Sir Jimmy Young, Jane Garvey, Peter Allen and Andy Peebles are inducted into the Radio Academy Hall of Fame.
  - The radio industry news website Radio Today publishes a preview edition of Radio Today: The Magazine with plans to launch it as a monthly magazine from 2012. The edition is distributed to delegates at the 2011 Radio Festival.
- 7 November – The World at One on BBC Radio 4 is extended from 30 to 45 minutes.
- 22 November – Blind actor Ryan Kelly, who plays Jack 'Jazzer' McCreary in Radio 4's The Archers is the inaugural recipient of the Tyzack Award at the Ability Media International awards. The award recognises writers, producers and performers who "transcend the stereotypical".

=== December ===
- 2 December – The BBC apologises after a BBC Radio Scotland presenter is heard to swear on air during a morning news bulletin when a technical glitch led to the words "the Borders" being repeated 37 times.
- 6 December – BBC Radio Wales launches on FM across the south of the country when it begins broadcasting on 103.9 from the Wenvoe transmitting station. It replaces a much smaller transmitter at Wenallt Hill which had previously been used for BBC Radio Gwent.
- 7 December – BBC Radio 1 announces changes to its dance music schedule from April 2012. Skream & Benga, Toddla T, Charlie Sloth and Friction will take over from Judge Jules, Gilles Peterson, Kissy Sell Out and Fabio & Grooverider. This will include a shuffle of most late night shows Monday to Saturday to incorporate the new line up. A new rota of DJs for 'In New DJs We Trust' will also be announced in early 2012
- 12 December – Simon Bates takes his Smooth Radio Breakfast show to Afghanistan for a week of programmes with British troops from Camp Bastion.
- 23 December – GMG Radio confirms plans to launch a station dedicated to music from the 1970s on trial basis. Smooth 70s will replace Smooth Christmas on the Digital One platform from 27 December.

=== Undated ===
- National stations BBC Radio 5 Live, BBC Radio 5 Live Sports Extra and BBC Radio 6 Music move to MediaCityUK in Salford.

== Station debuts ==
- 1 January – Gem 106
- 31 March – Academy FM (Folkestone)
- 1 November – Smooth Christmas
- 22 November – Absolute Radio 60s
- 29 November – Absolute Radio 70s
- 27 December – Smooth 70s

== Programme debuts ==
- 4 January – Simon Bates at Breakfast on Smooth Radio (2011–2014)
- 21 February
  - Brian Gulliver's Travels on BBC Radio 4 (2011–2012)
  - The Third Degree on BBC Radio 4 (2011–Present)
- 5 April – Ambridge Extra on BBC Radio 4 Extra (2011–2013)
- 7 April – Sounds of the 20th Century on BBC Radio 2 (2011–2012)
- 11 October – The Life Scientific on BBC Radio 4 (2011–Present)
- 4 November – In and Out of the Kitchen on BBC Radio 4 (2011–2015)

== Continuing radio programmes ==
=== 1940s ===
- Sunday Half Hour (1940–2018)
- Desert Island Discs (1942–Present)
- Woman's Hour (1946–Present)
- A Book at Bedtime (1949–Present)

=== 1950s ===
- The Archers (1950–Present)
- The Today Programme (1957–Present)

=== 1960s ===
- Farming Today (1960–Present)
- In Touch (1961–Present)
- The World at One (1965–Present)
- The Official Chart (1967–Present)
- Just a Minute (1967–Present)
- The Living World (1968–Present)
- The Organist Entertains (1969–2018)

=== 1970s ===
- PM (1970–Present)
- Start the Week (1970–Present)
- You and Yours (1970–Present)
- I'm Sorry I Haven't a Clue (1972–Present)
- Good Morning Scotland (1973–Present)
- Newsbeat (1973–Present)
- File on 4 (1977–Present)
- Money Box (1977–Present)
- The News Quiz (1977–Present)
- Feedback (1979–Present)
- The Food Programme (1979–Present)
- Science in Action (1979–Present)

=== 1980s ===
- Steve Wright in the Afternoon (1981–1993, 1999–2022)
- In Business (1983–Present)
- Sounds of the 60s (1983–Present)
- Loose Ends (1986–Present)

=== 1990s ===
- The Moral Maze (1990–Present)
- Essential Selection (1991–Present)
- Essential Mix (1993–Present)
- Up All Night (1994–Present)
- Wake Up to Money (1994–Present)
- Private Passions (1995–Present)
- The David Jacobs Collection (1996–2013)
- Sunday Night at 10 (1998–2013)
- In Our Time (1998–Present)
- Material World (1998–Present)
- Scott Mills (1998–2022)
- The Now Show (1998–Present)

=== 2000s ===
- BBC Radio 2 Folk Awards (2000–Present)
- Big John @ Breakfast (2000–Present)
- Sounds of the 70s (2000–2008, 2009–Present)
- Kermode and Mayo's Film Review (2001–2022)
- A Kist o Wurds (2002–Present)
- Fighting Talk (2003–Present)
- Jeremy Vine (2003–Present)
- The Chris Moyles Show (2004–2012)
- Annie Mac (2004–2021)
- Fearne Cotton (2009–2015)
- Elaine Paige on Sunday (2004–Present)
- The Bottom Line (2006–Present)
- The Christian O'Connell Breakfast Show (2006–Present)
- The Unbelievable Truth (2006–Present)
- The Radcliffe and Maconie Show/Radcliffe & Maconie (2007–Present)
- Geoff Lloyd's Hometime Show (2008–2017)
- The Strand (2008–2013)
- The Media Show (2008–Present)
- Newsjack (2009–Present)
- Paul O'Grady on the Wireless (2009–2022)
- Alan and Mel's Summer Escape (2009–2020)

=== 2010s ===
- Weekend Wogan (2010–2015)
- The Chris Evans Breakfast Show (2010–2018)
- Graham Norton (2010–2020)
- Simon Mayo Drivetime (2010–2018)

== Ending this year ==
- 27 March – The Jo Whiley Show (2001–2011)
- 1 April – The Big Toe Radio Show (2002–2011)
- 11 September – Americana (2009–2011)

== Closing this year ==
Date	Station	Debut
17 February	Perth FM (Perth)	
27 March	BBC 648	1987
31 August	Traffic Radio	
27 December	Smooth Christmas	2011

== Deaths ==
- 10 February – Trevor Bailey, 87, cricket commentator, previously cricketer
- 11 February – Sam Plank, 62, broadcaster
- 15 March – Keith Fordyce, 82, radio and television presenter
- 23 April – James Casey, 88, variety artist and radio comedy scriptwriter and producer
- May – Norman Thomas, 63, broadcaster
- 12 August – Robert Robinson, 83, presenter
- 29 October – Jimmy Savile, 84, disc jockey, television presenter, media personality, charity fundraiser and serial sex offender
