= Jealous of the Angels =

2012 song by Jenn Bostic

"Jealous of the Angels" is a 2011 song by the American country music and Christian music singer-songwriter Jenn Bostic. It was co-written and composed by Jenn Bostic with Barrett Yeretsian, Zachary Runquist and Jimmy Fortune. It first appeared on her extended-play Change, and later in her album, Jealous. The album was released in the United Kingdom and Ireland in September 2012, and the song "Jealous of the Angels" was released as her debut single in the UK on December 17, 2012. The song reached number one on the UK singer-songwriter charts. It reached number one on the UK iTunes Music Charts. The song won Bostic five awards at the 2012 Independent Country Music Association Awards; for Overall Winner, for Best Female Country Artist, Best Musician, Best Songwriter and for Country Music Song of the Year.

== Context ==
The song is inspired by her father James Regan Bostic, and is a tribute to him. James Bostic was a musician, who was killed in a motoring accident when Jenn was ten, an event which had a huge impact on Bostic's decision to become a musician. "The first time I sat down at the piano after the accident, I shut my eyes and honestly felt my dad's presence next to me. I poured my heart into those first few songs. The only way I could connect with him was when I played music. I still feel that way."

== Popularity and fame ==
"Jealous of the Angels" – a song inspired by her father – became popular in the UK after it was played by broadcaster Simon Bates on his Simon Bates at Breakfast show on Smooth Radio as part of the Our Tune strand on May 14, 2012, that had featured a story about loss. The song was quickly picked among the station's Top 10 Most Played for the week, and went on to receive over two million views on YouTube. It was also picked up by other UK radio networks, including BBC Radio 2, where Terry Wogan featured it on his Sunday morning Weekend Wogan show. It was also added to the BBC Radio 1 playlist.

== Music video ==
Bostic released a sentimental music video of the song on her YouTube channel. Most of the video displays Bostic singing and playing the song on her piano. At the beginning, she browses the family photo album and memorabilia by taking a duplicate copy of a picture with her. Later at a coffee shop, she buys coffee and writes a letter to her late father. The video finishes with her visiting her father's grave, setting down a bouquet of flowers and the letter addressed to "Dad" with the final shot of the tombstone that says: "BOSTIC, JAMES REGAN, May 18, 1940 – Feb 16, 1996".

== Covers ==
The song has been subject of a number of covers including that by the Celtic singer and musician Donna Taggart in 2014 accompanied by a music video She performed it live on The Late Late Show on the Irish television station RTÉ One in October 2016 and during The Irish Post Country Music Awards in September 2018..

The song was also covered by the British-Irish country singer Nathan Carter who included his own version of the song in his 2017 album Livin' the Dream

In 2018 Katherine Jenkins included a version in her album Guiding Light released on November 30, 2018. It was accompanied by a music video on her YouTube channel. She also released another music video footage of the song with accompaniment by the Grief Encounter Children's Choir. Jenkins is a patron of that children's bereavement charity. Young Australian country music artist Keely Johnson included a recording of "Jealous Of The Angels" on her debut album Fierce in February 2019. An official music video was also released in late 2018.
