= Donna Taggart =

Northern Irish musician (born 1985)

- Born: Donna Taggart; 24 August 1985 (age 40)
- Occupations: Singer; musician
- Instrument: Vocals
- Years active: 2011–present
- Website: donnataggart.com

Donna Taggart (born 24 August 1985) is a Northern Irish Celtic singer and musician. She is best known for her 2016 track "Jealous of the Angels".

Born in Clanabogan and educated at the University of Liverpool, she was very shy growing up, and spent many years working with children with additional challenges. She first performed aged 22 at the funeral of her best friend's sister; her debut album, Celtic Lady Vol. 1, attracted attention after being played by Gerry Anderson. In 2016, her cover version of Jenn Bostic's "Jealous of the Angels" went viral on Facebook, prompting her second album Celtic Lady Vol. 2 to top the Billboard World Albums chart and enter the Scottish Albums Chart at No. 97. In 2019, the song re-entered the charts, peaking on the UK Singles Downloads Chart at No. 85 after being referenced on the cooking competition Great British Menu. The following year, Taggart and other Irish celebrities filmed videos for her former employer Western Health and Social Care Trust encouraging viewers to stay at home. She is married to Colm McGaughey, who managed Augher St Macartan's GAC, and has three surviving children.

== Life and career ==
=== Early life and Celtic Lady ===
Taggart was born on 24 August 1985 in Clanabogan, and is the eldest of five girls. Both her parents were singers; her father, Mark Taggart, was also a tradesman and builder. To pay for college, she worked as a cleaner at Omagh County Hospital, where she met future Augher St Macartan's GAC manager Colm McGaughey, who at the time was working at the hospital in IT; they married in 2011. Taggart later attended the University of Liverpool, studying early years in education. After graduating, she spent five years working with children who had suffered from domestic violence before becoming the co-ordinator of services for a refuge in Omagh. She also worked at the Health Service Executive in its children's autism team, where she specialised in behavioural support and direct intervention with children and families.

Taggart's first public solo performance was at 22, as she had been very shy growing up, and was at the funeral of her best friend's sister, who had been involved in a bus crash in Spain and had died of a thrombus after returning home; her performance consisted of several hymns. She released her debut album, Celtic Lady Vol. 1, in 2011; the album attracted attention after being played by the BBC Radio Ulster presenter Gerry Anderson, and contained the single "Bright Blue Rose" and a cover of Phil Coulter's "The Town I Loved So Well". She also released the album Celtic Lady Vol. 2 in 2013, which she promoted on Irish television shows. On Mother's Day in 2015, Taggart released the single "Mom", which charted at No. 1 in the iTunes UK and Ireland Easy Listening Chart.

=== "Jealous of the Angels" ===
In 2014, Taggart was in a shop in Omagh, when she heard the opening bars of Jenn Bostic's "Jealous of the Angels" playing, and stopped dead to listen to it; finding something special about it, she played the song to her husband when she returned, who encouraged her to cover the song on the grounds that it suited her voice. Bostic had previously written the song following the death of her father while driving her to school. Taggart's cover was eventually released in August 2016, while Taggart was on maternity leave, as a double A-side with a cover of Foy Vance's "Guiding Light". A music video was released for the song on YouTube, but later went viral after being uploaded to Facebook on 9 August 2016. The following month, the success of the song caused Celtic Lady Vol. 2 to top the Billboard World Albums chart and chart at No. 97 on the Scottish Albums Chart. By February 2017, the video had 80,000,000 views on Facebook; Taggart later used a December 2016 BBC article to attribute the success of the song to its universal topic matter. She later performed the track with Bostic at National Concert Hall in February 2017, and was subsequently invited to perform the track at that year's Peace Officers Memorial Day, though a family event precluded her appearance.

On 9 May 2019, the chef Alex Greene appeared as a contestant on that year's Great British Menu, a British cooking competition for which that year's prize was to cook at a banquet celebrating music of the United Kingdom. He cooked his main course with thematic reference to "Jealous of the Angels", which he had heard in the car on the way back from visiting his recently deceased brother in hospital and which was played on the programme. He went through to that week's final, broadcast the following day, but did not make it through to the final. The following week, the song charted at No. 85 on the UK Singles Downloads Chart. In December 2020, Belfast Live reported that Taggart, Jamie-Lee O'Donnell, Cathal McShane, and Tommy Bowe had filmed video messages for Western Health and Social Care Trust (for whom Taggart had previously worked as a child services co-ordinator) as part of the Department of Health's "Fight Back NI" COVID-19 pandemic social media campaign, which aimed "to reinforce the message to the NI public that they should stay home, wash hands frequently and keep your distance".

== Artistry and personal life ==
James Christopher Monger of AllMusic wrote that Taggart purveyed "comforting interpretations of classic Celtic ballads and country-folk songs". In a November 2016 interview with the Irish Examiner, Taggart cited Mary Black, Eva Cassidy, and Alison Krauss as influences. Taggart and McGaughey have a daughter born in November 2013, a son born in late 2015, and another son born in January 2019. A further son, due in December 2014, was miscarried the previous August, and Donna used a February 2017 interview with the Belfast Telegraph to credit her faith and a miscarriage storyline on Coronation Street involving Steve and Michelle McDonald for helping her get through this period.
