= Fearne Cotton (radio show) =

- Genre: Music and entertainment
- Running time: Weekdays 10:00–12:45, Bank Holidays 10.00–13.00
- Country of origin: United Kingdom
- Language: English
- Home station: BBC Radio 1
- Hosted by: Fearne Cotton
- Recording studio: Broadcasting House, London
- Original release: 21 September 2009 – 22 May 2015
- Audio format: FM, Digital radio and online

Fearne Cotton is a British weekday radio show on BBC Radio 1, hosted by Fearne Cotton. The programme was on air from 21 September 2009 until 22 May 2015, when Cotton left the station. It was broadcast each morning from 10:00 a.m. to 12:45 p.m., and on Bank Holidays from 10:00 a.m. to 1:00 p.m. The show focused on playing and interviewing new bands and styles of music.

== History ==
On 21 September 2009, Fearne Cotton succeeded Jo Whiley for the 10:00 a.m. to 12:45 p.m. weekday slot following a major re-shuffle of Radio 1's schedules. The re-shuffle also saw Edith Bowman replaced with Greg James in the 1:00 p.m. to 4:00 p.m. weekday slot, as Jo and Edith both move to weekends. The first song she played was "Beat It" by Fall Out Boy.

On 12 August 2011 a special show was broadcast from Boardmasters Festival in Newquay.

In May 2012 the show won the Gold Award for Best Music Programme at the Sony Radio Academy Awards in London.

In August 2012, following the news that Cotton was pregnant with her first child, it was reported that Sara Cox, Gemma Cairney, Huw Stephens, Jameela Jamil, Alice Levine, and Annie Mac would cover hosting of the show throughout the duration of Cotton's maternity leave. Cotton commenced her leave on New Year's Day 2013, and then Cotton returned from her maternity leave in September 2013.

Fearne announced she is leaving the show and BBC Radio 1 on 22 May 2015 and the last song she played was "Video Games" by Lana Del Rey, Clara Amfo replaced her.

== Format ==
The show ran for two and three quarter hours every week day. News and sport were featured at 10:30am and 11:30am and on bank holidays at 10:30, 11:30 and 12:30. The show also featured the entertainment news with Chris Smith, Matt Edmondson, or Natalie Jamieson at 12:15pm.

=== Features ===
There were numerous features on the show.

- Live Lounge - Inherited from The Jo Whiley Show - Artists came into the studio to perform music from their new album/single as well as performing a cover version of a song they particularly admire, giving their own take on it. Selected guests included, Goldfrapp who performed "Fly Me Away" and the Ordinary Boys' "Boys Will Be Boys" and Nelly Furtado who sang "Maneater" and covered Gnarls Barkley's "Crazy". Several compilation albums of such covered music have been released. Other Radio 1 shows often use the Live Lounge or play songs recording during this feature.
- Changing Tracks - Daily feature - This is when a listener would email in and ask for a song that reminded them of a time in their life when music changed everything, particularly if that had had a great experience or whether a song provided some kind of comfort after a traumatic time. This feature was similar to former BBC Radio 1 DJ Simon Bates's Our Tune.
- Pet Sound - Daily feature - A song considered by Fearne to be something that we need to hear. It usually had not been released or was due to be released in due time. This song would be played once on the show for the week and it changed every week.
- I Have Never... - An occasional feature where Fearne embarked on something she had never done in her life. Listeners were also challenged to the same thing, examples including not watching television for a whole week and trying a sport for the very first time.
- What Rocked? What Sucked? - This feature involved listeners e-mailing or texting the show to tell Fearne and the listening audience what went well and what didn't. Fearne sometimes offered her own view from time to time. This feature would take place on a Friday allowing listeners to reflect upon the good and bad points of the week that had passed.
- We Love Mondays - Weekly feature - At the start of each week, Fearne would run through various reasons to be happy on a Monday morning, such as what was showing at the cinema, what music albums and singles were being released and what was coming up on television and radio.
- Ask the Experts - Weekly feature - For this feature, listeners were able to e-mail in their dilemmas or questions to a certain expert, whether it be about video games, gadgets or relationships.

== Awards ==
Year	Ceremony	Award	Result
2012	Sony Radio Academy Awards	Best Music Programme	Gold
