= House of Cards (Lynsey de Paul song) =

1972 song by Lynsey de Paul and Barry Blue

"House of Cards" is a song written by Lynsey de Paul and Barry Blue and is one of their most covered songs. It was first released as a single by Chris Kelly (who went on to become the lead singer for Blackwater Junction and then became "Hollywood" with his wife Lynda Clarke) on the CBS label on 7 April 1972, credited as being written by Rubin (de Paul) and Green (Blue). The song was a radio hit in Italy, receiving multiple plays on national radio stations.

A few weeks later a second version of the song was also released as a single by the UK artist Heart, produced by Phil Swern and Johnny Arthey on RCA. The UK born but New Zealand based singer, Rob Guest, also released his version of "House of Cards" as his first solo single on Polydor in 1972. It also appeared as the lead track on Guest's album Sing. The song was also covered by the BBC Radio 1 DJ Tony Blackburn and appeared as a track on the self-named album released in 1972 on RCA which received favourable reviews. Blackburn performed his version of the song on the ITV prime time programme 2G's & The Pop People on 17 June 1972. When reviewing the single released by "Heart" in Disc and Music Echo, John Peel wrote ""This sounds very much like Tony Blackburn singing under a pseudonym and if so puts me in a certain amount of difficulty". It was released for the first time on CD in 2012 on the Tony Blackburn compilation album The Singles Collection 1965-1980.

In 1975, the Australian singer/pianist composer, John Christie, released a more uptempo, rockier version of the song, in contrast to the previous versions all of which had been ballads. Christie's version was produced by his mentor Dave Clark, as a single on Polydor. This version reached No. 15 on the Hessen chart, securing it a listing on the Hessen chart's year end listing. Christie and Clark went on to co-write “Time,” for the musical of the same name and performed by Freddie Mercury. The song was also recorded by Gil Montana and featured as the B-side to his soul single "I Can't Live In The Dark Anymore", produced by Blue and arranged by Graham Preskett.

Barry Blue recorded the song with new lyrics and the title "Billy", which was released as a single on 4 February 1977 in the UK on the Private Stock Records label and credited to Blue, de Paul and Stephen Worth. It was also released in Germany on EMI Electrola, and in France on Sonopresse. Promotion for the single included a full page featured in the industry magazine Music Week, together with the lyrics to the song. The track appeared on CD for the first time on Blue's Singles Collection compilation album released in 2002.

According to the CD information booklet that was part of the Lynsey de Paul 2013 CD anthology release, Sugar and Beyond: Anthology 1972-1974, her version of the song was originally recorded in 1972 as a demo for possible inclusion on her debut album, Surprise, but it was not included. Thus the de Paul version had its first official release on Sugar and Beyond: Anthology 1972-1974. However, a live version of "House of Cards", along with "Sugar Me" by de Paul, as well as an interview with her, was released on the BBC Transcription Services album, issued to radio stations around the world in September 1972.
