= Jenn Bostic =

American singer-songwriter

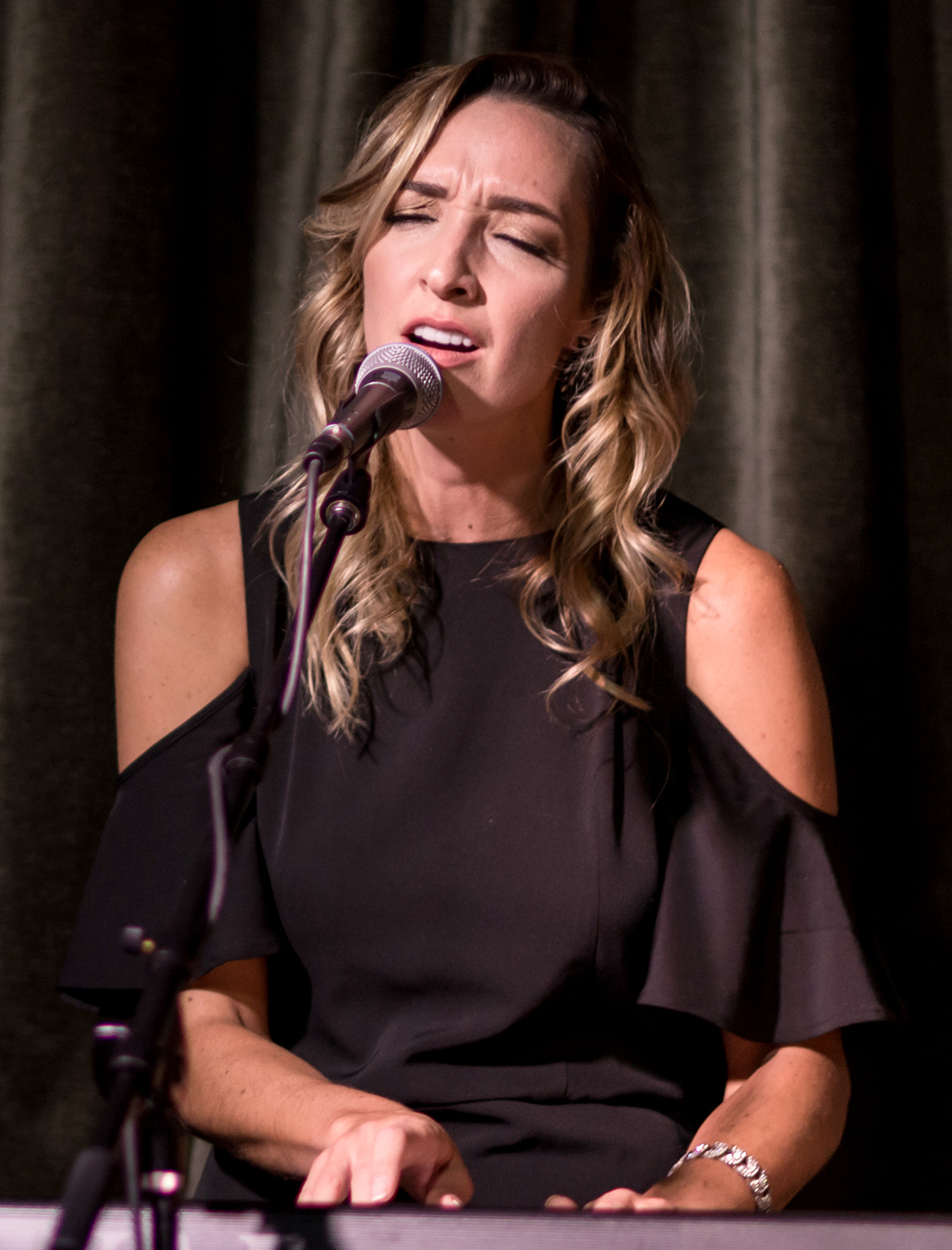
- Bostic in 2017

Background information
- Born: Jennifer Christiana Bostic; January 3, 1986 (age 40); Philadelphia, Pennsylvania, United States
- Genres: Country, pop, CCM
- Occupation: Singer-songwriter
- Instruments: Vocals, keyboards
- Years active: 2009–present
- Website: jennbostic.com

Jennifer Christiana Bostic (born January 3, 1986) is an American country music and Christian music singer-songwriter, based in Nashville, Tennessee.

In 2012, her song "Jealous of the Angels" was released. Her album, Jealous, was released in the United Kingdom and Ireland in September 2012, and her song "Jealous of the Angels" was released as her debut single in the UK in December. The song reached number one on the UK singer-songwriter charts.

== Early life and education ==
Born in Philadelphia, Bostic was raised in Waconia, Minnesota. Her father, a musician, James Regan Bostic, was killed in a motoring accident when she was ten, an event which had a huge impact on her decision to become a musician. "The first time I sat down at the piano after the accident, I shut my eyes and honestly felt my dad's presence next to me. I poured my heart into those first few songs. The only way I could connect with him was when I played music. I still feel that way." Her mother is Barbara Ann Williams Bostic, and the brother is Jeffrey James Bostic.

After graduating from high school, she went on to study music education at the Berklee College of Music in Boston, Massachusetts.

== Career ==
After college, she moved to Nashville to begin her career, becoming a regular performer and participating in writers' rounds. However, many of Nashville's record labels were unreceptive to her musical style, which has been described by South Carolina's The Anderson Independent-Mail as "too pop for country and too country for pop". She has also toured the U.S., playing at venues across the country, including the Rockwood Music Hall, in New York City; and the Hotel Café in Los Angeles, California.

Bostic worked with writer and producer Barrett Yeretsian – whose credits include the 2010 Christina Perri song "Jar of Hearts" – on her first album Jealous, released in 2012. Her song, "Jealous of the Angels", which first appeared on her extended-play album Change, garnered Bostic five awards at the 2012 Independent Country Music Association Awards; for Overall Winner, Best Female Country Artist, Best Musician, Best Songwriter and Country Music Song of the Year.

"Jealous of the Angels" – a song inspired by her father – became popular in the UK after it was played by broadcaster Simon Bates on his Simon Bates at Breakfast show on Smooth Radio as part of the Our Tune strand on May 14, 2012, that had featured a story about loss. The song was quickly among the station's Top 10 Most Played for the week, and went on to receive over two million views on YouTube. It was also picked up by other UK radio networks, including BBC Radio 2, where Terry Wogan featured it on his Sunday morning Weekend Wogan show. It was also added to the BBC Radio 1 playlist.

Much like "Jealous of the Angels", her song "Not Yet" received a popularity boost, when famous League of Legends streamer and YouTuber Uberdanger began putting a troll link at the end of his videos. It claims it's going to take you to his newest creation, but instead starts playing "Not Yet" if it's not yet finished. Arguably, this made "Not Yet" her second music video to go over million views, with the most frequent comment being "Goddarn it Uberdanger, you got me again".

She appeared as a guest on Smooth Radio's Simon Bates at Breakfast on September 28, 2012, where she spoke about her inspiration for "Jealous of the Angels". Her album, Jealous was released in the UK on September 24, 2012. "Jealous of the Angels" was released as Bostic's debut single in the UK on December 17, 2012. The song reached number one on the UK ITunes Music charts.

She released her third studio album titled Faithful in 2015.

Bostic's released her album Revival in May 2018. It was recorded at the House of Blues Studios in Nashville and features artwork shot in Iceland.

On November 19, 2019, Bostic released a 6-track EP entitled "Take My Hand Part 1", which debuted at No. 11 on the iTunes Christian/Gospel chart. The music featured on the EP is from a forthcoming album she has been creating with Lauren Christy and scheduled for release in 2020. Christy is co-creator of The Matrix, and her business partners are responsible for writing and producing Avril Lavigne's debut album Let Go, which included three international number-one hits including Complicated, Sk8er Boi, and I'm With You, selling 25 million copies. Christy has written and produced hits for Jason Mraz, Christina Aguilera, Britney Spears, Enrique Iglesias, Kelly Clarkson, Dua Lipa, Katy Perry, The Struts, Bebe Rexha and many more. She is one of only seven women to ever be nominated for "Producer of the Year" at the Grammys.

== Personal life ==
Her father, James Regan Bostic was a musician. Her mother is Barbara Ann Williams Bostic, and brother is Jeffrey James Bostic. Bostic married Michael Ernst, a childhood friend, at a beach ceremony in Florida in 2011.

== Discography ==
=== Albums ===
- Keep Lookin for Love (2009)
- Jealous (2013)
- Faithful (2015)
- Revival (2018)
- You Find a Way (2022)

=== EPs ===
- Change – EP (2011)
- Take My Hand Part 1 (2019)

=== Songs ===
- "Wish I Would Have" (2009)
- "Saturday with You" (2009)
- "Never Too Late" (2009)
- "My Brother & Me" (2009)
- "Mess It Up with Love" (2009)
- "Lay It on Thick" (2009)
- "Kiss my Rainy Day Away" (2009)
- "Keep Lookin' for Love" (2009)
- "Good in Goodbye" (2009)
- "Good for Somethin'" (2009)
- "Gay or Taken" (2009)
- "Dance Like Nobody is Watching" (2009)
- "Jealous of the Angels" (2010)
- "Wait for Me" (2011)
- "Snowstorm" (2011)
- "Missin' a Man" (2011)
- "Let's Get Ahead of Ourselves" (2011)
- "Change" (2011)
- "Not Yet" (2012)
- "Sick of Love" (2012)
- "Lips on Mine" (2012)
- "Just One Day" (2012)
- "Light a Candle" (2013)
- "Give Me Back my Pride" (2013)
- "Anywhere But Here" (2013)
- "Superstar" (2013)
- "Not Yet" (Orchestral) [2014]
- "What Love Feels Like" (2014)
- "Still Breathing" (2014)
- "Shiny New Toy" (2014)
- "Little Grace" (2014)
- "Kinda Feel Like Fallin' in Love" (2014)
- "If You See Him" (2014)
- "I Will Follow" (2014)
- "I Don't Like You at All" (2015)
- "Hurting Me, Hurting You" (2015)
- "Fight for Your Life" (2015)
- "Faithful" (2015)
- "Counterfeit" (2015)
- "Cold and Frozen" (2015)
- "Chasing Rainbows" (2015)

== See also ==
- List of Berklee College of Music alumni
