= Cobra Mist =

Anglo-American experimental over-the-horizon radar station

Coordinates: 52.10393°N 1.57614°E

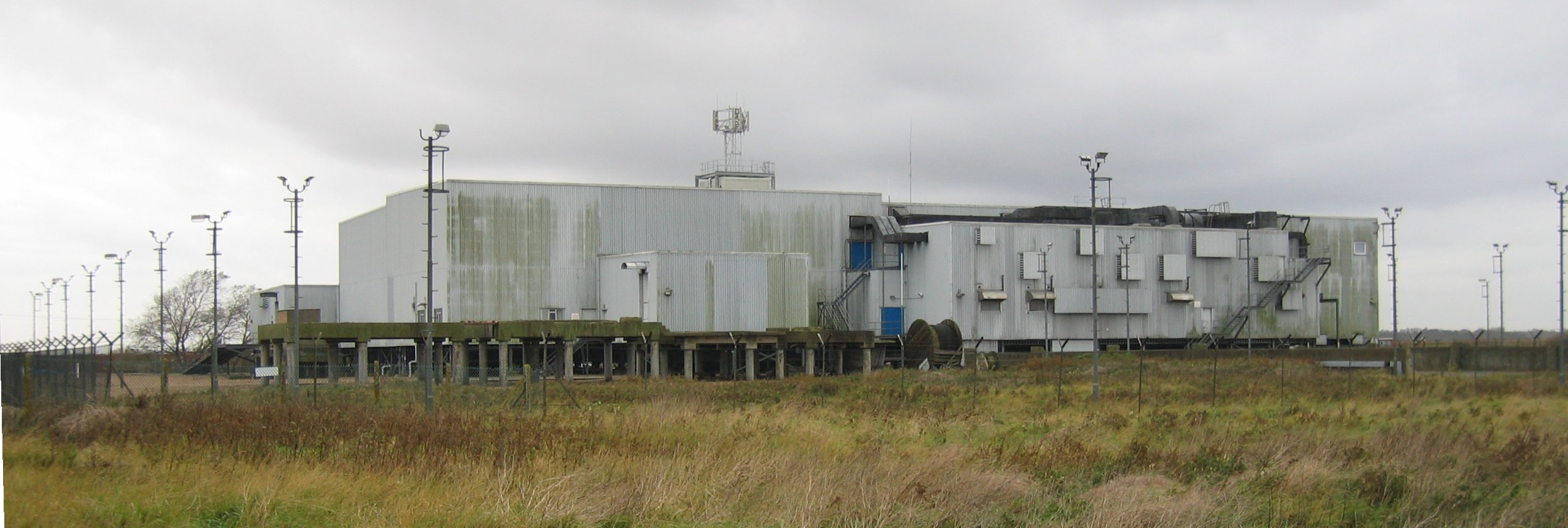
The former Cobra Mist building in October 2004

Orford Ness, Suffolk, showing locations of main sites.

Cobra Mist was the codename for an Anglo-American experimental over-the-horizon radar station at Orford Ness, England. (Note: grid reference TM450511) It was known technically as AN/FPS-95 and sometimes referred to as System 441a; a reference to the project as a whole.

Cobra Mist was part of a small number of "Cobra" long-range surveillance radars operated by the United States. It was originally intended to be located in Turkey and to offer coverage of most of European Soviet airspace. When Turkey objected to the installation, it was built in the United Kingdom in the late 1960s and into 1970 to offer a view of most of Eastern Europe. When the system was first turned on it had noise problems that could not be identified, and the project was shut down in 1973.

The site and buildings were then occupied by a radio transmitting station used mainly for the UK Foreign Office and the BBC World Service until 2011.

== Designation ==
Under the Joint Electronics Type Designation System (JETDS), all U.S. military radar and tracking systems are assigned a unique identifying alphanumeric designation. AN/FPS-95 represents the 95th design of a "Fixed, Radar, Search”.

== History ==
=== Background ===
Cobra Mist was based on the Naval Research Laboratory's experimental Magnetic-Drum Radar Equipment ('MADRE'), which was able to reliably detect aircraft at ranges up to 2,000 nautical miles (3,700 km) from its base on the Chesapeake Bay. With prior setup, MADRE was even able to detect rocket launches at Cape Canaveral and atomic tests in Nevada. (Note: The ionized air of the mushroom cloud from a nuclear explosion makes an excellent radar reflector.)

With this successful demonstration, the US Air Force started plans to deploy a similar system in Turkey; providing coverage of much of the western part of the Soviet Union. Tenders for the system outline were placed in 1964 and bids followed the next year for the actual system itself. However, Turkey refused to provide a base for the system and a search started for a new location.

After some time the British offered a site in Suffolk. From this location the radar would be able to see almost all of Eastern Europe as well as the western parts of the Soviet Union. In particular, it would be able to track missile launches from the Northern Fleet Missile Test Center at Plesetsk. Although not as useful as the original site in Turkey, the UK site was nevertheless acceptable and the USAF accepted the new location.

=== Construction ===
In 1966, a new series of bids was sent out for a system to be installed at this site, which was won late in the year by RCA. Construction of the site started in mid-1967 with the buildings and support systems which had to be carefully shielded to avoid contamination from signals being reflected locally. Many of the buildings had to be built on short stilts because the site was below the maximum water height recorded some years earlier.

The site was completed on 10 July 1971 and testing began a week later. Tests of the broadcast system were extensive, including both local measurements as well as tests from distant aircraft. These were completed by September and attention moved to the reception systems. Minor storm damage in October slowed this phase somewhat, but RCA turned the system over to the USAF in February 1972. The original plan to go operational in July was delayed until January 1973, in spite of a truncated testing period that combined the "Design Verification System Test" and "Initial Operational Test and Evaluation" periods.

=== Problems and closure ===
Through the early part of 1972 testing found a considerable amount of unexpected noise, which appeared as frequency shifting of the signal. This made targets appear in all of the filters (high-speed, low-speed, etc.) even when it seemed there was nothing of the sort in that area. For instance, the system would often report missiles being launched no matter where the radar was looking. A lengthy series of investigations into the source of the noise followed and, in desperation, the USAF eventually turned over the testing to a panel headed by SRI International. The new team continued testing from January to May 1973, but no convincing explanation was ever found. Internal problems with the equipment were eliminated as a potential source. One particularly interesting finding was that the distortion only occurred over land. Deliberate electronic countermeasures were not ruled out.

Although the noise was never identified, the panel concluded that the system could still be made operational by further improvements in the receivers; although the resulting system would only be marginally useful. Instead the USAF simply gave up and on 30 June 1973 the system was shut down, never having been used operationally. It is estimated to have cost between $100 and $150 million (equivalent to $1088 million in 2025).

As part of the ABM Treaty, large long-range radars were limited to operation in the home countries of the operators. Whether this had an effect on Cobra Mist is unknown.

The site and buildings were then occupied by a radio transmitting station used mainly for the UK Foreign Office and the BBC World Service from September 1982. When the BBC stopped using the transmitters in 2011, they were brought back into service and briefly used by the Dutch Government to broadcast to Holland during problems with their national transmitters. In August 2015, the site and all the facilities previously held by the UK Foreign Office and the BBC (and prior to them the Ministry of Defence) were acquired by Cobra Mist Limited, a privately owned company. Subsequently in May 2017 Radio Caroline was given a licence to use the 648 kHz frequency previously used by the BBC and now broadcasts from the site.

== Description ==
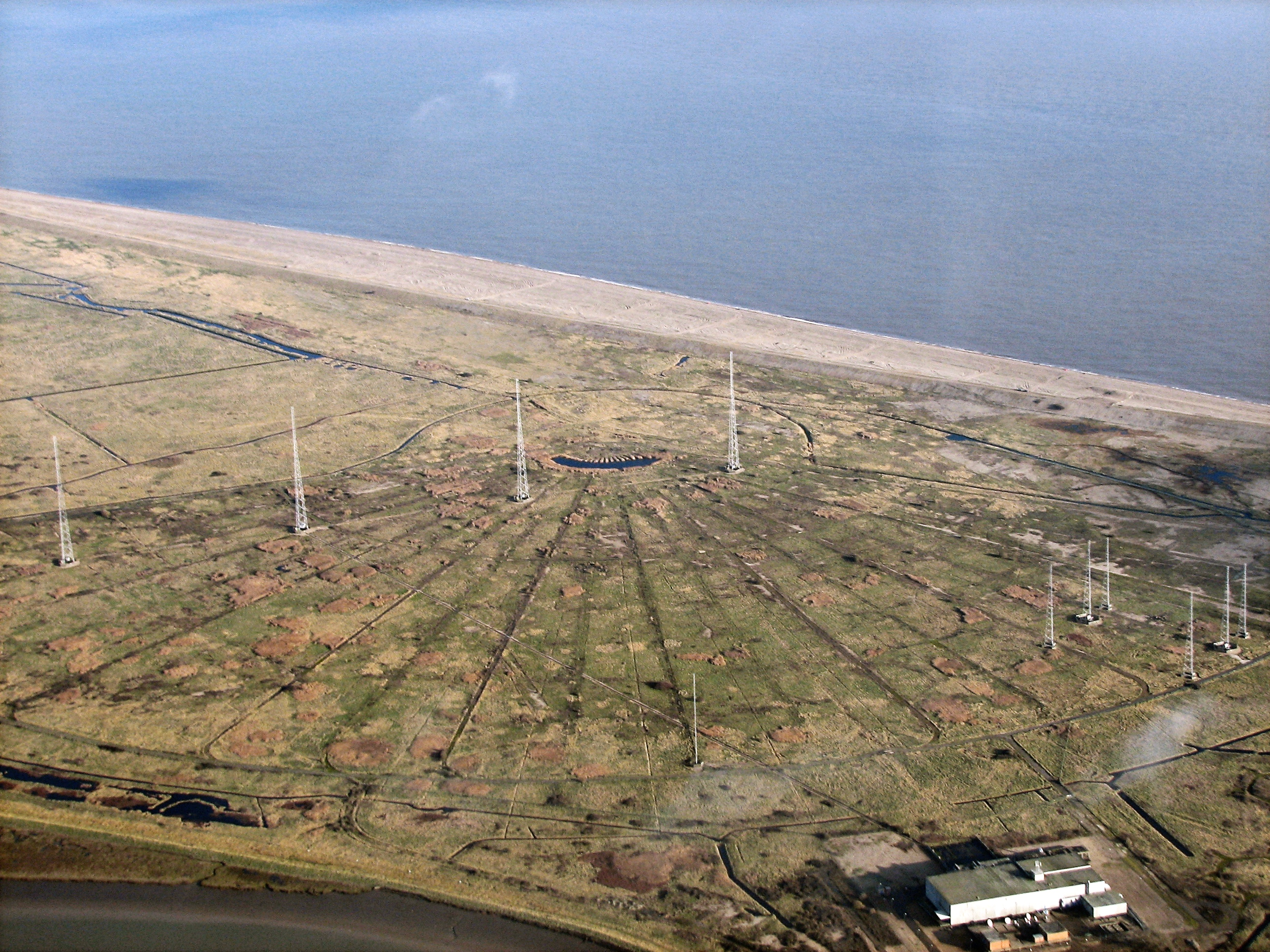
Radiating lines at the site

The AN/FPS-95 antenna consisted of 18 individual strings radiating outward from a single point near the eastern shore of Orford Ness. Each string was 2,040 feet (620 m) long, supported on masts from 42 feet (13 m) to 195 feet (59 m) high, with multiple active elements hung from the strings. The strings were arranged 8 degrees 40 minutes apart, covering an arc from 19.5 to 110.5 degrees clockwise from true north. Beneath the antenna was a large wire mesh screen acting as a reflector. The mesh extended past the hub to the east.

Operating the AN/FPS-95 radar took considerable pre-observation setup. To select a particular region of the sky, six adjacent antennas strings were connected to the electronics using a switch matrix hidden underground at the antenna hub. Using beam steering, the operators would select a 90 degree wide fan-shaped area to investigate. The minimum range was about 500 nmi (930 km) due to the maximum elevation of the beams, while the maximum range was about 2,000 nmi (3,700 km) using one-hop off the ionosphere's F-layer. Ranges between this could be selected by changing the broadcast frequency from 6 to 40 MHz and gated by varying the pulse repetition frequency. Longer ranges were possible under certain conditions by allowing for multi-hop propagation. At high frequencies the active portion would be close to the antenna hub and it would move out toward the larger dipole elements as the frequency was lowered.

The antenna was not particularly effective, with a gain of about 25 dB, so to receive a useful signal from such ranges an enormous broadcast signal was needed. The system could develop a peak power of up to 10 MW, which can be compared to the most powerful commercial radio stations at around 500 kW. Reception of the signal was a complex affair, as very little signal would be returned after a round-trip of several thousand kilometers, requiring a receiver sensitivity of 80 to 90 dB to extract a signal out of the background clutter. The system relied on ultra-linear amplifiers that could amplify the signal across the entire frequency range without introducing distortion.

Key to the operation of any backscatter radar is the ability to filter out the huge return from the ground and sea, and capture only the objects of interest. This is accomplished using the Doppler effect and gating out the vast majority of the signal. In the case of Cobra Mist, the signal was first gated for range by eliminating any signals lying outside a particular time window; thereby selecting targets within a particular area. It was then fed into a series of frequency filters tuned to the expected frequency shifts from various sorts of common targets: lower speed for ships, high speed for aircraft, and constant acceleration for missiles.

== See also ==
- Jindalee over-the-horizon radar
- Duga radar
- List of radars
- List of military electronics of the United States
