= Faithful (Jenn Bostic album) =

Studio album by Jenn Bostic
- Released: June 1, 2015
- Genres: Country, Pop, CCM
- Length: 48:32

Faithful is the third studio album from Jenn Bostic. She released the album on June 1, 2015.

== Critical reception ==
Professional ratings
Review scores
Source	Rating
Cross Rhythms	10/10 squares
The Phantom Tollbooth	3.5/5 stars

Giving the album a ten out of ten at Cross Rhythms, Stephen Luff writes, "This album is outstanding and can only further her success!" Derek Walker, rating the album three and a half out of five from The Phantom Tollbooth, states, "With a generous fourteen songs and no real clunkers, this is worth investigating."

== Track listing ==
No.	Title	Length
1.	"Faithful"	3:38
2.	"Kinda Fell Like Fallin' in Love"	3:21
3.	"Cold and Frozen"	3:12
4.	"Counterfeit"	3:21
5.	"Hurting Me, Hurting You"	3:45
6.	"Shiny New Toy"	2:57
7.	"If You See Him"	3:42
8.	"Little Grace"	4:03
9.	"Still Breathing"	3:23
10.	"Fight for Your Life"	4:13
11.	"I Will Follow"	3:09
12.	"What Love Feels Like"	3:16
13.	"Chasing Rainbows"	4:12
14.	"I Don't Like You at All"	2:20
Total length:		48:32
