= The Golden Hour (radio feature) =

Long-standing radio programme in the United Kingdom

The Golden Hour is a long-standing radio feature in the United Kingdom, in which records are played that all charted in the UK Top 40 in a certain year and listeners are invited to guess the year. First broadcast on BBC Radio in 1973 during Tony Blackburn's mid-morning show, the Golden Hour segment was continued for many years on BBC Radio 1 by Simon Bates, Simon Mayo and Chris Moyles, with Bates currently presenting the feature as a programme on Universal Music's range of Now Music television channels.

== History ==
In June 1973, Noel Edmonds took over presenting the breakfast slot on BBC Radio 1 and Tony Blackburn moved to present the mid-morning slot (9–12 am). One of the features Blackburn started on this show was the Golden Hour. This was originally an hour of records that had all charted in a specified year, using a different year each weekday.

Blackburn continued this feature until he vacated the weekday mid-morning slot in Autumn 1977. He was replaced by Simon Bates, who continued the feature at the top of the show between 9 and 10 am. Bates amended the format, however, turning it into a game for the audience to participate in. Records were played, sometimes interspersed with clues, so listeners could 'play along at home' and work out what the year was. The year would be revealed by Simon near the end of the hour. Later on, Simon split this into two half-hour segments, playing songs from two different years.

Towards the end of 1993, when new controller Matthew Bannister took over and reorganised the station's shows and presenters, Simon Mayo moved from breakfast to mid-morning, taking over the feature from Bates. The Golden Hour, or Mystery Years, as they were now sometimes referred to, lasted until November 1996 when they were replaced with an hour of music from a number of years including the current one. Between May 1994 and October 1995, Sundays also featured The Classic Years (12–2 pm), also presented by Mayo. There was also a feature which ran between 1996 and 1999 on Fridays called Golden Hour Jukebox, then The Jukebox, then Greatest Hits Jukebox, where listeners could ring in and suggest tracks instead of the normal format.

The 9–10 weekday slot was eventually named Radio 1's Greatest Hits, becoming the somewhat unwieldy Radio 1's Greatest Hits: The Mystery Years in 1999. Listeners were challenged to answer a question on a piece of archive footage from the relevant year.

Mayo continued The Mystery Years until he left the station on 16 February 2001.

== Revival ==
Chris Moyles ran a one-off edition of the Golden Hour on 22 July 2005 on the BBC Radio 1 breakfast show, during an outside broadcast on a canal boat to Oxford.

In September 2007, as part of the station's 40th-anniversary commemoration, Moyles presented a series of Golden Hour segments on the Radio 1 breakfast show. On 30 September, Moyles co-hosted a programme with Tony Blackburn, the former breakfast show host, and between 9 and 10 am they featured the Golden Hour in the form of two half-hour years. At the start of 2008, The Chris Moyles Show gained the Golden Hour as a permanent feature, although only once a week rather than every day as in previous years. Moyles played this every Friday, starting at 9 am with half an hour of songs from a year and getting the listeners (as well as friends of the show) to text in their guess before revealing it ahead of the 9:30 news. From 9:30 to 10 am Moyles played songs selected by each member of his team. Moyles used retro jingles from the initial Golden Hour in his Friday slot. This ceased when Moyles left the station in September 2012.

Since 21 September 2015, Moyles presents a new feature, The Platinum Hour, on his Radio X breakfast show between 9 am and 10 am on Friday mornings and a shorter version between 10:40 and 11:00 on his Saturday show.

Other broadcasters on UK commercial radio have run features similar to the Golden Hour around the same time of day; an example is The Time Tunnel on the Heart network.

Tony Blackburn's Friday and later Sunday evening show on BBC Radio 2, Tony Blackburn's Golden Hour, first aired on 6 January 2017 and features music from the 1950s to the present day, without the game element.

== Smooth Radio ==
Simon Bates revived the Golden Hour for commercial radio after joining Smooth Radio in January 2011. The feature appeared as before, on weekdays between 9 and 10 am on Bates' breakfast show, and saw listeners invited to guess the year that a number of songs charted. There were usually two featured years per day, but this changed to one from October 2013. On Friday 21 March 2014, Bates presented his final show for Smooth and announced that he was featuring the last Golden Hour on his programme.

== BBC Radio Devon ==
Simon Bates joined BBC Radio Devon on 12 January 2015, where he relaunched The Golden Hour with new jingles, with the years ranging from 1956 to 2004. Bates usually asked listeners to send him emails and texts with the year they thought it might be, and he read them in between the music. The feature remained when Bates left the station in 2017, but was renamed The Gordon Hour after new breakfast host Gordon Sparks took over.

== Now Music ==
In the 2020s, Bates has been presenting a number of music video shows on Universal Music's Now 70s, Now 80s and Now 90s television channels, with the programmes either being billed under the Golden Hour or Simon Bates' New Golden Hour name. Similar to his old BBC Radio 1 programmes, these pop video programmes are of a hits and headlines format, but without the part where people are invited to ring in to guess the year, as each programme is pre-recorded in advance and each year is listed on the channels' programme guides as part of the programme title.
