= Boogie Nights (musical) =

British musical play

- Music: Various Artists
- Lyrics: Various Artists
- Book: Jon Conway
- Basis: 70s Boogie & Disco
- Productions: 1998 West End

Boogie Nights is a British musical play, based upon the pop music of the 1970s, written by Jon Conway with Shane Richie and Terry Morrison. Its 2013 production starred Jimmy Osmond, Jay Osmond, Merrill Osmond and Gareth Gates.

== History ==
The musical premiered at Bromley in November 1997, and debuted on the West End at the Savoy Theatre in October 1998, directed by Jon Conway (its writer). Boogie Nights was also performed by WYMT (Wakefield Youth Music Theatre) at Wakefield Theatre Royal in September 2008 where it was performed by youths ages 12–19 for 2 weeks.

== Plot ==
Debs and Roddy are a couple. Roddy has a dream to be a rock star. They have been together for five years, as have their best friends Terry and Trish. There is a fancy dance contest at their local discotheque, Boogie Nights, and Roddy promises he will go with Debs. Debs then reveals to Trish that she is pregnant with Roddy's baby.

Roddy's dad, Eamon, is a big fan of Elvis Presley. Eamon tells Roddy to treat Debs better and to get a regular job. But Roddy is distracted by his dreams of stardom to notice that he is hurting anyone.

Days later, Debs is waiting for Roddy to pick her up from shopping. He doesn't, but she is met by Dean, the DJ at Boogie Nights. He tells Debs that Roddy is not good enough for her, and that she should leave Roddy for him. They kiss.

Roddy meets with the singer in the disco's band Lorraine and her boyfriend Spencer (also a singer). They are rowing, and he storms off. Lorraine and Roddy then cheat together on their partners. Lorraine tells Roddy that she is going to enter the dance contest with him. At the contest, Roddy's lovers meet and realise what is happening. Debs dumps Roddy and subsequently has a miscarriage.

When Elvis dies, Eamon is heartbroken, and when Roddy complains, Eamon tries to put everything in perspective. Roddy uses a picture of what he thinks is Elvis but when he looks it is his deceased mother. Eamon throws Roddy out and forgets about Roddy.

Weeks later, Terry comes over to Roddy's and tells him that Debs is romantically involved with Dean. Roddy finally accepts that his romantic relationship with Debs is over. He goes over to Debs', and she tells him about the baby.

Spencer gives Roddy the job of singer in his band. He runs to tell Debs the news, but she tells him some news first—she and Dean are engaged. Eamon tells Spencer he wants to make up with Roddy but if he says sorry. Terry is best man at their wedding; Roddy is the singer. When Spencer asks for song requests, Roddy makes a request to come home. Roddy and Eamon patch things up.

Everyone has what they wanted: Eamon is close to Roddy, Dean is with Debs, Debs has someone to trust, and Roddy is a professional singer. However, Roddy wonders if he really wanted this dream; what if he had the choice would he have chosen Debs?

== Characters ==
- Roddy - main character
- Debs - Roddy's girlfriend
- Terry - a garage mechanic
- Trish - Debs' friend and Terry's girlfriend
- Eamon - Roddy's father
- Dean - DJ at the club Boogie Nights
- Spencer - front man for the resident band
- Lorraine - singer in the local band and Spencer's girlfriend
- Mandy - an ex-girlfriend of Roddy
- Cinema Manager - manager of the cinema

== Musical numbers ==
Act I

- "Ladies' Night" / "Car Wash"/ "Dancing Queen" (Recorded Track)
- "Boogie Nights"(Recorded Track)
- "Celebration" - Roddy and Company
- Scene Change - Instrumental
- "If You Leave Me Now" - Instrumental
- Scene Change - Instrumental
- Blame It On The Boogie Medley - Company
- Heaven Must Be Missing An Angel [Recorded Track
- "Lady Marmalade" - Lorraine, Girls
- "You Sexy Thing" - Spencer
- "Don't Go Breaking My Heart" - Debs, Roddy, Trish, Terry
- "Always On My Mind" - Recorded Track
- "All Shook Up" - Eamon, Roddy, Dean, Terry - Band Tacet
- Scene Change - Instrumental
- Yesterday Once More - Debs, Ensemble
- Bye Bye Baby - Terry, Roddy
- Medley - Shaft/ Kung Fu Fighting / Happy Days - Company
- Medley Playout - Instrumental
- Pearl and Dean Theme - Recorded Track
- "Jaws Theme" - Recorded Track
- Sugar Baby Love - Terry, Boys
- Sugar Baby Love Playoff - Instrumental
- "Just The Way You Are" - Spencer - Band Tacet
- "Jammin'" - Spencer - Band Tacet
- "Y.M.C.A." - Spencer, Roddy, Terry, Dean, Eamon
- Scene Change - Instrumental
- "Don't Go Breaking My Heart" / "Yesterday Once More" - Debs, Dean
- "Enough Is Enough" - Debs, Lorraine
- "If You Leave Me Now" - Roddy
- "Jailhouse Rock" - Eamon
- Funky Music No 1 - "Play That Funky Music White Boy" - Roddy
- "A Little Bit More" - Recorded Track
- "Last Dance" / "Reach Out" - Lorraine, Debs

Act II

- Entr' acte - Instrumental
- I Lost My Heart To A Starship Trooper - Trish, Ensemble
- "Disco Inferno" - Trish, Dean, Terry, Ensemble
- Grease Sting No 1 - Instrumental
- Grease Sting No 2 - Roddy
- Grease Sting No 3 - Instrumental
- Dead Man / Street Life Sting - Lorraine
- "I Will Survive" - Debs
- Street Life - Reprise - Instrumental
- Always On My Mind - Eamon
- "Sorry Seems To Be The Hardest Word" - Roddy, Eamon, Ensemble
- Theme from "Our Tune" - Radio - Recorded Track
- Shaddup a Ya Face - Radio - Recorded Track
- If You Leave Me Now - Instrumental
- If You Leave Me Now - All, Roddy
- Celebrate Scene Change - Instrumental
- Scene Change - Instrumental
- Yesterday Once More - Underscore - Instrumental
- Play That Funky Music - Reprise - Roddy, Ensemble
- "Boogie Wonderland" - Company
- Finale Megamix - Can You Feel The Force / Instant Replay / "Ain't No Stoppin' Us Now" / "Disco Inferno" / "We Are Family" - Company
- Finale Playout - Company
