= The Jo Whiley Show =

- Genre: Music and entertainment
- Running time: Weekdays, 10:00am – 12:45pm, Weekends 13:00 - 16:00, Bank Holidays 10.00–13.00 Good Fridays 10.00–13.00
- Country of origin: United Kingdom
- Language: English
- Home station: BBC Radio 1
- Hosted by: Jo Whiley
- Original release: 19 February 2001 – 27 March 2011
- Audio format: FM and Digital radio and online

The Jo Whiley Show is a British weekday later weekend radio show on BBC Radio 1 hosted by Jo Whiley. The programme was on air from February 2001 to March 2011 when Whiley left for BBC Radio 2, and was broadcast each weekday morning between 10:00am and 12:45pm, and later 13:00-16:00 each weekend afternoon.

== Show format ==
The show began at 10:00am and lasted for two and three quarter hours every day. News and sport was read at 10:30am and 11:30am & Bank Holidays and Good Fridays at 12.30. It also featured the latest entertainment news with Natalie Jamieson at 12:00pm. In addition the show had a number of features as well as guests and live music performances from well-known artists. The show handed over to Newsbeat at 12:45.

== History ==
Jo Whiley had a weekday lunchtime show from February 1997. This was originally called The Jo Whiley Show, but later changed its name to The Lunchtime Social. This included elements of the evening show, such as tour dates and occasional live 'sessions' at Maida Vale Studios while working within the restrictions of Radio 1's daytime schedule. When Simon Mayo left BBC Radio 1 for BBC Radio 5 Live and BBC Radio 2 in February 2001, Whiley's show was moved to a mid morning slot and regained its original name.

In July 2008 The Jo Whiley Show was fined £75,000 for misleading listeners, along with other BBC programmes totaling £400,000. The incident involved a member of BBC staff posing as a member of the public taking part in a competition. The BBC claim Whiley herself was unaware of the deception at the time of its broadcast.

In July 2009 it was announced that the Jo Whiley show would finish broadcasting on weekdays on Radio 1 in September as part of a major shake up of the station's weekday schedule. The shake up would see Greg James move to the afternoon slot (then occupied by Edith Bowman), and Fearne Cotton as Cotton herself moves to weekdays. Cotton took over the famous Live Lounge segment. Whiley's final weekday program took place on 18 September 2009, and her final weekend programme took place on 27 March 2011.

== Features ==
There were numerous features on the show. Features which were running at the weekday show's are marked in bold type:

- **Live Lounge** – Where invited artists would come into the studio to perform music from their new album/single as well as performing a cover version of a song they particularly admired. They would give their own take on it. Selected guests included Goldfrapp and Nelly Furtado Florence + the Machine's version of Halo by Beyoncé was stated to be the best cover in the history of the Live Lounge when it was performed in 2009. This was a popular feature of the show and several compilation albums of such covered music have been released.
- **Changing Tracks** – Daily feature – This is when a listener would email in and ask for a song that reminded them of a time in their life when music changed everything, particularly if that had had a great experience or whether a song provided some kind of comfort after a traumatic time. This feature was similar to former BBC Radio 1 DJ Simon Bates's Our Tune.
- **Pet Sound** – Daily feature – A song considered by Jo to be something that we need to hear. It usually had not been released or was due to be released in due time. This song would be played once on Jo's show for the week and it changed every week.
- **Marilyn Manson was never in The Wonder Years** – This happened infrequently. Basically if there was a question that a listener did not know the answer to and would like answered, then this was the place to find out. The title comes from the urban legend that Marilyn Manson was a cast member for the series The Wonder Years when actually he wasn't.
- **I Have Never...** – An occasional feature where Jo embarked on something she had never done in her life. Listeners were also challenged to the same thing, examples including not watching television for a whole week and trying a sport for the very first time.
- **What Rocked? What Sucked?** – This feature involved listeners e-mailing or texting the show to tell Jo and the listening audience what went well and what didn't. Jo sometimes offered her own view from time to time. This feature took place on a Friday allowing listeners to reflect upon the good and bad points of the week that had passed.
- **7 Song Shuffle** – Daily feature – A mishmash of seven different songs would be played to a listener via telephone and they would then be given around 45 seconds to name the artist and song title. The number of correct answers they got corresponded to the number of albums they would receive as prizes. The actual prize was vouchers for popular music store HMV, which came in £10 denominations to represent the number of albums. If not all seven songs were guessed correctly then other listeners could claim them by texting or emailing the missing answers. It was more difficult than it appeared, as the contestants had to listen to the jumbled tracks on the telephone rather than the radio, making the songs harder to differentiate. In the show's eight-year run, only four people correctly answered all seven songs. After 17 July 2007 the game became 'just for fun' with listeners playing along at home and no prizes on offer due to the BBC's suspension of all telephone competitions.
- **We Love Mondays** – Weekly feature – At the start of each week, Jo would run through various reasons to be happy on a Monday morning, such as what was showing at the cinema, what music albums and singles were being released and what was coming up on television and radio.
- **Ask the Experts** – Weekly feature – For this feature, listeners were able to e-mail in their dilemmas or questions to a certain expert, whether it be about video games, gadgets, fashion, entertainment, money & business, sport, or relationships. The full list of experts featured in this section was;
- Martin Lewis – Money
- Angela Buttolph – Fashion
- Johnny Minkley – Video Games
- Tracey Cox – Relationships
- Tom Dunmore – Gadgets
- Natalie Jamieson – Entertainment News
- Mark Chapman – Sport

Weekend show's features include;

- **Jo's Road Trip**
- **Top of the Shops**
- **SpellStar**
- **Live Lounge** (same as her former weekday mid-morning show)
