= Tony Blackburn =

British radio presenter, offshore broadcaster (born 1943)

Tony Blackburn OBE
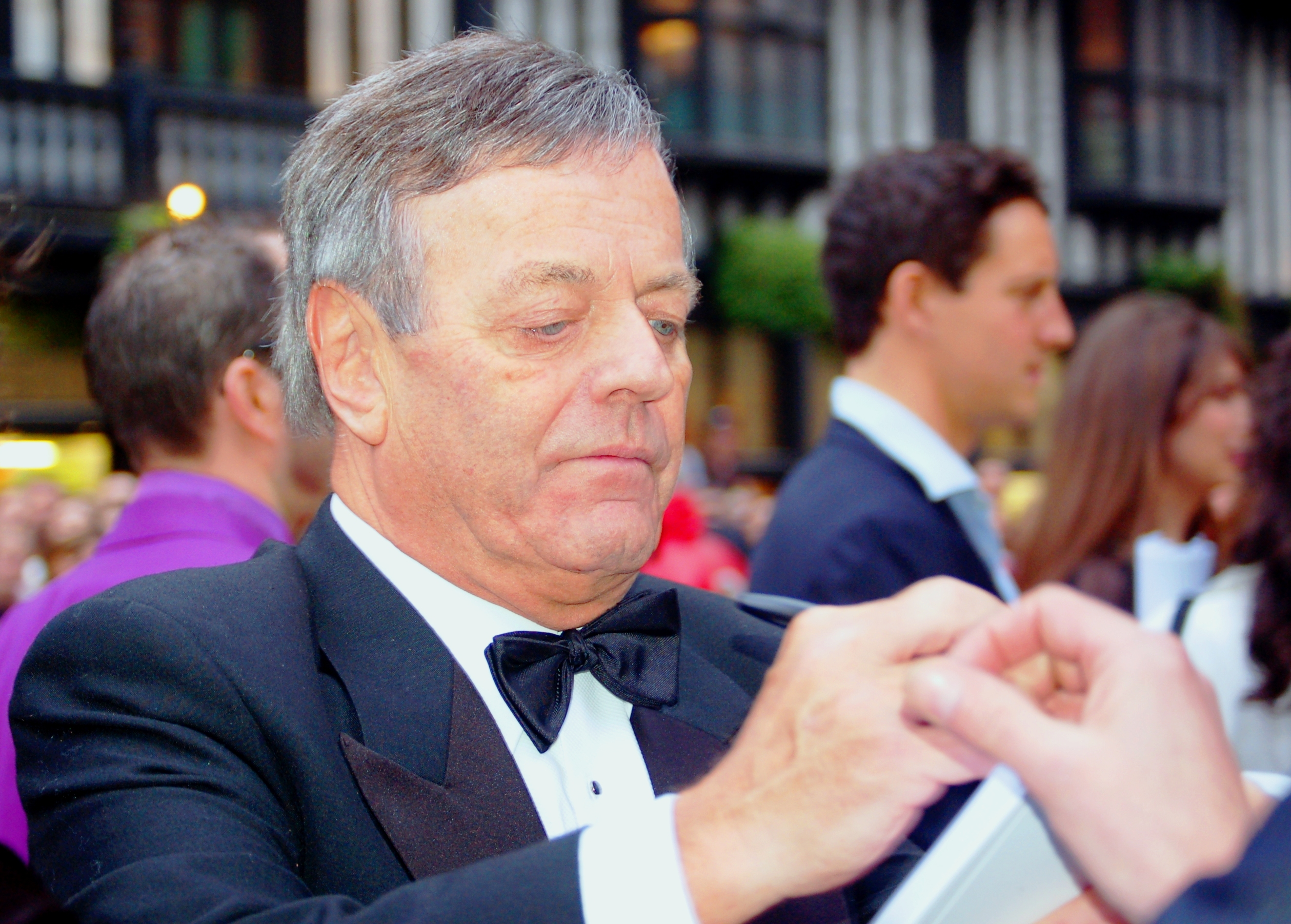
- Blackburn at the BAFTA Awards in 2008
- Born: Antony Kenneth Blackburn; 29 January 1943 (age 83); Guildford, Surrey, England
- Occupations: Disc jockey; singer; TV presenter; broadcaster
- Years active: 1964–present
- Spouses: Tessa Wyatt (m. 1972; div. 1977) Debbie Thomson (m. 1992)
- Children: 2

Antony Kenneth Blackburn OBE (born 29 January 1943) is an English disc jockey, singer and television presenter, whose career spans over 60 years.

Blackburn first achieved fame broadcasting on the pirate stations Radio Caroline and Radio London in the 1960s, before joining the BBC, initially broadcasting on the BBC Light Programme.

Blackburn was the first disc jockey to broadcast on BBC Radio 1 at its launch, on 30 September 1967, and has had several stints working for the corporation. He has also worked for Capital London, Classic Gold Digital and BBC Local Radio, and currently BBC Radio 2 and British Forces Broadcasting Service. As a DJ, Blackburn is known for his championing of Motown and soul music as well as his popular presenting style.

In 2002, Blackburn was the first winner of the British reality TV series I'm a Celebrity...Get Me Out of Here!

== Early life ==
Blackburn was born in Guildford, Surrey, on 29 January 1943. In 1946 the family moved to Poole, Dorset, where his youngest sister, Jacqueline, was born, suffering from polio and unable to walk. Blackburn's father, Kenneth Fleming Blackburn, was a GP and his mother, Pauline Cubitt (née Stone), was a nurse. He was educated at Castle Court School in Corfe Mullen, near Poole in Dorset. He gained entry to Millfield in Somerset on a "half" sports scholarship and captained the school's cricket team.

Blackburn left before taking any examinations, but gained O-levels following private tuition, and enrolled for an HND course in business studies at Bournemouth Technical College.

== Career ==
=== Early career as disc jockey ===
After beginning his career as a singer, Blackburn then worked as a DJ for the offshore pirate radio stations Radio Caroline and Radio London, before joining the BBC in the summer of 1967, initially broadcasting on the BBC Light Programme.

After a simulcast with BBC Radio 2 hosted by Paul Hollingdale, Blackburn was the first DJ to be heard on BBC Radio 1 when it officially launched at 7 a.m. on 30 September 1967, with his first words on the new station being: "And good morning everyone! Welcome to the exciting new sound of Radio 1!" The Move's "Flowers in the Rain" was the first complete record he played. Blackburn recalled in 2014: "My job was to entertain and tell corny jokes, not have opinions or talk politics. If I wanted to wish the Queen a happy birthday, I had to get clearance from above." In the early years of his Radio 1 career Blackburn often employed an audio clip of a barking dog, "Arnold", over an extract of Johnny Dankworth's 1964 tune "Beefeaters", which he had previously used at Radio Caroline and Radio London.

At first he was associated mainly with mainstream pop, but he later championed soul music. It was largely due to him that "I'm Still Waiting" by Diana Ross, which was initially just an album track, was released as a single in the UK in 1971 and reached number one. He was a regular host of Top of the Pops for more than a decade and he appeared with fellow DJs Jimmy Savile, Noel Edmonds and Kenny Everett on the 500th show special, where he performed the spoken part of "Won't Somebody Dance with Me" and danced with singer Lynsey de Paul.

In 1968, he fronted his own show, Time For Blackburn, produced by Southern Television for the ITV network. "The Radio 1 DJs were a massive attraction. We were mobbed everywhere we went", Blackburn told Simon Hattenstone, referring to personal appearances. "It was all a bit mad, but great fun", he told Judith Woods in 2014. "The DJs were built up to be stars in our own right, and as a result we were as famous as the artists we played."

In 1973, when his pantomime performance was interrupted by a power cut, he said the miners should "go back to work". He was admonished by management and taken off-air for two weeks. In an interview for the Radio Academy's Radio Talk podcast in 2013, Blackburn said that it is "not advisable" for a broadcaster to reveal their political allegiances. In this interview, he said that he is "not a great lover of the TUC or of unions ... but I keep it to myself now."

=== Singing career ===
He was in a group called Tony Blackburn and the Rovers which at one point included Al Stewart; they performed in Bournemouth and the surrounding areas. His singing career failed to take off, although three studio albums and fourteen singles were released, of which two, "So Much Love" and "It's Only Love", made the UK Top 50 in 1968 and 1969 respectively. "So Much Love" suffered from a shortage of copies because "the pressing plant went on strike, so nobody could get the record", he once recalled. "I don't think the strike was anything to do with the record, though it might have been... quality control or something."

In 1972, he released a self-titled album on the RCA label. Two of the tracks were released as singles: "Chop Chop", written by Nicky Chinn and Mike Chapman, and "House of Cards", written by Lynsey de Paul and Barry Green. His version of Doris Troy's "I'll Do Anything" was recorded in 1969 for his second album, Tony Blackburn, which was released on the Polydor label. This version of the Gamble and Huff song was re-discovered by Northern soul fans when it was pressed up as a white label and became a hit on the scene's dancefloors. The single was re-released as a single under the pseudonym Lenny Gamble on Casino Classics in June 1978, with the pseudonym being a portmanteau of songwriters Leon Huff and Kenny Gamble.

All of Blackburn's singles, including "I'll Do Anything" and "House of Cards" were released in 2012 on a CD compilation album The Singles Collection 1965–1980 on the Cherry Red label.

In 2007, Blackburn featured on a dance remix of "I Am A Cider Drinker" by English Scrumpy & Western band, The Wurzels. He also appeared in the video.

=== From 1973 to 1984 ===
In June 1973, Blackburn took over Jimmy Young's mid-morning slot, when Young moved across to Radio 2. At this occasion, he introduced "The Golden Hour". The feature was to prove durable, being carried on by Simon Bates and Simon Mayo when they subsequently took over that time slot, in addition of being later featured in Chris Moyles' breakfast show.

Over several years of the 1970s, Blackburn was a co-presenter on the BBC's summer programme Seaside Special, alongside other well-known names from BBC Radio, such as Dave Lee Travis and David Hamilton.

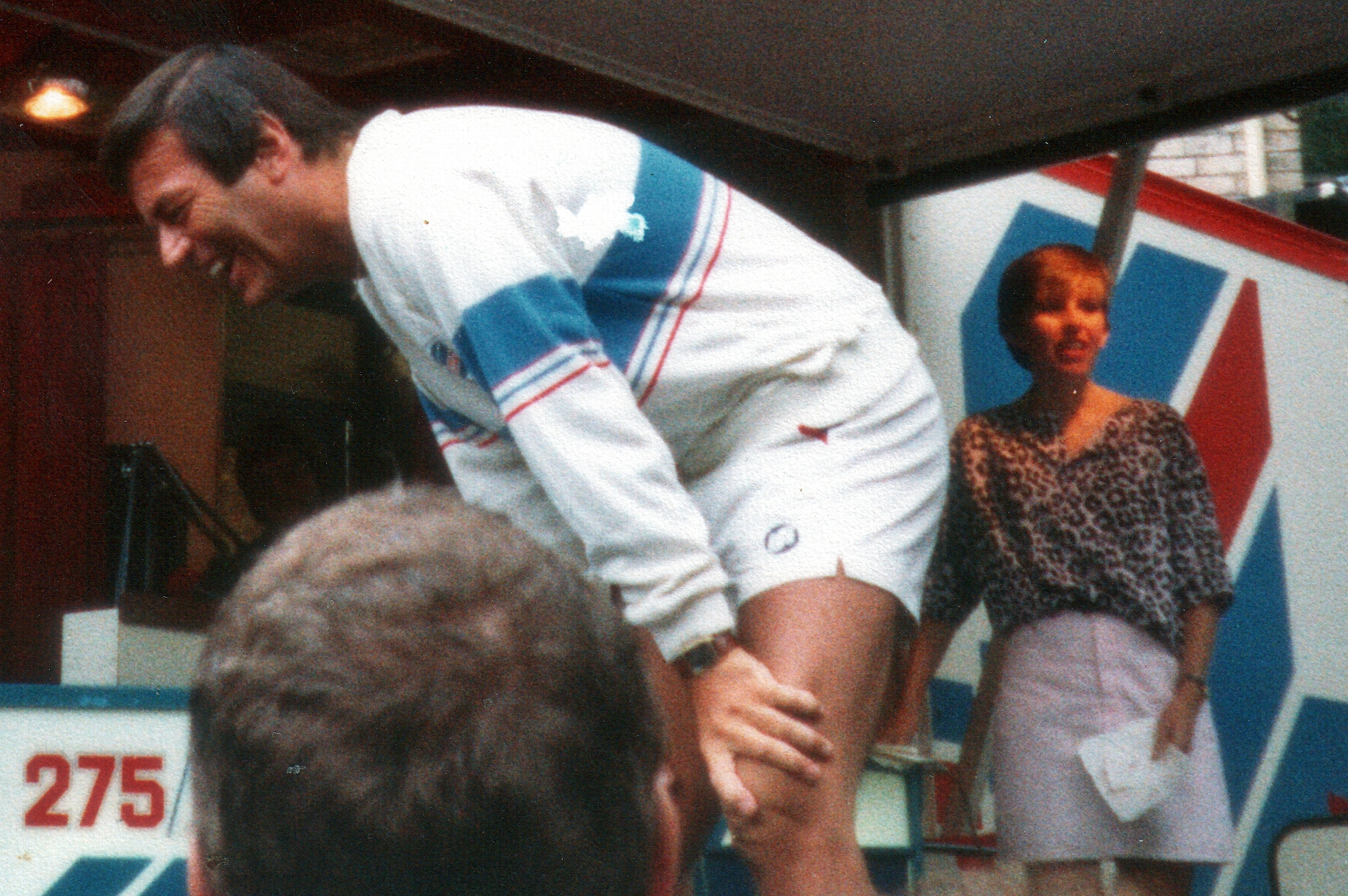
With Maggie Philbin at a Radio 1 Roadshow in the early 1980s

At the start of 1980, he took over from Ed Stewart as the presenter of Junior Choice, broadcast on Saturday and Sunday mornings from 8 am to 10 am, while continuing to present the Sunday chart show until early 1982, being succeeded by Tommy Vance. During 1982, BBC Radio 1 dropped the name Junior Choice and the show became Tony Blackburn's Saturday Show and Tony Blackburn's Sunday Show. Blackburn hosted both shows until he left the station on 23 September 1984, after seventeen years of broadcasting.

In addition to his Radio 1 weekend show, he joined BBC Radio London in 1981, where he presented the afternoon show. It was here that he showed his appreciation of soul music. "Soul music is sexy music, raunchy music. I didn't want it to be a niche thing, I wanted to bring it to a mass audience. I wanted cab drivers to listen to it because I think pop soul is fabulous, I do, really", he told Simon Hattenstone. He left the station after over 40 years in December 2023.

From the mid to late 1980s, Blackburn presented the show "Soul Station" on BFBS Radio.

Blackburn had a difficult relationship with fellow DJ John Peel, whom he recalled saying: "'People don't realise how much you've done for soul music', and I said: 'I bet you'd never say that publicly', and he said: 'Oh no!'"

In 1984, he took over Radio London's weekday mid-morning show, playing a pure soul format.

=== Later career ===
He joined Capital London in 1988, and was involved in the launch of Capital Gold London station, presenting programmes such as the Breakfast show, Weekends, Drivetime then the Weekday evening show playing his own choice of music, where he remained until 2002. He hosted similar shows on Jazz FM in London and Smooth FM Smooth, and the Real Radio Network.

In 1987, Blackburn made an extended appearance on the second ever edition of After Dark on Channel 4. In 1989, Blackburn co-presented the morning TV show Sky by Day on Sky One. The show aired weekdays at 11am and was broadcast live.

He was the subject of This Is Your Life in 1992, when he was surprised by Michael Aspel while broadcasting his Capital Gold radio show at the company's studios in London.

In 2002, Blackburn was the winner of the first series of the British reality TV show I'm a Celebrity...Get Me Out of Here!

In 2004, Blackburn re-joined BBC Radio London, originally taking over a two-hour timeslot on Monday evening from 8pm to 10pm. Here he would be given free rein on his choice of music. In addition to this he also took over the station's Saturday Lunchtime show, broadcasting from 12noon to 2pm.

Blackburn began presenting the Breakfast show for Bedfordshire-based Classic Gold Digital in late 2003. He was suspended in June 2004 for playing too many Cliff Richard records as the singer was not on the station's playlist. Noel Edmonds, whose company owned a majority shareholding, thought Blackburn would soon return to broadcasting for the station. The suspension was short-lived. Blackburn won his dispute with management over the playlist a few days later, and Cliff Richard was added to it. "We should be playing him as much as The Beatles," said the station head. While hosting the breakfast show, he left his Monday evening show on Radio London but continued to present Saturday Lunchtime.

"I'm still a part of the disco generation," Blackburn told The Times in December 2004. "There is no pretence there and it never seems to date. I think disco did much more as a contribution to music than Bob Dylan or Neil Young. People get snobbish about music. Disco never takes itself too seriously."

In early 2008, Blackburn took over Weekend Breakfast on Smooth Radio, originally broadcasting to London audiences only, but a couple of months later the show was networked across the Smooth Radio network.

On 6 November 2010, Blackburn replaced Dale Winton as the regular host of BBC Radio 2's Pick of the Pops programme. One of his remaining ambitions was to present a programme on Radio 2. "I was 37 when I left Radio 1, and 2 seemed a natural progression. So it's only taken 30 years," Blackburn said in 2010. Blackburn presented the show every Saturday from 1pm to 3pm. He also presented shows on BBC Radio Berkshire from 10pm to 1am on Fridays and Sundays, and BBC London 94.9 on Sundays from 12noon to 3pm.

Between 2 July 2016 and June 2017, Blackburn presented a weekly four-hour soul music show, the Soul and Motown Show, every Saturday from 6pm to 10pm on London's DAB station Thames Radio.

From 2007 to 2020, he presented a weekly three-hour show, Tony's Blackburn's Playlist every Sunday from 4pm to 7pm on KMFM in Kent. This included a retro chart feature for many years.

Blackburn has won two lifetime achievement awards from the Radio Academy, the second of which was to mark his 50 years of broadcasting.

In 2023, Blackburn launched the digital music channel That's 60s, focusing on 1960s music. He chose "Flowers in the Rain" as the first song to be played, similar to Radio 1.

In October 2024, he was featured in BBC's Mortimer & Whitehouse: Gone Fishing.

In December 2025, he appeared on one of Jenni Murray's last recorded interviews, Experience is Everything sponsored by Saga plc. He discussed with her, his career and family and gave an insight into his obsession with collecting logs while in Australia where he became the first winner of, I'm a Celebrity...Get Me Out of Here!

=== BBC dismissal and return ===
On 24 February 2016, Blackburn was dismissed by the BBC in an announcement from Lord Hall, the corporation's Director General, stating that the contents of documents from the early 1970s were in conflict with evidence Blackburn had given to Dame Janet Smith's inquiry into Jimmy Savile's sexual abuse at BBC premises. Blackburn said he repeatedly told Smith and the BBC that he had never been interviewed about an alleged incident in the 1970s and that Smith's report made no suggestion that he was guilty of any misconduct whatsoever. Smith found Blackburn's denial that he was interviewed by light entertainment head Bill Cotton and Sir Brian Neill QC unsatisfactory. Neill had been appointed by the BBC to look into unrelated matters concerning Top of the Pops. Cotton's colleague, Tony Preston, had written a memo at the time concerning the interviews. Neill, the only one of the three men still alive, initially declined to comment, but later said he had interviewed Blackburn and in 1972, had cleared him of wrongdoing.

Blackburn complained that the BBC was dismissing him and damaging his career based on the discrepancy. He said that like Smith's report, a coroner's inquest and a police inquiry had made no suggestion that he was guilty of any misconduct, adding that the report was a "whitewash" and that he had been "scapegoated" for giving his best recollections of events 45 years before. He asked: "Given Dame Janet Smith's concerns of a culture of fear in coming forward at the BBC, what whistle-blower at the BBC would ever come forward when they see the way they have hung me out to dry?" He said he intended to take legal action against the BBC.

Nina Myskow commented on Radio 2: "It should be a sad black day for the BBC because of the revelations about the whole Savile episode, but in fact that's been buried very cleverly by the BBC as usual by sacking Tony Blackburn."

Blackburn continued to present a show on KMFM. A spokesman for the station said, "He is a great asset, a fantastic broadcaster and someone we are proud to work with."

In October 2016, it was reported that Blackburn would again be working for the BBC, presenting an hour-long programme on BBC Radio 2 on Friday evenings, and additionally returning to BBC Local Radio. He returned to BBC Radio 2 on New Year's Eve 2016, and to BBC Local Radio on both New Year's Day and 6 January 2017, opening with Gloria Gaynor's "I Will Survive".

Blackburn now presents Sounds of the 60s on Radio 2, having taken over on 4 March 2017 from Brian Matthew, who hosted it for 27 years. The show is now broadcast live on Saturday mornings between 06:00 and 08:00, and he now also presents his Golden Hour music programme on Sunday nights.

On 30 September 2017, Blackburn recreated his first Radio 1 breakfast show on BBC Radio 2, playing the songs from vinyl, and he later joined Nick Grimshaw, and guests Mike Read, Simon Mayo and Sara Cox for a special show to celebrate the 50th anniversary of the launches of Radio 1 and Radio 2.

In 2020, Blackburn teamed up with Kaiser Chiefs frontman Ricky Wilson to present a new series of podcasts entitled Ricky and Tony's Pop Detectives. The shows centre around Blackburn and Wilson trying to unravel long-held myths and rumours about pop stars' lives and their music. The first episode centred around whether Debbie Harry had really been in a car with serial killer Ted Bundy, as she had previously claimed. The series was released to positive reviews and a further series was released in the summer of 2020.

On 2 January 2023, in the month in which he celebrated his 80th birthday, Blackburn presented a two-hour slot, "Your Soul Mate" for BBC Radio 2, sharing his favourite genre of music and his personal memories associated with the playlist.

== Personal life ==
On 2 March 1972, Blackburn married actress Tessa Wyatt, at Caxton Hall in Westminster. The couple had a son, who was born on 8 April 1973, but they divorced in November 1977 after separating the previous year. In his autobiography Blackburn said that he slept with hundreds of women after his divorce. In the early 1980s he suffered from depression.

On 13 June 1992, he married Debra "Debbie" Thomson, a theatrical agent, at St Margaret's, Westminster. They have a daughter, who was born in 1997. He has two grandsons.

Blackburn has been a vegetarian since he was four. He lives in Arkley, London Borough of Barnet.

In April 2023, Blackburn took a leave of absence from his radio work and other work commitments. Whilst working in Milton Keynes he felt unwell and on returning home, he collapsed and was admitted to hospital with a chest infection; he fully recovered and resumed his radio work.

== Honours ==
Blackburn was appointed Officer of the Order of the British Empire (OBE) in the 2024 New Year Honours for services to broadcasting and charity.

== Filmography ==
The two tables below only show performances Blackburn has been in as an actor or playing a fictional character.

=== Film ===
Year	Title	Role
1970	Simon, Simon	Fireman
2011	Kill Keith	Tony Burnblack

=== Television ===
Year	Title	Role	Notes
1968	Theatre 625	Radio voice	One episode
1969	Fraud Squad	Radio DJ	One episode
1971	The Liver Birds	Radio DJ	One episode (uncredited)
1972	Softly, Softly: Task Force	Radio 1 DJ	One episode (uncredited)
1975	The Goodies	Himself	Two episodes
1985	The Gong Show		Television film
1989	The Little and Large Show		One episode
1991	The Lisa Maxwell Show	Guest	One episode
1992—1995	Noel's House Party		Two episodes
1996	The All New Adventures of Mr Blobby	Busker	
1996—1999	The Queen's Nose	Presenter	Two episodes
2002	Doctor Who: The Monthly Adventures	Disc jockey	One episode
2006	Comedy Lab	Himself	One episode
2009	The All Star Impressions Show	Prince Philip, Duke of Edinburgh	
2012	Dead Boss	Himself	One episode
2014	The Life of Rock with Brian Pern	Reggie Yates / Himself	Two episodes
2022	Greatest Pop Videos	Narrator	One episode

Media offices
Preceded by First	BBC Radio 1 Breakfast Show presenter 1967–1973	Succeeded by Noel Edmonds
Preceded by Simon Bates	BBC Radio 1 Chart show presenter 2 September 1979 – 3 January 1982	Succeeded by Tommy Vance
Preceded by First	Smooth Radio; Weekend breakfast show presenter 2008–2010	Succeeded by Graham Dene
Preceded by Dale Winton	BBC Radio 2 Pick of the Pops presenter 2010–2016	Succeeded by Paul Gambaccini

Preceded by First	I'm A Celebrity, Get Me Out of Here! Winner & King of The Jungle; 2002	Succeeded by Phil Tufnell
