= Sam Plank =

Terry Hilton (1948/1949 – 10 February 2011, better known as Sam Plank) was a British local radio broadcaster, known for his talk-based radio programmes in Staffordshire, The Potteries and Stoke-on-Trent on BBC Radio Stoke and Signal 2.

Plank left Signal to set up Trent Radio broadcasting as Focal Radio which was bought out by local businessman Mo Chaudry from administration. Focal Radio ceased broadcasting in May 2009 after the team couldn't raise enough funds to buy out the chairman of the company who had pulled out.

Plank also broadcast on Moorlands Radio to the Staffordshire Moorlands where as well as presenting the 10 - 1 programme every weekday he was sales manager. He did considerable charity work and highlighted many political issues.

Plank died of cancer on 10 February 2011, aged 62.
