= Our Tune =

UK radio program

- Running time: Weekdays 8.40am
- Country of origin: United Kingdom
- Language(s): English
- Home station: BBC Radio 1 (c. 1979–1993); Atlantic 252 (1994); BBC 1 (1994–1995); Talk Radio (1995–1997); Smooth Radio (2011–2013); BBC Local Radio (2015)
- Hosted by: Simon Bates
- Created by: Simon Bates
- Original release: c. 14 February 1979 – 23 October 2015

Our Tune is a long-standing feature/segment on British radio presented by broadcaster Simon Bates. Having begun by at least 1979 it was originally part of his mid-morning show on BBC Radio 1, where it aired daily throughout the 1980s and early 1990s. The feature has more recently been heard on Smooth Radio, where Bates presented the Breakfast Show from 2011 to 2014. An edition of Our Tune typically features a personal story submitted by a listener together with a song that has significance to the person or situation. Many of these stories, which are read out over Nino Rota's Love Theme from Romeo and Juliet have a tragic narrative such as illness or death, although not all end on such an unhappy note.

The feature's sentimental tone has earned it criticism from some, including a columnist at Glasgow's Evening Times who once described it as "dial-a-depression". Our Tune has a huge following among the listening public. At its peak the slot was heard by 11 million listeners each day and it helped to establish Bates as a household name in the United Kingdom. Its popularity led to the release of an album of the most requested songs in 2006, and the publication of a paperback including some of the stories to mark its tenth anniversary in 1990.

Our Tune continues to be referenced in popular culture, while similar features involving listeners' stories have been employed by other presenters, including Radio 1's Mike Read and Jo Whiley. US singer Jenn Bostic became popular in Britain after Bates played one of her songs on an edition of Our Tune in 2012. According to a programme aired on Smooth Radio in 2013 to celebrate the feature's 33rd anniversary, the most requested song for Our Tune is Whitney Houston's version of I Will Always Love You. Our Tune was last aired by Smooth Radio on 27 September 2013. The feature made a brief return in October 2015 as part of a series of programmes about relationships in later life that aired on BBC Local Radio.

== History ==
Simon Bates joined BBC Radio 1 in 1976, where he presented the network's mid-morning show from 14 November 1977. He has said that the Our Tune slot first appeared on the programme on 21 July 1980, (Note: This anniversary was celebrated by Smooth Radio in 2013.) although the Radio Times makes reference to it as early as 14 February 1979. It was intended to run for a few weeks. Bates had the idea for the feature after reading a letter from one of his listeners who had enjoyed a holiday romance during a two-week trip to Bournemouth which ended after both parties returned home, and her love interest joined the armed forces. She asked Bates to play the song they had danced to during the vacation, and he read the story out one morning shortly before 11.00am. Bates then invited listeners to write to him with their personal stories and was quickly inundated with letters. He would then read these out on air. The segment quickly proved to be popular and was extended, soon becoming a regular mid-morning fixture for listeners, with people in offices, factories and schools often stopping work to hear the stories. Indeed, at its peak Our Tune attracted 11 million listeners on a daily basis. The name Our Tune was decided by listeners who would often request a song that was described by them as "our tune".

Each morning at around 11.00am, Bates would read out one of the stories while sentimental music played in the background. At first this would be any music of the genre that Bates could find, but after he played Nino Rota's theme to Franco Zeffirelli's 1968 film Romeo and Juliet this became the official music of Our Tune. The stories tended to be about relationships to begin with, but as the feature grew in popularity Bates started to receive letters on other issues. Our Tune is perhaps best remembered for those stories that had a tragic theme, typically opening with a happy courtship followed by a disaster such as illness or death. However, they were not always heart-rending tales, and many had happy conclusions. The feature would close with a song or piece of music chosen by the correspondent, usually something that had significance to those involved in the story. It might be a song that a couple had danced to at their wedding or a favourite hit enjoyed by someone who had died in tragic circumstances.

In 1982 Russell Kyle of Glasgow's Evening Times described Our Tune as "dial-a-depression". But although some bemoaned the feature's mawkish nature, Our Tune helped to establish Simon Bates as a household name in the United Kingdom. A spin-off album featuring songs chosen by listeners was released in 2006, while to celebrate ten years of Our Tune, in 1990 Arrow Books published a paperback of Our Tune stories co-authored by Simon Bates. The feature disappeared from Radio 1 after Bates resigned from the network in 1993.

== After Radio 1 ==
After leaving Radio 1 Simon Bates worked for Irish-based long wave station Atlantic 252, where he revived Our Tune, before presenting a daily version of the feature for television, on BBC1's Good Morning with Anne and Nick in 1994–95. In 1995 he took the feature to Talk Radio after signing a contract to present with the then new broadcaster. The Our Tune slot aired at 9.45am as part of his breakfast show. Our Tune later appeared on Sky One. A version titled Our Tune at Noon was syndicated to commercial radio stations across the UK.

Bates presented a one-off special of Our Tune across GCap Media stations on Valentine's Day 2006, and The Very Best of Our Tune, a CD featuring some of the most popular songs requested from the slot's Radio 1 days was released.

On 17 August 2010, it was announced that from January 2011 Simon Bates would take over as host of the Breakfast Show on Smooth Radio. Bates' show replaced local programming on a number of regional radio stations, and began on 4 January 2011. Our Tune was revived again, this time as part of the Breakfast Show, airing initially on Fridays at 8.40am. After proving popular again the feature was extended to a twice-weekly slot on Mondays and Fridays later in the year, before going daily in Spring 2012. In May 2012 Smooth Radio launched an internet discussion forum allowing listeners to share their thoughts on each day's Our Tune story. The feature celebrated its 33rd anniversary on 21 July 2013 with a special programme on Smooth Radio in which Bates played the top ten most requested "our tunes". Number one on this list was Whitney Houston's version of I Will Always Love You. Bates announced on 27 September 2013 that the feature would be going "into recess", with that morning's edition of Our Tune being the last to be aired on Smooth Radio. In February 2014 Smooth Radio announced that Bates would no longer be presenting its breakfast show, news that prompted Radio Times columnist Eddie Mair to remark light-heartedly that his final Our Tune for the station was "Kill the Director" by The Wombats. Bates was succeeded as breakfast show presenter by Andrew Castle.

After leaving Smooth Bates subsequently joined BBC Radio Devon, presenting the breakfast show from January 2015. Our Tune continues to appear. In May 2015 Bates produced a humorous version of the feature concerning the supposedly frayed relationship between England cricketer Kevin Pietersen and then newly appointed England director Andrew Strauss after Pietersen discovered he was no longer being considered for international selection. In October 2015 Our Tune made a brief return to national radio when it was aired as part of a week long feature on BBC Local Radio concerning sex and relationships in later life. The segment was included as part of the Love in Later Life series airing on Mark Forrest's evening show from 19–23 October.

== Legacy ==
The idea of reading out listeners' stories about relationships or significant life events is one that has been often used on radio, and there have been a number of similar features following the Our Tune format. However, none has endured to the same extent. In the 1980s the broadcaster Mike Read presented a similar slot during his tenure as host of The Radio 1 Breakfast Show titled First Love. Here, listeners' stories of the first time they fell in love would be read out over The Love Unlimited Orchestra's instrumental piece Love's Theme. While presenting his weeknight programme on Birmingham's BRMB in the early 1990s, Graham Torrington had a similar feature as part of his The Love Zone strand. Radio 1's The Jo Whiley Show and Fearne Cotton both had a segment called Changing Tracks where listeners were invited to email requests for a song that reminded them of a time in their life when music changed everything. The theme music from Our Tune appears in Act II of the 1998 British musical Boogie Nights. Our Tune also featured as one of the items on a 1994 edition of the BBC satirical television series Room 101. Guest Tony Slattery included it among his list of banished items.

In June 2012, Sam Wollaston of The Guardian compared the storyline from an episode of the BBC romantic drama True Love unfavourably with an edition of Our Tune, particularly as it was overlaid with sentimental music. In September 2012, The Daily Telegraph reported that a track created by users of the Poke website which remixed a speech by British Deputy Prime Minister Nick Clegg had been compared to an edition of Our Tune because of its confessional nature. The original speech was an apology for Clegg's promise to block an increase in University tuition fees before the 2010 general election, a pledge on which he later reneged as a member of the post-election coalition government. In his review of the 2013 film Labor Day, which concerns a depressed single mother living in New England, Daily Express columnist Henry Fitzherbert compared the first part of the story to an edition of Our Tune, but adds "What you never heard Bates say, however, was 'and then she met Frank...a convicted killer on the run'".

The Our Tune strand brought the US singer Jenn Bostic to the attention of listeners in the UK after Bates played her song "Jealous of the Angels" following a listener's story in 2012. The song became popular with listeners to Smooth and other radio networks, as well as on the internet. It was released as a single in December 2012 and reached number one in the UK singer-songwriter charts. In a 2008 interview with The Daily Telegraph's Lucy Cavendish, the singer Duffy recalled listening to Our Tune as a girl. She was also quoted on the topic in the Western Mail. "I spent most of my time listening to the radio and used to listen to the Our Tune slot with Simon Bates and I always cried at the end. I used to practise What Becomes of the Broken Hearted." The BBC Asian Network presenter Sonia Deol made a tongue-in-cheek reference to the feature while discussing her formative years for a 2006 interview with The Independent. "Hearing sob stories when you're 10 forces you to grow up faster, doesn't it?" A 2015 Daily Telegraph article highlighting the 50 top love songs of the 1980s described the 1985 Kool & the Gang ballad "Cherish" as a "bittersweet and surprisingly metaphysical ballad [that] must be the epitome of Simon Bates' long-lost Our Tune.".
