= Orfordness transmitting station =

Major radio broadcasting facility at Orford Ness

Orfordness
- Location within Suffolk
- Location: Orford Ness, Suffolk, England
- Coordinates: 52.1007°N 1.5728°E
- Grid reference: TM448507
- Built: 1970s

Orford Ness, Suffolk, showing locations of main sites.

The Orfordness transmitting station was a major radio broadcasting facility at Orford Ness on the Suffolk coast in the United Kingdom able to broadcast to much of Europe. It closed in May 2012 after more than 30 years of service. In 2017 Radio Caroline started broadcasting from the site, though not with the same intended coverage of an audience in Europe as the original station.

The station was designed to transmit powerful medium wave (AM) signals to much of Europe on two frequencies, 648 and 1296 kHz. Built by the British government, the facility passed through various owners after privatisation in 1997. From 2010, it was owned by a large engineering and defence services company, the Babcock International Group. The current owner of the site is a telecommunications company called Cobra Mist Limited, set up in 2015.

Over the years, the Orfordness station carried a variety of radio services. It was best known, particularly in the UK, for transmitting the BBC World Service in English around the clock on 648 kHz from September 1982 until March 2011.

The station's name is written as one word while that of the shingle spit on which it sits is two words.

== History ==
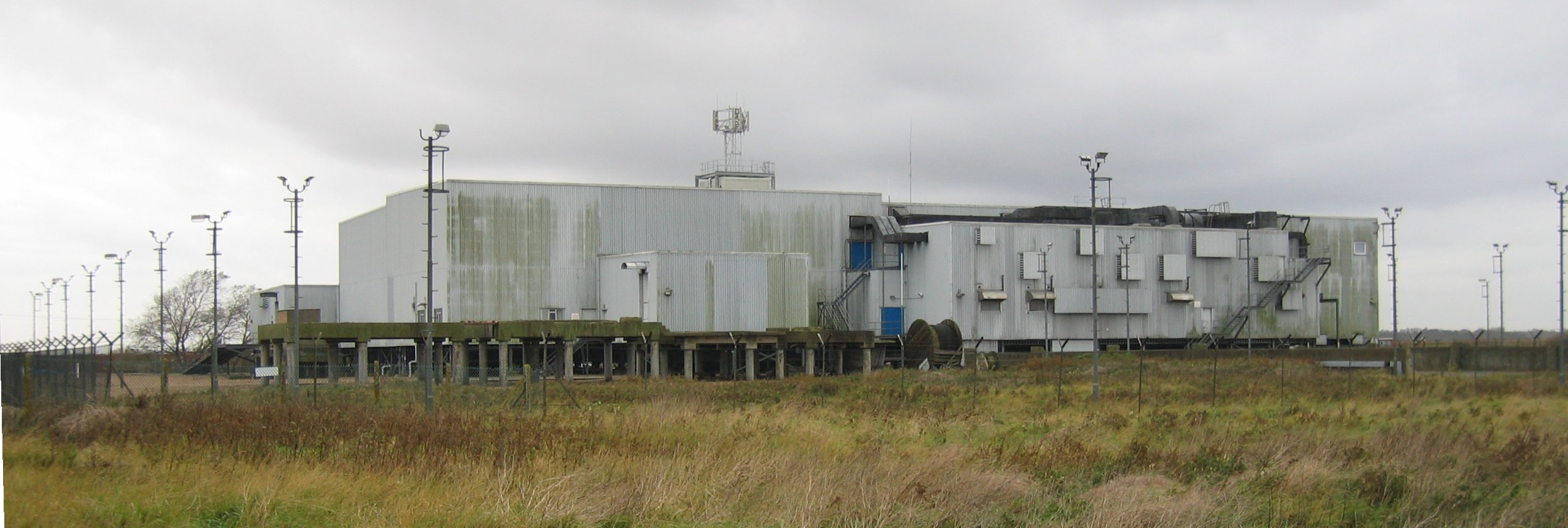
The former Cobra Mist building in October 2004

The site was originally built in the late 1960s for an experimental over-the-horizon radar station known as Cobra Mist.

The radar never worked satisfactorily and the project was scrapped in 1973. The site and buildings were taken over in 1975 by the Foreign and Commonwealth Office's Communications Engineering Department (still better known by its previous name, the Diplomatic Wireless Service), who installed a 50-kW medium-wave broadcast transmitter. Following successful tests and the installation of further transmitters, from 1978 the site shared responsibility for the BBC's medium-wave services to Europe which had been provided since the Second World War by an FCO transmitting station at Crowborough in Sussex. After the Crowborough station closed in September 1982, Orfordness handled all such BBC transmissions. In 1986, the BBC itself took over the running of the site from the FCO, although the latter retained ownership of the station.

In 1997, as part of the privatization of all transmitting stations in the UK used by the BBC, the station was bought by Merlin Communications International Ltd (usually known simply as Merlin), a company formed by former BBC engineers and frequency managers. In 2001, Merlin was acquired by VT Group plc (known as Vosper Thorneycroft until 2002) and renamed VT Merlin Communications, then just VT Communications. In 2010, VT Communications was bought by Babcock.

=== BBC transmissions ===
From September 1982, the 648 kHz channel was used to carry BBC World Service programmes in English to northern Europe. Initially, the transmitter broadcast programming in English around the clock but from 1987 and into the 1990s, the transmitter was used to carry a tailored service, branded BBC 648, in which some French and German programmes were interwoven with the main output in English. The French service closed in 1995, and the BBC's German service in 1999, and 648 reverted to being English-only.

The 1296 kHz channel, which Orfordness transmitted from 1978, was used for BBC broadcasts in east European languages during the evening and early morning. This use of 1296 was phased out after it became possible to relay the BBC on FM within the target countries, following the end of the Cold War.

=== Post BBC transmissions ===
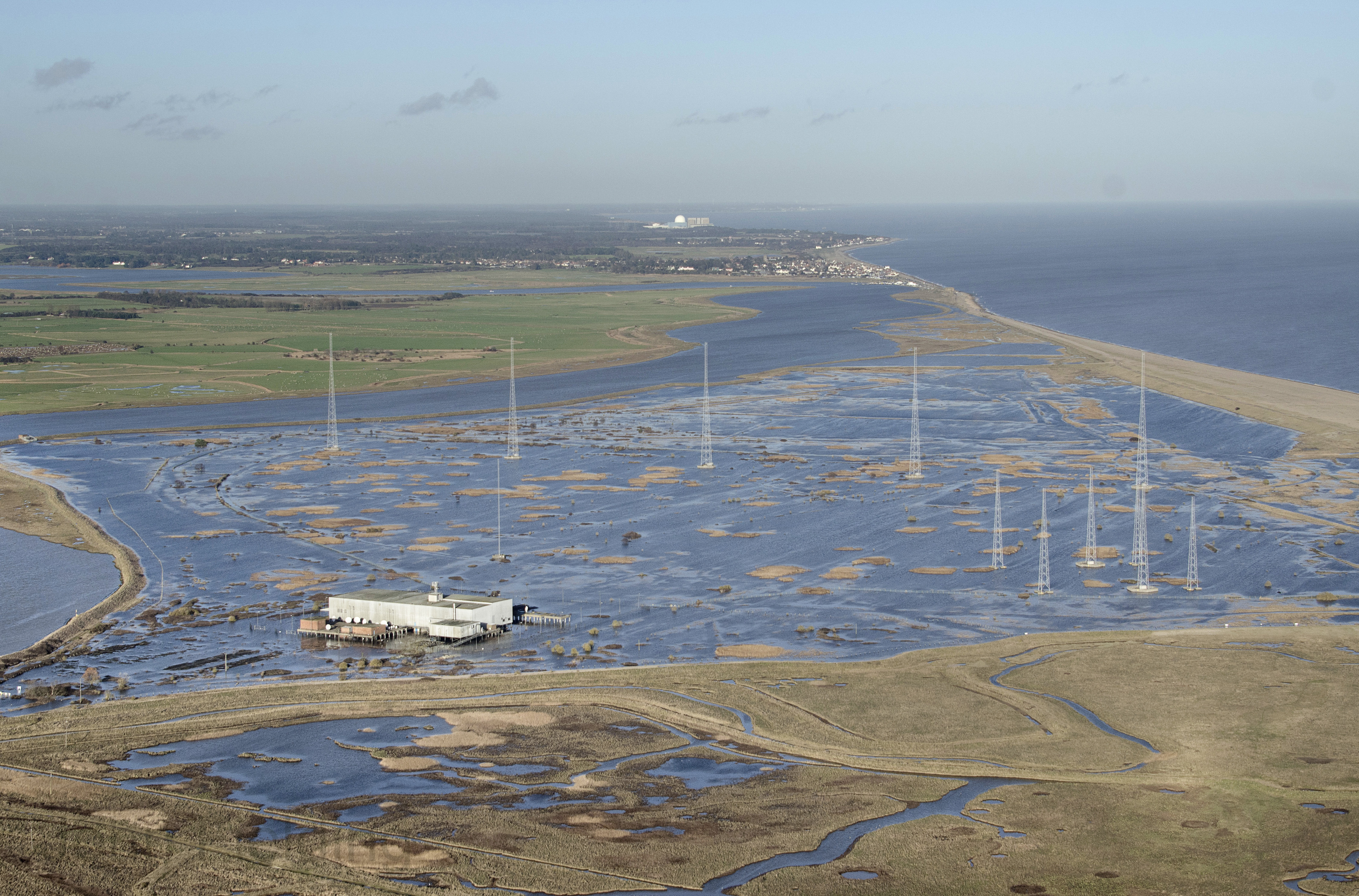
Flooding in 2014

==== 648 kHz ====
Following cuts in the BBC World Service budget, its transmissions in English on 648 from Orfordness ceased at 0000 GMT/UTC on 27 March 2011.

The 648 channel came back on the air in August and September 2011 as a temporary measure for the Dutch domestic news/information network Radio 1. This was broadcast from Orfordness following fires at the Lopik and Hoogersmilde FM transmitting sites in the Netherlands on 15 July 2011.

==== 1296 kHz ====
In July 2001, the Dutch station Radio Nationaal hired the 1296 transmitter to beam its signal to its target audience in the Netherlands and Belgium.

In 2008, an EU-funded programme in English, Network Europe, was aired on 1296 for half-an-hour a day.

Between 2003 and 2012, BBC World Service used Orfordness on 1296 kHz at limited times of the day for transmissions using the DRM digital radio system.

Radio Netherlands hired 1296 at other times of the day for analogue broadcasts in Dutch.

The final transmission from Orfordness (on either frequency) was a farewell 24-hour broadcast by Radio Netherlands on 10–11 May 2012, marking the end of its Dutch service.

== Current status of the site ==
In October 2012, the UK broadcasting regulator Ofcom withdrew Babcock’s authorisation to use 648 kHz. Notionally, therefore, Babcock still retained the right to transmit from Orfordness on the other frequency (1296 kHz). However, no further broadcasts were made.

Prior to selling the site to Cobra Mist Ltd, Babcock removed all transmitter equipment, although as of August 2016 all three aerial systems were still standing.

In May 2017, Ofcom awarded a licence for 648 kHz to Radio Caroline and Cobra Mist Ltd entered into an agreement with Radio Caroline to transmit their services on 648 kHz using the omni-directional mast (see below). Test transmissions began in November 2017 and full service commenced on 22 December 2017.

== Transmitters ==
A number of transmitters were installed on the site over the years, the most powerful being an AEG-Telefunken S4006 which had a maximum output of 600 kW. However, registration listings for both 648 and 1296 kHz always gave 500 kW as the maximum power used on both frequencies.

Transmissions on 648 kHz from the AEG-Telefunken S4006 used dynamic carrier control, an energy-saving technique in which the power of the transmitter's carrier signal is reduced when the audio level is low.

Other transmitters included two Doherty 250 kW units, designated ORF 2A and 2B (both originally at Crowborough), whose outputs could be combined to give 500 kW on a single frequency.

A DRM-capable Nautel NA200 transmitter was commissioned in 2003 and radiated digital signals on 1296 kHz. It was designated ORF 4. Although rated at 200 kW, when operating in DRM mode it generally ran with an output power of 35 kW.

The original 50 kW transmitter (a Continental Electronics type 317), installed at Orfordness in 1975 and used for the station's initial tests, was brought back into service following the major storm that hit southern England during the night of 15-16 October 1987, which cut the main electricity supply to the site.

== Aerial systems ==
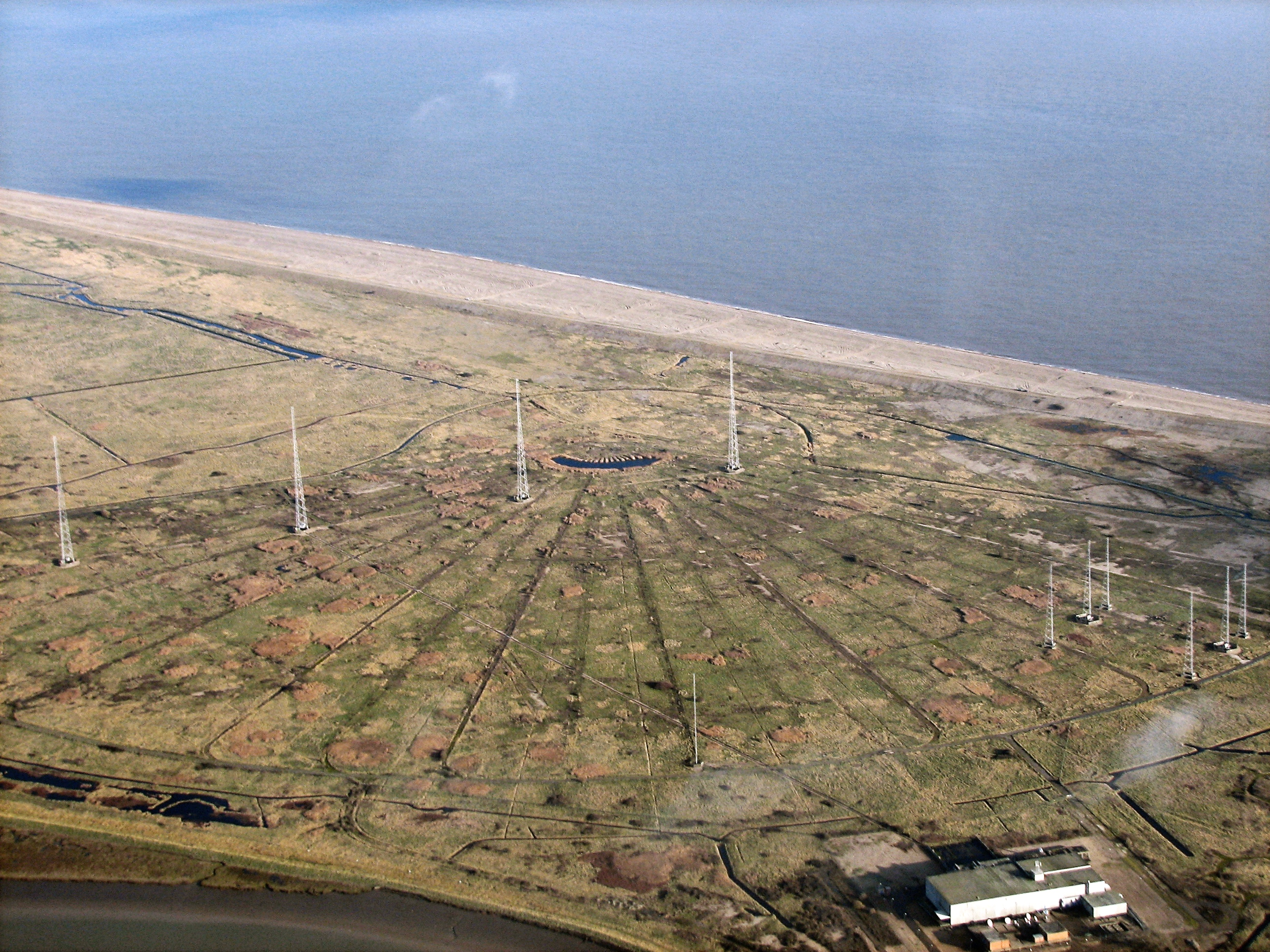
Aerials at Orfordness

The station has two directional aerial (antenna) systems: one for 648 kHz and one for 1296 kHz.

The directional aerial for 648 kHz (erected in 1981-82) consists of a row of five 106.7 metre (350 ft) freestanding steel lattice towers of triangular cross section, insulated at their base. All five towers were driven. It was beamed at 131 degrees (i.e. south-east) though for practical purposes the exact bearing was nominal as the beam was very broad towards the east and south. It provided daytime coverage of Belgium, the Netherlands, Luxembourg, north-east France and north-west Germany by ground wave propagation; and night-time coverage of much of Europe by skywave propagation.

The directional aerial for 1296 kHz (erected in 1978) consists of six freestanding steel lattice towers. Unlike the directional aerial for 648 kHz, they are arranged in two parallel rows with three towers in each. Only the middle tower of each three was driven; the other towers acted as passive reflector and director elements. It was beamed at 96 degrees (i.e. east) and was originally mainly intended for night-time (skywave) coverage of Poland, Czechoslovakia, Hungary and the western USSR, key target areas for the BBC during the Cold War. It could also be used for daytime coverage of the Netherlands and Belgium.

Both the 648 and 1296 directional aerials have limited radiation to the west, meaning that, despite the high power of the transmitters, reception of Orfordness within the UK was poor or non-existent, with the notable exception of parts of south-east England (including London) and East Anglia.

There is also a back-up omni-directional mast radiator for 648 kHz, erected in 1983, which can only handle transmitter powers of up to 250 kW and was used when maintenance work was being carried out on the directional antenna. This mast is now used to transmit Radio Caroline on 648 kHz.

== See also ==
- Radio masts and towers
- List of towers
- List of masts
- List of radio stations in the United Kingdom
- Orfordness Beacon
