= Clanabogan =

Village in County Tyrone, Northern Ireland

Coordinates: 54°34′N 7°22′W

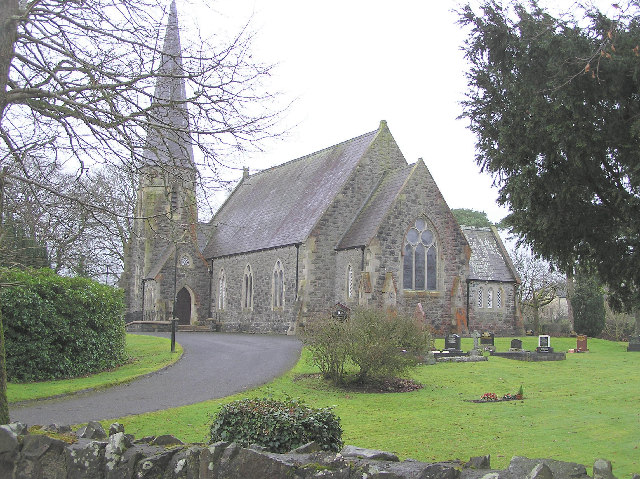
Clanabogan Church of Ireland

Clanabogan (from Irish Cluain Uí Bhogáin, meaning 'Ó Bogáin's meadow') is a small village and townland in County Tyrone, Northern Ireland. In the 2001 Census it had a population of 225 people. It lies within the Omagh District Council area.

There is an anthroposophical living and working community for people with mental handicaps, called Camphill Community Clanabogan.
