= Sounds of the 20th Century =

- Genre: Documentary
- Running time: 60 minutes
- Country of origin: United Kingdom
- Language: English
- Home station: BBC Radio 2
- Created by: Trevor Dann
- Produced by: Heather Davies, Kellie Redmond
- Original release: 7 April 2011 – 22 March 2012
- No. of episodes: 50
- Website: www.bbc.co.uk/programmes/b0103r3t

Sounds of the 20th Century is a BBC Radio 2 documentary series originally broadcast in the UK between April 2011 and April 2012. Each 60-minute programme is dedicated to one year from 1951 to 2000 and features a montage of audio relating to that year. Featuring nothing that wasn't heard, seen or read at the time, other than brief introduction to each episode by Jeremy Vine, the series does not feature any explanations, reminiscences or reflections upon the clips. Instead, the series' website provided a list and description of the audio items, which was also supplied in real time by the show's Twitter feed.

It is described as an 'audio journey through five decades of triumph, tragedy and trivia.'

The first part of the series was first broadcast at 10pm on Thursday 7 April. Focussing upon 1951, it featured the real King's Speech (as he opens the Festival of Britain), a General Election victory for the Conservatives and their Liberal allies, the first hit single with multi-tracking (Les Paul's "How High The Moon"), the first rock 'n' roll record (Jackie Brentson's "Rocket 88"), screen heroes from Marlon Brando to The Lone Ranger.

The series was produced by Trevor Dann's Company, and there is a series blog available at sottc.wordpress.com.

The critical reception was generally positive. Comparing the show to BBC One's The Rock 'n' Roll Years, The Independent's Chris Maume asked if "commissioning Sounds of the 20th Century [was] the first thing the 6 Music/Radio 2 controller Bob Shennan has got right in his short but deeply unsatisfactory tenure?". More critically, The Guardian's Elisabeth Mahoney identified parallels between the archive clips and the contemporary world, but was frustrated at the lack of a narrative, arguing that "the jaunty mix is frustratingly hard-going."

In 2021, a follow-up series aired on Radio 2 called Sounds of the 21st Century covering the years 2000 to 2010.
