= Simon Bates at Breakfast =

- Genre: Music
- Running time: Weekdays 6.00am-10.00am
- Country of origin: United Kingdom
- Language: English
- Home station: Smooth Radio
- Hosted by: Simon Bates
- Produced by: Seb Sears
- Original release: 4 January 2011 – 21 March 2014
- Audio format: FM and Digital radio
- Website: Official site

Simon Bates at Breakfast is the flagship show on Smooth Radio in the United Kingdom from January 2011 to March 2014. It was presented by Simon Bates, who took on the role of the station's breakfast show presenter on 4 January 2011, having left his long-term show at Classic FM in order to take up the position. The programme aired on weekdays from 6.00am to 10.00am, and included Our Tune and The Golden Hour, two features Bates had previously presented on BBC Radio 1. Bates occasionally took the show out on location for special editions, such as a week-long broadcast from Camp Bastion in December 2011 and the Falkland Islands in June 2012.

== History ==
In 2010 Smooth Radio had announced its intention to create a quasi-national station from its existing local stations, and on 17 August 2010 it was confirmed that Simon Bates would leave Classic FM after 13 years of broadcasting, to join Smooth Radio as its new weekday breakfast presenter from January 2011. The station went national from October, at which point Lynn Parsons became the programme's temporary presenter until Bates could take up the role. Bates, a former Radio 1 presenter, fronted his first breakfast show for Smooth on 4 January 2011, and revived some of his popular features from his Radio 1 days, which included The Golden Hour and Our Tune. The programme had a number of sponsors during its time on air, including Redspottedhanky.com, Direct Line, PG Tips, SouthAustralia.com, and Škoda Rapid. Simon Bates at Breakfast aired on the FM frequency in England, (Note: Smooth Radio Scotland had its own opt-out breakfast programme from 6.00am-9.00am presented by John McCauley and Sharon Oakley.) and nationally on DAB, as well as through Freeview, Freesat and Sky Digital.

In July 2012 Smooth Radio announced it had hired sports media specialist Jonny Gould to anchor its extended breakfast sports bulletins during the 2012 Summer Olympics. Bates and Gould had previously worked together on Talk Radio some years earlier. Gould proved to be popular with listeners and continued to present sports updates after the Olympics ended. In September 2012 the radio industry news website Radio Today reported that Bates had started to present a separate breakfast show for Smooth Radio's sister station, Smooth 70s. Smooth Radio did not publicise the show, but confirmed Bates was providing "a little content" when asked about the programme. The content was "voice tracked" from the main breakfast show.

In February 2013 Bates began playing a special daily song for Yang Guang, one of two giant pandas on loan from China to Edinburgh Zoo, after learning staff at the zoo were playing Smooth Radio to the bear in his enclosure to encourage him to mate with Tian Tian.

In February 2014 it was announced that Bates would leave Smooth Radio after 3 years of broadcasting, as the station prepared to relaunch with a new schedule in March. Bates presented his last breakfast show for Smooth on 21 March.

== Show format ==
The show began each weekday at 6.00am when Simon Bates took over from overnight presenter Derek Webster, (Note: From October 2013, Smooth introduced an Early Breakfast show that preceded Simon Bates at Breakfast. That show was presented by Nicola Bonn, and later David Andrews.) and aired for four hours until he handed over to Mark Goodier at 10.00am. (Note: From December 2012, Lynn Parsons took over Mark Goodier's show.) The programme featured music, news and talk, with very occasional on-air guests. News updates were aired half-hourly from 6.30 to 9.00, the on-the-hour updates being a full bulletin fronted by a news presenter, and the others a headline summary read by Bates. In addition, travel updates aired every 30 minutes throughout the show, and a sports news update, presented by Jonny Gould followed the 6.30, 7.30 and 8.30 summaries. The show also had a number of regular features, which included:

- Newspaper review – A summary of the day's leading headlines and stories, presented in the first hour of the show.
- The Thousand Pound Minute – A quiz where a contestant had to correctly answer ten questions in 60 seconds to win £1,000. Bates asked the questions after which his producer, Seb Sears went through any answers the listener had either got wrong or passed on. This segment was aired at 7.45am.
- Our Tune – Aired daily at 8.40am, Bates read out a personal story submitted by a listener, accompanied by a song that had significance to the person or situation.
- The Golden Hour – Featuring hits and headlines from a particular year which listeners were invited to guess via text, email or Twitter. Beginning at 9.00am there were two 30 minute sections to this, each featuring a different year. (Note: This later changed to one year.) (Note: The Golden Hour was the only part of the show to air in Scotland.)
- Film review – A summary of the week's new cinema releases, presented on Fridays at 8.10am.

Some of these features disappeared when Smooth underwent a relaunch in October 2013. The Thousand Pound Minute and Our Tune were dropped from 27 September, while changes were made to The Golden Hour a few days later.

When Bates was away on holiday the show was usually covered by another Smooth presenter. These included Lynn Parsons, Pat Sharp, Daryl Denham and David Prever. (Note: Our Tune did not air on these occasions.)

== Special editions and features ==
In September 2011 Simon Bates travelled to South Australia to broadcast a week of programmes as part of a promotion to give away a holiday to the country, while in December he visited Afghanistan for a series of shows with British troops from Camp Bastion. The programmes featured Christmas messages to loved ones from soldiers serving in Afghanistan, while Bates – who had previously presented shows from Iraq – explored the future of Afghanistan as coalition forces prepared to hand over control to the Afghan National Army. To coincide with the 30th anniversary of the end of the 1982 Falklands War Bates took the breakfast show to the Falkland Islands for a week-long series of specials in which he explored the lives and experiences of Islanders as well as reflecting on the conflict. An edition of the show was presented from the observation platform on the roof of London's O2 Arena on Friday 10 August 2012. In September 2012 two one-off editions of the show were presented from Dublin and Belfast as part of a sponsorship deal between Smooth Radio and Tourism Ireland aimed at promoting the two cities.

The programme is credited with discovering the American Country singer-songwriter Jenn Bostic after Bates played her song "Jealous of the Angels" on the show, and it became popular with listeners. The song was released as Bostic's debut single in the United Kingdom on 17 December 2012, and went on to top the UK singer-songwriter charts.
