= Simon Bates =

English radio presenter

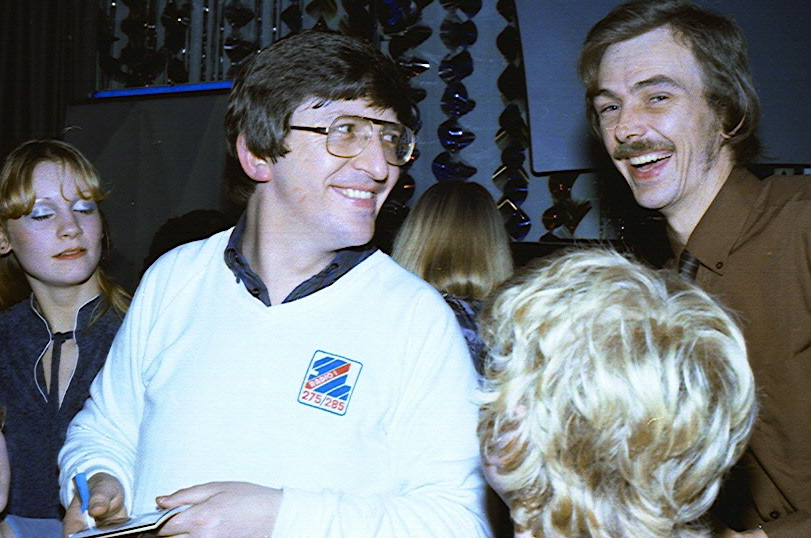
- Bates at Ossett Town Hall in West Yorkshire in the 1980s.
- Born: Simon Philip Bates; 17 December 1946 (age 79); Birmingham, England
- Occupations: DJ; TV presenter
- Years active: 1971–present

Simon Philip Bates (born 17 December 1946) is an English disc jockey and radio presenter. Between 1976 and 1993 he worked at BBC Radio 1, presenting the station's weekday mid-morning show for most of this period. He was a regular presenter of Top of the Pops from 1979 to 1988. He was the first presenter of BBC Two's Food and Drink programme in 1982.

In 1997 he became a regular presenter on Classic FM. He later hosted the breakfast show on Smooth Radio from January 2011 until March 2014, and took on the same role at BBC Radio Devon from January 2015 until January 2017. Known for his distinctive deep voice, he currently presents weekend shows in the afternoon on Boom Radio.

== Early life and career ==
Bates was raised in Suffolk and Shropshire and educated at Adams' Grammar School before working for radio stations in New Zealand and Australia. Bates returned to the UK in 1971 to join the BBC, initially working for BBC Radio 4 as a continuity announcer and newsreader and then joining BBC Radio 2 in 1972 also reading the news and announcing as well as presenting a number of music programmes including "Sounds Easy", "Sweet 'n' Swing", "Night Ride", "Late Night Extra" and, from March 1974, "The Early Show". Bates left BBC Radio 2 in January 1976 and joined BBC Radio 1 in May the same year standing in for Tom Browne to host the Sunday Top 20 show before beginning to present the Sunday morning show two months later.

== Broadcasting career ==
=== BBC Radio 1 ===
Initially a weekend presenter playing new pop records, Bates took over the weekday mid-morning programme in November 1977 and remained for 16 years, with up to 11 million listeners.

Two long-running features of his programme were The Golden Hour and Our Tune. Bates inherited The Golden Hour from Tony Blackburn. Listeners had to guess the year from records played and clues given by Bates.

Our Tune ran from 1980 at 11 am. Over Nino Rota's theme to Franco Zeffirelli's film Romeo and Juliet (1968), Bates read a sentimental story sent by a listener, ending with a record chosen by the correspondent. In "The Birthday File" Bates played music by stars celebrating a birthday.

Bates' programme featured Jonathan King to comment about music and interviewed stars at the BRIT Awards. In 1989 his summer series "Round The World" was broadcast from a different country each day. He went round the world in 67 days and raised £300,000 for Oxfam. Bates presented the Sunday afternoon Top 40 from 2 April 1978 to 26 August 1979 and from 8 January 1984 to 23 September 1984. He presented BBC TV's Top of the Pops regularly from 1979 to 1988. He presented the station's roadshow before retiring from the duties after his round-the-world trip in 1989.

When Matthew Bannister arrived to modernise Radio 1, Bates was thought to be under threat. Bannister says in The Nation's Favourite that he feared Bates's supposed subversive influence rather than his broadcasting style. Bates resigned in summer 1993 before the station could dismiss him, playing "Life Is a Rock (But the Radio Rolled Me)" by Reunion as his last record.

Bates has worked on all five analogue national BBC Radio stations. Alongside his stint at BBC Radio 1 and his broadcasts for BBC Radio 2 and BBC Radio 4, he also presented a Prom concert on BBC Radio 3 in 1987 and presented a digest of the daily papers on the original BBC Radio 5 in 1990.

=== After Radio 1 ===
After leaving Radio 1 he worked for Irish-based long wave station Atlantic 252, reviving "Our Tune" and then presented a TV version of the feature daily for BBC1's Good Morning with Anne and Nick in 1994–1995 and later for Sky One.

During these few years he also became the face of the VSC often seen before films that had come out on rental video, describing the classification of the film. This was lampooned by comedians such as Harry Enfield and Ben Elton.

From September 1995 to April 1996, Bates broadcast for Talk Radio UK (now TalkSPORT) as the breakfast show presenter. He was then heard on London's Liberty Radio as a mid-morning presenter until 1997.

Bates joined Classic FM in 1997. He was also heard on BBC Southern Counties Radio presenting a Sunday morning show until late 1998. In addition, between 1996 and 1998, Bates presented a show on the Classic Gold Network on weekday evenings. He then moved to London's LBC as breakfast host from 1999 to 2002.

=== Classic FM ===
Bates began presenting the weekly Classic Romance show in 1997 on Classic FM. In mid-2002 he was offered his first daily slot, presenting the drivetime show. From June 2003 he hosted the Classic FM weekday breakfast show and the one-hour "Classic FM at the Movies" programme, discussing films and film music on Sunday evening. In September 2006, his programme's hours changed from 7:00 a.m. – 11:00 a.m. to 8 a.m. – noon. In 2010 Bates was moved to mid morning (9:00 a.m. to 1:00 p.m.) and shortly afterwards it was announced he left the station in January 2011 to present a show on Smooth Radio.

=== Gold ===
As well as his daily show for Classic FM, Bates could also be heard on the Gold Radio Network every Sunday morning from 8:00 a.m. to noon.

=== Smooth Radio ===
On 17 August 2010, it was announced that from January 2011 Simon Bates would take over as host of the Breakfast Show on Smooth Radio, leaving Classic FM after 13 years of broadcasting. Bates' show replaced local programming on a number of regional radio stations and began on 4 January 2011, except for Scottish stations which continued with locally produced shows. He brought back both The Golden Hour and Our Tune to the show. "The Golden Hour" aired every day from 9 am to 10 am as it did originally, while Our Tune aired each morning at 8:40 am. Other features in the show included the Thousand Pound Minute, where listeners needed to answer ten questions correctly within 60 seconds to win £1,000.

In September 2012 the radio industry news website Radio Today reported that Bates had started to present a separate breakfast show for Smooth Radio's sister station, Smooth 70s. Smooth Radio did not publicise the show, but confirmed Bates was providing "a little content" when asked about the programme. The content was "voice tracked" from the main breakfast show.

Bates left Smooth Radio on 21 March 2014.

=== BBC Radio Devon ===
Bates, who as of 2014 lived on a farm in mid-Devon, started hosting the BBC Radio Devon breakfast show from 6:30 a.m. to 10:00 a.m. on weekdays from 12 January 2015. He also featured the Golden Hour from 9:00 a.m. to 10:00 a.m.; the years ranged from 1956 to 2004.

=== 2017–present ===
Bates left BBC Radio Devon on 8 January 2017 to "move on to other things." Gordon Sparks took over the breakfast show.

On 2 October 2017, Bates participated in Radio 1 Vintage, doing an interview about his time on BBC Radio 1.

In 2020, Bates was hired to do the voice over for Channel 5's weekly countdown of the 30 biggest selling singles of one year in the UK (known under a number of titles such as Britains Favourite 80s Songs, The 90s Greatest Hits 1990–1999, Britain's Biggest 90s Hits and Britain's Favourite 90s Songs).

Bates was a regular contributor for CBS News's London Calling segment until 2022.

in August 2023, Boom Radio announced that Bates would be joining and presenting a regular Sunday afternoon show between 2:00 p.m. – 4:00 p.m. In October 2023 he also began presenting a Saturday afternoon show on Boom Radio, featuring hits from the 1970s between 12:00 p.m. – 2:00 p.m.

== Personal life ==
Bates and his wife enjoy travelling. His daughter lives in Melbourne. Bates has spoken of his passion for horses, and his keen interest in British history.

He has said that some of his favourite music artists are Gordon Lightfoot, Ella Fitzgerald, Bob Dylan, Billy Joel and Elton John.

Media offices
Preceded by Tom Browne	BBC Radio 1 chart show presenter 2 April 1978 – 26 August 1979	Succeeded by Tony Blackburn
Preceded by Tommy Vance	BBC Radio 1 chart show presenter 8 January 1984 – 23 September 1984	Succeeded by Richard Skinner
