= Timeline of Capital Radio =

This is a timeline of Capital London, previously known as Capital Radio, 95.8 Capital FM or similar variations, from its initial period as an Independent Local Radio station for Greater London to the present day CHR network serving most of the UK.

== 1970s ==
- 1970
  - Capital Radio is formed in early 1970 by Nicholas Vincent-Brown, David Maule-ffinch and one other friend Tony Parmiter with the intent to apply for London's Independent Local Radio general entertainment licence. In late 1970, future brothers-in-law Vincent-Brown and Maule-ffinch's father-in-law, Barclay Barclay-White, become involved. By the time the consortium applies to the IBA, Capital Radio's board also includes Richard Attenborough, George Martin, Bryan Forbes and Peter Saunders (impresario).
- 1973
  - February – Capital Radio is awarded the licence to provide London's general entertainment service. Michael Bukht is appointed programme controller, Aidan Day Head of Music and Ron Onions Head of News. The chief engineer is Gerry O'Reilly.
  - 16 October – At 5am, Capital Radio begins broadcasting a music-based general entertainment service to the London area. Launching eight days after the news and information service of LBC, Capital becomes the UK's second Independent Local Radio station. It broadcasts on 95.8MHz from the Croydon transmitter and 557kHz (539m) MW from London Transport's Lots Road Power Station, Chelsea. The medium-wave frequency and location were temporary sites as the then new high-powered medium-wave station at Saffron Green, Barnet, was incomplete. Bridge over Troubled Water by Simon & Garfunkel is the first record to be played on the station. Launch presenters include Kenny Everett, Tommy Vance, David Symonds, Roger Scott, Dave Cash, Joan Shenton, Monty Modlyn, Tony Myatt, Nicky Horne, Robin Houston, Allan Hargreaves, Marsha Hunt, Tim Rice, Susan Stranks, Brian Rust, Robin Ray, Kerry Juby, Gerald Harper, Humphrey Burton, Simon Jenkins, Simon Prebble, Sue Denny, Sarah Ward, Don Blake, Sean Kelly, and Tricia Ingrams.
- 1974
  - January – The station changes its music policy following a slow start, moving away from light music to a more pop-based format.
  - Kenny Everett hosts the flagship breakfast show.
  - 2 September – Michael Aspel joins the station to host the weekday mid-morning programme from 9am–12pm.
  - November
    - Capital closes its in-house newsroom for financial reasons. 12 people are made redundant.
    - Robin Houston and Tricia Ingrams leave and join LBC.
- 1975
  - The IBA finally opens the station's permanent transmission facilities at Saffron Green which allows both LBC and Capital Radio to move up the dial. Capital moves to 1548kHz medium wave (194 m).
  - May – Graham Dene replaces Kenny Everett as presenter of the breakfast show, as Kenny himself moves to weekends and Rod McKenzie joins the station.
- 1976
  - December – Capital Radio launches the Capital Radio Helpline – a joint partnership with BT, Thames Television and LWT.
  - Capital Radio launches the Flying Eye, a traffic spotting light aircraft, carrying live reports on traffic congestion on the streets of Central London.
- 1977
  - No events.
- 1978
  - June – Mike Smith joins.
  - November – Launch presenter Tommy Vance leaves the station to rejoin BBC Radio 1.
- 1979
  - 31 December – Alan Freeman joins, marking his debut by hosting The Top 40 of the 70s.

== 1980s ==
- 1980
  - 7 January – Alan Freeman revives The Rock Show, a show he previously presented on BBC Radio 1.
  - July – Mike Smith takes over as presenter of the breakfast show.
  - August – Richard Allinson joins the station to present Capital's weekly Top 30 chart show.
  - September – Kenny Everett leaves the station for a while to join BBC Radio 2.
- 1981
  - No events.
- 1982
  - 13 March – Pick of the Pops, a show that Alan Freeman previously presented on BBC Radio 1, is revived by Freeman as Pick of the Pops Take Two.
  - Mike Smith leaves the station to rejoin BBC Radio 1. His replacement presenter of the breakfast show is Graham Dene.
- 1983
  - No events.
- 1984
  - Chris Tarrant joins the station to present a Sunday lunchtime show, before later moving to a late morning slot on weekdays.
  - June – Kenny Everett rejoins the station, reviving his Saturday lunchtime show.
  - 30 September – The first edition of The Network Chart Show is broadcast. Aired on almost all of the UK's Independent Local Radio network, the programme is presented from Capital's Euston Tower studios by David Jensen who joins the station to present it and to take over as host of the station's mid-morning show.
  - October – Mike Allen launches the influential hip-hop show.
  - 30 December – Michael Aspel leaves. He had been presenting a short-lived Sunday show after ending his long-running mid-morning programme on 27 July.
  - Rod McKenzie leaves the station to join BBC Radio 1.
- 1985
  - No events.
- 1986
  - 4 May – As part of an IBA experiment in split broadcasting on Independent Local Radio, Capital runs a Sunday daytime service called CFM, broadcasting a more contemporary mix of music than normally broadcast by the station.
  - Nicky Campbell joins.
- 1987
  - 2 March – Chris Tarrant takes over as host of the breakfast show.
  - July – The hip-hop show ends as Mike Allen moves to LBC.
  - September – Neil Fox, Lynn Parsons, Tim Westwood, and Jackie Brambles join, and Nicky Campbell leaves the station to join BBC Radio 1. These presenter changes take place after new programme controller Richard Park oversees an overhaul of Capital's output from a full-service station to a music-intensive CHR format, which proves highly successful. The revamp is underlined by a new on-air imaging package, known as 'Music Power'.
- 1988
  - Jackie Brambles leaves the station to join BBC Radio 1.
  - June – Roger Scott leaves the station to join BBC Radio 1. He had been at the station since its launch 15 years earlier.
  - 2 July – At 7am, Tony Blackburn launches Capital Gold on Capital's MW frequency. The station initially broadcasts only at the weekend. Other launch presenters include Paul Burnett, Paul Gambaccini, and Kenny Everett.
  - 1 November – Capital Gold begins full-time broadcasting. The FM service is renamed as Capital FM.
  - December – Alan Freeman leaves for a while to rejoin BBC Radio 1. This signals the end of Pick of the Pops Take Two
  - Pete Tong joins to present a weekly dance music show.
- 1989
  - No events.

== 1990s ==
- 1990
  - Paul Gambaccini leaves the station to rejoin BBC Radio 1.
  - Clive Warren joins, presenting an overnight slot as well as covering other shows. He would later present the early weekend morning show and also the weekday overnight slots.
- 1991
  - Lynn Parsons and Pete Tong both leave the station to join BBC Radio 1, and Mike Read joins.
- 1992
  - No events.
- 1993
  - Capital Radio Group buys BRMB.
- 1994
  - Capital Radio Group buys Southern Radio Group.
  - April – Alan Freeman rejoins the station to revive Pick of the Pops on Capital Gold. The programme is called Pick Of The Pops – Take Three.
  - Launch presenter Dave Cash leaves the station after 21 years of broadcasting.
  - Clive Warren leaves the station to join BBC Radio 1.
  - Kenny Everett hosts his final show for the station, and leaves due to ill health. He died the following year.
  - December – Tim Westwood leaves the station for a while to join BBC Radio 1.
- 1995
  - Mike Read leaves and Caroline Feraday joins.
- 1996
  - September – Capital launches its website.
  - October – Long-running news programme The Way It Is ends.
  - Chris Moyles joins.
- 1997
  - July – Chris Moyles leaves the station to join BBC Radio 1.
  - Capital leaves its Euston Tower studios and moves to new headquarters in Leicester Square.
  - Steve Penk joins the station to host the mid-morning show.
  - Richard Allinson and Alan Freeman both leave the station to join BBC Radio 2.
- 1998
  - Capital Gold Birmingham replaces Xtra AM.
  - 1 June – Capital Gold launches in the south, replacing South Coast Radio.
- 1999
  - Following the company's purchase of Red Dragon FM and its medium wave service Touch Radio in South Wales, Capital Gold replaces Touch Radio.
  - 15 November – Life launches on the new Digital One national multiplex.

== 2000s ==
- 2000
  - May – Capital Radio buys Border Radio Holdings, thereby acquiring the three Century radio stations and Border Television, which is subsequently sold to Granada.
- 2001
  - After fourteen years overseeing output, Richard Park leaves the station to start a consultancy firm.
  - Edith Bowman joins, and hosts her first Hit Music Sunday show with Cat Deeley.
  - Caroline Feraday leaves.
- 2002
  - The Capital Gold network relaunches with the new slogan of ‘’The Greatest Hits of the 60s, 70s and 80s.’’
  - Chris Brooks joins the station to host a new Weekend Breakfast Show.
  - After two years at Virgin Radio, Steve Penk rejoins to present a networked late evening show. However, he only stays for a short period returning to Key 103 in Manchester in the New Year.
  - Edith Bowman leaves the station to join BBC Radio 1.
  - Tony Blackburn leaves.
- 2003
  - December – Martin Collins leaves the station after 20 years of broadcasting.
- 2004
  - 2 April – After 20 years of broadcasting, including 17 years hosting its flagship breakfast show, Chris Tarrant leaves.
  - 5 April – Johnny Vaughan replaces Chris Tarrant as host of the breakfast show. Initially, the show's weekly RAJAR ratings fall from 1.3 million to 980,000 listeners.
  - 5 September – Jeremy Kyle joins the station to present a weeknight late evening show Capital Confessions.
- 2005
  - 1 March – Neil Fox leaves.
  - May – Capital Radio Group and GWR Group merge to form GCap Media.
  - DAB station Life is relaunched as Capital Life with a full presenter line-up. The station had dropped presenters outside breakfast in the New Year.
  - December – In an attempt to win back listeners, shorter commercial breaks (two adverts per break) are introduced, although there are more as a result. The policy is dropped after a few months.
- 2006
  - 9 January – Capital is relaunched under its original name Capital Radio, with a modified line-up of presenters and a slightly tweaked music format.
  - September – Following an unsuccessful relaunch in January, a new programme controller, Scott Muller joins from the Nova group in Australia, and the station sees another tweak in style and brands itself as "London's Hit Music Station".
  - December – Jeremy Kyle leaves the station to rejoin ITV.
- 2007
  - Dave Berry joins the station, presenting the Saturday afternoon show.
  - 12 March – The station is rebranded once again as Capital 95.8 – together with a new slogan, The Sound of London.
  - 3 August – All stations in the Classic Gold and Capital Gold networks are replaced by a new network called simply Gold, the result of the merger of the Classic Gold and Capital Gold networks under one owner, GCap Media.
  - 10 December – Capital 95.8 slips down to fourth in the listening charts in London. London's Hit Music Network is reintroduced as the slogan and Greg Burns becomes drivetime presenter. Lucio moves to the evening show, replacing the departing Bam Bam.
- 2008
  - 4 February – Denise van Outen joins former The Big Breakfast colleague Johnny Vaughan as co-host of its breakfast show. However, she would leave after just six months of broadcasting on 29 July, midway through her contract.
  - 31 March
    - DAB station Capital Life closes.
    - Global Radio agrees to purchase Capital's owners GCap Media for £375million.
  - 29 July – Denise van Outen leaves.
  - August – Lisa Snowdon replaces Denise van Outen as breakfast co-presenter, as Lisa herself joins the station.
  - October – Capital's flagship breakfast show becomes the most popular breakfast show in London with a weekly audience of 862,000 listeners.
  - 31 October – Global Radio officially takes control of all GCap Media and its brands, giving it ownership of The One Network. The GCap Media name is dropped at this time.
- 2009
  - Chris Brooks leaves the station.

== 2010s ==
- 2010
  - 13 September – Global announces plans to scrap the Galaxy Network in order to create a nationwide Capital FM. The plans will also include the closure of four further stations, with the new network going live in early 2011.
  - David Jensen leaves.
- 2011
  - 3 January
    - Capital FM launches nationally, with Capital 95.8 FM rebranding as Capital London, a part of The Capital FM Network as part of a merger of Global Radio's Hit Music and Galaxy networks to form the nine-station 'Capital Network'. Other than daily breakfast and weekday drivetime shows, the majority of Capital's London-based output is now networked.
    - Three local stations in the East Midlands – Trent FM, Leicester Sound and Ram FM – merge to form a regional Capital station, Capital East Midlands.
  - 1 July – Global Radio requests changes to the formats of Capital Birmingham and Capital Scotland, which had inherited obligations from previous owners. This was to enable format consistency within all nine Capital stations. On 17 November 2011, Ofcom approved both format change requests.
  - 18 November – After more than seven years hosting the London breakfast show, Johnny Vaughan abruptly leaves Capital. The show's audience had increased to over a million listeners.
- 2012
  - 3 January – Weekend breakfast presenter Dave Berry replaces Johnny Vaughan as the main weekday host of Capital Breakfast.
  - 12 October – Global launches Capital TV on Freesat and Sky.
- 2013
  - 8 March – Capital London hires former BBC Radio 1 journalist Dominic Byrne to work on Capital Breakfast with presenters Dave Berry and Lisa Snowdon.
  - 7 October – Capital XTRA launches. It is a rebrand of urban music station Choice FM, broadcasting on FM in London on 96.9 and 107.1 MHz and nationally on the Digital One DAB multiplex and among the presenters is Tim Westwood who rejoins the station.
- 2014
  - 6 February – Global Radio announces it will sell two Capital stations – in Scotland and South Wales – to Communicorp. Capital's network programming and brand name is still used by both stations under contract.
  - 6 May – Two Capital stations launch in North Wales – Capital Cymru, a bilingual station serving Anglesey and Gwynedd, and Capital North West and Wales, serving the rest of the region, as well as Cheshire and the Wirral. These stations replace Heart, which launches on the former Real Radio stations in North and Mid Wales and the North West of England.
- 2015
  - 13 November – Lisa Snowdon announces her departure from Capital Breakfast and the station at the end of the year. She was the programme's co-host since August 2008.
  - 18 December – Lisa Snowdon leaves.
- 2016
  - 18 January – Following Global Radio's purchase of Liverpool station Juice 107.6, the station is relaunched as Capital Liverpool.
- 2017
  - April – Dave Berry leaves Capital Breakfast and the station after five years of broadcasting, to join Absolute Radio.
  - May – Roman Kemp replaces Dave Berry as the new presenter of Capital Breakfast in London, alongside Vick Hope and Sonny Jay. Kemp also presents a networked Capital Breakfast show on Saturday mornings.
- 2018
  - 2 August – After Global's purchase of Brighton and Hove station Juice 107.2 earlier in the year, Global announces the service will be relaunched as Capital Brighton from 3 September.
  - 11 October – After six years on air, Capital TV ceases broadcasting.
- 2019
  - 26 February – Following further deregulation, Global Radio announces plans to replace the local breakfast shows on Capital, Heart and Smooth with a single national breakfast show for each network. Local weekend output is also axed.
  - 5 April – The final editions of Capital's local breakfast shows air. Two stations in Brighton and the East Midlands cease broadcasting.
  - 8 April
    - Capital London's breakfast show goes national, replacing most of the network's local breakfast shows, except for Capital Cymru, which also retains local programming at weekends. All Capital stations continue to air weekday Drivetime shows, local news bulletins and traffic updates.
    - Six stations, including 2BR in Lancashire, are merged into three stations in the North West, the Midlands and the south of England.
  - 23 May – Capital Cymru drops all networked programming and launches a full 24-hour schedule of local output, including additional Welsh language daytime shows and an automated off-peak service of bilingual music. The station continues to air Global's The Official Big Top 40 on Sundays.
  - 2 September – Capital XTRA Reloaded launches as a full-time station.
  - 2 December – Capital becomes available on FM in the south east Midlands when it replaces six local stations owned by Quidem. The six stations operate as a single network called Capital Mid Counties, sharing all programmes with the Capital network apart from a local weekday drivetime show.

== 2020s ==
- 2020
  - 21 February – Vick Hope leaves Capital Breakfast, and the station ten months after the London-based show went national.
  - 23 March – Sian Welby joins the station to replace Vick Hope on Capital Breakfast.
  - 1 October – Capital Dance launches with MistaJam presenting the drivetime show from Tuesdays to Saturdays.
- 2021
  - 18 August – Capital Lancashire moves its Chorley relay from 96.3 FM to 102.8 FM.
- 2022
  - 20 May – Capital Xtra Reloaded is removed from Digital One to make room for Heart 00s. It continues to be available via DAB+ in London only.
  - 10 October – Chris Stark joins Capital Breakfast to present alongside Roman Kemp, Sian Welby and Sonny Jay, while Rio Fredrika takes over mid-mornings. Stark also becomes Creative Executive Producer.
  - 24 October – Capital Xtra Reloaded returns to national digital radio, having secured a new DAB+ slot on the Sound Digital multiplex.
  - 2 November – Capital rebrands their stations to no longer use the words FM as part of their name.
- 2023
  - 13 February – Capital Chill launches on the Sound Digital multiplex, and becomes the fifth Capital-branded station.
  - 11 April – Global Radio announces plans to relaunch local programming on Capital Scotland.
  - 2 May – Local programming launches on Capital Scotland. Fat Brestovci & Tallia Storm host Capital Scotland Breakfast. Robyn Richford hosts mid-mornings across Scotland with Ryan Borthwick joining to host Scotland's afternoon show. Capital Scotland's Katy J retains her drivetime show.
  - 18 May – Global Radio have signed a deal with ITV to show highlights of the Capital Summertime Ball and Capital Jingle Bell Ball.
  - 8 July – Global Radio launches its "Play Capital" ad campaign on television, social media and outdoors, and featuring artists including Ed Sheeran, Tom Grennan, Dua Lipa and Leigh-Anne Pinnock.
- 2024
  - 28 March – Roman Kemp presents Capital Breakfast for the final time, leaving after a decade presenting on the Capital network.
  - 8 April – Jordan North succeeds Roman Kemp as the new host of Capital Breakfast.
  - 12 September – Global launches a new spin-off station Capital Anthems. It broadcasts on the semi-national Sound Digital multiplex.
- 2025
  - 21 February – Capital stations in England end all local and regional programming.
  - 24 February – Will Manning begins hosting the show that was previously non-networked - Capital Drive.
