= Neil Spence =

David Neil Spence (1931–2007) was a British pirate radio broadcaster of the 1960s and an educator of the 1970s and 1980s, with a fine ability to spot and develop radio broadcasting talent. As Dave Dennis, from 1964 to 1966 he was the "Double D", the fastest-talking and highest-rated DJ on Radio London, operating from the pirate ship MV Galaxy and broadcasting alongside future household names such as Kenny Everett and Tony Blackburn. As Neil Spence, from 1968 to 1985 he oversaw the early radio careers of James Whale, Roger Scott, Adrian Love, Graham Dene, Jeremy Vine and Dale Winton, among many others who would reach the top of the UK broadcasting industry.

== Early years ==
Spence was educated at Leighton Park School in Reading, Berkshire, a highly academic school where he was boasted he was not just bottom of his class but of the whole school. He left school to work in farming and stayed for eight years, by which time he was the manager of the farm and claimed on-air to be an authority on pigs. He attended the prestigious Central School of Speech and Drama in London for a three-year acting course, and then spent time in English repertory theatre.

== Radio presenting career ==
Spence began his radio presenting career with the pirate station Radio Atlanta, which began broadcasting in May 1964 from the motor vessel MV Mi Amigo off the east coast of the UK. When Radio Atlanta was taken over by Radio Caroline in July 1964, Spence resigned and left the station. At some point that year he worked briefly as a DJ at Radio City, which broadcast from an old army fort at Shivering Sands in the Thames Estuary. A short time later he was as at Radio Invicta, a "sweet music station" which broadcast from a second world war fort at Red Sands, near Whitstable in Kent.

Late in 1964 a demo tape won Spence a lunchtime spot on Radio London, which was due to begin broadcasting in December that year from the motor vessel MV Galaxy. Along with the other launch presenters he adopted a new on-air name, Dave Dennis. Among his early colleagues were Earl Richmond, Kenny Everett, Dave Cash, and senior DJ Tony Windsor, who had been with Spence at Radio Atlanta. Later arrivals included Tony Blackburn.

The station was ground-breaking for UK pirate radio, in that unlike its major rival Radio Caroline it used a tight American top-40 format. "Caroline had always been what I call catch-as-catch-can radio," said Dave Cash: "You used to go out there with a bunch of records and play them. No one had any idea what order they were in. No one had any idea of format at all."

After a shaky start, Spence became comfortable with the Radio London format and quickly established his lunchtime show as the most popular on the station, working live for three hours a day, often in rough seas where gramophone needles skipped across vinyl records, and with blankets to deaden the echo from the steel walls of the studio. His ratings could not be put down to formatting or music choice alone, as every DJ followed a similar tight format, based on the Dallas station KLIF. It was almost unheard of for a lunchtime radio show on any station to be a bigger draw than the breakfast show. An eventful two years saw Spence in his fast-talking persona of Dave Dennis keep his lunchtime show at the top of the station's ratings despite later competition from a wildly comedic teatime show presented by Kenny Everett and Dave Cash.

In April 1966 Spence took his holiday in New York, where he was influenced by the high-pressure presentation style of DJs such as Bruce Morrow and Jack Spector, and the formatting skills of WABC's Rick Sklar and WMCA's Ruth Meyer with her team-radio approach to presentation known as the 'Good Guys.'

Spence quit Radio London in December 1966. His parting shot was a hit single which reached number 19 in the station's own chart, featuring his sickly-sweet reading to music of a Victorian newspaper editorial, 'Yes, Virginia', reassuring a young girl that Santa Claus did indeed exist. He went to live in Southern Ireland with Jo Spence, then a photographer's assistant and later a pioneering feminist photographer of the 1970s and eighties, who changed her name to his by deed poll.

== Radio programming career ==
Radio London closed down in 1967 with the introduction of the Marine Broadcasting Offences Act 1967, and BBC Radio 1 began broadcasting the same year. On his return to England, Spence began making jingles and trails for Radio 1, where many of his pirate radio contemporaries were forging on-air DJ careers. Kenny Everett in his first BBC broadcast in May 1967 jokingly named the Double-D as one of his "best friendships." Spence later said he had worked for all four BBC Radio networks, including the classical station BBC Radio 3 and the speech based BBC Radio 4.

In 1970, he was appointed the first programme controller of the United Biscuits Network, UBN, a station which began broadcasting by landline to two of the UK factories of United Biscuits in September that year. The aim of the station was to keep workers entertained and productive, reducing staff turnover and absenteeism while providing safety and hygiene information. A year later UB chairman Hector Laing announced the station was achieving its objectives despite many doubters, and would expand to other factories. Spence told the Financial Times with some justification that the station's quality equaled BBC Radio 1 and was "a great sound." Spence developed a station which provided a top-40 format during the day, a middle-of-the-road MOR format in the evening, and a soul, blues and reggae format at night.

Spence also gained a reputation for talent spotting, and for developing the careers of DJs, who frequently moved on to regular broadcast stations. Among those whose early careers he helped to forge were Graham Dene, who he discovered in the BBC Gramophone Library, Adrian Love, and Roger Scott. As Independent Local Radio (ILR) began to expand, many UBN presenters left to work at the new stations. In 1977 Spence himself moved to ILR, taking over as programme controller at Radio Trent from former UBN presenter Bob Snyder. At Trent, Spence developed formats to appeal to a broad local audience, and continued to find and develop new talent. Among his hires there was Dale Winton, another DJ who had been at UBN.

== Radio training career ==
Spence's first training job was in the late 1960s at the "London Broadcasting School" run by his ex-colleague Earl Richmond. Among his first trainees was James Whale. Spence developed a strong commitment to training and development during his years at UBN and Radio Trent, and that, together with his ability to talent spot, led Michael Bukht, then programme controller at Capital Radio, to ask him in 1980 to join the newly established National Broadcasting School as head of programming.

From 1980 to 1985, Spence led intensive three-month courses to train music radio presenters. The school's aim was to develop talent for ILR, but many also went on to work for the BBC and in television as well as overseas, including in pirate radio. Alumni from his presentation courses included BBC presenter Jeremy Vine John Leech and the musician Mikey Dread. When the school closed in 1985, it appears Spence refused offers of work and was believed to have returned to farming. He resisted all invitations from former colleagues to attend reunions, particularly those from his pirate radio days. He died in Lincolnshire in 2007.

== Presentation style ==
When the founders of Radio Atlanta had discussed where to find suitable voices for a commercial station broadcasting to the UK, they concluded that no British broadcasters were capable of the task as they were so firmly rooted in the BBC style. However, they took Spence on, together with a number of DJs well-versed in commercial broadcasting in Australia. Surviving recordings give a flavour of Spence's conventional and actorly British delivery. Although formal by comparison to US and Australian commercial stations, his style was far more relaxed than the BBC of the time.

Moving to Radio Invicta, Spence maintained his actor-DJ style. However, by the time he arrived at Radio London in late 1964 his performance was still considered "stuffy" by senior DJ Tony Windsor and programme director Ben Toney. Windsor was tasked with turning Neil Spence the announcer and presenter into Dave Dennis the DJ, and was asked by Toney to "break in" Spence and "give him a few tips on how to present a proper deejay show." Spence, who had grown up with little else to listen to except the BBC, responded poorly to Windsor's direction. "In the end I could tell he was about to drive Dave around the bend," said Toney, who then asked Spence to use his acting training and in effect to create "Dave Dennis, the Double-D" as a character to be played on air.

Toney was using off-air tapes of the Dallas top-40 station KLIF as a formatting aid for Radio London, and instructed Spence to listen to them carefully. "I then told him that if he were any kind of actor, he would be able to create the style of programming recorded on the tapes. As it turned out, Dave went from being a stuffy announcer to a top-notch deejay in a matter of weeks," said Toney. Toney later said that of all the DJs he encouraged towards the new style of British commercial broadcasting, Spence "made the greatest amount of progress of them all." As new voices came on board, Spence the actor-DJ resolutely maintained the Dave Dennis character, catchphrases and all, in the face of a rising tide of ever more elaborate jokes aimed against him.

His cabin mate Kenny Everett began the trend by making on-air references to his smelly feet and terrible temper. As the comedy became more sophisticated, Spence found himself on air with Everett having been invited to recite the weirdly obscure lyrics of the song "Along Comes Mary" by The Association in his best actorly voice. After the words of the final chorus, "When we met I was sure out to lunch, Now my empty cup tastes as sweet as the punch," Everett announced: "That was "Along Comes Mary", ladies and gentlemen, as Dave Dennis crawls out of the studio on his knees." Everett told his audience that Spence deserved an OBE for his performance.

Recordings of Spence's lunchtime programme as Dave Dennis show his own humour breaking through his former style, as he combines a rich British-accented voice with an irreverent approach which slyly and then more confidently sends up the BBC announcers of the day, with the speed of his delivery matching the rhythm of the music he plays and his theme tune 'Go Mean' by Ruffle.

In April 1966, Spence spent his holiday from Radio London in New York, where his reputation gave him access top radio DJs and programmers. On his return, his presentation style was even faster than before, as if to eliminate any possibility of dead air, and his microphone technique was adapted to cut through mush by making maximum use of the station's transmitter power. "DD's on-air style became machinegun-like with the volume at+3dB," said fellow London Radio DJ Duncan Johnson. "I made a comment and he said the top man in New York says you have to push the compressor to hold the listener. I didn't bother to ask why."

Spence's later on-air style remained contemporary and continued to hold the large audience he had built. "Dave Dennis swings," said one of his jingles made by Kenny Everett. But photographs began to show his newer colleagues taking on the fashions of the Swinging Sixties, while Dave Dennis remained in the swing of an earlier era. After his departure from the station, Spence's Christmas single recorded under his own name made full use of his actor-DJ talents and his acerbic humour - any eight-year-old listening would genuinely believe there was a Santa Claus, while anyone older would hoot with laughter at the cloying sentimentality.

== Training and mentoring style ==
The veteran radio presenter John Peters has described his own broadcasting style as bright, tight, brief and real. Peters was trained and mentored by Spence at UBN, and these were precisely the qualities Spence emphasised to trainees from the late 1960s to the mid 1980s. Spence's own presentation style when he left Radio London at the end of 1966 was far removed from the style he encouraged in later years as a radio executive and trainer. But despite his abandonment of what he later called the "disc jokey" style, his approach was entirely consistent in having respect for the audience. If the audience had moved on, then so should the presenters.

As a trainer and mentor, Spence became a ferocious critic of the on-air performances of radio DJs. Dale Winton described him as "a very hard taskmaster who took no prisoners and could be terrifyingly blunt and honest if he didn't like your performance." On listening to Winton's second show at Radio Trent, Spence "true to form, pulled my performance to pieces with all the skill of a friendly surgeon without the use of anaesthetic." Spence liked Winton enough to give him a regular afternoon show. If he didn't like a DJ, the words he used might be much the same, but the surgeon's delivery would be icily dismissive.

However, most DJs with the talent on which to build a career came to respect and admire Spence, who despite an abrasive personality at times, could warm towards those in whom he saw significant potential. Certainly he was keen to ensure that every presenter he trained and mentored produced their best possible performances on air. Given the qualities and immediacy of the medium, it was crucial for DJs to have the ability to recover from a mistake or a setback and continue to broadcast effectively and entertainingly, and Spence's withering critiques could be seen as essential to build on-air resilience.

At UBN in the early 1970s he ran in effect a different radio station for each factory shift. A morning top-40 format gave way to an evening middle-of-the-road feel, and then a soul, blues and reggae station at night. "The whole station is run on tight commercial lines," he told trade magazine Billboard, but added: "Unlike US Top 40 we allow much scope for a DJ's personality - and for factories in England this is just what is needed and indeed, required. This does not necessarily mean more rap [i.e. chat] - just better rap."

At the National Broadcasting School, Spence distilled the lessons of his pirate days as well as his experience of UBN and Radio Trent. He brought on presenters suitable for ILR stations, which although they carried advertising, had a strong public service requirement as well as a commercial need to appeal to as many people in their local area as possible. At Radio London, Spence had been scrupulous in meeting and talking to his listeners, and listening to them in return, and he now instilled this approach into a new generation.

He was disparaging about presenters from his pirate days who went into ILR without changing their style to reflect a different audience and different times, telling one trainee in the early 1980s that if she listened to his old Radio London colleague Dave Cash, at that time a presenter at ILR's Radio West, she would never find an audience. Any trainee who mentioned Spence's own pirate radio past was given a cold stare and a cold shoulder. He told a former Radio London colleague who invited him to a reunion that he refused to get involved in "this dated, rebarbative and otiose subject." The actor-DJ who had thrived on a comedic onslaught by Dave Cash and Kenny Everett was careful to tell trainees that the only result if they did this to their own colleagues would be to make the butt of their jokes more popular, and their own ratings slide.

Spence took a high standard of technical competence as a basic requirement to present a tightly formatted show, and a bright personality was an absolute essential. But above all he insisted that presenters should be their authentic selves, despite his own success as a DJ having come from adopting an on-air persona. However, the personable Dave Dennis was still a recognisable part of Spence's often spikey off-air personality. His ferocious assessments of trainees' performance seemed designed to strip away any artifice or pretension, and force presenters to be genuine and real. Authenticity also meant they should use their own accent. Presenters who acquired a mid-Atlantic twang should be taken to the mid-Atlantic and left there. And he insisted DJs should be brief and to the point: "Just remember they want to hear the record. It's the people who made the record who have the real talent, not you."

Spence's critiques were always delivered while wearing his trademark dark suit and polished shoes, with every inch of his angular six foot two frame reinforcing that he was in charge. Spence played the part of programme controller with aplomb. He used the quintessential English upper-middle class accent that many successful actors adopted. His vocabulary was extensive to the point of baroque. His volume would rise and the speed increase as a trainee tried to get a word in edgeways, but in keeping with his ingrained professionalism, there was never a swearword, just in case somewhere a microphone was open.

== Influence and legacy ==
During Spence's 1966 trip to New York, the editors of the trade magazine Billboard were interested not only in his ability to build and hold a large radio audience, but in his views on the regulatory environment and the likelihood of commercial radio being introduced in the UK. Spence was demonstrable proof to the US industry that British audiences wanted more than the BBC was prepared to offer, and that US top-40 format commercial radio could be adapted to attract large advertising spends while still being authentically British.

He was not the only DJ broadcasting to the UK to develop the American top-40 format for a British audience, but he was the first to master it, and he took it further and faster than his contemporaries, making early pirate radio colleagues like Earl Richmond and Tony Windsor look stuffy in their turn. In doing so, he helped prove to the British government that British audiences had a thirst for something other than the staid BBC approach. In the event, in 1967 the British government introduced the Marine Broadcasting Offences Act, and the BBC established its national pop music station Radio 1. Once commercial radio had been ruled out by the British government, interest in Spence in the US was nil.

Spence's legacy as what Dale Winton called "one of the best ever DJs on pirate radio" could easily have been a host of imitators in the same Dave Dennis Double-D mould. David Lloyd, a former member of the Radio Authority, acknowledges Spence's impact saying: "His was a powerful voice and influence on the station from launch." But perhaps Spence's greatest achievement was to know when the pirate days had become tired and old, well before parodies like Smashie and Nicey started to bite those pirate DJs who became part of the BBC Radio establishment.

At UBN he turned what would have otherwise been a minor industrial radio station into an unlikely but significant source of major talent for ILR. Together with his work at Radio Trent and the National Broadcasting School, he produced not one but several generations of presenters who knew how to respect an audience in the best possible way - by keeping as many of them as possible entertained. His contribution to making independent radio a viable alternative to the monolithic BBC radio of the day was significant. As Dale Winton put it, he was already "an influential guy" before he even began to play a pivotal role at the National Broadcasting School.

Spence's former Radio London colleague Dave Cash, acknowledging that Spence as Dave Dennis had been a superb DJ, added: "His true vocation was teaching." In a profession tending naturally towards self-obsession, while Radio 1's ex-pirate DJs matured into their comfortable berths, Spence was developing not his own presentation style but that of others - together with a finely tuned ear for how a station should sound, what made it distinctive from its competitors, and most importantly how it could stay in touch with its audience.

== Bibliography ==
- Easton, Paul (2014) Taking the Biscuit
- Edwards, John (1966) 'Pirate Radio Stations,' Reporting 66, Independent Television News, 11 May
- Elliot, Chris (1997) The Wonderful Radio London Story ISBN 1901854000
- Lloyd, David (2012) The Castle Gate Years (Radio Trent) Part 1
- Lloyd, David (2012) The Castle Gate Years (Radio Trent) Part 2
- Offshore Echoes
- Payne, Chris & Mary Payne (1999-2015) Radio London
- The Pirate Radio Hall of Fame
- Prince, Tony (2015) History of DJ. Part 6
- Prince, Tony (2015) History of DJ. Part 7.
- Radio Atlanta 1964 (2015)
- Skues, Keith (2009) Pop Went the Pirates (2nd edition) ISBN 9780907398059
- Squire, Giles (2013) UBN - United Biscuits Network
- Stoller, Tony (2010) Sounds of Your Life: The Rise and Fall of Independent Radio in the UK ISBN 0861966902
- Toney, Ben (2011) The Amazing Radio London Adventure
- United Biscuits Network (1973)
