= Ron Onions =

English journalist and broadcasting executive

Ron Onions OBE
- Viewing Apollo 11 take-off, July 1969
- Born: 27 August 1929; Edmonton, London, England
- Died: 27 May 2012 (aged 82); Surbiton, London, England
- Occupations: Broadcast journalist and editor
- Years active: 1949–1995
- Known for: Creating the news presentation style on British independent radio

Ronald Edward Derek Onions OBE (27 August 1929—27 May 2012) was an English broadcast journalist who in the 1970s pioneered a new style of radio news on the emerging local independent stations in Britain. Inspired by US radio stations heard while he was working in New York, Onions established significant change in news presentation with regular hourly bulletins which were brisk, vivid and immediate. His populist, almost tabloid, presentation was in contrast to the cautious, traditional and less frequent bulletins of the national broadcaster. The style quickly became established throughout the United Kingdom.

Onions' career in journalism began with local newspapers in London and on the south coast of England. In the 1960's he joined the BBC's television and radio news department, working on the nightly current affairs programme Tonight and then reporting and presenting on the broadcaster's new channel, BBC Two. After taking charge of the BBC's emergency coverage of the Aberfan disaster in Wales in 1966, he was appointed the broadcaster's first news organiser in the Americas at a momentous period of US history. There he produced the BBC's coverage of the assassinations of Martin Luther King Jr. and Robert F. Kennedy and of the Apollo 11 Moon landing. Onions was later Head of News at Capital Radio in London where he introduced his pioneering news presentation with immediate success. He was then appointed Editor-in-Chief of the London Broadcasting Company and Independent Radio News, where the style was developed and sustained. As a result of its success it was copied and established permanently throughout British radio.

== Early life ==
Onions was born in Edmonton in North London on 27 August 1929 to Benjamin Onions, a plumber, and Elizabeth Amelia Onions, née Lewin. He was raised in hard financial circumstances in neighbouring Enfield and educated at Edmonton County Grammar School. On leaving school Onions carried out two years' national service in the Royal Air Force as an Aircraftman First Class, serving as a clerk in Equipment Accounts at RAF Abingdon in Oxfordshire.

== Early career ==
Onions learnt his trade in journalism on the Enfield Gazette and as a sports reporter and sports editor for the Tottenham Weekly Herald in North London. In 1958 he moved to Brighton on the south coast of England to become a sub-editor on the local Evening Argus.

In 1960 Onions left print journalism to join the newsroom of Southern Television, an independent broadcaster based in the port city of Southampton in southern England. After less than a year with Southern TV, Onions joined the BBC in their new local television and radio operation in Southampton to write, report and present news programmes. He remained with the BBC in Southampton for four years.

== BBC national television ==
In 1965 Onions returned to London to join the production staff of the BBC's early evening flagship current affairs programme, Tonight, where he served for a short time before moving to BBC Television News as a sub-editor. He was soon fast-tracked into reporting and presenting news on the BBC's new second channel, BBC2, as well as directing film reports on political affairs and elections.

In October 1966 he was called on to organise the BBC's emergency television coverage of the Aberfan disaster in South Wales in which 116 schoolchildren and 28 adults were killed when a coal mining waste tip collapsed. For days without much sleep he ensured "the catastrophe’s awful scope was properly understood and told". In a "remarkable and humane piece of broadcasting" Onions' arrangements for the televising of the children's funerals placed five cameras in the village and in the cemetery and he insisted that commentary would be superfluous and intrusive, and so the edited images were transmitted with only the natural sound of the procession and the ceremony. Onions' recollection towards the end of his life of his role at Aberfan was "self-effacing ... and gives little hint of the pivotal part he played or the emotional reaction I know he felt," wrote his former BBC News colleague Tony Crabb.

== News organiser, New York ==
Onions' multi-abilities in presenting, reporting, directing, producing and facilitating the work of others, particularly as demonstrated by his work at Aberfan, were highly regarded by BBC News. In November 1967 the BBC, realising "the need to have field producers organising coverage of big breaking stories", appointed him to the "prestigious" newly created post of Television News Organiser, based in New York, covering North and South America and the Caribbean from an office in the Rockefeller Centre in Manhattan. Here, for five years, working with correspondents of the stature of Charles Wheeler and Gerald Priestland, he orchestrated the BBC's coverage of major events. Notable among them were the assassinations of Martin Luther King Jr and Robert F Kennedy, the Mỹ Lai massacre in Vietnam, the fatal student protests at Kent State University and the achievements of the Apollo 11 crew in landing on the Moon. Onions enjoyed notable successes in this role. As the UK Press Gazette reported, "It was a golden professional period. Far from being daunted by history in the making, Onions relished his instinct for it."

At the end of Onions' five-year term in America, the BBC invited him to replace their correspondent Charles Wheeler in Washington, D.C. when Wheeler returned to London. Largely for family reasons, Onions turned down that opportunity and also a subsequent offer to become the BBC's news organiser in Tokyo. In 1972 he returned to London. There he was offered the post of deputy foreign editor but, finding himself increasingly at odds with the BBC, he declined. He later recalled: "In a foolish display of petulance, I said I didn't see myself as deputy to anyone". Despite his "restlessly creative spirit" he returned to the sub-editors' desk.

== Capital Radio News ==
In 1973 Independent Local Radio was launched in the United Kingdom. Applications were invited by the Independent Broadcasting Authority for two franchises in London, one for an entertainment station and one for news. One of the applicants for the entertainment franchise invited Onions to become its Head of News if it won the franchise. Onions accepted but the applicant failed in its bid.

Onions was disillusioned by the BBC and its news department and wanted to develop and work on a different style of news broadcasting after being impressed by radio news in New York. In the spring of 1973 Onions approached a former BBC colleague, Michael Bukht, the programme controller of the winner of the entertainment franchise, Capital Radio. Bukht told Onions he was looking for a Head of News and invited him to meet the company's chairman, Richard Attenborough, and the managing director, John Whitney. They immediately offered Onions the post and he left the BBC to join Capital in late July 1973, ten weeks before the station was to go on air.

Onions recruited an 18-strong team of mostly unknown radio writers, editors, reporters, producers and presenter/newsreaders to run Capital's round-the-clock news service. Some came from BBC radio, some from hospital and industrial radio services, some from Australia, New Zealand and Canada with experience in commercial radio, and one or two from theatre and television. A number of the young team, such as Tricia Ingrams from United Biscuits Network, Robin Houston from a voiceover and technical theatre background and Greg Grainger from Australian radio, were later to become household names. With the addition of its secretarial support, Onions' Capital Radio newsroom was seen as "surprisingly extensive".

When in New York, Onions had been a keen admirer of the non-stop all-news radio stations, CBS and WINS. He later recalled that "they had a dynamic quality not yet experienced in the United Kingdom." It was this energy that Onions wanted to harness and introduce to Capital's hourly (and in the breakfast show, half-hourly) news bulletins 24 hours a day, in contrast to the BBC's traditional, cautious, moribund news presentation. At Capital Radio he was responsible for introducing to the UK the fast three-minute "synopsis" or "snapshot" bulletin. "Relying on pace, brilliant writing, vivid interview snippets and short, punchy eyewitness reports – immediate, upfront, sometimes brash, and always with an 'angle' – it helped pave the way in this country for the modern concept of 'rolling news'." It was a "lighter, jauntier approach ... akin to that of a tabloid newspaper," wrote the Times.

Broadcaster Martha Kearney, later to be one of Onions' journalist "finds", described the new style: "Everything was live, much more immediate, and for reporters ... everything had to have actuality: it was about sound, it was being in the situation, you used very short news clips, you always had to make sure you were there, gathering the material yourself." The Press Gazette maintained that Onions' approach to radio news "swept away the more traditional 'bulletin of record' style. In an Onions bulletin "news was always moving forward, rather than just a summary of recent history."

Despite ensuring that Capital Radio News was a pioneer in the new, vigorous and brisk presentation of news, Onions' time at the station was brief. He later recalled: "I spent only six months working for Capital but I now think of it as perhaps the happiest time of my life." (Note: In fact, Onions worked for Capital Radio from late July 1973 to early in April 1974, a period of 8–9 months. Six months was the period from the start of transmission in October 1973 to Onions' departure.) Under heavy pressure from the Independent Broadcasting Authority, concerned at the low quality of presentation achieved by Capital's London news competitor, the London Broadcasting Company (LBC) and Independent Radio News (IRN), Onions was head-hunted to move to LBC. "'No!', I said 'Not that!'", he recalled later. "Not easily, I decided to join LBC". Early in April 1974 he left Capital Radio to join LBC.

== LBC and IRN ==
In 1974 Onions was appointed Deputy Editor-in-Chief of the London Broadcasting Company (LBC) and Editor of Independent Radio News (IRN). LBC had won the franchise for the London news station with responsibility also for IRN which was to provide a news service for local independent radio stations around the UK as they began operating. In starting up it had employed mostly newspaper journalists who had little or no experience in radio broadcasting, and it was said to be "disorganised and amateurish, unstable, financially precarious, beset by union problems". The Independent Broadcasting Authority judged LBC's output as a news-based 24-hour speech station to be extremely poor, audience figures were low and there were severe financial problems. Onions' task there was to "nurture and professionally stabilise a chaotic and financially vulnerable" LBC/IRN by introducing the authority, energy and brisk news presentation style that had proved successful at Capital Radio. "It meant straightening out some of the early problems that seemed horrendous at the time," Onions remembered years later. "...growing up was traumatic, and all of those early problems one wouldn't want to go through again. One can look back and reminisce about them and now laugh about them in some instances, but it was tough going."

The most immediate problem of inexperienced personnel was eased by Onions rapidly headhunting staff from the BBC and recruiting from his former team at Capital Radio. Further expertise arrived in December 1974 when Capital, facing its own financial problems, closed its newsroom and made the 12 remaining staff redundant. As a result, LBC was boosted from Capital by two newsreader/presenters who were already well known to London listeners, and a number of seasoned radio reporters, all experienced practitioners of the Onions news style.

Onions was still faced with pitifully low advertising income, increasing financial problems and continual industrial unrest, prompted by pay demands at a time of fast-rising inflation. A round of voluntary redundancies placed Onions' staffing at risk but throughout 1974, supported by the Editor-in-Chief Marshall Stewart and Output Director Peter Robins (both recent BBC imports), he began to build up the presentation, reporting, writing and producing expertise the station needed. There were a few original LBC staff who had shown promise like Jon Snow, Adrian Love and Peter Allen and others who had arrived with BBC experience (though several of them left within months, despairing at the lack of resources and the inexperience of much of the staff recruited from newspapers). Others added to the team were BBC incomers Bob Holness and Douglas Cameron, whose double-headed AM breakfast programme attracted more London listeners than the BBC's Today programme. Former Capital Radio newsreaders Tricia Ingrams and Robin Houston and deputy-editor Tony Tucker boosted the presentation team, while Capital reporters like Bill Spencer, Ian Gilchrist, Paul Michaels and Christopher Hourmouzious joined "Onions' squad of dynamic young reporters", and constantly scooped their BBC rivals. Increasingly, also, Onions recruited experienced writers and producers.

Gradually, Onions was able to send a few reporters overseas on important stories, and the station's parliamentary unit began to break a number of leading political exclusives. Using rolling news, reportage, vox pops and phone-ins, airborne traffic reports and parliamentary broadcasting – and the sprightly vigour of its presentation – LBC/IRN began to increase its listening figures.

All the while the news style which Onions had successfully established in the first six months of Capital Radio provided the key. "Almost every significant change in the practice of radio news gathering in the final quarter of the last century was pioneered at LBC," one media commentator has written. "LBC/IRN made a major contribution to radio journalism and, unfettered by the caution and smugness of the BBC, innovated to the point of recklessness." The sound of British news "became much more immediate and altogether fresher and part of the modern world", Martha Kearney has maintained. One-time LBC phone-in presenter Brian Hayes has reported that "it was more alive and you had reporters telling stories in a way that made you think as a listener that you knew them and then you therefore started to trust them."

Despite the growing success of the station in terms of output and listener appreciation, it was still severely hampered by low revenue, industrial strife and management turmoil. Onions later recalled that "there was quite a militant union which had got used to running the place itself, and which wanted pay parity with the BBC, for understandable reasons. But the money just was not there. At one point we had just one commercial running on the station ... bringing in an income of about £5000 when we had a wage bill running at 20 times that." There was a change of managing director and a change of chairman. At one stage when the Editor-in-Chief was on sick leave, and without consulting Onions, the new chairman trimmed LBC's already meagre budgets. In 1977, the Editor-in-Chief left and Onions took over his job, but was not given his title.

1978 saw another new chairman who, despite listening figures reaching two million, was increasingly concerned about the station's industrial relations. He brought in a new managing director, and Onions, in a perceptible demotion, was given a new title, beneath the MD, of editorial director. Despite that, in 1979 Onions was voted Local Radio Personality of the Year by the Local Radio Association. In 1980 he was also appointed to the Board of LBC.

In 1982 a profound influence on LBC/IRN's development was seen when Britain went to war with Argentina in the South Atlantic. Onions fought trenchantly, and ultimately successfully, against a reluctant Ministry of Defence for one of his reporters, Kim Sabido, to be allowed to join the accredited press ranks, travel to the Falkland Islands and be embedded with the troops on the front line. Sabido's reports, and those of another IRN reporter, Antonia Higgs, stationed in Buenos Aires, gave IRN, LBC and all the other independent radio stations around the UK a new and unprecedented level of credibility. Onions later remarked of that time: "It left us with the feeling that we had more than made our mark in the story of radio reporting in Great Britain." He also observed that research figures taken during the war showed LBC's audience to be at its highest ever.

However, once the war was over, listeners, tiring of news, returned to the music stations and LBC's figures dropped to almost their lowest.

Later in 1982 Onions fought, against keen competition, for LBC/IRN to win the renewal of its licence. Negotiations were tense, but the Independent Broadcasting Authority agreed that the franchise would be renewed. "Somehow," wrote Onions in his memoir of the time, "we battled our way through, but for me it was one of those climactic moments in life and convinced me that it was time to move on." He was further convinced when a subsequent surprise change to programme schedules was carried out while he was on leave, without him being consulted. Onions left LBC/IRN nine-and-a-half years after he joined the station, in October 1983.

"Both modest and a realist", wrote the Press Gazette, "Onions knew the revolutionary impact of LBC/IRN, but would always downplay his role, preferring to credit the talent of the teams he employed." Nevertheless, later in 1983, Onions was awarded an OBE for services to broadcasting.

== Visnews ==
In 1983 Onions was invited to join Visnews, a leading distributor of news film to television stations all over the world. His task was to launch a non-stop news channel aimed at the growing cable television market. The project was called World News Network (Note: World News Network should not be confused with a later news aggregator of the same name, with which there is no connection.) and was much trailed by Onions around the United Kingdom and the rest of Europe, but the lack of enthusiasm from potential purchasers together with financial problems prevented the proposed channel going ahead.

== Jazz FM ==
As a lifetime lover of Jazz, in 1989 Onions advised a group interested in opening a jazz music radio station in London. Using his expertise in franchise applications learned while with LBC/IRN, Onions took an active part in the process. There were 30 other applications, two of which were also based on jazz, but the bid with which Onions was involved was successful. He was invited to join the board of the company, Jazz FM, and was appointed Station Director. He had only six months from the winning of the franchise to employ staff and work on programme policy before the station's first day on air in March 1990.

By his own account, he found the task difficult. There were differences of opinion with his fellow board members and strains within management, which persisted even after the station went on air. His choice of DJs was queried by the board. They made some appointments with which Onions disagreed and other presenters to whom Onions had offered jobs were rejected. But his ability to spot and encourage young talent brought two presenters to the station who later enjoyed sustained success in jazz radio broadcasting: Helen Mayhew and Jez Nelson.

Jazz FM had initial problems with a computerised system of playing output which was unreliable and, while at first enjoying over a million listeners, the station was launched into an economic recession. After nine months there was a slump in advertising revenue. Audiences, retuning to news stations while the Gulf War took place, halved to around 500,000 a week. As a result, in February 1991 the station was forced to shed half of its 40 staff. Onions was among them, being fired as Programme Director before the station's first year was up. In a light-hearted piece Onions had written for The Guardian in the days just before Jazz FM launched, he complained: "Really, I'm just a hack. I should have stayed with News. I shouldn't have left the BBC. Or LBC. Or Visnews. I'm good at news."

== London News Radio ==
In the time since Onions had left in 1983, LBC/IRN had gone through a number of owners and different formats. By 1992 it was owned by an Australian company and was facing a fight to renew its licence in 1993.

Onions, who felt the station had lost its way, joined some other senior figures who had worked with him at LBC/IRN to launch a bid to win the franchise and take over the two frequencies the Australian company used. Onions’ team, London News Radio, won the new franchise in September 1993. Short of finance to run the operation themselves, they sold their interest to the news agency Reuters for £5-million. This left the team unencumbered by financial problems and free to set up the two new stations they envisaged. The FM frequency provided a general service of rolling news, similar to WINS in New York which had been Onions' original inspiration, repeating and updating the news every 20 minutes. The medium-wave service offered London Forum Radio, a talk and phone-in service. The new stations were launched in October 1994.

Onions did not stay long at London News Radio once transmission had started. He had now reached retirement age. "Thirty-five years in the rough and tumble of broadcasting, BBC and commercial, home and abroad, was more than enough," he later maintained. London News Radio was his last job in broadcasting.

== Character ==
The Press Gazette, in writing about Onions, celebrated his "characteristic combination of vision and chutzpah ... Many will remember not only Onions' brisk and exacting standards, but also the happy alliance of these to his handsome charm and an unexpectedly quirky good humour." Onions, it went on, "never forgot the human side of what he was doing, either in the workplace or in terms of the output he editorially oversaw. Instinctively kind and considerate beneath the demands of his professional nature, he won many friends among his employees."

== Personal life ==
Onions married his "childhood sweetheart" Doris Moody in Edmonton in 1951. She was a graduate of the Royal Academy of Music with a teaching diploma in speech and drama. The couple had two daughters, the younger of whom, Louise, was born without a thyroid gland, and her resulting severely-disruptive symptoms posed a huge challenge to her family.

After her death in 2009, which caused Onions "huge grief", the family jointly authored a book, Don't Bring Lulu: Her Family's Tale of Trial and Triumph, about her life and the family's problems and joy in looking after her, combined with a memoir of Ron Onions' professional life. The book was the idea of Onions' elder daughter, Sarah, also a journalist, and "it rescued Ron from the black-dog melancholy that had sometimes been the dark side of his creative spirit." It was published shortly before Onions' death.

As well as his OBE in 1983, Onions was awarded a Queen Elizabeth II Silver Jubilee Medal in 1977.

He died unexpectedly in his sleep on 27 May 2012, at the family home in Surbiton, overlooking the River Thames in London. He was 82.

== Legacy ==
On Onions' death the Press Gazette stated that "almost every news programme on British television and radio bears the stamp, in some degree, of the mercurial genius who in the 1970s and 80s created the whole ethos of commercial radio news and current affairs ... The list of people who passed through Ron Onions' tutelage at LBC/IRN now reads like a who's who of some of the most distinctive names in broadcast news."
