= National Broadcasting School =

National Broadcasting School London
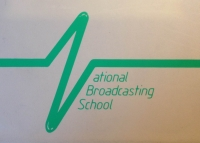
- National Broadcasting School logo 1980-85
- Type: Professional training
- Established: 1980
- Parent institution: Independent Broadcasting Authority
- Principal: Michael Bukht (1980-1985)
- Academic staff: Neil Spence, Martin Campbell
- Location: 14 Greek Street, Soho, London, England

The National Broadcasting School began operating in 1980 as an independent organization supported by the UK's Independent Broadcasting Authority (IBA) to provide professional training in radio presentation, production and journalism for Independent Local Radio (ILR). NBS's chairman was Peter Baldwin, deputy director of radio at the IBA, and one of the three governors appointed by them.

The need for a unified training scheme for ILR stations was established the previous year in a report by the Radio Consultative Committee. The school was an aspirational project favored by Capital Radio managing director John Whitney, who shortly afterwards became director general of the IBA.

The IBA's National Broadcasting School operated in London from 1980 to 1985. After a break of 18 years, a National Broadcasting School was established in 2003 in Brighton by former staff member Rory McLeod. In 2015 a National Broadcasting School operates in Liverpool and is associated with the long-established ILR station Radio City, continuing in a similar tradition to the NBS of the 1980s.

== Background ==
In the early 1980s professional radio training was provided almost exclusively by the BBC. Those independent stations who did train their staff, particularly journalists, found they moved quickly to ITV or the BBC. Music presenters came up through the UK's network of hospital radio and student radio stations, or from the very few other opportunities available, such as the corporately run United Biscuits Network, UBN, and some larger ILR stations managed to attract talent from pirate radio.

However, ILR stations had specific obligations in order to hold their licences. They were independent stations, not commercial stations, required to produce local output, including strong local news, information and features, plus a wider range of music than a commercial station would be prepared to sustain. They required a particular style of presenter, far less staid than BBC local radio, but still in touch with a local audience rather than having a full-on commercial approach. Smaller stations in particular had to grow their own talent, unable to rely on well-known names from the BBC or pirate radio joining them.

NBS was seen as a way of attracting new talent to the independent broadcasting sector and providing professional training relevant to the new and more flexible working practices and modern equipment being introduced into ILR. The six broadcast-capable studios and newsroom were new and well-equipped in comparison to the general standards in BBC local radio at that time, having the latest decks and cartridge machines. Students could use professional-quality Marantz cassette recorders for news gathering rather than the unwieldy reel-to-reel Uher machines used by the BBC. The IBA reported in 1981 that NBS had "quite impressive studios and facilities in Greek Street."

Funding came from a controversial levy by the IBA on the profits of ILR stations, called "secondary rental", which created a pool of money for the common use of the industry. In 1980 secondary rentals from ILR had been swollen by a strike at ITV which meant advertisers and audiences turned to radio, and part of this windfall was used to finance the setting up of the school.

== Establishment and staffing ==
The school was housed in the former St James's & Soho Club at 14 Greek Street, Soho. As a working men's club in 19th century London it had been a focus for radical activity - perhaps a fitting heritage for the ex-pirate radio staff who began to frequent it in the early 1980s. Less fitting perhaps, the Times reported that NBS was housed in what was once a "thriving Victorian brothel." It was described by former trainee Fiona Phillips as "right in the centre of London's partially cleaned-up redlight district." The burgeoning Comedy Store above a strip club a few streets away became a magnet for those who saw Kenny Everett as a more suitable role model than Lord Reith.

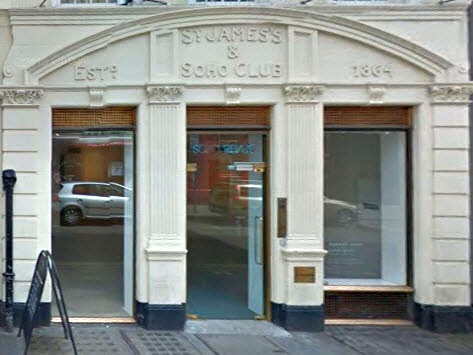
14 Greek Street, Soho, home of the National Broadcasting School from 1980 to 1985 (photographed in 2015). The main studio was at street level behind the centre and right-hand-side windows. Upper floors housed a newsroom and production offices.

NBS's principal was the broadcaster Michael Bukht, later one of the founders of Classic FM, who was best known for his appearances on the BBC show Food and Drink in his persona as Michael Barry the Crafty Cook, a title he first used on London's Capital Radio in the 1970s. One of the first handouts given to new trainees was an extensive list of nearby Soho restaurants, each with a price guide and a capsule review prepared by the principal.

Bukht had worked in Jamaica, where he reinvigorated commercial radio, and had recently returned from Transkei, one of the "independent" republics set up by the government of South Africa during apartheid, where he established Capital Radio 604. This privately run station, free of state control and providing uncensored music and news to South Africa, was firmly in the pirate radio tradition.

Michael Bukht was programme controller of Capital Radio when John Whitney asked if he would launch NBS to support the expansion of ILR, then growing at the rate of five to eight stations a year. While the need for new staff was growing, the number lost to television each year was also growing.

NBS's director of programmes was the influential former pirate radio DJ Dave Dennis (real name Neil Spence), who in the 1960s was among the first to introduce a high-pressure American style of music radio presentation to the UK while working at the pirate station Radio London, where he worked alongside the maverick DJ and presenter Kenny Everett. At Capital Radio, Bukht was now the programme controller charged with harnessing Everett's talent.

Spence had left Radio London in 1966 and had since developed a reputation as a talent spotter. He had been a tutor at Earl Richmond's "London Broadcasting School" where one of his students was James Whale, In the 1970s he had been programme controller at UBN where he developed talents such as Graham Dene, and programme controller at ILR's Radio Trent where he employed ex-UBN presenter Dale Winton.

NBS's central location in 1980s Soho and the presence of Neil Spence led many a former pirate radio DJ to pop in for a catch-up, along with others Spence had trained and mentored as programme director at UBN. NBS trainees often had the slightly strange sensation of vaguely recognizing the face of a visitor they passed on the stairs, but then hearing an instantly-recognizable voice.

Head of news was Martin Campbell, an experienced journalist who after eight years in newspapers moved into commercial radio in 1975, and had been head of talks at BRMB in Birmingham, and head of features at Radio Trent in Nottingham, where among a comprehensive speech output he fronted daily phone-ins and music shows, and produced commercial radio's first situation comedy. In 1998 he would become director of programming and advertising at the Radio Authority and in 2004 the first head of radio at Ofcom. In his early career Campbell was said to have been inspired by Neil Spence's teachings on radio broadcasting.

Among the journalism staff was Rory McLeod, who began his career at the ILR station Radio Clyde in Glasgow and in 1983, Rory alongside Keith Belcher, helped establish Southern Sound .Keith Belcher stayed on as Managing Director. In 2003 after a break of 18 years Rory would be the director of a new "National Broadcasting School" near Brighton.

The school had a department of community education headed by Keith Yeomans, a BBC radio producer and later an adviser to the UK government's department of international development. Julie Hill, who had worked in training for the BBC and ITV as well as for the British Council overseas, was course director for NBS's Development Support Communication Course which was run for students from less-developed countries.

== Courses ==
Journalism courses were recognised by the National Union of Journalists, the NUJ, and accredited by the Joint Advisory Committee for the Training of Radio Journalists, JACTRJ, now the Broadcast Journalism Training Council, BJTC. Journalism trainees needed to be aged 18 or over, and at the beginning did not need to be graduates, although by 1984 most were.

Standards were rigorous. Trainees in presentation and production were selected by audition tape. Unlike the journalism courses, anyone could apply regardless of their qualifications, and Spence and his staff were deluged with audio cassettes which had to be whittled down ruthlessly to find candidates with potential.

Most trainees funded the substantial course fee and their living expenses themselves, and the 13-week courses were so intensive that working a part-time job to make ends meet was impossible. Industry sponsorship for trainees was extremely scarce, and taking the course required giving up any regular work they already had.

Spence's critique of a presenter's performance was always formidable, and his influence extended far beyond NBS. As a fledgling DJ Peter Young worked for Spence at UBN and benefited from his training and mentoring. By the time Spence was at NBS, Young was an experienced and accomplished presenter with a late night show on Capital Radio. "One night he phoned me on air to tell me off for something he considered to be out of order," said Young. "I had to laugh, but was very flattered that he considered it to be worth his while."

Turning out presenters for ILR meant teaching them to work creatively within a format and to develop an authentic on-air personality which was bright but accessible for a broad local audience. The tone was very different from pirate days, and Spence abhorred reminders of his pirate radio past. When one trainee presenter used a Dave Dennis catchphrase back to him during a critique, he asked her where she had heard it. When told it was from Dave Cash, who had worked with him at Radio London and was then programme director at the ILR station Radio West (now Heart Bristol), Spence was uncompromising: "If you listen to him you’ll end up working in Gibraltar with monkeys for an audience." Cash's feelings were hurt, but Spence had a point. Radio West struggled to find an audience until its music and presenters became more mainstream.

Presenters' end-of-course assessments were graded one to five. A five meant basic proficiency and competence, while a grade one denoted a student of outstanding talent and distinction. The course materials noted that a grade one was "very rarely awarded," but in practice Spence was never known to award a grade one, nor for that matter a grade two. A grade three was considered a high accolade - denoting "a student of merit - diligent, talented and able." At most, 20% reached this grade.

The school also ran intensive courses for broadcast engineers who wanted to work in ILR. It trained businessmen and politicians in media skills. It ran short courses for charities to learn how to get their information on air. It sent trainers out to ILR stations so that working broadcasters could brush up and develop their skills. It ran high-level seminars for station managers. It sent consultants to new stations to advise on training. The school was recognized by the British Council, and provided training advisers to stations in Oman, Jamaica and the Solomon Islands. Many trainees came from the Commonwealth. The intensive radio journalism and presentation courses continued throughout.

A television journalism course was set up in 1983 after NBS was approached by the editorial director of ITN, Mike Morris, who was concerned at the high drop out rate among ITN's small number of graduate trainees. In one two-year period, four out of six trainees had left, frustrated by what Morris's successor, Derek Taylor, labelled "sink-or-swim" training. NBS then provided structured television training in same mould as its radio training.

NBS courses were intensive with good reason. Nick Stuart, later to be an award-winning independent television producer and CEO of CTVC and Odyssey Networks, graduated in the top three of his radio journalism course to win a coveted industry placement at 2CR. Reflecting in 2014 he said: "I think the first two weeks at Two Counties was just a shock. Wow, it's this intense." He quickly moved to a 5am shift at another station to compile traffic and travel reports, where his first bulletin prompted the newsreader to hit him around the head for not providing completely clean copy: "Maybe it was just a style of management that was big in those days, that's all. Very aggressive."

== Alumni ==
NBS provided its courses to a large number of future broadcasters, some of whom became household names. They included the GMTV journalist and presenter Fiona Phillips, who wrote:

"After three months of intensive learning, including journalistic law, running our own newsroom, producing our own individual radio documentaries and drinking in most of Soho's all-night hostelries, I felt equipped to take on the world."

— Fiona Phillips, Before I Forget, 2010, p.172

Phillips' subsequent experience was typical - she was asked to work for free. But nearly all trainees accepted that the early months working in ILR would involve long hours and little if any pay, at least until they had proved that NBS had given them the practical skills valued by the industry.

Among other alumni, BBC Radio 2 presenter Jeremy Vine took a presentation and production course aged 17 before going to university, Chris Skudder of Sky Sports studied journalism, and so did Lisa Aziz, who became one of the first Asian presenters on British television.

Zeinab Badawi, who by the end of the 1980s was presenting Channel 4 News with Jon Snow, was one of the few trainees to have industry sponsorship: "In those days there wasn’t any kind of media course or anything like that. I was trained on the job, but ITV sent me to something called the National Broadcasting School, which doesn’t exist anymore, which was in Soho, and I did a three-month intensive training course there and that was it."

Others who trained at NBS included the broadcaster and academic Tim McLellan, Virgin Radio presenter Russ Williams, and the LBC talk show host Clive Bull. Martine Dennis subsequently worked at LBC and the BBC before joining Al Jazeera English.

Among the many musicians who trained in presentation and production was the reggae artist Mikey Dread, who had produced The Clash's iconic single Bankrobber and worked on their album Sandinista!. From NBS he went on to narrate the Channel 4 reggae documentary Deep Roots Music and host the television series Rockers Roadshow.

Martha Kearney graduated from NBS at the start of a career in which she rose from phone operator and news information researcher at LBC to a BAFTA nomination for her coverage of the Northern Ireland Peace Process in 1998 and presenting the BBC's flagship The World at One

Chris Shaw became programme controller of Channel 5 and editorial director of ITN Productions. Michael Wakelin was BBC head of religion and ethics, and won Royal Television Society, Sony and other industry awards. Jonathan Pearce was a freelance football reporter in the early 1980s, then sports editor of Radio West, and in 2004 began to commentate on Match of the Day. Andrew Jones trained at NBS before becoming the first person in BBC Scotland to graduate from the BBC's MBA programme and became head of BBC Scotland.

John Leech won a clutch of Gold Medals at the New York Festival for his soul and dance shows, and a UK Sony Award for music documentary. Nick Hirst also won gold at the New York Festival and was responsible for running all British Foreign Office radio and print communications in more than 130 countries. Hugh Terry went to Radio Television HK as a presenter while also pursuing an acting career including the Radio 4 adaptation of Bleak House, which won a Sony radio award.

Gavin Ford features in the Pirate Radio Hall of Fame for his work at Radio Caroline and has presented for Lebanon's Radio One for 16 years. Tony Leo returned from NBS to Radio St Helena where he developed the station using voluntary producers in the community, retiring after 29 years service. Electronics engineer Bob James arrived at NBS from hospital radio and working as a club DJ, and after 20 years in commercial radio as presenter and engineer started broadcasting at Bay Radio in Spain. Debbie Flint worked at Piccadilly Radio as a broadcasting assistant before reporting and presenting for them, and later establishing a career as a children's presenter.

Among the international students who studied radio presentation and production was the Nigerian writer and broadcaster Agwu Nwogo who for many years worked for the Imo Broadcasting Service, IBS. Colin Burrows became a producer at Capital Radio and BBC Radio 1 before launching Sky's film programme and acting as a specialist consultant on film marketing. After NBS, Robert Gallacher began in the BBC's gramophone library and rose to be commissioning editor for BBC Radio 2 and BBC 6 Music, and has won three Radio Academy awards and five PROMAX awards. After NBS Sean Bolger joined Southern Sound as a presenter and after a spell at ILR station Radio 210 joined BFBS in Cyprus.

The documentarist Mark Halliley, best known for narrating UK series of The Apprentice, in his early years after leaving NBS produced a string of award-winning radio features, picking up New York Festival gold medals, Sony awards, a Prix Futura Berlin, and producing two ILR entries for the Prix Italia award.

== Closure ==
When it was set up, NBS was projected to be self-financing by the financial year 1983–84. The IBA was initially prepared to absorb some of the projected losses, with Capital Radio making substantial contributions, outweighing other ILR stations. But by 1983 NBS board members had to be given indemnities that they were "acting properly on behalf of the Authority," and by June 1984 the annual grant was no longer enough.

By 1984, seven ILR companies had reached the level of profitability required to pay the bitterly resented "secondary rental." Their trade body, the Association of Independent Radio Contractors, issued a strong protest to the IBA, in particular warning that they would not bear the costs of any proposed national independent radio station. The IBA responded tactically by reducing secondary rental by 10 per cent from July 1985, but the position for NBS was clear. For Tony Stoller, a former chief executive of the Radio Authority, this was a pivotal moment when independent local radio, with its clear obligations to local communities, was set on course to become commercial radio.

The school announced its closure on 11 July 1985, stating that the level of financial support available from the industry was insufficient to allow the school to continue training after the end of the existing courses that August. According to one of its television tutors, the ITN journalist Jon Lander:

"It was starved of both facilities and money, the private sector being reluctant to invest in training".

— Jon Lander, The Guardian (London), 9 August 2011

Announcing the closure, NBS chairman Peter Baldwin said that many broadcasters already looked back with "pride and affection" to their days at the school. The statement added: "During its five years of operation, the NBS, under its principal, Michael Bukht, has achieved an outstanding reputation for practical vocational training in broadcast programming, journalism and engineering."

== Legacy ==
Michael Bukht claimed that more than 3,000 broadcasters trained at the school between 1980 and 1985, but of this figure, only 500 or so took the flagship intensive 13 week courses in radio (and later television) journalism, and music radio presentation and production. Bukht was proud that at one point half of all the programme controllers in the UK had been trained at the National Broadcasting School, by a training staff which never numbered more than a handful. But pirate radio "anoraks" were also quick to note in 1985 that many of those who had trained at NBS in the previous five years were broadcasting on the current crop of pirate stations.

The impact of NBS's training at ITN was profound. Three months after NBS closed, editorial manager Derek Taylor, recalling his own "miserable" experience as a trainee in the 1960s, announced the development of new in-house training in the same mould as that of NBS. Although NBS had closed, he told staff: "At ITN, we were determined there would be no return to the Dark Ages." Former ITN staff reporter Sue Lloyd-Roberts had just a month's notice to organize a structured twelve-week training programme in TV journalism. As Taylor said: "After all, if we believe we're the best in the world at what we do, there ought to be just a few tricks we could pass on."

Many former NBS staff and students remained actively involved in training new generations. NBS head of news Martin Campbell became principal lecturer at Cornwall's post-graduate diploma in broadcast journalism, former trainee Andrew Jones launched an undergraduate degree in journalism at Robert Gordon University, and many others passed on the lessons and the ethos formally or informally in the following decades.

Bukht told former BRMB programme controller Mike Owen that NBS was "a wonderful organization," comparing it favorably to the subsequent rapid development of media studies degree courses. "The school was interested in theory only so far as it impinged on the practice, and that was a very different approach. There were no essays at the National Broadcasting School."

While the school's approach was very different from academic media studies, it was similar in ethos and approach to the long-established skills-based newspaper journalism courses and indenture system run by the National Council for the Training of Journalists. But even NCTJ courses required essays. At NBS the focus was more intense, more practical, faster-paced, and for large parts of the curriculum, live. As far as possible it reflected radio as a medium. Newspaper reporters had news editors and sub-editors to catch their mistakes before they became public. Live radio had no such luxury, and for presenters especially, any mistakes, lapses of taste, or errors of judgement went out on air. An environment which closely simulated real working conditions was essential for effective skills-based training.

With intensity came competition. Celebrating 20 years at Virgin Radio in 2013, a record for a commercial radio presenter, Williams recalled how he and Jeremy Vine had started the same NBS music presentation and production course exactly thirty years before, in 1983: "I came out with the Student of the Course award," he said. "I like to remind Jeremy of that from time to time."

But trainees were imbued with Bukht's considered approach to broadcasting, with the emphasis on finding a broad audience: "If you don't want to talk to the multitude, get off the mountain," he told his trainees. "Fundamentally, good radio is listener radio not broadcaster radio. I say to people good radio starts with the audience, it doesn't start with what you want to do."

The Guardian's classical critic and author Fiona Maddocks recalled: "His aim was to make first-class independent radio broadcasters of his students, of whom I was one: no airs, graces, circumlocution or elocution. His mythical listener was called Doris. "You've got to catch Doris hanging out her washing – and make her listen," was his mantra as we each headed to the microphone."

Interviewed in an era when local radio stations were amalgamating and digital and internet radio were making inroads, Bukht reinforced the message he gave his students in the 1980s: "It doesn't matter what the technology does, in the end it's a human being in the box that makes the difference."

== Successors ==
In 2003 former NBS staffer Rory McLeod became director of a new incarnation of the National Broadcasting School in Brighton. The new NBS was located in the Innovation Centre of the University of Sussex, and Red FM (Red Radio) was the school's own radio station. In 2007 it was running two practical 11-week courses - a radio news course for post-graduates, and a radio presentation and production course for which no formal qualifications were necessary other than "creativity and an ability to connect to the listener." Students created daily air shifts and news bulletins five days a week, using the equipment they would encounter in the workplace. Head of presentation and programming was Ray Arthur, ex-KROQ and a consultant to Virgin Radio.

In 2009 the school was described as having two centres, one in Brighton and the other in Liverpool at Radio City. It described its approach to training as "short, intensive, practical and demanding. Classes are small and the student to instructor ratio is never more than 7:1. Emphasis is on voice, creativity, fluency, performance plus core skills such as software and law."

In 2015 the National Broadcasting School / Radio City Academy in Liverpool under course director Liam Fogarty continues the tradition of training journalists for commercial and BBC radio stations, providing courses accredited by the Broadcast Journalism Training Council.

According to UK Press Gazette: "The course is based at the professional studios of Radio City in Liverpool, the UK’s most successful commercial radio station. The NBS has its own "Newsroom" and full-time access to its own training studio. Students also have access to the main broadcast studios when available. Each student has a professional portable recording kit and a work station, a network news provider, the internet, news software, programming software, Adobe Audition, and phone out interview facilities. Students will also broadcast on NBS Live during the course."

The NBS official Twitter account states: "We like to think we produce the best radio graduates in the country: the future of radio, if you like."

== Bibliography ==
- Radio Consultative Committee (RCC) General, 1980. RCC Paper 14 (80)) National Broadcasting School. IBA/00267. March 1980. Available: Bournemouth University, Broadcasting History Collections.
- Stoller, Tony (2010) Sounds of Your Life: The Rise and Fall of Independent Radio in the UK ISBN 0861966902
- Whitney, John (2013) To Serve the People ISBN 0861967100
