= Adrian Love =

British radio presenter (1944–1999)

Adrian Love (3 August 1944 – 10 March 1999) was a British radio presenter, remembered for his Love in the Afternoon programme on BBC Radio 2.

== Early life ==
Adrian Love was born in York on 3 August 1944 to Cicely Joyce (née Peters) and musician and bandleader Geoff Love. Love attended Tottenham Grammar School. Before beginning his radio career, he worked for Burton tailors and as a song plugger in Soho.

== Career ==
Love began his radio career in 1966 working for the pirate station Radio City on the Shivering Sands Army Fort. He moved ashore with a stint on the BBC Light Programme, which led to work on the BBC World Service.

In the early 1970s, Love became station manager at United Biscuits Network, an internal radio station serving the factories of United Biscuits. Due to the lack of commercial radio in the UK at the time, the station became known for breaking new acts. While there he recruited Roger Scott and Graham Dene, with whom he later worked at Capital Radio, and gave Dale Winton and Steve Allen their radio breaks.

The launch of commercial radio in 1973 led Love to move to LBC, to present Nightline, and then to Capital Radio, where he stayed for eight years, presenting an evening phone-in programme, Anna and the Doc, with agony aunt Anna Raeburn.

=== BBC Radio ===
In 1981, Love returned to the BBC, presenting programmes on Radio 1, Radio 2 and Radio 4. In 1982 he was sacked from his award-winning show on Radio 1 for broadcasting while drunk. Love later spoke of his alcoholism, and occasionally shared experiences with listeners.

Five years after being sacked from Radio 1, he returned once more to the BBC in 1987 working for Radio 2, initially presenting the daily afternoon show Love in the Afternoon. He was dropped from the schedule in 1990, but continued to present documentaries and special shows for the station such as Time Cycle and Pop Score. Love also deputised for other presenters, including Ken Bruce and Sarah Kennedy, before leaving the station in 1994.

=== Later career ===
Love worked at other radio stations, including BFBS, 102.2 Jazz FM and Classic FM. He was part of the starting line-up when Classic FM was launched in September 1992.

While at Classic FM, Love was Chancellor of the Oblique University, from which listeners could get a degree. The requirement was to apply for a research grant for something ephemeral, such as why a cup handle ends up at the back in a microwave, or to submit a basic truth such as "Women do not change their minds, they make further decisions." An A4 certificate was awarded to listeners whose submissions he read out. There were between 50 and 100 awarded.

Love spent his last four years as a presenter at BBC Southern Counties Radio.

== Personal life and death ==
Love was married three times and had 3 daughters. His second marriage was to Barbara Kudish on 13 May 1972 at Marylebone Town Hall, London. The couple had a daughter, Helen Peta in 1976.

Love married Ros Roux in 1990, in Tunbridge Wells, Kent. The couple had a daughter, Amy, later that year. By this time, Love lived in Edenbridge, Kent and was a lifelong asthmatic and heavy smoker.

In December 1997, Love was injured in a car crash, resulting in a collapsed lung, from which he never recovered. Love died on 10 March 1999, from a second lung collapse in the Kent and Sussex Hospital, Tunbridge Wells, aged 54. His funeral took place on 18 March 1999 at Crawley, West Sussex.
