= Skudder =

Skudder is a surname. Notable people with the surname include:

- Chris Skudder (born 1959), British broadcast journalist
- Ed Skudder (born 1986), American animator
- George Skudder (1948–2021), New Zealand rugby union player
- Nehe Milner-Skudder (born 1990), New Zealand rugby union player
