= David Dennis =

David or Dave Dennis may refer to:

- Dave Dennis (DJ) (1937–2007), British pirate radio DJ
- Dave Dennis (rugby union) (born 1986), Australian rugby union player
- Dave Dennis (activist) (born 1940), American civil rights activist
- David Dennis (actor) (born 1960), South African actor
- David W. Dennis (1912–1999), American politician
- David Dennis (rower) (born 1980), Australian Olympic rower
