= Greg Grainger =

Australian Filmmaker and Journalist

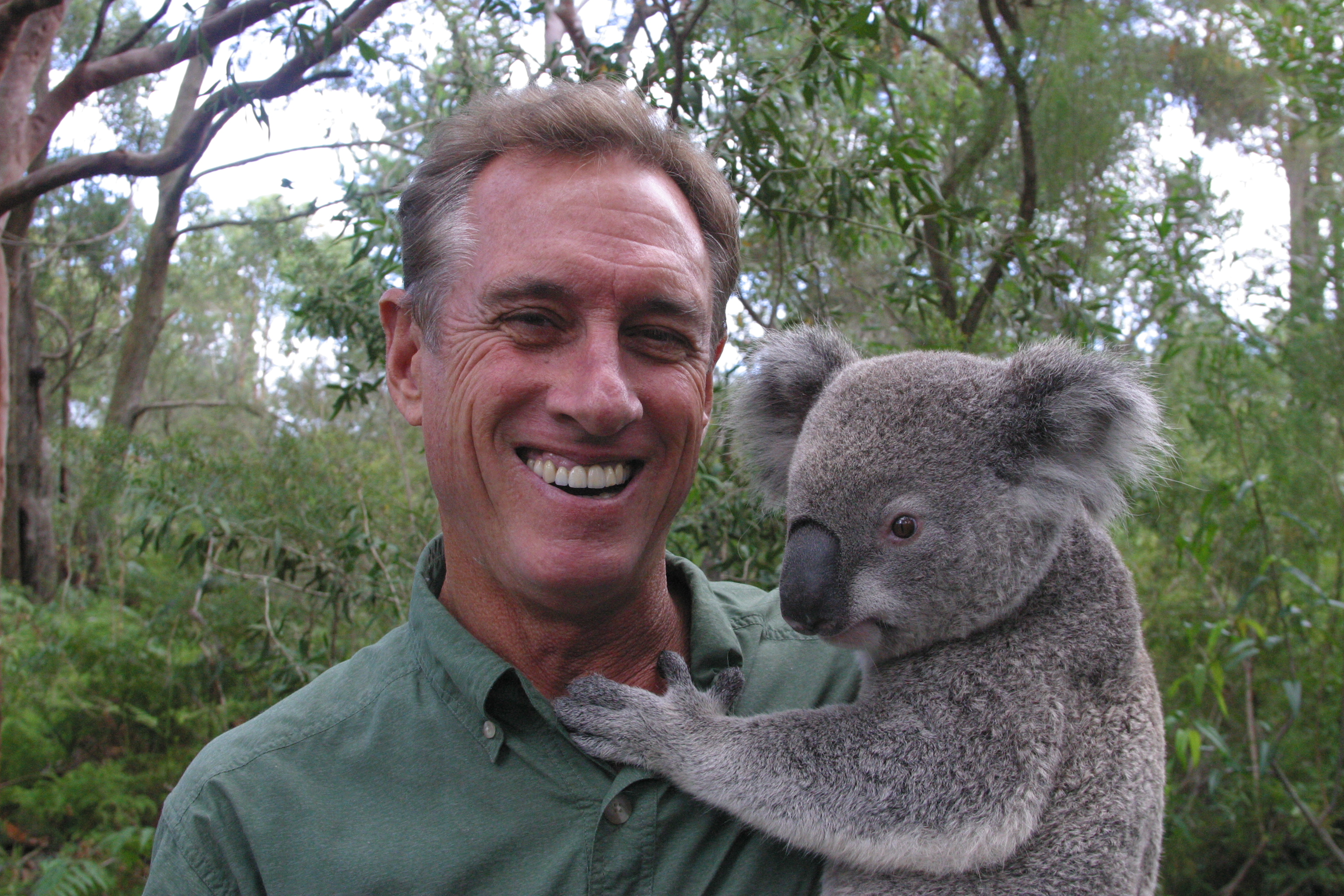
Grainger with Koala as part of his pro bono work for Humane Society International (September, 2011)

Greg Grainger is an Australian filmmaker and TV presenter and known for travel and adventure documentaries and wildlife programs.

Grainger is a Logie Award winner for "Best News Coverage" (9 Network) and 2011 IAB Awards "Best of Show".

Grainger is also the CEO and Executive producer of GraingerTV, Corporate Video Australia and Grainger Films.

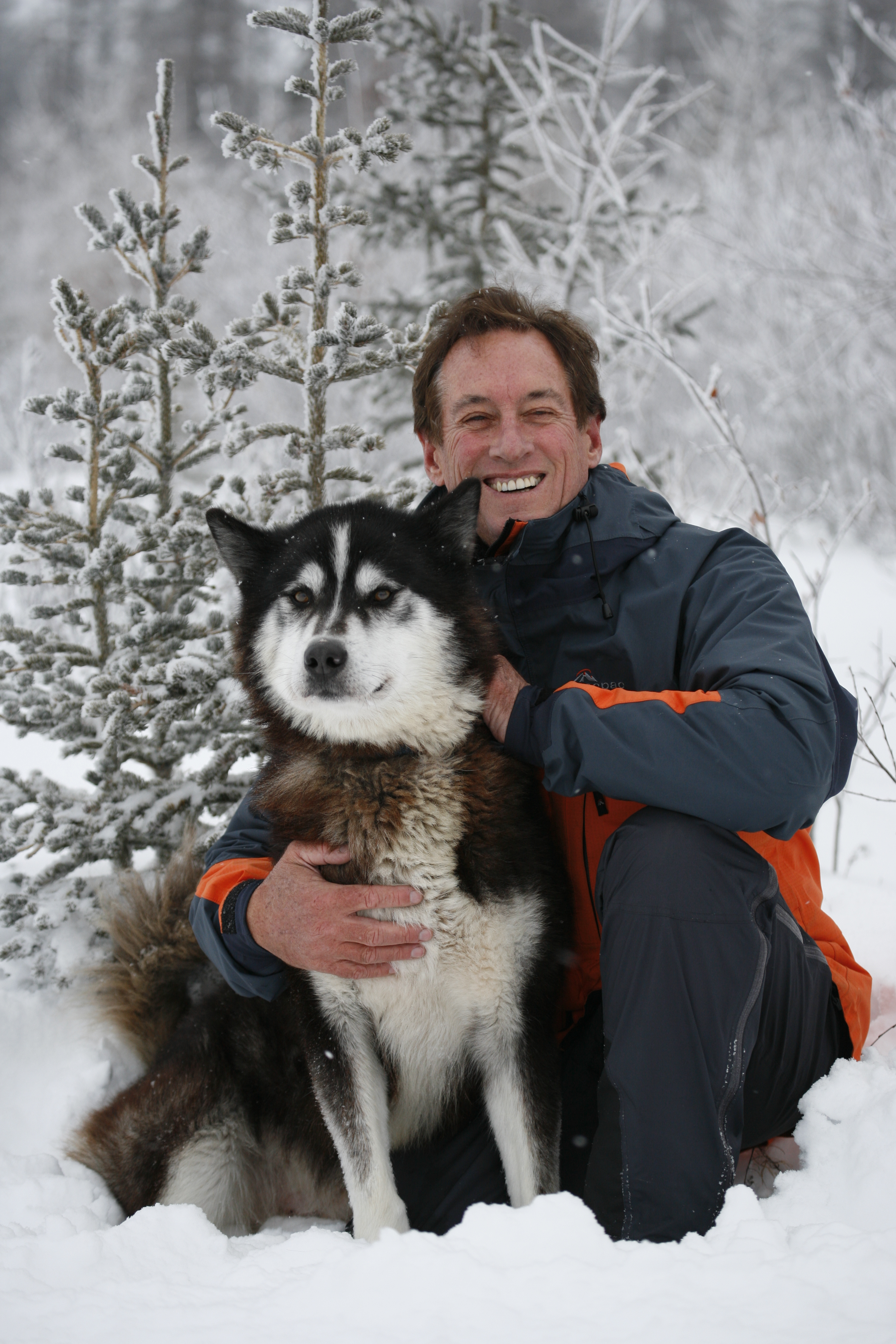
Grainger and husky during filming in Hudson Bay Canada of the polar bear survival documentary: On Thin Ice. (2007)

== Career ==
Grainger has worked for the National Geographic Channel, The Discovery Channel, ABC Australia (Southeast Asian TV channel), the Travel Channel, and the Seven Network.

Grainger's experience in radio and TV journalism include deputy news director Capital London, News Director Radio of 2UE Sydney, "General Manager Radio 2KA Blue Mountains, Radio 2GB, Radio 2UW".

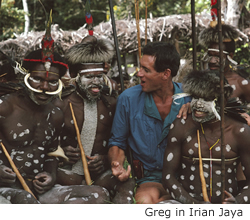
Grainger surrounded by members of the Dani Tribe in the Baliem Valley of West Papua (1993)

Grainger has produced a catalogue of adventure, travel and wildlife programs, from the "Antarctic to the Arctic", from the High Himalayas to the Dead Sea. Grainger's coverage of the Sydney Yugoslav General Trade and Tourist Agency bombing in 1972 won the Logie Awards for Best News Coverage. His 1991 encounter with Princess Diana was featured in the 2 part series THE CHARM OF BRITAIN.

Grainger's program Travel Oz resulted in him being appointed one of Tourism Australia's cultural ambassadors, as part of the Friends of Australia program.

In 1986, Grainger filmed White Fury - The Untame Tibet, the first white water rafting expedition across Tibet.

In the documentary film The Island at the End of the World, Grainger crossed South Georgia following the path of Ernest Shackleton.

Grainger's time with cannibals in Irian Jaya featured in the documentary Cannibal Crusade.

National Geographic commissioned Grainger to produce On Thin Ice, a documentary about polar bears and global warming. The film crew traveled to Hudson Bay in Canada and Svalbard in Norway.

Grainger produced the Making Tracks campaign for DDB Sydney and Tourism Australia. It won 1st prize for Best of Show during the 2011 IAB Australia Day.

Grainger produced and presented 96 episodes of Travel Oz. Episodes included visits to the Tiwi Islands, the Torres Strait Islands, the Simpson Desert and the Middleton Reef. The show ran on ABC1 from 2008 to 2013 and on the Seven Network from 2014 to 2015.

Grainger is an annual Australia Day ambassador.
