= Capital Brighton =

English radio station

- Brighton; England
- Broadcast area: Brighton and Hove, Sussex
- Frequencies: FM: 107.2 MHz; DAB Digital Radio (mono)
- Branding: 107.2 Capital

Programming
- Format: Contemporary hit radio

Ownership
- Owner: Global
- Sister stations: Heart Sussex

History
- First air date: As Surf 107: 27 March 1998 at 1:07pm As Juice 107.2: August 2003; As Capital: 3 September 2018 at 6am
- Last air date: 5 April 2019

Technical information
- Transmitter coordinates: 50.8333°N 0.2083°W

Links
- Website: Capital Brighton

Capital Brighton was a local radio station owned and operated by Global Radio as part of the Capital radio network. It served the Brighton and Hove area broadcasting on 107.2 FM and across Sussex on DAB.

In April 2019, the station was merged with a sister Capital station in Hampshire to form Capital South.

== History ==
=== Surf 107 ===
The station was first launched as Surf 107 in March 1998, when the Radio Authority licensed Brighton and Hove Local Radio Ltd to broadcast on a commercial basis to the Brighton and Hove area.

Co-founders Daniel Nathan and Eugene Perera had previously run a series of trial broadcasts in the city beginning with Festival Radio 97.7 operating under a Home Office special events radio licence in May 1990 during the Brighton Festival and in subsequent years using a Radio Authority restricted service licence from 1991 to 1993. Writer and broadcaster Simon Fanshawe was the first chairman of the company with Eugene Perera as managing director. Various local companies held shares. Surf 107 began broadcasting on Friday 27 March 1998 and went on to win its first Sony Award a year later.

=== Juice 107.2 ===
Logo used by Juice 107.2

In December 2000, the radio station was sold to Forever Broadcasting plc which rebranded the station as Juice 107.2. In August 2003, Daniel Nathan led a group of local investors with the aim of returning the station to local ownership. In 2011, Juice 107.2 managing director Ryan Heal was recognised as an Outstanding Brightonian for his stewardship at the radio station and leadership within the community.

By this point, Juice 107.2 was required to pay for simulcast on the emerging DAB digital radio platform. The company's directors did not consider the format suitable or financially sustainable and began lobbying parliament. In September 2012, in order to demonstrate an alternative approach to DAB, senior Ofcom engineer Rashid Mustapha together with Daniel Nathan initiated an experimental low cost DAB transmission that ran from the Juice 107.2 rack room and transmission site from September 2012 to January 2013 using open-source software. This work was commended in parliament by the Minister of State Ed Vaizey in November 2013.

An official trial was set in motion and on 31 July 2015, the Juice DIY DAB multiplex went live. In the same month, radio group UKRD acquired a 51% majority holding in the broadcaster, with Daniel Nathan remaining as chairman and local shareholders retaining the minority stake.

In August 2016, UKRD returned its holding in Juice to local investors. As part of the sale, Laurence Elphick, who had departed as Juice managing director in 2014, returned to the post.

In late October 2016, Ofcom's report concluded that the small scale trials had been a success. In March 2017, the Brighton multiplex became UK's first to only broadcast DAB+. A month later, the work that began as an experiment in Brighton was officially recognised when the Private Members' Small-Scale DAB Bill received Royal Assent to pass into law as an Act of Parliament. paving the way for a new generation of low cost DAB transmission around the UK.

=== Capital Brighton ===
On 17 January 2018, Global Radio announced it had bought Juice 107.2 for an undisclosed sum. The sale was expected to be finalised the following month. The original owners continue to operate the trial DAB+ multiplex, carrying 25 radio stations in the city.

On 2 August 2018, Global announced it would rebrand and relaunch Juice 107.2 as part of the Capital FM Network of contemporary hit radio stations.

Juice 107.2 officially ceased broadcasting from its studios at 170 North Street at midnight on Tuesday 14 August 2018. The station relaunched as Capital Brighton at 6am on Monday 3 September 2018.

=== Station merger ===
On 26 February 2019, Global confirmed the station would be merged with Capital South Coast. As of Monday 8 April 2019, local output consists of a three-hour Drivetime show on weekdays, alongside news bulletins, traffic updates and advertising. Local breakfast and weekend shows were replaced with network programming from London while Capital's Brighton studio – shared with Heart Sussex – would close.

The last local programming from Capital Brighton aired on Friday 5 April 2019. Local news, traffic and advertising for the Brighton area continues to air as opt-outs on Capital South.

== Bibliography ==
- Middleton, Judy (2003). The Encyclopaedia of Hove & Portslade. Brighton: Brighton & Hove Libraries.
