= Steve Allen (radio presenter) =

English radio presenter (born 1954)

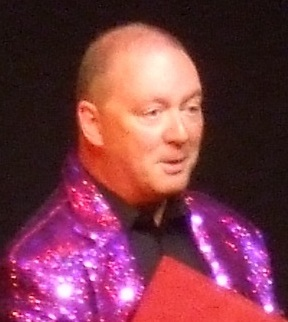
- Allen on stage at the Queen's Theatre, Hornchurch in 2010
- Born: 17 March 1954 (age 72); Bromley, Kent, England
- Occupations: Radio presenter, television presenter

Steve Allen (born 17 March 1954) is an English retired radio presenter. He joined LBC in 1979, initially as a newsreader. He later became the long-serving host of the station's early morning breakfast show until his departure in 2023.

== Radio career ==
Allen first worked as a nightclub disc jockey where he met long-time friend Dale Winton and subsequently joined the United Biscuits Network, a radio station broadcasting to workers in the United Biscuits factories. His voice was heard in Scotland, Liverpool, Manchester and London.

UBN closed in 1979, and Allen joined LBC as presenter of the Night Extra programme. He then moved on to present The Night is Young on the station. When LBC was separated into two stations- 1152 AM and 97.3 FM, Allen presented the afternoon show for 'London Talkback Radio' (later known as LBC London News 1152) and Saturday Night Out. Allen has also worked for Blue Danube Radio in Vienna, a station sponsored by the United Nations.

Allen presented the early breakfast show on LBC between 4am and 7am from Monday to Friday. On 24 February 2023, he announced that he had stepped down from LBC, after presenting his last show on 17 February.

In addition to these shows, Allen pre-recorded another programme for LBC – Steve Allen in Conversation. The final episode of this show was broadcast in spring 2020.

Allen won the Gold Award at the 2016 Arqiva Commercial Radio Awards. In a Radio Times poll that year, he was voted readers' tenth favourite male radio voice.

In 2006 and 2007, he embarked on a live tour visiting theatres around the London area. In 2009 and 2010, Allen continued his sell out 'audience with' stage shows at the Queen's Theatre in Hornchurch and at the Mermaid Theatre in Central London. He was supported by fellow LBC presenter Anthony Davis. In February 2011, he performed again at the Mermaid Theatre, supported by mind-reader Graham P Jolley.

In 2015, Allen released a book entitled So You Want to be a Celebrity?.

== Style of radio show ==
Allen did not take listeners' calls during his programmes, although he did read out texts and tweets. His early breakfast shows involved discussion of stories from the day's newspapers, Allen's personal anecdotes, his gripes about daily life, and his often critical and derogatory comments about celebrities. Writing in The Guardian, David Hepworth observed that "listening to him is like being taken to the airport by an opinionated cabbie who doesn't require you to respond in any way."

== Controversy and criticism ==
In 2015, the RMT union complained to Ofcom that Allen's comments about striking London Underground workers were "likely to encourage or incite crime". Ofcom's investigation found that Allen did not breach the Broadcasting Code.

In 2018, Ofcom found that Allen's comments about the traveller community had breached the Broadcasting Code. LBC argued that "listeners would have considered these comments in the context of Steve's familiar style of fast-moving, continuous rhetoric that rarely dwells significantly on any subject." In the same year, he was also found to have breached the code by appearing to mock a blind BBC journalist's guide horse.

In 2021, Allen's comments about Tilly Ramsay, who was appearing in Strictly Come Dancing, were the subject of some media attention. Ofcom received 860 complaints, which were not upheld "given the brevity of the comments and the likely audience's expectations of this provocative presenter and programme".

== Television experience ==
Allen was one of the presenters of 5's Company, a magazine programme broadcast on Channel 5 when it was launched in 1997.

== Personal life ==
He has been diagnosed as diabetic and has since promoted testing on and off air.
