= United Biscuits Network =

Corporate radio station in the United Kingdom

- Osterley; United Kingdom
- Broadcast area: United Biscuits factories across the United Kingdom

Programming
- Format: Popular music and speech

Ownership
- Owner: United Biscuits

History
- First air date: 1 September 1970
- Last air date: 16 December 1979

United Biscuits Network (UBN) was an internal radio station serving the factories of United Biscuits (UB) in Britain that operated from 1970 to 1979.

In 1970 the BBC had a monopoly on radio broadcasting in Britain, although there were a few offshore pirate radio broadcasters, such as Radio Caroline. At one time factories had sought to avoid unnecessary background sound, but during the Second World War psychologists found that light background music (muzak) increased productivity at times it was low, a trend that continued after the war. But as jobs became deskilled and ever more monotonous, muzak became less effective, and staff turnover increased. United Biscuits was affected by this trend; Hector Laing, the managing director in the 1960s, needed to reduce the costs of high staff turnover. Inspired by the success of the pirate stations, Laing hired suitable staff, bought state-of-the-art broadcasting equipment, and set up UBN at UB headquarters in Osterley, western Greater London (later the headquarters of broadcaster Sky UK).

== Description ==
UBN broadcast from Osterley to UB factories in London, Manchester, Liverpool and Glasgow 24 hours a day. Presenters who later achieved wider public recognition included Roger Scott, Roger Day, Adrian Love, Steve Allen, Nicky Horne, Graham Dene, Peter Young, and Dale Winton. The first Programme Director when the station opened in 1970 was Neil Spence, the former pirate Radio London DJ known as Dave Dennis.

Because there were no legal commercial radio stations in 1970, the network became notable in introducing new acts and presenters. In 1972 Independent Local Radio (ILR) was introduced by legislation in the UK; in 1979 the UBN was closed, with ILR played in the factories instead.

Distribution of the "radio" from the Osterley studios to the various factories was via GPO landlines, then 100 V loudspeaker systems in each factory. Each pair of workers had their own loudspeaker and volume control. To accommodate the already high ambient noise levels in the factories, the audio was highly compressed.

UBN's programme content was similar to contemporary commercial radio, except that "commercials" did not promote products but encouraged safe work practice, among other subjects, and music requests were from workers on various production lines.

Programming was similar to BBC Radio 1 and BBC Radio 2, but there were specialist programmes for Asian listeners and Country and western fans in Liverpool and Glasgow.

== Influence ==
As the UBN was the only independent "broadcaster", operated 24 hours a day, and had high quality equipment and musical sources, it was an excellent opportunity for entertainers to rise from small-scale DJ-ing to radio broadcasting; the network was music-oriented, and hosts were allowed a free rein, within reason. Graham Dene, who became a well-known presenter after UBN, was on air on the opening day, 1 September 1970, and later said he "could not believe his luck": "It was like a radio university. We had the best kit, the proper studios. We even had jingles re-recorded from the pirate ship Radio London. It was like seventh heaven: a proper station of our own." Someone who joined at the start was told that if UBN could reduce UB staff turnover by 20%, it would pay for itself; within the first year, turnover dropped by 40%.

The growth of Independent Local Radio ultimately led to the closure of UBN as unnecessary; the many people it trained in broadcasting were available to man the new independent broadcasters. Andrew Ellinas, who broadcast on UBN's last hour on 16 December 1979, said "UBN was the beginning of the golden age of radio. Its legacy lies in every commercial station in the UK."

== In popular culture ==
The Chris Petit film Radio On was partly filmed at the UBN studio. The protagonist is a DJ at an industrial radio station similar to UBN.
