= Chris Skudder =

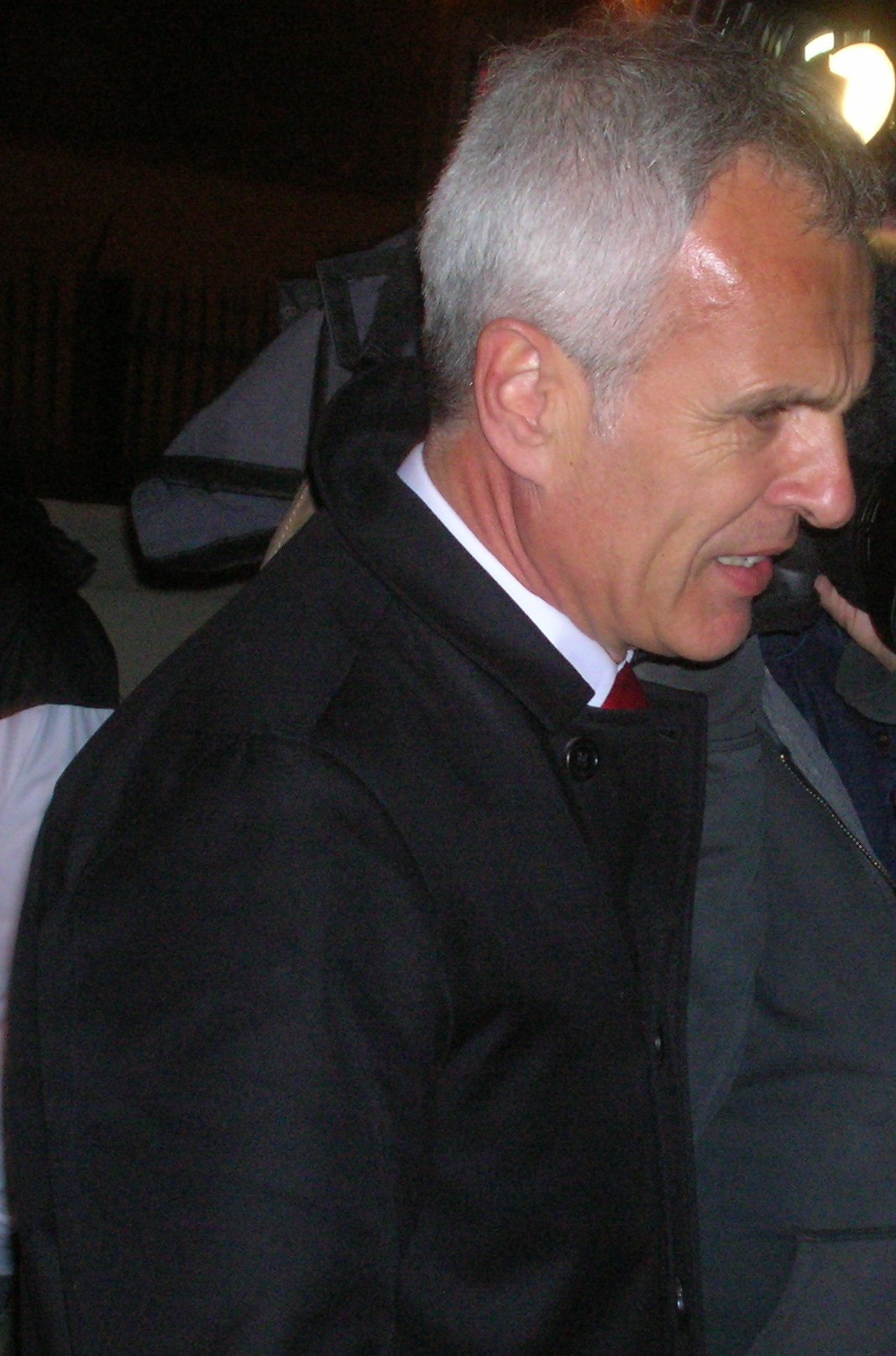
Chris Skudder in 2011

Christopher Skudder (born 1959) is a British broadcast journalist, and sports news broadcaster with ITV.

== Biography ==
Born in Warwickshire and educated at King's Norton Grammar School, his family moved to Wales in 1973 where he then attended Pembroke School, Pembrokeshire. Skudder went up to Goldsmiths College, London, reading French and Drama, and graduated as BA in 1982. He then studied at the IBA National Broadcasting School in London.

He began his career as a local radio disc jockey on Hospital Radio Withybush and sports presenter in South Wales in the mid-1980s, moving on to become sports editor of Ocean Sound, covering Southampton and Portsmouth in Hampshire, then Capital Radio and IRN in London.

Skudder has also contributed popular music reviews for Sky Arts, BSkyB's arts and culture TV channel/website and was a longtime sports presenter and correspondent on Sky News. He covered the football World Cups in the USA (1994), France (1998), Japan (2002), Germany (2006), South Africa (2010), Russia (2018) and Qatar 2022); the European Championships in Belgium/Holland (2000) Portugal (2004) England (2021) and Germany 2024; and Olympic Games in Greece (2004), China (2008), London (2012), Tokyo (2021) and Beijing (2022) working for both Sky News and Sky Sports News followed by freelance stints for FIFA, the IOC and GB News

The BBC's Dan Roan is a friend who he has worked alongside and Skudder is a lifelong supporter of Birmingham City Football Club.
