= John Whitney (broadcaster) =

British broadcaster (1930–2023)

Whitney in 2017

John Norton Braithwaite Whitney, CBE (20 December 1930 – 4 November 2023) was a British writer and producer who was involved in the introduction and development of commercial radio and television in the UK during the 1970s and 1980s. He held various posts such as Managing Director of Capital Radio, Director General of the Independent Broadcasting Authority (IBA), and Chairman of the Royal Academy of Dramatic Art (RADA). In addition he was involved with numerous charities such as Artsline, Stage One, and the Shakespeare Globe Trust, and in 2008 he was appointed Commander of the Order of the British Empire (CBE) for services to broadcasting and charity.

== Early life ==
John Whitney was born into a Quaker family on 20 December 1930, and educated at Leighton Park Friends’ School.

== Career ==
Upon leaving school he started recording bands at dance halls around the county of Buckinghamshire. The BBC turned him down, so instead he started Ross Radio Productions Ltd with Monty Bailey-Watson (an ex-BBC producer) and Joseph Sturge with whom he went to school. The company specialised in creating and producing radio programmes for use by sponsors on the commercial radio station Radio Luxembourg, and became successful as it attracted major advertisers and obtained the UK rights to the Autocue prompting system.

Whitney founded the Local Radio Association to promote UK commercial radio. When the Sound Broadcasting Act 1972 allowed the provision of commercial radio and TV stations in the UK, Whitney became Managing Director of the London-based Capital Radio, with a Board led by Richard Attenborough. Whilst still at Capital Radio he started Sagitta Productions with John Hawkesworth, producing such television series as Upstairs Downstairs, Danger UXB and The Planemakers, as well as a number of single dramas. From 1982 - 1989 Whitney was Director General of the Independent Broadcasting Authority, the UK regulatory authority for commercial TV and radio. During this time the IBA was involved in a dispute with the UK Government over the documentary Death on the Rock and faced the consequences of the Peacock Committee which initiated the system of auctioning franchises for ITV companies. From 1985 to 1986 he was also President of the TRIC (The Television and Radio Industries Club).

Upon leaving the IBA Whitney became Managing Director of the Really Useful Group Ltd, a company set up in 1977 by Andrew Lloyd Webber, and eventually became Chairman. Subsequently, he has held numerous posts within broadcasting and was Chairman of RADA (Royal Academy of Dramatic Art) from 2003 until his retirement in 2007. In 2008 Whitney was appointed a CBE for services to broadcasting and charity. He was also made a Fellow of the Radio Academy. He was awarded the fellowship at the Sony Radio Academy Awards ceremony in 1996. He was chairman of the awards committee at the time.

Among numerous roles not connected to broadcasting or stewardship, John Whitney was on the Council for Charitable Support (1989–92), the Executive Committee of the Musicians Benevolent Fund (1995-2001), the Council of the Royal London Aid Society (1966–90), President of the London Marriage Guidance Council (1983–90), Chairman of the Trustees of Soundaround - National Sound Magazine for the Blind (1981-2000, when he was made Life President) and Chairman of the charity Artsline (1983-2000, being made Life President in 2001). He was also a Patron of the charity Stage One, and a Member of the Shakespeare's Globe Council.

== Personal life and death ==
Whitney married Roma Duncan, an original member of the Festival Ballet, in 1956. They had a daughter, Fiona, who is a Schools Consultant, author and television/theatre producer in Los Angeles, and a son, Alexander, who is a publisher.

John Whitney died on 4 November 2023, at the age of 92.

== Publications ==
Whitney, John (23 October 2013). To Serve the People. John Libbey Publishing. ISBN 978-0861967100.
