= Capital South =

- Fareham; United Kingdom
- Broadcast area: Hampshire and Sussex
- Frequencies: DAB: 11B NOW Digital Bournemouth; DAB: 10B NOW Digital Sussex; DAB: 11C NOW Digital S Hampshire; FM: 103.2 MHz Hampshire; FM: 107.2 MHz Brighton
- RDS: CAPITAL
- Branding: The South Coast's No.1 Hit Music Station; Brighton's No.1 Hit Music Station

Programming
- Format: Contemporary hit radio
- Network: Capital

Ownership
- Owner: Global

History
- First air date: 6 April 2019; 7 years ago

Links
- Webcast: Global Player
- Website: Capital South Coast Capital Brighton

Capital South is a regional radio station owned and operated by Global as part of the Capital network. It broadcasts to Hampshire and Sussex.

The station launched on 6 April 2019, following the merger of Capital Brighton and Capital South Coast.

== Overview ==
The regional station originally broadcast as two separate stations.

- Ocean Sound began broadcasting to Hampshire in October 1986, after taking over the licence previously held by Radio Victory. The FM service for the West of the region was subsequently split off and relaunched as Power FM in December 1988, before becoming part of the Galaxy network in November 2008 and latterly, the Capital network in January 2011.
- Surf 107 began broadcasting to Brighton and Hove in March 1998, subsequently relaunching as 'Juice 107.2' in 2001. The station was sold to Global from UKRD on 17 January 2018 for an undisclosed amount. The station closed down at midnight on 14 August 2018 and relaunched part of the Capital network in September 2018.

On 26 February 2019, Global confirmed the two Capital stations would be merged, following Ofcom's decision to relax local content obligations from commercial radio.

As of April 2019, regional output consists of a three-hour Drivetime show from Fareham on weekdays, alongside localised news bulletins, traffic updates and advertising for the two areas.

== Programming ==
All programming is broadcast and produced from Global's London headquarters.

Global's newsroom broadcasts hourly localised news updates from 6am-6pm on weekdays and 8am-12pm at weekends.
