= Hector Laing, Baron Laing of Dunphail =

British businessman (1923–2010)

The Right Honourable The Lord Laing of Dunphail FRSE FRSA

Member of the House of Lords
- Lord Temporal
- Life peerage 8 February 1991 – 21 June 2010

Personal details
- Born: 12 May 1923
- Died: 21 June 2010 (aged 87)

Hector Laing, Baron Laing of Dunphail, FRSE, FRSA (12 May 1923 – 21 June 2010) was a Scottish businessman.

The son of Hector Laing Sr and Margaret Norrie Grant was educated at the Loretto School in Musselburgh and Jesus College, Cambridge. Laing served as a tank commander in the Scots Guards between 1942 and 1947, and reached the rank of a Captain. He was mentioned in dispatches and awarded the US Bronze Star during campaign in France in 1944–45.

Laing followed his father, and grandfather Sir Alexander Grant, inventor of the digestive biscuit, into the McVitie & Price biscuit business and in 1947 became a director. The company merged to form United Biscuits, and Laing became managing director in 1964 and served as chairman from 1972 to 1990.

From 1973 to 1991, Laing was Director of the Bank of England. He was Director of the Exxon Corporation from 1984 to 1994.

Laing married Marian Clare, daughter of John Emilius Laurie in 1950; they had three sons.

He was knighted in 1978 and was created a Conservative life peer as Baron Laing of Dunphail, of Dunphail in the County of Moray on 8 February 1991. Laing was also a Fellow of the Royal Society of Edinburgh.

Laing also received an Honorary Doctorate from Heriot-Watt University in 1986.

Lord Laing died on 21 June 2010 after a short illness. Lady Laing died in 2020.

== Arms ==
Coat of arms of Hector Laing, Baron Laing of Dunphail
Coronet Coronet of a Baron Crest A Dexter Cubit Arm issuant sleeved per pale Or and Gules, cuff counter-changed, grasping a Dagger proper, hilted and pommelled Or, all palewise. Escutcheon Per Pale Or and Gules, a Chief counter-changed. Supporters On either side a Pekinese Dog guardant proper. Motto I STAND
