= Roger Scott =

British radio disc jockey

- Born: 23 October 1943; Chipping Barnet, England
- Died: 31 October 1989 (aged 46); Buckinghamshire, England
- Occupation: Disc jockey
- Years active: 1966–1989
- Spouse: Lesley Scott
- Children: 2

Roger Scott (23 October 1943 – 31 October 1989) was a British radio disc jockey. He was best known for presenting an afternoon radio show on Capital London from 1973 until 1988 and a late night Sunday show, Scott on Sunday on BBC Radio 1 until his death from stomach cancer.

== Early life ==
Roger Scott was born in Chipping Barnet in 1943, and grew up in Surbiton. He developed an early love of the rock and roll music being created at the end of the 1950s and early 1960s. As a teenager, he began playing records out the window of his suburban London home and watching the reaction of passers-by to the music.

== Early career ==
After a brief time as a merchant seaman, Scott found his way to the United States and joined the radio station WPTR in Albany, New York in 1966. Scott's job, based on his British accent, was to be 'friend of the Beatles', and Scott learned the craft of disc jockey, working with Boom Boom Brannigan and other legendary names at the station. Eight months later, he left WPTR to become the evening presenter at the Montreal station 1470 CFOX. From 1967 to 1971, he was known by listeners for his on-air antics and for his passionate love of music. Notable during this time was his participation in "Give Peace a Chance", recorded by John Lennon with Yoko Ono during their Bed-In for Peace at the Queen Elizabeth Hotel in Montreal.

Anticipating the launch of legal land-based commercial radio, Scott returned to the UK in 1971, only to find the introduction was not as advanced as he had anticipated. Meanwhile, he secured a position at UBN, a closed-circuit station broadcasting music to all the United Biscuits factories nationwide. It was about this time he also had a brief stint on BBC Radio 1 but, anticipating a future in commercial radio, he did so under the pseudonym 'Bob Baker'.

In 1975, he and Tim Rice were resident team captains on a short-lived BBC television pop quiz programme, 'Disco!', hosted by Terry Wogan and broadcast on Sunday afternoons. He did not enjoy working on television, and the show finished after only one series.

== Capital London ==
In 1973, Scott joined the original on-air line-up of London's Capital London. His afternoon drive-time shows became immensely popular with Londoners, generating such landmark features as the 'Three O'Clock Thrill', 'Beat the Intro' (where callers were asked to name a song before the vocals had started) and the daily 'Hitline', together with the jingle 'Grab a little piece of heaven' by David Dundas. In 1976, his regular Friday rush-hour oldies show "Cruising", first broadcast at weekends in 1973, acquired a cult following, largely owing to his introduction of obscure rock-a-billy records to his London audience for the first time. He was also one of the first people in the British media to popularise the music of Bruce Springsteen.

It was also during this time that Roger Scott helped champion the Knebworth Rock Festival in 1980. The Festival's Headliner was the Beach Boys who had just released their latest album titled "Keeping the Summer Alive". Scott was always a big supporter of the West Coast Beach Boys influence on modern popular music and in anticipation of the Rock Festival and also a series of two concerts at the Empire Pool (now the Wembley Arena), Scott had listeners vote on their all time 15 top Beach Boy Hits of all time. Two subsequent Fridays were used to play back the top songs coupled with some excellent interviews with all the then band members including some insightful interviews with band member, and producer at the time, Bruce Johnston. Additionally, Scott included one of the Wembley concerts in his Friday night live concert series.

Scott disdained the standardised playlists, market and audience research and other techniques introduced by the commercial stations in the 1980s.

== Leaked Beatles session tapes ==
Roger Scott was also the source of many unreleased Beatles session tapes that were issued on bootlegs. Scott was working alongside EMI engineer John Barrett on a media presentation called The Abbey Road Video Show in 1982–83. Barrett had already done a full review of all existing Beatles session tapes and during production, Barrett compiled several tapes for the presentation. Roger Scott was chosen to narrate the special. It's this project that Scott worked on that gave him access to the tapes. In later years Barrett, who died in 1984 (and also Beatles historian Mark Lewisohn) had been accused as the source of the leaked recordings. Barrett (nor Lewisohn) never leaked anything; it was his compilations of tapes, copies of which were made by Scott, that got leaked.

Scott actually used some of the tracks from these dubs in 1984 for a 12-hour radio show on the Beatles entitled "Sgt. Pepper's Lonely Hearts Club Band". This material subsequently appeared (taken directly from the radio show syndication transcription discs) on the bootleg NEMS release "Not For Sale" in early 1985. After Scott got diagnosed with stomach cancer, he sold the tapes to some bootleggers for some extra cash shortly before his death. The majority of the leaked Beatles EMI material came from Scott. One set has been confirmed to have been sold to Dieter Schubert of bootleg label The Swingin' Pig.

== BBC Radio 1 ==
In June 1988, after fifteen years of broadcasting with Capital, he moved to commercial-free BBC Radio 1. There, he reached a national audience for the first time, presenting a Saturday afternoon show The Saturday Sequence and a late night Sunday show, Scott on Sunday. The Saturday show featured interviews with many artists, and during this time Scott interviewed Dion, Jackson Browne, Don Henley and many others. The Sunday shows were more eclectic, featuring 1950's rock'n'roll, soul, classic rock and more contemporary music. In 1989 he also began the Classic Albums series for Radio 1. The show and Scott were remembered on a dedicated Radio 1 Vintage tribute show introduced by Richard Skinner on 30 September 2017.

== Personal life and death ==
Scott and his wife, Lesley, had two children.

A heavy smoker, Scott was diagnosed with terminal stomach cancer in the summer of 1988. His last Radio 1 broadcast was on 8 October 1989, with 'Heroes and Villains' by the Beach Boys as the final song, and his last words were: "Thank you for your company, thank you for your support and thank you for your kindness". He died in the Chiltern District of Buckinghamshire on 31 October 1989, at the age of 46.

== Tributes ==
In December 1989, a tribute to him was recorded and broadcast on Radio 1, compered by Alan Freeman, with performances from Cliff Richard, Dave Edmunds and Nick Lowe, Mark Knopfler, Chris Rea, and Mark Germino, whose single 'Rex Bob Lowenstein' had been a particular favourite of Scott.

In 2010, the internationally syndicated radio show It's Only Rock 'n' Roll broadcast a two-part tribute to Roger Scott. Hosted by Alex East and featuring interviews with his friends and former colleagues: Jan Ravens, Dave Cash, Marc Denis, John Sachs, Mick Brown, Nicky Horne and Paul Burnett. It aired on radio stations around the world in the spring of 2010.
