= Michael Bukht =

British commercial radio executive

Michael Bukht OBE
- Born: 10 September 1941; Resolven, Wales
- Died: 4 August 2011 (aged 69); Kent, England
- Education: King's College London
- Occupation: Commercial radio executive

Mirza Michael John Bukht OBE (10 September 1941 – 4 August 2011) was a British commercial radio executive. Under the pseudonym Michael Barry, he was a chef and television personality who was a regular co-presenter on the BBC2 television show Food and Drink. He was appointed an Officer of the Order of the British Empire (OBE) in the 1996 Birthday Honours "for services to Radio and Television Broadcasting."

== Education and background ==
Barry was educated at The Haberdashers' Aske's Boys' School and at King's College London (BA). His father was a Pakistani diplomat while his Welsh mother was from Resolven in Southern Wales.

== Career ==
From 1973 to 1997 he was the Programme controller for Capital Radio, GWR Group Radio, Classic FM, Jamaica Broadcasting and the Principal of the National Broadcasting School. The first programme controller of Capital Radio and of Classic FM (the format of which and music library was compiled by Robin Ray), he had also worked for Kent's Invicta FM.

He spent time during the early 1980s on the Wild Coast of the now defunct Republic of Transkei, setting up the now defunct Capital Radio 604, where he moonlighted as the Capital Crafty Cook. He was regarded by those South African broadcasters who worked under his tutelage as having mentored a generation of highly professional radio presenters. Inane patter was his nemesis. His mantra: "If you've nothing to say, segway!" In 1997 he gave up his full-time work with Classic FM because of a stress-related illness.

He was perhaps best known by the general public as a regular co-presenter on the BBC2 television show Food and Drink in the late 1980s and 1990s, where he was the series' regular chef. He was sometimes known as 'The Crafty Cook' for his frequent use of the adjective 'crafty' to describe his cooking technique. He wrote several books on cooking, including Michael Barry's Food and Drink Cookbook.

He was a Fellow of The Radio Academy, and lived in Kent.

Bukht died on 4 August 2011, after suffering for some time from ill health, survived by his partner Jennie Jones, his son and his three daughters.
