= Graham Dene =

British radio personality

- Born: 7 April 1949 (age 77)
- Occupation: Radio personality

Signature
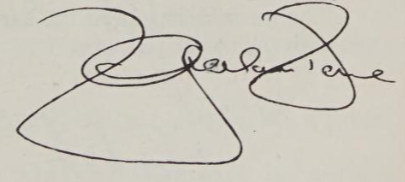

Graham Dene (born 7 April 1949) is a British radio personality.

== Biography ==
After a period as a disc jockey on Edgware General Hospital's radio, and at United Biscuits Network, he became famous in the London area as Capital Radio's breakfast presenter in the 1970s, having joined from Radio City in Liverpool. He took over the breakfast show from Kenny Everett in May 1975, and stayed there until Mike Smith took over the slot in July 1980. When Smith left to rejoin BBC Radio 1 in 1982, Dene returned for a second stint as breakfast host, staying until March 1987 when Chris Tarrant took over.

For several years in the 1980s, Dene hosted a radio show, Rock Over London, that was produced and distributed to radio stations in the United States, particularly stations that programmed New Wave or new, eclectic music.

Dene joined the original Virgin Radio 1215 at its launch in April 1993. In 2006, he worked at Magic 105.4. In 2008, he was 102.2 Smooth Radio's breakfast host. Dene was also a presenter for BBC Radio Devon and BBC Jersey on its Sunday afternoons chart show. In April 2012, Dene was one of the launch presenters on The Wireless – an Internet-based radio station operated by Age UK and aimed at older people throughout the UK. From January 2013 he presented the Saturday lunchtime show on BBC Sussex and BBC Surrey.

In January 2021 it was announced that Graham Dene would be joining the new UK radio station Boom Radio. He launched the station on Sunday 14 February at 10:00am, and presents the weekday breakfast show.

== Bibliography ==
- Dene, Graham (1979). "Contributor". David Jacob's Book of Celebrities' Jokes & Anecdotes. By Jacobs, David. Robson Books. p. 39. ISBN 0860511251.

Media offices
Preceded by Tony Blackburn	Smooth Radio weekend breakfast show presenter 2010	Succeeded by Pat Sharp
