= Capital London =

Capital
- London; United Kingdom
- Broadcast area: Greater London
- Frequencies: DAB: 12C (London 1); FM: 95.8 MHz (London)
- RDS: Capital
- Branding: London's No.1 Hit Music Station

Programming
- Format: Contemporary hit radio
- Network: Capital FM network

Ownership
- Owner: Global
- Sister stations: Capital Cymru; Capital Liverpool; Capital Manchester and Lancashire; Capital Mid-Counties; Capital Midlands; Capital North East; Capital North West and Wales; Capital Scotland; Capital South; Capital South Wales; Capital Yorkshire; Capital UK; Capital Xtra

History
- First air date: 16 October 1973; 52 years ago
- Former frequencies: AM: 557 kHz (1973–1975); AM: 1548 kHz (1975–1988)

Technical information
- ERP: 4 kW
- HAAT: 271 m (889 ft)
- Transmitter coordinates: 51.4094°N 0.0855°W

Links
- Webcast: Global Player
- Website: www.capitalfm.com/london

Capital London is an Independent Local Radio station owned and operated by Global Media & Entertainment as part of its national Capital Network.

As Capital Radio it was launched in the London area in 1973 as one of Britain's first two commercial radio stations. Its brief was to entertain, while its opposite number, London Broadcasting (LBC), was licensed to provide news and information. In search of a larger audience in 1974, Capital Radio rapidly moved from a general and entertainment station with drama, features, documentaries and light music to a more successful pop music-based format.

In 1988 it became two stations: 95.8 Capital FM and Capital Gold. After some national expansion with the purchase of other radio stations the Capital Radio Group merged with GWR Group in 2005 to form GCap Media which in turn was taken over by Global Radio in 2008. In 2011, Capital was launched nationally, apart from the daily breakfast and weekday drivetime shows, becoming part of the Capital FM Network. In 2019, the breakfast show also became national, with 11 regional drivetime shows.

== History ==
=== Pre-launch ===
The Sound Broadcasting Act 1972 allowed for the establishment of local commercial radio stations in the United Kingdom to operate alongside the national radio stations provided by the BBC.

In October 1972 the Independent Broadcasting Authority invited applications for two local radio licences in London: one for a general and entertainment station, the other for news and information.

The licence for the entertainment service saw eight organisations applying, many of them with established entertainment pedigrees. Associated Television, run by Lew Grade, was one of them, as was the long-established Isle of Man broadcaster Manx Radio. Others were specially formed companies: Piccadilly Radio under the leadership of the film producer Lord Brabourne, Network Broadcasting headed by the writer Lord Willis and the broadcaster Ned Sherrin, the actor and comedian Bernard Braden's London Radio Independent Broadcasters and London Independent Broadcasting which included the impresario Robert Stigwood, the then radio producer John Whitney, the record and electronics company EMI, and Mecca Leisure Group. The theatre director Peter Hall supported Artists in Radio.

The successful franchisee, however, was Capital Radio Limited. This company, with shareholders including Rediffusion Radio Holdings Limited, Local News of London Limited and The Observer (Holdings) Limited was headed as chairman by the actor and film director Richard Attenborough. Other board members at that time included record producer George Martin, actor and film director Bryan Forbes, theatrical producer Peter Saunders, and a millionaire dentist and long-time commercial radio enthusiast Barclay Barclay-White. By the time of Capital Radio's launch in October 1973 some of the competitors for the licence such as Lord Willis and John Whitney had joined the board.

Test transmissions by the IBA commenced in January 1973 using the VHF frequency 95.8 MHz for FM from the Croydon transmitter and the MW frequency 557 kHz (539 m) for AM from London Transport's Lots Road Power Station, Chelsea. The location of the medium-wave transmitter and the frequency used were only temporary until a new high-powered medium-wave station at Saffron Green, Barnet, was completed.

In the meantime Capital Radio set about obtaining premises from which to broadcast and employing staff and on-air personnel, setting up temporary headquarters at 96 Piccadilly in London's Mayfair. Michael Bukht was appointed programme controller, Aidan Day head of Music and Ron Onions head of News, while Gerry O'Reilly was appointed Chief Engineer.

=== Launch ===
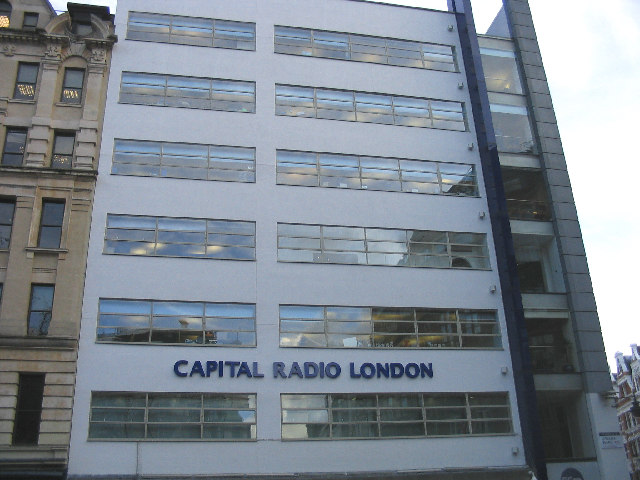
Capital Radio's headquarters in London's Leicester Square

On 16 October 1973 Capital commenced regular transmissions with the British national anthem "God Save the Queen", then a message from director Richard Attenborough "...Good morning, this, for the very first time, is Capital Radio" followed by the Capital Radio theme jingle, made by Blue Mink:

"Isn't it good to know,
Capital Radio
You can turn on a friend, you can turn on a show,
you can turn on the world with Capital Radio
Such a good way to make your day
Capital sounds go round and round,
London town, up and down.
The brightest sound in London town
Capital Radio in tune with London (yeah)"...

Simon & Garfunkel's song "Bridge over Troubled Water" followed the jingle. The first radio commercial came from Birds Eye fish fingers, which was also the first ever legal radio commercial on LBC.

Capital's programming remit, as with all ILR stations at the time, was to appeal to the broadest range of people as possible, which included specialist music programmes, radio plays, classical music, community features and news documentaries. The host of Capital's first show was former BBC Light Programme and former BBC Radio 1 presenter David Symonds. After Symonds moved to the Capital Countdown show, he was replaced at breakfast by the former Radio London partnership of Kenny Everett and Dave Cash (known for The Kenny & Cash Show).

Immediately after going on air, Capital Radio suffered co-channel interference from Radio Veronica, a pirate radio station off the coast of the Netherlands. Veronica began broadcasting in the 1960s and it was suggested that the allocation of 539 metres to ILR may have been an attempt to block reception of overseas broadcasts – a battle which preceded the launch of BBC Radio 1. Capital finally moved into office blocks in Euston Tower in September 1973, just a few yards away from Thames Television headquarters. Euston Tower was, at the time, London's tallest office tower.

In 1975, the IBA opened the transmission facilities at Saffron Green which allowed both LBC and Capital Radio to move up the dial. Capital moved to 1548 kHz mediumwave (194 m) and LBC to 1152 kHz (261 m). Saffron Green needed to be highly configured as it was sharing the same frequency as other ILR stations and needed to prevent co-channel interference from new ILR stations in Birmingham and Manchester. Previously the aerial wire suspended between the towers of Lots Road site gained Capital and LBC the semi-humorous nickname of "Radio Clothesline" however both stations could be heard as far away as the Midlands. FM reception remained unaltered.

=== Capital in danger (1974–75) ===
Capital continued broadcasting, having been a 24-hour station from the beginning. The so-called 'needle-time' restrictions on playing recorded music were eased, which meant it could play more of it, although they were not abolished entirely until 1988.

==== Charities and the Flying Eye ====
They're even worse because they had the chance, coming right into the heart of London and sitting in that tower right on top of everything. But they've completely blown it. I'd like to throttle Aiden Day. He thinks he's the self appointed Minister of Public Enlightenment. We've just written a new song called Capital Radio and a line in it goes "listen to the tunes of the Dr Goebbels Show". They say "Capital Radio in tune with London". Yeah, yeah, yeah! They're in tune with Hampstead. They're not in tune with us at all. I hate them. What they could have done compared to what they have done is abhorrent. They could have made it so good that everywhere you went you took your transistor radio – you know, how it used to be when I was at school. I'd have one in my pocket all the time or by my ear'ole flicking it between stations. If you didn't like one record you'd flick to another station and then back again. It was amazing. They could have made the whole capital buzz. Instead Capital Radio has just turned their back on the whole youth of the city.

— Joe Strummer

The mid-1970s saw Capital Radio expand with the launch of the Help a London Child charity, which aimed to raise money for London's poorest children. The charity appeal went on to become one of the longest-running in broadcasting and the most recognised in British radio. In recognition of this, Network Southeast named British Rail Class 47 47710 "Capital Radio's Help a London Child", in August 1991. In 1976, Capital Radio, Thames Television, London Weekend Television and British Telecom launched the Capital Radio Helpline which helped listeners through matters ranging from how to cook a turkey at Christmas time to suicide prevention. In this era the station also lent its support to London-based orchestras, choral societies, the British Film Institute Children's Film Festival and many other ventures.

1976 saw the launch of the Flying Eye, a traffic-spotting light aircraft, which could see traffic congestion below on the streets of Central London. LBC also had a similar service but was forced to suspend operations due to cost. Capital's aircraft was originally a Piper Seneca model, and, later, a twin-engined Grumman Cougar.

=== Music Power (1980s) ===
Music Power sticker

Charlie Gillett had his world music programme The World of Difference on Sunday evenings. Several of Capital's early presenters had moved on, to be replaced by newer disc jockeys, some of whom had experience presenting on Radio Luxembourg. Although it would only broadcast for three years, the Mike Allen hip hop show was influential during this time to bring the new music culture to the UK.

In 1987, a new programme controller Richard Park, oversaw an overhaul of Capital's output from a full-service station to a music-intensive CHR format, which proved highly successful. The revamp was underlined by a new on-air imaging package, known as 'Music Power'.

=== One becomes two: the frequency split (1986–96) ===
Capital FM's sun logo was also used by other stations owned by the Capital Radio Group.

As part of an IBA experiment in split broadcasting on Independent Local Radio, in 1986, Capital runs a Sunday daytime service called CFM, broadcasting a more contemporary mix of music than normally broadcast by the station. This was precursor to the Broadcasting Act 1990 which required all ILR stations to permanently split simulcasting output on both its AM and FM frequencies in order to create new local radio stations and improve choice. Capital responded in 1988 by launching a golden oldies station called Capital Gold, initially at the weekend prior to going full time on 1 November, on its AM frequency while Capital on FM became 95.8 Capital FM, a chart contemporary music station. Both stations received brand-new jingle packages from Californian jingle house Who Did That Music (later Groove Addicts, now GrooveWorx), that went on to become well known and essential parts of its music programming.

=== 1997–2010 ===
Since 1997, the studios of 95.8 Capital FM have been based in Leicester Square, which is also home to Capital's parent company, Global. The studio complex is shared with many other stations, including Heart, Smooth Radio, Classic FM, Capital XTRA, Radio X, LBC and Gold.

The station launched its website in September 1996 resulting in high demand which led to it crashing within a few hours.

Beginning in late 2005, the station went through a number of changes. In December 2005, Chris Brooks moved from weekend breakfast to host 1–4 in the afternoon and Richard Bacon presenting The Go Home Show between 4–7. A new policy started of two advertisements in each break to win favour with listeners, though there were more frequent breaks as a result. This policy was changed within a few months.

Capital rebranded under its original name in January 2006.

On 9 January 2006, the station was relaunched under its original name Capital Radio, with a modified line-up of presenters and a slightly tweaked music format. After this re-launch turned out not to have had the desired success, a new Programme Controller was appointed that September. Scott Muller came from the Nova group in Australia, and the station saw another tweak in style.

The changes continued seeing Capital re-branded back to "London's Hit Music Station", a play on the station's earlier brand of "London's Number One Hit Music Station" with noticeable improvements – leading to a rise in audience figures at the end of 2006. The station also changed its on-air name to 95.8 Capital Radio, incorporating the frequency of "95.8" back into the station since it was dropped at the January 2006 re-launch.

In March 2007, the station was then renamed Capital 95.8 and its slogan became "The Sound of London". The marketing campaign combined outdoor, cinema, and print adverts.

RAJAR figures for Q2 2007 showed Capital 95.8 slipping to fourth place in the London local radio market ratings, recording the lowest-ever share of the London audience and for the first time falling behind Emap-owned station Magic and Heart, now owned by Global. Capital 95.8's audience share slipped from 4.6 to 4.1 per cent over the quarter.

The station then returned to the "London's Hit Music Network" tagline on 10 December 2007, with ex-Absolute Radio presenter Greg Burns replacing Lucio on drivetime, and Lucio moving to the evening show. Lucio took over from Bam Bam (Peter Poulton) who left Capital in early December 2007. On 6 June 2008, Global completed its £375 million takeover of Capital's owner GCap Media.

=== 2011–present ===
On 3 January 2011, the Capital brand began to be rolled out across the UK when Capital London became a founder member of a nine-station Capital network as part of a merger of the Global owned Hit Music and Galaxy networks and with the exception of weekday breakfast and drivetime plus weekend mornings, all output was simulcast with the rest of the network.

On 12 May 2011 it was announced that 95.8 Capital remained the most-listened-to commercial radio station in London, on both share and reach, beating rival Magic 105.4. However, on 4 August that year it was announced that rival Magic 105.4 had overtaken the position.

As of April 2019, only one programme – weekday drivetime – remains local, with all other programming coming from the national Capital network.

== Notable presenters ==
Capital current presenters:

- Lee Juggurnauth, Monday & Tuesday 1 am–6 am
- Joe Hollywood, weekdays 4 am–6 am & Sunday 9 am–12 pm
- Jordan North, Chris Stark & Sian Welby, weekdays 6 am–10 am (Capital Breakfast)
- Kemi Rodgers, weekdays 10 am–1 pm
- Aimee Vivian, weekdays 1 pm–4 pm
- Will Manning, weekdays 4 pm–7 pm & Sunday 4 pm–7 pm (The Official Big Top 40)
- Jimmy Hill, weekdays 7 pm-10 pm (Capital Evening Show) & 9 am-12 pm
- Sonny Jay, Monday-Thursday 10 pm–1 am (Capital Evening Show) & Saturday 4 pm–7 pm
- Tom Watts, Wednesday-Friday 1 am–4 am & Saturday 7 pm–10 pm
- Kem Cetinay, Friday & Saturday 7 pm–10 pm (Capital Weekender)
- Sam Lavery, Friday & Saturday 10 pm–1 am (Capital Weekender)
- Rebecca Daniels, Saturday & Sunday 1 am–5 am
- Lydia Rodford, Saturday & Sunday 5 am–9 am
- Jay London, Saturday & Sunday 12 pm–4 pm
- Nada Allai, Sunday 10 pm–1 am

== Capital Music Awards ==
The station formerly hosted the Capital Awards, also known as Capital Music Awards.

== See also ==
- Capital (radio network)
- Timeline of Capital Radio
- Capital Breakfast (London)
- Capital Radio One
- List of radio stations in the United Kingdom
- Scorpio Sound
