= Richie Vaculik =

Australian martial artist

Richard Vaculik
- Born: 19 June 1983 (age 43)
- Other names: Richie Vas
- Height: 5 ft 6 in (1.68 m)
- Weight: 125 lb (57 kg; 8.9 st)
- Division: Flyweight (MMA)
- Reach: 69 in (175 cm)
- Style: Greco-Roman wrestling
- Fighting out of: Maroubra, New South Wales
- Team: TP Fight Team
- Rank: Brown belt in Brazilian Jiu-Jitsu
- Years active: 2006–present

Mixed martial arts record
- Total: 15
- Wins: 10
- By knockout: 3
- By submission: 6
- By decision: 1
- Losses: 5
- By knockout: 2
- By submission: 1
- By decision: 2

Other information
- Mixed martial arts record from Sherdog

Richie Vaculik (/ˈvæsəlɪk/ VAS-ə-lik; born Richard Vaculik) is a mixed martial artist and big wave surfer from Maroubra, Australia. Richie competed in the Ultimate Fighting Championship (UFC) Flyweight division.

== Early life ==
Vaculic was born in Sydney to a Czech immigrant father and an English mother from Manchester.

Richie's sporting accomplishments started as a surfer at Maroubra Beach, Sydney (Australia). Bra Boys including the Abberton brothers (Sunny Abberton, Koby Abberton, Jai Abberton and Dakota Abberton), Mark Mathews and Richie grew up surfing the iconic Maroubra Beach breaks and other waves including 'Ours'.

In an interview with Surfing Magazine Richie stated that as teenagers he and some Bra Boys would fight each other for fun or to resolve disputes. Richie was introduced to Brazilian jiu-jitsu by blackbelt Bruno Panno at the age of 18.

== Mixed martial arts career ==
=== Early career ===
In November 2006 Richie made a successful MMA debut at Warriors Realm 7 against Michael Mortimer, winning via first-round knockout.

=== Cage Fighting Championship ===
Richie remained undefeated before challenging Gustavo Falciroli for the Cage Fighting Championship (CFC) inaugural bantamweight title at CFC 12, in March 2010, at the Hordern Pavilion. Falciroli defeated Richie via unanimous 5-round decision.

=== Proud Warriors Productions, Australian Fighting Championship and Combat8 ===
Since 2011 Richie has exclusively fought international competition. At Proud Warriors Productions (PWP) 3, September 2011, Richie defeated Hawaiian Justin Wong via first round submission. In February 2012, Richie defeated American Nick Honstein for the inaugural featherweight belt at PWP 4: Vaculik vs Honstein, via first round submission.

At Australian Fighting Championship (AFC) 3, April 2012, Richie defeated American MMA veteran Matt Jaggers via first-round knockout.

Richie also defeated American Charlie Alaniz, via split decision (5 rounds), to capture the Combat8 bantamweight title in mid 2013 in a modified MMA rules event broadcast live via epicentre.tv and delayed broadcast on Fox Sports.

=== Ultimate Fighting Championship ===
In June 2012, Richie was cast on The Ultimate Fighter: The Smashes (TUF Smashes). Richie fought twice at lightweight, he was outsized and defeated by Norman Parke via unanimous decision (2 rounds) and Colin Fletcher via second round submission.

In December 2013, Richie made his UFC and flyweight debut on the undercard at UFC Fight Night: Hunt vs. Bigfoot against Justin Scoggins and was defeated via first-round TKO. In an interview with MMA Kanvas Richie stated he was surprised by Scoggin's wrestling based game plan.

Vaculik was set to face Jon delos Reyes on the undercard at UFC Fight Night: Te Huna vs. Marquardt on 8 June 2014. Reyes was replaced by Philippines' Roldan Sangcha'an. Vaculik he defeated Sangcha-an via unanimous decision.

Vaculik was expected to face Ray Borg on 8 November 2014 at UFC Fight Night 55. However, Borg was unavailable and Neil Seery was officially announced as Richie's opponent. Subsequently, Seery pulled out of that bout as well and was replaced by Louis Smolka. Despite winning the first and second rounds, Vaculik lost the fight via TKO in the third round.

Vaculik faced Danny Martinez on 15 November 2015 at UFC 193. He lost the fight via unanimous decision and was subsequently cut from the UFC in 2016.

== Film and television ==
Richie features in Bra Boys: Blood is Thicker than Water. Macario De Souza directed friends Mark Matthews and Richie in the follow-up documentary Fighting Fear. On The Ultimate Fighter: The Smashes, Richie represented Australia for the first time inside the UFC octagon. The Crew is a successful television series that follows on from Fighting Fear documenting Richie's career in MMA and surfing on Fuel TV.

The three friends Richie, De Souza and Mathews were the subject of an Australian Story episode Scared Straight (2011) where Sue Masters looks into their maturation as professionals in their respective careers and some of the trails and tribulations of getting there.

According to The Daily Telegraph Vas is set to co-anchor a UFC Tonight style show for Fox Sports on Australian pay television network Foxtel alongside Tara Rushton called UFC Fight Week that premiered on Thursday, 16 April 2015.

== Big wave surfing ==
Richie has surfed some of the world's most dangerous breaks including The Right and Shipsterns Bluff (Australia), Hawaii and Teahupo'o (Tahiti). Surfing since the age of 10, he credits the older surfers who pushed him to ride waves out of his comfort zone from an early age. Bra Boys pioneered standup surfing at a local Sydney break called Cape Fear, on the southern side of the Botany Bay at Cape Solander. Known locally as 'Ours', it became the site of a Red Bull big wave surfing competition in August 2014 called Red Bull Cape Fear. Richie competed against fellow local Evan Faulks.

== Championships and accomplishments ==
- Cage Fighting Championship
  - CFC Bantamweight title
- Combat8
  - Combat8 Bantamweight title
- Proud Warriors Productions
  - PWP Featherweight title

== Mixed martial arts record ==
Professional record breakdown
15 matches	10 wins	5 losses
By knockout	3	2
By submission	6	1
By decision	1	2

-

Res.	Record	Opponent	Method	Event	Date	Round	Time	Location	Notes
Loss	10–5	Nobuki Fujii	Submission (rear-naked choke)	Pancrase 289	20 August 2017	1	3:42	Tokyo, Japan	
Loss	10–4	Danny Martinez	Decision (unanimous)	UFC 193	15 November 2015	3	5:00	Melbourne, Australia	
Loss	10–3	Louis Smolka	KO (side kick and punches)	UFC Fight Night: Rockhold vs. Bisping	8 November 2014	3	0:18	Sydney	
Win	10–2	Roldan Sangcha-an	Decision (unanimous)	UFC Fight Night: Te-Huna vs. Marquardt	28 June 2014	3	5:00	Auckland, New Zealand	
Loss	9–2	Justin Scoggins	TKO (punches)	UFC Fight Night: Hunt vs. Bigfoot	7 December 2013	1	4:43	Brisbane, Australia	Flyweight debut.
Win	9–1	Matt Jaggers	TKO (punches)	AFC 3 – Australian Fighting Championship 3	15 December 2012	1	0:41	Melbourne, Australia	
Win	8–1	Nick Honstein	Submission (triangle armbar)	PWP 4 – Vaculik vs. Honstein	2 July 2012	1	0:59	Sydney	Won the PWP Featherweight Championship.
Win	7–1	Justin Wong	Submission (rear-naked choke)	PWP 3 – Proud Warrior Productions 3	27 February 2011	1	5:00	Sydney	
Win	6–1	Glenn Taylor-Smith	Submission (rear-naked choke)	Impact FC 2 – The Uprising: Sydney	20 November 2010	2	2:43	Sydney	
Win	5–1	Evan Byrne	Submission (rear-naked choke)	CFC – Cage Fighting Championships 14	5 June 2010	1	5:00	Sydney	
Loss	4–1	Gustavo Falciroli	Decision (unanimous)	CFC 12 – Lombard vs. Santore	12 March 2010	5	5:00	Sydney	For the CFC Bantamweight Championship.
Win	4–0	Michael Mortimer	Submission (rear-naked choke)	CFC 9 – Fighters Paradise	11 July 2009	1	4:35	Gold Coast, Australia	
Win	3–0	Ross MacLeod	KO (punch)	CFC 7 – Battle at the Big Top	20 February 2009	1	1:59	Sydney	
Win	2–0	Alexandre Shevtsov	Submission (rear-naked choke)	Warriors Realm 8	2 April 2007	2	2:24	Sydney	
Win	1–0	Michael Mortimer	KO (punch)	Warriors Realm 7	8 December 2006	1	1:36	Sydney	

== See also ==
- The Crew
- Fighting Fear
- Bra Boys: Blood is Thicker than Water
- List of current UFC fighters
- List of male mixed martial artists
