= The Crew (Australian TV series) =

- Genre: Sport/documentary
- Starring: Richie Vaculik, Mark Matthews, Kid Mac
- Country of origin: Australia
- Original language: English
- No. of seasons: 2
- No. of episodes: 10

Production
- Camera setup: Multiple-camera setup
- Running time: 90 minutes (including commercials)

Original release
- Network: Fuel TV
- Release: 10 February 2013

The Crew is an Australian TV show, which follows three friends through life chasing their dreams.

== See also ==
- Fighting Fear
- Bra Boys: Blood is Thicker than Water
