= Abberton (surname) =

Abberton is an English surname derived from a toponymic. Notable people with the surname include:

- Dakota Abberton, Australian surfer
- Jai Abberton (born c. 1973), Australian surfer
- Koby Abberton (born 1979), Australian surfer
- Sunny Abberton (born c. 1974), Australian surfer
