= Mark Mathews =

Australian professional big wave surfer (born 1983)

Personal information
- Born: Mark Mathews; 16 January 1983 (age 43) New South Wales, Australia
- Years active: 2009–present
- Height: 1.77 m (5 ft 10 in)
- Weight: 75 kg (165 lb)
- Website: markmathews.com

Surfing career
- Sport: Surfing
- Career earnings: $442,651
- Sponsors: O'Neill (brand)

Surfing specifications
- Stance: Natural (regular) foot
- Shapers: Darren Handley and Wade Tokoro
- Favourite waves: any pointbreak
- Favourite maneuvers: Hacks and tubes

Mark Mathews is an Australian professional big wave surfer.

== Early life ==
Mathews was frightened of the ocean as a child and spent his childhood visits with family to the ocean sitting on the beach. Later he grew up surfing at Maroubra, New South Wales with fellow Bra Boys the Abberton brothers and his ambition was to become a big wave surfer.

== Big waves ==
His first surfing of big waves occurred at Shipstern Bluff which saw him featured in photos and videos and gave him his start as a professional when sponsors were attracted.

Mathews has surfed many of the world's biggest waves including Cape Fear, NSW, Teahupoo, Tahiti, Jaws, Maui and The Right, WA.

He has won three Oakley Big Wave Awards:

- 2009 Biggest Wave Ridden;
- 2010 Biggest Slab Award;
- 2011 Biggest Wave Ridden.

== Red Bull Cape Fear 2014 ==
Mathews and fellow professional surfer Ryan Hipwood organised the first Red Bull Cape Fear event in August 2014. The contest is an invitational event with 20 of the world's top big wave specialists from Australia and overseas. Due to its location spectators cannot watch the event but it is broadcast live and free.

== Film and television ==
There have been several films that Mathews has been involved in as himself.

In 2007 Mathews appeared in Bra Boys : Blood is thicker than water, "A film about the cultural evolution of the Sydney beach side suburb of Maroubra and the social struggle faced by its youth - the notorious surf gang known as the Bra Boys."

Fighting Fear (2011) is a documentary involving the friendship of Mathews and Richie Vaculik and the competition between them. Several well known surf stars including Mick Fanning and Kelly Slater also appear as themselves.

Another documentary entitled Immersion the Movie (2012) which was seven years in the making looked at the journey of surfing. Tom Carroll and Kelly Slater are among the many surfers who also appear.

Waveform a short appeared in 2015. Also in 2015 Matthews appeared in an episode of a series Focus: What Drives the World's Top Athletes which featured athletes from many different sports.

He also featured in an episode of ABC's Australian Story called Scared Straight about a documentary being produced about the Bra Boys. He appeared in episodes of The Crew with Richie Vaculik and Macario De Souza.

Mathews appeared in two Australian big wave films featuring Kelly Slater, Journey and Encoded (2014).

== Major injury ==
On 25 October 2016 Mathews was working on a photographic shoot on the south coast of New South Wales when he was injured. He was being double towed in 6–8 foot waves when he was caught in a wave and landed feet first on a reef. He suffered, " a broken leg, a dislocated knee, two snapped ligaments, major nerve damage, and an artery that tore lengthways, filling his leg with blood" and he was fortunate not to have his leg amputated.

In an interview in February 2017 Mathews admitted that the injury may end his career as doctors had advised that nerve damage may stop him from surfing in his usual style.

Mathews hopes to one day surf again and is undergoing physiotherapy, yoga and foundation training. He suffers from drop foot which means he can no longer lift one foot and is hoping to use a custom built brace to assist with this disability. A custom built knee brace is also being designed to assist him in the water.

== Personal life ==
Mathews is a supporter of his hometown rugby league club the South Sydney Rabbitohs.
