= Henry Bell =

Henry Bell may refer to:

- Henry Bell (architect) (1647–1711), English architect
- Henry Bell (engineer) (1767–1830), Scottish engineer, introduced the first successful passenger steamboat service in Europe
- Henry Glassford Bell (1803–1874), Scottish lawyer poet and historian
- Henry Nugent Bell (1792–1822), Irish genealogist
- Henry H. Bell (1808–1868), American admiral
- Henry Lawrie Bell (1929–1984), Australian Army officer
- Henry Bell (American football) (born 1937), American Football League player
- Henry Thomas Mackenzie Bell (1856–1930), English writer
- Henry Hesketh Bell (1864–1952), British colonial administrator and author
- Henry Bell (cricketer) (1838–1919), English cricketer and Anglican clergyman
- Henry Bell (rugby union) (born 1999), New Zealand rugby union player

== See also ==
- Harry Bell (disambiguation)
- Henry Bell Cisnero (born 1982), Cuban volleyball player
- Henry Bell Gilkeson (1850–1921), American lawyer, politician, educator, school administrator, and banker
