= Harry Bell =

Harry Bell may refer to:

- Henry Lawrie Bell (1929–1984), Australian ornithologist
- Harry Bell (footballer, born 1862) (1862–1948), English footballer for West Bromwich Albion
- Harry Bell (footballer, born 1924) (1924–2014), English footballer for Middlesbrough and Darlington and Minor Counties cricketer for Durham
- Harry Bell (Australian footballer) (1897–1980), Australian rules footballer
- Harry Bell (ice hockey) (1925–2009), defenceman who played for the New York Rangers
- Harry Bell (Medal of Honor) (1860–1938), Medal of Honor recipient
- Harry M. Bell, American football and basketball coach
- Harry Charles Purvis Bell (1851–1937), British civil servant

== See also ==
- Harold Bell (1919–2009), American marketer
- Henry Bell (disambiguation)
