= Abberton =

Abberton may refer to:

== People ==
- Abberton (surname)

== Places ==
- Abberton, Essex, village in England
- Abberton Reservoir, reservoir in Essex, England
- Abberton, Worcestershire, village in England
