= FTW Revolution =

Australian mental health organisation

FTW Revolution is a company dedicated to the mental health and suicide prevention of the youth of Australia by encouraging and inspiring them through art, music and sport. Co-founded by the late Matt Dee in 2014, FTW has associated with Suicide Prevention Australia (SPA) serving as a link between people with mental health issues and the different services provided by SPA.

FTW is currently developing a mood tracker and mental health app in order to reach younger audience (fifteen to forty four years old) that accordingly to the Australian Institute of Health and Welfare (AIHW) Authoritative information and statistics to promote better health and well-being, is the most vulnerable demographic to attempt suicide. The FTW app's aim is contributing on the research of mental health as it will storage users data, deliver content entertainment, and link suicide prevention services as Lifeline (crisis support service) and counsellors. FTW's goal with this app is addressing suicide by being proactive as opposed to reactive and therefore decrease suicide statistics in Australia and globally.

FTW is represented by many ambassadors, such as: the big waves surfers Justen "JugHead" Allport and Koby Abberton, base jumper Bobby MC Entee, MotoX driver Tyson Cherry, Professional rugby player Josh Dugan, and Bondi Rescue lifeguards.
