= Times We Had =

Single by Kid Mac

from the album No Man's Land
- Released: December 14, 2012
- Recorded: 2012
- Genre: Indie rock
- Length: 3:35
- Songwriter(s): Kid Mac
- Producer(s): N. Audino/L. Hughes

"Times We Had" is an alternative song by Kid Mac released on 14 December 2012 from the album No Man's Land. The song, with re-written lyrics, is the theme song of The NRL Footy Show.

An acoustic version of the song was released on Kid Mac's album Acoustic EP.

== Personnel ==
- Kid Mac - Backing vocals, lead guitar
- Andrew Jhavery - Drums
- Antonia Hanna - Lead vocals, lead bass
