= Danny Martinez =

American MMA fighter

- Born: Daniel Eugene Martinez; June 14, 1985 (age 41); Tempe, Arizona, United States
- Other names: The Gremlin
- Height: 5 ft 5 in (1.65 m)
- Weight: 125 lb (57 kg; 8.9 st)
- Division: Flyweight
- Reach: 67 in (170 cm)
- Fighting out of: San Diego, California, United States
- Team: Alliance MMA
- Years active: 2006–present

Mixed martial arts record
- Total: 30
- Wins: 21
- By knockout: 9
- By submission: 4
- By decision: 8
- Losses: 9
- By decision: 9

Other information
- Mixed martial arts record from Sherdog

Daniel Eugene Martinez (born June 14, 1985) is an American mixed martial artist who competes in the flyweight division of Taura MMA. A professional mixed martial artist since 2006, Martinez has also competed in the Ultimate Fighting Championship and Absolute Championship Berkut.

== Biography ==
=== Education ===
Martinez wrestled at Marcos de Niza High School and then attended Pima Community College where he wrestled and trained with the likes of Efraín Escudero, Jamie Varner, and Anthony Birchak.

=== Early MMA career ===
A native Arizonan, Martinez began his mixed martial arts career in 2006, competing first at lightweight and then featherweight in regional promotions, primarily across the Southwestern United States. Martinez faced former UFC title challenger Mark Hominick in 2008, where Hominick defeated Martinez via unanimous decision. Martinez compiled a professional record of 11–2, before facing Joseph Benavidez in a bantamweight bout on December 3, 2008, at WEC 37. Benavidez defeated Martinez via unanimous decision.

Over the next few years, Martinez dropped in weight class to the flyweight division, and also had a brief stint on The Ultimate Fighter 18. Martinez was defeated in an elimination bout by future finalist, Davey Grant.

=== Ultimate Fighting Championship ===
On the heels of a 6–1 run for regional promotions, Martinez signed with the UFC in January 2014. He made his promotional debut as a short notice replacement, filling in for Kyoji Horiguchi against Chris Cariaso on February 1, 2014, at UFC 169. Cariaso defeated Martinez via unanimous decision.

Martinez faced Scott Jorgensen on June 7, 2014, at UFC Fight Night 42. Jorgensen defeated Martinez via unanimous decision. Their performance earned both participants Fight of the Night honors.

Martinez faced promotional newcomer Sirwan Kakai in a bantamweight bout on June 27, 2015, at UFC Fight Night 70. Martinez lost the fight via unanimous decision.

Martinez face Richie Vaculik on November 15, 2015, at UFC 193. He won the fight via unanimous decision.

=== Absolute Championship Berkut ===
Martinez faced Darren Mima on January 13, 2017, at ACB 51. He won the fight by unanimous decision.

Amassing a record of 2–2 after his UFC release, Martinez signed a contract with Taura MMA.

== Championships and Accomplishments ==
- Ultimate Fighting Championship
  - Fight of the Night (One time) vs. Scott Jorgensen

== Mixed martial arts record ==
Professional record breakdown
30 matches	21 wins	9 losses
By knockout	9	0
By submission	4	0
By decision	8	9

Res.	Record	Opponent	Method	Event	Date	Round	Time	Location	Notes
Loss	21–9	Ali Bagautinov	Decision (unanimous)	Fight Nights Global 76: Bagautinov vs. Martinez	October 13, 2017	5	5:00	Krasnodar, Russia	
Loss	21–8	Hiromasa Ougikubo	Decision (unanimous)	Shooto – Professional Shooto 4/23	April 23, 2017	3	5:00	Urayasu, Japan	
Win	21–7	Darren Mima	Decision (unanimous)	ACB 51: Silva vs. Torgeson	January 13, 2017	3	5:00	Irvine, California, United States	
Win	20–7	Benjamin Vinson	Decision (unanimous)	Combate Americas – Combate Ocho	August 11, 2016	3	5:00	Los Angeles, California, United States	
Win	19–7	Richie Vaculik	Decision (unanimous)	UFC 193	November 15, 2015	3	5:00	Melbourne, Australia	
Loss	18–7	Sirwan Kakai	Decision (unanimous)	UFC Fight Night: Machida vs. Romero	June 27, 2015	3	5:00	Hollywood, Florida, United States	Bantamweight bout.
Loss	18–6	Scott Jorgensen	Decision (unanimous)	UFC Fight Night: Henderson vs. Khabilov	June 7, 2014	3	5:00	Albuquerque, New Mexico, United States	Fight of the Night.
Loss	18–5	Chris Cariaso	Decision (unanimous)	UFC 169	February 1, 2014	3	5:00	Newark, New Jersey, United States	
Win	18–4	Ian Dela Cuesta	Decision (unanimous)	Coalition of Combat: Free 4 All	December 1, 2012	3	5:00	Phoenix, Arizona, United States	
Win	17–4	Richie Bonafidini	TKO (punches)	Xplode Fight Series: Disarm	March 24, 2012	1	2:33	Valley Center, California, United States	
Win	16–4	Nick Boyd	TKO (punches)	Xplode Fight Series: Brutal Conduct	January 21, 2012	1	1:49	Valley Center, California, United States	
Win	15–4	Eduardo Espinosa	Decision (unanimous)	Ultimate Warrior Challenge Mexico 9: They're Back	March 26, 2011	3	5:00	Tijuana, Mexico	
Loss	14–4	Jussier Formiga	Decision (unanimous)	Tachi Palace Fights 7	December 2, 2010	3	5:00	Lemoore, California, United States	Flyweight debut.
Win	14–3	Nick Honstein	TKO (punches)	King of Champions: Night of Champions	June 27, 2009	2	2:06	Denver, Colorado, United States	
Loss	13–3	Joseph Benavidez	Decision (unanimous)	WEC 37	December 3, 2008	3	5:00	Las Vegas, Nevada, United States	
Win	13–2	Joey Marimberga	Submission (rear-naked choke)	Evolution MMA	October 4, 2008	3	3:19	Phoenix, Arizona, United States	
Win	12–2	Justin Cruz	TKO (doctor stoppage)	Total Combat 31	September 20, 2008	2	4:27	Yuma, Arizona, United States	
Win	11–2	Felipe Chavez	Submission (guillotine choke)	Rage in the Cage 113	August 2, 2008	1	2:07	Albuquerque, New Mexico, United States	
Loss	10–2	Adrian Woolley	Decision (unanimous)	TKO 34	June 7, 2008	5	5:00	Montreal, Quebec, Canada	For the TKO Bantamweight Championship.
Win	10-1	Johan Croes	TKO (punches)	TKO 33	April 18, 2008	3	3:00	Oranjestad, Aruba	
Win	9–1	Justin Goodall	KO (punches and elbows)	Xtreme FC 3: Rage in the Cage	March 2, 2008	2	1:43	Tampa, Florida, United States	Bantamweight debut.
Loss	8–1	Mark Hominick	Decision (unanimous)	TKO 31	December 14, 2007	3	5:00	Montreal, Quebec, Canada	
Win	8–0	Derithe Harper	Decision (split)	Rage in the Cage 102	October 13, 2007	3	3:00	Tucson, Arizona, United States	
Win	7–0	Billy Kidd	Submission (rear-naked choke)	EC Fights	September 29, 2007	3	N/A	Monterrey, Mexico	Featherweight debut.
Win	6–0	Kavi Cermak	Decision (unanimous)	Rage in the Cage 91	February 24, 2007	3	3:00	Phoenix, Arizona, United States	
Win	5–0	Yasha Tabrizy	TKO (punches)	Rage in the Cage 89	December 2, 2006	2	1:26	Fountain Hills, Arizona, United States	
Win	4–0	Daniel Hinsen	Submission (guillotine choke)	Rage in the Cage 88	November 11, 2006	1	0:44	Tucson, Arizona, United States	
Win	3–0	Cameron Mayer	TKO (injury)	Rage in the Cage 85	August 5, 2006	2	3:00	Phoenix, Arizona, United States	
Win	2–0	Greg Saenz	Decision (split)	Rage in the Cage 84	July 1, 2006	3	3:00	Phoenix, Arizona, United States	
Win	1–0	Tim Goodwin	TKO (punches)	Universal Fight Promotions: Supremacy	June 3, 2006	1	2:31	Carlsbad, New Mexico, United States	

== See also ==
- List of current UFC fighters
- List of male mixed martial artists
