= Maroubra Surfers Church =

Coordinates: 33°55′35.7″S 151°13′55.00″E

Maroubra Surfers Church (MSC) is a church in Sydney, Australia that was founded specifically to minister to people in the Sydney surfing community.

== History ==
MSC officially started as a church in 2007. However, Christian outreach to the Maroubra surfing community has been going since the 1980s.

Maroubra Surfers Church was run in the open air at Maroubra Beach but in 2010 it joined up with Holy Trinity Anglican Church in Kingsford to stabilise financially, as it was rapidly running out of funds. Maroubra Surfers Church still runs many of its events in the open air. Some of the members of Maroubra Surfers Church now attend Holy Trinity Kingsford.

The church attempts to offer outreach and ministry to the Sydney surfing community on the community's own terms, rather than expecting members to turn up on the doorstep of a church The beliefs of the church are those stated in the Statement of Beliefs of the Australian Fellowship of Evangelical Students.

== Leadership ==
Steve Bligh is the minister of Maroubra Surfer's Church. Steve has been married to Fiona since 1981. He has two married sons who surf, and a daughter.
