= Ross Clarke-Jones =

Australian surfer (born 1966)

Ross Clarke-Jones (6 June 1966) is an Australian big wave surfer. He originally came from Terrigal in the Central Coast, of New South Wales, Australia where he enjoyed surfing Terrigal Haven, a point break that produces rare waves lasting for up to 300 metres on a big swell. Residing in Phillip Island Australia with wife Ella who he started core brand Born Maniac with their groodle George.

Known also as "Dark Bones" and "RCJ", Clarke-Jones is known for his love of huge waves, and along with tow partner Tony Ray have taken on some of the biggest waves ever attempted. On 28 January 1998, the two were part of a small group of surfers who rode giant Outside Log Cabins on the north shore of Oahu in Hawaii. Wave faces were anything between 50 and 80 feet. Other surfers included Noah Johnson, Aaron Lambert, Cheyne Horan, Dan Moore, Milton Bradley Willis and Michael Willis who were the first to go out. Clarke-Jones and Ray had a memorable moment when both ski and surfer were caught and pummeled by a 60' wave, knocking them both into the water.

Clarke-Jones is perennial invitee to the Quiksilver Eddie Aikau Big Wave contest held at Waimea Bay and in minimum 20'-25' surf. In 2000/2001, he won the Eddie, becoming the first non-Hawaiian to do so. He continues to pursue big wave thrills in Hawaii, Australia, California, Tasmania, South Africa, and Europe.

He is known for surfing Shipsterns Bluff, Cow Bombie, and Pedra Branca.

In 2019, Clarke-Jones competed in the sixth season of Australian Survivor. He was medically evacuated on Day 28 after fracturing an ankle during a challenge, finishing in 13th place.

== Storm Surfers 3D ==
On 14 August 2012, on a six-million dollar budget, the documentary titled Storm Surfers 3D was released, with Clarke-Jones being the main focus alongside fellow surfer Tom Carroll. The movie focused on spectacular tow-in rides in the Great Southern Ocean at Cow Bombie, Ship Stern, The South Coast Bombie, and Turtle Dove. Premieres were at Toronto on 9, 11, 15 and 16 September 2012; San Sebastian on 20–28 September 2012; Santa Barbara on 27 January – 3 February 2013; San Luis Obispo on 7 March 2013; and Honolulu on 10–27 April 2013.
