= Corey Adams =

Australian rugby league footballer

Personal information
- Full name: Corey Adams
- Born: 12 February 1962 (age 64) Maroubra, New South Wales, Australia

Playing information
Club
Years	Team	Pld	T	G	FG	P
1984	South Sydney	2	0	0	0	0
1985	Eastern Suburbs	4	0	0	0	0
	Total	6	0	0	0	0

Corey Adams (born 1962) is an Australian former professional rugby league footballer in the New South Wales Rugby League competition. He played for the South Sydney Rabbitohs and Eastern Suburbs.

Between 1974 and 2019, Adams held the Sydney eastern suburbs school zone boys 12 200m freestyle record (2 minutes and 30.90 seconds).

After a brief playing career, Adams spent 20 years as a professional lifeguard at Bondi Beach with Waverley Council, featuring in many episodes of Bondi Rescue over its first three seasons. During his time as a lifeguard, he also served a firefighter with Fire and Rescue NSW. In 2011, he became president of the Maroubra Surfers Association. He still held that position in 2013.
