= Bombora =

Indigenous Australian term for large sea waves

Bombora is an Indigenous Australian term from the Eora language for sea waves breaking over a shallow area such as a submerged rock shelf, reef, or sand bank that is located away from the shoreline and beach surf break. In slang, it is also called a bommie.

As the wave passes over the shallow area its shape is raised and steepened, creating a localised wave formation. The size and shape of bombora waves makes them attractive to surfers willing to take the risk of riding what is generally considered a hazardous pursuit.

These formations can pose a significant danger even in good weather as a bombora may not be identifiable because it may not always have breaking waves.

The term bombora was given wide circulation in 2009 on ABC TV with the airing of a documentary that received a nomination for the 2010 Logie Awards in Australia. The documentary explored historical dimensions of the relationship between surf culture and Australian cultural identity.

"Bombora" is also the title of a popular music instrumental released in 1963 by Australian surf rock band The Atlantics.

The term bombora is also used for a sketchy surf spot where waves seem to break on the outside.

== Well known instances ==
- Cowaramup Bombora (or simply Cow Bombie) – near Margaret River, Western Australia, location of the 2011 and 2015 Oakley Biggest Wave award-winning rides.
- Dobroyd Bombora – in Sydney Harbour, New South Wales.
- Fingal Island - off the lighthouse, at Port Stephens.
- Jibbon Bombora – at Bundeena in the south of Sydney.
- Outer Bombora – at Yallingup, Western Australia.
- "The Bommie" – on the northern side of The Penguin's Head, Culburra Beach, New South Wales.
- Killcare and Maitland Bay bomboras in Bouddi National Park, New South Wales.
- Queenscliff Bombora – in Sydney, New South Wales.
- Bombora_(company) – the American technology company.

== See also ==
- Surf culture
