= Maroubra Bay High School =

- Maroubra, New South Wales; Australia

Information
- Type: Public, secondary, co-educational, day school
- Motto: Latin: Nil Sine Labore (Nothing Without Labour)
- Established: January 1955
- Status: Closed
- Closed: December 1990
- Principal: M. J. Carew B.A. Dip.Ed. (1955–1956, 1963–); Arthur James (1956–1963)
- Grades: 7–12
- Campus: Malabar Road

Maroubra Bay High School is a closed high school in the south-eastern Sydney suburb of Maroubra. The school opened in 1955 as a junior boys school, and closed in 1990. The closed site was briefly used as a location site for the television series Heartbreak High (actress Emma Roche, who played Danielle, was also a student at that very same school as well). The former school site, adjacent to Maroubra Bay Public School, has now been redeveloped into town houses.

The school was originally opened as South Sydney Boys Junior High School but was upgraded to be South Sydney Boys High School in 1957. A further decision to make the school co-educational and transfer the school name to the Junior Technical High School also in Maroubra led to the name change to Maroubra Bay High School from January 1959.

The future professional golfer Vic Bennetts attended the school in the 1950s.

== See also ==
- List of Government schools in New South Wales
