= Maroubra High School =

Location
- Maroubra, New South Wales; Australia; 33°56′8″S 151°14′20″E

Information
- Former name: Maroubra Junction Girls Junior High; Maroubra Junction Girls High; Maroubra Junction High
- Type: Public, secondary, co-educational, day school
- Motto: Latin: Excelsior (Ever higher)
- Established: January 1962
- Status: Closed
- Closed: December 2002
- Principal: Lawrie Butterfield
- Grades: 7–12
- Campus: 758 Anzac Parade
- Colours: Royal blue and gold

Maroubra High School was a public high school located in Maroubra, Sydney, New South Wales, Australia. Established in 1962 as a girls high school, it became co-educational in 1981 before being closed in 2002. It primarily served the areas of the Eastern Suburbs. The school site has been the campus of the Lycée Condorcet since 2003.

== History ==
Maroubra Junction Girls Junior High School opened in January 1962. The school was the sister school to the nearby South Sydney Boys High School (est. 1953), and became Maroubra Junction Girls High School in October 1969. From January 1981, the school, alongside South Sydney Boys, became co-educational and was known as Maroubra Junction High School. The school was renamed "Maroubra High School" from January 1990. In 2002, the school was declared surplus to the requirements of the Department of Education and Training and closed by December 2002.

In 2003 the vacant school buildings and land were purchased by the Lycée Condorcet with assistance from the local member for Maroubra, NSW Premier Bob Carr, and the Agency for French Education Abroad. It has been the school's campus since then.
