= South Sydney High School =

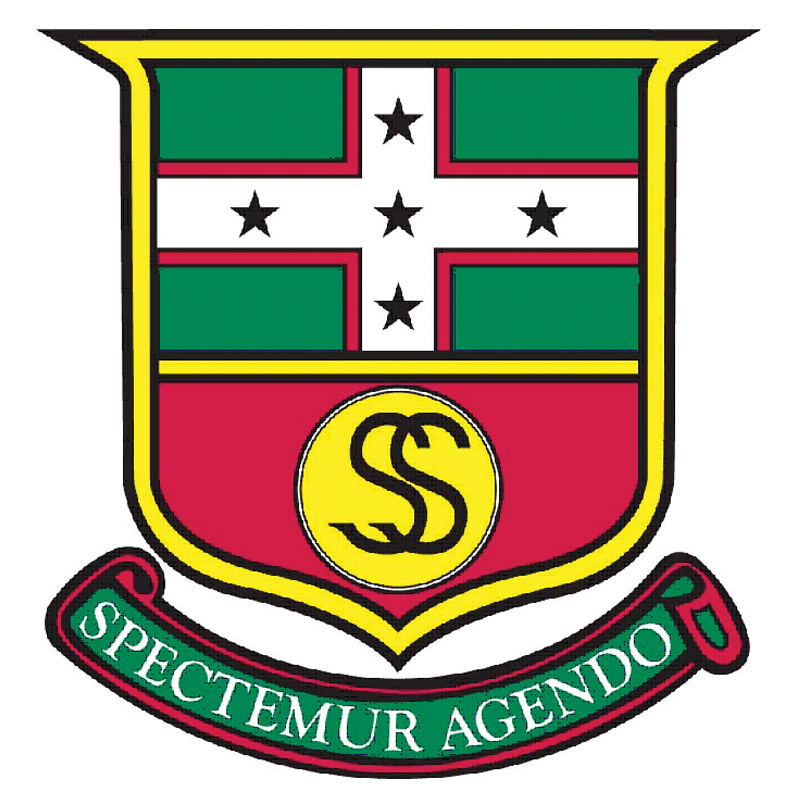

Location
- O'Sullivan Avenue; Maroubra, New South Wales, 2035; Australia; 33°56′40.42″S 151°14′7.00″E

Information
- Type: Public, co-educational, secondary school
- Motto: Latin: Spectemur agendo (Let us be known by our deeds)
- Established: January 1953
- Principal: Janice Neilsen
- Enrolment: 804 (7–12)
- Campus: Paine Street
- Houses: Banks; Dutton; Lawson; Northcott
- Colours: Green and Lemon (Juniors, Yrs 7–10); White (Seniors, Yrs 11–12)
- Yearbook: The Southerner
- Website: South Sydney High School

South Sydney High School is a public school in Maroubra, Sydney, Australia. Established in 1953 as a boys high school, it is today a co-educational high school operated by the New South Wales Department of Education for students from Year 7 to Year 12. It primarily serves those coming from South Eastern Sydney and the Eastern Suburbs regions.

== History ==
Following the Second World War it was determined that the Maroubra Junction Technical School would be crowded out of its premises on Anzac Parade. A site for a new school, bounded by Paine Street in the north, and Walsh and O'Sullivan Avenue in the south, had been selected in 1945. This area was originally taken over by the Commonwealth Government for defence purposes. It was cleared as early as 1948 and preparations made for what was to be known as South Sydney Technical School. The building foundations were laid on 27 May 1950 by then Minister for Education, Bob Heffron.

Due to long delays the first portion of the school was not ready until July 1952, with the school not being occupied until February 1953. On 5 April 1954, South Sydney Junior Technical High School was officially opened by the Governor of New South Wales, Lieutenant-General Sir John Northcott.

At the beginning of 1959 it was decided that South Sydney Junior Technical High School would be renamed South Sydney Boys' High School, with the name taken from the reconstituted Maroubra Bay High School nearby. The end of 1961 saw the retirement of the school's first principal, William Dutton. In his place Thomas Tasker, who was headmaster of Northmead High School, was appointed. In 1962 the annual school magazine, "Southerner", was published for the first time. That same year, in honour of the contribution made to the school by Heffron, the library was named the "R. J. Heffron Library".

In August 1980 the Minister for Education Paul Landa announced that South Sydney Boys' High School and Maroubra Junction Girls High would be partly co-educational in 1981 and fully co-educational in 1983 to become South Sydney High School and Maroubra High School respectively. The site was briefly used as a location site for the 2022 Netflix reboot of the television series Heartbreak High.

== Principals ==
Term	SSJTHS
1953–1959	William Dutton
Term	SSBHS
1959–1961	William Dutton
1962–1969	Thomas Tasker MSc Dip.Ed.
1969–1973	Ray Cocking B.A. L.T.C.L.
1973–1975	Eric Barnett
1976–1977	John Frederick
1978	A. Moore
1979–1983	Don Brown
Term	SSHS
1983–1986	Don Brown
1987–1996	T. Edwards
1997–2005	Lindy Taylor
2006–2013	Ross Fitzpatrick
2013–2018	Robyn Matthews
2019–date	Janice Neilson

== Houses ==
A House system was established by the early 1960s, dividing all students into four houses named after one representative from four main educational disciplines:

- Banks – Science – named after botanist, Sir Joseph Banks.
- Dutton – Education – named after the first headmaster, William Dutton.
- Lawson – Literature – named after poet, Henry Lawson.
- Northcott – Defence – named after the NSW Governor who opened the school, Sir John Northcott.

== Notable alumni ==
- Professor John Boyages AM – 1975 DUX, Professor of Breast Oncology and Director of ALERT (Australian Lymphoedema Education Research and Treatment), Macquarie University.
- Tolu Latu – rugby union player and current Waratah
- Adam Liberman – 1969 School Captain, General Counsel for the CSIRO and Visiting Professorial Fellow of the UNSW Faculty of Law.
- Col Loughnan – former member of The Delltones, and Ayers Rock, and lecturer in saxophone at the Sydney Conservatorium of Music since 1978.
- Alex Perry – fashion designer
- Tiana Penitani – rugby union player
- John Sutton – rugby league player for South Sydney Rabbitohs.
- Mike Whitney – former Australian Test Cricketer and television personality.
- Scott Wilson – rugby league player
- Macario De Souza – Australian filmmaker
