= Cowaramup Bombora =

Surf break near Margaret River, Western Australia

- Cowie Bombie, Cow Bombie
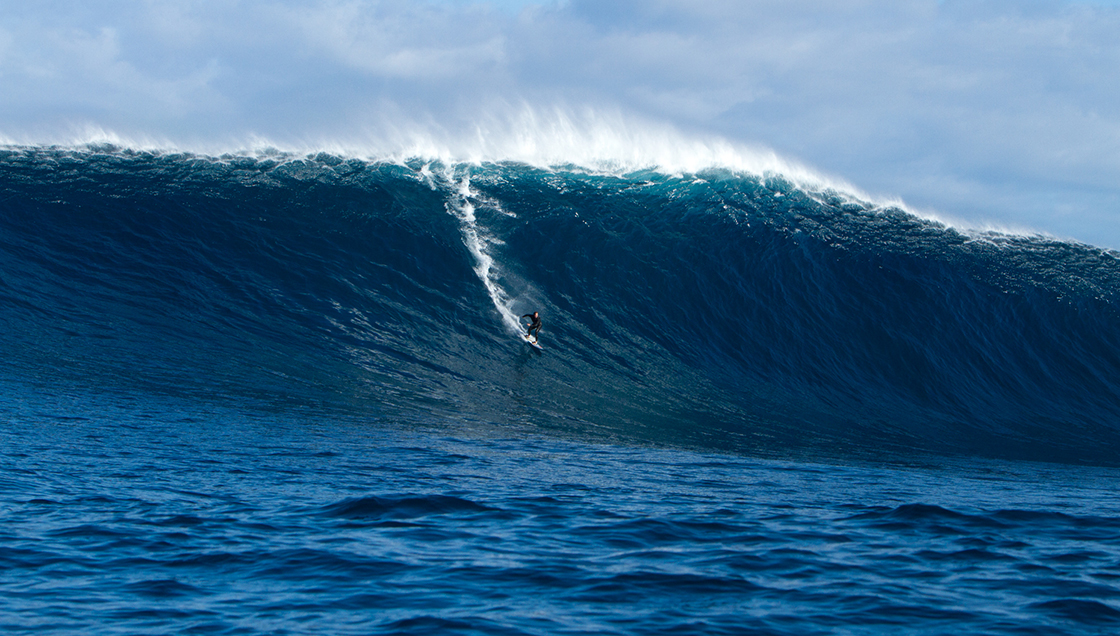
- Mick Corbett surfing Cow Bombie in 2014
- Location: Offshore of Gracetown, Western Australia
- Coordinates: 33°51′21″S 114°58′05″E (Approximate)
- Part of: Indian Ocean

Location
- Interactive map of Cowaramup Bombora

Cowaramup Bombora (also known as Cowie Bombie or simply Cow Bombie) is a big wave open-ocean surf break found on the south-west coast of Western Australia. It is located 2 kilometres (1.2 mi) offshore west of Gracetown which is near the town of Margaret River, world-renowned for its surf, and is 265 kilometres (165 mi) south of the capital city Perth.

The break first came to the world’s attention in 2007, when local Damon Eastaugh won the Big Wave Award after riding a wave estimated to be more than 15 metres (50 ft).

It doesn't break often, requiring huge swells from the Southern Ocean, but these can produce very large waves, often in excess of 12 metres (40 ft), with some contending for the biggest wave in Australia at over 18 metres (60 ft).

Its name comes from Cowaramup, the name of the small local townsite, and bombora, an Indigenous Australian term for an area of large sea waves breaking over a shallow area.

The break was featured in the 2013 documentary series Storm Surfers 3D which described it as, "on its day, the tallest wave in Australia", where Tom Carroll survived a near-death wipeout while surfing with Ross Clarke-Jones. It also featured in the 2011 documentary film Fighting Fear.

In 2011, Western Australian surfer Damien Warr won the Oakley Biggest Wave award for his ride on Cow Bombie. In February 2015, Jarryd Foster, won the Oakley Biggest Wave award for his ride on Cow Bombie. Mick Corbett was also a 2015 finalist for the same award with his Cow Bombie ride.

On 26 June 2015, Australian surfer Felicity Palmateer became the first woman to surf Cow Bombie.

On 2 March 2016, the Oakley Big Wave Awards 2015–2016 were announced, with two of the three major awards coming from Cow Bombie: Zac Haynes won Biggest Paddle-In, and Justin Holland won Biggest Wave in Australian Waters, finishing second and third respectively for Ride Of The Year. All three contenders for Biggest Wave were at Cow Bombie.
