= Dakota Abberton =

Australian surfer

- Occupation: Surfer
- Known for: Bra Boys: Blood is Thicker than Water
- Relatives: Sunny Abberton (brother); Jai Abberton (brother); Koby Abberton (brother)

Dakota Abberton (born in Maroubra, New South Wales), an Australian surfer, is a member of the Australian surf gang the Bra Boys. Together with his brothers, Koby, Jai, and Sunny, Dakota Abberton achieved national and international attention in 2007 with the release of a feature-length documentary entitled Bra Boys: Blood is Thicker than Water, that was written and directed by the Bra Boys.

== Background and documentary ==
Abberton is the youngest of four brothers, after Sunny, Jai and Koby. The brothers grew up in Maroubra and were raised largely by their grandmother.

Abberton and his brothers featured in Bra Boys: Blood is Thicker than Water, which explored the group's history and their family background. Written by Sunny Abberton and co-directed with Macario De Souza, the documentary was narrated by Russell Crowe and released in Australian cinemas on 15 March 2007.

The brothers were also the subjects of Sean Doherty's 2009 book My Brother's Keeper: The Official Bra Boys Story.

== Robbery and assault charges ==
In March 2011, Abberton was arrested and charged with aggravated robbery, affray, destruction of property, two counts of assault occasioning actual bodily harm, and drug charges following the assault and robbery of a woman. In April 2011, he was granted strict conditional bail after his lawyer argued that the injuries sustained by the victim were caused by other people. In December 2012, Abberton pleaded guilty to two charges of assault occasioning actual bodily harm, reckless wounding in company and damaging property. In February 2013, Abberton was sentenced to 21 months imprisonment but avoided jail time because the NSW District Court ordered that he serve it by way of an intensive correction order (ICO), due to him having a "mild intellectual disability".
