= Lycée Condorcet (Sydney) =

Location
- 758 Anzac Parade; Maroubra, New South Wales; Australia; 33°56′8″S 151°14′20″E

Information
- Type: French-based independent co-educational early learning, primary, and secondary day school
- Motto: The International French School of Sydney
- Established: 1969
- Principal: Nicolas L'hotellier
- Grades: Early learning and K–12
- Enrolment: ~1,070 (August 2019)
- Campus: Suburban
- Website: www.condorcet.com.au

Lycée Condorcet Sydney (also known as the International French School of Sydney and formerly as the French School of Sydney) is a French-based independent co-educational early learning, primary, and secondary day school, located in Maroubra, an eastern suburb of Sydney, New South Wales, Australia.

The school provides an education for children from Maternelle – Year 12 and is linked to the French Ministry of Foreign Affairs, is approved by the AEFE (Agency for French Teaching Abroad) and regulated by French authorities. The IB Diploma Programme is approved by the International Baccalaureate Organization.

The school is a member of the Association of Independent Schools. The petite and moyenne section of maternelle are approved by the NSW Department of Education.

== History ==
The school was established in 1969, and was renamed to 'Lycée Condorcet' in 1988 on the eve of the bicentenary of the French Revolution of 1789. This name was based on Marie Jean Antoine Caritat, the marquis of Condorcet, the famous father of French Education.

In 2003, the school moved to its current location in Maroubra, on the site of the former Maroubra High School.

== Education ==
The curriculum taught at the Lycée Condorcet follows the French education system, with the exception of the English classes which follow the NSW curriculum. Staff at the school are mostly French trained teachers.

The International French school accepts enrolments from all students with a working knowledge of French in primary school and secondary school and students who only speak English are welcome to join the school from year 10 onwards as part of the International Baccalaureate program. Students from grade 10 to 12 are classed in the upper secondary school, considered the 'international section' by the school. Students in these years are prepared for their upcoming International Baccalaureate exams or they prepare the French Baccalaureate. Those students taking the International Baccalaureate (IB) are taught by teachers entirely in English for the rest of these years whereas those taking the French Baccalaureate study entirely in French.

Despite being in New South Wales, the school does not formally conform to the Department of Education's curriculum but is registered by the NSW government as a specialist school from preschool level to year 12. Unlike non-government or government schools in the state, the students are not required to wear uniform whilst attending classes, as is the custom in France. The school year follows roughly the European calendar. It begins in August and ends in June, unlike the Australian education system which starts the year in January and ends it in December.

== Students ==
The student population at the school is made up of over 20 nationalities, and the school has initiated an effort to make sure non-Francophone students learn French via foreign language classes.

== See also ==
- List of non-government schools in New South Wales
- French Australian
- Education in Australia
- Education in France
