= South Side Story (2007 TV series) =

- Genre: Sport/documentary
- Written by: David Alrich
- Starring: Russell Crowe, Peter Holmes à Court, David Peachey, David Kidwell, Jason Taylor, Roy Asotasi, Nathan Merritt, Nigel Vagana, David Fa'alogo, John Sutton, Issac Luke
- Narrated by: Jack Thompson
- Country of origin: Australia
- Original language: English
- No. of seasons: 1
- No. of episodes: 6

Production
- Executive producer: David Alrich
- Producer: Jonathon Summerhayes Macario De Souza
- Camera setup: Macario De Souza
- Running time: 30 minutes
- Production company: Beyond Entertainment Pty Limited

Original release
- Network: ABC
- Release: 7 August 2007

South Side Story is a six-part observational documentary series about the takeover of National Rugby League team, the South Sydney Rabbitohs by actor Russell Crowe and businessman Peter Holmes à Court in 2006.

== Cast ==
- Jack Thompson as Narrator
- Russell Crowe
- Peter Holmes à Court
- George Piggins
- John Sattler
- Jason Taylor
- Alan Jones
- Shane Richardson
- Mario Fenech
- Reni Maitua
- John Sutton
- David Peachey
- David Kidwell
- Jaiman Lowe
- Dean Widders
- Roy Asotasi
- Nathan Merritt
- Nigel Vagana
- Issac Luke
- Joe Williams

== Episodes ==
=== Series overview ===
| Season | Episodes | Originally released | |
| Season | Episodes | First released | Last released |
|---|---|---|---|
| 1 | 6 | 9 May 2013 | 27 June 2013 |

== See also ==
2007 South Sydney Rabbitohs season
