= Shipstern Bluff =

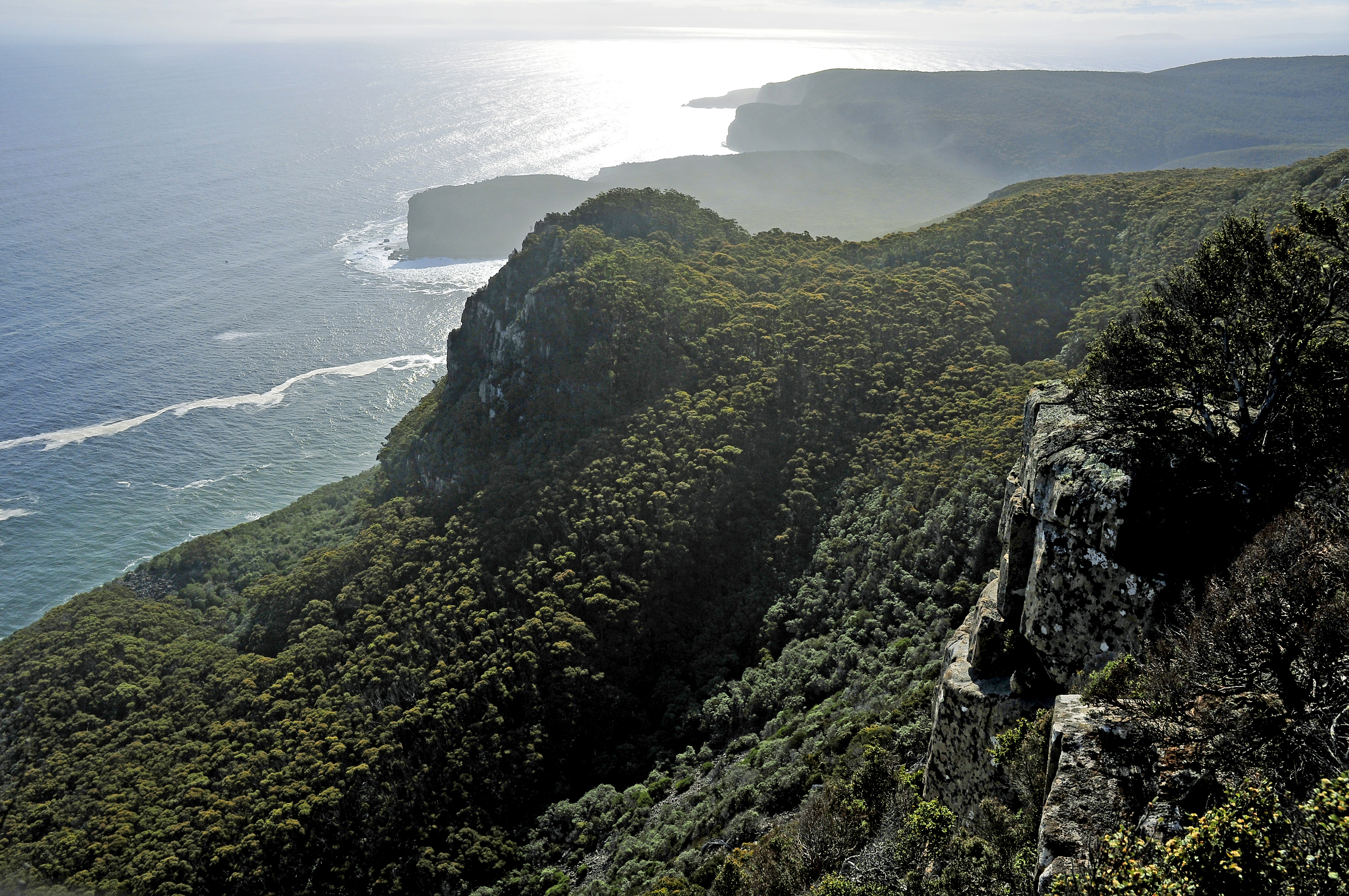
- Shipstern Bluff from Cape Raoul lookout

- Coordinates: 43°12′33″S 147°45′7″E
- Country: Australia
- State: Tasmania
- LGA: Tasman Council
- Established: 1997 to the surfing community
- Mean max temp: 18 °C (64 °F)
- Mean min temp: 5 °C (41 °F)

Shipstern Bluff (also known as Devil's Point or simply Shippies) is a globally renowned big-wave surfing location on the southeastern coast of Tasmania, Australia, on the Tasman Peninsula.

== Location ==
Shipstern Bluff is located on the southern point of the Tasman Peninsula Tasmania, near Cape Raoul. It is approximately a 30 km boat/jet ski ride from the coast to the Bluff and is regarded amongst the surfing community as one of the wildest and most dangerous locations in the world, both for the surf and the prevalence of great white sharks. The wave is also well known for its multifaceted inner formations, referred to by many of its surfers as steps, which give the wave a unique appearance and greatly adds to the challenge of surfing it.

== Surfers ==
Some of the more notable surfers who have tackled Shipstern Bluff include:

- Andrew Campbell
- James Polanowski
- Marti Paradidis
- Laurie Towner
- Charles Condon
- Kipp Caddy
- Kelly Slater
- Kieren Perrow
- Ross Clarke-Jones
- Andy Irons
- Richie Vaculik
- Mick Fanning
- Dave Rastovich

== Favorable conditions ==
- Swell direction: WSW
- Wind direction: NNE at 50n
- Tide: Medium to high

It is known to hold and break from 1 metre plus in winter.

== Gallery ==
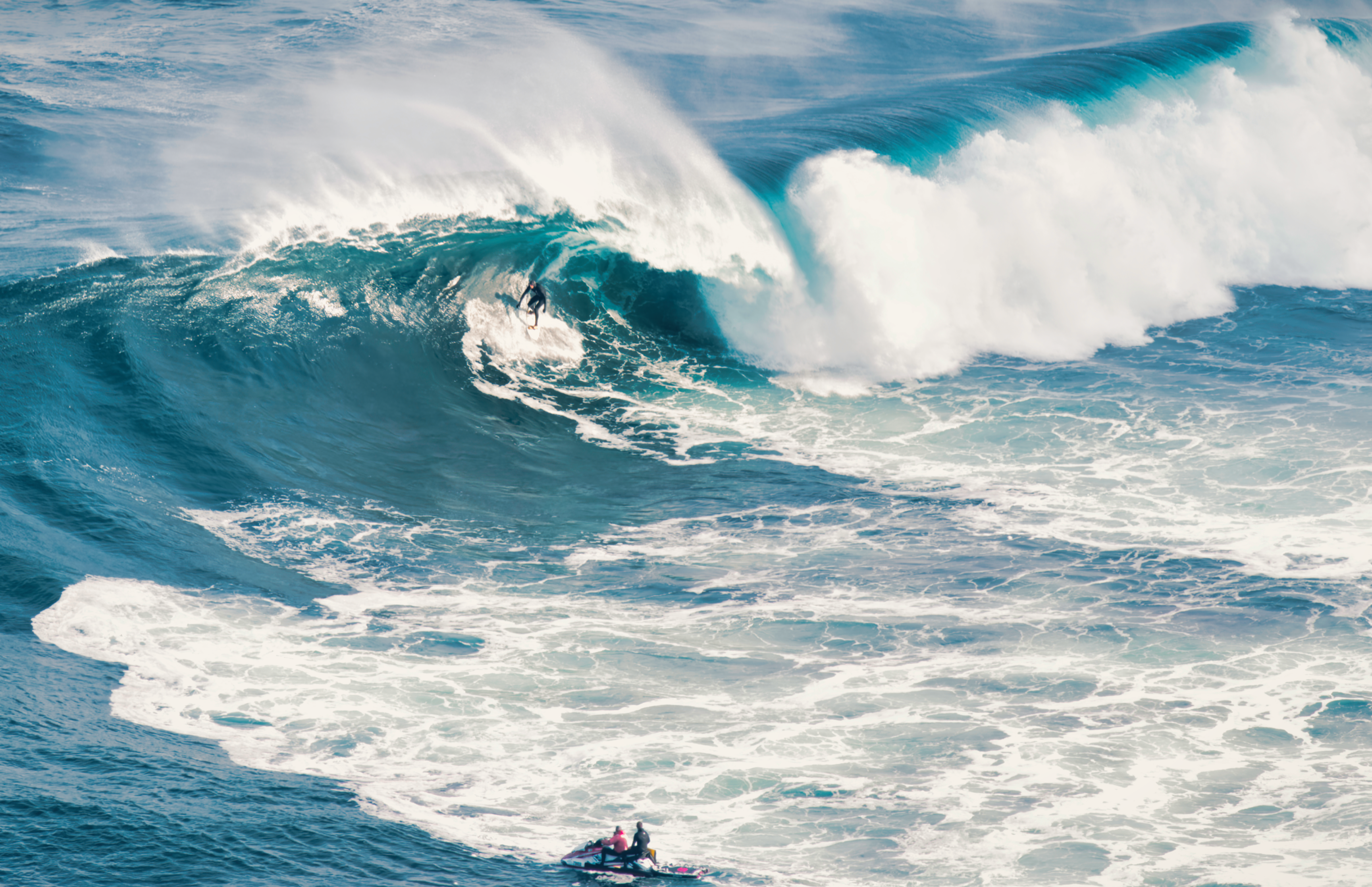
Surfer at Shipstern Bluff, June 2023
