= Fighting Fear =

- Directed by: Macario De Souza
- Starring: Richie Vaculik; Mark Matthews; Kelly Slater; B.J. Penn; Bruce Irons; Joel Edgerton
- Production company: Screen Australia
- Distributed by: Madman Entertainment
- Release date: 2011
- Running time: 112 minutes
- Country: Australia
- Language: English

Fighting Fear is a 2011 Australian documentary film about professional surfing. In 2013, the film was honored by the Australian Film Institute with two Australian Academy of Cinema and Television Arts Awards, specifically for Best Cinematography in a Documentary and Best Direction in a Documentary. The film stars Richie Vaculik and Mark Matthews. It was filmed in and around Sydney, Australia, primarily in the South-Eastern Sydney suburbs.
