= Bra Boys =

Australian organised crime group

The Bra Boys are a gang centred on surf culture, founded and based in Maroubra, an eastern suburb of Sydney, in the 1990s. The gang has gained notoriety through violence and alleged links to organised crime, as well as some community activism. The Bra Boys achieved national and international media attention in 2007 with the release of a feature-length documentary entitled Bra Boys: Blood Is Thicker than Water, written and directed by members of the group, and narrated by Academy Award-winning actor Russell Crowe.

== Origins ==
The Bra Boys are held together by surfing as well as community ties to the Maroubra area. The group is often linked with the North Maroubra Surf Riders (NMSR), with which a number of its members are associated. In an interview on Triple J radio, Koby Abberton pointed out that "Bra" is a reference to the gang's suburb, Maroubra, and partly after the street slang for brother. Some members of the gang tattoo "My Brother's Keeper" across the front of their chest, "Bra Boys" and Maroubra's postcode "2035" on their backs.

With a reputation of being territorial, the group is known to have taken control of a Sydney reef break, known as 'Cape Solander', located in Kurnell, and renaming the break 'Ours'. In July 2007, The Sydney Morning Herald reported an altercation that took place between professional bodyboarder Mitch Rawlins and a group of several Bra Boys members, including Koby Abberton. Rawlins was allegedly approached by a Bra Boy member and told to "fuck off". It is believed an argument broke out and then turned physical with Rawlins being punched in the head. A spokesman for the Bra Boys confirmed there had been "some sort of small incident" but denied any major violence.

== Notoriety and violence ==
Prominent Bra Boys members include rugby league players Reni Maitua, John Sutton, as well as the Abberton brothers, Sunny, Jai, Dakota, and Koby, with the last being the most notorious of the brothers.

=== Criminal matters ===
In late 2002, around 160 members of the gang attending a birthday party at the Coogee-Randwick RSL Club were involved in a brawl with off-duty Waverley police officers leaving a Christmas party on the same premises. News reports numbered the combatants in the incident at around 120, with 30 police officers left injured after the event.

In 2005, Jai Abberton was acquitted of the 2003 murder of stand-over man Anthony 'Tony' Hines. However, his brother Koby was handed a suspended nine-month jail sentence after being found guilty of perverting the course of justice with regards to the same matter.

In November 2008, Koby Abberton was jailed for three days by a US court after being found guilty of assaulting an off-duty police officer in a fight outside a nightclub in Honolulu, Hawaii.

In November 2009 Jai Abberton was jailed for eight months for breaching a good behaviour bond.

In 2009 a syndicate with alleged links to members of the Bra Boys were caught smuggling cocaine following interceptions of conversations dating back to 1997. It was alleged that syndicate members were granted security passes to restricted areas within Sydney Airport, bypassing Australian Customs, that enabled them to smuggle prohibited narcotics from Los Angeles concealed in on-board catering refuse.

=== 2005 Cronulla race riots ===
In the lead up to the 2005 Cronulla riots, Koby Abberton spoke to The Daily Telegraph about the assault of a volunteer lifesaver that sparked the incident, claiming:

"The reason why it's not happening at Maroubra is because of the Bra Boys. Girls go to Cronulla, Bondi, everywhere else in Sydney and get harassed, but they come to Maroubra and nothing happens to them. I read all this stuff about kids getting harassed because they want to have a surf and I say 'are you kidding?' The beach should be for Aussie kids. But if you want to go to beaches and act tough in groups you better be able to back it up. If these fellas come out to Maroubra and start something they know it's going to be on, so they stay away."

Members of the Bra Boys joined in the racial violence when the riots spread to Maroubra soon afterwards. Afterwards the Abberton brothers then held a joint media conference with members the Comanchero Motorcycle Club (a bikie gang, who include many Lebanese as their members) to help ease tensions, declaring peace. "I think that this is the start, the boys have agreed to come down and talk to us, to start some dialogue between the groups, you know, to try and ease some tension", said Sunny Abberton in a group interview on The 7.30 Report.

=== General community activism ===
In August 2005, the Bra Boys led a 100-person non-violent protest against plans by Randwick Council to introduce parking meters near the local beaches.

== MBK Clothing ==
Inspired by the bullying codes instilled by the Bra Boys, the Abberton brothers created a clothing line entitled MyBrothersKeeper Clothing.

== Documentary ==
A 90-minute documentary film about the surf gang entitled Bra Boys premiered in Sydney on 7 March 2007 and was released on 15 March 2007. The film details a story of the Bra Boys from the viewpoint of the gang, particularly the Abbertons. Sunny Abberton wrote and co-directed the film with Macario De Souza. Actor Russell Crowe provided narration. The film's official cast included 49 well-known surfers from Bra Boys members Evan Faulks and Richie 'Vas' Vaculik to eleven-time world champion Kelly Slater and surfing legends including Mark Occhilupo, Bruce Irons, and Laird Hamilton.

== In popular culture ==
The Bra Boys were made the subject of satire by The Chaser's War on Everything, episode 29, aired on 11 April 2007. In the skit Julian Morrow approached gang members while wearing a pill-filled brassiere and sporting a tattoo similar to Koby Abberton's saying "mybrothersalibi". A gang member responded by slipping off his thong and flinging it at Morrow.

Long-running Australian television soap opera Home and Away has produced a thinly veiled reference to the Bra Boys in the fictional storyline of "the River Boys" that was broadcast in Australia commencing 16 February 2011.

The 2011 Chris Lilley mockumentary Angry Boys featured fictional surf gangs the Mucca Mad Boys and the Fennel Hell Men, which have been described as similar to the Bra Boys.
