= Henry Lawrie Bell =

Lieutenant-Colonel Henry Lawrie Bell (1929–1984) was a career officer in the Australian Army and a notable amateur ornithologist. He grew up and went to school in Maroubra, New South Wales.

Bell was interested in ornithology from an early age and became familiar with the birds of the Sydney region. In 1974 he attended the International Ornithological Congress in Canberra. When he was posted to New Guinea from 1975 to 1978 he took the opportunity to make substantial ecological studies of birds there, resulting in the publication of numerous papers in the journal of the Royal Australasian Ornithologists Union, the Emu, and elsewhere. On returning to Australia in 1978 he undertook a four-year study of thornbills for his PhD.
