= Sunny Abberton =

Australian surfer

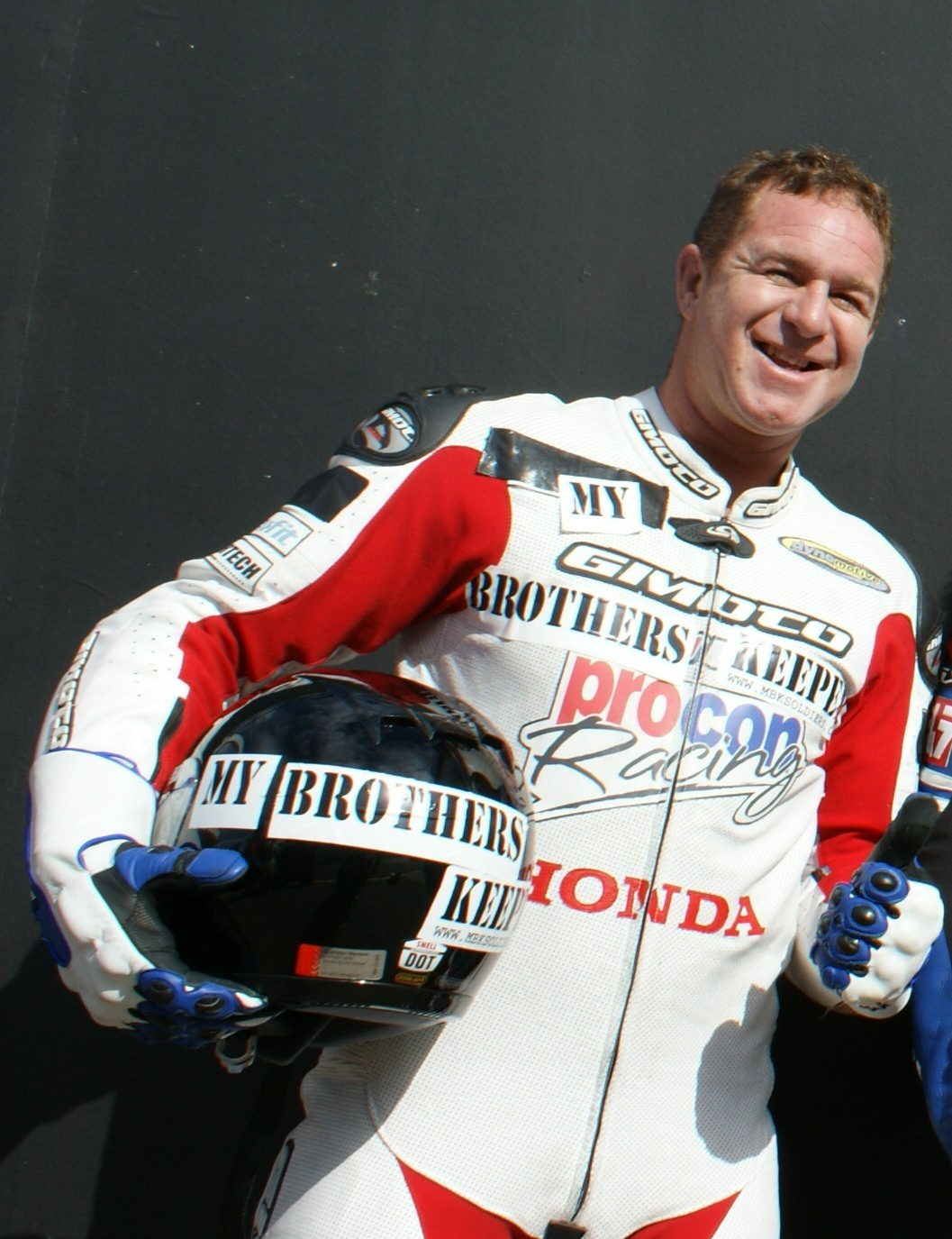
Image of Sunny Abberton

Sunny Abberton (born c. 1974 in Maroubra, Sydney), is a founding member of the Australian surf tribe the Bra Boys. Together with his brothers, Koby, Jai, and Dakota, Sunny Abberton achieved national and international attention in 2007 with the release of a feature-length documentary entitled Bra Boys: Blood is Thicker than Water, that he wrote and co-directed with another member of the Bra Boys.

== Biography and surf career ==
Sunny Abberton is the oldest of four boys. The Abberton men were born in the eastern suburbs of Sydney to a heroin addicted mother and her criminal boyfriend (who was not their biological father).

Their grandmother, Mavis Abberton a.k.a. "Ma", opened her beach house to the boys. Soon the house was overflowing with other young boys that needed a safe place to spend time. "If anyone started 'Bra Boys' it was Ma," says Sunny in the Bra Boys documentary.

With the young men spending all of their time on the beach and in the water, Sunny quickly became a noteworthy surfer. In 1989 the then 16-year-old Sunny competed, and placed fourth, in the Australian Scholastic Titles in Victoria, Australia.

Before leaving for the world tour, Sunny established the Bra Boys with the hopes that they would look after one another while he was gone.

Their motto: "My Brother’s Keeper" was tattooed on the boys, sealing the bond that they had with one another. Years later after a heated argument between Sunny's brother, Koby, and their mother's boyfriend led to Koby getting hit in the head with a baseball bat, Sunny took Koby in to his own home.

With the influence of Sunny and the beach, Koby focused on surfing and quickly became one of the most well-known big wave surfers in the world.

== The Bra Boys ==
The Bra Boys began with the young boys that had been congregating at Ma's for years. The surf tribe concerned themselves with surfing the best waves and protecting their beach. Although they were a gang, they were a surf gang and surfing took priority over violence. The Bra Boys maintained a rough relationship with the authorities and other gangs in the area. The Bra Boys are protective of their home. In 2005, a heated exchange between Australians and Lebanese led to escalating retaliations between the two races. In these Cronulla Riots people were beaten, property was destroyed, and the beaches were made unsafe. Lebanese attacked Maroubra in return for the violence in Cronulla. The Maroubra Beach Bra Boys linked with local Pacific Islanders in protecting their beach and creating a peace between Maroubra and Cronulla.

== The Bra Boys Documentary and Controversy ==
Sunny Abberton was once a professional surfer, who has since become a documentary filmmaker. Abberton's film made history in Australia as being the highest-grossing documentary. Bra Boys, released in 2007, is a film about the surfing gang Bra Boys from Maroubra, New South Wales.

The documentary touches on a variety of subjects: Australia history, crime, violence, and surfing. The film is told from the co-founders of the Bra Boys, the Abberton brothers', perspective. The documentary was created as the Abberton's way of telling their story without unreliable media intrusions. Documenting his life as a Bra Boy has raised many questions and debates over both his film and his life. Many believe that the Bra Boys are misinterpreted. Others believe that he is leaving critical parts out of the film in order to create an image of Maroubra as a bad area that hardens those who are raised within its boundary lines.
