= Bra Boys (film) =

- Poster
- Directed by: Sunny Abberton, Macario De Souza
- Written by: Sunny Abberton, Stuart Beattie
- Produced by: Michael Lawrence
- Starring: Koby Abberton, Sunny Abberton, Jai Abberton
- Distributed by: Hopscotch Productions, Berkela Films
- Release date: 15 March 2007
- Running time: 90 minutes
- Country: Australia
- Language: English

Bra Boys is a 2007 Australian documentary film about a surf gang on Sydney's Maroubra Beach released in March 2007. The film details a story of the Bra Boys from the viewpoint of the gang members, particularly the Abbertons. Sunny Abberton wrote and co-directed the film with Macario De Souza. Actor Russell Crowe was producer and provided narration. The film's official cast included 49 well known surfers from Bra Boys members Evan Faulks and Richie 'Vas' Vaculik to ten-time world champion Kelly Slater. Other participating prominent surfers include Mark Occhilupo, Bruce Irons, and Laird Hamilton.

Australian reviewer Margaret Pomeranz gave the movie an overall positive review, while her At the Movies co-host David Stratton criticised it as a "not a very well made film ... basically not much more than a home movie" and questioned how objective a documentary can be when it is directed by its subject. Nick Schager of Slant magazine offered a critical review of the film, arguing that its mythologizing approach to Australian surf culture ultimately undermines its documentary credibility.

The documentary became Australia's highest-grossing non-IMAX documentary film and won the Best Documentary at the 2008 Movie EXTRA Filmink Awards. The movie saw a limited release in the United States that began on 11 April 2008, in 23 select locations in Southern California, New York and Hawaii. The film was distributed in Australia by Hopscotch Films and internationally by boutique distributor, Berkela Films. The film was released on DVD on 16 August 2007 with extras including the documentary, The Making of Bra Boys, extended surfing footage, coverage of the film's premiere, history of Australian surf culture, a fitness program presented by one of the Bra Boys, and music videos.

== Cast ==
- Russell Crowe as Narrator
- Kelly Slater
- Cheyne Horan
- Jack Kingsley
- Sean Doherty
- Koby Abberton
- Sunny Abberton
- Jai Abberton
- Wayne Cleveland
- Mark Mathews
- Wayne Bartholomew
- Nick Carroll
- Reni Maitua
- John Sutton
- Mark Occhilupo
- Richie 'Vas' Vaculik
- Laird Hamilton
- Bruce Irons
- Jesse Polock

== See also ==
- Cinema of Australia
