= Macario de Souza =

Australian filmmaker

Marcario De Souza (born 14 June 1983), sometimes known artistically as Kid Mac, is an Australian rapper, singer and filmmaker.

== Early life ==
Macario is the youngest of the three children of Macario Snr and Maria de Souza, who immigrated from Minas Gerais, Brazil, in the mid-1970s and settled in Sydney, Australia. His parents provided a traditional Brazilian influence in Macario's and his two sisters, Glenda and Ingrid's lives growing up. After attending Matraville public primary school, Macario went on to complete his HSC at South Sydney High School, graduating as school captain.

During his time at high school, de Souza explored music and film projects. "I was always in and out of punk rock bands in school but it wasn't until the Bra Boys film that I got the chance to professionally record my music".

De Souza was in the minority of his circle of friends, as he applied for and was accepted into university. "Maroubra is a party town. It is very easy to fall in that trap. I put in the hard yards at a crucial period through my teens. While everyone else was on the drink and on benders every weekend, I was putting in the work.”

Macario went on to study film and music production for a bachelor of fine arts degree, majoring in time-based art at UNSW Art & Design.

== Career ==
Since graduating university, de Souza has produced two short films, Ours and The Hard Way, the feature-length documentary Bra Boys: Blood is Thicker than Water, two eight-episode seasons of the reality television show Football Superstar for Foxtel, and a six-part documentary called South Side Story featuring Russell Crowe and the battle for the Rabbitohs football club.

Macario's first feature film, Bra Boys: Blood is Thicker than Water, was shot locally in and around Maroubra and edited in his family's apartment near Maroubra beach. It is presented as a documentary encompassing the lifestyle and ideals of the "Bra Boys" brotherhood. It portrays members of the Bra Boys reflecting on both the benefits and difficulties of growing up in Maroubra. Narrated by actor Russell Crowe, Bra Boys features three of Macario's original compositions in the soundtrack, which were written and recorded for the film.

In 2011 de Souza completed shooting his second feature-length film, Fighting Fear. The film features his two best friends and fellow Bra Boy members that he grew up with, big wave surfer Mark Matthews and Mixed Martial Arts champion Richie Vaculik. De Souza describes the film as "a story of friendship and redemption".

== Music ==
After Bra Boys, de Souza began building his brand, marketing himself with his music under the name of Kid Mac. He has collaborated musically and toured with these Australian and international recording artists:

- Mat McHugh and The Beautiful Girls (Aus)
- Mickey Avalon (USA)
- Marcello D2 (Brazil)
- Bliss N Eso (Aus)
- The Game (USA)
- Natiruts (Brazil)
- WU-TANG (USA)
- Lil John (USA)
- Dirt Nasty (USA)

De Souza remains an ambassador for the education of youth about the dangers of drug and alcohol abuse. In September 2011, De Souza, Vaculik and Mathews featured on the ABC's show Australian Story. The episode depicted the three friends recounting their experiences with alcohol-related incidents as teenagers and the lifelong consequences that can ensue from that pattern of behaviour. In February, De Souza became an ambassador for Feb Fast 2012, an organisation that raises money for alcohol problem awareness.

== Discography ==
The single Higher from the album Head Noise was released on October 18 2013;

The single Good Life was released on October 16 2020.

== Filmography ==
Film & Television	Year	Accolades
Ours	2004	Mambo Snap off the lip Surf film festival award, Youth Week Film Festival Award, Tracks Surfing Magazine DVD compilation
The Hard Way	2005	Mambo Snap off the lip Surf Film Festival
Bra Boys: Blood is Thicker than Water	2007	Narrated by Russell Crowe, Best documentary Film Ink Awards, Best Documentary X- Dance movie of the year, Best Documentary Surfer poll Awards 2008, Best Picture Mostra Film Festival
Football Superstar	2009/2010	Foxtel Reality Television
South Side Story	2011	Narrated by Russell Crowe
Fighting Fear	2011	Theatrical Release, Best performing Australian Documentary in Australian cinema's in 2011, Narrated by Joel Edgerton, Features 11 time world champion Kelly Slater, Bj Penn, Bruce Irons...
6 Festivals	2022	

== Awards and nominations ==
=== ARIA Music Awards ===
The ARIA Music Awards is an annual awards ceremony that recognises excellence, innovation, and achievement across all genres of the music of Australia. Fanning has won five awards.

Year	Nominee / work	Award	Result	Ref.
2022	"Wish You Well" (Baker Boy featuring Bernard Fanning) (dir. Macario de Souza)	Best Video	Nominated	
2024	"Beautiful Eyes" (Amy Shark) (dir. Macario de Souza)	Best Video	Nominated	
