= Jai Abberton =

Australian surfer

Jai Abberton (born c. 1973 in Maroubra, New South Wales), an Australian former professional surfer, is a member of the Australian surf group the Bra Boys. He rose to local prominence in 2005, when he was charged but found not guilty of the 2003 murder of stand-over man Anthony 'Tony' Hines. Despite Abberton admitting to shooting Hines, Abberton claimed that he had no choice as Hines was going to rape the girlfriend of Abberton, and kill them both. Abberton's defence was able to establish reasonable doubt of murder and that Hines was a violent man that employed standover tactics and was a rapist. It was alleged that the motivation for Hines' actions was a mistaken belief that Abberton had slept with Hines' wife, Rachel Gibbons.

Abberton was convicted in absentia by Magistrate Linden and fined $533; prosecutors allege that Abberton was tasered three times in the course of the incident, which occurred at the Byron Bay police station, following Abberton handing himself to police following damage to a caravan and a domestic incident. The Court was also advised that Abberton was admitted to a mental health unit after this incident but has only recently been kicked out of a north coast NSW drug rehabilitation centre, Bennelong's Haven, after testing positive to having the narcotic, opiate, in his system.

Together with his brothers, Koby, Sunny, and Dakota, Jai Abberton achieved national and international attention in 2007 with the release of a feature-length documentary entitled Bra Boys: Blood is Thicker than Water, written and directed by members of the Bra Boys.
