= Maroubra, New South Wales =

Maroubra
- Suburb
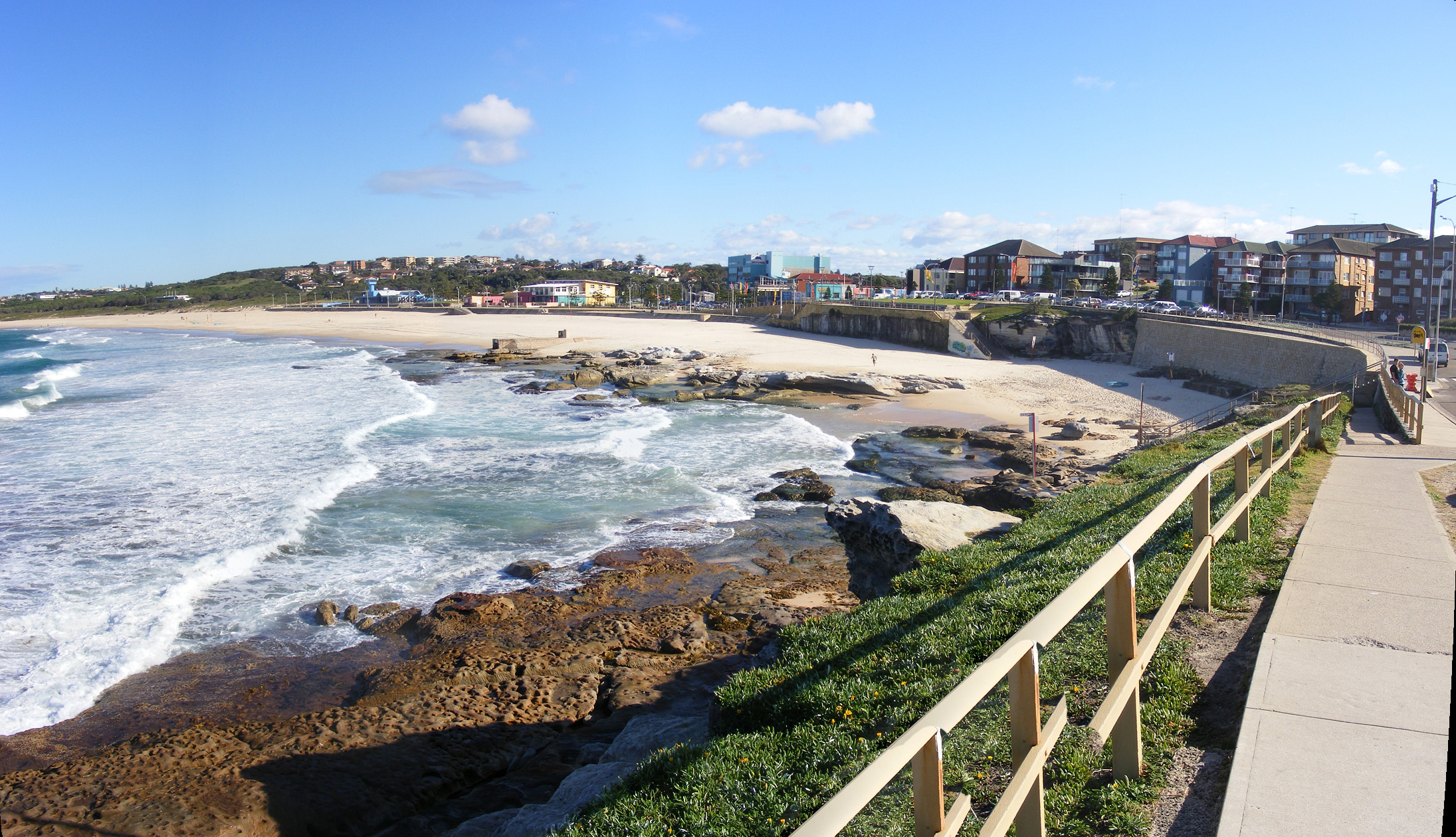
- Maroubra Beach

- Interactive map of Maroubra
- Country: Australia
- State: New South Wales
- City: Sydney
- LGA: City of Randwick
- Location: 10 km (6.2 mi) south-east of Sydney CBD
- Established: 1910

Government
  - State electorate: Maroubra
  - Federal division: Kingsford Smith
- Elevation: 5 m (16 ft)

Population
  - Total: 30,722 (2021 census)
- Time zone: UTC+10 (AEST)
  - Summer (DST): UTC+11 (AEDT)
- Postcode: 2035
Suburbs around Maroubra
Kingsford	Randwick	Coogee
Pagewood	Maroubra	South Coogee
Hillsdale	Matraville	Malabar

Maroubra (/məˈruːbrə/ mə-ROO-brə) is a beachside suburb in the Eastern Suburbs of Sydney, in the state of New South Wales, Australia. It is 10 kilometres south-east of the Sydney central business district in the local government area of the City of Randwick.

Maroubra is the largest suburb within Randwick City Council by both area and population. Maroubra Junction is a locality in the centre of the suburb.

== History ==
=== 1700s ===
At the time of British colonisation, the area was inhabited by the Indigenous Australian Murro-ore-dial clan of the Eora people. Maroubra is derived from the name of a clan leader, Moorooboora (muru, meaning pathway and boora, meaning initiation ground). In particular, his name refers to the pathway that went to the initiation ground that was at Boora Point which is now the site of a national park.

=== 1800s ===
In 1861, the first British house was built in the area by Humphrey McKeon, after whom McKeon Street was named. A number of other settlers arrived on the land in the 1870s to work on the wool scouring works located at the northern end of the bay.

=== The Hereward ===
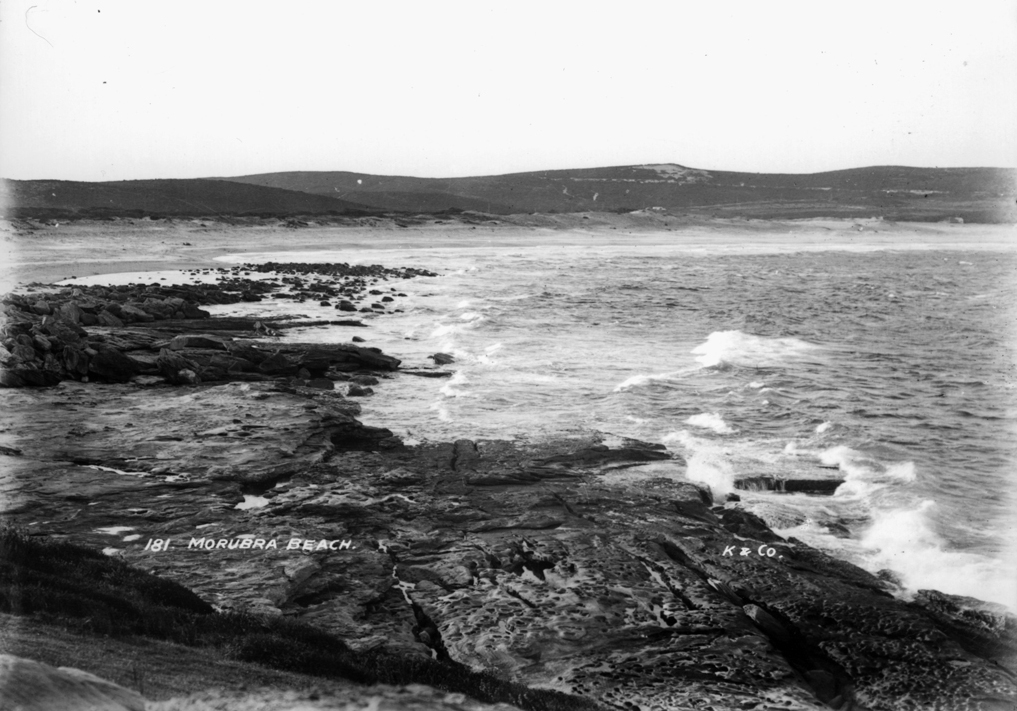
Maroubra Beach, Kerry and Co., c.1900

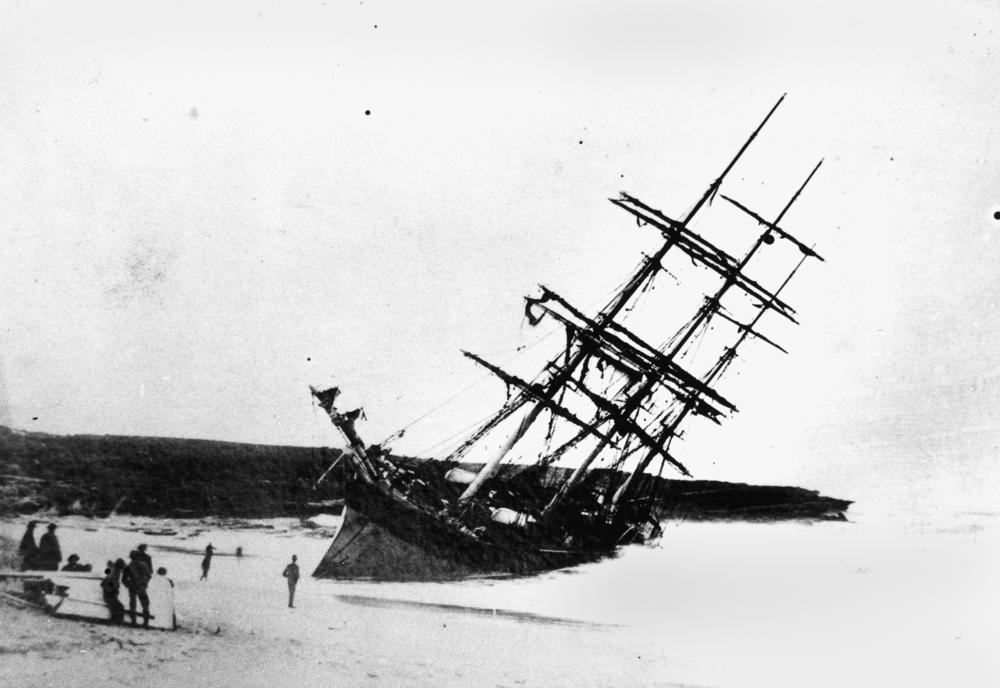
The Hereward wrecked on Maroubra Beach, May 1898

The suburb first made headlines on 6 May 1898, when the Hereward, a fully rigged iron ship weighing 1,513 tons was caught by the gale-force winds and shipwrecked at the northern end of Maroubra Beach while heading north toward Newcastle. The shipwreck remained on the beach for a number of years until a failed attempt to refloat it was made by building a coffer dam around the wreck.

The wreck was slowly washed out to sea afterwards; and by 1937 only a triangle dorsal fin was visible above sea level. In 1950, Randwick Council feared the danger that the remains posed, especially to surfers and swimmers, and had the remains blasted; such that by 1967 it appeared that there was nothing left of the ship.

In recent times, on various occasions, due to large swells and sweeping currents, large amounts of sand had moved off the sea floor and had exposed extensive portions of the Hereward which were once thought to be destroyed and lost forever. In March 2013 after large seas, extensive portions of the ship's metal hull, along with mast and engine pieces were exposed to a greater extent than they ever had been before.

Hereward Street in Maroubra is named after the event.

=== 1900s ===
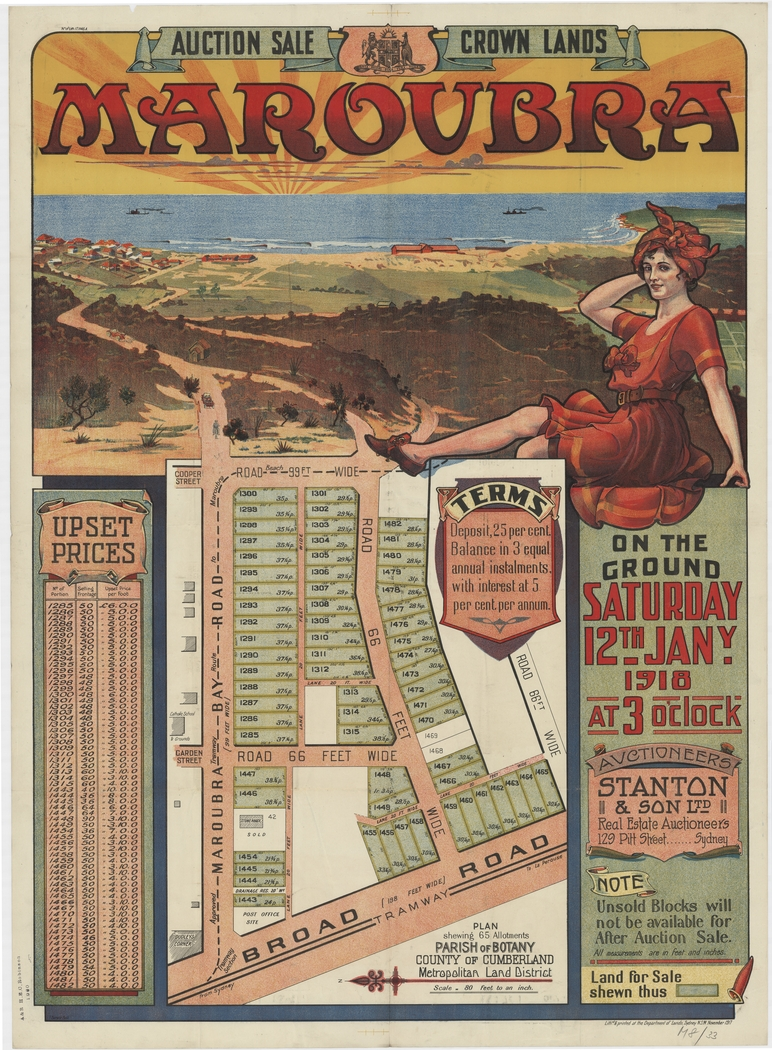
Maroubra subdivision plan, 12 January 1918, Z/SP/M8

Major residential development only began in the 1910s after Herbert Dudley, a real estate developer, subdivided the land into residential blocks. Herbert Dudley also lobbied for the extension of the tramline to Maroubra Junction in 1912, where he had built Dudley's Emporium which has just recently been redeveloped. In 1918 sixty-five allotments on Crown Lands bordered by Maroubra Bay Road, Cooper Street and Broad Road were auctioned by Stanton and Son Limited. The tram line was extended to Maroubra Beach in 1921.

Between 1925 and 1934, the Maroubra Speedway (officially, Olympia Motor Speedway) was located in South Maroubra at the corner of Anzac Parade and Fitzgerald Avenue. However, due to the dangerous nature of the concrete track, a number of deaths occurred and it was closed after only nine years of operation. Coral Sea Park and surrounding estates was announced on the site in 1947 and formally completed in 1961. The name of the estates and the park commemorate the 1942 Battle of the Coral Sea.

=== 2000s ===
In 2005, Maroubra was named as one of the suburbs involved in the Cronulla Riots, after more than 100 cars were vandalised in relation to the riots between Middle Eastern and Anglo youth. In 2006, Maroubra Beach became the second Australian beach to be named a National Surfing Reserve (the first beach being Bells Beach in Victoria). It is also a popular place for people learning to surf due to its, sometimes, beginner friendly conditions.

=== Maroubra Junction and surrounding areas ===
Maroubra Junction is one of the main shopping areas in the district and is home to Pacific Square shopping centre (built on the area once known as Stockland Mall, Maroubra). Commercial developments are also found along Anzac Parade, Maroubra Road and surrounding streets, including Dudley's Emporium which was the first shopping centre in Maroubra Junction built in 1912 and has been recently redeveloped.

=== Maroubra Beach and surrounds ===
There are also a handful of shopping districts besides Maroubra Junction including the areas surrounding Maroubra Beach. McKeon Street and Marine Parade are home to multiple cafes and restaurants, and other retail facilities such as surf shops, yoga schools, a chemist and newsagent, the Maroubra Seals Club.

=== South Maroubra ===
South Maroubra Shopping Village, known as "The Village", is located in South Maroubra and is home to many well-known shops including a late night pharmacy as well as a supermarket.

== Hotels ==
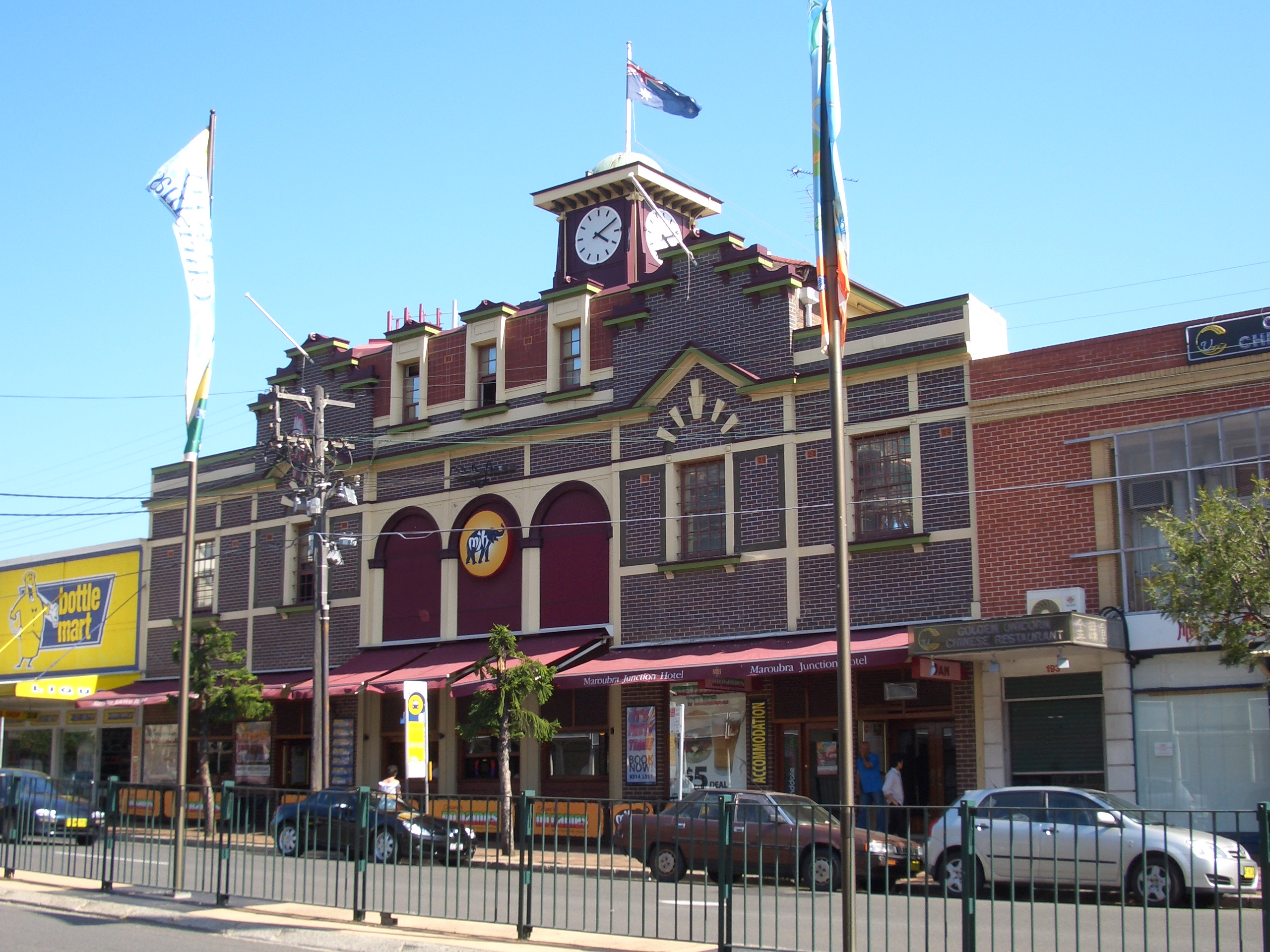
Maroubra Junction Hotel

=== Current ===
- Glasshouse (Since 1947) – The licence of the Golden Grove Hotel was transferred from Darlington to new premises on the corner of Anzac Parade and Boyce Road, Maroubra Junction in February 1947. The hotel has more recently changed its name to the Glasshouse Hotel.
- The Sands Hotel (Since 1972) – A hotel in South Maroubra alongside South Maroubra Shopping Village. Now rebranded to Southend Hotel though many locals still call it the Sands.
- Maroubra Junction Hotel (Since 1926) — A hotel in Maroubra Junction across Maroubra Road from Pacific Square.
- Ocean View Tavern (Since 2010) – In an attempt to popularise the mostly vacant area surround Maroubra Beach, the Maroubra Bay Hotel premises was revitalised and re-opened under the name of the Ocean View Tavern. Since recalled the Bay Hotel circa 2017.
- Juniors @ The Junction (Since 2009) – The result of a merger with South Sydney Junior Rugby League Club (Kingsford) and the struggling Maroubra Returned and Services League (RSL) Club. The club is on the site of the former Maroubra RSL club on Anzac Parade and Haig Street.

=== Former ===
- Maroubra Bay Hotel (1926–2010) – Popular after World War I due to the extension of the tram line to the beach, the construction of a promenade and bathing sheds. Due to a downturn in trade the hotel closed in early 2010. Reopened as the Bay Hotel, nearby is the Maroubra Seals surf club (pub, gaming and restaurant).
- Trade Winds (1984–2002) – Maroubra Junction on Maroubra Road. 2002 saw the former Flag Inns hotel converted into apartments. It was one of the many hotels that catered to the visiting Maroubra crowd on a global scale during the Sydney 2000 Olympic Games, being one of the major accommodation hotels in the Sydney region at the turn of the century. The Trade Winds Brasserie is all that is left of the old hotel.
- Maroubra RSL (2000–2009) – The struggling Maroubra Returned and Services League (RSL) Club merged with South Sydney Junior Leagues Club in order to keep the premise open due to poor income. It was reopened under the name "Juniors @ The Junction".

== Transport ==
=== Roads ===
The CBD is located 10 kilometres north-west from Maroubra via Anzac Parade, via Kensington, Kingsford and Moore Park.

=== Buses ===
Regular bus services through Maroubra are operated by Transdev John Holland.

=== Trams ===
The former Maroubra tram line opened from Anzac Parade to Maroubra Bay in 1921. The line branched off the main line to La Perouse at the intersection of Anzac Parade and Maroubra Road, travelling east along Maroubra Road, Cooper Street, French Street and Mons Avenue before terminating in a balloon loop in Marine Parade at Maroubra Bay Beach. The line was double track throughout, and passed through several tram reservations on its descent down to the beach. Direct services operated from Circular Quay and Railway Square. The line closed in 1961.

== Heritage listings ==
Due to the age of the suburb, there are 34 sites formally recognised by the NSW Office of Environment and Heritage as providing a "sense of continuity and belonging to the place where we live". None of these sites, however, have been protected under Section 136 of the NSW Heritage Act.

== Media ==
Maroubra is within the reporting and circulation boundaries of the South-Eastern Suburbs newspaper; "Southern Courier" which is owned and distributed by News Limited.

Maroubra is also within the reporting and circulation boundaries of The Beast, a monthly magazine for the beaches and bays of Sydney's east. It covers local news, sport and the arts and each month. It features a different local celebrity on the cover.

Maroubra was home to the set of the television series Heartbreak High which was filmed at Maroubra Bay High School after its closure. The suburb also features in the 2022 Netflix reboot with South Sydney High School serving as a primary filming location.

The German electronic musician Edgar Froese included a track called Maroubra Bay on his 1975 album Epsilon in Malaysian Pale, which was influenced by a visit to Maroubra during Tangerine Dream's 1975 Australian tour.

In 1963 "Little Pattie" reached No. 2 on the Australian Top40 with her hit EP singles "Stomping at Maroubra" and "He's My Blonde-Headed, Stompie Wompie, Real Gone Surfer Boy"

In 1983, the music video and cover artwork for Come Said the Boy by Mondo Rock were filmed in Maroubra.

The opening sequence of Everything in Between (2022) was filmed at Mistral Point, Maroubra.

== Sport and recreation ==
A number of well-known sporting teams represent the local area. One of them is the NRL club named the South Sydney Rabbitohs. Maroubra along with the rest of the South Eastern Suburbs was originally represented by the Sydney Roosters (the team was called 'Eastern Suburbs' back then) but due to junior team boundaries being moved in the mid 20th century (a contentious point for many locals) Maroubra is now often viewed as the starting point for South Sydney homeland in the East. Officially however at a senior level the original articles of association from 1908 still haven't been changed meaning technically the Roosters still represent the area. Due to this you can often still find many locals who support them however the general consensus is that it is Rabbitohs territory now, especially with the establishment of their performance centre at nearby Heffron Park. At a junior level the suburb is represented by the Maroubra Lions.

Some other teams are Maroubra Surf Life Saving Club, South Maroubra Surf Life Saving Club, Maroubra Bodyboard Club and Maroubra Surf Riders Club.

The South Maroubra Dolphins Winter Swimming Club and Maroubra Seals Winter Swimming Club swim at Wylie's Baths and compete against Bondi Icebergs Winter Swimming Club, Cottesloe Crabs, Cronulla Polar Bears Winter Swimming Club, Coolangatta Surf Life Saving Club, Clovelly Eskimos Winter Swimming Club, Bronte Splashers, Wollongong Whales and Coogee Penguins Winter Swimming Club in the Winter Swimming Association of Australia Championships

Maroubra Beach is listed as a national surfing reserve, as a result, it has played host to many surfing competitions. The most notable of which was the 2004 Snickers Australian Open where then-six time world champion Kelly Slater won. The event was covered in the Bra Boys movie, Bra Boys: Blood is Thicker than Water.

=== Other events ===
Due to the large size of Maroubra beach, it has also been used for sports other than surfing. One of the more highly covered events was the 2007 Beach Cricket series which saw Maroubra Beach play home to Round Three of the series between Australia, England and West Indies. The round saw Australia and England progress to the finals which were played the following day, again at Maroubra.

== Places of worship ==
Christian

- Holy Family Catholic Church – originally St Aidan's Catholic Church
- St. Mary & St. Joseph Catholic Church
- Our Lady of the Annunciation Catholic Church
- St Johns Anglican Church
- St Edmund's Anglican Church (also known as Wild Street Church)
- Maroubra Baptist Church
- Salvation Army Maroubra
- Maroubra Presbyterian Church (also known as St. Andrew Presbyterian Memorial Church)
- Hope Uniting Church
- Maroubra Bay Uniting Church
- C3 Church Maroubra
- Maroubra Surfers Church

Other

- AuGuang Maitreya
- Kingsford Maroubra Hebrew Orthodox Congregation
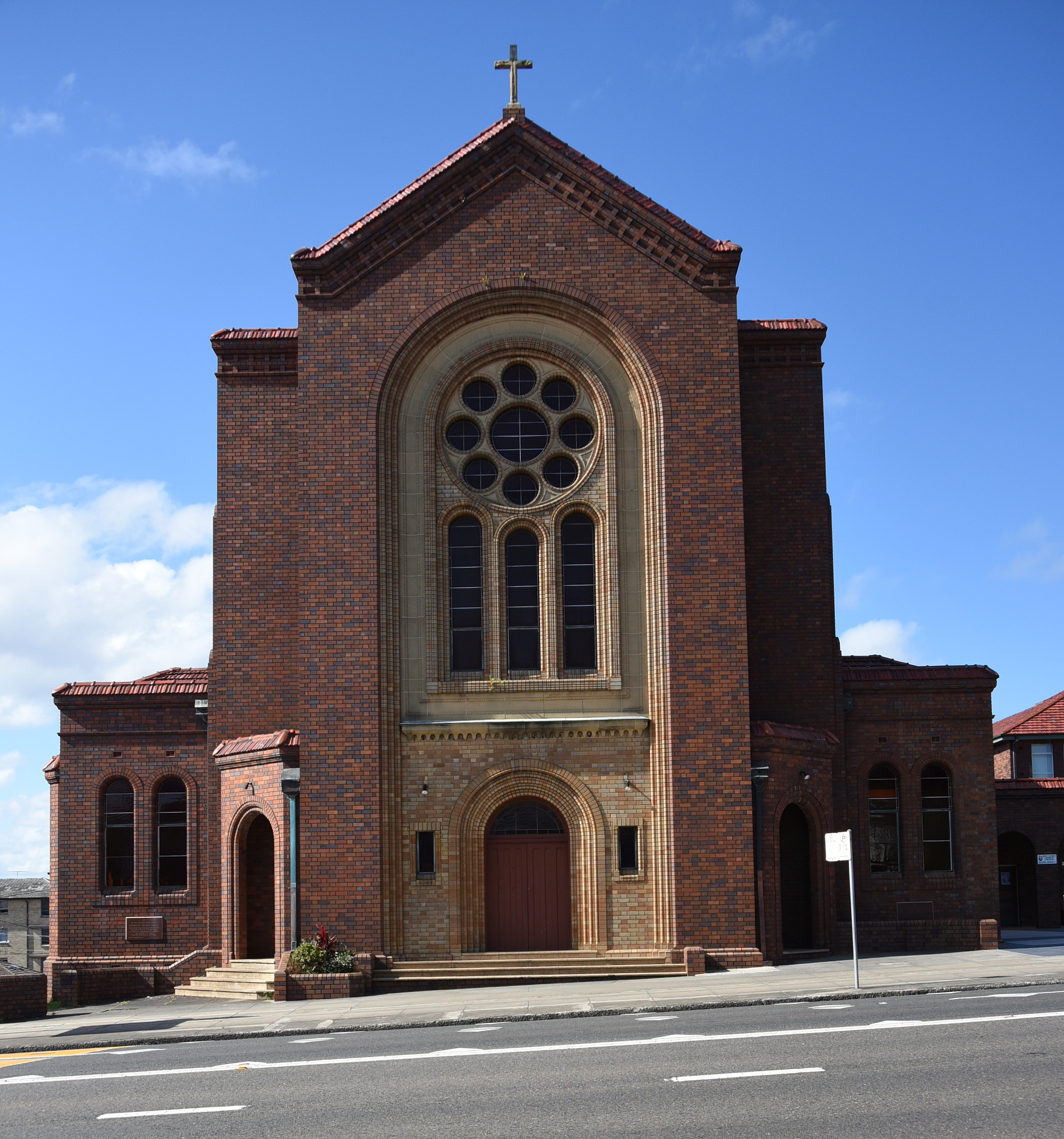
Holy Family Catholic Church

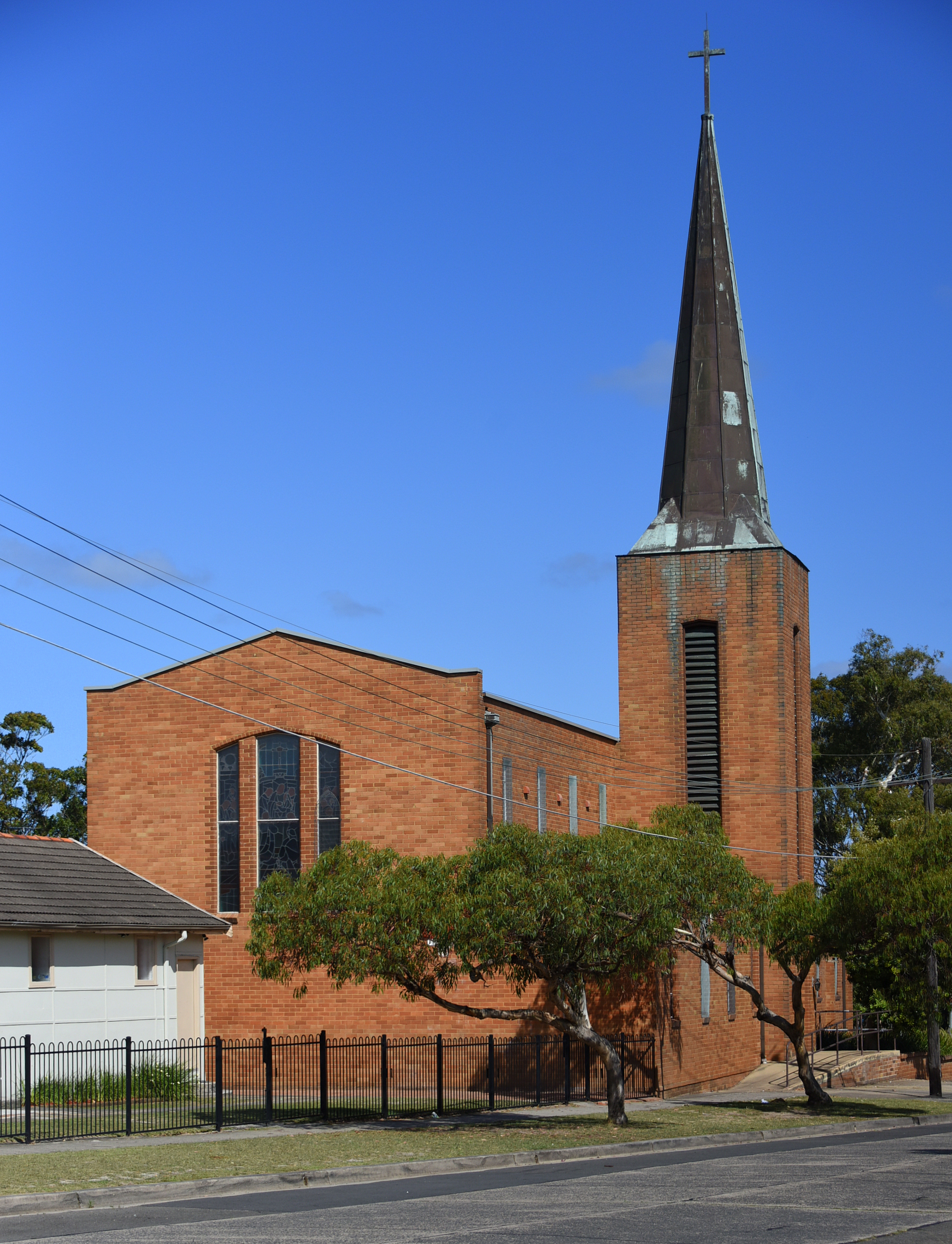
Wild Street Anglican Church

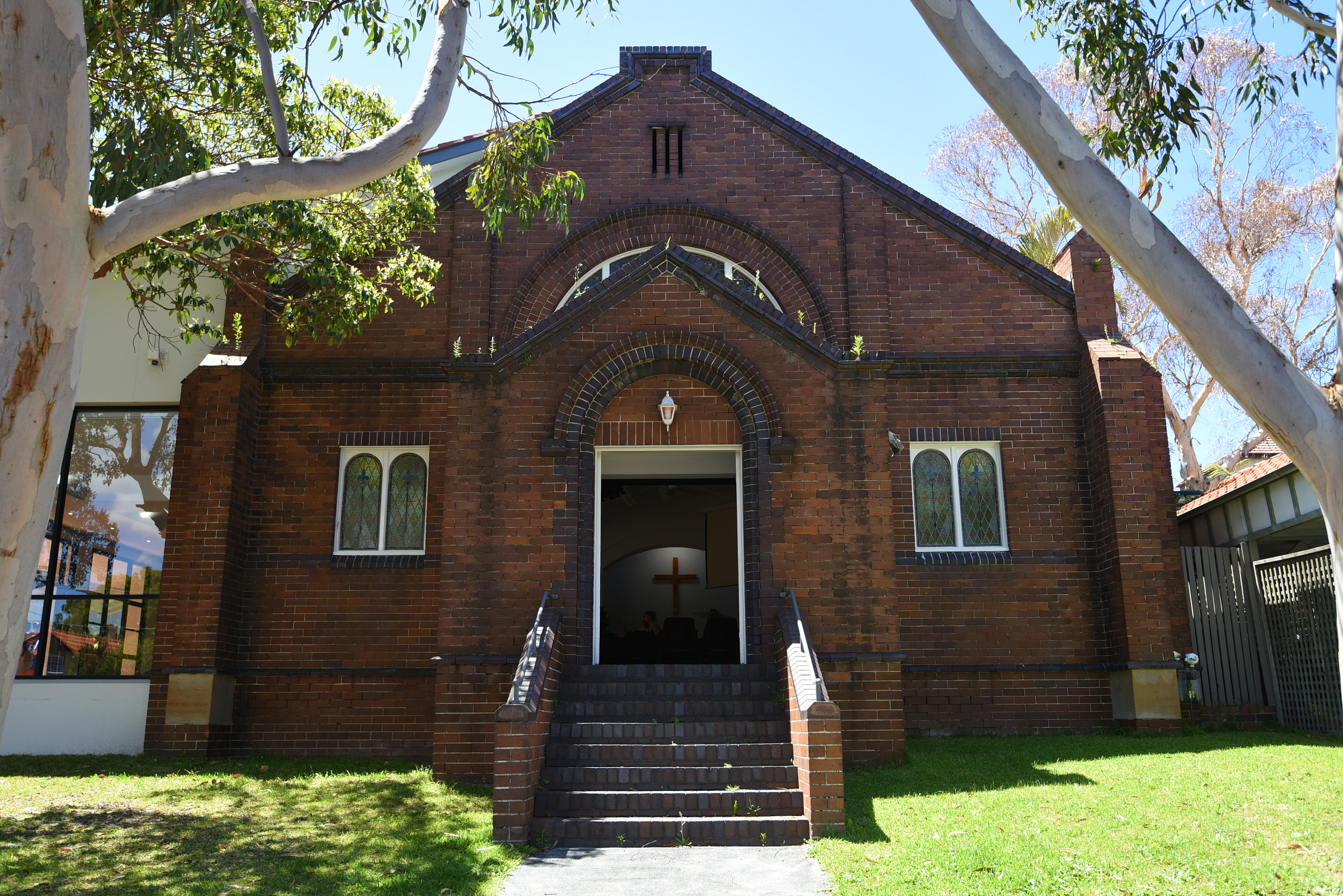
Maroubra Baptist Church

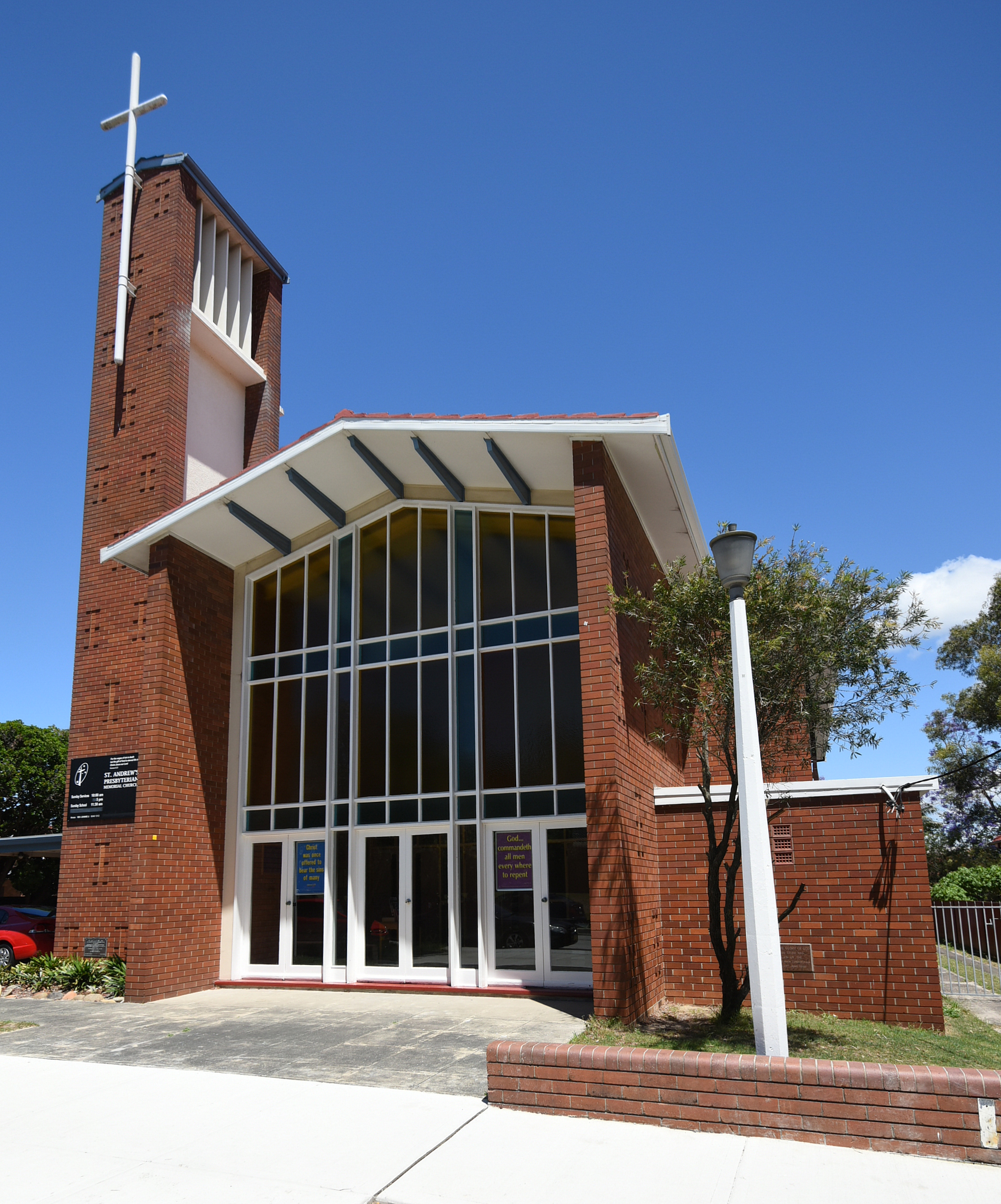
St. Andrew Presbyterian Memorial Church

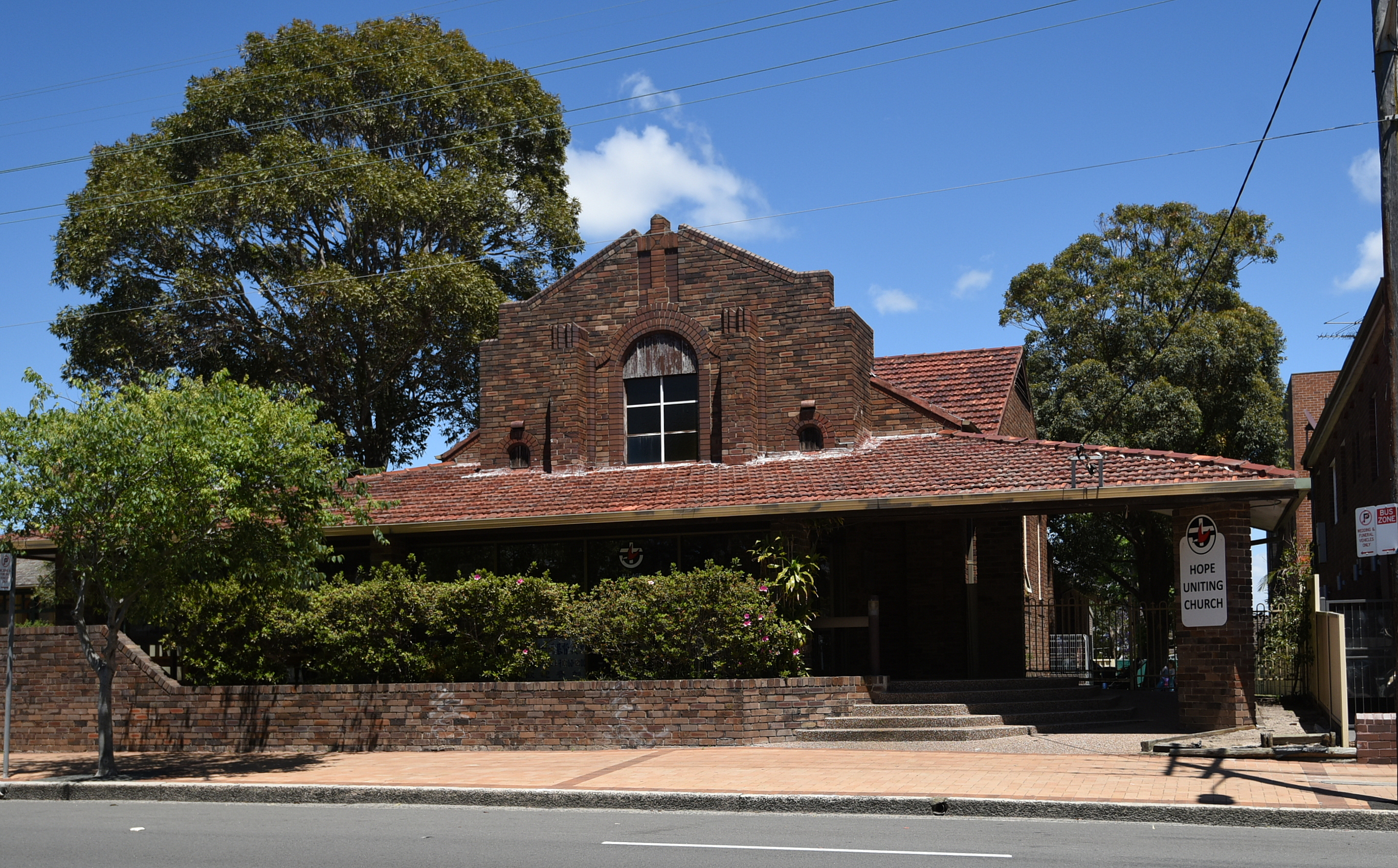
Hope Uniting Church

== Healthcare ==
Maroubra is located close to the Prince of Wales Hospital in Randwick. As a result, there are several clinics and out-patient services run by Prince of Wales Hospital located in Maroubra, such as the Maroubra Centre that provides support to people living with mental illness. Maroubra is also home to a NSW Ambulance station; located on Mons Avenue near Maroubra Beach.

== Schools ==
=== Current ===
- St Spyridon College
- Lycée Condorcet (The International French School of Sydney)
- Maroubra Bay Public School
- Maroubra Junction Public School
- Mount Sinai College
- South Sydney High School
- St Aidan's Primary School
- St Mary St Joseph Primary School
- Champagnat Catholic College Pagewood
- Our Lady of the Annuciation Primary School

=== Closed ===
- Maroubra High School (1962–2002): premises now in use by Lycée Condorcet
- Maroubra Bay High School: premises no longer existent – residential estate in place of former grounds. Famous for being the school used for the TV Series Heartbreak High.
- Brigidine College Maroubra: moved to Randwick and became Brigidine College Randwick. The grounds have since been redeveloped into St Brigid's Green, a retirement village.

== Maroubra Beach and parklands ==
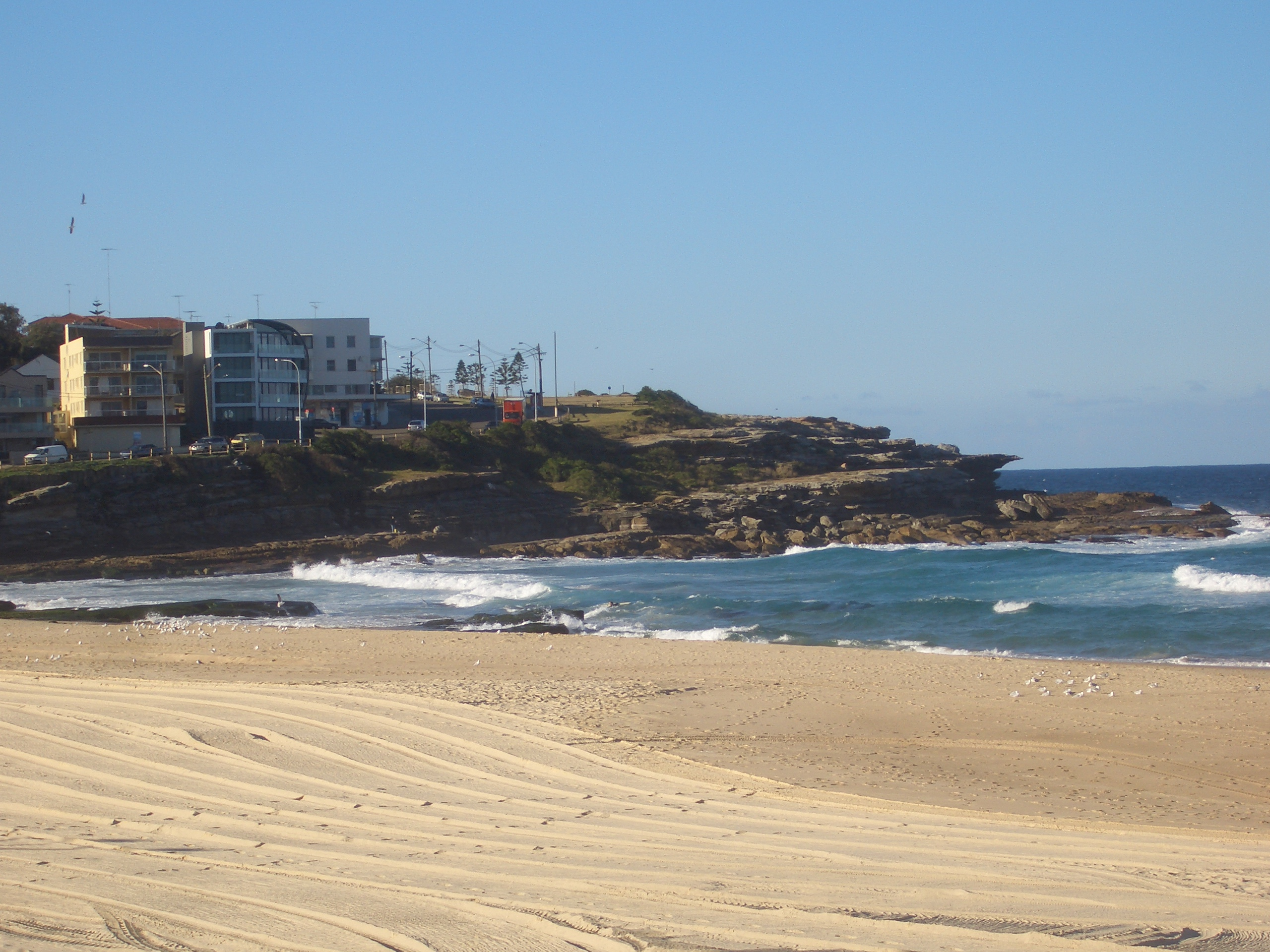
Maroubra Beach

Maroubra Beach stretches for approximately 1 km on Maroubra Bay. Mahon Pool is located north of the beach, near Mistral Point. There are two surf clubs at Maroubra: Maroubra Surf Life Saving Club and South Maroubra Surf Life Saving Club. Arthur Byrne Reserve sits behind both these clubs. A skating park is located at the southern end of Maroubra Beach.

The word "Maroubra" originates from an Aboriginal word meaning "like thunder", which refers to the surf conditions and the sounds of the waves. The length of Maroubra Beach and good surf conditions provide additional photographic opportunities for the local photographers. There are numerous photography guides for Maroubra Beach and Mahon Pool and professional photographers showcase photos from this place as a part of their portfolio.

Maroubra has some large parklands, the most popular being the reserve along the waterfront at Maroubra Beach, called Arthur Byrne Reserve. The reserve has an enclosed children's playground to the north of the blue Pavilion building at North Maroubra, close to the car park. There are barbecue facilities and tables for picnickers. There are public ablution facilities inside the blue Pavilion building. Arthur Byrne Reserved is the home to the Oktoberfest/Fun Run every year.

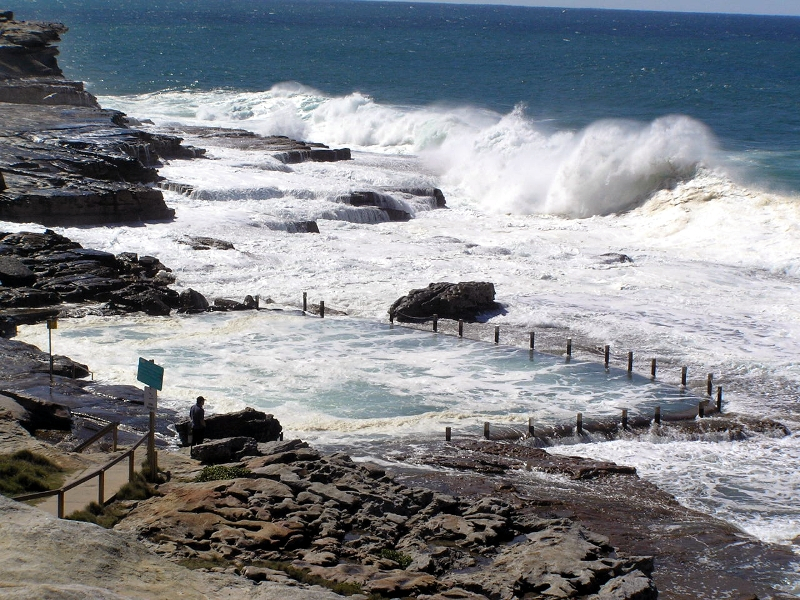
Mahon Pool

Heffron Park, on Fitzgerald Avenue and between Bunnerong Road and Robey Street is a particularly large park. It accommodates the Des Renford Leisure Centre with indoor and outdoor pools, tennis courts, sports fields, parklands, and a two kilometre cycle track which is used for time trials and is accessible for public use at other times.

Nagle Park, on Wild Street between Walsh Avenue and Holden Street, is a flat parkland equipped for use as a sports facility. It is also a popular dog park, with dogs permitted off-lead.

Snape Park, on Snape Street between Hannan and Percival Streets is equipped with popular tennis facilities and sports fields and is frequently used for organised sporting events.

Central Park, at the corner of Cooper and Storey Streets, has a flat parkland with an excellent bicycle track for young children built of smooth concrete. This park also has playground equipment.

Coral Sea Park, south of Yorktown Parade, has a flat area that provides several sports fields. It has playground equipment at its south end.

=== Magic Point ===
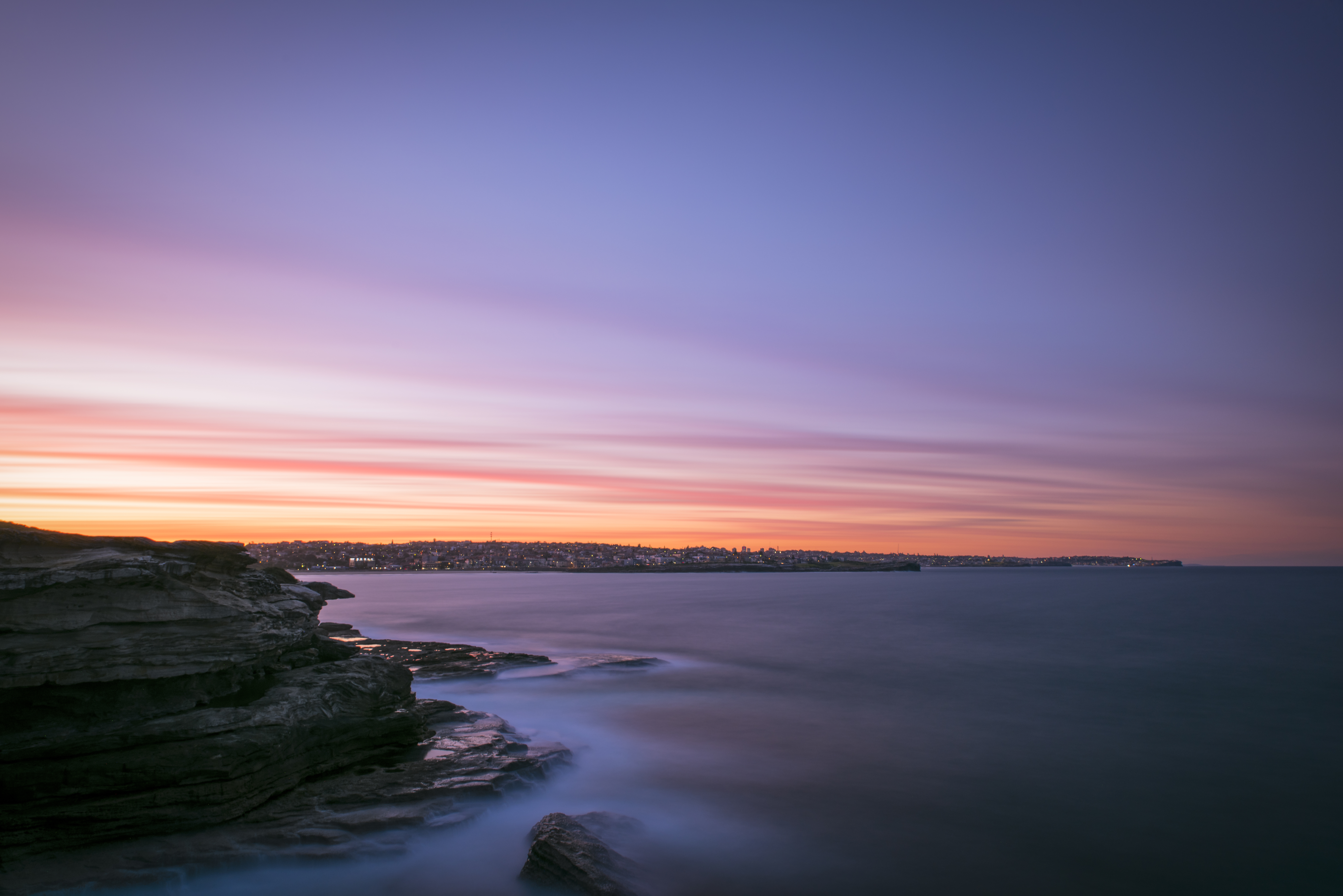
Magic Point

Magic Point is a coastal headland in Maroubra, Sydney, New South Wales, Australia. It is about 10 km south of Sydney's central business district. It is a rugged heathland area with cliffs overlooking the ocean.

Magic Point is well known as a location for watching seabirds. It is also a popular diving site and is important for the protection of grey nurse sharks.

== Demographics ==
Historical population
Year	Pop.	±%
2001	25,350	—
2006	26,538	+4.7%
2011	29,594	+11.5%
2016	30,688	+3.7%
2021	30,722	+0.1%

In the 2021 Census, there were 30,722 people in Maroubra.

- 42.3% were married and 10.8% were either divorced or separated.
- 53.5% were born in Australia.
- The next most common countries of birth were England 4.0%, China 3.4%, Brazil 3.2%, Indonesia 2.2% and Ireland 1.9%.
- The most common ancestries in Maroubra were English 22.6%, Australian 19.2%, Chinese 12.6%, Irish 11.5% and Greek 6.9%.
- 27.4% had both parents born in Australia, 12.3% had one parent born overseas, and 55.0% had both parents born overseas.
- 59.9% spoke only English at home.
- Other languages spoken at home included Greek 4.3%, Mandarin 3.9%, Cantonese 3.7%, Portuguese 3.5% and French 2.8%.
- The most common responses for religion were No Religion 33.4% and Catholic 28.1%.

== Notable people ==
- Dakota Abberton, surfer with Bra Boys
- Jai Abberton, surfer with Bra Boys
- Koby Abberton, surfer with Bra Boys
- Sunny Abberton, surfer with Bra Boys
- Corey Adams, rugby league player
- Henry Lawrie Bell, Army officer and amateur ornithologist
- Mark Buddle, outlaw bikie and alleged gangster.
- Bob Carr, 39th Premier of New South Wales
- Michael Daley, Current Member of the Maroubra State Electorate
- Tilly Devine, Sydney crime identity
- Peter Doyle, writer
- Alby Falzon, filmmaker, photographer and publisher
- Ron Finneran, paralympian
- Ross Freeman, politician
- Greta Hayes, hockey player
- Bob Heffron, 30th Premier of New South Wales
- Brian Langton, politician
- Jason Yat-Sen Li, politician
- Alison MacCallum, singer
- Reni Maitua, rugby league player
- Mark Mathews, Professional Big Wave Surfer
- Tim Metcher, rugby union player
- Daniel Michel, paralympian
- Jack Munn, rugby league player
- John Norton, Newspaper editor
- Susan Ryan, former politician
- Guy Sebastian, Australian pop, R&B, and soul singer-songwriter' winner of the first season of Australian Idol in 2003.
- Greg Smith, politician
- John Sutton, rugby league player for the South Sydney Rabbitohs
- Daniel Swain, tennis player
- Fred Thompson, rugby union player
- Candice Warner, ironwoman
- David Warner, Australian cricketer
- Mike Whitney, TV personality (Sydney Weekender, Who Dares Wins), and former cricket player for the NSW Blues and Australia

== See also ==
- Magic Point
- Maroubra Speedway
