= Koby Abberton =

Australian professional surfer

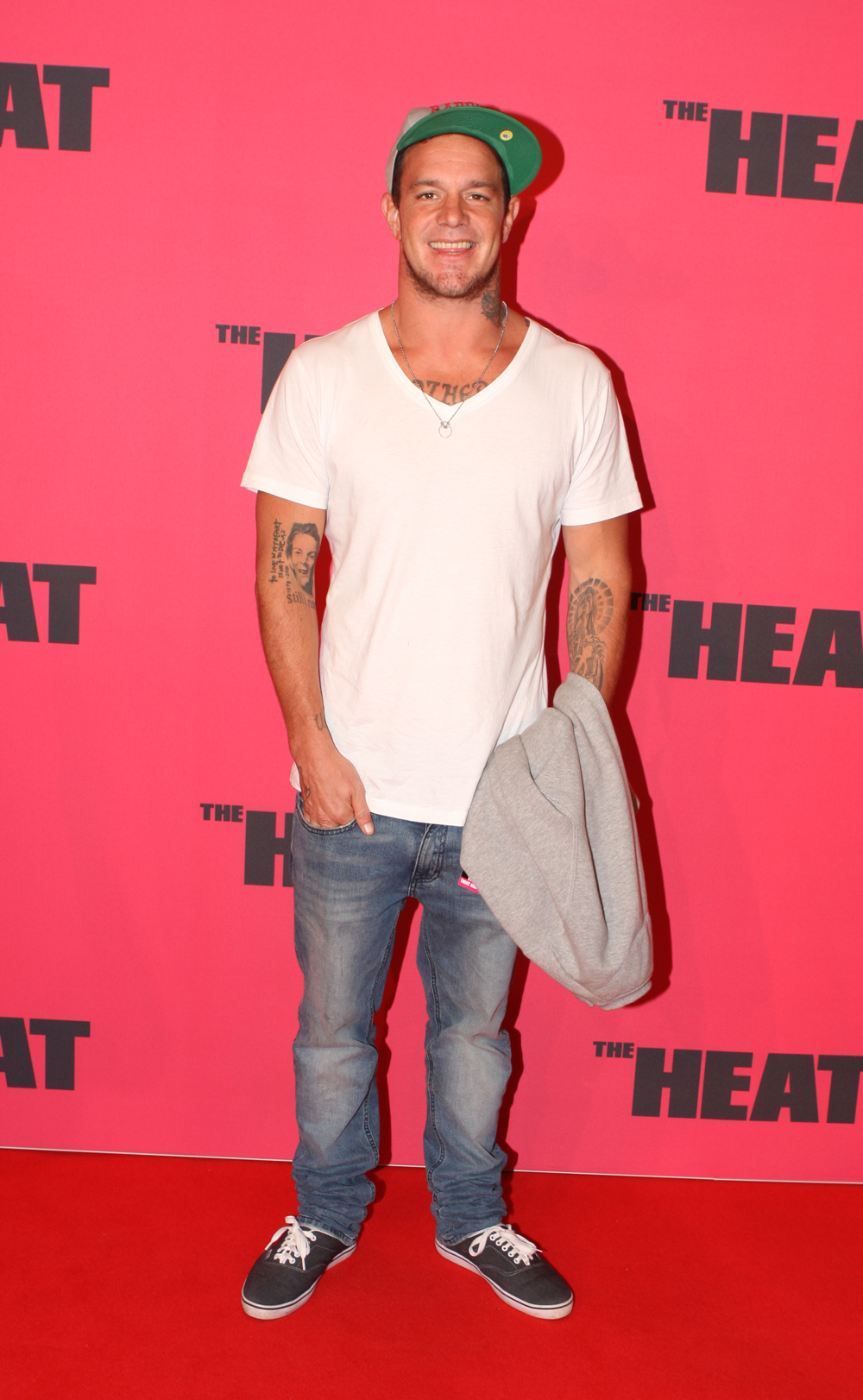
- Koby Abberton in July 2013
- Born: 2 June 1979 (age 47); Maroubra, Sydney, New South Wales, Australia
- Occupations: Surfer; actor
- Years active: 1998−present
- Spouse: Olya Nechiporenko (engaged)
- Children: Sunny Makua Abberton

Koby Abberton (born 2 June 1979), an Australian former professional surfer, is a member of the Australian surf gang the Bra Boys. He rose to local prominence in 2006, when he was found guilty of perverting the course of justice in an incident surrounding his brother Jai Abberton, who was charged but found not guilty of the 2003 murder of stand-over man Anthony 'Tony' Hines. Together with his brothers, Abberton achieved national and international attention in 2007 with the release of a feature-length documentary entitled Bra Boys: Blood is Thicker than Water, written and directed by members of the Bra Boys. In November 2008, Koby Abberton was jailed for three days by a US court after being found guilty of assaulting an off-duty police officer in a fight outside a nightclub in Honolulu, Hawaii. In 2021, Koby appeared on the TV show SAS Australia.

== Biography and surfing career ==
Abberton was born in the south-eastern Sydney beach-side suburb of Maroubra to a heroin-addicted mother and a criminally inclined father (who was not his biological father but instead his mother's boyfriend), living in the "housing commission capital of Sydney". Abberton states that his home birth was not a result of specified choice, but as a method of avoiding the hospital where he says his mother "knew she'd get in trouble for being on heroin". Abberton is one of four children and brother to Jai, Sunny, and Dakota Abberton, all surfers.

Abberton describes the start of his career as the time when his "life got better." a disagreement with Abberton's mother's boyfriend, who Koby said when he got home one afternoon, chased him out of the house with a baseball bat. He then chose to re-locate to his older brother Sunny's house. Of the argument Abberton says "I just started crying. He [Sunny Abberton] said "Don't worry, just try to forget about it and put everything you've got into your surfing. That's our way out of this life," and that's when it all started." Abberton pursued his surfing career, going on to achieve sponsorship and international recognition for his abilities and achievements.

In November 2010, Abberton was announced as one of 24 alternates to the 26th Annual The Eddie at Waimea Bay, Hawaii. The event was to be held on one day, between 1 December 2010 and 28 February 2011, when waves exceed the 20-foot (6.1 metres) minimum threshold to contend for the US$98,000 prize purse.

== Bra Boys and acting career ==
The Bra Boys are held together by surfing as well as community ties. The group is often linked with the Maroubra Surfers Association, with which a number of its members are associated. In an interview on Triple J radio, Abberton pointed out the "Bra" is a reference to the gang's suburb, Maroubra, and partly after the street slang for brother. Some members of the surf tribe tattoo "My Brother's Keeper" across the front of their chest. A key motivation for Abberton to start the Bra Boys was his personal experience with heroin:

"When I was about 14, our crew started the Bra Boys, and basically started controlling the place. We said there's not going to be any heroin in Maroubra anymore, because we didn't want drugs in the place."

In 2004, Abberton starred in a 40-minute short documentary film called Second Thoughts, released on video, that was directed and produced by Timmy Turner. The film was shot on location in Indonesia and Abberton acted as himself. The film had a surfing theme. The Abberton family were featured in a 2005 episode of ABC TV Australian Story where Abberton again performed as himself.

Abberton, together with his brothers, were featured in the autobiographical documentary entitled Bra Boys: Blood is Thicker than Water, written and co-directed by Sunny Abberton and narrated by actor Russell Crowe. The award-winning documentary detailed the lives of the Abberton family and the Bra Boys.

== Controversy ==
=== The murder of Anthony Hines ===
In 2003, Abberton became entangled in a court case resulting from the death of a Sydney underworld figure, Anthony 'Tony' Hines. His older brother, Jai, was charged with the 2003 murder of Hines and was acquitted 2005, claiming self-defense, even though he admitted to shooting Hines.

Appearing in court on 5 August 2003 on three counts of false statements to police, Abberton pleaded not guilty to being an accessory after the fact to murder but changed his plea to guilty on 21 March 2004. Despite his brother's acquittal of criminal charges, on 24 November 2004, NSW District Court Acting Judge Brian Boulten handed Koby Abberton a suspended nine-month jail sentence after being found guilty of perverting the course of justice in the same matter. During the time of these criminal proceedings, Abberton lost a string of lucrative sponsorship deals he had contracted through his professional surfing career. Despite surfing sponsor and surfwear giant Oakley initially sticking by Abberton, they later withdrew a $250,000 annual sponsorship.

=== Cronulla Beach riots, 2005 ===
The Abberton brothers and numerous members of the Bra Boys received negative coverage in Australian media following the racially charged 2005 Sydney race riots originating between opposing ethnic mobs on Cronulla beach. The negative media coverage motivated further rioting of the same racially charged nature on a string of other popular Sydney beaches, said to be an attempt to address the reported incidents of assaults and intimidatory behavior by groups of non-locals, some of whom were identified in earlier media reports as youths of Middle Eastern appearance from the suburbs of Western Sydney. In the lead up to the riots, Abberton spoke to The Daily Telegraph about the assault of a lifeguard that sparked the incident, claiming:

"The reason why it's not happening at Maroubra is because of the Bra Boys. Girls go to Cronulla, Bondi, everywhere else in Sydney and get harassed, but they come to Maroubra and nothing happens to them. I read all this stuff about kids getting harassed because they want to have a surf and I say 'are you kidding?' The beach should be for Aussie kids. But if you want to go to beaches and act tough in groups you better be able to back it up. If these fellas come out to Maroubra and start something they know it's going to be on, so they stay away."

Following the riots, in which the Bra Boys did not claim any involvement, Maroubra was the target of retaliation by Middle Eastern gangs. The Abberton brothers then held well-publicised meetings with other groups to help ease tensions. "I think that this is the start, the boys have agreed to come down and talk to us, to start some dialogue between the groups, you know, to try and ease some tension", said Sunny Abberton in a group interview on The 7.30 Report. Koby Abberton, his brothers, and other member of the Bra Boys were labeled as playing catalyst to the riots with Abberton singled out as the main culprit. Later, Abberton disputed the claims that he had attempted to fuel the riots, going on to tell The Sydney Morning Herald that he was "ashamed to be Australian that day" and had attempted, alongside his brothers and other Bra Boys to deflect and suppress the racially charged riots.

=== Bankruptcy and assault charges ===
Abberton was declared bankrupt in 2006, with debts in excess of A$1 million. These included debts of A$940,000 to the National Australia Bank, A$150,000 to the NSW Crime Commission, and A$50,000 in legal fees relating to his unsuccessful defence to charges of perverting the course of justice.

In 2008, Abberton plead guilty to assaulting an off-duty police officer in Honolulu. He was given a three-day custodial sentence.

== Other projects ==
=== The Mavis Abberton Foundation ===
The Mavis Abberton Foundation was set up by the Abberton brothers in an attempt to protect children of drug-dependent parents and children whose parents are in prison. The Foundation was named after the Abberton brothers' grandmother Mavis, who provided as their mother for most of their childhood while their own parents were incapable of providing a stable and guided environment. The Foundation attempts to suppress the prevalence of "lost children in broken-homes" and promotes a solace for those who may otherwise resort to drug dependency and criminal activity as a result of their environment.

In 2007, it was reported that there were plans for an exhibition cricket match to be played between members of the Bra Boys and the Compton Cricket Club (CCC), a disadvantaged cricket team made up of former gang members from south central Los Angeles, to help raise the profile of the Foundation during the CCC's inaugural tour to Australia.

=== MyBrothersKeeper clothing ===
Inspired by the friendship and brotherhood codes instilled by the Bra Boys, a clothing line to reflect the importance of solid bonds between friends and family entitled MyBrothersKeeper Clothing, sometimes referred to as MBK Clothing. Official members of the Bra Boys, including Abberton, have the "MyBrothersKeeper" slogan permanently tattooed on their bodies. Members of the Bra Boys and those who have purchased items from the clothing range are often referred to by the Bra Boys as MBK Soldiers.
