= Surf culture =

Culture associated with the sport of surfing

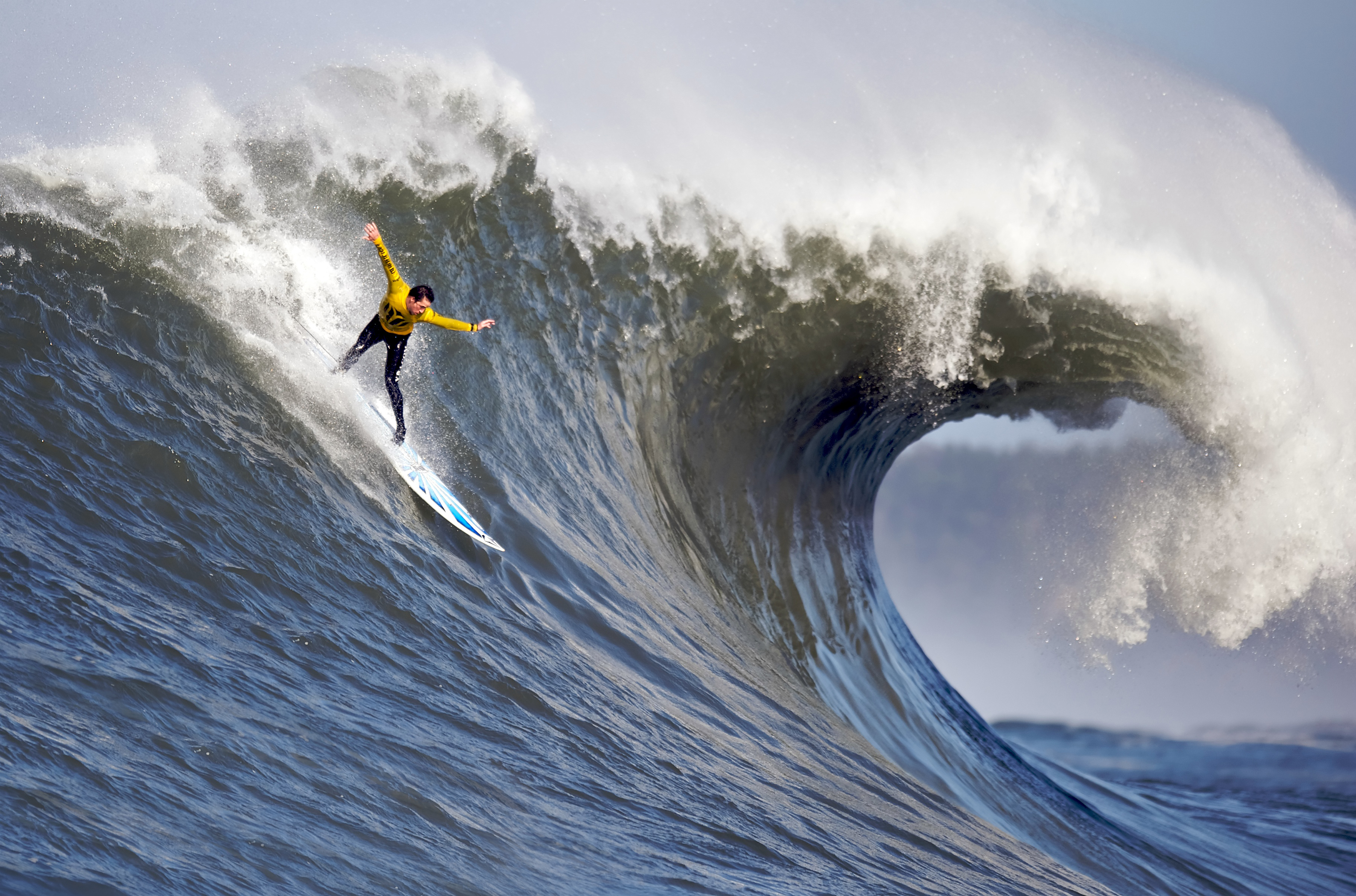
2010 Mavericks competition at Half Moon Bay, California

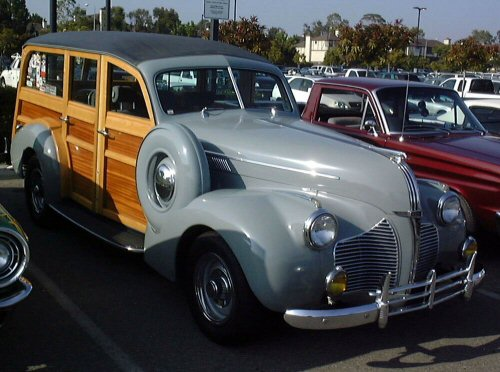
Pontiac woodie, used by early surfers

Surf culture includes the people, language, fashion, and lifestyle surrounding the sport of surfing. The history of surfing began with the ancient Polynesians. That initial culture directly influenced modern surfing, which began to flourish and evolve in the early 20th century, with its popularity peaking during the 1950s and 1960s (principally in Hawaii, Australia, and California). It has affected music, fashion, literature, film, art, and youth jargon in popular culture. The number of surfers throughout the world continues to increase as the culture spreads.

Surfers' desire for the best possible waves to ride with their surfboards make them dependent on conditions that may change rapidly, given the unpredictable nature of weather events and their effect on the surface of the ocean. Because surfing was limited by the geographical necessity of an ocean coastline with beaches, the culture of beach life often influenced surfers and vice versa. Surfer magazine was founded in the 1960s when surfing had gained popularity and was the initial voice for surf culture which included environmental activism. The staff used to say that if they were hard at work and someone yelled "Surf's up!" the office would suddenly empty. Localism or territorialism is a part of the development of surf culture in which individuals or groups of surfers claim certain key surfing spots as their own.

Aspects of 1960s surf culture in Southern California, where it was first popularized, include the woodie, bikinis and other beach wear, such as boardshorts or baggies, and surf music. Surfers developed the skateboard to be able to "surf" on land, as well as developing a number of other boardsports.

== History ==
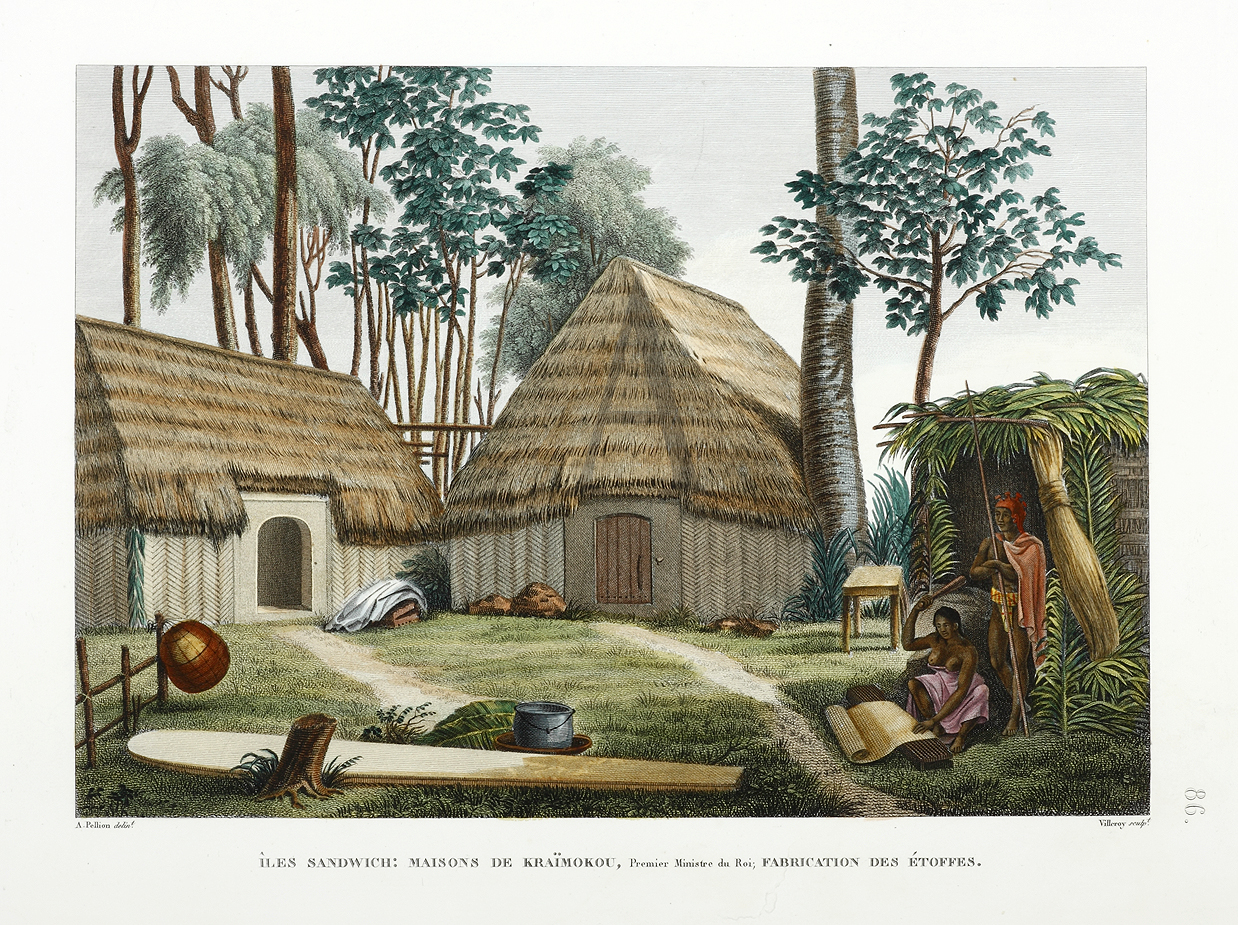
Alphonse Pellion, Sandwich Islands: houses of Kalanimoku, Prime Minister of the King; fabric making. In the foreground is an olo board, the largest of the Hawaiian wooden surfboards. (c. 1819)

The prevailing narrative of surfing (heʻe nalu; literally, wave sliding) history places its origins in the South Pacific, where the practice became ritualized over the course of centuries. The consensus among anthropologists and historians is that surfing was practiced throughout Polynesia and elsewhere in the Pacific in premodern times, and that surfing has been culturally significant in Hawaiʻi for at least 1,500 years.

Surfing culture in Hawaiʻi is very different now to what it was in 1778 when Captain James Cook ventured into the island realm. Hawaiian royalty had ruled the ocean domain for hundreds of years, although the islands were not unified until Kamehameha I established the Kingdom of Hawaiʻi in 1810. Traditional Hawaiian society was organized by a system of prohibitions called kapu (taboos) that determined all aspects of the islander's lives—political, social, and religious. It dictated everything from which foods to eat to the manner of making a surfboard. Consequently, society was divided into two social classes, the royal class and the commoner class. The best surfing spots were reserved for royalty, while commoners were relegated to locations with smaller, less well-formed breaks. The code of kapu assigned the proper length of boards to be used, according to the status of the rider. Commoners rode boards 12 to 14 feet long, while royalty rode boards 16 to 24 feet long.

Although white (haole) historiography has emphasized the demise of surf culture in Hawaiʻi that began with the arrival in 1820 of American missionaries, who disapproved of the customary nudity, gambling, and casual sexuality associated with surfing, Native Hawaiian scholars are reassessing their own history and assert that contrary to the prevailing narrative, Native Hawaiians have exercised agency and resisted colonial encroachment in the realm of the po ʻina nalu (surf zone).

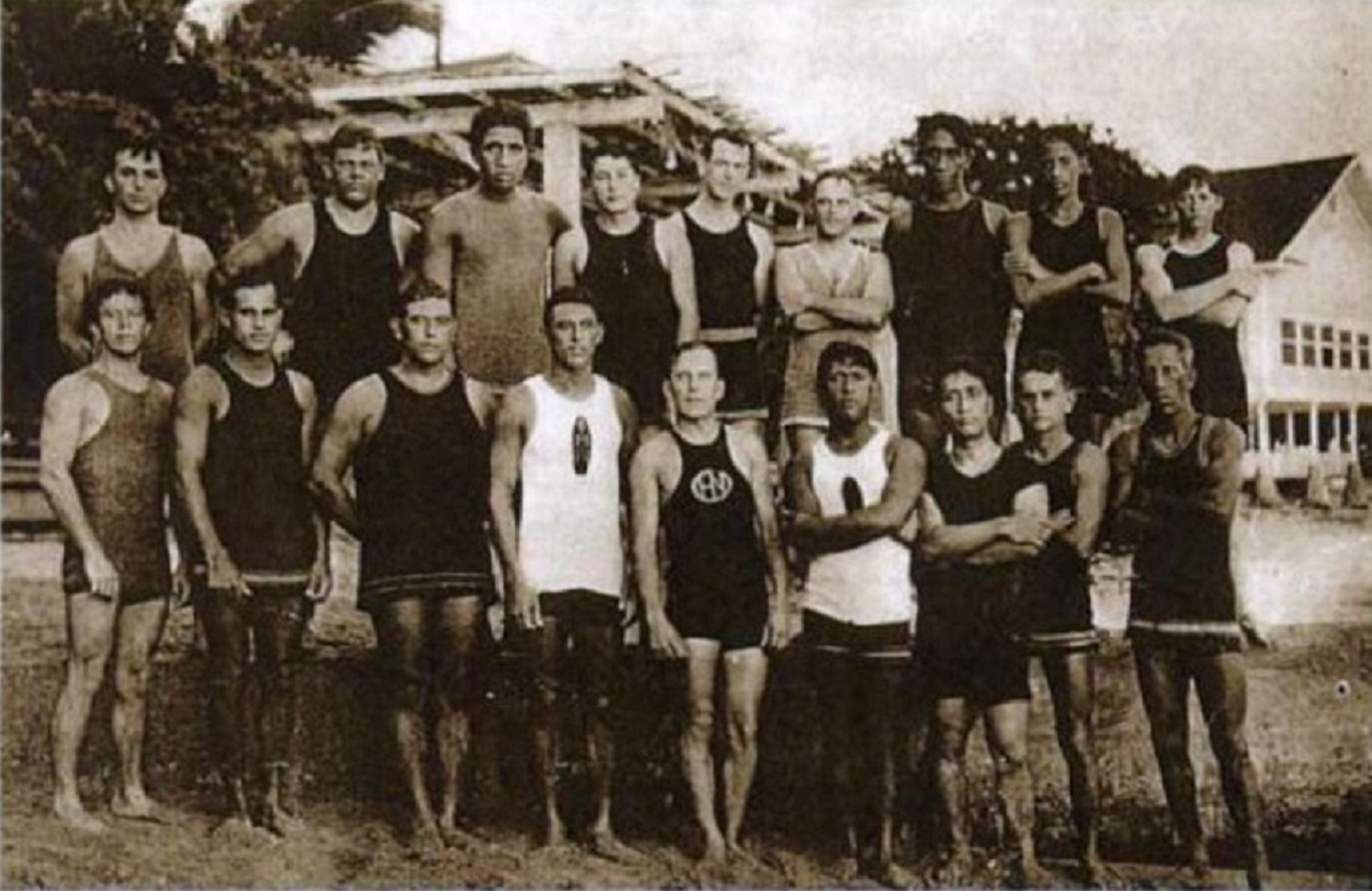
Duke Kahanamoku and the Hui Nalu Club

In the early 1900s, Alexander Hume Ford and Jack London actively tried to marginalize Native Hawaiians in their own cultural sphere and exploit surfing as a means to attract tourists. Although George Freeth and other Hawaiians had taught Ford and London how to surf, they went on to found the segregated Outrigger Canoe Club (chartered in 1911), and proclaimed it "an organization for the haole". In response, Freeth and Duke Kahanamoku started the multiracial Hui Nalu Club (Club of Waves) at Waikīkī Beach to assert control of their status in the surf zone and preserve the ocean as a Hawaiian realm, defending it from the Western colonization that had taken their land.

The worldwide diffusion of surfing from Hawaiʻi also began in the early 20th century, when Freeth and Kahanamoku gave demonstrations in the United States, Australia, and New Zealand. Freeth and Kahanamoku were the original ambassadors of surfing; Freeth moved to southern California in 1907, where he demonstrated the sport at many beaches, including Venice and Redondo. Beginning in the 1960s, surfing was spread further by devoted surfers, mostly from California and Australia, searching for new wave breaks in far-flung places.

== Spirituality ==
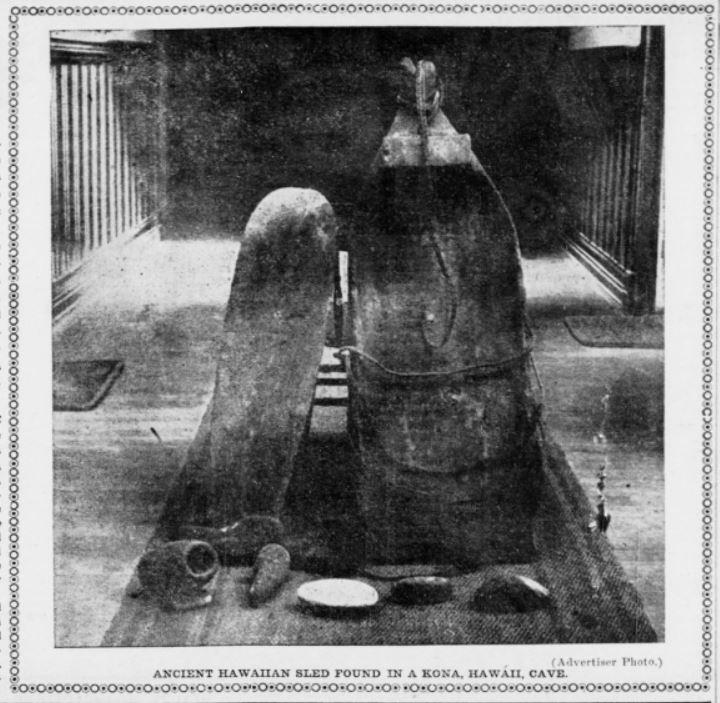
Ancient surfboard and hill sled dating to the 1600s discovered in Chiefess Kaneamuna's burial cave

Surfing was of profound religious importance to the ancient Hawaiians. The study of waves was called ka nalu and the memory of notable surfing feats was preserved in chants and songs (meles) passed down since the 15th century. Many chiefs had a personal surf chant that celebrated their surfing prowess; this could be performed only by a professional chanter, one of which every chief maintained in his retinue. Despite claims by some historians that surfing was reserved strictly for the aliʻi or Hawaiian hereditary rulers, Hawaiians of all classes and sexes, young or old, practiced the art.

After King Kamehameha's death in 1819, his son, crown prince Liholiho (Kamehameha II), abolished the kapu system that regulated the islanders' lives at the urging of Kamehameha's favorite wife, Kaʻahumanu, who had declared herself regent (Kuhina Nui). As a consequence of this action, temples and the resident images of the gods were destroyed; although many idols were hidden away when the kapu was broken, they were later sought out and burned, often at the instigation of Congregationalist American missionaries. Liholiho's cousin Kekuaokalani had been charged by his uncle Kamehameha I with responsibility for defending the gods, their temples, and their worship. Kekuaokalani challenged the overthrow of the old order, and assumed leadership of the priests, courtiers, and territorial chiefs who opposed the abolition of the kapu. He met Liholiho on the field of battle at Kuamo'o on the island of Hawaiʻi, where the king's forces, led by Kalanimoku, defeated the last upholders of the ancient religion. Belief in the power of the gods was undermined when those who opposed them suffered no divine punishment.

Since ancient times among the Native Hawaiians, the appointed kahuna (priest) laid an offering of fish, said prayers, and performed other religious rites by a tree before it was felled to make a surfboard. The ancient Hawaiians believed that the trees they made their surfboards (papa heʻe nalu) from had souls (ʻuhane), and used the trunks of koa trees to build them. Their pae poʻo (bodyboards) (Note: According to John R. Kukeakalani Clark, the word pae po`o, meaning to "ride [a wave] head-first", was coined by Hawaiian surfers in Waikiki around 1900 in reference to bodysurfing or surfing with a small wooden bodyboard. The word was often shortened to pae po. The spelling used today, paipo, was coined by Hawaiian surfer Wally Froiseth.) as well as kikoʻo and alaia surfboards were made from koa; however, olo, the longest and heaviest surfboards, were made from the lighter and more buoyant wood of the wiliwili, and were used exclusively by the nobility.

Heiaus are Hawaiian places of worship where sacrifices were offered, they include actual temples as well as natural objects or features of the landscape. Every activity in Hawaiian culture was associated with a cult devoted to a deity or the activity itself, such as surfing. When the ocean was calm and there were no waves to surf, the kahuna lashed the surface of the sea with long strands of beach morning glory (pohuehue) vines and chanted, in unison with the surfers:

Hawaiian	English
Ku mai! Ku mai! Ka nalu nui mai Kahiki mai, Alo po ʻi pu! Ku mai ka pohuehue, Hu! Kai koʻo loa.	Arise, arise you great surfs from Kahiki, The powerful, curling waves, arise with the pohuehue, Well up, long raging surf.

The chant itself was called pohuehue, after the morning glory vines.

At Kahaluʻu Bay on the Kona coast there stands a fairly well-preserved surfing heiau called Kuʻemanu Heiau, a large structure built of black lava rock. Here the local ancient Hawaiians prayed for good surf.

Many surfers today combine their love of the sport with their own religious or spiritual beliefs. In Huntington Beach, California for example, a local Christian non-denominational church occasionally meets on the beach for Sunday early-morning services. After the closing prayer, the minister and congregation paddle out for a morning session.

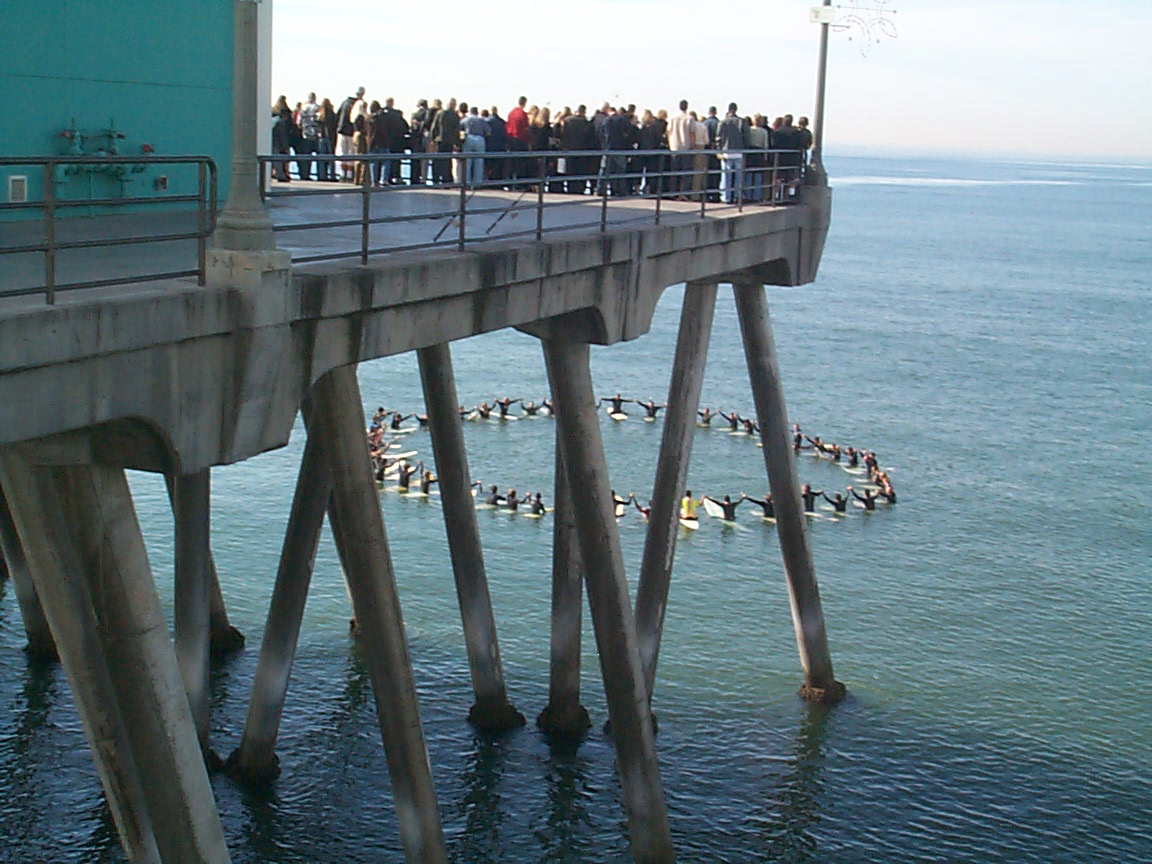
A surfer memorial service at the Huntington Beach Pier

Various surfing communities organize and take part in "paddle outs", i.e., memorial services for fallen surfers, sometimes on the anniversary of passing such as the Eddie Aikau memorial service held annually at Waimea Bay, Hawaii. Participants in the memorial service paddle out to a suitable location with flower leis around their necks or with loose flowers (sometimes held between their teeth). The participants then get into a circular formation, hold hands, and silently pray. Sometimes they will raise their clasped hands skyward before tossing their flowers or leis into the center of the ring. Afterward, they paddle back toward the beach to begin their surf session. Often these services take place at sunrise or sunset. In locations with a pier, such as Huntington Beach, Orange County, California, the service can take place near the end of the pier so that any non-surfers, such as elderly relatives, can watch and participate. Often the participants on the pier will throw down bouquets of flowers into the center of the ring.

== Women in surfing ==
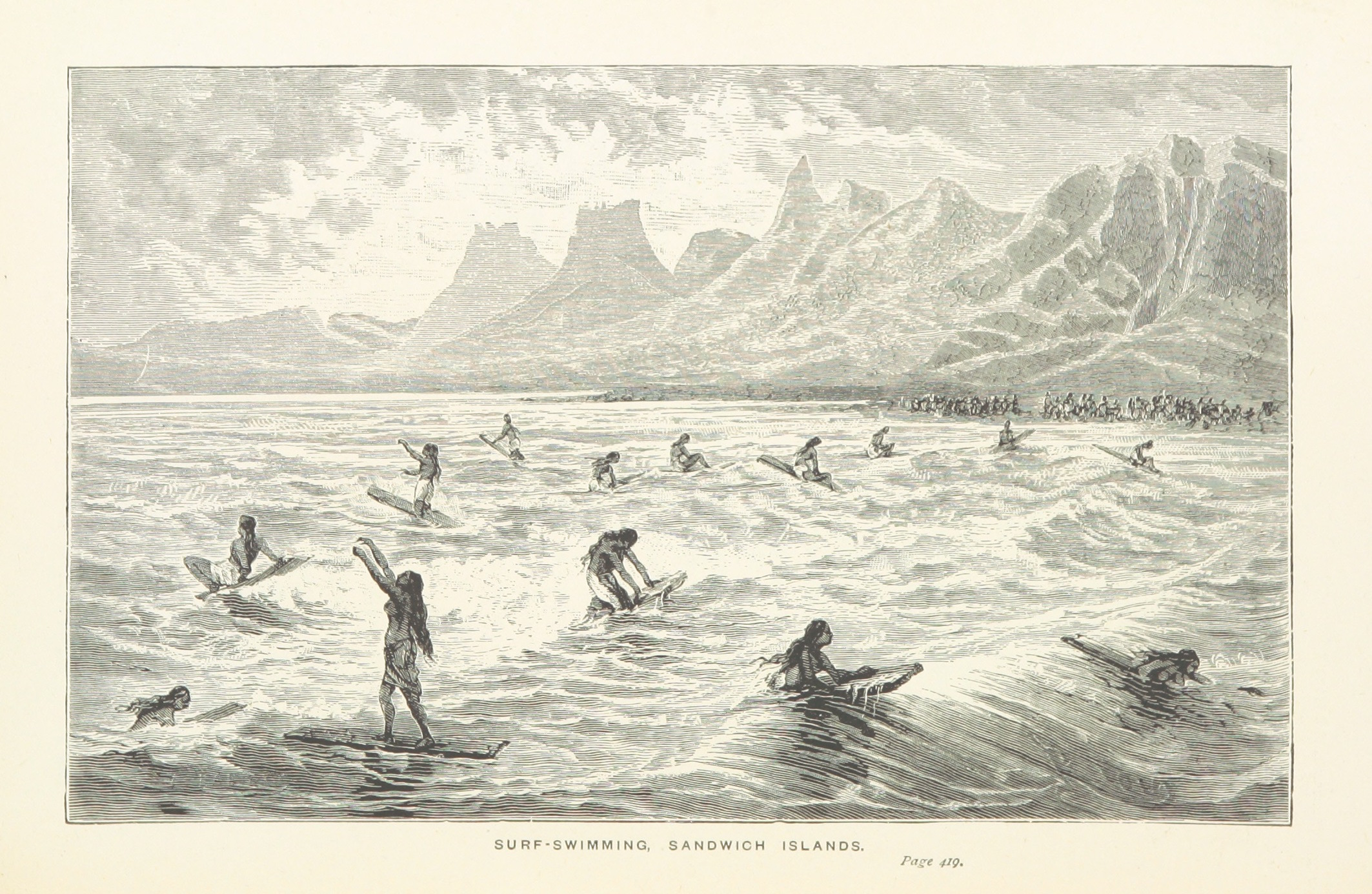
Engraving of wahine surfing after a drawing by Charles de Varigny (1829)

Like men, women surfed in ancient Polynesia. This was especially documented in the waters around Hawaii, where children, women, and men surfed. Queen Kaʻahumanu, the most powerful wife of Kamehameha, favored a surf break known today as Castles, an outer reef at Waikiki on the south shore of Oʻahu that was forbidden (kapu) to everyone except royalty (aliʻi). Standing 6 feet tall and weighing over three hundred pounds, Ka'ahumanu had the physical strength and the skill to paddle an olo board and catch the large waves that break at Castles on a south swell and ride them. Until the 1830s women were still actively engaged in Hawaiian surfing, but this changed after American missionaries had come to the islands and taught the Hawaiians that it was improper for women to surf. Women did not begin surfing around the Hawaiian islands again until the late 1800s. By the end of World War II surfing would have a major revival that increased its popularity and participating membership. Women were encouraged to take up surfing by early water sports innovators Duke Kahanamoku and Tom Blake. Blake suggested that surfing would help women to keep their feminine figures.

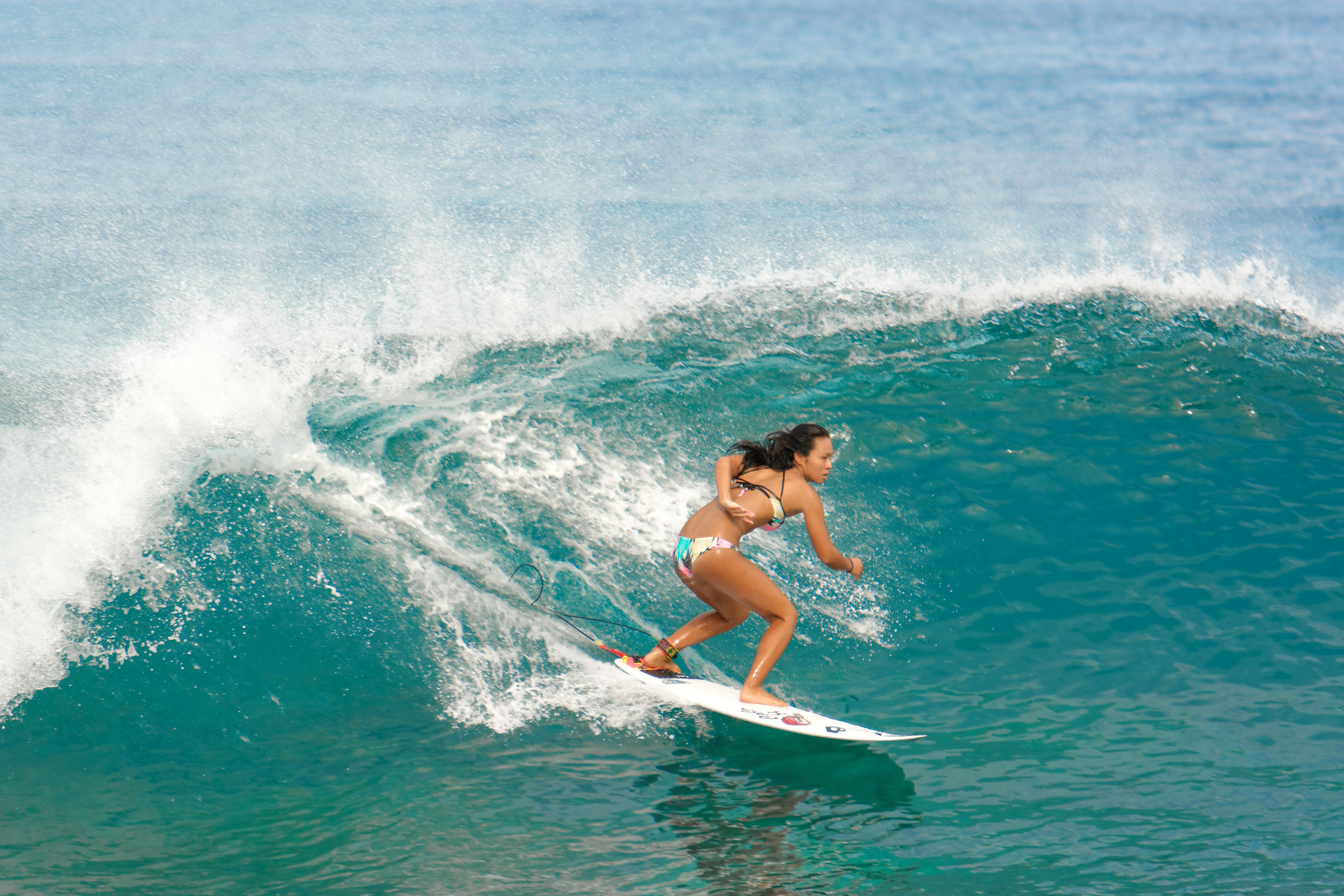
Hawaiian surfer on the North Shore near Sunset Beach (Paumalū)

There would be another rise in the popularity of women's surfing just a decade later as women increasingly played roles in surfing films. Examples of this were the Gidget movie trilogy and TV series based on the book of the same title. In spite of this new popularity, the underlying theme of these works was that women should be viewers of surfing rather than participants in it.

Due to the negative reactions women received because of their involvement in surfing, being labeled as 'masculine' or 'tomboys', women began to take ownership of their participation. This is seen in their working together to organize surfing competitions for women. There had been competitions for women held in the 1950s and 1960s but these were amateur events. The 1970s and 1980s saw a shift in this state of affairs as women entered into the world of professional surf competitions. This caused a positive change in the style with which women surfed at the time by focusing more on their power and speed as athletes rather than being aesthetically pleasing to the viewer. Today, professional female surfers continue to have a difficult time being recognized as athletes, and must deal with continued objectification and sexualization by the surf media.

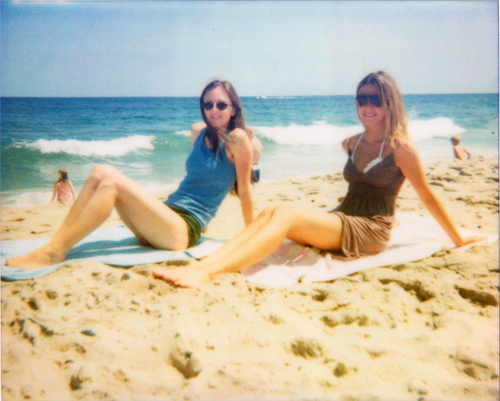
Beach bunnies

Professional female surfers have also noted that they face pay inequality when compared to their male counterparts—women do not win prize monies equal to those won by men in contests. These women have also indicated that the issue of pay equality arises when it comes to corporate sponsorships by surf brands. Brands prioritize hiring women surfers who appear more conventionally attractive rather than those more talented.

There is currently a push from some surfing groups to include women of color more prominently in the overall culture of surfing. One of these organizations is "Textured Waves", a surfing collective dedicated to women of color. Their goal is to improve the accessibility of the sport and the acceptance of individuals who do not necessarily fit the "traditional" image of what a surfer looks like.

=== Beach bunnies ===
A beach bunny is a general North American popular culture term for a young woman who spends her free time at the beach. In surf culture it may also refer to a female surfer. Beach bunnies are known for the amount of time they spend sun tanning and are usually represented wearing bikinis. Examples in film and television include Beach Party and Gidget. The male equivalent is beach bum.

== Diversity ==
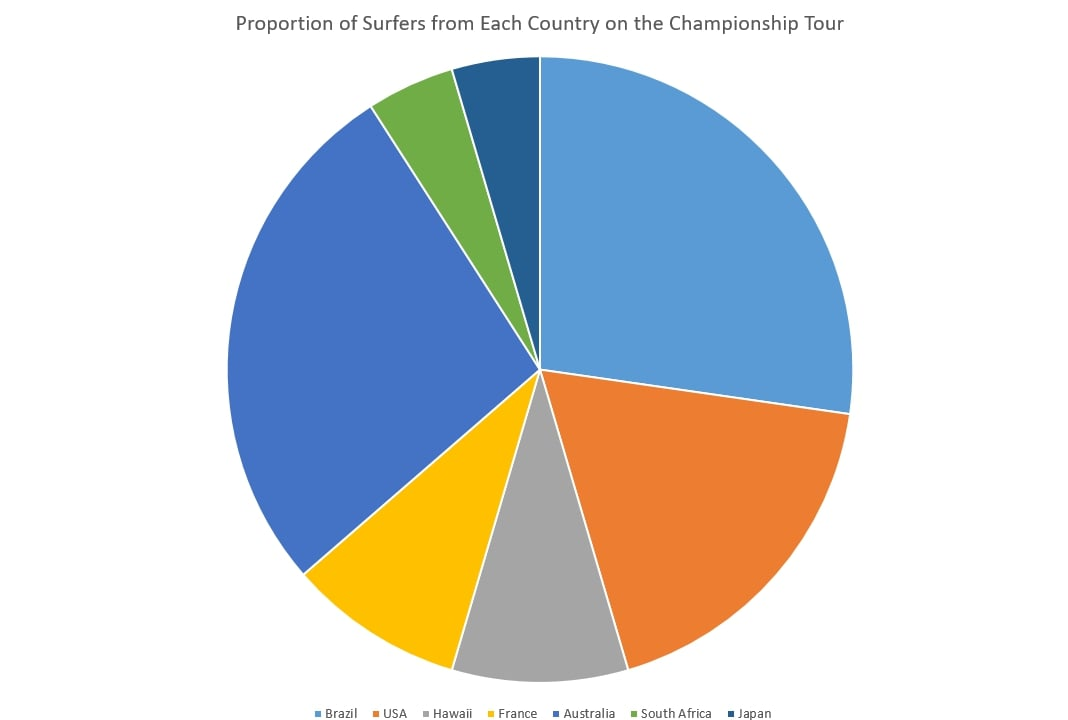
A pie graph showing the proportion of surfers' country of origin in the World Surf League Men's Championship Tour

In recent years, diversity in surfing has come to the fore as a new issue for the surfing community to handle. With the professional surfing world being led by Brazilian surfers like Italo Ferreira and Gabriel Medina, and the presence of athletes such as Michael February (the first black African surfer on the Championship Tour), surfing's professional realm may seem to be moving in the direction of inclusiveness. However, the same is not necessarily true for the world's casual surfers in places like the United States. Organizations such as City Surf Project in San Francisco are dedicated to bringing the sport of surfing to underserved youth of black and Latino backgrounds. Jeff Williams, who is the co-president of the Los Angeles Black Surfer's Collective (a similar organization to CSP), summarized the need for these programs by stating that "anytime you try to talk about diversity in surfing, it all boils down to access", meaning that the financial and cultural hurdles of getting in the water are what keep some individuals from minority communities from being able to participate in the sport.

Meanwhile, the surfing world is witnessing surf culture in places that most surfers have been unaware of up to this point. One example of this come's from Selema Masekela's new book project, AfroSurf, which details the prevalence of surfing and surf culture in Africa. South African surfing has long been a significant part of global surf culture, but surfing in the rest of Africa has been primarily seen as a tourist attraction, rather than a local culture, until now; "these places are adopting surfing as their own and then injecting their culture into it," according to Masekela.

A social media site called GaySurfers.net was created in 2010 to encourage LGBTQ acceptance and diversity in the surfing community and help LGBTQ people connect with each other.

== Big wave culture ==
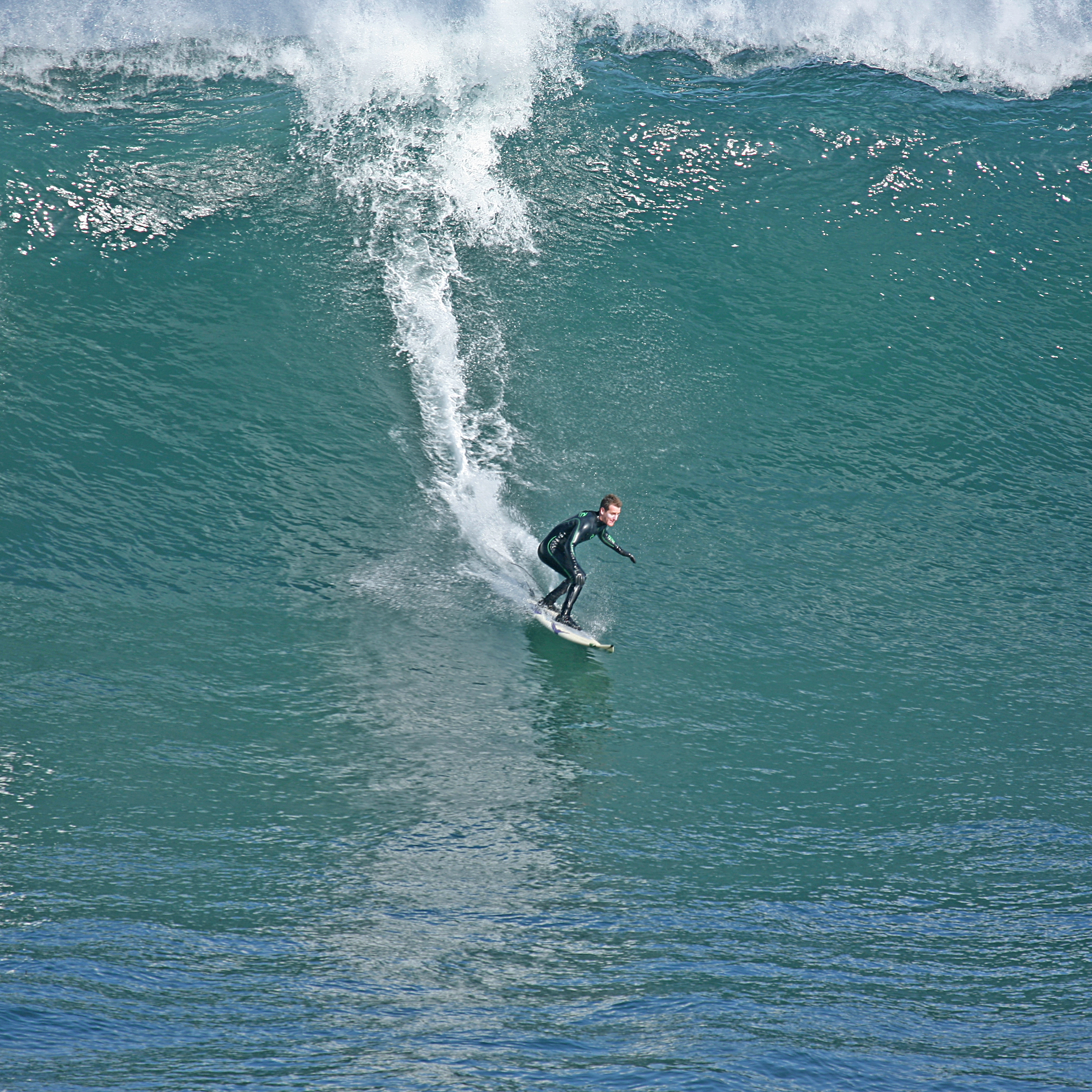
Surf in southern California 2008

The non-competitive adventure activity of riding the biggest waves possible (known as "rhino hunting") is popular with some surfers. A practice popularized in the 1990s has seen big wave surfing revolutionized, as surfers use personal watercraft to tow them out to a position where they can catch waves previously unrideable because of the speed at which they travel (see tow-in surfing). Some waves reach speeds of over 60 km/h; personal watercraft enable surfers to catch up to the speed of the wave, thereby making them rideable. Personal watercraft also allow surfers to survive wipeouts. In many instances surfers would not otherwise survive the battering of the "sets" (groups of waves together). This spectacular activity is extremely popular with television crews, but because such waves rarely occur in heavily populated regions, and usually only a very long way out to sea on outer reefs, few spectators see such events directly.

Though surfers come from all walks of life, the beach bum / surf bum stereotype comes from the exuberant enthusiasm for their sport that surfers often demonstrate. Dedication and perfectionism are also qualities that surfers may bring to what some observers have traditionally regarded as a commitment to a lifestyle as well as a sport.

For specific surf spots, the state of the ocean tide can play a significant role in the quality of waves or hazards of surfing there. Tidal variations vary greatly among the various global surfing regions, and the effect the tide has on specific areas can vary greatly among the individual spots within a given area. Locations such as Bali, Panama, and Ireland experience 2-3 meter tide fluctuations, whereas in Hawaii the difference between high and low tide is typically less than one meter.

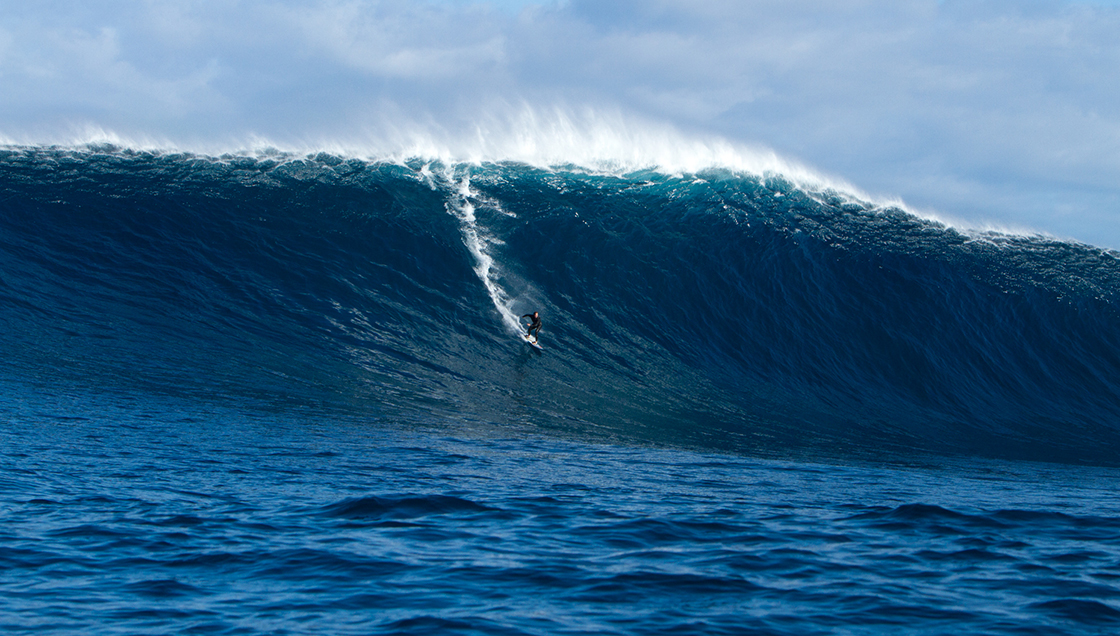
Mick Corbett at Cow Bombie in 2014

Each surf break is different, since the underwater topography of one place is unlike any other. At beach breaks, the sandbanks can change shape from week to week, so it takes commitment to get good waves.

The saying "You should have been here yesterday" became a commonly used phrase to refer to bad conditions. Nowadays, however, surf forecasting is aided by advances in information technology, whereby mathematical modeling graphically depicts the size and direction of swells moving around the globe.

The quest for perfect surf has given rise to a field of tourism based on the surfing adventure. Yacht charters and surf camps offer surfers access to the high quality surf found in remote, tropical locations, where tradewinds ensure offshore conditions.

Along with the rarity of what surfers consider truly perfect surf conditions (due to changing weather and surf condition) and the inevitable hunt for great waves, surfers often become dedicated to their sport in a way that precludes a more traditional life. Surfing, instead, becomes their lifestyle.

The goals of those who practice the sport vary, but throughout its history, many have seen surfing as more than a sport, as an opportunity to harness the waves and to relax and forget about their daily routines. Surfers have veered from even this beaten path, and foregone the traditional goals of first world culture in the hunt for a continual 'stoke', harmony with life, their surfing, and the ocean. These "soul surfers" are a vibrant and long-standing sub-group. Competitive surf culture, centered around surf contests and endorsement deals, and localism's disturbance of the peace, are often seen in opposition to this.

== Localism ==
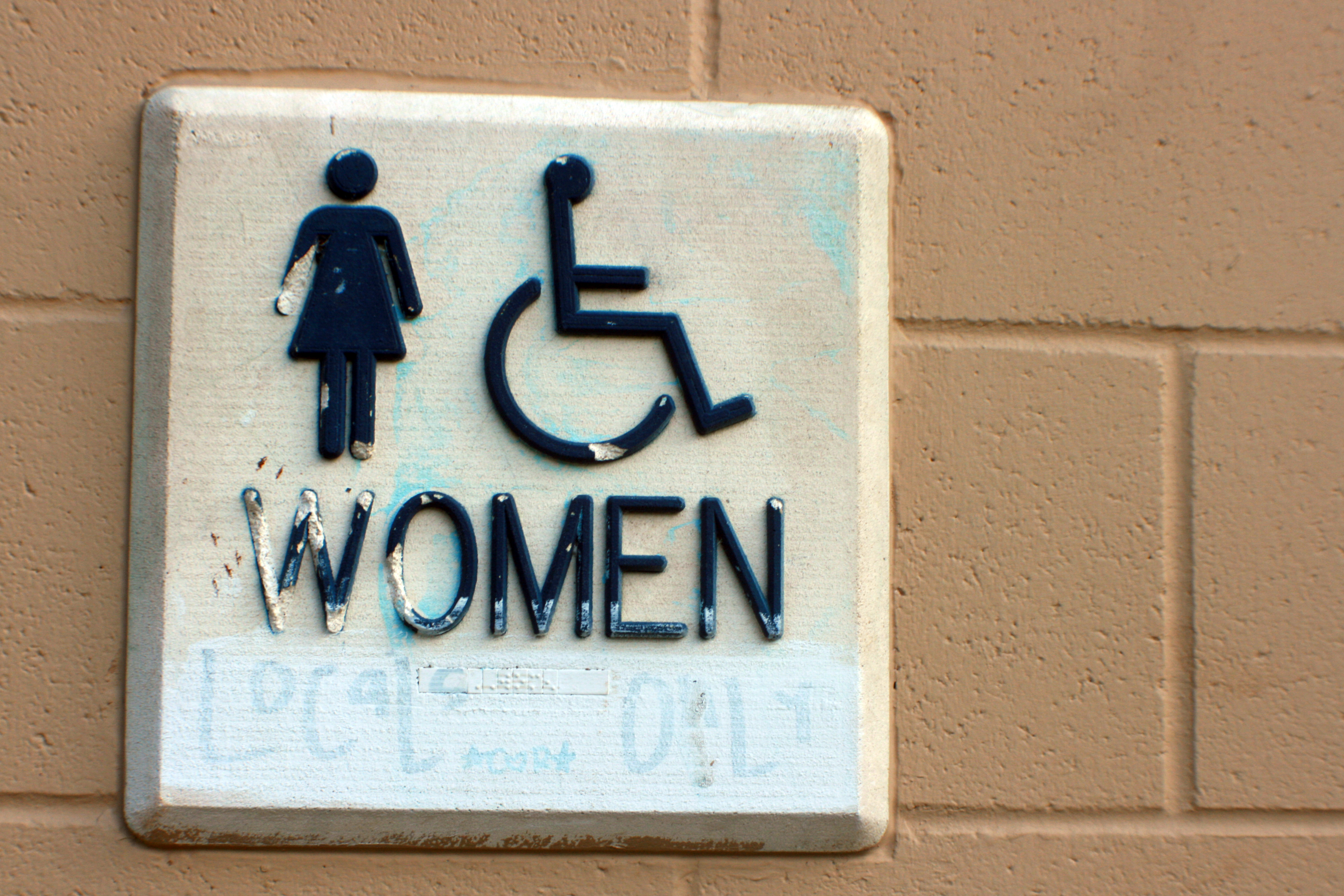
Locals only

Even though waves break everywhere along a coast, good surf spots are rare. A surf break that forms great surfable waves may easily become a coveted commodity, especially if the wave breaks there only rarely. If this break is near a large population center with many surfers, territorialism often arises. Regular surfers who live around a desirable surf break may often guard it jealously, hence the expression "locals only". The expression is common in beach towns, especially those that attract seasonal vacationers who live outside the area. Localism is expressed when surfers are involved in verbal or physical threats or abuse to deter people from surfing at certain spots. It is based in part on the belief that fewer people mean more waves per surfer. In 2019, The New York Times claimed the concept of localism was originally pioneered by surfer Miki Dora.

Localism often exists due to socioeconomic factors as well. Until relatively recently, surfers were looked down upon as lazy people on the fringe of society (hence the term "beach bum"). Many who surfed were locals who lived in a beach town year-round and were from a lower economic class. For that reason, these groups were resentful of outsiders, particularly those who were well-to-do and came to their beaches to surf recreationally rather than as a way of life. Australia has its own history of surfers being openly treated with hostility from local governments in the sport's early days, and the tension never truly vanished, despite the sport's enormous increase in popularity. Maroubra Beach in Australia became infamous for localism and other violence chronicled in the documentary film Bra Boys about the eponymous group, although the surfers in the film maintain they are not a "gang".

=== Surf Nazi ===
Some locals have been known to form loose gangs that surf in a certain break or beach and fiercely protect their "territory" from outsiders. These surfers are often referred to as "surf punks" or "surf Nazis". The local surfer gangs in Southern California (Malibu Locals Only and Lunada Bay Boys) and those on the North Shore of O'ahu (Da Hui) have been known to threaten visitors with physical violence for invading their territory.

In Southern California, local surfers are especially hostile to the surfers from the San Fernando Valley whom they dub "vallies" or "valley kooks". The expression "surf Nazi" arose in the 1960s to describe territorial, aggressive, and obsessive surfers, often involved in surf gangs or surf clubs. Surfer Miki Dora would be known for spray painting swastikas on his surf board. The term "surf Nazi" was originally used simply to denote "a zealous, devoted surfer". However, some surfers actually embraced Nazi symbolism or Nazism. Some surf clubs in the 1960s, particularly at Windansea in La Jolla, embraced the term by performing Nazi salutes, wearing swastikas and Stahlhelm helmets, and painting swastikas on their surfboards and on the Windansea pump house.

American artist Ed Roth sold plastic Nazi stormtrooper helmets to surfers in the 1960s, and told Time magazine, "That Hitler really did a helluva public relations job for me." Surfer Miki Dora would be known for spray painting swastikas on his surf board, while Matt Warshaw later stated, "We'd paint a swastika on something for no other reason than to piss people off. Which it did. So next time we'd paint two swastikas, just to piss 'em off more." The "locals only" attitude and protectionism of the Santa Monica surf spots in the early 1970s was depicted in the movie Lords of Dogtown, which was based on the documentary Dogtown and Z-Boys. The New Yorker stated the term surf Nazi became commonplace in the 1970s and 1980s.

In 1987, filmmaker Peter George would direct an exploitation action film based on the term "surf Nazis" entitled Surf Nazis Must Die.

=== Surf gangs ===
Surf gangs often form to preserve cultural identity through the protection of beach towns and shorelines. If known territory is trespassed by members of another surf gang, violence may occur. Long Beach is home to one of the oldest and biggest surf gangs, called "Longos". Many surf gangs have been known to claim land territory and specific surfing waves as territory. Surf gangs have gained notoriety over the years, especially with the production of Bra Boys.

The Lunada Bay Boys (in Palos Verdes Estates, California) became the subject of a class action lawsuit in 2016.

==== Wolfpak ====
The Wolfpak was originally composed of a few surfers from Kauaʻi, Hawaii who believed in respecting surf localism. Kauaʻi, according to a Wolfpak member, is a place where one is raised to honor the value of respect. This value is what led to the group's effort to manage the chaos associated with North Shore surfing. Some notable members have been pro surfers Andy Irons and Bruce Irons, as well as the reality show 808 star and Blue Crush actor, Kala Alexander.

Wolfpak began in 2001 when leader Kala Alexander moved to the North Shore in search of job opportunities, and found disorganization and lack of respect in the surf lineup at the surf reef break, Pipeline. Alexander found it necessary to dictate who would surf Pipeline to both preserve the value, and also protect surfers from the reef's potentially life-threatening waves.

The waves at Pipeline can reach over 6 meters and its powerful disposition has taken the lives of professional surfers. If a visiting surfer collided with another surfer, this could result in serious harm or death. These observations led to the Wolfpak's proactive enforcement on the North Shore.

The Wolfpak's territorial enforcement has drawn attention because of its violent means. In an incident where a tourist cut off a friend of Alexander's in a typical 2 metres (6.6 ft) swell, the Wolfpak leader assaulted the tourist. Comments from anonymous locals show that the presence of Wolfpak is well perceived, if not intimidating. Some locals who hold similar values of cultural respect support what the members are trying to do.

Alexander does not view Wolfpak as a gang, but says they look out for every local Hawaiian. They attempt to preserve their way of life and realize the implications that a lack of respect can have on Hawaiian culture.

==== Bra Boys ====
The Bra Boys are a popular surf gang founded in Maroubra, a beachside suburb in the Eastern Suburbs of Sydney, Australia. They gained international fame and attention in 2007 with the release of Bra Boys: Blood Is Thicker than Water, a documentary about the bonds and struggles of the many gang members. The "Bra Boys" name originates both from the slang word for brother, and as a reference to the gang's home suburb, Maroubra. Gang members tattoo "My Brothers Keeper" [sic] across the front of their chests and the Maroubra area code across their back.

Many of the Bra Boys came from impoverished homes and families torn apart by drug use. Brothers Sunny, Jai, Koby and Dakota Abberton came from an especially difficult upbringing. To them the Bra Boys were much more than a gang, they were a group of friends, and a family of their own that loved to surf and always stood up for one another. The documentary, written and directed by the gang members themselves, showed the raw gritty side of a surf life previously glamorized by Hollywood.

== Surf terminology ==
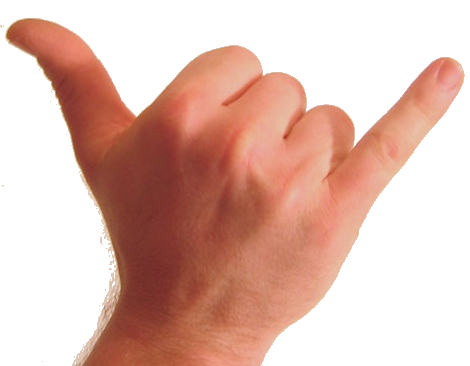
The Shaka greeting sign

Surfing (particularly in Southern California) has its own sociolect, which has comingled with Valleyspeak and Australia (Uptalking). Words such as "grom", "dude", "tubular", "radical", and "gnarly" are associated with both. Northern California created its own surf terms as well that include "groovy", "hella", and "tight". One of the primary terms used by surfers around the world is the word "stoked". This refers to a feeling of enthusiasm or exhilaration towards the waves breaking, or as John Engle wrote, "This is, of course, what surfers themselves have long labeled the stoke, in its most heightened form the plenitude when time stands still and intense physical presentness means out of body otherness." Another widely used term for surfers is "YEW!", which is an indicator that a large wave has been spotted, however mostly shouted while a surfer is catching or has recently finished riding a wave. Surfers have often been associated with being slackers or 'beach bums' (with women being known as 'beach bunnies').

The shaka sign, credited to Hamana Kalili of Laie, Hawaii, is a common greeting in surfer culture.

== Issues affecting surfers ==
Environmental damage and increasing development may continue to increase pressure on the sport. Oil spills and toxic algae growth can also threaten surfing regions.

Some of these stresses may be overcome by building of artificial reefs for surfing. Several have been built in recent years (one is at Cables in Western Australia), and there is widespread enthusiasm in the global surfing community for additional projects. However, environmental opposition and rigorous coastal permitting regulations is dampening prospects for building such reefs in some countries, such as the United States.

== Surfing and environmentalism ==
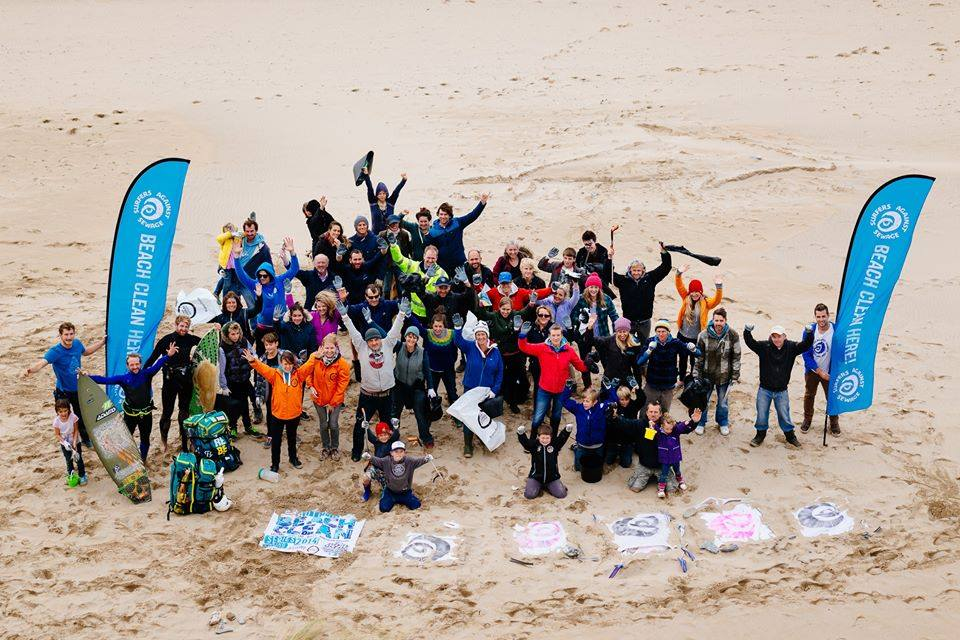
Surfers Against Sewage at a beach cleanup in Perranporth

Surfing, as a sport, is heavily dependent on a healthy environment. As a result, interest groups have blossomed to influence the utilization of coastal properties relevant to surfing. There is conflict between surfers and other user groups over the allocation of coastal resources. Common to most disputes are two issues, disposal of sewage and toxic waste into near shore waters and the formation of harbors, breakwaters and jetties. Sewage and toxic waste almost always affects mammals in a negative way. Coastal construction and engineering projects can have either good or bad effects on surf breaks. While some sources suspect the effectiveness of surfing environmentalist groups, notable victories have been achieved by surfers championing their issues. Some examples of these victories include:

- In 1991 the Surfrider Foundation and the EPA won, at the time, the second largest Clean Water Act lawsuit in history. A $5.4 million lawsuit against two paper mills, Louisiana-Pacific Corporation and the Simpson Paper Company resulted in the creation of the Humboldt Area Recreation Enhancement and Water Quality Fund and $50 million was spent by the mills to reduce ocean discharges at their facilities near Eureka, California.
- In 2008 the U.S. Department of Commerce upheld a California Coastal Commission decision to deny the $1.3 Billion extension of California State Highway 241 that would have impacted the popular and world-renowned surf site Trestles near San Clemente, California. This decision was a victory for surf environmentalists who led a grassroots campaign to "Save Trestles, Stop the Toll Road." At the time federal officials received 35,000 written statements on the issue, most in support of upholding the decision of the CCC.
- A global example can be found in the case of the newly formed World Surfing Reserve at Ericeira, Portugal that was dedicated in October 2011 and endorsed by Portuguese President Aníbal Cavaco Silva. President Silva "acknowledged the significance of preserving the surfing coastline ... for the vitality of Portugal's economy, the health of the coastal and marine environment, and maintaining a high quality of life for the residents." The preservation of this pristine surf spot was accomplished by the Save the Waves Coalition and its World Surfing Reserves program whose goal is to, "proactively identifies, designates and preserves outstanding waves, surf zones and their surrounding environments, around the world...."

== Surf tourism ==
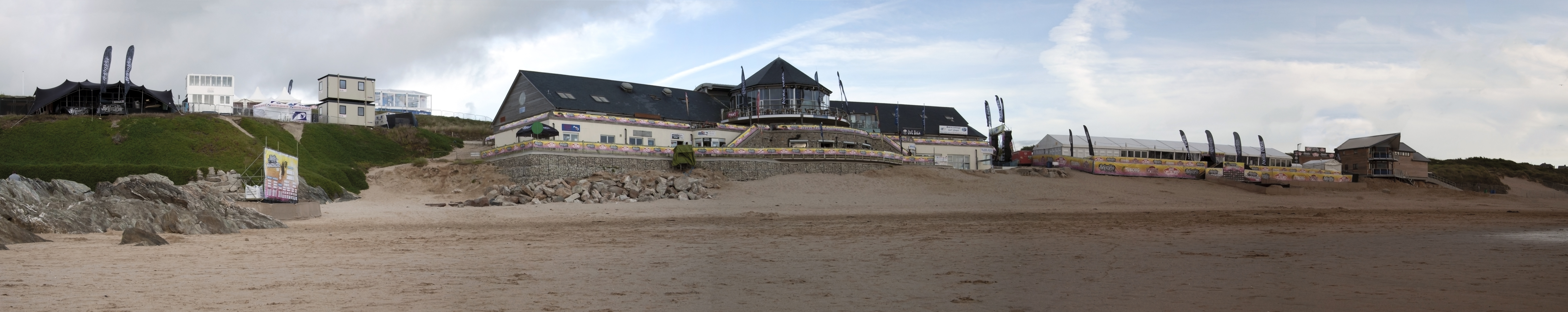
Fistral Beach showing the beach bar setup ready for the 2010 Boardmasters Festival

The surf industry is a billion dollar industry whose popularity as a recreational sport has gained momentum in many coastal areas around the world over the past decades. With the publicizing of new surf destinations through television, movies, magazines, and the Internet, and other media, as well as greater access to traveling accommodations, surf tourism has created large impacts on local communities and environments in developing countries as well as in established areas around the world. Tourism is not always the main reason for fast expansion in developing countries, but under those circumstances groups of activists and non-profits such as Surfrider Foundation, SurfAid, IJourneyGreen, Surf Resource Network, World Tourism Organization, NEF, and UNESCO have begun working with locals and their governments to minimize the negative impacts of tourism upon host communities' environments and maximize and equitably distribute the positive impacts of tourism. Some of the negative impacts of tourism relevant to surf dominant communities are:

- Failure to create adequate levels of employment and income
- Loss of local skills and failure to provide skilled jobs for local population
- Labor exploitation
- Inequitable distribution of the costs and benefits of tourism
- Fast, unstable development of infrastructure which can cause beach erosion and safety and health problems
- Improper waste disposal and (ocean) pollution
- Lack of political will to pursue sustainable tourism
- Lack of resources both human and economic
- Central and local government corruption
- Short-term focus undermining long-term goals for development

Some of the positive impacts of tourism relevant to surf dominant communities include:

- The extent of linkages to the domestic economy
- The creation of employment
- Fostering of genuine appropriate technology transfer
- Generation of jobs for skilled labor as well as local managers, technicians, and personnel
- Equitable social, sectorial and regional distribution of costs and benefits
- Coordination of government policies and programs for locals and foreign visitors
- Infrastructure and incentives

== Surfing art ==
=== Surf visual art ===
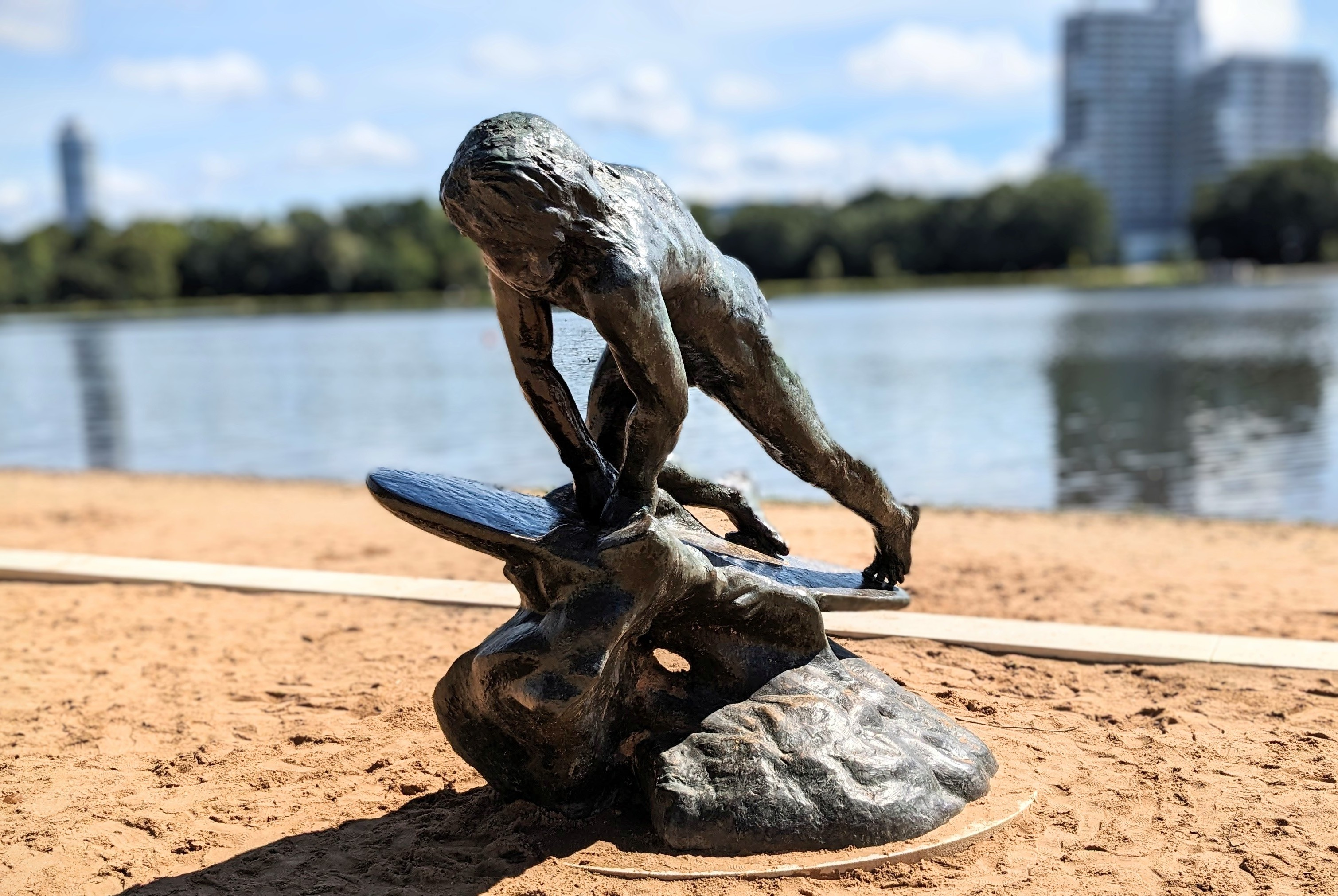
Bronze sculpture, Surfer (1978), designed by German artist Waldemar Grzimek, cast by Hermann Noack

Artists such as Damian Fulton, Rick Reitveld and Phil Roberts have depicted surfers and surfing lifestyles in their paintings and in murals. Artist Mark Patterson created a mosaic, Surfing Madonna, in Encinitas that portrays the Virgen de Guadalupe riding a surfboard.

=== Surf graphics ===
"Surf graphics" is the art style associated with the surfing subculture in posters, flyers, T-shirts and logos. It is heavily influenced by skate art, Kustom Kulture and tiki culture. Popular artists in the genre include Drew Brophy, Damian Fulton, Rick Griffin, Bill Ogden and Jim Phillips.

=== Surf music ===
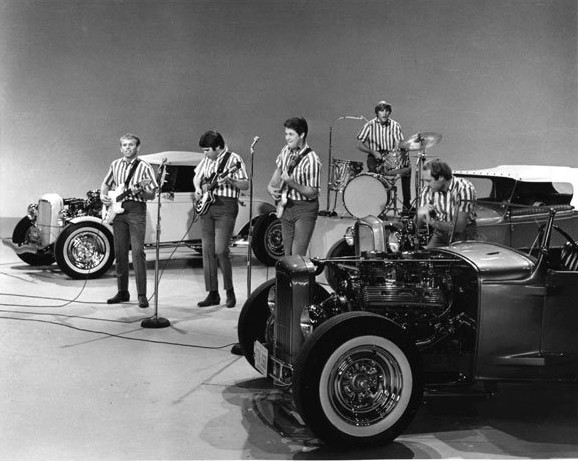
The Beach Boys performing "I Get Around" in 1964

Surf culture is reflected in surf music, with subgenres such as surf rock and surf pop. This includes works from such artists as Jan and Dean, The Beach Boys, The Surfaris ("Wipe Out!"), Dick Dale, The Chantays, The Shadows, and The Ventures. The music inspired dance crazes such as The Stomp, The Frug, and The Watusi. While the category surf music helped popularize surfing, most surfers at the time, such as Miki Dora, preferred R&B and blues. A newer wave of surf music has started in the acoustic riffs of artists such as Jack Johnson and Donavon Frankenreiter, who are both former professional surfers.

== Fashion ==
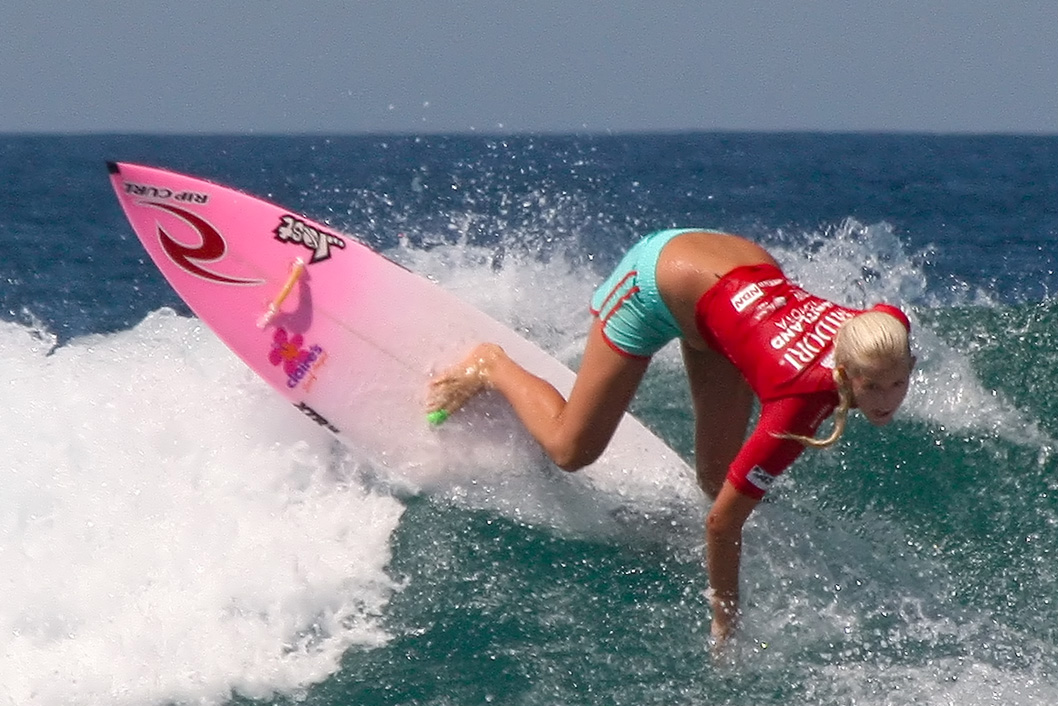
Bethany Hamilton wearing surfwear

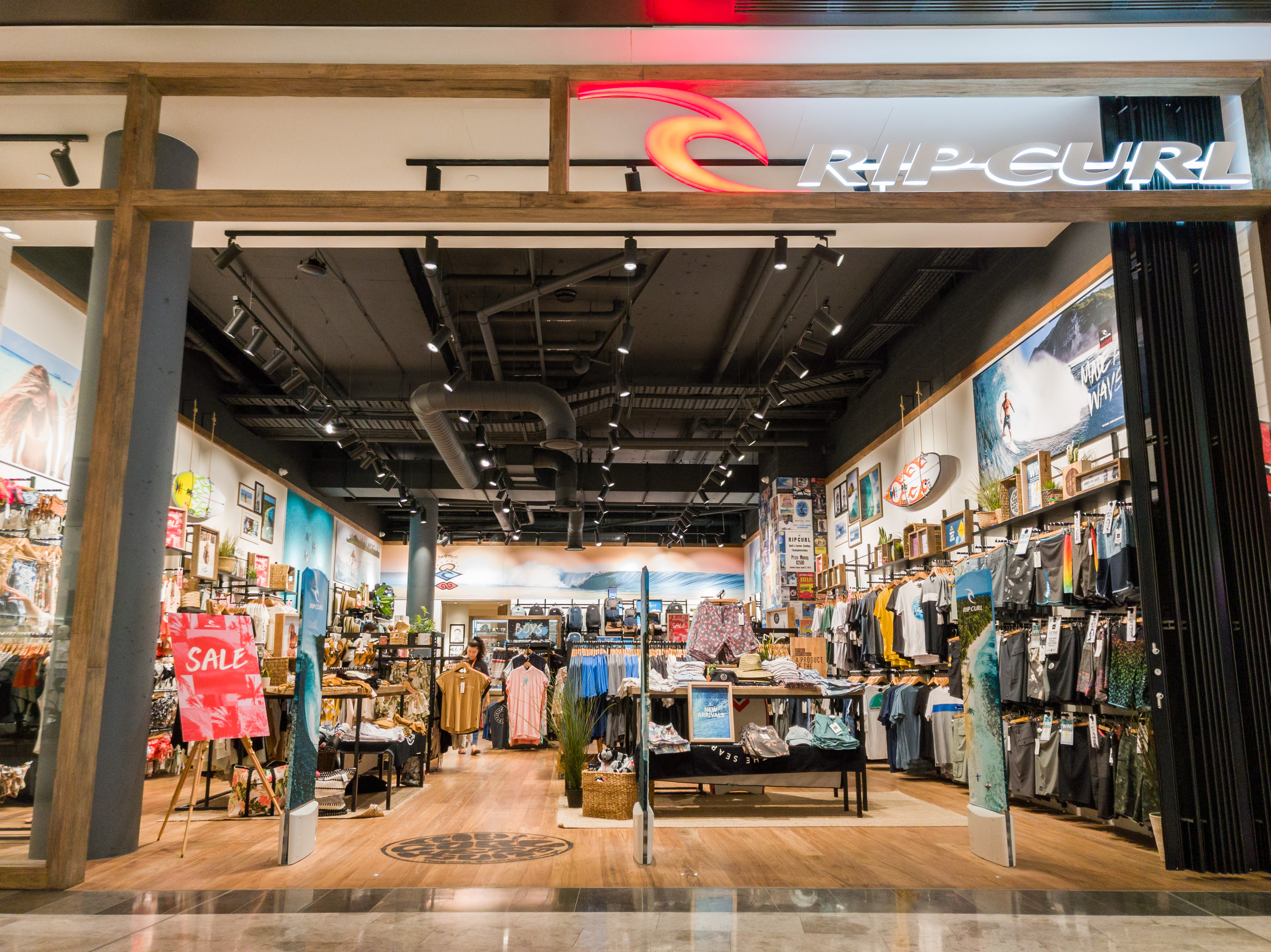
Rip Curl store in Perth

=== Surfwear ===
Surfwear is a popular style of casual clothing, inspired by surf culture. Many surf-related brand names originated as cottage industry, supplying local surfers with boardshorts, wetsuits, surfboards or leashes, as well as other hardware.

An early Australian surf fashion company was Kuta Lines, founded by Tony Brown after visiting Bali in 1973. Brown adapted Indonesian textiles and designs for his surfwear. From the 1980s, Kuta Lines used traditional ikat weaving and dyeing techniques, adapted to a heavier, fleecy fabric for cool climate surfing.

Some other clothing brands include O'Neill, Rip Curl, Quiksilver, Town & Country, Ocean Pacific, Billabong, Oakley, DaKine, Reef, Roxy, Volcom, Element, Hurley, Von Zipper, Golden Breed and RVCA.

=== Bikini ===
The bikini is an iconic piece of swim clothing. It was popularized in Europe initially but then was popularized in the United States after it was seen being worn by famous Hollywood stars. Based on this popularity, films used the bikini to market their movies. The bikini created a connection between sexuality and the exoticism that was seen in the people and culture of the Pacific Islands. For many years women did not have the option to not wear the bikini as there were not other pieces of surf wear being tailored to their need. This changed as the style of surf clothes was adopted by those who were not part of the culture. Companies began to create board shorts specifically for women's bodies, thus giving them an option besides the bikini to wear while surfing in competitions.

== Events ==
International Surfing Day celebrates the sport and lifestyle on June 20.

=== Surfing contests ===
Competitive surfing is a comparison sport. Riders, competing in pairs or small groups, are allocated a certain amount of time to ride waves and display their prowess and mastery of the craft. Competitors are then judged according to how competently the wave is ridden, including the level of difficulty, as well as frequency of maneuvers. There is a professional surfing world surfing championship series held annually at surf breaks around the world.

- Stubbies
- Bells
- Billabong Pro
- Pipe Masters
- Red Bull Big Wave Africa
- Surfabout
- Surfest
- Boardmasters Festival

Although competitive surfing has become an extremely popular and lucrative activity, both for its participants and its sponsors, the sport does not have its origins as a competitive pursuit. It is common to hear debate rage between purists of the sport, who still maintain the ideal of "soul surfing", and surfers who engage in the competitive and, consequently, commercial side of the activity. An organisation called the Spirit of Surfing has chosen not to accept surf label sponsorship, since an association of that sort could detract from the sentiment they wish to promote.

== Surfing organizations ==
- Surfrider Foundation
- World Surf League
- International Surfing Association
- Pleasure Point Night Fighters
- SurfAid International

== Spin-offs and influences ==
=== Boardsports ===
Surfers developed the skateboard to be able to "surf" on land. Later came windsurfing (also known as sailboarding), bodyboarding, wakeboarding, wakesurfing, skimboarding, snowboarding, riverboarding, kiteboarding, sandboarding, mountainboarding, carveboarding all now competitive sports. Another fast growing boardsport is skurfing a mix of surfing and more conventional water sports in which the participant is towed behind the boat. Pineboarding and sandboarding are recreational boardsports.

Business research on the evolution of multiple boardsports shows that multiple boardsport practices developed their own identity separate from surfing, and became distinct markets with their brands, consumers, and regulations.

== Surfing in multimedia ==
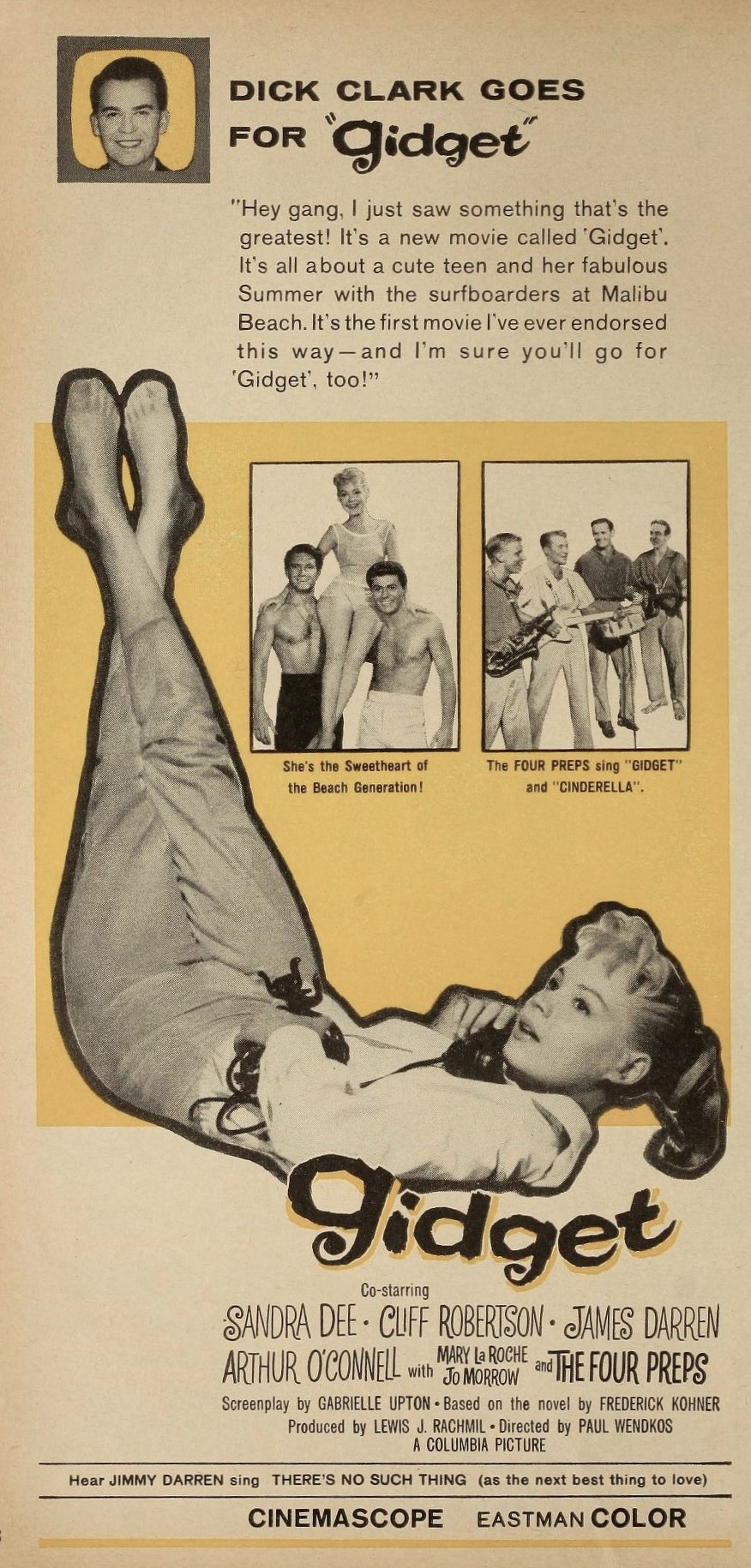
Gidget

=== Films about surfing ===
The surf culture is reflected in film. Bruce Brown's classic movie The Endless Summer glorified surfing in a round-the-world search for the perfect wave. John Milius's homage to the Malibu of his youth in Big Wednesday remains a metaphor for the similarities between the changing surf and life. The 1980s cult classics North Shore and Fast Times at Ridgemont High serve as mainstream introductions to teenage, light-hearted, superficial surf life. Beach movies such as the Gidget series, and Beach Party films such as Beach Blanket Bingo are less reverential depictions of the culture. Liquid Time (2002) is an avant-garde surf film that focuses solely on the fluid forms of tubing waves. Blue Crush (2002) is a film about surfer girls on Hawaii's North Shore. The sequel, Blue Crush 2 (2011), is a film about a California rich girl who travels to South Africa to find out more about her mother and herself. The 1991 film Point Break involves a group of bank robbers who are also surfers. The 1987 comedy film Surf Nazis Must Die features surfer gangs in the wake of an earthquake that destroys the California coastline. Surf's Up is an animated film made in 2007 about competitive penguin surfing loosely based on North Shore and parodying surfing documentaries, such as The Endless Summer and Riding Giants (2004). Soul Surfer is a 2011 biopic about real-life surfer Bethany Hamilton, who lost an arm at age 13 in a 2003 shark attack in Hawaii; a 2018 documentary, Bethany Hamilton: Unstoppable, explores Hamilton's adult life.

Some film events include the Sydney Fringe Festival, Bondi Beach, Sydney, Australia. the Surf Film Festival, Saint Jean de Luz Surf Film Festival, Wavescape Surf Film Festival in South Africa, and the New York Surfing Film Festival.

=== TV documentary series about surfing ===
- This Is Your Life presents Duke Kahanamoku (1957)
- NRG (1997)
- "Surfing 50 States" (2006)
- "I'm a Big Wave Surfer" [MTV's True Life] (2004)
- "Bra Boys: Blood is Thicker than Water (2007)

== Print media ==
Surfing Magazine

=== Surfing magazines ===
- Surfer's Journal
- The Surfer's Path
- Tracks
- Australia's Surfing Life
- Pitpilot magazine
- Wave Action Surf Magazine
- Surfer Magazine
- SurfGirl
- Surfing Magazine
- Zigzag
- White Horses

=== Surfing in fiction ===
The novel Gidget (originally published in 1957 as Gidget, The Little Girl with Big Ideas) by Frederick Kohner is a fictional first-person account of Franziska Hofer's experiences with surf culture in Malibu during the 50s. The author drew inspiration for his novel on the similar real-life experiences of his daughter, Kathy Kohner-Zuckerman. It was later adapted into the film Gidget (1959).

Tapping the Source (1984) by Kem Nunn was one of the first novels to written about surf culture in a realistic way. Considered the pioneering work of the "surf noir" subgenre, it won silver in the California Book Award for First Fiction and earned Nunn a National Book Award finalist for First Work of Fiction. Nunn would write several other surf-themed novels, including Dogs of Winter (1997) and Tijuana Straits (2004).

=== Surfing in non-fiction ===
==== Conceptual metaphor ====
The word "surf" is polysemous; having multiple, related meanings. "Surfing" the World Wide Web is the act of following hyperlinks. The phrase "surfing the Internet" was first popularized in print by Jean Armour Polly, a librarian, in an article called "Surfing the INTERNET", published in the Wilson Library Bulletin in June 1992.

==== Popular ====
- Finney, B. (1996). Surfing: A History of the Ancient Hawaiian Sport. Pomegranate. ISBN 9780876545942.
- Booth, D. (2001). Australian Beach Cultures: The History of Sun, Sand, and Surf. Taylor & Francis. ISBN 9780714681788.
- Holmes Coleman, S. (February 7, 2004). Eddie Would Go: The Story of Eddie Aikau, Hawaiian Hero and Pioneer of Big Wave Surfing. Macmillan. ISBN 9780312327187.
- Blair, J. (1983). The Illustrated Discography of Surf Music (1961–1965), Riverside, California.
- Finney, B.; Margan, F. (1970). A Pictorial History of Surfing. Paul Hamlyn, Sydney.
- Wardlaw, L. (1991). Cowabunga: The Complete Book of Surfing. Avon Books, New York.
- Young, N. (1983). The History of Surfing. Palm Beach Press.
- Kampion, D. (2003). Stoked! A History of Surf Culture. Gibbs Smith, Publisher.
- Colburn, B.; Finney, B.; Stallings, T.; Stecyk, C.; Stillman, D.; Wolfe, T (2002). Surf Culture: The Art History of Surfing. Laguna Art Museum in association with Ginko Press.
- Finnegan, William (2015). Barbarian Days: A Surfing Life. Penguin Books.

==== Natural science ====
- Scarfe, et al. (2003), The Science of Surfing Waves and Surfing Breaks, Scripps Institution of Oceanography Technical Report.
- Neville de Mestre, Mathematics and bodysurfing, Faculty of Information Technology, Bond University.
- Pengzhi, L. et al., A numerical study of breaking waves in the surf zone, School of Civil and Environmental Engineering, Cornell University.
- Waves and Beaches, Bascom, Willard Anchor Doubleday. (Science Study Series)
- Cool, NT, The Wetsand Wavecast Guide to Surf Forecasting: A Simple Approach to Planning the Perfect Sessions
- Massel, SR, Ocean Surface Waves: Their Physics and Prediction
- Flynn, PJ (1987), "Waves of Semiosis: Surfing's Iconic Progression", The American Journal of Semiotics
- M Stranger (1999), "The Aesthetics of Risk: A Study of Surfing", International Review for the Sociology of Sport, irs.sagepub.com
- Rinehart, RE. Sydnor, S. (2003), To the Extreme: Alternative Sports, Inside and Out, State University of New York Press
- Butts, SE. (2001), "Good to the last drop! Understanding surfer motivations", Sociology of Sport, physed.otago.ac.nz
- Beattie, K. (2001), Sick, "Filthy, and Delirious: surf film and video and the documentary mode", Continuum: Journal of Media & Cultural Studies, Vol. 15, No. 3.
- Osmond, G. Phillips, MG. O'Neill, M. (2006), "Putting up your Dukes: Statues Social Memory and Duke Paoa Kahanamoku", International Journal of the History of Sport, Taylor & Francis
- Rider, R., Hangin' ten: The common-pool resource problem of surfing, College of Arts and Sciences, Economics Program, California State University, San Marcos, California, 92096-0001, U.S.
- Rutsky, RL (1999), "Surfing the Other: Ideology on the Beach", Film Quarterly, Vol. 52, No. 4.
- Scott, P.(2003), "We shall Fight on the Seas and the Oceans ... We shall: Commodification, Localism and Violence", MC: a journal of media and culture, Vol. 6, No.1.
- Ormrod, J. (1978), "'Just the lemon next to the pie': Apocalypse, History and the Limits of Myth in Big Wednesday", Manchester Metropolitan University.
- Buckley, RC. (2002), "Surf tourism and sustainable development in Indo-Pacific islands: I. The industry and the islands". Journal of Sustainable Tourism
- Buckley, RC. (2002), "Surf tourism and sustainable development in Indo-Pacific islands: II. Recreational Capacity Management and Case Study", Journal of Sustainable Tourism, Vol. 10, No. 5.
- Stephen Wayne Hull (1976), A Sociological Study of the Surfing Subculture in the Santa Cruz Area, Masters Thesis, Department of Sociology, San Jose State University.
- Crawford, C. Waves of Transformation, Masters thesis.
- Lueras, Leonard. "Surfing, the Ultimate Pleasure". Honolulu: Emphasis International, 1984.
- Ehrlich, JN, "The Search: Issues of Play, Identification, Agency, and Deviance in the Absence of Mainstream Sports: Towards a Discovery of the Social Meaning of the Sport of Surfing", Honors Thesis for the Undergraduate Research Program in the Department of Sociology at the University of California, Irvine.
- Robin Canniford (2006), "Civilising Surfers: Exploring Subculture Through Historical Consumer Research", PhD Thesis.
- Canniford, R. & Shankar, A., "Marketing the Savage", Book Chapter in Cova, B., Shankar, A. and Kozinets, R. (2007) Consumer Tribes: Theory, Practice and Prospects, Oxford: Elsevier
- Canniford, R. & Ormrod, J., "Surf Soundtracks", European Association for Consumer Research Conference, University of Bocconi Milan 2007.
- Evers, C. (2006), How to Surf", Journal of Sport and Social Issues, 30, No. 3.
- Evers, C. (2006), Locals Only! Conference Proceedings, Everyday Multiculturalism, Macquarie University.
- Evers, C. (2004), "Men who Surf", Cultural Studies Review, 10, No. 1.
- Evers, C. (2005), "Becoming-Man Becoming-Wave", Doctoral Thesis, University of Sydney, Australia
- Warren, A. (2006) "Ripping waves: exploring the surf as a natural domain for young men", Honours Thesis: School of Earth & Environmental Sciences, University of Wollongong, Australia.
- Waitt, G and Warren, A. (2008), "Talking shit over a brew after a good session with your mates: surfing, space and masculinity", Australian Geographer 39(3), pp. 353–365.

==== Philosophical ====
- Kotler, Steven (2008) West of Jesus: Surfing, Science, and the Origins of Belief.

== See also ==
- Surfing
- History of surfing
- World surfing champion
- List of surfing topics
- List of surfers
- List of surfing records
- Surf forecasting

== Bibliography ==
- Dalzell, Tom; Victor, Terry, eds. (2006). The New Partridge Dictionary of Slang and Unconventional English (1st ed.). Routledge. ISBN 978-0415212588.
