= Hang Ten (brand) =

Asian casual clothing brand

- Product type: Surf lifestyle clothing
- Current owner: Li & Fung (2012-present) (retail stores); American Brand Holdings, LLC (copyright and licensing owner)
- Country: United States
- Introduced: 1960
- Markets: International
- Website: hangten.com

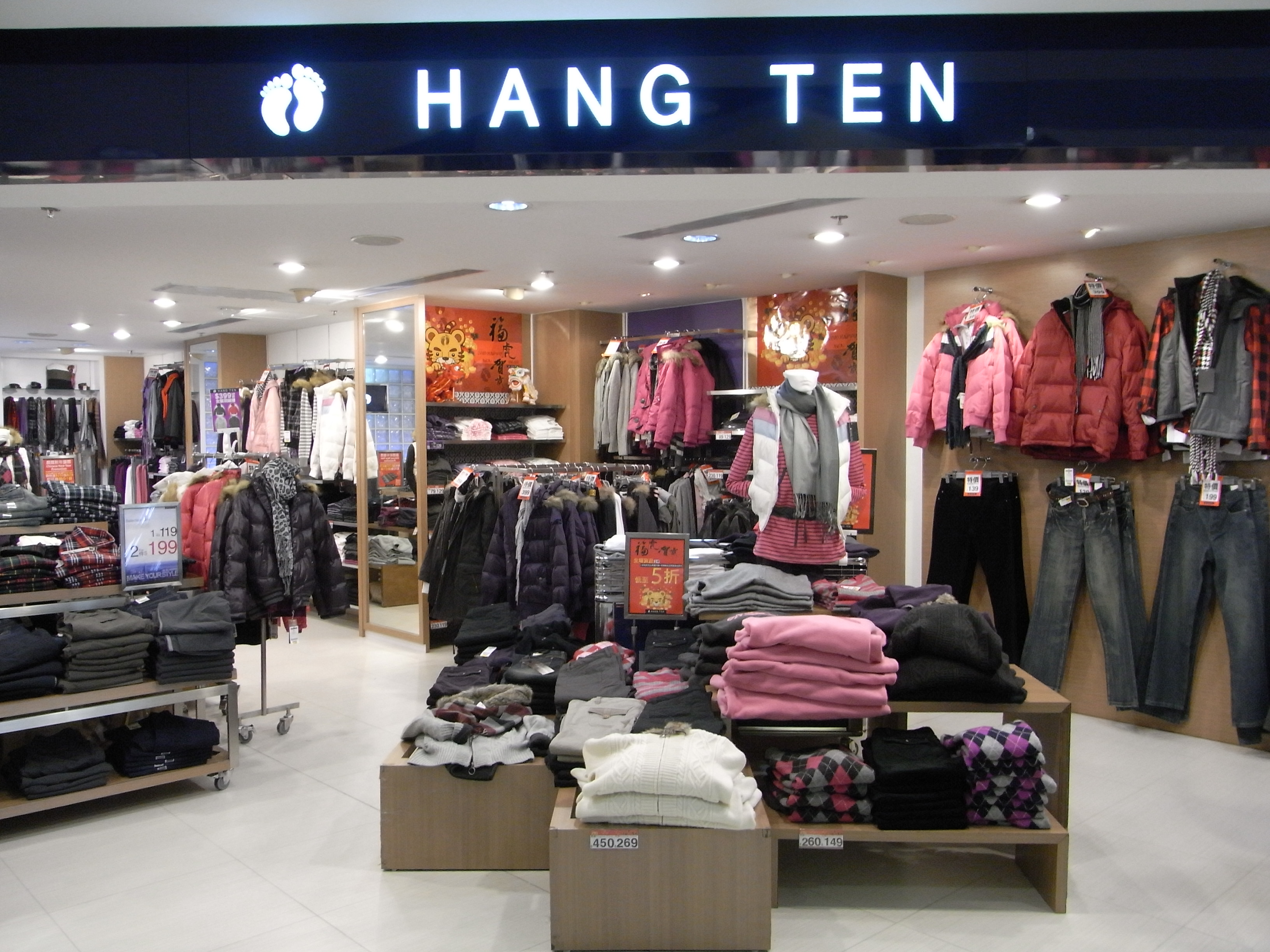
The storefront of a Hang Ten clothing shop in Kowloon City, Hong Kong

Hang Ten is a Hong Kong-based lifestyle and apparel company that had its origins in surf wear but now makes mass-market casual clothing and other items, selling the bulk of its products in the East Asian market, including Hong Kong, Taiwan and South Korea. Hang Ten's name comes from the surfing maneuver of 'hanging ten', that is, to hang all ten toes over the edge of the surfboard. Its original logo was a sewed-on pair of little feet. Today, the company licenses its logo and designs for apparel, paddle-boards, skateboards, surfboards, sun care, and other lifestyle products.

== History ==
Hang Ten was founded in 1960 in Seal Beach, California, by Doris Moore and Duke Boyd, as a maker of surfing apparel. It branched into other sports apparel, and helped develop the action-sports apparel industry. Boyd sold Hang Ten in 1970. The brand was bought by Hong Kong–based conglomerate Li & Fung in 2012.

== See also ==
- Golden Breed, a surf wear company subsequently founded by Duke Boyd
