= Golden Breed =

Clothing & surf apparel brand

- Product type: Surf lifestyle clothing
- Country: Australia
- Introduced: 1969
- Markets: International
- Website: Official website

Golden Breed is a surf lifestyle clothing brand, initially starting in California in 1969. The Male/Female logo was used by surfers, before being developed into a brand. The Textile Company Don Rancho Corporation initially launched the brand internationally, with a separate license to produce a range of items in Australia, held by John Arnold.

== History ==
Golden Breed initial designs were created by Francis "Duke" Boyd (an ex WW2 vet, who worked in advertising, but had taken to surfing), who had originally created designs for Hang Ten. The term "Golden Breed" had been used in some promotional material for Bing Surfboards. It was then used as the title by Dale Davis for his Surf Film "Golden Breed" in 1968. Boyd had co founded Hang Ten, sold it in 1970, and then immediately founded Golden Breed. Golden Breed was one of the first companies to sponsor surfers and competitions. One of these events was the "Golden Breed Expression Session," an event where there was in fact not competition - the surfers turned up and everyone was just paid $200 to surf a similar pattern part of the beach, as a demonstration, while people watched. This fitted in with many people at the time's viewpoint that surfing shouldn't be competitive.

In its heyday of the 1970-1980s, Golden Breed was one of the most famous Surf wear labels, very prevalent in the surfing scene. The operation in Australia was particularly successful. John Arnold, based in South Australia, was a successful businessman in the South Australian Surf Industry. He not only held the Australian licences for Golden Breed, but also the licences to produce O'Neil wetsuits with John Arnold establishing two large clothing production facilities in South Australia in the 1970s to satisfy local demand. Golden Breed's Australian operation produced designs for Olympic Uniforms, and both the Australian and US operations branched out into producing skateboards in the booming skateboard craze of the time.

The company ran into financial strife in the 1990s. It was then purchased by an Australian company, and while it has had a low profile for some time, is presently now producing clothes, with a number of outlets in Australia. It has been suggested that interest in older labels like Golden Breed and Crystal Cylinders is possibly due to nostalgia, a respect for the older original brands, and also perhaps purchases by an older market remembering their youth.

Golden Breed acquired Gordon and Smith Surfboards in 2015, after a long association with the owning Wilson family.
