= Lunada Bay Boys =

Aggressive surfer gang in Southern California

- Founding location: Palos Verdes Estates, California, U.S.
- Years active: 1960s-present
- Territory: Lunada Bay public beach (and its surf breaks) as well as its adjacent street Paseo Del Mar, in Palos Verdes Estates
- Ethnicity: White Californian Localist (Multi-generational Palos Verdes localism)
- Rivals: Redondo Beach surfers, various other regions

The Lunada Bay Boys or simply the Bay Boys, are a surfer gang in Palos Verdes Estates, California, known for their aggressive localism. In 2016, Newsweek called the Lunada Bay Boys "America's most notorious surf gang". The group's territorialism of the Lunada Bay public beach has raised concerns in the legal and surfing worlds. Although the group had non-violent beginnings in the 1960s as a self-described surfing "family" or fraternity, the Bay Boys are often considered a gang and use public harassment and intimidation as forms of confrontation and bullying.

== History ==
Lunada Bay had been considered an acclaimed big wave winter surf spot, with a right-hand break. The culture of Palos Verdes surfing clubs extends back as far as the 1930s with groups such as the Palos Verdes Surfing Club. Lunada Bay is at the base of 250-foot-high cliffs (76 m) on the Palos Verdes Peninsula. To get to this prime winter surfing spot, surfers have to hike down a dirt trail.

The Lunada Bay Boys formed in the 1960s as a fraternity of local surfers in the Palos Verdes region. An anonymous member stated, "It was more like a big family. I wouldn’t call it a gang. We used to camp down there every other night. We would almost live down there." The group wasn't known for its localism during the 1960s, and surfers within the group were not as prone to violence. At the time, the Lunada Bay Boys wasn't the only surf crew in the city and neighbored the "Portuguese Bend crew" (Portuguese Bend Club) as well as the "Haggerty's crew" (Haggerty's Surfing Club) of their respective surf spots. In the 1960s, the Lunada Bay Boys culture was mostly nonviolent and held close alliances with the neighboring Redondo Beach and Hermosa Beach. Activities of the original generation included camping down at the beach, fishing, diving, or shaping their surf boards in their shops. Becoming a member of the group was relaxed and involved no more than to be a local.

Around this time, localism of surf spots was considered common sense due to outside surfers often causing boards to fall in the rocks due to lack of leashes at the time. Big wave surfing pioneer Greg Noll, as well as U.S. champion Mike Purpus of Redondo Beach, would surf with the Bay Boys in Lunada Bay during this era. The acclaim of Lunada Bay as a surf spot led to the creation of Lunada Bay Wetsuits in the late '60s. Mike Purpus and surfers Dewey Weber, Collie Ragland, Don Craig, and Donald Takayama would model for these Lunada Bay Wetsuits ads. Around this time, members would hang out on a rock ledge with a stone balcony being created on the shoreline of Lunada Bay, as a hangout for local surfers (often referred to as their "fort").

In the 1970s, a leadership shift happened in which older members moved away, and newer members surfaced into leadership. Older members of the group were stated to have "kept it safe and sane", whereas the newer leadership began to hassle outsiders more directly. A surfer at Lunada Bay expressed that the reason violence escalated in years after was because the younger generation sought to show devotion to the territory in the presence of veteran members. Common acts of localism include hassling people, intimidation, vandalizing vehicles, slashing tires, throwing rocks, and inciting violence against non-locals. A surfer at Lunada Bay expressed his feelings on localism stating, "If we let every nice guy surf, there’d be a hundred guys out here. You have to nip it in the bud. The reason it’s not crowded is that people protect it. It’s fucked, dude. People think we’re a bunch of assholes, but you know what? We want to keep it like this so we can go somewhere where it’s fucking sacred."

One local told Stab magazine in 2017 that approximately one quarter to one half of local surfers in Lunada Bay are members of the Lunada Bay Boys.

== Legality and lawsuits ==
The city had the illegally constructed fort removed in 2016 in response to the concerns of the California Coastal Commission regarding public access to the beach.

The Palos Verdes Estates Police Department has been criticized for not taking effective legal action against the Lunada Bay Boys, with the Los Angeles Times reporting that "city leaders repeatedly downplayed the alleged harassment by the Bay Boys against other surfers at Lunada Bay". Palos Verdes Estates Police Chief Jeff Kepley has acknowledged that officers in his department "may have relationships with surfers accused of tormenting outsiders".

In March 2016, lawsuits were filed by several non-local surfers against twelve Bay Boys surfers and the city of Palos Verdes Estates. The lawsuits alleged that the Bay Boys harassed non-local surfers, held them underwater, and damaged their cars. The lawsuits also alleged that the city ignored the harassment and never investigated or punished the perpetrators.

Plaintiffs included surfer Diana Milena Reed, whose allegations included claims of sexual harassment, and El Segundo police officer Cory Spencer, who alleged assault.

The defendants denied the allegations. Defendant Frank Ponce stated the claims were "ridiculous" and that "there are no Bay Boys".

In 2023 and 2024, most of the Bay Boys individually settled the suits by paying damages ranging from $35,000 to $90,000 each, or agreeing to not use the beach for a year. In September 2024, the city settled the lawsuit, and agreed to add signs welcoming non-local people to the beach, add public stone benches on the bluffs, to improve the public access path, to remove unpermitted structures from the beach, for city employees to receive training on California coastal access laws, and for the police to begin investigating claims of harassment. The city also agreed to pay the plaintiff's attorney fees, estimated at between $1M and $4M. The city settled with no admission of liability. Palos Verdes Estates is home to around 13,000 residents and an annual budget of under $40 million. City attorney Christopher Pisano described the case as an "existential financial risk" for the city had the case gone to verdict. In April 2025, the city removed bundles of bamboo and other items from another illegally constructed structure in compliance with the settlement.

The California Coastal Commission welcomed the settlement, with the executive director Kate Huckelbridge noting the Commission's support of guaranteed public access to California's coasts and oceans for all visitors. Palos Verdes Estates Mayor Dawn Murdock response was more reserved, as she highlighted the city's mounting legal fees and the strain the litigation placed on city resources. Murdock stated that the city's focus should be redirected back on to resident priorities.

Palos Verdes Estates maintains a published policy of "zero tolerance for surfing territorialism and localism", stating that its coastal areas are open to the public regardless of a person's place of residence or economic status.

== In popular culture ==
A fictional representation of the Bay Boys is prominently featured in the book (and film), The Tribes of Palos Verdes.

2024 movie The Surfer, starring Nicolas Cage, is based on the Lunada Bay Boys.

== See also ==
Malibu Locals Only
