= Atlantic coast of Cornwall =

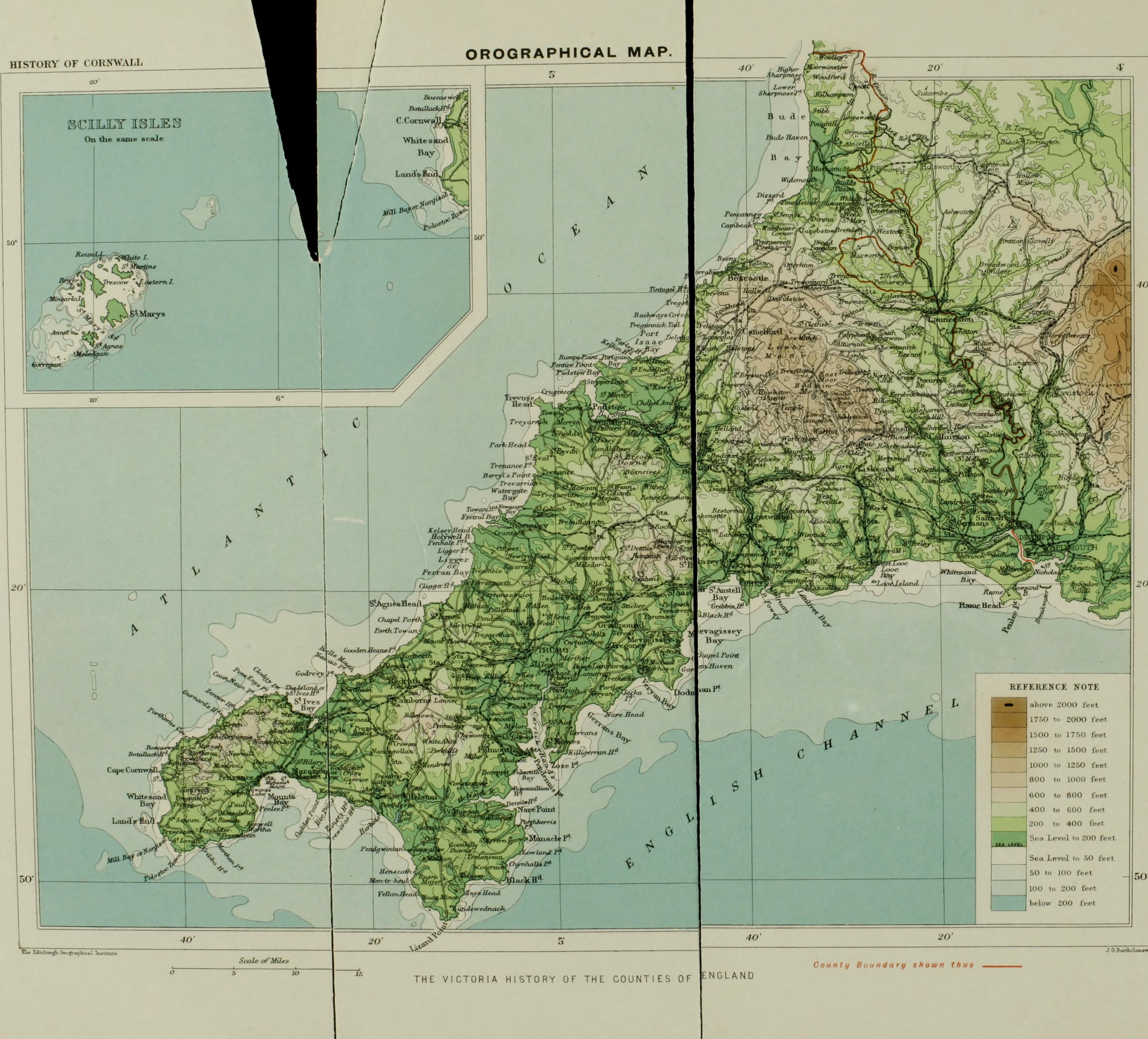
The Victoria History of the County of Cornwall (1906) Physical map

The Atlantic coast of Cornwall normally referred to locally as the North Coast, due to its north-facing orientation, makes up approximately half the coastline of Cornwall. Part of the South West Coast Path runs its entire length. It is known for its beaches, some of which are regarded by many to have the best surf in Europe. Fistral Beach has hosted the World Surfing Championships and hosts various other national and relevant surfing events every year.

Parts of this coastline have cliffs exceeding 100 ft in height. The highest are at Crackington Haven at 735 ft high. These cliffs are noted by students of geology due to the comparative ease of viewing otherwise hidden rock formations on the exposed faces. The Cornwall Area of Outstanding Natural Beauty (AONB) protects much of the coastline.

== See also ==
- Celtic Sea
