= SurfGirl =

Surf and beach lifestyle women's magazine

SurfGirl magazine is a surf and beach lifestyle magazine for women. It was the first independent magazine for women's surfing in the UK. SurfGirl is distributed through the US, Australia, Portugal, South Africa, Germany, and France. The magazine produces content on film, travel, and lifestyle centered around the sport aforementioned. It is published twice a year, once in April and once in October.

The magazine was established and first published a print edition in 2002. Besides its paper edition, the magazine produces digital content and distributes it through its social media accounts.

== History and profile ==
SurfGirl was founded in 2002. The magazine targets women of all ages and abilities who are interested in surfing and surf culture. It features news, travel articles, interviews with professional surfers and UK riders, surfing tips, beauty and health advice, and articles on fashion.

According to SurfGirl's website, the magazine is published two times a year and has international distribution. The magazine is published by Orca Publications at their Berry Road Studios, in Newquay, Cornwall.
