= Malibu Locals Only =

Gang in Malibu

Malibu Locals Only (MLO) is a group of youths local to Malibu, California, that has been associated with several violent attacks along with other criminal activity in the city. Often involved in party, bar or beach fights, the group has maintained aversion toward residents of the San Fernando Valley region, as well as other outsiders who find their way into Malibu for recreation or leisure. They are thought to be an unorganized group of 10 to 15 people, who are often criticized by former MLO members for attacking innocent people rather than pursuing the organization's original goals.

== Origins ==
Initially established in the 1960s by a group of Malibu surfers, the group sought to stop San Fernando Valley surfers from using their beaches (which, at the time, were private) and protect students of Malibu who were the minority in high schools at the time (because Malibu High School had not yet been constructed). The group began to graffiti the letters "MLO", which eventually became the name by which the group was known, and Malibu Locals Only was born.

== Current activity ==
The gang has been responsible for multiple instances of brutality. It has also been involved in many encounters with Pepperdine University students, frequently at the Malibu Inn.

== See also ==
- Lunada Bay Boys
