= Wave Action Surf Magazine =

Wave Action Surf Magazine is a publication about surfing.

== Background ==
Wave Action Magazine began in a small apartment in Huntington Beach, California through the vision of Mike Freihofer and Pete Rocky. Both surfers had been working at a local Southern California Surf Magazine called International Surf, published by Steve Zeldin (who now publishes Foam and Water magazines). The two, along with friends Tracy Mikulec and Jake Knight came together to create a simple yet important print media business. Wave Action was the first title that emerged from the World Oceans Media brand. September 1993 was the launch with Wave Action Surf Magazine (the late Todd Chesser was on the cover) started with a micro sized budget and support through industry friends.

Wave Action eventually spun off four sister publications and graduated from that small garage in HB to a larger one in San Clemente. Years passed and the support behind Wave Action continued to grow and in the process made a fairly significant impact for the two other giant publications within the sport...Surfer and Surfing. Wave Actions “All Grom Issue” set the footprint for Surfer Magazines “Hot 100”. It also led Surfing Magazine to devote a great deal of attention to the future champions of the sport rather than only covering the ASP contenders of the day.

Essentially, Wave Action set the pace for the youth movement that ran full speed through the 1990s and into the early 2000s. It also laid the foundation for publications such as Transworld Surf and other global action sports magazines.
