= Boardmasters Festival =

Annual event held in Cornwall, United Kingdom

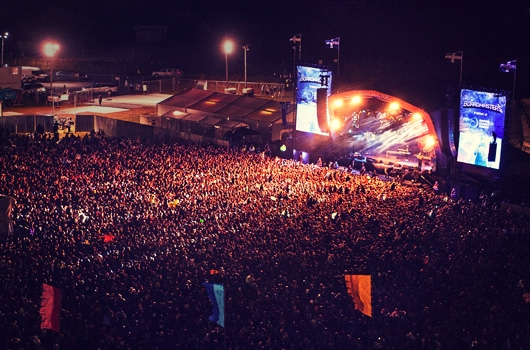
- Genre: Rock, Indie rock, Alternative rock, Dance
- Dates: Second weekend of August
- Frequency: Annually
- Locations: Newquay, Cornwall, England
- Coordinates: 50°26′20″N 5°2′32″W
- Years active: 1981–present
- Most recent: 5-9 August 2026
- Next event: 2027
- Participants: See lineups
- Attendance: 53,000 (2023)
- Website: boardmasters.com

Boardmasters Festival is an annual event held in Cornwall, United Kingdom, usually spanning five days on the second weekend of August. The event is a combination of live music and surfing/skateboarding competitions in and around the town of Newquay. The festival was founded in 1981 as a surfing competition, and in 2005 it was expanded to include music acts, taking place at Watergate Bay. In 2024 the official capacity of the event was increased to 58,000.

The majority of the music performances take place to the north of Newquay near Watergate Bay. The Men's Pro 5 Star WQS surf competition takes place on Fistral Beach where a skate ramp is built for the BMX and Skateboard competitions. Other sporting events include The Women's Open, WSL Men's Longboard, WSL Women's Longboard, Boys/Girls Pro Junior and Under 12's. It is also known to feature a well-being program, a tea-room, and a fairground.

The event is owned and managed by Vision Nine Group. In 2017 the Boardmasters Foundation was started to support local causes, such as the RNLI, with c. £436,000 raised up to 2023.

== Music festival ==
The Watergate Bay site hosts the music arena and all festival camping. The festival runs from Wednesday to Monday, with music performances running from Friday to Sunday across ten stages: The Main Stage, Unleashed, The Point, The Land Of Saints, Corona Sunsets, The View, The Netloft, The Dockyard, Keg & Pasty and the VIP Bar/Stage. Past years have seen performers such as Bastille, Faithless, Chase & Status, Snoop Dogg, The Chemical Brothers, Stormzy, Ed Sheeran, Deadmau5, George Ezra, Two Door Cinema Club, Calvin Harris, Catfish and the Bottlemen, Years and Years, Dizzee Rascal and Craig David.

== List of music headliners ==
Boardmasters Festival
| Year | Dates | Headliners | Full Line Up |
|---|---|---|---|
| 2025 | 6-10 August | Raye, Central Cee, The Prodigy | Boardmasters Line-Up 2025 |
| 2024 | 7-11 August | Chase & Status, Sam Fender, Stormzy | Boardmasters Line-Up 2024 |
| 2023 | 9–13 August | Lorde, Liam Gallagher, Florence + The Machine | Boardmasters Line-Up 2023 |
| 2022 | 10–14 August | George Ezra, Disclosure, Kings Of Leon | Boardmasters Line-Up 2022 |
| 2021 | 11–15 August | Foals, Gorillaz, Jorja Smith | Boardmasters Line-Up 2021 |
| 2020 | 5–9 August | Skepta, The 1975, Kings Of Leon | Cancelled due to COVID-19 pandemic |
| 2019 | 7–11 August | Wu-Tang Clan, Florence and the Machine, Foals | Cancelled due to poor Weather |
| 2018 | 8–12 August | Catfish and the Bottlemen, The Chemical Brothers, George Ezra | Boardmasters Line-Up 2018 |
| 2017 | 9–13 August | Two Door Cinema Club, Jamiroquai, Alt-J | Boardmasters Line-Up 2017 |
| 2016 | 10–14 August | Chase & Status, Deadmau5, James Bay | Boardmasters Line-Up 2016 |
| 2015 | 5–9 August | Faithless, Rudimental, Bastille | Boardmasters Line-Up 2015 |
| 2014 | 6–10 August | Chase & Status, Snoop Dogg, Bastille | Boardmasters Line-Up 2014 |
| 2013 | 7–11 August | The Vaccines, Basement Jaxx, Ben Howard | Boardmasters Line-Up 2013 |
| 2012 | 8–12 August | Ed Sheeran, Dizzee Rascal | Boardmasters Line-Up 2012 |
| 2011 | 10–14 August | Klaxons, Fatboy Slim | Boardmasters Line-Up 2011 |
| 2010 | 4–8 August | Newton Faulkner, Leftfield, Seasick Steve | Boardmasters Line-Up 2010 |
| 2009 | 5–9 August | The Streets, Cypress Hill | Boardmasters Line-Up 2009 |
| 2008 | 4–10 August | Groove Armada, The Pigeon Detectives | Boardmasters Line-Up 2008 |
| 2007 | 6–12 August | Paolo Nutini, Ash | Boardmasters Line-Up 2007 |
| 2006 | 31 July – 6 August | Feeder, Starsailor | Boardmasters Line-Up 2006 |
| 2005 | 1–7 August | James Blunt, Razorlight | Boardmasters Line-Up 2005 |

== Cancellations ==
In 2014, the organisers of the festival were forced to cancel the final day at the Watergate Bay site due to the remnants of Hurricane Bertha. Artists due to perform were Bastille, George Ezra, Reel Big Fish, DJ EZ, 2manydjs and Catfish and the Bottlemen. However, the surf competition at Fistral Beach continued as normal and full refunds for the cancelled day were received by customers.

The 2019 event was also cancelled hours before it was due to take place, after serious concerns of bad weather forecast to disrupt the event. Boardmasters was then cancelled for a second year in a row in 2020, due to the COVID-19 pandemic.

== Award nominations ==
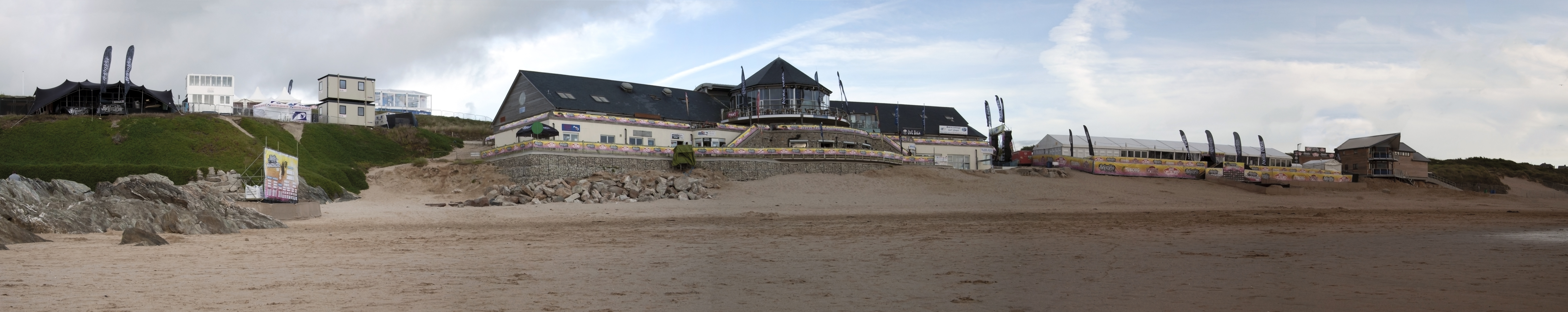
Fistral Beach showing the beach bar setup ready for the 2010 festival

Boardmasters was nominated for ‘Best Medium Sized Festival’ at the 2014 UK Festival Awards, alongside Secret Garden Party, Camp Bestival, and winners We Are FSTVL. In 2023 it was nominated again for the UK Festival Awards, this time in the ‘Best Large Festival’ category.

== Surf and skate ==
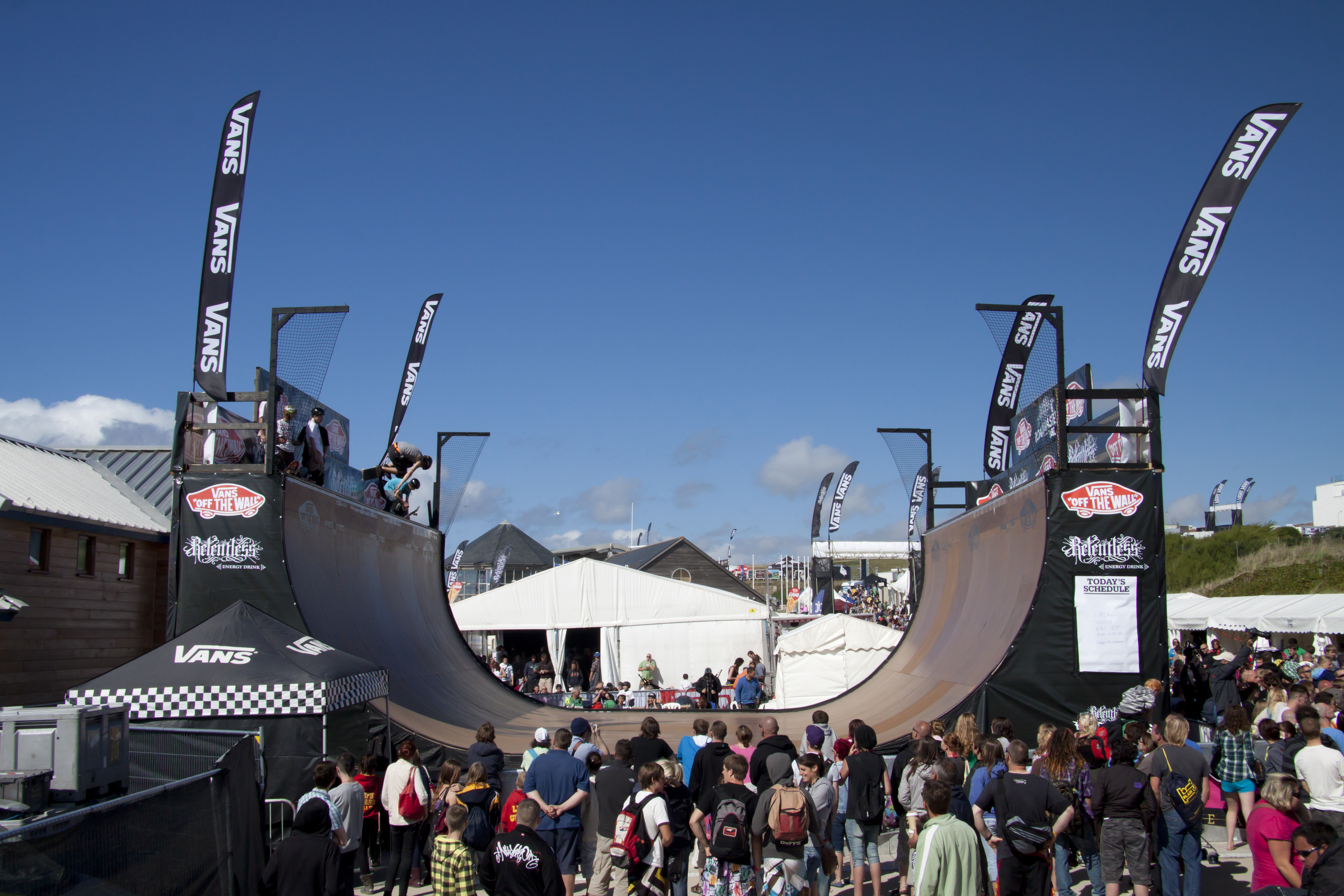
The vert ramp at the 2010 festival during the first skateboard free practice session

At Fistral Beach the surf, BMX and skate competitions take place along with more music during the evenings. A small mini-ramp is set up on the headland and the vert ramp is built in the beach car park. A purpose-built beach bar hosts more musical acts and evening beach sessions.

The festival has received local criticism due to its greater focus on the music performances, rather than the "extreme sports" side that the event was originally known for.

== Professional surf competition winners ==
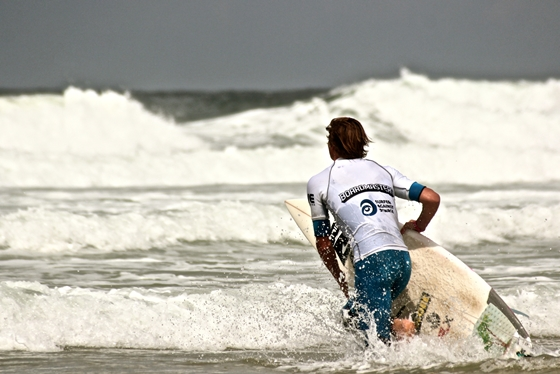
Pro surfer at Boardmasters Festival 2014

| Event | Winner | Second |
|---|---|---|
| 2014 Men's Open | Jock Barnes (AUS) | |
| 2014 Women's Open | Keshia Eyre (POR) | |
| 2014 Longboard Pro | Ben Skinner (GBR) | |
| 2013 Men's Open | Billy Stairmand (NZL) | |
| 2013 Women's Open | Keshia Eyre (POR) | |
| 2012 Men's Open | Charly Martin (GLP) | |
| 2012 Women's Open | Miku Uemura (HAW) | |
| 2011 Men's Open | Romain Cloitre (REU) | |
| 2010 Men's 5 Star WQS Surf | Marc Lacomare | Jay Quinn |
| 2010 Aerial Assault | Alan Stokes | Oli Adams |
| 2010 Vans Summer Sessions Skate Vert | Sam Beckett | Andy Scott |
| 2010 Vans Summer Sessions BMX Mini Ramp | Alex Colburn | Tobias Wicke |
| 2009 Men's 5 Star WQS Surf | Daniel Ross | Txaber Trojaola |
| 2009 Aerial Assault | Micah Lester | Reuben Ash |
| 2009 Vans Summer Sessions Skate Vert | Alex Perelson | Sam Beckett |
| 2009 Vans Summer Sessions BMX Mini Ramp | Ben Wallace | Martin Cooper |
