= Spirit of Surfing =

Surfing initiative started in 1995

Spirit of Surfing is a low-key initiative started in 1995 by longtime surfer, Peter Cuming, surf elders Rob Connelly and Nat Young, as well as surf artist Roscoe Kermode. Spirit of Surfing was established to promote the traditions of free surfing; respect for the ocean, the land, and indigenous and local cultures wherever surfers are and travel; fostering community spirit; and an harmonious relationship with the natural environment. These key messages are shared and encouraged in the water amongst surfers and through other opportunities such as festivals, forums, gatherings and local surfing communities. It was first presented to the Angourie Boardriders in late 1995, at Yamba, in New South Wales (NSW), Australia. They adopted the general Spirit of Surfing (SoS) principles in their approach to their activities including a stronger focus on active beach restoration work as part of their regular surfing sessions and competitions. Peter Cuming liaised with Nat Young, past world short and longboard surfing champion, who supported the aims, and raised the concept in his working relationship with the World Longboard Championship Tour to engage in adopting the principles.

The Surfers Code, or Tribal Law (Lore) as it was initially called, was developed as an SoS project by Rob Conneelly, based on the verbally shared "Gentlemen's Rules" of old; seeded by ideas and discussion of the concept between Conneelly and Cuming, liaison with Aboriginal musician-surfer, Merv Graham, surfer Wayne Murphy, and design support from Roscoe Kermode. This resulted in a “Tribal Law” poster which emerged under Roscoe's skilled hands, and was launched at the Margaret River Surfing Classic in 1996, which also included an “expression session” to promote creative ‘free’ surfing. It was again part of the Margaret River Masters Surf Classic in 1997, and the focus of a project with local community healthcare groups in Margaret River, sponsored by the W.A Health Promotion Foundation, in response to growing surf related injuries, and promoting the necessary safety aspects of surfing along the powerful South-Western Australian coastline. In October 1998, at Margaret River in Western Australia, the group erected a Tribal Law (Tribal Lore) plaque at Surfer's Point, explaining surfers' principles of right-of-way, safety and respect in the water. Follow-up plaques at ‘Lefthanders’ and other well-known nearby breaks in the South West were planned, as well as at Perth surf beaches, and plaques created however didn't eventuate. To this day, the plaques haven't resurfaced and must truly be valued by those that have them!

Hearing of the Surfer's Code and the Margaret River plaque, a group of surfing interests from the West Coast of Victoria-based around Bells Beach-Winkipop contacted SoS trust members and with Roscoe Kermode's artistic support, a code was developed for Bells Beach and launched as the Bells Beach Surfers Code in 2000. The Bells Beach Spirit of Surfing committee was formed to further develop projects at Bells Beach. This committee includes the Surf Coast Shire, Torquay Board riders, Surfers Appreciating the Natural Environment (SANE), Surfing Victoria Inc. Surfrider Foundation, and the Bells Beach Surfing Reserve Advisory Committee. Victorian-based Mornington Peninsular Surfriders, hearing of the surfers code, liaised with the Bells Beach group and arranged distribution of the general surfer's code poster as a guide for surfers on the East Coast Peninsular.

SoS supported and facilitated the Spirit of Surfing/ Surf Elders Gathering held at Broken Head, Byron Bay, New South Wales, in June 2000, organized by and held at the home of longtime surfer and Greens New South Wales Senator, Ian Cohen. The 2-day weekend gathering of 30 people, facilitated by Peter Cuming, represented around 700 years of personal surfing experience. It included representatives from the Surfrider Foundation, Australian Professional Surfing Association, and surfers from Southern Queensland, Sydney, NSW North Coast and Central Coasts, and Bells Beach/Victorian West Coast regions. Surfing elders such as George Greenough, Nat Young, Dick Hoole and Rusty Miller shared visions and stories. The gathering discussed the growing interest in the sport and lifestyle of surfing, concerns about commercialisation, ‘surf rage’ and the Spirit of Surfing concept. As a result of the gathering the principles and establishment of the Spirit of Surfing Trust was supported. A number of media releases presented the key issues that the Spirit of Surfing concept was tackling and commitments were made to promote the SoS principles.

Later that year, the Surfrider Foundation in NSW, launched a version of the Surfers Code, under the guidance of Neil Lazarow with support from the formative Spirit of Surfing Trust, A ‘Law of the Ocean’ forum, sponsored by Southern Cross University, was also held in Byron Bay in 2001, and discussed a range of issues, implications and responses related to ‘surf rage’ events, including the Surfers Code and Spirit of Surfing concept.

In 2000 when Nat Young was seriously assaulted in a "surf rage" incident at Angourie Point, he gifted $7000 he received as payment from a television interview on the incident to the SoS initiative. These funds were used to support the work of the movement including development of the Bells Beach, Victoria, Spirit of Surfing (SoS) project. Through 2000 to 2002 the Bells Beach SoS working group, supported by SoS consulted with local surfing groups, Aboriginal traditional owners and the local council, Surf Coast Shire to design and erect key standing stones reading "Respect the Ocean", "Respect the Land", "Respect each Other", as a local interpretation of the surfing spirit. These stones are seen by all surfers who use the path to the famous Bells Beach break. The project involved locating and installing hand carved sandstone plaques, and a signing ceremony involving some of the first surfers to surf Bells Beach, local Aboriginal custodians, Surf Coast Shire, Bells Beach Surfing Reserve, SoS, Surfrider Foundation, SANE and Torquay board rider club representatives.

The Pacifique Boardriders, near Bundaberg, in Central Queensland established an SoS Project at their focus beach at Bargara. Initially established in 1963 the Pacific Boardriders were renewed in the early 2000s with a membership of over 200. The group's aims and objectives as well as surfing guidelines include the Spirit of Surfing's principles of safe and free surfing, and respecting the ocean, the land, and each other. A broader Spirit of Surfing project committee was also formed to develop a creative signage installation at Bargara, to include representatives from the local indigenous Murri and South Sea islander community, local residents and Chamber of Commerce, and the Burnett River Shire Council.

Lynne Hulme from the Surf Coast Shire, Surf Coast Shire Council based at Torquay (and member of the Bells Beach SoS project) contacted SoS Trust to hold a 2nd Spirit of Surfing Gathering at Torquay, in April 2003, just before and as part of the iconic Bells annual surfing contest. Facilitated by Peter Cuming and Elizabeth Bragg, it was attended by over 70 people including surf elders, surfing industry representatives, surfboard designers, shapers, academics and government agencies, surf psychologists and educators, Surf Coast Shire representatives and regional surfers. Workshop proceedings were prepared from the forum which focused on the need to develop a more sustainable surfing industry, including codes of practice and sourcing of materials; educating travelling surfers about impacts on local cultures; encouraging surfers to play a greater role in protecting and regenerating coastal areas, dealing with anger/anger management in the water, and modern surfers developing more sustainable lifestyles.

Nat Young has continued to fund the development and erection of Surfers Code signage at a range of locations in Australia, Europe, and the USA (e.g. Rincon). This includes Byron Bay, where Cuming introduced the concept and a representative of the Bells Beach SoS working group to Ben King, president of the Byron Bay Boardriders Club, around 2005. Ben then worked with Nat Young, Byron Shire Council and Cape Byron Trust, to help establish Surfers Code signage at Clark's Beach near well known break The Pass, and at Broken Head.

The Surfers Code, and articles on its development and importance given increasing numbers of surfers in the water and ongoing commercialisation, have been printed to promote awareness in a wide range of surfing magazines, in Australia and internationally. This includes Tracks, Surfing World, Surfers Path, Surf Session (France), and Wave Surfgirl. A range of books and other publications such as Nat Young's 'Surf Rage' Nat Young, and 'Surf's Up - The Girl's Guide to Surfing' by Louise Southerden include the Spirit of Surfing and Surfer's Code principles.

The SoS has not accepted sponsorship at this stage on the basis that it may dilute or affect the capacity to promote the messages, however encourages industry and business participation in applying the principles. SoS has supported action by and participated in organisations such as the National Surfing Reserves Committee, which has established surfing reserves in key and iconic surfing locations, such as Angourie and Lennox Head, New South Wales.

Cuming was a forum panel speaker at the Byron Bay Surf Festival in 2014, on the impact of surfing culture in the developing world including indigenous communities. The forum was facilitated by surfer Lauren Hill, representing the SoS principles related to the influences surfing has, both positive and negative, on existing cultures, and the potential for surfing to support and strengthen the connection people have to their land, local communities, and cultures.

SoS is developing a website that provides information on its range of projects, including the Surfers Code. The site will feature surfboard designers, shapers, professional, recreational, and free surfers, as well as artists, musicians, and activists, expressing what the ‘spirit of surfing’ means to them.
