= Fistral Beach =

Beach on the north coast of Cornwall, England

Coordinates: 50.41645°N 5.10235°W

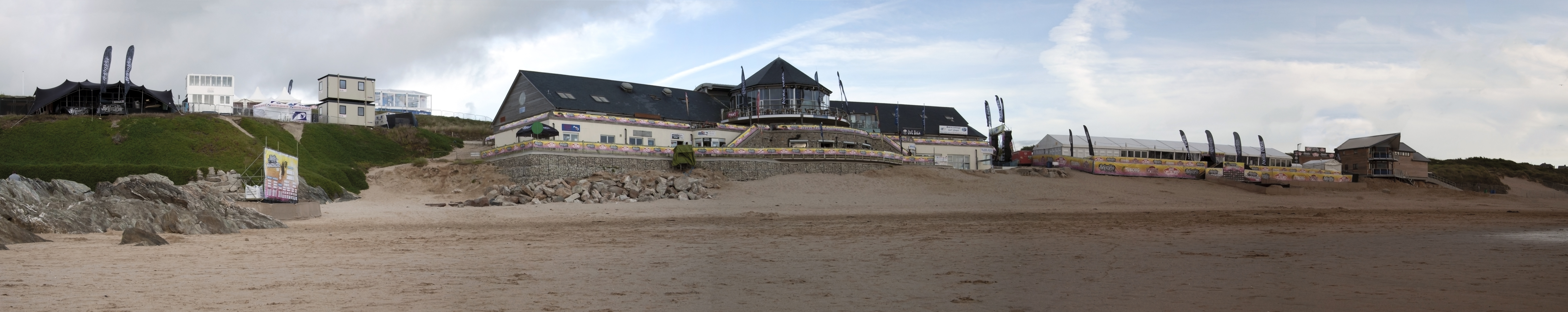
Fistral Beach showing the beach bar setup ready for the 2010 Boardmasters Festival

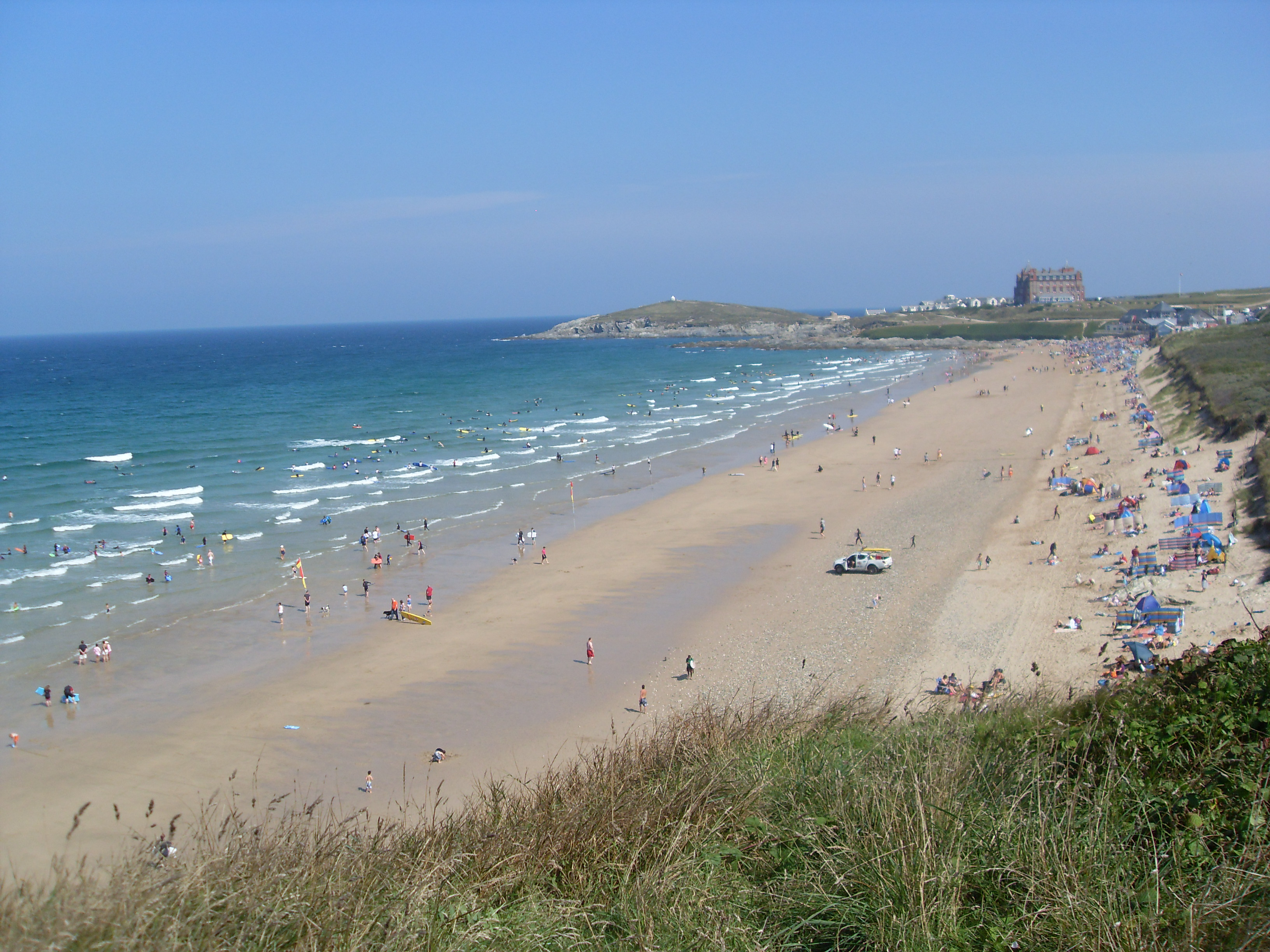
Fistral Beach, Britain's most famous surfing beach

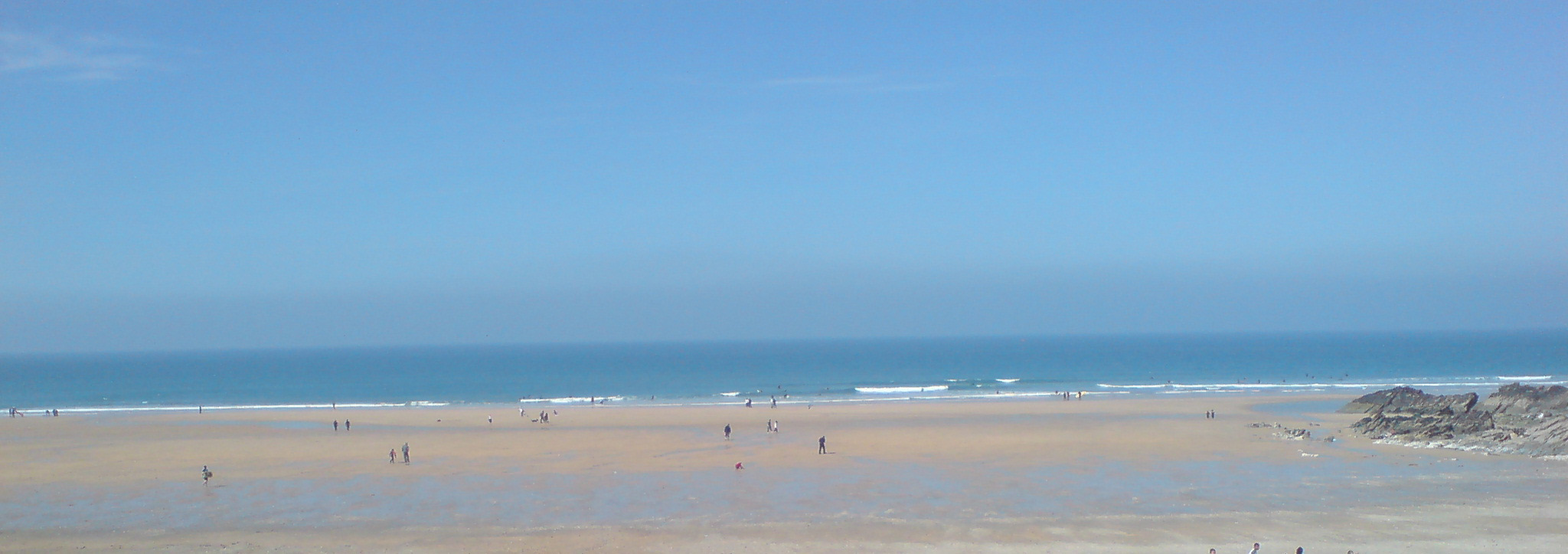
Panoramic view of Fistral Beach

Fistral Beach is in Fistral Bay (Cornish: Baya Fystal) on the north coast of Cornwall, England, United Kingdom. It is situated half a mile west of Newquay at grid reference SW 797 620.

Fistral Bay is bounded by two promontories, Towan Head to the north and Pentire Point East (not to be confused with Pentire Head) to the south.

The straight sandy beach faces west-northwest onto the Atlantic and is approximately 750 metres (2,460 ft) long. It is backed by steep sand dunes and is overlooked by the Headland Hotel. The name "Fistral" is recorded as Fistal in 1813, coming from the Cornish bystel meaning "foul water, bile or gall" (compare Welsh bustl) probably in reference to the waves making it an unsuitable landing site.

== Surfing ==
Fistral Beach is best known for surfing. Its west-facing aspect exposes it to Atlantic swells ensuring consistent waves suitable for surfing. The beach is the venue for major international surfing competitions and a competition suite for judges and competitors has been built at North Fistral along with a surf museum.

The British Surfing Association, Newquay Surf Life Saving Club and the Newquay Boardrider Club are all based at Fistral Beach.

The Cribbar, a reef at the north end of the beach, causes waves to break when the swell is high. It is considered to be Cornwall's premier "big wave" location with wave faces as high as 30 feet (9.1 m).

Fistral is considered one of the most consistent surf breaks in the UK, with westerly and north-westerly groundswells producing powerful beach break waves suitable for intermediate to advanced surfers.

On 21 September 2006, Fistral Beach hosted the British Surfing Association's invitational Gold Rush Big Wave Competition. During the competition the surf was over 8 feet (2.4 m) high because of the effect of Hurricane Gordon. The winner was 28-year-old Scott Eastwood of the Channel Islands who scored a perfect 10 in the final.

The Boardmasters Festival is also held at Fistral Beach.
