= Media in Cornwall =

The media in Cornwall has a long and distinct history. The county has a wide range of different types and quality of media.

== History ==
=== Timeline ===
1688	1801	1870	1901	1904	1927	1949	1956	1956	1962	1982	1992	1998	2000	2001	2006	2008
Start of Packet ships	first local Cornish newspaper	Telegraphy arrives in Cornwall	first radio transmission on The Lizard	first cinema screenings in Redruth	first BBC Radio broadcasts receivable in Cornwall	_{first magazine published in Cornwall}	first BBC TV broadcasts in Cornwall	first BBC FM broadcasts receivable in parts of Cornwall	first UK satellite Earth Station starts on The Lizard	first BBC local radio in Cornwall	first ILR station in Cornwall	DVB in Cornwall starts	DAB radio starts broadcasting in Cornwall	Broadband in Cornwall starts	3G mobile phone starts in Cornwall	Radio St Austell Bay launches as Cornwall's first mainland Community; Radio

=== Background ===
Cornwall's geography, a long, narrowing peninsula, pointing into the Atlantic, made travel by land (Cornwall is only joined to Devon by a short four-mile stretch of land—the River Tamar divides the rest) slow, unreliable and poor. (Crossing the Tamar was by a few ancient stone bridges and two ferries to Plymouth). Selling and distribution of market goods used the sea and major rivers. However, improved telecommunications stimulated growth in the ports of Cornwall and the exchange of goods, particularly of mining products, like copper and tin. It also led to previously unexplored markets being discovered, for example arsenic, a by-product of tin production, was exported to the US, where it was used in the production of pesticides in the cotton fields.

Before the arrival of mass media in Cornwall and telegraphy, since 1688, Falmouth was the hub of the Packet ships Post Office mail system. Newspapers were slow to develop in Cornwall. Despite the first British newspaper (London Gazette) starting in 1665, due to poor roads, and long distances, distribution of national newspapers did not start fully until the coming of the railways in the 1840s. Outside key urban areas like Truro and Falmouth, national news travelled slowly, and unreliably, by word of mouth.

Mines used cork bulletin boards displayed in "the dry", a building used for miners to change in and out of work clothes. The information displayed included: employment, tin output, rates of pay (for piece workers) and new Resource extractions. Little information was passed on concerning news from the neighbouring village, or the next market town along the road.

Although the Cornish language had effectively died out by the early nineteenth century, dialects and accents remained strong throughout the whole of Cornwall. Different areas within Cornwall had their own variations from each other. It was more common for a miner, seeking work to travel from his home in West Cornwall to South Africa, than it was for him to travel to the Tamar Valley, or other mining locations within Cornwall. The communications with developing mining towns in the British Empire were better than they were within the county.

With the major slump in mining at the end of the nineteenth century, and the coming of the Great War, Cornwall was about to embark on a process of change, which has continued to the present day.

==== Telegraphy ====
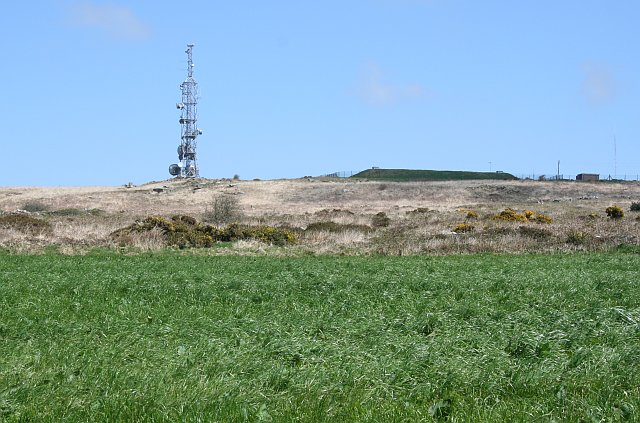
The telecommunications mast on Carnmenellis hill; the mound to the right is a covered reservoir according to the OS map

At Porthcurno in 1870 Britain became wired to the world. For the first time telegraphy made it possible for Britain to communicate with its colonies in the British Empire. Originally, the intention was to land telegraphy cables at Falmouth, Cornwall, but a last minute change by the Falmouth Gibraltar and Malta Telegraph Company ensured that Porthcurno has gone into telecommunications history. The reason was to protect the cables from dredging damage in the busy Falmouth harbour. Although the new telecommunications industry itself did not affect the communications between the sparse and geographically spread out villages and towns within Cornwall, it started the Victorian Internet, which had a profound effect on mobilising the speed of change during the latter days of the Industrial Revolution.

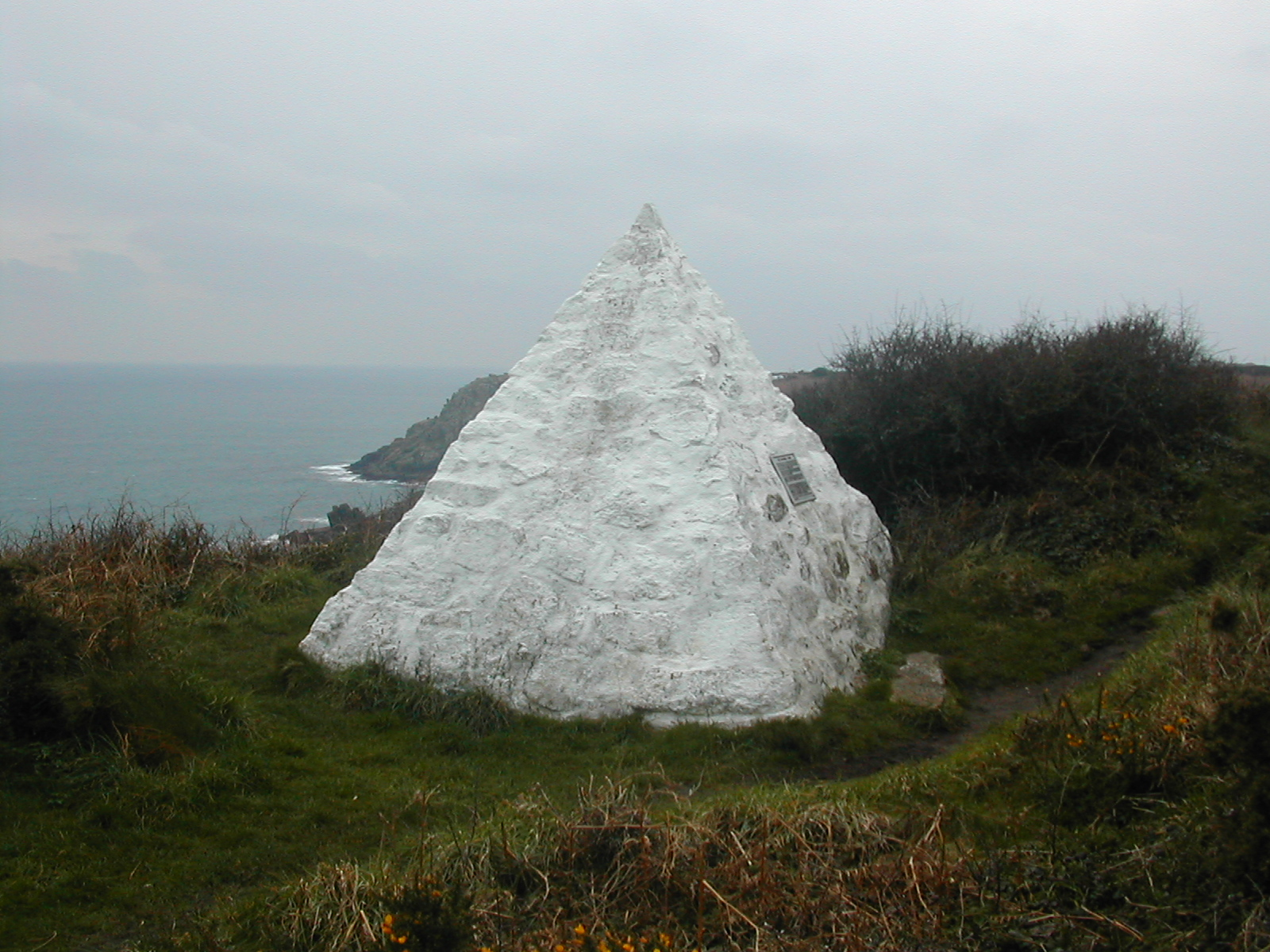
The white pyramid which replaced a clifftop hut near Porthcurno at which the submarine telegraph cable from Brest in France was terminated

In 1869, John Pender formed his first telegraph company, the Falmouth Gibraltar and Malta Telegraph Company, with the aim of completing the cable chain connecting India to England with cables via Gibraltar and Portugal. The company name was somewhat misleading as although Pender intended the cable to land at Falmouth, the final landing point was the more westerly Porthcurno, because of fears of shipping damaging the cables.

The completion of this cable in 1870 was the final link in the London to Bombay line. In 1872, this was one of the companies merged to form the Eastern Telegraph Company.

Established in 1872, the Eastern Telegraph Company was an amalgamation of a number of important smaller telegraph companies: John Pender, became the company's chairman, and Sir James Anderson, who had captained the Great Eastern on its successful laying of the 1866 Atlantic cable, was the general manager.

The company developed a network of telegraphs by creating new routes and doubling and trebling cables on busy existing routes. In the early years of the 20th century, the Eastern became part of the Eastern and Associated Telegraph Companies which incorporated many other telegraph companies from around the world.

Porthcurno's telegraphic code name was "PK". In 1929 the company began to operate world radio communications through a merger with Marconi's radio network and it was renamed Imperial and International Communications. In 1934 the name changed once again to Cable & Wireless. At its height, Porthcurno was the world's largest cable station, with fourteen telegraph cables in operation.

Although telegraphy itself is not generally regarded as mass media, as its communications are, in effect, on a one-to-one basis, the data and information that was transmitted through Porthcurno had both national and international importance. Wars were declared, announcements of deaths of royalty announced – these in turn were relayed to the national and local newspapers for the general public to absorb. Without telegraphy, there would have been little news in newspapers, and very little national and global content over the radio airwaves.

== Newspapers and magazines ==
=== History of Cornish newspapers ===
==== Royal Cornwall Gazette ====
The first newspaper printed and published in Cornwall was the Royal Cornwall Gazette, first published in 1801. It finally ceased publication in 1951, but formed the roots of today's Packet Newspapers. It was published in Falmouth by a Cornishman, Thomas Flindell. Flindell was born in Helston in 1767, and he had previously been editor of the Doncaster Gazette. Unfortunately, the newspaper got off to a rocky start—Flindell's business partners became bankrupt, and Flindell himself ended up in a debtors' jail in Bodmin. The last edition appeared on 16 October 1802. All was not lost however, as Cornish landowners got a group subscription together, and Flindell offered his services as publisher and printer. The paper re-appeared, published in Truro on 2 July 1803. Two years later it was sold to Nettletons, and Flindell moved to Exeter to set up another newspaper there. The newspaper was mainly subscribed by doctors, bankers, lawyers and landowners, but it was also made available publicly to inns and guest houses, a process which made it more amenable to advertisers.

Although the Royal Cornwall Gazette was the first newspaper published within Cornwall, another regional newspaper, which had many subscribers and distribution throughout Cornwall, as far west as Penzance, was the Dorset based Sherborne Mercury, which started in 1737, and predates the national Times. It covered many Cornish news items, and was read by key businessmen and members of the professional class in the county. Microfilm copies are available in the library at Kresen Kernow in Redruth.

Flindell purchased large numbers of postage stamps from a stationer Messrs Tipper & Fry of Aldgate in London. He wrote requesting more stamps at election time. Despite use of stamps for getting copies of the newspapers out to his subscribers, he also used a large body of couriers to get the paper down throughout the County of Cornwall. He negotiated with organisers of markets to sell his newspaper direct from stalls on market days. The Gazette, however, despite Flindell's best efforts, fell into the hands of the Tory Party. To counterbalance this, the prominent Whig Party in Truro set up The West Briton in 1810, which is still published today, although now under the ownership of Cornwall & Devon Media / Northcliffe Newspapers Group. Newspapers continued to expand across the county, both in number, size and readership.

The editor of the paper for eleven years (1863–1874) was the prominent West Country man of letters Charles Chorley.

==== Falmouth Packet ====
The next most prominent newspaper to start was the Falmouth Packet & Cornish Herald in 1829, which also still publishes today, though now under the Packet Newspapers banner, and under ownership of Newsquest.

==== Other current newspapers ====
Indeed, of all the current newspapers published within Cornwall, only one is independent, the St. Ives Times & Echo, which formed out of the merger of Western Echo and the St. Ives Times in 1957. All of the others are either owned by Tindle Newspaper Group, Newsquest or Northcliffe Newspapers Group. The geographical coverage of the existing papers is also haphazard, with a lot of duplication (for example, Callington is covered by the East Cornwall Times, The Cornish Times and the Cornish & Devon Post) while some areas (particularly North Cornwall/Bude) are poorly served (just the North Cornwall edition of the St Austell centric Cornish Guardian). There is an argument that Cornwall would be better served having at least one weekly paper which covers the entire county, as one of the main reasons for purchasing the weekly paper is by prospective property buyers and people buying and selling cars and job seekers. Indeed, The West Briton has gone some way to accommodate this; although there are four separate news editions of the paper, each week a classified/job vacancy section and a property section cover all of mid and west Cornwall, though places east of Bodmin, for no known reason, are generally excluded.

==== Newsagents ====
The final part of the chain in getting the newspaper from printer to the reader are the news wholesalers and the newsagents. Newsagents sprang up in Cornwall in the 1850s, but still continued to buy direct from the publisher. This generally meant a long delivery time from publication dates to shelf date, particularly for the national newspapers. However, by the 1870s both independent and national chains of news wholesaler started to make inroads into Cornwall. Currently, there are just two news wholesalers in the county, who distribute all newspapers and magazines to all outlets, from the village Post Office to the hypermarket. They are Smiths News, who are based in Plymouth, but have sub-branches in Bodmin and Redruth, and DashNews, which distributes Cornwall & Devon Media titles as well as News International newspapers.

==== Table of historic and current newspapers in Cornwall ====
Newspapers previously published in Cornwall^{publication dates in brackets excludes free newspapers}	Newspapers currently published in Cornwall _{year of 1st publication in brackets excludes free newspapers}
Royal Cornwall Gazette (1801–1951); Falmouth Packet & Cornish Herald (1829–1848); Penzance Gazette (1839–1858); Penzance Journal (1847–1850); Cornubian (1850–1925). Between (1867–1879) called the Redruth Times; Cornish Telegraph (1851–1915); Launceston Weekly News (1856–1931); Falmouth & Penryn Weekly Times (1861–1895). Continued as Cornish Echo until 1952. Redruth Independent (1879–1895); Cornish Post & Mining News (1889–1944); St. Austell Star (1889–1915); St. Ives Weekly Summary (1892–1918); Western Echo (1899–1957); Newquay Express (1905–1945); St. Ives Times (1910–1971); Newquay Voice (2002-2022); St. Austell Voice (2006-2022)	Cornish & Devon Post (1877); Cornish Guardian (1901); East Cornwall Times (1859); Packet Newspapers (1829); St. Ives Times & Echo (1972); The Cornish Times (1857); The Cornishman (1878); The West Briton (1810); Western Morning News (1860); The Voice (2022)

=== Social and economic effects ===
The rapid expansion of newspapers in Cornwall can be directly related to the boom in tin and copper mining throughout the county. Indeed, both the printed media and the mining industry fed off each other. However, growth was not all due to mining. Agriculture benefited too. By promoting livestock markets outside of a farmer's immediate area, it stimulated expansion of the rural economy. Looking at archive newspapers in Cornwall from the 1830s and 1840s, they are full of detail about markets, property, livestock farming equipment, mining equipment and prices for buying and selling tin and copper as well as other metals. Job vacancies were widely advertised, meaning that workers did not have to toil in their immediate village or town, This became especially important when the mining slump started in the 1880s. Jobs and opportunities were advertised from far-flung places like South Africa, Australia, Bolivia and Canada, where Cornish entrepreneurs had already started new mining operations using skills they had learnt back home.

Benefits of the newspapers were not solely limited to developing economic growth. It encouraged social networks by putting the Cornish people in touch with other villages and towns, as well as encouraging social meetings at summer fairs and agricultural shows (e.g. Royal Cornwall Show). The newspapers also became points of record for births, marriages, deaths and court calendars, prosecutions, bankruptcies and hangings.

Education benefited too. It encouraged people to read, and indeed stimulated people to learn to read. It also encouraged people to write, for example articles and letters. A gauge of literacy, or specifically the ability to sign one's name, is available from 1754 when both parties were required to sign marriage registers. By analysing five Cornish parishes indicates that approximately 24% of men and 70% of women could not sign their names between 1760 and 1770. However, by 1870 that figure had improved to 18% for men and 40% for women. Although it cannot be shown that this is a direct cause of the newspapers, there are writings (e.g. Andrew Brice writing in the Grand Gazetteer) to indicate that it was the considered opinion at the time.

After World War II, the effects of the importance of newspapers lessened. With the coming of television and the abundance of radio, its effect was less marked. Numbers of newspapers in Cornwall at that time declined, and several mergers occurred. In this technological period of growth, there is still a role for local newspapers in Cornwall, particularly as not all local newspaper content is available online.

=== Magazines ===
Magazines are a much newer media industry in Cornwall than all of the other media types, however, it is one which is starting to develop rapidly. One of the reasons for this is, due to improvements in IT, it is no longer necessary to be in a large city, like London to publish any magazine or written word. In addition, the relatively new University of Cornwall in the county is creating original media talent. Some of these newly qualified media students, having seen the benefits of Cornwall in their student years, do not want to leave at the end of their studies. An example of magazines include Stranger, a bi-monthly creative lifestyle magazine based in Falmouth. It focuses on the alternative, creative, and non-metrocentric side of British culture. Since its first local issue in October 2004, the magazine has grown to be distributed worldwide. Other magazines which are published in Cornwall, but have national or international distribution, and include out of County topics include the International Railway Journal, gasworld, a Truro-based magazine about the global industrial gas industry and Smallholder Magazine, which caters for small scale farming in the UK.

It was from Trencrom Hill in St Ives that the first issue of a Cornish magazine, the Cornish Review (editor: Denys Val Baker), was published in 1949. It ran until 1952, and offered Cornish writing on all aspects of the arts, including articles by Bernard Leach, R. Morton Nance, Peter Lanyon and Kenneth Hamilton Jenkin, as well as poetry by Charles Causley.

Cornish Review was followed by Cornish Scene, an A5 black & white quarterly, which covered Cornish history, as well as other topics including the arts. It ran from 1972 until the mid-1980s.

Since then, a number of magazines about Cornwall have been launched, including myCornwall (formerly Cornish World, established 1994), aimed at the Cornish diaspora, visitors and residents; Cornwall Today, a lifestyle magazine for residents and prospective residents; Taste Cornwall, covering food, food production and restaurants in the county; and the now-defunct Inside Cornwall, a listings magazine covering the arts, entertainment and sport.

It is the world of sport and specifically, water sports, which has seen and developed the third section of magazine growth in Cornwall. Surfing is key to Cornwall's tourism, and this has led to titles like Surf Girl magazine, Pitpilot magazine and Wavelength catering for this market. These titles not only cover surfing in Cornwall but the UK too, and in the case of Surf Girl, internationally. Another new title is Adventure Cornwall, which covers climbing and other outdoor pursuits.

== Cinema ==
One of the first records of presentations of movies was at Druids Hall in Redruth. In 1904, the Imperial Radioscope Company visited the hall with their animated pictures. In 1910 Druids Hall was converted into the Jenkin's Picturedrome and operated by Mr William Henry Jenkin. Excited audiences filled the hall and marvelled as moving images of Pearl White, Rudolph Valentino and later Charlie Chaplin flickered across the screen. The cinema had its own orchestra, which started in 1918. Parts of the building (which was converted to a bingo hall in 1954, and burnt down in 1984) still stand today in Penryn Street, and the interior of the ruins now house St Rumon's Gardens. A rival cinema, officially called the Electric Picture Palace but known locally as The Egg Pit (so called because the owner supplied eggs for the London market) set up in nearby Foundry Row in the late 1900s. This cinema closed in the late 1920s.

In nearby Camborne, Mr Burrow, a local photographer put on the very first public Bioscope show, with a nightly open air presentation in the Market Square in 1909.

In 1910, the Royal Cornwall Polytechnic Society in Falmouth started showing films in the Arts Centre.

Currently, Cornwall has cinemas in the following towns: Falmouth, Penzance, St Ives, Helston, Redruth (see image), Truro, Wadebridge, Padstow, and just outside Bude. The cinema in St Austell was closed and demolished in 2007, as part of the town's re-development. A new cinema has now opened there. This means that important places like Saltash and Liskeard currently have no cinemas. All of these places have previously had at least one cinema, and all have had several unsuccessful attempts to rebuild cinemas in these towns in recent years. None of the cinemas in Cornwall are owned by the big chains (like Vue). With the exception of the Rebel cinema near Bude, they are either operated by Merlin Cinemas or WTW cinemas, both local business concerns. Even the village of Delabole once had a cinema.

=== The Plaza, Truro ===
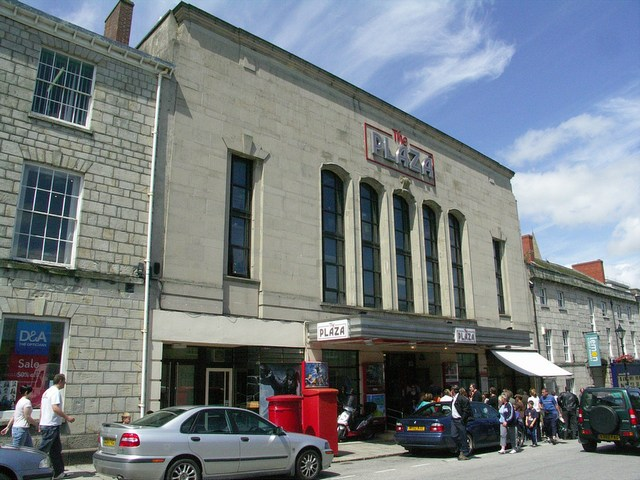
The Plaza in Truro

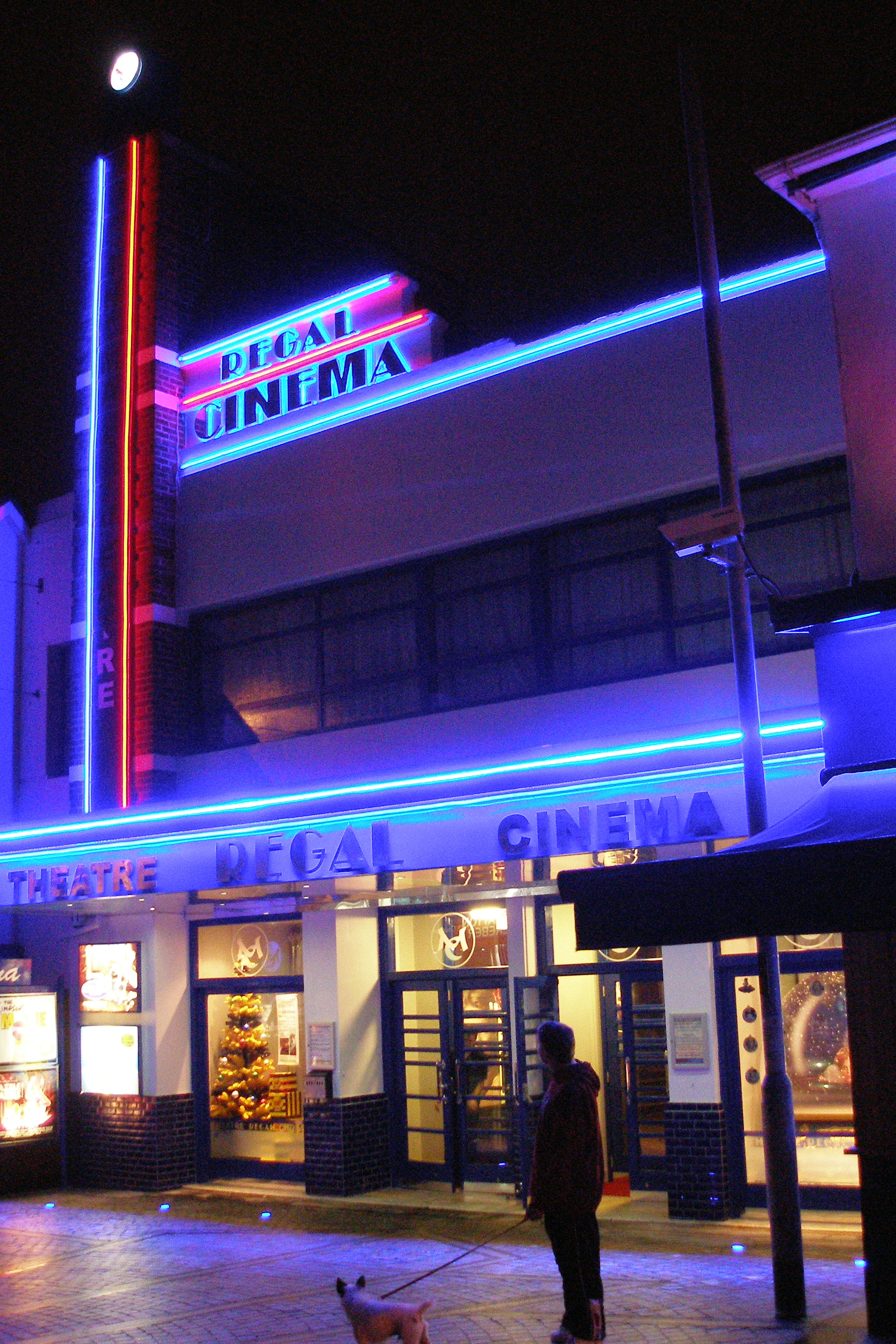
The Regal Cinema in Redruth

The Plaza Cinema on Truro's Lemon Street opened in 1938 and was the premier venue for film-goers at the time. It has changed hands many times and is now owned by WTW Cinemas, who purchased it in 1996. It was extensively refurbished in 1998, and now features four screens with air conditioning and the latest video and audio systems.

=== Regal Cinema, Redruth ===
Perhaps the finest cinema building in Cornwall, and possibly the South West, at the time of opening, the Regal Cinema in Redruth opened on 2 December 1935, with seating for 982 on a semi-stadium plan. It was opened by Mr Prance as part of Sound & Movement Cinemas. The original sound system was by British Thomson-Houston. In the 1960s the cinema was equipped with CinemaScope and stereophonic sound.

When the Cornwall Circuit Group of cinemas was taken over by The Rank Group, the cinema was later sold off to independent Vivian Bartle, and in 1983 the former café area was converted into an 80-seat screen 2. The auditorium was tripled in 1986 with seating for 600 front area (screen 3) and 172 (screen 2) & 121 (Screen 1) in the rear areas. It was taken over by Merlin Cinemas on 24 July 1998. Screen 3 has retained its stage facilities and allows the cinema to operate as the town's theatre when required. Screen 3 now has Dolby Digital Surround Sound. Screen 3 is also the largest screen and auditorium in Cornwall.

In August 2008 the exterior of the building was fully refurbished, including a new roof, with walls re-rendered and painted in blue with red stripes (The Regal's owners', Merlin Cinemas, branded colour scheme).

April 2011 saw another phase of redevelopment at the Regal with two screens going digital, screen 7 (a licensed auditorium with leather arm chairs) and screen 3 boasting Dolby 3D.

During 2012–13 the main auditorium, already the largest screen and auditorium in Cornwall, was subject to a £1.5 million transformation. Capacity increased to 650 and includes circle, stalls and box seats. To increase the number of screens from 4 to 6 the auditorium was partitioned, and two screens were placed underneath the circle. This was in addition to other work taken out on the other screens. All six screens were officially opened on 21 July 2013. All 6 screens are licensed for alcohol consumption.

=== Rebel Cinema, Poundstock Bude ===
This relatively new cinema is situated just off the Atlantic Highway, and opened on 11 August 1988. Originally, the cinema site was a garden centre and café, but was purchased by the Collard family in 1986 to convert it into a cinema, as the nearest cinema to Bude was over 30 miles away in Wadebridge. It was built and designed by the film producer, Mervyn Collard (who produced actor David Jason's first film, White Cargo. Mervyn died in 2004). Work started on the build at the end of 1987, and Westar 7000s projectors were installed, along with the carpets and seats and other fittings. The projectors were moved from the former Strand Cinema in Bideford, Devon. The architect was Martin Back.

The building frontage is in mock Greek style with a classical pediment, and two columns. The opening night film was a charity screening of Snow White and the Seven Dwarfs. Some changes have been made since opening, including the projectors now replaced with Cinemeccanica Victoria 9s, and the ticket office and foyer have been modified.

The Rebel was sold to Kaler Cinemas in 1991/1992 and subsequently sold to the Willis family in May 2000 who trade as Rebel Cinemas Limited to the present day. B A Willis has been involved in booking films for the Rebel Cinema since the early 1990s until taking over ownership and running in May 2000 in time for the opening of the film Saving Grace which was filmed locally in Cornwall at Port Isaac.

The Rebel closed in August 2007 and reopened in August 2011 after an ambitious transformation and complete refurbishment took place to bring the Rebel up to date with comfort, screen size and the latest digital sound formats which was all achieved commercially without grants, funding, or any other form of local or national subsidies so as to retain its position as a commercially run full-time cinema.

The Rebel Cinema is currently in the process of upgrading to Digital 3D projection and also the addition of a second screen with seating for 96 in the near future.

== Radio ==
=== Table of radio development ===
1st year of broadcasting in Cornwall	Stations on medium wave and long wave	Stations on FM	Stations on DAB & DRM	Stations on Freeview, Cable, and Satellite
1927	BBC National Programme (from Daventry)	–	–	–
1943	BBC Home Service (became BBC Radio 4 in 1967) (from Redruth MF – still broadcasting) (from Start Point in 1945 – ceased Start Point in 1978)	–	–	–
1945	BBC Light Programme (became BBC Radio 2 in 1967) (ceased broadcasting on MW in 1994) (from Start Point and Redruth MF)	–	–	–
1946	BBC Third Programme (became BBC Radio 3 in 1967) (ceased broadcasting on MW in 1994) (from Start Point and Redruth MF)	–	–	–
1956	–	BBC Radio 2/Light Programme, BBC Radio 3/Third Programme, BBC Radio 4/Home Service (all from North Hessary Tor)	–	–
1964	–	BBC Radio 2/Light Programme, BBC Radio 3/Third Programme, BBC Radio 4/Home Service (all from Four Lanes/Redruth)	–	–
1967	BBC Radio 1 (ceased broadcasting on MW in 1994)	–	–	–
1975	Plymouth Sound (South East Cornwall only) (until 1992)	Plymouth Sound (South East Cornwall only)	–	–
1978	BBC Radio 4 (including Morning Sou'West opt out) (from Plumer Barracks Transmitter, in Plymouth and Redruth MF)	–	–	–
1983	BBC Radio Cornwall	BBC Radio Cornwall	–	–
1987	–	BBC Radio 1 (from North Hessary Tor, Devon)	–	–
1989	Atlantic 252 (ceased broadcasting in 2002)	BBC Radio 1 (from Four Lanes/Redruth)	–	Cable Television available in PL12 postcode areas – includes selected commercial & BBC Radio stations
1990	BBC Radio 5 (became BBC Radio 5 Live in 1994)	–	–	–
1992	Plymouth Sound AM (South East Cornwall only) (ceased broadcasting in 2000)	Pirate FM, Classic FM	–	–
1993	–	–	–	BBC Radio (1, 4, 5 & World Service), launch in mono on the Astra satellite.
1996	Virgin Radio (launched on 30 April 1993 nationally) Talk Radio UK (launched on 14 February 1995 nationally, became Talksport in 2000)	–	–	–
2000	Classic Gold 1152 (South East Cornwall only)	–	Digital 1 Multiplex	–
2002	–	–	–	BBC Freeview Radio Services
2003	–	–	BBC National DAB (from Caradon Hill)	EMAP Radio services
2004	–	–	NOW Cornwall Multiplex (from Caradon and Redruth); BBC National DAB (from Four Lanes/Redruth)	–
2006	–	Atlantic FM (ceased 6 May 2012)	–	Virgin Radio, Talksport
2007	–	–	DRM BBC test broadcasts from Plumer Barracks, Plymouth broadcasting to Plymouth, South Hams and South East Cornwall.	
2008	–	Radio St Austell Bay Launched on 28 January	–	
2009	–	Source fm Launched on 27 February	–	–
2012	–	Heart FM (launched 7 May)	–	–
2016		Coast FM (Formerly Penwith Radio, launched 5 November)		

=== Background ===
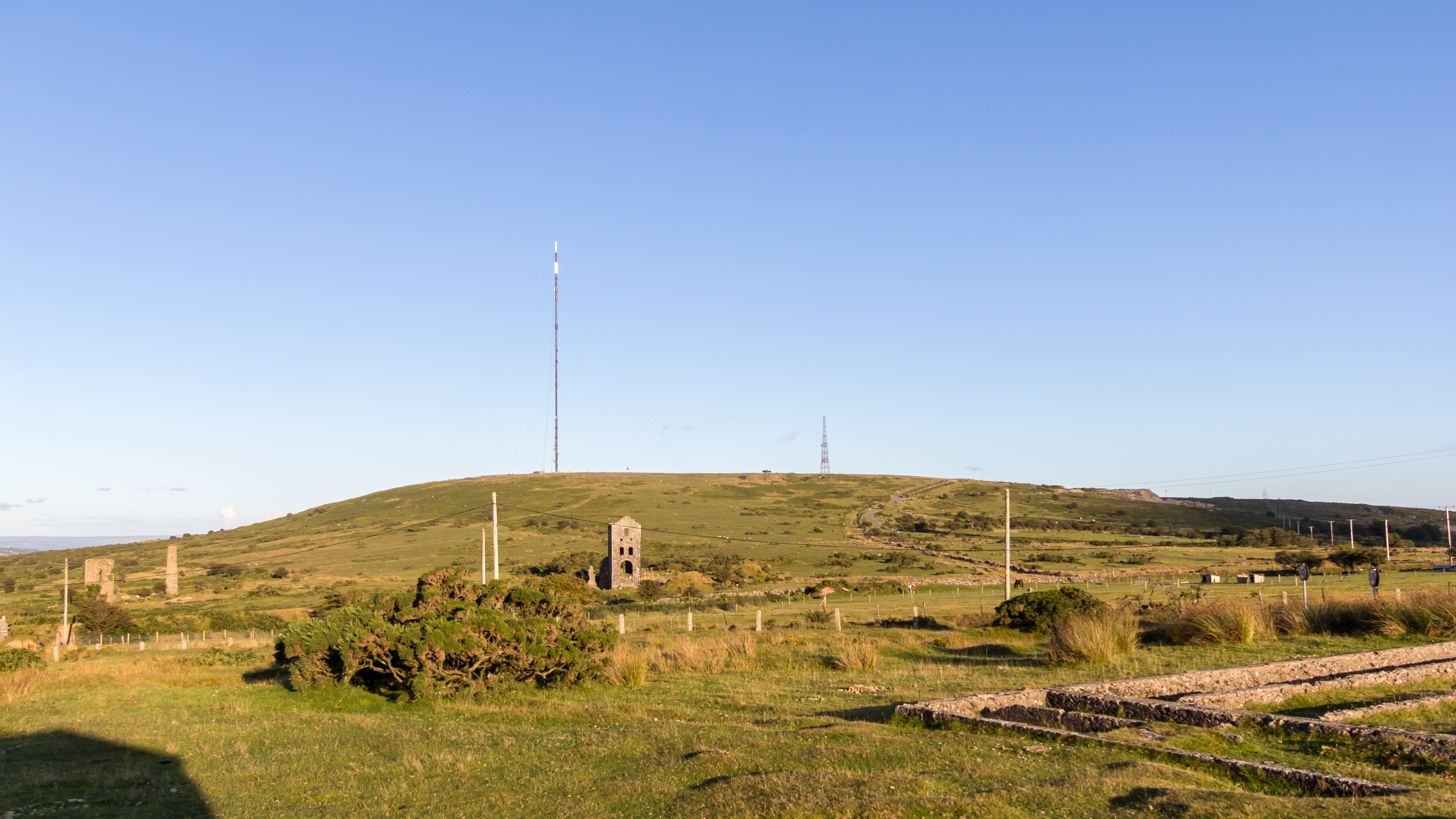
Caradon Hill mast and towers

It could be argued that radio was born in Cornwall. In 1901 at Poldhu on The Lizard, Guglielmo Marconi made his first trans-atlantic radio transmission. It would be another twenty six years before the BBC National Programme was audible in Cornwall, from the then new long wave transmitter at Daventry, although BBC transmissions began in 1922. The transmission, coming a long way from Cornwall, (from the centre of the English Midlands), was crackly and barely audible at night-time, and it was a solitary listening experience, as sets were only equipped with a single earpiece, and not a loudspeaker.

In 1933, the BBC started their BBC West Regional Programme (station ident: "5PY"). The main transmitter for this service was at Washford, near Minehead in Somerset. The intended transmitting area was the whole of the South West and South Wales, but the reception of this medium wave transmitter in Cornwall was generally poor, effectively blocked by Dartmoor and in the west of the county by Bodmin Moor.

It was to be another ten years before reception improved. In 1939, the BBC investigated using Start Point transmitting station in Devon to improve their coverage of radio in the South West. However, due to the outbreak of World War II, transmissions of the BBC Home Service did not start here until 1945. Another medium wave transmitter, Lanner/Redruth MF, in the west of the county, was built in 1943 by German POWs. This started transmissions of the BBC Home Service immediately, as unlike the transmitter at Start Point, it was felt that the signal could not be picked up by the Germans.

In 1945 the Light Programme was added to both the Start Point and Redruth transmitters, and in 1946, the Third Programme commenced broadcasting from these as well. In 1955, the BBC were looking to expand their 405 line television coverage. This resulted in the construction of the transmitter at North Hessary Tor on Dartmoor, Devon, which began transmitting FM radio signals for the Home, Light and Third Programme BBC stations in 1956. However, coverage of FM in Cornwall was only consistent in the east and south east of the county; it was barely receivable in the west of the county until the construction of the Four Lanes transmitter in 1964.

Despite moving the long wave Daventry transmissions to Droitwich, and increasing the transmitters power, long wave reception from the Midlands remained poor in Cornwall. To this day, BBC Radio 4 is not audible on long wave in most of Cornwall, and reception relies on a couple of low power repeater transmitters on medium wave (e.g. Lanner/Redruth MF on 756 kHz). Initially, the BBC National Programme replaced several local and regional services. However, although it launched BBC Regional Programme for the West in 1933, it transmitted it from the Washford transmitter. In the 1960s, it started an opt out from the then new BBC Radio 4 (formerly the BBC Home Service during the morning daily news programme (Today), called Morning Sou'West. This opt out continued, long after other regional services had ceased on the BBC (only National services for Wales, Scotland and Northern Ireland remained). However, the opt-out stopped with the long-overdue launch of BBC Radio Cornwall and BBC Radio Devon on 17 January 1983.

Commercial Radio had been expanding rapidly throughout the 1970s and early 1980s, starting with the launch of LBC in London, a news based service. Commercial Radio came to parts of Cornwall, mainly the south east of the county (approximately within thirty miles of Plymouth) with the launch of Plymouth Sound in 1975. This gave those listeners fortunate to hear it, pop music in stereo on FM for the first time. The two main FM transmitters for Cornwall, namely North Hessary Tor, which opened in 1956, and Four Lanes/Redruth, (which opened in 1964), although transmitting BBC Radio 2, were not yet stereo capable.

=== Commercial progress ===
It took until 1992 for Cornwall to get its first Commercial Radio station, long after most other counties and areas of the United Kingdom had had at least one heritage station. The reasons were complex, but at the heart were two factors; the relatively suppressed state of the Cornish economy and the large surface area but light population density of Cornwall itself. Despite this, on 22 August 1990, the soon to be UKRD Group formed Infinity Radio (an investment and radio consultancy company), and started work on a bid to the Radio Authority for the licence for Plymouth, West Devon, Cornwall and Isles of Scilly broadcasting area. Mike Powell, formerly Programme Controller with County Sound was the leading light behind Infinity. Another investor was Penzance insurance broker William Rogers.

There were eight bids for the licence, including one from Plymouth Sound's owners, GWR group (now Global Radio). The Plymouth Sound Company's bid wanted to run the Cornish service as an opt out from their main service to the Plymouth Area, on a similar model like they had done for their (unsuccessful) Tavistock opt-out. Infinity's model was much bolder – an eighteen-hour-a-day operation based in studios in the heart of Cornwall, with additional studios and offices in Plymouth.

Infinity won, and Pirate FM launched to 590,000 potential listeners on 3 April 1992, broadcasting from new studios in an industrial estate in Redruth, with subsidiary studios at the Foot & Bowden building in Plymouth. It transmitted from the Four Lanes/Redruth mast and the Caradon Hill transmitting station, with both transmitters having separate data feeds, to allow for more localised advertising. It used, at the time, a state of the art music play-out system, and bought in jingles from JAM Creative Productions in Texas, USA. Pirate FM was commercially successful, and enabled its owners to expand the UKRD Group to purchase other radio stations across the UK.

In 1997, Cornwall's first RSL came on air. Broadcasting to Truro and mid-Cornwall, from a caravan next to the A390 road, Live 105 played a mixture of Dance and Rock, and was a first for radio in Cornwall. However, at that time, the demographic and geographical mix did not work. To assist with the sailing festival in Falmouth, the owners of Packet Newspapers, set up Tall Ships FM in 1998, and followed it again with Packet FM (broadcasting from studios at Falmouth College of Art) in 2004. Redruth School (a Technology College) set up an RSL in 2000 called Red Youth Radio. It continued for a further two years, and rebranded as Airwaves 105. Two other RSLs were to set the background for the bidding war for Cornwall's second ILR radio station, Malibu Surf FM and CK-FM. CK-FM (Cornwall/Kernow FM) was set up by John Grierson, and transmitted to the Camborne, Pool and Redruth area during the summer of 2001. It aired a mixture of news, topical discussion and highlighted business ventures in West Cornwall. It was somewhat similar in style to BBC Radio Cornwall, but offered a viable alternative. During the 1990s, surfing took off in a big way in Newquay, and it became the home of the Malibu Surf Championships. Malibu Surf FM was set up in 1999 to transmit a mixture of surfing news, music and competition commentaries to locals and surf visitors. It continued for several subsequent years, until 2005. Both CK-FM and Malibu Surf FM bidded with six other applicants (Itchy FM, Extreme Radio, Kernow FM, St. Piran FM SouWest FM and Time FM were the others) for the new OFCOM awarded licence for Cornwall. After a much more competitive battle compared to Pirate FM's bid, Atlantic Broadcasting Ltd (Malibu Surf FMs bid) won in early 2005, and started broadcasting in the summer of 2006 with a format mixing music with a minimum of 30% speech during weekday daytime. During its start-up period the station had a high turnover of presenters. However, it is starting to build a base and the RAJAR figures now exceed monthly reach of 100,000 listeners, with weekly share of listening in Cornwall up from 2% to 3.9% by late 2007.

A new station on the Isles of Scilly, Radio Scilly, opened in late 2007, broadcasting on FM. The radio station launched at 2 pm on 3 September 2007. It claims to be the world's smallest radio station. A community radio station to facilitate the county's largest urban area, St Austell, was launched as Radio St Austell Bay at 7 am on 28 January 2008.

=== DAB, DRM and other transmissions ===
DAB started being tested by the BBC in the London area in 1990, and was rolled out fully in 1995. At that time, DAB radio sets were confined to Hi-Fi Tuner separates, and were comparatively expensive (around GBP 800).

In 1999, Digital One started a very rapid roll out of DAB multiplexed enabled transmitters. Both Caradon Hill and Four Lanes/Redruth were converted to transmit DAB signals for the first time in 2000. This enabled DAB to be heard for the first time in Cornwall, although due to the still scarcity of sets, not many listeners were tuning in on launch day. That all changed in 2002, when Pure launched their Evoke 1 set at £100, by far the cheapest at that time. Other manufactures followed, and the price by 2004 had gone below the £50 mark, enabling a much greater consumer take up. However, DAB signal reception within Cornwall remained patchy, and was (and at 2007 still is) virtually non-existent in areas like Falmouth. The BBC did not come to DAB in Cornwall until 2003, three years behind the commercial rival, and even then this was broadcasting to mid and east Cornwall only, as Redruth was not DAB enabled by the BBC until late in 2004.

While offering listeners a much greater choice of stations and programming than previous, DAB did not offer Cornwall any extra local offering, as was hoped. Costs of launching a DAB only station on the two non-BBC multiplexes was very expensive for any would-be community broadcasters, and when the NOW Cornwall Multiplex launched on the two main transmitters in Cornwall in 2004, it only relayed existing local FM stations, with the addition of DAB Networked Stations {e.g. XFM, Chill). The NOW Cornwall Multiplex however meant that Plymouth Sound, previously only audible in South East Cornwall, could be heard across most of Cornwall for the first time.

DRM is broadcast using the existing medium wave and long wave transmitters, but utilising advanced digital technology. In 2007, by utilising the previous medium wave frequency of BBC Radio Devon for the Plymouth area, the BBC have begun transmitting DRM signals to Plymouth, South East Cornwall and parts of the South Hams. Volunteers from each of these areas have been equipped with DRM sets, and to try out the robustness of this new technology.

Both before and since DAB launched, other mediums of transmitting and listening to the radio have expanded. In 1989, cable television subscribers in the Saltash area could hear some BBC Radio stations on their television sets for the first time. With the expansion of digital cable television, many more radio stations have been added. With the expansion of satellite television too, many stations, including others from the European continent and beyond are available. The BBC added radio to UK Gold in 1993 on the Astra satellite, and subsequent satellites and services have been extended since then. The expansion of Freeview, and its subsequent replacement in Cornwall in 2009 of existing analogue television services is perhaps going to have the greatest impact. The internet, with thousands of radio stations streaming online, and the expansion of broadband has meant that radio reception has diversified in the number of stations that can be heard, and it is no longer restricted to crackles and night time fading of a few stations of old.

On 6 July 2007, OFCOM announced that Channel 4 Radio had won the licence to operate the second national commercial DAB multiplex. However, Channel 4 Radio subsequently announced that they would invest a large amount of money in new transmitters, but that there would be no coverage for the new service in Cornwall (except, perhaps the far South East, as Plymouth will be covered) due to potential interference with stations in Republic of Ireland.

=== Social and technological referencing ===
Throughout radio's development, like with newspapers, there has been a technological delay of progress in the county. Despite being with radio at the outset on The Lizard, Cornwall's geography and economy have conspired against it. For example, Virgin Radio replaced BBC Radio 3 on the 1215 kHz frequency in 1992/1993, but the medium wave transmitters remained silent in Cornwall on this frequency until 1996, a full three years after Virgin Radio's national launch.

Cornwall's current local radio output does not tap into the rich vein of cultural talent that Cornwall has to offer. Only very few programmes relate to Cornwall's history and cultural identity. For example, on BBC Radio Cornwall, the Cornwall Connected programme, connects with the many Cornish who live worldwide, and David White's programme on unsigned bands, but these remain isolated examples. Most of the rest on the three local stations (BBC Radio Cornwall, Pirate FM and Atlantic FM) is chart pop music or golden oldies, travel, weather and news. In some parts of Cornwall other Celtic radio stations can sometimes (atmospheric reception dependent) be received on FM. The BBC's own BBC Radio Wales has its own Celtic music programme, which features Cornish, Scottish, Irish and Welsh folk music. Other stations, like RTÉ lyric fm and RTÉ Raidió na Gaeltachta play Celtic music, and other talk stations from the Republic of Ireland, like Newstalk, feature history and social issues in depth.

There is no radio outlet in Cornwall for writers of plays and radio drama, nor outlets for comedians, and very little live music from local bands (only promotional CDs tend to be aired). There are also very few local documentaries about Cornwall social and economic issues in depth.

== Television ==
=== BBC Television ===
Television came to Cornwall in 1956 with the opening of the new transmitter at North Hessary Tor. Construction of this transmitter began in 1955, and it gave 405 line black & white (as well as FM radio – see radio section above) coverage of television signals to many (but not all) new viewers in Cornwall for the first time when it went on air in 1956.

The only station on air was BBC Television, as it was to be five years before commercial television went on air. All programmes came from Alexandra Palace, and were relayed to North Hessary Tor via Crystal Palace in London, and there was no local or regional element to either news programming or general programmes.

BBC Regional Television did not start in Cornwall until the BBC news studios were completed in Seymour Road, Plymouth in 1961.

Originally called simply 'BBC South West', this was a simple news opt out around the main tea time news. However, in 1963, the long-standing Spotlight television programme started. Many future television presenters cut their teeth on this still running programme, including Kate Adie, Sue Lawley, Angela Rippon, Fern Britton, Juliet Morris, Jill Dando and Hugh Scully. Many of the current presenters have Cornish connections: Natalie Cornah, who was born in Newquay, Justin Leigh, who formerly presented on BBC Radio Cornwall, Rebecca Wills who was born in Helston and Andy Breare, who used to present on Pirate FM.

As well as having some Cornish influenced presenters, the Spotlight news team also have a news studio in Truro, which is situated inside the BBC Radio Cornwall complex. The two news teams work closely together, to ensure news coverage is thorough across the county on the Spotlight programme.

The BBC has never made as many regional programmes as commercial television in the South West. The only other regional programme on air in 2007 is the national weekend The Politics Show, which has a South West opt-out. Despite this, this opt-out has covered such Cornwall important topics like affordability of housing, farming and fishing issues and articles about the future of tourism.

Regional opt-outs are now on BBC One only; however for a time in the 1980s and 1990s, opt outs for some regional programming and south west news (mainly day time) were on BBC Two as well.

=== Commercial television ===
Commercial television could be received in Cornwall from 1961, with the combined launches of Westward Television and the Caradon Hill transmitting station. There was an additional transmitter at Stockland Hill, but this covered the east of Westward's region, namely east Devon, west Dorset and south Somerset. Only the Caradon Hill transmitter covered Cornwall, which meant that reception was virtually non-existent in the West of the county, until the Redruth transmitting station was built in 1964.

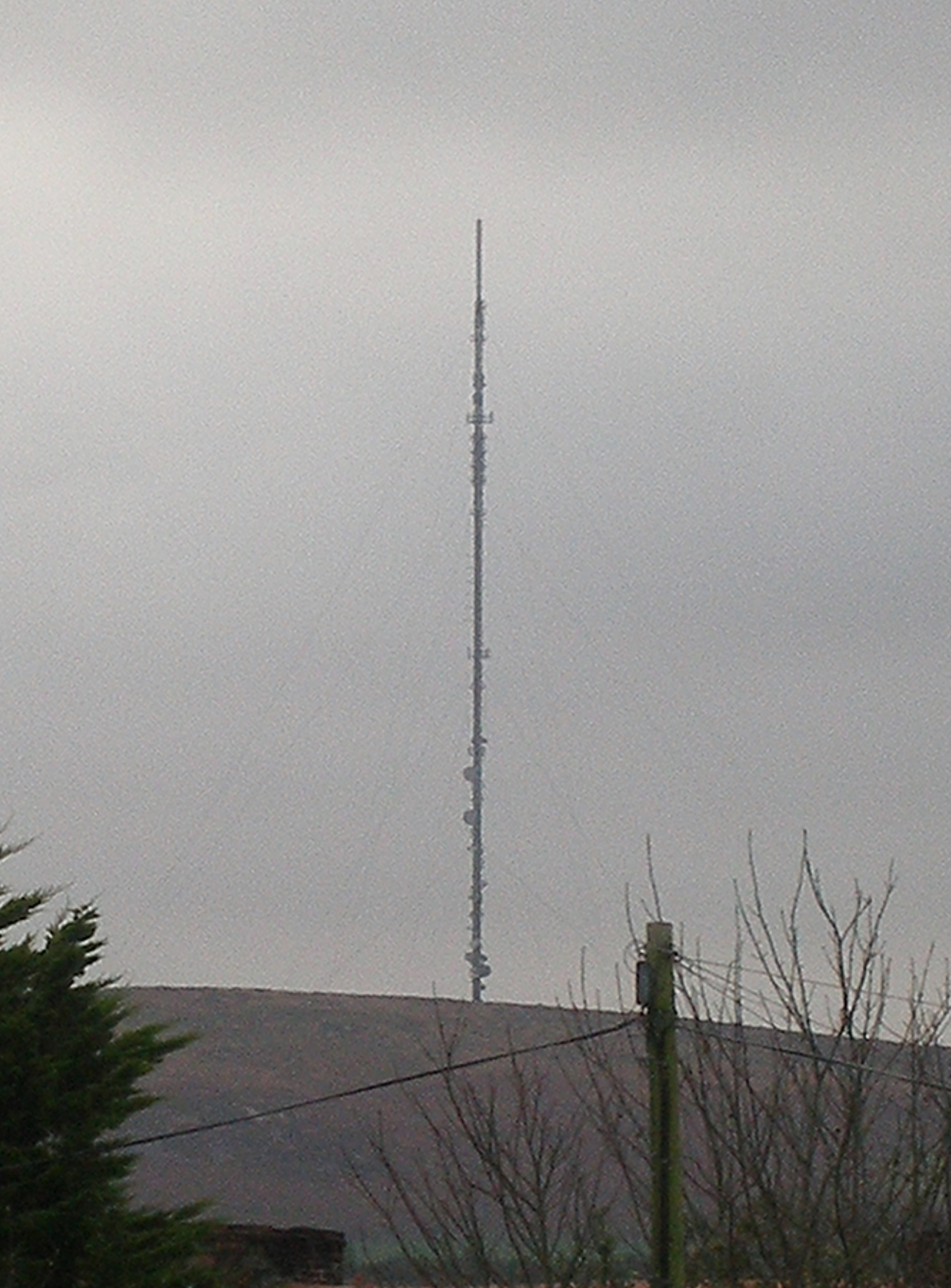
The main transmitter for mid and west Cornwall. It now carries FM, analogue TV, DVB, and DAB. It is situated near the village of Four Lanes, about 2 miles south of Redruth.

Transmissions used the 405 line black and white analogue system. Initially, content tended to be biased towards Plymouth, as the news and programme making studios were based at Derry's Cross, and Electronic News Gathering facilities were decades away.

Despite this, those viewers in Cornwall who could receive a signal, the Westward service was a success, as it gave a different, and in some ways, lighter and friendlier media perspective from the BBC's television alternative. Westward were soon keen to distant itself from its near neighbour and part rival, TWW and purchased white Volvos to capture filmed news items. Most of the regional companies found it difficult to capture and show news from the far flung corners of their regions.

However Westward introduced a regional news slot after the ITV News at Ten national news programme, to enable film to be shipped back to Derry's Cross, be developed, edited and shown all on the same day: this was a first for any ITV station.

Continuity announcers were not just confined to the studios either. They appeared at village fêtes and town fairs across Cornwall and the Westward region, and soon the station started to build up a loyal following. Although Westward made few programmes for the ITV Network, it produced many regional programmes which covered topics specific to Cornwall, including The Farming Programme and Look Westward as well as features, like walking the South West Coast Path. By 1969, Westward had more than 100 correspondents across the region informing Westward of newsworthy local events and eight film cameramen who would travel the region gathering news.

Daphne du Maurier was chosen by Peter Cadbury, as a famous Cornish resident to be on the Westward board of directors. The Peter Cadbury made several enemies with the Independent Broadcasting Authority and also with high-profile community leaders. With financial troubles besetting the company, Westward lost the franchise in 1981, to be replaced by Television South West (TSW) (going on air on New Year's Day 1982), who inherited all the staff and the studios.

TSW were a far more professional company than Westward, and even made relatively high-brow programmes for their region; in the arts world, they had some big names who worked with them, including Saltash born Moura Lympany, who was one of Britain's leading concert pianists at the time, potter Bernard Leach, and St Ives sculptor Barbara Hepworth.

Westcountry Television, another independent company, replaced Television South West at 00:00 GMT on 1 January 1993. The first programme aired on the channel was a video welcoming viewers to Westcountry and promising higher levels of regional commitment. Later, Westcountry was purchased by Carlton Television, and it is now simply part of the ITV Network. However, since that original commitment to regional programming in 1993 (and approximately 16 hours of regional programmes per week), in 2007 this had been reduced to less than seven hours per week. There is no longer any mention of Westcountry on the ITV network in Cornwall, except for a vague verbal mention before a local programme is shown. Despite this, Westcountry Television has remained committed to Cornwall since launch, and have two small news studios in the county at Truro and Penzance. There is also a five-minute opt-out, broadcast from Redruth transmitting station of news stories specific to the west of the ITV Westcountry region (there are three others, based in Barnstaple, Plymouth and Exeter.) It does mean though that those viewers in the east of the county receive news aimed at Plymouth City and the South Hams areas, as the Caradon Hill transmitting station covers Plymouth and Mid and South Devon as well as east Cornwall.

In the Westward and TSW days, it was fairly common to see Cornish businesses advertise on commercial television, both of the 35mm slide voice-over advertisement type, and of full video or filmed productions lasting 30 seconds or more. Advertisers included coal merchants, car dealers, department stores, garden centres, theme or tourist parks and solicitors. However, the number and frequency of Cornish advertisers on ITV Westcountry although not eliminated, are far less frequent in number.

Current regional programmes include John Nettles' Westcountry, Country Ways and Coastal Ways, all independent productions, but all including some Cornish content (for example, an episode of the John Nettles programme was about the Cornish China clay industry, and Coastal Ways, which has covered many Cornish resorts, including St. Ives).

=== National commercial programmes produced in Cornwall ===
Despite very few programmes being produced by Westward, TSW or Westcountry/ITV Westcountry over the years for the ITV Network since the mid-1990s, there has been a surge of interest in independent film makers making programmes set in Cornwall. In recent years all of the following have been made in Cornwall and shown on the ITV Network:

- Wycliffe (1993–1998)
- Doc Martin (2004–Present)
- Moving Wallpaper/Echo Beach (2007)

In addition, Wild West starring Dawn French and Catherine Tate was made and filmed in Portloe, and shown on BBC One.

=== General and future developments ===
Unlike radio, television did not have its roots in Cornwall, however 1962 was a landmark year in British Television. A facility in Cornwall, the Goonhilly Satellite Earth Station, linked with Telstar and received the first live transatlantic television broadcasts from the United States. The facility continued to be used to transmit global pictured from around the world to viewers in the UK. Unfortunately, the facility will be closed in 2008.

Although satellite television was gradually available throughout the 1980s, it was only available to owners of large dishes and the channels were intended to supply cable networks across Europe and domestic reception was not the prime audience. In 1989, Sky Television plc's direct-to-home four channel service started (now Sky Digital) and was followed by the launch of BSB in 1990.

In 1982, Channel 4 was launched across the United Kingdom. However, Channel 4 did not arrive in Cornwall until 1983 on the two main television transmitting stations (Redruth (Four Lanes) & Caradon Hill) in the county.

In 1989, Cable Television arrived in Cornwall, or at least to Saltash, and the immediate surrounding areas. Initially, this was an analogue service, but it is now part of Virgin Media. It does not offer any Cornish or regional programming, unlike some of the early cable television schemes in the UK.

In 1997, Five, the last national terrestrial station to launch in the UK, came to some of Cornwall from the first day of the station's transmission to the Redruth coverage area (serving the west of the county), although at much lower power than the other 4 channels. Channel Five is not broadcast on Caradon Hill (serving the east of the county) or some of the television relay transmitters in Cornwall, and also broadcasts on the main transmitters on lower power than the four other main analogue terrestrial channels.

Both Channel Four and Channel Five are part of the Freeview digital offering, again available from the two main transmitters, since ONdigital's launch in 1998. None of the relays in Cornwall carry Freeview. However, this will change when Cornwall has its analogue television transmitters switched off in the summer of 2009.

In 2005, ITV launched ITV Local, a broadband news and information service. This service launched in the Westcountry area in October 2007.

Also in 2007, ITV said that they intended to merge ITV West with ITV Westcountry, and close the studios at Plymouth, running the news operation from Bristol. This was met with considerable opposition from business leaders and councils.

== Internet ==
Although Cornwall is remote and residential broadband is less common than in other parts of the UK it houses one of the world's fastest high-speed transatlantic fibre optic cables, making Cornwall an important hub within Europe's Internet infrastructure.
