= F. E. Halliday =

20th-century English academic and author

- Born: 10 February 1903; Bradford, West Yorkshire, UK
- Died: 26 March 1982 (aged 79)
- Occupations: Academic; author; painter
- Known for: Books on William Shakespeare

Academic background
- Education: King's College, Cambridge (M.A.)

Frank Ernest Halliday (10 February 1903 – 26 March 1982) was an English academic, author and amateur painter. He wrote on a wide range of subjects, though he was best known for his books on William Shakespeare.

== Biography ==
F. E. Halliday — he preferred use of his initials for his books and public life — was born in Bradford, Yorkshire, and educated at King's College, Cambridge, where he earned his M.A. in 1928.

Halliday taught English and history at Cheltenham College, and served as head of the English Department there, from 1929 to 1948. After his retirement from teaching, he and his family moved to St Ives, Cornwall, where Halliday pursued a second career as a professional author. He produced a modern edition of Richard Carew's The Survey of Cornwall in 1953. He wrote or edited more than 20 books in his lifetime, including a volume of poetry, Meditation at Bolerium (1963). His compendium A Shakespeare Companion was a basic reference work for a generation of readers. First published in 1950, the book went through a major revision and updating for a new edition in 1964, the quatercentenary of Shakespeare's birth.

Halliday was active in civic life in St Ives. He was a member of Penwith Society of Arts, was a governor of the local secondary school, and joined Barbara Hepworth in opposing plans to turn the Island, St Ives' headland, into a car park. When he turned 70 in 1973, the St Ives Times & Echo said he had done "as much as, if not more than, any native Cornishman towards protecting, preserving and improving" the town.

His 1936 portrait of Cecil Day-Lewis is in the collection of the National Portrait Gallery.

He married Nancibel Beth Gaunt in 1927; they had one child, a son, Michael.

Halliday died on 26 March 1982.

== Selected written works by F. E. Halliday ==
- Shakespeare and His Critics (1949)
- The Enjoyment of Shakespeare (1952)
- Shakespeare in his Age (1956)
- The Cult of Shakespeare (1957)
- A History of Cornwall (1959)
- Indifferent Honest (1960), an autobiography
- The Life of Shakespeare (1961)
- Unfamiliar Shakespeare (1962)
- England, a Concise History (1964), revised 1980 (and posthumously, 1989, 1995)
- The Poetry of Shakespeare's Plays (1964)
- An Illustrated Cultural History of England (1967), revised up to 1981
- Chaucer and His World (1968)
- Doctor Johnson and His World (1968)
- Wordsworth and His World (1970)
- Thomas Hardy: His Life and Work (1972)
- The Excellency of the English Tongue (1975)
- Robert Browning: His Life and Work (1975)
