= Taz Knight =

Tasman Knight, known as Taz Knight, is a British pro surfer, winner of numerous UK competitive surfing titles in club, regional and National junior contests from 2006-2014 including several British titles in individual and team competitions. He won the UK Pro Surf Association (UKPSA) u-18 rankings in 2013, and represented Team GB at 3 ISA world junior championships (WJC). In 2014 he was honoured as GB team Captain for the WJC in Ecuador.

== Early years ==
Born in 1996 at Townsville, Queensland, during a passage on a small sailboat from New Zealand, via Australia to Indonesia Taz was named after the famous Dutch explorer Abel Tasman, who discovered Tasmania, and gave his name to the Tasman Sea.

Brought up in North Devon, UK, Taz lived close to the hollow beach break at Croyde, at the heart of a coastline littered with long point breaks and craggy reefs. Local surfing legends at Croyde and it's Surf Club such as Ralph Freeman and Andrew Cotton inspired him. Aged 8, he spent a year travelling with his family through Mexico and Central America. During his teens, camping out for weeks at a time at Easkey in North West Ireland, he was exposed to harsh conditions and powerful waves, an experience that was to lay the foundations for his growing reputation as one of the most fearless of UK grommets.

== Career ==
=== Junior career ===
An 11-year-old surfing the notorious reef at Porthleven in a white Gath crash helmet, captured the imagination of the surfing press. Pitpilot magazine published photographs and article about the up & coming grommet. The publicity led to sponsorship from West Wetsuits, and Taz was taken under the wing of British surfer & shaper Nigel Semmens contest results soon followed, and numerous opportunities to travel; with the attendant news & photo coverage in the surfing press. Increasingly local and even national mainstream news picked up on the adventures, leading to further sponsorships from Quiksilver, and a place amongst the top-ranked Juniors in the UK for the remainder of his Junior career.

=== Professional career ===
Emerging from an 8-year career in the top echelon of British Junior surfing Taz was spotted by Watersports equipment manufacturer ION and changing robe specialist Dryrobe and remained on the team at NS Surfboards. He continued to work for his sponsors whilst travelling the world in search of the perfect wave. In 2015 he travelled from California to Mexico surfing some of the most renowned big wave spots on the planet including Mavericks, Todos Santos and Puerto Escondido, and he was on the team supporting Andrew Cotton in his quest to pioneer an offshore reef off the coast of Ireland in 2016.

A severe skating injury in late 2016 resulted in an enforced break from competitive surfing, but a long period of rehabilitation culminated in his return to the big wave surfing world in 2019

=== Academic career ===
Taz finished his B.Sc. in physics with first class honours from Bristol university.
