= The Voice (Cornwall newspaper) =

United Kingdom newspaper series

- Type: Weekly newspaper
- Owner(s): Tindle
- Founded: 2001; 24 years ago (as the Newquay Voice)
- Headquarters: Webb's House, Liskeard, Cornwall
- Website: voicenewspapers.co.uk

The Voice is a newspaper in Cornwall that previously operated as a series of newspapers. In 2022, the Voice had eight editions covering Bodmin, Camborne & Redruth, Liskeard, Newquay, Penzance, Saltash, St Austell, and Truro.

== History ==
The Newquay Voice was founded in 2001, with its sister publication the St Austell Voice following in 2006. The Newquay Voice covered the north half of the former Borough of Restormel, while the St Austell Voice covered the south. The Newquay Voice and the St Austell Voice were acquired by Peter Masters in 2020, who opened an additional six Voice publications in other Cornwall towns. In 2022, the Voice newspapers were purchased by Tindle Newspapers, owner of The Cornish Times.

== See also ==
- Media in Cornwall#Newspapers and magazines
