= Tramways in Plymouth =

Plymouth
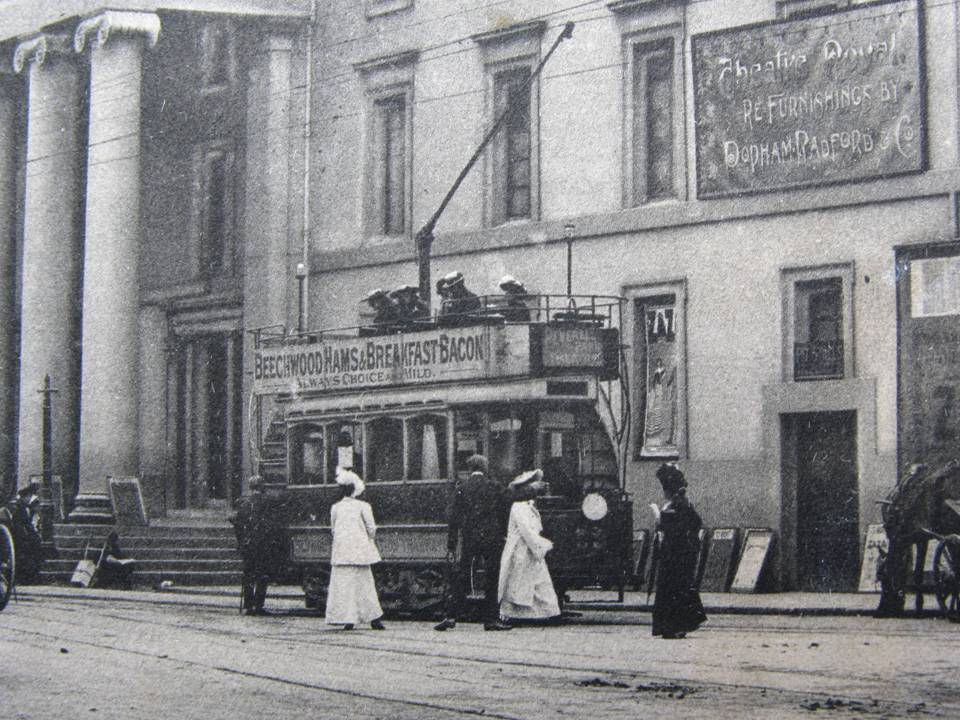
- A Plymouth Corporation tram at the Theatre

Operation
- Locale: Plymouth, Devon
- Open: 1872
- Close: 1945
- Owner: Plymouth Corporation

Infrastructure
- Track gauge: 3 ft 6 in (1,067 mm)
- Propulsion system(s): Horse, later electric
- Depot(s): Milehouse

Statistics
- Route length: 17.57 miles (28.28 km)
Plymouth Tramways era: 1886–1907
Track gauge	3 ft 6 in (1,067 mm)
Propulsion system	horse
Depot(s)	Millbay, Mutley
Plymouth, Stonehouse and Devonport era: 1872–1922
Track gauge	4 ft 8 1/2 in (1,435 mm)
Propulsion system	horse
Depot(s)	Stonehouse
Plymouth, Stonehouse and Devonport era: 1901–1922
Track gauge	3 ft 6 in (1,067 mm)
Propulsion system	electric
Depot(s)	Stonehouse
Devonport and District Tramways era: 1901–1915
Track gauge	3 ft 6 in (1,067 mm)
Propulsion system	electric
Depot(s)	Milehouse
Route length	9.2 miles (14.8 km)

The tramways in Plymouth were originally constructed as four independent networks operated by three different companies to serve the adjacent towns of Plymouth, Stonehouse and Devonport in Devon, England. The merger of the 'Three Towns' into the new borough of Plymouth in 1914 was the catalyst for the three companies to join up under the auspices of the new Plymouth Corporation. The network was closed in 1945, partly as a result of bomb damage during World War II.

The earliest of the three companies, the Plymouth, Stonehouse and Devonport Tramway, was the first tramway in the United Kingdom to be constructed under the provisions of the Tramways Act 1870 (33 & 34 Vict. c. 78). Initially a 4 ft 8 1/2 in (1,435 mm) gauge horse-worked line, it was later converted to 3 ft 6 in (1,067 mm) gauge and electric power. The second was the Plymouth, Devonport and District Tramway (later the Plymouth Tramways Company), which was built to 3 feet 6 inch gauge and used both steam and horse power before electrification. The final company was the Devonport and District Tramway which also adopted the 3 feet 6 inch gauge but was electrified from the outset.

== History ==
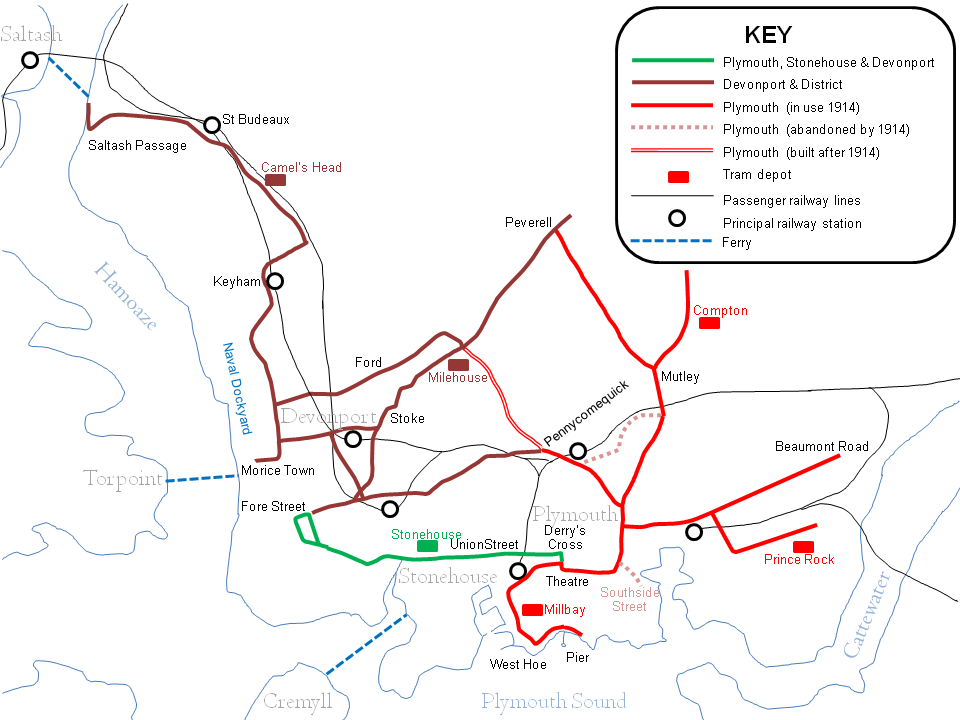
Tramways in Plymouth, showing the Stonehouse (green), Plymouth Corporation (red), and Devonport (brown) routes.

Plymouth grew up around a natural harbour on the eastern side of the promontory now known as Plymouth Hoe, on the south Devon coast. Naval dockyards were established at Plymouth Dock (later known as Devonport), facing across the River Tamar to the north west of Plymouth; Stonehouse was sandwiched between the two and became the home for military barracks, hospitals and the Royal William Victualling Yard.

The South Devon Railway arrived at Plymouth in 1848 and a permanent station was established at Millbay the following year. This was on the western side of Plymouth Hoe and a new commercial dock was established on the shore opposite the station. Immediately north of the station the railway crossed Union Street on a viaduct. This was a road which had been built to link the centres of the Three Towns. The Cornwall Railway opened another line from Millbay through Devonport in 1859.

=== Plymouth, Devonport and Stonehouse ===
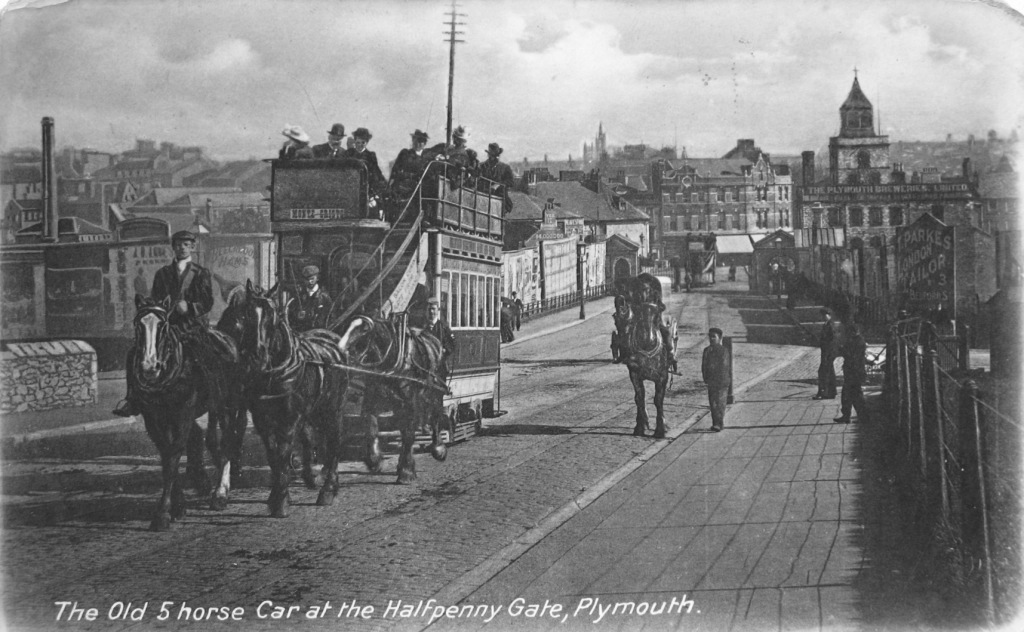
A horse tram leaving Stonehouse for Devonport

The Tramways Act 1870 (33 & 34 Vict. c. 78) was passed to enable the easier construction of street tramways, and the company promoting the line through Stonehouse was the first to take advantage of it. The tramway was opened on 18 March 1872. Starting from Derry's Clock by the Theatre Royal in Plymouth, it ran along Union Street and passed under the railway viaduct before entering Stonehouse. It then crossed over the "Halfpenny Bridge" (a toll bridge across a tidal creek) and entered Devonport. After climbing Devonport Hill it terminated at Cumberland Street. Two years later the line was extended beyond Cumberland Street along Chapel Street, Fore Street and Marlborough Street. This was a loop on which trams ran in an anti-clockwise direction.

The Stonehouse line was the only one in Plymouth to be built to the British 4 ft 8 1/2 in (1,435 mm) standard gauge. Its trams were hauled by horses; two worked right through from Plymouth to Devonport but an additional pair were added to help across Stonehouse Bridge and one or two more were added to these for the journey up Devonport Hill. Once back on the level the extra horses were returned to Stonehouse to assist the next tram, but two more were added for the final hill along Chapel Street.

In 1901 the Stonehouse line was converted to electric traction. At the same time the line was narrowed to match the 3 ft 6 in (1,067 mm) gauge of the Plymouth and Devonport lines. The electric trams ran around the loop at Devonport in a clockwise direction which removed a potential conflict between north and southbound trams at Cumberland Street. The tracks in Plymouth and Devonport were sold to the respective corporations and leased back to the tram company, but the section through Stonehouse remained in its ownership. The leases ran for 21 years, after which the Stonehouse company sold out to the Plymouth Corporation Tramways Department, which by then was operating all the other trams in the city. The Plymouth, Devonport and Stonehouse Tramway Company was a wholly owned subsidiary of the Provincial Tramways Company

=== Plymouth, Devonport and District ===
Plymouth, Devonport, and District Tramways Act 1882
- Act of Parliament
- Parliament of the United Kingdom
- Long title: An Act for making tramways in the county of Devon to be called "the Plymouth Devonport and District Tramways" and for other purposes.
- Citation: 45 & 46 Vict. c. clix

Dates
- Royal assent: 24 July 1882

Other legislation
- Repealed by: Plymouth City Council Act 1987

Status: Repealed

Text of statute as originally enacted

Plymouth, Devonport and District Tramways Act 1884
- Act of Parliament
- Parliament of the United Kingdom
- Long title: An Act to extend the time for the completion of the Tramways authorised by the Plymouth Devonport and District Tramways Act 1882[af] and for other purposes.
- Citation: 47 & 48 Vict. c. ccxl

Dates
- Royal assent: 7 August 1884

Other legislation
- Repealed by: Plymouth Corporation Act 1915

Status: Repealed

Text of statute as originally enacted

Plymouth, Devonport and District Tramways Act 1886
- Act of Parliament
- Parliament of the United Kingdom
- Long title: An Act for authorising the release of the Balance of the Deposit Fund remaining deposited as security for the completion of certain of the Tramways authorised by the Plymouth Devonport and District Tramways Act 1882.
- Citation: 50 Vict. c. xxiv

Dates
- Royal assent: 25 September 1886

Text of statute as originally enacted

The Plymouth, Devonport and District Tramways Company was established by an act of Parliament, the Plymouth, Devonport, and District Tramways Act 1882 (45 & 46 Vict. c. clix) to build a 10.5 miles (16.9 km) network in the Three Towns and as far east as Plympton. Of the seven routes authorised only two were built, one from West Hoe via Millbay to Hyde Park Corner at Mutley. This ran along Coburg Street and North Road to avoid the steep North Hill. The other route ran from the town centre to Southside Street in the Barbican. The tram cars (built by the Starbuck Car and Wagon Company) were kept in a depot at West Hoe and powered by 0-4-0 steam locomotives built by William Wilkinson of Wigan. The Board of Trade refused to allow the use of steam traction, nor trams to run along the track laid in Richmond Street and so trams from Mutley could not reach the town centre. The company pressed on, ignoring the Board of Trade ban on the use of steam, and inaugurated a regular service on 4 November.

Devonport Corporation obtained an injunction from the Chancery Division of the High Court on 14 November to prevent the company opening or operating any services until the whole of the system was complete. The company lost an appeal in the Court of Appeal, and this was the end of steam tramways in Plymouth. The actions of the company and the Board of Trade resulted in the Derry v Peek ruling in the House of Lords.

Plymouth Tramways Act 1892
- Act of Parliament
- Parliament of the United Kingdom
- Long title: An Act to revive the powers and extend the time for completion and opening of the Plymouth Tramways to authorise and confirm an Agreement between the Plymouth Tramways Company and the Mayor Aldermen and Burgesses of the borough of Plymouth and for other purposes.
- Citation: 55 & 56 Vict. c. clxii

Dates
- Royal assent: 27 June 1892

Other legislation
- Repealed by: Plymouth Corporation Act 1915

Status: Repealed

The company failed to raise sufficient capital to complete their schemes and so sold out to a new Plymouth Tramways Company in 1886 by virtue of the Plymouth Tramways Act 1892 (55 & 56 Vict. c. clxii). This company closed the line from the town centre to the Barbican and introduced horse power on the remaining routes. The steam engines were sold to the Swanscombe Colliery in Kent where they worked until 1922. The company operated the tramway until 1892 when it was sold to Plymouth Corporation for £12,500.

=== Devonport and District ===
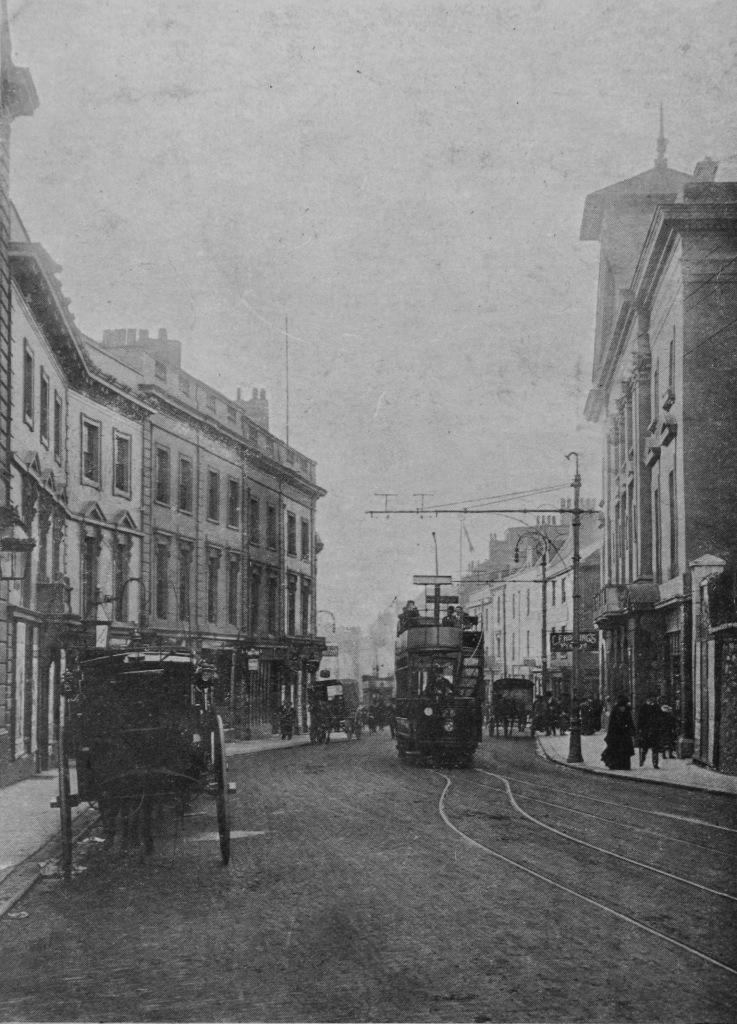
Devonport car 25 at the Fore Street terminus

The last commercial tram operation to start up in Plymouth was the Devonport and District Tramways Company. Established in 1898 by the British Electric Traction Group (BET), it started to operate services in 1901. Trams started from two places in Devonport: Fore Street (close to the Stonehouse company's line) and Morice Town, which was closer to the main dockyards. From Fore Street one route ran eastwards along Paradise Road and Stuart Road to Pennycomequick, serving the LSWR station and terminating near North Road station in Plymouth. Another route ran north-eastwards to Milehouse where the main tram depot was established. From Morice Town one route ran eastwards to Milehouse, and another ran northwards to Camel's Head via Keyham. These routes totalled 4.75 miles (7.64 km). Devonport Corporation provided the electricity from their power station at Stonehouse Creek near the Pennycomequick line.

The company's proposed routes were not comprehensive enough to meet the corporation's aspirations, so they built two further lines. One was an extension from Milehouse to Peverell, the other was a line from Camel's Head to Saltash Passage. This was not initially connected to the line from Morice Town as the wooden bridge across Camel's Head Creek was not able to accommodate tram lines, so a small depot was provided at Camel's Head. The corporation leased its lines to the Devonport and District Tramways Company in 1903. The company opened a tea room at Little Ash near Saltash Passage and offered round-trip tickets, with the journey to the tea room being by tram in one direction and by boat in the other.

When the 'Three Towns' merged into one in October 1914, the company sold out to the Plymouth Corporation.

=== Plymouth Corporation ===
Plymouth Corporation's first venture into tramway operation was when it took over the failing Plymouth Tramways Company in 1892. Its new Tramway Department continued to operate the routes to Mutley and West Hoe with horse trams, new cars being delivered in 1894 and 1895. The West Hoe line was lengthened a short distance to Pier Street on 11 March 1893. From Mutley the line was extended north from Hyde Park Corner to Compton Lane on 3 April 1893. Next came a connection from Richmond Street along Old Town Street to Market Avenue to give the Mutley line a more convenient town centre terminus. In 1895 a new line was opened from Mutley Plain straight down North Hill, joining up with the flatter route via North Road at a place later known as Spear's Corner in Tavistock Road. The following year saw street widening that allowed the opening of the short section which the Board of Trade had previously refused to approve. 10 December 1896 a completely new line was opened eastwards from the junction at the bottom of Tavistock Road (now known as Drake's Circus) to Prince Rock.

Work started to convert the corporation's lines to electric power in 1898. The first to be done was from the Market Avenue to Prince Rock which was operated by electric trams from 22 January 1899. Electricity was supplied from the corporation's own power station at Cattewater (near the eastern end of the line) and a new tram depot was built in Elliot Road. The electrification was soon extended from Market Avenue to the theatre. The first six electric cars were equipped to haul an old horse tram as a trailer, but this practice was discontinued after a derailment in Old Town Street. 4 April 1901 saw the route to Compton turned over to electric operation. A new electric route eastwards to Beaumont Road was opened on 2 April 1902. The horse trams to Peverell were replaced by electric on 13 January 1903, and those to Pennycomequick on 21 September 1905. This just left horse trams on the West Hoe route, which was converted on 22 June 1907.

In October 1914 the 'Three Towns' were merged under the auspices of Plymouth Corporation. The lines owned by Devonport Corporation came under the control of Plymouth Corporation, and at the same time BET's Devonport and District Tramways Company was sold to the corporation. The following year saw connections made between the two networks at Pennycomequick and Peverell. After World War I the old Plymouth tram depots started to be run down while the old Devonport depot at Milehouse was expanded and new offices built there. The facilities provided were capable of undertaking complete rebuilding and rebodying of old tram cars. The Stonehouse line remained independent but the portions of the line in both Plymouth and Devonport had been sold to the respective corporations in 1901 and leased back for 21 years, so when this lease expired in 1922 the company sold out to the Plymouth Corporation. This finally bought all the routes under one ownership. New connections from the Stonehouse line were laid between Derry's Clock with the adjacent Theatre terminus used by most of the Plymouth routes, and at Fore Street with the old Devonport network.

=== Closure ===
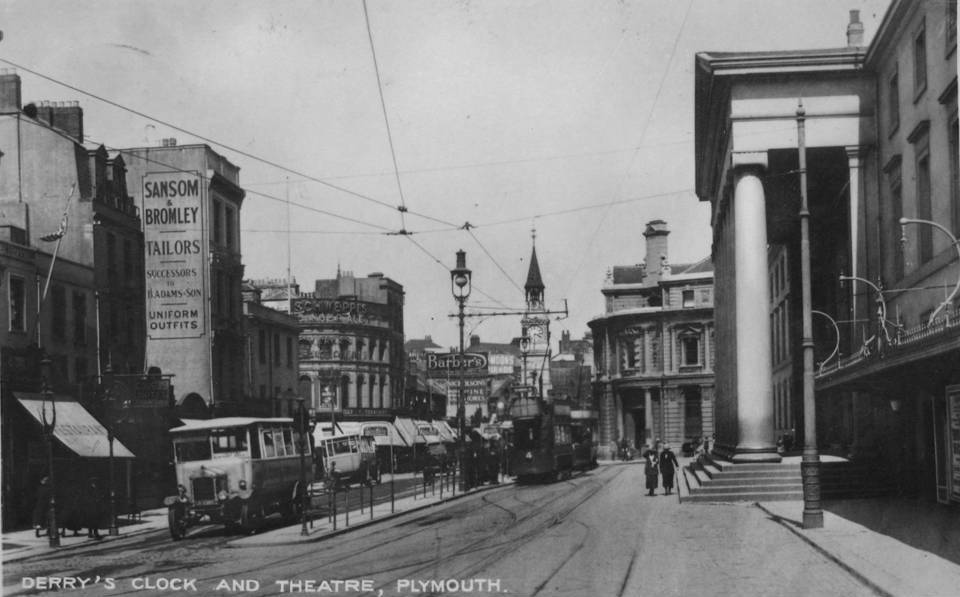
Corporation buses and trams outside the Theatre

By 1930 it was becoming necessary to renew much of the tramway rolling stock. Consideration was given to converting to trolleybuses, but instead it was decided to implement a ten-year programme to replace the trams by motor buses. The first line to be converted was the Devonport to St Budeaux line which was closed in October 1930 when six new double-deck buses replaced the trams. The line to West Hoe closed in 1931, the line to Compton closed in 1932, and regular services to the Royal Naval Barracks withdrawn in 1934. Further new buses were brought for these routes, and a few second hand tramcars from the now closed Exeter Tramway Company and Torquay Tramways allowed the oldest of the Plymouth cars to be withdrawn. In 1935 the Milehouse to Devonport line closed following the delivery of the city's first diesel-engined buses. More were needed in 1936 to allow the closure of the line to Prince Rock and in 1937 to allow the withdrawal of the two long circular routes. The plan to replace the remaining trams was put on hold following the outbreak of World War II in September 1942 as they were powered by electricity generated by British coal, whereas buses relied on imported fuel. The one remaining route, from Theatre to Peverell, was therefore kept running. However, following city centre bomb damage in April 1941 (when car 133 was destroyed) the service only operated between Drake's Circus and Peverell. Milehouse depot was also bombed in April 1941. The final tram operated in September 1945 once the war in Europe was finished.

A section of old tramway rail was unearthed in 2016 in a joinery workshop situated between Bath Street and Martin Street in Plymouth where it had been built-in prior to 1945. Volunteers from the Plym Valley Railway recovered the 116-year-old artifact.

== Routes ==
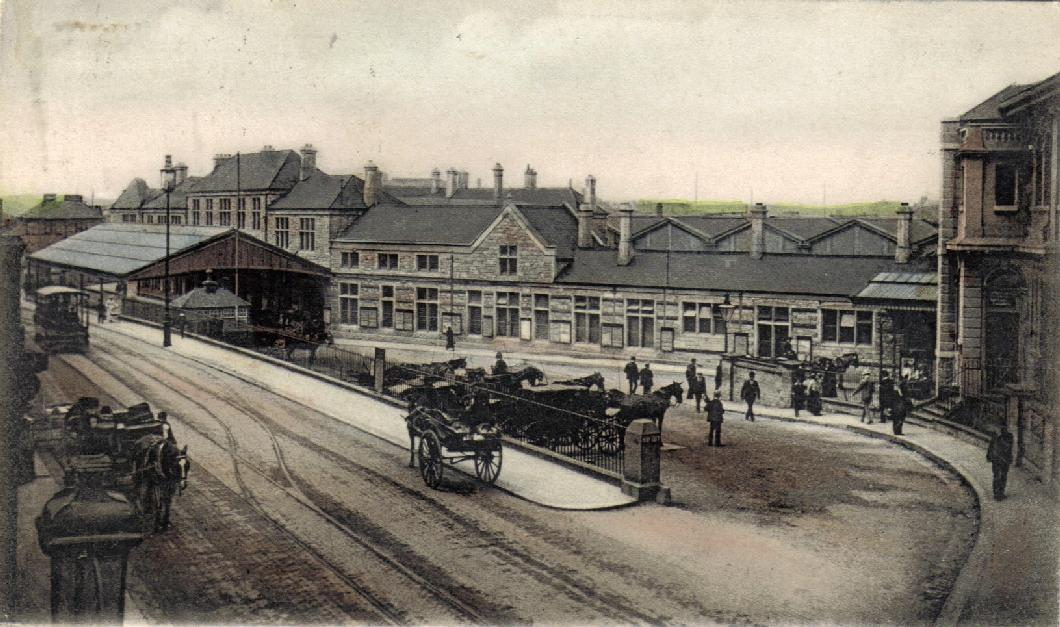
The West Hoe route passing Millbay railway station

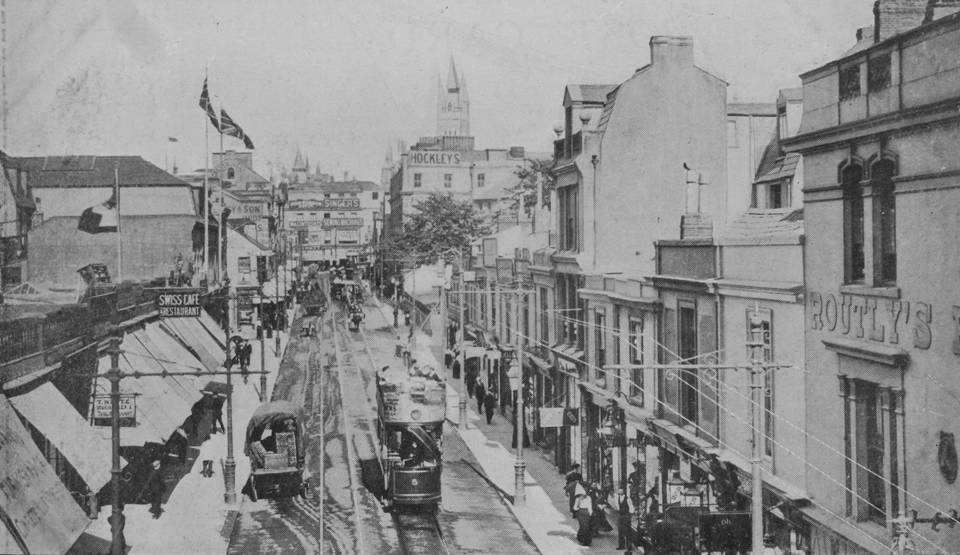
The Stonehouse route in Union Street

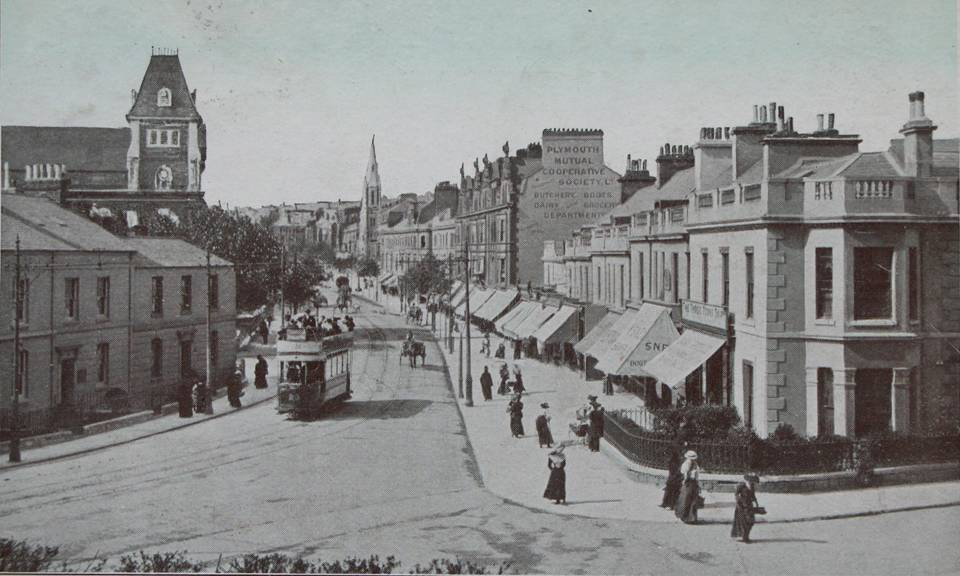
Mutley Plain on the Theatre to Peverell and Compton routes

The connections made in 1915 between the Devonport and Plymouth networks gave the opportunity to revise the routes and offer through services between Devonport and the centre of Plymouth. In 1921 the service 9 to West Hoe was withdrawn and replaced by extending certain services on routes 4 and 5 from Beaumont Road and Prince Rock to West Hoe. The opening a new line from Pennycomequick to Milehouse via Alma Road allowed a short lived circular service via Peverell and Alma Road. The absorption of the Stonehouse route in 1922 allowed the introduction of a longer-lived circular route by extending routes 2 and 6 back to Theatre along Union Street.

No.	Period	Route
1	1915–1932	Theatre to Compton
2	1915–1922	Theatre to Fore Street via Peverell
2	1922–1939	Theatre and Fore Street circular via Peverell and Union Street
3	1915–1935	Theatre to Morice Square via Peverell
4	1915–1921	Theatre to Beaumont Road
4	1921–1931	West Hoe to Beaumont Road
5	1915–1921	Theatre to Prince Rock
5	1921–1931	West Hoe to Prince Rock
6	1915–1922	Guildhall to Fore Street via Stuart Road
6	1922–1937	Theatre and Fore Street circular via Stuart Road and Union Street
7	1915–1921	Guildhall to St Budeaux via Stuart Road
7	1921–1930	Theatre to St Budeaux via Stuart Road
7	1930–1934	Theatre to Keyham via Stuart Road
8	1915–1930	Morice Square to St Budeaux
9	1915–1921	Drake's Circus to West Hoe
9	1922	Theatre and Peverell circular via Mutley Plain and Alma Road
10	1922–1934	Theatre to Morice Square via Alma Road and Keyham
11	1922–1931	Beaumont Road to Fore Street via Union Street
12	1922–1936	Prince Rock to Fore Street via Union Street
14	1922–1923	Theatre to St Budeaux via Milehouse
14	1923–1930	Theatre to Saltash Passage via Milehouse
14	1930–1934	Theatre to Keyham via Milehouse
P	1922–1945	Theatre to Peverell

== Fleet ==
The Plymouth Corporation electric tramcars were generally numbered in order of delivery until 1927. The next deliveries (in 1931) saw the series restarted at number 1 as the oldest cars had been withdrawn by then.

Numbers	Period	Builder	Truck	Comments
1–6	1899–1929	Milne	Peckham cantilever	Fitted for towing trailer car
7–20	1901–1934	Brush	Peckham cantilever	
21–30	1903–1934	Milne	Peckham cantilever	
31–36	1905–1934	Brush	Brill 21E	
37–42	1906–1924	Brush	Brill 21E	Single deck
43–61	1915–1936	Brush	Peckham P22	
63–65	1914–1930	Brush		Devonport cars built 1901
66–69	1914–1934	Brush		Devonport cars built 1911
70–73	1914–1935	Birmingham		Devonport cars built 1911
74–78	1914–1934	Brill	Brill	Devonport cars built 1901
90, 92	1920–1936	Brush	Peckham P22	
91, 93	1920–1935	PCT		Devonport cars rebuilt at Milehouse
94–105	1919–1936	Brush	Peckham P22	
112	1922–1935	PCT		Built at Milehouse
113–127	1922–1935	Dick Kerr	Brill 21E	Stonehouse cars built 1901 and 1916
131–150	1924–1942	English Electric	Brill 21E	
151	1925–1945	PCT	PCT bogie	Later converted to four-wheel truck
152–166	1927–1945	PCT	PCT bogie	Most converted to four-wheel truck
1–7	1931–1942	Brush	Brill 21E	Exeter cars built 1925
8, 9	1931–1937	Brush	Peckham P22	Exeter cars built 1920
10–15	1933–1942	Brush	Hoffman bogie	Torquay cars built 1925
16–21	1933–1936	Brush		Torquay cars built 1906

Although most cars were bought from the usual engineering companies, the larger depots carried out significant rebuilding work and Milehouse is even credited with building new cars. The first was car 91 in 1920, which had a completely new body built on the truck from Devonport car 22. Similar work was carried out on car 24 which emerged as a new number 93 in 1922. A third new car emerged the same year and was given the number 112. Some engineering cars were also built, or rebuilt, at the various depots. Most notable being a rail grinder built at Crompton depot in 1915, and car 42 which was converted to a welding car in 1924.

The Stonehouse line opened with eight horse trams but replaced these with a larger fleet of 12 in about 1888. Its electric fleet of 1901 comprised 14 cars numbered 1 to 12, 14 and 15. A car 16 was added to the fleet in 1916 and they became Plymouth cars 113 to 127 in 1922.

The Plymouth, Devonport and District steam trams were numbered 1 to 5, and eight trailers were available. When Plymouth Tramways took over they used twelve horse cars, all of which passed to the corporation in 1892. By 1898 their horse trams numbered 29, additional cars having been purchased from Milnes and Bristol Tramways.

Devonport's initial fleet of electric cars in 1901 comprised 20 cars from the Brill company, and 5 cars built by Brush that came secondhand from a tramway in Birmingham. In 1911 8 more were delivered, half from Brush and half from Birmingham.

Devonport nos.	Built	Plymouth nos.
1–20	1901	74–88
21–25	1901	63–65, 91, 93
26–29	1911	66–69
30–33	1911	70–73

== Liveries ==
The Plymouth, Stonehouse and Devonport trams were painted light green and white.

The Plymouth, Devonport and District steam trams had brown ends and underframes with white sides.

The Devonport and District company painted their trams in chocolate and cream, but by 1914 were changing this to dark green and cream.

Plymouth Corporation used a vermillion scheme from 1892 until 1922, when a new primrose yellow and white livery was introduced.

== Depots ==
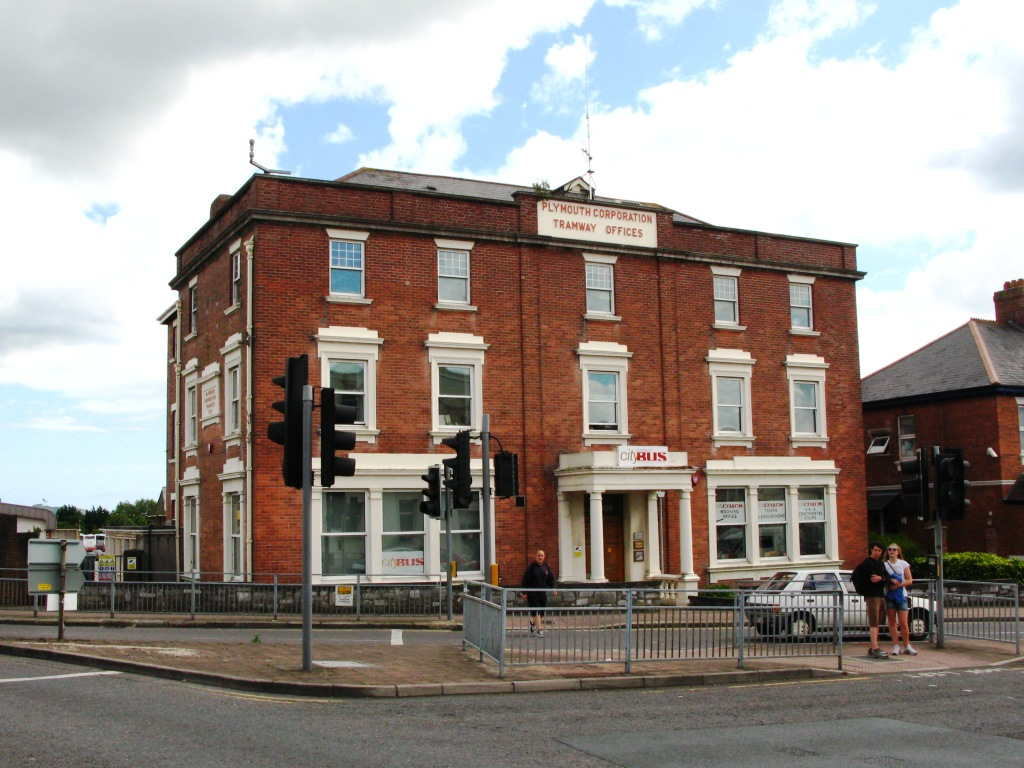
The offices at Milehouse Depot, built by Plymouth Corporation Tramways Department in 1922

The largest depot on the system was at Milehouse. This had been opened in 1901 by the Devonport company. After the merger with the Plymouth Corporation it was developed as the principal depot for the combined fleets. Connections at Pennycomequick and Peverell allowed cars from Milehouse to reach the Plymouth routes, and a new route along Alma Road opened in May 1922 which gave a direct route from Milehouse to Pennycomequick and the Theatre. At around this time the facilities at the depot were expanded. Two new sheds containing a total of six tracks were built at the east end of the original sheds, a new entrance was laid to the Milhouse Road/Alma Road junction, and new offices for the Tramways Department were opened. By 1936 all the other depots had been closed and all trams were kept at Milehouse. The depot also maintained the growing fleet of motor buses. This work has continued since the withdrawal of the last trams, and the offices are still the home for Plymouth Citybus

The two depots for the original Plymouth electric trams were at Lower Compton Road in Compton (opened in 1893) and in Elliott Road, Prince Rock (1899). They closed in 1934 and 1936 respectively. Horse trams had been kept in depots at Belgrave Mews (Mutley) and West Hoe Road. The Stonehouse company's horse tram depot had been in Manor Lane, but when the route was electrified in 1901 a new depot was established in Market Street. The Devonport company also had a small depot in Harford Place at Camels Head for the two cars on the route to St Budeaux. The depot was retained after this was connected to the line from Morice Town until 1930.

== Engineering ==
Company	Rail	Minimum radius	Maximum gradient
Stonehouse	84 lb/yd	34 feet (10 m)	1 in 11 (9%)
Devonport	97 lb/yd	50 feet (15 m)	1 in 10 (10%)
Plymouth	92 lb/yd	35 feet (11 m)	1 in 9 (11%)
