= Packet Newspapers =

Falmouth & Penryn Packet; Helston Packet; The Packet (incorporating Truro and Camborne & Redruth); West Cornwall Packet
- Type: Weekly newspapers
- Format: Tabloid
- Owner(s): Newsquest
- Founded: 1829
- Headquarters: Falmouth, Cornwall
- Circulation: 2,824 (as of 2023)
- Website: thepacket.co.uk

Packet Newspapers (Cornwall) Limited is a wholly owned subsidiary of the Newsquest media group, which publishes the Packet series of weekly tabloid newspapers.

The series is named after the Falmouth Packet service, which commenced operation in about 1688.

== Circulation ==
Weekly circulation for all Packet titles was 39,350 as of 27 February 2013, 32% greater than that of their regional rival, Northcliffe Media's The West Briton, which had a circulation of 29,710 on the same date.

== The Falmouth & Penryn Packet ==
The Falmouth & Penryn Packet is a weekly tabloid newspaper sold in and around the towns of Falmouth and Penryn on the southern coast of western Cornwall.

Several newspapers have borne the title Falmouth Packet in the past. The earliest, founded in 1801, was the Cornwall Gazette & Falmouth Packet, which lasted under that title for less than two years when the proprietor, one Thomas Flindell (1767-1824), was imprisoned for debt. It was the first Cornish newspaper.

In 1803 Flindell moved his operations to Truro and started the Royal Cornwall Gazette and Western Advertiser, which ultimately was absorbed into The West Briton following a bitter feud between the two publications.

The second Falmouth Packet was the Falmouth Packet & Cornish Herald, founded in 1829 and published until 1848. The third, Lake's Falmouth Packet & Cornwall Advertiser, is the ancestor of the present-day Falmouth & Penryn Packet; it started publication in 1858.

The current Falmouth & Penryn Packet is the lead title in a series of Packet weekly paid-for tabloids for central and western Cornwall.

== The Helston Packet ==
The Helston Packet is a weekly tabloid newspaper sold in and around the town of Helston in southern Cornwall, including Porthleven, Mullion and The Lizard peninsula. It was first published in 1969.

All Packet titles are published by Packet Newspapers from editorial offices in Falmouth.

== Website ==
All the Packet titles, plus the closely associated Helston & District Gazette, share a common website - www.thepacket.co.uk.

== Company history ==
Packet Newspapers used to be part of the Express Newspapers group (and, before that, its predecessor Beaverbrook Newspapers), but as of 1987 is a subsidiary of the Newsquest newspaper group's South West division.

There are currently (February 2013) four Packets - The Falmouth/Penryn Packet, The Helston Packet, The West Cornwall Packet, and The Packet (covering Truro, Camborne and Redruth); in 2010 the Penwith Pirate was replaced by the West Cornwall Packet. They all come out on Wednesdays.

== See also ==
- Media in Cornwall
