= Smallholder (magazine) =

British farmers magazine, founded 1910

Founded in 1910 for small farmers, allotment holders and gardeners, Smallholder magazine is published monthly by Packet Newspapers in Falmouth, Cornwall. It is a national UK magazine.

== Current articles ==
- School farms
- Community supported agriculture
- Government policy towards smallholders
- Animal housing
