= Charles Chorley =

English man of letters (c. 1810 – 1874)

Charles Chorley (c. 1810 – 1874) was an English journalist, man of letters and translator from several languages.

== Life ==
Chorley was born in Taunton, Somerset about 1810, the son of Lt Paymaster John Chorley of the 1st Somerset Militia (died February 1839). Most of his life was spent at Truro, where he acted for 30 years as sub-editor and reporter of the Royal Cornwall Gazette, an old-established Tory paper. He held also the posts of secretary to the Truro Public Rooms Company, and sub-manager of the Truro Savings Bank. For eleven years (1863–1874) he edited the Journal of the Royal Institution of Cornwall, and was involved in managing the society. He died at Lemon Street, Truro, on 22 June 1874, aged 64.

== Writings ==
Chorley was a man of wide scholarship, versed in the classics and several modern languages, and of good classical taste. It was his custom to print for the private gratification of his friends, to whom alone the initials "C. C." revealed the authorship, small volumes of translations from dead and living languages. The most important were versions of George Buchanan's tragedies of Jephtha, or the Vow, and The Baptist, or Calumny, and two volumes of miscellaneous renderings from the German, Italian, Spanish, and French, as well as from the Latin, Greek, and Hebrew.

The titles of all these works appear in the pages of the Bibliotheca Cornubiensis. When the council of the Royal Institution of Cornwall proposed to bring out a volume under that title, the preparatory lists of the publications known to them were drawn up by Chorley and Thomas Quiller Couch. The scheme did not propose to go beyond works relating to the topography or the history of the county, and even within that limited area, the design was beyond the power of persons not acquainted with the treasures of the British Museum.

== Sources ==
- Journal of the Royal Institution of Cornwall, October 1874, pp. iii–iv, vii
- G. C. Boase and W. P. Courtney's Bibliotheca Cornubiensis, i. 69; iii. 1009 and 1119.
- H. C. G. Matthew (2004). "Chorley, Charles (1810?–1874)". Oxford Dictionary of National Biography. Oxford University Press.
