= 999 (British TV series) =

British docudrama television series (1992–2003)

- Genre: Docudrama
- Created by: Peter Salmon
- Based on: Rescue 911
- Presented by: Michael Buerk; Fiona Foster; Juliet Morris; Donna Bernard; Catherine Hood
- Country of origin: United Kingdom
- Original language: English
- No. of series: 12 (main); 5 (Lifesavers); 1 (International)
- No. of episodes: 103 (main); 41 (Lifesavers); 6 (International); 20 (Specials)

Production
- Running time: 30–50 minutes

Original release
- Network: BBC One
- Release: 25 June 1992 – 17 September 2003

Related
- Real Rescues

999 (initially known as 999: Dramatic Stories of Real Life Rescues in some listings) is a British docudrama television series presented by Michael Buerk, that premiered on 25 June 1992 on BBC One and ran until 17 September 2003. The series got its name from the emergency telephone number used in the United Kingdom and is the British adaptation of the American series Rescue 911, which premiered in April 1989 and ended in August 1996.

A number of specials and spin-off shows were also aired, including five series of 999 Lifesavers (1994–1998) hosted by Buerk and Juliet Morris (later replaced by Donna Bernard), and 999 International in 1997. A similar, more child-friendly series called Against All Odds was aired on CBBC in the early 2000s. This version was hosted by Kate Gerbeau and Jake Humphrey.

== History ==
In the first series, each episode included two reconstructions of real emergencies, using actors and occasionally Buerk himself, as well as some of the real people involved in the emergency. Buerk was joined by Fiona Foster who acted as a video reporter. By the second series, episodes of 999 included more reconstructions. Foster was replaced by Juliet Morris, who also hosted the spin-off series programmes 999 Lifesavers and 999 International alongside Buerk. Morris left the show in 1997, with Donna Bernard taking over as co-presenter for the seventh regular series in 1998 and the final series of 999 Lifesavers later that year. Following Bernard's departure, Buerk hosted the next two series alone. New titles and theme music were used for the first time. Stunt performer Marc Cass was also introduced, appearing in a regular segment throughout both series.

While recreating an accident for an episode in 1993, veteran stuntman Tip Tipping was killed in a parachuting accident. In an interview with Radio Times in May 2000, Buerk revealed that he originally wanted the series to show rescues ending in tragedy in order to heighten its suspense. Producers instead opted for a more uplifting format which proved more effective for the show's success.

In September 2002, it was announced that the show had been cancelled and that the next series, which would be aired the following year, was to be the last. The programme underwent a revamp in 2001 to include a new segment called 999 Saved My Life, which showed how members of the public had been able to save a person in danger by following advice given on the show. Buerk was joined by a new co-host, Dr Catherine Hood, who tested members of the public on their knowledge of first aid. The series received respectable ratings of around four million when it aired.

== Transmissions ==
=== Original series ===
Series	Start date	End date	Episodes
1	25 June 1992	6 August 1992	7
2	27 April 1993	8 June 1993	7
3	8 April 1994	10 June 1994	10
4	7 April 1995	16 June 1995	10
5	12 April 1996	14 June 1996	10
6	8 May 1997	12 June 1997	6
7	7 April 1998	16 June 1998	10
8	27 April 1999	17 November 1999	10
9	5 April 2000	27 September 2000	5
10	29 May 2001	10 September 2001	14
11	28 October 2002	14 January 2003	7
12	15 April 2003	17 September 2003	4

=== 999 Lifesavers ===
Series	Start date	End date	Episodes	Main presenter(s)	Co-presenter(s)
1	8 September 1994	13 October 1994	6	Michael Buerk	Juliet Morris
2	15 September 1995	17 November 1995	10	Michael Buerk	Juliet Morris
3	3 September 1996	17 December 1996	10	Michael Buerk	Juliet Morris
4	17 October 1997	6 January 1998	10	Michael Buerk	Donna Bernard

=== 999 International ===
Series	Start date	End date	Episodes
1	31 July 1997	11 September 1997 (Note: The final episode of this series was delayed by a week due to the Death of Diana, Princess of Wales.)	6

=== Specials ===
Date	Title
30 May 1994	Young Lifesavers
6 December 1994 (Note: Repeated on 14 November 1995)	No Excuses
28 April 1995	The Point of No Return
12 January 1996	Operation Coathanger
19 January 1996	Sea of Fire
26 January 1996	The Lonely Walk
8 February 1996 (Note: Replaced Part 1 of 999 International Rescue)	The Flying Doctors
20 February 1996	999 International Rescue (part 1)
27 February 1996	999 International Rescue (part 2)
3 May 1996	Speed Kills
6 May 1997	Missing in Action
14 October 1997	The Great Storm
17 March 1998 (Note: Postponed from 18 September 1997)	Escape from Paradise
27 March 1998	Heart Special
21 August 1998	Diana's Legacy
8 September 1998	999 Lifesavers Baby Special
25 November 1998	Storm Alert
5 January 1999	The New Year Storms
5 April 1999	The Easter Floods
17 August 1999	999 Fire Rescues
2 September 1999	999 Animal Rescue

== Merchandise ==
=== Tie-in publication ===
- 999: Dramatic Stories of Real-Life Rescues by Michael Buerk, published by BBC Books in 1994. ISBN 0-563-37049-1.
  Features 15 gripping stories as featured on the show, along with 999 Safety Advice: simple, easy-to-understand instructions on how to deal with common emergencies.
- 999 Young Lifesavers by Michael Buerk, published by BBC Books in 1996. ISBN 0-563-40431-0.
  Tying in with the children's television series, "999" and "999 Lifesavers", this book contains instructions on how to react in emergencies. The topics covered include coping with sudden illness, what to do if someone is struck by lightning, survival out of doors, electrical accidents and road accidents. There is also advice on how to avoid accidents in the first place, focusing on, for instance, dangerous plants and animals, and sensible behaviour at the seaside.

=== Video releases ===
- 999: Lifesaver Video (1996)
- 999: Family Safety Video (1998)

== See also ==
- Real Rescues (2007–2013)
