= Stranger (magazine) =

2004–2007 British bi-monthly lifestyle magazine

'Stranger'
- Stranger Issue 15
- Editor and Publisher: Helen Gilchrist
- Categories: Lifestyle magazine
- Frequency: Bi-monthly
- Publisher: Helen Gilchrist
- First issue: September 2004
- Final issue: September 2007
- Country: United Kingdom
- Based in: Falmouth, Cornwall
- Language: English
- Website: stranger-mag.com

Stranger was a bi-monthly creative lifestyle magazine based in Falmouth, Cornwall, United Kingdom that focused on the alternative, creative, non-metrocentric side of British culture. Since its first local issue in September 2004, the magazine became distributed worldwide and featured articles relating to the environment, current affairs, music, fashion, and surf and skate culture. It ended publication in September 2007.

== History ==
Stranger was started by Helen Gilchrist, a freelance journalist who funded the project with loans from The Princes Trust and Objective One. The first issue of Stranger came out in Cornwall and London in September 2004.

The initial idea for the magazine in 2004 was just to do a small, free magazine to circulate around Cornwall, in the South West United Kingdom with a population of about 500,000. However, by July 2005, Gilchrist's leadership of Stranger was recognised with awards for best marketing strategy and best promotion of Cornwall. Not everyone was as impressed with the magazine and in February 2006 a detractor posted on a website that Stranger presented the most "banal, misleading and downright disgusting portrayal of Cornwall ever."

Despite some criticism, the year 2006 was a good year for Stranger. After adding a featured stockist page in issue 12 dedicated to commercial wholesalers that stocks merchandise, the magazine received many calls from current and potential new stockists asking to be listed on that page.

By April 2006 – around 18 months after launch – the magazine increased distribution and saw its national and international subscription rate rise dramatically. This permitted Stranger to increase revenue by introducing a new cover price. To help Stranger handle the additional sales, the magazine contracted with Falmouth-based 3D design company OH Design to create eye-catching retail display stands.

In February 2007, Borders began distributing Stranger nationwide in England through Borders' chain of bookstores. This allowed Stranger to reach current and new readers more effectively. In addition, Stranger has sought out other national distribution chains to stock the magazine.

In 2007, Stranger also began publishing on the Internet to extend its brand beyond print publication and to better reach its target 18 to 35-year-old age group. By May 2007, the Stranger websitehad received an average of more than 400,000 hits a month. The magazine ceased publication in September 2007.

== Community relations ==
In addition to reaching out to the community through its website, Stranger has organised a number of charity and social events in conjunction with the magazine. These have included treeplanting events in North Cornwall (2004 and 2005), a Sudan Aid fundraiser party at the Troubador Studios in Falmouth (2005), monthly Stranger Social nights around Cornwall (featuring live music and DJs), snowboarding trips to the Alps (2005–2007), and a WaterAid Fundraiser in Redruth (2006).

== Awards ==
The magazine has won the following awards at the Cornwall Chamber of Commerce and Hub Youth Business Awards:

- Best Marketing Strategy (2005)
- Best Promotion of Cornwall (2005)
- Best Employee of a Cornish Business (2007).

== See also ==
- Falmouth, Cornwall
- Cornish media
