= Donna Bernard =

British journalist and TV presenter

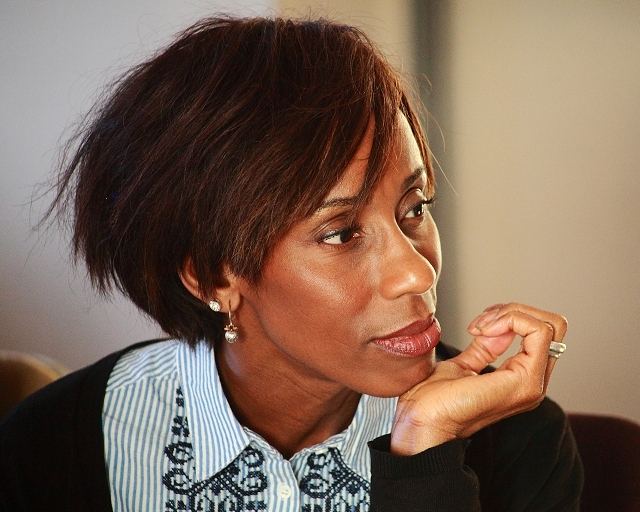
- Donna Bernard at a media event, 2015
- Born: Basildon, Essex
- Occupation: Journalist
- Years active: 1990s – present

Donna Bernard is a British journalist and TV presenter best known for her work at the BBC and GMTV.

== Early life ==
Donna Bernard was born in Basildon, Essex, England. Her parents were migrants from Jamaica. She was educated at Woodlands School for Girls and the University of North London, where she studied German and philosophy.

== Television career ==
After starting in TV as a producer for Worldwide Television News, she was selected by the British media personality, Janet Street-Porter, to co-present the launch of the UK’s first national cable channel, L!VE TV, and later appeared with Michael Buerk in the BBC series 999 and 999 Lifesavers, BBC2's Trust Me, I’m a Doctor, the late-night media-affairs show On Air, which she co-presented with David Aaronovitch, and the BBC1 daytime show What Now?, co-presented with the British Conservative politician, Edwina Currie.

She was later New York Correspondent and Show Business Correspondent for the GMTV, and she worked on ITV’s Lorraine show, covering fitness and beauty. In 2000 she was interviewed by OK! magazine about her role as a celebrity ambassador for the charity Save the Children UK.

Donna Bernard, who is based in the English West Country, has been Chief Reporter for Midwest Radio in Dorset, and co-presented the ITV West consumer show Biteback with Steve Scott, who is now ITN's sports editor.

As of 2011, she a freelance presenter and reporter for London-based ITN Productions, she was co-anchor for World Briefing on Arise News in London. She also presents items for a production company working on training videos for the UK government and has worked in corporate communications for local business.
