= St. Ives Times & Echo =

- Front page of St. Ives Times & Echo
- Type: Weekly newspaper
- Format: Broadsheet
- Owner(s): St. Ives Printing & Publishing Company
- Editor: Toni Carver
- Founded: 1899; 127 years ago (as The Western Echo); 1910 (as The St. Ives Times), merged (1957)
- Political alignment: Independent
- Headquarters: High Street, St Ives, Cornwall, England,
- Website: Stivesnews.co.uk

The St. Ives Times and Echo was an independent, weekly local newspaper based in St Ives, Cornwall, England, United Kingdom. It closed after the death of its editor, Toni Carver, in November 2025.

== History ==
The modern St. Ives Times & Echo is the result of a number of incorporations culminating with the amalgamation of The Western Echo (founded in 1899 by William J. Jacobs) and The St. Ives Times (founded in 1910 by Martin Osbourne Clock) amalgamated in 1957. The St Ives Printing and Publishing Company that owns the newspaper also prints the newspaper itself, as well as printing and publishing and books on art and the environment.

== Circulation and content ==
Published every Friday, its circulation covers the St. Ives Bay Area and is intensive in the old Borough area of St Ives which encompasses Carbis Bay, Halsetown, St. Erth and Lelant. In Hayle, the newspaper is published under its own banner of The Hayle Times with identical content. It covers mainly local news with some national and occasionally international news items, particularly art related, which have local interest or appeal. Its current proprietor and editor is Toni Carver.

== Printing ==
The St Ives Times and Echo prints on recycled sc mechanical paper (since the 1960s), instead of the more normal newsprint, as well as printing photographs (black & white only) to a higher resolution than is normal for a newspaper. It has advertisements on its front page (the Cornish & Devon Post also does this), and it prints in ISO SRA 3 page format (bigger than tabloid but smaller than broadsheet). The main office is in the High Street in St Ives.
