= Juliet Morris =

British television presenter (born 1965)

- Born: Juliet Claire Morris; 26 April 1965 (age 61); London, England
- Education: University of Hull
- Occupations: Journalist, newsreader and television presenter
- Years active: 1989–present
- Employer: BBC

Juliet Morris (born 26 April 1965) is a British television presenter.

== Early life ==
Morris was educated at Lady Eleanor Holles School, an independent school for girls in Hampton in West London, where she recalled the difficulties of being left-handed. At the age of eleven, she moved to a private school (St Margarets, Exeter) when her family settled in Devon. She graduated from the University of Hull in 1986 having studied English and Drama.

== Broadcasting career ==
Following a spell on BBC South West's Spotlight, Morris went on to join the BBC children's news show Newsround in 1990. She left the show in 1995 to present BBC Breakfast News for three years. She has since presented The Heaven and Earth Show. She was also the main presenter for the Here and Now current affairs programme and co-presented the programme 999, alongside Michael Buerk.

She was also the presenter of BBC's The House Detectives (1997–2000) on which she and a team of experts, led by Dan Cruickshank, investigated the histories of houses belonging to members of the public. She presented the BBC overseas property show Uncharted Territory (2006 and 2007) and she was formerly a reporter on Countryfile.

In 1998, she made a report for Panorama on suicide among young men, during which she revealed that her younger brother, Edward, had committed suicide in 1994 at the age of 24.
