= Thomas Flindell =

- Born: 1767; Helford, Cornwall, England
- Died: July 11, 1824 (aged 56–57); Exeter, Devon, England
- Occupations: Newspaper editor, printer
- Children: 8
- Writing career
- Period: 1790–1824
- Genre: religious philosophy
- Subjects: Politics, theology

Thomas Flindell (1767 – 11 July 1824), was an English newspaper editor and printer.

== Background ==
Flindell was born in 1767 at Helford, in the parish of Manaccan, Cornwall, and was, to use his own words, "bred an illiterate half-seaman". He was apprenticed to a printer, and in 1790, when twenty-three years old, was sent to Yorkshire to conduct the Doncaster Gazette, the circulation of which he largely increased through his happy audacity in anticipating the decision of the jury in the trials of Thomas Hardy and Horne Tooke by publishing the verdict of 'not guilty.' About 1798 he returned to Helston in his native county, where he opened business as a printer, starting the 'Stannary Press,' and publishing several works by the Rev. Richard Polwhele and Dr. Robert Hawker, as well as an edition of Alexander Pope's Essay on Man.

In 1800 he removed to Falmouth, and in that year was published the first volume of his impression of the Bible, which he issued in numbers. The introduction and notes to three of the books of the Old Testament were contributed by the Rev. John Whitaker, and Polwhele wrote the notes on the other books; but the work was left incomplete, and copies are now very scarce. The first number of the Cornwall Gazette and Falmouth Packet, a weekly paper, was started at Falmouth under his editorship on 7 March 1801, and it lasted until 16 October 1802, when it ceased through the bankruptcy of his partners.

== Energy and style ==
Flindell establish a newspaper called the 'Royal Cornwall Gazette.' Its first number appeared on 2 July 1803, and it still survives. He parted with his interest in this paper in 1811, but he continued the printing business at Truro during the next year.

His next venture was the 'Western Luminary,' a weekly newspaper of tory principles, which he set on foot at Exeter early in 1813. It prospered for some years, until the fierceness of his political zeal led him to stigmatise Queen Caroline as 'notoriously devoted to Bacchus and Venus,' when Wetherell brought the matter before the House of Commons (24 and 25 July 1820), and moved that it was a breach of the house's privileges. This was not unreasonably resisted by Lord Castlereagh, and as it appeared in the subsequent discussion that a prosecution would be instituted the motion was withdrawn. For this indiscretion Flindell was prosecuted, and on 19 March 1821 was sentenced to an imprisonment of eight months in Exeter gaol.

During his confinement he composed a volume entitled Prison Recreations: the philosophy of reason and revelation attempted, with a view to the restoration of the theory of the Bible on the ruins of infidelity. The discussion of religious topics was one of his chief pleasures, and the pages of his Exeter paper contained a lengthened controversy from three divines, named Cleeve, Dennis, and Carpenter, on the Trinitarian question, which Flindell 'closed at last in a somewhat perplexed manner,' and provoked from Colton the epigram printed in Archdeacon Wrangham's catalogue of his English library, p. 564, to the effect that the three parsons had proved 'not one incomprehensible but three,' and Flindell had shown 'not three incomprehensible but one.' His prison restraint impaired his health; he wrote in January 1824 that he was breaking up fast, and his illness was aggravated by his indignation at the severe treatment which he had received, while others who had used equally strong language had escaped scot-free.

== Death ==
After a protracted illness he died at Exeter on 11 July 1824, aged 57. His wife and a numerous family survived him; he had eight children in 1806, some of whom are mentioned in Boase's 'Collectanea Cornub.,' p. 251. Several letters by Flindell are in Jonathan Edwards Ryland's 'Kitto,' pp. 124–9, 155; Polwhele's 'Traditions and Recollections,' ii. 778–81; 'Reminiscences,' i. 125–6; and 'Biographical Sketches in Cornwall,' ii. 57. 'A man of strong understanding, though by no means polished or refined,' was Polwhele's estimate of Flindell's character.
