= East Cornwall Times =

The East Cornwall Times was a weekly local newspaper. It was first published in 1859. It covered the mid-East area of Cornwall, including Gunnislake and Drakewalls, Callington, Calstock and Kelly Bray. In 1877 it was incorporated into the Cornish & Devon Post.

On 22 July 1865, the newspaper reported that the Trago Gunpowder mills in Cornwall had exploded.

== Successor ==
It is now owned by the Tindle Newspaper Group, and published instead as an offshoot of the Tavistock Times.
