= Cornish & Devon Post =

Newspaper published in Cornwall, England

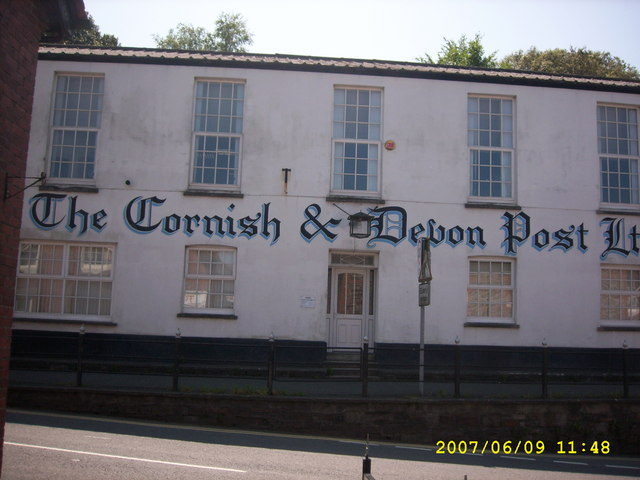
- Offices of the Cornish & Devon Post
- Type: Weekly newspaper
- Owner(s): Tindle Newspaper Group
- Founded: 1856
- Circulation: 2,626 (as of 2023)
- Website: thepost.uk.com

The Cornish & Devon Post is a weekly newspaper, published in Launceston, Cornwall, England, which was launched in 1856. It was one of the last newspapers in the UK to carry advertisements, rather than news on the front page. It is owned by the Tindle Newspaper Group since 1986.

It covers the main towns of Launceston, Bude, Holsworthy and Camelford and the area of northwest Devon and northeast Cornwall.

In 1877, the East Cornwall Times was incorporated into the Post.

In April 2020, after 164 years, the paper made the switch from broadsheet to tabloid, with news appearing on the front page for the first time.
