= The Cornish Times =

- Type: Weekly newspaper
- Owner: Tindle Newspaper Group
- Founded: 1857
- City: Liskeard, Cornwall
- Circulation: 2,601 (as of 2023)
- Website: cornish-times.co.uk

The Cornish Times (founded 1857) is a weekly newspaper in Cornwall, South West England, owned by the Tindle Newspaper Group.

Headquartered at Webb's House in Liskeard, Cornwall, The Cornish Times displays as an emblem a Cornish chough on its front page. Published nowadays every Wednesday, it is edited by Zoë Uglow.

== History ==
The Cornish Times was first published on Saturday 3 January 1857. The cover price of the first edition was one old penny. Unlike today, it covered local and national as well as international news. Articles in the first edition included:

- St. Petersburg, on a Convention between Russia and Persia
- Copper ore for sale in Redruth
- Mining information and activity in Cornwall
- The Address of the President of the United States
- Crime in Tyne and Wear, England
- The state of Nicaragua
- Details of the execution of child murderer William Jackson, of Chester, England.

A complete set of microfilm copies of The Cornish Times can be examined at the Cornish Studies Centre in Redruth. Its first proprietors were Edward Philp of Callington and John Philp of Liskeard.

=== Webb's Hotel ===
The current office building, where The Cornish Times is based, was built in 1833 as a hotel.

Webb's Hotel was used for meetings of South Caradon Mine. Under Cornish Stannary Laws cost-book system, two monthly meetings were held at which the purser presented the accounts, where profits were shared and debts (or 'calls') were settled. Mine owners' names were held in 'cost books', from which their entry could be deleted after settling outstanding calls; the system existed until 1883. Webb's Hotel featured in royal visits, parliamentary declarations and much more, before being converted into flats and offices.

A grade II* listed building, the abandoned hotel fell derelict by 1989, but was purchased by a property developer in 2001 and restored to its original splendour, being reopened in 2005. Now no longer a hotel, the building is renamed Webb's House, and its front gardene re-landscaped with granite seats, flower borders and a Celtic cross.
