= Derry's Clock Tower =

Clock tower in Plymouth, England

Clock Tower
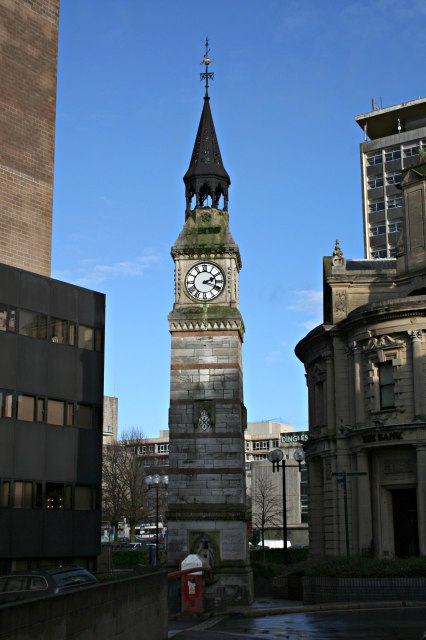
- Derry's Clock Tower

- Location within central Devon
- 50.369549°N 4.144645°W
- Location: Plymouth, Devon, United Kingdom

History
- Built: 8 August 1862; 163 years ago
- Built by: Call and Pethick
- Built for: William Derry

Site notes
- Architect: Henry Hall
- Architectural style: Classical

Listed Building – Grade II
- Official name: Clock Tower
- Designated: 1 May 1975
- Reference no.: 1130056

Derry's Clock Tower (or Derry's Cross) is a free-standing clock tower in the city of Plymouth, England.

The clock and the nearby former bank are the only buildings to survive the Blitz and postwar development in the immediate area.

On 1 May 1975, English Heritage listed the clock tower at Grade II for its architectural and historical importance.

== History ==
Built in 1862, it was intended as a personal gift for the Prince of Wales, Albert Edward (the future Edward VII) and Princess Alexandra Caroline Marie Charlotte Louise Julia, the daughter of Christian IX of Denmark. The clock tower was a gift from William Derry (1817–1903), the Mayor of Plymouth between 1861–62.

Prior to the destruction of the area in World War II, the clock stood at a major junction of the city comprising George Street, Union Street and Lockyer Street and was commonly regarded as the centre of Plymouth.

== Present day ==
The structure remains standing in its original location and can be found behind the new Theatre Royal.

The clock in the tower has worked for almost all of its 157-year history, including during the Blitz, but as of 3 September 2019, the clock is not functioning.

The repairs to the clocks internal mechanism were completed and it is again working. The actual date it was restored is unknown but was visually confirmed as working on 22 June 2023.
