= Pitpilot =

Pitpilot is the first magazine solely devoted to the UK surfing scene. The magazine was first published on 12 December 2003. Joe Moran is the founder of the magazine.

Pitpilot is published on a bimonthly basis in Newquay, Cornwall. The owner is Arcwind Ltd, based in Woodstock, Oxfordshire. In 2009 Tony Plant was appointed editor of the magazine.
