= Doncaster Gazette =

Defunct British newspaper

- Format: Weekly
- Founder: Thomas Sanderson
- Founded: 1786
- Ceased publication: 1981
- Political alignment: Liberal Party
- Language: English
- Country: United Kingdom

The Doncaster Gazette, founded as the Yorkshire Journal and General Weekly Advertiser and known until 1882 as the Doncaster, Nottingham and Lincoln Gazette, was a weekly newspaper, established in 1786 by Thomas Sanderson, that served the regions of Yorkshire and Nottinghamshire in England. It had the longest run of any newspaper in Yorkshire, publishing continuously for 195 years from 1786 until its closure in 1981.

== History ==
The Yorkshire Journal and General Weekly Advertiser was founded by Thomas Sanderson, a chemist, in August 1786 to serve Yorkshire, northern Nottinghamshire and London. Sanderson advertised the liquorice he produced in this newspaper. Control of the newspaper passed on to Elizabeth Sanderson, his wife, after he died in 1790; author Guy Schofield suspected that she was the first female newspaper editor.

After Elizabeth's death in 1797, William Sheardown, who owned a competitor newspaper The Yorkshire Nottinghamshire and Lincolnshire Gazette, gave himself a monopoly on newspapers in Yorkshire by purchasing the Yorkshire Journal and General Weekly Advertiser. Sheardown's descendants kept the newspaper until they sold it to Thomas Brooke, a business partner of the Sheardown family, in 1827. During the Brooke family's ownership, a Hatfield family and a White family involved themselves in the operation of the newspaper.

The paper changed names repeatedly; for most of its history before 1882 it was the Doncaster, Nottingham and Lincoln Gazette, though it was at one point the Doncaster, Nottingham and Lincoln Gazette, and Yorkshire, Nottinghamshire and Lincolnshire Advertiser. In 1882 it was renamed to the Doncaster Gazette.

The Doncaster Gazette was sold in 1893 to Joseph Cooke, a journalist who had intermittently owned the Sheffield Independent and a London Morning Herald.

In 1918 the Doncaster Gazette was acquired, along with several other British newspapers, by the Daily Chronicle Investment Corporation, Ltd. (a company, created specifically to buy the newspapers, in which Prime Minister David Lloyd George held an interest). Lloyd George sold his interests in the Corporation in 1927 but stayed in control of the newspapers' editorial policies.

William Harrison, chairman of the Inveresk Paper Company, purchased the Doncaster Gazette and the other Daily Chronicle Investment Corporation newspapers in 1928.

In 1964 the Doncaster Gazette merged with the Doncaster Chronicle to become the Doncaster Gazette and Chronicle, though it remained known as the Doncaster Gazette.

In January of 1981 the Doncaster Gazette's manager J. G. S. Linacre announced that, due to an economic recession, continuing to operate the newspaper would incur a loss of over 400,000 pounds sterling by the year's end. The Doncaster Gazette ceased publication that same month, by which point it had become "Yorkshire's oldest newspaper" for having published continuously for 195 years.

== Political alignment ==
The Doncaster Gazette aligned itself with the Liberal Party, and in the 19th century it supported the Reform Bill and backed the Liberal statesman John Bright. During its ownership by the Daily Chronicle Investment Corporation, David Lloyd George made sure that the publication continued to uphold the Liberal Party and the values of progressive liberalism.

== Archival ==
In 1923 four issues, one from 1805 and three from 1814, of the Doncaster, Nottingham and Lincoln Gazette were given to the Wisconsin Historical Museum by a Mrs H. H. Willard. The 1814 issues covered the naval actions of the War of 1812 and, according to the Hartford Times's article about the issues, the exile of Napoleon to St Helena alongside mundane news such as accident reports. A new exhibit was created to display the four issues.

In 1935 a genealogical class in Doncaster discovered that the Doncaster Gazette had, since its 1786 inception, kept record of every birth, death and marriage in Doncaster.

== Works cited ==
- Schofield, Guy (1975). The men that carry the news : a history of United Newspapers Limited. London : Cranford Press. ISBN 978-0-904508-00-0.
- Library of Congress (1984). Newspapers in microform : foreign countries, 1948- 1983. Washington, D.C. : Library of Congress.
- The Church of Jesus Christ of Latter-day Saints (22 August 1935). Millennial Star. Manchester ; Liverpool: The Church of Jesus Christ of Latter-day Saints in Great Britain London, 1840-1970.
