= Maroubra Speedway =

Motor racing venue in Sydney, Australia

Coordinates: 33°56′50″S 151°14′36″E

Maroubra Speedway, officially known as Olympia Motor Speedway was a motor racing venue in the Sydney suburb of Maroubra, New South Wales, Australia and was reported to have had a capacity of 70,000.

== Opening ==
It officially opened with its first meeting on Saturday, 5 December 1925,

Among the competitors on that first evening were two women: Marie Jenkins, of Melbourne, in a Brecia Bugatti, and Mrs. J.A.S. Jones, of Lithgow, in a Crossley Sports.

At the speedway's third meeting, on Saturday, 2 January 1926, Jenkins was the first woman to win a final race—i.e., rather than just a heat—at the speedway.

MISCELLANEOUS (16 November 1927)
The Maroubra Speedway has again been sold by auction, and this time realised a price of only £2500.
The history of this speedway is interesting in view of the fact that its area, 70 acres, is leased from the Crown and the contract price for the track and other improvements that are built thereon was £34,000.
In addition to this sum there is an extra amount of about £8000 involved in the installation of electric time-keeping boards and scoring room.
The original company, after a few successful meetings, went into liquidation, and left a large amount of the contract price for the work owing to Master Builder Wm. Hughes.
The Speedway was sold at auction to one of the original shareholders, J. S. Taylor, who paid £10,850 for it.
The refusal of permission to conduct night trotting within the course, however, forced Mr. Taylor to sell to G. W. Taylor, who purchased the Speedway on Monday last.

== The Olympia Motor Speedway ==
The 1 mile banked concrete bowl was the scene of some large and successful race meetings before a decline in attendances saw the track close in 1927, but reopened many times in the 1930s.

Despite the banking being too steep to walk up, it was still not enough for the speeds achieved, and four competitors lost their lives going over the top of banking. Three others also died at the circuit, two of whom were motorcyclists.

The sensationalist media of the day dubbed it a "killer track" which did little to improve the fortunes of the venue.

The speedway continued to operate sporadically in the 1930s but the meetings were not the large affairs held previously.

The track was used for club days, practice, and record attempts; and was also used for testing.

On 14 August 1926 Peter White, driving an S.R. Fronty, set a new track record for cars at 101.3 m.p.h.. This record was never broken.

== Demolition ==
By the 1940s the track was crumbling due to flooding and poor quality concrete. In 1947, it was demolished, and a (1,100 dwelling) housing commission suburb was built on the site, with a park, named Coral Sea Park, developed in what had once been the infield area.

Streets in the new area — e.g., Astoria Circuit (USS Astoria), Chicago Avenue (USS Chicago), Lexington Place (USS Lexington), Morris Place (USS Morris), Neosho Way (USS Neosho), Perkins Street (USS Perkins), Sims Lane and Sims Grove (USS Sims) — were named after Allied ships that had been engaged in the Battle of the Coral Sea.
