= Coral Sea Park =

Park in New South Wales, Australia

- Interactive map of Coral Sea Park
- Location: Yorktown Parade, Maroubra, New South Wales, Australia
- Nearest city: Sydney
- Coordinates: 33°56′52″S 151°14′40″E
- Area: 5.6 hectares (14 acres)
- Created: 1960
- Operator: Randwick Council
- Open: 24 hours
- Status: Open all year
- Public transit: : n/a; : n/a; : Routes #390X, #394X; : n/a

Coral Sea Park is a 5.6-hectare (14-acre) public park in the Eastern Suburbs of Sydney, New South Wales, Australia.

Coral Sea Park is located in the suburb of Maroubra.

== Features ==
Coral Sea Park has a cricket pitch, a basketball court, and several soccer fields and rugby fields. There is also a large playground for children.

Coral Sea Park is an off-leash dog area.

== History ==
The area used to be Maroubra Speedway until it was demolished and renamed in 1947.

Coral Sea Park references the Battle of the Coral Sea of 1942, considered a turning point of World War 2.

Several of the surrounding streets are named after U.S. warships, such as Chicago Avenue, New Orleans Crescent, Yorktown Parade and Astoria Circuit.
