= Nina Eva Vida Jones =

Australian racing motorist (1882–1966)

Vida Jones
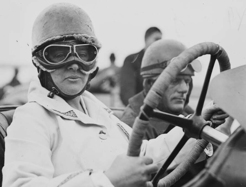
- racing in 1930
- Born: Nina Eva Vida Harris; 30 January 1882; Ultimo, New South Wales
- Died: 2 March 1966 (aged 84); Darling Point
- Other name: Mrs JAS Jones
- Known for: racing cars
- Spouse: John Alexander Stammers Jones
- Children: 2

Nina Eva Vida Jones (née Harris; 30 January 1882 - 2 March 1966), also known as Mrs JAS Jones, was an Australian racing motorist who competed in the 1930s. She was said to be the first woman from New South Wales to compete at motor racing. Her husband John Alexander Stammers Jones was a brewer.

== Life ==
Nina Eva Vida Harris was born on 30 January 1882 in Ultimo, New South Wales. Her parents were Susan Mary (née Clarke) and her husband William Henry Harris. Her father was a gentleman as his family had benefited from a bequest left by second fleeter John Harris. That John Harris left about £150,000 as he had gained a huge estate based at Ultimo, New South Wales. Jones was born at Ultimo and she was home schooled.

In 1910 she married John Alexander Stammers Jones who was a keen sportsman and he owned the Zig Zag Brewery, ten hotels and, in time, two Darracq cars. Their home at Lithgow which was near the brewery until they had a house built at Darling Point which they named Nia Heymo. She first drove in a Chandler Motor Car. In 1923 she went on a tour in her car and entered a reliability trial. She began competing in events organised by the Royal Automobile Club of Australia and in 1925 she bought a Crossley Motors 20-70 model. The car had a 3.7 litre engine and was said to have a top speed of 75 mph. She won a Weekender trophy at Maroubra Speedway in that car at an average speed of 78 mph. She was said to be the first woman from New South Wales to compete at motor racing.

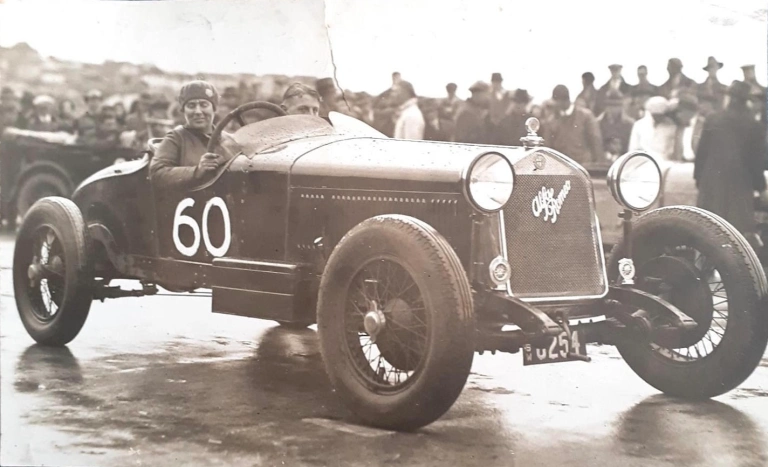
Vida Jones and her Alfa Romeo during the Bondi Sprint meeting in June 1930

In 1928 her husband sold his brewery and they went on holiday to Europe. While in Italy she saw "real" racing involving Bugattis, Sunbeams and Bentleys. In 1929 she viewed an Alfa Romeo 6C Zagato in Italy and she had the car imported into Australia. In 1930 she beat 67 other (male) drivers at Bondi Beach where her car covered the quarter mile in 18.4 seconds.

At Gerringong the crowd came too close at the finishing line and she hit a spectator giving him a broken leg. Her daughter, Vidie, competed in her Lea-Francis car, and her son also drove the Alfa Romeo. The Alfa Romeo car nearly ended its racing following an accident in 1933. She had been cornering at high speed when a tyre was punctured and the car rolled several times. She and her daughter were thrown out and they had only minor injuries, but the car was burned out. The car was recovered and restored with new parts sent from Italy and in 1934 she had her last accident at a hill climb in Newcastle. Her son was driving when they crashed into an embankment. Jack was unhurt but she gave up competition after she spent six weeks recovering from a broken thigh.

In 1934 her husband died and their son Jack died in a plane accident. Only her daughter was still racing but she retired when she married.

Jones died in Darling Point in 1966.

Nina Jones Crescent, in the Canberra suburb of Chisholm, is named in her honour.
