= Ultimo Substation =

Electrical substation in Australia

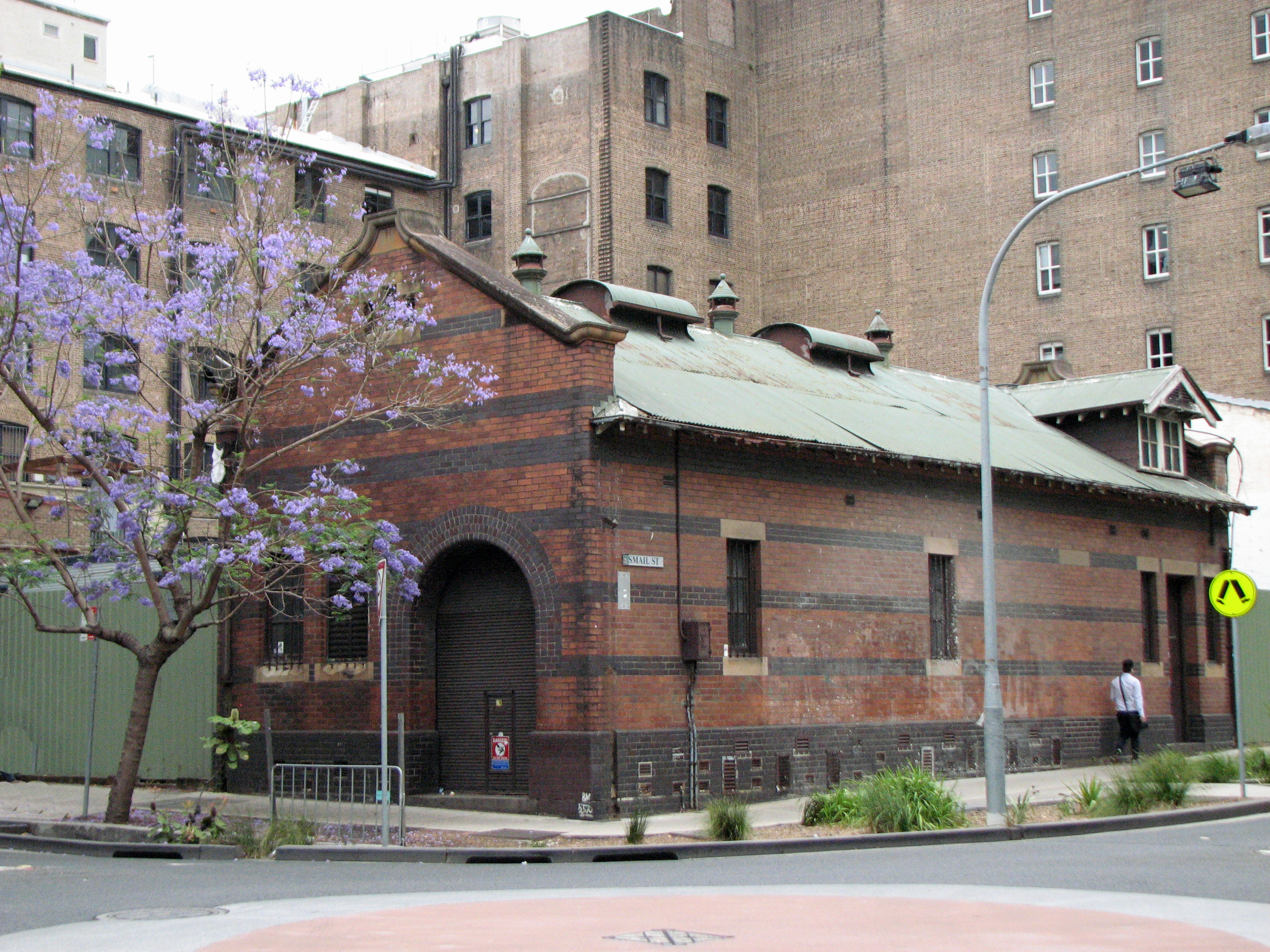
- Ultimo Electrical Substation, 41 Mountain Street, Ultimo, New South Wales

- Location within Sydney Location within Australia
- 33°52′58″S 151°11′46″E
- Location: 41 Mountain Street, Ultimo, City of Sydney, New South Wales, Australia

History
- Built: 1906

Site notes
- Architectural style: Federation Free Style
- Owner: Ausgrid

New South Wales Heritage Register
- Official name: Substation; #5 Mountain Street
- Type: State heritage (built)
- Designated: 2 April 1999
- Reference no.: 934
- Type: Electricity Transformer/Substation
- Category: Utilities – Electricity

The Ultimo Substation is a heritage-listed electrical substation located at 41 Mountain Street in the inner city Sydney suburb of Ultimo in the City of Sydney local government area of New South Wales, Australia. It was built in 1906. It is also known as #5 Mountain Street. The property is owned by Ausgrid, an agency of the Government of New South Wales. It was added to the New South Wales State Heritage Register on 2 April 1999.

== History ==
The Mountain Street substation is a purpose designed and built structure constructed c. 1906.

== Description ==
The Mountain Street substation is an unusual tuck pointed face brick structure on a corner site, designed in the Federation Free Style evidenced by the use of a sandstone window headers, sill detailing and gabled parapet with curvilinear elements and contrasting manganese banded brick parapet. Stylistic elements also include a large arched entrance flanked by a ventilator and a multi paned window in the gabled wall and a pitched roof with exposed rafters. It is located within the Pyrmont/Ultimo Urban Conservation Area. The Mountain Street substation is constructed using load bearing face brick and sandstone block for the parapet. The main entrance is incorporates a brick arch. The windows are multi paned and the main entrance is a steel roller shutter.

The external materials used were face brick, sandstone block, with a steel roller shutter.

=== Condition ===
As at 10 November 2000, the condition of the building was good.

== Heritage listing ==
As at 10 November 2000, the Mountain Street substation is a rare and early example of an externally intact substation dating from the Federation period.

The Ultimo Substation was listed on the New South Wales State Heritage Register on 2 April 1999.

== See also ==
- Australian non-residential architectural styles
- Ausgrid
- Media related to Ultimo Substation at Wikimedia Commons
