= Ultimo Sewage Pumping Station =

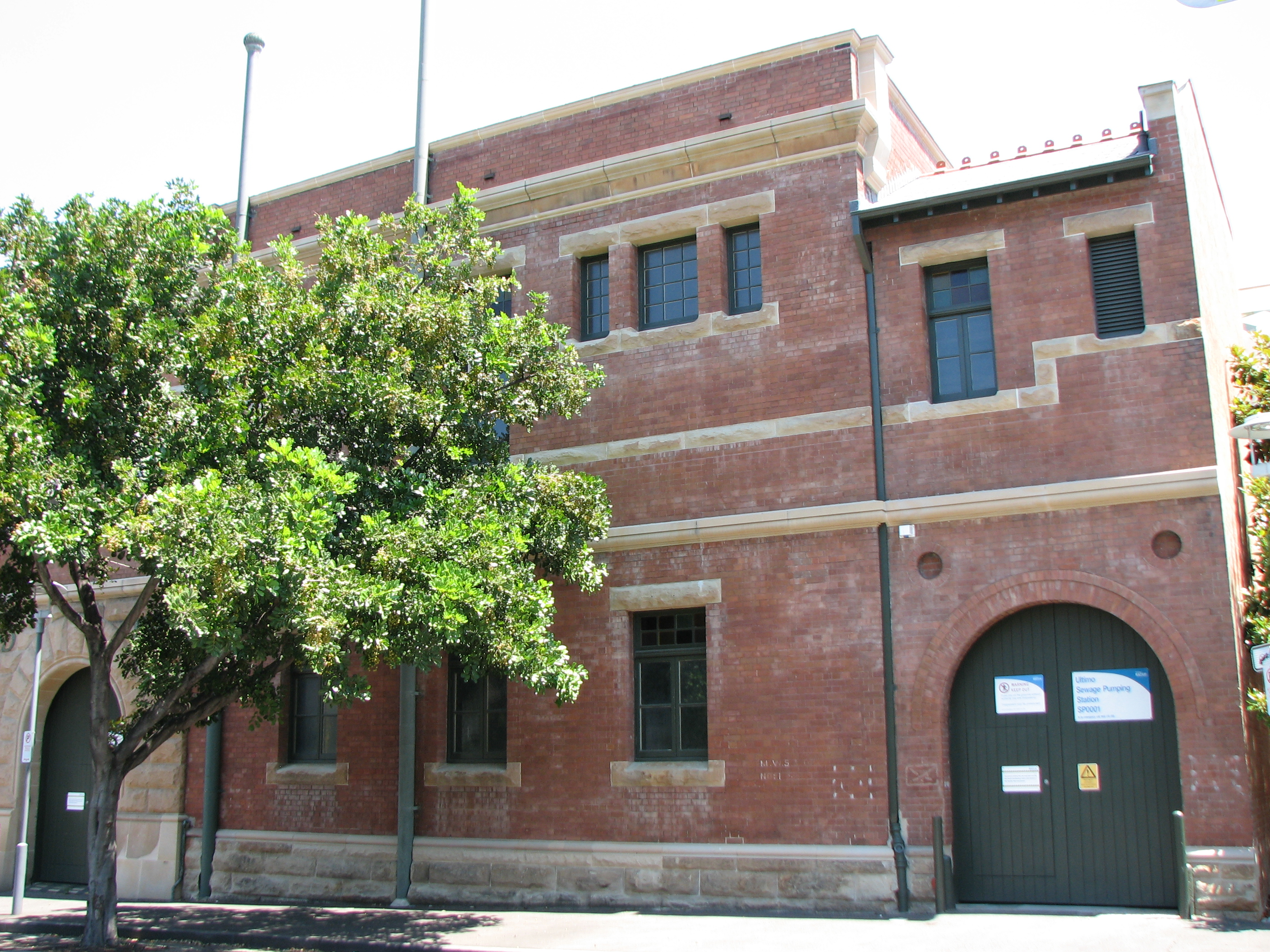
- Ultimo Sewage Pumping Station, Pyrmont Street, Ultimo, NSW

- Location within Sydney Location within Australia
- 33°52′39″S 151°11′57″E
- Location: William Henry Street, Ultimo, New South Wales, Australia

History
- Built: 1899–1902

Site notes
- Architect: New South Wales Department of Public Works
- Architectural style: Federation Free Style
- Owner: Sydney Water

New South Wales Heritage Register
- Official name: Sewage Pumping Station 1; SPS 1; SPS 0001; The Controlling Station
- Type: State heritage (built)
- Designated: 18 November 1999
- Reference no.: 1336
- Type: Sewage Pump House/Pumping Station
- Category: Utilities – Sewerage
- Builders: New South Wales Department of Public Works

The Ultimo Sewage Pumping Station is a heritage-listed sewerage pumping station located at William Henry Street in the inner city Sydney suburb of Ultimo, Sydney, New South Wales, Australia. As a result of the construction of an elevated roadway along William Henry Street, the pumping station now fronts Pyrmont Street, with vehicles being required to enter via Quarry Street, then turning right into Pyrmont Street.

The pumping station was designed and built by the New South Wales Department of Public Works from 1899 to 1902. It is also known as Sewage Pumping Station 1, SPS 1, SPS 0001 and The Controlling Station. The property is owned by Sydney Water.

== History ==
In 1859 Sydney's sewerage system consisted of five outfall sewers which drained to Sydney Harbour. By the 1870s, the harbour had become grossly polluted (especially with the nearby abattoir at Glebe Island) and there were outbreaks of Enteric Fever (typhoid) throughout the period 1870s–1890s. As a result, the Government of New South Wales created the Sydney City and Suburban Health Board to investigate an alternative means of disposing of the City's sewage. This led to the construction of two gravitation sewers in 1889 by the Public Works Department: a northern sewer being the Bondi Ocean Outfall Sewer and a southern sewer draining to a sewage farm at Botany Bay. Low-lying areas around the harbour which could not gravitate to the new outfall sewers continued to drain to the old City Council Harbour sewers. Low level pumping stations were therefore needed to collect the sewage from such areas and pump it by means of additional sewers known as rising mains, to the main gravitation system. The first comprehensive low level sewerage system began at the end of the 19th century when the Public Works Department built a network of twenty low level pumping stations around the foreshores of the inner harbour and handed them over to the Metropolitan Board of Water Supply and Sewerage in 1904. SP0001 was the first and largest of these twenty stations and originally took the sewage from the City area in the Haymarket and on the south-western side of Darling Harbour. It was also the controlling station from which 17 of the other stations were manually controlled, although this function ceased about 1918. At least two of the early stations received their DC power from the Rushcutters Bay Tramway Powerhouse, near SP0018. Although called SPS No 1, the first SPS was the 1894 emergency Shone Ejector at St Peters (coal fired electricity) followed by the Double Bay Compressed Air Ejector Station (electricity from Rushcutters Bay) and the coal fired steam driven Marrickville Pumping Station (later SPS 271). Overall, greater Sydney now has over 600 low level sewage pumping stations.

== Description ==
The pumping station consists of two parts: a superstructure comprising a rectangular two-storey loadbearing brick building; and a substructure constructed of concrete which houses machinery and sewage chambers. Architecturally, the building was designed in a restrained version of the Federation Free Style, exploiting the contrasts of surface and colour inherent in good brickwork and sandstone. Classical elements are evident in the symmetrical facade, the round-arched door openings and the echoes of balustrading in the parapets. Externally there are two principal elevations.

The front of the building addresses William Henry Street and is a symmetrical composition of face brick with sandstone dressings in three bays, the centre one treated as a breakfront accommodating as entrance porch. There are projecting sandstone string courses at first floor level, window sill level and transom level. The parapet has a row of vertical recessed panels on each side of a raised and panelled centre section, giving the breakfront the character of a triumphal arch. The entry bay has a round arch with bullnosed intrados and moulded stone imposts at window transom level. The entrance consists of a pair of original four panel timber doors with fanlight. The Pyrmont Street facade is divided up into three bays, all treated differently to reflect functions within the building. The south bay continues the front facade treatment and is dominated by the entrance lobby which is expressed by a bold frontispiece of rock faced ashlar sandstone above a sandstone plinth.

The frontispiece is penetrated by a Florentine-arched doorway having rock faced voussoirs and a smooth-tooled intrados. The centre bay expresses the former controlling room above and a store room below. The north bay is dominated by a ground floor arch, which is of brick and matches the arch over the William Henry Street entrance. Internally, the ground floor comprises a lobby accessed from Pyrmont Street and containing stairs which provide access the offices above and machinery chamber below. The remainder of this floor consists of storage and loading bay. The first floor comprised three spaces. On the south there was an office, in the middle was a controlling room and to the north there were a lavatory and store room. To the north there is vacant land (formerly the A.M.L.&F.; Wool Warehouse); to the west is another vacant block of land (formerly another woolstore); and to the south is the modern William Henry Bridge (which is higher and greatly enlarged by comparison with the former overbridge that was there when SP001 was erected - in 1900 the footpath of William Henry Street was about level with the upper floor of the Station. Across the road is the Powerhouse Museum (formerly the Ultimo Tramway Power House).

The exterior of the building is substantially intact. Much of the original plant and equipment has been replaced.

=== Modifications and dates ===
The pumping station is substantially intact. Two pair of wrought iron gates have been removed from the arched entrances. Its function as the controlling station for the other 17 stations ceased c. 1918 and the switchboards have been removed from the first floor office. The single storey garage wing attached to the south elevation is an intrusive addition. Most of the mechanical and electrical components were upgraded during the 1970s. Direct current was replaced by alternating current in c. 1918, and it was supplied by the City Council of Sydney Electricity Department which was the forerunner of the Sydney County Council.

== Heritage listing ==
As at 4 May 2005, SP001 is of historic, aesthetic and technical/research significance. Historically it was part of an original network of twenty sewage pumping stations constructed in Sydney at the end of the 19th century. The station was a key component of this network, being the largest and controlling station for the performance of the other first generation stations. The station is also historically significant for its associations with the Bondi Ocean Outfall Sewer (BOOS) which was Sydney's first ocean outfall. The construction of SP001 and the BOOS (ten years earlier) formed a part of the major advance in the protection of the public health of Sydney by ending the discharge of sewage into the harbour. They were built as a direct response to the outbreaks of Enteric Fever (Typhoid) which plagued Sydney from the 1870s to 1890s and the recommendations of the Sydney City and Suburban Health Board (which was established by the Government in 1875 to report on the best means of sewage disposal) which proposed the establishment of outfall sewers. Aesthetically it is an excellent example of a substantial and prominent industrial building designed in the Federation Free Style which due to its scale, colour, texture and location has considerable streetscape value.

In its surviving fabric SP0001 provides evidence of technical excellence in traditional construction techniques and craftsmanship, such as the stone dressings around the entrance openings. Technically, the underground areas of the station are significant, being an early example of the use of reinforced concrete usage within Australia. It has educational potential in revealing the development of sewage pumping engineering works and architectural taste in a period when utilitarian buildings were given as much careful attention as public buildings. It is also technically significant for its continual use as a low level sewage pumping station as originally designed and constructed, albeit with mechanical and electrical upgrading. Originally it was supplied with direct current from the nearby Tramway's Department Powerhouse.

Sewage Pumping Station 1 was listed on the New South Wales State Heritage Register on 18 November 1999 having satisfied the following criteria.

The place is important in demonstrating the course, or pattern, of cultural or natural history in New South Wales.

SP0001, Ultimo was built in 1900 and was the first of the original network of twenty low level sewage pumping stations constructed to serve Sydney. The pumping stations along with the construction of the Bondi and Southern Outfall Sewers, formed a part of the major advance in the protection of the public health of Sydney by ending the discharge of sewage into the harbour. The construction of SP0001 (along with the other first generation stations) evidences the growth of Central Sydney and expansion of municipal services during the early part of the 20th century. Built in 1900, it also served as a controlling station for the other 17 first generation stations in the area. It consequently remained as the administrative headquarters for inner city "Minor Electric Pumping Stations".

The place is important in demonstrating aesthetic characteristics and/or a high degree of creative or technical achievement in New South Wales.

The building is an unusual industrial example of the Federation Free Style of architecture in New South Wales. It displays a combination of utilitarian design, architectural qualities and craftsmanship. The scale, colour, texture and detail of the building contribute to the streetscape of Ultimo.

The place has a strong or special association with a particular community or cultural group in New South Wales for social, cultural or spiritual reasons.

Item is listed on the National Trust (NSW) register and is thus recognised by an identifiable group, and as such has importance to the broader community. The excellent design of the building by the Department of Public Works reflects the body of work emanating from the then Government Architect, Walter Liberty Vernon.

The place has potential to yield information that will contribute to an understanding of the cultural or natural history of New South Wales.

SP0001 is structurally significant as it demonstrates in its underground construction the early and superior exploitation of concrete which contributes to the understanding of the development and use of this material in Australia. From 1904 to 1918 it fulfilled an ingenious role, which reflects the enterprise of the engineers of that time. It functioned as the Controlling Station which monitored the performance of 17 other pumping stations. The pumping station still fulfils its role, nearly a century after its introduction, as a low level sewage pumping station as originally designed and constructed albeit with some mechanical upgrading. The original pumps were of the "plunger" type. This technique was prone to wear and blockages and was eventually replaced by centrifugal pumping units powered by AC motors and each station individually controlled. The same power source, although for electric trams, was utilised for opening and closing of the Pyrmont Bridge.

The place possesses uncommon, rare or endangered aspects of the cultural or natural history of New South Wales.

SP0001 is unique as part of the network of first generation low level sewage pumping stations built to serve the historically significant Bondi Ocean Outfall Sewer. As the controlling station for the first generation of SPSs, SP0001 is unique in NSW.

The place is important in demonstrating the principal characteristics of a class of cultural or natural places/environments in New South Wales.

The superstructure is a representative example (in construction) of a large-scale Federation Free Style industrial building. SP0001 is a representative example of a low level sewage pumping station on the Bondi Ocean Outfall Sewer.
