= Ultimo Post Office =

Ultimo Post Office (former)
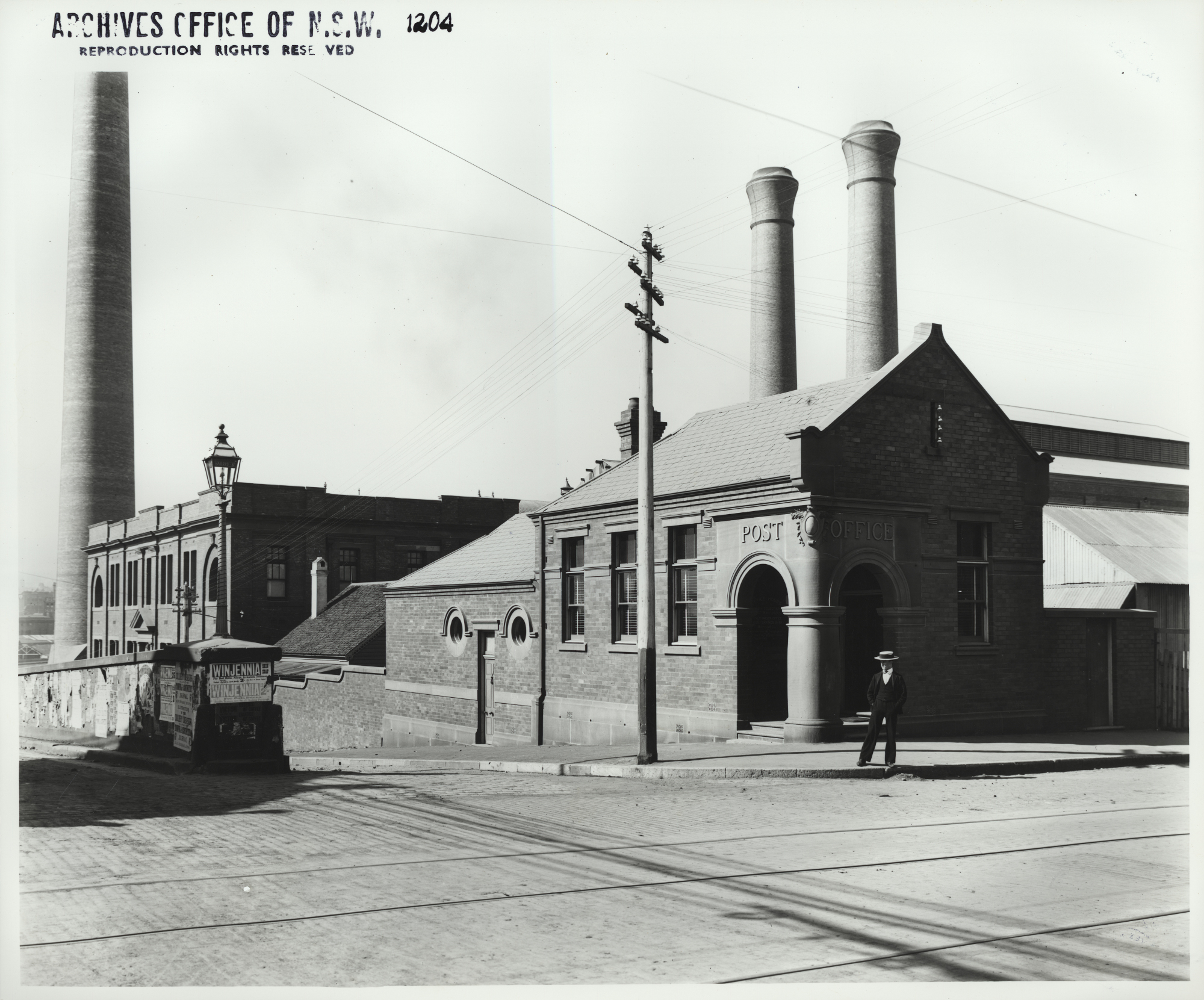
- Ultimo Post Office (Ultimo Power House behind)

- Location within Sydney Location within Australia
- 33°52′40″S 151°11′56″E
- Location: 494 Harris Street, Ultimo, City of Sydney, New South Wales, Australia

History
- Built: 1901

Site notes
- Architect: Walter Liberty Vernon
- Architectural styles: Federation Classical; Federation Romanesque
- Owner: Trustees of the Museum of Applied Arts and Science

New South Wales Heritage Register
- Official name: Ultimo Post Office
- Type: State heritage (built)
- Designated: 2 April 1999
- Reference no.: 502
- Type: Post Office
- Category: Postal and Telecommunications

The Ultimo Post Office is a heritage-listed former post office located at 494 Harris Street in the inner city Sydney suburb of Ultimo in the City of Sydney local government area of New South Wales, Australia. The property is owned by Trustees of the Museum of Applied Arts and Science, an agency of the Government of New South Wales. It was added to the New South Wales State Heritage Register on 2 April 1999.

== History ==
The peninsula of Pyrmont/Ultimo was, by 1818, consolidated as two major landholdings, with the Ultimo area owned by Surgeon John Harris, who built the large residence Ultimo House at the southern end of his property. The land passed to his two brothers in a complicated bequest which made subdivision impractical until the property passed to the next generation of heirs in 1856. Ultimo was largely leased as farmland until this time, but when residential subdivision occurred the building and occupation of houses was rapid. The Harris family built housing both for sale and for tenancy and a number of industrial concerns also became established in the area. Pyrmont was already a thriving industrial and residential area by the middle of the century. The 1880s brought the first woolstores to Ultimo, the 1890s ushered in the Tramway Power House and, by the turn of the century, with the population of the peninsula at its peak, large blocks of housing were being purchased for replacement by the massive woolstores which came to dominate the area in the twentieth century. As these and the associated wharves and railyards declined in activity after World War II, Ultimo's population declined further and by the 1980s, redevelopment of the former industrial sites for office, commercial and residential purposes became the most visible activity of the area. Designed by the Public Works Department's Government Architect's Branch under Walter Liberty Vernon in 1900, the post office was built in 1901. Contractor was G. W. Brewer of Marrickville and the cost of construction was just over A£808. The building opened on 16 July 1901. It operated until the 1980s when it was converted to a childcare centre.

== Description ==
The former Ultimo Post Office is a single storey brick building with ashlar and moulded stone dressings and a slate clad roof. The Harris Street (western) end has a parapeted gable which has stone coping finishing in segmental shoulders and topped with a frustum apex stone. On the gable there is a quarry faced frieze above a chink with a stone sill. At the eastern end the roof is of gabled hip form. Windows are mainly double hung sashes with highlights above. A major feature is the stone, arched entry porch on the corner. It is double faceted and has ornate impost mouldings and archivolts. Above the corner is an embellished cartouche. The eastern section of the building (lower than the post office due to the falling ground) was originally the postmaster's residence. The former entrance here is flanked by oculi each with stone reveal and label mould. This elevation continues easterly as a stepped brick wall (with stone coping) to the back yard. A corbelled chimney with two pots rises from the roof of the building. The building reflects aspects of both Federation Classical and Federation Romanesque design, elements of the latter being the parapeted gable, the large semicircular opening in the porch and the building's simple massing. The former post office is located on a major intersection in Ultimo and with its styling it forms an important element in the streetscape. Further it emphasises the large scale of the former Power House (now the Power House Museum) behind.

== Heritage listing ==
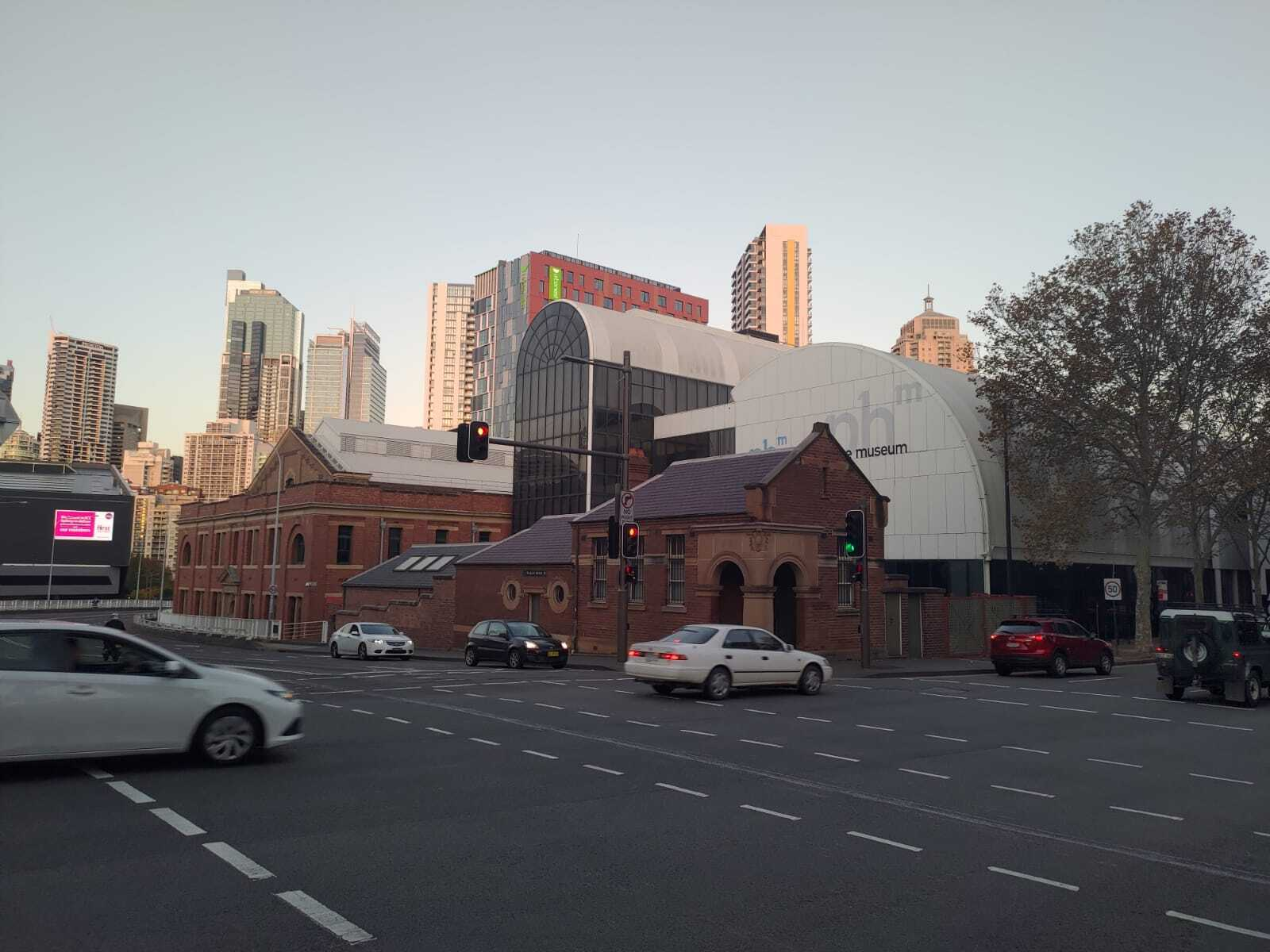
Ultimo Post Office, Sydney. (May 2020)

Ultimo Post Office was listed on the New South Wales State Heritage Register on 2 April 1999.

The former Ultimo Post Office, built in 1901, is historically significant for its associations with the development of Ultimo/Pyrmont as a predominantly industrial and warehouse precinct by the turn of the century. Construction of the post office helps to reflect the degree of development and consolidation by that time. The building reflects characteristics of Federation Classical and Federation Romanesque architectural styles and is important for its connection with NSW Government Architect Walter Liberty Vernon. Owing to its styling and its location on a major intersection, the former post office is an important element in the Ultimo streetscape. Further, it emphasises the scale of the former Ultimo Power Station (now the Powerhouse Museum) behind.

== See also ==
- Powerhouse Museum
