= Ultimo, New South Wales =

Ultimo
- Suburb
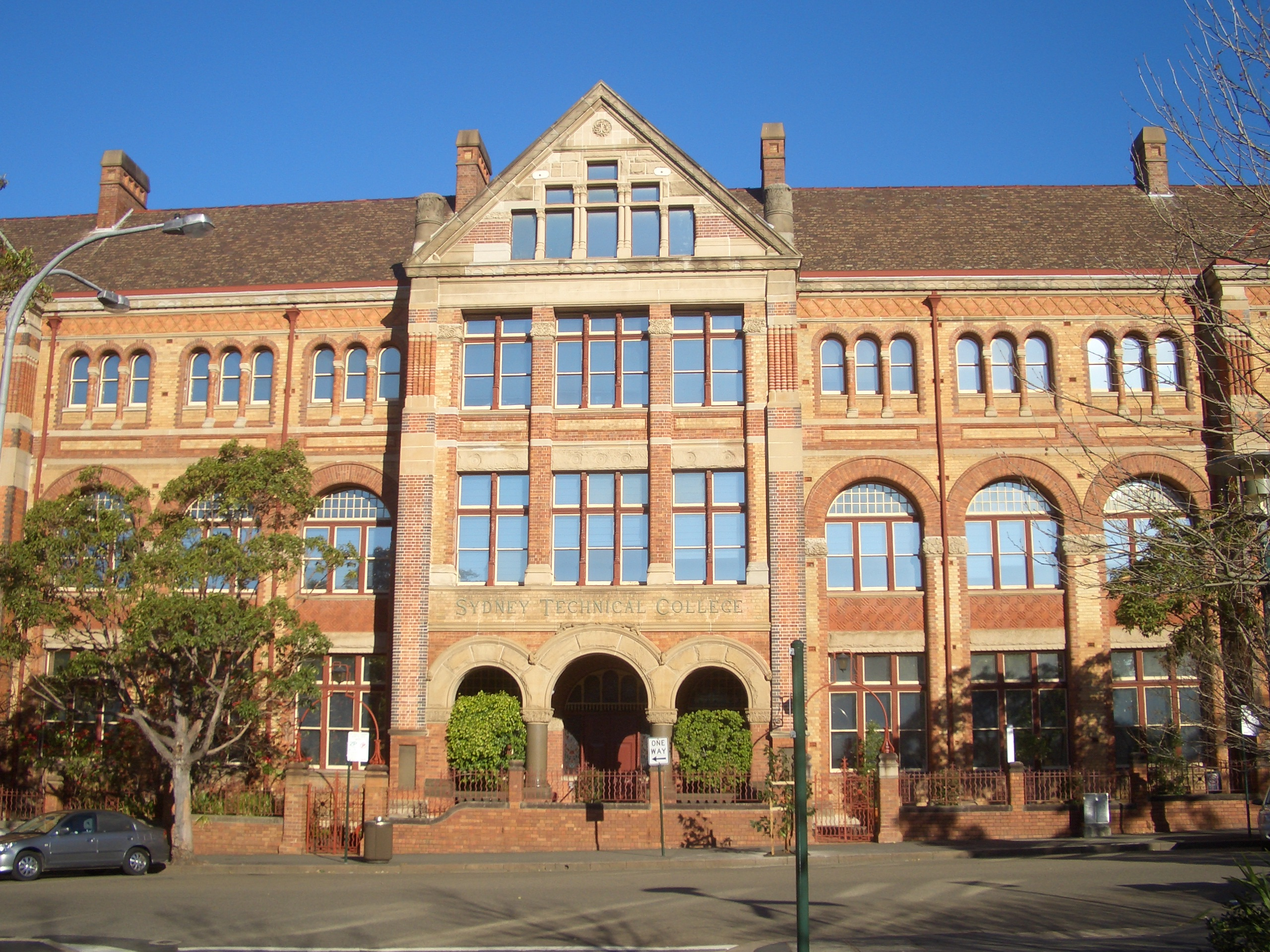
- Sydney Institute of TAFE, Harris Street

- Interactive map of Ultimo
- Coordinates: 33°52′56″S 151°11′49″E
- Country: Australia
- State: New South Wales
- City: Sydney
- LGA: City of Sydney
- Location: 2 km (1.2 mi) from Sydney CBD

Government
  - State electorates: Balmain; Sydney
  - Federal division: Sydney

Area
  - Total: 0.56 km^{2} (0.22 sq mi)
- Elevation: 26 m (85 ft)

Population
  - Total: 7,410 (SAL 2021)
  - Density: 13,232/km^{2} (34,270/sq mi)
- Postcode: 2007
Suburbs around Ultimo
Glebe	Pyrmont	Sydney CBD
Glebe	Ultimo	Haymarket
Camperdown	Chippendale	Haymarket

Ultimo is an inner-city suburb of Sydney, New South Wales, Australia. It is adjacent to the Sydney central business district in the local government area of the City of Sydney west of the Darling Harbour area, and is bordered by Pyrmont to the north, the Sydney CBD and Chinatown/Haymarket to the east, Broadway and Chippendale to the south, and Glebe and Wentworth Park to the west.

Ultimo is considered to be the leading technology, media and startup hub of Sydney, with the University of Technology Sydney, TAFE NSW Ultimo and JMC Academy having campuses within the suburb. Ultimo boasts the highest density of startups in Australia and is a central pillar of the NSW Government's Tech Central precinct. The suburb is also home to the headquarters of the national non-profit organisation, Sydney School of Entrepreneurship.

Broadway is a locality around the road of the same name, which is located on the borders of Ultimo, Chippendale and Glebe.

== History ==
"Ultimo" was originally the name of the estate of Dr John Harris, on 14 hectares (34 acres) granted to him by Governor King in 1803, for his military service and for aiding the governor in curtailing the illegal trading of rum by a corrupt group in the NSW Corps (the Rum Corps). It was named for a clerical error in a legal case against Harris that had prevented him being court-martialled. The court-martial based on fictitious charges was used as a retaliation by the Rum Corps. His offence was listed as "ultimo" (having occurred in the previous month) when it should have been cited as "instant" (having occurred in the same month). Harris Street is named in his honour.

The area remained as farmland, in possession of the Harris family, until it was subdivided in 1859. At that time, most of the current streets were laid out, and the descendants of John Harris constructed the first residences in the area (at least one of which–a row of terraces in Wattle Street–was still owned by the family in the early 1980s).

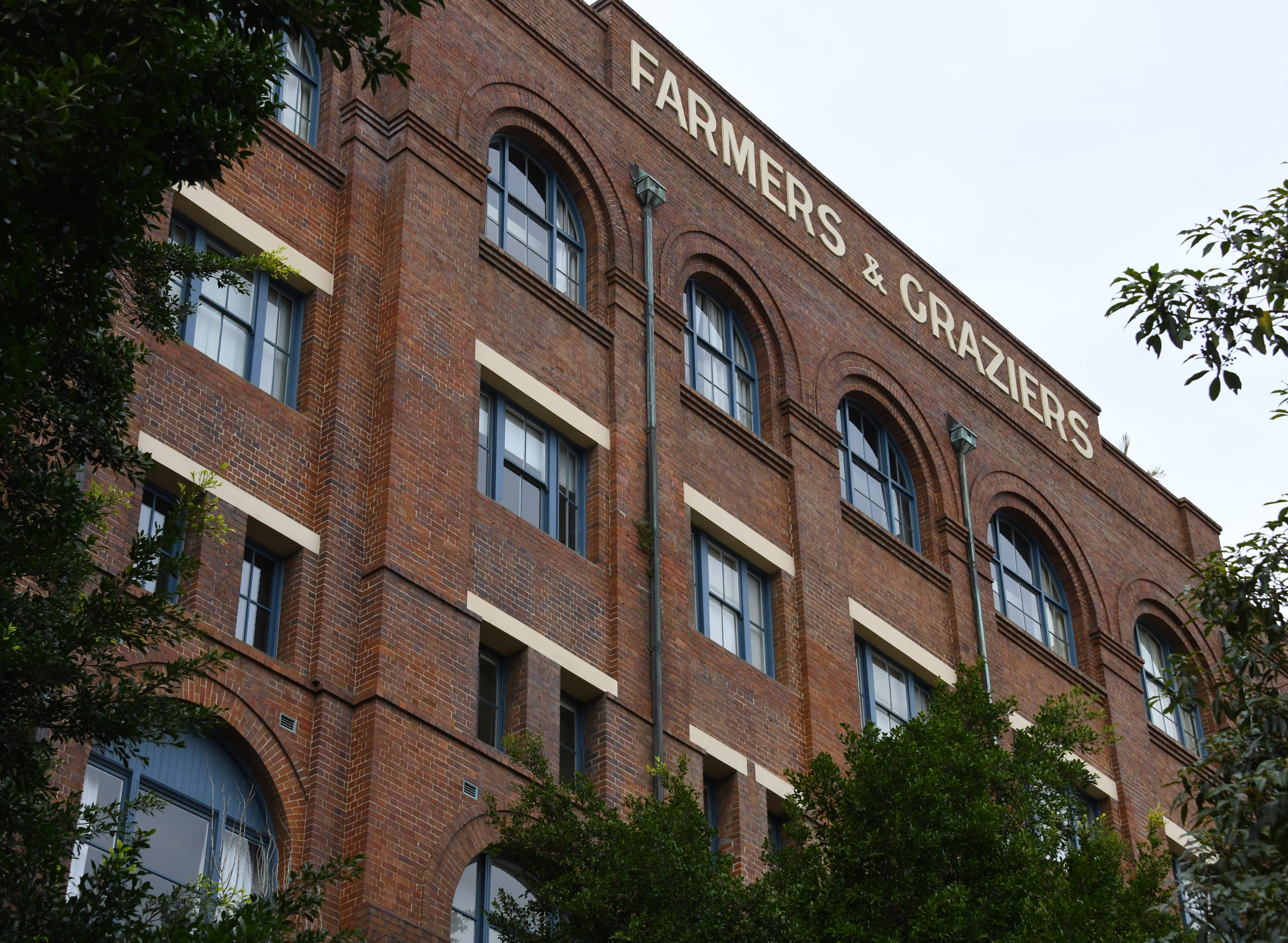
Farmers and Graziers warehouse in Wattle Street, a typical example of the Federation Warehouse style

Residential development accelerated in the 1880s. In 1891 the population of the Pyrmont-Ultimo area was 19,177, in 3,966 dwellings. The population peaked at around 30,000 in 1900. However, the construction of factories, quarries, woolstores and a power station in the early 20th century saw the demolition of hundreds of houses, and a steady decline in population. It was a good site for warehouses because of its proximity to Darling Harbour. Several examples of the Federation Warehouse style can be found along Wattle Street. By 1954, the population of Pyrmont and Ultimo was 5,000, and by 1978 it was just 1,800. For approximately ten years from the early 1950s, Harris Street was home to the head office, recording studio, pressing plant and warehouse of Festival Records, which was Australia's leading independent record company for almost 50 years. Festival moved its facilities to a site in nearby Pyrmont in 1966.

The proposed (and later abandoned) Ultimo Interchange would have resulted in vast destruction of housing in Ultimo. The interchange was planned so "Separation of roadways in the design reduces weaving movements through the interchange area". Alternative freeway proposals were made suggested eliminating the interchange.

In 1973, the Builders Labourers Federation organised a green ban with Pyrmont to stop the construction of the North Western Expressway, which would've destroyed large parts of both suburbs.

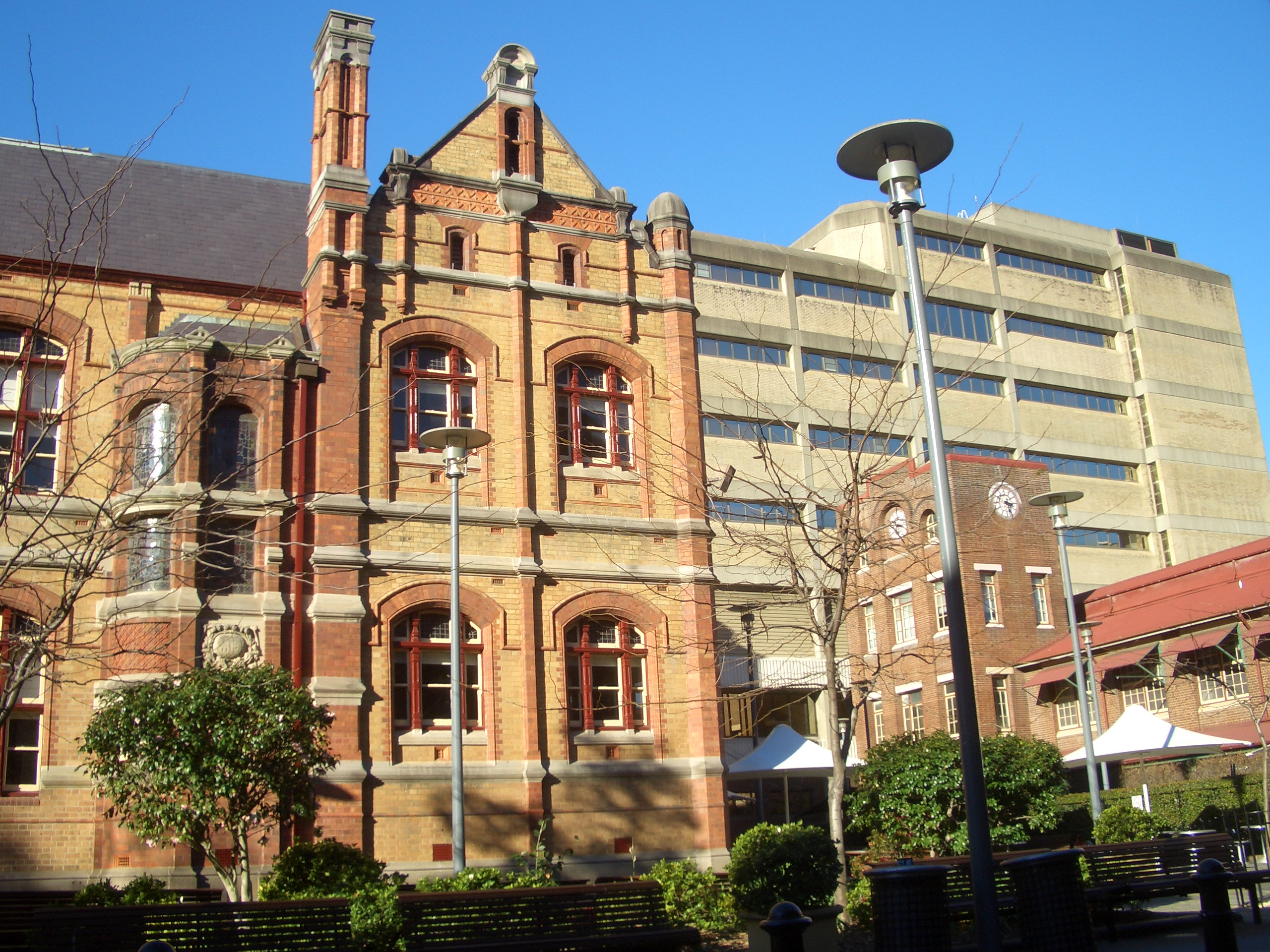
Sydney Institute

Subsequently, many industries began to move to cheaper land further from the CBD, and the decline of the wool industry made Ultimo's 15 woolstores redundant. By the start of the 1980s, derelict industrial sites began to be redeveloped for residences, mostly as apartments, a process that continues to the present.

Very little industry remains in the area, and its current character is a combination of residential and commercial. One conspicuous industrial relic is the brick shell of Davey's Flour Mill, built in 1911, and adjacent to the southern approach to the Anzac Bridge.

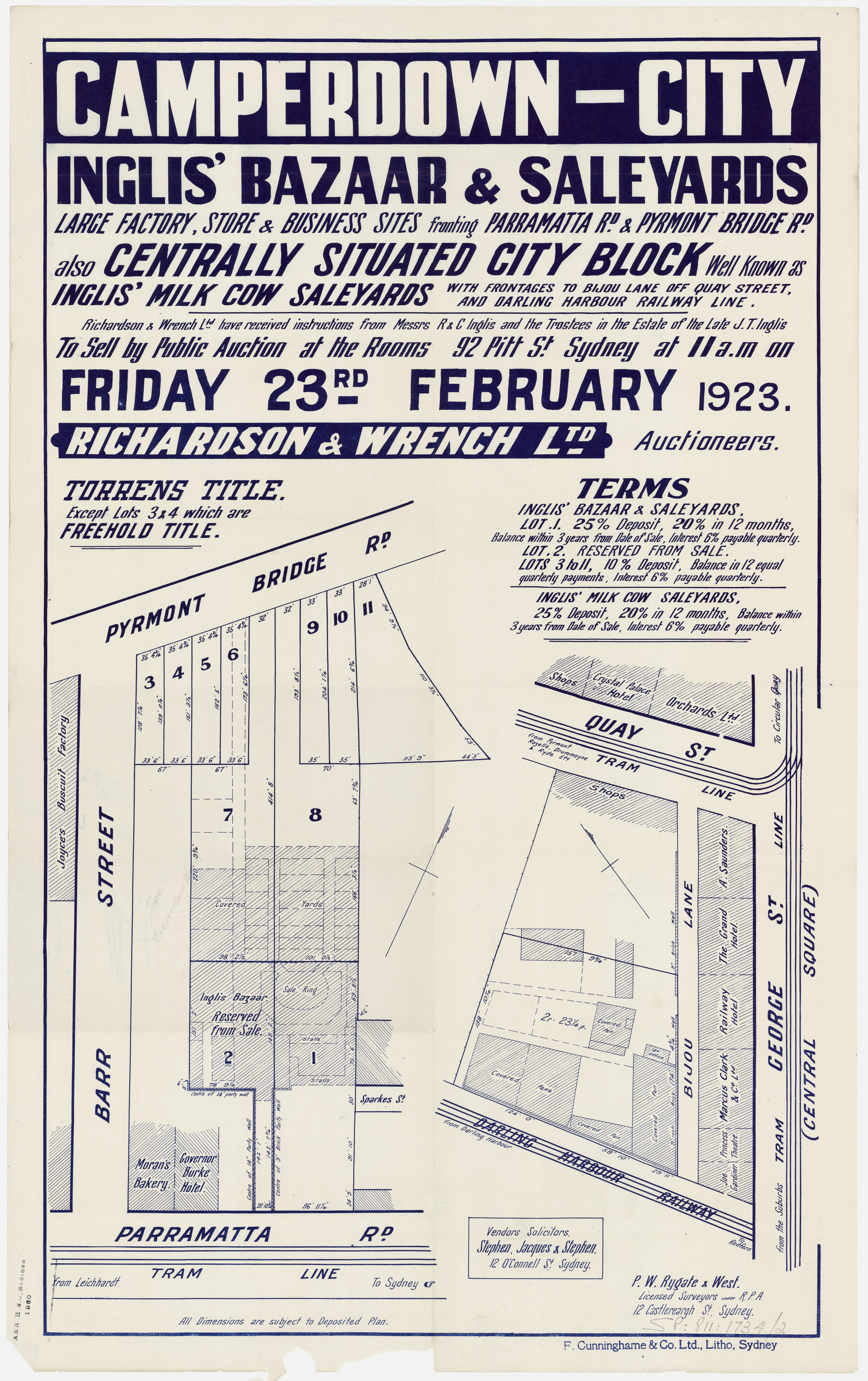
Inglis' Bazaar & Saleyards, George St, Quay St, 1923, F. Cunninghame & Co.

The Dairy Farmer's Cooperative operated from its facility in Harris Street and Ultimo Road from 1912 to its closure in 2009, after which the site was redeveloped by the nearby UTS in a project designed by architect Frank Gehry.

Wentworth Park commenced its life as a creek and swamp, known from the 1830s as Blackwattle Cove Swamp. Wentworth Park became a rugby league oval and the home ground of the Glebe Dirty Reds who were a part of the New South Wales Rugby League premiership back in its inception.

Since 1991, the Australian Broadcasting Corporation has been headquartered in Ultimo.

== Heritage listings ==
Ultimo has a number of heritage-listed sites, including:

- Darling Harbour goods railway: Ultimo Road railway underbridge
- 494 Harris Street: Ultimo Post Office
- 41 Mountain Street: Ultimo Substation
- William Henry Street: Ultimo Sewage Pumping Station

== Churches ==
One of the landmarks in the area is the Uniting Church on the corner of Quarry Street and Bulwara Road. The church was originally built in 1883 to replace the old Presbyterian Church at Mount Street, Pyrmont. The latter had been the first Presbyterian Church in the colony, but it outgrew its old premises and the congregation had to move to the new church in Ultimo. A manse was built a few years later. By 2001 the church was in bad repair and had to be restored with help from a government grant. The church is still active and the congregation goes by the name of The Mustard Seed.

== Commercial area of architecture ==
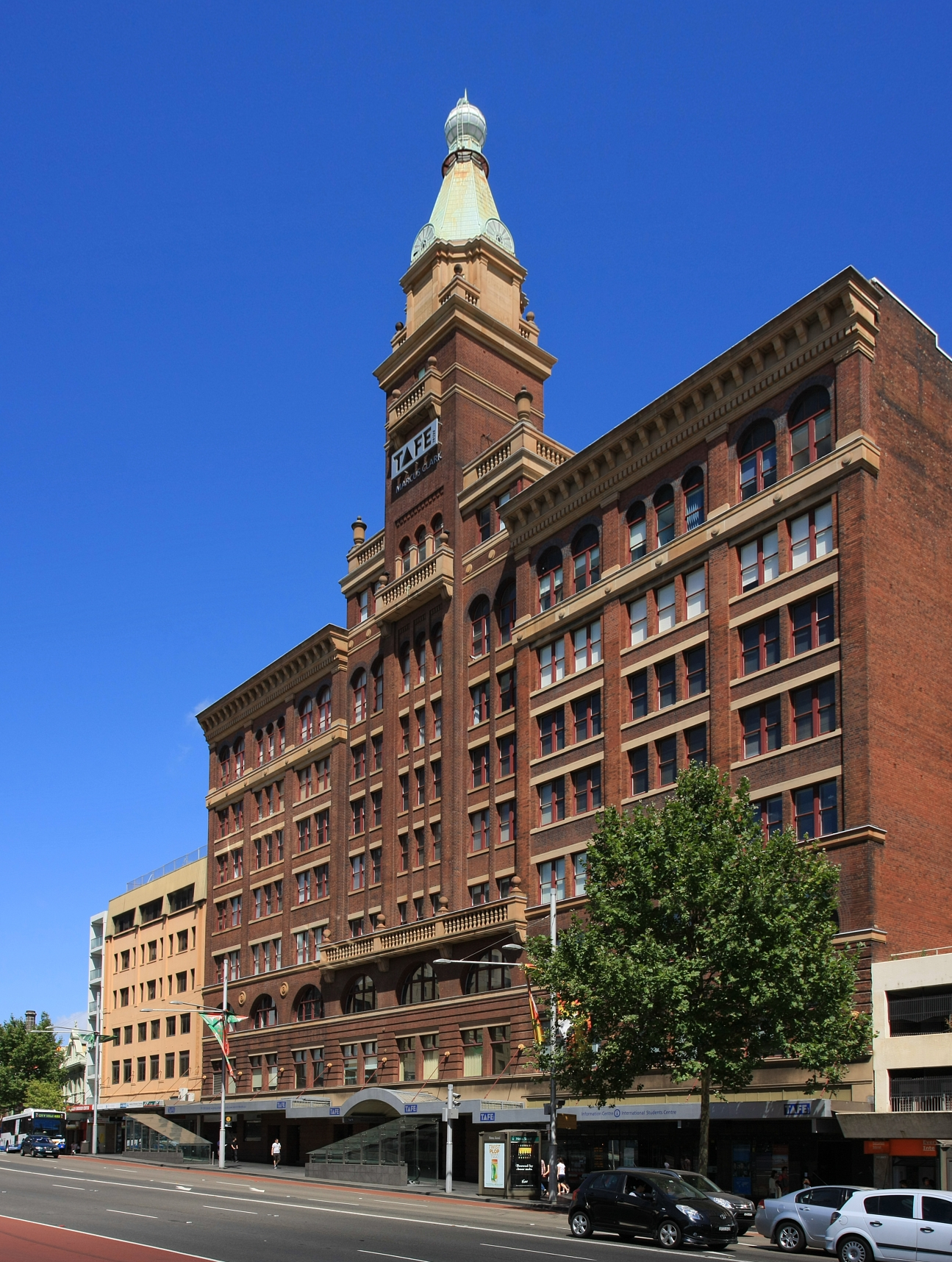
TAFE building (formerly the Marcus Clark building), an example of the Federation Free Classical style of architecture

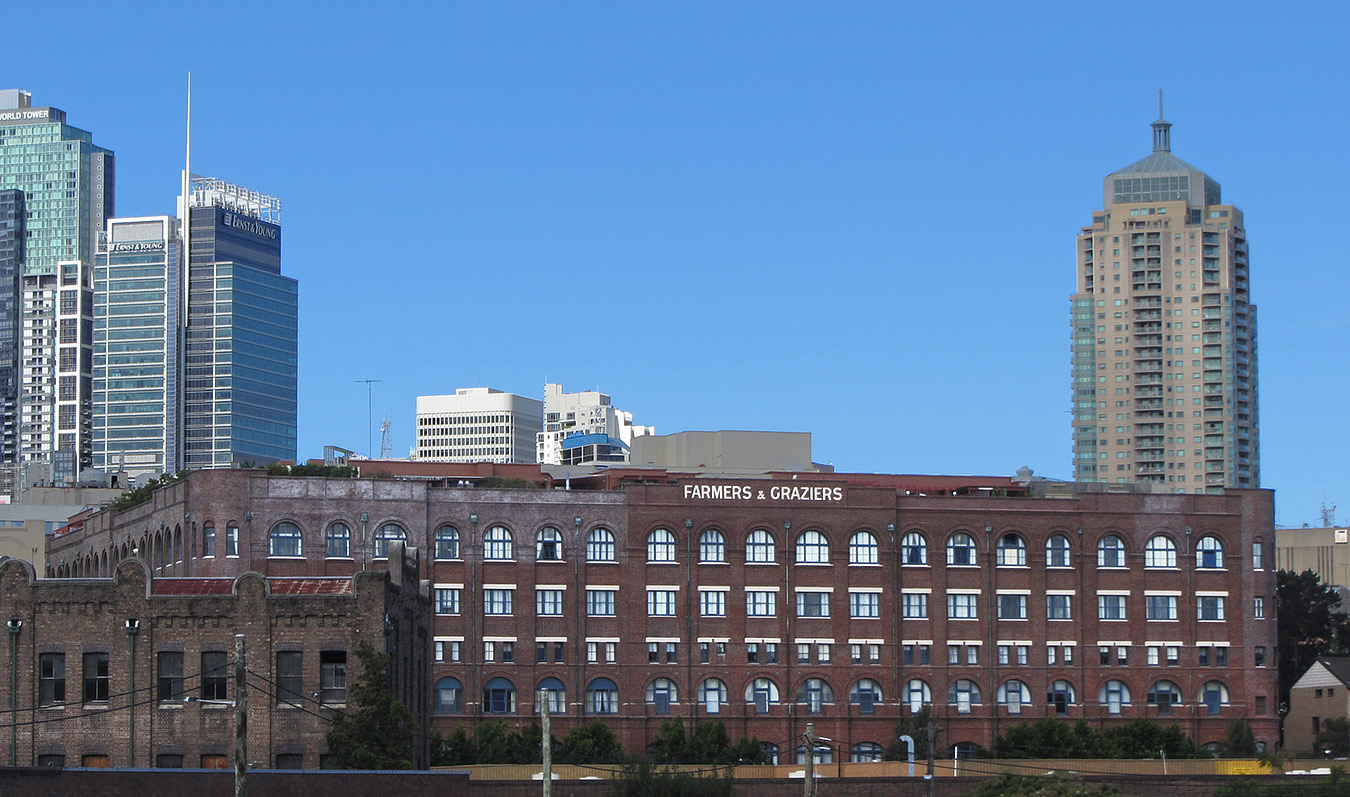
Farmers & Graziers, characteristic of the many warehouses found in Ultimo.

The commercial areas of Ultimo are mainly centred on Broadway, Harris Street and Wattle Street. The Broadway Shopping Centre is located in the former site of the flagship building of the Grace Bros department store chain. The Ultimo area is undergoing gentrification, with considerable redevelopment of industrial buildings for residential and commercial purposes. The NSW transmission network service provider TransGrid is located on Thomas Street.

The corporate headquarters and Sydney studios of the Australian Broadcasting Corporation are located in its Ultimo Centre on Harris Street. The Ultimo Centre also houses an auditorium and recording studio, known as the Eugene Goosens Hall. NITV and Aurora from a digital broadcast centre are located at Ultimo Centre.

Harris Street is also the home of Sydney's Powerhouse Museum. Wentworth Park is a multi-purpose sporting facility in Ultimo that is used for various sports including rugby union, rugby league, soccer and greyhound racing.

== Transport ==
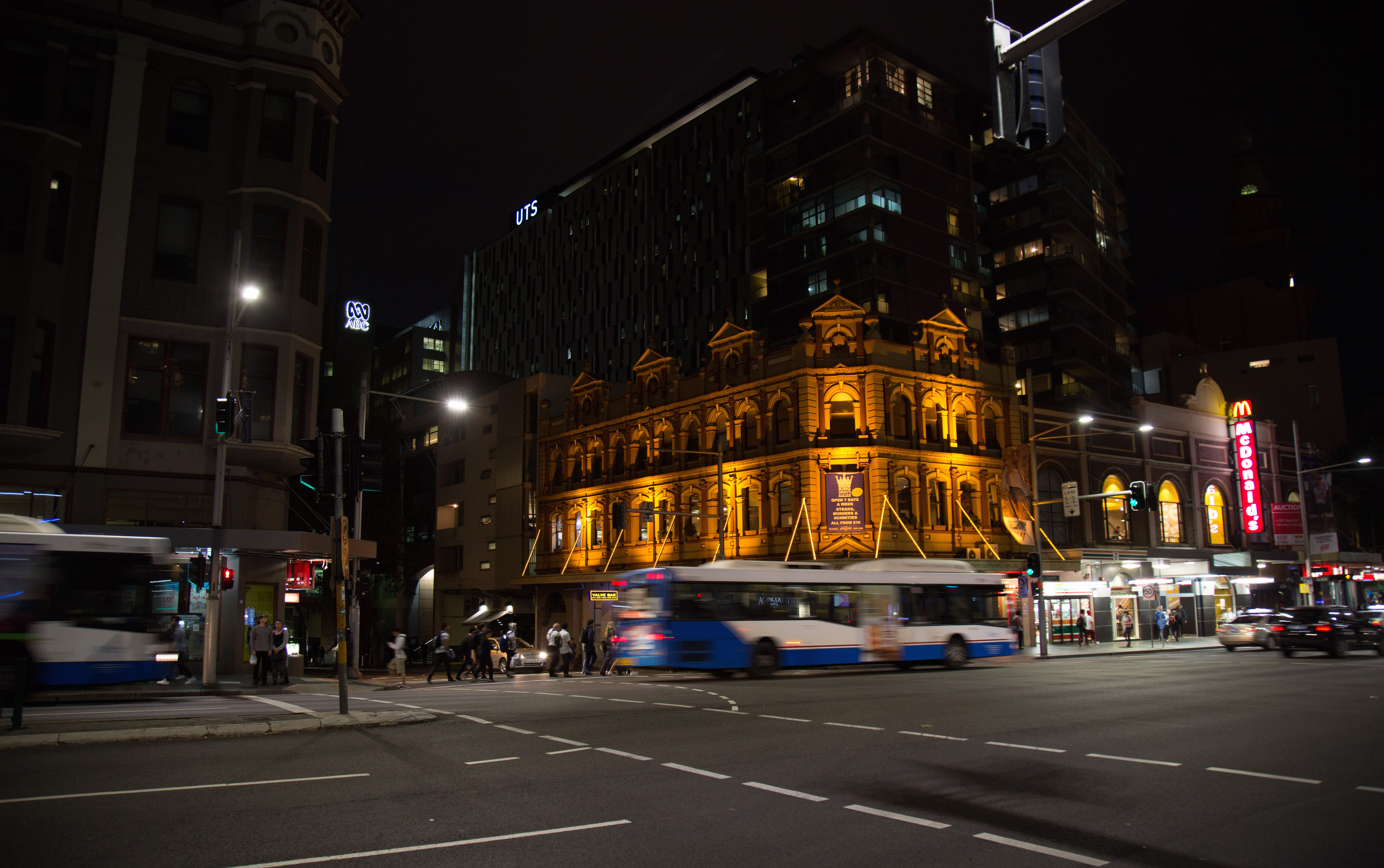
Evening buses running along George Street.

Ultimo is well-served by public transport. Central railway station is at the southern border of the suburb, on the opposite side of Broadway. The Inner West Light Rail has stations at the eastern edge of the suburb, where Ultimo borders Darling Harbour. Many buses travel along Broadway.

A distinctive landmark in Ultimo is the former railway viaduct that now carries the light rail through Wentworth Park. The viaduct was built in 1922 and consists primarily of twenty-three brick arches. It is considered "an outstanding example of engineering brickwork" and is listed on the Register of the National Estate.

The Goods Line is a park and pedestrian pathway utilising a section of the railway line not used by the light rail.

== Population ==
Historical population
Year	Pop.	±%
2001	4,054	—
2006	5,550	+36.9%
2011	7,111	+28.1%
2016	8,845	+24.4%
2021	7,410	−16.2%

At the 2021 census, there were 7,410 people living in Ultimo. Its proximity to Chinatown means that it has historically had a large Chinese population.

In 2021, the most common ancestries in Ultimo were Chinese 31.4%, English 13.5%, Australian 9.1%, Thai 7.0% and Irish 4.6%. In Ultimo, 26.7% of people were born in Australia. The most common countries of birth were China 16.8%, Thailand 7.1%, India 4.4%, Indonesia 4.0% and Colombia 2.5%. 34.5% of people only spoke English at home. Other languages spoken at home included Mandarin 17.9%, Thai 6.9%, Cantonese 6.2%, Spanish 3.7% and Indonesian 2.7%. The most common response for religion was No Religion at 49.2%. In 2021, 87.4% of occupied residences were flats and 11.7% were semi-detached, row or terrace houses, or townhouses. Just 0.2% were separate houses.

At the 2016 census, it had a population of 8,845 of which 82.4% were born overseas. In 2016, the most common ancestries in Ultimo were Chinese 36.6%, English 8.4%, Australian 5.8%, Thai 4.3% and Korean 3.3%. In Ultimo, 17.6% of people were born in Australia. The most common countries of birth were China 29.8%, Thailand 5.0%, South Korea 3.5%, Indonesia 3.1% and India 2.4%. 23.7% of people only spoke English at home. Other languages spoken at home included Mandarin 28.1%, Cantonese 7.0%, Thai 5.0%, Korean 3.2% and Indonesian 2.5%. The most common response for religion was No Religion at 49.9%. In 2016, 90.6% of residences were flats and 8.2% were semi-detached, row or terrace house, townhouse etc.

The 2001 census recorded a population of 4,054, 46% of whom were born overseas.

== Houses ==
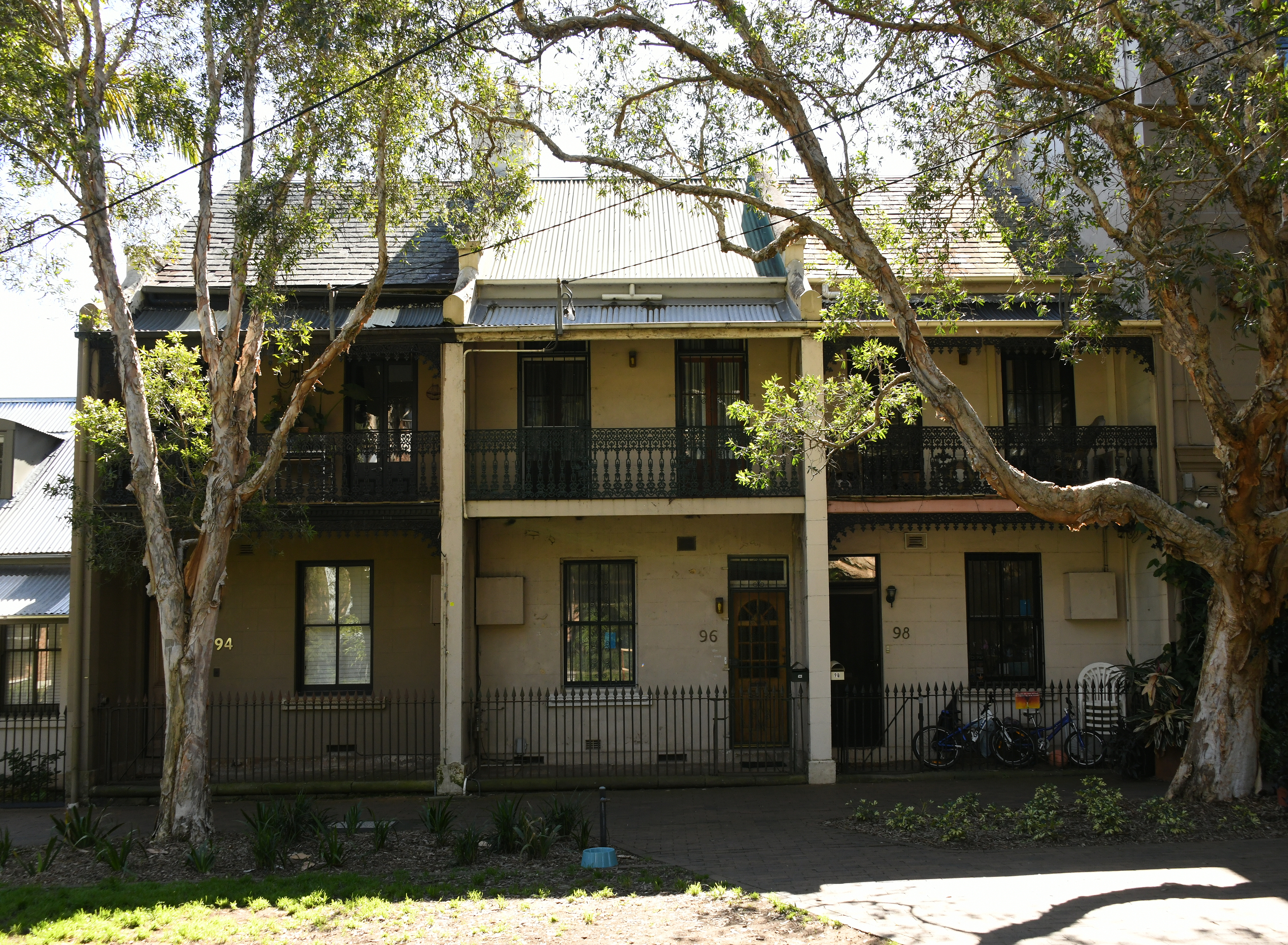
Terraced houses in Quarry Street

In common with other inner suburbs such as Surry Hills, Ultimo still has some of the oldest examples of Victorian terraces. Despite slum clearance and redevelopment during the 20th century, many fine examples exist which, as in other inner Sydney suburbs, have been progressively 'gentrified' in recent times.

== Education ==
Ultimo is home to the main campus of the University of Technology Sydney and the Sydney Institute of TAFE, the largest TAFE in New South Wales. International Grammar School is located near the western boundary. Ultimo Public School is bounded by Jones Street, Wattle Street and Quarry Street. Barnardos Early Learning Centre is accessible from the Jones Street side of the property, with its balcony overlooking Ultimo Public School to the west.

== Notable residents ==
- Lionel Bowen, politician, 6th Deputy Prime Minister of Australia
- John Harris, surgeon and magistrate
- John Alexander Stammers Jones, owned the Zig Zag brewery
- Nina Eva Vida Jones born Harris, (1882–1966) was a racing driver
- Edward Riley, pastoralist and merchant

== Gallery ==
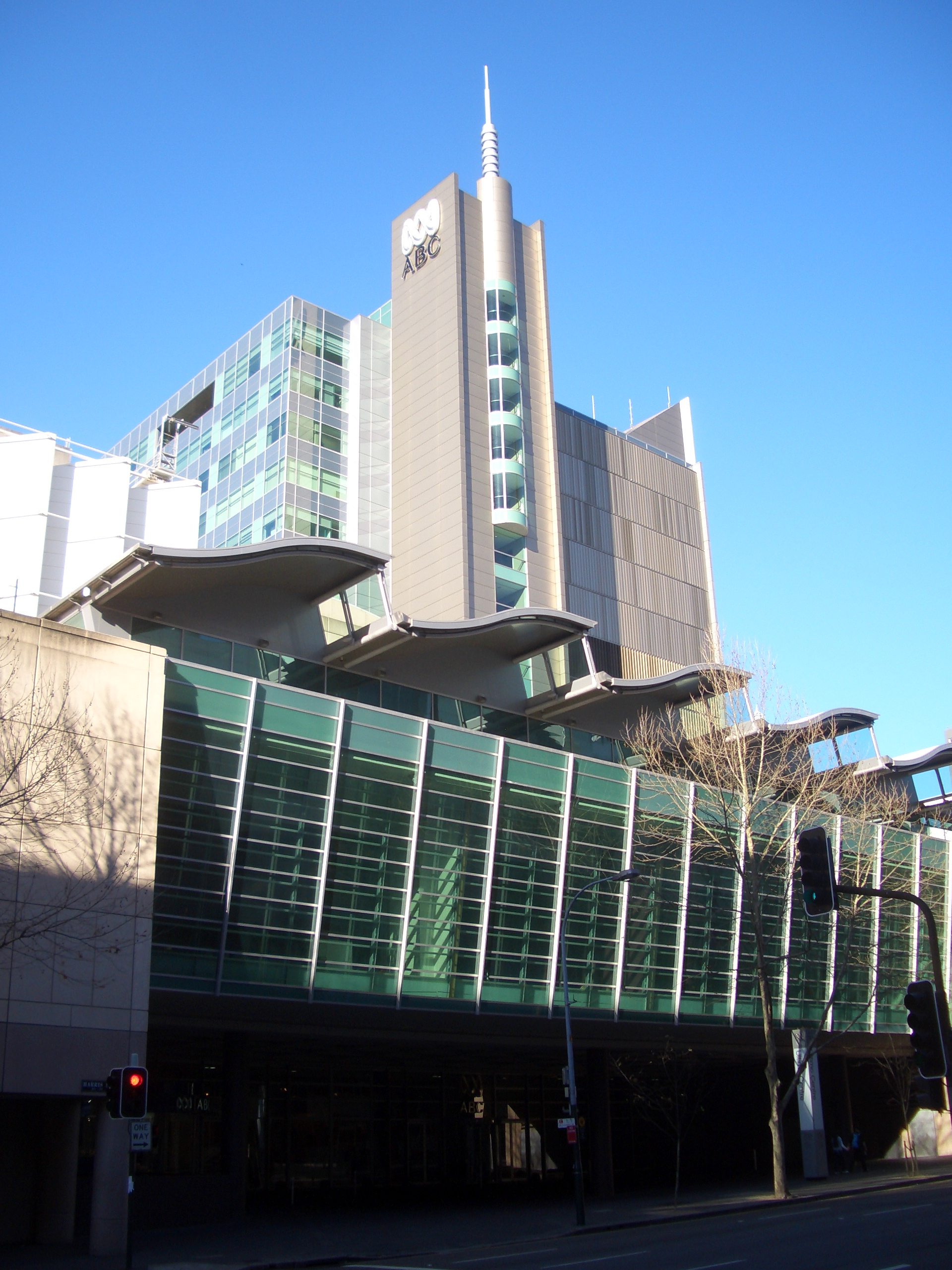
ABC building, Harris Street

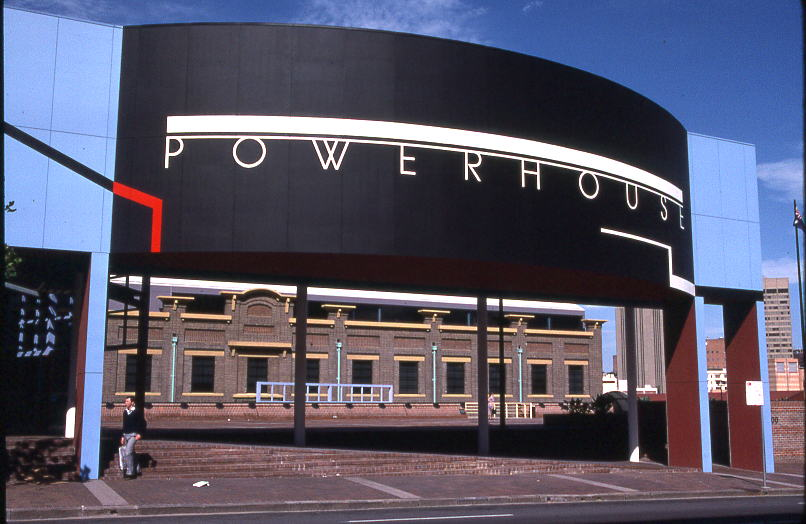
Powerhouse Museum, Harris Street

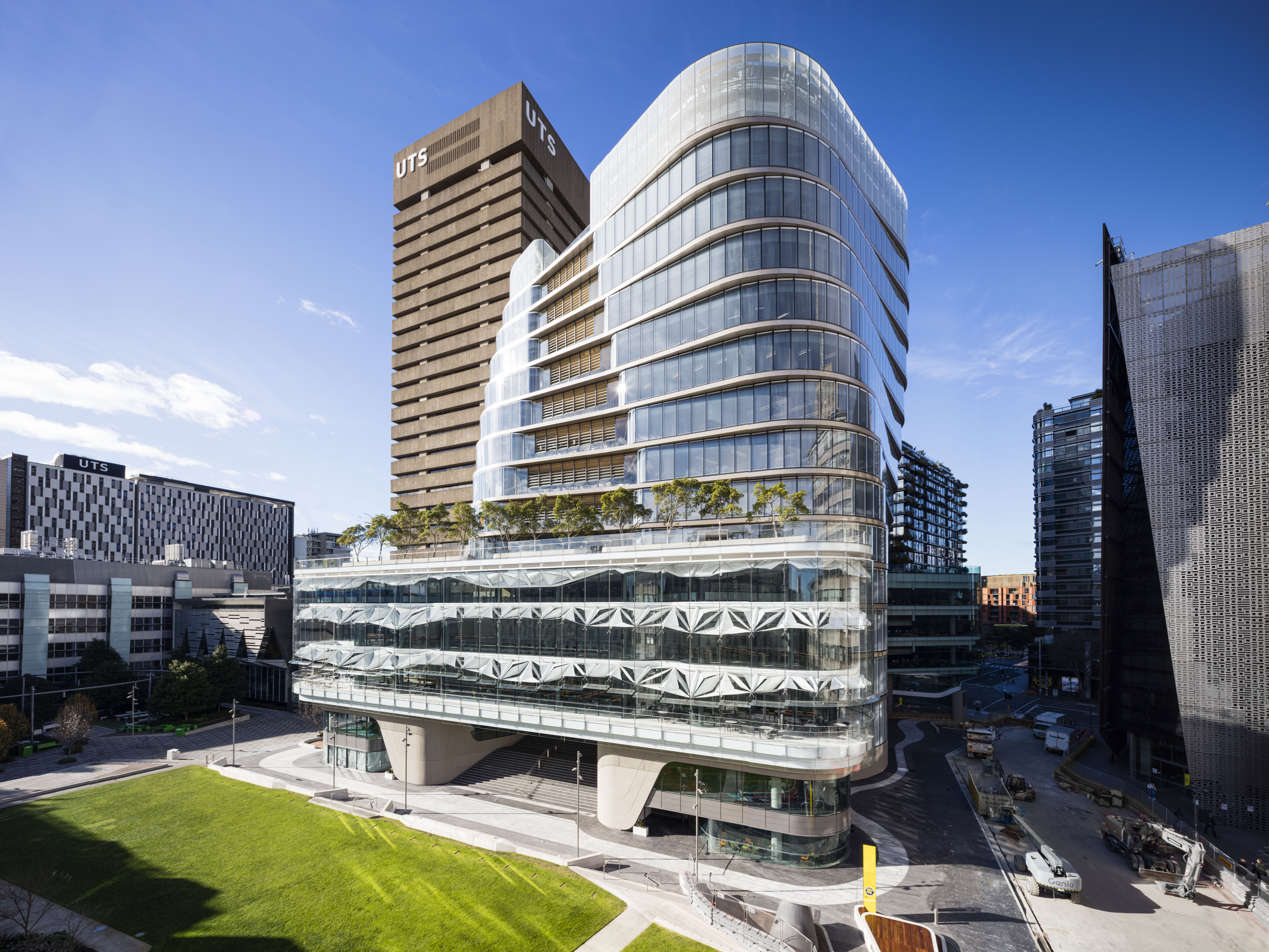
UTS tower, Broadway

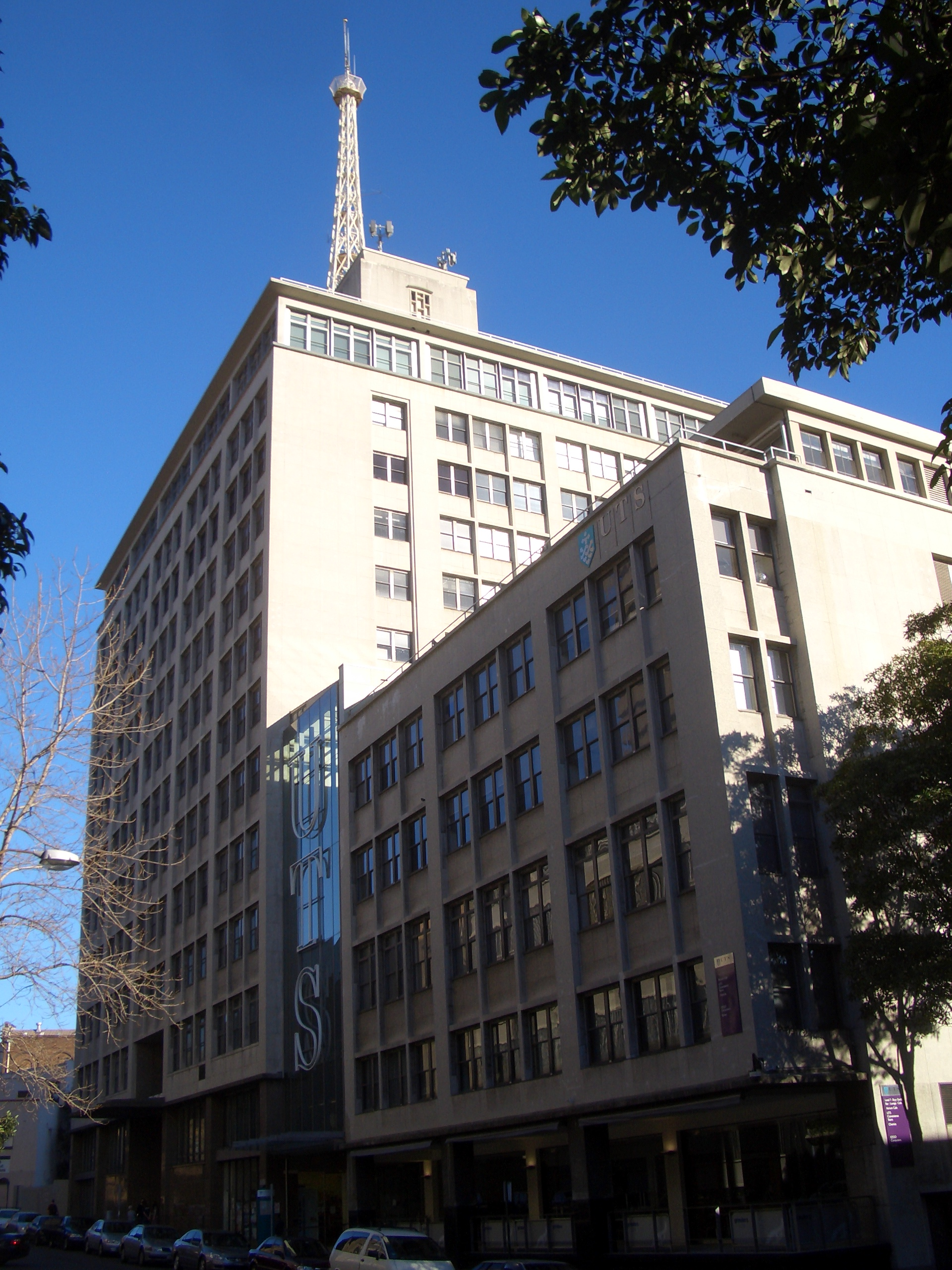
UTS Fairfax building, Jones Street

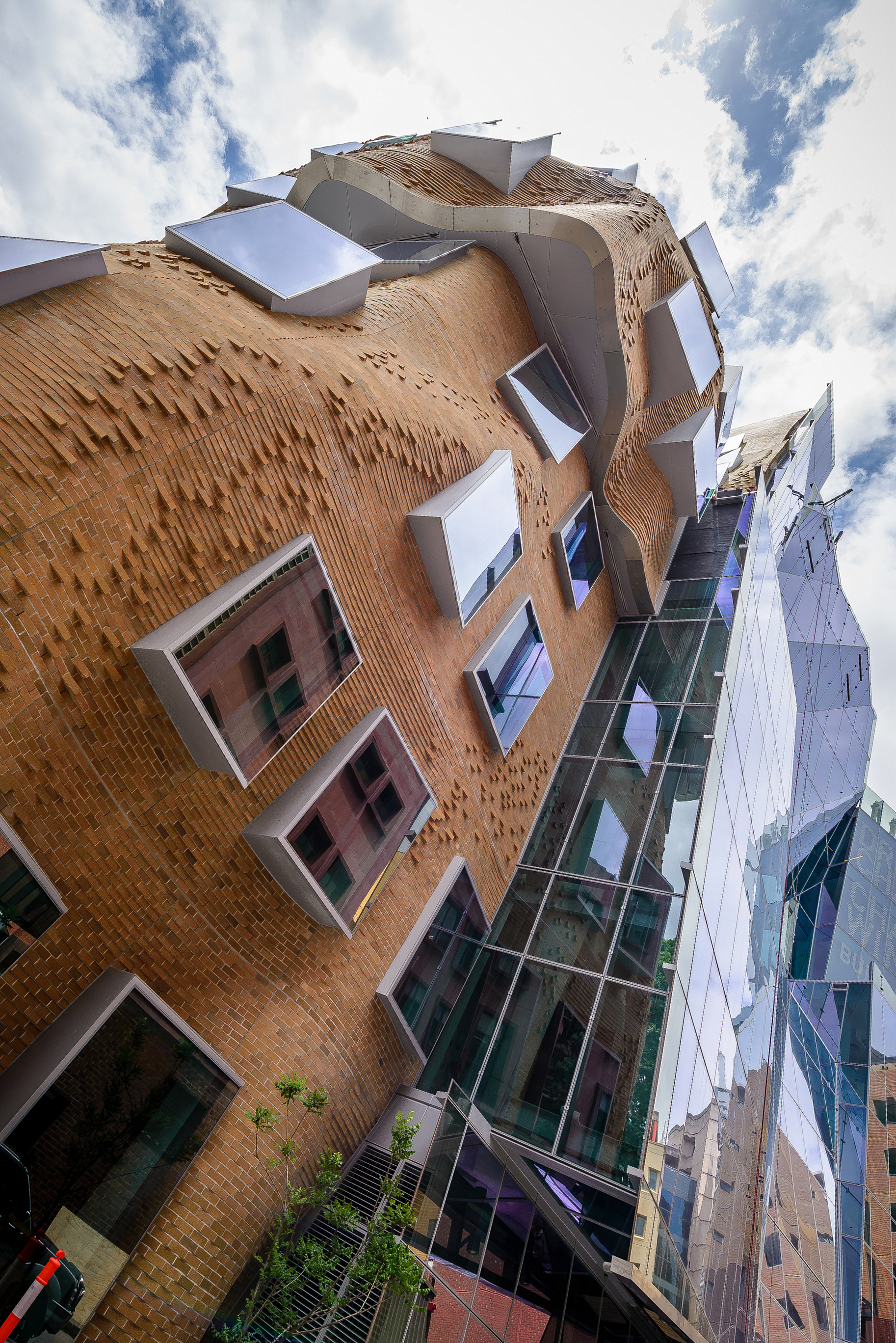
UTS, Dr Chau Chak Wing Building, Ultimo Road

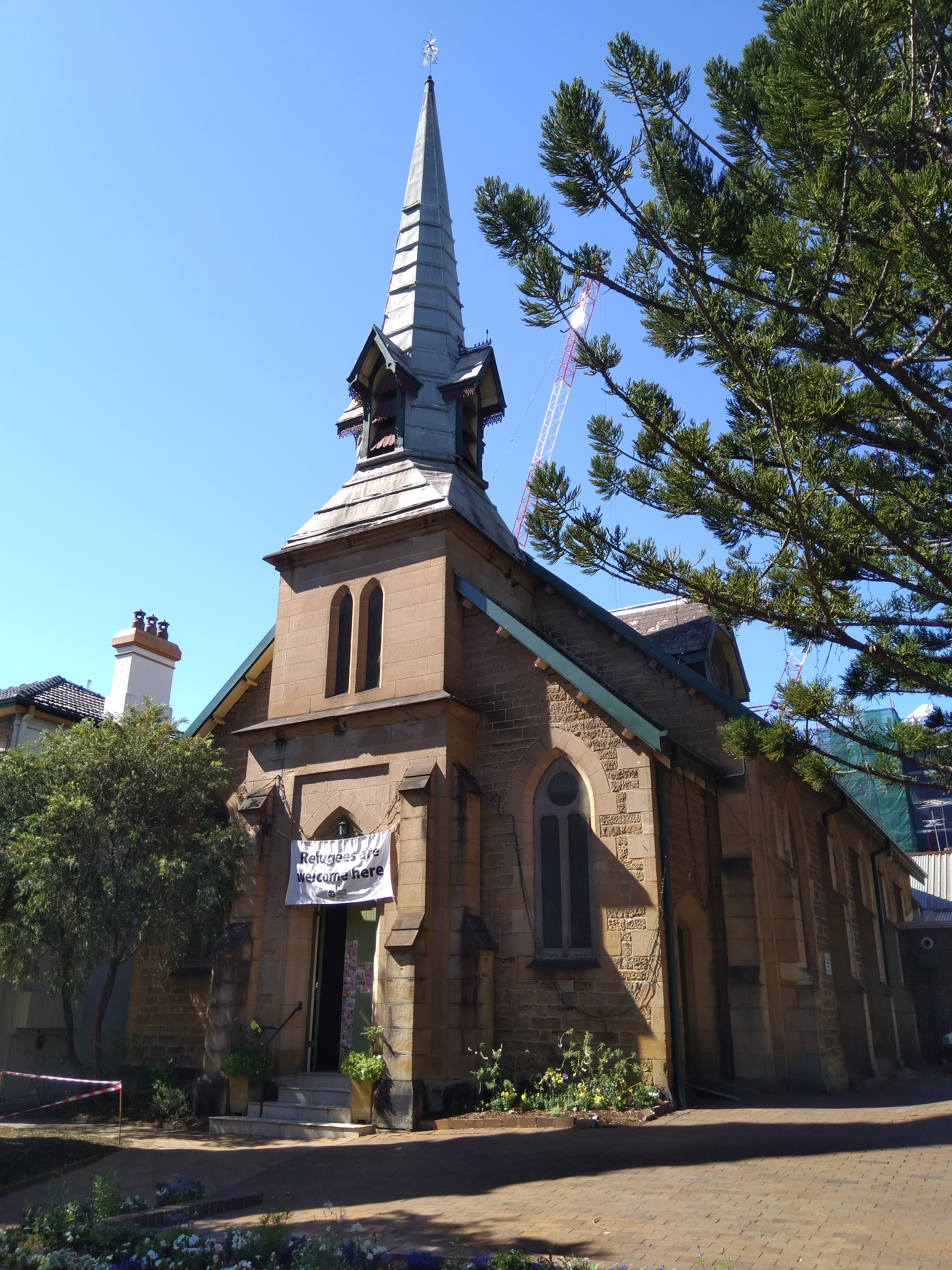
Uniting Church, Quarry Street
