= USS Chicago (CA-29) =

Northampton-class heavy cruiser

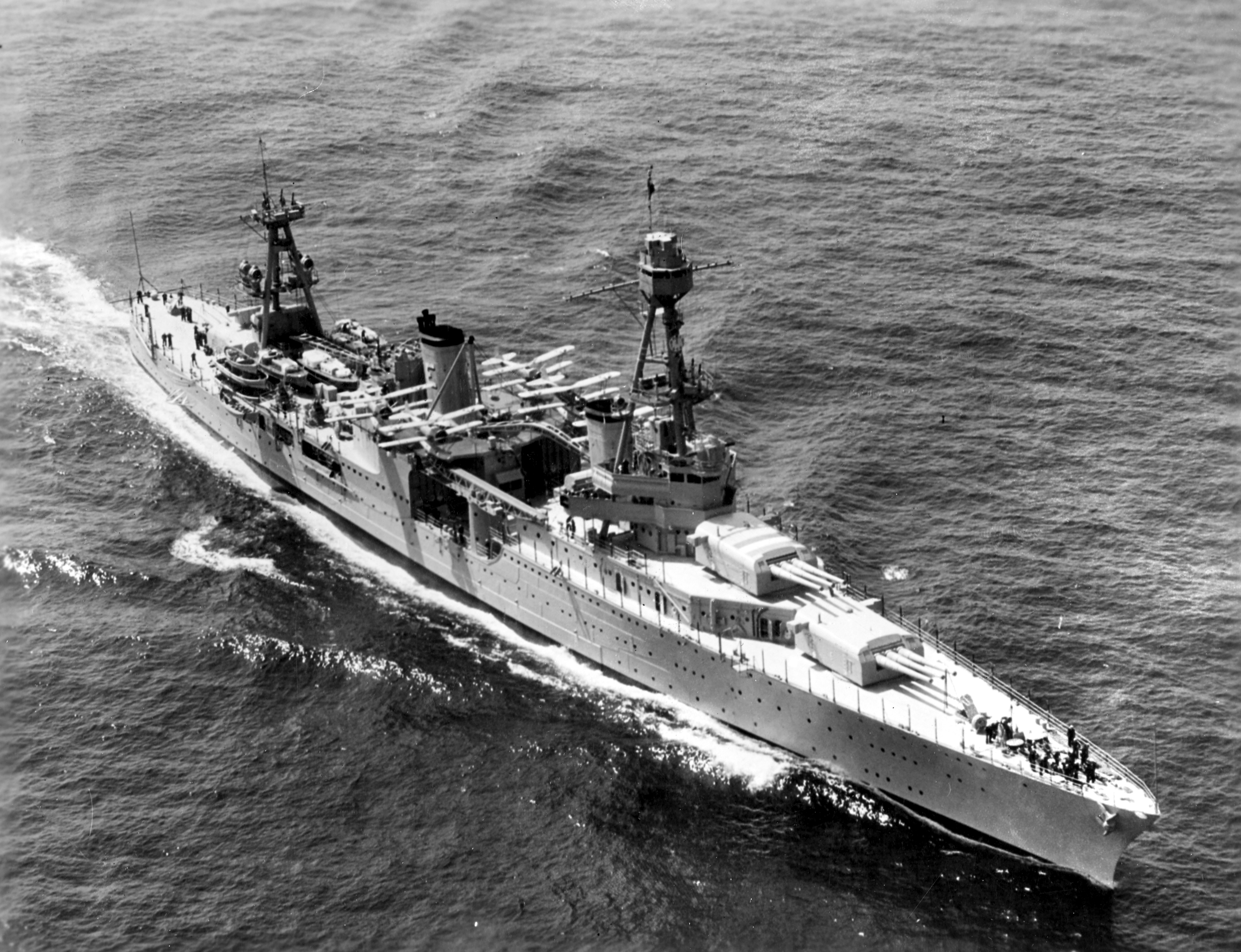
- USS Chicago (CA-29), underway off New York City, during the fleet review on 31 May 1934.

History

United States
- Name: Chicago
- Namesake: City of Chicago, Illinois
- Ordered: 18 December 1924
- Awarded: 19 April 1927; 13 June 1927 (supplementary contract)
- Builder: Mare Island Naval Shipyard, Vallejo, California
- Cost: $11,100,000 (limit of cost)
- Laid down: 10 September 1928
- Launched: 10 April 1930
- Sponsored by: Miss. E Britten
- Commissioned: 9 March 1931
- Reclassified: CA-29, 1 July 1931
- Identification: Hull symbol: CL-29; Hull symbol: CA-29
- Honors and awards: 3 × battle stars
- Fate: Disabled Battle of Savo Island. Sunk by air attack during the Battle of Rennell Island, 30 January 1943

General characteristics (as built)
- Class & type: Northampton-class cruiser
- Displacement: 9,300 long tons (9,449 t) (standard)
- Length: 600 ft 3 in (182.96 m) oa; 572 ft (174 m) pp
- Beam: 66 ft 1 in (20.14 m)
- Draft: 16 ft 8 in (5.08 m) (mean); 23 ft (7.0 m) (max)
- Installed power: 8 × White-Forster boilers; 107,000 shp (80,000 kW)
- Propulsion: 4 × Parsons reduction steam turbines, Curtis cruising gears; 4 × screws
- Speed: 32.7 kn (37.6 mph; 60.6 km/h)
- Range: 10,000 nmi (12,000 mi; 19,000 km) at 15 kn (17 mph; 28 km/h)
- Capacity: 1,500 short tons (1,400 t) fuel oil
- Complement: 90 officers 601 enlisted; 1,111 on board at time of sinking
- Sensors & processing systems: CXAM radar from 1940
- Armament: 9 × 8 in (203 mm)/55 caliber guns (3x3); 4 × 5 in (127 mm)/25 caliber anti-aircraft guns; 2 × 3-pounder 47 mm (1.9 in) saluting guns; 6 × 21 in (533 mm) torpedo tubes
- Armor: Belt: 3–3.75 in (76–95 mm); Deck: 1–2 in (25–51 mm); Barbettes: 1.5 in (38 mm); Turrets: 0.75–2.5 in (19–64 mm); Conning Tower: 1.25 in (32 mm)
- Aircraft carried: 4 × SOC Seagull scout-observation floatplanes
- Aviation facilities: 2 × Amidship catapults

General characteristics (1942)
- Armament: 9 × 8 in (203 mm)/55 caliber guns (3x3); 8 × 5 in (127 mm)/25 caliber anti-aircraft guns; 2 × 3-pounder 47 mm (1.9 in) saluting guns; 16 × 1.1 in (27.9 mm)/75 anti-aircraft guns; 28 × 20 mm (0.79 in) Oerlikon cannons

USS Chicago (CL/CA-29) was a Northampton-class cruiser of the United States Navy that served in the Pacific Theater in the early years of World War II. She was the second US Navy ship to be named after the city of Chicago. After surviving a midget submarine attack at Sydney Harbour and serving in battle at the Coral Sea and Savo Island in 1942, she was sunk by Japanese aerial torpedoes in the Battle of Rennell Island, in the Solomon Islands, on 30 January 1943.

== Construction ==
Chicago was launched on 10 April 1930 by Mare Island Naval Shipyard under the supervision of Naval constructor Charles W. Fisher Jr., sponsored by Miss E. Britten; and commissioned on 9 March 1931. She was originally classified as a light cruiser, CL-29, because of her thin armor. From 1 July 1931, Chicago was redesignated a heavy cruiser, CA-29, because of her 8-inch guns in accordance with the provisions of the London Naval Treaty of 1930.

== Service history ==
=== Inter-war period ===
After a shakedown cruise to Honolulu, Tahiti and American Samoa, Chicago departed Mare Island on 27 July 1931 and sailed to the east coast, arriving at Fort Pond Bay, New York, on 16 August. There, she became flagship of Commander, Cruisers, Scouting Force, and operated with that force until 1940.

In February 1932, Chicago conducted gunnery exercises with other ships of the Scouting Force preliminary to Fleet Problem XIII off the California coast. The fleet was based on the West Coast thereafter and, until 1934, operated in the Pacific, from Alaska to the Panama Canal Zone and the Hawaiian Islands.

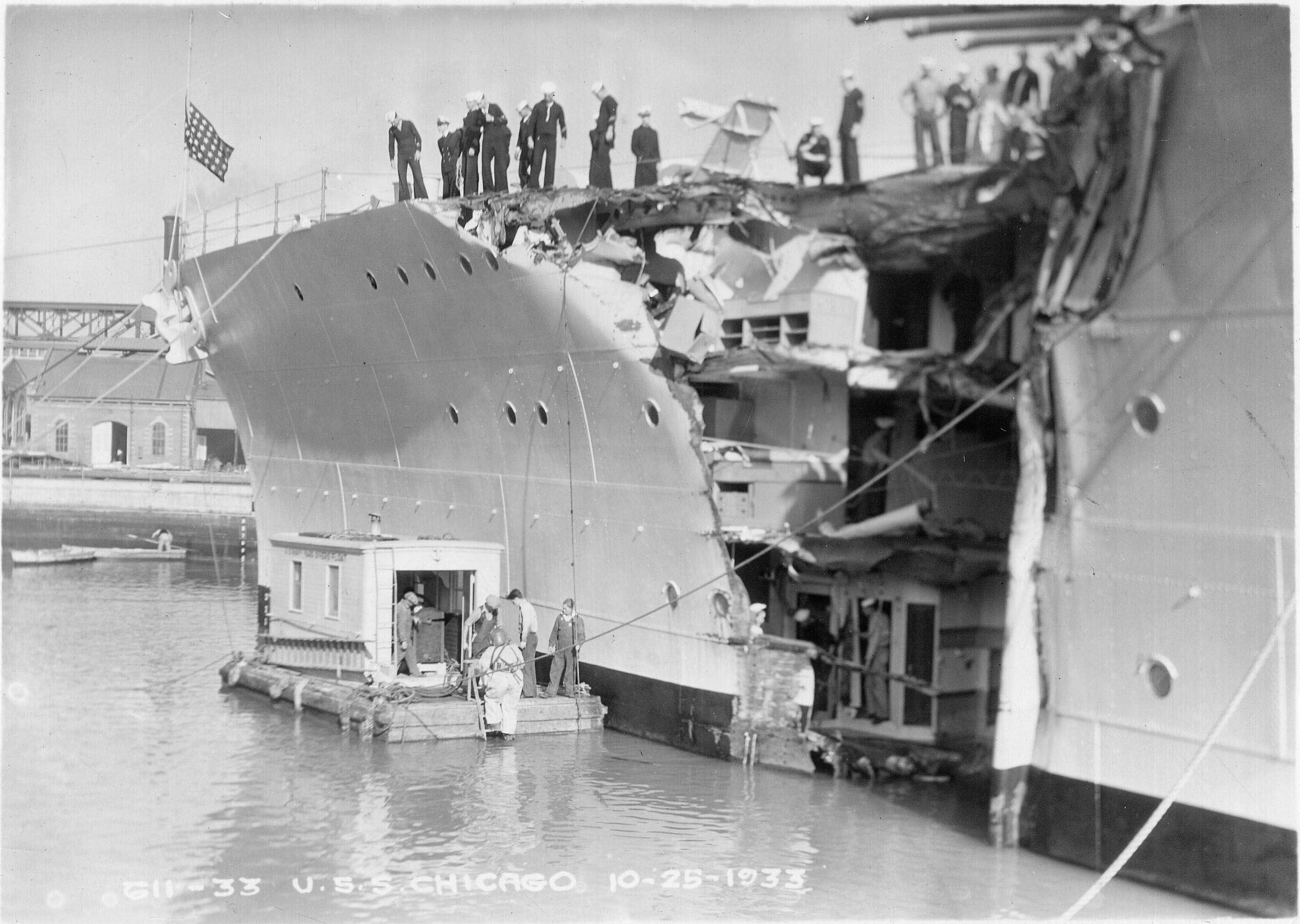
The damaged USS Chicago with Mare Island's diving barge alongside at Mare Island Navy Yard on 25 October 1933 after her collision with the British freighter Silver Palm

On 24 October 1933, Chicago collided with the British freighter Silver Palm in dense fog off Point Sur, California. Three officers aboard Chicago were killed in their quarters during the collision, and an enlisted man's arm had to be amputated as well. Silver Palm penetrated around 18 feet (5.5 m) into the cruiser's port bow, forward of the Number 1 gun mount. At the time of the incident damage was estimated to be around $200,000 ($4.97 million today). The vessel was repaired at the Mare Island Naval Shipyard, departing there on 24 March 1934.

In 1934, the annual fleet exercises were held in the Caribbean, followed in May 1934 by the Presidential Fleet Review in New York Harbor. The Scouting Force operated along the east coast and in the Caribbean until October and then returned to base at San Pedro, California. Chicago was one of six ships to receive the new RCA CXAM radar in 1940. Chicago continued to operate out of San Pedro until 29 September 1940, when she sailed to Pearl Harbor.

During the next 14 months, Chicago operated out of Pearl Harbor, exercising with various task forces to develop tactics and cruising formations, and cruising to Australia and to the west coast.

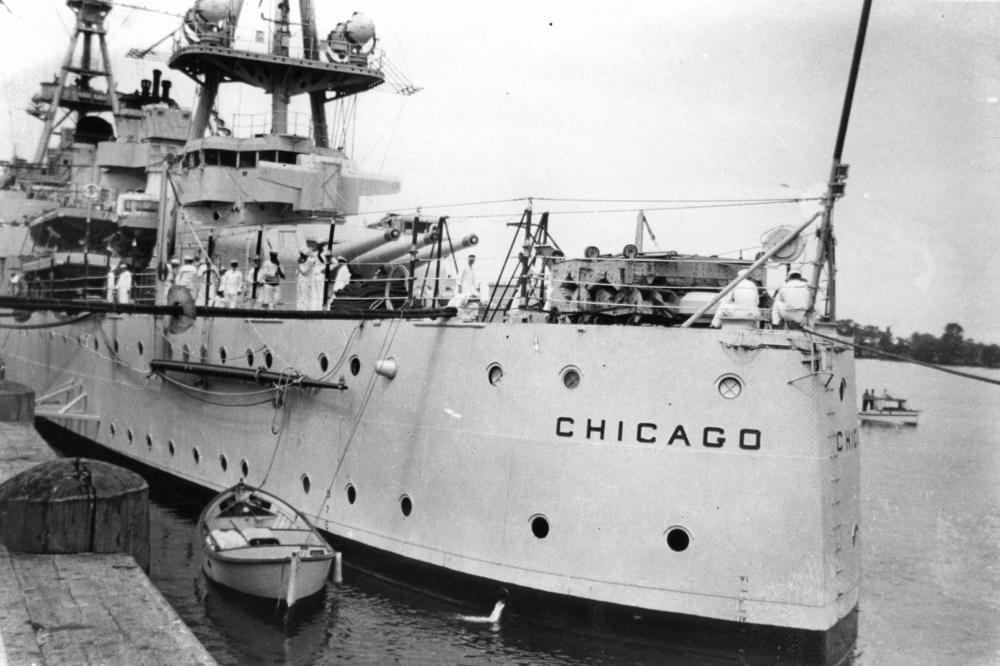
USS Chicago docked in Brisbane, March 1941

=== World War II ===
When the Japanese attacked Pearl Harbor on 7 December 1941, Chicago was at sea with Task Force 12 and the Force immediately began a five-day sweep in the Oahu-Johnston-Palmyra triangle in an effort to intercept the enemy. The Force returned to Pearl Harbor on 12 December; from 14–27 December, Chicago operated with Task Force 11 on patrol and search missions.

On 2 February 1942, Chicago departed Pearl Harbor for Suva, where she joined the newly formed ANZAC Squadron, later redesignated as Task Force 44. During March and April, the cruiser operated off the Louisiade Archipelago, covering the attacks on Lae and Salamaua, New Guinea. In a position to intercept enemy surface units which attempted to attack Port Moresby, Chicago also provided cover for the arrival of American troops on New Caledonia.

On 1 May, Chicago was ordered from Nouméa to join Commander, Southwest Pacific, and on the 4th she supported Yorktown in her strike against the Japanese on Tulagi, Solomon Islands during the Battle of the Coral Sea. On 7 May, she proceeded, with the Support Group, to intercept and attack the Japanese Port Moresby invasion group. The following day, the group underwent several Japanese air attacks, during which Chicago suffered several casualties from strafing, but drove off the planes and proceeded ahead until it was clear that the Japanese force had been turned back.

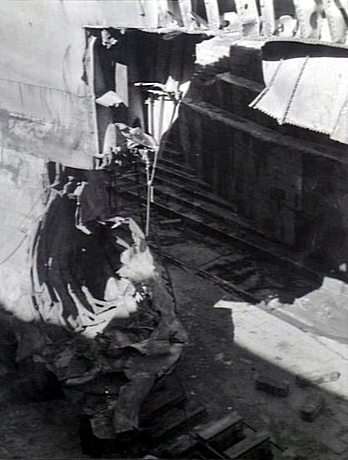
Torpedoed bow of Chicago, while drydocked in Australia

On the night of 31 May – 1 June, while in port in Sydney Harbour, Australia, Chicago fired on an attacking Japanese midget submarine. Chicago's captain, Howard D. Bode, was ashore when his ship opened fire. After coming back aboard on his ship, he initially accused all the officers of being drunk. Shortly afterwards, the presence of the submarine was confirmed. Three Japanese midget submarines had attacked Sydney Harbour. One became entangled in an anti-submarine boom net, and two were able to pass through. One was then disabled by depth charges, but the other managed to fire two torpedoes at Chicago. One torpedo passed near Chicago and destroyed the converted ferry HMAS Kuttabul, nearby, killing 21 sailors, while the second torpedo failed to detonate, and skidded ashore onto Garden Island.

During June and July 1942, Chicago continued to operate in the Southwest Pacific. From 7–9 August, she supported the initial landings on Guadalcanal and others of the Solomon Islands, beginning the second US counter-offensive after New Guinea against Japan. On 9 August, she engaged in the Battle of Savo Island. Early in the engagement a hit from a Japanese destroyer's torpedo caused significant damage to the ship's bow. Chicago fought damage while continuing to engage until contact with the enemy was lost. Capt. Bode's actions during the engagement were questioned in an inquiry headed by Admiral Arthur Japy Hepburn. Though the report was not intended to be made public, Bode learned of its findings and shot himself on 19 April 1943, dying the next day.

After Savo Island, Chicago was repaired at Nouméa, Sydney, and San Francisco, where she arrived 13 October.

=== Loss at the Battle of Rennell Island ===
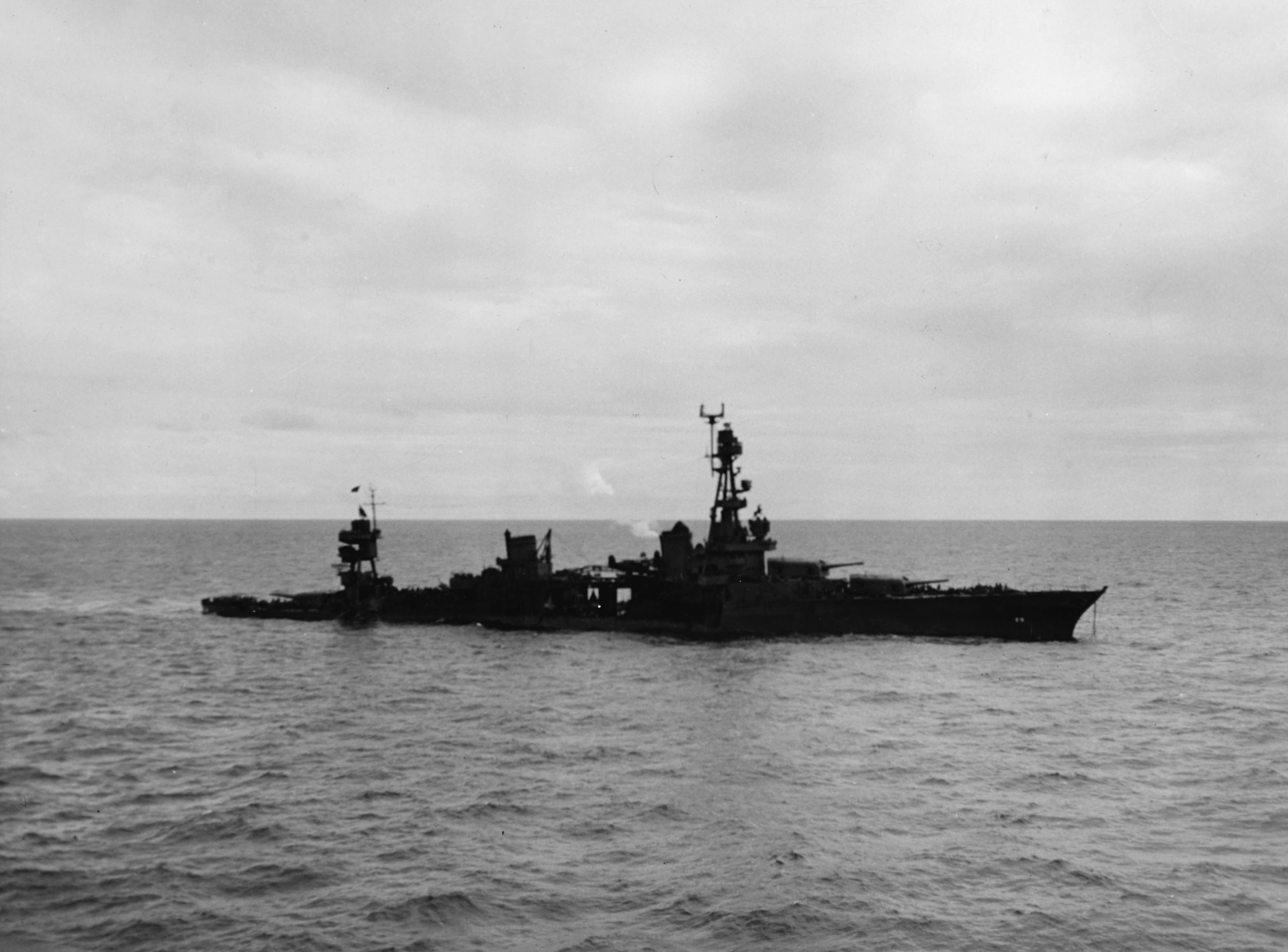
USS Chicago low in the water on the morning of 30 January 1943, from torpedo damage inflicted the night before

Early in January 1943, Chicago departed San Francisco, action-bound once more. On 27 January, she sailed from Nouméa to escort a Guadalcanal convoy. On the night of the 29th, as the ships approached that bitterly contested island, Japanese aircraft attacked the force and the Battle of Rennell Island was underway. During the attacks, two burning Japanese planes silhouetted Chicago, providing enough light for further torpedo attacks; two hits caused severe flooding and loss of power. By the time the attack ended, work by the crew had checked Chicago's list. Louisville took the disabled ship in tow, and was relieved by Navajo the following morning. Fighters from the nearby carrier Enterprise provided CAP for the wounded cruiser as she tried to make her way away from the battle area. During the afternoon, the Japanese attacked again with 20 G4M “Betty” bombers. The ship was hit by four torpedoes, one forward of the bridge and three others in her engineering spaces. The patrolling fighters downed 8 of the attacking planes, but the damage was done. Captain Ralph O. Davis gave the order to abandon ship shortly before Chicago sank stern first, 20 minutes later at 11°25′S 160°56′E. Navajo and the escorting destroyers rescued 1,049 survivors from Chicago, but 62 of her crew died. A final attack force of Japanese torpedo bombers failed to find the remaining U.S. ships.

The Japanese widely publicized the results of the engagement, claiming to have sunk two battleships and three cruisers. In reality they sank only the heavy cruiser Chicago on 30 January (two days later they also sank the destroyer USS De Haven much farther north in an air attack off Savo Island). The U.S. did not report the loss of Chicago to the public for some time, with Admiral Chester Nimitz—commander in chief of Allied Pacific forces—threatening to shoot any of his staff who leaked the loss to the press. The loss of the cruiser was published in a US newspaper on 16 February 1943.

== Awards ==
Chicago received three battle stars for World War II service.

Chicago Avenue, near Coral Sea Park in Maroubra, New South Wales, is named after USS Chicago (CA-29).

== See also ==
- List of U.S. Navy losses in World War II

== Bibliography ==
- Fahey, James C. (1941). The Ships and Aircraft of the U.S. Fleet, Two-Ocean Fleet Edition. Ships and Aircraft.
- Silverstone, Paul H (1965). US Warships of World War II. Annapolis, Maryland: Naval Institute Press. ISBN 0-87021-773-9.
- Wright, Christopher C. (September 2019). "Question 7/56: Concerning What Radar Systems Were Installed on U.S. Asiatic Fleet Ships in December 1941". Warship International. LVI (3): 192–198. ISSN 0043-0374.
