= Bou (musician) =

Algerian-British musician

Mohamed Amine Bouguenna, known professionally as Bou (/buː/), is an Algerian-British musician from Manchester. He featured on Bru-C's "Streetside" before releasing "Closer" with Slay and "Baddadan" with Chase & Status, which peaked at numbers 84, 24, and 5 on the UK Singles Chart. He also inspired the cowbell use on Piri & Tommy's "On & On".

== Life and career ==
=== Early life ===
Mohamed Amine Bouguenna was born in Algeria. When he was five, his family fled the country to escape the Algerian Civil War to France, before moving to Ashford, Kent and then to Monsall in Manchester. His father was a bridge engineer, his mother was a singer who appeared on Algerian television whose career was curtailed due to her family's Sunni Islam, and his sister was a wedding decorator. A practicing Muslim, Bouguenna was inspired to start producing after hearing jump-up on SoundCloud. After leaving school, he attempted a college course, which he failed to due to his use of FL Studio as opposed to Logic Pro or Ableton Live, and then attempted an apprenticeship at an IT company, but was fired after being caught producing beats on company time.

=== Career ===
Bouguenna played his first set in 2014, aged 17, which was streamed in collaboration with Bloc2Bloc, and released his first single, "Movements" featuring Dutta, on Clawhammer Recordz in 2015. In 2021, he featured on Bru-C's "Streetside", which charted at No. 84 on the UK Singles Chart, made No. 16 on the Official Charts Company's 2023 list "40 songs you slept on in 2022", and was certified Gold by the British Phonographic Industry on 19 May 2023. In May 2022, he and Example released "Deep" featuring Nonô; the collaboration came about after Bouguenna attended a show and told Example how much he had inspired him, went home, created the song's beat, and sent it to Example. Example then began freestyling melodies and lyrics in front of Nonô, who was supporting him at the time, and invited her to follow suit; the pair later headed into a studio to finish the song. A music video was released for the song, which was filmed on an industrial boat on the River Thames beneath Tower Bridge, and caused traffic congestion. The song later appeared on Example's album We May Grow Old But We Never Grow Up. Later that year, Tommy Villiers credited Bouguenna for inspiring him to use a cowbell on the instrumental for the Piri & Tommy song "On & On".

In 2023, having been invited to remix Robert Miles' "Children" by a friend attending at a social event at his studio, Bouguenna produced "Closer" in forty minutes using FL Studio, using vocals from Manchester vocalist Slay (Dale Smith) after he interjected with a hook, and uploaded a clip of it to SoundCloud; in a July 2023 interview with DJ Mag, he asserted that this attracted the attention of "nine or 10 major labels emailing my manager wanting to sign it", and that he signed to Island Records on the grounds of perceived affinity with drum and bass culture. The song charted at No. 24 on the UK Singles Chart in summer 2023, and was in the UK Top 40 at the same time as Switch Disco and Ella Henderson's "React", which also sampled "Children". In July 2023, Bouguenna released "Baddadan" with Chase & Status, which featured the pair's regular collaborators Flowdan, Irah, Trigga and Takura, and which premiered at a DnB Allstars 360° event earlier that month. The song took its title from a Jamaican Patois word meaning "badder than", and charted at No. 5 on the UK Singles Chart, later appearing on Chase & Status' album "2 Ruff Vol. 1".
