= Feel It (MJ Cole song) =

Single by MJ Cole featuring Piri & Tommy Villiers
- Released: 20 January 2023
- Genre: UK garage
- Length: 3:12 (original mix); 3:06 (VIP mix); 4:56 (VIP extended mix)
- Label: 892
- Songwriters: MJ Cole; Piri; Tommy Villiers
- Producers: MJ Cole; Tommy Villiers

MJ Cole singles chronology
"You Got Me" (2022)	"Feel It" (2023)	"Business As Usual" (2024)

Piri singles chronology
"Soft Spot" (2021)	"Feel It" (2023)	"Updown" (2023)

Tommy Villiers singles chronology
"Not Puzzled" (2022)	"Feel It" (2023)	"Updown" (2023)

"Feel It" is a 2023 single by MJ Cole featuring Piri & Tommy Villiers. Released on 20 January 2023 on 892 Recordings, the song was Piri & Tommy's first since splitting up and contained a guitar solo from Villiers. The song received positive reception, with many reviewers highlighting Piri's vocals for praise, and the track received airplay by BBC Radio 1 and Capital Dance.

== Background ==
In 2020, just before the second United Kingdom COVID-19 lockdown, Piri matched on Tinder with Tommy Villiers. A couple of weeks later, one of the band's photographers retweeted one of their photo shoots, prompting her to find his Instagram account and ask him out. The pair released "Soft Spot" in June 2021, which went viral on TikTok and Spotify, prompting EMI to sign the pair, re-release the track, and release a remix by MJ Cole, a garage producer who had collaborated with Wiley, AJ Tracey, Dizzee Rascal, and Stormzy.

== Recording and release ==
"Feel It" was recorded in early 2022 at MJ Cole's studio and contains a guitar solo from Villiers. It was the band's first trip to a studio, as all of their previous recordings had been conducted in their bedrooms. The track was released on 20 January 2023 on 892 Recordings, Cole's own label, and has been described as "UK garage-oriented". "Feel It" was the band's first track to be released after breaking up, having announced the end of their romantic relationship in January 2023 but having actually done so a week after the end of Froge.tour in November 2022.

== Reception ==
The song was premiered on Radio 1's Dance Party with Danny Howard and made the Capital Dance playlist. Joren Van der Plas of Dancing Bears described the track as "a perfect feel-good song to start the weekend with". Many reviewers highlighted Piri's vocals for praise; Caradoc Gayer of Indiependent.co.uk described Piri's vocals as "light-hearted" and wrote that the beat "skitters" over them, while Wonderland Magazine described her voice as "angelic" and asked "what better way" there was "to send them off than with this absolute meeting of minds". Matthew Perpetua used his Fluxblog to note that Piri's tone was "so relaxed and low-key" that it neutralised the "frantic quality" of the music "without compromising [its] velocity" and likened Cole's contribution to "someone showing up with a cool lighting rig and changing the ambiance" [sic]. On 13 February 2023, the song was used in a series nine broadcast of Love Island.

== Track listing ==
Digital single

1. "Feel It" (MJ Cole, Piri & Tommy Villiers) – 3:12

MJ's VIP Mix

1. "Feel It" (MJ's VIP Mix) – 4:56

MJ's VIP Mix (streaming version)

1. "Feel It" (MJ's VIP Mix) – 3:06
2. "Feel It" (MJ's VIP Extended Mix) – 4:56

== Personnel and credits ==
Recording locations

- MJ Cole's studio

Personnel

- Piri – vocals
- Tommy Villiers – production, guitarist
- MJ Cole – production
- Stan Kybert – mixing

== Release history ==
Release history for "Feel It"
Region	Date	Format	Version	Label	Ref.
Various	20 January 2023	Digital download; streaming	Original version	892 Recordings	
Various	6 April 2023	Digital download	MJ's VIP Mix	892 Recordings	
Various	19 May 2023	Streaming	MJ's VIP Mix	892 Recordings	
