= Coupdekat =

- Born: Katherine Reilly; Luton, England
- Origin: Leighton Buzzard, England
- Occupations: Singer; songwriter; social media personality
- Labels: SAD GIRL RECORDS, Our House Online
- Member of: Loud LDN

Katherine Reilly, known professionally as Coupdekat (/kuːpdɛkæt/), is an English musician. She is best known for cofounding Loud LDN with Maisi, but has also released four EPs and has supported Piri & Tommy on their Froge.tour.

== Life and career ==
=== Early life ===
Reilly was born in Luton and studied art and photography at A-level. She started playing the guitar when she was ten, and started writing when she was 14; her first works were about love and heartbreak. She was a member of several bands, including Electric Blue, which was previously known as Sunseed and dissolved during lockdown. She spent this period living in Leighton Buzzard, and after lockdown lifted, spent a year in Paris as an au pair, where she met several people who encouraged her to make music on her own.

=== Solo career ===
Reilly's first single was written while still in Paris, and her second single became a finalist in Prospect 100's Global Music Competition the following month; the month after that, she released "Little Tescos", a song about Tesco Express, the only place she could go in lockdown. She then moved to London for university, and released "Lost in Translation", a hyperpop song about dating a French boy, which began with vocal samples, and made reference to Google Translate, struggling with abbreviations, and Brexit. On 24 June 2022, she released Imaginary Girls, an EP consisting of six songs and two interludes including "Love Online" and "Lost in Translation", which was less than fifteen and a half minutes long, and dealt with the internet, lockdown relationships and social media.

She then moved back to her parents' house, and wrote her second EP, *For Entertainment Purposes Only, in July and August 2022, with the songs being produced after she met her producer in October and set up "Coupdekat camp", where they locked themselves in her room for a week to work on it. In February 2023, she released "Superglue", an alt-pop song about a boy who kept entering and exiting her life and which addressed codependency and red flags. The following month, she released "Babyteef", a semi-autobiographical song about growing up too fast as a result of social media. She released "It's Not You" in May, for which the vocals were recorded while trampolining on her bed. In August 2023, she played Leeds Festival as part of Climate Live. She was booked for the 2024 Great Escape Festival in Brighton, but dropped out after committing to the Bands Boycott Barclays campaign, whose participants refused to play the event while its sponsor continued to bankroll companies supplying weapons and military technologies to Israel.

Her debut album, Goodbye 2012!, is scheduled to release on August 7, 2026.

=== Loud LDN ===
In May 2022, she met fellow musician Maisi for brunch after she discovered Reilly via TikTok; there, they discussed the loneliness of being a woman in the music industry and how they were often pitted against each other. This prompted the pair to set up a group chat on WhatsApp called Ladies Making Noise in London for the women and non-binary musicians they knew at that time. Initially starting with ten musicians including Piri and Matilda Cole, the adding of other members caused the member list to grow to forty people, prompting them to set up an Instagram page, Loud LDN. Reilly used a June 2023 interview to note that the chat had 120 members and that it had moved to Discord. On 4 November 2022, she supported Piri's band Piri & Tommy at Komedia on the Brighton leg of their Froge.tour.

== Artistry ==
Reilly's stage name, Coupdekat (/kuːpdɛkæt/), was inspired by her time in France. Her early works were inspired by Blondie, Mazzy Star, and the Slits, though in a February 2022 interview with Blender magazine, she cited Lava La Rue, Beabadoobee, Claire Laffut, and Clairo. In a September 2023 interview with Strand magazine, she noted that her "original roots of inspiration" were Mazzy Star, Beabadoobee, the Smiths, Blur, the Cure, Happy Mondays, and the Stone Roses and that her second EP was inspired what she described as "computer rock", a "hybrid between indie rock music, and dance and D&B" prominent in New York, with "Stunt Girl" specifically inspired by the works of James Ivy. She also mentioned that her early works including "Superglue" and "Stunt Girl" had been composed on her guitar, which she would then record on her computer and annotate with drums, and that later works were started on her computer over a sample such as a drumbeat or a loop.

Reilly was partly inspired to create Loud LDN by the Nine8 Collective, a group composed of Lava La Rue, Mac Wetha, Bone Slim, Biig Piig, Nayana Iz, Nige and LorenzoRSV. "Superglue" was inspired by "The Reel in the Flickering Light" by Christy Moore and "Tinkerbell is Overrated" by Beabadoobee and PinkPantheress, For *For Entertainment Purposes Only and its singles, Reilly worked with artist Kelly Ficcara, who created the character that appears on their artwork, and Phoebe Dowling, who shot the videos for "Superglue" and "Babyteeth" on a VHS-C to give them a DIY feel. NME used a December 2022 article about Loud LDN to note that Reilly's "catchy pop songs laid over drum ‘n’ bass beats defy easy genre classification", while Neil March of Fresh on the Net described Reilly's delivery as having "shades of Lily Allen in a jam with Alice Phoebe Lou".

== Discography ==
=== Albums ===
- Goodbye 2012! (2026)

Track listing:

No.	Title	Length
1.	"2012"	1:18
2.	"money (featuring NATHALIA)"	2:16
3.	"i still think about the band"	2:59
4.	"violet"	2:10
5.	"kisses"	2:36
6.	"mwah"	1:42
7.	"crushing blushing rushing!!!!! (⸝⸝⸝>﹏<⸝⸝⸝)"	3:15
8.	"lip service"	2:57
9.	"heyyy (featuring Natalie Red and Ruby Bell)"	3:02
10.	"trashy"	1:41
11.	"boldfont"	2:53
12.	"this could b something I could feel"	1:00

=== Extended plays ===
- Demos (2020, as part of Sunseed)

Track listing:

No.	Title	Length
1.	"Shades of Blue"	3:06
2.	"Gen Z"	3:47
3.	"Veins"	4:18
4.	"Rendezvous"	5:52
5.	"Sentimental"	3:09

- Shades of Blue (2021, as part of Electric Blue)

Track listing:

No.	Title	Length
1.	"Shades of Blue"	3:06
2.	"Sentimental"	3:09
3.	"Veins"	4:18
4.	"Gen Z"	3:47
5.	"Shades of Blue - Live at The Foundry"	3:18

- Imaginary Girls (2022)

Track listing:

No.	Title	Length
1.	"Love Online"	2:53
2.	"colours (interlude)"	0:31
3.	"lost in translation"	2:29
4.	"my complete reinvention"	2:46
5.	"nepobaby"	2:16
6.	"CUT IT OFF!!!"	2:04
7.	"notesonmyphonecore (interlude)"	0:25
8.	"F.Y.E.O"	1:58

- *For Entertainment Purposes Only (2023)

Track listing:

No.	Title	Length
1.	"STUNT GIRL"	2:20
2.	"BABYTEEF"	1:57
3.	"Superglue"	2:06
4.	"it's not you!"	2:09
5.	"FEPO!"	2:20
6.	"we could go outside? (outro)"	0:40

- The World She Created / Inside Her Pocket* (2025)

Track listing:

No.	Title	Length
1.	"cdjs"	3:08
2.	"Xxxx"	2:06
3.	"soda pop!"	2:51
4.	"pages(rewritten)*"	3:17
5.	"pocket locket*"	3:15

- Blow Her Up and She'll Burst! (2025)

Track listing:

No.	Title	Length
1.	"HARDCORE APPLECORE!"	2:00
2.	"What's Next? / Rewind Disc Rewind!"	2:37
3.	"ACHE!"	2:50
4.	"thinking of you"	2:05
5.	"M.I.A."	2:06
6.	"BURST <3"	1:58

=== Singles ===
List of singles, showing year released and album name
Title	Year	Album
"Ur Only"	2021	Non-album single
"Love Online"	2021	Imaginary Girls
"Little Tescos"	2021	Non-album single
"Lost in Translation"	2021	Imaginary Girls
"F.Y.E.O."	2022	Imaginary Girls
"Superglue"	2023	*For Entertainment Purposes Only
"Babyteef"	2023	*For Entertainment Purposes Only
"It's Not You"	2023	*For Entertainment Purposes Only
"Babyteef pt. 2" (featuring Kkbutterfly27 Xx)	2023	Non-album single
".Mp3"	2023	Non-album single
"M.I.A."	2024	*Blow Her Up and She'll Burst!
"Cdjs"	2024	The World She Created / Inside Her Pocket*
"Soda Pop"	2024	The World She Created / Inside Her Pocket*
"Xxxx"	2025	The World She Created / Inside Her Pocket*
"Pocket Locket*”	2025	The World She Created / Inside Her Pocket*
"Xxxx Pt. 2 (featuring Yazida)	2025	Non-album single
"Always" (featuring Maïcee)	2025	Non-album single
"Babyteef pt. 2" (featuring Kkbutterfly27Xx, remastered)	2025	Non-album single
"Hardcore Applecore!"	2025	Blow Her Up and She'll Burst!
"What's Next?/Rewind Disc Rewind! "	2025	Blow Her Up and She'll Burst!
"Burst!"	2025	Blow Her Up and She'll Burst!
"When Jonny Calls"	2025	Non-album single
"I still think about the band"	2026	Goodbye 2012!
"Violet"	2026	Goodbye 2012!
"Kisses"	2026	Goodbye 2012!
"Mwah"	2026	Goodbye 2012!
"Money" (featuring NATHALIA)	2026	Goodbye 2012!
