= Froge.tour =

2022 concert tour by Piri & Tommy

- Tour by Piri & Tommy
- Associated album: Froge.mp3
- Start date: 2 November 2022
- End date: 19 November 2022
- No. of shows: 9
- Supporting acts: Maisi; Coupdekat; Channell

Piri & Tommy concert chronology
- Piri & Tommy; Froge.tour

Froge.tour (/froʊɡ/) is a nine-date tour by the English band Piri & Tommy. Released to promote their mixtape Froge.mp3, the tour began on 2 November 2022 at Belgrave Music Hall and ended on 19 November 2022 at The Warehouse Project. Sets included most of Froge.mp3, several future singles, and cover versions of Chic's "Everybody Dance" and Crystal Waters's "Gypsy Woman". Their Brighton gig was opened by Coupdekat, while their London gig was opened by Maisi and contained pole dancing and Parthenope. These three gigs were between them reviewed by Alexis Petridis and reviewers from LeftLion, Brighton & Hove News, and Gigwise, who gave what they saw a mixed reception.

== Background ==
Piri, who had learned pole dancing while studying chemistry at Lancaster University, met Tommy Villiers in 2020 just before the second United Kingdom COVID-19 lockdown. They started calling each other 'froge' (/froʊɡ/) as a nickname as Piri was in a phase of drawing frogs and toads. In June 2021, the pair released "Soft Spot", which went viral on TikTok and Spotify, prompting EMI to sign the pair, re-release the track, and release "Beachin" in January 2022 and "Words" in April 2022. They followed the last of these that month with a three-day tour which attracted stage invasions. The month after, Piri joined Loud LDN, a collective of London-based women and genderqueer musicians founded by Maisi and Coupdekat. Polydor Records later signed them and released "On & On" in July 2022.

== Contents ==
The tour was announced on 21 September 2022 alongside their debut project Froge.mp3, which was released on 21 October. Directed by Charlie Deakin Davies, sets included "Soft Spot", "Beachin", "Words", "On & On", album tracks "Slowly But Surely", "Silver Lining", "Settle", and "Say It", cover versions of Chic's "Everybody Dance" and Crystal Waters' "Gypsy Woman", and their unreleased tracks "Updown", "Nice 2 Me", and "See Saw". Their Leeds gig featured green frogs, which were later stolen, and their Bodega gig included beach balls being thrown into the crowd. Coupdekat was the support act for their Komedia gig, at which Piri & Tommy performed for 52 minutes. On-stage, Piri used a TC Helicon vocal effects processor, Tommy used two guitars, and the tour featured a live drummer.

Their Scala gig was opened by Maisi and featured pole dancing. Alex Rigotti of Gigwise, who attended that gig, noted that the band were "dressed exactly how you’d expect a Gen Z raver couple to dress", with Piri in "an orange halter top, short pink skirt, and chunky black trainers" and Tommy "in a white shirt, white cargo pants, and appropriately frog-green sunglasses". In addition, that gig featured a guest spot from Parthenope and was laid out with potted plants, a small Persian rug, and giant mushrooms, which Rigotti described as "evocative of your mate's cozy living room". The final gig of the tour took place at The Warehouse Project, and was part of a birthday party celebrating the anniversary of London-based promoter Eat Your Own Ears.

== Reception and aftermath ==
Reviews for the tour were mixed. Izzy Morris of LeftLion, who reviewed their Bodega gig, wrote that it both "contained a feeling of relaxed, playful spontaneity" and maintained "a sense of polish and cohesivity that you wouldn't expect two so early in their careers to have cracked" [sic]. Alexis Petridis of The Guardian described their Komedia gig as "appealingly wonky, homespun fun" and noted that the ravers at the front were "word-perfect and vociferous enough to occasionally drown the duo out", though felt that it occasionally felt "a little too toothsome for its own good". He also described the pair's cover of "Gypsy Woman" as "fluffy" but noted that the track lost "a distinct shard of toughness" through Piri's softer vocals. Nick Lanazasoro of Brighton and Hove News was amazed to hear the crowd singing along to "Everybody Dance" on the grounds that their mothers would have danced to it decades earlier.

Rigotti wrote that Piri's pole dancing was "pretty decent" and "a nice alternative from a typical dance choreo"; however, they found the setup "almost a bit too on the nose – aesthetically, it's everything happening on TikTok with a hint of spice to set them apart". He also wrote that the stage banter was minimal and that Tommy was occasionally superfluous to proceedings. Piri split up with him a week after their Warehouse Project gig, with the pair releasing "Updown" in February 2023, reuniting as friends in April 2023, and releasing "Nice 2 Me" the month after that.

== Tour dates ==
Froge.tour
| Date | City | Country | Venue | Support |
|---|---|---|---|---|
| 2 November 2022 | Leeds | United Kingdom | Belgrave Music Hall | Maisi |
| 3 November 2022 | Nottingham | United Kingdom | Bodega Social Club | Coupdekat |
| 4 November 2022 | Brighton | United Kingdom | Komedia | Coupdekat |
| 5 November 2022 | Bristol | United Kingdom | The Thekla | Channell |
| 8 November 2022 | London | United Kingdom | Scala | Channell, Maisi |
| 15 November 2022 | Berlin | Germany | PrivatClub | - |
| 16 November 2022 | Amsterdam | The Netherlands | Paradiso | - |
| 18 November 2022 | Paris | France | Pitchfork Festival | - |
| 19 November 2022 | Manchester | United Kingdom | The Warehouse Project | - |
