= Optimus T =

Optimus T can refer to either of the following:

- LG Optimus T, a phone
- An alias of Tommy Villiers
