= Maisi =

Maisi and the Disco
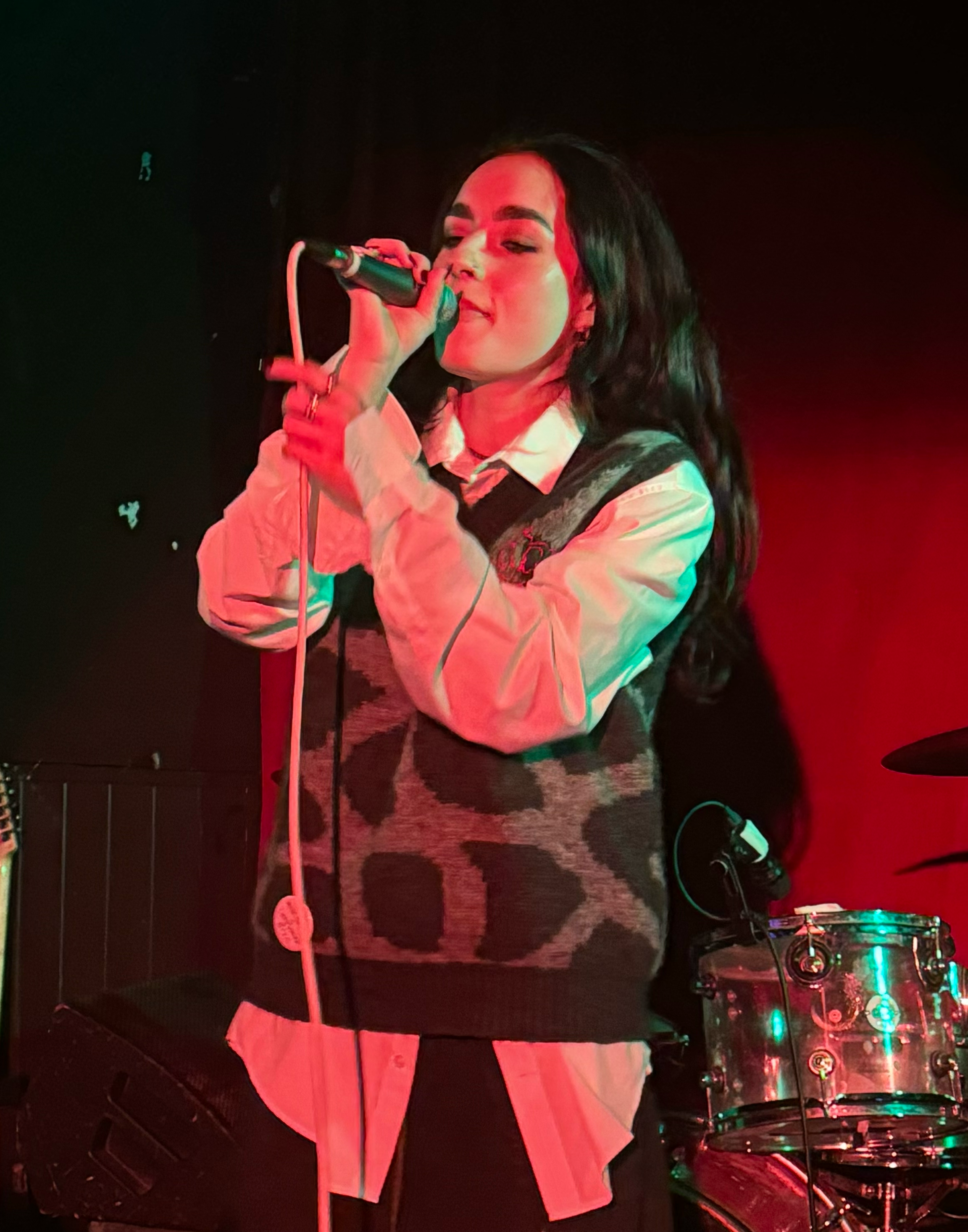
- Maisi performing in London, 2024

Background information
- Born: Maisie Harriet Brand Bourke; 24 February 2001 (age 25); Camberwell, London, England
- Genres: Electropop; drum and bass
- Occupations: Singer; songwriter; social media personality
- Member of: Loud LDN

Maisie Harriet Brand Bourke (born 24 February 2001), known professionally as Maisi and the Disco, is a British musician and social media personality from south-east London. She co-founded Loud LDN, a collective of women and non-binary musicians, and The Cxnty School Disco, a club night and DJ collective. She has also released several singles and supported Piri & Tommy on their Froge.tour.

== Life and career ==
Maisie Harriet Brand Bourke was born on 24 February 2001 (Note: For 24 February, see.; For 2001, see.) in King's College Hospital. She started writing songs when she was eleven and initially wanted to be a songwriter,. However, after attending the London branch of British and Irish Modern Music Institute, she found herself surrounded by others interested in performing and realised she also wanted to perform. In the first week of the course in 2019, she met Alfie Richer, she later started dating him.

At the start of 2022, after seeing that the musician Piri had moved from Manchester to London, Bourke contacted her as she felt she would benefit from having local friends. After discovering the musician Coupdekat via TikTok, she met her for brunch, where they discussed the loneliness of being a woman in the music industry and how they were often pitted against each other. This prompted the pair to set up a group chat on WhatsApp called Ladies Making Noise in London for the women and non-binary musicians they knew at that time. Initially starting with ten musicians including Piri and Matilda Cole, the addition of other members increased its membership to forty people, prompting them to set up an Instagram page, Loud LDN. By June 2023, the chat had grown to 120 members and had moved to Discord.

By May 2022, she had released two songs, "Guess I'm In Love" and "Yellow Line"; that month, Kent and Sussex Courier reported that they had been streamed "nearly 60,000" and "over 50,000" times respectively. "Yellow Line" was a reference to road markings and explored the regret Bourke felt after only saying a quick goodbye to Richer at a train platform on 23 March 2020, the day before the pair were prohibited from seeing each other by the territory's Health Protection (Coronavirus, Restrictions) (England) Regulations 2020.

In June 2022, she released the single "Quick Fixes", a song about cosmetic adverts she had seen online for expensive skin care, diets, health food, and facial fillers, and was her attempt at conveying their superfluity. On 8 November 2022, she supported Piri & Tommy on the Scala leg of their Froge.tour. By August 2023, she had released "123", which had seen use in over 3,000 TikTok videos. That month, she and Piri released "Head", a drum and bass song written about their feelings about success going to artists' heads, and which was promoted with a video directed, produced, and edited by Maisi. That November, she supported Piri on her "Extra Hot" tour. She released an EP, Girl!!!, in 2024; by March 2025, she had created The Cxnty School Disco, described by Truck Festival that month as a "quirky club night specialising in 2000s bangers and all things hyperpop and indie sleaze". She appeared with Brand on Romesh Ranganathan's Parents' Evening in November 2025 and released "Madonna" in October 2026, the latter as Maisi and the Disco.

== Artistry and personal life ==
Bourke has cited lyrical inspiration from Lily Allen and Baby Queen, and musical inspiration from Charli XCX, Baby Queen, Dylan, and Mimi Webb. She has named Amy Winehouse as a "massive songwriting and artistic inspiration", specifically how candid her lyrics were, and how she was as a person. She also stated that she had taken inspiration from the Lorde lyric "They'll hang us in the Louvre, down the back, but who cares-still the Louvre" from "The Louvre", and that goth culture had influenced her "a bit" when she was younger, as she had wanted to mimic Lorde after hearing her album Pure Heroine. "Yellow Line" was inspired by Baby Queen's EP Medicine, which she had discovered shortly before recording the track, as well as several Charli XCX tracks. Writing in January 2023, Mia Khan of Shift London described Bourke's works as electro-pop, although upon release, Jo Peters of WithGuitars described "Head" as pop drum and bass.

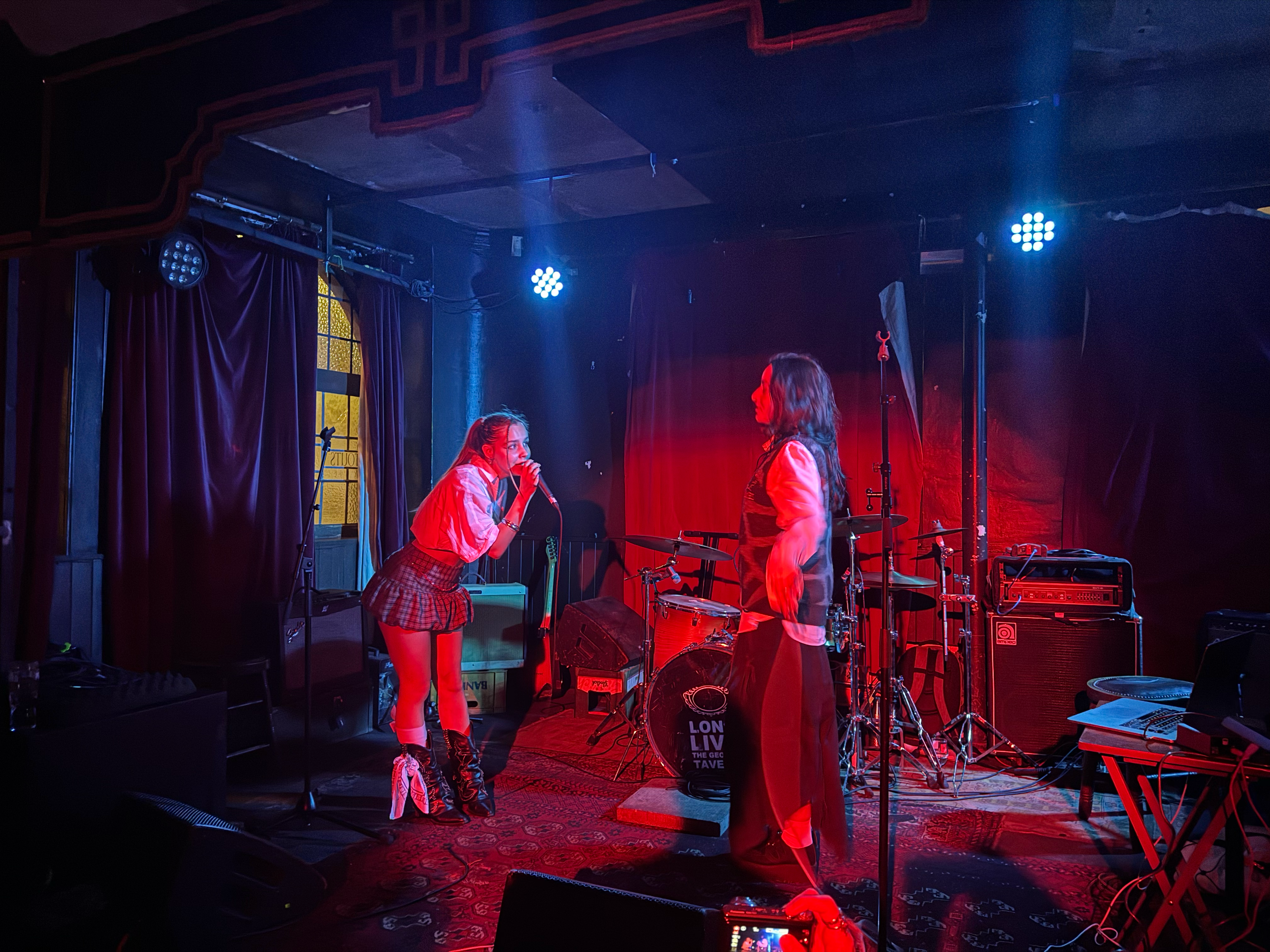
Piri & Maisi performing their song "Head" in London, 2024

Bourke maintains a TikTok account, "yoitsmaisi", on which Jo Brand and Piri sometimes feature. She went viral in January 2023 after a video from her "Teaching My BF to Eat" TikTok series, in which she attempted to diversify Richer's meals beyond chicken nuggets and chips, was viewed over 1,000,000 times; the series attracted coverage from the Daily Mail, The Sun, and the Daily Mirror. By August 2023, her restrictive eating series had been viewed over 20,000,000 times, and by April 2024, she had 160,000 followers. In 2022, she and Richer ran that year's Maldon mud race for Macmillan Cancer Support, following the deaths from cancer of her uncle and Sean Lock; Maldon Nub noted in May 2023 that they had raised "more than £2,200". The pair ran the race again in 2023; in both 2022 and 2023, the race was started by Brand, who had attempted to run the race with Lock in 2010.

== Discography ==
=== EPs ===
Title	Details
Act Your Age (Maisie Bourke)	Released: 22 March 2019; Label: Self-released; Format: Digital download, streaming
Girl!!! (Maisi)	Released: 9 August 2024; Label: Self-released; Format: Digital download, streaming
Girl!!! (But Make It...) (Maisi)	Released: 30 August 2024; Label: Self-released; Format: Digital download, streaming
U Could Be Something (Maisi)	Released: 10 October 2025; Label: Self-released; Format: Digital download, streaming

=== Singles ===
==== As lead artist ====
Title	Year	Album	Ref.
"Big Boy" (Maisie Bourke)	2018	Non-album singles	
"Don't Let Him" (Maisie Bourke)	2018	Non-album singles	
"Cheap" (Maisie Bourke)	2018	Non-album singles	
"Guess I'm In Love" (Maisi)	2021	Non-album singles	
"Yellow Line" (Maisi)	2022	Non-album singles	
"Quick Fixes" (Maisi)	2022	Non-album singles	
"123" (Maisi)	2022	Non-album singles	
"Over & Over Again" (Maisi)	2023	Non-album singles	
"Head" (Maisi, Piri)	2023	Non-album singles	
"About You Now" (Maisi)	2023	Non-album singles	
"Selfish" (Maisi)	2024	Girl!!!	
"So Shy" (Maisi)	2024	Girl!!!	
"So Shy (But Make It A Duet)" (Maisi, Essex Blonde)	2024	Girl!!! (But Make It...)	
"Not My Type (But Make It Hyperpop)" (Maisi, The Truth)	2024	Girl!!! (But Make It...)	
"Jingle Bell Rock" (Maisi)	2024	Non-album single	
"IDK" (Maisi)	2025	U Could Be Something	
"Am I In My Prime?" (Maisi)	2025	U Could Be Something	
"Shut Up!!!" (Maisi)	2025	U Could Be Something	
"Disco" (Maisi and the Disco)	2026	Non-album singles	
"Madonna" (Maisi and the Disco)	2026	Non-album singles	

==== As featured artist ====
Title	Year	Ref.
"Revenge" (Omar+ feat. Maisi)	2023	
"Go Away" (020whitton feat. Maisi)	2024	
"I Know You" (Moreofthem feat. Maisi)	2024	
"Not That Kinda Love" (Wolf Cutt feat. Maisi)	2026	

== Music videos ==
List of music videos, showing year released
Title	Year	Ref.
"Guess I'm In Love" (Maisi)	2021	
"Yellow Line" (Maisi)	2022	
"Quick Fixes" (Maisi)	2022	
"123" (Maisi)	2022	
"Over & Over Again" (Maisi)	2023	
"Head" (Maisi & Piri)	2023	
"About You Now" (Maisi)	2023	
"Selfish" (Maisi)	2024	
"So Shy" (Maisi)	2024	
"Not My Type" (Maisi)	2024	
"IDK" (Maisi)	2025	
