= Charlie Deakin Davies =

English musician (born 1995)

- Also known as: DIDI; Charlieeeee
- Born: 9 June 1995 (age 31); Walkern, England
- Years active: 2005-present
- Labels: Folkstock; Relentless

Charlie Helen Deakin Davies (born 9 June 1995) is a British musician from Walkern. They (Note: Deakin Davies is non-binary and uses they/them pronouns.) have released multiple EPs including Green under the name DIDI and Dog Bowl under the name Charlieeeee. They have also co-written the Gary Barlow song "Let's Get Drunk" and the Ellie Dixon song "Swing", the Kate Dimbleby album Songbirds and the compilation album The F Spot Femme Fatales, directed the Piri & Tommy tour Froge.tour, and supported China Crisis. They joined Loud LDN in August 2024.

== Life and career ==
=== Early life, The Folk, and Delora ===
Charlie Helen Deakin Davies was born on 9 June 1995 in Walkern, and attended Freman College. They got into music after being given an electric guitar by their father aged ten; around this time, they formed a band which played funk, indie, and grunge music, which they were in for around five years. Aged fifteen, they formed the Folk, a band composed of lead singer Lucy Holmes, ukulele player Rose Goodship, and violinist Sam Saward, for which Deakin Davies played guitar; all four spent time busking in Hertford, during which time they were spotted by Martin Lumsden of Cream Room, a recording studio in Dane End in Hertfordshire which closed in 2021. The band released a single, "When It Rains", and then an EP.

Deakin Davies, Holmes, Goodship, and Saward later attended Freman College, with Deakin Davies studying music technology at AS-level and dropping out after a year. Saward later left the Folk; the remaining members later changed their name to Delora, after discovering the word while googling at 3am and discovering a Latin word that meant "by the seashore", and released a single, "Come Alive", inspired by the sensation of being cheered up by music. They later released an EP, Superglue, and then another single, "Sober", by which time Goodship had also left.

=== Folkstock Records, DIDI, and "Let's Get Drunk" ===
Deakin Davies' first production works were made at the back of a converted shed at the end of their parents' garden, and which was built by their stepdad. They produced Kelly Oliver's debut album, "This Land", which was released in 2013 on Folkstock Records, a record label Deakin Davies' mother, Helen Meissner, had set up specifically to release the music they had recorded together; the label later released a second album by Oliver, Bedlam, in March 2016. Deakin Davies also produced the label's The F Spot Femme Fatales, a compilation album for International Women's Day 2015, which appeared on the Daily Telegraph's "Best Folk albums of 2015" list. In 2016, they produced Ships by Bethan Lee, and in 2017, they produced Songbirds by Kate Dimbleby, an a cappella album.

In March 2017, they began releasing music of their own under the name DIDI, a contraction of their surname, after writing "Sorry" and finding they wanted to record it themselves; they then released the singles "Awkward", "Back Off", "Fast and Furious", and "Fickle Friends", and then the Green EP, which contained "Go!". In October 2017, they supported China Crisis at the Horn in St Albans. In February 2019, Gary Barlow hired Deakin-Davies as a studio assistant; in a September 2021 with Moths and Giraffes, Deakin Davies asserted that the collaboration came about after meeting Fraser T. Smith at a ceremony for an award they had won, that the lockdown met that their contract had been extended from one year to two, and that it ended in February 2021. One of the songs Deakin-Davies wrote, "Let's Get Drunk", appeared on Barlow's 2020 album Music Played by Humans, which charted at No. 1 on the UK Albums Chart.

=== Trans Creative Collective and Charlieeeee ===
In January 2021, Deakin Davies came out as non-binary, and changed their name to Charlie; they then moved from East London to West London, and moved to Ten87 studios in Tottenham Hale. In March 2021, Deakin Davies attended a session at Abbey Road composed entirely of transgender, non-binary and gender diverse producers for International Transgender Day of Visibility, along with Max Blue Churchill and Jesley Faye. Moved by the response, they cofounded the Trans Creative Collective, a directory of transgender musicians. Deakin Davies then co-produced Ellie Dixon's "Swing"; in a September 2021 interview with Moths and Giraffes, they asserted that they contacted Dixon after hearing their earlier track "Sucker" on New Music Friday. In November 2022, they directed Piri & Tommy's Froge.tour. Around this time, Deakin Davies was scouted for a year-long mentorship programme led by Fred Again, as part of which they cowrote a track with him, Raye, MNEK, and Kamille. Again hosted Trans Creative Collective production workshops in 2026 as part of their Trans+ Future Sounds initiative.

"When I first came up with the name Dog Bowl in January of 2023, I had a very self-deprecating attitude that I think I'm growing out of. When I wrote this music, I didn't think I could ever compare to the artistes that I work with. I thought it was a joke that I was even trying to be a part of the scene with them. I always saw it as the dog bowl because it's the food scraps that were missed; the food scraps from all of these amazing people."

— Deakin Davies in June 2024

For 2023, Deakin Davies made a New Year's resolution to finish every song they started, regardless of opinion. One song completed in this manner was "Easy", a love song directed at a partner and friends, which came about after Piri gave them some breakbeats to mess around with. In January 2024, they signed to Relentless Records, and released "Easy" on the label; the song was credited to "Charlieeeee", and was released on 17 January. The song was released alongside a video containing a commentary on being a queer person in a heteronormative society, and was followed by "Bumped in the Head", which featured Ellie Dixon. In May 2024, Deakin Davies announced their debut EP Dogbowl, so-called due to their self-deprecating attitude at the time, and released "Xtreme Circumstances", which completed the Charlieeeee's World music video trilogy; "Easy" depicted Deakin Davies falling to Earth and finding love, while "Bumped in the Head" depicted them exploring Earth and discovering their community and "Xtreme Circumstances" depicted them discovering a love for music and performing while contemplating a return to their home planet. A further single, "Sunburn", was written about falling in love with best friends. Deakin Davies released the EP in June 2024.

== Artistry and personal life ==
Writing in February 2024, Notion described Deakin Davies' sound as a combination of "indie vibes, hyper-pop energy, and a touch of '00s nostalgia" and "somewhat reminiscent of Paramore and Piri & Tommy's lovechild", and in March 2024, DIY described "Bumped in the Head" as a fusion of "heavy D'n'B beats with synth-pop melodies"; Deakin Davies used the former piece to assert that they had been inspired to introduce drum and bass to their sound from touring with drum and bass artists. In a September 2017 interview with MusicOTFuture.com, Deakin Davies stated that their earliest influences were Ellie Goulding, Two Door Cinema Club, and Haim and that their current influences included Hole, Declan McKenna, Marika Hackman, and The Big Moon, and in June 2024, they used an NME piece to cite Paramore and Chase & Status as influences. In July 2023, Deakin Davies and Piri took part in a Trans Pride parade in London. In August 2024, they joined Loud LDN, a collective of London-based women and genderqueer musicians founded in May 2022.

== Discography ==
=== EPs ===
Title	Details
Green (DIDI)	Released: 1 November 2018; Format: Digital download, streaming
Dogbowl (Charlieeeee)	Released: 14 June 2024; Format: Digital download, streaming
Fish Food (Charlieeeee)	Released: 19 June 2026; Format: Digital download, streaming

=== Singles ===
Singles as lead artist
Title	Year	Album	Ref
"Sorry" (DIDI)	2017	Green	
"Awkward" (DIDI)	2017	Green	
"Back Off" (DIDI)	2017	Green	
"Fast & Furious" (DIDI)	2017	Green	
"Fickle Friends" (DIDI)	2018	Green	
"Easy" (Charlieeeee featuring Piri)	2024	Dogbowl	
"Bumped in the Head" (Charlieeeee featuring Ellie Dixon)	2024	Dogbowl	
"Xtreme Circumstances" (Charlieeeee)	2024	Dogbowl	
"Sunburn" (Charlieeeee)	2024	Dogbowl	
"Happy Birthday" (Charlieeeee)	2024	Non-album singles	
"Know Me" (Charlieeeee & Phoebe Hall)	2025	Non-album singles	
"Boy Joy" (Charlieeeee)	2025	Non-album singles	
