= Piri =

English singer (born 1999)

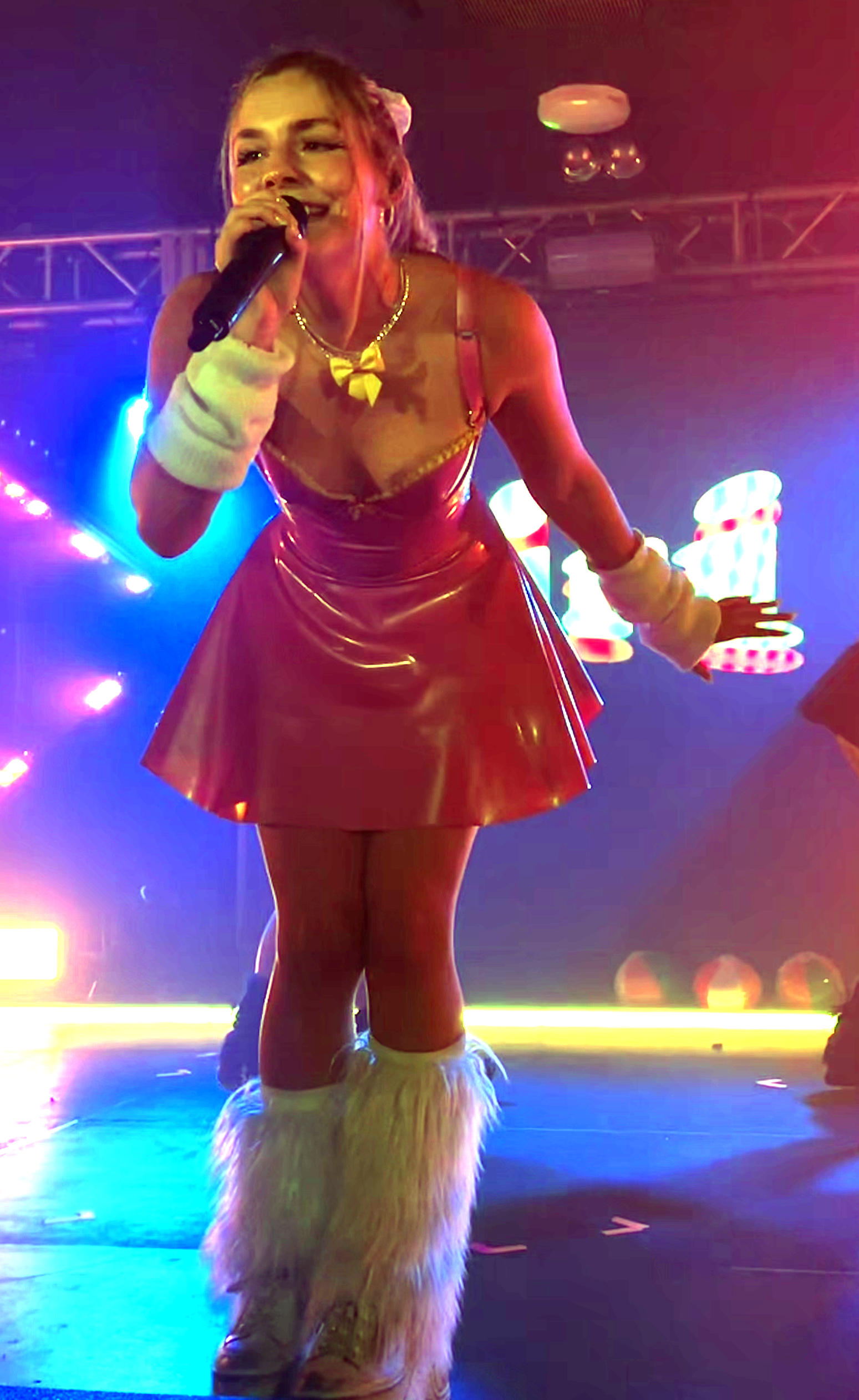
- Piri performing at EartH (Evolutionary Arts Hackney) in 2023

Background information
- Also known as: Froge; Pirickili
- Born: 14 March 1999 (age 27)
- Genre: Pop
- Occupation: Musician
- Years active: 2020–present
- Labels: EMI; Warner Chappell
- Member of: Piri & Tommy; Loud LDN

Sophie McBurnie (born 14 March 1999), known professionally as Piri, is an English musician. Raised in Rochdale, Greater Manchester, she was half of the duo Piri & Tommy, who appeared on multiple "ones to watch" lists between November 2022 and January 2023 including the BBC's Sound of 2023, and an original member of the female and genderqueer collective Loud LDN. She also co-wrote the Illit song "Magnetic" and has been named as an influence by Caity Baser.

== Life and career ==
Piri grew up in Rochdale, Greater Manchester. Her parents were an Asda manager and a human resources manager. While growing up, Piri composed songs on her guitar as a means of expression and often listened to Arctic Monkeys, Mary J. Blige, and later the Ting Tings and Owl City. Towards the end of sixth form, she became obsessed with K-pop boy bands including Exo, and then K-pop girl groups such as Blackpink, Red Velvet, and Twice. Her stage name, which she shortens from Pirickili and stylises in lowercase, was created for a Tumblr account and had been suggested to her by a random word generator.

She studied chemistry at Lancaster University and also learned Mandarin Chinese for extra credit. During her studies, she idolised the swagger of Doja Cat and Red Velvet and joined the university's pole fitness society. After graduating, Piri had intended to take a year away from education and then undertake a master's degree. In May 2020, she began uploading content to OnlyFans, a subscription-based social media platform. She used the proceeds to fund her music career and move to north London.

In 2020, just before the second United Kingdom COVID-19 lockdown, Piri started dating Tommy Villiers after matching with him on Tinder, seeing a picture of him in his band on Twitter, and asking him out on Instagram. She bonded with him over a shared love of disco and later moved into his band Porij's student house in Whalley Range in Manchester. (Note: For the fact that she moved in with Villiers, see.; For the fact that Villiers lived in Whalley Range at the time, see.) She and Villiers began writing together as Piri & Tommy and Villiers later left Porij to concentrate on Piri & Tommy. Their debut single, "It's a Match", was released in March 2021 and initially credited to Piri.

Their second single, "Soft Spot", went viral on TikTok and Spotify after Piri paid several TikTok creators to use it in their videos and asked for assistance from the online community Manchester Student Group. They then followed this with a re-release of the song on EMI and with the singles "Beachin", "Words", (Note: For "Beachin", see.; For "Words", see.) and "On & On". In October they released the mixtape Froge.mp3, which was promoted with Froge.tour and took its name from a nickname the pair had given each other on account of Piri being in a phase of drawing frogs and toads when they met.

They featured in multiple "ones to watch" lists between November 2022 and January 2023 including the BBC's Sound of 2023.; Around this time, they released a cover of Charli XCX and Kim Petras's "Unlock It". The pair announced their breakup in January 2023 but subsequently featured on MJ Cole's song "Feel It" and released their own "Updown". They then released the single "Nice 2 Me", which subsequently featured on EA Sports FC 24, followed by the singles "Lovergirl", "Bluetooth", and "Christmas Time", the November 2024 EP About Dancing and its singles "99%" and "Dog", and the November 2025 EP Magic! and its singles "Someone" and "Miss Provocative". The pair had broken up again by late January.

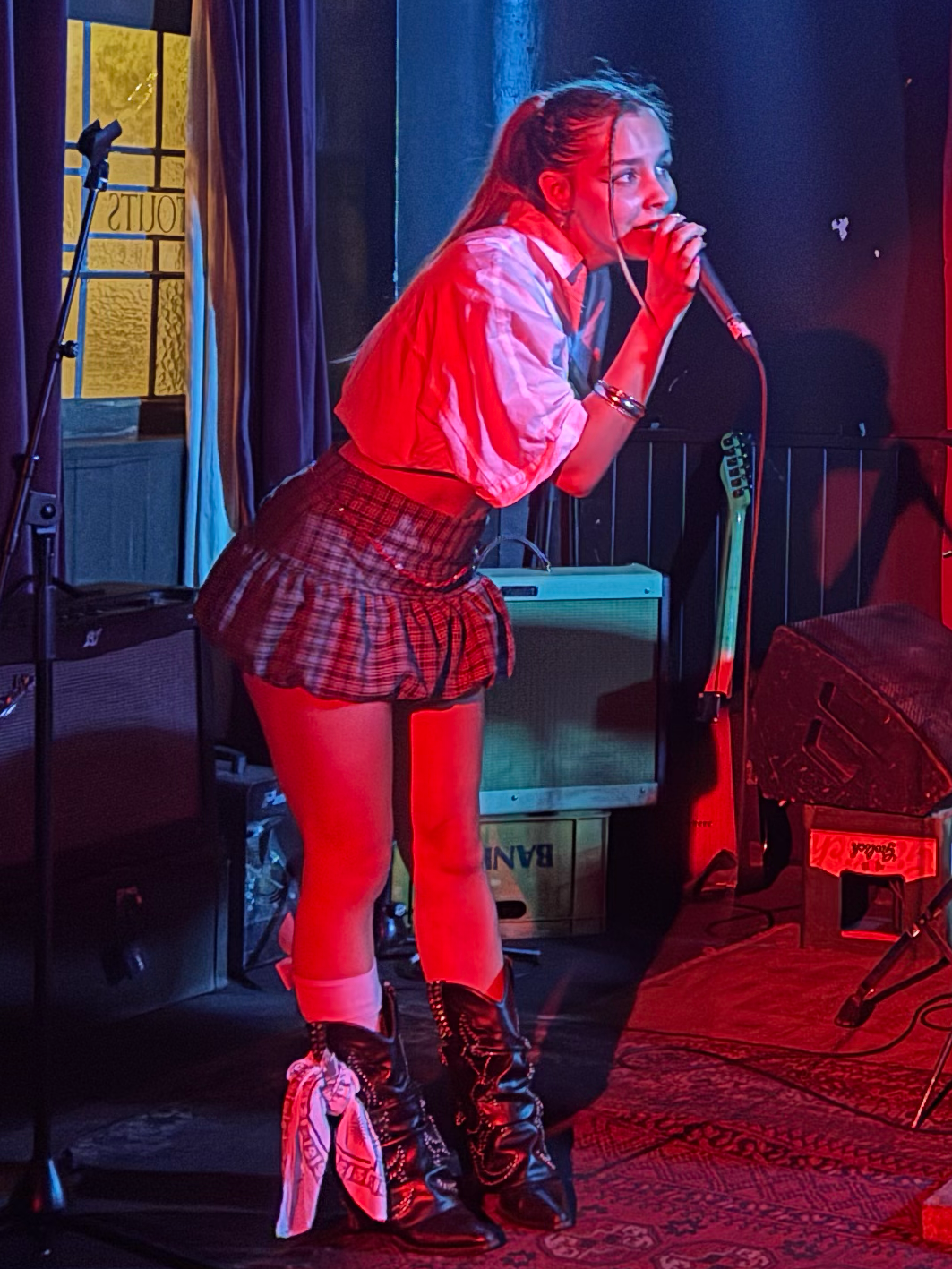
Piri performing in London, 2024

Piri joined the female and non-binary collective Loud LDN in May 2022 and signed a publishing record deal with Warner Chappell Music in September 2022. That April, she was one of three cover stars of Polyester magazine and was announced for an all-female writing camp held by SheWrites. She subsequently featured on Sudley's "Fumble", Maisi's "Head", Tomcbumpz's "C U Never", Charlieeeee's "Easy", Salute's "Luv Stuck", Young Franco's "Going On", Omar+'s "Body Language", and a remix of Ellie Dixon's "Guts". She also co-wrote Illit's "Magnetic", which appeared on their March 2024 EP Super Real Me.

Piri released her debut album Girl in Stem in July 2026. Written, produced, mixed, and mastered entirely by Piri from September 2025 to March 2026 and promoted with the singles "Cosuluvme" and "Ahh Bby" in April and June, the album depicted her experiences around the time of the breakup of Piri & Tommy and took its title from her chemistry background and her transition into a solo artist.

== Artistry and personal life ==
Piri has stated that PinkPantheress's use of drum and bass breaks was massively influential on her own sound. "On & On" was likened by Alison Craig of The Forty Five to PinkPantheress's works and AllMusic's Paul Simpson compared Froge.mp3 to PinkPantheress's 2021 mixtape To Hell with It. Piri has also cited musical inspiration from the success of Nia Archives and Charli XCX, and from the experimentalism of Sophie. She has credited Archives and Yunè Pinku for inspiring her to be a music producer. In addition, she has also named Beyoncé, Megan Thee Stallion, and Doja Cat as role models for femininity and Charli XCX, Doja Cat, and burlesque routines featuring pole dancing as inspiration for her post–Piri & Tommy performances. Additionally, when "It's a Match" came out, Anna Runa Umbrasko of Safe and Sound noted that Piri's sound had been "inspired by artists like Doja Cat and Dua Lipa". In an interview with Ticketmaster in August 2023, Caity Baser cited Piri when asked who her inspirations were.

Petridis noted that Piri sings in an "unaffected, untutored" voice, while Matthew Perpetua said in a Fluxblog review of "Beachin" that she "sings with very modern English R&B inflections – a lot of restraint and no showy runs, but with an elegant soulfulness in smaller moments". Reviewing "Luv Stuck", Margaret Farrell of Pitchfork described Piri sung with a "cherubic tone". When "Soft Spot" came out, Cat Zhang of Pitchfork compared Piri's voice to that of Ariana Grande, and when Kenya Grace entered the UK Singles Chart with "Strangers", the Official Charts Company described her voice as a combination of those of Piri, PinkPantheress, and Charli XCX.

Runa Umbrasko likened Piri's "soft songwriting and innocent, kawaii aesthetic elements" to those of "a Manchester version of Clairo". Piri told Notion in March 2022 that she usually wrote about whatever was on her mind at the time, and that many of Piri & Tommy's tracks acted as snapshots of their relationship. That July, Nieve McCarthy of Dork wrote that Piri's songwriting focused on "relevant, universal experiences" and had "a no-messing-about attitude". Cyclone Wehner of Australian music magazine Purple Sneakers wrote in October 2023 that Piri "blends airy female vocals, syncopated breakbeats and the sonic aesthetics of Timbaland's '90s avant'n'B, UKG, liquid funk and hyperpop".

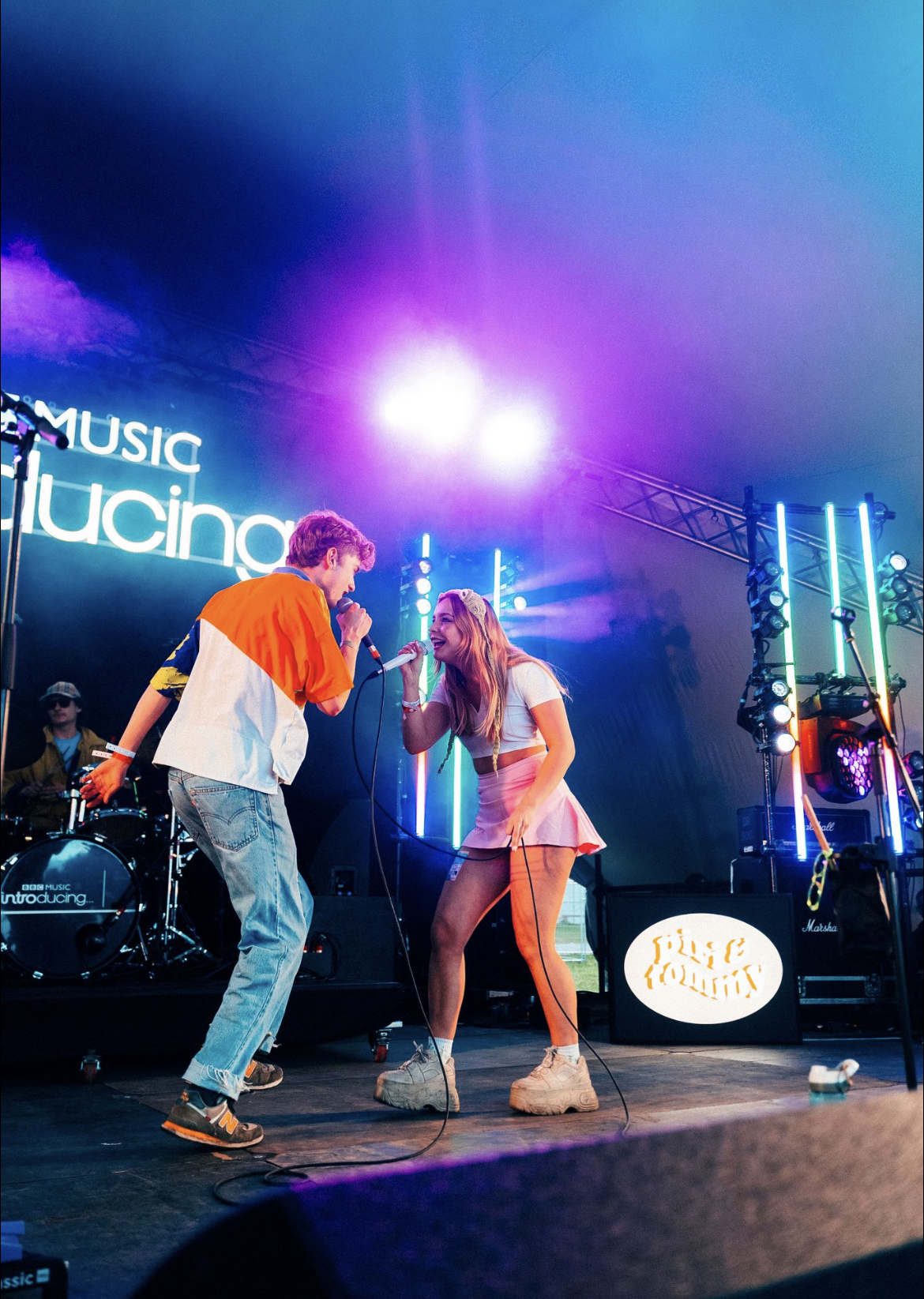
Piri performing with Tommy Villiers

According to The Times in November 2022, she had over 419,000 followers on TikTok. She uses her account to upload videos of her dancing to her songs, and of her pole dancing. Vice reported in May 2022 that was uploading an average of two videos per day. In January 2024, Safi Bugel of The Guardian noted that Piri's crew for her solo live show comprised entirely "women, non-binary and LGBTQ+ people", and that she was urging other artists to follow suit. Following a February 2025 speech by Chappell Roan at that year's Grammy Awards, she pledged $2,500 to support struggling artists.

== Awards and accolades ==
Piri has been nominated for a number of awards and accolades. "Soft Spot" was listed at No. 59 on Rolling Stone's "200 Greatest Dance Songs of All Time" in July 2022, and Piri & Tommy's works "Words", "On & On", Froge.mp3, and "Unlock It" have all appeared on year-end best-of lists.

Award	Year (Note: Indicates the year of ceremony. Each year is linked to the article about the awards held that year, wherever possible.)	Recipient(s)	Result	Ref.
MTV Push	2023	Piri & Tommy	Nominated	
Sound of ...	2023	Piri & Tommy	Nominated	
Vevo's Dscvr Artists to Watch	2023	Piri & Tommy	Nominated	

=== Lists ===
Publisher	Listicle	Year	Recipient(s)	Result	Ref.
Billboard	"50 Best Dance Songs Of 2022"	2022	"On & On"	Placed	
Dork	"Hype List 2023"	2022	Piri & Tommy	Placed	
Dummy	"The 25 Best Albums of 2022"	2022	Froge.mp3	16th	
Gigwise	"51 Best Albums of 2022"	2022	Froge.mp3	45th	
Montreux Jazz Festival	"Spotlight 20 Artists to Watch in 2023"	2022	Piri & Tommy	Placed	
NME	"The 10 Best Acts We Saw at The Great Escape 2022"	2022	Piri & Tommy	Placed	
NME	"The 10 Best New Acts We Saw at Reading & Leeds 2022"	2022	Piri & Tommy	Placed	
NME	"The NME 100: Essential Emerging Artists for 2022"	2022	Piri & Tommy	Placed	
NME	"20 Best Mixtapes and EPs of 2022"	2022	Froge.mp3	Placed	
NME	"50 Best Songs of 2022"	2022	"On & On"	31st	
Official Charts Company	"Official Charts' Artists To Watch 2023"	2022	Piri & Tommy	Placed	
Rolling Stone	"200 Greatest Dance Songs of All Time"	2022	"Soft Spot"	59th	
The Forty-Five	"Best Songs of 2022"	2022	"On & On"	45th	
Ticketmaster	"Breakthrough Artists 2023"	2022	Piri & Tommy	Placed	
TikTok	"Breakthrough Artists 2022"	2022	Piri & Tommy	Placed	
Time Out	"22 Best Songs of 2022"	2022	"On & On"	7th	
Uproxx	"2022 Music Critics Poll"	2022	"Words"	374th	
Vice	"The 50 Best Songs of 2022"	2022	"Unlock It"	14th	
Apple Music	"23 New Artists to Watch in 2023"	2023	Piri & Tommy	Placed	

== Discography ==
=== Studio albums ===
Title	Details
Girl In Stem	Released: 10 July 2026; Label: Independent; Format: Digital download, streaming

=== Mixtapes ===
Title	Details
Froge.mp3 (Piri & Tommy)	Released: 21 October 2022; Label: Polydor; Format: Digital download, streaming
Lucky Disc (Piri & Tommy)	Released: 9 April 2025; Label: Independent; Format: Digital download, streaming
Magic! (Piri & Tommy)	Released: 7 November 2025; Label: Independent; Format: Digital download, streaming

=== Extended plays ===
Title	Details
About Dancing (Piri & Tommy)	Released: 8 November 2024; Label: Independent; Format: Digital download, streaming

=== Singles ===
==== As lead artist ====
Singles as lead artist
Title	Year	Peak chart positions			Album	Ref.
Title	Year	UK	UK Dance	UK Indie Breakers	Album	Ref.
"It's a Match" (Piri)	2021	—	—	—	Non-album single	
"Soft Spot" (Piri/Piri & Tommy Villiers)	2021	—	—	20	Froge.mp3	
"Beachin" (Piri & Tommy)	2022	—	—	—	Froge.mp3	
"Words" (Piri & Tommy)	2022	—	—	—	Froge.mp3	
"On & On" (Piri & Tommy)	2022	99	28	—	Froge.mp3	
"Unlock It" (Piri & Tommy)	2022	—	—	—	Non-album singles	
"Updown" (Piri & Tommy Villiers)	2023	—	—	—	Non-album singles	
"Nice 2 Me" (Piri & Tommy Villiers)	2023	—	—	—	Non-album singles	
"Lovergirl" (Piri & Tommy)	2023	—	—	—	Non-album singles	
"Head" (Maisi & Piri)	2023	—	—	—	Non-album singles	
"Think Twice" (Higgo & Piri)	2023	—	—	—	Non-album singles	
"Bluetooth" (Piri & Tommy)	2023	—	—	—	Non-album singles	
"Christmas Time" (Piri & Tommy)	2023	—	—	—	Non-album singles	
"99%" (Piri & Tommy)	2024	—	—	—	About Dancing	
"Dog" (Piri & Tommy)	2024	—	—	—	About Dancing	
"Going On" (Young Franco, Piri & MC DT)	2024	—	—	—	It's Franky Baby	
"Body Language" (Omar+ & Piri)	2025	—	—	—	Non-album singles	
"Lemons" (Piri & Tommy ft. Scruz)	2025	—	—	—	Non-album singles	
"Fruit Machine" (Piri & Tommy)	2025	—	—	—	Non-album singles	
"Lights Off"/"Bullet" (Piri & Tommy)	2025	—	—	—	Non-album singles	
"Someone" (Piri & Tommy)	2025	—	—	—	Non-album singles	
"Miss Provocative" (Piri & Tommy)	2025	—	—	—	Non-album singles	
"Cosuluvme" (Piri)	2026	—	—	—	Girl in Stem	
"Sex Dreams Do Cum Tru" (Piri)	2026	—	—	—	Girl in Stem	
"Ahh Bby" (Piri)	2026	—	—	—	Girl in Stem	
"Dwn Widdit" (Jaguar & Piri)	2026	—	—	—	Non-album singles	
"Food 4 Thought" (Higgo, piri, Alex Bone)	2026	—	—	—	Non-album singles	

==== As featured artist ====
Singles as featured artist
Title	Year	Album	Ref.
"Feel It" (MJ Cole featuring Piri & Tommy Villiers)	2023	Non-album singles	
"Fumble" (Sudley featuring Piri)	2023	Non-album singles	
"Crocodile Tears" (Skylar x AC13 featuring Piri)	2023	Non-album singles	
"C U Never" (Tomcbumpz featuring Piri)	2023	Don't Look Down	
"Shovel" (Creetah featuring Piri)	2023	Non-album single	
"Easy" (Charlieeeee featuring Piri)	2024	Dogbowl	
"Luv Stuck" (Salute featuring Piri)	2024	True Magic	
"Asphalt Rodeo" (Elio featuring Piri)	2024	Non-album singles	
"Guts" (Ellie Dixon featuring Piri)	2025	Non-album singles	
"Pieces" (Tomcbumpz featuring Piri & Tommy)	2025	Non-album singles	
"Heavy Handed" (Denham Audio featuring Piri & Tommy Villiers)	2025	Non-album singles	
"Love Bug" (Will Sass featuring Piri & Tommy Villiers)	2025	Non-album singles	
"Seasons" (Scruz featuring Piri)	2026	Me!	
"Mash Potato" (Loveday featuring Piri)	2026	Non-album single	

=== Writing and remix credits ===
Song	Year	Artist	Co-writers	Album	Ref.
"Morning Blues"	2023	Emzo	Emilion Buckz, Tommy Villiers	Non-album single	
"Magnetic"	2024	Illit	Bang Si-hyuk, Marcus Andersson, Martin Edwards, James Chao, Oh Hyun Seon, Salem Ilese, Kim Na-Yeon, Lauren Aquilina, Kim Subin, Kwon Do-Hyung, Lee Hee-Joo, Park Sung-Jin, Wu Hyun-Park, Yi Yi Jin	Super Real Me	
"Come to My House" (Piri & Tommy remix)	2024	Lucy Tun	Lucy Tun, Tommy Villiers, Jackson Homer	Non-album single	
"Hush My Heart"	2024	Qrion, Josie Man	Joseph Ashworth, Momiji Tsukada	We Are Always Under the Same Sky	
"Wayside"	2025	Qrion, Josie Man	Joseph Ashworth, Momiji Tsukada	We Are Always Under the Same Sky	

== Music videos ==
List of music videos, showing year released
Title	Year	Ref.
"Soft Spot" (Piri)	2021	
"Words" (Piri & Tommy)	2022	
"On & On" (Piri & Tommy)	2022	
"Updown" (Piri & Tommy Villiers)	2023	
"Nice 2 Me" (Piri & Tommy Villiers)	2023	
"Lovergirl" (Piri & Tommy)	2023	
"Head" (Maisi & Piri)	2023	
"Easy" (Charlieeeee featuring Piri)	2024	
"Luv Stuck" (Salute featuring Piri)	2024	
"99%" (Piri & Tommy)	2024	
"Dog" (Piri & Tommy)	2024	
"Someone" (Piri & Tommy)	2025	
"Miss Provocative" (Piri & Tommy)	2025	
"Cosuluvme" (Piri)	2026	
"Ahh Bby" (Piri)	2026	
"Both Be Happier" (Piri)	2026	

== Tours ==
=== Headlining ===
- Piri & Tommy (Piri & Tommy) (2022)
- Froge.tour (Piri & Tommy) (2022)
- Piri Pop Up Tour (Piri) (2023)
- Extra Hot (Piri) (2023)

=== Supporting ===
- Charli XCX – Music Venue Trust & The National Lottery's Revive Tour (2022; one show)
- Bbno$ – Bbnoeuro Tour (2023; two shows) (Note: For the fact that Piri played the shows, see.; For the fact that they were part of Bbno$'s Bbnoeuro Tour, see.)
