= Nice 2 Me =

Single by Piri & Tommy Villiers
- Released: 24 May 2023
- Genre: Drum and bass
- Length: 2:51 (original version); 3:26 (Tommy Villiers Remix); 2:30 (acoustic)
- Label: Polydor
- Songwriters: Piri; Tommy Villiers
- Producers: Tommy Villiers; Piri

Piri & Tommy Villiers singles chronology
"Updown" (2023)	"Nice 2 Me" (2023)	"Lovergirl" (2023)

Music video
- "Updown" (official video) on YouTube

"Nice 2 Me", sometimes referred to as "Nice to Me", is a single by Piri and Tommy Villiers. Released 24 May 2023 on Polydor Records, "Nice 2 Me" followed 2022's track "On & On" and EP Froge.mp3 and 2023's single "Updown". The song speaks of wanting to be treated nicely in a relationship and had previously been performed during Froge.tour. "Nice 2 Me" samples the Amen break and was an attempt at mimicking DJ Marky. BBC Radio 1 announced it as that day's "Hottest Record" and Spotify later added it to its "Planet Rave" playlist.

Notion complimented the song's "acoustic-infused liquid DnB beat", while Dan Cairns of The Times wrote that the track was "at once as light as air and as insistent as a final demand". Hollie Geraghty of The Forty Five described the song as "a weightless summer melody that radiates warmth and golden hour sunshine", while DIY described the song as "sure to be a massive singalong anthem this summer". A more critical review, however, came from Stephanie van Tol of Dancing Bears, who opined that little happened on the record and that it felt "much longer" than its sub-three minute playing time. In September 2023, the song appeared on the soundtrack for EA Sports FC 24.

== Track listing ==
Digital single

1. "Nice 2 Me" (Piri & Tommy) – 2:51

Tommy Villiers Remix

1. "Nice 2 Me" (Tommy Villiers Remix) – 3:26

Acoustic

1. "Nice 2 Me" (Acoustic) – 2:30

== Personnel ==
- Piri – vocals
- Tommy Villiers – production, mixing
- Kevin Grainger – mastering

== Release history ==
Release history for "Nice 2 Me"
Region	Date	Version	Format	Label	Ref.
Various	24 May 2023	Original version	Digital download; streaming	Polydor	
Various	23 June 2023	Tommy Villiers Remix	Digital download; streaming	Polydor	
Various	7 July 2023	Acoustic	Digital download; streaming	Polydor	
