= On & On (Piri & Tommy song) =

Single by Piri & Tommy

from the album Froge.mp3
- Released: 28 July 2022
- Genre: Liquid drum and bass
- Length: 2:15 (single version); 3:36 (extended mix); 2:11 (Sammy Virji remix); 4:32 (Sudley remix); 1:00 (instrumental)
- Label: Polydor
- Songwriters: Piri; Tommy Villiers
- Producer: Tommy Villiers

Piri & Tommy singles chronology
"Words" (2022)	"On & On" (2022)	"Unlock It" (2022)

Music video
- "On & On" music video on YouTube "On & On" lyric video on YouTube "On & On" acoustic music video on YouTube

"On & On" (stylised in lowercase) is a liquid drum and bass song by Piri & Tommy, from their mixtape Froge.mp3. Released on 28 July 2022 on Polydor Records, the track was written after the pair attended that year's Parklife Festival. The song premiered as BBC Radio 1's "Hottest Record"song charted at No. 99 on the UK Singles Chart and received positive reception, with Time Out, The Forty Five, NME, Dancing Bears, and Billboard rating it on their year-end best of lists. A music video was released on 12 October 2022 to promote Froge.mp3.

== Background and composition ==
In 2020, just before the second United Kingdom COVID-19 lockdown, Piri matched on Tinder with Tommy Villiers, a member of the band Porij. A couple of weeks later, one of the band's photographers retweeted one of their photo shoots, prompting her to find his Instagram account and ask him out. The pair released "Soft Spot" in June 2021, which went viral on TikTok and Spotify, prompting EMI to sign the pair, re-release that track, and release their tracks "Beachin" and "Words".

In September 2021, Piri and Tommy attended that year's Parklife Festival, following which Piri left her cannabis in her parents' fridge. Villiers made "On & On", a liquid drum and bass song, shortly afterwards, lifting the song's drums from an earlier jump-up track which, according to Villiers, featured "grotty Belgian bass". They performed the song as part of their The Great Escape Festival set in May 2022.

Piri & Tommy signed to Polydor Records in June 2022, who released "On & On" the following month. The record was first played as BBC Radio 1's "Hottest Record" and the track was later added to Capital Dance's playlist. The track went viral on TikTok; by February 2023, the song had been used in over 35,000 videos. In September 2022, the pair announced their debut project Froge.mp3; to promote it, the pair uploaded a music video for "On & On" on 12 October 2022 in which Piri suffered a hallucinogenic episode after accidentally eating a hot dog with a frog in it.

== Reception ==
"Soft vocals roll over a liquid DnB beat and textural garage-esque synths, with the hook, ‘Big night, lost my weed, but the beat goes on,’ swallowing you up into mellowed-out dancefloor bliss. It’s unpretentious, it’s irresistibly catchy, but most importantly, it’s fun."

— Chiara Wilkinson of Time Out in 2022

Chiara Wilkinson of Time Out described the song as "a banger and a half", while Alison Craig of The Forty Five compared the track to PinkPantheress and wrote that the track "cemented their knack for bringing UK garage-inspired beats into the modern age". She also complemented the song's "relatably shit-faced lyrics ('Big night, lost my weed, but the beat goes on and on and on and on ...')", as did Sam Moore of NME, who noted that "Piri's 'on and on and on and on and on and on and on and on' will be stuck in your head forever" and described her vocals as "serene".

Krystal Rodriguez of Billboard described it as a "hybrid of sugary pop and aqueous drum & bass [that] perfectly bottles the peak-summer essence of muggy days and sleepless nights". That publication rated it as one of "The 50 Best Dance Songs Of 2022", while Dancing Bears included it on their "The 101 Best Singles of 2022" list and Time Out, The Forty Five, and NME rated the track as the seventh, 45th, and 31st best song of 2022.

In November 2022, the track charted at number 99 on the UK singles chart and BBC Radio 1 nominated it for "Hottest Record of the Year". Writing in 2023, Borys Dejnarowicz described "On & On" as "tastier than chocolate-covered potato chips and nowhere near as fattening", opined that it was the best track on Froge.mp3, and argued that Kenya Grace's "Afterparty Lover" was a thematic reverse of the song.

== Track listing ==
Digital single

1. "On & On" – 2:15

Extended mix

1. "On & On" – 3:36

Sammy Virji remix

1. "On & On" – 2:11

Sudley remix

1. "On & On" – 4:32

Apple Home Music Session

1. "On & On" – 2:24
2. "Unlock It" – 3:13

Acoustic version

1. "On & On" – 2:24

Instrumental version

1. "On & On" – 1:00

== Personnel ==
- Piri – vocals
- Tommy Villiers – production, mixing
- Stuart Hawkes – mastering

== Charts ==
Chart performance for "On & On"
Chart (2022)	Peak position
UK Dance (OCC)	28
UK Singles (OCC)	99

== Release history ==
Release history for "On & On"
Region	Version	Date	Format	Label	Ref.
Various	Original version	28 July 2022	Digital download; streaming	Polydor	
Various	Extended mix	29 July 2022	Digital download	Polydor	
Various	Apple Home Music Session	13 September 2022	Digital download	Polydor	
Various	Acoustic version	4 November 2022	Streaming	Polydor	
Various	Sammy Virji remix	23 September 2022	Digital download; streaming	Polydor	
Various	Sudley remix	7 October 2022	Digital download; streaming	Polydor	
Various	Instrumental	19 August 2024	Digital download; streaming	Polydor	
