= Tommy Villiers =

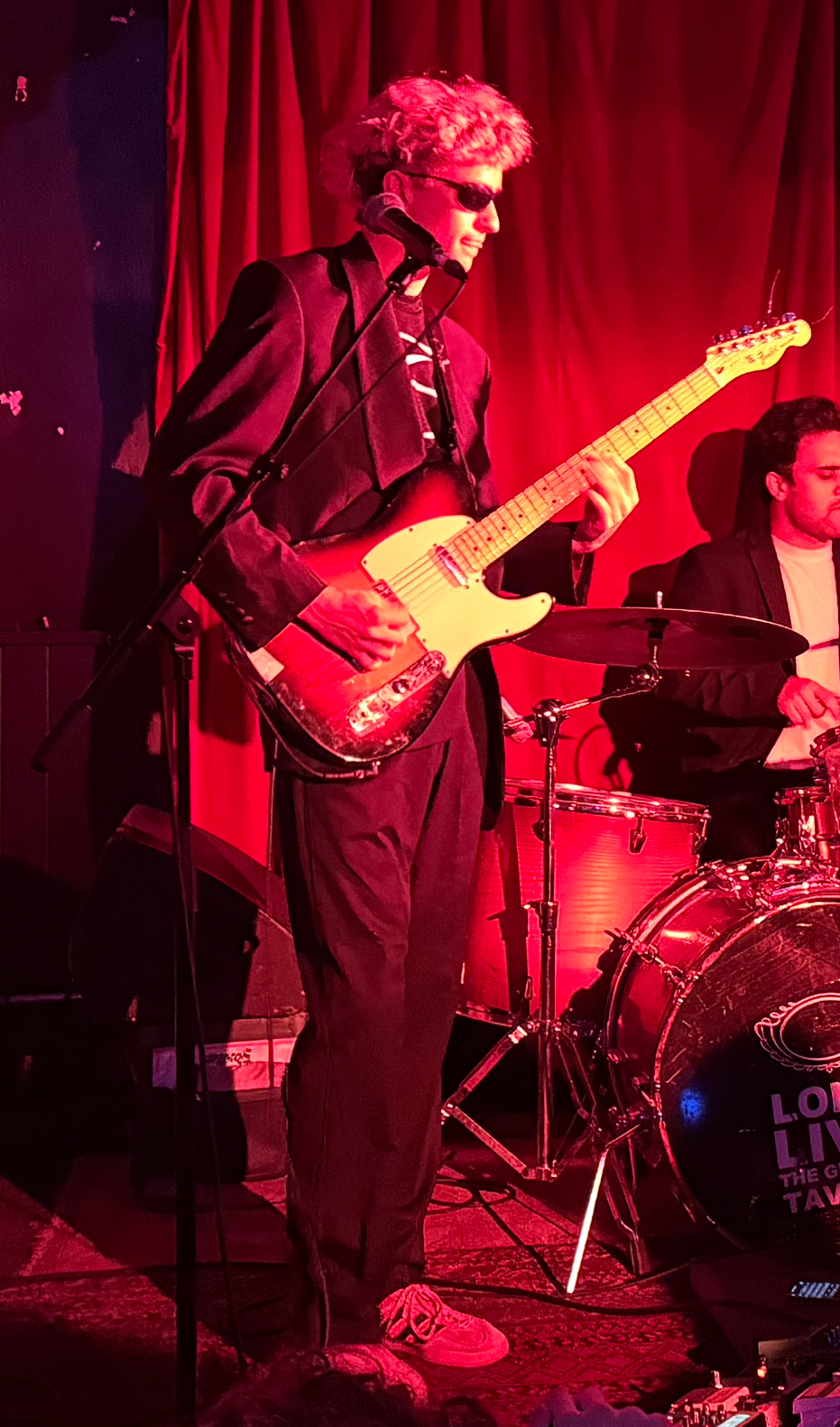
- Villiers performing in London, 2024

Background information
- Also known as: Froge
- Born: Thomas George Villiers
- Occupations: Singer; songwriter; producer; guitarist; trumpeter
- Labels: EMI; Polydor; Tim & Danny Music
- Member of: See Thru Hands
- Formerly of: Porij; Room C; Piri & Tommy

Thomas George Villiers is an English musician from Saffron Walden. After being introduced to dance music via his brother, he began producing drum and bass tracks and uploading them to SoundCloud. While at the Royal Northern College of Music, he joined See Thru Hands and cofounded Porij, with whom he released one and two EPs respectively. In mid-2020, he formed Piri & Tommy with Piri, with whom he released the mixtape Froge.mp3, which they promoted with Froge.tour, and several singles including "Soft Spot", "Beachin", "On & On", "Feel It", "Updown", and "Nice 2 Me". He also played the anti-hero in the music video for Wet Leg's "Ur Mum" and has released several singles including a remix of LF System's "Afraid to Feel".

== Life and career ==
=== Early life ===
Thomas George Villiers grew up in Saffron Walden and attended Saffron Walden County High School. He was a fan of the Red Hot Chili Peppers growing up and started a funk rock band in school, Room C. In 2016, he played at that year's Justice Service for the County of Essex. When he was in sixth form, his older brother began taking him to house parties, where he developed an interest in dance music. After receiving a Mac and deciding he wanted to replicate what he was hearing, he began producing drum and bass tracks, uploading them to SoundCloud, and DJing at house parties.

=== Bands ===
Villiers attended the Royal Northern College of Music (RNCM), from which he holds a degree in popular music. While there, he joined the bands See Thru Hands and Porij. By January 2019, See Thru Hands had released an EP, Hot City/Connectivity, which David Sue of Manchester Evening News compared to Prince, Chic, Hot Chip, and New Order. A reviewer for DIY later described "Hot City" as "disco-inflected post-punk" and Paul Carr of PopMatters compared its introduction to that of Stevie Wonder's "Superstition".

Villiers set up Porij in early 2019 with other students from his RNCM course. Just before the second United Kingdom COVID-19 lockdown, he matched with Piri on Tinder; a couple of weeks later, one of Porij's photographers retweeted one of their photoshoots, prompting Piri to locate his Instagram account and ask him out. Their first date was at Piccadilly Gardens, at which they bonded over a shared love of disco. After it was realised that Piri could sing and Villiers could produce, they set about writing together. The first song they recorded, "Sunlight", was a house song. She later moved into his student house in Manchester and formed Piri & Tommy with him. Porij released the Breakfast EP in November 2020 and the Baby Face EP in September 2021. Villiers left this band in early 2022 to concentrate on Piri & Tommy, remaining in Porij long enough to gain writing credits on their third EP, Outlines.

Piri & Tommy released "It's a Match" in March 2021, a disco song made after both experimented with numerous genres. Their second song, June 2021's "Soft Spot", went viral on Spotify and TikTok, prompting EMI to sign them, re-release "Soft Spot", and release the singles "Beachin" in January 2022 and "Words" in April 2022. They then signed to Polydor Records, who released "On & On" in July 2022 and then the mixtape Froge.mp3 in October 2022. The latter took its name from a nickname they used to give each other and featured "Sunlight", "Soft Spot", "Beachin", "Words", "On & On", and "Player 2", with Villiers providing lead vocals on the last of these. They promoted the mixtape with Froge.tour, which ran from 2 to 19 November. A week after the tour finished, the pair split up and did not talk to each other until April 2023, though Robin Murray of Clash reported in January 2023 that Piri and Villiers would release previously recorded music and planned to work together in the future.

Later that month, they featured on MJ Cole's "Feel It", to which Villiers contributed a guitar solo. Piri and Villiers followed this with "Updown" in February 2023 and "Nice 2 Me" in May 2023. In July 2023, the pair released "Lovergirl" as independent artists, followed by "Bluetooth" in October and "Christmas Time" in November. In August 2024, they announced an EP and released the liquid drum and bass track "99%" from it. The following month, having remixed Lucy Tun's "Come to My House", they announced that the EP would be called About Dancing and released the dance-pop track "Dog". About Dancing was released that November.

=== Solo career ===
In April 2022, Villiers played the anti-hero in the music video for Wet Leg's "Ur Mum", directed by Lava La Rue. In an interview in June 2023, he stated that he got the job after supporting Nine8 Collective (Note: Nine8 Collective is a group composed of Lava La Rue, Mac Wetha, Bone Slim, Biig Piig, Nayana Iz, Nige and LorenzoRSV.) and after being interviewed for the role in the venue's green room by La Rue. By September 2022, he had released a remix of LF System's "Afraid to Feel"; that month, he signed a solo publishing deal in September 2022 with Tim & Danny Music. In November 2022, he released a remix of "Noodle Poodle" by Nine8 Collective. By July 2023, he had released "Not Puzzled" featuring Ceòl-Min; that month, he released "To the Moon" with Hertfordshire-based rapper Mustbejohn, a song about the possibilities of a night out. By August 2024, he had released "Top Bins" with KiLLOWEN.

== Artistry ==
In May 2021, Villiers cited Coco Bryce as an inspiration on the grounds that no two of his breaks were the same. "To the Moon" was inspired by the UK garage and Brazilian music he and Mustbejohn were listening to during studio sessions. Dork wrote in August 2024 that Villiers took inspiration from "everything from Daft Punk music videos to black midi press shoots".

== Discography ==
=== Mixtapes ===
Title	Details
Froge.mp3 (Piri & Tommy)	Released: 21 October 2022; Label: Polydor; Format: Digital download, streaming

=== Singles ===
==== As lead artist ====
Singles as lead artist
Title	Year	Album	Ref.
"Change a Thing"	2019	Non-album singles	
"Poinciana"	2020	Non-album singles	
"Soft Spot" (Piri & Tommy Villiers)	2021	Froge.mp3	
"Beachin" (Piri & Tommy)	2022	Froge.mp3	
"Words" (Piri & Tommy)	2022	Froge.mp3	
"On & On" (Piri & Tommy)	2022	Froge.mp3	
"Unlock It" (Piri & Tommy)	2022	Non-album singles	
"Not Puzzled" (Tommy Villiers & Ceòl-Mìn)	2022	Non-album singles	
"Updown" (Piri & Tommy Villiers)	2023	Non-album singles	
"Nice 2 Me" (Piri & Tommy Villiers)	2023	Non-album singles	
"To the Moon" (Tommy Villiers & Mustbejohn)	2023	Non-album singles	
"Lovergirl" (Piri & Tommy)	2023	Non-album singles	
"Strangers to Lovers" (Tommy Villiers & Nat Slater)	2023	Non-album singles	
"Bluetooth" (Piri & Tommy)	2023	Non-album singles	
"Christmas Time" (Piri & Tommy)	2023	Non-album singles	
"Marmalade (For Your Love)" (Flourish & Tommy Villiers)	2024	Embrace	
"Top Bins" (Tommy Villiers & KiLLOWEN)	2024	Non-album singles	
"99%" (Piri & Tommy)	2024	Non-album singles	
"Dog" (Piri & Tommy)	2024	Non-album singles	
"Lemons" (Piri & Tommy ft. Scruz)	2025	Non-album singles	
"Fruit Machine" (Piri & Tommy)	2025	Non-album singles	
"Lights Off"/"Bullet" (Piri & Tommy)	2025	Non-album singles	
"Someone" (Piri & Tommy)	2025	Non-album singles	

==== As featured artist ====
Singles as featured artist
Title	Year	Album	Ref.
"Feel It" (MJ Cole featuring Piri & Tommy Villiers)	2023	Non-album singles	
"Garage Talk (Ur Dun Out)" (Bone Slim & Tommy Villiers)	2023	Non-album singles	
"Pieces" (Tomcbumpz featuring Piri & Tommy)	2025	Non-album singles	
"Heavy Handed" (Denham Audio featuring Piri & Tommy Villiers)	2025	Non-album singles	

=== Writing credits ===
Song	Year	Artist	Co-writers	Ref.
"It's a Match"	2021	Piri	Sophie McBurnie	
"Morning Blues"	2023	Emzo	Emilion Buckz, Sophie McBurnie	

=== Remixes ===
Song	Year	Artist	Co-producers	Album	Ref.
"Boxes"	2018	Darcie	None	Non-album singles	
"Tiptoeing"	2021	Hope Tala	None	Non-album singles	
"Border Control"	2022	See Thru Hands	None	Non-album singles	
"Circles"	2022	B-ahwe	None	Motions Remixes	
"Afraid to Feel"	2022	LF System	None	Non-album single	
"Noodle Poodle"	2022	NiNE8	None	98 Nights	
"Looking for Love"	2023	Disclosure	None	Alchemy (The Remixes)	
"Head"	2023	Maisi, Piri	None	Non-album singles	
"Come to My House"	2024	Lucy Tun	Piri	Non-album singles	
"Know Better"	2024	India Shan, Jake Elliott	None	Non-album singles	
"Thunder"	2025	Mackwood, Eerf Evil, Kianja	None	Non-album singles	

=== Other credits ===
Album	Year	Artist	Notes
Garage Classical	2019	DJ Spoony	Villiers played guitar on this album, which included "Flowers", which charted at numbers 48 and 26 on the UK Albums Chart and UK Dance Singles Chart.
