= Beachin =

Single by Piri & Tommy

from the album Froge.mp3
- Released: 28 January 2022
- Genre: Jungle
- Length: 3:14 (original); 3:46 (Skream remix)
- Label: EMI
- Songwriters: Piri; Tommy Villiers
- Producer: Tommy Villiers

Piri & Tommy singles chronology
"Soft Spot" (2021)	"Beachin" (2022)	"Words" (2022)

Music video
- "Beachin" (acoustic live) on YouTube

"Beachin" (stylised in lowercase) is a jungle track by Piri & Tommy. Originally intended for late October 2021, the track was eventually released on 28 January 2022 through EMI as their second single from Froge.mp3. The track describes a trip the pair had taken to Formby beach and ends with a spoken word section discussing the creation of sand sculptures. The track received positive reception from Matthew Perpetua and from reviewers from Clash and The Sunday Times. Skream later released an abstract remix of the song.

== History ==
In June 2021, Piri & Tommy released "Soft Spot", which went viral on TikTok and Spotify, prompting EMI to sign the pair and re-release the track. The success of the single caused Tommy to suffer from impostor syndrome. "Beachin", their follow up, was written after a trip to Formby beach in Liverpool, and Piri's lyrics were an attempt at encapsulating how much they enjoyed the trip and how close they felt afterwards. The song was Tommy's attempt at making a jungle track, which he later annotated with guitar. The track ends with a spoken word section from a video of the trip which discusses the creation of sand sculptures.

"Beachin" was originally intended for late October, but was delayed due to the success of "Soft Spot", and was instead released on 28 January 2022. Piri promoted the song by releasing videos to TikTok with the song playing in the background, resulting in several other videos using the song, which prompted the creation of a corresponding dance. The song was first played on Unity Radio on Jasper Hopkins' Breakfast show, with Capital Dance later adding it to its playlist. Skream later produced an abstract remix for the song. In October 2022, the track appeared on their debut project Froge.mp3.

== Reception ==
"“Beachin’” is extremely mellow at a high tempo, a dreamy moonlit ballad set to beats that sound like they’ve been yanked from a Roni Size record from the late 90s. Tommy Villiers’ production is rich with details but feels a lot more breezy than busy, judiciously doling out bass notes and never lets the vibey atmosphere of the lead guitar or keyboard washes thicken into a dense fog. Piri sings with very modern English R&B inflections – a lot of restraint and no showy runs, but with an elegant soulfulness in smaller moments. She fits perfectly in Villiers’ track, matching the tone for the most low-key parts while adding a boldness when the bass and breakbeats really hit." [sic]

— Matthew Perpetua in February 2022

On 31 January 2022, BBC Radio 1 announced it as that day's "Hottest Record". Robin Murray of Clash described the song as a "divine pop moment" and a "delicious return soaked in trop-pop textures", and noted that the song's "addictive guitar line unfolds over those head-rush beats, with piri's voice moving from sighing refrain to effects-laden spoken word" [sic]. Dan Cairns of The Sunday Times described it as "just as limpet-like" as "Soft Spot" and "a song that both suspends and turns back time", described "the combination of classic soul guitar, dubby bass and serpentine melody" as "pure musical escapism", and likened it to "the Nineties colliding with the 2020s".

Reviewing Froge.mp3, Paul Simpson of AllMusic complimented the song's "appl[ication of] atmospheric guitars to deep, rolling grooves". A slightly more lukewarm review, however, came from The Soundboard Stereo, who described the rest of froge.mp3 as "generally likable as background music [...] outside of some detail on beachin that a sound like this is not in any way equipped to convey (for example: “I got him bussin’, he makin’ some mayo”)." Izzy Morris of LeftLion used a review of a Froge.tour concert to describe the track as a "summery anthem [which] instantly invited [the crowd] to return to that wildly missed festival feeling that the pair entirely capture within their work".

== Track listing ==
Digital single

1. "Beachin" (Piri & Tommy) – 3:14

Skream remix

1. "Beachin" (Skream Remix) – 3:46
2. "Beachin" (Piri & Tommy) – 3:14

== Personnel ==
- Piri – vocals
- Tommy Villiers – production, mastering
- Jonny Breakwell – mixing

== Release history ==
Release history for "Beachin"
Region	Date	Format	Version	Label	Ref.
Various	28 January 2022	Digital download; streaming	Original version	EMI	
Various	11 March 2022	Digital download; streaming	Skream Remix	EMI	
