= Froge.mp3 =

Mixtape by Piri & Tommy
- Released: 21 October 2022
- Recorded: 2020–2022
- Length: 35:46
- Label: Polydor
- Producer: Tommy Villiers

Singles from Froge.mp3
- 1. "Soft Spot" Released: June 2021; 2. "Beachin" Released: January 2022; 3. "Words" Released: April 2022; 4. "On & On" Released: July 2022

Froge.mp3 (/froʊɡ/) is the debut mixtape by Piri & Tommy. Released on 21 October 2022 and on vinyl on 22 April 2023 on Polydor Records, the mixtape contains "Sunlight", previous singles "Soft Spot", "Beachin", "Words", and "On & On", focus track "Say It", and six additional tracks. The album was promoted by both Froge.tour, a nine-date tour, and Froge.tv, a twelve-episode YouTube Shorts series. Critical reception was broadly positive, with Gigwise describing the album as the 45th best album of 2022, NME rating it amongst the twenty best mixtapes and EPs of 2022, and Ellie Dixon rating it as her favourite album of the year. Additionally, the mixtape charted at No. 13 on the UK Dance Albums Chart.

== Background ==
In 2020, just before the second United Kingdom COVID-19 lockdown, Piri matched on Tinder with Tommy Villiers, a member of the band Porij. A couple of weeks later, one of the band's photographers retweeted one of their photo shoots, prompting her to find his Instagram account and ask him out. At the time, Piri was in a phase of drawing frogs and toads, and they started calling each other 'froge' (/froʊɡ/) as a nickname. Later, a crocheted frog hat would become part of Piri's signature look. They began writing songs together after they realised that Piri could sing and Villiers could produce, starting with "Sunlight".

== Release and promotion ==
Each song (in both lyrics and vibe) captures a different point in time of our journey, and the different experiences and emotions we were going through. We really wanted to avoid guiding or limiting ourselves too much during the creative process: we made whatever we felt like, just for fun, and I can definitely feel that energy of us enjoying being creative and with no pressure when listening back. It’s so cool having a collection of tracks to document parts of our lives in that way, like a little time capsule.

—Piri

In June 2021, the pair released "Soft Spot", which went viral on TikTok and Spotify, prompting EMI to sign the pair, re-release the track, and release "Beachin" in January 2022 and "Words" in April 2022. Polydor Records later signed them and released "On & On" in July 2022, for which a music video was released that featured Piri ingesting a hallucinogenic frog. Piri & Tommy announced their debut project in September 2022. At the time, the project was intended as a mixtape, rather than an album, as the tracks had been made as singles.

Froge.mp3 was released on 21 October 2022. Promotion for the mixtape included a nine-date tour, Froge.tour, in November 2022. In addition, the pair uploaded a twelve episode YouTube Shorts series, froge.tv, in which Piri and Villiers explained what the album's songs were written about. The mixtape's focus track, "Say It", was added to the Capital Dance playlist. All of the tracks featured Piri on lead vocals, with Villiers providing lead vocals on "Player 2".

== Reception ==
Any of these tracks would sound perfect at a beach rave, but the lyrics and hooks stick with you, and they stand up to repeated home listens. [...] Fresh, vibrant, and deeper than it might seem on the surface, froge.mp3 is a gem. [sic]

— Paul Simpson of AllMusic

Froge.mp3 charted at No. 13 on the UK Dance Albums Chart. Reviews for the album were broadly positive; Finlay Holden of Dork gave it five stars and called it an "air-tight, comprehensive taster of their potential", while Michelangelo Matos of The New Yorker called it "charming". Paul Simpson of AllMusic likened it to PinkPantheress' To Hell with It but with "a more Ibiza-friendly sound".

NME rated it amongst the twenty best mixtapes and EPs of 2022 and Gigwise described the album as the 45th best album of 2022. In January 2023, Ellie Dixon stated that Froge.mp3 was her "favourite album" of the year. A more lukewarm review came from Luke Nuttall of The Soundboard Stereo, who felt that little else was of the same standard as "On & On" and that the mixtape's "very light, tactile pop / drum 'n' bass" was "not in any way equipped to convey" some of the lyrics on "Beachin" such as "I got him bussin', he makin' some mayo".

== Track listing ==
Side one
No.	Title	Subject	Length
1.	"Silver Lining"	Entering a long-distance relationship	2:34
2.	"On & On"	Their experience at the end of Parklife Festival (Note: For it being their first experience at the end of a festival, see.; For the fact that said festival was Parklife Festival, see.)	2:15
3.	"Soft Spot"	Piri's inability to control her feelings for Villiers	3:43
4.	"Settle"	Post-breakup disenchantment	2:42
5.	"Words"	Communication problems	3:10
6.	"Slowly But Surely"	Wondering when to express affection	3:06
7.	"Say It"	Being scared to say 'I love you' too early	2:58
8.	"Can We"	Struggles to find the right team	2:36
9.	"Easy"	Comfort within a relationship	3:08
10.	"Player 2"	Villiers' departure from his previous band	3:00
11.	"Beachin"	Trip to Formby beach	3:15
12.	"Sunlight"	Early dates	3:14
Total length:			35:46

== Personnel ==
Credits adapted from the album's liner notes.

Musicians

- Piri – lead vocals
- Tommy Villiers – vocals (4, 10), mixing (all except 11), mastering (3, 11)
- Jonny Breakwell – mixing (11)
- Stuart Hawkes – mastering (all except 3 and 11)

== Charts ==
Chart performance for Froge.mp3
Chart (2022)	Peak position
UK Dance Albums (OCC)	13

== Release history ==
Release history for Froge.mp3
Region	Date	Format	Artist	Label	Ref.
Various	21 October 2022	Digital download; streaming	Piri & Tommy	Polydor	
Various	22 April 2023	Vinyl	Piri & Tommy	Polydor	
