= Unlock It =

2017 promotional single by Charli XCX

Promotional single by Charli XCX featuring Kim Petras and Jay Park

from the album Pop 2
- Released: 11 December 2017
- Genre: Art pop
- Length: 3:52
- Label: Asylum
- Songwriters: Charlotte Aitchison; Aaron Aguilar; Alexander Guy Cook; Kim Petras; Jay Park
- Producers: A. G. Cook; Life Sim

Visualizer
- "Unlock It" on YouTube

"Unlock It" is a song by British singer Charli XCX featuring German singer Kim Petras and American rapper Jay Park. It was released on 11 December 2017 as the first promotional single from Charli XCX's fourth mixtape, Pop 2 (2017). The track samples A. G. Cook's "Beautiful" and premiered on Zane Lowe's Beats 1 show on the day of release. Reviewers praised "Unlock It", especially its lyrics. A mashup of the song with Tinashe's "Superlove" went viral on TikTok in 2021, shortly after which Charli XCX renamed the track "Unlock It (Lock It)". In 2022, Piri & Tommy released a cover that Vice rated as the 14th best song of 2022.

== Background and release ==
Charli XCX scrapped her planned third studio album, christened XCX World by fans, after it was leaked. She first mentioned the idea of making Pop 2 to A. G. Cook in late September 2017 while he was in New York. The pair started work once Cook was back in London and recorded the body of it at Oven Studios, with the whole mixtape taking two months. After implying that she had recorded a mixtape with Kim Petras, Jay Park, Carly Rae Jepsen, Tove Lo, Dorian Electra, Alma, Mykki Blanco, Cupcakke, Tommy Cash, Brooke Candy, Caroline Polachek, Pabllo Vittar, MØ, and A. G. Cook, she announced the mixtape on 8 December 2017 and released its lead single, "Out of My Head" featuring Tove Lo and Alma.

On 11 December, Charli XCX followed this with "Unlock It", which premiered on Zane Lowe's Beats 1 show that day. The song featured Petras, who Charli XCX had met at a Sophie concert, and Park, who had previously featured in the music video for her earlier track "Boys". Charli XCX used her Beats 1 interview to state that she had hired Park on the basis of how well he had gone down when the "Boys" video was published. Charli XCX wrote her contribution about her experiences of driving in New Jersey around the time she was supporting Halsey on her Hopeless Fountain Kingdom Tour and its lyrics invite the listener to fall in love. Produced by Cook and Life Sim, the song features a spoken word chorus that contains the phrase "Unlock It" 18 times and samples Cook's earlier track "Beautiful" as he felt the song was missing something. The song's title on streaming platforms was changed to "Unlock It (Lock It)" on 2 May 2021.

== Reception ==
Megan Burger of Pitchfork described the track as "art-pop at its finest, just shy of parody but hyper-aware of contemporary trends", and its lyrics as "over-the-top and blissfully artificial". Ross McNeilage of MTV News wrote that "If you want my love / Twerk to unlock it!" was one of the best lyrics of 2017. The song was released two days before "I Got It" featuring Cupcakke, Brooke Candy, and Pabllo Vittar and four days before the release of its parent mixtape Pop 2. A mashup of the song with Tinashe's "Superlove" by Jeff Prior, a resident DJ at queer dance party Ctrl, went viral on TikTok in 2021 after being used in an accompanying dance on TikTok, eventually soundtracking 2,400,000 videos. By 6 April, the track had been streamed 20,000,000 times and had been added to Spotify's Viral Hits playlist.

The song's 2021 rename was criticised by fans, following which Charli XCX took to Twitter to discuss the relationship between artists and fans. The following year, Clash described the song as one of Charli XCX's best 17 songs, and wrote that the song had a "power chorus, pure electronic happiness, bold, computerized melodies, and lyrics that offer cosmic escapism", and offered particular praise for the line "cosmic kiss, tastes like cherry maraschino", calling it "sweetly satisfying". In 2024, Adam Graham of The Detroit News described the song as "an annoyingly catchy earworm that latches onto your brain and refuses to let go".

== Personnel ==
Musicians

- Charli XCX – lead vocals
- Kim Petras – lead vocals
- Jay Park – lead vocals
- A. G. Cook – programming
- Aaron Aguilar – composer
- Life Sim – synthesizer

Production

- A. G. Cook – producer, engineer
- Life Sim – producer
- Stuart Hawkes – mastering engineer
- Geoff Swan – mixer
- Brendan Morawski – engineer

== Release history ==
Release history for "Unlock It"
Region	Date	Version	Label	Ref.
Various	11 December 2017	Digital download; streaming	Asylum	

== Piri & Tommy version ==
"Unlock It"

Single by Piri & Tommy
- Released: 11 November 2022
- Genre: Bubblegum pop; drum and bass
- Length: 3:13
- Label: Polydor
- Songwriters: Charlotte Aitchison; Aaron Aguilar; Alexander Guy Cook; Kim Petras; Jay Park
- Producers: A. G. Cook; Life Sim

Audio video
- "Unlock It" on YouTube

Piri & Tommy, who had previously opened for Charli XCX at a Brighton concert, released a cover version of the song on 11 November 2022. The track had been recorded and previously released for an Apple Music Home Session, in which artists make music at home. Aisha Sembhi of Indiependent.co.uk described the track as a "blend [of] bubblegum pop and drum & bass". Clash described the song as "reminiscent of the original [but] deliver[ing] a more laidback edge" and described Piri's vocals as "silky smooth, laced in AutoTune, [and] bathed in reverb and delay" and the track's production as "clean and polished" with lo-fi drums. In addition, their version of the song was rated as the fourteenth best song of 2022 by Vice.

=== Track listing ===
Apple Music Home Session

1. "On & On" (acoustic version) – 2:24
2. "Unlock It" – 3:13

Single version

1. "Unlock It" – 3:13

=== Personnel ===
- Piri – lead vocals
- Tommy Villiers – mastering, producer

=== Release history ===
Release history for "Unlock It"
Region	Version	Date	Format	Label	Ref.
Various	Apple Home Music Session	13 September 2022	Digital download	Polydor	
Various	Original version	11 November 2022	Digital download; streaming	Polydor	
