= Parthenope Wald-Harding =

English musician (born 2002)

Parthenope
- Born: Parthenope Ann Wald-Harding; 2002 (age 23–24); Swillington, England
- Occupations: Singer; songwriter; flautist; saxophonist; violinist
- Years active: 2015–present
- Member of: Loud LDN

Parthenope Ann Wald-Harding (/pɜːrθɛnoʊpiː/) (born 2002), usually credited as Parthenope, is an English musician and singer. She is best known for her cover of Norah Jones's "Don't Know Why", and is a member of Loud LDN.

== Early life ==
Parthenope Ann Wald-Harding (/pɜːrθɛnoʊpiː/) was born in 2002 in Swillington and attended Chetham's School of Music in Manchester, where she studied jazz saxophone, and Guildhall School of Music and Drama. Her mother, Hayley, worked in a music centre.

Wald-Harding was initially a violinist, which she played from the age of eleven after being gifted an 1804 Joseph Strauss by a violin teacher, but switched to alto saxophone after hearing her sister, Milly, play with a jazz ensemble, and after her mother received a shipment of instruments to sell, including an alto saxophone which she found she could not shift. In January 2020, she left her violin on a rack above her seat on a Manchester Victoria train; after her mother's Twitter appeal to find it went viral, she found it at the station's lost property office. Later that year, she won an art competition, the Welcome Back Project, which invited applicants to design an advert inviting punters to return to Leeds.

== Career ==
When she was thirteen, The Press noted that she and her sister Milly were members of Yorkshire Young Sinfonia, a Yorkshire-based youth orchestra. In September 2020, she played Monterey Jazz Festival as part of Next Generation Women in Jazz Combo. On 29 January 2021, Wald-Harding played flute on Celeste's "The Promise", from her album Not Your Muse, where she was credited as Parthenope Wald-Harding. Later that year, Wald-Harding featured on two tracks by DJ Alex FB: "Guessing Game", also featuring Nate Gordon and Kya, on 29 May 2021, and "Again and Again", also featuring Harry Linacre, on 24 July 2021. On 22 October 2021, she featured on Pastel's "Papaya", from the compilation album College Music Presents: Back on Track, released the same day.

On 30 September 2022, she released a cover version of Norah Jones' "Don't Know Why", which appeared on the compilation album Blue Note Re:imagined II; as part of a review for said album, KNKX noted that she "stays mostly faithful to Jones' original coffee shop vibe but adds her generational perspective with a more introverted vocal reading and sharp, concise saxophone solos", and likened it to "a coffee shop with free wi-fi, charging stations and great music". In November 2022, she performed at Froge.tour. On 30 March 2023, she released "City Life", and on 28 April 2023, she released "What You Wanted"; both featured on her four-track 2 June 2023 EP Go Somewhere Alone. On 5 April 2023, she played flute on Zak Abel's "Dance With You (Comeback)", and on 16 April 2023, she performed at Brick Lane Jazz Festival with Vertaal and Harry Pearce. On 9 June 2023, Wald-Harding co-wrote three tracks on Hak Baker's album Worlds End FM, "Dying to Live", "Almost Lost London" and "The End of the World", and on 13 October 2023, she featured on "Portofino", from Gotts Street Park's album On the Inside.

== Artistry ==
Wald-Harding is influenced by Michael Brecker's "Pilgrimage", having received it as a Christmas gift; her writing style is influenced by Men I Trust. As of January 2023, she is dating Harry Pearce, a bassist and composer. She is a member of Loud LDN.
