= Updown =

Single by Piri & Tommy Villiers
- Released: 17 February 2023
- Genre: Hyperpop
- Length: 2:45
- Label: Polydor
- Songwriters: Piri; Tommy Villiers
- Producers: Tommy Villiers; Piri

Piri & Tommy Villiers singles chronology
"Feel It" (2023)	"Updown" (2023)	"Nice 2 Me" (2023)

Music video
- "Updown" (official video) on YouTube

"Updown" (stylised in lowercase) is a hyperpop song single by Piri & Tommy Villiers. Released on 17 February 2023 on Polydor Records, the song was written about cowgirl sex and was performed during live sets prior to release. Upon release, the song received airplay from BBC Radio 1 and Capital Dance and was reviewed by reviewers from Impact, Dancing Bears, and Clash. A music video was released on 2 March.

== Background ==
In 2020, just before the second United Kingdom COVID-19 lockdown, Piri matched on Tinder with Tommy Villiers. A couple of weeks later, one of the band's photographers retweeted one of their photo shoots, prompting her to find his Instagram account and ask him out. They released the mixtape Froge.mp3 in October 2022, which they promoted the following month with Froge.tour. A week after that, they split up and did not talk to each other for several months, reuniting as friends in April 2023.

== Recording and release ==
The band recorded "Updown" in early 2022. A hyperpop song, Piri wrote the song about having cowgirl sex with Villiers and made part of the song's chorus, "I take it updown updown updown updown", after accidentally copying and pasting her vocals. Villiers added a drop to the track during preparation for Piri & Tommy live sets. The band released the song on 17 February 2023, upon which BBC Radio 1 announced it as that day's "Hottest Record" and Capital Dance added it to its playlist. On 2 March 2023, the band released a video directed by Ayla Spaans.

== Reception ==
Izzy Morris reviewed the song twice. Reviewing a Froge.tour concert for LeftLion, she complimented Piri's "exploration of her 'hyperpop era'". However, when she reviewed the single for Impact, she opined that while the track was "perfectly built for a dancefloor", she found Piri's comparison to other women misogynistic and gave the song 2.5 stars out of 5. Simon Meyer-Horn of Dancing Bears felt that the song's drop was the best bit of the song, though felt that it was "just a little too light to really get us excited" and opined that Piri's "monotonous vocals" contributed little to the track's "very bland" instrumental. A more positive review, however, came from Robin Murray of Clash, who described it as "a dose of rave-fuelled female empowerment" and complimented Piri's "biting vocal" and the track's "daring production elements".

== Personnel ==
- Piri – vocals
- Tommy Villiers – production, mixing
- Cass Irvine – mastering

== Release history ==
Release history for "Updown"
Region	Date	Version	Label	Ref.
Various	17 February 2023	Digital download; streaming	Polydor	
