= Maldon Mud Race =

Annual race across the River Blackwater in England

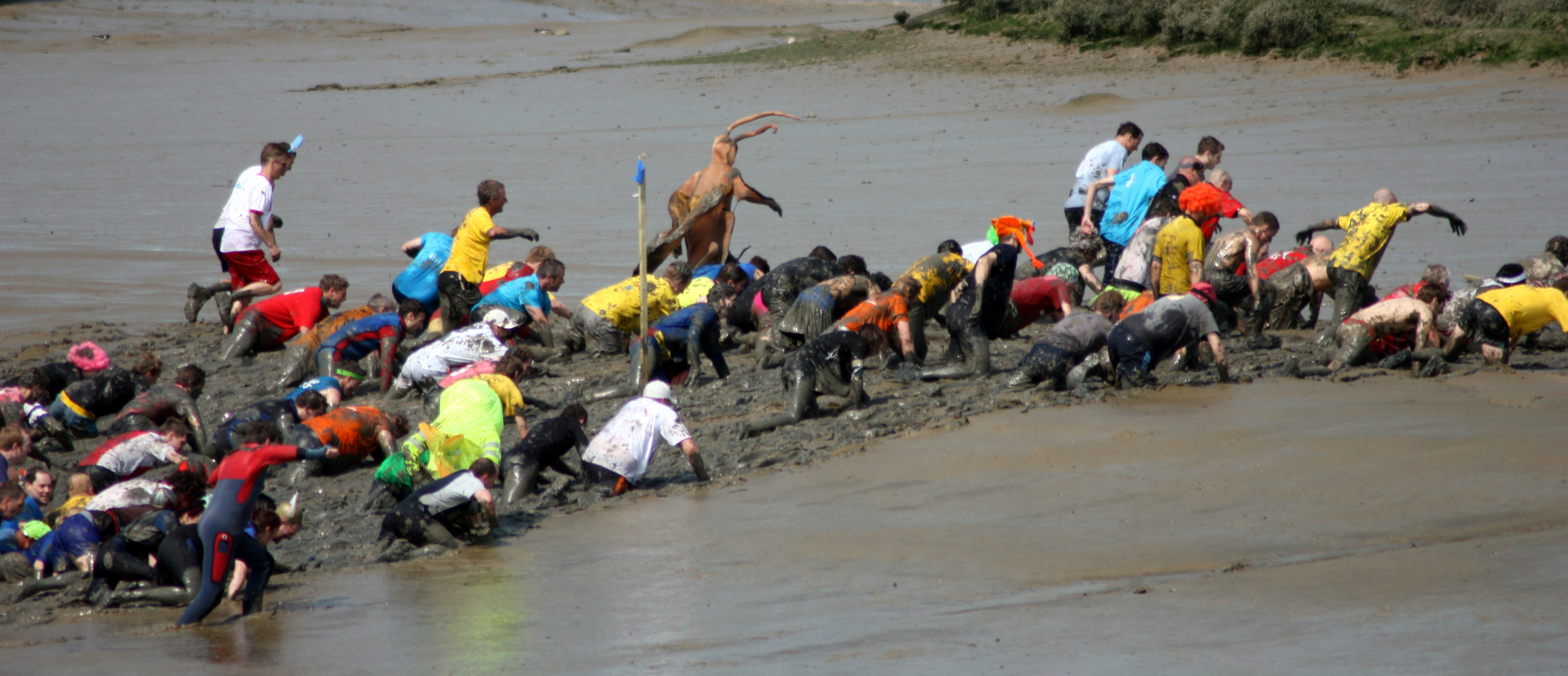
Maldon mud race. April 2011

The Maldon Mud Race is an annual fun race held in spring (originally in the winter, now in late April or early May) at Promenade Park in Maldon, Essex, England, in which entrants compete to complete a 500 metres (550 yd) dash, in thick mud, over the bed of the River Blackwater. The race is organised by the Maldon Mud Race committee, a team of volunteers, which raises money for charity.

== History ==
The Maldon mud race began in 1974 when a regular at a local pub was challenged to serve a meal on the riverbank dressed in a dinner jacket. The challenge evolved into a race across the river to a waiting barrel of beer, drinking a pint of beer there and racing back. The barrel of beer has long disappeared and the race has become a charity event, with many participants wearing fancy dress. The event is watched by thousands of spectators and raises tens of thousands of pounds for charity. The 2010 race was delayed until Easter 2011 due to poor weather and the organisers later decided to permanently move the event from winter to spring. Brian Farrington, from the Maldon Rotary Club said: "It doesn't make any difference in regard to the race itself, because people still get covered in mud. ... Our main concern is health and safety and then how much money we can raise for charity."

The race can only take place when the tide is low enough to allow participants to cross the river safely. Participants start from one bank and make their way to the other side, negotiate 200 metres of mud along the river and then return to the original river bank. In 2009, the race was run twice, on 4 January and 27 December, after the 2008 event was postponed due to high tides. About 250 competitors took part in the December 2009 event and it has increased in size every year since.

In 2012 the winner was Robert Cooper.

In 2014 the race was held on 26 May and once again attracted hundreds of competitors.

The 50th anniversary of the Maldon Mud Race occurred on 2 June 2024.

In 2026 the race was won by a 16 year old, by the name of Albert. The race also introduced the first ever Elite race, which was won by John Matthews.
