= Soft Spot (song) =

Single by Piri

from the album Froge.mp3
- Released: 4 June 2021
- Genre: Liquid drum and bass
- Length: 3:39 (original); 3:43 (subsequent); 3:51 (MJ Cole remix)
- Label: DistroKid
- Songwriters: Piri; Tommy Villiers
- Producer: Tommy Villiers

Piri singles chronology
| "It's a Match" (2021) | "Soft Spot" (2021) | "Feel It" (2023) |

Piri & Tommy Villiers singles chronology
| "Soft Spot" (2021) | "Beachin" (2022) |

Music video
- "Soft Spot" music video on YouTube "Soft Spot" acoustic music video on YouTube

"Soft Spot" (stylised in lowercase) is a liquid drum and bass song, first released independently on 4 June 2021, where it was credited to Piri. After she paid six TikTok creators to promote the song, the song was used in a video of a creator making a Japanese bench, which caused the song to go viral on that platform. Around this time, the track went viral on Spotify after featuring on the platform's "Fresh Finds" playlist. For this, EMI signed her and her producer Tommy Villiers and re-released the track under the name Piri & Tommy Villiers. The song appeared on the pair's 2022 mixtape Froge.mp3.

Critical reception for the song was overwhelmingly positive, with Pitchfork comparing Piri's voice with Ariana Grande, Rolling Stone listing it as the fifty-ninth best dance song of all time, and NME noting that the song was "right up there with PinkPantheress and, er, sea shanties" as one of TikTok’s "biggest hits". In addition, the song spent a week on the UK Independent Singles Breakers Chart at No. 20 and Charli XCX, PinkPantheress, Wet Leg, and Saint Etienne are fans of the song.

== Background ==
In 2020, just before the second United Kingdom COVID-19 lockdown, Piri matched on Tinder with Tommy Villiers, a member of the band Porij. A couple of weeks later, one of the band's photographers retweeted one of their photo shoots, prompting her to find his Instagram account and ask him out. Piri wrote "Soft Spot", a liquid drum and bass song with loon birds on it, about feeling powerless to Villiers and about feeling optimistic that their relationship would work out. PinkPantheress was a big inspiration for the record; Piri used a December 2021 NME article to state that the former had direct messaged the pair to tell them the song's "beat goes stupid".

== Promotion and release ==
The track was released on 4 June. Piri told Unity Radio in October 2021 that she paid six TikTok creators £20 to use the song in one of their videos, and took out adverts on Instagram and TikTok. The song went viral on TikTok after being featured in a video of a creator making a Japanese bench, which acquired 1,000,000 views, and eventually appeared in over 130,000 videos including those for pregnancy cravings, laminate floor fitting, gym workout montages, Korean scrambled eggs, and dysmenorrhea advice. The song also went viral on Spotify after being featured on its "Fresh Finds" playlist. For this, EMI signed them and re-released the track. EMI also released an official remix from MJ Cole, who provided the remix after Piri and Villiers sent a long list of suggested artists to their label, including bigger artists such as Cole, without expecting a response.

== Reception ==
"Soft Spot skips and bites on a shuffled, stuttered beat that draws the ear in a series of funky coughs and snaps. Heavily filtered pads pulse deep in the ambient, sunken deep into reverb, providing harmonic resonance throughout. A vox sample erupting into dub-style delay, scattered feedback cranks into the production; the bass line shifting and working the grind, holding a heavy dancehall groove."

—Freshonthenet.co.uk review

"Soft Spot" spent a week on the UK Independent Singles Breakers Chart, at No. 20. Rani Boyer wrote for Undergroundunderdogs.com that the song was "as sweet as it is addictive" and for Pigeons & Planes that the song was "infectious". Tobi, a reviewer for Tom Robinson's blog Freshonthenet.co.uk, noted that the song "dares you not to dance" and Charli XCX used a 24 August 2021 edition of BBC Radio 1's Future Sounds to air it and state that she ran to it at the gym. Reviewing subsequent single "Beachin", Dan Cairns of The Sunday Times noted that the song's "mix of skittering drum’n’bass and nostalgia-infused pop immediacy" stuck "like glue", while Thomas Smith of NME wrote in May 2022 that the song was "right up there with PinkPantheress and, er, sea shanties as one of [TikTok]’s biggest hits". Writing for a July 2022 Rolling Stone listicle that named the track as the fifty-ninth greatest dance song of all time, Michelangelo Matos called it a "twee starburst of liquid drum-and-bass". In March 2023, Wet Leg named it one of five songs that had soundtracked their year and the band's Rhian Teasdale noted that it took them back to when they were shooting their video for "Ur Mum", in which Villiers played the anti-hero.

Piri's voice came in for particular praise. Freshonthenet.co.uk noted that "Piri's voice dances in compelling vocal stack[, with] echoes cascading left/right, creating depth and ear candy", and noted that her "pop-sweet topline teas[ed] and contrast[ed] against the weight of the production". Pitchfork's Cat Zhang, who particularly enjoyed the way she "sigh[ed]" the chorus, described her voice as "light and hazy" and "skim[ming] over the fast-paced melody in the verses in a way that resembles Ariana Grande", while Saint Etienne, who stated that it was one of their favourite tracks of 2021, wrote that Piri's voice sounded "like Shampoo". Later reviews complimented the song's percussion. Alexis Petridis reviewed a November 2022 Froge.tour gig for The Guardian and wrote that "in its live incarnation at least", the track's breaks were "surprisingly tough", while Alex Rigotti of Gigwise stated that the Scala gig of that tour ended "with a genuinely incredible breakbeat" and wished that it "went on for way longer than it did".

== Music video ==
A music video was released on 4 June 2021, which features Piri singing, dancing, and pole dancing. She used an October 2021 Reform Radio interview to note that she had bought a projector especially for the occasion and that she filmed herself performing against the bedroom wall of the student house she was living in at the time and to "trippy liquid visuals" she had found on YouTube. She also stated that she had edited the video herself.

== Track listing ==
Digital single

1. "Soft Spot" (Piri) – 3:39

MJ Cole remix

1. "Soft Spot" (MJ Cole remix) – 3:51
2. "Soft Spot" (Piri & Tommy Villiers) – 3:43

== Personnel and credits ==
Personnel

- Piri – vocals
- Tommy Villiers – production, mastering, mixing

== Charts ==
Chart performance for "Soft Spot"
| Chart (2021) | Peak position |
|---|---|
| UK Independent Singles Breakers Chart | 20 |

== Release history ==
Release history for "Soft Spot"
| Region | Date | Format | Version | Artist | Label | Ref. |
|---|---|---|---|---|---|---|
| Various | 4 June 2021 | Digital download; streaming | Original version | Piri | DistroKid | |
| Various | 13 September 2021 | Digital download; streaming | Re-release | Piri & Tommy Villiers | EMI | |
| Various | 15 October 2021 | Digital download; streaming | MJ Cole remix | Piri & Tommy Villiers | EMI | |
