= Ellie Dixon =

English musician

- Born: Eleanor Charlotte Siobhan Dixon; Foxton, Cambridgeshire, England
- Genres: Alt-Pop, Indie Pop
- Occupations: Songwriter, Producer
- Label: Decca Records
- Member of: Loud LDN
- Website: www.elliedixonmusic.com

Eleanor Charlotte Siobhan Dixon, age 28–29 is an English musician. Born in Foxton, Cambridgeshire, she released three EPs while studying for a maths degree, then gigged for around six months and released two further singles. Following the COVID-19 lockdown in the United Kingdom shutting down the country's live event industry, she started uploading content to her social media, where she attracted attention for her deconstruction of song harmonies and original verses. She released Crikey! It's My Psyche in 2021 and signed to Decca Records in 2022. After going viral for her "Jota on the Wing" football chant in 2023, she released In Case of Emergency later that year, and in 2024, she featured on Charlieeeee's "Bumped in the Head". She is a member of Loud LDN and is noted for her use of unorthodox instrumentation, such as mugs, stationery, and kitchen equipment.

== Life and career ==
=== Early life and Crikey! It's My Psyche ===
Eleanor Charlotte Siobhan Dixon was born in Foxton, Cambridgeshire. Growing up, her father played piano and her mother played the tin whistle. She started producing music when she was thirteen after her father downloaded music production software onto the family's desktop, and took music GCSE, where her singing teacher encouraged her to perform at youth open mic nights; she also performed at her school's concert. Originally a pianist, she taught herself guitar after tiring of porting her keyboard to and from gigs. After leaving school, she read mathematics at the University of Warwick, as she felt her performance anxiety would occlude a music career; during each summer, she would release an EP, and these were "Looking Forward", "Jungle", and "Growing Pains". After graduating, she gigged for about six months until the COVID-19 lockdown in the United Kingdom. In November 2019, she released "Pressure", an ode to overcoming pressure, and in March 2020, she released "Ugly", a song about empowerment and self-love, which was accompanied by a music video.

After the COVID-19 lockdown caused the United Kingdom's live event industry to shut down in 2020, Dixon began to upload content to her social media. She used a March 2021 interview to state that she spent this period making money by producing other people's tracks and by teaching. Her content during this time included deconstruction of harmonies, such as for "Dancing Queen" by ABBA, and original verses for other people's songs, such as "Toxic" by Britney Spears; at the time, many artists were publishing instrumentals. One verse, written over an instrumental produced by Blue Lab Beats, became the second verse for "Space Out", which she released in July 2020, self-produced, and accompanied with a music video in which she wore an astronaut suit; in a December 2021 interview, she stated that she first looked for realistic space suits, found they were expensive, and then looked for "deliberately silly ones instead", selecting one that was inflatable.

In November 2020, Dixon released "New Waves", a duet with Austin Prince. In February 2021, she released "Sucker", a song about a teenage crush which was inspired by Harry Styles and accompanied by a music video in which she wore a heart suit, and in May 2021, she then released "Green Grass", a description of an existential crisis, for which a music video was released. Dixon then released Crikey! It's My Psyche, which featured "Green Grass", "Space Out!", "Sucker", and "CEO of Watching Television", a dig at workaholism which had been released with a video filmed in her flat. Dixon's mother came up with the name while brainstorming ideas while both were dog walking.

=== In Case of Emergency and "Jota on the Wing" ===
In March 2022, Dixon ran in slow-motion through King's Cross, London wearing a space suit and signed a giant Decca Records contract using a giant crayon. A sharp uptick of abuse on TikTok prompted her to abscond to an Airbnb in the Cotswolds for a week and be unable to look at her TikTok for two; whilst at the Airbnb, she wrote her first single on Decca, "Swing!", a belligerent baseball-based response to her attackers co-produced by Charlie Deakin Davies. A further single, "Big Lizard Energy", was released in February 2023 alongside a music video and a dinosaur-inspired video game, and was her attempt at responding to her habit of cognitive distortion by imagining herself as a 320-foot (98 m) dinosaur.

On 25 February 2023, Dixon appeared on Patrick Kielty's BBC Radio 5 Live show, broadcast just before a Scottish League Cup fixture between Celtic and Rangers. While there, she performed "Jota on the Wing", a football chant written to the tune of O-Zone's "Dragostea Din Tei", and about Jota, the Celtic winger. The song went viral on social media, prompting Celtic's social media account to use it to soundtrack a clip of Jota holding the trophy. She later performed the song at Celtic F.C. in front of 60,000 fans during a subsequent Celtic-Rangers fixture on 8 April.

In May 2023, she released "Dopamine", a song she had written shortly after reading an article about brains being desensitised to the chemical of the same name through excess consumption of social media, having debuted the track at a BBC Radio 2 session with Jo Whiley on 19 April. On 21 July, she released the single "Bounce", which she wrote around the same time as "Swing!" and also about the abuse she was suffering at the time, and the EP In Case of Emergency, which had been delayed from 16 June, and which included "Swing!", "Big Lizard Energy", "Dopamine", and "Bounce". In March 2024, she featured on Deakin Davies' "Bumped in the Head", which they released under the name Charlieeeee.

By October 2024, Dixon had been dropped by Decca; that month, she released "Renaissance", a track about coming back fighting. She followed this in January 2025 with "Guts", a track about being quiet, and in March 2025 with a remix of "Guts" featuring Piri. By May 2025, she had released the single "Knight Shift"; that month, she released "Loose Change", a track about her ADHD, and announced the EP Tales of a Knight, released in June 2025.

== Artistry and personal life ==
Critics have described Dixon's music as "alt-pop" and "indie pop". She is noted for her use of unorthodox instrumentation, such as mugs (which she would use as drum bases), pen pots (which she would use as tambourines), and saucepans; the introduction to "Swing!" was made by hitting a glass with a whisk, and the bassline in "Bounce" was made by twanging a ruler. She told Dork in July 2023 that she was "very inspired by early YouTube musicians like Walk Off the Earth, Dodie and Paint" and that she suffered from anxiety and attention deficit hyperactivity disorder. She became a member of Loud LDN, a collective of London-based women and non-binary artists set up in May 2022, that year.

== Discography ==
=== EPs ===
- Looking Forward (2016)
- Jungle (2017)
- Growing Pains (2018)
- Crikey! It's My Psyche (2022)
- In Case of Emergency (2023)
- Tales of a Knight (2025)

=== Singles ===
==== As lead artist ====
Singles as lead artist
Title	Year	Album	Ref.
"Pressure"	2019	Non-album single	
"Ugly"	2020	Non-album single	
"Space Out!"	2020	Crikey! It's My Psyche	
"New Waves" (with Austin Prince)	2020	Non-album single	
"Sucker"	2021	Crikey! It's My Psyche	
"Green Grass"	2021	Crikey! It's My Psyche	
"CEO of Watching Television"	2021	Crikey! It's My Psyche	
"Swing"	2022	In Case of Emergency	
"Big Lizard Energy"	2023	In Case of Emergency	
"Dopamine"	2023	In Case of Emergency	
"Bounce"	2023	In Case of Emergency	
"Renaissance"	2024	Tales of a Knight	
"Guts"	2025	Tales of a Knight	
"Guts (featuring piri)"	2025	Non-album single	
"Knight Shift"	2025	Tales of a Knight	
"Loose Change"	2025	Tales of a Knight	

==== As featured artist ====
Title	Year	Album	Ref.
"Take Over" (with Jinn)	2020	Non-album singles	
"Sugar Rush" (with Parsley Palette)	2020	Non-album singles	
"Devil Visits" (with Austin Prince and Ambrose Pierce)	2021	Non-album singles	
"Lush Life" (with DJ Airship)	2023	Non-album singles	
"Bumped in the Head" (with Charlieeeee)	2024	Dogbowl	

=== Remixes ===
Title	Year	Album	Ref.
"Wait (The Ellie Dixon Remix)" (with Gabrielle Papillon)	2021	Non-album single	

=== Other appearances ===
Title	Artist	Year	Album	Ref.
"If Only One of Us Can Wait"	Leo Howse	2020	What They Don't Teach You In Chess Club	
"Brainworks"	Claudia Kate	2021	A Damn Good Place to Start	
