= Porij =

English four-piece band

- Origin: Manchester, England
- Years active: 2019–present
- Labels: PIAS
- Members: Scout Moore; James Middleton; Jacob Maguire; Nathan Carroll
- Past members: Tommy Villiers; Tom Donaldson

Porij are an English four-piece band formed in Manchester in 2019 after meeting at the Royal Northern College of Music. At the time, the band consisted of Tommy Villiers, Tom Donaldson, James Middleton, and Scout Moore. Villiers and Donaldson later left and were replaced by guitarist Jacob Maguire and drummer Nathan Carroll. They have released the EPs Breakfast, Baby Face, and Outlines, before supporting Coldplay for four Manchester gigs of their Music of the Spheres World Tour in mid-2023. They released their debut album, Teething, in April 2024, which was received positively by DIY, The Line of Best Fit, NME, Dork, and Clash, but not The Guardian.

== Career ==
=== 2019–2022: Formation, Breakfast, and Baby Face ===
Porij was formed in early 2019 by four popular music students at the Royal Northern College of Music. The band's original members were vocalist and guitarist Tommy Villiers, drummer Tom Donaldson, bassist and keyboardist James Middleton, and vocalist and keyboardist Scout Moore. Moore, who uses the stage name Egg, suffers from fibromyalgia, grew up in Peckham, and was classically trained on the trumpet, before giving it up aged nineteen due to a wonky tooth. The four of them had just begun making primitive beats together when, with less than a week's notice, a friend asked if they could deputise for a gig in Leeds they could not make; though Middleton was out of the country at the time, the other three played the gig. The four of them formed a band shortly afterward, adopting their band name Porij as a misspelling of porridge, intended to evoke the way a five year old would spell it; their debut single was "I Like That".

In 2020, just before the second United Kingdom COVID-19 lockdown, Villiers matched on Tinder with Piri; a couple of weeks later, one of Porij's photographers retweeted one of their photo shoots, prompting her to find his Instagram account and ask him out. She later moved into Porij's student house in Whalley Range, Manchester, where three of the band lived. The band released the singles "150" and "Dirty Love", the latter in October 2020, and then the EP Breakfast the following month, which featured "I Like That"; said releases were released on Oat Gang Records, their own label, so called because DistroKid wanted a label name.

In April 2021, the band released the single "Nobody Scared", which Moore wrote after watching a documentary about Jack the Ripper and about the Reclaim the Night movement. In July, the band announced their EP Baby Face and released the single "Ego", about one participant in a failed relationship having moved on faster than the other. They then released "Can't Stop" in September, which Donaldson wrote about analysis paralysis, and then Baby Face later that month, which contained "Nobody Scared", "Ego", "Can't Stop", and two other tracks. In early 2022, Donaldson and Villiers left the band, the latter to concentrate on Piri & Tommy, and both were replaced by friends from university; Villiers was replaced by Jacob Maguire in March 2022, whose first day included a live session and a gig, while Nathan Carroll was recruited hours before the group were due to play at that year's BBC Radio 6 Music Festival, and formally replaced Donaldson after playing the gig.

=== 2022–present: Line-up changes, Outlines, and Teething ===
In February 2022, the band released "Figure Skating", a track about platonic intimacy, and the following April, they released "Lose Our Minds", a song about an inability to not resume a toxic relationship. In July, they released "Automatic", about early instances of feeling popular, and announced their EP Outlines, which they released in September 2022, and which contained "Figure Skating", "Lose Our Minds", "Automatic", and a title track. The band then released a remix of Metronomy's "Life and Death", which appeared on the November 2022 special edition of their album Small World, and in February 2023, they featured on Interplanetary Criminal's "Don't Hurt Me".

On 31 May and 1, 3, and 4 June 2023, Porij and Chvrches supported Coldplay during the Manchester legs of their Music of the Spheres World Tour, which took place at the City of Manchester Stadium, near a decrepit mill where Porij used to rehearse; Moore later used a DIY debate to note that Coldplay had sent the band "a bottle of bubbly", and described the experience as "good craic". They then released a remix of Antony Szmierek's "The Words to Auld Lang Syne", before releasing "You Should Know Me" in November 2023, their debut single on PIAS Recordings. They announced their debut album, the David Wrench-coproduced Teething, and released a single, "My Only Love", in January 2024; the album documented Villiers' and Carroll's replacement. A further single, "Unpredictable", was released in March 2024, and the following month, they released "Ghost".

Upon release on 26 April 2024, Teething was reviewed positively by the specialist music publications DIY, The Line of Best Fit, NME, Dork, and Clash, though Shaad D'Souza of The Guardian savaged its "neutered garage beats and platitudinal lyrics" and found the album's content to be "dance music so smooth and so inoffensive that [it would go] down a treat among the UK’s young, moneyed finance set". The band released "Stranger" in July, which featured the Welsh musician Elkka, and collaborated with Metronomy in September for "Petit Boy".

== Artistry ==
NME writer Hannah Mylrea described Breakfast as "a genre-splicing collection that flits between nu-jazz, house, funk and art-pop", while Kate Hutchinson of The Guardian described Porij's sound as a combination of "house, garage, new wave and lo-fi pop". The single "Dirty Love" she described as having "all Georgia-style electro and a rough style that roots them in the world of Micachu", in that, at the time, every member recorded their instruments in their bedroom. Robin Murray of Clash noted that "Figure Skating" "leans on late 90s drum 'n' bass", Alexis Petridis described Porij in April 2022 as an "indie" band "dabbling in drum'n'bass", and Rolling Stone described the band in March 2024 as alt-pop "with toes dipped into rave culture, straight-up indie, pure pop, UK garage and beyond". In an interview with NME in November 2020, the band cited Little Dragon, Louis Cole, and MJ Cole as influences, and after being asked in a May 2021 interview with DIY which peers they were taking inspiration from, Middleton, Villiers, Moore, and Donaldson individually cited Petsematary, Coco Bryce, Paige Kennedy, and Enny as influences.
