= Lucy Tun =

- Born: London, England
- Genre: Alt pop
- Occupations: Singer; songwriter; musician; record producer
- Instruments: Vocals; sampler; keyboards
- Years active: 2018–present
- Member of: ESEA Music; Loud LDN

Lucy Tun is an English singer-songwriter and musician. Born in North West London, she released her first long-play, Good Nights Bad Stories, as LCYTN in 2018, after which she took a break from making music. After being recognised on a family trip to Myanmar, she released the beat tape Bad Weather, Vol. 1 in 2019 and the three-track EP Every Thursday Night / Spotlight in 2020, both under the name LCYTN. She began releasing music under her own name in 2021, reserving LCYTN for DJ sets, and released the EP Unreal in 2023. She joined Loud LDN in 2022 and is also a member of ESEA Music, with whom she released a single in 2023.

== Life and career ==
Tun grew up in North West London, and has an older brother, Daniel; their parents are of Myanma descent. As a child, she listened to classical music; when she was a teenager, she became interested in video games, and would listen to J-pop and K-pop. When she was sixteen, she became interested in pop music, and became obsessed with Adele. She studied economics with Burmese at SOAS University of London; in 2018, during her first year, she released her first long-play, Good Nights Bad Stories, as LCYTN, a disemvoweled form of her own name. She then promised her parents that she would quit music; on a family trip to Myanmar, they discovered that she had not done so after fans of hers approached her in the street after recognising her from billboards. In 2019, she released "Ride", which featured Daniel on guitar, and Bad Weather, Vol. 1, a beat tape. In July 2020, she released "Every Thursday Night", from her three-track EP Every Thursday Night / Spotlight; "Spotlight" featured Osquello and Yiigaa.

She then began releasing music under her own name, reserving LCYTN for DJ sets. In July 2021, she released "Monarchy", a kawaii drill song written in August 2020 about people who adopt personas on dates; she wrote the song with Jakwob, and in the last twenty minutes of a recording session, having spent the rest of it working on another song. The following month, she and Ric Wilson featured on "Let Me Ride", a UK garage song by Bone Slim of the Nine8 Collective; she then appeared on a remix of Yiigaa's "Up", which also featured Eliza Legzdina. In March 2022, she released "314", which she wrote the day after moving out of the house she and strangers spent lockdown living in, and about saying goodbye to her former housemates. The following May, she released "Another Week", which she wrote while depressed following a breakup in lockdown; the song was produced by Usher Lavelle, and featured double handclaps.

Tun joined Loud LDN, a collective of women and genderqueer musicians set up in May 2022, that year. In January 2023, she released "Kulture Klub", a song about feeling like an outsider, which she wrote with producer J. Ar J, and after attending Paris Fashion Week; the song referenced Bella Hadid, prompting her to shout out the single on TikTok, on which the song later went viral. In June 2023, she released "ADHD", a song named after the neurodevelopmental disorder she suffered from and which mentioned Norwegian Wood and flying to Norway. That August, she released "Rabbit Hole", on which Daniel played guitar, and announced that she would release the EP Unreal in October 2023.

In September 2023, for East and South East Asian Heritage Month, Tun and Kityiu Grace organised a series of writing camps for ESEA Music, a collective of UK-based East and Southeast Asian music industry professionals and artists including Rina Sawayama, Yunè Pinku, Andrew Hung, Matt Tong, and Sarah Bonito. One of these camps produced "I Luv My Life", which was produced by Congee, featured him, Tun, Congee, Iamkyami, Jason Kwan, Josie Man, Tascha Jerawan, and Vishal Chopra, and was released in October 2023. Later that month, she instead released "Airport Smoking Room", a song inspired by The Terminal and about unspoken bonds. In November 2023, she released the single "Diary" and then Unreal, which featured "Kulture Klub", "ADHD", "Rabbit Hole", and "Diary". In December 2023, she and fellow Loud LDNers Charlotte Plank, Caity Baser, and Venbee appeared on Dork's 2024 Hype List. In July 2024, she released "Come To My House", a nod to the similarly named Queen Latifah song "Come Into My House". The track was later remixed by Piri & Tommy.

== Artistry ==
Tun's music videos regularly feature the fictitious drug "Inphanta-C" to signal the transition between fantasy and reality, which she uses as a metaphor for the façade people put up while online. In December 2023, Martyn Young of Dork described LCYTN's works as alternative electronic music and Tun's works as alt-pop. While reviewing a March 2024 set at The Old Blue Last in London, Mark Kelly of Brighton & Hove News described her set as "broadly" a mix of R&B and K-pop. "Come To My House" was a house music song, expressly produced as something fun and lighthearted.

Tun was first inspired to make music by the internet, having found it a safe space to upload music without judgement. She later used a June 2023 interview with Gauchoworld to cite inspiration from SZA, finding the autobiographical songwriting style in her 2017 album Ctrl inspirational for her own music, as well as RuPaul's Drag Race, having been introduced to it at university and having found it an "eye-opener", having grown up inhabiting conservative spaces, and found its message to "be yourself" helpful. For Unreal, she cited Björk's Post as an influence. Other influences include anime and death metal; she told Clash in January 2021 that she had got into the genre after watching videos from Hellfest, and that she had been fascinated by its aggressive amelodic energy.
