= Fluxblog =

Fluxblog is an MP3 blog created and updated by Matthew Perpetua, music editor of BuzzFeed and contributing writer to Pitchfork, Slate, Vulture, Rolling Stone and MTV.

== History ==
The blog began in 2002 and began to host MP3s at the end of that year. Two MP3s are commonly posted every weekday along with descriptions and links to artists' websites or places where an album or single can be purchased.

Media sources have cited Fluxblog as a key influence in the founding and development of MP3 blogging. According to Rolling Stone, "almost all of the MP3 blogs trace their roots to Fluxblog", and an article in The Guardian stated that Fluxblog "is acknowledged as a pioneer of MP3 blogging." Fluxblog was reviewed positively in The New York Times. In 2006, Entertainment Weekly named Fluxblog the tenth best website for discovering new music.
