= Piri & Tommy =

2021–2026 English musical duo

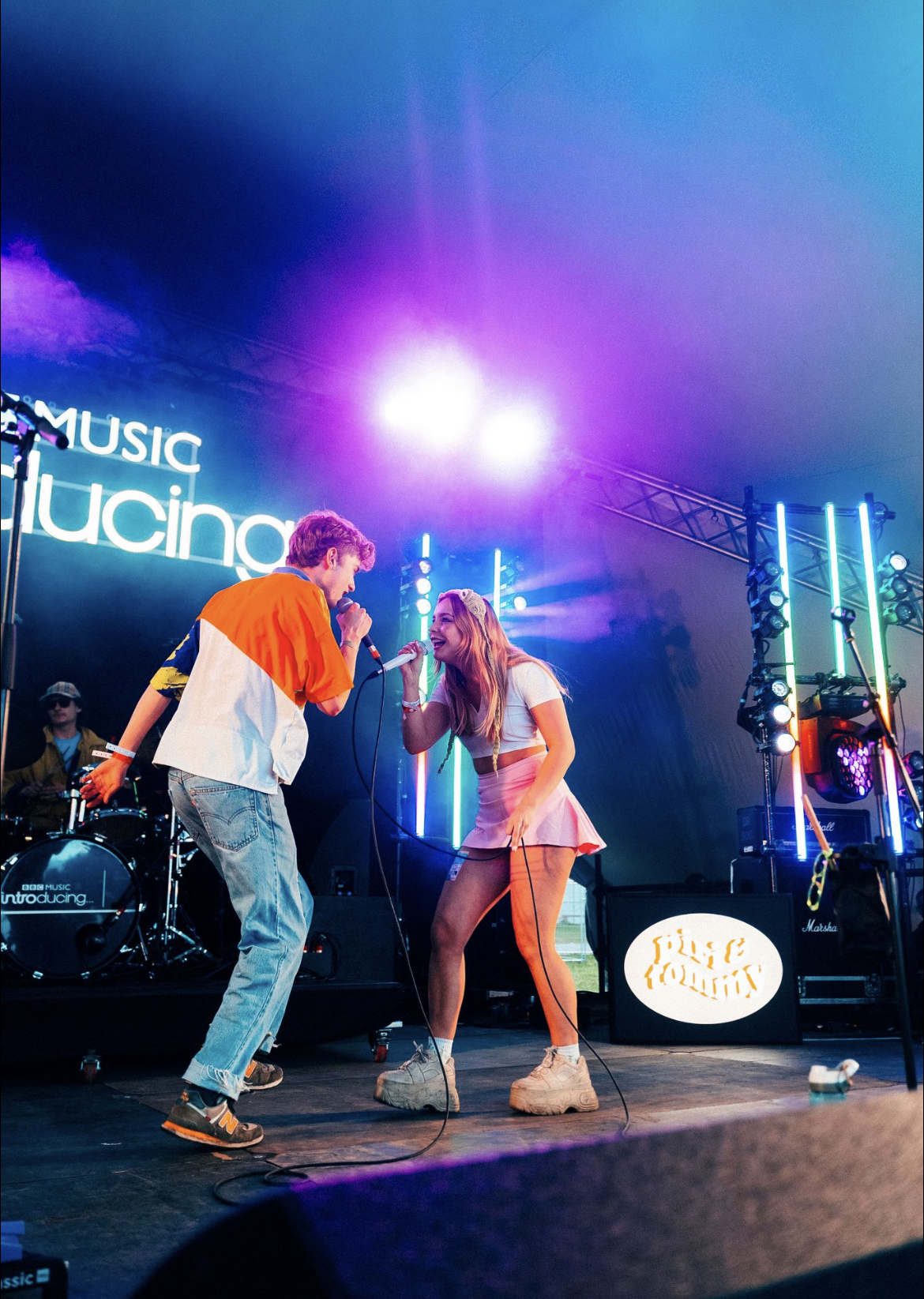
- Piri & Tommy in 2023

Background information
- Origin: Manchester, England
- Genres: Drum and bass; pop; electropop; dance-pop
- Years active: 2021–2026
- Label: Polydor
- Members: Sophie "Piri" McBurnie; Tommy Villiers
- Website: piriandtommy.com

Piri & Tommy were an English drum and bass duo, formed in 2021. The group were formed of Sophie "Piri" McBurnie and Tommy Villiers. The pair charted at number 99 on the UK Singles Chart with their single "On & On". They released their debut mixtape froge.mp3 in October 2022.

McBurnie and Villiers first met in 2020 through Instagram when McBurnie found Villiers' account, messaged him, and they later started dating. The two shared a love for dance artists like Disclosure and Kaytranada which led to them making music together. He produced Piri's first two singles "It's a Match" and "Soft Spot", the latter of which received over 18 million streams on Spotify. They later released the singles "Beachin" and "On & On". "Soft Spot", "Beachin", and "On & On" appeared on their debut mixtape froge.mp3, which they released in October 2022. They performed at the 2022 Reading Festival, and were later signed to Polydor Records. In November 2022, Piri & Tommy released a cover version of Charli XCX's song "Unlock It", which became popular on TikTok with an accompanying dance. Piri & Tommy were also announced to be a nominee of BBC Radio 1's Sound of 2023 in December 2022, along with other artists like Dylan, Cat Burns and Flo. In January 2023, McBurnie announced via TikTok that she and Villiers had split up. The split received coverage from Capital Dance, with Piri stating in another video that the two will still make music together. The pair continued as a band until January 2026.

Critics categorised the band's music as drum and bass, pop, and dance. In September 2021, McBurnie stated that she grew up with artists such as the Arctic Monkeys but was currently inspired by Disclosure, MJ Cole and PinkPantheress and Villiers listed Red Hot Chili Peppers, The Meters, Ed Rush and Lemon Jelly as some artists he grew up listening to but was taking current inspiration from Disclosure and Kaytranada.

== Discography ==
=== Mixtapes ===
- Froge.mp3 (2022)

=== EPs ===
- About Dancing (2024)
- Lucky Disc (2025)
- Magic! (2025)

=== Singles ===
List of singles
| Title | Year | Album |
|---|---|---|
| "Soft Spot" | 2021 | froge.mp3 |
| "Beachin" | 2022 | froge.mp3 |
| "Words" | 2022 | froge.mp3 |
| "On & On" | 2022 | froge.mp3 |
| "Unlock It" | 2022 | Non-album singles |
| "Updown" | 2023 | Non-album singles |
| "Nice 2 Me" | 2023 | Non-album singles |
| "Lovergirl" | 2023 | Non-album singles |
| "Bluetooth" | 2023 | Non-album singles |
| "Christmas Time" | 2023 | Non-album singles |
| "99%" | 2024 | about dancing |
| "Dog" | 2024 | about dancing |
| "Lemons" | 2025 | Lucky Disc |
| "Fruit Machine" | 2025 | Lucky Disc |
| "Lights Off" / "Bullet" | 2025 | Lucky Disc |
| "Someone" | 2025 | Magic! |
| "Miss Provocative" | 2025 | Magic! |

=== Writing and remix credits ===
| Song | Year | Artist | Co-writers | Album | Ref. |
|---|---|---|---|---|---|
| "Morning Blues" | 2023 | Emzo | Emilion Buckz, Sophie McBurnie, Tommy Villiers | Non-album singles | |
| "Come to My House" (Piri & Tommy remix) | 2024 | Lucy Tun | Lucy Tun, Tommy Villiers, Jackson Homer | Non-album singles | |
