= Loud LDN =

British musical collective

- Origin: London, England
- Years active: 2022–present
- Website: Instagram

Loud LDN is a British collective of female and gender-expansive artists based in London. Formed in May 2022 by Coupdekat and Maisi as a WhatsApp group chat called Ladies Making Noise in London, the chat started off with ten members including Piri and Matilda Cole and later added Caity Baser, Venbee, Issey Cross, Charlotte Plank, and Bshp. The chat expanded into its own Instagram page and eventually into its own events before moving to Discord. One UK Singles Chart in 2023 featured five entries from Loud LDN members.

== History ==
Loud LDN is a women-run collective of women and gender-expansive artists based in London. It was founded in May 2022 by musicians Coupdekat and Maisi; Maisi came across one of Coupdekat's songs on TikTok and invited her for brunch, where they discussed the loneliness of being a woman in the music industry and how they were often pitted against each other. This prompted them to set up a group chat on WhatsApp called Ladies Making Noise in London for the women and non-binary musicians they knew at that time.

"Our most important thing when we were starting out was to not treat it as a networking thing – we’re there to support each other but not to use each other. Of course collaboration is natural, but we wanted it to feel like a sisterhood outside of the pressures and expectations of the industry, and that still is at the heart of everything we do."

— Matilda Cole speaking to Wonderland Magazine in August 2024

Initially, the group chat started with ten musicians including Piri, who Maisi had reached out to at the start of 2022, and Matilda Cole, who had bonded with Coupdekat over a lack of community in the music industry. The adding of other members caused the member list to grow to forty people, prompting them to set up an Instagram page. In November 2022, Venbee mentioned that she was in the group chat in an NME article; this caused interest in the group chat to rise to the extent that the collective had to institute eligibility requirements and an application process. By June 2023, the chat had moved to Discord.

In November 2022, they held an event at The Bunker in Deptford Broadway. Charlotte Plank, who helped organise the event, used a December 2022 NME article to note that it had been "create[d as] a safe space where women can go and relax [without] hav[ing] to worry about getting groped or touched up". Several members performed at a three-day pop-up event in April 2023 hosted by Spotify's Our Generation in Shoreditch before others performed at Reign Down at Southbank Centre in June 2023 as part of Meltdown Festival. The month after that, members performed at Climate Live's set at Wireless Festival.

== Artistry ==
Coupdekat told an interview with La Face B in January 2023 that she had been inspired by Nine8, a group composed of Lava La Rue, Mac Wetha, Bone Slim, Biig Piig, Nayana Iz, Nige and LorenzoRSV, and Maisi stated in April 2023 that they picked the name Loud LDN on the grounds that "[they] want to be loud in the industry, [they] want to like, make [their] mark, [they] want everyone to hear [them]". In December 2022, Sophie Wilson of NME described the collective as a "community of [...] drum 'n' bass, pop, and R&B artists at all stages in their careers"; the following month, however, Maisi stated in an interview with Mia Khan of Shift London that she had complained to the magazine about the description on the grounds that there were only a few drum and bass artists in the group and that most of its members made indie and pop music, with the occasional jazz musician in there.

== Selected members ==
- Abbie Ozard
- Alessi Rose
- April Lawlor
- Beth McCarthy
- Bshp
- Caity Baser
- Cat Rose Smith
- Charlieeeee
- Charlotte Haining
- Charlotte Plank
- Clara Bach
- Coupdekat
- DellaXOZ
- Driia
- Ellie Dixon
- Eliza Legzdina
- Erin LeCount
- Emma Bradley
- Evi Giorgi
- FranQi
- Georgia Twinn
- Hannah Grae
- Issey Cross
- Izzi De-Rosa
- Jangs
- Josie Man
- Laurel Smith
- Lucy Tun
- Maisi
- Matilda Cole
- Molly Burman
- Nieve Ella
- Nonô
- Nova May
- Nxdia
- Parthenope
- Piri
- Rachel Newnham
- Sofy
- Sophie and the Giants
- Spider
- Szou
- Tapwaterlucy
- Venbee
- Willow Kayne

== Selected discography ==
Singles by Piri (as half of Piri & Tommy), Caity Baser, Venbee, Issey Cross, Charlotte Plank, and Bshp have entered the UK Singles Chart; the chart ending 4 May 2023 contained five entries from members: Venbee's "Messy in Heaven", Cross' and Bshp's "Oh Baby", Baser's "Pretty Boys" and "Feels This Good", and Plank's "Dancing Is Healing".

List of UK Singles Chart entries
Title	Year	Peak	Artist
"X&Y"	2022	77	Caity Baser
"Messy in Heaven"	2022	3	Venbee featuring Goddard.
"On & On"	2022	99	Piri & Tommy
"Oh My"	2023	98	Luude and Issey Cross featuring Moby
"Oh Baby"	2023	35	Nathan Dawe and Bru-C featuring Bshp and Issey Cross
"Pretty Boys"	2023	26	Caity Baser
"Feels This Good"	2023	93	Sigala featuring Caity Baser, Mae Muller and Stefflon Don
"Gutter"	2023	95	Venbee
"Dancing Is Healing"	2023	5	Rudimental featuring Charlotte Plank and Vibe Chemistry
"Dance Around It"	2023	61	Joel Corry and Caity Baser
"Die Young"	2023	73	Venbee & Rudimental
"Rave Out"	2023	37	Turno, Skepsis, and Charlotte Plank
"Bittersweet Goodbye"	2023	19	Issey Cross
"No Man's Land"	2024	61	Marshmello & Venbee
"Green & Gold"	2024	29	Rudimental, Skepsis, Charlotte Plank & Riko Dan
