= Brighton Pride =

English annual LGBTQ+ event

Brighton & Hove Pride
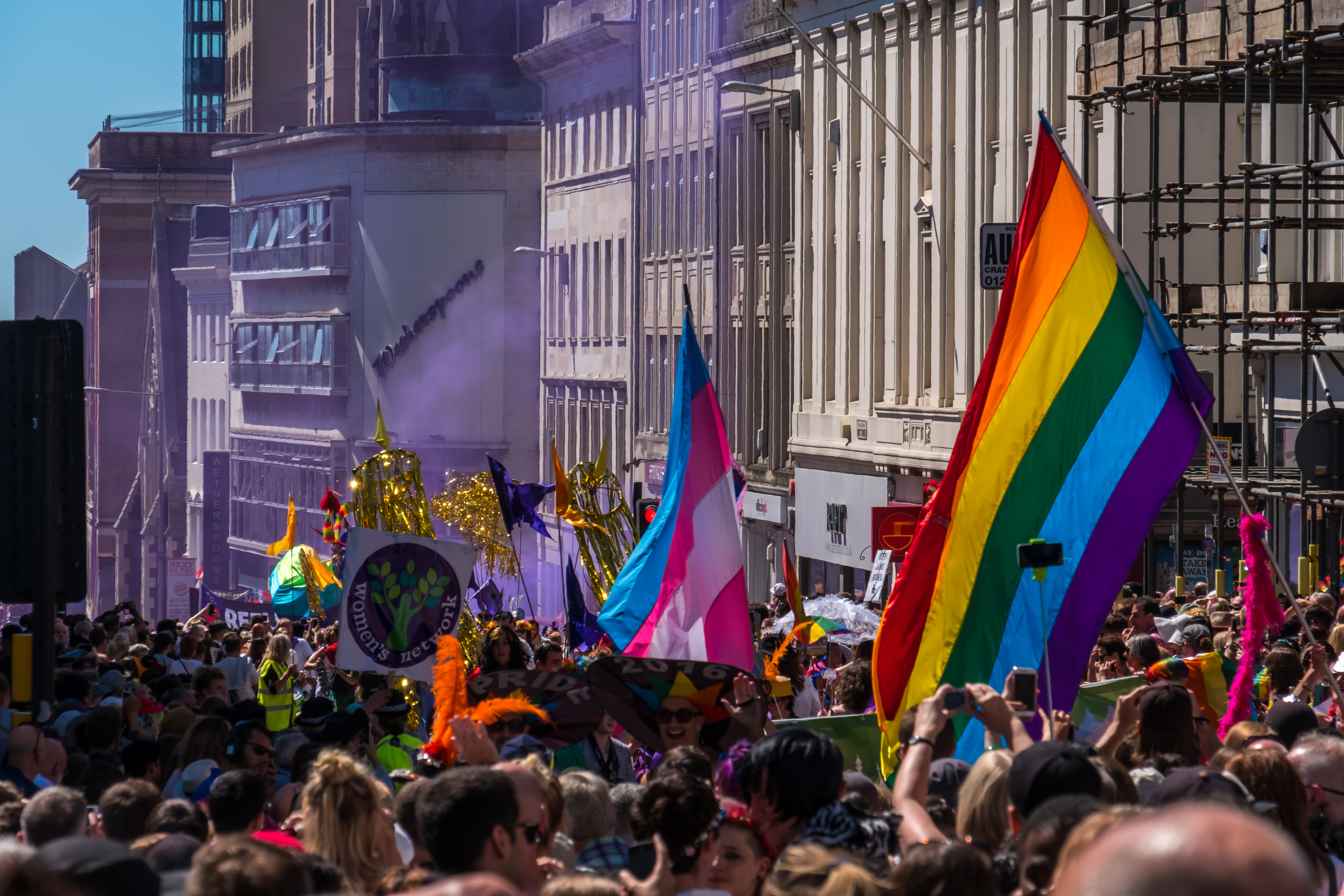
- Crowds at Brighton Pride in 2016
- Frequency: Annually
- Locations: Brighton, England
- Years active: 1972–present
- Founded: 1972; 54 years ago
- Founders: Sussex Gay Liberation Front
- Most recent: 1 August 2026 – 2 August 2026
- Next event: 31 July 2027 – 1 August 2027
- Attendance: 500,000
- Website: https://www.brighton-pride.org/

Brighton and Hove Pride is an annual LGBT pride event held in the city of Brighton and Hove, England, organised by Brighton Pride, a community interest company (CIC) which promotes equality and diversity, and advances education to eliminate discrimination against the lesbian, gay, bisexual and trans (LGBTQ) community.

The major event is an annual summer festival held in the first week of August, which usually consists of a parade through the city centre, a festival event in Preston Park, the Gay Village party and other club parties. Since 2013, it has also included an arts and film festival and a Pride dog show.

Pride attracts an estimated 500,000 people to the city over the Pride weekend across the Pride parade, Pride in the Park festival, and related events. Pride brings 2% of the city's annual visitors in one day and an estimated £30.5 million to the city's economy, credited as one of the main ways Brighton has boosted its economy from tourism.

== History ==
Brighton and Hove Pride began with a gay demonstration in Brighton in October 1972 by The Sussex Gay Liberation Front (SGLF) and a full pride march in July 1973.

Pride returned to the city in 1991 when Brighton Area Action Against Section 28 organised the first contemporary Pride - a weekend of events which brought hundreds to the streets. After a shaky start with a large event in 1992, followed by bankruptcy of the organising committee and a much more low-key series of events in 1993, the festival began to increase significantly in size in future years, eventually attracting the support of sponsors, pubs, clubs and drag artists. Since 1996, the park festival has been based at Preston Park.

Pride events have traditionally been an environment for celebrating the diversity of the lesbian and gay community. In 2002 Pride in Brighton & Hove agreed to explicitly include and reference the trans community making that year's Pride for the first time an LGBT event. A web site was created in 2002 called GenderDiversity.org with the original proposal to put the T in LGB, an information sheet, and photos of trans people celebrating the first LGBT Brighton Pride in 2002.

In 2004, Brighton Pride became a charity, to develop the event, to advance public education – by raising awareness of issues affecting LGBT people, and to make grants and donations to other charitable and voluntary organisations in the area. In 2011, organisers controversially introduced an entry fee to the park festival, as the company was in financial ruin and ran up over £200,000 in debt. Since 2012, Pride has been under new management and has raised over £922,000 for local LGBT community groups over the past six years. The theme of the event in 2019 was Generations of Love, which commemorated the 50th anniversary of the Stonewall riots in the US, seen as a watershed moment for gay rights and the starting point for the Pride movement.

In 2020, the 30th anniversary Pride was postponed due to the COVID-19 pandemic, however a programme of online streamed events took place during the weekend. On 5 May 2021, it was announced that Pride 2021 that had been anticipated to go ahead in a reduced form had been cancelled due to uncertainty over pandemic restrictions.

In 2022 Pride returned to celebrate 30 years of Pride with the parade, street party and the festival in Preston Park headlined by Christina Aguilera and Paloma Faith.

== Pride festival ==
The weekend includes:

- The traditional community parade with floats, starting from the seafront via London Road to the park
- Fabuloso festival in Preston Park with headlining acts
- The Pride Village party (PVP) in Kemp Town and the seafront
- Several club parties around the city including Pleasure Gardens in Old Steine
- An arts and film festival
- A dog show

== Headliners ==
Below is a list of artists who have headlined, or are planned to headline, on the main stage at Brighton Pride.

Year	Date	Headliner(s)	Other Main Stage Artists	Notes
2012	Saturday 1 September	Alexandra Burke	Freemasons, Fatboy Slim	
2013	Saturday 3 August	Paloma Faith	Alison Moyet, MKS (Sugababes), Stooshe, Ms Dynamite	
2014	Saturday 2 August	Blue	Collabro, Heather Peace, Neon Jungle, Kimberly Wyatt, Katy B, Sam Bailey	
2015	Saturday 1 August	The Human League	Bright Light Bright Light, Ella Henderson, Fatboy Slim, Foxes, Kelli-Leigh, Ms Dynamite, Tulisa	
2016	Saturday 6 August	Sister Sledge	Carly Rae Jepsen, Anne-Marie, Alesha Dixon, DJ Fresh, Dua Lipa, Fleur East, Imani Williams, Seann Miley Moore	
2017	Saturday 5 August	Pet Shop Boys	Years & Years, Becky Hill, Fickle Friends, KStewart, Louisa Johnson, M.O	
2018	Saturday 4 August	Britney Spears	Ella Eyre, Pixie Lott, Louise Redknapp, MNEK, Mabel	
2018	Sunday 5 August	Jess Glynne	Nile Rodgers & Chic, RAYE, Gabrielle, House Gospel Choir	
2019	Saturday 3 August	Kylie Minogue	Clean Bandit (with Marina), Fleur East, Björn Again, Zak Abel, Rina Sawayama, Alice Chater, Emeli Sandé	
2019	Sunday 4 August	Jessie J Grace Jones	Rak-Su, Nina Nesbitt, House Gospel Choir, Grace Carter	
2020	Saturday 1 August	Mariah Carey	Bananarama	Cancelled due to COVID-19
2020	Sunday 2 August	The Pussycat Dolls	Todrick Hall	Cancelled due to COVID-19
2021	Saturday 7 August	N/A	N/A	Cancelled due to COVID-19
2021	Sunday 8 August	N/A	N/A	Cancelled due to COVID-19
2022	Saturday 6 August	Christina Aguilera	Tia Kofi, Call Me Loop, L Devine, Bimini Bon-Boulash, RAYE, Todrick Hall, Ella Henderson	
2022	Sunday 7 August	Paloma Faith	Lyra, Cat Burns, Björn Again, Sophie Ellis-Bextor, Jake Shears	
2023	Saturday 5 August	Black Eyed Peas	Zara Larsson, Jax Jones, Dylan, Mae Muller, Bellah Mae	
2023	Sunday 6 August	Steps	Melanie C, Louise Redknapp, B*Witched, The Vivienne, Harley Moon Kemp	
2024	Saturday 3 August	Girls Aloud	Billy Porter, Sophie Ellis-Bextor, House Gospel Choir, Beth McCarthy	
2024	Sunday 4 August	Mika	S Club, Gabrielle, Björn Again, Danny Beard	
2025	Saturday 2 August	Mariah Carey	Sister Sledge, Loreen, Confidence Man, Ashnikko, Slayyyter, Absnt Mind	Dance Stage: Bimini Bon-Boulash, Katy B
2025	Sunday 3 August	Sugababes	Andy Bell, Ultra Nate, Beth Ditto, Sonique, Natalie Imbruglia, Will Young, Nxdia, Rhys' Pieces, Fred Roberts, Lyvia	Dance Stage: Fatboy Slim, Eliza Rose
2026	Saturday 1 August	RAYE	RuPaul, Jessie J, Self Esteem, Leigh-Anne	Dance Stage: Bimini Bon-Boulash, Purple Disco Machine
2026	Sunday 2 August	Diana Ross	Five, Paris Hilton, Melanie C, Holly Johnson, Caity Baser	Dance Stage: Armand Van Helden

== Gallery ==
2011 – Brighton Pride parade near Brighton Palace Pier

2011 – Terrence Higgins Trust HIV-testing campaign

2011 – Bus displaying a MindOut BlackOut banner

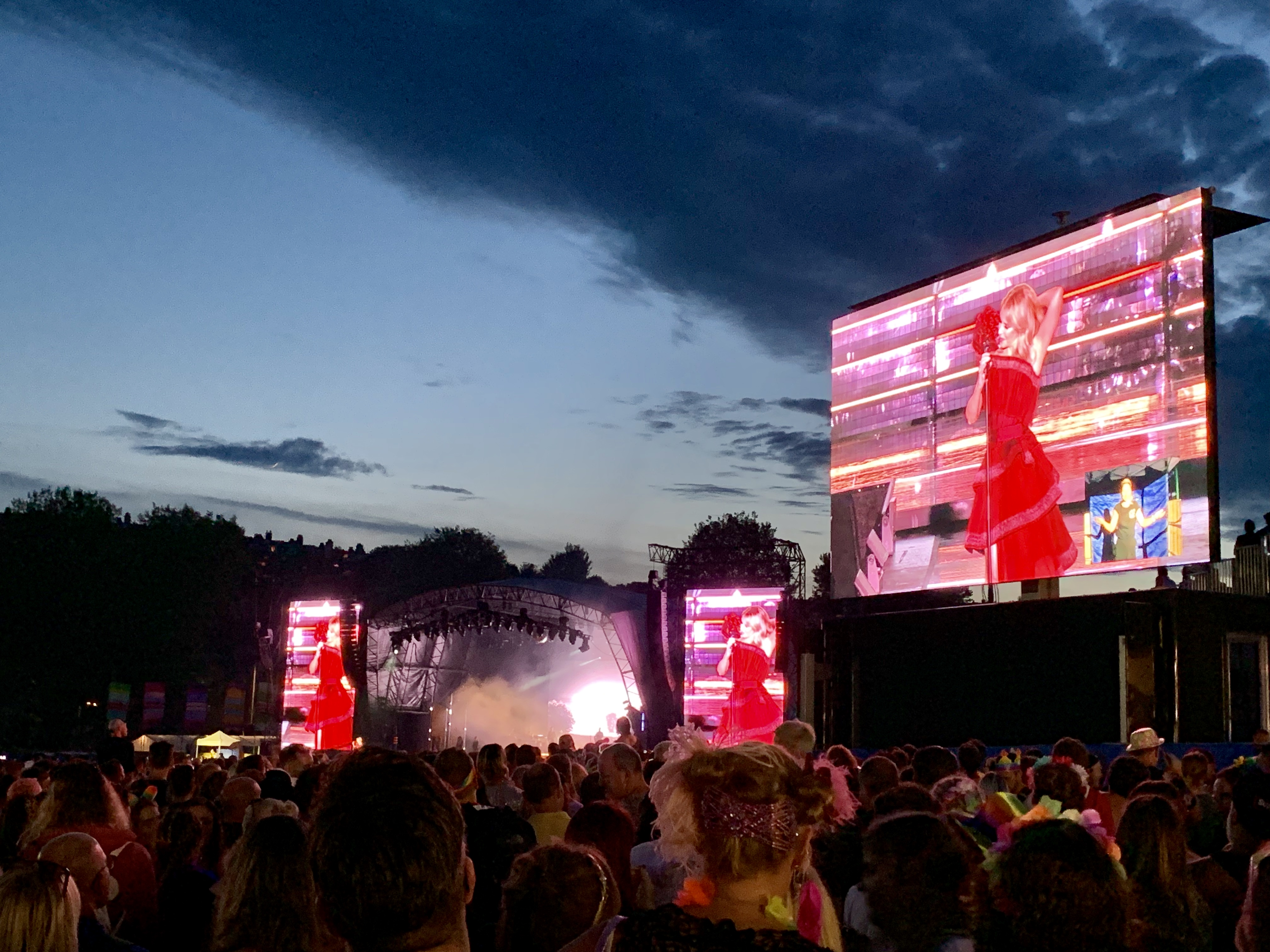
2019 - Kylie Minogue headlining Brighton Pride

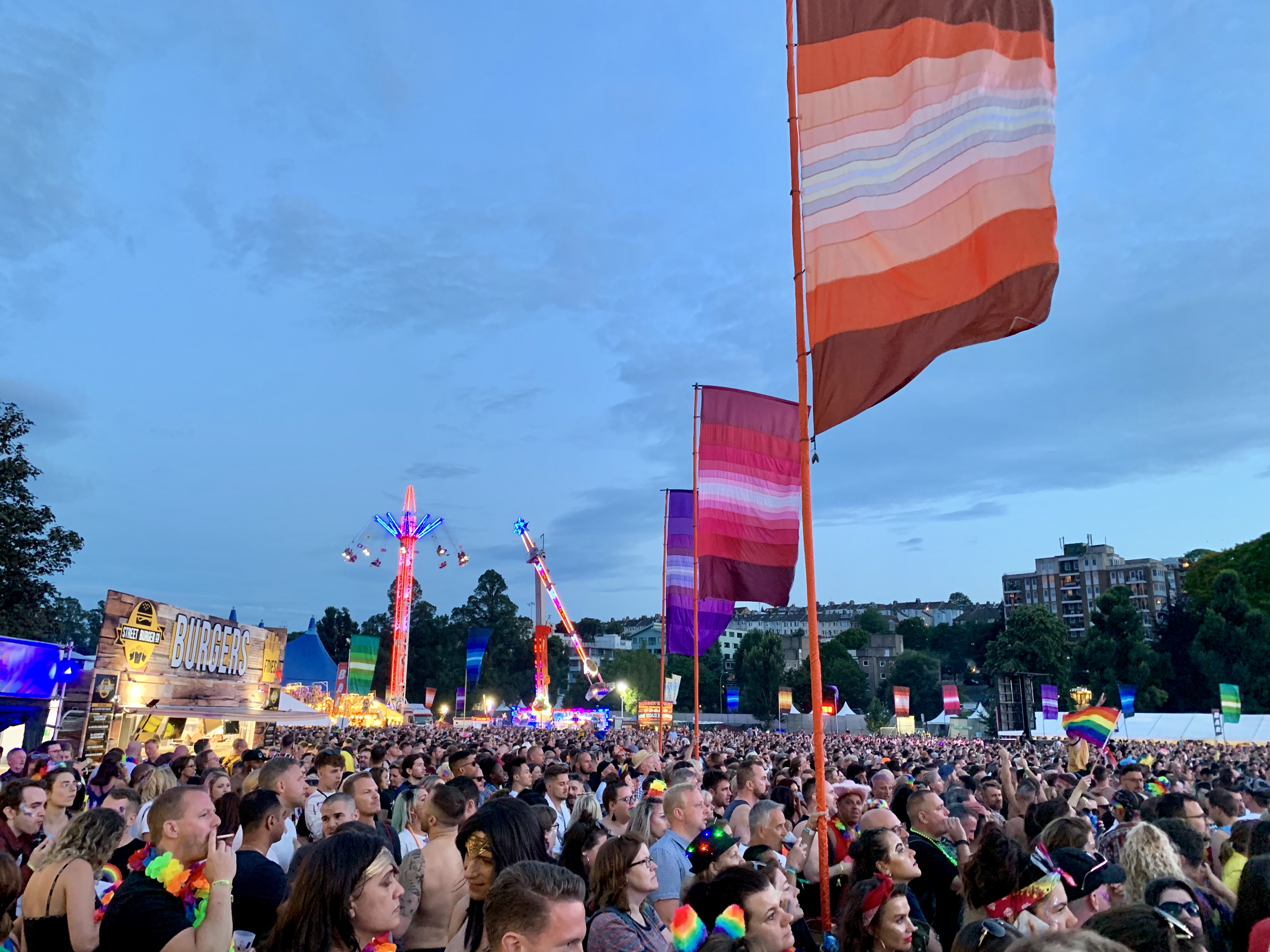
2019 - Crowd during the Pride in the Park event at Brighton Pride

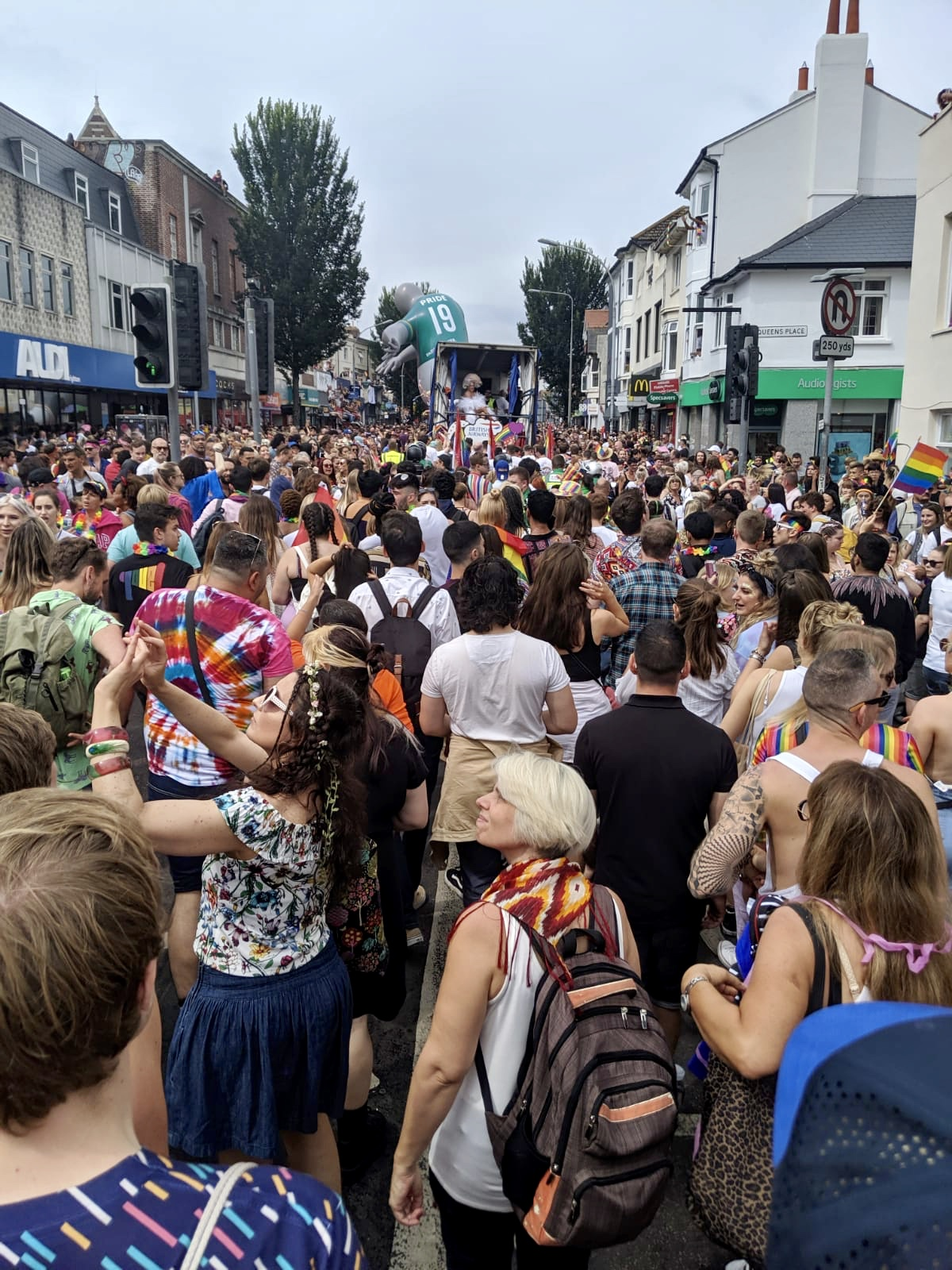
2019 - Crowds at Brighton Pride

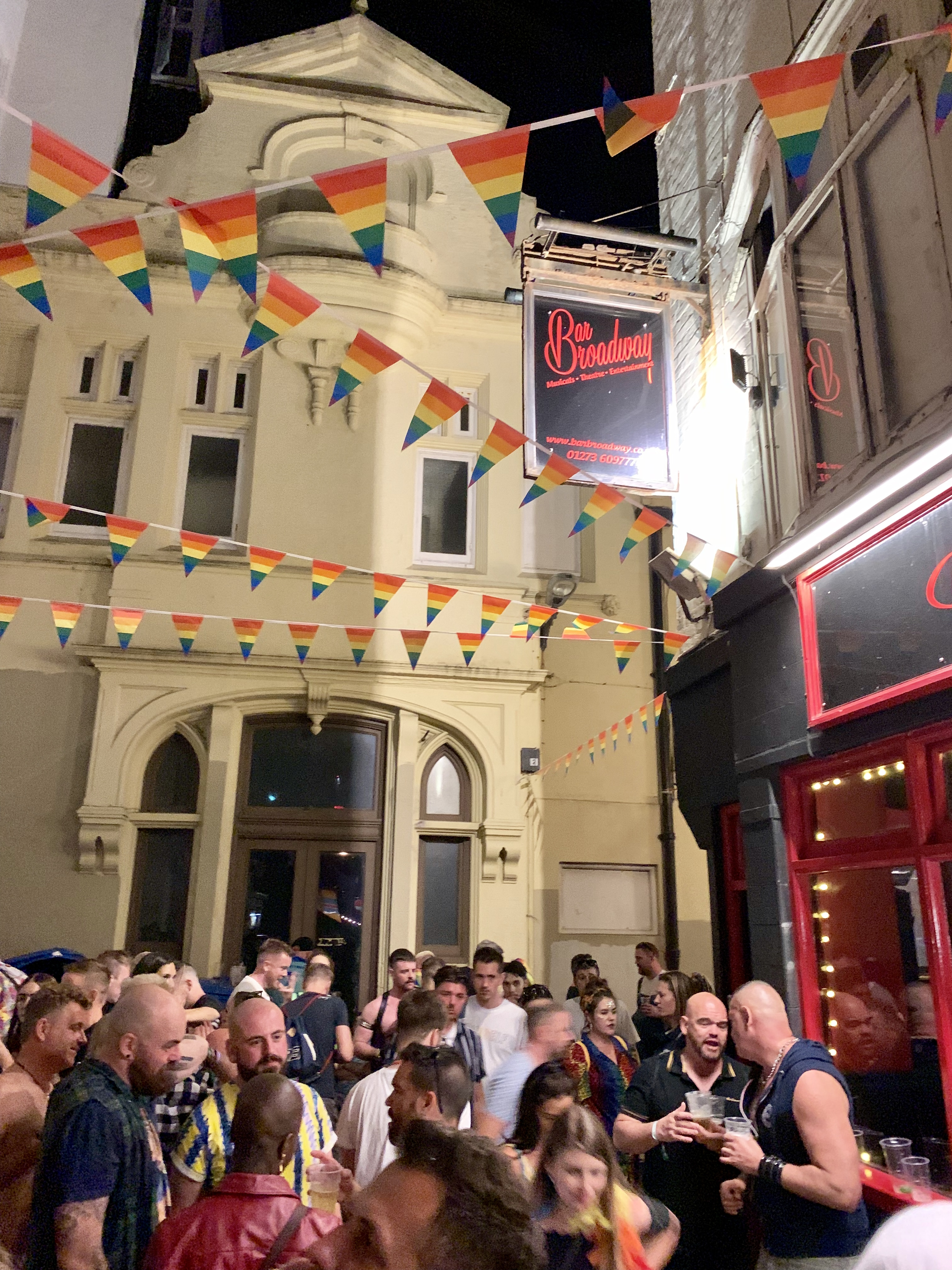
2019 - Crowds outside Bar Broadway at Brighton Pride

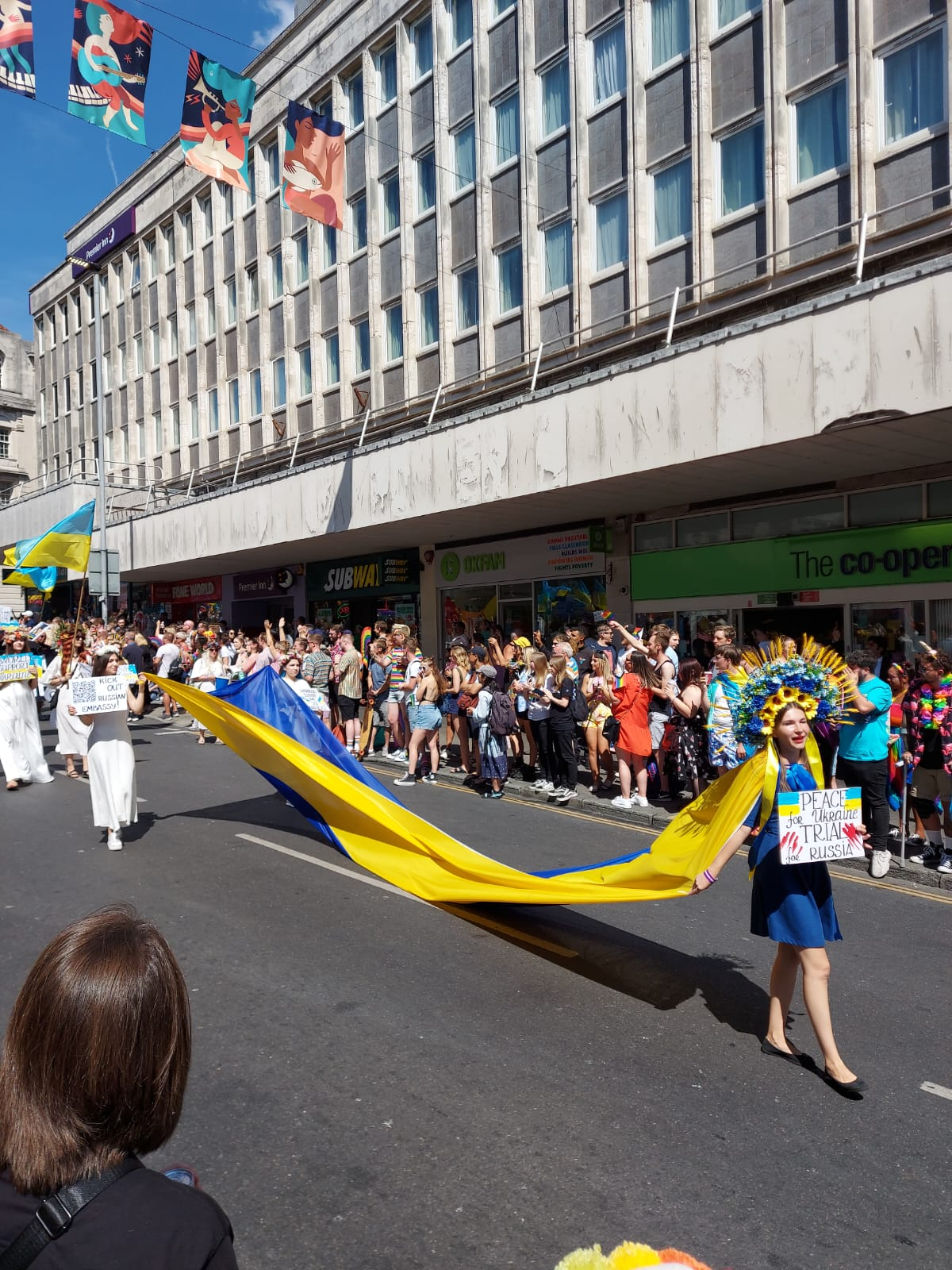
2022 - Ukraine attendees at Brighton Pride

== See also ==
- Kemptown, Brighton
- Gay Liberation Front
- LGBT community of Brighton and Hove
- Trans Pride Brighton
