= Nigel Cole =

English film and television director

- Born: 1959 (age 65–66); Launceston, Cornwall, England
- Occupation(s): Film and television director
- Partner: Kate Isitt
- Children: 2

Nigel Cole (born 1959) is an English film and television director.

== Career ==
Cole began his career in the 1980s, directing current affairs shows and documentaries for Central Independent Television. Into the 1990s, Cole co-wrote the play Sod with Arthur Smith, which he also directed and presented at the Pleasance during the 1993 Edinburgh Festival. Cole has also directed episodes of Peak Practice and Cold Feet for television. He also directed many episodes of the British television show Doc Martin, including four in the last season (2022). He has also directed Saving Grace, Calendar Girls and A Lot Like Love for cinema.

Saving Grace won the World Cinema Audience Award at the 2000 Sundance Film Festival and gained him a nomination for Best Director at that year's British Independent Film Awards. Made in Dagenham received a BAFTA nomination as Best British Film and a nomination for the Satellite Award for Best Film – Musical or Comedy.

In 2014, he directed three episodes of the drama series Last Tango in Halifax, which aired in December 2014 and January 2015.

== Personal life ==
Cole and actress Kate Isitt have two children, including Matilda Cole, a member of Loud LDN, who has appeared in her father's productions Made in Dagenham and The Wedding Video.

== Filmography ==
- Saving Grace (2000)
- Calendar Girls (2003)
- A Lot Like Love (2005)
- Five Dollars a Day (2008)
- Made in Dagenham (2010)
- The Wedding Video (2012)
- All in Good Time (2012)
- Do Not Disturb (2016)
- Wham!: Last Christmas Unwrapped (2024)
