= Matilda Cole =

English musician and actress

- Born: Matilda Clementine Isitt Cole; Brighton, England
- Genres: Indie pop
- Occupation: Musician
- Member of: Loud LDN

Matilda Clementine Isitt Cole is an English musician and actress. Born in Sussex, she is the daughter of film director Nigel Cole and the actress Kate Isitt and appeared in several of the former's works in the 2010s. In 2020, she signed a record deal and released the EPs Milk Teeth, The High Dive, and Pomegranate and multiple singles including a cover version of The Weeknd's "The Hills". She is an original member of Loud LDN and makes indie-pop music.

== Life and career ==
=== Early life and film career ===
Matilda Clementine Isitt Cole was born in Sussex, though spent periods living in Los Angeles and Camden Town before moving to Brighton. Her mother is Kate Isitt, an actress, and her father is Nigel Cole, a film director who played guitar and would buy egg-shaped shakers for her to play along with him. She later attended Dharma Primary School. In 2010, she played Emily in Made in Dagenham, and in 2012 she played a bridesmaid in The Wedding Video, both of which were directed by her father; she later played Madeleine in his 2019 film short Wisteria Cottage.

=== Music career ===
She realised she wanted to be a full-time musician aged seven after seeing Miley Cyrus perform at the O2 Arena, and wrote her first song in the car journey back to her hotel; she later created a YouTube account called "matilda cole vevo". Aged sixteen, after putting a cover on SoundCloud, she was messaged by a London-based talent manager, who took her on as a client, and in March 2020, she withdrew from her A-levels four months early, and signed a record deal. In November 2020, she released "The Clouds", a song about her teenage friendships and relationships for which a music video was directed by Amy Becker-Burnett, and then the following January, she released "Be There", a song about extreme affection for someone to the point of ego death. In June 2021, she released Milk Teeth, an EP written about her adolescence, with the title being a reference to deciduous teeth.

Cole then released a cover of the Weeknd's "The Hills", intended as a stopgap between EPs, and then in September 2021, she released "Camden", a song about divorce, which she had written during a writing session in Copenhagen in October 2020 about her parents' separation at the beginning of the pandemic. The following month, she released "Halloween", which she wrote after researching Pagan and Wiccan traditions around the Samhain period and about having to beg a partner to spend time with them and treat them properly, and accompanied it with a music video set at a Halloween house party. In February 2022, she released "Again", about allowing herself to be repeatedly treated poorly, which was accompanied by a music video directed by Amy Becker-Burnett, and then the following month she released The High Dive, an EP, which featured "Bite Down".

Cole then joined Loud LDN, a collective of London-based women and genderqueer musicians founded in May 2022, as an original member. She released a further track, "Big Mouth", in May 2024, having written the track after being harassed by a drunk male during a trip to London. She followed the track later that month with "Mortal", a track about queer love, and then that July with "Shiny Things", a track about the way some men use women as status symbols. In August, she followed the following month with the EP Pomegranate, which took its name from the Greek myth of Persephone, in which she ate six pomegranate seeds.

== Artistry ==
In a February 2022 interview with Clique, she cited Lorde’s first album Pure Heroine as "a huge huge influence" on her, and additionally cited Father John Misty, the Blue Nile, and Samia as influences; the following month, in an interview with Wordplay, she stated that "the biggest influence" on her writing was from the way Hozier wrote, and that she drew "a lot of influence" from the folk and rock music that her father had played when she was growing up. Pomegranate was inspired by Slowdive, Pinegrove, Sharon Van Etten, Julia Jacklin, Samia, Alabama Shakes, Brittany Howard, My Bloody Valentine, and Duster. Reviewing "Camden", Martha Storey of the Indiependent described Cole's vocals as "Maggie Rogers-esque", while in 2022 Eva Pentel of Fword described her as an "indie-pop" artist.

== Discography ==
=== Extended plays ===
- Milk Teeth (2021)
- The High Dive (2022)
- Pomegranate (2024)

=== Singles ===
- "The Clouds" (2020)
- "Be There" (2021)
- "Stay Awake" (2021)
- "Afternoon Haze" (2021)
- "Camden" (2021)
- "Halloween" (2021)
- "Again" (2022)
- "Big Mouth" (2024)
- "Mortal" (2024)
- "Shiny Things" (2024)
