= Sarzedo =

Sarzedo may refer to the following places:

== Brazil ==
- Sarzedo, Minas Gerais

== Portugal ==
- Sarzedo (Arganil), a civil parish in the municipality of Arganil
- Sarzedo (Covilhã), a civil parish in the municipality of Covilhã
- Sarzedo (Moimenta da Beira), a civil parish in the municipality of Moimenta da Beira
