= Nonô (musician) =

Brazilian musician (born 1997)

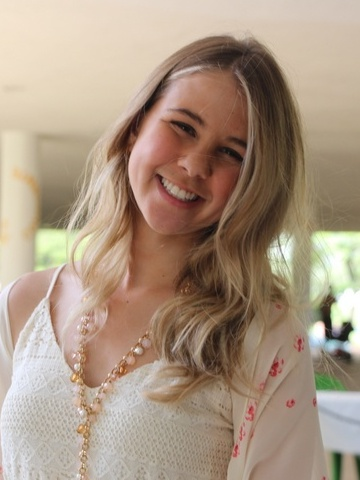
- Nonô in 2015

Background information
- Also known as: Nonô Lellis
- Born: Noêmia Lellis Marques Felippe; October 18, 1997 (age 29); Rio de Janeiro, RJ, Brazil
- Origin: Brazil
- Genres: Pop; MPB
- Occupations: Singer, songwriter
- Instrument: Vocals
- Years active: 2015–present

Noêmia Lellis Marques Felippe (born 18 October 1997), known professionally as Nonô or Nonô Lellis, is a Brazilian musician. She is best known for her appearances on the third series of The Voice Brasil.

Born in Rio de Janeiro and later moving to São Paulo, she began uploading social media content aged ten, before applying for the third series of The Voice Brasil, on which she was a semi-finalist. After moving to London, she released multiple singles and the EP Midnight Mimosas, before joining Loud LDN.

== Life and career ==
=== 1997–2016: Early life and The Voice Brasil ===
Noêmia Lellis Marques Felippe was born on 18 October 1997 in Rio de Janeiro, and was named after her great-grandmother, later acquiring the nickname Nonô. When she was young, her parents divorced, and she went with her mother and siblings to live with her aunt and uncle in a household consisting of nine people from her family; she spent her teenage years in São Paulo. Her brother was a fan of System of a Down, while her grandmother preferred bossa nova, samba, and música popular brasileira and her mother jazz such as Billie Holiday and Chet Baker, and her sister introduced her to bands such as Legião Urbana, Barão Vermelho, and Titãs. When she was ten, she uploaded her first video to YouTube, a Hannah Montana cover.

When she was sixteen, she recorded episodes for the third season of The Voice Brasil, which were broadcast when she was seventeen; she later became a semi-finalist. At the time, she was using the stage name Nonô Lellis. A number of poor experiences with producers in her home country and a desire to switch languages from Portuguese to English prompted her to move to London in January 2016 and move in with her aunt and uncle. At the time, Lellis was reticent to attend university on the grounds that rock musicians did not need to, prompting her uncle to suggest that she attend the Roundhouse youth choir and introduce her to a music producer.

=== 2018–2021: Early releases and Midnight Mimosas ===
In 2018, she released her first single, "Blind to You", a Collie Buddz cover, and later that year she released her second single, "Bite", which was recorded in Stockholm, and was about accepting past mistakes; at the time she wrote the song, she had the fall of man in her head, and wanted to write from the serpent's perspective. The song was released alongside a video shot by Temptress, who also directed the video for her next single, "Nothing to Me", a funk carioca song inspired by texts received from suitors, and about not tolerating poor behaviour from them. In February 2019, she featured on Møøn by Joe Hertz, Pete Tong's son, which explored women's empowerment through spaceflight, an idea they got from tarot card reading.

She then signed to Black Butter Records, and on 11 July 2019, she released "Million Dollars", a song about empowerment and class discrimination, which was followed by a video fifteen days later. A further track, "Loco Gotta Let Go", was written about a partner's refusal to accept a breakup, and was released on 24 October 2019. In 2020, she featured on Parx's "Feel Right Now", which interpolated "Axel F" by Harold Faltermeyer, and in July 2020 she released "No Drama", a song about an ex-boyfriend's poor behaviour. She also wrote "Sorry" in 2020, a TCTS feature, which was released later that year.

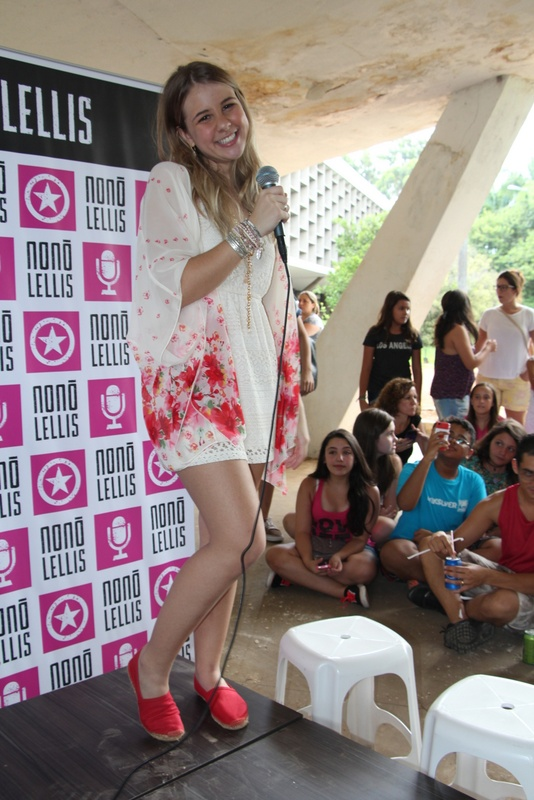
Nonô (2015)

In early 2021, she and Marcus Layton released a cover of Gorillaz's "Feel Good Inc.", which featured vocals Lellis had recorded in her bedroom; at the time Layton pitched the idea to Lellis, she had been rehearsing the song with musician friends during jam sessions. The following March, she released "La La La (2 Dollar)", a song about awkward encounters with people she had grown apart from, and the following month she released "Mimosas", a song about women's autonomy. She then released the EP Midnight Mimosas on 2 July 2021, which had been delayed from 4 June, and which featured "La La La (2 Dollar)" and "Mimosas". In October, she and TCTS released "Off My Mind", a song about addiction, and she then featured on Alok's "Sky High", a song about unconditional love.

=== 2022–present: "Deep" and Love Island ===
In February 2022, she supported Example on his UK tour. While there, Bou attended a show at which he told Example how much he had inspired him, went home, created the song's beat, and sent it to Example. Example then began freestyling melodies and lyrics in front of Nonô, and invited her to follow suit; the pair later headed into a studio to finish what would later become "Deep", which was released in May 2022. A music video was released for the song, which was filmed on a used industrial boat on the River Thames beneath Tower Bridge and required multiple takes, causing traffic congestion. The song later appeared on Example's album We May Grow Old But We Never Grow Up.

In late April 2022, she featured on Majestic's "Time to Groove", which sampled Earth, Wind & Fire's "Let's Groove", and was used in the 27 June broadcast of series eight of Love Island. Fifteen days earlier, her feature on Welshy's "All Day" had been used in the same series; the following month, the song entered the Official Irish Homegrown Chart, peaking at No. 2, and the following January, the song was nominated for RTÉ's Choice Music Prize Song of the Year 2022. Later that year, she released "Lovesick", a song about a break-up from a three-year relationship she had been in, and about the pining she was experiencing.

In March 2023, she and Switch Disco performed "React", that band's collaboration with Ella Henderson and Robert Miles, on the Reunion episode of the ninth series of Love Island, and later that year, she released "ATM" featuring Baby Tate, a song about sharing wealth. Tate was added after Lellis showed the song to her label, who felt it incomplete. A music video was released for the song, which featured both Lellis and Tate. She then released "Domingo", which she co-wrote with Henry Tucker and Punctual, and about falling in love with people not from Latin America. An additional verse was added at the label's request after they felt it was too short.

== Artistry ==
Asked by Lock Magazine in May 2021 which "women in pop" had inspired her, Lellis cited Nathy Peluso, Tkay Maidza, Kali Uchis, Doja Cat, and "icons and rulers of pop like Rihanna, Beyoncé, J-Lo, Christina [Aguilera], and Ariana Grande", and in an interview with Notion in July 2021, she further cited Tim Maia, Jorge Ben, Billie Holiday, Stevie Wonder, and Kanye West as inspirations. She is a member of Loud LDN, a collective of London-based women and genderqueer musicians founded in May 2022.
