= Spider (musician) =

- Born: Jennifer Osakpolor Irabor; 1999 or 2000 (age 26–27); Tallaght, Dublin, Ireland
- Genres: Rock; alternative rock
- Occupation: Musician
- Member of: Loud LDN

Jennifer Osakpolor Irabor (born 1999 or 2000), known professionally as Spider, is an Irish musician born in Tallaght, Dublin, Ireland. Spider moved to London aged 18 to study at BIMM University; after being railroaded by male producers into releasing synth-pop under the name Jenn, she paused making music for a couple of years as a result of disillusionment, and subsequently released alt-pop under the name Spider. She is a member of Loud LDN.

== Life and career ==
=== Early life ===
Jennifer Osakpolor Irabor was born in 1999 or 2000 in Tallaght, Dublin, Ireland to a Luas driver and a teacher, and has a brother. She grew up in a strict Nigerian Catholic household, and attended a Catholic school. Her parents played Nigerian gospel music and chart hits; the first pop album she bought was a Gwen Stefani CD, which she happened upon while she and her father were buying groceries. She spent a period acting, though quit aged twelve, before going through phases of writing, YouTube, and graphic design. After being banned from attending concerts, she found Twitter and Tumblr communities, and spent time operating multiple Stan Twitter accounts, including jointly running a 5 Seconds of Summer stan account along with two other women from London.

"I remember being so gassed about Halsey because she was half Black. It was the most white-passing, like, crumbs, but I was like, thank god! [...] In my head, I thought there didn’t seem to be a lot of us in the scene, so that really motivated me to be there as a Black woman and make that type of music. I remember going into my dad’s room at 1am, like, ‘I think I’m gonna make alternative music because there’s not enough Black women in it’."

— Irabor talking to Dork in July 2023

Around this time, she discovered alternative artists such as Bring Me the Horizon, Halsey, and Lorde; after hearing Halsey's Badlands, she decided to pursue making alternative music, on the grounds that there were not enough Black women making music of this genre. She began writing original compositions aged sixteen, after seeing success from Black Irish artists Soulé and Hare Squead, and after her father bought her a cheap Argos keyboard and a friend gave her lessons; her early efforts were attempts at aping her favourite artists. Aged 18, she moved to London in order to study at BIMM University, and began releasing synth-pop under the name Jenn; at the time, male producers were unwilling to allow her sound to diversify beyond R&B, and she left the music industry disillusioned for just under two years.

=== Career ===
By the time of the COVID-19 pandemic in the United Kingdom, she was severely depressed, and lockdown forced her to confront her feelings; reenergised, she resumed production, adopting the stage name Spider after spiders began appearing in her room on the grounds that they were a sign to resume being creative. One of the first tracks she released after returning to making music was "Water Sign", a track partly inspired by Olokun, an androgynous Nigerian deity. The track went viral online in spite of blogs declining coverage; by April 2023, the track had been liked over 160,000 times on TikTok.

Her follow-up, "I'm Fine! I'm Good! I'm Perfect", was written following an emotional breakdown on her twenty first birthday; a music video for the song was released, which was inspired by staples of teenage pop culture such as house parties, Tumblr, and Skins. A TikTok video used to promote the single became very popular with people of colour before receiving large amounts of negative comments and then deleted by TikTok, prompting Irabor to upload a video accusing TikTok's reporting system of being used against marginalised communities. She then released an EP, "C.O.A.", which stood for "Coming of Age"; intended as an authentic representation of Black teenage life, the album included "Water Sign", "I'm Fine! I'm Good! I'm Perfect", and focus track "U Get High/I Get Nothing", which was written about her experiences of poor treatment by a partner. She then joined Loud LDN, a collective of London-based women and genderqueer musicians founded in May 2022.

Shortly after taking a break from TikTok, she entered into a session with Earl Saga, who she had met via industry connections she had made following the success of "Water Sign". After taking the view that music should be used to make radical statements, she wrote "America's Next Top Model", a belligerent response to those who had attempted to shut her down, which she released in February 2023; a music video for the song was released, in which Irabor dances while ignoring white men screaming at her. A subsequent single, "Growing Into It", detailed her contempt for her friends' clout-chasing ex-boyfriends, and in April 2023, she released the EP Hell or High Water, which included "America's Next Top Model" and "Growing Into It". She then supported Blackpink on their Born Pink World Tour. In November 2023, she released the single "Straight Out the Oven", a song which queried her desires to be conventionally attractive and for toxic men to validate her, and announced a third EP, An Object of Desire, which contained her take on her experience of objectification, desire, and intimacy as a young adult who had grown up in a Catholic environment. She released a further single, "Daisy Chain", a track about having her personal space invaded, followed by An Object of Desire in February 2024.

== Artistry ==
In an April 2022 interview with Notion, Irabor noted that Spider was predominantly inspired by Lorde, Halsey, and Taylor Swift, specifically citing Swift's way with words, and noted that she gravitated towards artists with thriving online communities. For Hell or High Water, she compiled her sound by analysing what she making notes on songs she liked, such as the bassline from Charli XCX's "Vroom Vroom" and the guitar from Grimes' "Flesh Without Blood"; the notes for the music video for "America's Next Top Model" were nineteen pages long. In February 2024, The Irish Times wrote that much of her current influence was coming from women-fronted 1990s rock and alternative bands such as Veruca Salt and Hole, with further inspiration taken from Wet Leg, Gus Dapperton, and Momma. In addition, Tara Joshi of The Guardian described Hell or High Water as "throb[bing] with dissonant punk energy". In April 2023, NME described her works as "alt-pop".

Irabor is noted for having a confident on-stage persona; during her performance at the 2023 The Great Escape Festival, she called out her audience several times for responding unenthusiastically, while during one performance as part of DIY's "Hello 2024" series at The Old Blue Last in London, she used one track to call for the audience to name their "shitty exes" and ended by telling the audience "to tell bigots to go fuck themselves". In July 2023, Dork attributed her brashness to going viral during the pandemic, and therefore not having to perform live until later, which meant she had longer to develop confidence in being herself on stage. For her debut headline show, at Camden Assembly, she recruited fellow Black alternative musicians Safesp8ce and Bukky to perform on the bill, so as to make the gig a celebration of Black alternative music.
