= Made in Dagenham =

2010 British film by Nigel Cole

- Theatrical release poster
- Directed by: Nigel Cole
- Written by: William Ivory
- Produced by: Elizabeth Karlsen; Stephen Woolley
- Starring: Sally Hawkins; Bob Hoskins; Miranda Richardson; Geraldine James; Rosamund Pike; Andrea Riseborough; Jaime Winstone; Daniel Mays; Richard Schiff
- Cinematography: John de Borman
- Edited by: Michael Parker
- Music by: David Arnold
- Production companies: Audley Films; BBC Films; BMS Finance; HanWay Films; Lipsync Productions; Mittal Productions; Number 9 Films; UK Film Council
- Distributed by: Paramount Pictures
- Release dates: 11 September 2010 (TIFF); 1 October 2010 (United Kingdom)
- Running time: 113 minutes
- Country: United Kingdom
- Language: English
- Budget: £5 million
- Box office: $12.3 million

Made in Dagenham is a 2010 British comedy-drama film directed by Nigel Cole, written by William Ivory, and starring Sally Hawkins, Bob Hoskins, Miranda Richardson, Geraldine James, Rosamund Pike, Andrea Riseborough, Jaime Winstone, Daniel Mays and Richard Schiff. It dramatises the Ford sewing machinists strike of 1968 that aimed for equal pay for women. Its theme song, with lyrics by Billy Bragg, is performed by Sandie Shaw, a native of the area and former Ford Dagenham clerk.

A stage musical version of the film opened at London's Adelphi Theatre in 2014.

== Plot ==
The Ford Dagenham plant, the fifth largest internationally, employs under 200 women of their 55,000 employees. Rita O'Grady is one of the machinists who sew the cars' upholstery. In May 1968, their foreman Albert announces their complaint about being regraded to lower-paid unskilled labor has not been resolved. The workers vote unanimously to follow through on proposed strike threats if management does not meet their demands in the morning.

Although hung over from last night, Rita confronts her son's teacher Mr. Clarke for caning him. He states it was necessary as families on the estate lack the ability to teach discipline. Speechless, Rita storms out.

At work, Albert recruits Rita with Connie to join union negotiations with management the next day. When Rita tells her husband Eddie about the impending upheaval at work he laughs. The female workers until now had never organised strikes but, seeing her frustration, he apologizes.

Eddie mentions the male workers expect the women to crumble. He is dumbstruck when Rita announces she will be meeting with the big bosses the next day.

At the union-Ford meeting, when a union rep proposes giving Ford yet two more weeks to respond, Rita speaks up. She proves their work is skilled by showing them upholstery scraps which must be assembled without a template. Rita then reiterates their strike details, leaving.

When Albert admires Rita's gumption, she admits she improvised. Rita declares their walkout upon reaching the machinists' floor. Newly instated Employment Secretary for the Labour Party Barbara Castle immediately wants to swing into action, as a myriad of protests are without resolutions. Meanwhile the machinists wield protest signs outside work.

Albert convinces Rita to become the machinists' spokesperson. Connie has been fine, but her ill husband is a distraction. Rita asks Albert why he is so devoted. His mother struggled to raise him and his brothers with factory wages, although men received double for the same work. Albert wants to help fight for equal pay across the board.

Outside of the school for pickup, as it is pouring rain, Rita is invited into Lisa Hopkins' car. She requests she sign a petition to sack Mr. Clarke for bullying. They chat, realizing they are kindred spirits, although Lisa is wealthy.

Management sends a standard notice they distribute to workers after a walkout. Indignant, Rita confronts them, refusing to accept its false implications, as they had followed protocol. She then declares an immediate outright stoppage.

Rita and her colleagues drum up support nationwide. Eddie struggles at home with the domestic chores and kids. The machinists head to Westminster, appearing on the BBC. Car production in Dagenham grinds to a halt due to the lack of seats. Eddie hardly speaks to Rita when she arrives home, then abruptly goes to bed.

The international attention alarms Ford Headquarters in the US, so company representative Robert Tooley is sent there. Arriving at Lisa's, as her husband Peter runs UK operations, Tooley asks her well-educated opinion. He is displeased with Lisa's direct and open criticism of their handling of union negotiations.

Determined to break the strike, Tooley rattles the union leaders' cages, then seeks weakness in the machinists. Discovering Sandra's desire to model, they contact her to appear in Ford's promotional pamphlets. Rita shows up and explains how they are manipulating her.

Finding Rita on the estate, Lisa happily declares they got Mr Clarke sacked. As she is extremely well-educated and married to the head of UK Ford operations, she now feels helpless as a married woman. Lisa gives Rita her full support, wishing her success in their fight.

Rita and many machinists attend an important trade union conference. She speaks to the crowd of men on the importance of fair pay for women. The union votes to support them.

Seeing Barbara Castle before her meeting with the machinists, Tooley threatens Ford could pull factories from the UK if they do not relent. When Rita et al meet with her, she stands firm on fair pay. Barbara calls Tooley’s bluff, going outside with the machinists, announcing they will return to work with a decent raise. An equal pay bill will soon be pushed.

The successful strike led to the Equal Pay Act 1970.

== Locations ==
- Mardyke estate
- Dagenham Civic Centre
- Eastbourne
- Merthyr Tydfil
- Croydon

== Cast ==
- Sally Hawkins as Rita O'Grady
- Bob Hoskins as Albert
- Miranda Richardson as Employment Secretary Barbara Castle
- Geraldine James as Connie
- Rosamund Pike as Lisa Hopkins
- Andrea Riseborough as Brenda
- Jaime Winstone as Sandra
- Daniel Mays as Eddie O'Grady
- Richard Schiff as Robert Tooley
- Lorraine Stanley as Monica
- Nicola Duffett as Eileen
- Andrew Lincoln as Mr Clarke
- Rupert Graves as Peter Hopkins
- Joseph Mawle as Gordon
- Robbie Kay as Graham O'Grady
- Kenneth Cranham as Monty Taylor
- John Sessions as Prime Minister Harold Wilson
- Marcus Hutton as Grant
- Roger Lloyd-Pack as George
- Phil Cornwell as Dave
- Matthew Aubrey as Brian
- Karen Seacombe as Marge
- Thomas Arnold as Martin
- Sian Scott as Sharon O'Grady
- Philip Perry as Arthur Horovitz
- Peter-Hugo Daly as Bartholomew
- Simon Armstrong as Rogers
- Matilda Cole as Emily
- Romy Taylor as Rosie
- Danny Huston as American Boss (voice only)
- Mitchell Mullen as Kronnfeld
- Matt King as Trevor Innes
- Gina Bramhill as Hopkins' Secretary
- Joseph Kloska as Undersecretary 1
- Miles Jupp as Undersecretary 2

== Reception ==
Of 129 Rotten Tomatoes reviews, 80% of critics gave the film a positive review.

Maclean's, in a review for the film's 2010 Toronto International Film Festival premiere, called it a ".. combination of Milk and Mad Men.. It’s a film that blatantly condemns sexism and shows, despite its mostly light tone, the real cost of fighting for civil rights. The bee-hived and bobbed characters are fully fleshed and well-rounded even though they fit into ’60s archetypes, and the period piece balances optimism and realism in a way that’s both compelling and fun to watch."

Xan Brooks of The Guardian gave it three stars out of five, calling it ".. uncomplicated fare, overly spiced with 60s cliches.... But the film is also robust, amiable and so warm-hearted you'd be a churl to take against it.", while David Cox, also of The Guardian, gave a less glowing review, suggesting that, despite initial potential, ".. a promising opportunity has been squandered."

Roger Ebert gave the film three and a half stars out of four. Mark Kermode praised the film highly on his weekly show on BBC Radio 5 Live. He ranked it as his fourth favourite film of 2010, beating such films as The Social Network and Another Year.

=== Accolades ===
Made in Dagenham was nominated for four awards at the 2010 British Academy Film Awards; Outstanding British Film, Costume Design, Make Up & Hair Design and Supporting Actress (Miranda Richardson).

Award	Category	Recipient(s)	Result
ALFS Awards	Supporting Actress of the Year	Rosamund Pike	Nominated
British Academy Film Awards	Best British Film		Nominated
British Academy Film Awards	Best Costume Design	Louise Stjernsward	Nominated
British Academy Film Awards	Best Makeup and Hair	Elizabeth Yianni-Georgiou	Nominated
British Academy Film Awards	Best Actress in a Supporting Role	Miranda Richardson	Nominated
British Independent Film Awards	Best Supporting Actor	Bob Hoskins	Nominated
British Independent Film Awards	Best Supporting Actress	Rosamund Pike	Nominated
British Independent Film Awards	Best Performance by an Actress	Sally Hawkins	Nominated
British Independent Film Awards	Best Screenplay of a British Independent Film	William Ivory	Nominated
EDA Award	Women's Image Award	Sally Hawkins	Nominated
Eddie Awards	Best Edited Feature Film – Comedy or Musical	Michael Parker	Nominated
Evening Standard British Film Awards	Standard Award for Best Actress	Sally Hawkins	Nominated
Evening Standard British Film Awards	Standard Award for Best Technical/Artistic Achievement	Andrew McAlpine	Nominated
Satellite Awards	Best Film		Nominated
Satellite Awards	Best Actress – Motion Picture Musical or Comedy	Sally Hawkins	Nominated
Women's Image Network Awards	Actress Feature Film	Sally Hawkins	Nominated

== Soundtrack ==
A soundtrack for the film was released, with the following tracks:

1. "(There's) Always Something There to Remind Me" - Sandie Shaw
2. "Get Ready" - The Temptations
3. "Israelites" - Desmond Dekker & The Aces
4. "It's a Man's Man's Man's World" - James Brown
5. "Days" - The Kinks
6. "Can I Get a Witness" - Dusty Springfield
7. "All or Nothing" - Small Faces
8. "The Boat That I Row" - Lulu
9. "It's Getting Better" - Mama Cass
10. "A Groovy Kind of Love" - The Mindbenders
11. "Wooly Bully" - Sam The Sham & The Pharaohs
12. "Sunday Will Never Be The Same" - Spanky and Our Gang
13. "Green Tambourine" - Lemon Pipers
14. "Paper Sun" - Traffic
15. "Friday on My Mind" - The Easybeats
16. "With a Girl Like You" - The Troggs
17. "You Can Get It If You Really Want" - Desmond Dekker
18. "Made In Dagenham" - Sandie Shaw

The title song was written by David Arnold and Billy Bragg just for the film. Sandie Shaw had worked at the real Ford Dagenham plant before her career as a singer.

== Musical ==
A musical adaption of the film opened on 5 November 2014 at the Adelphi Theatre in London. Scripted by Richard Bean and directed by Rupert Goold, it starred Gemma Arterton in the lead role.
