= Issey Cross =

English singer

- Also known as: Issey Cross
- Born: Isabella Eliza Victoria Cross; 2000 (age 25–26); Kent, England
- Genres: UK Dubstep - Drum and Bass - EDM
- Occupations: Singer; songwriter
- Years active: 2021–present
- Member of: Loud LDN

2026 update- Issey was the vocal/ songwriter on Eli Brown's recent "Electrify" song that was part of his Panic Attack album released via @Insomniac Records.

Isabella Eliza Victoria Cross is an English musician. Her three features, on Wilkinson's "Used to This", Luude's "Oh My" featuring Moby, and Nathan Dawe & Bru-C's "Oh Baby" featuring bshp, charted on the UK Singles Chart at numbers 33, 98 and 35 respectively, and her solo single, "Bittersweet Goodbye", charted at No. 19. She is a member of Loud LDN.

== Life and career ==
=== Early life ===
Isabella Eliza Victoria Cross was born in Kent to two hairdressers, and started making music after being gifted a guitar for her thirteenth birthday. As a teenager, she would perform gigs in local pubs around Sevenoaks and Tunbridge Wells under the name Issey C; her first gig was in the pub opposite her father's salon. She told 'cene Magazine in June 2021 that she was under eighteen at the time, that both she and her father would lie about her age so that pubs would allow her to perform, and that she would wear "loads of make-up so that it made [her] look older". After her GCSEs, she moved to Tottenham on her own to attend music college; in her first year, she took a music performance course, and in her second, she transferred to a music production course.

=== Solo releases ===
Her debut single, "Who", was released on 15 January 2021, and was written after the song's co-writer and producer told Cross about the experience of being cheated on. A second single, "Boys Make Promises", was released on 26 February 2021, and was written about men who make her promises and then disappear. Both tracks appeared on her extended play Mirrors Don't Lie, which was released on 26 March 2021, which had been delayed by COVID-19; she told Popsugar in March 2021 that she "wrote most of [its] songs nearly two years ago".

On 2 April 2021, she released Hot 'N Cold, a cover version of the Katy Perry song. On 24 June 2021, she released "M40 (Love Me Now)", an ode to the extended periods of time she spent driving on the M40 motorway owing to her being in a long-distance relationship. On 13 August 2021, she released "Tired Of Everybody", a song about post-lockdown social anxiety.

On 26 April 2024, Cross released "Energy In My Town", a track produced by K Motionz, Sudley, and The Elements. On 6 December 2024, she released "Different Planets", produced by John Foyle and Rich Cooper.

On 7 February 2025, Cross released "Sirens", co-written with Sammy Virji, and produced by LACONIC. On 16 May 2025, she released "Body Talk", produced by Punctual.

=== Collaborations ===
On 19 November 2021, she featured on Wilkinson's Used to This, which charted at number 33 on the UK Singles Chart. On 6 April 2022, she released "Downers" with Jalle. The pair wrote the song in lockdown over Zoom, with it discussing their insecurities and what they would change about themselves. On 12 January 2023, she and Luude released Oh My, which charted at number 98 on the UK Singles Chart. On 3 February 2023, she and bshp featured on Nathan Dawe and Bru-C's "Oh Baby", which charted at #35 on the UK Singles Chart, and on 24 March 2023, she, Hybrid Minds, and Fred V released "Breathe Out". On 30 June 2023, she released "Bittersweet Goodbye", which was produced by Luude, and samples his remix of "Bitter Sweet Symphony" by The Verve. The track was intended as a Luude release, but scheduling conflicts meant he could not release it, so Cross took it for herself. The song was promoted with a music video, filmed at a Homebass rave, and charted at No. 19 on the UK Singles Chart.

On 23 February 2024, Cross released "Sleepwalking", a single with British rapper Songer and produced by Shapes & Sudley.

On 22 August 2024, Cross featured on "6 Feet Under" with producer Sudley.

On 25 April 2025, Cross featured on "Nostalgia" with producer Sammy Virji.

== Artistry ==
Cross cites Lorde and Taylor Swift as her main inspirations. She is a member of Loud LDN, a collective of female musicians based in London and its suburbs, alongside Piri, Venbee, Charlotte Plank, and Willow Kayne.

== Discography ==
=== Extended plays ===
Title	Details
Mirrors Don't Lie	Released: 26 March 2021; Label: Cult Behaviour; Format: Digital download, streaming

=== Singles ===
==== As lead artist ====
List of singles as a lead artist, with selected chart positions, certifications, and album name
Title	Year	Peak chart positions			Certifications	Album
Title	Year	UK	UK Dance	IRE	Certifications	Album
"M40 (Love Me Now)"	2021	—	—	—		Non-album singles
"Tired of Everybody"	2021	—	—	—		Non-album singles
"Used to This" (with Wilkinson)	2022	33	11	—	BPI: Platinum	Cognition
"Oh My" (with Luude featuring Moby)	2023	98	26	—	BPI: Silver	Non-album singles
"Breathe Out" (with Hybrid Minds and Fred V)	2023	—	—	—		Non-album singles
"Bittersweet Goodbye"	2023	19	11	50	BPI: Gold	TBA
"Sleepwalking" (featuring Songer)	2024	—	—	—		TBA
"Energy in My Town"	2024	—	—	—		TBA
"6 Feet Under" (with Sudley)	2024	—	—	—		TBA
"Different Planets"	2024	—	—	—		TBA
"Sirens"	2025	—	—	—		TBA
"Nostalgia" (with Sammy Virji)	2025	—	—	—		TBA
"Body Talk"	2025	—	—	—		TBA
"—" denotes a recording that did not chart or was not released in that territory.

==== As featured artist ====
List of singles as a featured artist, with selected chart positions, certifications, and album name
Title	Year	Peak chart positions	Certifications	Album
Title	Year	UK	Certifications	Album
"Downers" (Jalle featuring Issey Cross)	2022	—		Non-album single
"Oh Baby" (Nathan Dawe and Bru-C featuring bshp and Issey Cross)	2023	35	BPI: Silver	If Heaven Had a Phone Line
"—" denotes a recording that did not chart or was not released in that territory.
