= Bshp =

English singer-songwriter

bshp
- Birth name: Gabriella Bishop
- Born: Kent, England
- Occupations: Singer; songwriter
- Labels: Island Records

Gabriella Bishop, professionally known as bshp (pronounced 'bishop'), is an English musician from Kent. She featured on Nathan Dawe and Bru-C's "Oh Baby" featuring Issey Cross, which peaked at No. 35 on the UK Singles Chart. She has performed at Loud LDN events.

== Life and career ==
=== Early life and Gabriella Vixen ===
Gabriella Bishop grew up in a large family in Kent. She attended weekly dance lessons while at school, and started writing songs while working as a university timetabler. Her early work was released under the name Gabriella Vixen, a name given to her by a friend. As Vixen, she released "Keep Your Love On Me" (with Freedo) on September 22, 2017; she had originally come to Freedo's attention after demonstrating a track intended for Rita Ora. She then released "Golden" on February 26, 2018, a love song about self-worth, and on April 20, 2018, she released "Maybe", which described relationship problems. On September 20, 2018, she released "Old Mistake", a warning against reuniting with ex-partners, and on February 14, 2019, she released "Fool", a song about showing strength after a breakup. On March 20, 2019, she featured on the album track "Wait for You" from Talos' EP "Iridescent" featuring Coops, and on May 3, 2019, she released "Wave" (with Jay Wilcox and MAFRO).

=== bshp ===
Bishop then signed to Island Records and changed her stage name to bshp, as she wanted a fresh start. She released "bshp" on January 17, 2020, which contained covers of "Passionfruit" by Drake and "Kissing You" by Des'ree. The latter was one of seven covers of songs she loved and had always wanted to cover. It appeared on the January 30, 2020, broadcast of Love Island, playing during a kiss between contestants Nas Majeed and Demi Jones; as of February 2022, the song has been streamed more than 3 million times on Spotify. "Passionfruit" would later feature on the August 4, 2021, broadcast of the following series.

On January 22, 2021, she released "Never Mind", a song about a guilty pleasure romance, on Island; an acoustic version would also be used on Love Island on July 10, 2022. On March 19, 2021, she released "Solid Gold", a collaboration with Disciples, and on May 7, 2021, she released Every Song, a collaboration with Duvall from Disciples. In 2021, she left Island Records, and on December 9, 2021, she released a solo single, "STFU", a song about reclaiming power after a bad relationship.

On March 11, 2022, Bishop and numerous other musicians (Note: Including SABYNA, Lucie Silvas, Anna Rose, Twinnie-Lee Moore, Louisa Johnson, PLANT, Tigirlily Gold, Corrina, Wendy Moten, Julia Cole, bshp, Bianca Rose, Kelsey Gill, Parker McKay, Alyssa Bonagura, Summer Overstreet, Victoria Bigelow, Kelleigh Bannen, and Shelly Fairchild) all featured on I Know A Woman's "I Know A Woman", a charity release designed to raise money for the MusiCares Foundation. On February 3, 2023, she and Issey Cross were featured on Nathan Dawe and Bru-C's "Oh Baby", which charted at No. 35 on the UK Singles Chart, and on February 21, 2023, it was used on the ninth series of Love Island. In March 2023, she performed at Colours in Hoxton as part of a Loud LDN event, and on July 7, 2023, she released "Sweet".

== Artistry ==
Bishop told Purple Melon in October 2018 that her influences were Chris Brown, Mariah Carey, Ariana Grande, Whitney Houston, and Stevie Wonder, as well as "[a]nything soul-influenced, [and] old-school R&B".
