= Molly Burman =

English musician (born 2001)

- Born: Molly Ciara Burman; London, England
- Genres: alt-pop; indie pop
- Occupation: Musician
- Member of: Loud LDN; Molly & The Dolly Shop

Molly Ciara Burman is an English musician from Hornsey. She has released two EPs, Fool Me With Flattery and Worlds Within Worlds, and is a member of Loud LDN. Her father, Lance Burman, was a member of Chiefs of Relief.

== Life and career ==
Molly Ciara Burman was born in Kentish Town, before moving to Hornsey. Growing up, she listened to her parents' music, such as the Beatles, Fleetwood Mac, and David Bowie, and aged six, she and her father wrote a Christmas song together; she would resume writing again after listening to Adele's 19, and switched from writing on piano to writing on guitar after becoming obsessed with the Vamps. She and her father started producing tracks together when she was thirteen. She released her first single, "Happy Things" in 2018, took a break from music, and then resumed releasing music in 2021 after returning to Spotify and discovering that "Happy Things" had acquired a million listens on the platform.

In March 2021, she released "Fool Me With Flattery", which she wrote using the stereotype of a mansplaining misogynist after a day of misogyny from men in her life. The following month she released "Everytime", a song about learning to enjoy her own company following multiple instances of being ghosted, and in June 2021, she released "Debt", a riposte to a sex pest she encountered during a night out, which was accompanied by a music video. Later that year, she released the Fool Me With Flattery EP, which featured "Fool Me With Flattery", "Everytime", and "Debt", and was written, recorded, and produced by Burman and her father. In March 2022, she released "Pretty Girl", which she wrote after listening to "All the Pretty Girls" by Kaleo, and about feeling insecurities.

In May 2023, she released "Beautiful People", a song about dating while queer, having realised that she was attracted to all genders aged 19 after listening to her queer friends' playlists and watching RuPaul's Drag Race, and having realised that all of her songs to that point had been about men. A video was shot for the song using her friends from her local pub, the Faltering Fallback. She then released "Potential", a grunge song about seeing a partner for what they were instead of what they could be. In August 2023, she released Worlds Within Worlds, a six-track EP, named after the notion that everyone has their own solar system, and with each track set on a different planet of MollyLand; the song was promoted with the lead track "Friday Pretty", which was written about her local pub quiz, and included it, "Beautiful People", and "Potential". In 2024, she began performing as one fifth of Molly & The Dolly Shop.

== Artistry and personal life ==
Burman's music has been described as indie pop by The Line of Best Fit and as alt-pop by Clash. Her Fool Me With Flattery EP was influenced by Maxi Priest's "Love Train", David Bowie's "Magic Dance", Shirley & Company's "Shame Shame Shame", Lucius's "Until We Get There", and Kimbra's "Settle Down". Burman's grandfather was the director for the London Vintage Jazz Orchestra Dave Burman, her mother is an Irish singer who sang with Shane MacGowan and as part of the singing comedy act The Frigidaires, and her father was Lancelot Andrew Robert "Lance" Burman, a guitar teacher, who played bass for Chiefs of Relief, and played bass and guitar on Mekon and Marc Almond's "Please Stay", a cover of the Cryin' Shames' song, which charted at No. 91 on the UK Singles Chart. She is a member of Loud LDN, a collective of London-based women and genderqueer musicians set up in May 2022, which she joined a month after it was created.
