= Bittersweet Goodbye =

2023 song by English musician Issey Cross

Single by Issey Cross
- Released: 30 June 2023
- Length: 2:46
- Label: Atlantic UK
- Songwriters: Richard Ashcroft; Issey Cross
- Producer: Luude

Issey Cross singles chronology
"Breathe Out" (2023)	"Bittersweet Goodbye" (2023)	"Sleepwalking" (2024)

Music video
- "Bittersweet Goodbye" on YouTube

"Bittersweet Goodbye" is a song by English musician Issey Cross, released on 30 June 2023. Produced by Australian musician Luude, the song heavily samples the song "Bitter Sweet Symphony", released by the Verve in 1997, which itself samples an orchestral version of the song "The Last Time" by the Rolling Stones. It charted at No. 19 on the UK Singles Chart.

== Background and composition ==
In March 2022, Australian musician Luude uploaded to SoundCloud a drum and bass mashup of "Bitter Sweet Symphony" and the Police's "Message in a Bottle". He and Issey Cross got in touch with one another following the release of her Wilkinson track "Used to This", which had charted at No. 33 on the UK Singles Chart in 2021. They worked on "Oh My" together, which credited Moby due to it sampling his song "Porcelain", and charted at No. 98 on the UK Singles Chart; around this time, Luude sent Cross his "Bittersweet Symphony" remix, which she later quickly wrote over with some friends, and released without crediting Luude due to scheduling conflicts. In an interview with the Official Charts Company, she noted that she had previously intended on releasing some more songs as a featured artist, but that "this one just made sense", and that she had been prepared for the track to also be burned off on SoundCloud and was surprised by how painless the sample's clearance was.

"Bittersweet Goodbye" uses a sped-up sample of the Verve's 1997 track "Bitter Sweet Symphony", which in turn uses a sped-up sample of the Andrew Oldham Orchestra's sped-up cover version of the Rolling Stones' "The Last Time", which in turn interpolated (and took inspiration from the Staple Singers' recording of) the traditional gospel track "This May Be the Last Time"; the Verve had previously been caught out by only clearing the sample from Decca Records and not the rights to use the song from Allen Klein's ABKCO Records, and the band's vocalist Richard Ashcroft later had to relinquish all rights to the song to clear its use, only reacquiring them in 2019 shortly after changing management and a full ten years after Klein died and left ABKCO to his son Jody.

However, Replay Heaven claims "Bittersweet Goodbye" uses a sample replay they recorded specifically for this track, rather than the original sample.

== Release and music video ==
"Bittersweet Goodbye" was released on 30 June 2023. TikTok promotion for the song was somewhat haphazard; in an interview with Noctismag.com, she noted that she and "some friends" had randomly decided to film videos of themselves dancing to the song during club nights with AirPods in, and that the song's music video had been filmed at a Homebass rave for no reason other than she had been asked to perform the show and that she wanted to release the track as soon as she could. A subsequent remix was released by Tiësto, which was premiered during a Tomorrowland set at which Cross performed drunk, and which was released on 18 August 2023.

== Reception ==
"Bittersweet Goodbye" charted at No. 19 on the UK Singles Chart. In September 2023, during its first week on the top 40, the BBC ran a piece noting that "about one in four current UK Top 40 hits" made use of samples, picking out the use of Dionne Warwick's "Walk On By" in that week's number two "Paint the Town Red" by Doja Cat, and also mentioning that Bou's "Closer" sampled Robert Miles' "Children" and that Charli XCX's "Speed Drive" interpolated Toni Basil's "Mickey" and sampled Robyn's "Cobrastyle", the latter a cover of the Teddybears song of the same name.

== Track listings ==
Digital single

1. "Bittersweet Goodbye" – 2:46

Lens remix

1. "Bittersweet Goodbye – Lens remix" – 3:21
2. "Bittersweet Goodbye" – 2:46

Tiësto's Hardcore remix

1. "Bittersweet Goodbye – Tiësto's Hardcore remix" – 2:38
2. "Bittersweet Goodbye" – 2:46

K Motionz remix

1. "Bittersweet Goodbye – K Motionz remix" – 2:57

Acoustic version

1. "Bittersweet Goodbye – acoustic" – 2:30

== Charts ==
Chart (2023)	Peak position
Ireland (IRMA)	73
Slovakia Airplay (ČNS IFPI)	27
UK Singles (OCC)	19
UK Dance (OCC)	11

== Release history ==
Release history for "Bittersweet Goodbye"
Region	Version	Date	Format	Label	Ref.
Various	Original version	30 June 2023	Digital download; streaming	Polydor	
Various	Lens remix	28 July 2023	Digital download; streaming	Polydor	
Various	Tiësto's Hardcore remix	18 August 2023	Digital download; streaming	Polydor	
Various	K Motionz remix	8 September 2023	Digital download; streaming	Polydor	
Various	Acoustic version	15 September 2022	Digital download; streaming	Polydor	

== Certifications ==
Region	Certification	Certified units/sales
New Zealand (RMNZ)	Platinum	30,000^{‡}
United Kingdom (BPI)	Gold	400,000^{‡}
^{‡} Sales+streaming figures based on certification alone.
