= The Voice Brasil season 3 =

The Voice Brasil
- Season 3
- Hosted by: Tiago Leifert; Fernanda Souza
- Judges: Claudia Leitte; Lulu Santos; Daniel; Carlinhos Brown
- Winners: Danilo Reis & Rafael
- Runners-up: Kim Lírio; Lui Medeiros; Romero Ribeiro
- Finals venue: Citibank Hall

Release
- Original network: Rede Globo
- Original release: September 18 – December 25, 2014

Season chronology
- ← Previous; Season 2 Next → Season 4

The third season of The Voice Brasil, premiered on Rede Globo on September 18, 2014 in the 10:30 p.m. (BRT/AMT) slot immediately following the primetime telenovela Império.

The 22- and 24-year-old sertanejo duo Danilo Reis e Rafael won the competition on December 25, 2014 with 43% of the votes cast. This marked Lulu Santos' first win as a coach, the first stolen artist to win a Brazilian season of The Voice, and the first time in any The Voice franchise that a duo won the competition.

== Selection process ==
=== Auditions ===
Cities where the auditions were held.

Online applications for The Voice Brasil were open on December 26, 2013 from April 13, 2014.

The selected applications were then called to regional auditions held in seven capital cities across Brazil:

Date	Location
April 23	Belo Horizonte
April 30	Salvador
May 14	Brasília
May 21	Fortaleza
May 28	Porto Alegre
June 3	São Paulo
June 10	Rio de Janeiro

== Coaches and host ==
All four coaches return for their third season. Tiago Leifert, the host of the show, also returned. Comedian Miá Mello was replaced by actress Fernanda Souza as the show's social media correspondent.

Rogério Flausino and Luiza Possi both returned as team advisors for Team Brown and Team Daniel, while Di Ferrero and Dudu Nobre replaced Gaby Amarantos and Maria Gadu as team advisors for Team Lulu and Team Claudia.

== Twists ==
=== In the dark auditions ===
During the blind auditions, some candidates will perform behind a red curtain. This curtain will only open if any coach turn his/her chair for the artist, making it possible for the public (as well the other coaches) to see the contestant.

=== Second chance ===
For the first time, selected contestants who failed to turn any chairs in previously two seasons will be given a second chance this season.

== Teams ==
Color key

- Winner
- Runner-up
- Eliminated in the Live shows
- Eliminated in the Live playoffs
- Artist was stolen by another coach at the Battle rounds
- Eliminated in the Battle rounds

Coaches	Top 50 artists			
Claudia Leitte				
Claudia Leitte	Lui Medeiros	Leandro Buenno	Nise Palhares	Kall Medrado
Claudia Leitte	Amarildo Fire	Nathalie Alvim	Millane Hora	Priscila Brenner
Claudia Leitte	~~Nonô Lellis~~	~~Thiago Costa~~	Bruna Tatto	Davi Lins
Claudia Leitte	Karina Duque Estrada	Luana Fernandes	Vinícius Zanin	
Lulu Santos				
Lulu Santos	Danilo Reis & Rafael	Nonô Lellis	Edu Camargo	Maria Alice
Lulu Santos	Deena Love	Gabriel Silva	Dudu Fileti	Twyla
Lulu Santos	~~Isadora Morais~~	~~Lui Medeiros~~	~~Rose Oliver~~	Edmon Costa
Lulu Santos	Mariana Mira	Paulo Soares		
Daniel				
Daniel	Kim Lírio	Jésus Henrique	Vitor & Vanuti	Carla Casarim
Daniel	Kynnie Williams	Thiago Costa	Kiko e Jeanne	Ricardo Diniz
Daniel	~~Danilo Reis & Rafael~~	Flavinha & Léo	Kadu Vianna	Livia Itaborahy
Daniel	Nanda Garcia	Rafaela Melo	Thiago Soares	
Carlinhos Brown				
Carlinhos Brown	Romero Ribeiro	Rose Oliver	Joey Mattos	Paula Marchesini
Carlinhos Brown	Isadora Morais	Princess La Tremenda	Hellen Lyu	Vanessa Borges
Carlinhos Brown	~~Amarildo Fire~~	~~Kynnie Williams~~	Débora Coutinho	Dilauri
Carlinhos Brown	Letícia Pedroza	Ricardo e Ronael		
Note: Italicized names are stolen artists (names struck through within former teams).

== Blind auditions ==
Color key

✔	Coach hit his/her "I WANT YOU" button
	Artist defaulted to this coach's team
	Artist elected to join this coach's team
	Artist eliminated with no coach pressing his or her "I WANT YOU" button
	Artist is an 'All Star' contestant

=== Episode 1 ===
Aired: September 18, 2014

- Group performance: The Voice Brasil Coaches ("Toda Forma de Amor")

Order	Artist	Age	Hometown	Song	Coach's and contestant's choices			
Order	Artist	Age	Hometown	Song	Claudia	Lulu	Daniel	Brown
1	Gabriel Silva	43	Petrópolis	"Hoochie Coochie Man"	✔	✔	✔	✔
2	Anadark Gonçalves	17	Quatiguá	"Tocando em Frente"	—	—	—	—
3	Priscila Brenner	20	N. Hamburgo	"The Scientist"	✔	—	—	—
4	Lívia Itaborahy	25	Belo Horizonte	"Vieste"	—	—	✔	—
5	Nise Palhares	32	Rio de Janeiro	"Pagu"	✔	✔	✔	✔
6	Deena Love	28	São Paulo	"Calling You"	✔	✔	✔	✔
7	Dudu Fileti	38	Armazém	"Tente Outra Vez"	—	✔	✔	✔
8	Bruna Tatto	17	São Paulo	"The Way You..."	✔	—	—	✔
9	Teffy	28	N. Hamburgo	"Set Fire to the Rain"	—	—	—	—
10	Ricardo & Ronael	24–25	Unaí	"Fogão de Lenha"	—	—	—	✔
11	Hellen Lyu	24	São Paulo	"Valerie"	✔	—	—	✔
12	Carla Casarim	28	Londrina	"Verde"	—	—	✔	—

=== Episode 2 ===
Aired: September 25, 2014

- Coach performance: Claudia Leitte ("It Hurt So Bad")

Order	Artist	Age	Hometown	Song	Coach's and contestant's choices			
Order	Artist	Age	Hometown	Song	Claudia	Lulu	Daniel	Brown
1	Twyla	28	Taubaté	"Chain of Fools"	✔	✔	✔	✔
2	Danilo Reis & Rafael	22–23	Betim	"Sinônimos"	✔	✔	✔	✔
3	Isadora Morais	19	São Paulo	"At Last"	—	✔	—	—
4	Biano Rafa	36	Nova Iguaçu	"Recado"	—	—	—	—
5	Letícia Pedroza	27	Rio de Janeiro	"Telefone"	—	—	—	✔
6	Princess La Tremenda	37	Atlanta, United States	"I Say a Little Prayer"	—	—	—	✔
7	Edu Camargo	35	São Paulo	"Eu Preciso Te Esquecer"	✔	✔	—	✔
8	Mariana Mira	23	São José dos Campos	"Karma"	—	✔	—	—
9	Romero Ribeiro	29	Cascavel	"Deixa Acontecer"	—	—	—	✔
10	Amarildo Fire	28	Salvador	"Tantinho"	—	—	—	✔
11	Kiko & Jeanne	37–36	Salvador	"Meu Universo é Você"	—	—	✔	✔

=== Episode 3 ===
Aired: October 9, 2014

- Coach performance: Daniel ("Evidências")

Order	Artist	Age	Hometown	Song	Coach's and contestant's choices			
Order	Artist	Age	Hometown	Song	Claudia	Lulu	Daniel	Brown
1	Vitor & Vanuti	27–25	Apucarana	"Volta Pra Mim"	✔	—	✔	✔
2	Nathalie Alvim	23	São Paulo	"Whole Lotta Love"	✔	✔	✔	✔
3	Kim Lírio	23	Porto Alegre	"Sem Radar"	—	—	✔	—
4	Kynnie Williams	21	Macaé	"Why Don't You Love Me"	—	—	✔	✔
5	Nanda Torres	37	Rio de Janeiro	"Começar de Novo"	—	—	—	—
6	Vanessa Borges	23	Salvador	"Muito Obrigado Axé"	✔	—	✔	✔
7	Kall Medrado	29	Salvador	"You Make Me Feel Like"	✔	✔	✔	✔
8	Joey Mattos	26	Guarulhos	"Domingo"	✔	✔	✔	✔
9	Edmon Matos	49	Rio de Janeiro	"Samba de Verão"	✔	✔	—	—
10	Rafaela Melo	23	Ruy Barbosa	"Flor da Pele"	—	—	✔	—
11	Vinícius Zanin	30	Rolândia	"Seven Nation Army"	✔	—	—	—

=== Episode 4 ===
Aired: October 16, 2014

- Coach performance: Carlinhos Brown ("Verdade, Uma Ilusão")

Order	Artist	Age	Hometown	Song	Coach's and contestant's choices			
Order	Artist	Age	Hometown	Song	Claudia	Lulu	Daniel	Brown
1	Rose Oliver	27	Rio de Janeiro	"Aquarela do Brasil"	✔	✔	✔	✔
2	Leandro Buenno	21	São Paulo	"Latch"	✔	✔	✔	—
3	Marina Saru	17	Sarzedo	"Eu Sei"	—	—	—	—
4	Luana Fernandes	19	Ipatinga	"Feeling Good"	✔	—	✔	—
5	Nanda Garcia	29	Niterói	"Gente Humilde"	—	—	✔	✔
6	Jésus Henrique	29	Itabira	"Serrado"	✔	—	✔	—
7	Débora Coutinho	20	Fortaleza	"The House of..."	—	—	✔	✔
8	Karina Duque Estrada	28	Rio de Janeiro	"Um Sorriso Nos Lábios"	✔	—	—	—
9	Thiago Soares	27	S. Luiz Gonzaga	"Simples Desejo"	—	—	✔	—
10	Lui Medeiros	25	Rio de Janeiro	"Drão"	✔	✔	✔	✔
11	Amanda Mangia	17	Barra Mansa	"Forget You"	—	—	—	—
12	Thiago Costa	27	São Paulo	"Colombina"	✔	—	✔	—

=== Episode 5 ===
Aired: October 23, 2014

- Coach performance: Lulu Santos ("Luiz Maurício")

Order	Artist	Age	Hometown	Song	Coach's and contestant's choices			
Order	Artist	Age	Hometown	Song	Claudia	Lulu	Daniel	Brown
1	Davi Lins	27	Rio de Janeiro	"Mais Fácil"	✔	—	✔	✔
2	Franciele Karen	16	Congonhas	"She Wolf"	—	—	—	—
3	Dilauri	24	Fortaleza	"Tá Vendo Aquela Lua"	✔	—	—	✔
4	Maria Alice	28	Ibiporã	"You Oughta Know"	✔	✔	✔	—
5	Ricardo Diniz	38	Niterói	"Espelhos D'Água"	✔	—	✔	✔
6	Paulo Soares	27	Uberaba	"Far Away"	✔	✔	✔	—
7	Nonô Lellis	16	São Paulo	"Fighter"	✔	—N/a	—	✔
8	Gabi D'Paula	24	Rio de Janeiro	"Num Corpo Só"	—	—N/a	—	—
9	Millane Hora	31	Maceió	"Something's Got a..."	✔	—N/a	✔	✔
10	Flavinha & Léo	23–26	São Paulo	"Just a Fool"	—N/a	—N/a	✔	—
11	Kadu Vianna	34	Belo Horizonte	"Amor de Índio"	—N/a	—N/a	✔	✔
12	Paula Marchesini	32	São Paulo	"The Best"	—N/a	—N/a	—N/a	✔

== The Battle rounds ==
Coaches' advisors
Claudia Leitte	Lulu Santos	Daniel	Carlinhos Brown
Dudu Nobre	Di Ferrero	Luiza Possi	Rogerio Flausino

Color key

Artist won the Battle and advances to the Live shows
Artist lost the Battle but was stolen by another coach and advances to the Live shows
Artist lost the Battle and was eliminated

=== Episode 6 ===
Aired: October 30, 2014

- Group performance: The Voice Brasil Coaches ("A Namorada")

Order	Coach	Winner	Song	Loser	Steal result			
Order	Coach	Winner	Song	Loser	Claudia	Lulu	Daniel	Brown
1	Daniel	Vitor & Vanuti	"Domingo de Manhã"	Danilo Reis & Rafael	✔	✔	—N/a	—
2	Lulu	Maria Alice	"Bang Bang"	Mariana Mira	—	—N/a	—	—
3	Claudia	Nise Palhares	"Adivinha O Quê"	Davi Lins	—N/a	—	—	—
3	Claudia	Nise Palhares	"Adivinha O Quê"	Thiago Costa	—N/a	✔	✔	—
4	Lulu	Edu Camargo	"Eu Sei Que Vou Te Amar"	Rose Oliver	✔	—N/a	✔	✔
5	Brown	Romero Ribeiro	"Maluca Pirada"	Dilauri	—	—	—	—N/a
6	Lulu	Dudu Filleti	"How Can I Go On"	Isadora Morais	—	—N/a	—	✔
7	Brown	Joey Matos	"Réu Confesso"	Leticia Pedroza	—	—	—	—N/a
8	Daniel	Ricardo Diniz	"Haven't Met You Yet"	Kadu Vianna	—	—	—N/a	—N/a

=== Episode 7 ===
Aired: November 6, 2014

- Guest performances: Di Ferrero & Rogério Flausino ("Só Rezo"), Dudu Nobre & Luiza Possi ("Maneiras")

Order	Coach	Winner	Song	Loser	Steal result			
Order	Coach	Winner	Song	Loser	Claudia	Lulu	Daniel	Brown
1	Claudia	Priscila Brenner	"Let It Go"	Nonô Lellis	—N/a	✔	—	—N/a
2	Daniel	Carla Casarim	"Ponteio"	Livia Itaborahy	—	—N/a	—N/a	—N/a
2	Daniel	Carla Casarim	"Ponteio"	Nanda Garcia	—	—N/a	—N/a	—N/a
3	Daniel	Kim Lírio	"With or Without You"	Thiago Soares	—	—N/a	—N/a	—N/a
4	Brown	Princess La Tremenda	"Livin' la Vida Loca"	Kynnie Williams	—	—N/a	✔	—N/a
5	Brown	Vanessa Borges	"Não Precisa Mudar"	Amarildo Fire	✔	—N/a	—N/a	—N/a
6	Claudia	Kall Medrado	"Ficar com Você"	Bruna Tatto	—N/a	—N/a	—N/a	—N/a
7	Lulu	Deena Love	"Lately"	Lui Medeiros	✔	—N/a	—N/a	—N/a

=== Episode 8 ===
Aired: November 13, 2014

- Guest performances: Dudu Nobre & Rogério Flausino ("Verdade"), Di Ferrero & Luiza Possi ("Lucky")

Order	Coach	Winner	Song	Loser	Steal result			
Order	Coach	Winner	Song	Loser	Claudia	Lulu	Daniel	Brown
1	Lulu	Gabriel Silva	"Ain't No Sunshine"	Edmon Costa	—N/a	—N/a	—N/a	—N/a
2	Daniel	Jésus Henrique	"Lindo Lago do Amor"	Rafaela Melo	—N/a	—N/a	—N/a	—N/a
3	Claudia	Leandro Buenno	"Counting Stars"	Vinícius Zanin	—N/a	—N/a	—N/a	—N/a
4	Daniel	Kiko & Jeanne	"Não Precisa"	Flavinha & Léo	—N/a	—N/a	—N/a	—N/a
5	Lulu	Twyla	"Ilegal, Imoral ou Engorda"	Paulo Soares	—N/a	—N/a	—N/a	—N/a
6	Claudia	Millane Hora	"Bilhete"	Karina Duque Estrada	—N/a	—N/a	—N/a	—N/a
7	Brown	Hellen Lyu	"Freedom"	Débora Coutinho	—N/a	—N/a	—N/a	—N/a
8	Claudia	Nathalie Alvim	"Roxanne"	Luana Fernandes	—N/a	—N/a	—N/a	—N/a
9	Brown	Paula Marchesini	"Será"	Ricardo & Ronael	—N/a	—N/a	—N/a	—N/a

== Live shows ==
The live shows is the final phase of the competition. It consists of the playoffs, three weekly shows and the season finale.

Viewers in the Amazon time zone (Acre, Amazonas, Rondônia and Roraima) are cued to vote to save artists on the show's official website during the delayed broadcast.

Artist's info

- Artist from Team Claudia
- Artist from Team Lulu
- Artist from Team Daniel
- Artist from Team Brown

Result details

- Artist was the winner
- Artist was the runner-up
- Artist did not perform on that particular week
- Artist advanced on public's vote
- Artist was part of the team's bottom three or two
- Artist was eliminated
- Artist advanced to the finals
- Artist received the fewest points and was eliminated

Live show results per week
Artist	Week 1	Week 2	Week 3	Week 4	Week 5	Finals
Danilo Reis & Rafael	Safe		Bottom three	Bottom two	Advanced	Winner
Kim Lírio	Safe		Safe	Safe	Advanced	Runner-up
Lui Medeiros	Safe		Bottom three	Bottom two	Advanced	Runner-up
Romero Ribeiro	Safe		Safe	Safe	Advanced	Runner-up
Nonô Lellis		Safe	Safe	Safe	Eliminated	Eliminated (week 5)
Jesus Henrique	Safe		Bottom three	Bottom two	Eliminated	Eliminated (week 5)
Leandro Buenno	Safe		Safe	Safe	Eliminated	Eliminated (week 5)
Rose Oliver	Safe		Bottom three	Bottom two	Eliminated	Eliminated (week 5)
Nise Palhares		Safe	Bottom three	Eliminated	Eliminated (week 4)	
Edu Camargo	Safe		Bottom three	Eliminated	Eliminated (week 4)	
Joey Mattos		Safe	Bottom three	Eliminated	Eliminated (week 4)	
Vitor & Vanuti		Safe	Bottom three	Eliminated	Eliminated (week 4)	
Maria Alice		Safe	Eliminated	Eliminated (week 3)		
Carla Casarim		Safe	Eliminated	Eliminated (week 3)		
Kall Medrado		Safe	Eliminated	Eliminated (week 3)		
Paula Marchesini		Safe	Eliminated	Eliminated (week 3)		
Amarildo Fire		Eliminated	Eliminated (week 2)			
Nathalie Alvim		Eliminated	Eliminated (week 2)			
Deena Love		Eliminated	Eliminated (week 2)			
Gabriel Silva		Eliminated	Eliminated (week 2)			
Kynnie Williams		Eliminated	Eliminated (week 2)			
Thiago Costa		Eliminated	Eliminated (week 2)			
Isadora Morais		Eliminated	Eliminated (week 2)			
Princess La Tremenda		Eliminated	Eliminated (week 2)			
Dudu Fileti	Eliminated	Eliminated (week 1)				
Twyla	Eliminated	Eliminated (week 1)				
Hellen Lyu	Eliminated	Eliminated (week 1)				
Vanessa Borges	Eliminated	Eliminated (week 1)				
Millane Hora	Eliminated	Eliminated (week 1)				
Priscila Brenner	Eliminated	Eliminated (week 1)				
Kiko & Jeanne	Eliminated	Eliminated (week 1)				
Ricardo Diniz	Eliminated	Eliminated (week 1)				

Color key:

Artist was saved by the Public's votes
Artist was saved by his/her coach or was placed in the bottom three
Artist was eliminated

=== Episode 9 ===
Aired: November 20, 2014

Live Playoffs 1

Order	Coach	Artist	Song	Result
1	Daniel	Jésus Henrique	"Lilás"	Coach's choice
2	Daniel	Kim Lírio	"Dream On"	46% (out of 4)
3	Daniel	Kiko & Jeanne	"Sapato Velho"	Eliminated
4	Daniel	Ricardo Diniz	"Caça e Caçador"	Eliminated
5	Claudia	Leandro Buenno	"Without You"	Coach's choice
6	Claudia	Lui Medeiros	"Oceano"	29% (out of 4)
7	Claudia	Millane Hora	"Vapor Barato"	Eliminated
8	Claudia	Priscila Brenner	"Burn"	Eliminated
9	Brown	Hellen Lyu	"Marcas de Ayer"	Eliminated
10	Brown	Romero Ribeiro	"Depois do Prazer"	28% (out of 4)
11	Brown	Rose Oliver	"Força Estranha"	Coach's choice
12	Brown	Vanessa Borges	"Amantes Cinzas"	Eliminated
13	Lulu	Danilo Reis & Rafael	"Planeta Água"	41% (out of 4)
14	Lulu	Dudu Fileti	"Every Breath You Take"	Eliminated
15	Lulu	Edu Camargo	"Lábios de Mel"	Coach's choice
16	Lulu	Twyla	"Unchain My Heart"	Eliminated

=== Episode 10 ===
Aired: November 27, 2014

Live Playoffs 2

Order	Coach	Artist	Song	Result
1	Brown	Isadora Morais	"A Dança da Solidão"	Eliminated
2	Brown	Joey Mattos	"Mangueira"	44% (out of 4)
3	Brown	Paula Marchesini	"Esse Tal de Rock n'Roll"	Coach's choice
4	Brown	Princess La Tremenda	"Summertime"	Eliminated
5	Daniel	Carla Casarim	"Upa Neguinho"	Coach's choice
6	Daniel	Kynnie Williams	"All of Me"	Eliminated
7	Daniel	Thiago Costa	"Como Vai Você"	Eliminated
8	Daniel	Vitor & Vanuti	"A Hora É Agora"	34% (out of 4)
9	Lulu	Deena Love	"Dois pra lá, Dois pra cá"	Eliminated
10	Lulu	Gabriel Silva	"I Still Haven't Found..."	Eliminated
11	Lulu	Maria Alice	"Memórias"	Coach's choice
12	Lulu	Nonô Lellis	"Breakaway"	59% (out of 4)
13	Claudia	Amarildo Fire	"Samurai"	Eliminated
14	Claudia	Kall Medrado	"Fallin'"	Coach's choice
15	Claudia	Nathalie Alvim	"What's Up?"	Eliminated
16	Claudia	Nise Palhares	"Pra Você"	30% (out of 4)

=== Episode 11 ===
Aired: December 4, 2014

Round of 16

Order	Coach	Artist	Song	Result
1	Brown	Joey Mattos	"Too Young To Die"	Coach's choice
2	Brown	Paula Marchesini	"Vou Deixar"	Eliminated
3	Brown	Romero Ribeiro	"Caraca, Muleke"	36% (out of 4)
4	Brown	Rose Oliver	"Maria de Verdade"	Coach's choice
5	Claudia	Kall Medrado	"Happy"	Eliminated
6	Claudia	Leandro Buenno	"Stay"	46% (out of 4)
7	Claudia	Lui Medeiros	"Bad Girl" / "Wonderful"	Coach's choice
8	Claudia	Nise Palhares	"Do Seu Lado"	Coach's choice
9	Daniel	Carla Casarim	"Atrás da Porta"	Eliminated
10	Daniel	Jésus Henrique	"Metamorfose Ambulante"	Coach's choice
11	Daniel	Kim Lírio	"À Sua Maneira"	39% (out of 4)
12	Daniel	Vitor & Vanuti	"Receita de Amar"	Coach's choice
13	Lulu	Danilo Reis & Rafael	"Romaria"	Coach's choice
14	Lulu	Edu Camargo	"Amor Perfeito"	Coach's choice
15	Lulu	Maria Alice	"Problem"	Eliminated
16	Lulu	Nonô Lellis	"Crazy in Love"	52% (out of 4)

=== Episode 12 ===
Aired: December 11, 2014

Quarterfinals

- Coach performance: Lulu Santos ft. Mr. Catra ("Michê"), Carlinhos Brown ft. Luiz Caldas ("Por Causa de Você")

Order	Coach	Artist	Song	Result
1	Daniel	Jésus Henrique	"Palco"	Coach's choice
2	Daniel	Kim Lírio	"Iris"	49% (out of 3)
3	Daniel	Vitor & Vanuti	"Se Deus Me Ouvisse"	Eliminated
4	Brown	Joey Mattos	"Conversa de Botequim"	Eliminated
5	Brown	Romero Ribeiro	"Mineirinho"	41% (out of 3)
6	Brown	Rose Oliver	"A Voz do Morro"	Coach's choice
7	Lulu	Danilo Reis & Rafael	"Pagode" / "Chora Viola"	Coach's choice
8	Lulu	Edu Camargo	"As Dores do Mundo"	Eliminated
9	Lulu	Nonô Lellis	"De Repente Califórnia"	57% (out of 3)
10	Claudia	Leandro Buenno	"Love Runs Out"	53% (out of 3)
11	Claudia	Lui Medeiros	"The Long and Winding Road"	Coach's choice
12	Claudia	Nise Palhares	"De Janeiro a Janeiro"	Eliminated

=== Episode 13 ===
Aired: December 18, 2014

Semifinals

- Coach performance: Daniel ft. Guilherme Arantes ("Meu Mundo e Nada Mais"), Claudia Leitte ft. MC Guimê (Matimba")

Order	Coach	Artist	Song	Points		
Order	Coach	Artist	Song	Coach	Public	Total
1	Brown	Romero Ribeiro	"Assim Você Mata o Papai"	15	58	73
2	Brown	Rose Oliver	"Lanterna dos Afogados"	15	42	57
3	Claudia	Leandro Buenno	"Animals"	15	45	60
4	Claudia	Lui Medeiros	"Love Never Felt So Good"	15	55	70
5	Daniel	Jésus Henrique	"Final Feliz"	15	41	56
6	Daniel	Kim Lírio	"How You Remind Me"	15	59	74
7	Lulu	Danilo Reis & Rafael	"Pra Dizer Adeus"	15	52	67
8	Lulu	Nonô Lellis	"The Climb"	15	48	63

=== Episode 14 ===
Episode	Coach	Artist	Order	Solo song	Order	Duet with Coach	Result
Episode 14 (December 25)
Episode 14 (December 25)	Lulu Santos	Danilo Reis & Rafael	8	"Dois Rios"	6	"Como Uma Onda" (ft. Di Ferrero)	Winner (43%)
Episode 14 (December 25)	Daniel	Kim Lírio	4	"Ideologia"	2	"Amor Pra Recomeçar" (ft. Luiza Possi & Rogério Flausino)	Runner-up
Episode 14 (December 25)	Claudia Leitte	Lui Medeiros	1	"Um Dia, Um Adeus"	7	"Smooth" (ft. Pepeu Gomes)	Runner-up
Episode 14 (December 25)	Carlinhos Brown	Romero Ribeiro	5	"Sou o Cara Pra Você"	3	"Deixa a Vida Me Levar" (ft. Dudu Nobre)	Runner-up

== Ratings ==
=== Brazilian ratings ===
All numbers are in points and provided by IBOPE.

Week	Episode	Air Date	Viewers (points)	Rank Timeslot	Source
1	The Blind Auditions 1	September 18, 2014	21.1	1	
2	The Blind Auditions 2	September 25, 2014	22.0	1	
3	The Blind Auditions 3	October 9, 2014	22.1	1	
4	The Blind Auditions 4	October 16, 2014	22.3	1	
5	The Blind Auditions 5	October 23, 2014	23.5	1	
6	The Battles 1	October 30, 2014	23.6	1	
7	The Battles 2	November 6, 2014	23.4	1	
8	The Battles 3	November 13, 2014	21.7	1	
9	The Live Playoffs 1	November 20, 2014	21.0	1	
10	The Live Playoffs 2	November 27, 2014	21.5	1	
11	Round of 16	December 4, 2014	22.7	1	
12	Quarterfinals	December 11, 2014	20.7	1	
13	Semifinals	December 18, 2014	22.0	1	
14	Final	December 25, 2014	22.0	1	

- In 2014, each point represents 65.000 households in São Paulo.

Notes

- Episode 5 was delayed 1-hour in 13 states + Federal District due to the second round of Governor's debate on Globo and affiliates in these regions.
