= Bru-C =

British rapper (born 1991)

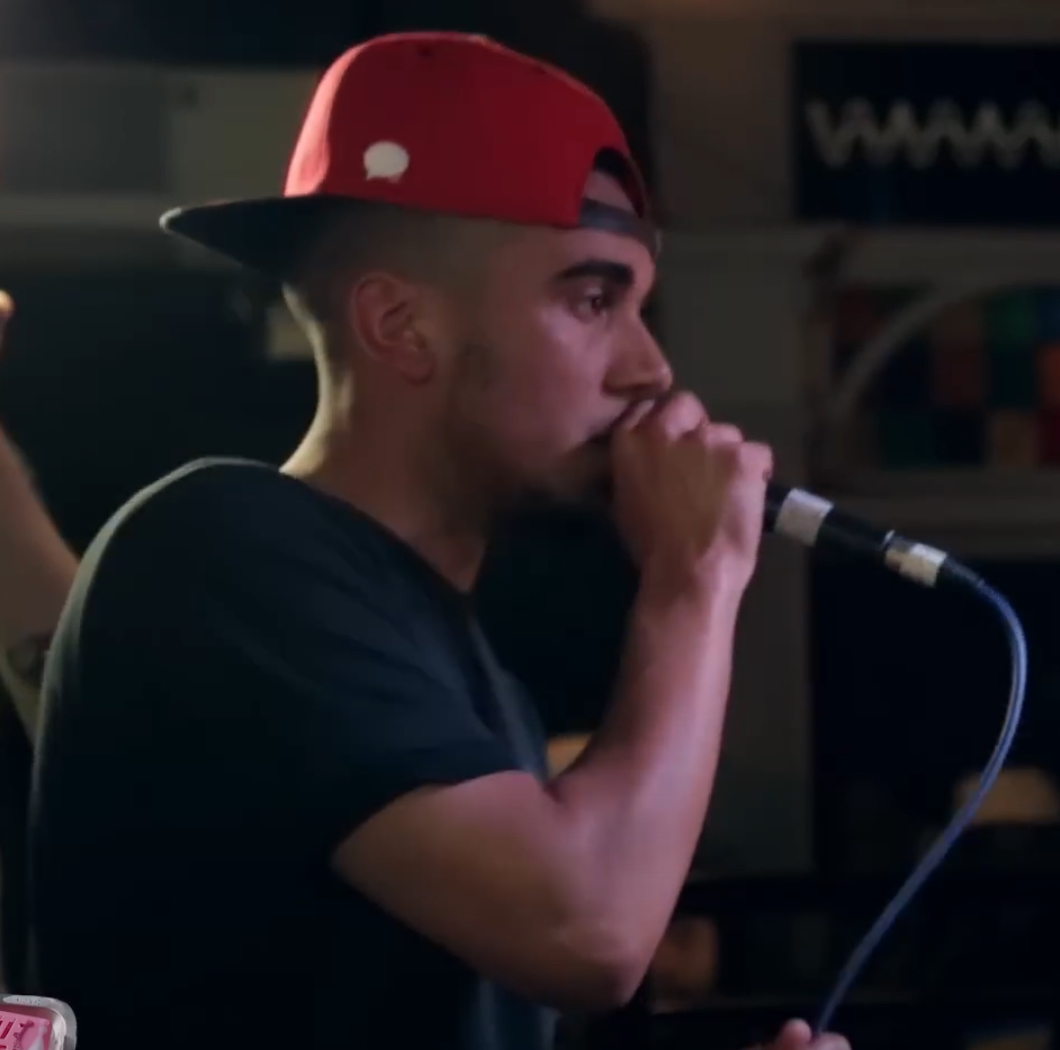
- Bru-C in 2015
- Born: Josh Bruce; 28 June 1991 (age 35); Long Eaton, Derbyshire, England
- Occupation: Rapper
- Years active: 2011–present
- Children: 1
- Website: bru-c.com

Josh Bruce (born 28 June 1991), professionally known as Bru-C, is an English rapper from Long Eaton, Derbyshire, but now based in Nottingham. His debut album Original Sounds was released in November 2019 with CruCast, which was his record label at the time. His second album Smile was released in December 2020. In December 2021, Bru-C signed a contract to join the major record label Def Jam Recordings.

== Discography ==
=== Albums ===
List of albums, with selected details
Title	Details
Original Sounds	Released: November 22, 2019; Label: Crucast; Format: streaming, digital download
Smile	Released: December 4, 2020; Label: Bru-C Music; Format: streaming, digital download
Family Only	Released: June 14, 2024; Label: 0207 Def Jam; Format: streaming, digital download

=== Extended plays ===
List of EPs, with selected details
Title	Details
Black 'N Red	Released: June 27, 2015; Label: Phlexx; Format: streaming, digital download

=== Singles ===
List of singles, with selected peak chart positions
Title	Year	Peak chart positions		Certifications	Album
Title	Year	UK	NZ Hot	Certifications	Album
"Dead You" (with Tsuki)	2019	—	—		Non-album single
"You & I" (with Simula)	2019	—	—	BPI: Platinum	Original Sounds
"Motives"	2019	—	—		Non-album single
"Inhaler"	2019	—	—		Original Sounds
"Sunrise" (featuring Chromatic)	2019	—	—		Original Sounds
"Life" (with Shapes)	2020	—	—		Smile
"Inhaler Part 2"	2020	—	—		Non-album single
"Mission"	2020	—	—		Smile
"Take Control"	2021	—	—		Non-album singles
"Streetside" (with Bou)	2021	84	—	BPI: Gold	Non-album singles
"Freedom"	2021	—	—	BPI: Silver	Non-album singles
"Mesmerised"	2021	—	—	BPI: Silver	Non-album singles
"Dutty" (with Tsuki)	2021	—	—		Non-album singles
"Paradise" (featuring Wilkinson)	2022	—	—	BPI: Silver	Non-album singles
"No Excuses" (with Shapes)	2022	14	—	BPI: Platinum	Non-album singles
"Playground"	2022	—	—		Non-album singles
"Say No More" (with Shapes and Sonny Fodera)	2022	85	—		Non-album singles
"Oh Baby" (with Nathan Dawe featuring bshp and Issey Cross)	2023	35	—	BPI: Silver	If Heaven Had a Phone Line
"TMO (Turn Me On)" (with Luude featuring Kevin Lyttle)	2023	42	—		Non-album singles
"Differently" (featuring Mist)	2023	—	—		Non-album singles
"Let It Go" (with Shapes)	2024	—	—		Non-album singles
"Wild"	2024	—	—		Non-album singles
"Ten Toes" (featuring MC Spyda, General Levy and Eksman)	2024	—	32		Non-album singles
"—" denotes a recording that did not chart or was not released in that territory.
