= Beth McCarthy (singer) =

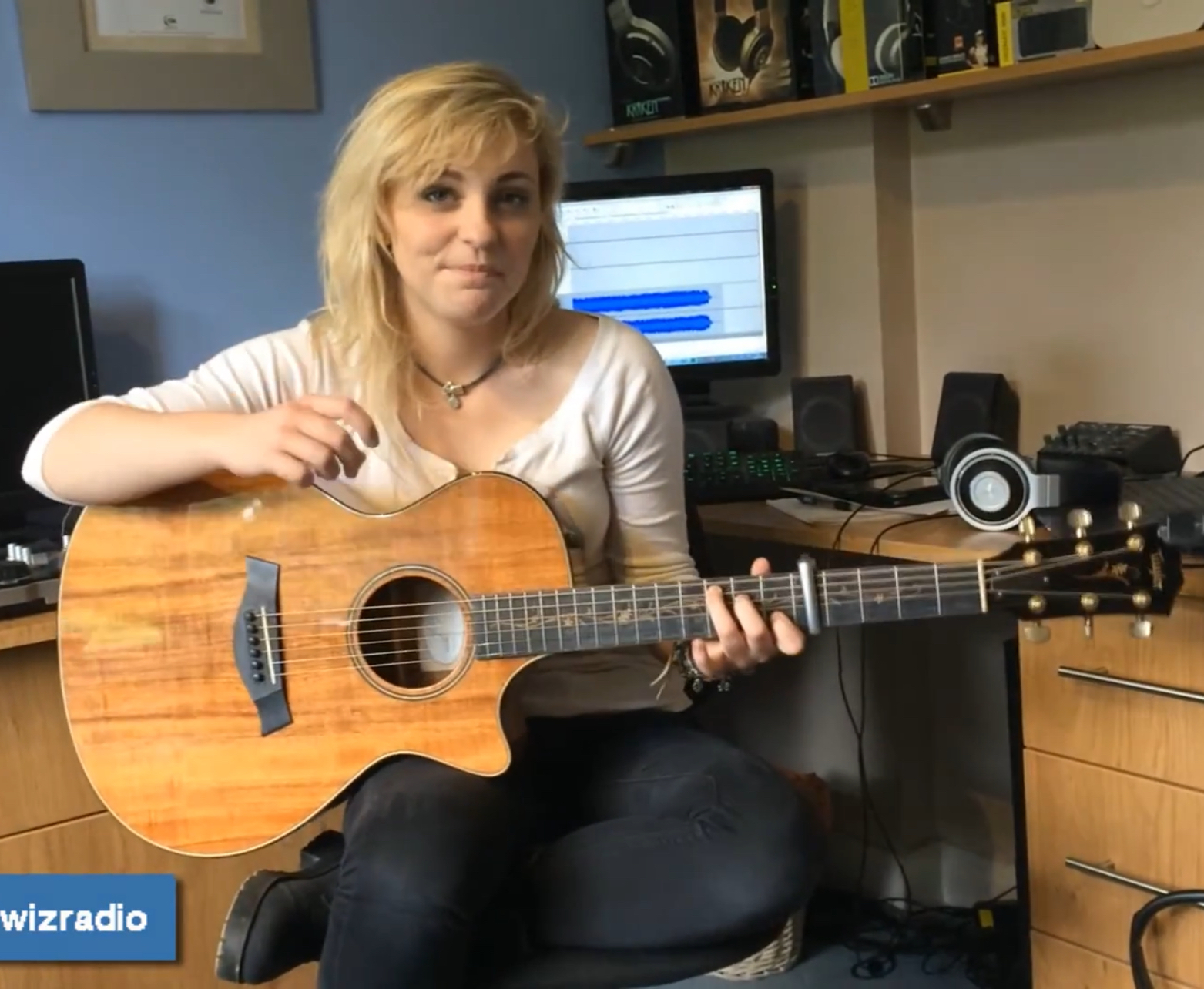
- McCarthy in 2014

Background information
- Born: Bethany May McCarthy; 23 June 1997 (age 29); York, England
- Genres: Pop rock; synth pop; country/folk pop; acoustic
- Instruments: Vocals; guitar
- Years active: 2010–present
- Labels: Soho Songs; Ont' Sofa Records; LAB Records
- Website: bethmccarthymusic.com

Bethany May McCarthy (born 23 June 1997) is an English singer-songwriter, guitarist and presenter. After self-releasing an EP, at age 16, she (Note: McCarthy uses she/her and they/them pronouns.) competed in the third series of The Voice UK (2014). She has since gained prominence as a solo artist.

== Early life ==
McCarthy was born in York and grew up in the suburb of Rawcliffe. She is the daughter of a dentist and a hygienist. McCarthy attended the Mount School. She studied music at the local Access to Music college in The Groves.

== Career ==
=== Music ===
At age 13, McCarthy began busking in St Helen's Square. She self-released her first single "Hero" in 2012 followed by her debut EP Northern Light in 2013.

In 2014 at age 16, McCarthy competed in the third series of The Voice UK, auditioning with an acoustic cover of LMFAO's "Sexy and I Know It" to a yes from Ricky Wilson. McCarthy was eliminated in the knockouts. That year, she performed at Live at Leeds.

McCarthy contributed a "Streets of London" cover to the 100 Streets (2016) film soundtrack. She performed at the Tramlines Festival. Her January 2017 single "Pretty Lies" reached #2 on the iTunes singer-songwriter chart, She also released a charity single "Lemonade" as well as "Mr & Mrs Brown". She embarked on a headline tour called the Outline Tour.

In 2018, McCarthy released the singles "Shame", "Crazy for You" and "Wildfire" ahead of her 2019 EP Self Portrait.

McCarthy began making reworkings of songs. She posted a TikTok in 2020 reworking Will Joseph Cook's "Be Around Me", which became a single "Omg Did She Call Him Baby?". She gained further viral prominence with the 2021 single "She Gets the Flowers". This was followed by the singles "If You Loved Me Right", "Friendship Bracelet" in 2021 and "No Hard Feelings" in 2022. She performed at Liverpool Sound City and the Great Escape Festival.

In 2023, McCarthy supported Emlyn's No One Came to Grieve Tour and Ellie Dixon's In Case of Emergency Tour and returned to the Great Escape Festival. She released the singles "What Do You Call It?", "She's Pretty" and the titular track ahead of her 2024 third EP IDK How to Talk to Girls. Another single was "Good Bi". She embarked on a headline IDK How to Talk to Girls Tour supported by Catty, Nxdia, Go-Jo and Carla Wehbe. In addition, McCarthy supported Caity Baser's Still Learning Tour and performed at Live at Leeds, Radio 1's Big Weekend, Mighty Hoopla, Rock for People, Pinkpop Festival, Kendal Calling and FM4 Frequency Festival.

McCarthy's fourth EP Hot and Stupid followed the next year in 2025. Singles from the release were "All My Friends Are Hot" and the titular track. Other singles she released were "Treat Me Like a Rockstar", "What If I Never Make It?", "Drama at the Disco", "Exes in Bedsheets" and "How Am I Supposed to Love Myself?". McCarthy performed at Glastonbury Festival and Boardmasters Festival and embarked on a headline Hot & Stupid Tour supported by Aleksiah and Catty. McCarthy also supported G Flip on tour.

She is attached to perform at the 2026 Reading and Leeds Festivals. In 2026, McCarthy deleted all posts on her social media pages in preparation for her single "Pretty Villain", and the start of a new era. She released the next single "The Love After The Love Of Your Life" that October.

=== Presenting ===
From 2018 to 2021, McCarthy was a Monday evening and later Thursday night presenter on BBC Radio York.

== Artistry ==
Through her father, McCarthy grew up listening to AC/DC, Meat Loaf, Deep Purple and Queen. Her initial sound was country folk influenced pop before moving towards a more electronic/synth and then pop rock sound. McCarthy's early influences included Max Milner, Ed Sheeran, Ellie Goulding, Damien Rice, The Script, Gabrielle Aplin and Taylor Swift. In 2024, McCarthy mentioned Avril Lavigne, Michelle Branch, P!nk and Carly Rae Jepsen as influences.

== Personal life ==
McCarthy is bisexual.

== Discography ==
=== EPs ===
- Northern Light (2013)
- Self Portrait (2019)
- IDK How to Talk to Girls (2024)
- Hot and Stupid (2025)
- The Origin Story of a Pretty Villain (2026)

=== Singles ===
- "Hero" (2012)
- "Left Behind" (2016)
- "Streets of London" (2016), cover
- "Pretty Lies" (2017)
- "Lemonade" (2017)
- "Mr & Mrs Brown" (2017)
- "Shame" (2018)
- "Crazy for You" (2018)
- "Wildfire" (2019)
- "Omg Did She Call Him Baby?" (2020)
- "She Gets the Flowers" (2021)
- "If You Loved Me Right" (2021)
- "Friendship Bracelet" (2021)
- "No Hard Feelings" (2022)
- "What Do You Call It?" (2023)
- "She's Pretty" (2023)
- "IDK How to Talk to Girls" (2024)
- "Good Bi" (2024)
- "All My Friends Are Hot" (2024)
- "Hot and Stupid" (2025)
- "Treat Me Like a Rockstar" (2025)
- "What If I Never Make It?" (2025)
- "Drama at the Disco" (2025)
- "Exes in Bedsheets" (2025)
- "How Am I Supposed to Love Myself" (2025)
- "Hey Handsome" (2026)
- "Pretty Villain" (2026)
- "The Love After the Love of Your Life" (2026)
