= The Wedding Video (2012 film) =

- Directed by: Nigel Cole
- Written by: Tim Firth
- Produced by: James Gay-Rees
- Starring: Rufus Hound; Lucy Punch; Robert Webb
- Cinematography: Simon Tindall
- Edited by: Laura Morrod
- Production companies: Squirrel Films; Timeless Films
- Distributed by: Entertainment Film Distributors
- Release date: 17 August 2012
- Running time: 94 minutes
- Country: United Kingdom
- Language: English
- Box office: £1.1 million

The Wedding Video is a 2012 British comedy film directed by Nigel Cole and written by Tim Firth. Presented in the "found footage" style, the film stars Rufus Hound, Lucy Punch and Robert Webb. It follows an engaged couple's best man as he creates a video documentary of their wedding.

== Plot ==
Raif Moyle (Hound) has been chosen to be the best man to his brother Tim (Webb) and Saskia (Punch) at their wedding. Raif decides to give Tim and Saskia an unforgettable present in the form of a wedding video. He discovers that Tim has left his bohemian life behind and is marrying into a family aspirant of a higher-class lifestyle—especially Saskia's hideous Hyacinth Bucket-esque grandmother (Miriam Margolyes).

With the bride's mother interfering with wedding plans (such as arranging horses dressed as unicorns and butterflies to release by the bridesmaids), Raif finds out that Saskia is the rebellious Saskia he knew at school. Spending an increasing amount of time with her during the wedding arrangements, Raif and Saskia kiss after the stress of the planning takes its toll on her. Eventually revealing this to Tim en route to the wedding, they decide to intercept Saskia on her way to the church. Tim asks Saskia whether she really wants the marriage to go ahead; she tearfully says "no". Arriving late to the church, the three make their way up the aisle to the altar, where Tim announces that his and Saskia's wedding will not proceed. However, Raif steps forward and the vicar conducts a brief, but non-legal, ceremony for Raif and Saskia.

At the wedding reception, being held at a grand stately home, Saskia's mother realises that all she wants is for Saskia to be happy.

== Cast ==
- Rufus Hound as Raif Moyle
- Lucy Punch as Saskia
- Robert Webb as Tim Moyle
- Matt Berry as Roger
- Michelle Gomez as The Wedding Planner
- Miriam Margolyes as Patricia
- Harriet Walter as Alex
- Olegar Fedoro as Konstantin
- Geoffrey Newland as Spencer
- Julianne White as Tara Devlin
- Chris Wilson as Mr. Devlin

== Production ==
Filming began in August 2011. The film was recorded at a number of locations, including two National Trust properties, Alderley Edge and Basildon Park, as well as St. Andrew's Church in Sonning, and Chester city centre.

== Reception ==
The film received mixed reviews from critics. It received a "fresh" rating of 67% based on 18 reviews from aggregating site Rotten Tomatoes.

Total Film gave the film 3/5 stars, describing it as "one of Robert Webb's lesser wedding-coms" and suggesting that Webb's performance in 2006 wedding film Confetti was better. Joey Godman, writing for The Upcoming, gave the film 1/5 stars, stating that the plot was simplistic and the jokes "predictable". He praised Hound's realism and the film's easy viewing, but thought that the plot's climax was detached from the majority of the film.

The Guardian wrote the film was "moderately funny", and described Margolyes' and Harriet Walter's characters as "sharp and credible".

In a review for The Independent, Nicholas Barber stated that the upsets and mayhem in the film are "small beer" compared to those in Peep Show, The Worst Week of My Life and Gavin & Stacey. Similarly, Metro wrote that the "irreverent, observational character humour [...] will win lots of laughs from Peep Show fans", and rated the film 3/5 stars. Other three-star reviews came from The Daily Express and The Daily Telegraph.

Anthony Quinn, also writing for The Independent, gave the film 2/5 stars.
