= Sarzedo, Minas Gerais =

Human settlement in Brazil

Coordinates: 20°02′06″S 44°08′42″W

- Municipality
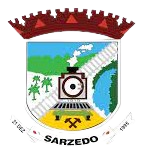
- Coat of arms
- Interactive map of Sarzedo, Minas Gerais
- Country: Brazil
- State: Minas Gerais
- Region: Southeast

Population (2022 Census)
  - Total: 36,844
  - Estimate (2025): 39,974
- Time zone: UTC−3 (BRT)

Location of Sarzedo within Minas Gerais

Sarzedo is a Brazilian municipality located in the state of Minas Gerais. The city belongs to the mesoregion Metropolitana de Belo Horizonte and to the microregion of Belo Horizonte. As of 2025, the estimated population was 39,974.

== See also ==
- List of municipalities in Minas Gerais
