= Luude =

Australian Drum and bass producer

- Born: Christian Benson
- Origin: Tasmania, Australia
- Occupation: Record producer
- Years active: 2015–present
- Labels: Sweat It Out; Warner Music Australia

Christian Benson, known professionally as Luude, is an Australian drum and bass producer. He is best known for his 2021 cover of "Down Under".

He is also half of Australian electronic duo Choomba.

== Life and career ==
Christian Benson was born in Tasmania, Australia, the son of a guitar shredder, Mark. After high school, he relocated to Perth, Western Australia after being inspired by an Avicii YouTube clip encouraged him to try producing.

Luude released his first single in December 2015.

On 3 September 2021, Luude released the EP 6AM.

In 2021, Luude remixed Men at Work's "Down Under" as a drum and bass track. Men at Work's lead singer Colin Hay re-recorded the vocal for the track's official release in November 2021, on the Sweat It Out label. The record made the top ten in Australia and in the United Kingdom and was number one in New Zealand, where by 6 February 2022, it had spent four weeks at the top, twice as many weeks as the original did in 1982.

== Discography ==
=== EPs ===
Title	Details
6AM	Released: 3 September 2021; Label: Sweat It Out, Warner Music Australia; Format: digital download, streaming

=== Singles ===
Title	Year	Chart peak positions			Certifications	Album
Title	Year	AUS	NZ	UK	Certifications	Album
"Coco Butter" (with Twerl)	2015	—	—	—		Non-album singles
"Right Now" (with Fabian Mazur)	2016	—	—	—		Non-album singles
"Sooo"	2016	—	—	—		Non-album singles
"La De Da"	2017	—	—	—		Non-album singles
"Don't Leave Me"	2017	—	—	—		Non-album singles
"Paradise" (with Twerl and Lost Boy)	2017	—	—	—		Non-album singles
"Sink or Swim" (with Example & Georgi Kay)	2018	—	—	—		Non-album singles
"Hurricane" (featuring Great News)	2019	—	—	—		Non-album singles
"Lava Lamp"	2019	—	—	—		Non-album singles
"Luudooskins" (double-A sided single featuring "Arms" and "Butters")	2021	—	—	—		6AM
"Wanna Stay" (featuring Dear Sunday)	2021	—	—	—		6AM
"Down Under" (featuring Colin Hay)	2021	10	1	5	ARIA: 4× Platinum; BPI: 2× Platinum; RMNZ: 5× Platinum	Non-album singles
"Big City Life" (with Mattafix)	2022	55	2	8	ARIA: 2× Platinum; BPI: 2× Platinum; RMNZ: 2× Platinum	Non-album singles
"Oh My" (with Issey Cross featuring Moby)	2023	—	— (Note: "Oh My" did not enter the NZ Top 40 Singles Chart, but peaked at number seven on the NZ Hot Singles Chart.)	98	BPI: Silver; RMNZ: Platinum	Non-album singles
"TMO (Turn Me On)" (with Bru-C featuring Kevin Lyttle)	2023	—	— (Note: "TMO (Turn Me On)" did not enter the NZ Top 40 Singles Chart, but peaked at number three on the NZ Hot Singles Chart.)	42	BPI: Silver	Non-album singles
"Pachamama" (featuring Elliphant)	2024	—	— (Note: "Pachamama" did not enter the NZ Top 40 Singles Chart, but peaked at number 28 on the NZ Hot Singles Chart.)	—	RMNZ: Gold	Non-album singles
"Fun in the Sun" (with Harry Bee)	2024	—	— (Note: "Fun in the Sun" did not enter the NZ Top 40 Singles Chart, but peaked at number 14 on the NZ Hot Singles Chart.)	—		Non-album singles
"96" (with Killowen, Songer, Shapes and Dada Jones)	2024	—	— (Note: "96" did not enter the NZ Top 40 Singles Chart, but peaked at number 22 on the NZ Hot Singles Chart.)	—		Non-album singles
"Darlin'" (with Sean Paul and Brodie)	2025	—	— (Note: "Darlin'" did not enter the NZ Top 40 Singles Chart, but peaked at number 48 on the NZ Hot Singles Chart.)	—		Non-album singles
"Never Adds Up" (featuring Inéz)	2026	—	— (Note: "Never Adds Up" did not enter the NZ Top 40 Singles Chart, but peaked at number 35 on the NZ Hot Singles Chart.)	—		Non-album singles
"Ya Mind" (with Lock n Load and Harry Bee)	2026	—	— (Note: "Ya Mind" did not enter the NZ Top 40 Singles Chart, but peaked at number 25 on the NZ Hot Singles Chart.)	—		Non-album singles
"All We Do Is Dance" (with 1991)	2026	—	—	—		

== Awards and nominations ==
=== ARIA Music Awards ===
The ARIA Music Awards is an annual awards ceremony that recognises excellence, innovation, and achievement across all genres of Australian music. They commenced in 1987.

Year	Nominee / work	Award	Result	Ref.
2022	"Down Under" (featuring Colin Hay)	Michael Gudinski Breakthrough Artist	Nominated	
2022	"Down Under" (featuring Colin Hay)	Best Dance/Electronic Release	Won	
2022	"Down Under" (featuring Colin Hay)	Song of the Year	Nominated	
2022	"Down Under" (featuring Colin Hay) (Luude, Peter Hume)	Best Video	Nominated	
2023	"Big City Life" (with Mattafix)	Song of the Year	Nominated	
