= Nxdia =

Egyptian-British altpop musician (born 2000)

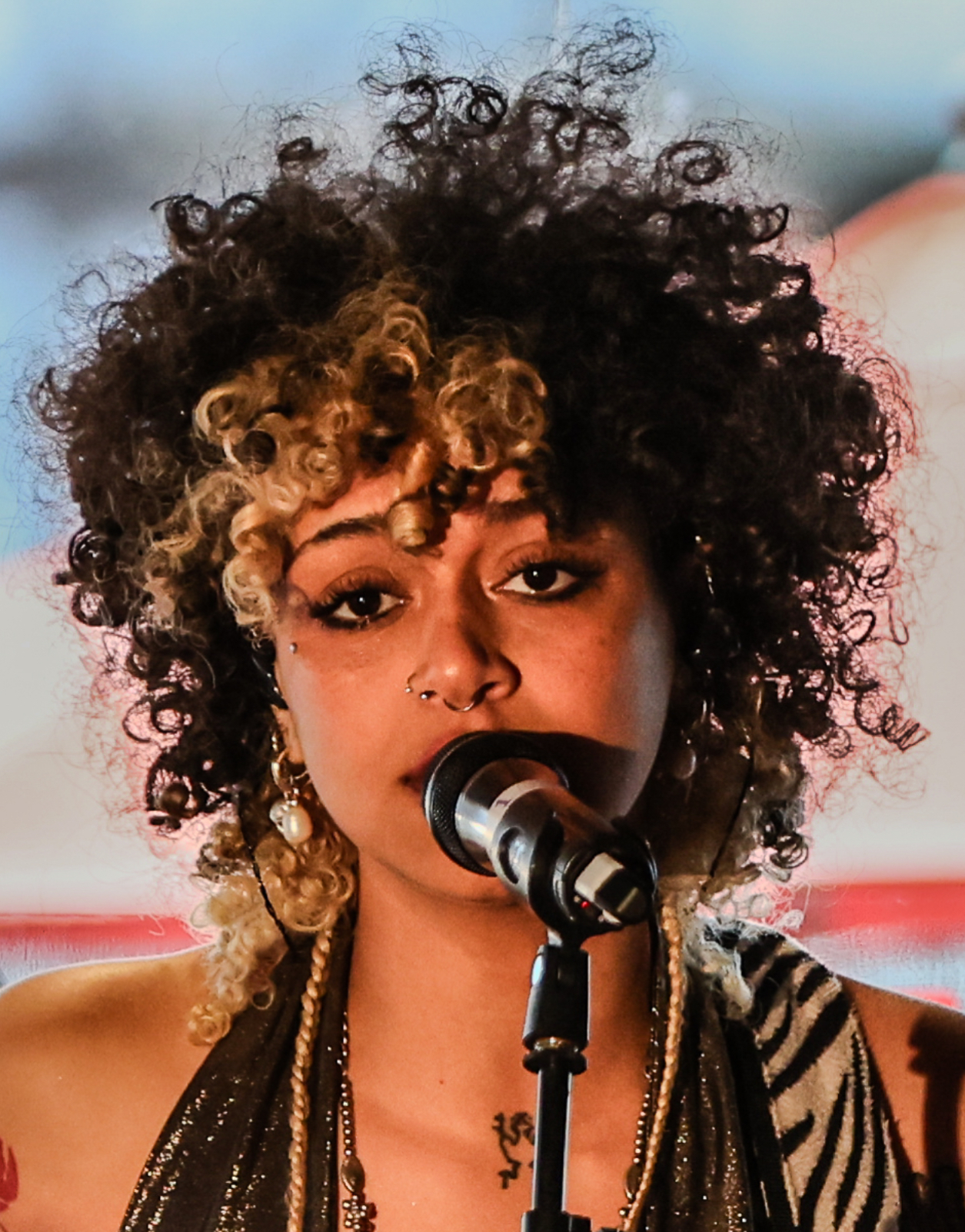
- Nxdia at the 2026 Great Escape Festival

Background information
- Born: Nadia Ahmed; 15 June 2000 (age 26); Heliopolis, Cairo, Egypt
- Origin: Manchester, England
- Genre: Alternative
- Occupation: Musician
- Member of: Loud LDN

Nadia Ahmed (born 15 June 2000), known professionally as Nxdia, is an Egyptian-British alt-pop musician. Born in Heliopolis in Egypt, they (Note: Ahmed is non-binary and uses they/he/she pronouns. This article uses they/them for consistency.) moved to Manchester in England aged eight and began producing their own music after winning a Levis competition and taking a course taught by Everything Everything.

Nxdia released the EP In the Flesh (2023); the single "She Likes a Boy" charted at No. 74 on the UK Singles Sales Chart. Nxdia next released their debut LP I Promise No One's Watching in June 2025 and by August it had amassed over 100 million streams on Spotify. Their music makes regular use of Arabic and English lyrics.

== Personal life & career ==
Nadia Ahmed was born in Cairo on 15 June 2000, and grew up next to Roxy Cinema in Heliopolis. Their grandfather is of Sudanese descent. Their father listened to AC/DC and their mother listened to traditional Arabic acts such as Umm Kulthum, and would take Ahmed to Free Palestine protests from the age of eleven. Their first song was a whimsical track about Hawaii, which they had not yet been to; by nine, their tracks were about identity and self-perception. Nxdia and their family moved to the UK at the age of eight, relocating to Manchester from Egypt; upon arrival, they took up African drumming at a local community centre in Hulme. Their first works were uploaded to YouTube and Instagram, and aged sixteen, they enrolled on Levi Music Project, a two-week group course in which the band Everything Everything taught twelve young people how to produce their own music.

In 2020, they began uploading content to TikTok, including music and discussion of race; by September 2022, they had over 700,000 subscribers on the platform. They released a single, "Ouch!", in 2021, about disappointment with being upset with a friend, followed by the single "Get Between It", released later that year. They released "IDC" in 2023, followed by an EP In the Flesh that August, which dealt with overthinking. After discovering old diary pages which detailed their teenage infatuation for a girl and their disappointment at finding that she was attracted to a boy, they wrote "She Likes a Boy", which made reference to Katy Perry's "Teenage Dream". They began uploading snippets of the song to TikTok in November 2023 and released the track in January 2024; DIY described the track as a "queer anthem", and the following month the track spent a week at No. 74 on the UK Singles Sales Chart. A subsequent track, "Jennifer's Body", described their experience of a toxic relationship, and took its name from the Megan Fox film of the same name on the grounds that watching the film helped them frame their thoughts.

== Artistry ==
In an interview with the Spotlight On podcast in November 2023, Ahmed stated that they listened to My Chemical Romance and Fall Out Boy as a teenager, and that they found Pink's androgynous appearance gamechanging, having discovered her via her music video for "So What". They also mentioned that they were a fan of Hole and the Smashing Pumpkins, and that they spent a period obsessed with a cover version of the traditional Arabic song "Betnadini Tany Leh" by Donia, on the grounds that she had not changed the lyrics from male to female. They also noted in a July 2023 interview with 15questions.net that they also listened to Babymetal and Jon Bellion around this time.

Ahmed told NME in March 2024 that their sound had been inspired by the likes of Paramore, My Chemical Romance, and Simple Plan, and that they took further inspiration from Marina Diamandis's "weirdly operatic" voice and from the bilingualism of Stromae, specifically finding the latter's androgynous appearance in the music video "Tous les mêmes" helpful in discovering their own identity. In an interview with Dork the following month, they cited Paramore, Fall Out Boy, Stromae, and My Chemical Romance for their "big choruses, catchy but often sad lyrics, and driving guitar parts".

Ahmed's music constitutes alt-pop, alternates between English and Arabic, and includes regular vocal runs. They told NME that they sung in Arabic to share the language, as they had previously only used the language to converse with their mother. Ahmed is a member of Loud LDN, a collective of London-based women and genderqueer musicians founded in May 2022.

== Discography ==
Albums

- I Promise No One's Watching (2025)

EPs

- In the Flesh (2023)
- Lovemesick (2026)

Singles

- "Eyes on Me" (2020)
- "Burst (Like a Bubble)" (2020)
- "Get Between It" (2021)
- "Ouch" (2021)
- "What's It Like" (2023)
- "Dopamine" (2023)
- "IDC" (2023)
- "She Likes a Boy" (2024)
- "Jennifer's Body" (2024)
- "Feel Anything" (2024)
- "Boy Clothes" (2025)
- "More!" (2025)
- "Cool" (2026)
