= Ur Mum =

Single by Wet Leg

from the album Wet Leg
- Released: 4 April 2022
- Studio: Dan Carey's studio
- Genre: Surf rock
- Length: 3:21
- Songwriter: Rhian Teasdale
- Producer: Dan Carey

Wet Leg singles chronology
"Angelica" (2022)	"Ur Mum" (2022)	"Catch These Fists" (2025)

Music video
- "Ur Mum" music video on YouTube

"Ur Mum" is a 2022 single by Wet Leg. Released on 4 April 2022 as the last single from their debut album Wet Leg, the song is a diatribe directed at an ex-boyfriend and his mother, and received positive critical reception, particularly for its lyrical content and for its eleven-second scream and countdown to. It charted at No. 46 on the UK Independent Singles Chart, and was rated by Consequence as the 50th best song of 2022. It has also been performed several times in concerts.

== Background and composition ==
On 2 September 2018, Rhian Teasdale sat on a ferris wheel at that year's End of the Road Festival with Hester Chambers, whom she had met before at Platform One College of Music on the Isle of Wight; Chambers had previously played guitar on Teasdale's works, and Teasdale had previously played piano on Chambers's. Teasdale and Chambers formed Wet Leg while on the ferris wheel, naming the band after closing their eyes, shuffling through emoji combinations, and coming across one that happened to be a local term for an overner. They recorded their eponymous debut album in full, released a single, "Chaise Longue", and then released another single, "Wet Dream". On 29 November 2021, they released the double A-side "Too Late Now/Oh No" and announced that they would release their eponymous debut album on 8 April 2022. They then released "Angelica", a song named after Teasdale's oldest friend. Their entire debut album was recorded at Dan Carey's studio in London, with the exception of "Chaise Longue" and "Angelica".

At 6pm on 4 April 2022, they released "Ur Mum", a surf-rock inspired diss track, which Teasdale wrote the evening after a day off from working as a wardrobe assistant, where she was working on a fast food advert; she has stated that she wrote it after feeling "pretty angry at the way things had gone", that she wrote it to make herself feel better, and that doing so worked. The song takes its title from the insult of the same name, fires shots at both the slow pace of rural life and an arrogant ex-boyfriend, and leads with the lyric "When I think about what you've become, I feel sorry for your mum,"; Teasdale later expressed regret at the "very mean" lyric, and in July 2023, Douglas Richards, whose band Plastic Mermaids co-developed Teasdale's 2018 solo single "Solid Gold", used a much-criticised (Note: Far Out and Glamour accused him of misogyny, while the i suggested that Richards' time would be better spent working harder and rebuilding better instead of wasting time "firing shots" at what Teasdale had built and Consequence said that "[t]o paraphrase Teasdale's own words, he seems a bit like a "piece of shit", indeed". In addition, The Forty Five criticised The Times for "gleefully leaning into the narrative that any successful female artist must have been hiding her secret male songwriter all along".) article in The Sunday Times to accuse Teasdale of writing the song about him and his mother, Sue, who had died of cancer in 2013 aged 62, just before he met Teasdale. The song features an 11.02 second scream, inspired by Teasdale's experiences of living above a London branch of the Psychedelic Society that ran scream therapy sessions at 7pm on Tuesdays, and which is preceded by the lyric "Okay, I've been practicing my longest and loudest scream/Okay, here we go/One, two, three…".

== Music video ==
A music video was released for the single. Directed by Lava La Rue, using their alias Lavaland, they have stated that they directed it while finishing their own EP Hi-Fidelity, that it took them a "couple of months" and that they was inspired by spending time including Christmas 2021 living on the Isle of Wight with the band and their eponymous llama, and likened their her time there to an episode of Napoleon Dynamite that had been set on a British Isle. The video contains several references to other Wet Leg songs and in-jokes, and takes place somewhere in the land of Leg. Scotty, played by Tommy Villiers, walks into Angelica's supermarket, while playing "Oh No" on his Walkman. He knocks a carton of "Ur Mum" branded milk off the shelf, which bursts, and forms "Wet Leg" on the floor. He picks up a The Village Press newspaper with "Record breaking: Loudest and longest scream ever recorded by Isle of White locals" [sic] as its headline, tries to underpay Fanny the cashier, played by Teasdale, plugs his band Scotty and the Softboys' gig later that day at the county hall, tells Fanny she would look better without lipstick on, and slips over his spilt milk, which HC the shelf-stacker, played by Chambers, was in the middle of cleaning.

Scotty gets up and goes home. His mother, played by Valerie Hazan, hands him a washing basket, which he takes upstairs, disregards, and turns on his television, to find Fanny and HC playing on it, reminding him that his Softboys are playing, prompting him to get up. He tries to check himself in his bathroom mirror, only to see Fanny and HC behind him laughing, and then walks through a park to his band's camper van, seeing Fanny and HC again, though looks again and sees a different couple. His band takes off, seeing Fanny and HC trailing on bicycles. When the band arrive at the county hall, they find Wet Leg performing in their place, prompting Scotty to begin performing as Fanny. At the end of the video, Scotty wakes up to find Fanny and HC standing over him, still at the supermarket, asking if he was alright, and pointing out that he had been "out for three minutes, twenty two seconds". The video was nominated for Best Rock Video - Newcomer at the 2022 UK Music Video Awards, and won Video of the Year at the Libera Awards.

== Reception and live performances ==
The day after release, the song was declared BBC Radio 1's "Hottest Record"; they would later nominate it for "Hottest Record of the Year". The song spent a week at No. 46 on the UK Independent Singles Chart. Robin Murray of Clash found the song "impetuous" and complimented the song's combination of "pointed vocals" and "odd psychedelic elements in the guitar line", while David Smyth of the Evening Standard, while reviewing the album, noted that when screaming, Teasdale sounded "like a girl at the top of a rollercoaster but also like someone who just won't stand for any more nonsense". Cassie Fox of Louderthanwar.com complimented the song's "excellent handclaps in the chorus, potty mouth (You're always so full of it / Yeah why don't you just suck my dick), and full throat screaming finale", while Bobby Olivier of Spin complimented the song's "St. Vincent-like sense of playful assuredness", and described her "piercing, primal shriek" as "a fine successor to Phoebe Bridgers' guttural howl" on "I Know the End". Alex Rigotti of Gigwise found its "blood-curdling, demon-exorcising scream" and its countdown to be "one of the most entertaining moments" of the album. In addition, Consequence rated the song as the 50th best song of 2022, while Far Out listed it as one of "20 great songs that didn't make [their] '50 Best Songs of 2022' list".

On 16 May 2022, they performed "Wet Dream" and "Ur Mum" on Later... with Jools Holland. Mark Beaumont of The Independent, reviewing their Glastonbury Festival 2022 set, said that the "spiteful" track "could be a chant-along from Glastonbury's peak Britpop years, ricocheting along like Damon Albarn and Justine Frischmann were still mid-breakup". When performing the song live, the music usually pauses for audiences to chime in with their own screams; when performing at Glastonbury Festival 2022, Teasdale was taken aback by the audience's 23 second scream, while Dorian Lynskey of The Guardian, who described the song as "consist[ing] of nothing but hooks and provid[ing] the night's big set piece", noted that at the band's November 2022 appearance at O2 Forum Kentish Town, there was "a full 30 seconds before [the music] slams back in", and described the experience as "cathartic, ecstatic and ridiculous all at once". The Financial Times' Ludovic Hunter-Tilney also reviewed the gig, found the scream to be "absurdly elongated", and noted that she used her appearance "orchestrate[ it] into a mass hullabaloo, a drawn-out moment of pantomime catharsis". The band performed it at Coachella 2023, which featured a scream from Dave Grohl.

== Track listing ==
Digital single

1. "Ur Mum" (Wet Leg) – 3:21

== Personnel and credits ==
=== Wet Leg ===
- Rhian Teasdale – vocals and guitar
- Hester Chambers – guitar and vocals

=== Other musicians ===
- Michael Champion – bass
- Henry Holmes – drums and additional vocals
- Dan Carey – synthesizer and synthesizer programming

=== Technical ===
- Alexis Smith – engineering
- Alan Moulder – mixing
- Matt Colton – mastering

== Charts ==
Chart performance for "Soft Spot"
Chart (2022)	Peak position
UK Independent Singles Chart	46

== Release history ==
Release history for "Soft Spot"
Region	Date	Format	Artist	Label
Various	4 April 2022	Digital download; streaming	Wet Leg	Domino
