= Rhian Teasdale =

English musician (born 1993)

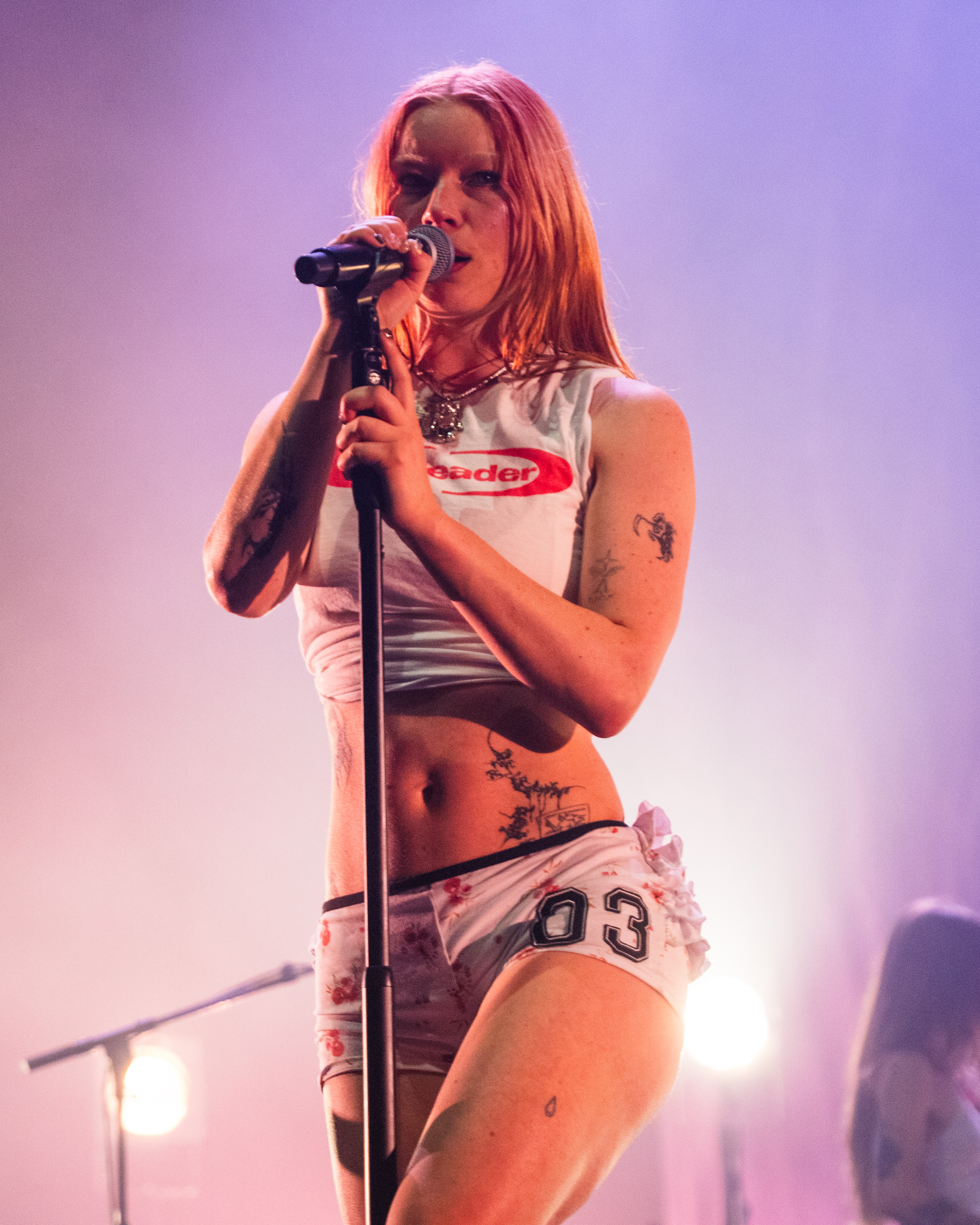
- Teasdale in 2025

Background information
- Born: Rhian Louise Teasdale; 1993 (age 32–33); Formby, Merseyside, England
- Occupations: Singer; songwriter
- Instruments: Vocals; guitar
- Member of: Wet Leg

Rhian Louise Teasdale (born 1993) is an English musician. Born in Formby, she moved to the Isle of Wight aged eight and then to Bristol for her music career. Between 2016 and 2018, she released several singles as Rhain, including "Solid Gold", which was developed with Plastic Mermaids. In 2018, she formed Wet Leg with Hester Chambers, and they released the UK singles chart entries "Chaise Longue" and "Wet Dream" in 2022 and the UK Albums Chart topper Wet Leg in 2023. The year after that, she featured on Orlando Weeks's "Dig".

== Life and career ==
Rhian Louise Teasdale was born in 1993 in Formby; she moved to the Isle of Wight with her family when she was eight. Her parents were both in the merchant navy. Rhys Buchanan of NME incorrectly asserted in September 2016 that Teasdale was from Iceland, leading her to later joke that this was due to the presence of "a secret tunnel that runs right through from Reykjavík to Sandown". Teasdale dropped out of her A-levels to undertake a music BTEC at Platform One music college on the Isle of Wight. On her first day, she met future bandmate Hester Chambers and bonded with her over a shared love of Laura Marling, Patrick Watson, and Nordic music. The pair later dropped out, with Teasdale taking posts as a waitress and then as a stylist, where she dressed characters for adverts. She also spent a summer working at Robin Hill Country Park.

Around age 16, Teasdale met Aled Chivers, the future founder of record label Chiverin, who later drew her to Bristol and signed her as Rhain. (Note: For the fact that Teasdale met Aled, see.; For the fact that Aled's name is in fact Chivers, see.) In 2016, she released a single, "Humdrum Drivel", which Buchanan described as "every inch charming", followed by another single, "Pavlova", which The Independent described as "stripped-back" and featuring "unmistakable vocals fit with haunting piano accompaniment". Around two years later, she released the single "Solid Gold", which she had developed with Plastic Mermaids, a band fronted by Douglas Richards and containing his brother Jamie Richards. She then released "Time Traveller", a song about her grandfather, which she had previously performed for Burberry Acoustic in February 2017.

On 2 September 2018, Teasdale and Chambers, having contributed guitar and piano to each other's works, were sitting on a Ferris wheel at that year's End of the Road Festival, when they decided to form Wet Leg together. The band signed to Domino Recording Company in June 2021 and released "Chaise Longue", followed by "Wet Dream" in September 2021. By the time of the latter's release, "Chaise Longue" had been streamed three million times and its video viewed over a million times. The pair then released the double-A-side single "Too Late Now"/"Oh No" in November 2021, followed by "Angelica" in February 2022. That April, they released "Ur Mum" and then the album Wet Leg, which charted at No. 1 on the UK Albums Chart. The following year, the band supported Harry Styles on his Love On Tour.

In April 2024, Teasdale featured on "Dig" by Orlando Weeks, the former frontman of The Maccabees. The track featured on his album Loja, which was released the following June. In an interview with Clash later that month, Weeks asserted that he had met the band when he performed before them at the Park Stage of Glastonbury Festival and that he had previously declined an offer for him to appear in a video. He also asserted that Teasdale recorded the track in person, as there was a weekend where Weeks was in the UK and Teasdale was visiting friends in the Isle of Wight.

By April 2025, Ellis Durand (bass), Henry Holmes (drums), and Joshua Mobaraki (guitar, synth) had joined the band; subsequent gigs featured Teasdale performing at the front with two of them. That month, the band released "Catch These Fists", a track based on an incident of sexual harassment Teasdale suffered at a bar following a Chappell Roan gig, and announced the album Moisturizer, which they had written as a five-piece while living in Southwold. They subsequently released the singles "CPR" and "Davina McCall" in consecutive months followed by Moisturizer in July, which topped the UK Albums Chart.

== Artistry and personal life ==
In a December 2016 interview, Teasdale noted that she had an eclectic taste in music as a teenager, listening to various artists, including A Tribe Called Quest, Arcade Fire, The Bees, Devendra Banhart, Björk, Joni Mitchell, and Scout Niblett. She also noted she was inspired by "the attitude [...] of people that have just picked up an instrument, used their ears and made something that sounds good to them". Her voice has been compared to Kate Bush, Björk, and Joanna Newsom.

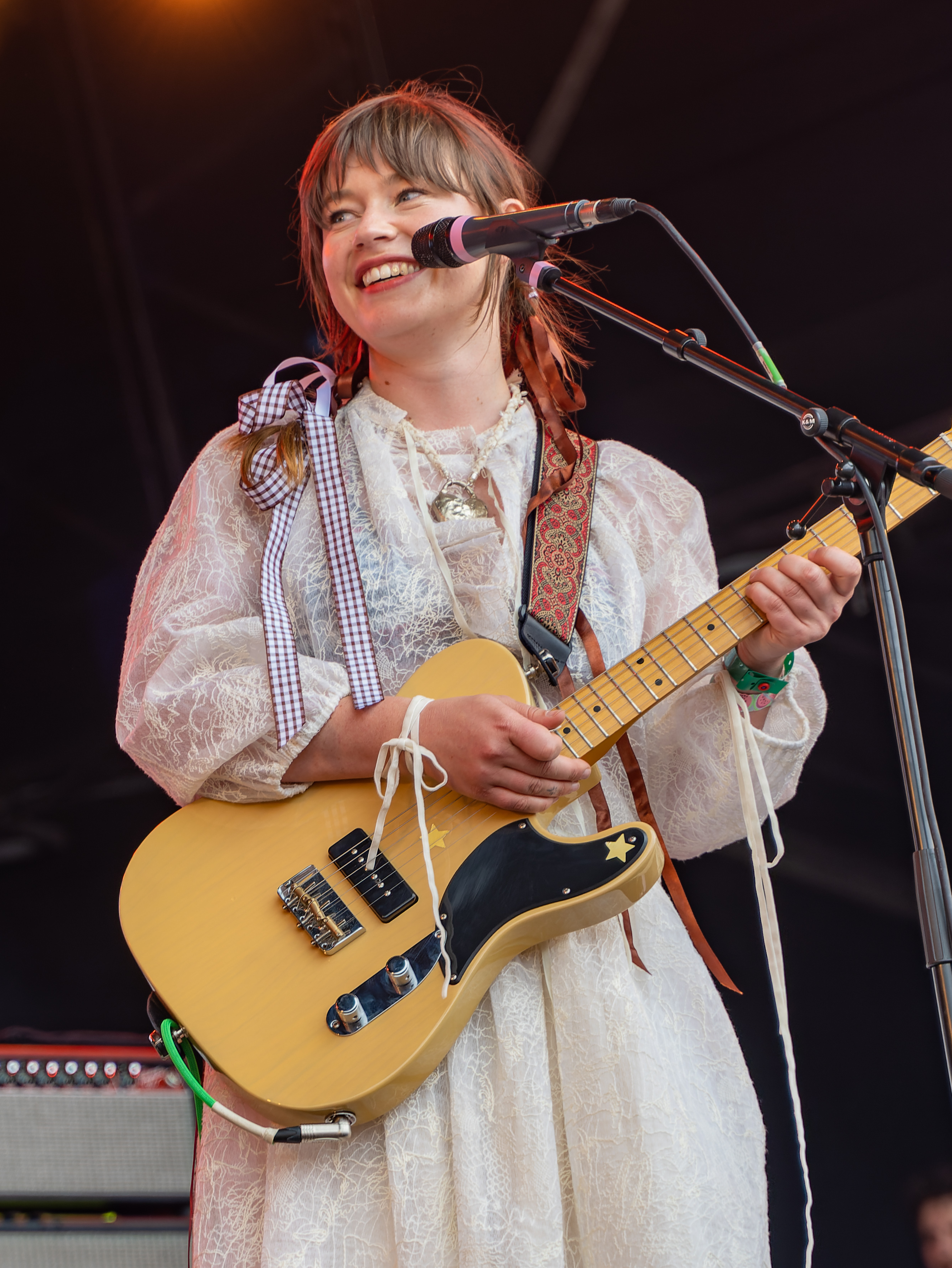
Teasdale performing with Wet Leg in 2022

In July 2022, Teasdale announced that she had "a pretty good-looking girlfriend", and labelled herself as "queer…querying?". By April 2025, she was living in London and had a non-binary partner, who she had met in Portugal at the end of 2021 at their first non-UK concert. In a July 2026 interview, Teasdale confirmed her partner to be British musician Lava La Rue.

Stephen Dalton of Uncut wrote that Teasdale's lyrics on Wet Leg's debut album were "generously laced with weapons-grade swearing [and] a streak of delicious disdain[, ...] mostly directed towards ex-boyfriends and their new partners", citing the album's "Wet Dream", "Loving You", "Piece of Shit", and "Ur Mum" as examples of this. During a 2025 interview, she stated that she was inspired by Mitski's stage presence and by Caroline Polachek. Her cottagecore appearance during her first album was shaped by a desire to avoid being sexualised by men; for her second, she sported bleached eyebrows, dyed pink hair with visible roots, unshaved armpits, and more skin.

In July 2023, Douglas Richards claimed that he and Teasdale had dated off and on between 2013 and 2019 and that, during the first United Kingdom COVID-19 lockdown, Teasdale returned to his house. He also made a number of assertions about the origin of Wet Leg and suggested that several of their songs were about him, including "Piece of Shit". Several journalists and critics responded in defense of Teasdale—Consequence's Abby Jones characterized Richards as "bitter" and "pathetic", while Far Out magazine's Tom Taylor and Glamour magazine's Chloe Laws accused Richards of misogyny, and The i's Rebecca Reid suggested his time would be better spent working harder and rebuilding better instead of wasting time "firing shots" at Teasdale's career. In addition, The Forty-Five's Jenessa Williams criticised The Sunday Times for "gleefully leaning into the narrative that any successful female artist must have been hiding her secret male songwriter all along". Writing in July 2025, Amy Davidson of Ticketmaster wrote that "the collective reaction was one of support for Wet Leg and confusion as to why revealing yourself as the inspiration for a song called 'Piece of Shit' would be any kind of flex".

== Discography ==
=== EPs ===
Title	Details
Oscar November Echo (RHAIN)	Released: 2 December 2016; Format: Digital download, streaming

=== Singles ===
==== As lead artist ====
Singles as lead artist
Title	Year	Album	Ref.
"Humdrum Drivel" (RHAIN)	2016	Oscar November Echo	
"Josephine" (RHAIN)	2016	Oscar November Echo	
"Pavlova" (RHAIN)	2016	Oscar November Echo	
"Solid Gold" (RHAIN)	2018	Non-album singles	
"Time Traveller" (RHAIN)	2018	Non-album singles	

==== As featured artist ====
Singles as lead artist
Title	Year	Album	Ref.
"Dig" (Orlando Weeks feat. Rhian Teasdale)	2024	Loja	
