= Catch These Fists =

Single by Wet Leg

from the album Moisturizer
- Released: 1 April 2025
- Genre: Dance-punk
- Length: 3:08
- Label: Domino
- Songwriters: Ellis Durand; Rhian Teasdale
- Producer: Dan Carey

Wet Leg singles chronology
| "Ur Mum" (2022) | "Catch These Fists" (2025) | "CPR" (2025) |

Official video
- "Catch These Fists" on YouTube

"Catch These Fists" (stylised in all lowercase) is a 2025 single by Wet Leg, released through Domino Recording Company on 1 April 2025 as the lead single from their second studio album, Moisturizer.

== Background ==
"Catch These Fists" was the first new music released by Wet Leg since 2022. It was described as a "late-night rebuke to pickup artists" by Pitchfork. Recalling the evening that inspired the song's lyrics, Rhian Teasdale noted: "Yeah, I was just out with my friends, as is so often the case. And it’s not that the night was a write-off. These situations happen all the time, where you’re very clearly out in a very insular circle, dancing with your friends, being silly, and for that to be obnoxiously interrupted by some person trying to pick you up, it’s a very common occurrence, and very, very obnoxious. I think I’m conditioned to be so polite about things, but that particular night, I was not very polite."

When asked about the song, Rhian Teasdale responded by saying "It was very natural that we would write the second record together".

== Music video ==
The music video was shot on the Isle of Wight and directed by the band, it features references to Ti West, Cameron Crowe and the band's previous music video "Wet Dream". The music video features the same locations as previous Wet Leg music videos such as "Chaise Longue" and "Wet Dream". It features the members of the band running through a field.

== Live performance ==
"Catch These Fists" was performed by Wet Leg on The Tonight Show Starring Jimmy Fallon and on the series premiere of Saturday Night Live UK.

== Critical reception ==
Exclaim! ranked it as the 10th best song of 2025, describing it as a "pugilistic takedown of toxic masculinity" and praising its "pulsating bass line and catchy guitar riffs." Loudwire praised its "infectious energy and killer bass lines" and ranked it as one of the best rock and metal songs of 2025.

== Charts ==
=== Weekly charts ===
Weekly chart performance for "Catch These Fists"
| Chart (2025) | Peak position |
|---|---|
| Canada Modern Rock (Billboard Canada) | 2 |
| Colombia Anglo Airplay (Monitor Latino) | 10 |
| Estonia Airplay (TopHit) | 88 |
| UK Singles (OCC) | 99 |
| UK Independent Singles (OCC) | 39 |
| US Adult Alternative Airplay (Billboard) | 2 |

=== Year-end charts ===
Year-end chart performance for "Catch These Fists"
| Chart (2025) | Position |
|---|---|
| Canada Modern Rock (Billboard) | 19 |
| US Rock & Alternative Airplay (Billboard) | 34 |
