= Lava La Rue =

British musician

- Born: Aiwa Laurél; Northwick Park Hospital, London, England
- Genres: Neo-psychedelia; psychedelic soul; alternative hip-hop; indie pop
- Occupations: Musician, singer, visual artist, director
- Years active: 2018–present
- Labels: Marathon Artists, Dirty Hit
- Website: lavalarueofficial.com

Aiwa or Ava Laurel, better known by Lava La Rue is a non-binary British musician, singer, and director from West London. They are the founder and creative director of NiNE8 collective.

== Early life ==
Laurel was born in Northwick Park Hospital in London, to a teenage Latvian migrant father and working-class Black British mother who met through London's free party / rave scene in the late 90s. Laurel's grandparents on their mother's side directly came from the Windrush Generation whereas Laurel's grandparents on their father's side grew up in the Latvian Soviet Socialist Republic, which led to Laurel's father migrating to London as a teenager to escape the aftermath of the Latvian SSR fall with hopes of leading a more hedonistic lifestyle in the UK.

Laurel's parents' relationship was brief; their father was never interested in getting a regular job to become a full-time father, leaving Laurel's mother to look after their child as a single parent. As a result, Laurel was raised partly by their Jamaican grandmother and grew up around St Raphael's Estate, Kensal Rise and Ladbroke Grove in West London. They noted that being raised by their grandmother gave them the "Experience of being raised around 1st generation Caribbean Culture".

Laurel was always playing in bands growing up, and at age 13 they decided they wanted to be in an all-girl version of The Clash joining a Post-Punk tween trio called "The West Borns" who played local street fair gigs outside the Tabernacle, Notting Hill and on Golborne Road They entered foster care at the age of 14 whilst attending Queens Park Community School.

Laurel started creating music at the age of 16 while being in and out of foster care, sharing their songs online and with friends at Richmond upon Thames College. At college, Laurel befriended Mac Wetha, Biig Piig and other future collaborators — who not only helped shape the music Laurel was making themself - but also led to the formation of NiNE8, the London collective made up of musicians, artists, rappers and other creatives.

At age 19, Laurel was invited to Japan by a modelling agency, and decided to stay there until they ran out of money, DJing at local fashion parties and befriending members of the Tokyo underground music scene. They lived in the Shibuya district of Tokyo and at one point crashed in a spare apartment of Toshimi Ichiki, the head booker of Zucca Models Tokyo, from summer till late 2017.

== Career ==
On 22 May 2018, Lava La Rue released the first single, "Widdit", made whilst living in Tokyo with producer friend Disk Nagataki and Japanese collective Tokyo Vitamin. The song quickly garnered online support and millions of streams, establishing La Rue as an independent artist within the alternative UK music scene. On 24 June 2018, La Rue released their first EP, Letra.

On 18 September 2019, Lava La Rue released a mixtape titled Stitches.

In 2020, Lava La Rue announced the release of third official solo project, Butter-Fly, written in collaboration with Deb Never and Clairo and features production credits from Isom Innis of Foster the People and Vegyn. On 19 February 2021, La Rue released Butter-Fly via Marathon Artists.

On 4 April 2022, Wet Leg released "Ur Mum", accompanied by a music video directed by Lava La Rue, using their alias Lavaland. La Rue stated that they directed the video while finishing their own EP, Hi-Fidelity, and that the video was made after being invited to spend time on the Isle of Wight with Wet Leg and their eponymous llama, La Rue's stay with the band reminded them of a British version of Napoleon Dynamite which inspired the music video. La Rue went on to creatively direct the band's TV performance of Chaise Longue at the Brit Awards 2023, further referencing British Isles culture by assembling a team of female Morris dancers to accompany the performance.

On 31 May 2022, Lava La Rue released the single "Hi-Fidelity", featuring friend and fellow collaborator, Biig Piig. On 29 July 2022, La Rue released Hi-Fidelity, completing their two-EP deal with Marathon Artists. At the end of 2022, Lava La Rue announced they signed to Dirty Hit. In April 2023, Lava La Rue made their debut Coachella performance. On 2 May 2023, La Rue released "Renegade", their first single via Dirty Hit.

On 19 July 2024, Lava La Rue released their debut album "STARFACE" on Dirty Hit label.

== Personal life ==
Laurel is a non-binary artist who uses they/them pronouns. They identify as a queer-lesbian. Laurel currently resides in West London. They are also in a relationship with Rhian Teasdale, lead singer of the band Wet Leg.

== Stage name ==
Lava La Rue is an anagram of the phonetic English spelling of their commonly known name, Ava Laurel.

== Discography ==
=== Albums ===
- STARFACE (2024)

=== Mixtapes ===
- Stitches (2019)

=== EPs ===
- Letra (2018)
- Butter-Fly (2021)
- Hi-Fidelity (2022)

=== Singles ===
- "Widdit" (2018)
- "Touch (My Mind)" feat. Lorenzorsv (2018)
- "Burn" (2019)
- "MOSCHINO IN 83" (2019)
- "TLSL (Stitches)" (2019)
- "G.O.Y.D." (2020)
- "Angel" feat. Deb Never (2020)
- "For You" (2021)
- "Vest & Boxers" (2022)
- "Hi-Fidelity" feat. Biig Piig (2022)
- "Don't Come Back" (2022)
- "Renegade" (2023)
- ”Push N Shuv” (2024)
- ”Humanity” (2024)
- "JET LAGGED" with Foster the People (2025)
