= Grammy Award for Best Remixed Recording, Non-Classical =

Honor presented to artists and producers

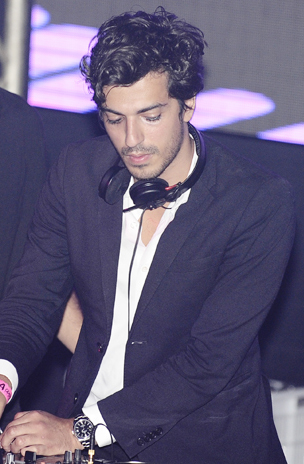
- Gesaffelstein's remix of Lady Gaga's "Abracadabra" is the most recent recipient
- Awarded for: Quality remixed songs
- Country: United States
- Presented by: National Academy of Recording Arts and Sciences
- First award: 1998
- Currently held by: Gesaffelstein, "Abracadabra (Gesaffelstein remix)" (2026)
- Website: Grammy.com

The Grammy Award for Best Remixed Recording, Non-Classical is an honor presented to producers for quality remixed recordings at the Grammy Awards, a ceremony that was established in 1958 and originally called the Gramophone Awards. Honors in several categories are presented at the ceremony annually by the National Academy of Recording Arts and Sciences of the United States to "honor artistic achievement, technical proficiency and overall excellence in the recording industry, without regard to album sales or chart position".

The award was first presented as the Grammy Award for Remixer of the Year, Non-Classical at the 40th Grammy Awards in 1998 to Frankie Knuckles. While the award was under this name, it was presented without specifying a work; when it shifted to its current name in 2002 works were named. According to the category description guide for the 52nd Grammy Awards, the award is presented "to recognize an individual(s) who takes previously recorded material and adds or alters it in such a way as to create a new and unique performance". The prize is given to the remixer(s), not the original artist(s).

French DJ David Guetta, British producer Jacques Lu Cont, and Skrillex have each won the award twice. David Guetta has the most nominations, with six. Kaskade and Steve "Silk" Hurley each have the most nominations without a win, with four. American producer Maurice Joshua was nominated in 2001 and 2003, and then won in 2004 for the Maurice's Soul Mix of "Crazy in Love". Dave Audé was nominated three times for the award, winning once, while Frankie Knuckles, David Morales, Roger Sanchez, Hex Hector and Deep Dish have each been nominated for the award twice and have won it once.

== Recipients ==
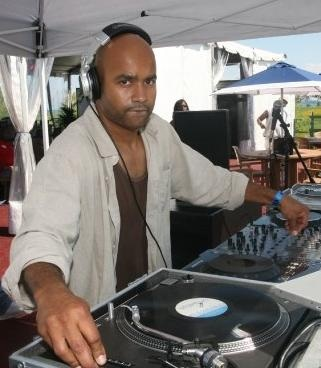
Four-time nominee Steve "Silk" Hurley.

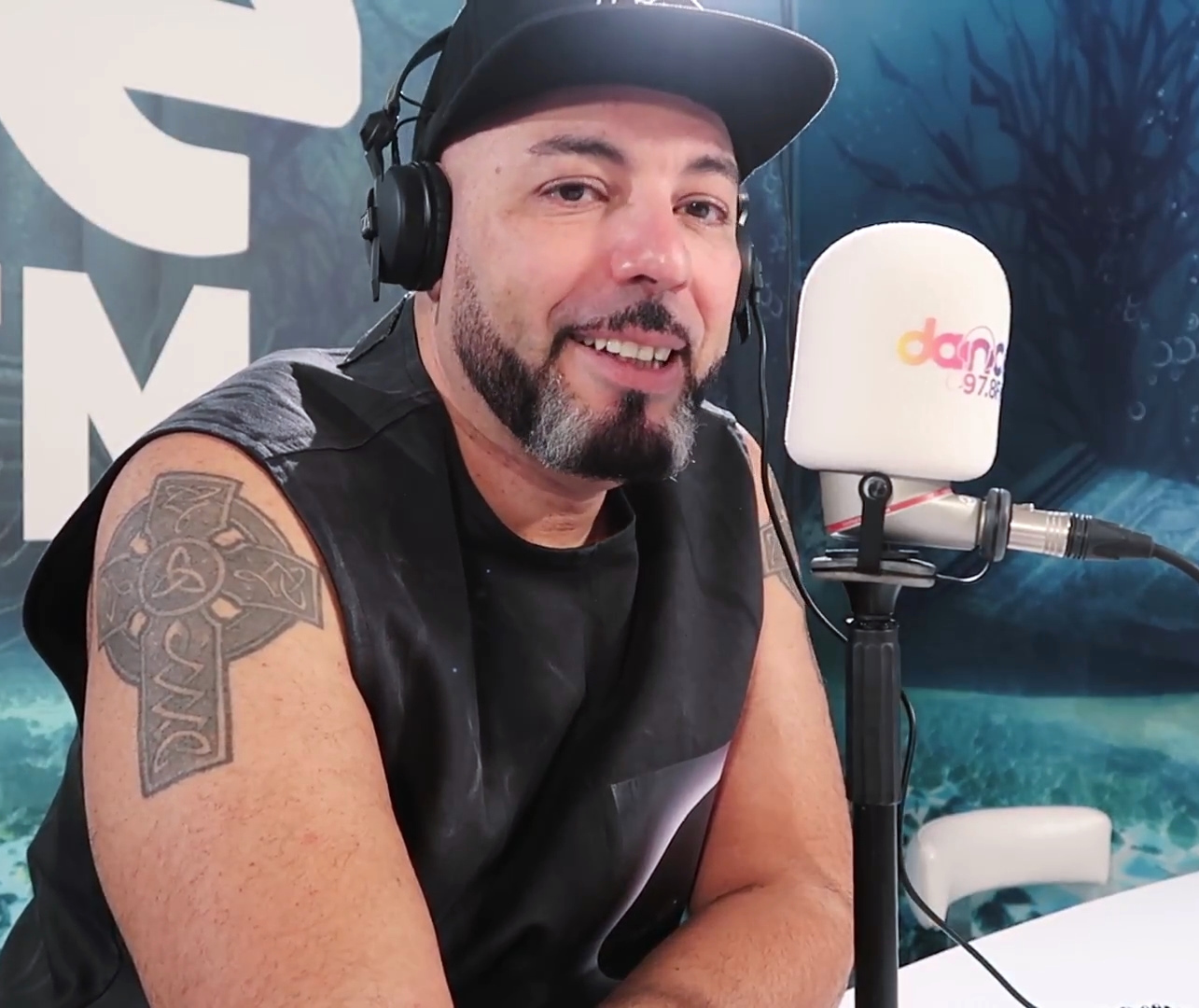
2003 winner Roger Sanchez

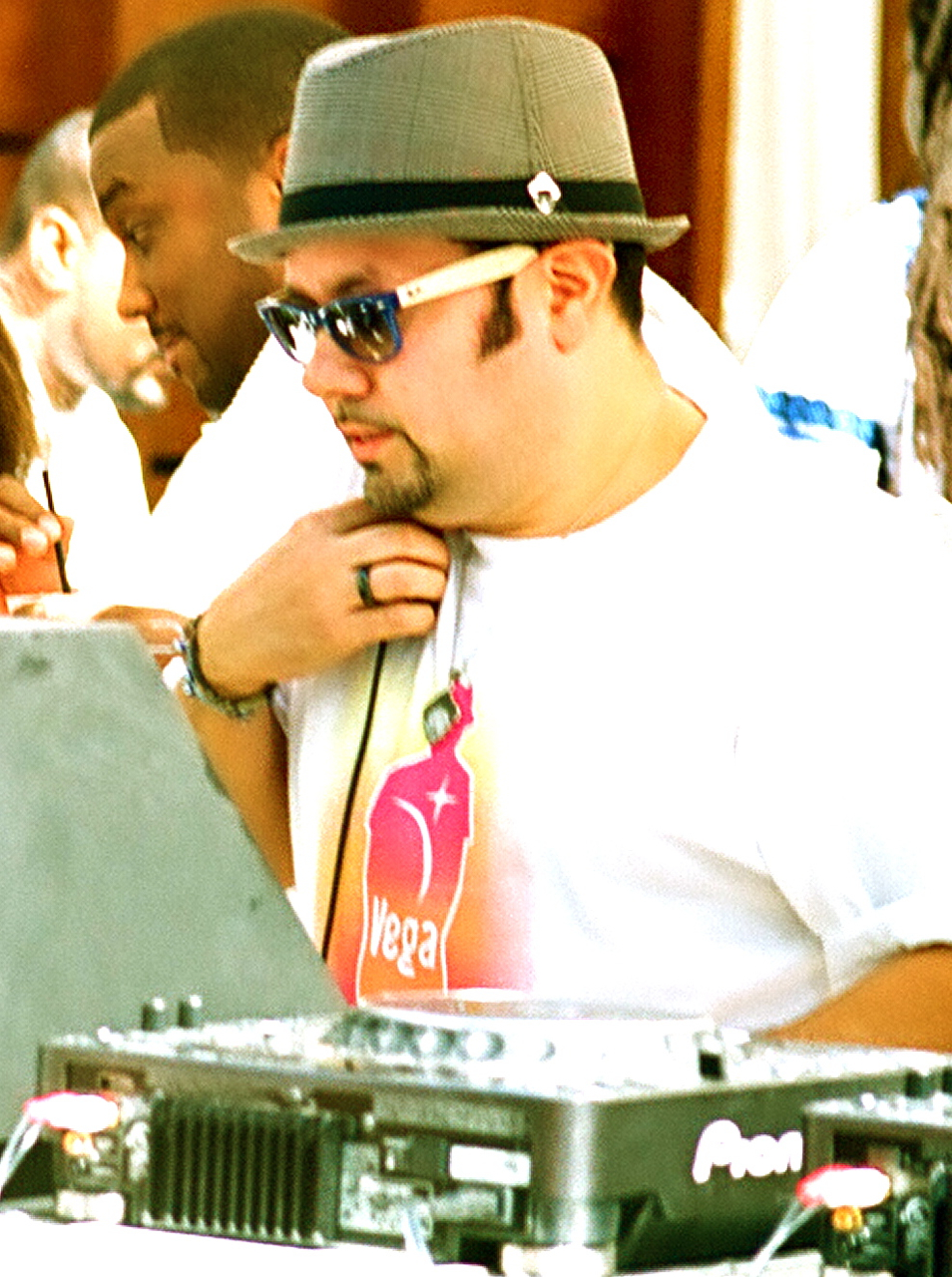
2006 winner Louie Vega performing in 2009.

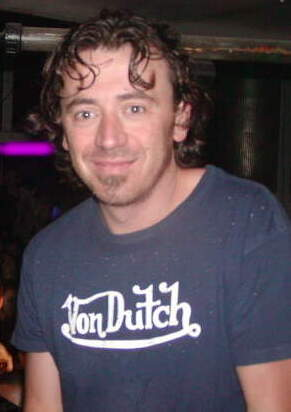
2008 winner Benny Benassi in 2010.

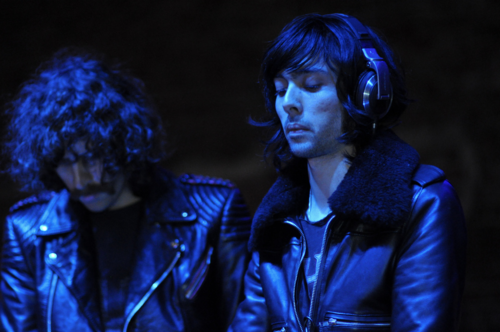
2009 winners Justice performing in 2011

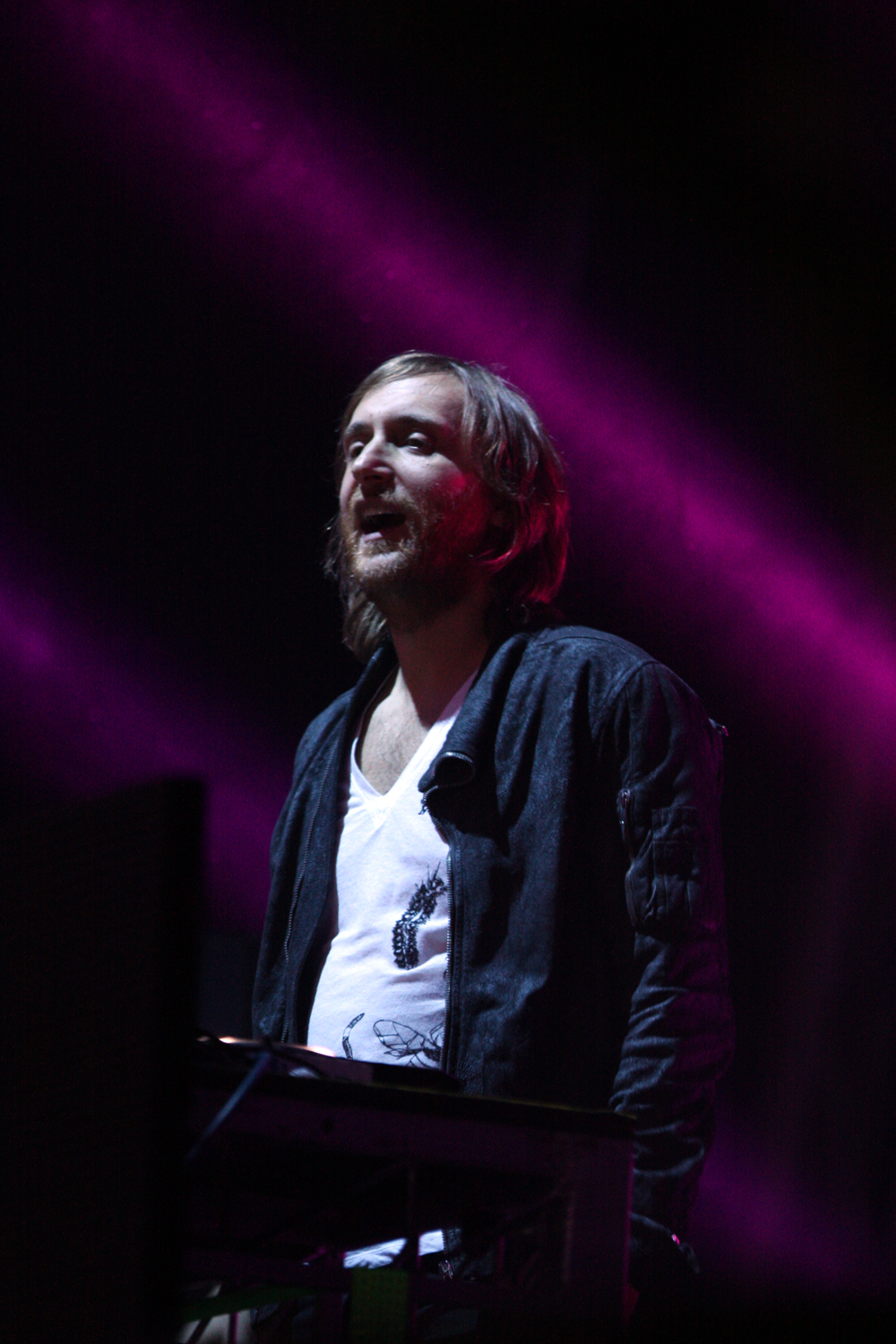
Two-time winner, David Guetta

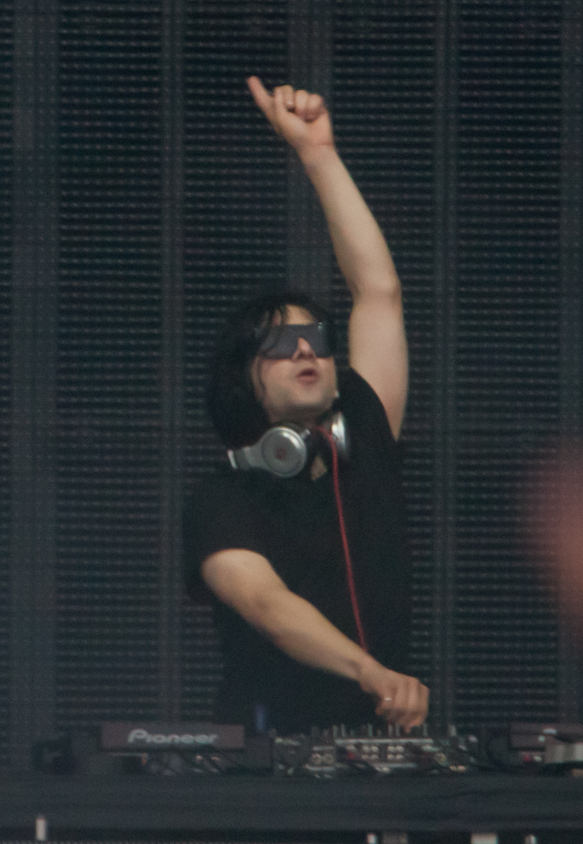
Two-time winner Skrillex

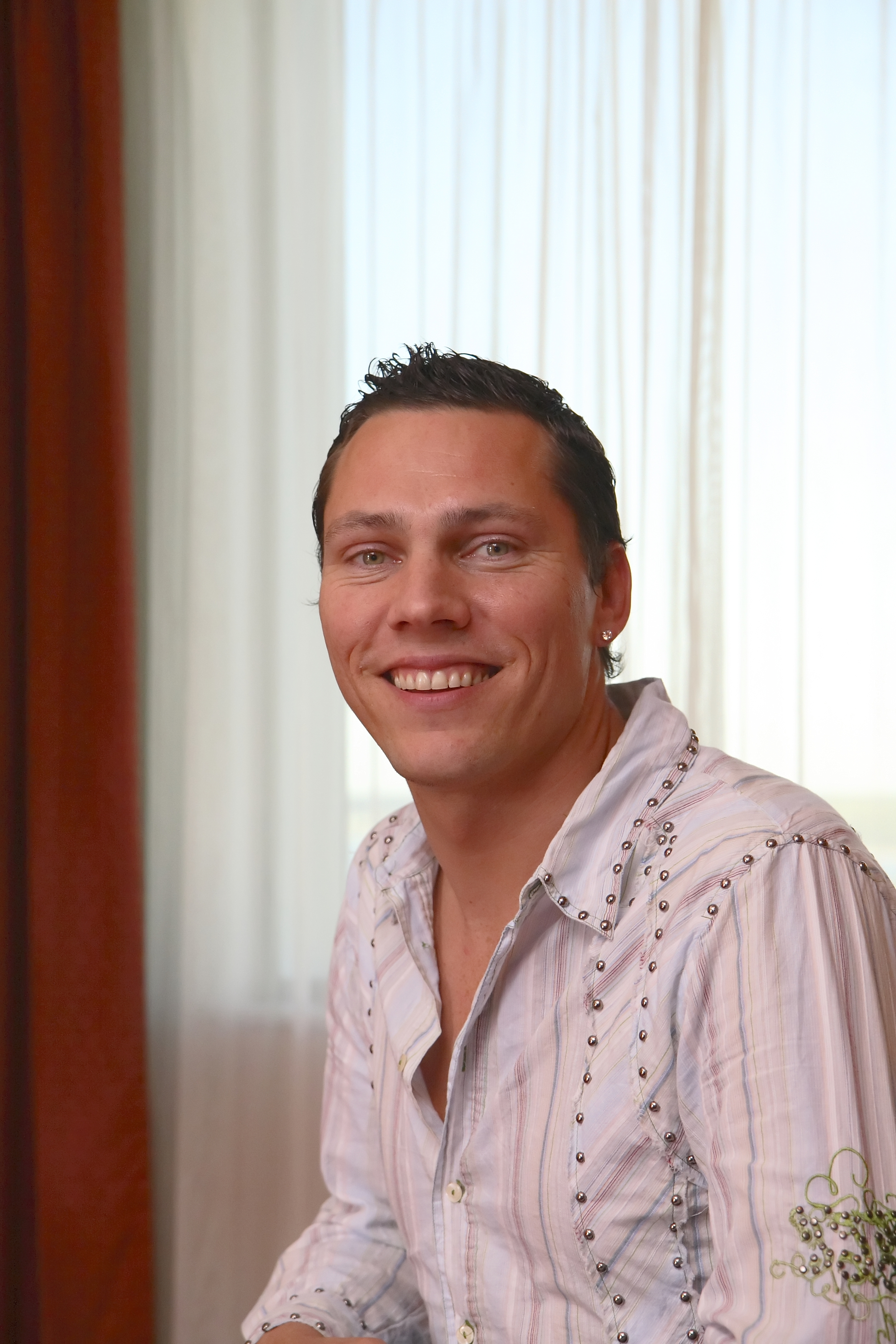
2015 winner, Tijs Michiel Verwest (Tiësto)

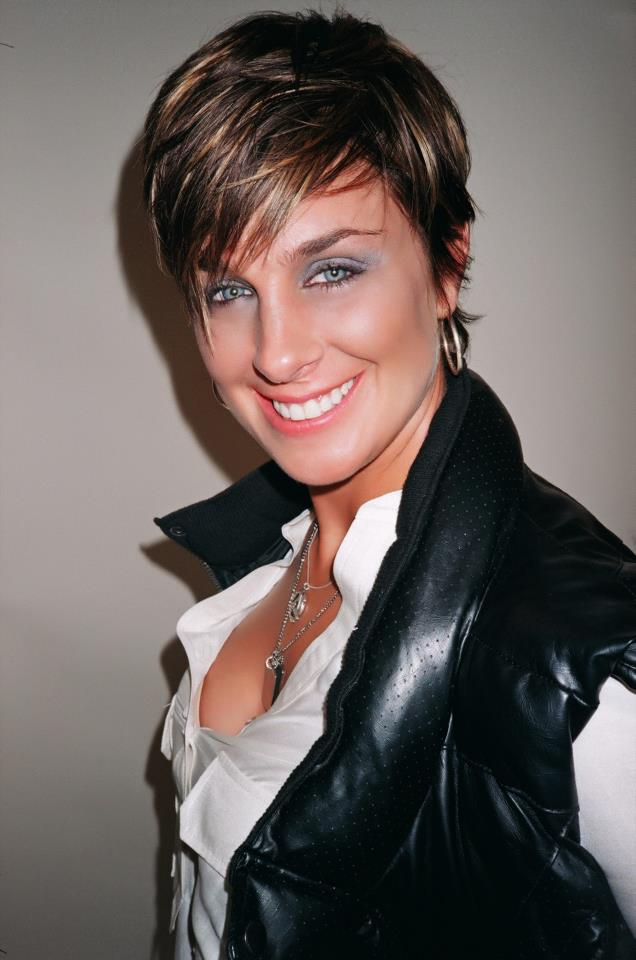
2020 recipient, Tracy Young

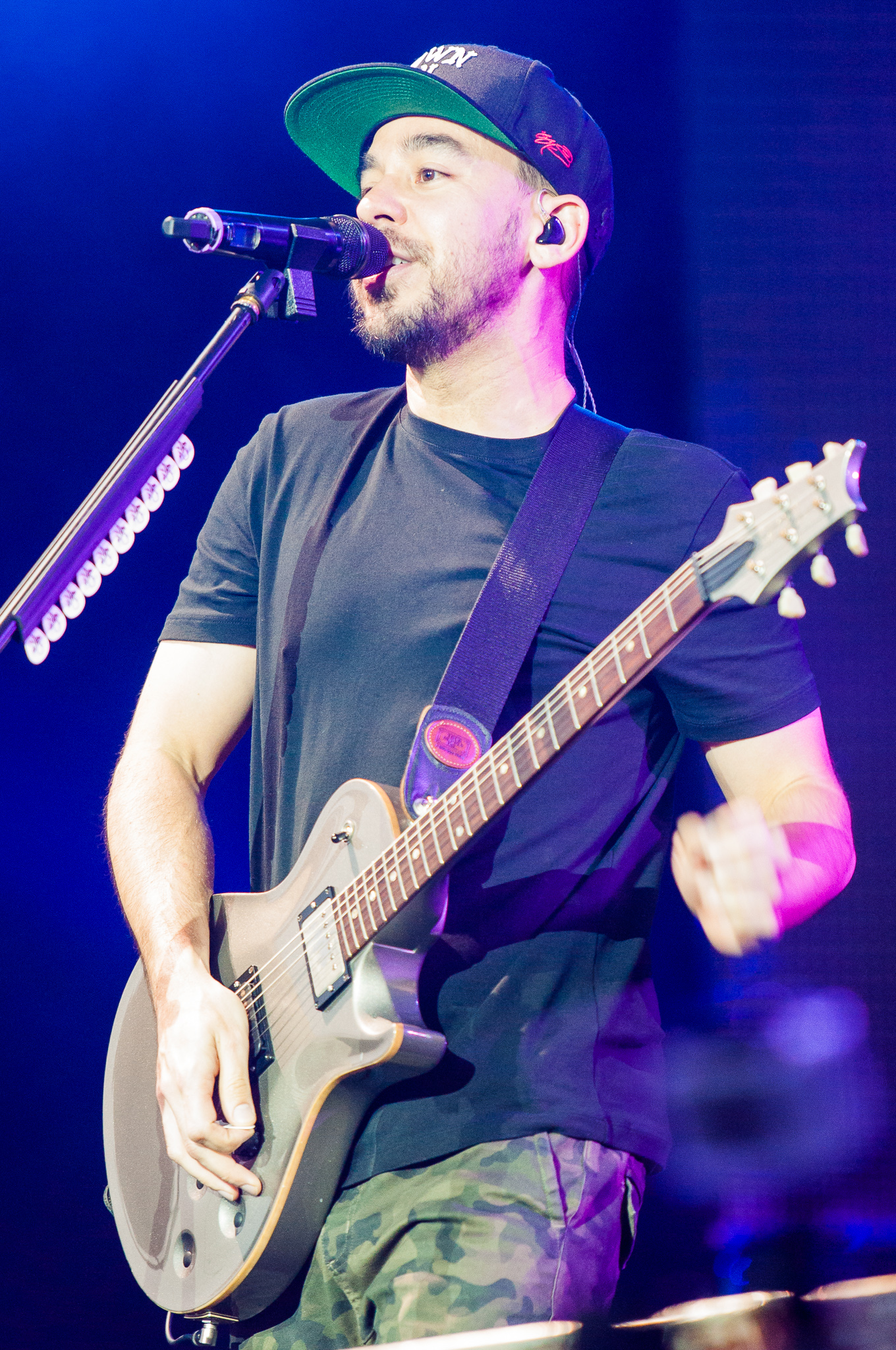
2022 winner, Mike Shinoda

=== 1990s ===
Year	Work	Remixer	Artist
1998
1998	—N/a	Frankie Knuckles	—N/a
1998	—N/a	David Morales	—N/a
1998	—N/a	Mousse T.	—N/a
1998	—N/a	Todd Terry	—N/a
1998	—N/a	Armand Van Helden	—N/a
1999
1999	—N/a	David Morales	—N/a
1999	—N/a	Steve "Silk" Hurley	—N/a
1999	—N/a	Frankie Knuckles	—N/a
1999	—N/a	Masters at Work	—N/a
1999	—N/a	Roger Sanchez	—N/a

=== 2000s ===
Year	Work	Remixer	Artist
2000
2000	—N/a	Club 69	—N/a
2000	—N/a	Hex Hector	—N/a
2000	—N/a	Steve "Silk" Hurley	—N/a
2000	—N/a	Masters at Work	—N/a
2000	—N/a	Soul Solution	—N/a
2001
2001	—N/a	Hex Hector	—N/a
2001	—N/a	Deep Dish	—N/a
2001	—N/a	Maurice Joshua	—N/a
2001	—N/a	Peter Rauhofer	—N/a
2001	—N/a	Richard Humpty Vission	—N/a
2002
2002	"Thank You" (Deep Dish Vocal Remix)	Deep Dish	Dido
2002	"Baby, Come Over (This Is Our Night)" (K-Klass Klub Mix)	K-Klass	Samantha Mumba
2002	"Heard It All Before" (E-Smoove House Filter Mix)	E-Smoove	Sunshine Anderson
2002	"I Feel Loved" (Danny Tenaglia Labor of Love Edit)	Danny Tenaglia	Depeche Mode
2002	"Soul Shakedown" (Silk's Downunder Mix)	Steve "Silk" Hurley	Bob Marley
2003
2003	"Hella Good" (Roger Sanchez Remix Main)	Roger Sanchez	No Doubt
2003	"He Loves Me" (Illegal Mix)	Jay-J Hernandez and Chris Lum	Jill Scott
2003	"Lost Love" (Felix Da Housecat Thee Clubhead Mix)	Felix da Housecat	Rinôçérôse
2003	"What About Us?" (SilkMix.Com Mix)	Steve "Silk" Hurley	Brandy
2003	"Work It Out" (Maurice's Nu Soul Mix)	Maurice Joshua	Beyoncé
2004
2004	"Crazy in Love" (Maurice's Soul Mix)	Maurice Joshua	Beyoncé featuring Jay Z
2004	"Beautiful" (Peter Rauhofer Mix)	Club 69	Christina Aguilera
2004	"Don't Make Me Come to Vegas" (Timo on Tori)	Martin Buttrich and Timo Maas	Tori Amos
2004	"Get It Together" (Bill Hamel Vocal Mix)	Bill Hamel	Seal
2004	"Lei Lo Lai" (MAW Mix)	Masters at Work	The Latin Project
2005
2005	"It's My Life" (Jacques Lu Cont's Thin White Duke Mix)	Jacques Lu Cont	No Doubt
2005	"Amazing" (Full Intention Club Mix)	Michael Gray and Jon Pearn	George Michael
2005	"Motor Inn" (Felix Da Housecat's High Octane Mix)	Felix da Housecat	Iggy Pop with Feedom, featuring Peaches
2005	"She Wants to Move" (Basement Jaxx Mix)	Basement Jaxx	N.E.R.D.
2005	"Watching Cars Go By"	Sasha	Felix da Housecat
2006
2006	"Superfly" (Louie Vega EOL Mix)	Louie Vega	Curtis Mayfield
2006	"Fever" (Adam Freeland Remix)	Adam Freeland	Sarah Vaughan
2006	"Flashdance" (Guetta & Garraud's Fuck Me I'm Famous Remix)	Joachim Garraud and David Guetta	Deep Dish
2006	"Mr. Brightside" (Jacques Lu Cont's Thin White Duke Mix)	Jacques Lu Cont	The Killers
2006	"What Is Hip?" (T.O.P.R.M.X.)	Meat Beat Manifesto	Tower of Power
2007
2007	"Talk" (Thin White Duke Mix)	Jacques Lu Cont	Coldplay
2007	"Be Without You" (Moto Blanco Vocal Mix)	Moto Blanco	Mary J. Blige
2007	"Damage" (Buick Project Remix)	Buick Project	Tiefschwarz & Tracey Thorn
2007	"Déjà Vu" (Freemasons Club Mix – No Rap)	Russell Small and James Wiltshire	Beyoncé
2007	"World Hold On" (E-Smoove Remix)	E-Smoove	Bob Sinclar
2008
2008	"Bring the Noise" (Benny Benassi Sfaction Remix)	Benny Benassi	Public Enemy
2008	"Angelicus" (Andy Moor Full Length Mix)	Andy Moor	Delerium featuring Isabel Bayrakdarian
2008	"Like a Child" (Carl Craig Remix)	Carl Craig	Junior Boys
2008	"Proper Education" (Club Mix - Radio Edit)	Eric Prydz	Eric Prydz vs Pink Floyd
2008	"Sorry" (Dirty South Mix)	Dirty South	Kaskade
2009
2009	"Electric Feel" (Justice Remix)	Justice	MGMT
2009	"Closer" (StoneBridge Radio Edit)	StoneBridge	Ne-Yo
2009	"4 Minutes" (Junkie XL Remix)	Junkie XL	Madonna featuring Justin Timberlake
2009	"Just Fine" (Moto Blanco Remix)	Moto Blanco	Mary J. Blige
2009	"The Longest Road" (Deadmau5 Remix)	Deadmau5	Morgan Page featuring Lissie

=== 2010s ===
Year	Work	Remixer	Artist
2010
2010	"When Love Takes Over" (Electro Extended Remix)	David Guetta	David Guetta featuring Kelly Rowland
2010	"Don't Believe in Love" (Dennis Ferrer Objektivity Mix)	Dennis Ferrer	Dido
2010	"The Girl and the Robot" (Jean Elan Remix)	Jean Elan	Röyksopp
2010	"I Want You" (Dave Audé Remix)	Dave Audé	Dean Coleman featuring DCLA
2010	"No You Girls" (Trentemoller Remix)	Anders Trentemøller	Franz Ferdinand
2011
2011	"Revolver" (David Guetta's One Love Club Remix)	David Guetta and Afrojack	Madonna
2011	"Fantasy" (Morgan Page Remix)	Morgan Page	Nadia Ali
2011	"Funk Nasty" (Wolfgang Gartner Remix Edit)	Wolfgang Gartner	Andy Caldwell featuring Gram'ma Funk
2011	"Orpheus (Quiet Carnival)" (Funk Generation Mix)	Mike Rizzo	Sergio Mendes
2011	"Sweet Disposition" (Axwell and Dirty South Remix)	Axel Hedfors and Dragan Roganovic	The Temper Trap
2012
2012	"Cinema" (Skrillex Remix)	Skrillex	Benny Benassi
2012	"Collide" (Afrojack Remix)	Afrojack	Leona Lewis
2012	"End of Line" (Photek Remix)	Photek	Daft Punk
2012	"Only Girl (In the World)" (Rosabel Club Mix)	Ralphi Rosario and Abel Aguilera	Rihanna
2012	"Rope" (Deadmau5 Mix)	Deadmau5	Foo Fighters
2013
2013	"Promises" (Skrillex and Nero Remix)	Joseph Ray, Skrillex and Daniel Stephens	Nero
2013	"In My Mind" (Axwell Remix)	Axel Hedfors	Ivan Gough and Feenixpawl featuring Georgi Kay
2013	"Lie Down in Darkness" (Photek Remix)	Photek	Moby
2013	"Midnight City" (Eric Prydz Private Remix)	Eric Prydz	M83
2013	"The Veldt" (Tommy Trash Remix)	Tommy Trash	Deadmau5 featuring Chris James
2014
2014	"Summertime Sadness (Cedric Gervais Remix)"	Cedric Gervais	Lana Del Rey
2014	"Days Turn Into Nights" (Andy Caldwell Remix)	Andy Caldwell	Delerium featuring Michael Logen
2014	"If I Lose Myself" (Alesso vs. OneRepublic)	Alesso	OneRepublic
2014	"Locked out of Heaven" (Sultan + Ned Shepard Remix)	Ned Shepard and Sultan	Bruno Mars
2014	"One Love/People Get Ready" (Photek Remix)	Rupert Parkes	Bob Marley and The Wailers
2015
2015	"All of Me" (Tiësto's Birthday Treatment Remix)	Tijs Michiel Verwest	John Legend
2015	"Falling Out" (Ming Remix)	MING	Crossfingers featuring Danny Losito
2015	"Pompeii" (Audien Remix)	Audien	Bastille
2015	"The Rising" (Eddie Amador Remix)	Eddie Amador	Five Knives
2015	"Smile" (Kaskade Edit)	Ryan Raddon	Galantis
2015	"Waves" (Robin Schulz Remix)	Robin Schulz	Mr. Probz
2016
2016	"Uptown Funk" (Dave Audé Remix)	Dave Audé	Mark Ronson featuring Bruno Mars
2016	"Berlin By Overnight" (CFCF Remix)	CFCF	Daniel Hope
2016	"Hold On" (Fatum Remix)	Bill Hamel and Chad Newbold	JES, Shant and Clint Maximus
2016	"Runaway (U & I)" (Kaskade Remix)	Ryan Raddon	Galantis
2016	"Say My Name" (RAC Remix)	André Allen Anjos	Odesza featuring Zyra
2017
2017	"Tearing Me Up" (RAC Remix)	André Allen Anjos	Bob Moses
2017	"Cali Coast" (Psionics Remix)	Josh Williams	Soul Pacific
2017	"Heavy Star Movin'" (starRo Remix)	starRo	The Silver Lake Chorus
2017	"Nineteen Hundred and Eighty-Five" (Timo Maas and James Teej Remix)	Timo Maas and James Teej	Paul McCartney and Wings
2017	"Only" (Kaskade X Lipless Remix)	Ryan Raddon and Lipless	Ry X
2017	"Wide Open" (Joe Goddard Remix)	Joe Goddard	The Chemical Brothers
2018
2018	"You Move" (Latroit Remix)	Dennis White	Depeche Mode
2018	"Can't Let You Go" (Louie Vega Roots Mix)	Louie Vega	Loleatta Holloway
2018	"Funk O'De Funk" (Smle Remix)	Smle	Bobby Rush
2018	"Undercover" (Adventure Club Remix)	Leighton James & Christian Srigley	Kehlani
2018	"A Violent Noise" (Four Tet Remix)	Four Tet	The XX
2019
2019	"Walking Away" (Mura Masa Remix)	Alex Crossan	Haim
2019	"Audio" (Cid Remix)	Cid	LSD
2019	"How Long" (EDX's Dubai Skyline Remix)	Maurizio Colella	Charlie Puth
2019	"Only Road" (Cosmic Gate Remix)	Stefan Bossems and Claus Terhoeven	Gabriel & Dresden featuring Sub Teal
2019	"Stargazing" (Kaskade Remix)	Ryan Raddon	Kygo featuring Justin Jesso

=== 2020s ===
Year	Work	Remixer	Artist
2020
2020	"I Rise" (Tracy Young's Pride Intro Radio Remix)	Tracy Young	Madonna
2020	"Mother's Daughter" (Wuki Remix)	Wuki	Miley Cyrus
2020	"The One" (High Contrast Remix)	Lincoln Barrett	Jorja Smith
2020	"Swim" (ford. Remix)	Luc Bradford	Mild Minds
2020	"Work It" (Soulwax Remix)	David Gerard C Dewaele and Stephan Antoine Dewaele	Marie Davidson
2021
2021	"Roses" (Imanbek Remix)	Imanbek Zeikenov	Saint Jhn
2021	"Do You Ever" (RAC Mix)	RAC	Phil Good
2021	"Imaginary Friends" (Morgan Page Remix)	Morgan Page	Deadmau5
2021	"Praying for You" (Louie Vega Main Mix)	Louie Vega	Jasper Street Co.
2021	"Young & Alive" (Bazzi vs. Haywyre Remix)	Haywyre	Bazzi
2022
2022	"Passenger" (Mike Shinoda Remix)	Mike Shinoda	Deftones
2022	"Back to Life" (Booker T Kings of Soul Datta Dub)	Booker T	Soul II Soul
2022	"Born for Greatness" (Cymek Remix)	Spencer Bastin	Papa Roach
2022	"Constant Craving" (Fashionably Late Remix)	Tracy Young	k.d. lang
2022	"Inside Out" (3SCAPE DRM Remix)	3SCAPE DRM	Zedd and Griff
2022	"Met Him Last Night" (Dave Audé Remix)	Dave Audé	Demi Lovato and Ariana Grande
2022	"Talks" (Mura Masa Remix)	Alexander Crossan	PVA
2023
2023	"About Damn Time" (Purple Disco Machine Remix)	Purple Disco Machine	Lizzo
2023	"Break My Soul" (Terry Hunter Remix)	Terry Hunter	Beyoncé
2023	"Easy Lover" (Four Tet Remix)	Four Tet	Ellie Goulding
2023	"Slow Song" (Paul Woolford Remix)	Paul Woolford	The Knocks and Dragonette
2023	"Too Late Now" (Soulwax Remix)	Soulwax	Wet Leg
2024
2024	"Wagging Tongue" (Wet Leg Remix)	Wet Leg	Depeche Mode
2024	"Alien Love Call"	BadBadNotGood	Turnstile featuring Blood Orange
2024	"New Gold" (Dom Dolla Remix)	Dom Dolla	Gorillaz featuring Tame Impala and Bootie Brown
2024	"Reviver" (Totally Enormous Extinct Dinosaurs Remix)	Totally Enormous Extinct Dinosaurs	Lane 8
2024	"Workin' Hard" (Terry Hunter Remix)	Terry Hunter	Mariah Carey
2025
2025	"Espresso" (Working Late Remix)	Mark Ronson x FnZ	Sabrina Carpenter
2025	"Alter Ego" (Kaytranada Remix)	Kaytranada	Doechii featuring JT
2025	"A Bar Song (Tipsy)" (Remix)	David Guetta	Shaboozey and David Guetta
2025	"Jah Sees Them" (Amapiano Remix)	Alexx Antaeus, Footsteps and MrMyish	Julian Marley and Antaeus
2025	"Von Dutch" (Remix)	A. G. Cook	Charli XCX and A. G. Cook featuring Addison Rae
2026
2026	"Abracadabra" (Gesaffelstein Remix)	Gesaffelstein	Lady Gaga
2026	"Don't Forget About Us"	Kaytranada	Mariah Carey and Kaytranada
2026	"A Dreams a Dream" (Ron Trent Remix)	Ron Trent	Soul II Soul
2026	"Galvanize"	Chris Lake	The Chemical Brothers and Chris Lake
2026	"Golden" (David Guetta REM/X)	David Guetta	Huntrix: Ejae, Audrey Nuna and Rei Ami
2027	"Beto's Horns" (fred remix)	Fred Again and Tom Norris	Fred Again, Ca7riel & Paco Amoroso
2027	"I Just Might" (Austin Millz Remix)	Austin Millz	Bruno Mars and Austin Millz
2027	"Love Sensation" (Afterhours Mix)	Stuart Price	Madonna and Kylie Minogue
2027	"Opalite" (Chris Lake Remix)	Chris Lake	Taylor Swift
2027	"A Question of Trust" (Boys Noize Remix)	Boys Noize	Nine Inch Nails and Boys Noize
2027	"Where Is My Husband!" (David Guetta and Hypaton Remix)	David Guetta and Hypaton	Raye, David Guetta and Hypaton

^{^[I]} Each year is linked to the article about the Grammy Awards held that year.

== Artists with multiple wins ==
2 wins

- David Guetta
- Jacques Lu Cont
- Skrillex

== Artists with multiple nominations ==
6 nominations

- David Guetta

4 nominations

- Kaskade
- Steve "Silk" Hurley

3 nominations

- Dave Audé
- Jacques Lu Cont
- Louie Vega
- Masters at Work
- Maurice Joshua
- Peter Rauhofer
- Photek
- RAC

2 nominations

- Afrojack
- Axwell
- David Morales
- Deadmau5
- Deep Dish
- Dirty South
- Eric Prydz
- E-Smoove
- Felix da Housecat
- Four Tet
- Frankie Knuckles
- Hex Hector
- Kaytranada
- Moto Blanco
- Morgan Page
- Mura Masa
- Roger Sanchez
- Skrillex
- Soulwax
- Terry Hunter
- Timo Maas
- Tracy Young

== See also ==
- Audio mixing (recorded music)
- List of Grammy Award categories
