= Moisturizer (album) =

Studio album by Wet Leg
- Released: 11 July 2025
- Studios: Salvation Studios, Brighton
- Genres: Indie rock; post-punk; new wave; power pop
- Length: 38:22
- Label: Domino
- Producer: Dan Carey

Wet Leg chronology
Wet Leg (2022)	Moisturizer (2025)

Singles from Moisturizer
- 1. "Catch These Fists" Released: 1 April 2025; 2. "CPR" Released: 27 May 2025; 3. "Davina McCall" Released: 23 June 2025; 4. "Mangetout" Released: 11 July 2025

Moisturizer is the second studio album by British rock band Wet Leg, released on 11 July 2025 on Domino Recording Company. Produced by Dan Carey and mixed by Alan Moulder, the album is the band's first to feature guitarist Josh Mobaraki, bass guitarist Ellis Durand and drummer Henry Holmes as full contributing members of Wet Leg, after initially joining as touring members shortly after the band's formation.

Released to widespread critical acclaim, the album reached number one on the UK Albums Chart and was preceded by the singles, "Catch These Fists", "CPR" and "Davina McCall". The album was nominated for Best Alternative Music Album at the 68th Annual Grammy Awards, while "Mangetout" was nominated for Best Alternative Music Performance.

== Background and recording ==
Moisturizer was produced by Dan Carey, who had previously worked with the band on their self-titled debut album, Wet Leg (2022). Moisturizer was recorded in the autumn of 2024 at Salvation Studios in Brighton. Reflecting on the studio environment, frontwoman Rhian Teasdale noted: "[The album] was recorded around Halloween. We decorated the studio and went in there with loads of cobwebs and fake spiders and stuff, so we love Halloween now."

The five-piece band entered the studio with sixteen songs ready to record, with Teasdale noting: "We did drop a few of the punchier ones, because I think it is really important to have that kind of dynamic balance and ebb and flow to make an album sound balanced. It's good to have little palette cleansers. After touring for so long, it was really important to us that the second album would feel good to play live."

== Writing and composition ==
The five-piece band began writing Moisturizer in early 2024, while staying together in an Airbnb in Southwold, Suffolk. Frontwoman Rhian Teasdale praised the collective nature of the writing sessions stating: "It's helped so much, having the five of us writing together, because sometimes I'd go down in the morning and be like: 'I just can't. I don't have anything to give today, nothing sounds like music.' And [bass guitarist] Ellis [Durand] would just be like: 'Don't worry about it, dude.'"

During the writing and recording process, Teasdale's lyrics were influenced by falling in love: "I feel like when you're writing an album, it is like a diary entry or a snapshot in time of where you are. And on a very personal level, it felt important for me to write love songs to my partner, who is not a man — they're non-binary. It feels so different. But I think writing the songs is me just exploring and figuring out how I felt about love. And yeah, I just think queer love in particular is just so interesting to me, because there's no blueprint for it. In the heteronormative sphere, there's so many movies and so many books and, in the media, it's all very straight-leaning. I feel like there are no rules in a queer relationship. There are no rules, no kind of preconceived things that you've subconsciously absorbed along the way — it all gets rewritten when you are in a queer relationship, I think."

The album's first single, "Catch These Fists", was influenced by Teasdale receiving unwanted attention from men during a night out: "I was just out with my friends, as is so often the case. And it's not that the night was a write-off. These situations happen all the time, where you're very clearly out in a very insular circle, dancing with your friends, being silly, and for that to be obnoxiously interrupted by some person trying to pick you up, it's a very common occurrence, and very, very obnoxious. I think I'm conditioned to be so polite about things, but that particular night, I was not very polite."

The album's fourth track and third single, "Davina McCall", is named after English television presenter Davina McCall: "It's a really soppy love song. Me and my partner were watching Big Brother, and I know [McCall] isn't presenting the new one, but it made me think of watching Big Brother as a teenager, and how iconic she was, and that catchphrase: 'I'm coming to get you.' When we were first starting to play shows, she tagged us in a post and she was at a show with a Wet Leg t-shirt on. We were all obviously super-stoked."

The track, "Jennifer's Body", is named after the 2009 comedy horror film, Jennifer's Body, directed by Karyn Kusama: "When we were writing the album at this house in the countryside, we spent the evenings watching a lot of horror films, and Jennifer's Body was one of them. I think I'd watched it when I was a teenager, as someone who thought they were straight. Then seeing it again now, I appreciated it a lot more, obviously. There is this lesbian storyline that's just one of the stories running through it; it's not the story. I think it's a bit more common now to have films with queer romance where that is kind of secondary to the lead storyline, and I think it just really obviously resonated with me a lot more now than I did when I was a teenager.

The track "Don't Speak", written and fronted by guitarist Hester Chambers, was influenced by Chambers' longterm relationship with guitarist Josh Mobaraki.

== Artwork ==
The album's artwork features founding duo Rhian Teasdale and Hester Chambers in an "Aphex Twin-esque" setting, with Teasdale being described as "goblin-like" and Chambers noted for her "long, sharp and deadly looking" nails. Regarding the album's cover, Teasdale stated: "The whole energy of the creative is kind of subversive — like, if there's any moments on there that are a bit sexy, it's also a bit disgusting. Juxtaposition is something that we've always done, from our first video of "Chaise Longue", with the way the music was kind of juxtaposed with the visual. That's something that is always fun to play with."

The album cover was one of the inaugural nominees for Best Album Cover at the 68th Annual Grammy Awards.

== Promotion ==
The album was announced on 1 April 2025 along with its lead single "Catch These Fists" and a tour consisting of 5 dates in the United Kingdom, starting on 21 May at the O2 Academy in Birmingham and ending on 29 May at the O2 Victoria Warehouse in Manchester.

A music video for "Pokemon" was released on December 3, 2025.

== Critical reception ==
Professional ratings
Aggregate scores
Source	Rating
AnyDecentMusic?	8.0/10
Metacritic	84/100
Review scores
Source	Rating
AllMusic	4/5 stars
Clash	8/10
The Daily Telegraph	4/5 stars
DIY	4/5 stars
The Guardian	4/5 stars
NME	4/5 stars
Pitchfork	7.8/10
Rolling Stone	4/5 stars
The Skinny	4/5 stars
Slant Magazine	4/5 stars

Upon release, Moisturizer was met with critical acclaim from music critics. At Metacritic, which aggregates scores from mainstream critics, Moisturizer has an average score of 84 based on 21 reviews, indicating "critical acclaim". Reviewing the album for Clash, Richard Bowes called the album "punchier, prettier, and more playfully perverse" and said it will "undoubtedly help Wet Leg retain their place as one of Britain's most unique bands".

Jamie Wilde of The Skinny said "Moisturizer oozes confidence and Wet Leg continue to play to their strengths in style". Writing for The Guardian, Alexis Petridis wrote "the songs are supremely punchy, the tunes contagious: Moisturizer is a blast". Rob Sheffield of Rolling Stone said the album "keeps everything fast and frisky". Reviewing the album for Slant, Jeremy Winograd said the band sounded like a "real live rock band playing in a room together" and noted "how much fun they sound like they're having on Moisturizer".

Writing for Pitchfork, Aimee Cliff labelled Moisturizer a "near-reinvention" of the band's image compared to their debut, featuring a "meatier, more expansive sound" and an emotionality suffused "with all the anxious joy of second adolescence". Cliff's review concludes by noting that the record displays "the staying power of a band that will outlast a sense of novelty", enabling them to provide nuance to the "brazen humor" they broke through with. The deluxe edition, released in July 2026, was praised for showing their excellence as a live band.

== Commercial performance ==
Moisturizer debuted atop the UK Albums and the UK Independent Albums charts selling 26,014 units in its first week.

== Track listing ==
Moisturizer track listing
No.	Title	Writer(s)	Length
1.	"CPR"	Ellis Durand; Rhian Teasdale	2:50
2.	"Liquidize"	Joshua Mobaraki; Teasdale	2:27
3.	"Catch These Fists"	Durand; Teasdale	3:08
4.	"Davina McCall"	Durand; Hester Chambers; Teasdale	3:47
5.	"Jennifer's Body"	Chambers; Durand; Henry Holmes; Mobaraki; Teasdale	2:26
6.	"Mangetout"	Mobaraki; Teasdale	3:24
7.	"Pond Song"	Chambers	2:58
8.	"Pokemon"	Mobaraki; Teasdale	3:26
9.	"Pillow Talk"	Durand; Teasdale	2:56
10.	"Don't Speak"	Chambers	3:13
11.	"11:21"	Durand; Teasdale	3:46
12.	"U and Me at Home"	Mobaraki; Teasdale	4:01
Total length:			38:22

=== Note ===
- All track titles except "CPR" are stylized in all lowercase.

== Personnel ==
Credits adapted from Tidal.

=== Wet Leg ===
- Hester Chambers – guitar (all tracks), background vocals (tracks 1, 4–6, 8, 12), lead vocals (7, 10), synthesizer (8), electric piano (9), tin whistle (11)
- Ellis Durand – bass guitar (all tracks), piano (9), background vocals (12)
- Henry Holmes – drums, percussion (all tracks); background vocals (12)
- Joshua Mobaraki – guitar (1–7, 9, 10, 12), synthesizer (7, 8), keyboards (11), background vocals (12)
- Rhian Teasdale – lead vocals (1–9, 11, 12), guitar (3), background vocals (10)

=== Additional contributors ===
- Dan Carey – production (all tracks), synthesizer (1, 9)
- Matt Colton – mastering
- Alan Moulder – mixing
- Alexis Smith – engineering
- Jake Stainer – engineering
- Finn Howells – mix engineering
- Adele Phillips – engineering assistance
- Lewis Foord – engineering assistance

=== Additional credits ===
- Iris Luz – cover artwork
- Hester Chambers – artwork on reverse
- Wet Leg and Matt De Jong and Jamie-James Medina – Packaging design
- Jordan Whitmore and Laurence Bell – A&R
- Elena Pelse and Martin Hall – Management

== Charts ==
=== Weekly charts ===
Weekly chart performance for Moisturizer
Chart (2025)	Peak position
Australian Albums (ARIA)	4
Austrian Albums (Ö3 Austria)	7
Belgian Albums (Ultratop Flanders)	3
Croatian International Albums (HDU)	1
Belgian Albums (Ultratop Wallonia)	15
Dutch Albums (Album Top 100)	6
French Albums (SNEP)	40
German Albums (Offizielle Top 100)	10
Irish Albums (Official Charts)	22
Irish Independent Albums (IRMA)	2
Japanese Albums (Oricon)	50
Japanese Rock Albums (Oricon)	8
Japanese Top Albums Sales (Billboard Japan)	60
New Zealand Albums (RMNZ)	8
Portuguese Albums (AFP)	29
Scottish Albums (Official Charts)	2
Spanish Albums (PROMUSICAE)	51
Swiss Albums (Schweizer Hitparade)	10
UK Albums (Official Charts)	1
UK Independent Albums (Official Charts)	1
US Billboard 200	45
US Independent Albums (Billboard)	6
US Top Rock & Alternative Albums (Billboard)	6

=== Year-end charts ===
Year-end chart performance for Moisturizer
Chart (2025)	Position
Croatian International Albums (HDU)	12

== Certifications ==
Certifications for Moisturizer
Region	Certification	Certified units/sales
United Kingdom (BPI)	Silver	60,000^{‡}
^{‡} Sales+streaming figures based on certification alone.
