= Wet Leg =

British indie rock band

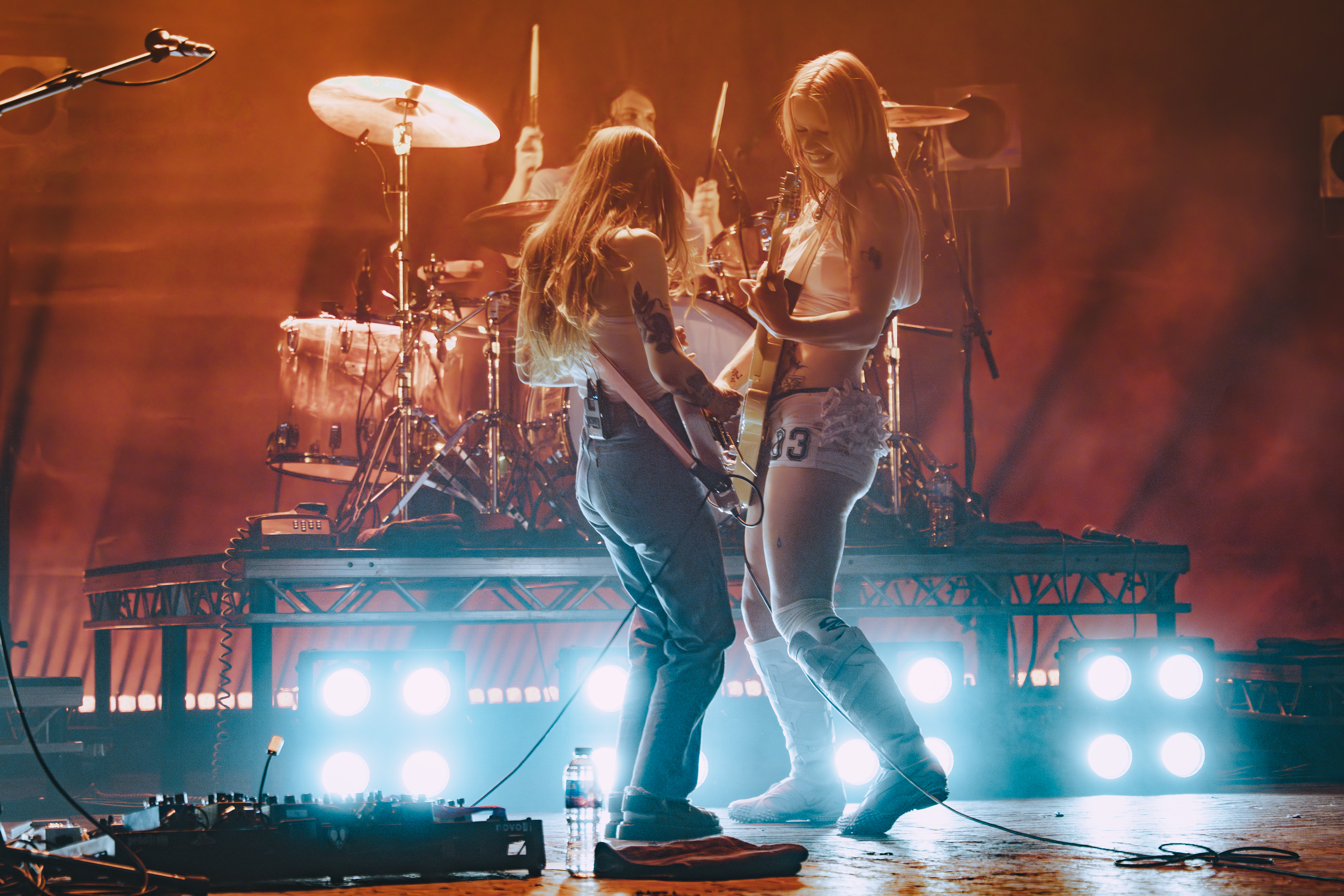
- Wet Leg performing in 2025

Background information
- Origin: Isle of Wight, England
- Genres: Indie rock; crank wave; post-punk revival; indie pop
- Years active: 2019–present
- Label: Domino
- Members: Rhian Teasdale; Hester Chambers; Henry Holmes; Josh Mobaraki; Ellis Durand
- Past members: Doug Richards
- Website: wetlegband.com

Wet Leg are an English indie rock band from the Isle of Wight, founded in 2019 by Rhian Teasdale (vocals, guitar) and Hester Chambers (guitar). The band also includes Josh Mobaraki (guitar, keyboards), Ellis Durand (bass) and Henry Holmes (drums).

Initially a duo, Teasdale and Chambers debuted with the single, "Chaise Longue", in 2021. Their self-titled debut album debuted in 2022 at number one on the UK Albums Chart and Australia's ARIA Albums Chart. The album was shortlisted for the 2022 Mercury Prize. At the 65th Annual Grammy Awards, Wet Leg won Best Alternative Music Album for their debut and Best Alternative Music Performance for "Chaise Longue", and were nominated for Best New Artist. They also won Best New Artist and Best British Group at the 2023 Brit Awards.

The band's second studio album, Moisturizer (2025), was written and recorded as a five-piece, with former touring members Mobaraki, Durand and Holmes all becoming core members of the band. Released to critical acclaim, the album debuted at number one on the UK Albums Chart.

Wet Leg have cited various bands and artists as influences, including Bombay Bicycle Club, PJ Harvey, the White Stripes, the Strokes, and Kings of Leon.

== History ==
=== Early lives and formation ===
Merseyside-born Teasdale moved from Formby to the Isle of Wight when she was eight. She performed for many years on the Isle of Wight as a musician and pianist, and prior to forming Wet Leg was known as RHAIN and was linked to the music scene in Bristol. As RHAIN, Teasdale performed her song "Humdrum Drivel" in 2013. In 2014, she was photographed by Cosmopolitan magazine while attending the Isle of Wight music festival.

Teasdale and Chambers first met at the stage school 'Platform One College of Music' on the Isle of Wight while studying. After ten years of friendship, they formed a band in 2019 under the name Wet Leg, and later signed with Domino Recording Company. Several different explanations have been given for how the band got their name: in a December 2021 interview, they said that they chose the name by picking different emoji combinations; in an April 2022 YouTube interview, the band said it came from an Isle of Wight slang to describe non-locals on the island—who had crossed the Solent were said to have a "wet leg" from getting off the boat. Former drummer Doug Richards, in a July 2023 interview, alleged that the name stemmed from a list of "stupid band names" that was added to "any time you’d think of a funny combination of words". He further alleged that the original "stupid band name" was Wet Book, but was misheard as Wet Leg.

=== 2021–2024: Debut album ===
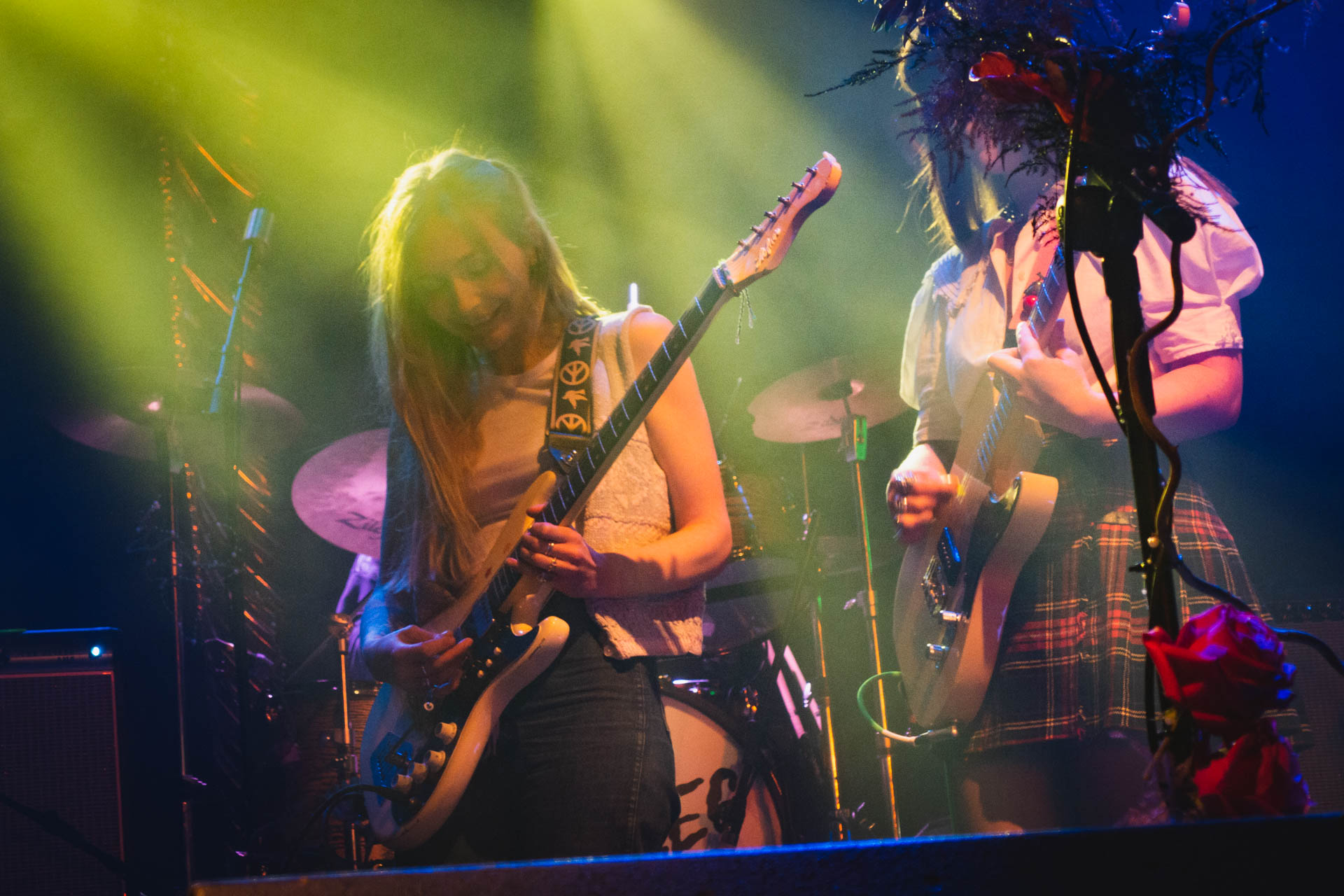
Playing at the Electric Ballroom in 2022

The band's debut single, "Chaise Longue", was released on 15 June 2021, and gained media notice for earning millions of streams and video views. Their second single, "Wet Dream", was released on 28 September 2021. Variety noted, "It's rare that a new group releases two songs and they're both great". They appeared on Later... with Jools Holland on BBC2, on 30 October 2021. On 29 November 2021, they announced their debut self-titled album, released on 8 April 2022 via Domino. The same day, Wet Leg released the double-single "Too Late Now" / "Oh No".

In 2022, they toured the UK playing songs from their first album. It was then announced that they would tour Australia and New Zealand as the support band for Harry Styles's Oceanic leg of Love On Tour in 2023. Wet Leg appeared on Later... with Jools Holland in November 2021 and returned for the first part of his next series in May 2022.

In an interview with Andrew Ford of ABC in Australia in July 2022, Wet Leg clarified that a comment about a completed second album in a previous interview was "a big joke". "We haven't got a second album; we haven't had any time to write".

Wet Leg received their first three nominations at the 65th Annual Grammy Awards, including Best New Artist, Best Alternative Music Performance for "Chaise Longue" and Best Alternative Music Album, winning the latter two awards They also won Best New Artist and Group of the Year at the Brit Awards 2023 where they performed "Chaise Longue" with the prog Morris dance troupe Boss Morris and their Morris beasts.

Wet Leg performed at Coachella in April 2023, where they were joined on-stage by Dave Grohl during their performance of "Ur Mum".

On 6 July 2023, Wet Leg remixed Depeche Mode's track "Wagging Tongue", the second single from their Memento Mori album. The track earned them the Grammy Award for Best Remixed Recording, Non-Classical at the 66th Annual Grammy Awards.

=== 2025–present: Moisturizer ===
In March 2025, Wet Leg posted a new photo on their Instagram account with the caption "We're so back", indicating that the band was set to return with new music. Later that month, the band played a secret show under the name Uma Thurman at the Green Door Store in Brighton, during which they performed seven unreleased songs. The band's single, "Catch These Fists", was released on 1 April 2025, coinciding with the announcement of their second album Moisturizer, released on 11 July. The band were referred to in the album's press materials as "the Isle of Wight five-piece", indicating that long-serving touring musicians Henry Holmes, Josh Mobaraki and Ellis Durand had been formally inducted into the band as official members after four years together. Alongside the release of "Catch These Fists" they announced a UK tour and a North America tour on their Instagram.

In December 2025, their song "Mangetout" was featured in the opening of episode two of the television show Heated Rivalry. Streaming of the song increased by 61% in the days after the episode's release. On 21 March 2026, they were the first musical guest on the debut of Saturday Night Live UK, in which they performed "Catch These Fists" and "Mangetout".

== Members ==
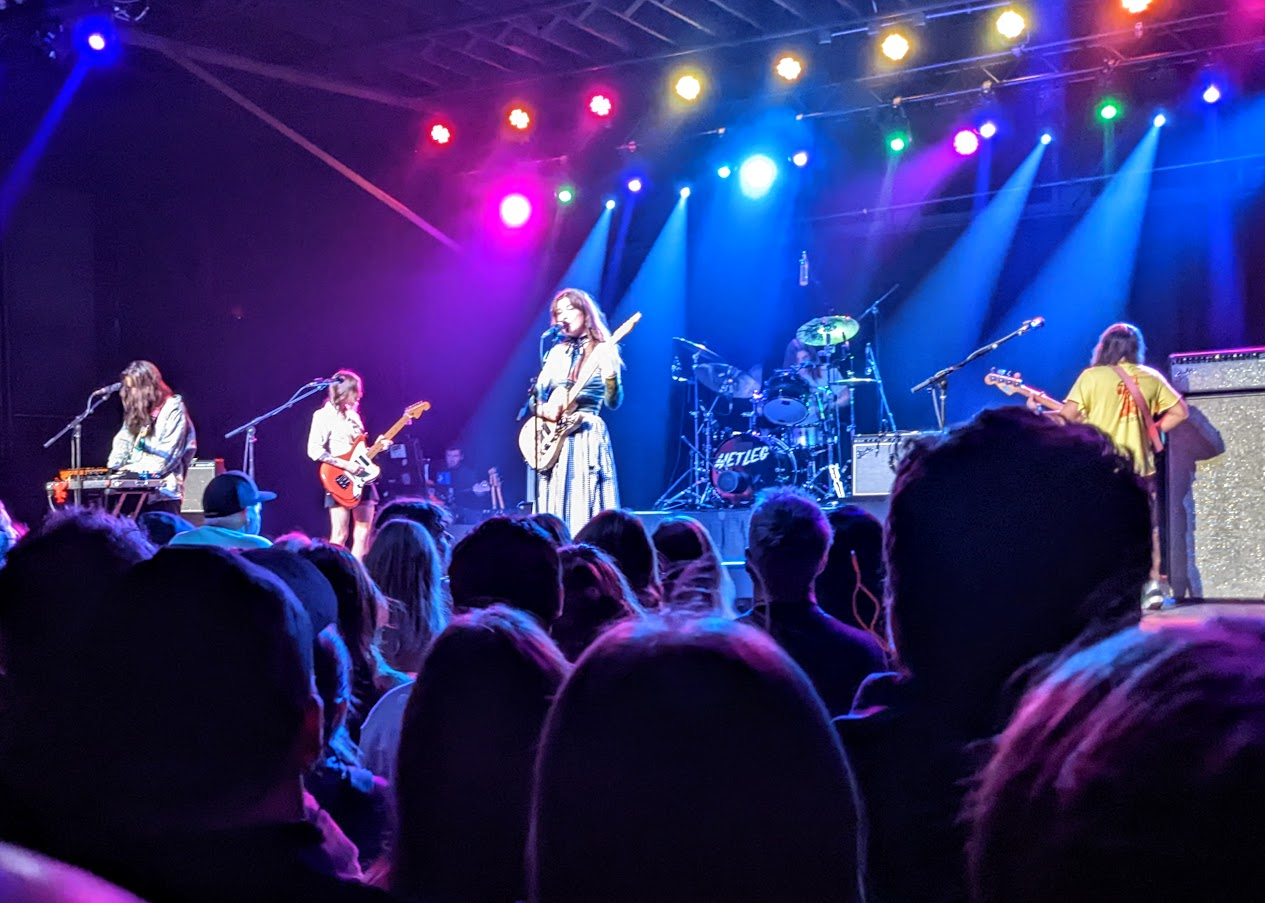
Wet Leg performing at The Truman in Kansas City on 6 December 2022

Current members

- Rhian Teasdale – vocals, guitars (2019–present)
- Hester Chambers – guitars, vocals (2019–present)
- Henry Holmes – drums, percussion, backing vocals (2024–present; touring musician 2020–2023)
- Josh Mobaraki – guitars, keyboards, backing vocals (2024–present; touring musician 2020–2023)
- Ellis Durand – bass guitar, backing vocals (2024–present; touring musician 2021–2023)

Former members

- Doug Richards – drums, percussion (2019–2020)

Former touring musicians

- Michael Champion – bass guitar (2019–2021)

== Discography ==
Wet Leg discography
- Studio albums: 2
- EPs: 1
- Singles: 9
- Music videos: 9

=== Studio albums ===
List of studio albums, with release date and label shown
Title	Album details	Peak chart positions										Certifications
Title	Album details	UK	AUS	GER	IRE	JPN	NLD	NZ	SWE	SWI	US	Certifications
Wet Leg	Released: 8 April 2022; Label: Domino; Formats: CD, DD, LP, CS	1	1	8	4	64	10	4	59	11	14	BPI: Gold; RMNZ: Gold
Moisturizer	Released: 11 July 2025; Label: Domino; Formats: CD, DD, LP, CS	1	4	10	22	50	6	8	—	10	45	BPI: Silver

=== Extended plays ===
Title	Details
Apple Music Home Session: Wet Leg	Released: 4 February 2022; Label: Domino; Formats: Streaming

=== Singles ===
Title	Year	Peak chart positions										Certifications	Album
Title	Year	UK	UK Indie	COL Ang. Air.	EST Air.	JPN Over.	NZ Hot	US AAA	US Alt.	US Rock	US Rock Air.	Certifications	Album
"Chaise Longue"	2021	74	13	—	—	—	—	18	15	—	21	BPI: Gold; RMNZ: Gold	Wet Leg
"Wet Dream"	2021	74	7	—	—	19	—	—	25	—	36	BPI: Platinum; RIAA: Gold; RMNZ: Gold	Wet Leg
"Too Late Now"	2021	—	—	—	—	—	—	35	—	—	—		Wet Leg
"Oh No"	2021	—	—	—	—	—	—	—	—	—	—		Wet Leg
"Angelica"	2022	—	38	—	—	—	—	—	22	—	41		Wet Leg
"Ur Mum"	2022	—	46	—	—	—	—	—	—	—	—		Wet Leg
"Catch These Fists"	2025	99	39	10	88	15	—	2	7	—	9		Moisturizer
"CPR"	2025	— (Note: "CPR" did not enter the UK Singles Chart, however it peaked at number 15 on the UK Singles Sales Chart.)	—	—	85	—	—	—	—	—	—		Moisturizer
"Davina McCall"	2025	—	—	—	—	13	—	—	—	—	—		Moisturizer
"Mangetout"	2025	—	—	—	62	—	37	4	2	32	14		Moisturizer
"Hi From Me"	2026	—	—	—	—	—	—	—	—	—	—		Moisturizer (Deluxe)
"—" denotes a recording that did not chart or was not released in that territory. "*" denotes the chart did not exist at that time.

=== Other charted songs ===
Title	Year	Peak chart positions	Album
Title	Year	EST Air.	Album
"Pokemon"	2025	77	Moisturizer

=== Music videos ===
Title	Year	Album	Director
"Chaise Longue"	2021	Wet Leg	Wet Leg
"Wet Dream"	2021	Wet Leg	Wet Leg
"Too Late Now"	2021	Wet Leg	Fred Rowson
"Oh No"	2022	Wet Leg	Wet Leg
"Angelica"	2022	Wet Leg	Wet Leg
"Ur Mum"	2022	Wet Leg	Lavaland
"Catch These Fists"	2025	Moisturizer	Wet Leg
"CPR"	2025	Moisturizer	Wet Leg
"Davina McCall"	2025	Moisturizer	Chris Hopewell
"Mangetout"	2025	Moisturizer	Wet Leg
"Pokemon"	2025	Moisturizer	Elliott Arndt

== Tours ==
Headlining

- UK and US Tour (2022)
- "Moistourizer" UK, US and Europe Tour (2025)

Supporting

- Love On Tour - Inglewood, Australia, New Zealand and Europe.
- Everything or Nothing at All Tour - Manchester and London.

== Accolades ==
Year	Award	Category	Work	Result	Ref.
2022	Libera Awards	Breakthrough Artist/Release	"Chaise Longue"	Won	
2022	Libera Awards	Video of the Year	"Chaise Longue"	Won	
2022	Libera Awards	Best Sync Usage	"Chaise Longue" in Gossip Girl episode 5	Nominated	
2022	AIM Independent Music Awards	UK Independent Breakthrough	Wet Leg	Won	
2022	AIM Independent Music Awards	PPL Award for Most Played New Independent Artist	Wet Leg	Nominated	
2022	AIM Independent Music Awards	Best Independent Track	"Chaise Longue"	Nominated	
2022	MTV Video Music Awards	Push Performance of the Year	"Chaise Longue"	Nominated	
2022	Mercury Prize	Album of the Year	Wet Leg	Nominated	
2022	UK Music Video Awards	Best Rock Video - Newcomer	"Ur Mum"	Nominated	
2022	UK Music Video Awards	Best Rock Video - Newcomer	"Wet Dream"	Nominated	
2022	MTV Europe Music Awards	Best Push	Wet Leg	Nominated	
2023	Grammy Awards	Best New Artist	Wet Leg	Nominated	
2023	Grammy Awards	Best Alternative Music Performance	"Chaise Longue"	Won	
2023	Grammy Awards	Best Alternative Music Album	Wet Leg	Won	
2023	Brit Awards	British Album of the Year	Wet Leg	Nominated	
2023	Brit Awards	Best New Artist	Wet Leg	Won	
2023	Brit Awards	Best British Group	Wet Leg	Won	
2023	Brit Awards	Best British Rock/Alternative Act	Wet Leg	Nominated	
2023	Ivor Novello Awards	Songwriter of the Year	Rhian Teasdale and Hester Chambers	Won	
2023	Libera Awards	Record of the Year	Wet Leg	Won	
2023	Libera Awards	Best Alternative Rock Record	Wet Leg	Won	
2023	Libera Awards	Marketing Genius	Wet Leg	Won	
2023	Libera Awards	Best Live/Livestream Act	US Tour 2022	Nominated	
2023	Libera Awards	Best Remix	"Too Late Now (Soulwax Remix)"	Won	
2023	Libera Awards	Video of the Year	"Ur Mum"	Won	
2024	Grammy Awards	Best Remixed Recording, Non-Classical	"Wagging Tongue (Wet Leg Remix)"	Won	
2026	Grammy Awards	Best Alternative Music Performance	"Mangetout"	Nominated	
2026	Grammy Awards	Best Alternative Music Album	Moisturizer	Nominated	
2026	Grammy Awards	Best Album Cover	Moisturizer	Nominated	
2026	BRIT Awards	British Group	Wet Leg	Nominated	
2026	BRIT Awards	Best Alternative/Rock Act	Moisturizer	Nominated	
