= Wet Leg (album) =

Studio album by Wet Leg
- Released: 8 April 2022
- Recorded: April 2021
- Studios: Mr. Dan's; Jon McMullen's studio (London); Hester Chambers' flat; Joshua Mobaraki's flat (Isle of Wight)
- Genres: Indie rock; post-punk revival; Britpop; pop-punk; indie pop
- Length: 36:47
- Label: Domino
- Producers: Dan Carey; Jon McMullen; Joshua Mobaraki

Wet Leg chronology
Wet Leg (2022)	Moisturizer (2025)

Singles from Wet Leg
- 1. "Chaise Longue" Released: 15 June 2021; 2. "Wet Dream" Released: 28 September 2021; 3. "Too Late Now" Released: 29 November 2021; 4. "Oh No" Released: 29 November 2021; 5. "Angelica" Released: 28 February 2022; 6. "Ur Mum" Released: 4 April 2022

Wet Leg is the debut studio album by British rock duo Wet Leg, released on 8 April 2022 by Domino. It was promoted by the viral hit "Chaise Longue", followed by the singles "Wet Dream", "Too Late Now", "Oh No", "Angelica", and "Ur Mum". The album received acclaim from music critics, topped the charts in Australia and the United Kingdom, and entered the top ten charts in Belgium, Germany, Ireland, the Netherlands and New Zealand. It was shortlisted for the 2022 Mercury Prize and it won the Grammy for Best Alternative Music Album at the 65th Annual Grammy Awards and nominated for Album of the Year at the 2023 Brit Awards.

== Recording ==
Wet Leg was recorded in April 2021, before the band had even played live, with Speedy Wunderground's Dan Carey acting as main producer.

== Promotion ==
Wet Leg released their debut single "Chaise Longue" on 15 June 2021. The song earned the band acclaim from various magazines after it went viral online. They followed it up with "Wet Dream" on 28 September 2021 with a "surreal" self-directed video. "Wet Dream" was sent to alternative radio in the United States on 19 April 2022.

The duo released the double singles "Too Late Now" and "Oh No" on 29 November 2021, alongside a sci-fi video for the former track and the announcement of the album's release date, tracklist, and tour dates. "Oh No" received a music video 1 February 2022, while "Too Late Now" was sent to adult alternative radio in the United States on 7 February 2022. "Angelica" and "Ur Mum" were released as the fifth and sixth singles on 28 February and 4 April 2022, respectively.

The band toured the album across North America and Europe in 2022.

== Composition ==
Primarily an indie rock, post-punk, alternative rock, Britpop, post-punk revival, indie pop, and punk pop album, Wet Leg takes influence from a variety of other genres, particularly '90s and '00s indie and garage pop.

"Being in Love" is an indie pop, wonky pop, and bubblegum grunge-pop song with post-punk riffs, a synth-rock groove, and art pop influences. "Chaise Longue" is a post-punk and garage punk song wherein Teasdale "intone[s] a series of non sequiturs – from suggestive Mean Girls quotes ('would you like us to assign someone to butter your muffin?') to suggestive allusions to academia" in a deadpan voice. "Angelica" is a psychedelic pop and slacker rock song with "ethereal, dreamy harmonies amid distorted guitars" about "a woman miserably going through the motions at a party". "I Don't Wanna Go Out" is a psychedelic and grunge song that lifts the riff from David Bowie's "The Man Who Sold the World". "Wet Dream" is an indie rock and surf rock song with disco handclaps, "a big, shout-along chorus", "a looping bassline and propulsive beat". Long-time guitarist Joshua Mobaraki co-wrote the song. Teasdale sings about an ex who texts her when she appears in his wet dreams, as well as doing other increasingly ridiculous things like "exposing himself on the side of the road, climbing onto the hood of her car, licking the windshield." The song references the film Buffalo '66 in the line "Baby do you want to come home with me; I've got Buffalo '66 on DVD". "Convincing", the only song Hester Chambers sings lead on, is a psychedelic folk, folk-pop, glam rock, and ethereal song influenced by lounge music that "finds [Chambers] in a rut of sadness, not ready to start digging herself out". "Loving You" is a country pop ballad sung in falsetto that "details the breakdown of a relationship and the painful aftermath of seeing an ex moving on with someone else". "Ur Mum" is a surf rock-inspired pop song that sees Teasdale "calling out a former lover, asking them to forget her", culminating in Teasdale "announcing that she’s been practicing her 'loudest scream,' counting to three before letting out a screech." "Oh No" is a glam rock and glam punk song with "fuzzed-out guitars" about doomscrolling and smartphone anxiety. The folk-tinged "Piece of Shit" "compares a full-of-themselves partner to excrement in the toilet bowl" and incorporates "computer game blips". "Supermarket" is a slacker rock song influenced by first-wave British punk that tells a story about being stoned while shopping. "Too Late Now" is an atmospheric, experimental post-rock and guitar pop song that features "a gratifyingly relatable self-doubt break, when the music drops out to allow Teasdale to document her existential angst as it spreads into the track she is currently performing".

== Critical reception ==
Professional ratings
Aggregate scores
Source	Rating
AnyDecentMusic?	8.1/10
Metacritic	87/100
Review scores
Source	Rating
AllMusic	4/5 stars
And It Don't Stop	A
Clash	9/10
The Guardian	4/5 stars
The Independent	4/5 stars
NME	5/5 stars
The Observer	3/5 stars
Paste	8.0/10
Pitchfork	7.2/10
Rolling Stone	4/5 stars

Wet Leg received widespread acclaim from music critics upon its release. On Metacritic, the album has an average score of 87 out of 100 based on 27 reviews, indicating "universal acclaim". Reviewing the album for AllMusic, Heather Phares claimed that "It's rare that a band is so fully formed at the start of their career, but on their self-titled debut album, Wet Leg deliver more of those immediately memorable hooks and relatable, witty retorts." Clash writer Robin Murray called it "the most infectious, alluring, irresistible, and downright fun debut record that’s come our way in a long, long time". In a five-star review for DIY, Lisa Wright praised the band's unique personality, saying "it’s the slightly wonky worldview of the band themselves that really elevates Wet Leg into the realms of the truly special. Don’t be fooled by the prairie dresses and sweetly innocent vocal delivery, Rhian has bite and gleefully revels in a rude one liner."

In another five-star review for NME, Rhian Daly called it an "instant classic" and "It rushes with liberating, infectious joy that makes you want to grab your own partner-in-crime and speed off on an adventure to find somewhere that’s, as "Angelica"'s mantra suggests, is 'good times all the time'." Rachel Aroesti of The Guardian called Wet Leg a "collection of 90s and 00s-era indie that is by turns dreamy, lush, hooky and thunderous, and layered with lyrics saturated with millennial disaffection, anxiety and overwhelm." The Independent writer Annabel Nugent said that "In vocals that vacillate between taunting melody and rage, Teasdale and Chambers speak to their twenty-something peers in a language they know: work is dull, dating apps are awful, parties aren’t as fun as they used to be, death is (thankfully?) inevitable". Rob Sheffield of Rolling Stone said that "All told, Wet Leg are a couple of artsy rock & rollers who want too much, feel too much, hate too much, while chasing too many good times. No wonder the world was so ready to fall madly in love with them. After two years of quarantine blues, there was just a widespread cultural craving for this kind of action, and Wet Leg were as surprised as anyone when they tapped into it. But the album makes it sound like they're just getting started." Paste contributor Eric R. Danton said "Their songwriting is tight, their lyrics are brazen, smart and amusing, and they are at ease shifting through various indie styles. What really makes Wet Leg stand out, though, is that Teasdale and Chambers are so clearly having fun."

In a more mixed review Kitty Empire, selecting it as her Observer Album of the Week, nevertheless expressed disappointment at the album's mundanity, stating "Wet Leg’s unself-conscious art seemed initially to foreground the ridiculousness of everything (especially weird stains). Their album, by contrast, drills down hard into how rubbish exes are. Relatable, of course, understandable too, but perhaps not what was originally indicated by those lobster claws."

Showbiz by PS included the album in its list of the best albums of the 2020s so far, placing it at number 14, while Treblezine ranked it at number 44 on a similar list.

Wet Leg are the first band from the Isle of Wight to achieve a UK number 1 album.

=== Year-end lists ===
Publication	Rank	List
BrooklynVegan	44	Top 50 Albums of 2022
NPR	31	The 50 Best Albums of 2022
The Independent	19	The Best Albums of 2022
Slant Magazine	17	The 50 Best Albums of 2022
Billboard	10	The 50 Best Albums of 2022
Rolling Stone	10	The 100 Best Albums of 2022
Entertainment Weekly	9	The 10 Best Albums of 2022
Uncut	7	Uncut's Best New Albums of 2022
Flood Magazine	6	The Best Albums of 2022
Exclaim!	5	Exclaim!'s 50 Best Albums of 2022
Paste	4	The Best Albums of 2022
The Atlantic	3	The 10 Best Albums of 2022
Far Out	3	The 50 Best Albums of 2022
NME	2	The 50 Best Albums of 2022
Pitchfork	N/A	The 38 Best Rock Albums of 2022
Guitar World	20	The Best Guitar Albums of 2022

=== Accolades ===
Grammy Awards for Wet Leg
Grammy Awards
Year	Nominated work	Category	Result	Ref.
2023	"Chaise Longue"	Best Alternative Music Performance	Won	
2023	Wet Leg	Best Alternative Music Album	Won	

== Commercial performance ==
The album debuted atop the UK Albums Chart, including the UK Independent Albums chart with 28,972 units in its first week of release.

In the US, the album debuted at number 14 on the Billboard 200, including number 3 on the Independent Albums, Top Alternative Albums and Top Rock Albums charts with 18,500 pure album sales.

== Track listing ==
Wet Leg track listing
No.	Title	Writer(s)	Producer(s)	Length
1.	"Being in Love"	Rhian Teasdale	Dan Carey	2:02
2.	"Chaise Longue"	Teasdale; Hester Chambers; Joshua Mobaraki	Jon McMullen	3:19
3.	"Angelica"	Teasdale; Chambers	Mobaraki	3:52
4.	"I Don't Wanna Go Out"	Teasdale	Carey	3:41
5.	"Wet Dream"	Teasdale; Chambers; Mobaraki	Carey	2:20
6.	"Convincing"	Teasdale; Chambers	Carey	2:37
7.	"Loving You"	Teasdale	Carey	3:39
8.	"Ur Mum"	Teasdale	Carey	3:21
9.	"Oh No"	Teasdale	Carey	2:29
10.	"Piece of Shit"	Teasdale	Carey	2:48
11.	"Supermarket"	Teasdale; Chambers	Carey	3:10
12.	"Too Late Now"	Teasdale; Chambers; Michael Champion	Carey	3:29
Total length:				36:47

Deluxe edition bonus 7-inch vinyl & Japanese edition (bonus tracks)
No.	Title	Writer(s)	Producer(s)	Length
13.	"It's Not Fun"	Chambers	Carey	2:49
14.	"It's a Shame"	Teasdale	Carey	3:33
Total length:				6:22

French limited edition (bonus tracks)
No.	Title	Producer(s)	Length
15.	"Chaise Longue (French Version)"	McMullen
Total length:			3:17

== Personnel ==
=== Wet Leg ===
- Rhian Teasdale – lead vocals, rhythm guitar
- Hester Chambers – lead guitar, backing vocals

=== Other musicians ===
- Joshua Mobaraki – rhythm guitar
- Michael Champion – bass
- Henry Holmes – drums, backing vocals
- Dan Carey – synthesizer and synthesizer programming (all tracks except "Chaise Longue")
- Jon McMullen – synthesizer and programming (on "Chaise Longue")

=== Technical ===
- Alexis Smith – engineering (except "Angelica" and "Chaise Longue")
- Joshua Mobaraki – production, engineering (on "Angelica")
- Jon McMullen – engineering (on "Chaise Longue")
- Alan Moulder – mixing
- Matt Colton – mastering
- Julian Hanson – photography
- Matthew Cooper – graphic design

== Charts ==
=== Weekly charts ===
Weekly chart performance for Wet Leg
Chart (2022)	Peak position
Australian Albums (ARIA)	1
Austrian Albums (Ö3 Austria)	16
Belgian Albums (Ultratop Flanders)	6
Belgian Albums (Ultratop Wallonia)	16
Canadian Albums (Billboard)	82
Dutch Albums (Album Top 100)	10
German Albums (Offizielle Top 100)	8
Irish Albums (IRMA)	4
Japanese Albums (Oricon)	64
New Zealand Albums (RMNZ)	4
Portuguese Albums (AFP)	3
Scottish Albums (Official Charts)	1
Spanish Albums (PROMUSICAE)	56
Swedish Albums (Sverigetopplistan)	59
Swiss Albums (Schweizer Hitparade)	11
UK Albums (Official Charts)	1
UK Independent Albums (Official Charts)	1
US Billboard 200	14
US Independent Albums (Billboard)	3
US Top Alternative Albums (Billboard)	3
US Top Rock Albums (Billboard)	3

=== Year-end charts ===
Year-end chart performance for Wet Leg
Chart (2022)	Position
Belgian Albums (Ultratop Flanders)	196
UK Albums (OCC)	50

== Certifications ==
Certifications and sales for Wet Leg
Region	Certification	Certified units/sales
New Zealand (RMNZ)	Gold	7,500^{‡}
United Kingdom (BPI)	Gold	100,000^{‡}
^{‡} Sales+streaming figures based on certification alone.

== See also ==
- List of number-one albums of 2022 (Australia)
- List of UK Albums Chart number ones of the 2020s
- List of UK Album Downloads Chart number ones of the 2020s
- List of UK Independent Albums Chart number ones of 2022
