= Too Late Now =

Single by Wet Leg

from the album Wet Leg
- A-side: "Oh No"
- Released: 29 November 2021
- Genre: Dream pop; indie rock; grunge
- Length: 3:29
- Label: Domino
- Songwriters: Rhian Teasdale; Hester Chambers; Michael Champion
- Producer: Dan Carey

Wet Leg singles chronology
"Wet Dream" (2021)	"Too Late Now" / "Oh No" (2021)	"Angelica" (2022)

Official video
- "Too Late Now" on YouTube

"Too Late Now" is a song by English indie rock duo Wet Leg. It was written by both members of the band, Rhian Teasdale and Hester Chambers, with bassist Michael Champion. As for most of their debut album, the track was produced by Dan Carey.

It was released alongside its double A-side "Oh No" on 29 November 2021 through Domino as the third single from their eponymous debut album.

The following year, the song was remixed by Belgian electronic rock band Soulwax. This version was nominated for the Grammy Award for Best Remixed Recording, Non-Classical at the 65th Annual Grammy Awards.

== Background and composition ==
"Too Late Now" has been described as a bait-and-switch because it opens with a post-punk riff that does not ignite. The song begins with a guitar and a bass before a simple kick beat is incorporated. Right before the first verse, the drums switch to a more complex pattern. It starts slowly and crescendos toward a satisfying climax. Chris DeVille of Stereogum called the track a "slow-building powerhouse".

Different musical techniques are used throughout the song, including artificial reverb in the chorus and delay applied to the snare drum. The instruments occasionally drop out so that the focus switches to the vocals. The songwriting is clear and simple, encapsulating the everyday life of adulthood. The duo's guitarist Hester Chambers provides backing vocals while main vocalist Rhian Teasdale performs the song with the same detached semi-speak technique she had been using for the band's previous singles.

Ethan Spivey of WRLT said that "Too Late Now" is "dream pop or rock externally, but reads more like grunge music". Alisha Sweeney of KVOQ included it on the list of her ten favorite songs of 2022.

== Promotion ==
The band performed the song during their Tiny Desk (Home) Concert, alongside "Chaise Longue", "Wet Dream" and "Oh No". Their performance was released on 1 December 2021. It intersperses VHS clips with footage captured on modern cameras, as a nod to their sound which is inspired by the 70s. They chose to perform "Too Late Now" on American TV for their appearance on The Late Late Show with James Corden on 31 March 2022.

== Music video ==
The music video for "Too Late Now" was directed by Fred Rowson, unlike Wet Leg's first two music videos which were self-directed. In the video, which features science fiction elements, both member of the duo are zapped onto the empty roof of a parking garage, quickly followed by three men. All dressed in spa robes, they wander in crowded streets and lush countrysides.

== Soulwax remix ==
A remix of "Too Late Now" by Belgian electronic rock band Soulwax was released on 6 July 2022. It was also released as a twelve-inch single through Deewee on 22 July 2022. This version features arpeggio synths, 808 drums and vocal chops.

Tyler Golsen of Far Out thought that the Soulwax remix sounded more like a new song than a remix. He rated it 6.6/10, saying that the "only recognisable element of the original version of the song is Rhian Teasdale’s vocals, which are chopped up, pitch modulated, and transformed within an entirely new composition". Winnie Litchfield of American Songwriter expressed the opposite feeling, stating that this remix gives the song a tech house feel while keeping the original flavor of the song.

It was nominated for the Grammy Award for Best Remixed Recording, Non-Classical at the 65th Annual Grammy Awards.

== Charts ==
Chart performance for "Too Late Now"
Chart (2022)	Peak position
US Adult Alternative Airplay (Billboard)	35
