= The Latin Project =

The Latin Project was a collaboration between Jez Colin and Matt Cooper, a pair of British DJs/remixers/producers who collaborated with various artists from the world of Latin music. Their 2003 track, Lei Lo Lai, which featured Freddie Crespo on vocals, went to #1 on the Billboard Hot Dance Music/Club Play chart and was nominated for a Grammy in 2004 for Best Dance Recording. They were active until 2009.

== See also ==
- List of number-one dance hits (United States)
- List of artists who reached number one on the US Dance chart
