= Wet Dream (Wet Leg song) =

Single by Wet Leg

from the album Wet Leg
- Released: 28 September 2021
- Genre: Indie rock
- Length: 2:20
- Label: Domino
- Songwriters: Rhian Teasdale; Hester Chambers; Joshua Mobaraki
- Producer: Dan Carey

Wet Leg singles chronology
"Chaise Longue" (2021)	"Wet Dream" (2021)	"Too Late Now" / "Oh No" (2021)

Official video
- "Wet Dream" on YouTube

"Wet Dream" is a song by English indie rock duo Wet Leg. It was written by singer-guitarists Rhian Teasdale and Hester Chambers, along with guitarist Joshua Mobaraki, and produced by Dan Carey. It was released through Domino on 28 September 2021 as the second single from their debut album Wet Leg.

== Background and composition ==
"Wet Dream" was described as a "2 and half minute slice of exuberance". Rhian Teasdale explained that the breakup song was written after she kept receiving texts from an ex telling her how he dreamt about her.

It is a punk-leaning song featuring hollered vocals, squally riffs and "tongue-in-cheek" lyrics. Comparing it to the band's debut single "Chaise Longue", Tyler Golsen of Far Out found "Wet Dream" to be "far more melodic and indie rock-based" than its predecessor, and described the lyrical content of the two songs as "bizarre". He noted that "Wet Dream" contains plenty of sexual references, including its title. The lyrics reference the film Buffalo '66 by Vincent Gallo.

== Promotion ==
The band performed the song during their Tiny Desk (Home) Concert, alongside "Chaise Longue", "Too Late Now" and "Oh No". Their performance, released on 1 December 2021, intersperses VHS clips with footage captured on modern cameras, as a nod to their sound which is inspired by the 1970s.

Wet Leg chose to perform "Wet Dream" and "Chaise Longue" when they were the musical guest on The Tonight Show on 9 March 2022. For their second appearance on Later... with Jools Holland, on 16 May 2022, they performed "Wet Dream" and "Ur Mum".

== Music video ==
The music video for "Wet Dream" was directed by Rhian Teasdale. It features Teasdale and Chambers who are about to eat lobster when they realise that they have lobster claws in place of their hands. Its imagery was compared to the work of avant-garde Czech film director Věra Chytilová and Spanish surrealist artist Salvador Dalí.

== Cover version ==
English singer-songwriter Harry Styles promoted the release of his third studio album Harry's House on BBC Radio 1's Live Lounge on 23 May 2022. He played four songs during this set, including a cover of "Wet Dream". This version featured more raw instrumentals than the original, with more aggressive and forward guitars. Wet Leg was later chosen as the opening act for the 2023 European leg of Styles' second concert tour.

== Charts ==
Chart performance for "Wet Dream"
Chart (2022)	Peak position
Japan Hot Overseas (Billboard)	19
UK Singles (Official Charts)	74
UK Independent (Official Charts)	7

== Certifications ==
Certifications for "Wet Dream"
Region	Certification	Certified units/sales
Canada (Music Canada)	Gold	40,000^{‡}
New Zealand (RMNZ)	Gold	15,000^{‡}
United Kingdom (BPI)	Platinum	600,000^{‡}
United States (RIAA)	Gold	500,000^{‡}
^{‡} Sales+streaming figures based on certification alone.
