= Chaise Longue (song) =

Single by Wet Leg

from the album Wet Leg
- Released: 15 June 2021
- Genre: Post-punk revival; garage rock revival
- Length: 3:16
- Label: Domino
- Songwriters: Rhian Teasdale; Hester Chambers; Joshua Mobaraki
- Producer: Jon McMullen

Wet Leg singles chronology
"Chaise Longue" (2021)	"Wet Dream" (2021)

Official video
- "Chaise Longue" on YouTube

"Chaise Longue" is the debut single by English rock duo Wet Leg, released through Domino Recording Company on 15 June 2021 as the lead single from their eponymous debut album (2022). The song went viral in 2021, having had millions of streams and video views, and it won the Grammy for Best Alternative Music Performance at the 65th Annual Grammy Awards.

== Background and composition ==
The song was released on 15 June 2021. "Chaise Longue" has been described as a tongue-in-cheek post-punk song. The track starts with a minimalistic drum beat and bass line, with the vocals sung in a deadpan style and a guitar joining in later in the song. The lyric "Is your muffin buttered?/Would you like us to assign someone to butter your muffin?" is a direct quotation from the 2004 teen comedy Mean Girls.

It was written in 2019 in a single day by vocalist Rhian Teasdale while she was sitting on an actual chaise longue owned by guitarist Hester Chambers's grandfather. A music video, also directed by Teasdale, was released on the same day as the release of the single.

== Track listings ==
Digital download
No.	Title	Length
1.	"Chaise Longue"	3:16

7-inch vinyl
No.	Title	Length
1.	"Chaise Longue"	3:16
2.	"Chaise Longue" (demo)	2:24
Total length:		5:40

== Charts ==
Chart performance for "Chaise Longue"
Chart (2021–2022)	Peak position
UK Singles (Official Charts)	74
UK Indie (Official Charts)	13
US Alternative Airplay (Billboard)	15
US Rock & Alternative Airplay (Billboard)	21

== Certifications ==
Certifications for "Chaise Longue"
Region	Certification	Certified units/sales
New Zealand (RMNZ)	Gold	15,000^{‡}
United Kingdom (BPI)	Gold	400,000^{‡}
^{‡} Sales+streaming figures based on certification alone.

== Release history ==
Release dates and formats for "Chaise Longue"
Region	Date	Format(s)	Label	Ref.
Various	16 June 2021	Digital download; streaming	Domino	
Australia	25 November 2021	7-inch LP	Domino	
