= British Summer Time (concerts) =

Annual music festival in London, England

BST Hyde Park
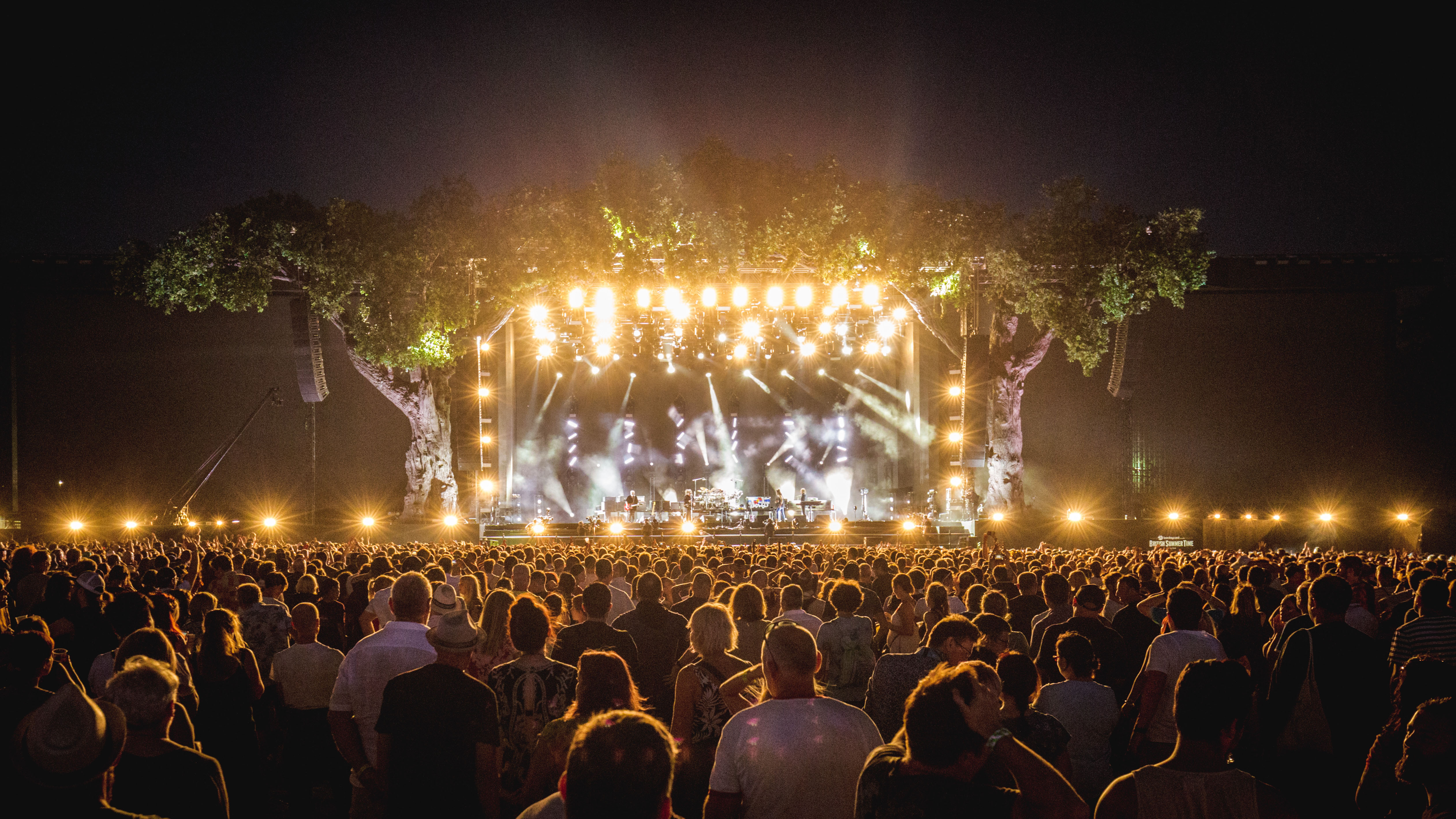
- BST Hyde Park 2018
- Venue: Hyde Park, London
- Attendance: 65,000
- Website: bst-hydepark.com

British Summer Time Hyde Park (BST Hyde Park) is a series of music concerts held once a year in London's Hyde Park. BST Hyde Park lasts for up to three weeks. Since 2013, BST Hyde Park has seen performers such as Arcade Fire, Celine Dion, Bruce Springsteen, The E Street Band, the Rolling Stones, Bon Jovi, Barbra Streisand, Lionel Richie, Kylie Minogue, Black Sabbath, Neil Young, Pearl Jam, Green Day, Tom Petty & the Heartbreakers, Guns N' Roses, The Who, Blur, The Strokes, Robbie Williams, Taylor Swift, P!nk, Adele, Duran Duran, Take That, Billy Joel, Blackpink, Lana Del Rey, Roger Waters, SZA, Stray Kids, Andrea Bocelli, Sabrina Carpenter, Olivia Rodrigo, Zach Bryan, Garth Brooks, Lewis Capaldi, Maroon 5, Mumford & Sons and Pitbull .

== 2026 ==
Line-up
Saturday, 27 June	Sunday, 28 June	Friday, 3 July	Saturday, 4 July	Sunday, 5 July	Friday, 10 July	Saturday, 11 July	Sunday, 12 July
Garth Brooks; Zac Brown Band; Ashley McBryde; Alexandra Kay; The Shires; Jackson Dean; Mae Estes; Crowe Boys; Leah Blevins; Chanel Yates; McGrath	Ateez; Bazzi; Flo; Taemin; Midnight 'Til Morning; ALTÉGO; DearALICE; Tommy Lyon; Raiden; Girl Group; Jazzie Martian	Maroon 5 OneRepublic; Jess Glynne; Ella Eyre; Only the Poets; Bradley Simpson; VOILÀ; Pedro Santos; Dylan Flynn & the Dead Poets; Pat Hamilton; Stefan Mahendra	Mumford & Sons; The War on Drugs; Holly Humberstone; Caamp; Divorce; Cliffords; Stella Lefty; Bec O'Malley; Heidi Curtis; Dermot Henry; Cassandra Coleman	Duran Duran; Scissor Sisters; Nile Rodgers & Chic; Groove Armada; Mel C Sophie Grey; Sistra; Harrison; Wendy Bevan; Sam Scherdel	Pitbull; Kesha; Tinie Tempah; Lil Jon; Los Tucanes de Tijuana; Tia Kofi; Mae Hill; Sanity; DJ Dubl; Euan Lawrence; DJ Jonezy	Lewis Capaldi; Conan Gray; Jacob Alon; The Vaccines; Absolutely; Nieve Ella; Tyler Ballgame; Kerr Mercer; Neckbreakers; Benjamin Steer; Luz; Sebastian Croft; Luke La Volpe	Lewis Capaldi; Conan Gray; Jacob Alon; Alessi Rose; Absolutely; Alexandra Savior; Folk Bitch Trio; Sadie Jean; Ber; Murdo Mitchell; Beattie; Luke Hart; Mark Sharp & the Bicycle Thieves

== 2025 ==
Announced Line-up
Friday 27 June	Saturday 28 June	Sunday 29 June	Friday 4 July	Saturday 5 July	Sunday 6 July	Friday 11 July	Saturday 12 July	Sunday 13 July, cancelled
Olivia Rodrigo; The Last Dinner Party; Girl in Red; Flowerovlove; Between Friends; Katie Gregson-MacLeod; Ruti; Florence Road; Aziya; Déyyess	Zach Bryan; Dermot Kennedy; Mt. Joy; Gabrielle Aplin; Willow Avalon; Ole 60; Noeline Hofmann; Waylon Wyatt; Aaron Rowe; Nadia Kadek	Zach Bryan; Dermot Kennedy; Turnpike Troubadours; Willow Avalon; Ole 60; Noeline Hofmann; Gabriella Rose; Waylon Wyatt; Bo Staloch; Jasper Hodges	Noah Kahan; Gracie Abrams; FINNEAS; Gigi Perez; Paris Paloma; Asha Banks; Hazlett; Jo Hill; Sebastian Schub; Sydney Rose; Kevin Atwater; Lily Fitts; Maya Lane	Sabrina Carpenter; Clairo; Beabadoobee; Amber Mark; Luvcat; Ider; SOFY; DellaXOZ; The Two Lips; Sola	Sabrina Carpenter; Clairo; Olivia Dean; Amber Mark; Chloe Qisha; Ider; Miso Extra; Tanner Adell; DellaXOZ; The Two Lips	Neil Young and the Chrome Hearts; Yusuf / Cat Stevens; Van Morrison; Amble; Alice Merton; Naima Bock; Everyone Says Hi; BLUAI; Sarah Julia; Our Man In The Field; Sam Wilkinson; Holiday Mystics	Stevie Wonder; Ezra Collective; Thee Sacred Souls; Elmiene; Corinne Bailey Rae; Durand Bernarr; Hajaj; Mica Millar; Lulu; Jon Poppii	Jeff Lynne's ELO; The Doobie Brothers; Steve Winwood; Dhani Harrison

Sunday 13 July program was cancelled due to illness affecting Jeff Lynne, leader of headliner ELO.

== 2024 ==
Line-up
Saturday 29 June	Sunday 30 June	Thursday 4 July	Friday 5 July	Saturday 6 July	Sunday 7 July	Friday 12 July	Saturday 13 July	Sunday 14 July
SZA; Sampha; Snoh Aalegra; Elmiene; No Guidnce; Sekou; Hope Tala; Fabiana Palladino; Nia Smith; Jessy Blakemore	Kings of Leon; Paolo Nutini; The Vaccines; Gary Clark Jr. Cannons; Somebody's Child; Red Rum Club; Keo; The Meffs; Daydreamers; Nieve Ella	Morgan Wallen; Riley Green; Ernest; Ella Langley; Alana Springsteen; Alexandra Kay; Zandi Holup; Abbie Mac; The Halfway Kid; Evan Bartels	Andrea Bocelli; Hans Zimmer; Seal; Zucchero Fornaciari; Nadine Sierra; Isabel Leonard; Loren Allred; Andrea Griminelli; Rusanda Panfili; Luca Micheletti; Joaquina; Virginia Bocelli; Mateo Bocelli; Katherine Jenkins; Royal Philharmonic Orchestra; Crouch End Festival Chorus; Myleene Klass	Robbie Williams; Seal; Gaz Coombes; Black Grape; Kate Nash; Soft Play; James Smith; Ellur; Davina Michelle; Ryan Gibb; Ben Kidson	Shania Twain; The Corrs; Anne-Marie; Elle King; Natalie Imbruglia; Cate; Nell Mescal; Dea Matrona; Hannah Grae; Natalie Shay; Germein	Stevie Nicks; Brandi Carlile; Anna Calvi; Paris Paloma; Baby Queen; Nina Nesbitt; Siobhán Winifred; Catty; Talia Rae; Stevie Bill; Nina Versyp	Kylie Minogue; MARINA; Anitta; Ella Henderson; ALTÉGO; Tom Rasmussen; ADMT; Fred Roberts; Blusher; Say Now; Grace Gachot	Stray Kids; Maisie Peters; Alec Benjamin; Nmixx; KIRE; DHRUV; Elijah Woods; Bellah Mae; Tyler Lewis; Ben Ellis; Alienblaze

== 2023 ==
Scheduled line-up
Friday 23 June	Saturday 24 June	Sunday 25 June	Friday 30 June	Saturday 1 July	Sunday 2 July	Thursday 6 July	Friday 7 July	Saturday 8 July	Sunday 9 July
Alfie Boe; Royal Philharmonic Orchestra; Myleene Klass	Pink; Gwen Stefani; Sam Ryder; Sam Tompkins; Gayle; Maddie Zahm; Mae Stephens; Will Linley	Pink; Gwen Stefani; Tinashe; Lyra; Maddie Zahm; Valencia Grace; Nell Mescal; Beren Olivia	Guns N' Roses; The Pretenders; The Darkness; Larkin Poe; Dirty Harry; James and the Cold Gun; The Dust Coda; Grade 2 Bad Nerves; The Foxies	Take That; The Script; Sugababes; Will Young; Aly & AJ; Here at Last; Sonny Tenne; Jazmine Flowers	Blackpink; Sabrina Carpenter; The Rose; Caity Baser; Rebecca Black; Mae Stephens; Peach PRC; Mazie; Annika Bennett; Sarah Crean; Spider	Bruce Springsteen & The E Street Band; The Chicks; Frank Turner; First Time Flyers	Billy Joel; Daryl Hall; Natasha Bedingfield; Bowen*Young; Rumer; Remember Monday; Brad Heidi; Jon Muq; Sophia Alexa; Alyssa Bonagura	Bruce Springsteen & The E Street Band; The Chicks; James Bay	Lana Del Rey; Father John Misty; Gang of Youths; SYML; Riopy; The Last Dinner Party; Tommy Genesis; Holly Macve; Etta Marcus; Kings Elliot; SIIGHTS

== 2022 ==
Scheduled line-up
Friday 24 June	Saturday 25 June	Sunday 26 June	Friday 1 July	Saturday 2 July	Sunday 3 July	Friday 8 July	Saturday 9 July	Sunday 10 July
Elton John Rina Sawayama; Gabriels; Let's Eat Grandma; BERWYN; Thomas Headon; Tom A Smith; Juanita Euka	The Rolling Stones The War on Drugs; Phoebe Bridgers; Vista Kicks; JJ Rosa; Kelly McGrath	Eagles Robert Plant and Alison Krauss; Little Big Town; Cam; Morgan Wade; The Wandering Hearts	Adele Gabrielle; Kacey Musgraves; Mahalia; Self Esteem; Nilüfer Yanya; Tiana Major9; Chrissi; Bonnie Kemplay; Ruti; Tamzene		The Rolling Stones Sam Fender; Courtney Barnett; Christone "Kingfish" Ingram; The Last Dinner Party; The Flints	Pearl Jam Pixies; Cat Power; White Reaper; The Murder Capital; The Glorious Sons; Simon Townshend; La Luz; Sick Joy; October Drift; Fatherson; Life; Dream Nails; Daytime TV	Pearl Jam; Stereophonics; Johnny Marr; Imelda May; Temples; The Last Internationale; La Luz; The Wild Things; JJ Wilde; Tigercub; Whispering Sons; Petrol Girls; James & the Cold Gun; Peaks! Connor Selby	Duran Duran Nile Rodgers & Chic; Aurora; Laura Mvula; Warmduscher; Charlotte Adigéry; Rozzi; Stacey Ryan; Faux Real; Love Sick

== 2020 ==
- Note: Below is the scheduled line-up for the 2020 series; however on 8 April 2020, the entire series was cancelled due to public assembly concerns in regards to the coronavirus pandemic.

Scheduled line-up
Thursday 2 July	Saturday 4 July	Sunday 5 July	Friday 10 July	Saturday 11 July	Sunday 12 July
Post Malone	Little Mix Rita Ora Kesha Zara Larsson	Kendrick Lamar James Blake Brittany Howard	Pearl Jam Pixies White Reaper	Taylor Swift	Duran Duran Gwen Stefani Nile Rodgers CHIC

== 2019 ==
Line-Up
Friday 5 July	Saturday 6 July	Sunday 7 July	Saturday 13 July	Sunday 14 July
Céline Dion Josh Groban Claire Richards Jazz Morley The Adelaides Alice Chater Kerri Watt	Stevie Wonder; Lionel Richie; Lianne La Havas; Corinne Bailey Rae; Norman Jay MBE; The Heavy; Benedict Cork	Barbra Streisand; Bryan Ferry; Kris Kristofferson; Ramin Karmiloo; The Kingdom Choir; Richard Marx; Jamie Lawson; Fauozia; Riva Taylor; Hannah Grace; AJ Brown	Florence + the Machine; The National; Lykke Li; Khruangbin; Nadine Shah; Aldous Harding; Cherry Glazerr; Marlon Williams; Let's Eat Grandma; Self Esteem; Goat Girl; Roses Gabor; Connie Constance; Mathilda Homer; CC Honeymoon	Robbie Williams Black Eyed Peas; Keane; Texas; Feeder; Saint Sister; Acacia and Aaliyah; Callum Beattie; Roe; Raphi

== 2018 ==
Line-Up
Friday 6 July	Saturday 7 July	Sunday 8 July	Friday 13 July	Saturday 14 July	Sunday 15 July
Roger Waters; Richard Ashcroft; Seasick Steve; Squeeze	The Cure; Interpol; Goldfrapp; Editors; Ride; Slowdive; The Twilight Sad Lisa Hannigan	Eric Clapton; Santana; Steve Winwood; Gary Clark Jr; Zucchero Fornaciari	Michael Bublé; Van Morrison; Bananarama; The Feeling; The Shires Catherine McGrath The Adelaides Megan McKenna Rob Green Gypsyfingers The Tailormade	Bruno Mars; Khalid DNCE Charlie Wilson Trombone Shorty Yungen Tom Walker Sofi Tukker Liv Dawson Alex Hepburn DJ Rashida	Paul Simon; James Taylor & His All-Star Band; Bonnie Raitt Johnny Flynn & The Sussex Wit Tom Chaplin Ward Thomas Shawn Colvin Callaghan Night Flight Sarah Darling Jesca Hoop Blueprint Blue

As well as the music artists showed above, the FIFA World Cup semi-final match between England and Croatia was screened. This was the largest London screening of a football match since 1996.

== 2017 ==
Line-Up
Friday 30 June	Saturday 1 July	Sunday 2 July	Thursday 6 July	Saturday 8 July	Sunday 9 July
Phil Collins Blondie; Mike and the Mechanics; KC & The Sunshine Band; Starsailor; The New Power Generation; Chas & Dave; Geyser ft Al Murray; Cats In Space	Green Day Rancid; Gogol Bordello; The Hives; The Damned; Stiff Little Fingers	Justin Bieber Martin Garrix; Tove Lo; Anne-Marie	Kings of Leon Pixies; Nathaniel Rateliff; The Night Sweats	The Killers Elbow; Tears for Fears; White Lies	Tom Petty & The Heartbreakers Stevie Nicks; The Lumineers
Phil Collins Blondie; Mike and the Mechanics; KC & The Sunshine Band; Starsailor; The New Power Generation; Chas & Dave; Geyser ft Al Murray; Cats In Space	The Stranglers; The Living End; Beach Slang; Swmrs; Sunflower Bean; Public Access T.V. TIGRESS	Louis the Child; Jain; Mabel; Nina Nesbitt; Sheppard; Will Heard; James Hersey; Anna of the North; Skinny Living; Dagny Sarah Close; Glowie| Frightened Rabbit; Deaf Havana; Local Natives; Tom Grennan; The Cactus Blossoms; Saint Motel; Benjamin Booker; Billy Raffoul	White Lies Cold War Kids British Sea Power Mew Mystery Jets The Strypes Alex Cameron	Ward Thomas; The Head and the Heart; Tyler Bryant & The Shakedown; The Shelters; Diane Birch; Jordan MacKampa; Juanita Stein; Jade Bird; Catherine Mcgrath	

== 2016 ==
Line-up
Friday 1 July	Saturday 2 July	Sunday 3 July	Friday 8 July	Saturday 9 July	Sunday 10 July
Massive Attack with Young Fathers Patti Smith; TV on the Radio; Warpaint; Ghostpoet	Florence + The Machine Kendrick Lamar; Jamie XX; Cat Power Todd Terje; Blood Orange; Kamasi Washington; Poliça; Georgia; Kelsey Lu; Khruangbin; Gabriel Bruce; Gwilym Gold; Cloves	Carole King Don Henley; Michael Kiwanuka; Louise Goffin; RY X Ward Thomas Billie Marten	Mumford & Sons Alabama Shakes; Wolf Alice; Nick Mulvey; Kurt Vile; Mystery Jets Baaba Maal; The Very Best; Beatenberg; Baio; Mt. Desolation; Matthew & The Atlas; Modern Pleasure; Rukhsana Merrise; The Strumbellas	Take That Olly Murs; Ella Eyre; Jamie Lawson; Nathan Sykes	Stevie Wonder Pharrell Williams; Corinne Bailey Rae; King

== 2015 ==
Line-up
Thursday 18 June	Saturday 20 June	Sunday 21 June	Friday 26 June	Saturday 27 June	Sunday 28 June
Great Oak Stage
The Strokes Beck; Future Islands Fufanu; Gengahr; Hinds; Kieran Leonard; Public Service Broadcasting; Temples; The Wytches; Yak	Blur The Horrors; Metronomy Drenge Broken Hands; Iris Gold; Jupiter Bokondji and Okwess International; Kitty Daisy & Lewis; Metronomy; Roots Manuva; Sugarmen; Teleman	Kylie Minogue Grace Jones; Chic and Nile Rodgers Mylo; Rob da Bank; The Correspondents Bright Light Bright Light; Ekkah; Foxes; Mika; Years and Years	The Who Paul Weller; Kaiser Chiefs; Johnny Marr; Gaz Coombes The Rifles; Vintage Trouble; St Paul and The Broken Bones; Sugarmen Sleaford Mods; SlyDigs; Standard Lamps; Rival State	Taylor Swift Ellie Goulding; John Newman; Vance Joy; Rae Morris Iris Gold; Jamie Lawson; JP Cooper; Laura Doggett; Lauren Aquilina; Sheppard	Union J Mr Tumble; Collabro; Dick & Dom; Sam & Mark; The Cuban Brothers; The Vegetable Orchestra; Bethan Leadley

== 2014 ==
Line-up
Thursday 3 July	Friday 4 July	Saturday 5 July	Sunday 6 July	Tuesday 8 July	Thursday 10 July	Saturday 12 July	Sunday 13 July
Arcade Fire Jake Bugg; Wild Beasts; Future Islands Public Service Broadcasting; The Hearts; Wakey!Wakey!	Black Sabbath Soundgarden; Faith No More; Motörhead; Soulfly Wolfmother; Hell; Kobra And The Lotus; Ume; Broken Hands; The Bots Gallows; Bo Ningen; The Graveltones; Hang the Bastard; A Plastic Rose Rise To Remain; Blitz Kids (band); The Struts; The First Wolfmother; Gallows; Vukovi	The Libertines Lucie Barat; The View; Deadcuts; Lipstick Melodies Brown Bear; Cuckoo Lander; Darlia; Graham Coxon; I Am Kloot; Maxïmo Park; Raglans; Reverend And The Makers; Spiritualized; Swim Deep; The Enemy; The Rifles; The Twang; The View; Wolf Alice	McBusted Backstreet Boys; The Vamps; Scouting For Girls; Diversity Wheatus Lawson; Five Neon Jungle Elyar Fox Ollie Marland George Barnett; Joel Baker; Mike Dignam	Rixton Young Kato; Jacob & Goliath	Tim Minchin Milton Jones; Nina Conti; Alan Davies; Gina Yashere; Jasper Carrot	Neil Young & Crazy Horse The National; Tom Odell; Half Moon Run; Lucy Rose Caitlin Rose; Phosphorescent; Flyte Ethan Johns; The Webb Sisters Jack Savoretti; To Kill A King; Hero Fisher Grant Nicholas; Meadowlark; To Kill A King; Battles of Winter	Tom Jones Boyzone; Little Mix; 10cc Bootleg Beatles Amelia Lily; DJ Harvey

== 2013 ==
Line-up
Friday 5 July	Saturday 6 July	Sunday 7 July	Friday 12 July	Saturday 13 July	Sunday 14 July
Great Oak Stage
Bon Jovi Kaiser Chiefs; Bush	The Rolling Stones The Vaccines; The Temper Trap; Gary Clark Jr. King Charles	JLS; The Beach Boys The Saturdays; Paul Young; Soul Rebels; The Cuban Brothers; The Overtones; Kimberly Wyatt; Lukas McFarlane; Ruff Diamond	Ray Davies Elvis Costello; Gabrielle Aplin; Nick Lowe	The Rolling Stones Jake Bugg; Tom Odell; The 1975; Vintage Trouble	Lionel Richie; Jennifer Lopez Chic featuring Nile Rodgers; Eliza Doolittle; Stooshe
The Theatre
The Futureheads; Charlie Simpson; The Coronas; Bernhoft	Palma Violets; The Boxer Rebellion; Temples; Story Books	The Gruffalo	Lucy Rose; Justin Currie	The Horrors; Public Service Broadcasting; The Family Rain; Valerie June	Al Jarreau; Beverley Knight; Delilah; Angel
Village Hall
Rival Sons; Little Barrie; Funeral Suits; Leo Gun	Tribes; Broken Hands; Drenge; Gabriel Bruce; Will Heard	Dionne Bromfield; Loveable Rogues; Tich	Tift Merritt; To Kill a King	Adam Cohen; Fink; Hudson Taylor; Luke Sital-Singh; James Bay	Charlie Brown; Vince Kidd; Smiler; Amplify Dot
Bandstand
All the Young; Josh Flowers; The Virginmarys	Triggerfinger; Kimberly Anne; Splashh; Loom; Will Joseph Clark; Whinnie Williams	Avalon Comedy Stage	Thea Gilmore; Scott McFarnon; Olivia Sebastianelli	Keziah Jones; Hero Fisher; Propellers; The Riptide Movement; Wild Smiles	Incognito; Little of the World; Pigbag

Elton John had been scheduled to perform on Friday 12 July, but he had to cancel due to illness. All tickets were refunded and the event was made free as a one-off.
