= Midnight Kiss (EP) =

EP by Propellers
- Released: 28 January 2013
- Genre: Indie rock, indie pop, synthpop
- Label: Propellers Music

Propellers chronology
Midnight Kiss (2013)	Black Mascara Eyes (2013)

Singles from Midnight Kiss
- 1. "Midnight Kiss" Released: 28 January 2013; 2. "Landslide" Released: 24 March 2013

Midnight Kiss is the title of debut EP by English indie rock/synthpop band Propellers. It was released on 28 January 2013.

== Promotion ==
The first single from the EP was the title track "Midnight Kiss". The song was first played by Jacob Rickard on BBC Introducing in Kent at the beginning of January 2013. The band were chosen for daytime plays on BBC Radio 1 shows, including Sara Cox and Scott Mills. A music video for "Midnight Kiss" was released on 28 January 2013 onto YouTube.

In March 2013, Propellers released the second single from the EP, titled "Landslide". A music video for the track was released onto YouTube on 24 March.

== Track listing ==
No.	Title	Length
1.	"Midnight Kiss"	3:32
2.	"Landslide"	3:21
3.	"Rattlesnakes"	3:00
4.	"Untouchable"	3:46

== Personnel ==
Propellers

- Max Davenport – lead vocals
- Archie Davenport – guitar
- Charlie Simpson – bass guitar
- Jimmy Goodwin – keyboards
- Will Wilkinson – drums
