= T in the Park 2013 =

Music festival in Scotland

T in the Park
- Dates: 11–14 July 2013
- Locations: Balado, Scotland, UK
- Years active: 1994–present
- Website: http://tinthepark.com/

T in the Park 2013 was a three-day music festival which took place between 11 and 14 July 2013 in Balado, Kinross. It was the 20th Anniversary #T20 of the Scottish music festival Rihanna and Mumford and Sons were announced as the first and second headliner acts on 4 December 2012. Others acts confirmed on the same day were Jake Bugg, Alt-J, Of Monsters and Men, The Script, Paloma Faith. On 5 December 2012, The Killers were announced as third headliner act and other acts confirmed were Two Door Cinema Club and Azealia Banks. On 13 December 2012, it was announced that Emeli Sandé would return to the music festival for its 20th anniversary. On 13 February 2013, Germany Electronic band Kraftwerk were added to the line-up.

== Tickets ==
Similar to previous years, early-bird tickets were released within days of the conclusion of the 2012 event, on 13 July 2012. Tickets remained on sale until the following Sunday. The second release of tickets went on sale at 9 am on 7 December 2012. The third and final batch went on sale in February, 2013 along with the release of the Line-up.

== Line-up ==
The Killers, Rihanna and Mumford and Sons were announced as headliner acts for 2013 festival. Other acts announced were: Emeli Sandé, Jake Bugg, Alt-J, Of Monsters and Men, The Script, Paloma Faith, Two Door Cinema Club and Azealia Banks. On 13 February 2013, Germany Electronic band Kraftwerk were added to the line-up. On 22 April 2013, Ke$ha, Little Mix, Lawson, James Arthur, Lucy Spraggan, Bo Bruce and Diana Vickers were added to the line-up.

Scottish Sun Signing Tent

Scottish Sun Signing Tent
Friday 12 July	Saturday 13 July	Sunday 14 July
Rudimental; Jake Bugg	The View; Frightened Rabbit; The Strypes; Nina Nesbitt	Little Mix; Bastille; Brooke Candy

Main Stage
Friday 12 July	Saturday 13 July	Sunday 14 July
Mumford & Sons; 22:20-23:50; Chase and Status; 20:35-21:50; Emeli Sandé; 19:05-20:05; Kendrick Lamar; 17:45-18:35; The Proclaimers; 16:30-17:15	Rihanna; 22:20-23:50; The Script; 20:50-21:50; Snoop Dogg; 19:20-20:20; Paloma Faith; 18:00-18:50; The Lumineers; 16:45-17:30; The View; 15:40-16:25; Deacon Blue; 14:30-15:10; The Fratellis; 13:30-14:15; James Arthur; 12:30-13:05	The Killers; 21:05-22:50; Stereophonics; 19:10-20:35; Frank Ocean; 17:40-18:40; Two Door Cinema Club; 16:20-17:10; Rita Ora; 15:05-15:50; Ocean Colour Scene; 13:45-14:35; Earth, Wind & Fire; 12:30-13:15

Radio 1 Stage
Friday	Saturday	Sunday
Calvin Harris; 22:35-23:50; The Courteeners; 21:15-22:05; Jake Bugg; 20:00-20:45; Texas; 18:30-19:30; Haim; 17:30-18:15; Milo Greene; 16:30-17:10	Beady Eye; 22:15-23:50; Dizzee Rascal; 20:45-21:45; Frightened Rabbit; 19:25-20:15; Noah and the Whale; 18:05-18:55; Kesha; 16:50-17:35; Villagers; 15:40-16:20; Lawson; 14:30-15:10; Gabrielle Aplin; 13:30-14:10; The Original Rudeboys; 12:30-13:10	David Guetta; 21:20-22:50; Foals; 19:50-20:50; Editors; 18:35-19:20; Azealia Banks; 17:20-18:05; Frank Turner; 16:25-17:05; Bastille; 15:20-16:05; Little Mix; 14:25-15:00; The Heavy; 13:20-14:05; Mallory Knox; 12:20-13:00

King Tut's Wah Wah Tent
Friday	Saturday	Sunday
Kraftwerk; 22:20-23:50; Phoenix; 21:00-21:50; Of Monsters and Men; 19:40-20:30; Rudimental; 18:25-19:10; Everything Everything; 17:25-18:05; Imagine Dragons; 16:30-17:10	Alt-J; 22:20-23:50; Twin Atlantic; 20:50-21:50; Travis; 19:20-20:20; Miles Kane; 18:00-18:50; Palma Violets; 16:45-17:30; Mark Owen; 15:35-16:15; Nina Nesbitt; 14:40-15:25; Foy Vance; 13:45-13:25; Jack Savoretti; 12:50-13:30; Swim Deep; 12:00-12:35	Yeah Yeah Yeahs; 21:25-22:50; Labrinth; 19:40-20:55; Hurts; 18:15-19:10; Disclosure; 17:00-17:45; Johnny Marr; 15:50-16:30; The 1975; 14:45-15:25; Tom Odell; 13:45-14:25; Deap Vally; 12:50-13:25; Lewis Watson; 12:00-12:35

Slam Tent
Friday	Saturday	Sunday
Green Velvet; 22:30-00:00; Jackmaster & Joy Orbison; 21:00-22:30; Maceo Plex; 19:30-21:00; Eats Everything; 18:00-19:30; Silicone Soul; 16:30-18:00	Richie Hawtin; 22:30-00:00; Slam; 21:05-22:30; Laurent Garnier; 19:45-21:05; Claude VonStroke; 18:35-19:45; Maya Jane Coles; 17:35-18:35; Derrick Carter x Mark Farina x DJ Sneak (b2b); 13:35-17:35; H-Foundation; 12:30-13:35	Ben Klock & Marcel Dettmann (b2b); 20:30-23:00; Adam Beyer; 19:15-20:30; Seth Troxler; 18:00-19:15; Tyler, The Creator; 17:10-18:00; Earl Sweatshirt; 16:00-16:40; Nina Kraviz; 14:30-15:30; Jamie Jones; 13:30-14:30; Lee Foss; 12:45-13:30; Anja Schneider; 12:00-12:45

Transmission Stage
Friday	Saturday	Sunday
Friday I'm In Love Steve Mason James Skelly & The Intenders Tribes FIDLAR Vigo Thieves	My Bloody Valentine British Sea Power Lower Than Atlantis Willy Mason Daughter Kodaline Peace The Strypes Theme Park MS MR	Hot Natured Local Natives Chvrches Jagwar Ma Modestep AlunaGeorge Laura Mvula Ruen Brothers Brooke Candy Anderson McGinty Webster Ward & Fisher

T-Break Stage
Friday	Saturday	Sunday
The Merrylees Darc Hacktivist Bo Bruce Sons & Lovers Hector Bizerk Honeyblood Deer Lake	The Velveteen Saints Sunshine Social Waiting For Go The Virgin Marys Red Sky July Diana Vickers Dolomite Minor Lucy Spraggan Sienna MMX Michael Cassidy Fake Major Seams	Machines In Heaven Blindfolds Vasa PRIDES Lucy Rose DIIV Josh Record Trash Talk Moya Joesphine Pronto Mama Arches Poor Things

BBC Introducing Stage
Friday	Saturday	Sunday
	Discopolis The Recovery! Saint Maxx and The Fanatics Big Beat Bronson The Adelines Animal Noise Roman Noise Emily Burns Baby Strange Fake Major Paws	The LaFontaines Jim Lockey & The Solemn Sun Propellers Astroid Boys The Lake Poets Fat Goth Steel Trees Story Books Departures Model Aeroplanes

== Incidents ==
The number of arrests rose to 91, which was a sharp increase from 2012 where only 30 were made, with the most serious offence being five people arrested and charged with using pyrotechnic flares.

Advance warning was given to all festival-goers about a deadly batch of fake ecstasy pills which were linked to the death of 17 people between April and July 2013.

Police Supt Rick Dunkerley, said: "While arrests are up on last year, this is due to the proactive efforts of our police officers who worked closely with stewards to ensure it was a safe and enjoyable event for the audience. The fact that there were no signs of the fake ecstasy tablets at the event is in part testament to the extensive pre-event messaging and work carried out in collaboration with the festival organisers".

== See also ==
- T in the Park 2014
- T in the Park 2012
- T in the Park 2011
- T in the Park 2010
- List of music festivals in the United Kingdom
