= The Dust Coda =

British hard rock band

The Dust Coda are a four-piece British rock band residing in London, England. The band are signed to Earache Records and were founded in 2013 by Australian-born vocalist John Drake and guitarist Adam Mackie. The rhythm section consists of drummer Scott Miller and bassist Tony Ho (who succeeded Ollie Keeler in 2016).

The Dust Coda's track "Rock n Roll" was part of the 2020 Earache Records compilation Earache Presents: The New Wave of Rock n Roll, prior to their signing with the record label later that year. Their album Mojo Skyline, the first released on Earache Records, reached No. 27 on the UK Albums Chart in 2021. In 2023, their album Loco Paradise became their second UK Top 40 album and achieved a #1 spot in the UK Rock & Metal Chart.

== History ==
Mackie was influenced by artists including OMD, Tears for Fears, the Stranglers, U2, Simply Red and Eric Clapton. The Dust Coda's first release was their The More It Fades EP, which came out in 2016 and features the single "The More It Fades", an acoustic version of "The More It Fades" and a live version of "Sweet Love Is Gone" recorded at Astral Studios. The band's debut studio album, The Dust Coda, was self-released in November 2017.

The Dust Coda saw Planet Rock radio airplay of their singles "Breakdown" and "Weakness", on both the A-list in 2021 and the B-list in 2017, and Wyatt Wendels' New Rock Show, respectively, and a video premiere of their single "Let Me Go" via Planet Rock's webpage. They were nominated for Best British Album (Mojo Skyline) and Best British Single ("Limbo Man") for Planet Rock's The Rocks 2021 Awards (having previously been nominated for Best New Band as part of Planet Rock Radio's The Rocks awards in 2017 and named as one of Planet Rock's 'Ones To Watch'). The first single from their album Mojo Skyline, "Limbo Man", was added to the B-list on Planet Rock Radio in November 2020, and the "Limbo Man" music video was also premiered via Planet Rock's webpage. "Limbo Man" was also featured in Classic Rock Magazine's 'Tracks Of The Week'. Their single "Weakness" appeared in Classic Rock Magazine's online poll for Greatest Rock Song of the 21st Century. Their song "Demon" was recently selected to be played on Sir Elton John's Apple Music Beats 1 show Rocket Hour, and the song was added to his 'Elton John: Loves' Spotify playlist, which highlights new music. On 12 December, their new single "Limbo Man" received airplay on BBC Radio 2 via The Rock Show with Johnnie Walker.

The Dust Coda have performed across various British rock festivals, including Planet Rockstock, Winter's End, Ramblin' Man Fair, Steelhouse Festival and Hard Rock Hell.

They have supported bands such as Black Stone Cherry, British Lion (formed by Iron Maiden's Steve Harris) and the Dead Daisies.

The Dust Coda are considered a part of the 'New Wave of Classic Rock'. Their track "Rock N Roll" appeared on rock and metal label Earache Records' compilation Earache Presents: The New Wave Of Rock N Roll, which charted at #10 in the UK Official Vinyl Albums Chart.

In 2020, following the release of this compilation, the Dust Coda signed to Earache Records. Their sophomore album Mojo Skyline is due to be released by Earache Records in 2021. The album artwork was designed by Nick Dwyer, artist and creative director at Beavertown Brewery, using the same artistic style as Beavertown's beer designs.

Mojo Skyline features performances from Tom Pinder (trombone), Gavin Fitzjohn (trumpet/tenor saxophone/baritone saxophone) and Nick Nasmyth (piano/organ), who have played for the likes of Manic Street Preachers, Paolo Nutini and Kylie Minogue.

On 8 January 2021, The Dust Coda re-released their single 'Breakdown' under Earache Records. It featured in Classic Rock Magazine's 'Tracks Of The Week'.

On 3 February 2021, The Dust Coda entered into an official brand partnership with Four Roses Bourbon, a brand which would go on to feature in their music video "Jimmy 2 Times". On 25 February 2021, The Dust Coda released their new single and music video "Jimmy 2 Times", a song based on the Goodfellas character of the same name, which premiered via Ramblin' Man Fair in conjunction with an announcement that The Dust Coda would be playing the main stage at the festival on 17 July 2021. 'Jimmy 2 Times' featured in Classic Rock Magazine's 'Tracks Of The Week'.

On 26 March 2021, Mojo Skyline was released. It reached No. 27 on the UK Albums Chart and No. 3 in the UK Rock & Metal Albums Chart.

On 5 October 2021, The Dust Coda played WDR Fernsehen's Rockpalast Crossroads Festival amidst their first European tour.

In April 2023, the band announced their third album Loco Paradise and their Loco Paradise UK headline tour for October 2023. Following a performance in support of Guns N' Roses at BST Hyde Park and a UK in-store tour, Loco Paradise was released on 7 July 2023 and achieved No. 36 in the UK Albums Chart and No. 1 in the UK Rock & Metal Albums Chart. The album was met with critical acclaim.

== Band members ==
=== Current members ===
- Andrew Knightley – vocals, rhythm guitar (2024–present)
- Adam Mackie – lead guitar (2013–present)
- Scott Miller – drums (2013–present)
- Tony Ho – bass guitar (2016–present)

=== Past members ===
- Ollie Keeler – bass guitar (2013–2016)
- John Drake – vocals, rhythm guitar (2013–2024)

== Discography ==
=== Studio albums ===
- The Dust Coda (2017)
- Mojo Skyline (2021)
- Loco Paradise (2023)

=== EPs ===
- The More It Fades
