= Fake Major =

Scottish musical duo

- Origin: Glasgow, Scotland
- Genres: Pop
- Labels: Comets and Cartwheels
- Members: David McGinty; Richard Ferguson
- Website: www.fakemajor.com

Fake Major is a Scottish pop music duo based in Glasgow consisting of the musicians Richard Ferguson and David McGinty, who featured as a back-up vocalist on Snow Patrol's 2006 album "Eyes Open". David McGinty and Richard Ferguson were originally part of the four-piece indie rock band Endor. Fake Major released their debut EP "Have Plenty of Fun" on 1 March 2013 and have played at several mainstream events and festivals such as T in the Park and the Tartan Heart Festival as well as many popular music venues over Scotland.

== Formation ==
Fake Major was formed by David McGinty and Richard Ferguson in 2013. They were former members of the band Endor (2001–2012), which split up after 10 years. Endor consisted of four members, David McGinty (Vocals/Guitar), Richard Ferguson (Drums/Vocals), Calum Johnston (Bass) and Mark Church (Guitar/Vocals). Endor released an EP "Without the Help of Sparks" and a self-titled album which featured music played with drums, guitars, glockenspiel, harmonica, melodica, organ and rhodes. A second Endor record was considered but Richard Ferguson and David McGinty, being the main songwriters of Endor, decided to start their own project as a duo. McGinty and Ferguson prepared their Fake Major EP before officially announcing the disbandment of Endor.

=== Endor ===
The original group, Endor, was named after the second moon of Endor from Star Wars. The band formed in 2001 and lasted 10 years. David McGinty and Richard Ferguson were the two main songwriters for Endor and began writing songs for Fake Major before Endor had officially split.

Endor released their debut album on 5 July 2010. In an interview at the time, David McGinty, now a member of Fake Major claimed that

Having the CDs in our hands feels really strange. All the work you put in is suddenly just a massive box sitting on the doorstep, with a delivery man asking you to sign for it and you definitely can't then say "No, I’m not signing for these, I want to record an alternative guitar part". But the physical copies look great.

The album was recorded in The Diving Bell Lounge in Glasgow, with Marcus Mackay. The band released the album themselves.

One of Endor's biggest appearances was on the T-Break stage at T in the Park, 2006, a stage in which Fake Major would become familiar with again in 2013.

The band were well known for having sung in a choir for the recording of Snow Patrol's album Eye's Open.

== Music ==
Fake Major's music features heavy harmonies, dual vocals and guitars. Their EP songs have several other instruments but when played live, friends from other bands play these instruments as an expanded quintet which was featured at T in the Park 2013 and King Tut's Wah Wah Hut. The songs are written so they can be played as a duo with synchronized vocals and guitars but can have more instruments brought in for recording, all while being able to play live as a duo just as effectively while providing a new experience for fans instead of replicating their EP.

The whole point of Fake Major is that the songs would be good enough to just be played by the two of us and a guitar, and that would be as good as coming to see it as a full live band. We'll probably still do gigs with friends playing drums, guitar and bass. And we'll play gigs with just the two of us and one guitar, but it'll be a different experience for each.

The group is currently working on a second EP and playing gigs as both a duo and as an expanded quintet.

Fake Major are represented by the Glasgow-based record label Comets & Cartwheels, founded by music promoter Paul Downie. They also represent acts such as Blood Relatives and There Will Be Fireworks. Comets & Cartwheels focus mainly on indie and folk music.

=== Have Plenty of Fun ===
Have Plenty of Fun is Fake Majors' first EP, released on 1 March 2013. It featured the four tracks "Little Researcher", "Fiction", "Cotton and Ink" and "Love in Mundane". "Little Researcher" was released as a single.

== Live performances ==
=== T in the Park 2013 ===
Fake Major appeared at T in the Park 2013, the biggest musical festival in Scotland, on the T break stage on Saturday 13 July 2013. When selected to play at the festival Richard Ferguson claimed “We’ve been lucky enough to see some of our favourite bands at T in the Park in the past and know how strong the line-up is each year. Playing the T Break Stage will be a great honour for us both.” Fake Major, along with hundreds of unsigned acts submitted their demos to be considered by T in the Park bosses, there were only 16 places available for unsigned artists to perform at the festival, one of which went to Fake Major. Richard Ferguson said that "Playing the T Break Stage will be a great honour for us both."

=== The Wickerman Festival ===
Fake Major appeared at The Wickerman Festival on 26 and 27 July 2013. A festival which they also played as Endor. Tenement TV released backstage sessions of Fake Major, where the duo played two of their songs "Seventeen" and "Fiction" which featured their dual vocals and guitars.

=== Tartan Heart Festival ===
Fake Major played at the Tartan Heart Festival, founded in 2004, which is held on the Belladrum Estate near Inverness on 2–3 August 2013. They played a selection of songs from their EP "Have Plenty of Fun" and were interviewed by netsounds unsigned on Episode 14, Season 6 of their podcast which featured Fatherson, PAWS, The LaFontaines, Brown Bear & The Bandits and Meursault.

=== Loopallu ===
Fake Major played at the Loopallu festival on 21 September 2013. Loopalu is a festival which is hosted in Ullapool (hense the name of the festival is simply Ullapool backward), Scotland, which in 2013 was in its 7th year of running. The festival takes place in September and has seen the likes of Mumford & Sons and Scouting for Girls perform.

=== Other performances ===
Fake Major have also performed in smaller venues such as the 02 abc on Sauchiehall Street in Glasgow. This is one of Glasgow's best known music venues and attracts acts such as Newton Faulkner. Another Scottish venue which they are familiar with is King Tut's Wah Wah Hut. King Tut's is known widely on the Scottish live music front and is one of the most desired venues by artists. Acts such as The Killers have performed in King Tut's.
