= Exmouth =

Seaside resort town in Devon, England

Coordinates: 50.620°N 3.413°W

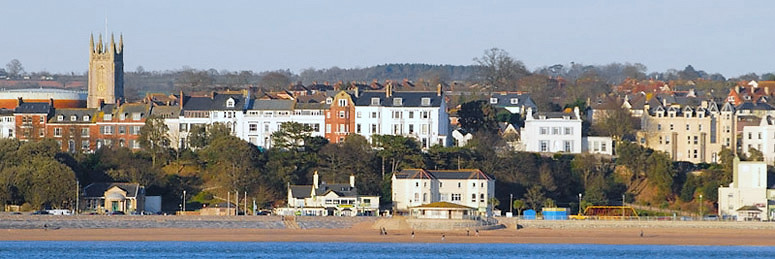
- Exmouth seafront (June 2007)

- Coat of arms of Exmouth Town Council

- Location within Devon
- Population: 35,488 (2021 Census)
- OS grid reference: SY004809
- Civil parish: Exmouth
- District: East Devon
- Shire county: Devon
- Region: South West
- Country: England
- Sovereign state: United Kingdom
- Post town: EXMOUTH
- Postcode district: EX8
- Dialling code: 01395
- Police: Devon and Cornwall
- Fire: Devon and Somerset
- Ambulance: South Western
- UK Parliament: Exmouth and Exeter East
- Website: www.visitexmouth.co.uk

Exmouth /ˈɛksməθ/ is a port town, civil parish, and seaside resort located on the east bank at the mouth of the River Exe, approximately 11 miles (18 km) southeast of Exeter, in the East Devon district, in the county of Devon, England.

According to the 2021 Census, Exmouth has a population of 35,488, making it the fifth largest settlement in Devon by population.

Historically known as a popular seaside resort, Exmouth is noted for its long sandy beaches, marina, and watersports opportunities, attracting visitors when the weather's nice. It also serves as a commuter town for nearby Exeter.

== History ==
Byzantine coins bearing the mark of Anastasius I, dating from around 498–518, were found on the beach in 1970. Evidence of people living at Exmouth Point goes back to the 11th century, when it was called Lydwicnaesse, meaning "the point of the Bretons".

The two ecclesiastical parishes that now make up Exmouth – Littleham and Withycombe Raleigh – can be traced back to before Saxon times. The name "Exmouth" comes from its position at the mouth of the River Exe estuary. The word "Exe" itself comes from an old Celtic word meaning "fish". For many centuries, the parishes were part of the East Budleigh Hundred.

In 1240, an area known as Pratteshuthe (meaning Pratt’s landing place) was sold to the mayor and citizens of Exeter. This spot was where the estuary’s ferry dock was located. Over time, the name changed to Pratteshide, and later became known as Mona Island. Today, the site is marked by a seating area outside the Glenorchy United Reformed Church, near the Magnolia Shopping Centre.

For many years, trade through the port was limited—partly because of shallow waters near the quay, but mostly because the city of Exeter owned the dock and controlled all traffic on the estuary. The roads in and out of the area were in poor condition and only occasionally repaired by the parishes they passed through. A more permanent dock was built in 1825, replacing a series of earlier, likely seasonal, docks first seen on maps from 1576 marked as "The Docke". New docks, designed by Eugenius Birch, opened in 1868, and a short railway line connected them to the goods yard. A lively community of around 125 chalets once stood near the docks along the shoreline, but these were later replaced by the Exmouth Quay residential marina.

In earlier times, people found it difficult to settle in the estuary area because of the harsh, exposed conditions. Instead, settlements were more permanent in the more sheltered rural areas nearby. Exmouth started to grow in the 13th century. The land was owned by Morin Uppehille, who gave part of it to a man called John the Miller. John built a windmill on the exposed headland, where he made a living helped by the strong south-west winds. A small cluster of farms, the ferry dock, and the windmill eventually developed into what we now know as Exmouth.

Sir Walter Raleigh (born 1544) began several of his sea voyages from Exmouth Harbour.

In the mid-17th century, the area was attacked by so-called "Turkish pirates" (actually Algerian corsairs), who raided the coasts of Devon and Cornwall. They targeted ships and tried to capture sailors and villagers to sell as slaves in North Africa.

The town became more established in the 18th century and is considered the oldest seaside resort in Devon. With travel to mainland Europe disrupted by the troubles in France, visitors came for the sea views and the popular salt waters, believed to have healing properties. Exmouth gained a reputation as a place where wealthy people went to improve their health. Notable visitors included Lady Byron and her daughter Ada Lovelace. Lady Nelson, the estranged wife of Lord Nelson, also lived in Exmouth and is buried in Littleham Churchyard.

For many years, Exmouth attracted high-class tourists. This changed in 1861 when the railway reached the town, making it accessible to many more people and starting a boom in mass tourism. Much of the town’s current layout dates from this "golden age".

== Architecture ==
Exmouth has a wide range of architecture, ranging from small cob cottages in parts of the town that were once villages and are now incorporated into it, such as Withycombe, to the Georgian, Victorian and Edwardian town houses. The seafront has a traditional promenade. High above the promenade is the Beacon terrace, which first became fashionable in Georgian times.

The majority of buildings in Exmouth were constructed during the Victorian era with the arrival of the railway. The area to the west of Exeter Road is land that was reclaimed by the railway, Exeter Road originally being part of the seafront. Some houses near to the station in Littleham were constructed for the workers on the railway.

== Demography and economy ==
In addition to its substantial summer tourist trade, Exmouth serves as a regional centre for leisure industries, particularly water sports such as sailing, kite sailing, paddleboarding, jet-skiing, and wind-surfing, and outdoor activities such as bird-watching, cycling and walking. The Exe Estuary is a Site of Special Scientific Interest and is noted in particular for its wading and migrating birds. A large part of the estuary lies within a nature reserve. Exmouth marks the western end of the Jurassic Coast World Heritage Site, which stretches eastwards along the coast to Poole, in Dorset; the South West Coast Path allows for walking along this coast. The town is also at the western end of the East Devon Way path that leads to Lyme Regis.

== Education ==
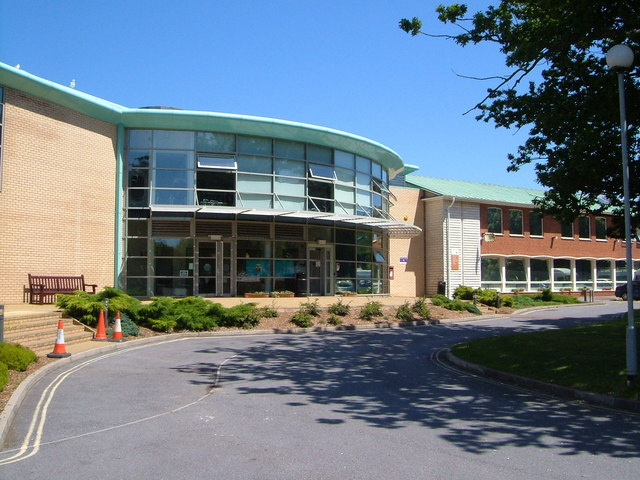
Exmouth Campus, University of Plymouth

The town has eight primary schools, one secondary school, and a school for the deaf.

Primary schools:

- Bassett's Farm Primary School
- Brixington Primary School
- Exeter Road Community Primary School
- Littleham Church of England Primary School
- Marpool Primary School
- St Joseph's Catholic Primary School
- The Beacon Church of England (VA) Primary School
- Withycombe Raleigh Church of England Primary School

Secondary school:

- Exmouth Community College

The Deaf Academy is an independent special school run by Exeter Royal Academy for Deaf Education, a registered charity. It provides education for deaf pupils aged 5 to 16 years with further education post-16 and has residential places. Exeter Royal Academy for Deaf Education bought the site in 2016 and began developing it into a state-of-the-art deaf education centre. In 2020, newly rebranded as The Deaf Academy, the school completed the move from Exeter to Exmouth.

The site had earlier been Rolle College, opened in 1946, and later became the Exmouth campus of the University of Plymouth. In 2008, the University decided to close the college. East Devon MP Hugo Swire discussed the college's closure in Parliament.

== Geography ==
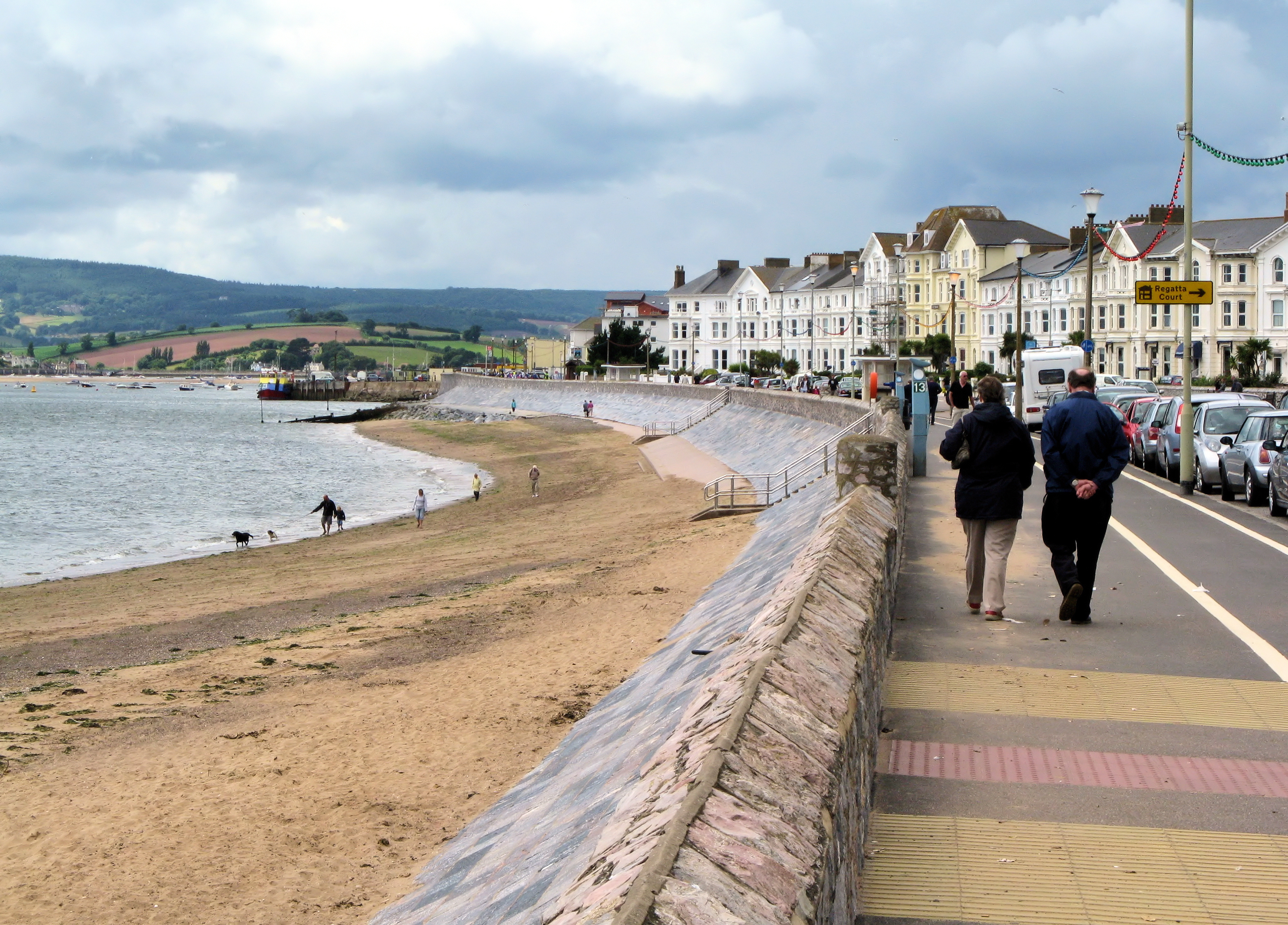
The seafront, looking west towards Dawlish Warren

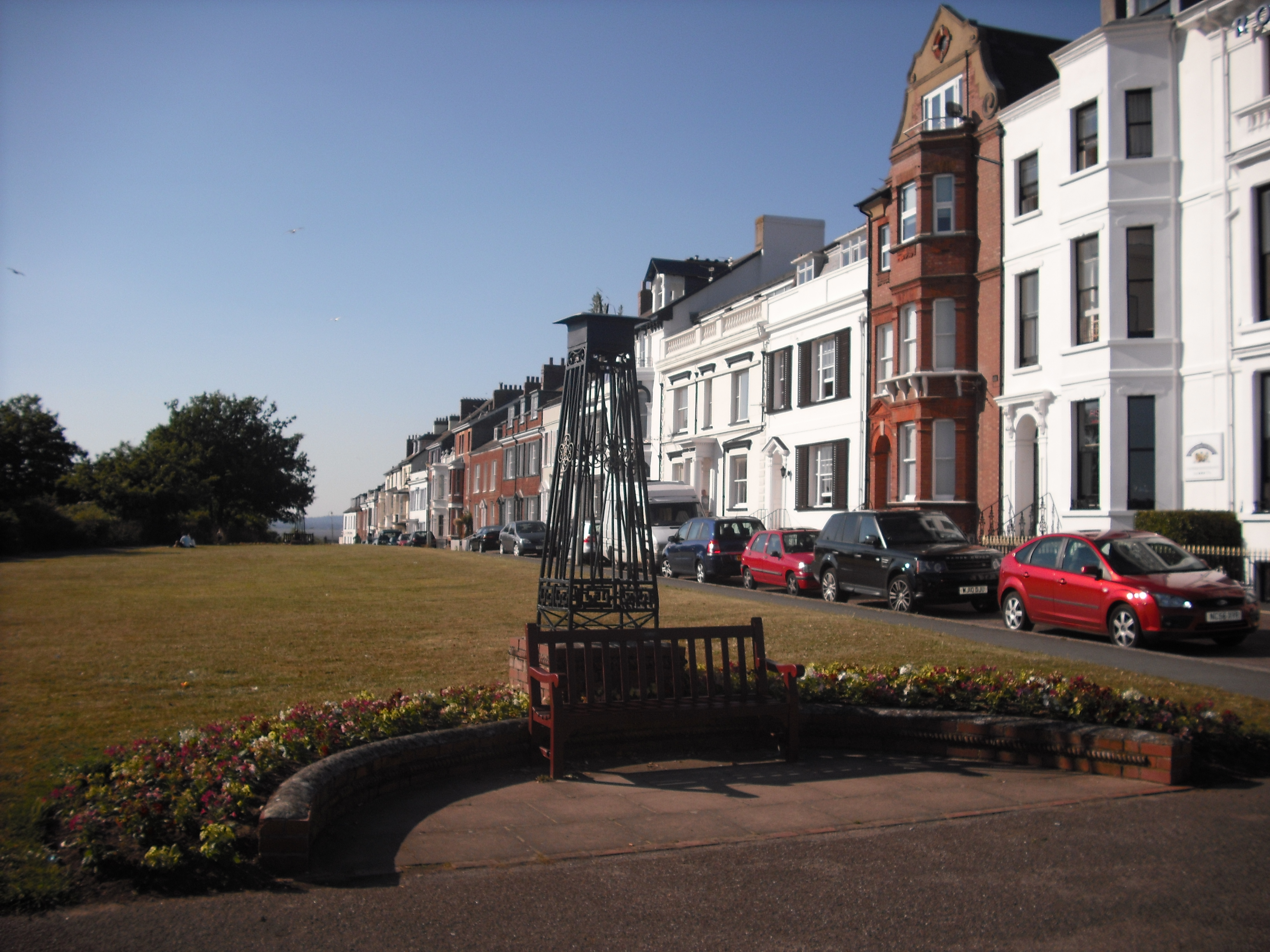
The Beacon at Exmouth

The town is defined by the sea and river frontages (each about a mile long), and stretches around 2.5 miles (4 km) inland, along a north-easterly axis. The docks lie at the western corner of this rectangle, where the river passes through a narrow passage into the sea, the mouth of the estuary being nearly closed by Dawlish Warren on the opposite shore of the river. Dawlish Warren is a natural sand spit and is home to rare wildlife and plants, part of which is a nature reserve and restricted access. The sea frontage forms a sandy two mile long beach; at its eastern end, the town is limited by the cliffs of the High Land of Orcombe, a National Trust-owned open space which rises to a peak at Orcombe Point.

Geologically, the low hill known as "The Beacon", in the centre of the present town, is formed of breccias that are an outcrop of a similar formation on the west side of the Exe estuary. The rising land on which the town has grown is formed of New Red Sandstone. This solid land is surrounded by mudflats and sandspits, some of which have been stabilised and now form part of the land on which the town is built, and some of which remain as tidal features in the estuary and off the coast. The outflow from the river flows eastwards, parallel to the beach for some distance, limited by sandbanks that are exposed at low tide. Many of the buildings on the reclaimed land are fitted with pumps to extract water from their basements during high tide.

== Government ==
Exmouth Town Council

Type
- Type: Civil parish

Leadership
- Mayor: Joe Whibley, Independent

Structure
- Seats: 25
- Political groups: Liberal Democrats: 10 seats Conservative Party: 7 seats Green Party of England and Wales: 3 seats Labour Party: 1 seat Independents: 4 seats
- Salary: None

Elections
- Voting system: First-past-the-post

Meeting place
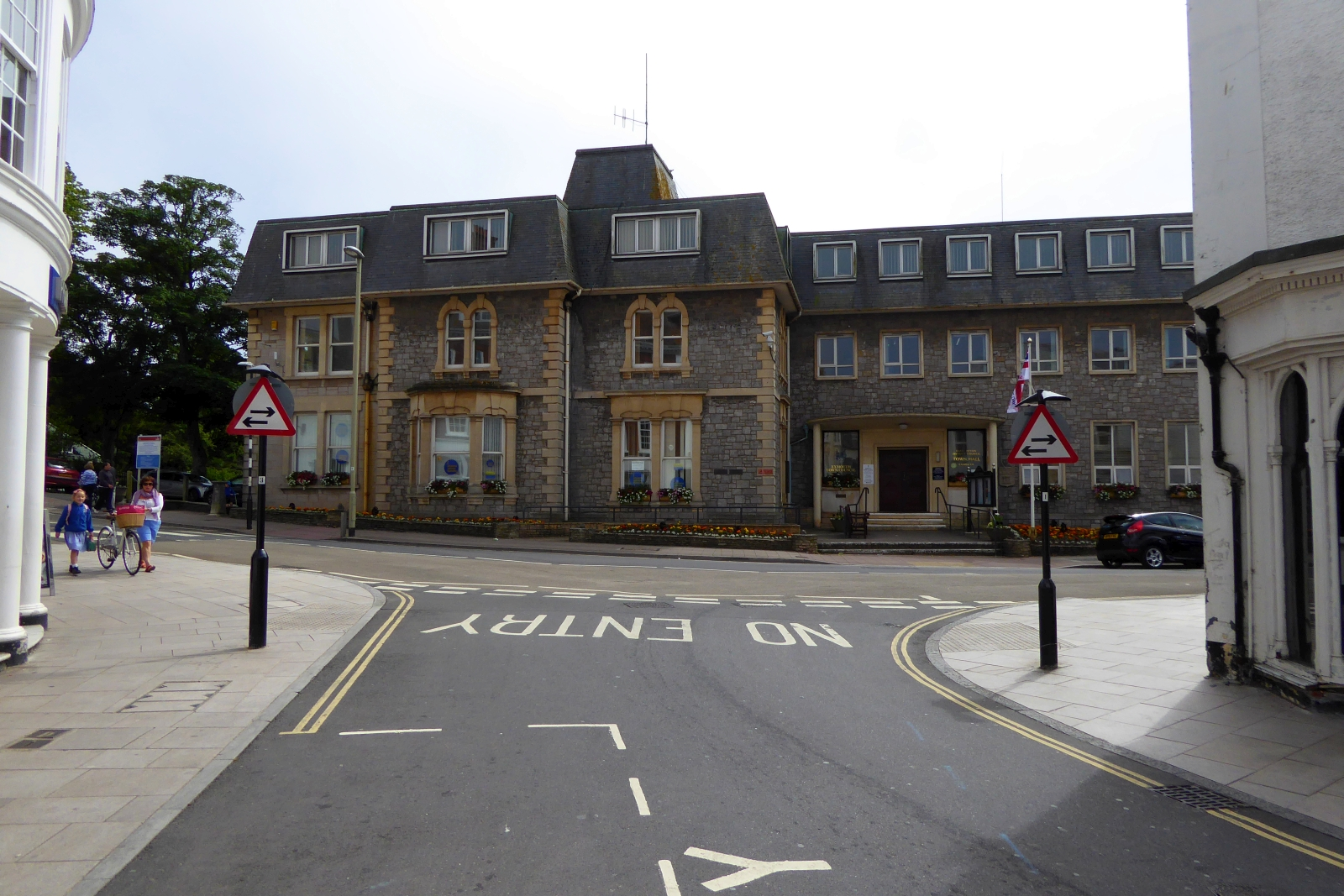
- Exmouth Town Hall, Saint Andrew's Road, Exmouth, EX8 1AW

Website
- https://exmouth.gov.uk/

Administratively Exmouth lies within the East Devon district, along with neighbouring coastal towns east of the Exe. It has its own town council, presided over by a mayor who is elected each year by the councillors. It is based at Exmouth Town Hall. The Council consists of 25 town councillors across the Town's five wards, supported by a team of 13 staff, headed up by the Town Clerk, who is the council's senior paid officer. The Town Council is responsible for the delivery of a wide range of services and assets in the town.

== Landmarks ==
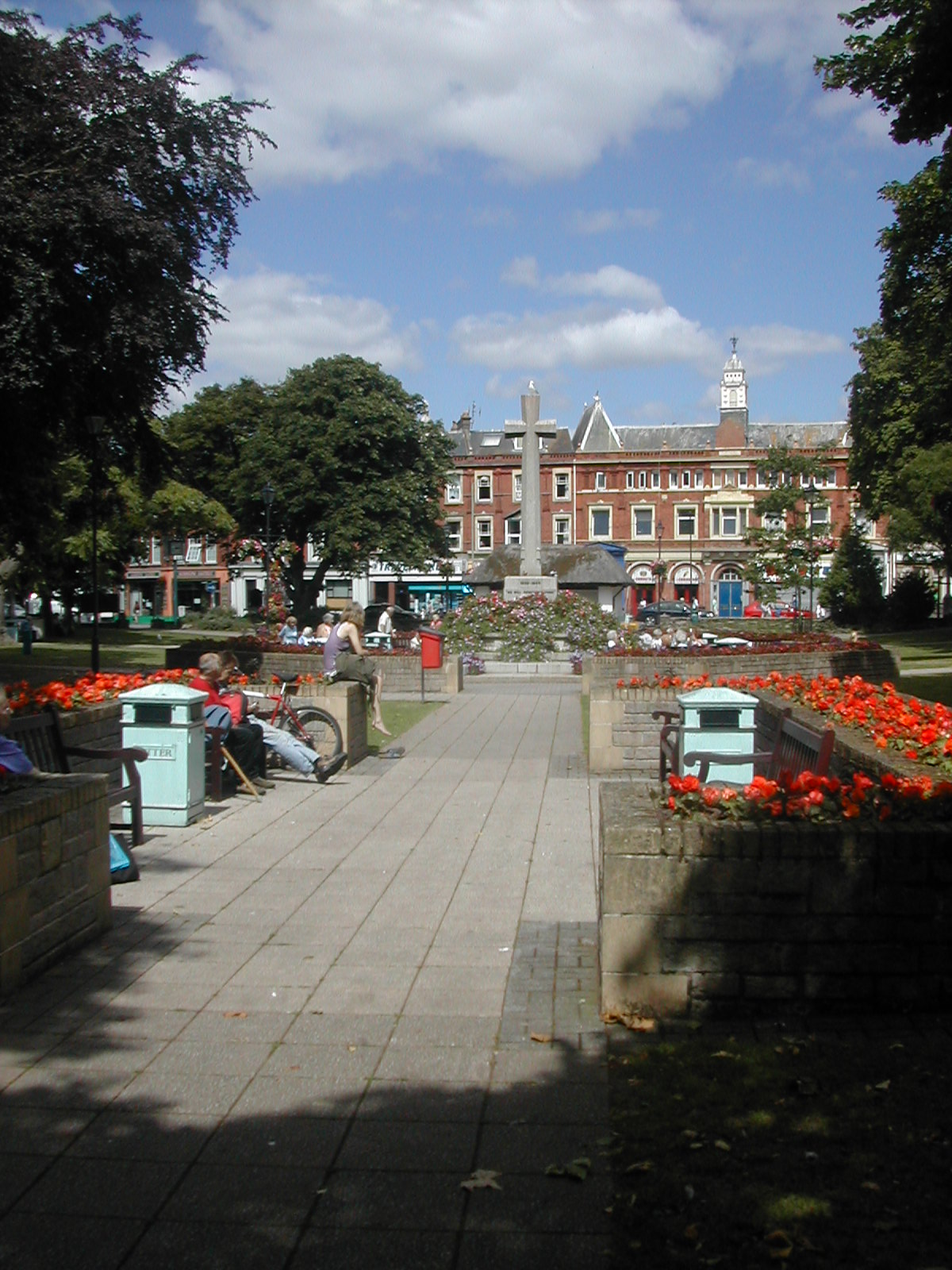
Strand Gardens in the town centre, before redevelopment

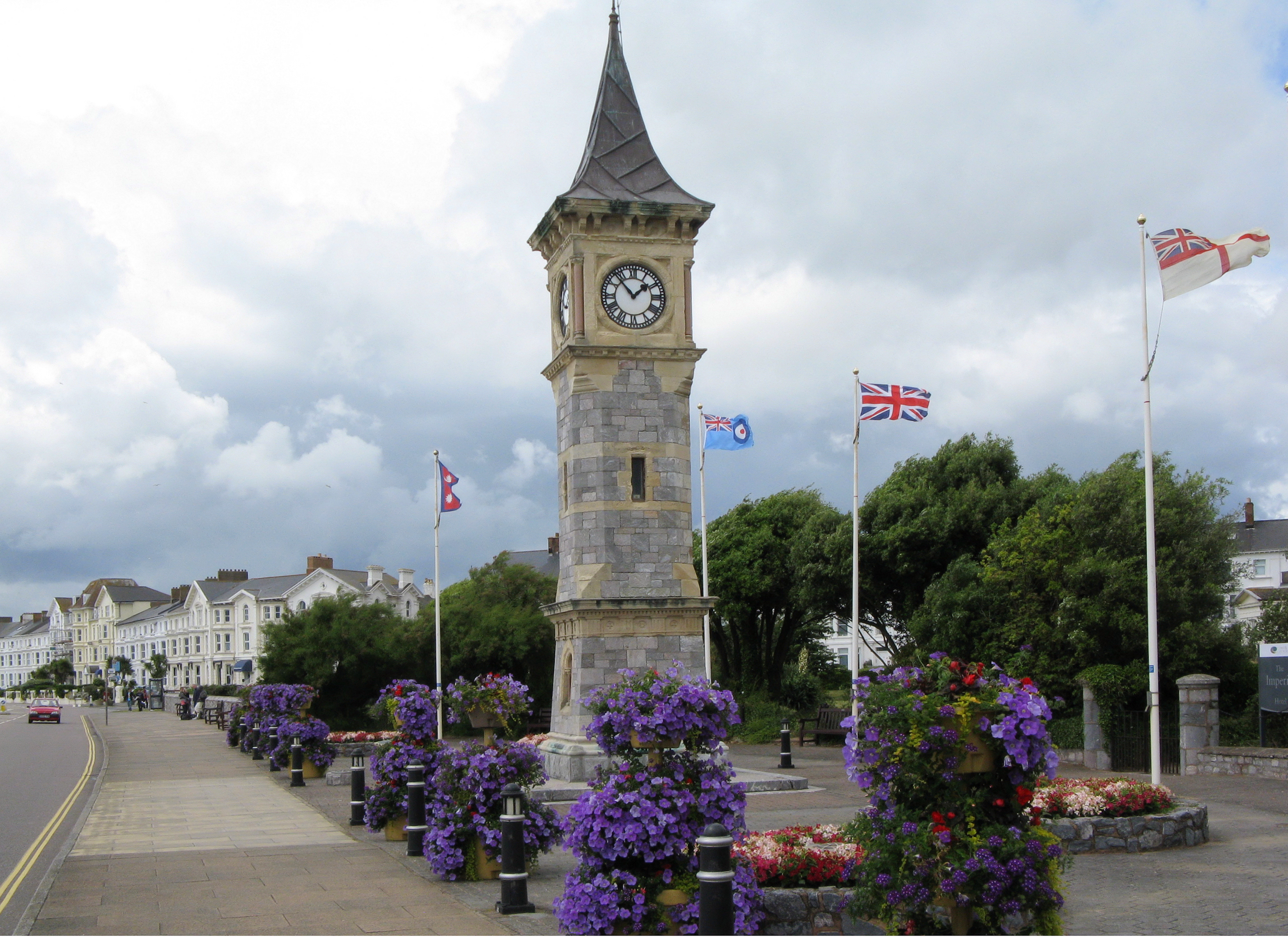
Queen Victoria Diamond Jubilee clock tower on the seafront

The 16-sided 18th century house called A La Ronde, now in the ownership of the National Trust, lies on the northern outskirts of the town. At the eastern end of Exmouth is the Barn, a late 19th century house in Arts and Crafts style.

The National Coastwatch Institution Tower on the seafront has been a familiar feature of the Exmouth beach skyline in family photos and postcards for over 100 years. The red brick building was completed and opened in 1896 as a race observation tower for the then Exmouth Yacht Club, offering enviable views on race days along the beach and toward the estuary mouth. Since then it has changed hands over the course of the 20th century and had many and varied uses including a bathing house, a private home and in 1935 it became a convalescent home as a part of the Princess Elizabeth Orthopaedic Hospital. It was requisitioned in the 40’s and served as a part of the war effort as a defence lookout station watching over our coastline and in peacetime it was reopened as the Harbour View Café (summer 1946) as which it has been trading ever since. Its lookout days did not end during the war however, since 1998 it has been staffed by the National Coastwatch Institute volunteers, keeping an eye on our coast alongside the Coastguard and RNLI. As one of over 50 stations around the UK coast they act as eyes and ears, monitoring the coastline and radio channels on alert for anyone in difficulty and any hazards in the waters.

== Lifeboats ==
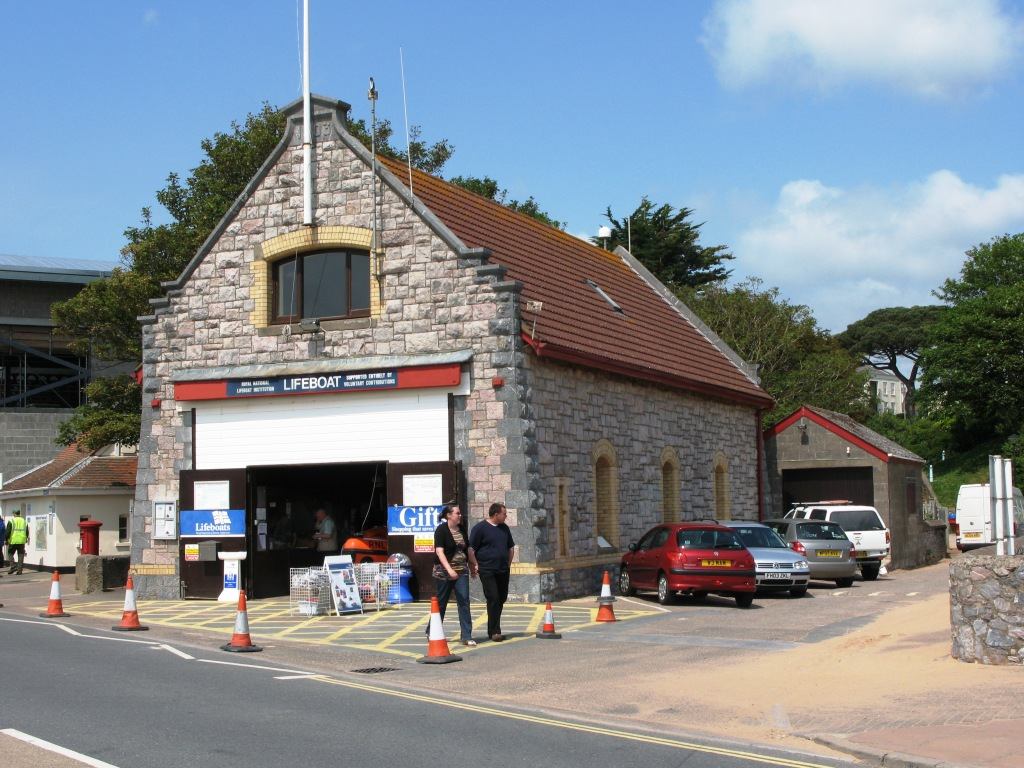
Lifeboat station built in 1903

Exmouth's first lifeboat was provided in 1803. A boathouse was built near Passage House but was washed away in a storm in 1814. The Royal National Lifeboat Institution revived the lifeboat station in 1858. A new boathouse was built near the beach, although the lifeboat had to be taken across the road before it could be launched. This boathouse was demolished and a new one built on the same site in 1903 to accommodate a larger lifeboat. From 1961 the lifeboat was kept afloat in the river near the entrance to Exmouth Docks. A boarding boat was kept on a davit that was lowered into the water to ferry the crew to the lifeboat. The old lifeboat station by the beach was retained as a fund-raising display centre and, from 1966, was the base for an inshore lifeboat. The building used by crews at the docks was demolished in 1996 and replaced by temporary portable buildings.

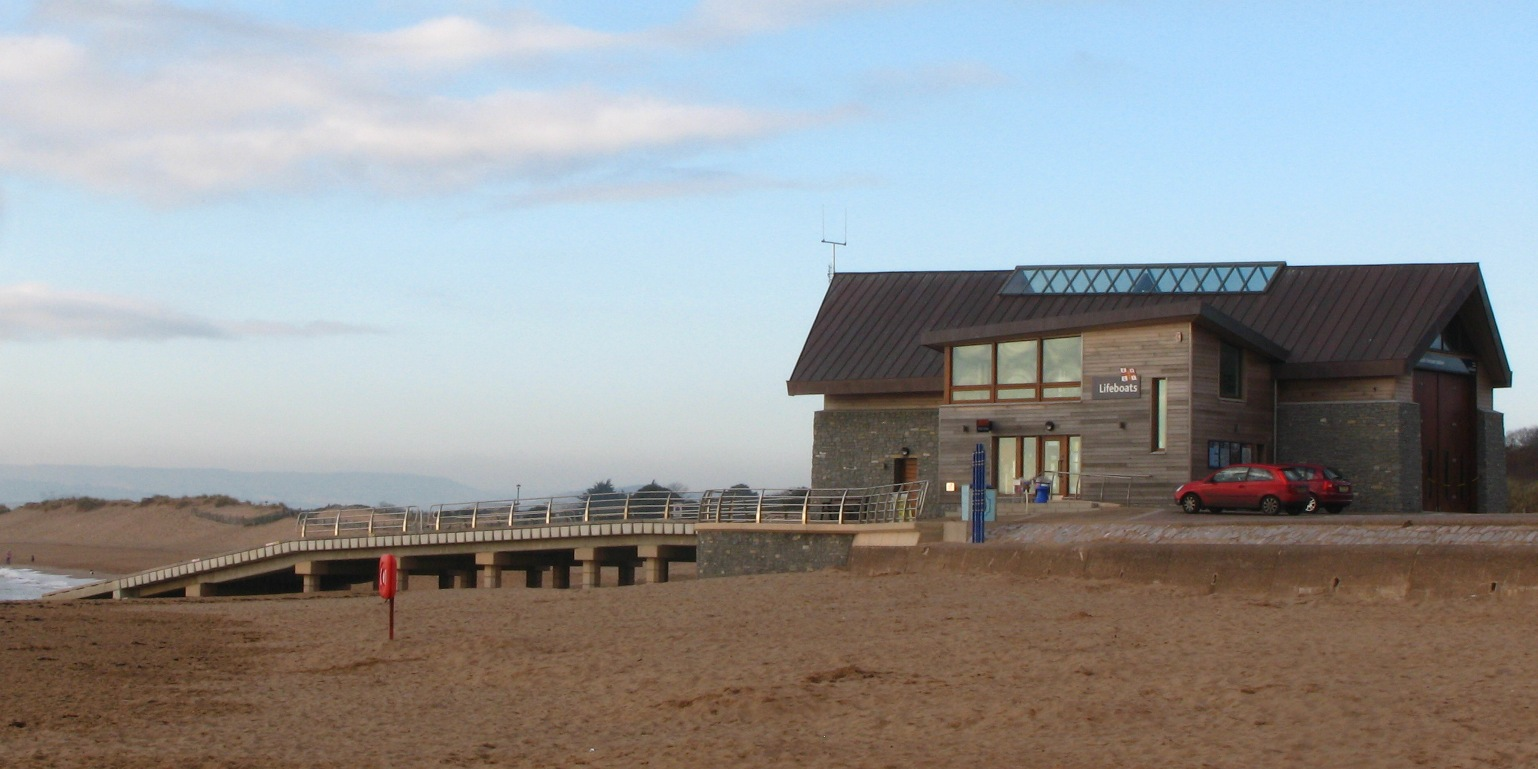
New lifeboat station

On 21 November 2009 both lifeboats were transferred to a new lifeboat station on Queen's Drive at the eastern end of the beach. Within the building is a sign from the now-demolished Volunteer Inn once run by Will Carder. On Christmas Day 1956 he was swept overboard and drowned during a mission on the Maria Noble to save the crew of the Dutch ship MV Minerva 4 miles south east of Orcombe Point. It is regarded as the worst tragedy in the history of Exmouth RNLI.

From this station the Royal National Lifeboat Institution operates a Shannon Class all-weather lifeboat (ALB) R and J Welburn (previously a Mersey-class All Weather Lifeboat (ALB) named Margaret Jean) and D-class (IB1) Inshore Lifeboat (ILB) named George Bearman. The latter was replaced in 2017 by the D-Class Inshore Lifeboat George Bearman II.

The old boathouse was retained as a base for the RNLI lifeguards until 2014, when it became the headquarters of the Exmouth Rowing Club.

== Regeneration ==
As of November 2012, £3 million has been spent on the regeneration of the Strand, which has seen the removal of much of the grass, flower beds and many of the trees. The new features include an additional seating area and bicycle storage; the area has also been completely pedestrianised. The Strand was partially open for Remembrance Sunday 2010 with the war memorial area complete.

== Religion ==
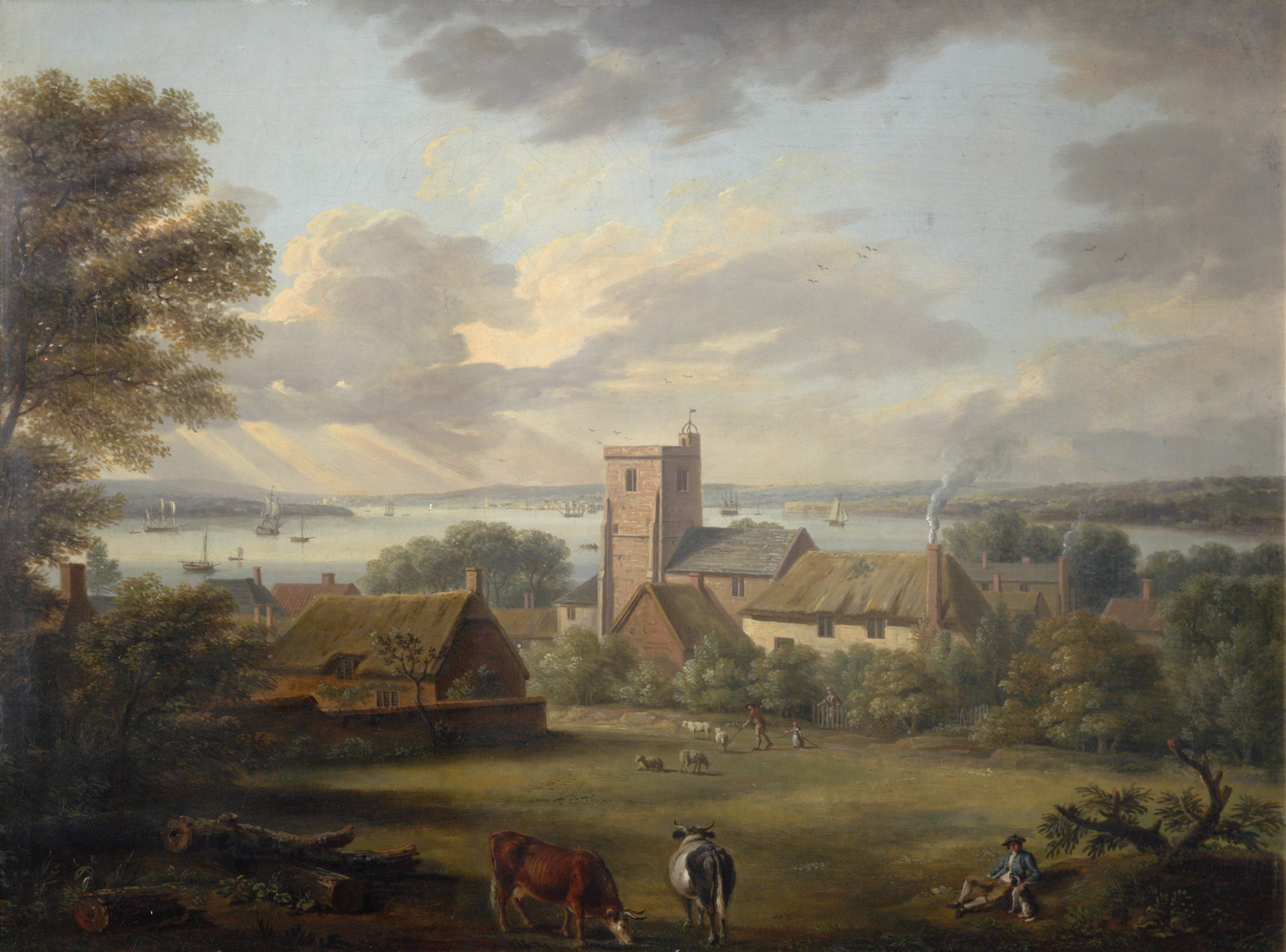
Holy Trinity Church, Exmouth painted by Coplestone Warre Bampfylde in 1771

Exmouth has a number of active churches. About Holy Trinity Church, a parish of the Church of England, an 1850 reference work says this:

The Church [Holy Trinity] is a chapel of ease under the parish church of Littleham, and was erected by the late Lord Rolle, at the cost of £13,000 in 1824-25. It is a handsome structure, in the perpendicular style, standing on the Beacon hill, and having a tower 104 feet high, containing a clock and one bell. The whole length of the building is 140 feet, and its breadth 84. The interior is handsomely fitted up, and has sittings for 1,500 hearers. It has a fine toned organ, and over the altar table is a fine canopy of Beer stone, in the florid Gothic style, ornamented with crockets, pinnacles, & c. The curacy has a small endowment, given by the noble founder and is annexed to the vicarage of Littleham. Until the erection of this church, Exmouth was without an episcopal place of worship; for though a small ancient chapel, dedicated to the Holy Trinity, was standing in 1412, all traces of it disappeared some centuries ago.

Other active churches include Christ Church Exmouth, Hope Church, Glenorchy United Reformed Church, Tower Street Methodist Church, Ichthus Community Church, Holy Ghost Roman Catholic Church, Exmouth Baptist Church, and Exmouth Salvation Army.

== Sport and leisure ==
Exmouth Town F.C. is the leading football team in the town, and play in the Southern League Division 1 South (as of season 2024/25). Exmouth has two rugby union teams, Exmouth RFC and Withycombe RFC. East Devon Eagles rugby league team were based in Exmouth and played until 2011 in the South West Division of the Rugby League Conference. Exmouth is also home to the Polesanders Beach Rugby Club who were established in 2014. Devon County Cricket Club play their Minor Counties Championship matches at the Maer Ground, the homeground of Exmouth Cricket Club (est.1843), whom have achieved multiple championship titles in the Devon Cricket League. Exmouth also has a large indoor leisure centre.

== Media ==
Local TV coverage is provided by BBC South West and ITV West Country. Television signals are received from either the Beacon Hill or Stockland Hill TV transmitters.

Local radio stations are BBC Radio Devon on 104.3 FM, Radio Exe Devon on 107.3, Heart West on 97.0 FM, Greatest Hits Radio South West on 105.5 FM and East Devon Radio, a community based radio station which broadcast to the town on 106.4 FM.

Exmouth's local newspaper, the Exmouth Journal, is published on Thursdays.

== Transport ==
Exmouth railway station is the terminus of the Avocet Line to Exeter St David's station although the trains run through to Paignton through the day. A cycleway has been built alongside the railway as far as Exeter and beyond. The Exmouth to Starcross Ferry is a passenger ferry that operates during the summer months across the Exe estuary to Starcross, where the pumping station for Brunel's Atmospheric Railway can be seen.

There have been three railway stations at Exmouth. The line first reached Exmouth from Exeter in 1861. In the first five days 10,000 people travelled on the line and property prices increased overnight. By the 1880s commuter traffic to Exeter was considerable. In 1903 a link to Budleigh Salterton was opened the line going eastward over a viaduct which went from Exeter Road to Park Road where it entered a cutting continuing onto Littleham Cross where there was also a station (now a private residence), and from there to Budleigh Salterton, there turning north to rejoin the main London and South Western Railway line. Exmouth Station was rebuilt in 1926. When the line to Budleigh was lifted the viaduct was left in place for many years, with its final destruction in the late 1980s. Housing marks its position now.

The route of the line continued behind Phear Park, which was once the grounds of a large house belonging to the Phear family, used during the Second World War to station US soldiers. Shortly after the war the house was burnt down and left derelict; eventually it too was demolished, and its grounds were given to the town by the Phear family to become a park. The old railway line behind Phear Park was just left as a bare trackbed for many years. At its far end there was a deep cutting to Littleham, which was filled in when the line was closed. The trackbed has now been tarmacked and now forms an off-road cycle way and footpath from Exmouth to Knowle, close to Budleigh Salterton.

The latest station was built in 1981 beside the bus station and is a single platform station. It also has a pay and display car park for rail users.

Stagecoach South West operate several, frequent bus services in and around the town, including the 57 Stagecoach Gold service to Brixington in one direction, and Lympstone, Topsham, and Exeter in the other direction. This service runs every 15 minutes. Another popular Stagecoach service is the 95 summer service to Sandy Bay Holiday Park. This is usually operated by an open top bus, and runs every hour.

== Notable people ==
People from Exmouth are known as Exmouthians.

- Alex Wade (born 1986), author
- Antonio Corbisiero (born 1984), footballer
- Brian Sedgemore (1937–2015), politician
- Charles Gifford (1821–1896), Canadian politician
- Collett Leventhorpe (1815–1889), Confederate general
- Conrad Humphreys (born 1973), sailor
- Ed "Stewpot" Stewart (1941–2016), radio DJ and entertainer
- Edgar Humphreys (1914–1944), bomber pilot during the Second World War
- Francis Danby (1793–1861), Irish-born Romantic painter
- Graham Hurley (born 1946), author
- Hugh Davies (1943–2005), composer
- John Churchill, 1st Duke of Marlborough (1650–1722), military leader
- John Nutt (fl. 1620–1623), pirate
- Pam St. Clement (born 1942), actress; attended Rolle College
- Patricia Beer (1919–1999), poet
- Pauline Collins (born 1940), actor
- Pearl Carr (1921–2020), entertainer
- Percy James Grigg (1890–1964), politician
- Pete Lee-Wilson (born 1960), actor
- Peter Knight (1917–1985), composer
- Poppy Fardell (born 1997/1998), singer-songwriter
- R. F. Delderfield (1912–1972), author
- Rebecca Newman (born 1981), singer-songwriter
- Robert Dawson (born 1970), cricketer
- Robin Bush (1943–2010), historian and author
- Spud Rowsell (1943–2021), sailor
- Steve Knightley (born 1954), folk singer-songwriter; member of Show of Hands
- William Francis de Vismes Kane (1840–1918), entomologist
- William Kyd (fl. 1430–1453), pirate and privateer in the English Channel
- Winifred Mayo (1869–1967), actress
- Xia Vigor (born 2009), child actress and model

== Climate ==
Climate data for Exmouth, Salterton Road (1930–1990 averages)
Month	Jan	Feb	Mar	Apr	May	Jun	Jul	Aug	Sep	Oct	Nov	Dec	Year
Mean daily maximum °C (°F)	9 (48)	9 (48)	11 (52)	13 (55)	17 (63)	20 (68)	22 (72)	21 (70)	19 (66)	15 (59)	11 (52)	9 (48)	15 (58)
Mean daily minimum °C (°F)	3 (37)	3 (37)	4 (39)	4 (39)	7 (45)	10 (50)	12 (54)	12 (54)	10 (50)	8 (46)	5 (41)	3 (37)	7 (44)
Average precipitation mm (inches)	89.1 (3.51)	69.9 (2.75)	68.5 (2.70)	55.2 (2.17)	58.0 (2.28)	49.6 (1.95)	48.9 (1.93)	56.1 (2.21)	60.1 (2.37)	92.7 (3.65)	88.5 (3.48)	103.8 (4.09)	840.4 (33.09)
Mean monthly sunshine hours	62.5	79.8	126.2	174.9	210.5	214.5	210.4	198.6	152.7	109.3	75.1	60.0	1,674.5
