= Exmouth Town Hall =

Municipal building in Exmouth, Devon, England

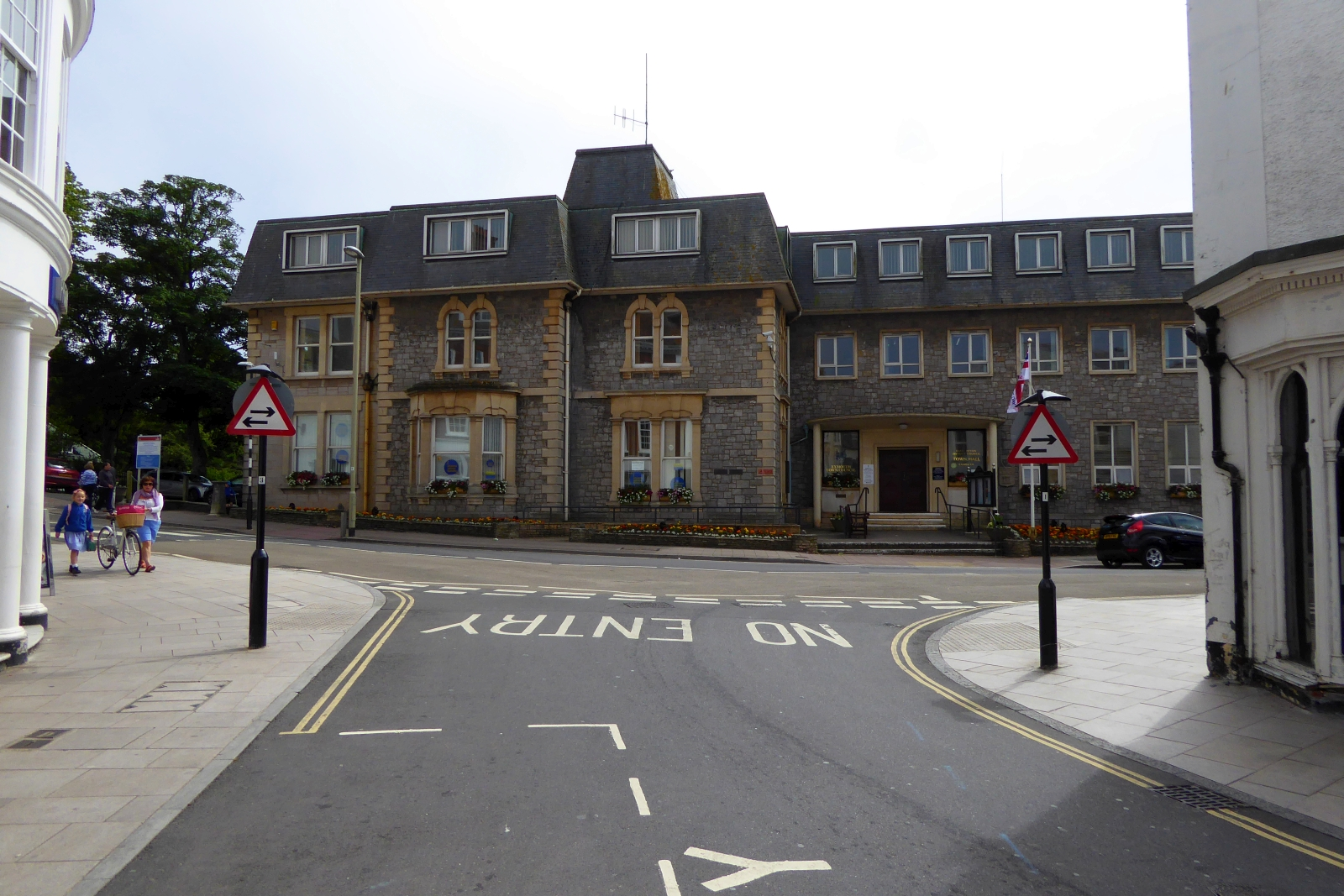
- The building in 2015

- Shown in Devon
- 50.6184°N 3.4146°W
- Location: St Andrews Road, Exmouth

History
- Built: c.1935

Site notes
- Architectural style: Italianate style

Exmouth Town Hall is a municipal building in St Andrews Road in Exmouth, a town in Devon, England. The building currently serves as the meeting place of Exmouth Town Council and also accommodates some staff from East Devon District Council.

== History ==
Following significant population growth, largely associated with its status as a seaside resort, the town appointed a local board in 1850. In the early 1870s, courtyards and tenements were cleared in preparation for the construction of terrace buildings in Rolle Street, and the board later established its offices in a three-storey terrace building there. After the local board was succeeded by an urban district council in 1894, the council looked for more substantial offices. An application was submitted for funding for the new offices in 1925 and it moved to a large Victorian house known as St Bernards in St Andrews Road in around 1930.

In the late 1950s, the council redeveloped the site, replacing the old house with a modern structure, to be known as the Town Hall, which retained elements of the old design, e.g. the bi-partite Italianate windows, and which was completed in around 1960.

The design involved an asymmetrical main frontage of eight bays facing onto St Andrews Road. The left-hand section of two bays was projected forward in relation to the right-hand section of six bays. The first bay, which was further projected forward, featured a prominent bay window with pilasters and keystones and on the ground floor, while the second bay was fenestrated with a bi-partite square-headed window in a similar style, and the first floor had bi-partite round-headed windows in both bays. The right-hand section featured a doorway with an architrave flanked by casement windows and protected by a semi-circular canopy supported by columns. The other bays in the right-hand section were fenestrated by casement windows. At roof level, there was a Châteauesque-style roof with attic windows. The building was later extended with an extra bay to the left. Internally, the principal room was the council chamber.

The building ceased to be the local seat of government when the enlarged East Devon District Council was formed at Sidmouth in 1974. Instead the building became the offices and meeting place of Exmouth Town Council, which rented some space in the building from its owners, East Devon District Council. A plaque commemorating the life of Sub-lieutenant Reginald Warneford, who was awarded the Victoria Cross for air-bombing a Zeppelin during the First World War, was fixed to the wall of the town hall in 1999.

In 2009, local residents proposed that the town hall be added to the National Heritage List for England, but the bid have the building listed was unsuccessful. An extensive programme of refurbishment works, undertaken by Interserve to a design by LHC Design, was completed in October 2017, enabling East Devon District Council to relocate some of its staff from Sidmouth into the town hall.
