= Déyyess =

English singer

- Born: Hannah Jennifer Marie Butcher; Age 26, Born 2000; Chelmsford, England
- Genre: Alternative pop
- Instrument: Vocals
- Years active: 2016–present
- Labels: Boys Boys Boys; Common Knowledge; Kissability

Hannah Jennifer Marie Butcher (born c. 2000), known professionally as Déyyess, is an English singer-songwriter. She (Note: Butcher uses she/her and they/them pronouns.) has released a number of singles and two EPs.

== Early life ==
Butcher grew up in a village near Canterbury, Kent. She played football and was scouted by Arsenal, but declined the offer to pursue music.

== Career ==
At age 16, Butcher released her debut alternative pop single "Guns" in autumn 2016, produced by Neil Comber. The moniker Déyyess is a phonetic spelling of the French word "déesse", which means goddess. She released a second track "Gold", which was named a Record of the Week by Kent's BBC Music Introducing that October. As of 2017, she had early support gigs with the likes of Fyfe and Terra Lightfoot.

After signing with Kissability, Butcher released the single "Escher Heart" in November 2018. This was followed by the singles "Control", "Addicted" and "No Man's Land" in 2019. She featured in The Line of Best Fit Five Day Forecast.

Butcher returned in 2023 with the single "Cherry Pie (i think i love you)" followed by "Bored Again" and "And When the Flowers Bloom" independently in 2024. After a demo of her song "Claire" gained vitality online in June 2024, she signed with the indie label Common Knowledge, through which "Claire" was released as a single in August 2024. She then released "love u (from afar)" in late 2024 and "if i was ur boy" in early 2025, and supported Banks' one-off gig at Koko Camden.

In February 2025, Butcher released her first EP Claire via Common Knowledge. She subsequently signed with the Polydor Records label Boys Boys Boys, through which she released her second EP Would You Go Down on a Girl? in November 2025. Accompanying singles were "She Knows", "Lips Like Sugar" and "Silverlake Baby". In summer and autumn 2025, Butcher performed at BST Hyde Park supporting Olivia Rodrigo, Reading and Leeds Festivals on the BBC Music Introducing stage, and Live at Leeds and supported Alessi Rose on the Voyeur Tour. She embarked on a headline tour in 2026.

== Artistry ==
At age 12, Butcher discovered Lady Gaga, who inspired her to start piano lessons and come to terms with her sexuality. My Bloody Valentine was another formative influence. In January 2019, she named Kate Bush a "huge vocal and melodic influence". In October 2025, Butcher called her music "sparkly grunge", drawing upon The Sundays, Cocteau Twins and The Cranberries. Her songs songs are mostly about sapphic relationships and experiences.

== Discography ==
=== EPs ===
Title	Details
Claire	Released: 14 February 2025; Label: Common Knowledge; Formats: Digital download, streaming
Would You Go Down On A Girl?	Released: 14 November 2025; Label: Boys Boys Boys; Formats: Digital download, streaming
Well I Might Just Die	* Released: 2026

=== Singles ===
Year	Song	Album
2016	"Guns"	Non-album single
2016	"Gold"	Non-album single
2018	"Escher Heart"	Non-album single
2019	"Control"	Non-album single
2019	"Addicted"	Non-album single
2019	"No Man's Land"	Non-album single
2023	"cherry pie (i think i love you)"	Non-album single
2024	"Bored Again"	Non-album single
2024	"And When the Flowers Bloom"	Non-album single
2024	"Claire"	Claire
2024	"love u (from afar)"	Claire
2025	"if i was ur boy"	Claire
2025	"She Knows"	Would You Go Down on a Girl?
2025	"Lips Like Sugar"	Would You Go Down on a Girl?
2026	"Silverlake Baby"	Would You Go Down on a Girl?

=== Music videos ===
Year	Title	Director
2019	"Escher Heart"	
2019	"Control"	
2023	"cherry pie (i think i love you)"	Herself
2024	"Bored Again"	Herself
2024	"And When the Flowers Bloom"	Herself
2025	"She Knows"	Nicole Ngai
2025	"Lips Like Sugar"	Sal Redpath
2025	"Interlude"	Katya Ganfield
2025	"Lights Off"	Nicole Ngai
2025	"Would You Go Down on a Girl?"	Katya Ganfield
2026	"Silverlake Baby"	Samantha Monendo
2026	"Me, Oh My"	Samantha Monendo
