= First Time Flyers =

British country music band

First Time Flyers are a British country music band consisting of Tim Prottey-Jones, Vicki Manser, Jake Morrell, and Poppy Fardell.

In 2023, they played at BST Hyde Park, performing as an opening support act for Bruce Springsteen and the E Street Band.

Their song "Bound to Break" reached number 81 on the UK singles chart in 2025.

In 2025 they toured throughout the UK, including Bristol, Leeds, Edinburgh, Milton Keynes, Exmouth, Leicestershire's Stanford Hall, Nottingham, and others.

In 2026, the band began touring throughout the UK and Europe, including Germany and the Netherlands.
