= Propellers (band) =

English rock and synth-pop band

- Origin: Royal Tunbridge Wells, Kent, England
- Genres: Indie rock, indie pop, synth-pop
- Past members: Max Davenport; Archie Davenport; Charlie Simpson; Jimmy Goodwin; Will Wilkinson
- Website: propellersofficial.com

Propellers were an indie rock / synth-pop band from Royal Tunbridge Wells, Kent, England. The band members are Max Davenport (lead vocals), Archie Davenport (guitar), Charlie Simpson (bass guitar), Jimmy Goodwin (keyboards) and Will Wilkinson (drums). The band has not been active since 2016, with members transitioning to a new project under the moniker of The Modern Strangers.

The band has been signed to Red Light Management, a global management company that represents artist such as Alicia Keys, Franz Ferdinand and Kaiser Chiefs, among others.

== Career ==
Propellers released their debut EP Midnight Kiss on 28 January 2013. The same day, the title track from the record was released as a single, together with an accompanying music video. "Midnight Kiss" was first played by Jacob Rickard on BBC Introducing in Kent at the start of January. The band were chosen for daytime plays on BBC Radio 1 shows, including Sara Cox and Scott Mills. In March 2013, the band released the second single from the EP, titled "Landslide". A video for the track was also released onto YouTube.

Propellers' second EP, Black Mascara Eyes, was released on 15 July 2013. A music video for the title single was released onto YouTube on 1 July.

In 2013, the band played many high profiled festivals, including T in the Park 2013 on the BBC Introducing Stage & BST Summer Time at Hyde Park with The Rolling Stones.

2014 saw the band take a break and return to the studio to write new songs. 'City Boys & Model Girls' was uploaded to stream for free via SoundCloud & Spotify in September 2014.

In 2015, Propellers released new song 'Come Alive' with huge video shot in London, starring model Eve Delf. 'Come Alive’ (featuring Stasis) became BBC Introducing's record of the week. Just a month later, the band released another new, heavier song called 'Deep Into The Night'.

Propellers are set to headline Camden Barfly on 15 December.

After some time, most of the group members, with the bassist replaced by Patrick Murphy, entered a new band known as The Modern Strangers.

== Band members ==
- Max Davenport – lead vocals
- Archie Davenport – guitar
- Charlie Simpson – bass guitar
- Jimmy Goodwin – keyboards
- Will Wilkinson – drums

== Discography ==
=== Extended plays ===
Title	Album details
Midnight Kiss	Released: 28 January 2013; Label: Propellers Music; Formats: Digital download
Black Mascara Eyes	Released: 15 July 2013; Label: Propellers Music; Formats: Digital download
City Boys & Model Girls	Released: 10 September 2014; Label: Propellers Music; Formats: Free Streaming

=== Singles ===
Title	Year	Album
"Midnight Kiss"	2013	Midnight Kiss
"Landslide"	2013	Midnight Kiss
"Black Mascara Eyes"	2013	Black Mascara Eyes
"City Boys & Model Girls"	2014	City Boys & Model Girls

== Music videos ==
Year	Song	Album	Director(s)	Source
2013	"Midnight Kiss"	Midnight Kiss EP	LOVE Vis-Art, Mike Lee Thomas	
2013	"Landslide"	Midnight Kiss EP	Tom Bryan	
2013	"Black Mascara Eyes"	Black Mascara Eyes EP	Duncan Howsley	
