= Evan Bartels =

American singer-songwriter

- Birth name: Evan George Bartels
- Origin: Tobias, Nebraska, United States
- Genres: Americana, Rock and Roll, country
- Occupation(s): Singer-songwriter, musician
- Years active: 2010—present
- Labels: Sower Records MCA
- Website: https://www.evanbartels.com

Evan George Bartels is an American singer-songwriter, musician, and writer from Nashville, Tennessee.

== Biography ==
Bartels grew up in Tobias, Nebraska as the second youngest of four kids. At the age of 5 years old he developed an interest in music and began learning piano during his early elementary school years. Around the age of 12 years old, Bartels received his first acoustic guitar and began teaching himself how to play. Through his teenage years he gained experience songwriting by playing in bands.

In 2017, Bartels spent a considerable amount of time on the road, performing 110 dates on his Great Americana Tour. Amidst his 2017 touring, while in Red Hook, Brooklyn, Bartels performed on NPR Music’s Night Owl music series via Facebook live.

Evan Bartels released his debut album, ‘The Devil, God & Me’, on Sower Records, on September 23, 2017. The album spent one week at No. 5 on the Billboard Heatseekers – West North Central chart.

== Discography ==
Title	Release type	Release details
The Devil, God & Me	LP	Release Date: September 23, 2017; Label: Sower Records; Format: CD, Digital
Promised Land	EP	Release Date: April 26, 2019; Label: Evan Bartels (self-released); Format: CD, Digital
Lonesome	LP	Release Date: September 17, 2021; Label: Intelligent Noise; Format: CD, Digital
The Bones: Volume 1	EP	Release Date: April 29, 2022; Label: Evan Bartels (self-released); Format: Digital
To Make You Cry	EP	Release Date: May 23, 2025; Label: MCA; Format: Digital

== Awards & recognition ==
Award title	Year
Omaha Entertainment and Arts Awards (OEAAs): Album of the Year "Promised Land"	2020
Songwriter's Hall of Fame Abe Olman Scholarship Recipient (ASCAP)	2024
