= The Vegetable Orchestra =

Austrian musical ensemble playing instruments made from vegetables

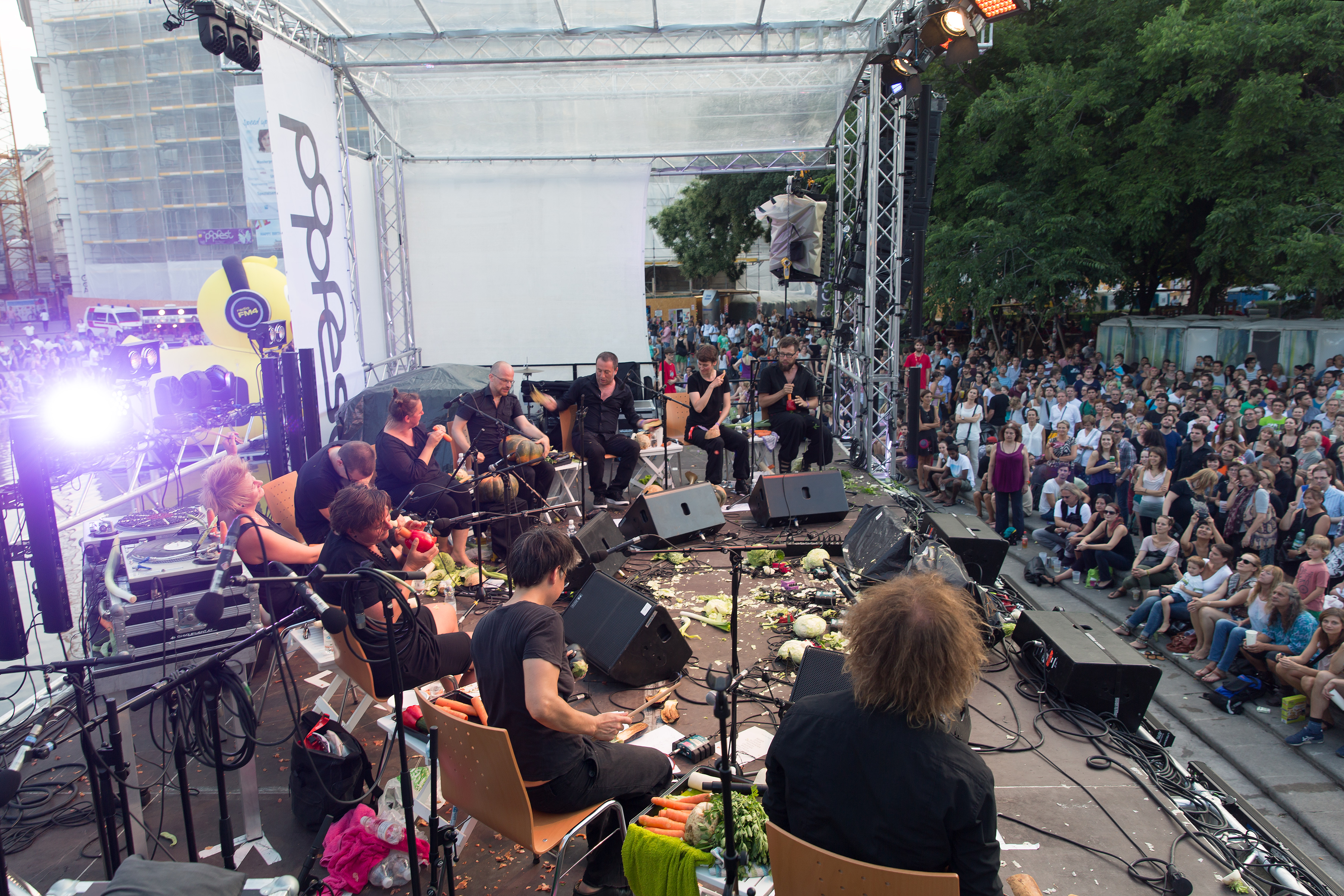
The Vegetable Orchestra, July 2015

The logo of Das erste Wiener Gemüseorchester, featuring a vegetable trumpet used by the group

The Vegetable Orchestra (also known as Das erste Wiener Gemüseorchester, The First Vienna Vegetable Orchestra or The Vienna Vegetable Orchestra) is an Austrian musical group who use instruments made entirely from fresh vegetables.

== History ==
The group was founded in February 1998 in Vienna and consists of ten musicians, a cook, and a sound technician. All of the members of the ensemble are active in various artistic areas (for example trained musicians, sound poets, sculptors, media artists, designers, and architects) and have worked together conceptualizing and carrying out their project.

The interdisciplinary approach is a crucial factor in researching and further developing vegetable music. The intention is to create a sonorous experience which can be perceived with all senses.

Musical concepts of the Fluxus movement, for example compositions from John Cage could be considered as a source of inspiration for the unique orchestra. Their distinctive repertoire also seems to have deep roots in sound art in addition to experimental and electronic music because they play unheard-of interpretations of Igor Stravinsky, the German electronic band Kraftwerk, or the Austrian band Radian as well as their own compositions. All of the pieces feature various forms of graphical notation and are exclusively composed for live performance.

=== Members ===
The ensemble consists of Jürgen Berlakovich, Verena Fuchs, Susanna Gartmayer, Barbara Kaiser, Matthias Meinharter, Jörg Piringer, Ingrid Schlögl, Ulrich Troyer, Stefan Voglsinger, and Martina Winkler.

== Instruments ==
The instruments are made of carrots, celery, peppers, squash, zucchini and other raw vegetables prior to the performances. Their sound is amplified with the use of special microphones. The leftover vegetables and off-cuts are cooked into soup that is served to the audience after the performance.

As of March 2019, since the band's inception, more than 150 vegetable instruments had been designed, including carrot xylophones, radish bass flutes, pumpkin drums, leek violins, onion maracas, and many others.

== Influence ==
The group performs an average of 20-30 shows a year and have toured Europe, the United States, and Asia, playing gallery openings, exhibitions, community events, and headlining their own shows.

They received a Guinness World Record for "Most concerts by a vegetable orchestra", for 344 performances by a group of musicians playing with instruments constructed out of vegetables, having performed in venues worldwide from April 1998 to September 2024. According to the BBC, they inspired the formation of similar ensembles like the London Vegetable Orchestra and the Long Island Vegetable Orchestra.

== Discography ==
=== Albums ===
- Gemise (1999)
- Automate (2003)
- Remixed (2008)
- Onionoise (2010)
- Green Album (2018)
- Season V (2026)

Gemise means Gemüse in Bohemian dialect. In Vienna at the time of the Austria-Hungary monarchy, a cooking homehelp or housekeeper often came from Bohemia and contributed to Viennese cuisine until today. Automate is certainly a play on words with tomate (= tomato). The core of the portmanteau word of onionoise, ...ionoi... is a palindrome.

The second part of Gemise is named Ogludschda, which is Viennese dialect for Abgelutschter, or English sucked off, in the second meaning–in German–for a music piece which has been played too often.

=== EPs ===
- Remix Trilogy (Volume One) (2004)
- Remix Trilogy (Volume Two) (2005)
- Remix Trilogy (Volume Three) (2005)
- Remix Conclusion (2008)
