= Broken Hands =

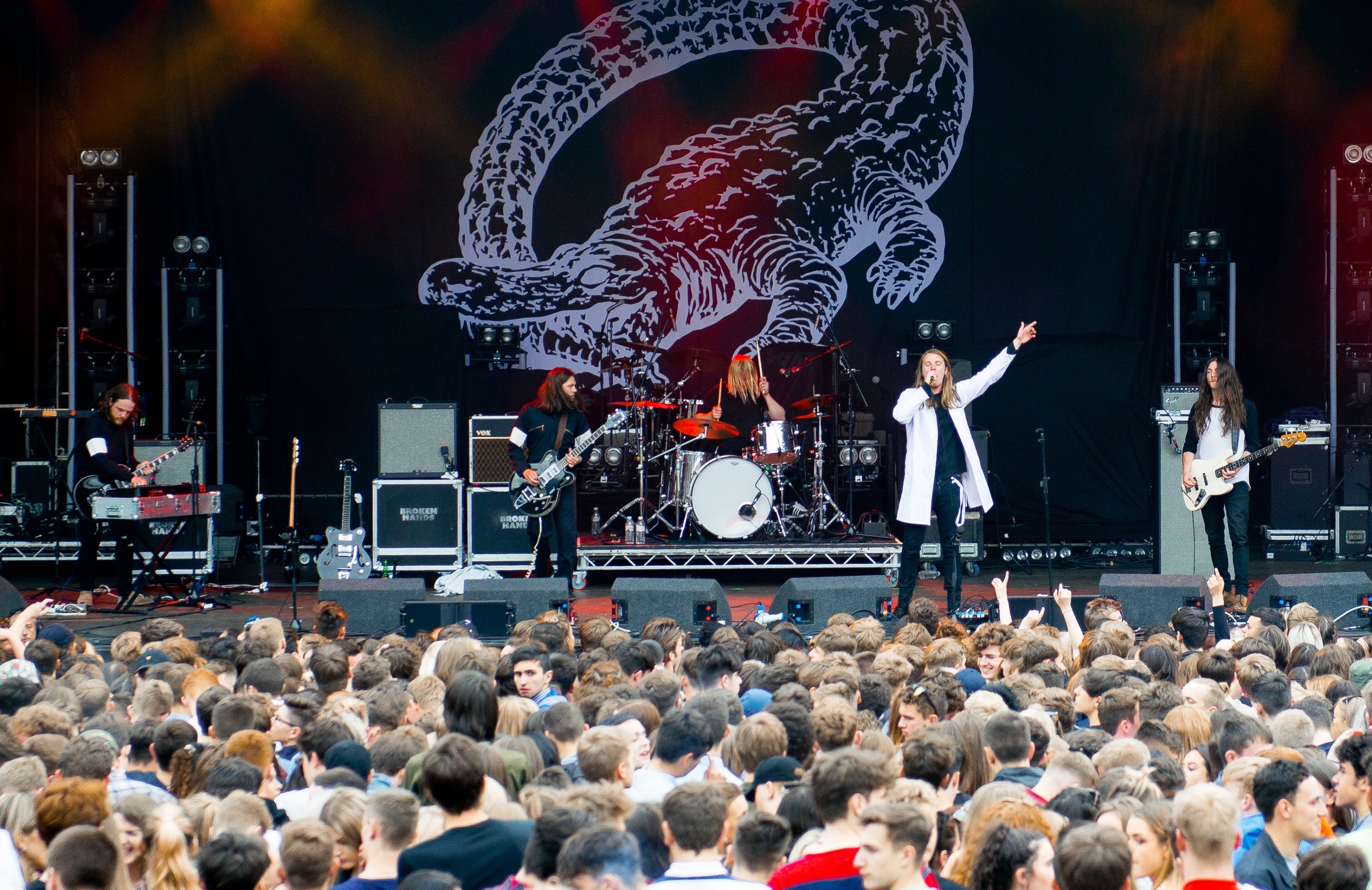

Background information
- Origin: Faversham, Kent, England
- Genres: Rock
- Years active: 2006–present
- Labels: Atlantic Records; SO Recordings; AED; Music For Heroes; 1965
- Members: Dale Norton; Callum Norton; Jamie Darby; Thomas Ford; David Hardstone
- Website: www.brokenhandsband.com

Broken Hands are an English rock band, formed in 2006 in Faversham, Kent, England. The band is composed of vocalist Dale Norton, guitarist Jamie Darby, bassist Thomas Ford, drummer Callum Norton and guitarist/keyboardist David Hardstone. They are reportedly named after the character Chief Broken Hand from the Western film White Feather.

The band originally formed under the name of Onlookers at the age of 15. They released their debut single Mine in September 2007 via 1965 Records, and follow up single Canterbury Tales in October 2009. They toured in support of One Night Only and General Fiasco and picked up radio interest from XFM (John Kennedy’s ‘Hot One’), BBC 6, NME Radio, Radio 1 and Radio 2. They began putting on clubnights in Canterbury called Hoochie Coochie.

Changing their name to Broken Hands, they were the first signing to James Endeacott and Edwyn Collins' new label AED (Endeacott was also behind 1965 Records who released their debut single). The first released under the new name came via 7" single Brother in October 2011. They then began working with producer Tom Dalgety and released the single If You Need To Lie in May 2012 and EP Down By The Current in May 2013 via Music For Heroes. They also self-released The Quadrangle Session EP. Originally a 4-piece, guitarist/keyboardist David Hardstone joined the band in 2014.

The band released their debut album Turbulence in October 2015 via SO Recordings. The album was produced by Tom Dalgety at Rockfield Studios. Whilst touring the album, the band covered the rooms they were playing with silver tinfoil to make the audience feel that they were inside a space capsule, in a concept which they named "Silver Landing Program". Singer Dale Norton revealed that the band had not been happy with the material they had been writing for their debut album and had scapped everything. They were on the verge of splitting up until he was inspired by air and space travel after having dropped off a friend at an airport. The band moved into a communal space in Littlebourne and began writing.

In October 2018 it was announced that the band had signed to Atlantic Records and shared two new songs "Split In Two" and "Friends House".

== Discography ==
=== Albums ===
- Turbulence (SO recordings - 9 October 2015)
- Split In Two (SO recordings - 21 August 2020)

=== Singles and EPs ===
- "Mine" (1965 Records - September 2007)
- "Canterbury Tales" (Sell Yourself - October 2009)
- "Brother" (AED - October 2011)
- "If You Need To Lie" (Music For Heroes - May 2012)
- "Down By The Current" (Music For Heroes - October 2013)
- "Split In Two" / "Friends House" (Atlantic Records - October 2018)
