= DellaXOZ =

English musician (born 2004)

- Born: Daniella Landy Lubasu; 11 August 2004 (age 22); Bolton, England
- Genres: Alt pop; indie rock; Britpop revival
- Occupation: Musician
- Years active: 2020–present
- Member of: Loud LDN

Daniella Landy Lubasu (born 11 August 2004), known professionally as DellaXOZ (/ɛksoʊziː/), is an English singer. Born in Bolton, she began experimenting with Soundtrap at 12 years old as an outlet for her emotions, before diversifying into GarageBand. She has released two EPs: The Della Variant (2022) and Dellairium (2024). She is a member of Loud LDN.

== Life and career ==
Daniella Landy Lubasu was born in Bolton, a suburb of Greater Manchester where indie rock was popular. Her parents were Congolese, and would play Congolese music in the car, as well as listening to radio stations; when she was in primary school her father would play the hits of Rihanna and Beyoncé, while her mother would play older music such as seventies rock and ABBA. Her first musical experiences were listening to the radio and the UK Top 40 on TV; aged ten, she became obsessed with boybands such as One Direction.

She began writing as a teenager as an outlet for her emotions, and began experimenting with free software aged twelve, making use of Soundtrap and GarageBand; she tweeted in June 2022 to state that she had made music on Soundtrap first and started on GarageBand when she was about fifteen. She created an Instagram account in mid-2018 with the username DellaXOZ, as she wished to publish her musical output without her classmates finding out, followed by a dedicated TikTok account in late 2019, to which she uploaded cover versions; in August 2022, The Line of Best Fit described her account as "a stream of graphic eyeliner, fingerless gloves, and excessive layers of thin chain necklaces". Her first release was her own track, "Scary", released later that year.

During the COVID-19 pandemic in the United Kingdom, Lubasu suffered from writer's block, which subsided after Addison Rae commented on one of her videos; the first track she created after was "I Want, Doesn't Get", which took its title from her mother's response to requests. In June 2021, Lubasu released "Ahh!!", which lasted around a minute and a half. The track went viral on TikTok, prompting a lawyer to get in touch and recommend that she get management. "I Want, Doesn't Get" was released in June 2022. She then released a single the following month about ignoring those she was in conflict with, "Paranoia", and announced an EP, The Della Variant, which was released on 11 August 2022, her eighteenth birthday, alongside a video for focus track "We Move".

Lubasu then signed with Communion Music, and in October 2023, Lubasu released "Boring", a track about celebrating break-ups, followed by "Come Again" in January 2024, a track about adolescence. She then announced an EP, Dellairium, and the following month she released "Don't Do It", a partially spoken warning not to resume a harmful relationship out of familiarity. Dellairium was released in March 2024, and ended with "It's All Good, Kid", which became BBC Radio 1's Hottest Record in the World. A further track, "Unhinged", was released in January 2025 after a demo version went viral and was written about the deficiencies of dating.

== Artistry ==
In an interview with Whynow.co.uk, Lubasu stated that she was inspired by watching big artists such as Beyoncé on TV as well as from the energy of Nicki Minaj and the songwriting of Taylor Swift and Lorde. She also felt she was shaped by her background in Manchester with the energy of its Britpop scene. Laura Molloy in The Line of Best Fit described the track "Paranoia" in particular as sonically combining Manchester-style indie sounds with Soukous, while DIY described "Come Again" as a Britpop revival track. Robin Murray of Clash described Lubasu as an alt-pop musician in October 2023, Mark Kelly of Brighton & Hove News described her works as R&B in March 2024, and Amber Lashley of DIY described her works as indie pop in January 2025; however, in an April 2024 interview with Dork, she stated that she was not interested in sticking to a single genre and that she made music which had "a feeling of what sounds good". Lubasu became a member of Loud LDN, a collective of London-based women and non-binary artists set up in May 2022, that year.
